= Boxing at the 2008 Summer Olympics – Qualification =

The following is the qualification summary for boxing competitions at the 2008 Summer Olympics.

== Qualification summary ==
NOC	Men											Total
NOC	-48kg	-51kg	-54kg	-57kg	-60kg	-64kg	-69kg	-75kg	-81kg	-91kg	+91kg	Total
Algeria			X	X	X			X	X	X	X	7
Argentina								X				1
Armenia	X				X	X		X				4
Australia		X	X	X	X	X	X	X		X	X	9
Azerbaijan		X		X								2
Bahamas							X					1
Belarus			X				X		X	X		4
Botswana			X	X								2
Brazil	X	X		X	X	X			X			6
Bulgaria						X					X	2
Cameroon	X					X	X					3
Canada							X					1
Central African Republic							X					1
China	X		X	X	X	X	X	X	X	X	X	10
Colombia			X		X				X	X	X	5
Croatia									X		X	2
Cuba	X	X	X	X	X	X	X	X		X	X	10
Dominican Republic	X	X		X		X	X	X				6
Democratic Republic of the Congo								X				1
Ecuador	X			X				X				3
Egypt							X	X	X			3
France	X	X	X	X	X	X	X	X		X		9
The Gambia								X				1
Georgia				X			X					2
Germany			X	X			X	X				4
Ghana	X		X	X		X		X	X			6
Great Britain		X	X			X	X	X	X		X	7
Greece								X		X		2
Grenada							X					1
Guatemala		X										1
Haiti									X			1
Hungary	X	X			X	X			X			5
India		X	X	X				X	X			5
Iran						X			X	X		3
Ireland	X		X			X		X	X			5
Italy		X	X	X	X					X	X	6
Japan				X		X						2
Kazakhstan	X	X	X	X	X	X	X	X	X		X	10
Kenya	X	X		X					X			4
Kyrgyzstan					X							1
Lesotho			X									1
Lithuania						X			X		X	3
Madagascar					X							1
Mauritius			X			X						2
Mexico			X	X	X							3
Moldova			X				X					2
Mongolia	X		X	X		X						4
Montenegro										X		1
Morocco	X	X	X	X	X	X	X	X		X	X	10
Namibia	X				X		X					3
Nigeria					X				X	X	X	4
North Korea					X							1
Papua New Guinea	X											1
Philippines	X											1
Poland	X	X										2
Puerto Rico		X	X		X	X			X			5
Romania					X	X						2
Russia	X	X	X	X	X	X	X	X	X	X	X	11
Samoa									X			1
Sierra Leone	X											1
South Africa		X										1
South Korea		X	X		X		X	X				5
Spain	X											1
Sri Lanka		X										1
Sweden								X	X			2
Tajikistan	X	X							X			3
Thailand	X	X	X	X	X	X	X	X				8
Tunisia		X		X	X	X			X			5
Turkey		X		X	X		X		X			5
Turkmenistan							X					1
Uganda	X											1
Ukraine	X			X	X		X	X		X	X	7
United States	X	X		X	X	X	X	X		X		8
Uzbekistan	X	X	X	X			X	X	X			7
Venezuela	X		X			X		X	X		X	6
Virgin Islands							X		X			2
Zambia		X				X	X					3
Total: 77 NOCs	29	27	27	28	27	28	29	28	28	16	16	283

== Qualification timeline ==
Event		Date	Venue
World Championships		Oct 23 – Nov 3, 2007	(United States) Chicago
African Qualifiers	1st Qualifier	January 23–31, 2008	(Algeria) Algiers
African Qualifiers	2nd Qualifier	March 24–29, 2008	(Namibia) Windhoek
Asian Qualifiers	1st Qualifier	Jan 25 – Feb 2, 2008	(Thailand) Bangkok
Asian Qualifiers	2nd Qualifier	March 17–23, 2008	(Kazakhstan) Astana
American Qualifiers	1st Qualifier	March 12–18, 2008	(Trinidad and Tobago) Port of Spain
American Qualifiers	2nd Qualifier	April 25–30, 2008	Guatemala City
European Qualifiers	1st Qualifier	Feb 25 – Mar 1, 2008	(Italy) Roseto degli Abruzzi
European Qualifiers	2nd Qualifier	April 7–12, 2008	(Greece) Athens
Oceania Championships		April 21–25, 2008	(Samoa) Apia

== Light Flyweight (-48kg) ==
Event		Vacancies	Qualified
Africa	World Championships	0	
Africa	1st Qualifier	3	(Namibia) Jafet Uutoni (Kenya) Suleiman Bilali (Ghana) Manyo Plange
Africa	2nd Qualifier	3	(Cameroon) Thomas Essomba (Morocco) Redouane Bouchtouk (Uganda) Ronald Serugo
Asia	World Championships	3	(China) Zou Shiming (Philippines) Harry Tanamor (Thailand) Amnat Ruanroeng
Asia	1st Qualifier	2	(Kazakhstan) Birzhan Zhakypov (Uzbekistan) Rafikjon Sultonov
Asia	2nd Qualifier	2	(Tajikistan) Sherali Dostiev (Mongolia) Pürevdorjiin Serdamba
America	World Championships	1	(United States) Luis Yanez
America	1st Qualifier	2	(Ecuador) José Luis Meza (Venezuela) Eduard Bermúdez
America	2nd Qualifier	3	(Brazil) Paulo Carvalho (Dominican Republic) Winston Mendez (Cuba) Yampier Hernández
Europe	World Championships	4	(France) Nordine Oubaali (Armenia) Hovhannes Danielyan (Ukraine) Georgiy Chygayev (Republic of Ireland) Patrick Barnes
Europe	1st Qualifier	2	(Russia) David Ayrapetyan (Poland) Lukasz Maszczyk
Europe	2nd Qualifier	2	(Hungary) Pál Bedák (Spain) Kelvin de la Nieve
Oceania	World Championships	0	
Oceania	Oceania Championships	1	(Papua New Guinea) Jack Willie
Tripartite Commission Invitation		1	(Sierra Leone) Saidu Kargbo
TOTAL		29	

== Flyweight (-51kg) ==
Event		Vacancies	Qualified
Africa	World Championships	0	
Africa	1st Qualifier	3	(Tunisia) Walid Cherif (Morocco) Abdelillah Nhaila; ~~(Ethiopia) Molla Getachew~~
Africa	2nd Qualifier	3	(Zambia) Cassius Chiyanika (Kenya) Bernard Ngumba (South Africa) Jackson Chauke
Asia	World Championships	2	(Thailand) Somjit Jongjohor (Sri Lanka) Anurudha Rathnayake
Asia	1st Qualifier	2	(Tajikistan) Anvar Yunusov (South Korea) Lee Ok-Sung
Asia	2nd Qualifier	3	(Kazakhstan) Mirat Sarsembayev (Uzbekistan) Tulashboy Doniyorov (India) Jitender Kumar
America	World Championships	2	(United States) Raushee Warren (Puerto Rico) McWilliams Arroyo
America	1st Qualifier	2	(Dominican Republic) Juan Carlos Payano (Cuba) Andry Laffita
America	2nd Qualifier	2	(Guatemala) Eddie Valenzuela (Brazil) Robenilson Vieria
Europe	World Championships	4	(Italy) Vincenzo Picardi (Azerbaijan) Samir Mammadov (Poland) Rafal Kaczor (Russia) Georgy Balakshin
Europe	1st Qualifier	2	(Hungary) Norbert Kalucza (United Kingdom) Khalid Saeed Yafai
Europe	2nd Qualifier	2	(Turkey) Furkan Ulaş Memiş (France) Jérôme Thomas
Oceania	World Championships	0	
Oceania	Oceania Championships	1	(Australia) Stephen Sutherland
TOTAL		27	

== Bantamweight (-54kg) ==
Event		Vacancies	Qualified
Africa	World Championships	0	
Africa	1st Qualifier	3	(Algeria) Abdelhalim Ouradi (Morocco) Hicham Mesbahi (Botswana) Khumiso Ikgopoleng
Africa	2nd Qualifier	2	(Ghana) Issah Samir (Mauritius) Bruno Julie; ~~(Tanzania) Emilian Polino~~
Africa	Re-allocation Places	1	(Lesotho) Thabiso Nketu
Asia	World Championships	2	(Mongolia) Enkhbatyn Badar-Uugan (China) Gu Yu
Asia	1st Qualifier	2	(India) Akhil Kumar (Thailand) Worapoj Petchkoom
Asia	2nd Qualifier	3	(Kazakhstan) Kanat Abutalipov (Uzbekistan) Khurshid Tadjibayev (South Korea) Han Soon-Chul
America	World Championships	4	(Puerto Rico) McJoe Arroyo (Colombia) Jonatan Romero; ~~(United States) Gary Russell~~ (Venezuela) Héctor Manzanilla
America	1st Qualifier	2	(Cuba) Yankiel León (Mexico) Óscar Valdez
America	2nd Qualifier	0	
Europe	World Championships	2	(Russia) Sergey Vodopyanov (United Kingdom) Joseph Murray
Europe	1st Qualifier	3	(Republic of Ireland) John Joe Nevin (Moldova) Veaceslav Gojan (Germany) Rustamhodza Rahimov
Europe	2nd Qualifier	3	(France) Ali Hallab (Belarus) Khavazhi Khatsigov (Italy) Vittorio Parrinello
Oceania	World Championships	0	
Oceania	Oceania Championships	1	(Australia) Luke Boyd
TOTAL		27	

== Featherweight (-57kg) ==
Event		Vacancies	Qualified
Africa	World Championships	0	
Africa	1st Qualifier	3	(Morocco) Mahdi Ouatine (Algeria) Abdelkader Chadi (Tunisia) Alaa Shili
Africa	2nd Qualifier	3	(Kenya) Nick Okoth (Botswana) Thato Batshegi (Ghana) Prince Dzanie
Asia	World Championships	3	(China) Li Yang (Thailand) Sailom Adi (India) Anthresh Lalit Lakra
Asia	1st Qualifier	2	(Uzbekistan) Bahodirjon Sultonov (Japan) Satoshi Shimizu
Asia	2nd Qualifier	2	(Kazakhstan) Galib Jafarov (Mongolia) Zorigtbaataryn Enkhzorig
America	World Championships	2	(United States) Raynell Williams (Mexico) Arturo Santos Reyes
America	1st Qualifier	2	(Cuba) Idel Torriente (Ecuador) Luis Enrique Porozo
America	2nd Qualifier	2	(Brazil) Robson Conceiçao (Dominican Republic) Roberto Navarro
Europe	World Championships	3	(Russia) Albert Selimov (Ukraine) Vasyl Lomachenko (Turkey) Yakup Kilic
Europe	1st Qualifier	3	(France) Khedafi Djelkhir (Azerbaijan) Shahin Imranov (Germany) Wilhelm Gratschow
Europe	2nd Qualifier	2	(Italy) Alessio di Savino (Georgia (country)) Nikoloz Izoria
Oceania	World Championships	0	
Oceania	Oceania Championships	1	(Australia) Paul Flemming
TOTAL		28	

== Lightweight (-60kg) ==
Event		Vacancies	Qualified
Africa	World Championships	0	
Africa	1st Qualifier	3	(Tunisia) Saifeddine Nejmaoui (Algeria) Hamza Kramou (Morocco) Tahar Tamsamani
Africa	2nd Qualifier	3	(Madagascar) Jean de Dieu Soloniaina (Nigeria) Rasheed Lawal (Namibia) Julius Indongo
Asia	World Championships	2	(North Korea) Kim Song Guk (Thailand) Pichai Sayotha
Asia	1st Qualifier	2	(China) Hu Qing (South Korea) Baik Jong-Sub
Asia	2nd Qualifier	2	(Kazakhstan) Merey Akshalov (Kyrgyzstan) Asylbek Talasbayev
America	World Championships	1	(Colombia) Darley Perez
America	1st Qualifier	2	(Cuba) Yordenis Ugás (United States) Sadam Ali
America	2nd Qualifier	3	(Puerto Rico) Jose Pedraza (Brazil) Éverton Lopes (Mexico) Francisco Vargas
Europe	World Championships	5	~~(United Kingdom) Frankie Gavin~~ (Italy) Domenico Valentino (Russia) Alexey Tishchenko (Turkey) Onur Sipal (Armenia) Hrachik Javakhyan
Europe	1st Qualifier	2	(Ukraine) Olexandr Klyuchko (Hungary) Miklos Varga
Europe	2nd Qualifier	2	(France) Daouda Sow (Romania) Georgian Popescu
Oceania	World Championships	0	
Oceania	Oceania Championships	1	(Australia) Anthony Little
TOTAL		27	

== Light Welterweight (-64kg) ==
Event		Vacancies	Qualified
Africa	World Championships	0	
Africa	1st Qualifier	3	(Morocco) Driss Moussaid (Tunisia) Hamza Hassini (Zambia) Hastings Bwalya
Africa	2nd Qualifier	3	(Mauritius) Richarno Colin (Ghana) Samuel Kotey Neequaye (Cameroon) Mahaman Smaila
Asia	World Championships	3	(Kazakhstan) Serik Sapiyev (Japan) Masatsugu Kawachi (Iran) Morteza Sepahvand
Asia	1st Qualifier	2	(Thailand) Manus Boonjumnong (China) Maimaitituersun Qiong
Asia	2nd Qualifier	1	(Mongolia) Uranchimegiin Mönkh-Erdene
America	World Championships	0	
America	1st Qualifier	3	(Cuba) Roniel Iglesias (Venezuela) Jonny Sanchez (United States) Javier Molina
America	2nd Qualifier	3	(Puerto Rico) Jonathan González (Dominican Republic) Manuel Félix Díaz (Brazil) Myke Carvalho
Europe	World Championships	5	(Russia) Gennady Kovalev (United Kingdom) Bradley Saunders (Armenia) Eduard Hambardzumyan (France) Alexis Vastine (Bulgaria) Boris Georgiev
Europe	1st Qualifier	2	(Hungary) Gyula Kate (Romania) Ionut Gheorghe
Europe	2nd Qualifier	2	(Republic of Ireland) John Joe Joyce (Lithuania) Egidijus Kavaliauskas
Oceania	World Championships	0	
Oceania	Oceania Championships	1	(Australia) Todd Kidd
TOTAL		28	

== Welterweight (-69kg) ==
Event		Vacancies	Qualified
Africa	World Championships	0	
Africa	1st Qualifier	2	(Egypt) Hosam Bakr Abdin (Cameroon) Joseph Mulema; ~~(Algeria) Choayeb Oussassi~~
Africa	2nd Qualifier	2	(Namibia) Mujandjae Kasuto; ~~(Kenya) Nickson Abaka~~ (Morocco) Mehdi Khalsi
Africa	Re-allocation Places	2	(Central African Republic) Bruno Bongongo (Zambia) Precious Makina
Asia	World Championships	3	(Thailand) Non Boonjumnong (China) Hanati Silamu (Kazakhstan) Bakhyt Sarsekbayev
Asia	1st Qualifier	2	(South Korea) Kim Jung-Joo (Uzbekistan) Dilshod Mahmudov
Asia	2nd Qualifier	1	(Turkmenistan) Aliasker Bashirov
America	World Championships	2	(United States) Demetrius Andrade (Canada) Adam Trupish
America	1st Qualifier	2	(Cuba) Carlos Banteaux (United States Virgin Islands) John Jackson
America	2nd Qualifier	2	(Dominican Republic) Gilbert Lenin Castillo (The Bahamas) Tureano Johnson
Europe	World Championships	3	(Turkey) Adem Kilicci (Moldova) Vitalie Gruşac (Germany) Jack Culcay-Keth
Europe	1st Qualifier	3	(Belarus) Mahamed Nurudzinau (Ukraine) Oleksandr Stretskyy (United Kingdom) Billy Joe Saunders
Europe	2nd Qualifier	3	(France) Jaoid Chiguer (Georgia (country)) Kakhaber Zhvania (Russia) Andrey Balanov
Oceania	World Championships	0	
Oceania	Oceania Championships	1	(Australia) Gerard O'Mahony
Tripartite Commission Invitation		1	(Grenada) Rolande Moses
TOTAL		29	

== Middleweight (-75kg) ==
Event		Vacancies	Qualified
Africa	World Championships	1	(Morocco) Said Rachidi
Africa	1st Qualifier	3	(Egypt) Mohamed Hikal (Ghana) Ahmed Saraku (Algeria) Nabil Kassel
Africa	2nd Qualifier	2	(The Gambia) Badou Jack (Democratic Republic of the Congo) Herry Saliku Biembe
Asia	World Championships	2	(Kazakhstan) Bakhtiyar Artayev (China) Wang Jianzheng
Asia	1st Qualifier	2	(Thailand) Angkhan Chomphuphuang (Uzbekistan) Elshod Rasulov
Asia	2nd Qualifier	2	(India) Vijender Kumar (South Korea) Cho Deok-Jin
America	World Championships	2	(Venezuela) Alfonso Blanco (Dominican Republic) Argenis Casimiro
America	1st Qualifier	2	(Cuba) Emilio Correa (Ecuador) Carlos Góngora
America	2nd Qualifier	2	(United States) Shawn Estrada (Argentina) Ezequiel Maderna
Europe	World Championships	3	(Russia) Matvey Korobov (Ukraine) Sergiy Derevyanchenko (Germany) Konstantin Buga
Europe	1st Qualifier	3	(Sweden) Naim Terbunja (United Kingdom) James DeGale (Armenia) Andranik Hakobyan
Europe	2nd Qualifier	3	(Republic of Ireland) Darren Sutherland (France) Jean-Mickaël Raymond (Greece) Georgios Gazis
Oceania	World Championships	0	
Oceania	Oceania Championships	1	(Australia) Jarrod Fletcher
TOTAL		28	

== Light Heavyweight (-81kg) ==
Event		Vacancies	Qualified
Africa	World Championships	1	(Egypt) Ramadan Yasser
Africa	1st Qualifier	2	(Algeria) Abdelhafid Benchebla (Tunisia) Mourad Sahraoui
Africa	2nd Qualifier	3	(Ghana) Bastir Samir (Kenya) Aziz Ali (Nigeria) Dauda Izobo
Asia	World Championships	2	(Uzbekistan) Abbos Atoev (Kazakhstan) Yerkebuian Shynaliyev
Asia	1st Qualifier	2	(Tajikistan) Djakhon Kurbanov (China) Zhang Xiaoping
Asia	2nd Qualifier	2	(Iran) Mehdi Ghorbani (India) Dinesh Kumar
America	World Championships	0	
America	1st Qualifier	3	(Puerto Rico) Carlos Negron (Venezuela) Luis González (Brazil) Washington Silva
America	2nd Qualifier	3	(Colombia) Eleider Alvarez (United States Virgin Islands) Julius Jackson (Haiti) Azea Austinama
Europe	World Championships	5	(Russia) Artur Beterbiev (Lithuania) Daugirdas Semiotas (Hungary) Imre Szellő (Croatia) Marijo Sivolija (United Kingdom) Tony Jeffries
Europe	1st Qualifier	1	~~(Ukraine) Ismayl Sillakh~~ (Belarus) Ramazan Magamedau
Europe	2nd Qualifier	2	(Republic of Ireland) Kenneth Egan (Sweden) Kennedy Katende
Europe	Re-allocation Places	1	(Turkey) Bahram Muzaffer
Oceania	World Championships	0	
Oceania	Oceania Championships	1	(Samoa) Satupaitea Farani Tavui
TOTAL		28	

== Heavyweight (-91kg) ==
Event		Vacancies	Qualified
Africa	World Championships	0	
Africa	1st Qualifier	2	(Algeria) Abdelaziz Touilbini (Morocco) Mohamed Arjaoui
Africa	2nd Qualifier	1	(Nigeria) Olanrewaju Durodola
Asia	World Championships	1	(China) Yushan Nijiati
Asia	1st Qualifier	1	(Iran) Ali Mazaheri
Asia	2nd Qualifier	0	
America	World Championships	0	
America	1st Qualifier	2	(Cuba) Osmay Acosta (United States) Deontay Wilder
America	2nd Qualifier	1	(Colombia) Deivi Julio Blanco
Europe	World Championships	3	(Italy) Clemente Russo (Russia) Rakhim Chakhkeiv (France) John M'Bumba
Europe	1st Qualifier	2	(Belarus) Viktar Zuyeu (Ukraine) Oleksandr Usyk
Europe	2nd Qualifier	2	(Montenegro) Milorad Gajovic (Greece) Elias Pavlidis
Oceania	World Championships	0	
Oceania	Oceania Championships	1	(Australia) Bradley Pitt
TOTAL		16	

== Super Heavyweight (+91kg) ==
Event		Vacancies	Qualified
Africa	World Championships	0	
Africa	1st Qualifier	1	(Algeria) Newfel Ouatah
Africa	2nd Qualifier	2	(Morocco) Mohamed Amanissi (Nigeria) Onorede Ehwareme
Asia	World Championships	1	(China) Zhang Zhilei
Asia	1st Qualifier	0	
Asia	2nd Qualifier	1	(Kazakhstan) Ruslan Myrsatayev
America	World Championships	0	
America	1st Qualifier	1	(Cuba) Robert Alfonso
America	2nd Qualifier	2	(Venezuela) José Payares (Colombia) Oscar Rivas
Europe	World Championships	3	(Italy) Roberto Cammarelle (Ukraine) Vyacheslav Glazkov (Russia) Islam Timurziev
Europe	1st Qualifier	2	(Bulgaria) Kubrat Pulev (Croatia) Marko Tomasović
Europe	2nd Qualifier	2	(Lithuania) Jaroslavas Jakšto (United Kingdom) David Price
Oceania	World Championships	0	
Oceania	Oceania Championships	1	(Australia) Daniel Beahan
TOTAL		16	
