= 1st AIBA African 2008 Olympic Qualifying Tournament =

Boxing competitions

- Venues: 1
- Location: Algeria
- Dates: January 23 – January 31
- Teams: 21
- Website: tournament website

1st AIBA African Olympic Boxing Qualifying Tournament was held from January 23 to January 31, 2008, in Algiers, Algeria.

== Qualifying ==
21 teams participated in this tournament:

- Algeria (11)
- Burkina Faso (2)
- Botswana (4)
- Egypt (6)
- Ethiopia (6)
- Ghana (9)
- Kenya (4)
- Lesotho (3)
- Morocco (10)
- Namibia (5)
- Nigeria (1)
- Central African Republic (3)
- Cameroon (7)
- Democratic Republic of the Congo (1)
- South Africa (5)
- Senegal (4)
- Seychelles (2)
- Swaziland (2)
- Tanzania (3)
- Tunisia (6)
- Zambia (2)

Number in ( ) is total boxer in each country

== Competition System ==
The competition system of the 1st AIBA African Olympic Boxing Qualifying Tournament is the knockout round system. Each boxer fights one match per round.

== Super heavyweight ==
The Super Heavyweight class in the 1st AIBA African Olympic Boxing Qualifying Tournament competition was the lightest class. Super Heavyweights were limited to those boxers weighing more than 91 kilograms.

=== List of boxers ===
- Mohamed Amanissi (MAR)
- Haruna Osumanu (GHA)
- Newfel Ouatah (ALG)
- Stephane Gomis (SEN)

=== Medalists ===
Gold	Newfel Ouatah; Algeria

=== Results ===
==== Semifinal Round ====
3rd day
Mohamed Amanissi (MAR)	RET R2	Haruna Osumanu (GHA)
Newfel Ouatah (ALG)	17 – 6	Stephane Gomis (SEN)

==== Final Round ====
5th day
Mohamed Amanissi (MAR)	6 – 21	Newfel Ouatah (ALG)

=== Qualification to Olympic games ===
- Newfel Ouatah (ALG)

== Heavyweight ==
The Heavyweight class in the 1st AIBA African Olympic Boxing Qualifying Tournament competition was the lightest class. Heavyweights were limited to those boxers weighing between 81 - 91 kilograms.

=== List of boxers ===
- Abdelaziz Touilbini (ALG)
- Boyomo david Assiene (CMR)
- Tobias Mabuta Munihango (NAM)
- Awusone Yekeni (GHA)
- Mohamed Arjaoui (MAR)

=== Medalists ===
Gold	Abdelaziz Touilbini; Algeria
Silver	Mohamed Arjaoui; Morocco
Bronze	Boyomo david Assiene; Cameroon
Bronze	Tobias Mabuta Munihango; Namibia

=== Results ===
==== Quarterfinal Round ====
2nd day
Awusone Yekeni (GHA)	9 - 14	Mohamed Arjaoui (MAR)

==== Semifinal Round ====
3rd day
Abdelaziz Touilbini (ALG)	RSC R3	Boyomo david Assiene (CMR)
Tobias Mabuta Munihango (NAM)	6 - 10	Mohamed Arjaoui (MAR)

==== Final Round ====
5th day
Abdelaziz Touilbini (ALG)	18 - 2	Mohamed Arjaoui (MAR)

=== Qualification to Olympic games ===
- Abdelaziz Touilbini (ALG)
- Mohamed Arjaoui (MAR)

== Light heavyweight ==
The Light Heavyweight class in the 1st AIBA African Olympic Boxing Qualifying Tournament competition was the lightest class. Light Heavyweights were limited to those boxers weighing between 75 – 81 kilograms.

=== list of boxers ===
- Bastir Samir (GHA)
- Abdelhafid Benchebla (ALG)
- Zouhair Boustane (MAR)
- Unathi Jacobs (RSA)
- Assane Faye (SEN)
- Mourad Sahraoui (TUN)

=== Medalists ===
Gold	Abdelhafid Benchebla; Algeria

=== Results ===
==== Quarterfinal round ====
2nd day
Zouhair Boustane (MAR)	9 – 27	Unathi Jacobs (RSA)
Assane Faye (SEN)	4 – 19	Mourad Sahraoui (TUN)

==== Semifinal round ====
3rd day
Bastir Samir (GHA)	8 – 27	Abdelhafid Benchebla (ALG)
Unathi Jacobs (RSA)	3 – 14	Mourad Sahraoui (TUN)

==== Final Round ====
5th day
Abdelhafid Benchebla (ALG)	WO	Mourad Sahraoui (TUN)

=== Qualification to Olympic games ===
- Abdelhafid Benchebla (ALG)
- Mourad Sahraoui (TUN)

== Middleweight ==
The Middleweight class in the 1st AIBA African Olympic Boxing Qualifying Tournament competition was the lightest class. Middleweights were limited to those boxers weighing between 69 – 75 kilograms.

=== List of boxers ===
- Odilo Machichi Leonard (TAN)
- Nabil Kassel (ALG)
- Jean Baptiste Bekondji (CMR)
- Mohamed Hikal (EGY)
- Daniel Shisia (KEN)
- Biembe Marco Herry Saliku (COD)
- Mosolesa Tsie (LES)
- Ahmed Saraku (GHA)

=== Medalists ===
Gold	Mohamed Hikal; Egypt

=== Results ===
==== Quarterfinal Round ====
2nd day
Odilo Machichi Leonard (TAN)	11 – 16	Nabil Kassel (ALG)
Jean Baptiste Bekondji (CMR)	3 – 20	Mohamed Hikal (EGY)
Daniel Shisia (KEN)	15 – 5	Biembe Marco Herry Saliku (COD)
Mosolesa Tsie (LES)	RET R3	Ahmed Saraku (GHA)

==== Semifinal Round ====
3rd day
Nabil Kassel (ALG)	7 – 17	Mohamed Hikal (EGY)
Daniel Shisia (KEN)	0 – 14	Ahmed Saraku (GHA)

==== 3rd place Round ====
4th day
Nabil Kassel (ALG)	17 – 8	Daniel Shisia (KEN)

==== Final Round ====
5th day
Mohamed Hikal (EGY)	11 – 4	Ahmed Saraku (GHA)

=== Qualification to Olympic games ===
- Mohamed Hikal (EGY)
- Ahmed Saraku (GHA)
- Nabil Kassel (ALG)

== Welterweight ==
The Welterweight class in the 1st AIBA African Olympic Boxing Qualifying Tournament competition was the lightest class. Welterweights were limited to those boxers weighing between 64 – 69 kilograms.

=== list of boxers ===
- Mujandjae Kasuto (NAM)
- Joseph Mulema (CMR)
- Rached Merdassi (TUN)
- Moses Kopo (LES)
- Mehdi Khalsi (MAR)
- Choayeb Oussassi (ALG)
- Hosam Bakr Abdin (EGY)
- Bruno Bongongo (CAF)

=== Medalists ===
Gold	Hosam Bakr Abdin; Egypt

=== Results ===
==== Quarterfinal Round ====
2nd day
Mujandjae Kasuto (NAM)	2 – 19	Joseph Mulema (CMR)
Rached Merdassi (TUN)	6 – 3	Moses Kopo (LES)
Mehdi Khalsi (MAR)	13 – 25	Choayeb Oussassi (ALG)
Hosam Bakr Abdin (EGY)	RSCOS R2	Bruno Bongongo (CAF)

==== Semifinal Round ====
3rd day
Joseph Mulema (CMR)	DSQ R3	Rached Merdassi (TUN)
Choayeb Oussassi (ALG)	6 – 16	Hosam Bakr Abdin (EGY)

==== 3rd place Round ====
4th day
Rached Merdassi (TUN)	WO	Choayeb Oussassi (ALG)

==== Final Round ====
5th day
Joseph Mulema (CMR)	3 – 14	Hosam Bakr Abdin (EGY)

=== Qualification to Olympic games ===
- Hosam Bakr Abdin (EGY)
- Joseph Mulema (CMR)
- Choayeb Oussassi (ALG)

== Light Welterweight ==
The Light Welterweight class in the 1st AIBA African Olympic Boxing Qualifying Tournament competition was the lightest class. Light Welterweights were limited to those boxers weighing between 60 - 64 kilograms.

=== List of boxers ===
- Rachid Tariket (ALG)
- Hastings Bwalya (ZAM)
- Driss Moussaid (MAR)
- Rayton Okwiri (KEN)
- Abdel Rahman Salah Oraby (EGY)
- Sanuel Kotey Neequaye (GHA)
- Bao Abdou Aziz M (SEN)
- Hassane Mabalouit (BUR)
- Hamza Hassini (TUN)
- Herbert Goabaone Nkabiti (BOT)
- Tewolde Desta (ETH)
- Hashim Simon Petro (TAN)

=== Medalists ===
Gold	Driss Moussaid; Morocco

=== Results ===
==== Preliminary round ====
1st day
Abdel Rahman Salah Oraby (EGY)	28 - 21	Sanuel Kotey Neequaye (GHA)
Bao Abdou Aziz M (SEN)	WO	Hassane Mabalouit (BUR)
Hamza Hassini (TUN)	RSCOS R3	Herbert Goabaone Nkabiti (BOT)
Tewolde Desta (ETH)	RSCI R3	Hashim Simon Petro (TAN)

==== Quarterfinal round ====
2nd day
Rachid Tariket (ALG)	2 - 16	Hastings Bwalya (ZAM)
Driss Moussaid (MAR)	30 - 13	Rayton Okwiri (KEN)
Abdel Rahman Salah Oraby (EGY)	RSCOS R3	Bao Abdou Aziz M (SEN)
Hamza Hassini (TUN)	24 - 2	Hashim Simon Petro (TAN)

==== Semifinal round ====
3rd day
Hastings Bwalya (ZAM)	21 - 22	Driss Moussaid (MAR)
Abdel Rahman Salah Oraby (EGY)	9 - 21	Hamza Hassini (TUN)

==== 3rd place Round ====
4th day
Hastings Bwalya (ZAM)	21 - 3	Abdel Rahman Salah Oraby (EGY)

==== Final round ====
5th day
Driss Moussaid (MAR)	17 - 8	Hamza Hassini (TUN)

=== Qualification to Olympic games ===
- Driss Moussaid (MAR)
- Hamza Hassini (TUN)
- Hastings Bwalya (ZAM)

== Lightweight ==
- The Lightweight class in the 1st AIBA African Olympic Boxing Qualifying Tournament competition was the lightest class. Lightweights were limited to those boxers weighing between 57 - 60 kilograms.

=== List of boxers ===
- Gaolatlhe Mpotsang (BOT)
- Saifeddine Nejmaoui (TUN)
- Brice Rotaric Bassole (BUR)
- Frederik Lawson (GHA)
- Daniel Tadele (ETH)
- Tahar Tamsamani (MAR)
- Achille Apie (CMR)
- Gaber Abdelhamid Yasin (EGY)
- Owethu Mbira (RSA)
- Hamza Kramou (ALG)
- Jean Paul Melly (SEY)
- Julius Indongo (NAM)

=== Medalists ===
Gold	Saifeddine Nejmaoui; Tunisia

=== Results ===
==== Preliminary round ====
1st day
Daniel Tadele (ETH)	RSCOS R3	Tahar Tamsamani (MAR)
Achille Apie (CMR)	RSC R3	Gaber Abdelhamid Yasin (EGY)
Owethu Mbira (RSA)	12 - 14	Hamza Kramou (ALG)
Jean Paul Melly (SEY)	3 - 26	Julius Indongo (NAM)

==== Quarterfinal Round ====
2nd day
Gaolatlhe Mpotsang (BOT)	5 - 18	Saifeddine Nejmaoui (TUN)
Brice Rotaric Bassole (BUR)	WO	Frederik Lawson (GHA)
Tahar Tamsamani (MAR)	RSCOS R3	Achille Apie (CMR)
Hamza Kramou (ALG)	17 - 10	Julius Indongo (NAM)

==== Semifinal Round ====
3rd day
Saifeddine Nejmaoui (TUN)	19 - 7	Frederik Lawson (GHA)
Tahar Tamsamani (MAR)	10 - 25	Hamza Kramou (ALG)

==== 3rd place Round ====
4th day
Frederik Lawson (GHA)	RET R3	Tahar Tamsamani (MAR)

==== Final Round ====
5th day
Saifeddine Nejmaoui (TUN)	11 - 4	Hamza Kramou (ALG)

=== Qualification to Olympic games ===
- Saifeddine Nejmaoui (TUN)
- Hamza Kramou (ALG)
- Tahar Tamsamani (MAR)

== Featherweight ==
The Featherweight class in the 1st AIBA African Olympic Boxing Qualifying Tournament competition was the lightest class. Featherweights were limited to those boxers weighing between 54–57 kilograms (119–126 lb).

=== List of boxers ===
- Abdon Hyacenthe Mewoli (CMR)
- Emanuel Thabiso Nketu (LES)
- Mahdi Ouatine (MAR)
- Tibust Mendes (SEN)
- Abdelkader Chadi (ALG)
- Thato Batshegi (BOT)
- Prince Octopus Dzanie (GHA)
- David Munyasia (KEN)
- Larme Mhlongo (CAF)
- Alaa Shili (TUN)
- Siraj Mulugeta (ETH)
- Mohamed Eliwa Ramadan (EGY)

=== Preliminary round ===
1st day
Abdelkader Chadi (ALG)	RSCOS R3	Thato Batshegi (BOT)
Prince Octopus Dzanie (GHA)	19 - 6	David Munyasia (KEN)
Larme Mhlongo (CAF)	5 - 18	Alaa Shili (TUN)
Siraj Mulugeta (ETH)	RSCOS R2	Mohamed Eliwa Ramadan (EGY)

=== Quarterfinal round ===
2nd day
Abdon Hyacenthe Mewoli (CMR)	4 - 16	Emanuel Thabiso Nketu (LES)
Mahdi Ouatine (MAR)	15 - 9	Tibust Mendes (SEN)
Abdelkader Chadi (ALG)	19 - 3	Prince Octopus Dzanie (GHA)
Alaa Shili (TUN)	14 - 9	Mohamed Eliwa Ramadan (EGY)

=== Semifinal round ===
3rd day
Emanuel Thabiso Nketu (LES)	4 - 12	Mahdi Ouatine (MAR)
Abdelkader Chadi (ALG)	23 - 14	Alaa Shili (TUN)

=== 3rd place Round ===
4th day
Emanuel Thabiso Nketu (LES)	RSCI R4	Alaa Shili (TUN)

=== Final round ===
5th day
Mahdi Ouatine (MAR)	WO	Abdelkader Chadi (ALG)

=== Qualification to Olympic games ===
- Mahdi Ouatine (MAR)
- Abdelkader Chadi (ALG)
- Alaa Shili (TUN)

== Bantamweight ==
- The Bantamweight class in the 1st AIBA African Olympic Boxing Qualifying Tournament competition.

=== List of boxers ===
- Hicham Mesbahi (MAR)
- Issah Samir (GHA)
- Tewodros Tilahun (ETH)
- Joseph Mhlongo (RSA)
- Alla Mohamed Abdel Rehim Rezk (EGY)
- Khumiso Ikgopoleng (BOT)
- Justin Ketchemi (CMR)
- Emilian Polino (TAN)
- Immanuel Naidjala (NAM)
- Dabore Aboubacar Issaka (NGR)
- Abdelhalim Ouradi (ALG)

=== Medalists ===
Gold	Abdelhalim Ouradi; Algeria

=== Preliminary round ===
1st day
Khumiso Ikgopoleng (BOT)	22 - 6	Justin Ketchemi (CMR)
Emilian Polino (TAN)	10 - 17	Immanuel Naidjala (NAM)
Dabore Aboubacar Issaka (NGR)	DSQ	Abdelhalim Ouradi (ALG)

=== Quarterfinal Round ===
2nd day
Hicham Mesbahi (MAR)	22 - 6	Issah Samir (GHA)
Tewodros Tilahun (ETH)	1 - 22	Joseph Mhlongo (RSA)
Alla Mohamed Abdel Rehim Rezk (EGY)	12 - 13	Khumiso Ikgopoleng (BOT)
Immanuel Naidjala (NAM)	5 - 12	Abdelhalim Ouradi (ALG)

=== Semifinal Round ===
3rd day
Hicham Mesbahi (MAR)	11 - 1	Joseph Mhlongo (RSA)
Khumiso Ikgopoleng (BOT)	RET R2	Abdelhalim Ouradi (ALG)

=== 3rd place Round ===
4th day
Joseph Mhlongo (RSA)	4 - 13	Khumiso Ikgopoleng (BOT)

=== Final Round ===
5th day
Hicham Mesbahi (MAR)	0 - 6	Abdelhalim Ouradi (ALG)

=== Qualification to Olympic games ===
- Abdelhalim Ouradi (ALG)
- Hicham Mesbahi (MAR)
- Khumiso Ikgopoleng (BOT)

== Flyweight ==
- The Flyweight class in the 1st AIBA African Olympic Boxing Qualifying Tournament competition was the lightest class. Flyweights were limited to those boxers weighing between 48 - 51 kilograms.

=== List of boxers ===
- Jackson Chauke (RSA)
- Walid Cherif (TUN)
- Dave Cesar (SEY)
- Molla Getachew (ETH)
- Evance Chungu (ZAM)
- Makassi Berlin Arthur Mbenguia (CAF)
- Abderrahim Mechenouai (ALG)
- Abdelillah Nhaila (MAR)
- Vusi Simelane (SWZ)

=== Medalists ===
Gold	Walid Cherif; Tunisia

=== Preliminary round ===
1st day
Abdelillah Nhaila (MAR)	WO	Vusi Simelane (SWZ)

=== Quarterfinal Round ===
2nd day
Jackson Chauke (RSA)	2 - 9	Walid Cherif (TUN)
Dave Cesar (SEY)	4 - 20	Molla Getachew (ETH)
Evance Chungu (ZAM)	8 - 6	Makassi Berlin Arthur Mbenguia (CAF)
Abderrahim Mechenouai (ALG)	6 - 17	Abdelillah Nhaila (MAR)

=== Semifinal Round ===
3rd day
Walid Cherif (TUN)	13 - 1	Molla Getachew (ETH)
Evance Chungu (ZAM)	6 - 19	Abdelillah Nhaila (MAR)

=== 3rd place Round ===
4th day
Molla Getachew (ETH)	16 - 1	Evance Chungu (ZAM)

=== Final Round ===
5th day
Walid Cherif (TUN)	19 - 1	Abdelillah Nhaila (MAR)

=== Qualification to Olympic games ===
- Walid Cherif (TUN)
- Abdelillah Nhaila (MAR)
- Molla Getachew (ETH)

== Light flyweight ==
The Light Flyweight class in the 1st AIBA African Olympic Boxing Qualifying Tournament competition was the lightest class. Light flyweights were limited to those boxers weighing less than 48 kilograms.

=== List of boxers ===
- Thomas Essomba (CMR)
- Lebogang Pilane (RSA)
- Natnael Getenet (ETH)
- Redouane Boubraouat (ALG)
- Simanga Shiba (SWZ)
- Suleiman Bilali (KEN)
- Jafet Uutoni (NAM)
- Redouane Bouchtouck (MAR)
- Manyo Plange (GHA)

=== Medalists ===
Gold	Jafet Uutoni; Namibia
Silver	Suleiman Bilali; Kenya
Bronze	Manyo Plange; Ghana

=== Results ===
==== Preliminary round ====
1st day
Thomas Essomba (CMR)	28 - 11	Lebogang Pilane (RSA)

==== Quarterfinal Round ====
2nd day
Natnael Getenet (ETH)	15 - 32	Redouane Boubraouat (ALG)
Simanga Shiba (SWZ)	RSCOS R3	Suleiman Bilali (KEN)
Jafet Uutoni (NAM)	18 - 9	Redouane Bouchtouck (MAR)
Manyo Plange (GHA)	24 - 10	Thomas Essomba (CMR)

==== Semifinal Round ====
3rd day
Redouane Boubraouat (ALG)	8 - 32	Suleiman Bilali (KEN)
Jafet Uutoni (NAM)	22 - 7	Manyo Plange (GHA)

==== 3rd place Round ====
4th day
Redouane Boubraouat (ALG)	10 - 27	Manyo Plange (GHA)

==== Final Round ====
5th day
Suleiman Bilali (KEN)	RET 4	Jafet Uutoni (NAM)

=== Qualification to Olympic games ===
- Jafet Uutoni (NAM)
- Suleiman Bilali (KEN)
- Manyo Plange (GHA)

== Medal summary ==
Event	Gold	Silver	Bronze
Light flyweight	(Namibia) Jafet Uutoni	(Kenya) Suleiman Bilali	(Ghana) Manyo Plange
Flyweight	(Tunisia) Walid Cherif	(Morocco) Abdelillah Nhaila	(Ethiopia) Molla Getachew
Bantamweight	(Algeria) Abdelhalim Ouradi	(Morocco) Hicham Mesbahi	(Botswana) Khumiso Ikgopoleng
Featherweight	(Morocco) Mahdi Ouatine	(Algeria) Abdelkader Chadi	(Tunisia) Alaa Shili
Lightweight	(Tunisia) Saifeddine Nejmaoui	(Algeria) Hamza Kramou	(Morocco) Tahar Tamsamani
Light Welterweight	(Morocco) Driss Moussaid	(Tunisia) Hamza Hassini	(Zambia) Hastings Bwalya
Welterweight	(Egypt) Hosam Bakr Abdin	(Cameroon) Joseph Mulema	(Algeria) Choayeb Oussassi
Middleweight	(Egypt) Mohamed Hikal	(Ghana) Ahmed Saraku	(Algeria) Nabil Kassel
Light Heavyweight	(Algeria) Abdelhafid Benchebla	(Tunisia) Mourad Sahraoui	(Ghana) Bastir Samir (South Africa) Unathi Jacobs
Heavyweight	(Algeria) Abdelaziz Touilbini	(Morocco) Mohamed Arjaoui	(Cameroon) Boyomo David Assiene (Namibia) Tobias Mabuta Munihango
Super Heavyweight	(Algeria) Newfel Ouatah	(Morocco) Mohamed Amanissi	(Senegal) Stephane Gomis (Ghana) Haruna Osumanu

== Medal table ==
Rank	Nation	Gold	Silver	Bronze	Total
1	Algeria	4	2	2	8
2	Morocco	2	4	1	7
3	Tunisia	2	2	1	5
4	Egypt	2	0	0	2
5	Namibia	1	0	1	2
6	Ghana	0	1	2	3
7	Cameroon	0	1	1	2
8	Kenya	0	1	0	1
9	Botswana	0	0	1	1
9	Ethiopia	0	0	1	1
9	Senegal	0	0	1	1
9	South Africa	0	0	1	1
9	Zambia	0	0	1	1
Totals (13 entries)		11	11	13	35

== Symbol of AIBA ==
KO	DSQ	BDSQ	JURY	RSC	RSCH	RSCI	RSCOS	NC	WO	RET	R
Knockout	Disqualified	Both disqualified	Result determined by jury votes	Referee stop contest	Referee stop contest by head blow	Referee stop contest by injured	Referee stop contest outscored	No contest	Walkover	Retired	Round

== See also ==
- 1st AIBA African Olympic Boxing Qualifying Tournament
- 1st AIBA European 2008 Olympic Qualifying Tournament
- 2nd AIBA African 2008 Olympic Qualifying Tournament
