= Boxing at the 2008 Summer Olympics – Light welterweight =

Boxing competitions

The light welterweight amateur boxing competition was the median weight class at the 2008 Summer Olympics. The competition was held at the Workers Indoor Arena. Light welterweights were limited to a maximum of 64 kilograms in body mass.

Like all Olympic boxing events, the competition was a straight single-elimination tournament. Both semifinal losers were awarded bronze medals, so no boxers competed again after their first loss. Bouts consisted of four rounds of two minutes each, with one-minute breaks between rounds. Punches scored only if the white area on the front of the glove made full contact with the front of the head or torso of the opponent. Five judges scored each bout; three of the judges had to signal a scoring punch within one second for the punch to score. The winner of the bout was the boxer who scored the most valid punches by the end of the bout.

== Medalists ==
Gold	Manuel Félix Díaz; Dominican Republic
Silver	Manus Boonjumnong; Thailand
Bronze	Alexis Vastine; France
Bronze	Roniel Iglesias; Cuba

== Draw ==
All times are China Standard Time (UTC+8)

Round of 32; Sunday, August 10, 2008; 13:30-15:15 & 19:00-20:30
Maimaitituersun Qiong (CHN)	8
Gennady Kovalev (RUS)	15
Myke Carvalho (BRA)	11
Richarno Colin (MRI)	15
Driss Moussaid (MAR)	23
Todd Kidd (AUS)	2
Roniel Iglesias (CUB)	15
Mahaman Smaila (CMR)	1
John Joe Joyce (IRL)	9
Gyula Káté (HUN)	5
Manuel Félix Díaz (DOM)	11
Eduard Hambardzumyan (ARM)	4
Morteza Sepahvand (IRI)	16
Hamza Hassini (TUN)	4
Ionuţ Gheorghe (ROU)	21
Jonathan González (PUR)	4
Uranchimegiin Mönkh-Erdene (MGL)	12
Hastings Bwalya (ZAM)	8
Boris Georgiev (BUL)	14
Javier Molina (USA)	1
Samuel Kotey Neequaye (GHA)
Bradley Saunders (GBR)	KO
Alexis Vastine (FRA)	13
Egidijus Kavaliauskas (LTU)	2

Round of 16; Thursday, August 14, 2008; 19:00-21:00
Serik Sapiyev (KAZ)	22
Jonny Sánchez (VEN)	3
Manus Boonjumnong (THA)	8
Masatsugu Kawachi (JPN)	1
Gennady Kovalev (RUS)	11
Richarno Colin (MRI)	2
Driss Moussaid (MAR)	4
Roniel Iglesias (CUB)	15
John Joe Joyce (IRL)	11
Manuel Félix Díaz (DOM)	+11
Morteza Sepahvand (IRI)	8
Ionuţ Gheorghe (ROU)	4
Uranchimegiin Mönkh-Erdene (MGL)	10
Boris Georgiev (BUL)	3
Bradley Saunders (GBR)	7
Alexis Vastine (FRA)	11

Quarterfinals; Sunday, August 17, 2008; 19:00-20:00
Serik Sapiyev (KAZ)	5
Manus Boonjumnong (THA)	7
Gennady Kovalev (RUS)	2
Roniel Iglesias (CUB)	5
Manuel Félix Díaz (DOM)	11
Morteza Sepahvand (IRI)	6
Uranchimegiin Mönkh-Erdene (MGL)	4
Alexis Vastine (FRA)	12

Semifinals; Friday, August 22, 2008; 14:31-15:00
Manus Boonjumnong (THA)	10
Roniel Iglesias (CUB)	5
Manuel Félix Díaz (DOM)	12
Alexis Vastine (FRA)	10

Final; Saturday, August 23, 2008; 20:11-20:31
Manus Boonjumnong (THA)	4
Manuel Félix Díaz (DOM)	12

== See also ==
- 2009 World Amateur Boxing Championships – Light welterweight
