= 2nd AIBA African 2008 Olympic Qualifying Tournament =

Boxing competitions

- Venues: 1
- Location: Namibia
- Dates: March 24 – March 29
- Website: tournament website

The 2nd AIBA African Olympic Boxing Qualifying Tournament was held from 24 March to 29 March 2008 in Windhoek, Namibia. It was held at the Gymnasium Hall of the University of Namibia.

== Qualifying ==
28 teams participated in this tournament:

== Competition System ==
The competition system just like at the 1st AIBA African 2008 Olympic Qualifying Tournament is the knockout round system. Each boxer fights one match per round.

== Qualified Boxers ==
Event	Gold	Silver	Bronze
Light flyweight	(Cameroon) Thomas Essomba	(Morocco) Redouane Bouchtouk	(Uganda) Ronald Serugo
Flyweight	(Zambia) Cassius Chiyanika	(Kenya) Bernard Ngumba	(South Africa) Jackson Chauke
Bantamweight	(Ghana) Issah Samir	(Mauritius) Bruno Julie	(Tanzania) Emilian Polino
Featherweight	(Kenya) Nick Okoth	(Botswana) Thato Batshegi	(Ghana) Prince Dzanie
Lightweight	(Madagascar) Jean de Dieu Soloniaina	(Nigeria) Rasheed Lawal	(Namibia) Julius Indongo
Light Welterweight	(Mauritius) Richarno Colin	(Ghana) Samuel Kotey Neequaye	(Cameroon) Smaila Mahaman
Welterweight	(Namibia) Mujandjae Kasuto	(Kenya) Nickson Abaka	(Morocco) Mehdi Khalsi
Middleweight	(The Gambia) Badou Jack	(Democratic Republic of the Congo) Herry Saliku Biembe	
Light Heavyweight	(Ghana) Bastir Samir	(Kenya) Aziz Ali	(Nigeria) Dauda Izobo
Heavyweight	(Nigeria) Olanrewaju Durodola		
Super Heavyweight	(Morocco) Mohamed Amanissi	(Nigeria) Onorede Ehwareme	

== See also ==
- 1st AIBA African 2008 Olympic Qualifying Tournament
