= Tunisia at the 2008 Summer Olympics =

- IOC code: TUN
- NOC: Tunisian Olympic Committee
- Website: www.cnot.org.tn (in French)

in Beijing
- Competitors: 28 in 10 sports
- Flag bearer: Anis Chedly
- Medals Ranked 52nd: Gold 1 Silver 0 Bronze 0 Total 1

Summer Olympics appearances (overview)
- 1960; 1964; 1968; 1972; 1976; 1980; 1984; 1988; 1992; 1996; 2000; 2004; 2008; 2012; 2016; 2020; 2024

Tunisia competed in the 2008 Summer Olympics held in Beijing, People's Republic of China from August 8 to August 24, 2008. The country was represented by 28 athletes competing in 10 sports.

== Medalists ==
| Medal | Name | Sport | Event |
|---|---|---|---|
| Gold | Oussama Mellouli | Swimming | Men's 1500 m freestyle |

== Athletics ==
Key

- Note – Ranks given for track events are within the athlete's heat only
- Q = Qualified for the next round
- q = Qualified for the next round as a fastest loser or, in field events, by position without achieving the qualifying target
- NR = National record
- N/A = Round not applicable for the event
- Bye = Athlete not required to compete in round

Men
Track & road events

| Athlete | Event | Final | |
| Athlete | Event | Result | Rank |
|---|---|---|---|
| Hatem Ghoula | 20 km walk | 1:23:44 | 27 |
| Hatem Ghoula | 50 km walk | 4:03:47 | 33 |
| Hassanine Sebei | 20 km walk | 1:25:23 | 34 |

Women
Track & road events

| Athlete | Event | Heat | | Final | |
| Athlete | Event | Result | Rank | Result | Rank |
|---|---|---|---|---|---|
| Habiba Ghribi | 3000 m steeplechase | 9:25.50 NR | 5 q | 9:36.43 | 13 |

Field events

| Athlete | Event | Qualification | | Final | |
| Athlete | Event | Distance | Position | Distance | Position |
|---|---|---|---|---|---|
| Leila Ben Youssef | Pole vault | 4.00 | 32 | Did not advance | |

== Boxing ==
Tunisia qualified five boxers for the Olympic boxing tournament. All five boxers qualified at the first African qualifier.

| Athlete | Event | Round of 32 | Round of 16 | Quarterfinals | Semifinals | Final | |
| Athlete | Event | Opposition Result | Opposition Result | Opposition Result | Opposition Result | Opposition Result | Rank |
|---|---|---|---|---|---|---|---|
| Walid Cherif | Flyweight | Sutherland (AUS); W 14–2 | Lee O-S (KOR); W 11–5 | Picardi (ITA); L 5-7 | Did not advance | | |
| Alaa Shili | Featherweight | Gratschow (GER); W 14–5 | Santos (MEX); L 2–14 | Did not advance | | | |
| Saifeddine Nejmaoui | Lightweight | Tishchenko (RUS); L 2–10 | Did not advance | | | | |
| Hamza Hassini | Light welterweight | Sepahvand (IRI); L 4–16 | Did not advance | | | | |
| Mourad Sahraoui | Light heavyweight | Zhang Xp (CHN); L 1–3 | Did not advance | | | | |

== Cycling ==
=== Road ===
| Athlete | Event | Time | Rank |
|---|---|---|---|
| Rafâa Chtioui | Men's road race | 7:03:04 | 87 |

== Fencing ==
Women

| Athlete | Event | Round of 64 | Round of 32 | Round of 16 | Quarterfinal | Semifinal | Final / BM | |
| Athlete | Event | Opposition Score | Opposition Score | Opposition Score | Opposition Score | Opposition Score | Opposition Score | Rank |
|---|---|---|---|---|---|---|---|---|
| Ines Boubakri | Individual foil | Luan (CAN); L 9–13 | Did not advance | | | | | |
| Azza Besbes | Individual sabre | Chetty (RSA); W 15–2 | Perrus (FRA); W 15–11 | Ovtchinnikova (CAN); W 15–12 | Ward (USA); L 14–15 | Did not advance | | |

== Judo ==
Men

| Athlete | Event | Preliminary | Round of 32 | Round of 16 | Quarterfinals | Semifinals | Repechage 1 | Repechage 2 | Repechage 3 | Final / BM | |
| Athlete | Event | Opposition Result | Opposition Result | Opposition Result | Opposition Result | Opposition Result | Opposition Result | Opposition Result | Opposition Result | Opposition Result | Rank |
|---|---|---|---|---|---|---|---|---|---|---|---|
| Youssef Badra | −81 kg | Mrvaljević (MNE); L 0010–0020 | Did not advance | | | | | | | | |
| Anis Chedly | +100 kg | Bye | Riner (FRA); L 0000–0010 | Did not advance | | | | | | | |

Women

| Athlete | Event | Round of 32 | Round of 16 | Quarterfinals | Semifinals | Repechage 1 | Repechage 2 | Repechage 3 | Final / BM | |
| Athlete | Event | Opposition Result | Opposition Result | Opposition Result | Opposition Result | Opposition Result | Opposition Result | Opposition Result | Opposition Result | Rank |
|---|---|---|---|---|---|---|---|---|---|---|
| Chahnez M'barki | −48 kg | Lusnikova (UKR); L 0000–0221 | Did not advance | | | | | | | |
| Nesria Jelassi | −57 kg | Bye | Lupetey (CUB); W 1000–0000 | Pekli (AUS); L 0000–1011 | Did not advance | Bye | Baczkó (HUN); L 0000–1011 | Did not advance | | |
| Houda Miled | −78 kg | Bye | Possamaï (FRA); L 0012–1010 | Did not advance | | | | | | |
| Nihal Chikhrouhou | +78 kg | Chalá (ECU); W 1000–0000 | Kim N-Y (KOR); L 0001–0011 | Did not advance | | | | | | |

== Swimming ==
Men

| Athlete | Event | Heat | | Semifinal | | Final | |
| Athlete | Event | Time | Rank | Time | Rank | Time | Rank |
|---|---|---|---|---|---|---|---|
| Oussama Mellouli | 200 m freestyle | 1:47.97 | 19 | Did not advance | | | |
| Oussama Mellouli | 400 m freestyle | 3:44.54 | 7 Q | — | | 3:43.45 AF | 5 |
| Oussama Mellouli | 1500 m freestyle | 14:47.76 | 6 Q | — | | 14:40.84 AF | 1st place, gold medalist(s) |

Women

| Athlete | Event | Heat | | Semifinal | | Final | |
| Athlete | Event | Time | Rank | Time | Rank | Time | Rank |
|---|---|---|---|---|---|---|---|
| Maroua Mathlouthi | 200 m individual medley | DNS | | Did not advance | | | |
| Maroua Mathlouthi | 400 m individual medley | DNS | | — | | Did not advance | |

== Taekwondo ==
| Athlete | Event | Round of 16 | Quarterfinals | Semifinals | Repechage | Bronze Medal | Final | |
| Athlete | Event | Opposition Result | Opposition Result | Opposition Result | Opposition Result | Opposition Result | Opposition Result | Rank |
|---|---|---|---|---|---|---|---|---|
| Khaoula Ben Hamza | Women's +67 kg | Espinoza (MEX); L 0–4 | Did not advance | | Kedzierska (SWE); L 4–5 | Did not advance | | |

== Tennis ==
| Athlete | Event | Round of 64 | Round of 32 | Round of 16 | Quarterfinals | Semifinals | Final / BM | |
| Athlete | Event | Opposition Score | Opposition Score | Opposition Score | Opposition Score | Opposition Score | Opposition Score | Rank |
|---|---|---|---|---|---|---|---|---|
| Selima Sfar | Women's singles | Wozniacki (DEN); L 4–6, 1–6 | Did not advance | | | | | |

== Weightlifting ==
| Athlete | Event | Snatch | | Clean & Jerk | | Total | Rank |
| Athlete | Event | Result | Rank | Result | Rank | Total | Rank |
|---|---|---|---|---|---|---|---|
| Khalil El Maoui | Men's −56 kg | 126 | 7 | ~~142~~ | DNF | 126 | DNF |
| Hanene Ourfelli | Women's −63 kg | 80 | 16 | 95 | 15 | 175 | 15 |

== Wrestling ==
Key

- VT - Victory by Fall.
- PP - Decision by Points - the loser with technical points.
- PO - Decision by Points - the loser without technical points.

Men's freestyle

| Athlete | Event | Qualification | Round of 16 | Quarterfinal | Semifinal | Repechage 1 | Repechage 2 | Final / BM | |
| Athlete | Event | Opposition Result | Opposition Result | Opposition Result | Opposition Result | Opposition Result | Opposition Result | Opposition Result | Rank |
|---|---|---|---|---|---|---|---|---|---|
| Adnan Rhimi | −84 kg | Bye | Yenokyan (ARM); L 1–3 ^{PP} | Did not advance | | | | | 18 |

Men's Greco-Roman

| Athlete | Event | Qualification | Round of 16 | Quarterfinal | Semifinal | Repechage 1 | Repechage 2 | Final / BM | |
| Athlete | Event | Opposition Result | Opposition Result | Opposition Result | Opposition Result | Opposition Result | Opposition Result | Opposition Result | Rank |
|---|---|---|---|---|---|---|---|---|---|
| Haykel Achouri | −84 kg | Bye | Gadabadze (AZE); L 0–3 ^{PO} | Did not advance | | | | | 20 |

Women's freestyle

| Athlete | Event | Round of 16 | Quarterfinal | Semifinal | Repechage 1 | Repechage 2 | Final / BM | |
| Athlete | Event | Opposition Result | Opposition Result | Opposition Result | Opposition Result | Opposition Result | Opposition Result | Rank |
|---|---|---|---|---|---|---|---|---|
| Marwa Amri | −55 kg | Rentería (COL); L 1–3 ^{PP} | Did not advance | | | | | 14 |

== See also ==
- Tunisia at the 2008 Summer Paralympics
