= Morocco at the 2008 Summer Olympics =

- IOC code: MAR
- NOC: Moroccan Olympic Committee
- Website: www.cnom.org.ma (in French)

in Beijing
- Competitors: 47 in 7 sports
- Flag bearer: Abdelkader Kada (coach)
- Medals Ranked 64th: Gold 0 Silver 1 Bronze 1 Total 2

Summer Olympics appearances (overview)
- 1960; 1964; 1968; 1972; 1976; 1980; 1984; 1988; 1992; 1996; 2000; 2004; 2008; 2012; 2016; 2020; 2024

Morocco competed in the 2008 Summer Olympics held in Beijing, China, from August 8 to August 24, 2008.

== Medalists ==
Medal	Name	Sport	Event
Silver	Jaouad Gharib	Athletics	Men's Marathon
Bronze	Hasna Benhassi	Athletics	Women's 800m

== Archery ==
Morocco sent an archer to the Olympics for the first time. Fatine Ouadoudi took the top spot at the 2008 African qualifying tournament, earning the nation its first Olympic archery spot.

Athlete	Event	Ranking round		Round of 64	Round of 32	Round of 16	Quarterfinals	Semifinals	Final / BM	
Athlete	Event	Score	Seed	Opposition Score	Opposition Score	Opposition Score	Opposition Score	Opposition Score	Opposition Score	Rank
Khadija Abbouda	Women's individual	539	64	Park S-H (KOR) (1); L 80–112	Did not advance					

== Athletics ==
Key

- Note–Ranks given for track events are within the athlete's heat only
- Q = Qualified for the next round
- q = Qualified for the next round as a fastest loser or, in field events, by position without achieving the qualifying target
- NR = National record
- N/A = Round not applicable for the event
- Bye = Athlete not required to compete in round

Men
Track & road events

Athlete	Event	Heat		Semifinal		Final	
Athlete	Event	Result	Rank	Result	Rank	Result	Rank
Youssef Baba	1500 m	3:42.13	10	Did not advance			
Yassine Bensghir	800 m	1:46.88	7	Did not advance			
Abderrahime Bouramdane	Marathon	—N/a				2:17:42	26
Mouhssin Chehibi	800 m	1:46.75	5	Did not advance			
Mohamed El Hachimi	10000 m	—N/a				DNF	
Abdelaziz El Idrissi	5000 m	14:05.30	11	—N/a		Did not advance	
Hamid Ezzine	3000 m steeplechase	8:27.45	6	—N/a		Did not advance	
Abdellah Falil	10000 m	—N/a				27:53.14	16
Jaouad Gharib	Marathon	—N/a				2:07:16	2nd place, silver medalist(s)
Abderrahim Goumri	Marathon	—N/a				2:15:00	20
Abdelkader Hachlaf	3000 m steeplechase	8:23.62	3 Q	—N/a		9:02.06	15
Abdalaati Iguider	1500 m	3:36.48	4 Q	3:37.21	2 Q	3:34.66	5
Amine Laâlou	800 m	1:47.86	1 Q	1:46.74	4	Did not advance	
Mourad Marofit	5000 m	14:00.76	8	—N/a		Did not advance	
Mohamed Moustaoui	1500 m	3:34.80	1 Q	3:40.90	9	Did not advance	
Anis Selmouni	5000 m	13:43.70	8	—N/a		Did not advance	
Brahim Taleb	3000 m steeplechase	8:23.09	9	—N/a		Did not advance	

Field events

Athlete	Event	Qualification		Final	
Athlete	Event	Distance	Position	Distance	Position
Yahya Berrabah	Long jump	7.88	17	Did not advance	
Tarik Bougtaïb	Long jump	7.69	29	Did not advance	
Tarik Bougtaïb	Triple jump	NM	—	Did not advance	

Women
Track & road events

Athlete	Event	Heat		Semifinal		Final	
Athlete	Event	Result	Rank	Result	Rank	Result	Rank
Hasna Benhassi	800 m	2:00.51	2 Q	1:58.03	2 Q	1:56.73	3rd place, bronze medalist(s)
Bouchra Chaâbi	1500 m	4:19.89	11	—N/a		Did not advance	
Siham Hilali	1500 m	4:05.36	3 Q	—N/a		4:05.57	10
Btissam Lakhouad	1500 m	4:14.34	3 Q	—N/a		4:07.25	12
Asmae Leghzaoui	10000 m	—N/a				DNF	
Hanane Ouhaddou	3000 m steeplechase	9:56.41	11	—N/a		Did not advance	
Mariem Alaoui Selsouli	5000 m	15:21.47	11	—N/a		Did not advance	

== Boxing ==
Morocco qualified ten boxers for the Olympic boxing tournament, missing only the light heavyweight class. Rachidi was the only to qualify at the World Championships. Seven more qualified at the first African qualifying tournament. Bouchtouk and Amanissi qualified at the second continental event.

Athlete	Event	Round of 32	Round of 16	Quarterfinals	Semifinals	Final	
Athlete	Event	Opposition Result	Opposition Result	Opposition Result	Opposition Result	Opposition Result	Rank
Redouane Bouchtouk	Light flyweight	Carvalho (BRA); L 7–13	Did not advance				
Abdelillah Nhaila	Flyweight	Mammadov (AZE); L 4–19	Did not advance				
Hicham Mesbahi	Bantamweight	Romero (COL); W 11–3	Ikgopoleng (BOT); L RSC	Did not advance			
Mahdi Ouatine	Featherweight	Enkhzorig (MGL); L 1–10	Did not advance				
Tahar Tamsamani	Lightweight	Valentino (ITA); L 4–15	Did not advance				
Driss Moussaid	Light welterweight	Kidd (AUS); W 23–2	Iglesias (CUB); L 4–15	Did not advance			
Mehdi Khalsi	Welterweight	Mahmudov (UZB); L 3–11	Did not advance				
Said Rachidi	Middleweight	Artayev (KAZ); L 2–8	Did not advance				
Mohamed Arjaoui	Heavyweight	—N/a	Pitt (AUS); W 11–6	Wilder (USA); L 10–10^{+}	Did not advance		
Mohamed Amanissi	Super heavyweight	—N/a	Zhang Zl (CHN); L 0–15	Did not advance			

== Fencing ==
Men

Athlete	Event	Round of 64	Round of 32	Round of 16	Quarterfinal	Semifinal	Final / BM	
Athlete	Event	Opposition Score	Opposition Score	Opposition Score	Opposition Score	Opposition Score	Opposition Score	Rank
Aissam Rami	Individual épée	Motyka (POL); L 11–15	Did not advance					
Lahoussine Ali	Individual foil	—N/a	Guyart (FRA); L 3–15	Did not advance				

== Judo ==
Men

Athlete	Event	Preliminary	Round of 32	Round of 16	Quarterfinals	Semifinals	Repechage 1	Repechage 2	Repechage 3	Final / BM	
Athlete	Event	Opposition Result	Opposition Result	Opposition Result	Opposition Result	Opposition Result	Opposition Result	Opposition Result	Opposition Result	Opposition Result	Rank
Younes Ahamdi	−60 kg	Bye	Paischer (AUT); L 0000–1010	Did not advance			Fallon (GBR); L 0000–0011	Did not advance			
Rachid Rguig	−66 kg	Bye	Darbelet (FRA); L 0000–1002	Did not advance			Mehmedovic (CAN); L 0000–0201	Did not advance			
Safouane Attaf	−81 kg	Bye	Bashkaev (RUS); W 1000–0001	Burton (GBR); L 0001–0010	Did not advance						
Mohamed El Assri	−90 kg	—N/a	Benikhlef (ALG); L 0001–0011	Did not advance			Alarza (ESP); W 0000–0000 YUS	Aschwanden (SUI); L 0000–0001	Did not advance		

== Swimming ==
Women

Athlete	Event	Heat		Semifinal		Final	
Athlete	Event	Time	Rank	Time	Rank	Time	Rank
Sara El Bekri	100 m breaststroke	1:08.66	19	Did not advance			
Sara El Bekri	200 m breaststroke	2:30.09	28	Did not advance			

== Taekwondo ==
Athlete	Event	Round of 16	Quarterfinals	Semifinals	Repechage	Bronze Medal	Final	
Athlete	Event	Opposition Result	Opposition Result	Opposition Result	Opposition Result	Opposition Result	Opposition Result	Rank
Abdelkader Zrouri	Men's +80 kg	Díaz (VEN); W KO	Nikolaidis (GRE); L 4–5	Did not advance	Chilmanov (KAZ); L WO	Did not advance		
Ghizlane Toudali	Women's −49 kg	Khoshjamal (IRI); L 0–5	Did not advance					
Mouna Benabderrassoul	Women's −67 kg	Okamoto (JPN); W 2–0	Épangue (FRA); L 1–1 SUP	Did not advance				

== See also ==
- Morocco at the 2008 Summer Paralympics
