= Abdelhalim Ouradi =

Algerian boxer (born 1981)

Medal record

Representing Algeria

Men's Boxing

All-Africa Games
Gold medal – first place	2007 Algiers	Bantamweight

Abdelhalim Ourradi (born March 19, 1981) is an Algerian boxer. He won the 2007 All-African title in the bantamweight division and qualified for the 2008 Summer Olympics for his native North African country.

== Career ==
At the African Championships in 2005, Ouradi lost the semifinal in the flyweight division to Tunisia's Walid Cherif. He then moved up to bantamweight, where he lost to Bruno Julie of Mauritius at the African Championships in May 2007.

At the 2007 All-Africa Games in Algeria, he defeated Julie in the semifinals and Ghanaian Issa Samir in the final.

Ouradi won the gold medal in the 51 kg division at the African Olympic Qualifying Tournament in Algiers, Algeria, where he beat Morocca's Mesbahi Hicham 6:0 in the final. He later won the Ahmet Comert Cup tournament.

At the Olympics, Ouradi was defeated by Irish boxer John Joe Nevin 4:9.

In 2009, Ouradi upset local hero Bruno Julie in a rematch and won the African Championships in Mauritius.
