= Steve Sutherland =

Steve Sutherland may refer to:

- Steve Sutherland (ice hockey) (born 1946), hockey player
- Steve Sutherland (DJ) (died 2020), British DJ
- Stephen Sutherland (born 1990), Australian boxer
