= Boxing at the 2007 All-Africa Games =

Boxing competitions

The Boxing Tournament at the 2007 All-Africa Games was held in Algiers, Algeria from July 11 to July 23. It served as a qualification tournament for the 2008 Summer Olympics in Beijing, PR China. The number one and two earned a ticket for the Olympic tournament.

== Medal winners ==
Event	Gold	Silver	Bronze
Light Flyweight (– 48 kilograms)	Suleiman Bilali (KEN)	Manyo Plange (GHA)	Thomas Essomba (CMR); Junior Mikamou (GAB)
Flyweight (– 51 kilograms)	Abderahim Mechenouai (ALG)	Jackson Chauke (RSA)	Johannes Simon (NAM); Kennedy Kanyanta (ZAM)
Bantamweight (– 54 kilograms)	Abdelhalim Ouradi (ALG)	Issah Samir (GHA)	Bruno Julie (MRI); Khumiso Ikgopoleng (BOT)
Featherweight (– 57 kilograms)	Abdelkader Chadi (ALG)	Alaa Shili (TUN)	Roberto Adjaho (BEN); Ibrahima Keita (GUI)
Lightweight (– 60 kilograms)	Seifeddine Nejmaoui (TUN)	Yassin Al-Sheairy (EGY)	Owethu Mbira (RSA); Muideen Ganiyu (NGA)
Light Welterweight (– 64 kilograms)	Hastings Bwalya (ZAM)	Herbert Nkabiti (BOT)	Abderrahmane Araby (EGY); Rachid Tariket (ALG)
Welterweight (– 69 kilograms)	Rached Merdassi (TUN)	Bastir Samir (GHA)	Foster Nkodo (CMR); Hossam Bakr Abdin (EGY)
Middleweight (– 75 kilograms)	Nabil Kassel (ALG)	Ahmed Saraku (GHA)	Jean-Babtiste Bekondji (CMR); Daniel Shishia (KEN)
Light Heavyweight (– 81 kilograms)	Ramadan Yasser (EGY)	Abdelhafid Benchabla (ALG)	Adura Olalehin (NGA); Joshua Ndere (KEN)
Heavyweight (– 91 kilograms)	Mourad Sahraoui (TUN)	Lateef Kayode (NGA)	Abdelaziz Touilbini (ALG); Ousmane Diatta (SEN)
Super Heavyweight (+ 91 kilograms)	Emad Abdelhalim Ali (EGY)	Newfel Ouatah (ALG)	Mohamed Homrani (TUN); Remy Atsama (CMR)

== Medals table ==
Rank	Nation	Gold	Silver	Bronze	Total
1	Algeria	4	2	2	8
2	Tunisia	3	1	1	5
3	Egypt	2	1	2	5
4	Kenya	1	0	3	4
5	Zambia	1	0	1	2
6	Ghana	0	4	0	4
7	Nigeria	0	1	2	3
8	Botswana	0	1	1	2
8	South Africa	0	1	1	2
10	Cameroon	0	0	4	4
11	Benin	0	0	1	1
11	Gabon	0	0	1	1
11	Guinea	0	0	1	1
11	Mauritius	0	0	1	1
11	Namibia	0	0	1	1
11	Senegal	0	0	1	1
