= 1st AIBA European 2008 Olympic Qualifying Tournament =

Boxing competitions

- Venues: 1
- Location: Italy
- Dates: February 25 – March 1
- Teams: 21
- Website: tournament website

1st AIBA European Olympic Boxing Qualifying Tournament was held from February 25 – March 1, 2008 in Roseto degli Abruzzi-Pescara, Italy. During the tournament 250 boxers from 40 countries competed for 26 Olympic qualifying places in 11 different weight categories.

== Qualifying ==
40 teams participated in this tournament:

- Albania (9)
- Armenia (7)
- Austria (3)
- Azerbaijan (10)
- Belgium (1)
- Bosnia and Herzegovina (2)
- Belarus (11)
- Bulgaria (10)
- Croatia (5)
- Cyprus (3)
- Czech Republic (6)
- Spain (11)
- Estonia (1)
- Finland (5)
- France (8)
- Great Britain (0) (ENG - 7), (SCO - 4), (WAL - 2)
- Georgia (8)
- Germany (8)
- Greece (8)
- Hungary (10)
- Ireland (10)
- Israel (5)
- Italy (7)
- Latvia (9)
- Lithuania (9)
- Moldova (7)
- Macedonia (3)
- Montenegro (3)
- Netherlands (2)
- Norway (1)
- Poland (9)
- Romania (9)
- Russia (2)
- Serbia (7)
- Slovakia (4)
- Slovenia (6)
- Sweden (3)
- Turkey (8)
- Ukraine (7)

Number in ( ) is total boxer in each country

== Competition System ==
The competition system of the 1st AIBA European Olympic Boxing Qualifying Tournament is the knockout round system. Each boxer fights one match per round.

== Medal summary ==
Event	Gold	Silver	Bronze
Light flyweight	(Russia) David Ayrapetyan	(Poland) Łukasz Maszczyk	(Turkey) Ferhat Pehlivan (Belarus) Anton Bekish
Flyweight	(Hungary) Norbert Kalucza	(England) Khalid Saeed Yafai	(Germany) Marcel Schneider (Moldova) Igor Samoilenco
Bantamweight	(Republic of Ireland) John Joe Nevin	(Moldova) Vyacheslav Goyan	(Germany) Rustamhodza Rahimov
Featherweight	(France) Khedafi Djelkhir	(Azerbaijan) Shahin Imranov	(Germany) Wilhelm Gratschow
Lightweight	(Ukraine) Olexandr Klyuchko	(Hungary) Miklos Varga	(Azerbaijan) Ramal Amanov (Romania) Georgian Popescu
Light Welterweight	(Hungary) Gyula Káté	(Romania) Ionut Gheorghe	(Republic of Ireland) John Joe Joyce (Lithuania) Egidijus Kavaliauskas
Welterweight	(Belarus) Magomed Nurutdinov	(Ukraine) Olexandr Stretskiy	(England) Billy Joe Saunders
Middleweight	(Sweden) Naim Terbunja	(England) James Degale	(Armenia) Andranik Hakobyan
Light Heavyweight	(Ukraine) Ismail Syllakh	(Belarus) Ramazan Magomedov	(Republic of Ireland) Kenneth Egan (Turkey) Bahram Muzaffer
Heavyweight	(Belarus) Viktor Zuyev	(Ukraine) Oleksandr Usyk	(Poland) Artur Szpilka (England) Daniel Price
Super Heavyweight	(Bulgaria) Kubrat Pulev	(Croatia) Marko Tomasović	(Lithuania) Jaroslav Jaksto (Finland) Robert Helenius

== Medal table ==
Rank	Nation	Gold	Silver	Bronze	Total
1	Ukraine	2	2	0	4
2	Belarus	2	1	1	4
3	Hungary	2	1	0	3
4	Ireland	1	0	2	3
5	Bulgaria	1	0	0	1
5	France	1	0	0	1
5	Russia	1	0	0	1
5	Sweden	1	0	0	1
9	Great Britain	0	2	2	4
10	Azerbaijan	0	1	1	2
10	Moldova	0	1	1	2
10	Poland	0	1	1	2
10	Romania	0	1	1	2
14	Croatia	0	1	0	1
15	Germany	0	0	3	3
16	Lithuania	0	0	2	2
16	Turkey	0	0	2	2
18	Armenia	0	0	1	1
18	Finland	0	0	1	1
Totals (19 entries)		11	11	18	40

== Key to AIBA decisions ==
KO	DSQ	BDSQ	JURY	RSC	RSCH	RSCI	RSCOS	NC	WO	RET	R
Knockout	Disqualified	Both disqualified	Result determined by jury votes	Referee stop contest	Referee stop contest by head blow	Referee stop contest by injured	Referee stop contest outscored	No contest	Walkover	Retired	Round

== See also ==
- 1st AIBA African 2008 Olympic Qualifying Tournament
