= Tobias Munihango =

Namibian boxer (born 1983)

Tobias Mabuta Munihango (born 1983) is a Namibian amateur boxer.

Munihango finished in third place at the 1st AIBA African 2008 Olympic Qualifying Tournament held in January 2008 in Algeria but did not qualify for Boxing at the 2008 Summer Olympics on a technicality. He competed in the 2nd round of African qualification for the 2008 games, which was held in Windhoek in March 2008, but did not qualify.
