= Boxing at the 2010 South American Games – Men's 69kg =

The Men's 69 kg event at the 2010 South American Games had its quarterfinals held on March 22, the semifinals on March 24 and the final on March 27.

== Medalists ==
| Gold | Silver | Bronze |
|---|---|---|
| Brian Castaño; Argentina | Leonard Carrillo; Colombia | Esquiva Florentino; Brazil; Jonny Sanchez; Venezuela |

== Results ==
Quarterfinals
Luis Mancilla (BOL)
Jonny Sanchez (VEN) | RSC
Esquiva Florentino (BRA) | RSC
Gabriel Castillo (PAN)
Brian Castaño (ARG) | 12
Marco Quiroz Orellana (ECU) | 1

Semifinals
Leonard Carrillo (COL) | 11
Jonny Sanchez (VEN) | 5
Esquiva Florentino (BRA) | 6
Brian Castaño (ARG) | 9

Final
Leonard Carrillo (COL) | 1
Brian Castaño (ARG) | 7
