= Abderahim Mechenouai =

Algerian boxer

Medal record

Representing Algeria

Men's Boxing

All-Africa Games
Gold medal – first place	2007 Algiers	Flyweight

Abderahim Mechenouai is an Algerian boxer best known for winning the All-Africa title 2007 as a flyweight boxer.

== Career ==
At the All-Africa Games he won the final against South African Jackson Chauke.

He failed to qualify for the Olympics as he lost his match to Abdelillah Nhaila.
