= Aziz Ali =

Kenyan boxer

Personal information
- Full name: Aziz Ali
- Nationality: Kenya
- Born: September 15, 1980 (age 45)
- Height: 1.73 m (5 ft 8 in)
- Weight: 81 kg (179 lb)

Sport
- Sport: Boxing
- Weight class: Light-Heavyweight
- Club: Kenyan Prison Service

Aziz Ali (born September 15, 1980) is a Kenyan amateur boxer who qualified for the 2008 Olympics at light-heavyweight at the 2nd AIBA African 2008 Olympic Qualifying Tournament despite being knocked out by Bastie Samir in the last fight. At the Olympics, he lost his first bout 3:8 to Turkey's Bahram Muzaffer.
