= Mhlongo =

Mhlongo is a South African surname. It may refer to:

- Benson Mhlongo (born 1980), South African football (soccer) player
- Brighton Mhlongo (born 1991), South African football (soccer) player
- Busi Mhlongo (1947–2010), South African virtuoso singer, dancer and composer
- Joseph Mhlongo (born 1990), South African football midfielder
- Mpumelelo Mhlongo (born 1994), South African sprint and long jump athlete
- Ndaba Mhlongo (1933–1989), South African actor and choreographer
- Niq Mhlongo (born 1973), South African journalist and novelist
- Nombulelo Mhlongo (born 1992), South African actress, classical singer, teacher, and writer
- Nqobile Mhlongo, South African politician
- Somizi Mhlongo (born 1972), South African media personality, television presenter, actor, choreographer and socialite
- Tsepo Mhlongo, South African politician
