= Rached Merdassi =

Tunisian boxer

Medal record
Men's Boxing
Representing Tunisia
All-Africa Games
Gold medal – first place	2007 Algiers	Welterweight

Rached Merdassi (Arabic: رشيد المرداسي) is a Tunisian boxer who has won the Africa Games 2007 at welterweight

== Career ==
At the AllAfrica Games he beat Ghanaian puncher Bastir Samir in the final.

At the Olympic qualification he was disqualified against Joseph Mulema from Cameroon.
