= Abdelhafid Benchabla =

Algerian boxer (born 1986)

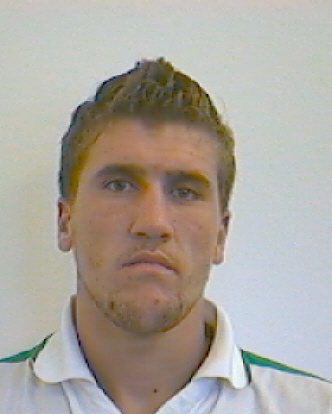

Personal information
- Nationality: Algeria
- Born: 26 September 1986 (age 39) Zemmouri, Algeria
- Height: 1.84 m (6 ft 0 in)
- Weight: 81 kg (179 lb)

Sport
- Sport: Boxing
- Weight class: Light Heavyweight
- Club: (Kazakhstan) Astana Arlans
Medal record
Men's amateur boxing
Representing Algeria
African Championships
Gold medal – first place	2015 Casablanca	Light heavyweight
All-Africa Games
Gold medal – first place	2011 Maputo	Light Heavyweight
Gold medal – first place	2015 Brazzaville	Light Heavyweight
Gold medal – first place	2019 Rabat	Heavyweight
Silver medal – second place	2007 Algiers	Light Heavyweight
Mediterranean Games
Gold medal – first place	2013 Mersin	Light Heavyweight
Silver medal – second place	2009 Pescara	Light Heavyweight

Abdelhafid Benchabla (Kabyle: Ɛebdelḥafid Bencabla, Arabic: عبد الحفيظ بن شبلة; born 26 September 1986, in Zemmouri) is an Algerian amateur boxer. He represented Algeria at the 2008 and 2012 Summer Olympics and is the current World Series of Boxing Light heavyweight champion.

== Career ==
At the Arab Championships 2007, he lost the semifinal to Tunisian boxer Mourad Sahraoui. At the 2007 All-Africa Games in Algiers, Benchabla won the silver medal after losing in the final to Ramadan Yasser of Egypt.

In 2008, Benchabla qualified for the 2008 Summer Olympics in Beijing after beating Bastir Samir of Ghana at the AIBA African Olympic Boxing Qualifying Tournament 2008 in Algiers, Algeria. he beat Mourad Sahraoui of Tunisia in the final. At the Olympics he won the rematch with Kassel but lost 7:12 to eventual winner Zhang Xiaoping.

In 2009, Benchabla won silver medal at the 2009 Mediterranean Games in Pescara, Italy, after losing in the light heavyweight final to Bosko Draskovic of Montenegro.

On 28 May 2011, Benchabla qualified for the 2012 Summer Olympics in London after beating Ludovic Groguhe of France in the World Series of Boxing light heavyweight final in Guiyang, China.

At the 2012 Olympics (results) he beat German Enrico Kölling 12-9 then lost to Ukrainian Oleksandr Hvozdyk 17–19, with a controversial two points penalty in the last 5 seconds of the 3rd round.

== Chronology ==
- 2015 – All Africa Games (Brazzaville, CGO) 1st place – 81 kg Won against Abderrahmane Salah Araby (EGY) 2:1 in the final; Won against Kennedy Katende (UGA) 3:0 in the semi-final; Won against Bambo Botumbe (DRC) TKO 1st round in the quarter-final
- 2015 – AFBC African Confederation Boxing Championships (Casablanca, MAR) 1st place – 81 kg Won against Abderrahmane Salah Araby (EGY) 3:0 in the final; Won against Hassan Saada (MAR) 3:0 in the semi-final; Won against Mohammed Ali (GHA) TKO 1st round in the quarter-final
- 2015 – AIBA Pro Boxing Cycle I Round 2 (Hamburg, GER) – 81 kg Won against Abdelhafid Benchabla (ALG) 3:0
- 2015 – AIBA Pro Boxing Cycle I Round 1 (Rome, ITA) – 81 kg Lost to Nikita Ivanov (RUS) 2:1
- 2014 – World Series of Boxing Season 2013/2014 Quarter-finals 2nd Leg – 81 kg Won against Teymur Mammadov (AZE) 3:0
- 2014 – World Series of Boxing Season 2013/2014 9th Round – 81 kg Won against Oleksandr Ganzulya (UKR) 3:0
- 2014 – World Series of Boxing Season 2013/2014 5th Round – 81 kg Won against Michel Borges (BRA) 3:0
- 2013 – AIBA World Championships (Almaty, KAZ) 5th place – 81 kg Lost to Julio Cesar De La Cruz (CUB) 3:0 in the quarter-final; Won against Alaaldin Ghossoun (SYR) 3:0 in the second preliminary round; Won against Bosko Draskovic (MNE) 3:0 in the first preliminary round
- 2013 – Mediterranean Games (Mersin, TUR) 1st place – 81 kg Won against Abdelkader Bouhenia (FRA) 3:0 in the final; Won against Avni Yildirim (TUR) 3:0 in the semi-final; Won against Gianluca Rosciglione (ITA) 3:0 in the quarter-final; Won against Yahya Mkacheri (TUN) 3:0 in the first preliminary round
- 2013 – Giraldo Cordova Cardin Memorial Tournament (Havana, CUB) 9th place – 81 kg Lost to Julio Cesar De La Cruz (CUB) 3:0 in the first preliminary round
- 2013 – World Series of Boxing Season 2012/2013 Semi-finals 2nd Leg – 85 kg Lost to Oleksandr Gvozdyk (UKR) by points
- 2013 – World Series of Boxing Season 2012/2013 Quarter-finals 1st Leg – 85 kg Won against Mateusz Tryc (POL) by points
- 2013 – World Series of Boxing Season 2012/2013 9th Round – 85 kg Won against Ainar Karlson (EST) by points
- 2013 – World Series of Boxing Season 2012/2013 7th Round – 85 kg Won against Joseph Ward (IRL) by points
- 2012 – World Series of Boxing Season 2012/2013 4th Round – 85 kg Won against Ramezjon Ahmedov (UZB) by points
- 2012 – World Series of Boxing Season 2012/2013 1st Round – 85 kg Lost to Sergej Michel (GER) by points
- 2012 – London 2012 Olympic Games (London, GBR) 7th place – 81 kg Lost to Oleksandr Gvozdyk (UKR) 19:17 in the quarter-final; Won against Enrico Koelling (GER) 12:9 in the first preliminary round
- 2012 – World Series of Boxing Season 2011/2012 Quarter-finals 2nd Round – 85 kg Won against Francisco Ortega (MEX) by points
- 2012 – World Series of Boxing Season 2011/2012 10th Round – 85 kg Won against Rahul Kumar (IND) TKO 5th round
- 2012 – World Series of Boxing Season 2011/2012 8th Round – 85 kg Won against Ludovic Groguhe (FRA) by points
- 2011 – World Series of Boxing Season 2011/2012 5th Round – 85 kg Won against Leonid Charnabayev (BLR) by points
- 2011 – World Series of Boxing Season 2011/2012 3rd Round – 85 kg Lost to Ludovic Groguhe (FRA) TKO 2nd round
- 2011 – All Africa Games (Maputo, MOZ) 1st place – 81 kg Won against Lukmon Lawal (NGR) 18:8 in the final; Won against Christian Domfack Adjoufack (CMR) 15:4 in the semi-final; Won against Norberto Castro (ANG) RSCI 1st round in the quarter-final; Won against Yahya Mkacheri (TUN) 14:7 in the first preliminary round
- 2011 – ITA-ALG Dual Match2 – 81 kg Won against Gianluca Rosciglione (ITA) by points
- 2011 – World Series of Boxing Individual Finals (Guiyang, CHN) 1st place – 85 kg Won against Ludovic Groguhe (FRA) by points in the final
- 2011 – World Series of Boxing 11th Round – 85 kg Won against Assane Faye (SEN) by points
- 2011 – World Series of Boxing 7th Round – 85 kg Won against Ramezjon Ahmedov (UZB) by points
- 2011 – World Series of Boxing 5th Round – 85 kg Won against Zhang Wei (CHN) by points
- 2010 – World Series of Boxing 4th Round – 85 kg Won against Denis Poyatsika (UKR) by points
- 2010 – World Series of Boxing 2nd Round – 85 kg Won against Zhang Wei (CHN) TKO 3rd round
- 2010 – Mohamed VI Trophy (Marrakech, MAR) 1st place – 81 kg Won against Amine El-Mohammady El-Alfy (EGY) by points in the final; Won against Ludovic Groguhe (FRA) 3:1 in the semi-final; Won against Yahya Mkacheri (TUN) 4:2 in the quarter-final
- 2009 – AIBA President's Cup (Baku, AZE) 7th place – 81 kg Lost to Rizvan Alimuradov (RUS) 12:8 in the quarter-final
- 2009 – Tammer Tournament (Tampere, FIN) 1st place – 81 kg Won against Denis Tsaryuk (RUS) 14:4 in the final; Won against Eemeli Katajisto (FIN) 7:3 in the semi-final; Won against Kennedy Katende (SWE) 10:8 in the quarter-final
- 2009 – AIBA World Championships (Milan, ITA) participant – 81 kg Lost to Carlos Gongora (ECU) 13:10 in the second preliminary round; Won against Vladimir Cheles (MDA) 20:11 in the first preliminary round
- 2009 – AFBC African Continental Championships (Vacoas, MRI) 1st place – 81 kg Won against Charles Ovono Obiang (GAB) RSC 2nd round in the final; Won against Ahmed Saraku (GHA) 8:4 in the semifinal; Won against Rodney Prosper (MRI) 22:3 in the quarterfinal
- 2009 – Mediterranean Games (Pescara, ITA) 2nd place – 81 kg Lost to Bosko Draskovic (MNE) 8:4 in the final; Won against Yahya El-Mekachari (TUN) 9:0 in the semifinal; Won against Munaf Assad (SYR) RSC 2nd round in the quarterfinal
- 2009 – Ahmet Cömert Tournament (Istanbul, TUR) 3rd place – 81 kg Lost to Artur Beterbiyev (RUS) 8:4 in the semifinal; Won against Yildirim Tarhan (TUR) RSC 2nd round quarterfinal; Won against Jose Angel Larduet (CUB) 8:3 in the first round
- 2009 – Algerian National Championships 1st place – 81 kg Won against Samir Masoui (ALG) by points in the final
- 2009 – Arab Championships (Cairo, EGY) 1st place – 81 kg Won against Amine Elmohamady Elalfy (EGY) RSC 3rd round in the final; Won against Ahmed Merzouk (KSA) RSC 1st round in the semifinal; Won against Ahmed Suleiman Al-Teimat (JOR) by points in the quarterfinal
- 2009 – Chemistry Cup (Halle, GER) 2nd place – 81 kg Lost to Robert Woge (GER) 11:3 in the final; Won against Jasveer Singh (IND) 8:4 in the semifinal
- 2008 – AIBA World Cup (Moscow, RUS) 7th place – 81 kg Lost to Dinesh Kumar (IND) 17:11 in the quarterfinal
- 2008 – Beijing 2008 Olympic Games (Beijing, CHN) 5th place – 81 kg Lost to Zhang Xiaoping (CHN) 12:7 in the quarterfinal; Won against Ramadan Abdelghafar Anwar Yasser (EGY) 13:6 in the second round; Won against Dinesh Kumar (IND) RSCO 3rd round in the first preliminary round
- 2008 – Ahmet Cömert Tournament (Istanbul, TUR) 3rd place – 81 kg Lost to Mehdi Ghorbani (IRN) by points in the semifinal; Won against Asim Iskanderov (AZE) by points in the quarterfinal
- 2008 – Coupe des Nations (Calais, FRA) 1st place – 81 kg Won against Yerkebulan Shinaliyev (KAZ) 24:21 in the final; Won against Rene Krause (GER) 20:14 in the semifinal
- 2008 – Gee Bee Tournament (Helsinki, FIN) 6th place – 81 kg Lost to Imre Szello (HUN) 17:12
- 2008 – Feliks Stamm Tournament (Warsaw, POL) 3rd place – 81 kg Lost to Artur Beterbiyev (RUS) RSC 4th round
- 2008 – 1st Africa Olympic Qualification Tournament (Alger, ALG) 1st place – 81 kg Won against Mourad Sahraoui (TUN) WO in the final; Won against Bastie Samir (GHA) 27:8 in the semifinal
- 2007 – Pan Arab Games (Cairo, EGY) 6th place – 75 kg Lost to Said Rachidi (MAR) 18:12
- 2007 – World Military Games (Hyderabad, IND) 3rd place – 81 kg Lost to Sergey Kovalyov (RUS) 29:8
- 2007 – All Africa Games (Alger, ALG) 2nd place – 81 kg Lost to Ramadan Abdelghafar Anwar Yasser (EGY) 18:15 in the final
- 2007 – Klichko Brothers Tournament (Kyiv, UKR) 7th place – 81 kg Lost to Hazzam Nabah (QAT) 8:7 in the quarter-final
- 2007 – Arab Military Championships (Alger, ALG) 1st place – 81 kg
- 2007 – Arab Championships (Aryanah, TUN) 3rd place – 81 kg Lost to Mourad Sahraoui (TUN) by points in the semi-final
- 2007 – Algerian National Championships 1st place – 81 kg
- 2004 – Algerian Junior National Championships 1st place – 57 kg

Olympic Games
Preceded by Mehdi-Selim Khelifi	Flagbearer for Algeria; London 2012	Succeeded by Sonia Asselah
