= Emad Abdelhalim Ali =

Egyptian boxer

Medal record
Representing Egypt
Men's Boxing
All-Africa Games
Gold medal – first place	2007 Algiers	Super Heavyweight

Emad Abdelhalim Ali is an amateur boxer from Egypt.

== Career ==
Ali is best known for having won the gold medal in the men's super heavyweight division at the 2007 All-Africa Games.

In 2006, still competing at 201 lbs, he lost in the first round of the Ahmed Öner Cup to Ali Mazaheri by RSCO. He beat Guy Bakutu Batangule (ZAI) 17-4, Mohamed Homrani (TUN) 17-11 and in the final local hero Newfel Ouatah (ALG) 17-8.
