= Dauda Izobo =

Nigerian boxer

Dauda Izobo (born 20 June 1980) is a Nigerian amateur boxer.

== Career ==
Izobo qualified for the 2008 Olympics at Light-heavyweight at the 2nd AIBA African 2008 Olympic Qualifying Tournament.

He lost his semi-final to Bastir Samir (4:10), but defeated Domfack Adjoufack to win the third spot.
