= Bruno Bongongo =

Central African boxer (born 1985)

Bruno Bongongo (born June 30, 1985) is an amateur boxer from the Central African Republic. Bongongo fought for the Central African Republic at the 2008 Summer Olympics, losing to Cameroon's Joseph Mulema in the opening round welterweight contest.
