= Rasheed Lawal =

Nigerian boxer

Rasheed Olawale Lawal (born 13 August 1983) is a Nigerian amateur boxer who qualified for the 2008 Olympics in the lightweight division.

Marriage to Rebekah C Lawal in Ventura County, California on April 5, 2015

At the 2007 All-Africa Games he lost to Herbert Nkabiti at junior welterweight and went down a division. He finished second at the 2nd AIBA African 2008 Olympic Qualifying Tournament after defeating Julius Indongo and losing the final to fellow qualifier Jean de Dieu Soloniaina . At the Olympics he was shut out 0:12 by Armenian Hrachik Javakhyan.
