= Bernard Ngumba Irungu =

Kenyan boxer

Bernard Irūngū
Personal information
- Full name: Bernard Ngumba Irungu
- Nationality: Kenyan
- Born: 1 February 1976 (age 50)
- Height: 1.60 m (5 ft 3 in)
- Weight: 51 kg (112 lb)

Sport
- Sport: Boxing
- Weight class: Flyweight

Bernard Ngūmba Irūngū (born 1 February 1976) is an amateur boxer from Kenya who competed in the 2008 Olympics at the men's flyweight competition after qualifying at the 2nd AIBA African 2008 Olympic Qualifying Tournament where he finished second behind Cassius Chiyanika. In Beijing, he lost in his first fight to Tulashboy Doniyorov.
