= Herbert Nkabiti =

Botswana boxer (1981–2017)

Personal information
- Nationality: Botswana
- Born: 27 March 1981 Kanye, Botswana
- Died: 29 April 2017 (aged 36) Vosloorus, Botswana
- Height: 1.75 m (5 ft 9 in)

Boxing career

Boxing record
- Total fights: 14
- Wins: 10
- Win by KO: 10
- Losses: 3
- Draws: 1
Medal record
Representing Botswana
Men's Boxing
All-Africa Games
Silver medal – second place	2007 Algiers	Light Welterweight

Herbert Nkabiti (27 March 1981 – 29 April 2017) was a Botswana professional boxer who competed from 2009 to 2017. As an amateur, he won the junior welterweight silver medal at the 2007 All-Africa Games.

== Amateur career ==
At the 2006 Commonwealth Games, Nkabiti lost his second fight to eventual English winner James Russan. At the All-Africa Games, he defeated Rasheed Lawal and Rachid Tariket, but lost the final to Hastings Bwalya. He failed to qualify for the 2008 Olympics, losing his bout in the Olympic qualifier to Hamza Hassini.

== Professional career ==
Between 2009 and 2014, Nkabiti compiled a 12-2-1 record, going unbeaten in his first bouts. On 28 April 2017 Nkabiti received a head injury in a fight with South African boxer Willers Baloyi. After sustaining a big uppercut, Nkabiti complained to his corner he was having trouble breathing. Nkabiti was taken from the ring, sedated, and rushed by ambulance to Sunwood Hospital. A CAT scan revealed Nkabiti had an old hairline fracture in his skull.

Nkabiti was moved to Thelle Mogoerane, a state of the art medical facility in Vosloorus, in an attempt to save his life. He died on 29 April 2017.
