= Onorede Ehwareme =

Nigerian boxer

Onoriode Ehwarieme, also known as Onoriode Ehwarieme or Godzilla (born 25 November 1987) is a professional boxer from Nigeria. He qualified for the 2008 Summer Olympics in the super heavyweight division. He turned pro December 5 of 2010.

At the 2nd AIBA African 2008 Olympic Qualifying Tournament held in Windhoek, Namibia, the first and second-place finisher in his division qualified for the Olympics.

He advanced to the finals with a one-point victory over Morris Okola of Kenya 6-5, thus ensuring qualification - Onoriode ultimately took silver in the competition, losing to fellow-qualifier Mohamed Amanissi.

He lost his Olympic debut 1:11 to Jaroslavas

As a professional, he has 20 wins 2 Losses with 19 coming via knockouts. He is currently managed by Nelson Aiyelabowo of LPMG Global.
