= Owethu Mbira =

South African boxer

Medal record

Men's boxing

Representing South Africa

All-Africa Games
Bronze medal – third place	2007 Algiers	Lightweight

Owethu Mbira (born 6 March 1987) is a South African professional boxer who competed from 2008 to 2011. As an amateur, he won a bronze medal at lightweight at the 2007 All-Africa Games.

== Career ==
At the 2007 All-Africa Games in Algiers, he upset local Hamza Kramou but was defeated by Saifeddine Nejmaoui of Tunisia.

At the World Championships he lost to Georgian Vasil Qazishvili.
