= Abdelkader Chadi =

Algerian boxer (born 1986)

Medal record

Men's amateur boxing

Representing Algeria

African Championships
Gold medal – first place	2015 Casablanca	Light welterweight

All-Africa Games
Gold medal – first place	2007 Algiers	Featherweight
Gold medal – first place	2015 Brazzaville	Light Welterweight

Abdelkader Chadi (born 12 December 1986) is an Algerian boxer who won the All-African title 2007 at featherweight and 2015 at junior welter. He also qualified for the 2008, 2012 and 2016 Summer Olympics.

== Career ==
Chadi beat Roberto Adjaho in the semis and Alaa Shili in the final of the Featherweight competition at the 2007 All-Africa Games. In 2008 he qualified for the Beijing Olympics by beating Shili again. He skipped the final against Mahdi Ouatine. He had weight problems and competed at lightweight in the months before the Olympics.

At the 2008 Summer Olympics, he beat Sailom Adi in the last 16, before losing to Yakup Kılıç in the last 8.

At the 2012 Summer Olympics he competed at lightweight, losing to Fatih Keleş in the first round.

In the 2016 Summer Olympics he lost to Joedison Teixeira of Brazil in the first round of the light welterweight competition.
