= Thato Batshegi =

Botswana boxer (born 1988)

Personal information
- Nationality: Botswana
- Born: April 27, 1988 (age 38)
- Height: 1.76 m (5 ft 9 in)
- Weight: 57 kg (126 lb)

Sport
- Sport: Boxing
- Weight class: Featherweight
- Club: Dinotshi Boxing Club

Thato Batshegi (born 27 April 1988) is an Olympic boxer from Botswana. Batshegi competed at the 2nd AIBA African 2008 Olympic Qualifying Tournament and the 2006 Commonwealth Games. At the 2008 Olympic qualifying tournament, Batshegi lost to Kenyan Nick Okoth in the gold medal match, but still qualified for the 2008 Summer Olympics. At the Olympics 2008, he was defeated 4:14 by Georgia's Nikoloz Izoria.
