= Immanuel Naidjala =

Namibian boxer (born 1984)

Immanuel "Prince" Naidjala (born November 9, 1984) is a Namibian professional boxer who fights in the Bantamweight division. As a professional, he made his debut on October 31, 2009, when knocked out Daniel Ausik in the third round. In his 11th fight, he knocked out Emmanuel Simbeye earning a WBO Africa belt. His next fight, which took place on December 3, 2012, he defeated by TKO in the fourth round of Nkqubel Gwazel, in 2004 knocked out Moruti Mthalane.

He is due to fight with Australian Jason Moloney in February 2018.
