= Newfel Ouatah =

French–Algerian boxer (born 1985)

Personal information
- Nationality: French
- Born: 8 November 1985 (age 40) Lyon, France
- Height: 2.00 m (6 ft 7 in)
- Weight: Heavyweight

Boxing career
- Stance: Orthodox

Boxing record
- Total fights: 24
- Wins: 18
- Win by KO: 10
- Losses: 5
- Draws: 0
- No contests: 1
Medal record
Men's Boxing
All-Africa Games
Representing Algeria
Silver medal – second place	2007 Algiers	Super Heavyweight
Mediterranean Games
Representing France
Bronze medal – third place	2005 Almeíra	Heavyweight

Newfel Ouatah (born 8 November 1985) is a French-Algerian professional boxer. As an amateur, he won a gold medal at the 2007 African Championships at super heavyweight, a silver medal at the 2007 All-African Games and fought at the 2008 Summer Olympics.

== Amateur career ==
Ouatah started boxing in 1998 after the World Cup in France, while all the other children were playing football, he prefer to start boxing in front of his block, at the Club Pugillistique Villeurbannais's Gym. He fought after two month of training his first educative fight and won it. Then he became 2000 French champion in the middleweight division (-75 kg). In 2001 he won the French Cadets (under 17) championship in the light heavyweight (-81 kg).

As a Heavyweight he won the 2002 and 2003 Junior (under 19) Nationals championships. He lost in the quarterfinals of the junior world championships when he lost to Robert Alfonso.

He became the 2005 (against Stéphane Gomis) and 2006 French champion at 201 lb by beating John M'Bumba twice time by knock out. He captured the bronze medal at the 2005 Mediterranean Games.

Then he asked the French federation to agree him to start boxing for his native country.

In 2007 he lost to M'Bumba, went up a division and started fighting for Algeria where he immediately won a silver medal at the All Africa games losing to Ahmed Samir Abdelhalim 8:17.

In 2008 he qualified for the Olympics by beating Stéphane Gomis of Sénegal and Moroccan Mohamed Amanissi 21:8 in a qualifier.

Even in April 2008 he fought his fourth fight against M'Bumba when the fight was amazingly stopped after 1:20 in the last round giving to M'Bumba a disputed winning decision.

In June 2008 he won the St Quentin's Pré Olympic tournament by winning the final against German Erik Pfeifer. He started his Olympic preparation with Jean Baptiste Mendy's coach, Houari Amri.

In the round of 16 he upset Jose Payares of Venezuela, in the quarter-final he was beaten by World Championship silver medallist Vyacheslav Glazkov of Ukraine 4:10.

At the Ahmert COMERT tournament in 2009 he took his revenge against former conqueror and 2007 PanAm and 2008 World Cup winner Robert Alfonso by KO in the second round (one-punch knockout).

== Professional career ==
He turned pro in 2009. His last fight was on 9 September 2022 with Simon Kean. This boxing fight happened in Montreal Casino, Montreal, Canada where the fight ended bizarrely, as Ouatah took a knee in the first round in protest and Kean was gifted a 1st round TKO win. Ouatah was punished with another loss on his record and his purse withheld, Ouatah later explained the reason of the in-ring protest was due to being refused insurance by the local French Boxing Federation.

== Professional boxing record ==
24 fights	18 wins	5 losses
By knockout	10	5
By decision	8	0
No contests	1	

No.	Result	Record	Opponent	Type	Round, time	Date	Location	Notes
24	Loss	18–5 (1)	Simon Kean	TKO	1 (10), 0:11	9 Sep 2022	Montreal Casino, Montreal, Canada	
23	Loss	18–4 (1)	Vladyslav Sirenko	KO	4 (8), 0:50	12 Jun 2021	AKKO International, Kyiv, Ukraine	
22	Win	18–3 (1)	Faisal Ibnel Arrami	UD	10	15 Feb 2020	Gymnase le Bourg, Gex, France	Retained French heavyweight title
21	Win	17–3 (1)	Cyril Leonet	KO	6 (10)	12 Oct 2019	Palais des sports Marcel-Cerdan, Levallois-Perret, France	Won vacant French heavyweight title
20	NC	16–3 (1)	Tamaz Zadishvili	NC	3 (6)	12 Jul 2019	Rue des Echarneaux, Valux-en-Velin, France	Both boxers DQ'd after the referee gave three warnings to both
19	Loss	16–3	Junior Fa	TKO	1 (10), 2:51	2 Mar 2019	Voinovich Center, Columbus, Ohio, U.S.	For WBO Oriental interim heavyweight title
18	Win	16–2	Tamaz Zadishvili	TKO	3 (6)	22 Dec 2018	Palais des sports Jean Capievic, Vaulx-en-Velin, France	
17	Loss	15–2	Johann Duhaupas	RTD	8 (12), 3:00	14 Dec 2017	Palais des sports Marcel-Cerdan, Levallois-Perret, France	For vacant WBA International heavyweight title
16	Win	15–1	Jakov Gospić	UD	6	11 Nov 2017	Gymnase de I'espace, Gaillard, France	
15	Win	14–1	Dmitrij Kalinovskij	UD	6	16 Jan 2016	Gymnase Jacques Anquetil, Guvors, France	
14	Win	13–1	Jean François Traoré	UD	6	28 Nov 2015	Gymnase Jacques Anquetil, Givors, France	
13	Loss	12–1	Erkan Teper	RTD	6 (12), 3:00	13 Jun 2014	Bavaria Filmstadt, Munich, Germany	For vacant European Union heavyweight title
12	Win	12–0	Grégory Tony	KO	4 (10)	30 Jan 2014	Gymnase Louison Bobet, Rillieux-la-Pape	Won vacant French heavyweight title
11	Win	11–0	Simone Loschi	TKO	1 (6)	4 May 2013	Salle Raphael de Barros, Villeurbanne, France	
10	Win	10–0	Mickaël Vieira	TKO	4 (10)	5 Oct 2012	Gymnase Richardson, Le Pouzin, France	Retained French heavyweight title
9	Win	9–0	Tomáš Mrázek	UD	6	12 May 2012	Salle Malherbes, Grenoble, France	
8	Win	8–0	Cyril Leonet	UD	10	17 Dec 2011	Palais des sports Jean Capievic, Vaulx-en-Velin, France	Retained French heavyweight title
7	Win	7–0	Cyril Leonet	UD	10	20 Nov 2010	Palais des sports Marcel-Cerdan, Levallois-Perret, France	Won vacant French heavyweight title
6	Win	6–0	Aleksandrs Selezens	RTD	1 (6), 3:00	10 Jun 2010	Stadium P. Maisonniale, Saint-Étienne, France	
5	Win	5–0	Cyril Leonet	TKO	4 (6)	23 Apr 2010	Gymnase J. Roure, Les Pennes-Mirabeau, France	
4	Win	4–0	Dmitrijs Basovs	KO	1 (4)	26 Feb 2010	Salle COSEC, Feyzin, France	
3	Win	3–0	Alban Galonnier	PTS	4	7 Nov 2009	Gymnase, Usson-en-Forez, France	
2	Win	2–0	Róbert Gregor	TKO	1 (4)	25 Aug 2009	Espace 3000, Hyères, France	
1	Win	1–0	Azzez Layachi	TKO	1 (6)	30 Jul 2009	Salle Opow, Béjaïa, Algeria	

== Personal life ==
Ouatah's the cousin of French football player Karim Benzema, Newfel's and Karim's families are from the same town in Algeria (Ath Djellil). He's also a cousin of famous Algerian singer Hanifa (Hanifa's mother is the sister of Newfel's grandfather).
