= Hamza Kramou =

Algerian boxer (born 1988)

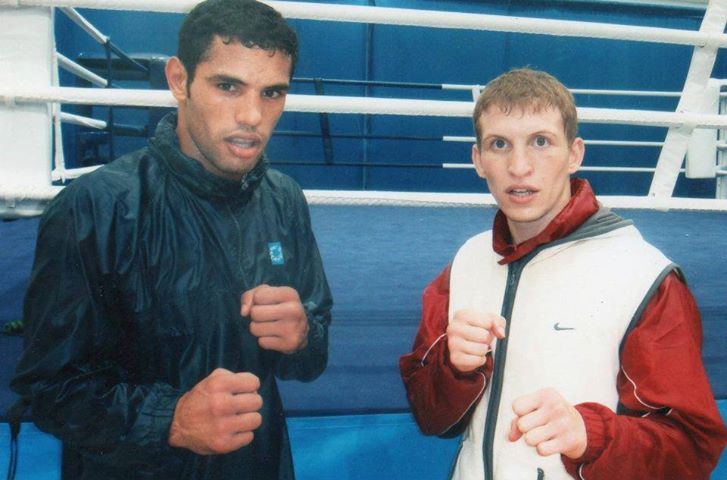
Kramou (right)

Hamza Kramou (born February 3, 1988) is an Algerian amateur boxer. He won bronze at the 2006 Junior World Championships and fought in the 2008 Olympics.

== Career ==
Kramou won featherweight bronze at Agadir 2006 at the World Juniors, where he lost to Cuban Yordan Frometa. He won the Arab Championships in February 2007 at featherweight, then moved up to lightweight. At the 2007 All-Africa Games in his home country, he was defeated by Owethu Mbira and did not medal. At the 2008 Olympic qualifier, he defeated Mbira and Tahar Tamsamani and qualified, even though he lost the final to Saifeddine Nejmaoui. At the 2008 Summer Olympics, his first bout was against favorite Yordenis Ugás of Cuba and Kramou lost 3:21.
