= Emanuel Thabiso Nketu =

Lesotho boxer (born 1980)

Emanuel Thabiso Nketu (born 25 January 1980) is an amateur boxer from Lesotho who competed at the 2008 Summer Olympics in the men's bantamweight division. He lost his opening bout to Bruno Julie of Mauritius 17–8 on points. Two years earlier, he had won two fights at the 2006 Commonwealth Games.
