= Cassius Chiyanika =

Zambian boxer (born 1984)

Cassius Chiyanika (born 1 March 1984, in Maamba, Sinazongwe District) is a Zambian amateur boxer who competed at the 2008 Olympics at flyweight.

He competed in the Commonwealth 2006 Games at junior fly but lost his first bout.

He went up to flyweight when Kennedy Kanyanta turned pro and won the 2nd AIBA African 2008 Olympic Qualifying Tournament beating fighters like Jackson Chauke thus qualifying for Beijing.

He lost his Olympic debut to Italian favorite Vincenzo Picardi 3:10.
