= Bruno Julie =

Mauritian boxer (born 1978)

Personal information
- Nicknames: Julie; Creol Crusher; Mauritian Magician
- Born: Louis Richard Bruno Julie; July 11, 1978 (age 48) Rose Hill, Mauritius

Boxing career
Medal record
Men's Boxing
Representing Mauritius
Olympic Games
| Bronze medal – third place | 2008 Beijing | Bantamweight |
Commonwealth Games
| Silver medal – second place | 2006 Melbourne | Bantamweight |
| Bronze medal – third place | 2010 Delhi | Bantamweight |
All-Africa Games
| Gold medal – first place | 2011 Maputo | Bantamweight |
| Bronze medal – third place | 2007 Algiers | Bantamweight |
African Amateur Championships
| Gold medal – first place | 2007 Antananarivo | Bantamweight |
| Silver medal – second place | 2001 Port Louis | Bantamweight |
| Silver medal – second place | 2003 Yaoundé | Bantamweight |
Jeux de la Francophonie
| Silver medal – second place | 2009 Beirut | Bantamweight |

Louis Richard Bruno Julie (born July 11, 1978), known as Bruno Julie, is a Mauritian bantamweight boxer who won a number of medals in international tournaments and competed in the 2008 Olympics where he won the first-ever Olympic medal for the island nation of Mauritius.

== Career ==
In his first major tournament, at the 2002 Commonwealth Games in Manchester, Julie reached the quarter-finals. Four years later in 2006 he reached the final by defeating Botswana's Mmoloki Nogeng, losing only to Indian Akhil Kumar. He also finished second in the African Championships the same year.

In 2007 Julie won the bronze medal at the All-Africa Games in Algeria, where he was beaten in the semi-final by local hero and eventual winner Abdelhalim Ouradi. At the 2007 World Championships he beat Orzubek Shayimov but lost to Englishman Joseph Murray. Also in 2007, Julie won gold medals at the Commonwealth Championships in Liverpool and at the African Championships in Antananarivo. He won a further gold medal at the African Cup of Nations in his native country and clinched his second gold medal at the Indian Ocean Games in Madagascar, four years after his first one in Mauritius.

Julie qualified for the 2008 Olympic Games in the second qualifier by defeating Emilian Polino, despite losing the final to Issa Samir. On August 18, 2008, Bruno Julie made history by winning his quarter-final in the 54 kg bantamweight class, therefore guaranteeing himself at least a bronze medal. In doing so Julie became the first ever Olympic medalist for Mauritius. He was narrowly defeated by Yankiel León of Cuba 5-7 on the semi-final bout.

After winning the first-ever Olympic medal for the island of Mauritius, Bruno Julie got propositions from France and the United States. He confirmed this after his return to Mauritius. He said that he won this medal for all Mauritians and that he heard shouting 'Bruno Bruno' every time he was on the ring at Beijing. Mauritian fans have nicknamed Julie as the Mauritian Magician and the Creol Crusher.

He competed in the 2010 Commonwealth Games under the name of Louis Julie. On October 10, 2010 he defeated the favored player of this competition, Indian Akhil Kumar, the gold medalist of the 2006 Commonwealth Games, to proceed to the semi-finals assuring Mauritius a medal. Thus, Bruno Julie became the favored player of the 2010 Commonwealth Games as he had won the silver medal in the 2006 Commonwealth Games and defeated Akhil Kumar. Unfortunately, he was knocked out in the semi-finals, gaining only a Bronze medal.

=== Commonwealth results ===
2006 (as a bantamweight) (as Louis Richard Bruno Julie)

- Defeated Immanuel Naidjala (Namibia) 26-10
- Defeated Abid Ali (Pakistan) 27-13
- Defeated Matthew Edmonds (Wales) 21-8
- Defeated Mmoloki Nogeng (Botswana) 21-10
- Lost to Akhil Kumar (India) 12-20

2010 (as a bantamweight) (as Louis Julie)

- Defeated Taiwo Agbaje (Nigeria) 9-4
- Defeated Revocatus Shomari (Tanzania) 12-1
- Defeated Akhil Kumar (India) 7-5
- Lost to Sean McGoldrick (Wales) 1-2

=== Olympic results ===
2008 (as a bantamweight)

- Defeated Emanuel Thabiso Nketu (Lesotho) 17-8
- Defeated Khurshid Tadjibayev (Uzbekistan) 16-4
- Defeated Héctor Manzanilla (Venezuela) 13-9
- Lost to Yankiel León (Cuba) 5-7

This was the first medal Mauritius had ever won in the history of the Olympics.

=== World amateur championship results ===
2007 (as bantamweight)

- Defeated Francisco Castillejo (Spain) RSCO 3
- Defeated Orzubek Shayimov (Uzbekistan) 34-13
- Lost to Joe Murray (England) 19-26
