= Abdelaziz Touilbini =

Algerian boxer (born 1978)

Personal information
- Full name: Abdelaziz Touilbini
- Nationality: Algeria
- Born: October 16, 1978 (age 47)
- Height: 1.88 m (6 ft 2 in)
- Weight: 91 kg (201 lb)

Sport
- Sport: Boxing
- Weight class: Heavyweight
Medal record
All-Africa Games
| Bronze medal – third place | 2007 Algiers | Heavyweight |

Abdelaziz Touilbini (born October 16, 1978) is an Algerian boxer. He is best known for having competed in the 2008 Olympics in the Heavyweight division.

== Career ==
In 2007, Touilbini won bronze at the All-Africa Games after losing to eventual winner Mourad Sahraoui in the semifinal.

Touibini beat David Assienne and Mohamed Arjaoui at the Olympic qualifier. He lost his Olympic debut to Deontay Wilder 4:10.
