= Joseph Mhlongo =

South African soccer player

Personal information
- Date of birth: 25 September 1990 (age 36)
- Place of birth: Tembisa, South Africa
- Position: Midfielder

Team information
- Current team: Moroka Swallows

Senior career*
Years	Team	Apps	(Gls)
2013–2014	Roses United	8	(1)
2014–2015	FC Cape Town	6	(1)
2015	Free State Stars		
2015–2016	FC Cape Town	2	(0)
2017–2020	Black Leopards	60	(6)
2020–	Moroka Swallows	0	(0)
- * Club domestic league appearances and goals as of 16:58, 2 October 2020 (UTC)

Joseph Mhlongo (born 25 September 1990) is a South African soccer player who plays as a midfielder for South African Premier Division side Moroka Swallows.

== Club career ==
Born in Tembisa, He joined Free State Stars in the summer of 2015, but left the club in the September of that year.

He left Black Leopards at the end of the 2019–20 season.

He signed for Moroka Swallows on a two-year contract in September 2020.
