= Alaa Shili =

Tunisian boxer (born 1987)

Personal information
- Full name: Alaa al Shili
- Nationality: Tunisia
- Born: November 10, 1987 (age 38)
- Height: 1.73 m (5 ft 8 in)
- Weight: 57 kg (126 lb)

Sport
- Sport: Boxing
- Weight class: Featherweight
Medal record
All-Africa Games
Silver medal – second place	2007 Algiers	Featherweight
Mediterranean Games
Bronze medal – third place	2018 Tarragona	Lightweight

Alaa Shili (born November 10, 1987) is a Tunisian boxer who won the featherweight silver at the 2007 All-Africa Games and to qualified for the 2008 Olympics.

== Career ==
At the All Africa final he lost to Abdelkader Chadi. At the Olympic qualifier Chadi beat him for a second time but a win over Thabiso Nketu was enough to get the third available berth. At the Olympics he beat German Wilhelm Gratschow 14:5 but lost to Mexican Arturo Santos Reyes2:14.
