= Prince Octopus Dzanie =

Ghanaian boxer

Prince Dzanie
Personal information
- Nationality: Ghanaian
- Born: Accra, Ghana
- Weight: Bantamweight; Super-bantamweight

Boxing career
- Stance: Orthodox

Boxing record
- Total fights: 28
- Wins: 25
- Win by KO: 20
- Losses: 3

Prince Octopus Dzanie is a Ghanaian professional boxer. As an amateur, he represented Ghana at the 2008 Olympics.
