= Samuel Kotey Neequaye =

Ghanaian boxer

Personal information
- Nickname: Unbelievable
- Nationality: Ghanaian
- Born: 5 July 1983 (age 43) Accra, Ghana
- Height: 5 ft 9 in (175 cm)
- Weight: Lightweight; Welterweight

Boxing career
- Stance: Orthodox

Boxing record
- Total fights: 26
- Wins: 23
- Win by KO: 16
- Losses: 3

Samuel Kotey Neequaye (born 5 July 1983) is a Ghanaian professional boxer who held the WBA-NABA lightweight title in 2013. As an amateur he represented Ghana at the 2008 Olympics.
