= Mahdi Ouatine =

Moroccan boxer (born 1987)

Mahdi/Mehdi Ouatine (born 26 September 1987) is a Moroccan amateur boxer who qualified for the 2008 Summer Olympics by winning the 1st AIBA African 2008 Olympic Qualifying Tournament in the featherweight division. He lost his Olympic debut 1:10 to Mongolian Zorigtbaataryn Enkhzorig.
