= Mourad Sahraoui =

Tunisian boxer (born 1983)

Personal information
- Born: January 12, 1983 (age 43)
Medal record
Men's Boxing
Representing Tunisia
All-Africa Games
Gold medal – first place	2007 Algiers	Heavyweight
Mediterranean Games
Gold medal – first place	2001 Tunis	Light Heavyweight
Gold medal – first place	2005 Almeíra	Light Heavyweight

Mourad Sahraoui (Arabic: مراد الصحراوي) (born January 12, 1983) is an amateur boxer from Tunisia best known for winning Gold in the heavyweight division at the 2007 All-African Games.

== Career ==
Sahraoui failed to qualify for the 2004 Athens Games by ending up in third place at the 2nd AIBA African 2004 Olympic Qualifying Tournament in Gaborone, Botswana. He won the 2005 Africa Championships. At the World Championships in 2005 he competed at light heavyweight and defeated Yusiel Napoles and two other opponents, but lost in the quarterfinal to eventual winner Yerdos Dzhanabergenov.

At the Arab Championships 2007 he defeated Abdelhafid Benchebla, but lost the final to Egyptian Ramadan Yasser 13:14. At the 2007 All-Africa Games he fought at heavyweight and defeated David Assiene of Cameroon and Abdelaziz Toulbini of Algeria in the first rounds and then Lateef Kayode of Nigeria in the final.

At the PanArab Games he once again fought at light heavy and again was edged out by Yasser in the final 6:7. He qualified for the Olympics 2008 but lost to Zhang Xiaoping 1:3.
