= Joseph Mulema =

Cameroonian boxer (born 1982)

Personal information
- Nationality: Cameroonian
- Born: 13 September 1982 (age 43)
- Weight: Welterweight

Boxing career

Boxing record
- Total fights: 13
- Wins: 7
- Win by KO: 2
- Losses: 5
- Draws: 1
Medal record
Men's amateur boxing
Representing Cameroon
African Games
Gold medal – first place	2011 Maputo	Welterweight
Francophonie Games
Gold medal – first place	2009 Beirut	Welterweight
African Championships
Bronze medal – third place	2011 Yaoundé	Welterweight

Joseph Mulema (born 13 September 1982) is a welterweight boxer from Cameroon who fought at the 2008 Olympics. He won a gold medal in the men's welterweight event at the 2011 All-Africa Games.

== World Series of Boxing record ==
3 fights	1 win	2 losses
By knockout	0	0
By decision	1	2

No.	Result	Record	Team	Opponent (Team)	Type	Round, time	Date	Location	Notes
3	Loss	1–2	Paris United	(Republic of Ireland) William McLaughlin (Milano Thunder)	TKO	4 (5)	5 March 2012	Paris, France	
2	Loss	1–1	Paris United	(Croatia) Matej Dujić (Beijing Dragons)	WO	-	21 February 2012	Macau, Macau	
1	Win	1–0	Paris United	(China) Shang Dongxu (Beijing Dragons)	PTS	5	1 February 2012	Paris, France	WSB debut

== Professional boxing record ==
13 fights	7 wins	5 losses
By knockout	2	0
By decision	5	5
Draws	1	

No.	Result	Record	Opponent	Type	Round, time	Date	Location	Notes
13	Win	7–5–1	(France) Mevludin Suleymani	PTS	8	22 Feb 2020	Salle Damremon, Boulogne-sur-Mer, France	
12	Loss	6–5–1	(Germany) Xhek Paskali	UD	8	17 Nov 2018	EWS Arena, Göppingen, Germany	
11	Loss	6–4–1	(Belgium) Mohamed El Achi	PTS	8	23 Dec 2017	Salle Antoine Blondin, Lille, France	
10	Win	6–3–1	(Russia) Timur Nikarkhoev	RTD	4 (8)	29 Apr 2017	Espace Francois Mitterrand, Hénin-Beaumont, France	
9	Win	5–3–1	(France) Shamil Ismailov	SD	8	28 Jan 2017	Complexe Sportif du Pilori, Campbon, France	
8	Win	4–3–1	(France) Shamil Ismailov	KO	(8) 8	12 Nov 2016	Salle Damremon, Boulogne-sur-Mer, France	
7	Loss	3–3–1	(Armenia) Armen Ypremyan	UD	8	17 Jun 2016	Centre Sportif Obercorn, Differdange, Luxembourg	
6	Loss	3–2–1	(France) Shamil Ismailov	MD	6	22 Apr 2016	Salle la Soucoupe, Saint-Nazaire, France	
5	Loss	3–1–1	(France) Jessy Luxembourger	UD	6	2 Apr 2016	Salle Wiesberg, Forbach, France	
4	Draw	3–0–1	(France) Ludovic Millet	MD	6	26 Mar 2016	Salle Renoux, Meaux, France	
3	Win	3–0–0	(France) Baptiste Castegnaro	PTS	6	10 Nov 2015	Salle Damremon, Boulogne-sur-Mer, France	
2	Win	2–0–0	(France) Gregory Louyest	PTS	8	7 Mar 2015	Cité des Sports, Granville, France	
1	Win	1–0–0	(Latvia) Raimonds Sniedze	UD	6	11 Apr 2013	Salle Leon Blum, Boulogne-sur-Mer, France	Professional debut
