= John Joe Joyce =

Irish boxer

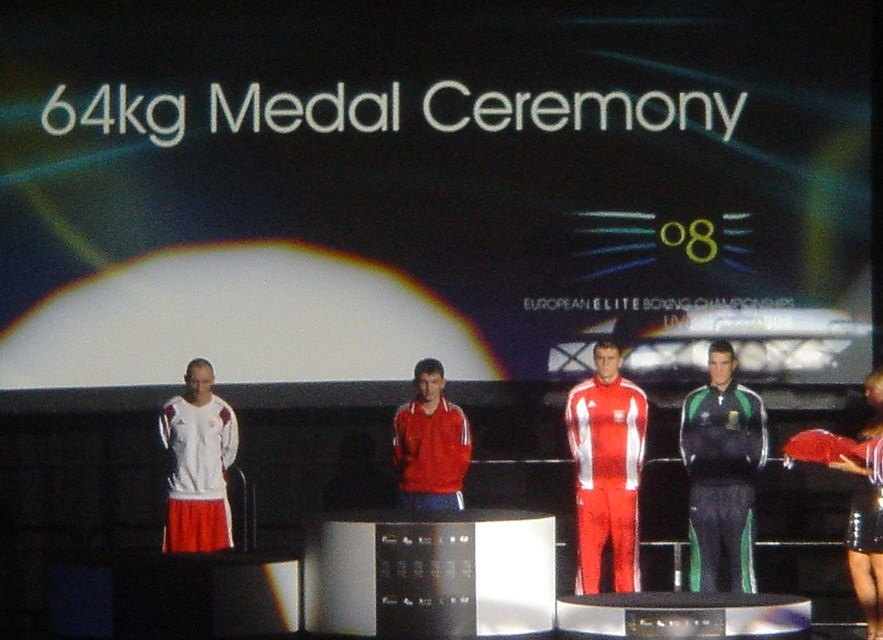
- John Joe Joyce (far right)

Personal information
- Born: 17 October 1987 (age 38)
- Relative: Patsy Joyce (nephew)
Medal record
Representing Ireland
Men's Boxing
European Amateur Championships
Bronze medal – third place	2008 Liverpool	Light welterweight

John Joe Joyce (born 17 October 1987) is an Irish amateur boxer who represented Ireland in the 2008 Olympic Games in the light welterweight division.

Joyce was born in Mullingar, County Westmeath. Joyce is a national Irish boxing champion who competed in the light welterweight and welterweight division. In the 2008 Olympic games he defeated Gyula Kate of Hungary by a score of 9–5, but lost via countback the round of 16 to eventual gold medallist Felix Diaz of the Dominican Republic in a match that was scored at a tie (11-11).
