= Emilian Polino =

Tanzanian boxer (born 1981)

Emilian Patrick Polino (born 11 May 1981) is a boxer from Tanzania who qualified for the 2008 Olympics at bantamweight.

== Career ==
In 2002 and 2006, the civil servant from Dar es Salaam competed in the Commonwealth Games but exited in the first round on both occasions. At the first Olympics qualifier he again lost in the first round, at the second he was defeated by veteran Bruno Julie but grabbed the last remaining berth by edging out Ugandan Aldina Muzei 6:5. Ultimately, Polino did not compete in Beijing, however.
