= Hastings Bwalya =

Zambian boxer (born 1985)

Personal information
- Born: 25 August 1985 (age 40) Lusaka, Zambia
- Height: 174 cm (5 ft 9 in)
Medal record
Men's Boxing
Representing Zambia
All-Africa Games
Gold medal – first place	2007 Algiers	Light Welterweight

Hastings Bwalya (born 25 August 1985) is a Zambian boxer who won the 2007 All-Africa Games at junior welter, and then competed in the 2008 Summer Olympics.

== Career ==
Bwalya was defeated in the first round of the 2006 Commonwealth Games at lightweight, and moved up a division. He beat Herbert Nkabiti from Botswana in the 2007 All-African final. In 2008 he qualified for Beijing. He was edged out 21:22 by Moroccan Driss Moussaid in the semis but beat Abdelrahman Salah for the third spot. At the Olympics he lost his first bout 8:12 to Mongolian Uranchimegiin Mönkh-Erdene.

He compiled a 12–0 record as a professional. His career was placed on a hiatus after he sustained an injury.

Olympic Games
Preceded by Davis Mwale	Flag bearer for Zambia; Beijing 2008	Succeeded by Prince Mumba
