= Stephen Sutherland =

Australian boxer

Personal information
- Full name: Stephen Robert Sutherland
- Nationality: Australia
- Born: 19 August 1990 (age 35) Welwyn Garden City, Hertfordshire
- Height: 1.79 m (5 ft 10 in)
- Weight: 56 kg (123 lb)

Sport
- Sport: Boxing
- Weight class: Light Flyweight
- Club: Carrum Boxing Club

Stephen Sutherland (born 1990-08-19 in Welwyn Garden City, Hertfordshire, England) is an Australian amateur boxer who qualified for the 2008 Olympics at flyweight.

At the 2007 World Championships he still competed at light-flyweight where he lost to Luis Yanez. After moving up a class the 17year old from Victoria qualified for Beijing by winning the Oceanian Games 2008 but lost to Walid Cherif 2:14.

Sutherland represented Australia at the 2008 Olympic Games in Beijing but bowed out in the first round. He was considered one of the best prospects in Australian boxing but has since stopped boxing.

He was an Australian Institute of Sport scholarship holder.
