= Todd Kidd =

Australian boxer

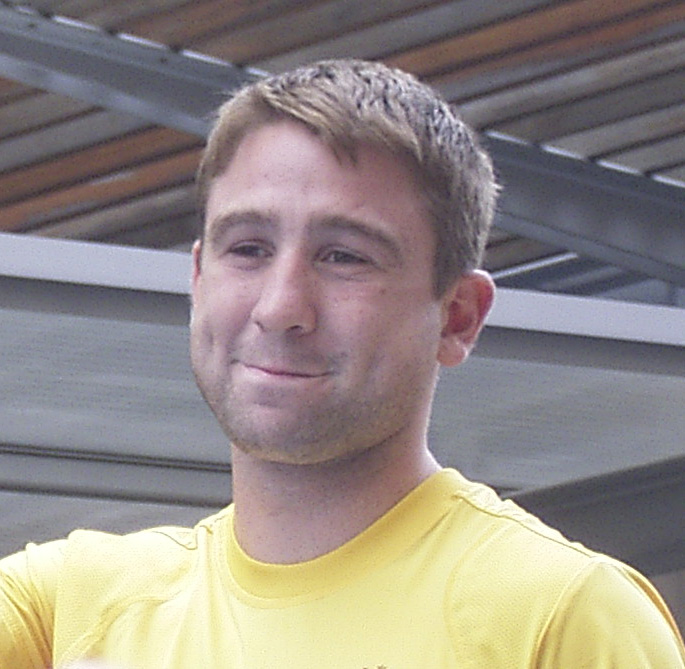
Todd Kidd

Todd Alan Kidd (born 15 April 1985) is an Australian amateur boxer best known to qualify for the Olympics 2008 at light welterweight.

== Career ==
Kidd hails from Caboolture, Queensland and can train full-time due to sponsorships and won the Australian title 2004–2006.

At the 2006 Commonwealth Games he beat Kevin Bizier but lost to eventual winner James Russan.

2007 he won the Commonwealth Championships in England, at the World Championships he beat Jonathan Gonzalez but lost to Vasili Belous.

He competed at the 2008 Summer Olympics and lost in 1st Round to Driss Moussaid

He was an Australian Institute of Sport scholarship holder.
