= Ahmed Saraku =

Ghanaian boxer

Medal record

Men's Boxing

Representing Ghana

All-Africa Games
Silver medal – second place	2007 Algiers	Middleweight

Ahmed Saraku (born 1986) is a Ghanaian amateur boxer who won silver at the Light Heavyweight 81 kg at the African Championship Madagascar 2007. At the 2007 All-Africa Games he dropped down to middleweight and won silver. He qualified for the Olympics by winning two fights and won silver early in 2008.

== Career ==
He became national welterweight champion in 2005 and went to the Commonwealth Games 2006 where he lost his first bout 7:13 to Neil Perkins.

At the African Championships he competed at light heavy and won silver.

At the All-Africa Games he dropped down to middleweight and lost the final 8:9 to local hero Nabil Kassel. At the world championships, he lost his first bout to Bosco Draskovic.

He qualified for the Olympics by winning two bouts in a qualifier, one of them against Daniel Shishia.

== Personal life ==
Saraku is married to Ghanaian-born Australian Sabina Saraku. They have a daughter.
