= Jonny Sánchez =

Venezuelan boxer (born 1987)

Jonny Jesus Sánchez Miquilena (born May 12, 1987) is a Venezuelan amateur boxer. He participated in the 2008 Olympics. He lost his first fight to two-time world champion Serik Sapiyev of Kazakhstan.
