= Wilhelm Gratschow =

German boxer (born 1982)

Personal information
- Full name: Wilhelm Gratschow
- Nationality: Germany
- Born: October 18, 1982 (age 43) Tashkent, Uzbek SSR, Soviet Union
- Height: 1.65 m (5 ft 5 in)
- Weight: 57 kg (126 lb)

Sport
- Sport: Boxing
- Weight class: Featherweight
- Club: BCV Gifhorn
Medal record
EU Amateur Championships
Bronze medal – third place	2003 Strasbourg	Bantamweight
Bronze medal – third place	2005 Cagliari	Bantamweight

Wilhelm Gratschow (born 18 October 1982 in Tashkent) is a German amateur boxer who qualified for the 2008 Olympics.

== Career ==
Gratschow started as a bantamweight and became German Champion in 2004, in 2005 he lost in the semifinal. He failed to qualify for the 2004 Summer Olympics by ending up in third place at the 1st AIBA European 2004 Olympic Qualifying Tournament in Plovdiv, Bulgaria. He won bantamweight bronze at the so-called EU-championships after losing to Detelin Dalakliev. Starting with 2006 he competed at featherweight. At the end of 2007 he became German Champion at featherweight and was sent to the qualifier. After being beaten by Azerbaijani boxer Shanin Imranov in the semi-final of a European qualifying tournament he qualified for the Olympics by defeating English boxer Stephen Smith in the third place box off.
