= Mohamed Amanissi =

Moroccan boxer

Mohamed Amanissi (born July 29, 1981) is a Moroccan boxer who qualified for the 2008 Olympics at Super Heavyweight.

At the 2005 World Championships he lost against Mike Wilson 20:27, in 2007 he lost to Czech Vladimir Prusa 16:22. At the first qualifier 2008 he lost to local Newfel Ouatah 8:21. In the final of the second Qualification tournament he beat fellow qualifier Onorede Ehwareme 10:2.

He missed qualification for the Athens Games by ending up in third place at the 1st AIBA African 2004 Olympic Qualifying Tournament in Casablanca, Morocco.
