= Walid Cherif =

Tunisian boxer (born 1978)

Personal information
- Full name: Walid Cherif
- Nationality: Tunisia
- Born: 9 March 1978 (age 48)
- Height: 1.62 m (5 ft 4 in)
- Weight: 51 kg (112 lb)

Sport
- Sport: Boxing
- Weight class: Light Flyweight
Medal record
All-Africa Games
Gold medal – first place	2003 Abuja	Flyweight
Mediterranean Games
Silver medal – second place	2005 Almeíra	Flyweight
Bronze medal – third place	2001 Tunis	Light Flyweight

Walid Cherif (born 9 March 1978) is a boxer from Tunisia, who won the gold medal in 2003 at the All-Africa Games in Abuja, Nigeria.

He also participated in the 2004 Summer Olympics, where he was beaten in the first round of the Flyweight (51 kg) division by Georgia's Nikoloz Izoria.

Cherif also competed at the 2008 Summer Olympics. He beat Australian Stephen Sutherland and upset 2005 world champ Lee Ok-Sung before losing 5:7 to Italy's Vincenzo Picardi in the quarterfinal. He was a member of the team that competed for Africa at the 2005 Boxing World Cup in Moscow, Russia.
