= Hamza Hassini =

Tunisian boxer (born 1987)

Personal information
- Born: July 18, 1987 (age 38) Tunis, Tunisia

Sport
- Country: Tunisia
- Sport: Boxing

Hamza Hassini (born August 18, 1987) is a Tunisian amateur boxer. He qualified for the 2008 Olympics in the Light Welterweight division.

Hassini defeated, among others, Herbert Nkabiti and Abdelrahman Salah. A final loss to fellow qualifier Driss Moussaid was meaningless.

At the Olympics, he lost to Iranian Morteza Sepahvand.
