= Abdelillah Nhaila =

Moroccan boxer (born 1981)

Abdelillah Nhaila (born December 2, 1981) is a Moroccan amateur boxer who competed in the 2008 Summer Olympics in the flyweight division but lost his first bout to Samir Mammadov.
