= Bastir Samir =

Ghanaian boxer (born 1989)

Personal information
- Born: May 19, 1989 (age 37)
Medal record
Men's Boxing
Representing Ghana
All-Africa Games
Silver medal – second place	2007 Algiers	Welterweight

Bastir Samir (born May 19, 1989) is a Ghanaian boxer who won silver in the welterweight division at the 2007 All-Africa Games. He qualified for the Olympics 2008 in the light-heavyweight division.

== Career ==
Samir is the brother of bantamweight Issa Samir and is the team captain of Ghana's national team Black Bombers. He won the African Championships in the welterweight division in May 2007. At the All-African Games, he knocked out Egypt's Hosam Bakr Abdin, but lost the final bout to Tunisia's Rached Merdassi.

He missed the world championships as he could not make the weight and had to jump two weight classes to light-heavyweight to qualify for the 2008 Summer Olympics because Ahmed Saraku was the established middleweight. He managed to achieve this in the second qualifier.

== Professional record ==
5 Wins (5 knockouts), 0 Losses, 0 Draw
Res.	Record	Opponent	Type	Rd., Time	Date	Venue and Location	Notes
—N/a	—N/a	—N/a	-	(4)	November 27, 2010	MGM Grand, Las Vegas, Nevada, United States	
—N/a	—N/a	(United States) Damion Reed	-	(4)	November 6, 2010	Prudential Center, Newark, New Jersey, United States	
