= Driss Moussaid =

Moroccan boxer

- Born: March 29, 1988; Morocco
- Occupation: Boxer
- Known for: Winning bronze at the 2006 World Junior Championships; competing at the 2008 Summer Olympics

Driss Moussaid (born March 29, 1988) is a boxer from Morocco who won bronze at the World Junior Championships 2006 and qualified for the Olympics 2008 at Junior Welter.

== Career ==
He won a bronze medal in 2006 at the World Junior Championship in his native country when he lost the semifinals to eventual Hungarian winner Balazs Bacskai. At the Olympic qualifier he edged out All Africa champ Hastings Bwalya and also beat Hamza Hassini. Moussaid beat Todd Kidd of Australia in the Men's Light Welter (64 kg) on the second day of the 2008 Beijing Olympics.
