= Boxing at the 2008 Summer Olympics =

Boxing at the Games of the XXIX Olympiad
- Venue: Workers Indoor Arena
- Dates: 9–24 August 2008
- Competitors: 283 from 77 nations

The boxing program of the 2008 Summer Olympics in Beijing, China was held at the Workers Indoor Arena.

Medals were awarded in eleven events, with each event corresponding to a recognized weight division of male boxers. The 2008 games were the last Olympic boxing competition to exclude women, as the International Olympic Committee approved the introduction of female boxing events for the 2012 London Olympics. The other is baseball.

Like other Olympic combat sports, two bronze medals are awarded; in the case of boxing, both losing semi-finalists receive a bronze medal, with no further play-off. As a result, the quarter-final essentially equates to a bronze medal match, a semi-final to a silver medal match, and the final to a gold medal match. 44 medals are therefore available, 22 of which are bronze medals.

== Medal table ==
Rank	Nation	Gold	Silver	Bronze	Total
1	China	2	1	1	4
2	Russia	2	0	1	3
3	Italy	1	1	1	3
4	Mongolia	1	1	0	2
4	Thailand	1	1	0	2
6	Great Britain	1	0	2	3
7	Kazakhstan	1	0	1	2
7	Ukraine	1	0	1	2
9	Dominican Republic	1	0	0	1
10	Cuba	0	4	4	8
11	France	0	2	1	3
12	Ireland	0	1	2	3
13	Armenia	0	0	1	1
13	Azerbaijan	0	0	1	1
13	India	0	0	1	1
13	Mauritius	0	0	1	1
13	Moldova	0	0	1	1
13	South Korea	0	0	1	1
13	Turkey	0	0	1	1
13	United States	0	0	1	1
Totals (20 entries)		11	11	22	44

== Medal summary ==
Event	Gold	Silver	Bronze
Light flyweight	Zou Shiming; China	Pürevdorjiin Serdamba; Mongolia	Paddy Barnes; Ireland; Yampier Hernández; Cuba
Flyweight	Somjit Jongjohor; Thailand	Andry Laffita; Cuba	Georgy Balakshin; Russia; Vincenzo Picardi; Italy
Bantamweight	Enkhbatyn Badar-Uugan; Mongolia	Yankiel León; Cuba	Bruno Julie; Mauritius; Veaceslav Gojan; Moldova
Featherweight	Vasyl Lomachenko; Ukraine	Khedafi Djelkhir; France	Yakup Kılıç; Turkey; Shahin Imranov; Azerbaijan
Lightweight	Aleksei Tishchenko; Russia	Daouda Sow; France	Hrachik Javakhyan; Armenia; Yordenis Ugás; Cuba
Light welterweight	Manuel Félix Díaz; Dominican Republic	Manus Boonjumnong; Thailand	Roniel Iglesias; Cuba; Alexis Vastine; France
Welterweight	Bakhyt Sarsekbayev; Kazakhstan	Carlos Banteaux Suárez; Cuba	Hanati Silamu; China; Kim Jung-joo; South Korea
Middleweight	James DeGale; Great Britain	Emilio Correa; Cuba	Darren Sutherland; Ireland; Vijender Singh; India
Light heavyweight	Zhang Xiaoping; China	Kenny Egan; Ireland	Tony Jeffries; Great Britain; Yerkebuian Shynaliyev; Kazakhstan
Heavyweight	Rakhim Chakhkiev; Russia	Clemente Russo; Italy	Osmay Acosta; Cuba; Deontay Wilder; United States
Super heavyweight	Roberto Cammarelle; Italy	Zhang Zhilei; China	Vyacheslav Glazkov; Ukraine; David Price; Great Britain

== Events ==
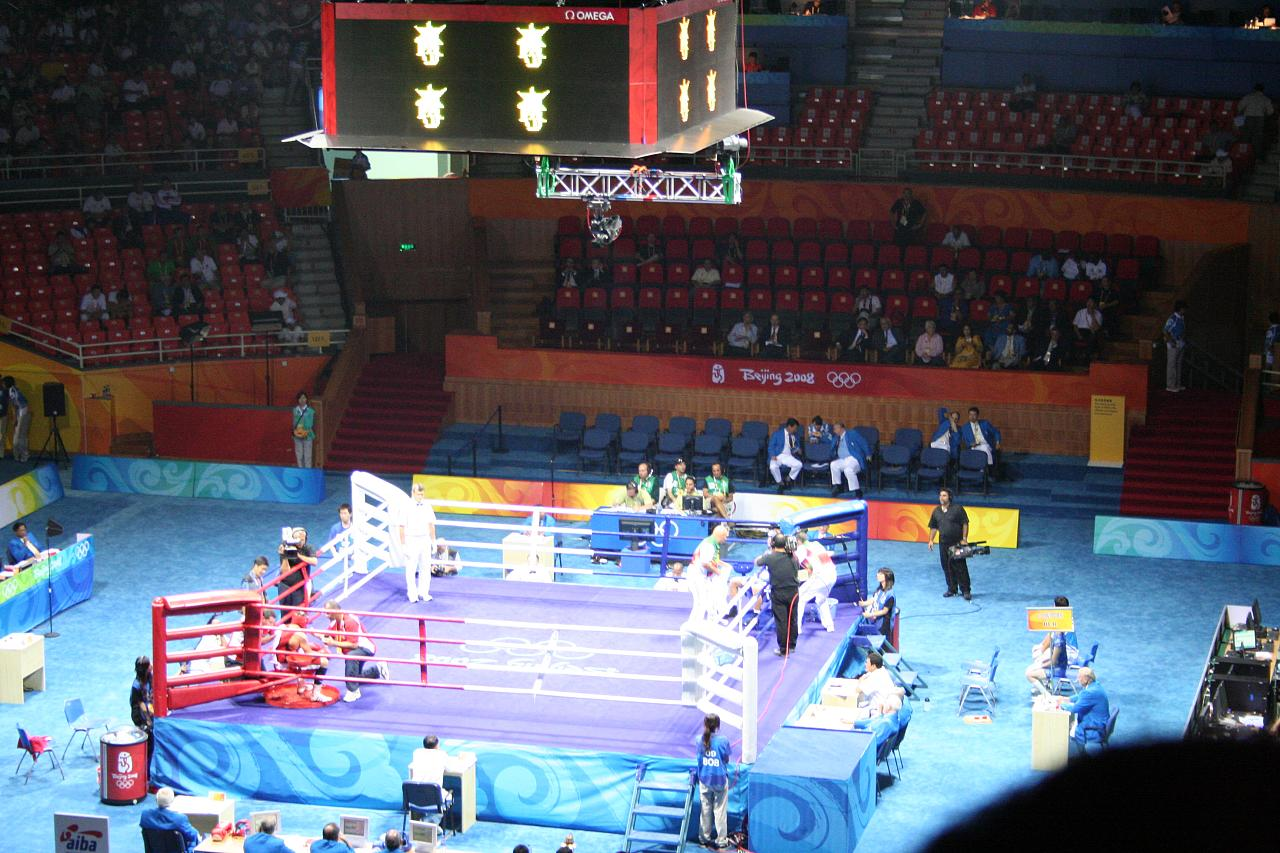

- Light flyweight (−48 kg)
- Flyweight (48–51 kg)
- Bantamweight (51–54 kg)
- Featherweight (54–57 kg)
- Lightweight (57–60 kg)
- Light welterweight (60–64 kg)
- Welterweight (64–69 kg)
- Middleweight (69–75 kg)
- Light heavyweight (75–81 kg)
- Heavyweight (81–91 kg)
- Super heavyweight (+91 kg)

== Qualifying criteria ==
A National Olympic Committee (NOC) were entitled to enter up to 1 athlete in each event. Nine places were reserved for the host nation, from which it would choose 6 places maximum, while the remaining places would be allocated to the Tripartite Invitation Commission. For each athlete from the host NOC who qualified through the AIBA World Amateur Boxing Championships, the host nation lost a guaranteed place.

Qualification events were:

- 2007 World Amateur Boxing Championships – October 23 – November 3 (8 athletes for −81 kg categories, 4 athletes for +81 kg)
- Continental Olympic Qualifying Events (during 2008, two events in Africa, America, Asia and Europe)
- 2008 Oceania Boxing Championships

The quota awarded to each of the continents is as follows:

Event	Africa	Asia	Europe	America	Oceania	Host/Invitation	TOTAL
Light Fly (−48 kg)	6	6	8	6	1	1	28
Fly (48–51 kg)	6	6	8	6	1	1	28
Bantam (51–54 kg)	6	6	8	6	1	1	28
Feather (54–57 kg)	6	6	8	6	1	1	28
Light (57–60 kg)	6	5	9	6	1	1	28
Light Welter (60–64 kg)	6	5	9	6	1	1	28
Welter (64–69 kg)	6	5	9	6	1	1	28
Middle (69–75 kg)	6	5	9	6	1	1	28
Light Heavy (75–81 kg)	6	5	9	6	1	1	28
Heavy (81–91 kg)	3	2	7	3	1	–	16
Super Heavy (+91 kg)	3	2	7	3	1	–	16
TOTAL	60	53	91	60	11	9	284*

* Two additional places will be awarded by Tripartite Invitation Commission, so the athlete quota will be 286

== Participating nations ==
- Algeria (7)
- Argentina (1)
- Armenia (4)
- Australia (9)
- Azerbaijan (2)
- Bahamas (1)
- Belarus (2)
- Botswana (2)
- Brazil (6)
- Bulgaria (2)
- Cameroon (3)
- Canada (1)
- Central African Republic (1)
- China (10)
- Colombia (5)
- Croatia (2)
- Cuba (10)
- Dominican Republic (6)
- Democratic Republic of the Congo (1)
- Ecuador (3)
- Egypt (3)
- France (9)
- The Gambia (1)
- Georgia (2)
- Germany (4)
- Ghana (6)
- Great Britain (7)
- Greece (2)
- Grenada (1)
- Guatemala (1)
- Haiti (1)
- Hungary (5)
- India (5)
- Iran (3)
- Ireland (5)
- Italy (6)
- Japan (2)
- Kazakhstan (10)
- Kenya (4)
- Kyrgyzstan (1)
- Lesotho (1)
- Lithuania (3)
- Madagascar (1)
- Mauritius (2)
- Mexico (3)
- Moldova (2)
- Mongolia (4)
- Montenegro (1)
- Morocco (10)
- Namibia (3)
- Nigeria (4)
- North Korea (1)
- Papua New Guinea (1)
- Philippines (1)
- Poland (2)
- Puerto Rico (5)
- Romania (2)
- Russia (11)
- Samoa (1)
- Sierra Leone (1)
- South Africa (1)
- South Korea (5)
- Spain (1)
- Sri Lanka (1)
- Sweden (2)
- Tajikistan (3)
- Thailand (8)
- Tunisia (5)
- Turkey (8)
- Turkmenistan (1)
- Uganda (1)
- Ukraine (7)
- United States (8)
- Virgin Islands (2)
- Uzbekistan (7)
- Venezuela (6)
- Zambia (3)
