= Osmay Acosta =

Cuban boxer (born 1985)

Personal information
- Full name: Osmay Acosta Méndez Duarte
- Nationality: Cuba
- Born: April 3, 1985 (age 41) Havana, Ciudad de la Habana
- Height: 1.88 m (6 ft 2 in)
- Weight: 91 kg (201 lb)

Sport
- Sport: Boxing
- Weight class: Heavyweight
Medal record
Olympic Games
Bronze medal – third place	2008 Beijing	Heavyweight
World Amateur Championships
Silver medal – second place	2009 Milan	Heavyweight
Pan American Games
Gold medal – first place	2007 Rio	Heavyweight
Central American and Caribbean Games
Gold medal – first place	2006 Cartagena	Heavyweight

Osmay Acosta Méndez Duarte (born April 3, 1985) is a Cuban former amateur boxer, who competed between 2001 and 2010, best known to win the 2007 PanAm Games at Heavyweight with 201 lbs (91 kg) limit.

== Career ==
Acosta is a 1,85 m tall fighter, a southpaw, who won the 165 lbs world cadet championships 2001 vs Zaur Teymurov and became the junior world champion at 75 kg/165 lbs in 2002 in Santiago de Cuba beating Russian Nikolai Galacki 10:9, Uzbek Alisher Matniazov KO, and Kazack Dmitriy Gotfrid in the final 14:8.

At senior level he first struggled badly, in 2005 he was disqualified at the nationals at 178 lbs.

At the national senior championships ("Playa Girón") 2006 he was beaten inside the distance by Odlanier Solis in an attempt to compete at super heavyweight so he dropped down to 201 lbs where he won the 2006 Central American Games.

He was part of the Cuban team that won the 2006 Boxing World Cup.

He became national champion at 201 lbs vs. Ismaikel Perez in 2007 and defeated southpaw Adam Willett 22:3 in the PanAm qualifier. He won the 2007 PanAm games stopping local favourite Rafael Lima in the semifinals and easily beating Jose Julio Payares of Venezuela 11:3 (including a knockdown) in the finals.

At the Nations Cup he beat Alexander Povernov 14:8, at the Ahmet Comert Cup 2007 he defeated European Champion Denis Poyatsika. He would have been one of the top favorites at the world championships 2007 but Cuba didn't participate.

Acosta was undefeated for more than a year then was upset at the 2008 Strandzha Cup by an unknown Scotsman Stevie Simmons and struggled at the National Championships.

He qualified for Beijing by winning the first Olympic qualifier by beating fellow-qualifier Deontay Wilder in the final. At the Olympics he lost to the eventual Russian winner Chakhkeiv.

At the 2009 World Amateur Boxing Championships he defeated John M'Bumba but lost the final to fellow southpaw Egor Mekhontsev and won silver.

=== Highlights ===
(gold) Cuban National Youth Championships (75 kg), Santiago de Cuba, Cuba, May 2001:

- 1/8: Defeated Alexander López RSC 4 (1:24)
- 1/4: Defeated Yoandri Duvergel by unanimous decision, 5–0 (4 rds)
- 1/2: Defeated Leiser Guzmán by unanimous decision, 5–0 (4 rds)
- Finals: Defeated Maikel Gómez by unanimous decision, 5–0 (4 rds)

(gold) XXXVII Cuban National School Games (75 kg), Santiago de Cuba, Cuba, July 2001:

- 1/4: Defeated Yunieski Pacheco RSC 3
- 1/2: Defeated Yeliexer Delis RET 2 (1:02)
- Finals: Defeated Yunieski Gonzalez 11–9

(gold) World Cadet Championships (75 kg), Baku, Azerbaijan, October 2001:

- 1/8: Defeated Mikhtar Ruzibayev (Kazakhstan)
- 1/4: Defeated Aleksandr Koval (Ukraine)
- 1/2: Defeated Maksim Volf (Russia)
- Finals: Defeated Zaur Teymurov (Azerbaijan)

(gold) VIII Roberto Balado Memorial (75 kg), Havana, Cuba, May 2002:

- Finals: Defeated Gerardo Castaño (Cuba) by unanimous decision, 5–0 (4 rds)

(gold) World Youth Championships (75 kg), Santiago de Cuba, Cuba, November 2002:

- 1/8: Defeated Levitico Neumann (Germany) 14–1 (4 rds)
- 1/4: Defeated Nikolay Galachkin (Russia) 10–9 (4 rds)
- 1/2: Defeated Alisher Matniyazov (Uzbekistan) KO 3
- Finals: Defeated Dmitriy Gotfrid (Kazakhstan) 14–8 (4 rds)

(gold) IX Roberto Balado Memorial (81 kg), Havana, Cuba, May 2003:

- Finals: Defeated Yislán Barrera (Cuba) by split decision, 4–1 (4 rds)

XLIII Playa Girón (81 kg), Camagüey, Cuba, January 2004

- Lost to Ismaikel Pérez (Cuba) 8–10 (4 rds)

XLIV Playa Girón (81 kg), Pinar del Río, Cuba, January 2005:

- Lost to Yuniel Dorticos (Cuba) DQ 4

(bronze) XLV Playa Girón (+91 kg), Bayamo, Cuba, January 2006:

- 1/8: Defeated Alexander Marín (Cuba) by split decision, 3–2 (4 rds)
- 1/4: Defeated Yurinieski Chibás (Cuba) by unanimous decision, 5–0 (4 rds)
- 1/2: Lost to Odlanier Solís (Cuba) RET 3

(gold) III Cuban Olympiad (91 kg), Havana, Cuba, April 2006:

- 1/4: Defeated Juanerge Castillo (Dominican Republic) RSCO 1
- 1/2: Defeated Isael Álvarez (Cuba) 22–7 (4 rds)
- Finals: Defeated Glendys Hernández (Cuba) RSCH 3

China–Cuba Duals (91 kg), Havana, Cuba, May 2006:

- Defeated Yao Wei (China) 9–2 (4 rds)

(gold) XX Central American and Caribbean Games, Cartagena, Colombia, July 2006:

- 1/4: Defeated Juan de Jesús Paredes (Dominican Republic) 14–5 (4 rds)
- 1/2: Defeated John Nieves (Colombia) 10–1 (4 rds)
- Finals: Defeated José Payares (Venezuela) 13–9 (4 rds)

(silver) World Cup (91 kg), Baku, Azerbaijan, October 2006:

- 1/8: Defeated Zhenis Taumurinov (Kazakhstan) RSCO
- 1/4: Defeated Adam Willett (United States) 17–4 (4 rds)
- 1/2: Defeated Elchin Alizade (Azerbaijan) 28–10 (4 rds)
- Finals: Lost to Rakhim Chakhkiev (Russia) 15–24 (4 rds)

(gold) XLVI Playa Girón (91 kg), Sancti Spiritus, Cuba, January 2007:

- 1/16: Defeated Noel Hernández (Cuba) RET 3
- 1/8: Defeated Yuckleidis Fuentes (Cuba) by walkover
- 1/4: Defeated Yasmani Consuegra (Cuba) 9–5 (4 rds)
- 1/2: Defeated Yunieski Gonzalez (Cuba) 22–8 (4 rds)
- Finals: Defeated Ismaikel Pérez (Cuba) 18–14 (4 rds)

I Pan American qualifier (91 kg), Barquisimeto, Venezuela, February 2007:

- 1/4: Defeated José Payares (Venezuela) 10–4 (4 rds)
- 1/2: Defeated Azea Augustama (Haiti) RSCI
- Finals: Defeated Adam Willett (Dominican Republic) 22–3 (4 rds)

(gold) XXVI Independence Cup (91 kg), Santiago, Dominican Republic, February 2007:

- 1/4: Defeated Juanerge Castillo (Dominican Republic) 19–17 (4 rds)
- 1/2: Defeated Víctor Segura (Dominican Republic) 22–6 (4 rds)
- Finals: Defeated Rafael Lima (Brazil) 15–11 (4 rds)

National match-up (91 kg), Havana, Cuba, March 2007:

- Defeated Yunieski Gonzalez (Cuba) by unanimous decision, 5–0 (4 rds)

National match-up (91 kg), Havana, Cuba, April 2007:

- Defeated Ismaikel Pérez (Cuba) 9–5 (4 rds)

France–Cuba Duals (91 kg), Amiens, France, April 2007:

- Defeated Emmanuel Zombi (France) 28–4 (4 rds)

(gold) Nations Cup (91 kg), Calais, France, April 2007:

- 1/2: Defeated David Reed (England) 26–7 (4 rds)
- Finals: Defeated Alexander Povernov (Germany) 8–4 (4 rds)

Romania–Cuba Duals (91 kg), Bucharest, Romania, May 2007:

- Defeated Petrisol Gananau (Romania) 3–0 (4 rds)

(gold) XXII Ahmet Comert Memorial (91 kg), Istanbul, Turkey, May 2007:

- 1/8: Defeated Mustafá Dede (Turkey) by walkover
- 1/4: Defeated Sergey Pivovarenko (Ukraine) by walkover
- 1/2: Defeated Remzi Ozbek (Turkey) 14–4 (4 rds)
- Finals: Defeated Denys Poyatsyka (Ukraine) RET 3

(gold) XXXVIII Giraldo Córdova Cardín (91 kg), Santa Clara, Cuba, May 2007:

- 1/2: Defeated José Miguel Piloto (Cuba) 24–8 (4 rds)
- Finals: Defeated Deivis Julio (Colombia) 9–3 (4 rds)

(gold) XV Pan American Games (91 kg), Río de Janeiro, Brazil, July 2007:

- 1/4: Defeated Deivis Julio (Colombia) 10–2 (4 rds)
- 1/2: Defeated Rafael Lima (Brazil) RSC 2 (1:53)
- Finals: Defeated José Payares (Venezuela) 11–3 (4 rds)

Cuban National Team Championships (91 kg), Havana, Cuba, November 2007:

- Defeated Daniel Echevarria (Cuba) RET 1
- Defeated Nelson De La Rosa (Cuba) RET 2
- Defeated Reinier Castillo (Cuba) 9–0 (4 rds)
- Defeated Yoandri Reyna Poll (Cuba) RSC 2
- Defeated José Miguel López (Cuba) 14–0 (4 rds)

(gold) XLVI Playa Girón (91 kg), Holguín, Cuba, January 2008:

- 1/4: Defeated Nelson De La Rosa (Cuba) 11–0 (4 rds)
- 1/2: Defeated Erislandy Savón (Cuba) 6–3 (4 rds)
- Finals: Defeated Yunieski Gonzalez (Cuba) 16–14 (4 rds)

Local match-up (91 kg), Sancti Spiritus, Cuba, January 2008:

- Defeated Noel Hernández (Cuba) RET 3

LIX Strandzha Cup (91 kg), Plovdiv, Bulgaria, February 2008:

- Lost to Stephen Simmons (Scotland) 16–21 (4 rds)

(gold) XXVII Independence Cup (91 kg), Santiago, Dominican Republic, February 2008:

- 1/4: Defeated Juan de Jesúa Paredes (Dominican Republic) 9–0 (4 rds)
- 1/2: Defeated Rafael Lima (Brazil) 6–1 (4 rds)
- Finals: Defeated Jorge Quiñonez (Ecuador) 13–0 (4 rds)

I Olympic Qualifier of the Americas (91 kg), Puerto España, Trinidad and Tobago, March 2008:

- 1/4: Defeated Emanuel Anderson (Barbados) 10–6 (4 rds)
- 1/2: Defeated Jacques-Louis Sylvera (Canada) 9–1 (4 rds)
- Finals: Defeated Deontay Wilder (United States) 12–1 (4 rds)

(gold) IV Cuban Olympiad (91 kg), Havana, Cuba, April 2008:

- 1/8: Defeated Wualfredo Rivero (Venezuela) 5–0 (4 rds)
- 1/4: Defeated José Fernández (Cuba) 5–0 (4 rds)
- 1/2: Defeated Erislandy Savón (Cuba) 13–8 (4 rds)
- Finals: Defeated Yasmany Consuegra (Cuba) 10–5 (4 rds)

(silver) VIII Klitschko Brothers Tournament (91 kg), Kyiv, Ukraine, May 2008

- 1/4: Defeated Clemente Russo (Italy) 4–2 (4 rds)
- 1/2: Defeated Sergey Pivovarenko (Ukraine) 12–4 (4 rds)
- Finals: Lost to Oleksandr Usyk (Ukraine) 4–10 (4 rds)

(gold) XXXIX Usti Nad Labem Grand Prix (91 kg), Usti nad Labem, Czech Republic, June 2008:

- 1/4: Defeated Aleksandr Beleziun (Lithuania) RSC 2
- 1/2: Defeated Lukas Schulz (Germany) by walkover
- Finals: Defeated Vladimir Prusa (Czech Republic) RSC 2

Cuba–France Duals (91 kg), Havana, Cuba, June 2008:

- Defeated John M'Bumba (France) by unanimous decision, 5–0 (4 rds)

(bronze) XXIX Summer Olympics (91 kg), Beijing, China, August 2008:

- 1/8: Defeated Olanrewaju Durodola (Nigeria) 11–0 (4 rds)
- 1/4: Defeated Helias Pavlidis (Greece) 7–4 (4 rds)
- 1/2: Lost to Rakhim Chakhkiev (Russia) 5–10 (4 rds)

(gold) Ostrava Grand Prix (91 kg), Ostrava, Czech Republic, October 2008:

- 1/4: Defeated József Darmos (Hungary) 9–1
- 1/2: Defeated Vladimir Reznicek (Czech Republic) 13–5
- Finals: Defeated Vitalijus Subačius (Lithuania) 4–2

Cuban National Team Championships (91 kg), Santiago de Cuba, Cuba, November 2008:

- Defeated Reinier Castillo RET 2
- Defeated Yoandry Reyna Poll RET 2
- Defeated Jorge Luis Garbey RET 4

(gold) World Cup (91 kg), Moscow, Russia, December 2008:

- 1/4: Defeated Yevgeniy Romanov (Russia) 15–4
- 1/2: Defeated Roman Masalimov (Russia) 21–3
- Finals: Defeated Oleksandr Usyk (Ukraine) by walkover

(gold) XLVIII Playa Girón (91 kg), Guantanamo, Cuba, January 2009:

- 1/8: Defeated Yuniel Castro RET 1
- 1/4: Defeated Yoandri Maceo 10–0
- 1/2: Defeated Jorge Luis Garbey 5–2
- Finals: Defeated Pedro Julio Rodriguez 20–12

(gold) LIII Bocskai Memorial (91 kg), Debrecen, Hungary, February 2009:

- 1/8: Defeated Stjepan Vugdelija (Croatia) 10–2
- 1/4: Defeated Ali Mazaheri (Iran) 8–1
- 1/2: Defeated John M'Bumba (France) 11–9
- Finals: Defeated Yevgeniy Romanov (Russia) 7–2

(bronze) LX Strandzha Cup (91 kg), Plovdiv, Bulgaria, February 2009:

- 1/4: Defeated Oleksandr Trifonov (Ukraine) 2–0
- 1/2: Lost to Egor Mekhontsev (Russia) 2–6

(gold) XXIV Ahmet Comert Memorial (91 kg), Istanbul, Turkey, April 2009:

- 1/4: Defeated Mihail Muntean (Moldova) 3–0
- 1/2: Defeated József Darmos (Hungary) 10–0
- Finals: Defeated Sergey Kalchugin (Russia) 10–5

(gold) XXIX Giraldo Córdova Cardín (91 kg), Sancti Spiritus, Cuba, June 2009:

- 1/2: Defeated Omar Ibanez (Cuba) 10–3
- Finals: Defeated Julio Castillo (Ecuador) 9–3

(gold) VIII Pan American Championships (91 kg), Mexico City, Mexico, July 2009:

- 1/2: Defeated Deivis Julio (Colombia) 12–5
- Finals: Defeated Jacques-Louis Sylvera (Canada) 5–1

(silver) World Championships (91 kg), Milan, Italy, September 2009:

- 1/16: Defeated Con Sheehan (Ireland) 11–0
- 1/8: Defeated Tervel Pulev (Bulgaria) 11–2
- 1/4: Defeated Mohamed Arjaoui (Morocco) 6–2
- 1/2: Defeated John M'Bumba (France) 9–2
- Finals: Lost to Egor Mekhontsev (Russia) 2–12

Cuban National Team Championships (91 kg), Camagüey, Cuba, November 2009:

- Lost to Yusiel Nápoles 0–3
- Defeated Jorge Luis Garbey 5–2
- Defeated José Fernández 5–1

Kazakhstan–Cuba Duals (91 kg), Astana, Kazakhstan, December 2009:

- Lost to Vasiliy Levit 6–7

(silver) Zharylgapov Memorial (91 kg), Karaganda, Kazakhstan, December 2009:

- Finals: Lost to Zhan Kosobutskiy (Kazakhstan) 0–5

(gold) XLIX Playa Girón (91 kg), Santiago de Cuba, Cuba, January 2010:

- 1/8: Defeated Michel Prado 2–0
- 1/4: Defeated José Fernández 3–0
- 1/2: Defeated Leinier Perot 7–3
- Finals: Defeated José Larduet 9–1

LIV Bocskai Memorial (91 kg), Debrecen, Hungary, February 2010:

- 1/8: Lost to Egor Mekhontsev (Russia) 2–7

(bronze) LXI Strandzha Cup (91 kg), Yambol, Bulgaria, February 2010:

- 1/4: Defeated Ramezjon Ahmedov (Uzbekistan) 4–1
- 1/2: Lost to Sergey Kalchugin (Russia) 2–4

Cuba–Ecuador Duals (91 kg), Havana, Cuba, March 2010:

- Defeated Julio Castillo (Ecuador) 3–0

(silver) V Cuban Olympiad (91 kg), Camagüey, Cuba, May 2010:

- 1/4: Defeated Ronney Aguirre (Cuba) 18–4
- 1/2: Defeated Reinier Castillo (Cuba) 10–1
- Finals: Lost to Leinier Perot (Cuba) 1–4

Cuban National Team Championships (91 kg), Pinar del Rio, Cuba, November 2010:

- Defeated Rafael Reyes 12–2
- Lost to Leinier Perot 6–9
- Defeated Erislandy Savón 7–6
- Defeated José Fernández 7–0

(gold) Cuban National Cerro Pelado Cup (91 kg), Havana, Cuba, December 2010:

- Finals: Defeated Ronney Aguirre 15–3
