= 2009 World Amateur Boxing Championships – Light welterweight =

Boxing competitions

The Light welterweight competition was the median weight class featured at the 2009 World Amateur Boxing Championships, and was held at the Mediolanum Forum. Welterweights were limited to a maximum of 64 kilograms in body mass.

== Medalists ==
Gold	Roniel Iglesias; Cuba
Silver	Frankie Gomez; United States
Bronze	Uranchimegiin Mönkh-Erdene; Mongolia
Bronze	Gyula Káté; Hungary

== Seeds ==
1. (Cuba) Roniel Iglesias (champion)
2. (Hungary) Gyula Káté (semifinals)
3. (Mauritius) Richarno Colin (first round)
4. (Mongolia) Uranchimegiin Mönkh-Erdene (semifinals)
5. (Japan) Masatsugu Kawachi (first round)
6. (Armenia) Eduard Hambardzumyan (second round)
7. (France) Alexis Vastine (third round)
8. (Morocco) Driss Moussaid (third round)

== Draw ==
=== Finals ===
Quarterfinals
Roniel Iglesias (CUB)	RSCI
Scott Cardle (ENG)
Oleksandr Klyuchko (UKR)	12
Uranchimegiin Mönkh (MGL)	14
Frankie Gomez (USA)	RSC
Egidijus Kavaliauskas (LTU)
Rustam Svayev (KAZ)	9
Gyula Káté (HUN)	14

Semifinals
Roniel Iglesias (CUB)	6
Uranchimegiin Mönkh (MGL)	4
Frankie Gomez (USA)	8
Gyula Káté (HUN)	7

Final
Roniel Iglesias (CUB)	8
Frankie Gomez (USA)	2

=== Top Half ===
==== Section 1 ====
Round 1

Round 2
Roniel Iglesias (CUB)	14
Brice Bassok (BUR)	0
Tonde Sarouna (TOG)	4
Madadi Nagzibekov (TJK)	14
Scott Cardle (ENG)	30
Henry Lawrence (DMA)	0
Romal Amanov (AZE)	7
Alexis Vastine (FRA)	15

Round 3
Roniel Iglesias (CUB)	15
Madadi Nagzibekov (TJK)	1
Scott Cardle (ENG)	11
Alexis Vastine (FRA)	3

Quarterfinals
Roniel Iglesias (CUB)	RSCI
Scott Cardle (ENG)

==== Section 2 ====
Round 1
Driss Moussaid (MAR)	12
Precious Makina (ZAM)	8
Ivan Popovic (SRB)	18
Chang Wei Jen (TPE)	5
Faraj Almatboli (JOR)	11
Oscar Torres Romero (COL)	9
Berdymurad Sahatov (TKM)
Oleksandr Klyuchko (UKR)	KO
Dario Vangeli (ITA)	9
Carl Leviticus Hield (BAH)	3
Frederick Lawson (GHA)	22
Jophef Moshoeshoe (LES)	11
Traian Lupu (ROU)	12
Philip Sutcliffe Jnr (IRL)	5
Bela Gloner (SVK)	1
Uranchimegiin Mönkh (MGL)	29

Round 2
Driss Moussaid (MAR)	10
Ivan Popovic (SRB)	2
Faraj Almatboli (JOR)	4
Oleksandr Klyuchko (UKR)	22
Dario Vangeli (ITA)	16
Frederick Lawson (GHA)	3
Traian Lupu (ROU)	9
Uranchimegiin Mönkh (MGL)	14

Round 3
Driss Moussaid (MAR)	3
Oleksandr Klyuchko (UKR)	18
Dario Vangeli (ITA)	4
Uranchimegiin Mönkh (MGL)	15

Quarterfinals
Oleksandr Klyuchko (UKR)	12
Uranchimegiin Mönkh (MGL)	14

=== Bottom Half ===
==== Section 3 ====
Round 1
Richarno Colin (MRI)	9
Levan Gvamichava (GEO)	21
Frankie Gomez (USA)	18
Mikhail Bakarura (BLR)	4
Park Kwan Soo (KOR)	10
Jean Bikorimana (RWA)	0
Sanjarbek Rahmanov (UZB)	19
Gaber Al-Sheairy (EGY)	4
Zdenek Chladek (CZE)	10
Rayton Okwiri (KEN)	1
Maksim Ignatiev (RUS)	18
Simeon Chamov (BUL)	7
Qamil Balla (AUS)	11
Mancilla Luis (BOL)	2
Egidijus Kavaliauskas (LTU)	8
Masatsugu Kawachi (JPN)	5

Round 2
Levan Gvamichava (GEO)	6
Frankie Gomez (USA)	16
Park Kwan Soo (KOR)	2
Sanjarbek Rahmanov (UZB)	23
Zdenek Chladek (CZE)	12
Maksim Ignatiev (RUS)	2
Qamil Balla (AUS)	5
Egidijus Kavaliauskas (LTU)	20

Round 3
Frankie Gomez (USA)	19
Sanjarbek Rahmanov (UZB)	10
Zdenek Chladek (CZE)	6
Egidijus Kavaliauskas (LTU)	10

Quarterfinals
Frankie Gomez (USA)	RSC
Egidijus Kavaliauskas (LTU)

==== Section 4 ====
Round 1
Eduard Hambardzumyan (ARM)	15
Araya Quiros Freiser (CRC)	2
Ramses Agaton (MEX)	4
Onur Şipal (TUR)	9
Kanat Sydykbekov (KGZ)	4
Michal Legowski (POL)	3
Albi Sorra (ALB)	4
Rustam Svayev (KAZ)	16
Myke Carvalho (BRA)	5
Manoj Kumar (IND)	4
Aamir Khan (PAK)	1
Genebert Basadre (PHI)	5
Abdur Rahim (BAN)	6
Stevo Zolak (BIH)	4
Apichet Seansit (THA)	4
Gyula Káté (HUN)	13

Round 2
Eduard Hambardzumyan (ARM)	1
Onur Şipal (TUR)	3
Kanat Sydykbekov (KGZ)	6
Rustam Svayev (KAZ)	20
Myke Carvalho (BRA)	10
Genebert Basadre (PHI)	3
Abdur Rahim (BAN)	2
Gyula Káté (HUN)	11

Round 3
Onur Şipal (TUR)	5
Rustam Svayev (KAZ)	14
Myke Carvalho (BRA)	8
Gyula Káté (HUN)	'10

Quarterfinals
Rustam Svayev (KAZ)	9
Gyula Káté (HUN)	14

== See also ==
- Boxing at the 2008 Summer Olympics – Light welterweight
