= 2009 World Amateur Boxing Championships – Heavyweight =

Boxing competitions

The heavyweight competition was the second-highest weight class featured at the 2009 World Amateur Boxing Championships, and was held at the Mediolanum Forum. Heavyweights were limited to a maximum of 91 kilograms in body mass.

== Medalists ==
Gold	Egor Mekhontsev; Russia
Silver	Osmay Acosta; Cuba
Bronze	John M'Bumba; France
Bronze	Oleksandr Usyk; Ukraine

== Seeds ==
1. (Cuba) Osmay Acosta (final)
2. (Italy) Clemente Russo (third round)
3. (Ukraine) Oleksandr Usyk (semifinals)
4. (France) John M'Bumba (semifinals)
5. (Morocco) Mohamed Arjaoui (quarterfinals)
6. (Tajikistan) Jahon Qurbonov (second round)
7. (Armenia) Tsolak Ananikyan (first round)
8. (Hungary) Jozsef Darmos (third round)

== Draw ==
=== Finals ===
Quarterfinals
Osmay Acosta (CUB)	6
Mohamed Arjaoui (MAR)	2
Ramzjon Ahmedov (UZB)	7
John M'Bumba (FRA)	15
Oleksandr Usyk (UKR)	19
Vitalijus Subacius (LTU)	1
Bahram Muzaffer (TUR)	5
Egor Mekhontsev (RUS)	7

Semifinals
Osmay Acosta (CUB)	9
John M'Bumba (FRA)	2
Oleksandr Usyk (UKR)	10
Egor Mekhontsev (RUS)	14

Final
Osmay Acosta (CUB)	2
Egor Mekhontsev (RUS)	12

=== Top half ===
==== Section 1 ====
Round 1

Round 2
Osmay Acosta (CUB)	11
Con Sheehan (IRL)	0
Abdul Walid (AFG)	1
Tervel Pulev (BUL)	17
Mihail Muntean (MDA)	4
Mohammad Ghosson (SYR)	8
Ramazan Ashi (KGZ)	2
Mohamed Arjaoui (MAR)	9

Round 3
Osmay Acosta (CUB)	11
Tervel Pulev (BUL)	2
Mohammad Ghosson (SYR)	7
Mohamed Arjaoui (MAR)	+7

Quarterfinals
Osmay Acosta (CUB)	6
Mohamed Arjaoui (MAR)	2

==== Section 2 ====
Round 1

Round 2
Jozsef Darmos (HUN)	RSCH
Yamiko Chinula (NZL)
Dimitar Tashkov (BUL)
Ramzjon Ahmedov (UZB)	RSC
Moon Young Seang (KOR)	6
Ihab Almatbouli (JOR)	19
Jordan Shimmell (USA)	3
John M'Bumba (FRA)	10

Round 3
Jozsef Darmos (HUN)	10
Ramzjon Ahmedov (UZB)	13
Ihab Almatbouli (JOR)	10
John M'Bumba (FRA)	22

Quarterfinals
Ramzjon Ahmedov (UZB)	7
John M'Bumba (FRA)	15

=== Bottom half ===
==== Section 3 ====
Round 1
Mostyn Niemann (AUS)	RSC
Lamin Nyassi (GAM)
Elly Ajowi (KEN)	3
Stephen Simmons (SCO)	13
Maximiliano Sosa (ARG)	15
David Tsiklauri (GEO)	5
Li Bin (CHN)	4
Juan Oliva Aleman (ESP)	8
Marko Radonjic (MNE)	8
Vitalijus Subacius (LTU)	9
Borut Slapnik (SLO)	0
Jahon Qurbonov (TJK)	12

Round 2
Oleksandr Usyk (UKR)	16
Manpreet Singh (IND)	2
Mostyn Niemann (AUS)	4
Stephen Simmons (SCO)	11
Maximiliano Sosa (ARG)	RSCI
Juan Oliva Aleman (ESP)
Vitalijus Subacius (LTU)	RSC
Jahon Qurbonov (TJK)

Round 3
Oleksandr Usyk (UKR)	11
Stephen Simmons (SCO)	1
Maximiliano Sosa (ARG)	4
Vitalijus Subacius (LTU)	16

Quarterfinals
Oleksandr Usyk (UKR)	19
Vitalijus Subacius (LTU)	1

==== Section 4 ====
Round 1
Tsolak Ananikyan (ARM)	10
Sandro Dirnfeld (SVK)	11
Ramazan Magomedov (BLR)	WO
Antonie Boya (CAM)
Wisam Jabar (IRQ)	0
Marko Calic (CRO)	7
Durodola Olanrewaju (NGR)	1
Bahram Muzaffer (TUR)	13
Elchin Alizada (AZE)	DSQ
Manganyi Masana (RSA)
Egor Mekhontsev (RUS)	24
Stefan Koeber (GER)	3
Silvera Louis (CAN)
Vasiliy Levit (KAZ)	RSC
Julio Castillo (ECU)	1
Clemente Russo (ITA)	16

Round 2
Sandro Dirnfeld (SVK)	6
Ramazan Magomedov (BLR)	8
Marko Calic (CRO)	3
Bahram Muzaffer (TUR)	8
Elchin Alizada (AZE)	0
Egor Mekhontsev (RUS)	10
Vasiliy Levit (KAZ)	4
Clemente Russo (ITA)	14

Round 3
Ramazan Magomedov (BLR)	1
Bahram Muzaffer (TUR)	10
Egor Mekhontsev (RUS)	7
Clemente Russo (ITA)	5

Quarterfinals
Bahram Muzaffer (TUR)	0
Egor Mekhontsev (RUS)	6

== See also ==
- Boxing at the 2008 Summer Olympics – Heavyweight
