= Boxing at the 2008 Summer Olympics – Heavyweight =

Boxing competitions

Men's heavyweight at the Games of the XXIX Olympiad
- Venue: Workers Indoor Arena
- Date: 13–23 August 2008
- Competitors: 16 from 16 nations

Medalists
1st place, gold medalist(s)		Rakhim Chakhkiev	Russia
2nd place, silver medalist(s)		Clemente Russo	Italy
3rd place, bronze medalist(s)		Osmay Acosta	Cuba
3rd place, bronze medalist(s)		Deontay Wilder	United States

The heavyweight competition was the second-highest weight class featured in amateur boxing at the 2008 Summer Olympics, and was held at the Workers Indoor Arena. Heavyweights were limited to a maximum of 91 kilograms in body mass.

Like all Olympic boxing events, the competition was a straight single-elimination tournament. Both semifinal losers were awarded bronze medals, so no boxers competed again after their first loss. Bouts consisted of four rounds of two minutes each, with one-minute breaks between rounds. Punches scored only if the white area on the front of the glove made full contact with the front of the head or torso of the opponent. Five judges scored each bout; three of the judges had to signal a scoring punch within one second for the punch to score. The winner of the bout was the boxer who scored the most valid punches by the end of the bout.

This was the first time since 1968 that Cuba did not win the gold medal in this weight class while it was participating (i.e. excluding boycotts in 1984 and 1988).

== Draw ==
All times are China Standard Time (UTC+8)

Round of 16; Wednesday, August 13, 2008; 15:00-17:00
Osmay Acosta (CUB)	11
Olanrewaju Durodola (NGR)	0
Elias Pavlidis (GRE)	7
Milorad Gajović (MNE)	3
Deivi Julio Blanco (COL)	5
John M'Bumba (FRA)	11
Rakhim Chakhkiev (RUS)	7
Ali Mazaheri (IRI)	3
Abdelaziz Toulbini (ALG)	4
Deontay Wilder (USA)	10
Brad Pitt (AUS)	6
Mohamed Arjaoui (MAR)	11
Yushan Nijiati (CHN)	4
Oleksandr Usyk (UKR)	23
Clemente Russo (ITA)	7
Viktar Zuyev (BLR)	1

Quarterfinals; Sunday, August 17, 2008; 21:00-22:00
Osmay Acosta (CUB)	7
Elias Pavlidis (GRE)	4
John M'Bumba (FRA)	9
Rakhim Chakhkeiv (RUS)	18
Deontay Wilder (USA)	+10
Mohamed Arjaoui (MAR)	10
Oleksandr Usyk (UKR)	4
Clemente Russo (ITA)	7

Semifinals; Friday, August 22, 2008; 15:30-16:00
Osmay Acosta (CUB)	5
Rakhim Chakhkiev (RUS)	10
Deontay Wilder (USA)	1
Clemente Russo (ITA)	7

Final; Saturday, August 23, 2008; 21:20-21:40
Rakhim Chakhkiev (RUS)	4
Clemente Russo (ITA)	2

== See also ==
- 2009 World Amateur Boxing Championships – Heavyweight
