= Boxing at the 2010 South American Games – Men's +91kg =

The Men's +91 kg event at the 2010 South American Games had its quarterfinals held on March 22, the semifinals on March 25 and the final on March 27.

== Medalists ==
| Gold | Silver | Bronze |
|---|---|---|
| Jose Payares; Venezuela | Jorge Quiñonez Tenorio; Ecuador | Marcelo Cruz; Brazil; Carlos Moreno; Panama |

== Results ==
Quarterfinals
Deivi Julio Blanco (COL) | 10
Jose Payares (VEN) | 11

Semifinals
Jorge Quiñonez Tenorio (ECU) | RSCI
Carlos Moreno (PAN)
Marcelo Cruz (BRA) | 1
Jose Payares (VEN) | 7

Final
Jorge Quiñonez Tenorio (ECU) | 0
Jose Payares (VEN) | 2
