= Boxing at the 2010 South American Games =

Boxing competitions

There were 14 boxing events at the 2010 South American Games: 11 men's events and 3 women's events. Competitions were held over March 22–27. All games were played at Sabaneta.

== Medal summary ==
=== Medal table ===
Rank	Nation	Gold	Silver	Bronze	Total
1	Colombia (COL)	4	6	2	12
2	Brazil (BRA)	4	2	5	11
3	Venezuela (VEN)	3	0	3	6
4	Ecuador (ECU)	2	2	5	9
5	Argentina (ARG)	1	4	5	10
6	Peru (PER)	0	0	3	3
7	Chile (CHI)	0	0	1	1
7	Netherlands Antilles (AHO)	0	0	1	1
7	Panama (PAN)	0	0	1	1
Totals (9 entries)		14	14	26	54

== Men ==
Event	Gold	Silver	Bronze
Men's 48 kg	Arles Contreras; Colombia	Carlos Quipo Pilataxi; Ecuador	Percy Pena Mori; Peru; Eduard Bermúdez; Venezuela
Men's 51 kg	Cei Ávila; Colombia	Juliao Enriques Neto; Brazil	Luis Caycho Dávila; Peru; Fernando Martínez; Argentina
Men's 54 kg	Oscar Negrete; Colombia	Alberto Melián; Argentina	César Dahua Tuisima; Peru; Yohandry Campos; Venezuela
Men's 57 kg	Ángel Rodrígues; Venezuela	Deivis Julio Bassa; Colombia	Luis Porozo Mina; Ecuador; Ignacio Perrin; Argentina
Men's 60 kg	César Villarraga; Colombia	Éverton Lopes; Brazil	Erick Bone Banguera; Ecuador; Juan Carrasco; Argentina
Men's 64 kg	Myke Carvalho; Brazil	Miguel Escandón; Colombia	Angelo Báez Aros; Chile; Gustiniano Mina Caicedo; Ecuador
Men's 69 kg	Brian Castaño; Argentina	Leonard Carrillo; Colombia	Esquiva Florentino; Brazil; Jonny Sánchez; Venezuela
Men's 75 kg	Alfonso Blanco; Venezuela	Alex Theran; Colombia	Jaime Cortés Padilla; Ecuador; Yamaguchi Florentino; Brazil
Men's 81 kg	Carlos Góngora; Ecuador	Roaner Angulo; Colombia	Yamil Peralta; Argentina; Washington Silva; Brazil
Men's 91 kg	Julio Castillo; Ecuador	Jeisson Monroy; Colombia	Maximiliano Sosa; Argentina; Rafael Lima; Brazil
Men's +91 kg	José Payares; Venezuela	Jorge Quiñónes; Ecuador	Carlos Moreno; Panama; Marcelo Cruz; Brazil

== Women ==
Event	Gold	Silver	Bronze
Women's 51 kg	Érica Matos; Brazil	Paola Benavídes; Argentina	Ingrit Valencia; Colombia; Nupirat Kuja Wachapa; Ecuador
Women's 60 kg	Adriana Araujo; Brazil	Daiana Sánchez; Argentina	Jenifer Cáceres; Colombia; Moraily de Windt; Netherlands Antilles
Women's 75 kg	Andreia Bandeira; Brazil	Celeste Peralta; Argentina	
