= Samuel Molina =

Samuel Molina may refer to:

- Samuel Molina (actor) (1935–2018), Puerto Rican actor, writer, poet, screenwriter, songwriter, and declaimer
- Samuel Molina (boxer) (born 1998), Spanish professional boxer
