= Jorge Quiñones =

Jorge Quiñones may refer to:

- Jorge Quiñonez, Ecuadorian boxer
- Jorge Quiñones (volleyball) (born 1981), Mexican volleyball player
