= Krzysztof Rogowski =

Krzysztof Rogowski may refer to:

- Krzysztof Rogowski (boxer)
- Krzysztof Rogowski (equestrian)
