= José Payares =

Venezuelan boxer (born 1986)

Personal information
- Full name: José David Payares Julio
- Born: April 27, 1986 (age 40)
Medal record
Men's Boxing
Representing Venezuela
Pan American Games
Silver medal – second place	2007 Rio	Heavyweight
Central American and Caribbean Games
Silver medal – second place	2006 Cartagena	Heavyweight
Bronze medal – third place	2010 Mayagüez	Super Heavyweight
South American Games
Gold medal – first place	2006 Buenos Aires	Heavyweight
Gold medal – first place	2010 Medellin	Super Heavyweight

José David Payares Julio (born April 27, 1986) is a Venezuelan amateur boxer best known for winning the silver medal at the PanAm Games 2007 in the men's heavyweight division with 91 kg/201 lbs limit. He qualified for the 2008 Summer Olympics at the super heavyweight class.

== Career ==
At the world championships 2005 he lost in the first round to Jasur Matchanov.

He won the South American Games 2006 against Rafael Lima, at the Central American Games 2006 he finished second behind Osmay Acosta.

In February in a first PanAm qualifier he ran right into Acosta again and lost. In a second qualification tournament he beat two opponents inside the distance and Canadian Sebastien Lalumiere 20:5 to easily qualify.

In Rio at the PanAm Games main event he bested US southpaw Adam Willett 12:8 and Jorge Quiñones from Ecuador but was beaten in the final once again by Acosta.

=== Super Heavyweight ===
At the world championships 2007 he competed at super heavyweight and upset Hungarian Csaba Kurtucz 12:7 but ran into eventual winner Roberto Cammarelle and was outclassed 4:27.

At the first qualifier he lost to Robert Alfonso, at the second Olympic qualifier he defeated Michael Hunter to go to Beijing. In the meaningless final he also beat fellow qualifier Oscar Rivas.

In Beijing he was upset in his first bout 5:7 by Algerian Newfel Ouatah.

At the 2010 South American Games he won Gold at Super Heavyweight vs. Deivi Julio and Jorge Quinonez.

At the 2011 Pan American Games he was KOd by Juan Hiracheta.

At the Olympic qualifier he lost to Dominic Breazeale and didn't qualify.
