= Bahram Muzaffer =

Turkish boxer (born 1986)

Personal information
- Nationality: Turkish
- Born: August 4, 1986 (age 40) Fergana, Uzbek SSR, Soviet Union
- Height: 1.88 m (6.2 ft)
- Weight: 81 kg (179 lb)

Sport
- Country: Turkey
- Sport: Amateur boxing
- Events: Heavyweight, Light-heavyweight
Medal record
European Amateur Championships
Bronze medal – third place	2011 Ankara	Heavyweight
European Union Amateur Championships
Gold medal – first place	2006 Pécs	Light-heavyweight
Bronze medal – third place	2007 Dublin	Light-heavyweight
World University Boxing Championships
Silver medal – second place	2006 Almaty	Light heavyweight
Bronze medal – third place	2008 Kazan	Light heavyweight
Bronze medal – third place	2010 Ulaanbaatar	Heavyweight

Bahram Muzaffer (born August 4, 1986) is a Turkish amateur boxer competing in the light-heavyweight division.

== Biography ==
Bahram Muzaffer was born in Uzbekistan to a family of Turkish Meskhetian descent. Three years later his family fled the country in the midst of Turkish pogroms first to Russia, then to Azerbaijan, until they finally settled in Turkey in 1996. Muzaffer qualified for the 2008 Olympics at light-heavyweight after he was re-allocated the position vacated by Ismayl Sillakh. At the Olympics, Muzaffer beat Aziz Ali but lost in the round of 16 to Ireland's runner-up Kenneth Egan by 2:10.

He moved up a division and lost a surprisingly close fight at the 2009 World Amateur Boxing Championships – Heavyweight to eventual winner Egor Mekhontsev 5:7.
He won the bronze medal at the 2011 European Amateur Championships held in Ankara, Turkey losing to Tervel Pulev.

Later he went back down to win the Olympic qualifier at Light Heavyweight. At the 2012 Olympics he lost his first fight to Ehsan Rouzbahani. The Iranian edged past the first round 5-4 and the Turkish boxer clinched the second round with a similar result. In the final round, Rouzbahani gained the upper hand and upped his work rate and Muzaffer could not cope with the sudden injection of pace.

== Achievements ==
2006

- World University Championship in Almaty, Kazakhstan – Silver
- European Union Amateur Championships on May 23–27 in Pécs, Hungary – Gold

2007

- European Union Amateur Championships on June 18–23 in Dublin, Ireland – Bronze

2008

- World University Championship in Kazan, Russia – Bronze

2010

- World University Championship in Ulaanbaatar, Mongolia – Bronze

2011

- European Amateur Championships on June 17–24 in Ankara, Turkey – Bronze
