= Dmitriy Gotfrid =

Kazakhstani boxer (born 1984)

Medal record

Representing Kazakhstan

Men's Boxing

Asian Games
Bronze medal – third place	Doha 2006	Heavyweight

Dmitriy Gotfrid (born January 22, 1984, Дмитрий Владимирович Готфрид) is an amateur boxer from Kazakhstan who won the bronze medal in the Heavyweight (-91 kg) division at the 2006 Boxing at the 2006 Asian Games.

== Career ==
2002 he lost the final of the junior world championships to Osmay Acosta at 165 lbs.

At the Asian Games 2006 he lost his semifinal against Iran's eventual gold medalist Ali Mazaheri 19–25.
