= 2004 World University Boxing Championship =

Boxing competitions

The 2004 World University Boxing Championships took place in Antalya, Turkey between November 22 and 29 2004. 129 boxers from 27 countries participated at the inaugural tournament.

== Participating nations ==
- Azerbaijan
- Belarus
- China
- Croatia
- Egypt
- France
- Germany
- Greece
- Hungary
- Iran
- Ireland
- Italy
- Kazakhstan
- South Korea
- Latvia
- Pakistan
- Poland
- Romania
- Russia
- Slovakia
- Slovenia
- Thailand
- Turkey
- Turkmenistan
- Ukraine
- United States
- Uzbekistan

== Results ==
Bronze medals are awarded to both losing semi-finalists.

2004 World University Boxing Championship
Weight	Gold	Silver	Bronze	
48 kg	(China) Zou Shiming	(Uzbekistan) Fazil Fayziev	(Turkey) Abdülkadir Koçak	(Russia) Jury Mavritchev
51 kg	(Russia) Rafik Meggeramov	(Turkey) Kadri Kordel	(Ukraine) Volodymir Kladko	(France) Philippe Frenois
54 kg	(Turkey) İbrahim Aydoğan	(Uzbekistan) Aziz Ulugov	(South Korea) Hyeondec.Cheol Park	(France) Hicham Ziouti
57 kg	(Azerbaijan) Romal Amanov	(Uzbekistan) Abdugavor Umarov	(Turkey) Yakup Kılıç	(Hungary) Henrik Kertesz
60 kg	(Turkey) Selçuk Aydın	(Azerbaijan) Farhat Acalov	(Greece) Girinaios Tsinakis	(Russia) Ivan Yachmenev
64 kg	(Hungary) Gyula Kate	(Azerbaijan) Emin Maharamov	(Pakistan) Ali Ashgar Shah	(Turkmenistan) Annashat Shatov
69 kg	(Ukraine) Sergiy Derevyanchenko	(Turkey) Adem Kılıççı	(Latvia) Alexandrs Sotniks	(Azerbaijan) Rahip Baylarov
75 kg	(Russia) Ruslan Maksutor	(Uzbekistan) Abbos Atoev	(Romania) Petrisor Gananau	(Azerbaijan) Elnur Kadirov
81 kg	(Turkey) İhsan Yıldırım Tarhan	(Russia) Danil Sheva	(Iran) H. Amiri	(Hungary) Istvan Szucs
91 kg	(Ukraine) Vyacheslav Glazkov	(Azerbaijan) Elchin Alizade	(Croatia) Vedran Đipalo	(Russia) Evgeny Romanov
+91 kg	(Uzbekistan) Rustam Saidov	(China) Zhang Zhilei	(Ukraine) Andriy Rudenko	(Russia) Roman Klimenko

== Medal count table ==
2004 World University Boxing Championship
Pos	Country	Gold	Silver	Bronze	Total
1	Turkey	3	2	2	7
2	Russia	2	1	4	7
3	Ukraine	2		2	4
4	Uzbekistan	1	4		5
5	Azerbaijan	1	3	2	6
6	China	1	1		2
7	Hungary	1		2	3
8	France			2	2
9	Croatia			1	1
9	Greece			1	1
9	Iran			1	1
9	South Korea			1	1
9	Latvia			1	1
9	Pakistan			1	1
9	Romania			1	1
9	Turkmenistan			1	1
	Total	11	11	22	44

== See also ==
- World University Championships
