= Eduard Hambardzumyan =

Russian boxer

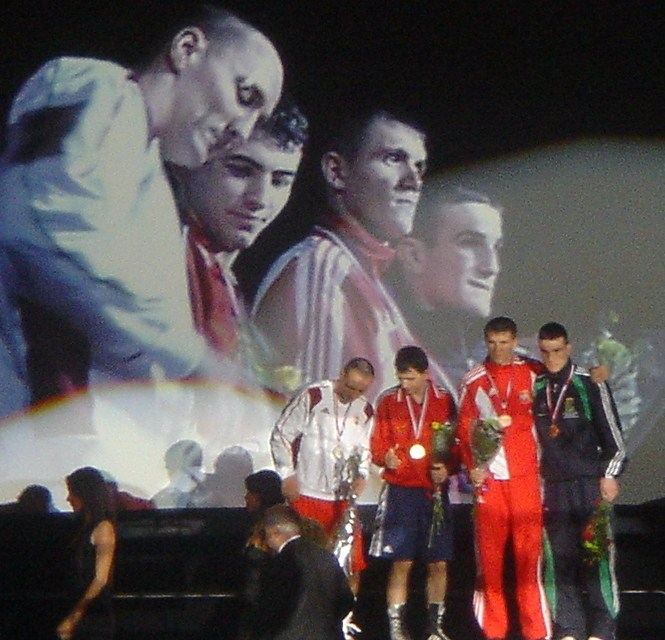
- Eduard Hambardzumyan (centre left)
Medal record
Representing Armenia
Men's Boxing
European Amateur Championships
Gold medal – first place	2008 Liverpool	Light welterweight

Eduard Hambardzumyan (Armenian: Էդուարդ Համբարձումյան; born February 23, 1986, in Sochi, Soviet Union) is an Armenian amateur boxer. He is a European Champion and Olympian and was awarded a Merited Master of Sports in boxing.

== Biography ==
Eduard Hambardzumyan was born on February 23, 1986, in Sochi, Russian SSR. Hambardzumyan won a gold medal at the 2004 Junior World Amateur Boxing Championships in Jeju. He defeated Argenis Mendez in the final. In 2006, he won a silver medal at the Russian Championships. Hambardzumyan began representing Armenia in 2007. He made it to the quarterfinals at the 2007 World Amateur Boxing Championships, guaranteeing himself participation in the upcoming Olympics. Hambardzumyan lost in his first match at the 2008 Summer Olympics to eventual gold medalist Manuel Félix Díaz. Hambardzumyan won a gold medal at the 2008 European Amateur Boxing Championships in Liverpool. He defeated Gyula Káté, who was injured in the first round of the match and was removed from the competition by the doctor, in the finals. Hambardzumyan, along with Hovhannes Danielyan, became the first boxers from the independent Republic of Armenia to become European Champions.
