= Denys Poyatsyka =

Ukrainian boxer (born 1985)

Personal information
- Born: April 29, 1985 (age 41) Krementschuk, Poltava Oblast
Medal record
Men's amateur boxing
Representing Ukraine
European Championships
Gold medal – first place	2006 Plovdiv	Heavyweight
Bronze medal – third place	2010 Moscow	Heavyweight

Denys Poyatsyka (Ukrainian: Денис Пояцика; born April 29, 1985, in Krementschuk, Poltava Oblast) is a Ukrainian retired amateur boxer, best known for winning the European title at 201 lbs in 2006.

== Career ==
Poyatsyka started to box in 1995. In 2004, he moved up to light heavy from middleweight, although he did not win the national title.

In 2006, he moved up to heavyweight with a limit of 201 lbs and won the national title. As a result, he was selected to compete at the European Championships. There, he surprised everyone by not only winning the tournament but also by displaying tremendous punching power, even managing to stop four out of five foes including Elchin Alizade and the usually durable Russian favorite Roman Romanchuk.

Afterwards, he was unable to repeat this success. In 2007, he was outpointed by Alizade at the World Championships in Chicago and did not win a medal. He was not selected for the Olympics, where Oleksandr Usyk represented Ukraine in the weight category. At the Euros 2008, he was beaten by Armenian Tsolak Ananikyan.

At the 2010 European Amateur Boxing Championships in Moscow, Russia he won the bronze medal, with Poyatsyka losing to Egor Mekhontsev from Russia in the semifinals.

He retired in 2016 and started working as a youth boxing coach in Kremenchuk.
