= Uranchimegiin Mönkh-Erdene =

Mongoliian boxer (born 1982)

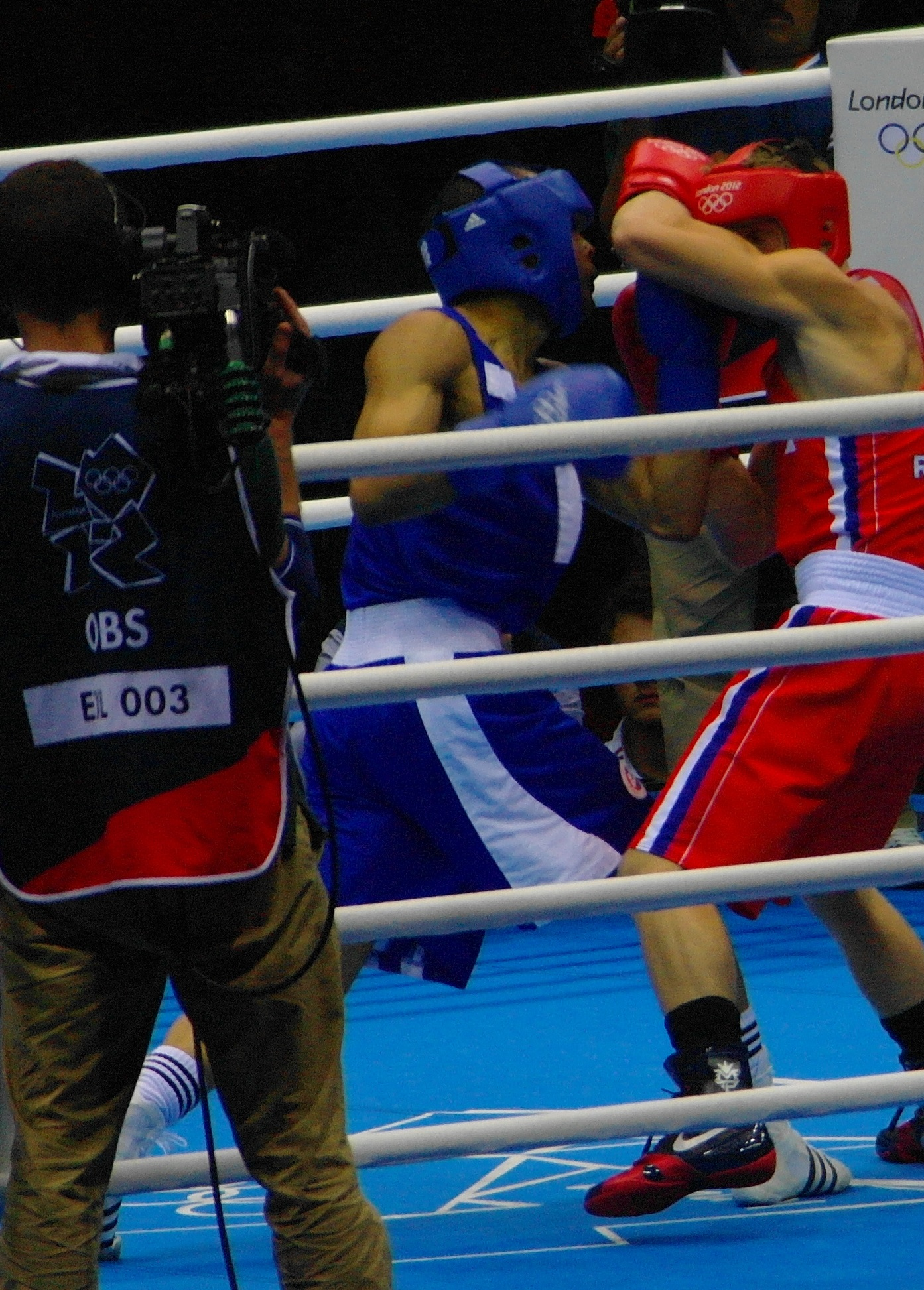
- Mönkh-Erdene fighting Zdeněk Chládek in the round of 32 bout at the 2012 Olympics

Personal information
- Nationality: Mongolia
- Born: March 22, 1982 (age 44)
- Height: 1.74 m (5 ft 9 in)
- Weight: 64 kg (141 lb)

Boxing career
- Weight class: Lightweight, Light welterweight
Medal record
Men's amateur boxing
Representing Mongolia
Olympic Games
Bronze medal – third place	2012 London	Light welterweight
World Boxing Championships
Bronze medal – third place	2009 Milan	Light welterweight
Bronze medal – third place	2013 Almaty	Light welterweight
World University Championships
Bronze medal – third place	2006 Almaty	Light welterweight
Asian Games
Silver medal – second place	2006 Doha	Lightweight
Asian Championships
Gold medal – first place	2011 Incheon	Light welterweight
Silver medal – second place	2013 Amman	Light welterweight
Bronze medal – third place	2002 Seremban	Featherweight

Uranchimegiin Mönkh-Erdene (Mongolian: Уранчимэгийн Мөнх-Эрдэнэ; born March 22, 1982) is an amateur boxer from Mongolia who competed in the Lightweight (−60 kg) and junior welterweight (-64 kg) divisions at three Olympics, in 2004, 2008 and won a bronze medal at the 2012.

In 2017, Mönkh-Erdene won a silver medal in the Eindhoven Box Cup in the Netherlands. In the quarterfinals, he won a points decision over Joe Kelly of Ireland, and in the semi-finals, won a split decision over 3-time Netherlands champion Aito Koster. In the finals, Mönkh Erdene lost by a unanimous decision against Sammy Wagensveld, also from the Netherlands.

== Career ==
- East Asian Game Gold medal 2001
- World Cup Silver medal 2008
- World Championships’ double medal (2009, 2013)
- Asian Championship Gold medal 2011
- Olympic Games bronze medal 2012.
- Eindhoven Box Cup Silver medal 2017.
