= World University Boxing Championships =

Boxing competition

- Status: active
- Genre: sports event
- Date: various
- Frequency: biannual
- Location: various
- Inaugurated: 2004
- Founder: Caner Doganeli, Anwar Chowdhry
- Most recent: 2018
- Next event: 2020
- Major events: amateur boxing
- Organiser: AIBA and FISU

The World University Boxing Championships are the official international collegiate competition in the sport of amateur boxing. Competitors are students of higher educational facilities worldwide (colleges, universities, institutes, etc.)

== Editions ==
No.	Year	Host	Venue	Dates	Team Champion
1	2004	Antalya, Turkey		22–27 November	Turkey
2	2006	Almaty, Kazakhstan	Baluan Sholak Sports Palace	3–9 October	Kazakhstan
3	2008	Kazan, Russia	Basket-Hall	20–27 September	Russia
4	2010	Ulan Baatar, Mongolia		5–10 October	Mongolia
5	2012	Baku, Azerbaijan	Baku Sports Palace	13–18 November	Azerbaijan
6	2014	Yakutsk, Russia	Triumf Sports Complex	9–14 September	Russia
7	2016	Chiang Mai, Thailand		3–8 October	Russia
8	2018	Elista, Russia	Oirat Arena	1–6 September	Russia
9	2020	Katowice, Poland	Spodek Arena	10–15 October	TBD
