= Kadri Kordel =

Turkish boxer

Personal information
- Nationality: Turkish

Sport
- Country: Turkey
- Sport: Amateur boxing
- Event: Flyweight
- Coached by: Muammer Sağlam
Medal record
European Union Championships
Bronze medal – third place	2007 Dublin	Flyweight
World University Boxing Championships
Bronze medal – third place	2008 Kazan	Flyweight
Silver medal – second place	2004 Antalya	Flyweight

Kadri Kordel is a Turkish amateur boxer in the flyweight (51 kg) division. In 2005 he fought at the World Amateur Boxing Championships in Mianyang, China in the under 48 kilogram division. He was beaten in the quarterfinals. He is currently a member of the Fenerbahçe Boxing squad. A native of Kütahya, he is coached by Muammer Sağlam.

== Achievements ==
2004.

- 1st World University Boxing Championship in Antalya, Turkey - Silver

2007

- 22nd Ahmet Cömert International Tournament in Istanbul, Turkey - Gold
- 5th European Union Amateur Boxing Championships in Dublin, Ireland - Bronze

2008

- 3rd World University Boxing Championship in Kazan, Russia - Bronze
