= 2007 European Union Amateur Boxing Championships =

Boxing competitions

2007 Men's European Union Boxing Championships
- Host city: Dublin
- Country: Ireland
- Athletes: 119
- Dates: 18–23 June

The Men's 2007 European Union Amateur Boxing Championships were held in Dublin, Ireland from 18 June to 23 June. The 5th edition of the annual competition was organised by the European governing body for amateur boxing, EABA. A total number of 119 fighters from across Europe competed at these championships.

== Medal winners ==
| Event | Gold | Silver | Bronze |
|---|---|---|---|
| Light Flyweight (– 48 kilograms) | Pal Bedak; Hungary | Kelvin de la Nieve; Spain | Nordine Oubaali; France Darren Langley; England |
| Flyweight (– 51 kilograms) | Hafid Bouji; Germany | Salim Salimov; Bulgaria | Kadri Kordel; Turkey Vincenzo Picardi; Italy |
| Bantamweight (– 54 kilograms) | Detelin Dalakliev; Bulgaria | Denis Makarov; Germany | Joseph Murray; England Rudolf Dydi; Slovakia |
| Featherweight (– 57 kilograms) | Khedafi Djelkhir; France | (Republic of Ireland) Carl Frampton; Ireland | Michał Chudecki; Poland Yakup Kılıç; Turkey |
| Lightweight (– 60 kilograms) | Daouda Sow; France | Eugen Burhard; Germany | Domenico Valentino; Italy Alejandro Rodriguez; Spain |
| Light Welterweight (– 64 kilograms) | Marcin Łęgowski; Poland | Ionut Gheorghe; Romania | Gyula Kate; Hungary Bradley Saunders; England |
| Welterweight (– 69 kilograms) | (Republic of Ireland) Roy Sheahan; Ireland | Xavier Noel; France | Adem Kılıççı; Turkey Dimitar Shtilianov; Bulgaria |
| Middleweight (– 75 kilograms) | (Republic of Ireland) Darren Sutherland; Ireland | James Degale; England | Jean Mickael Raymond; France Ivano Del Monte; Italy |
| Light Heavyweight (– 81 kilograms) | (Republic of Ireland) Kenneth Egan; Ireland | Constantin Bejenaru; Romania | Marijo Šivolija; Croatia Bahram Muzaffer; Turkey |
| Heavyweight (– 91 kilograms) | Elias Pavlidis; Greece | Clemente Russo; Italy | Vedran Djipalo; Croatia Krzysztof Zimnoch; Poland |
| Super Heavyweight (+ 91 kilograms) | Roberto Cammarelle; Italy | (Republic of Ireland) Cathal McMonagle; Ireland | Csaba Kurtucz; Hungary Cristian Ciocan; Romania |
