= Egor Mekhontsev =

Russian boxer

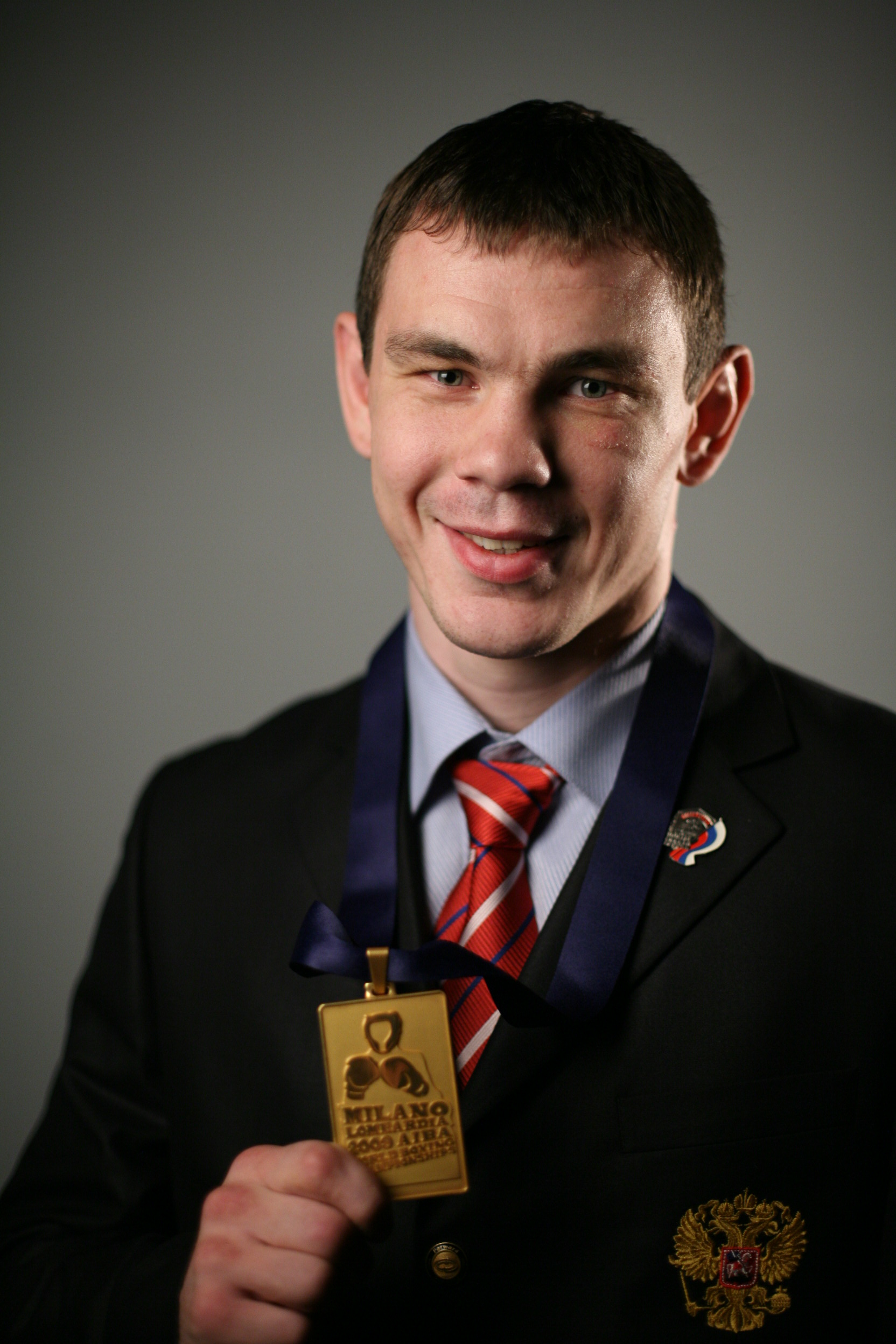
- Egor Leonidovich Mekhontsev

Personal information
- Nationality: Russian
- Born: Егор Леонидович Мехонцев; November 14, 1984 (age 41) Asbest, Russian SFSR, Soviet Union
- Height: 1.85 m (6 ft 1 in)
- Weight: Light Heavyweight

Boxing career
- Stance: Southpaw

Boxing record
- Total fights: 14
- Wins: 13
- Win by KO: 8
- Losses: 0
- Draws: 1
Medal record
Men's Boxing
Representing Russia
Men's Boxing
Summer Olympics
Gold medal – first place	2012 London	Light heavyweight
World Amateur Championships
Gold medal – first place	2009 Milan	Heavyweight
Bronze medal – third place	2011 Baku	Light heavyweight
European Amateur Championships
Gold medal – first place	2008 Liverpool	Heavyweight
Gold medal – first place	2010 Moscow	Heavyweight

Egor Leonidovich Mekhontsev (Егор Леонидович Мехонцев, transliteration Egor Leonidovich Mechoncev; born 14 November 1984), is a Russian professional boxer, who among other achievements, won gold at 2012 London Olympics in the light heavyweight division.

== Career ==
=== Light-Heavyweight ===
Southpaw Mekhontsev won a silver medal in the 2004 Light-heavyweight Russian senior national championships losing to Mikhail Gala in the final and won another silver in 2005 again losing to Gala in the semi-final by 39:26.

The following year in 2006 he won bronze losing to Artur Beterbiyev 41:30 in the semi-final and in 2007 another bronze losing to Evgeni Makarenko.

=== Change to Heavyweight ===
Mekhontsev then moved up to the heavyweight 201 lbs limit division and won the 2008 Russian national championships beating Evgeniy Romanov in the final by a score of 19–5.

At the 2008 European Amateur Boxing Championships in Liverpool he defeated Nasi Hani (Macedonia) INJ RND 4, Stephen Simmons (boxer) (Scotland) 14–1, Petrisor Gananau (Romania) 5–2 and won Gold after defeating Armenia's Tsolak Ananikyan 9–2 in the final.

At the 2009 World Amateur Boxing Championships – Heavyweight he upset Clemente Russo and beat fellow southpaws Oleksandr Usyk in the semifinal and Osmay Acosta in the final.

Mekhontsev successfully defended his title at the 2010 European Amateur Boxing Championships against Denis Poyatsika and Tervel Pulev.

=== Change to Light-Heavyweight ===
For the 2011 World Amateur Boxing Championships he traded weightclasses with Beterbiyev and dropped to light heavy. He beat Marcus Browne and Oleksandr Hvozdyk but was upset by young Cuban Julio César la Cruz and won Bronze.

At the 2012 Olympics, being 28 years of age, he beat Damien Hooper, Elshod Rasulov, Yamaguchi Falcao in the semifinals and won Gold by defeating Adilbek Niyazymbetov.

=== Turning professional ===
Mekhontsev turned professional in October 2013, signing with boxing promotion company Top Rank, which has also signed up a number of other 2012 olympic medallists.

Mekhontsev made his professional debut on December 7, 2013, dominating and knocking down opponent PJ Cajagas three times before the referee stopped the contest in the third round.

== Professional boxing record ==
14 fights	13 wins	0 losses
By knockout	8	0
By decision	5	0
Draws	1	

Res.	Record	Opponent	Type	Round	Date	Location	Notes
Win	13-0-1	(Venezuela) Gusmyr Perdomo	MD	8	2017-07-22	Moscow, Russia	
Draw	12-0-1	(United States) Alexander Johnson	MD	8	2016-08-06	(United States) Tucson, Arizona	
Win	12-0-0	(United States) Victor Barragan	KO	5 (8) 2:53	2016-04-02	(United States) Port Hueneme, California	
Win	11-0-0	(Mexico) Felipe Romero	UD	8	2016-01-30	(United States) Burbank, California	
Win	10-0-0	(Brazil) Jackson Junior	UD	8	2015-09-11	(United States) Las Vegas, Nevada	
Win	9-0-0	(France) Hakim Zoulikha	UD	8	2015-05-01	(United States) Las Vegas, Nevada	
Win	8-0-0	(Brazil) Marcelo Leandro Da Silva	TKO	1 (8) 0:31	2015-03-14	Glendale, United States	
Win	7-0-0	(Uganda) Joey Vegas	UD	8	2014-11-28	Moscow, Russia	
Win	6-0-0	(Ecuador) Jinner Guerrero	TKO	2 (8)	2014-11-08	(United States) Pharr, Texas	
Win	5-0-0	(Colombia) Samuel Miller	TKO	3 (8)	2014-09-06	(United States) Laredo, Texas	
Win	4-0-0	(Philippines) Mike Mirafuente	RTD	3 (6)	2014-07-19	The Venetian Macao, Macau, SAR	
Win	3-0-0	(United States) Dwayne Williams	TKO	3 (6)	2014-04-11	(United States) Las Vegas, Nevada	
Win	2-0-0	(Thailand) Atthaporn Jaritram	TKO	2 (6)	2014-02-22	The Venetian Macao, Macau, SAR	
Win	1–0-0	(United States) PJ Cajigas	TKO	3 (4)	2013-12-07	(United States) Atlantic City, New Jersey	Professional debut
