= 2008 World University Boxing Championship =

Boxing competitions

The 2008 World University Boxing Championships took place in Kazan, Russia between September 19-28, 2008. The championship was staged in eleven weight categories. 94 boxers and 38 officials from 16 countries participated at the championship.

== Participating nations ==
- Azerbaijan
- Belarus
- Costa Rica
- Czech Republic
- Finland
- Italy
- Kazakhstan
- Kyrgyzstan
- Lithuania
- Moldova
- Mongolia
- Russia
- Serbia
- South Africa
- Turkey
- Ukraine

== Results ==
Bronze medals are awarded to both losing semi-finalists.

2008 World University Boxing Championship
Weight	Gold	Silver	Bronze	
48 kg	(Russia) Lenar Fayzeriev	(Kazakhstan) Adler Kapezov	(Mongolia) Gonzorig Saihanbayar	(Turkey) Ferhat Pehlivan
51 kg	(Azerbaijan) Elgun Ahmedov	(Russia) Mazim Dvinskiy	(Moldova) Alehandr Riscan	(Turkey) Kadri Kordel
54 kg	(Russia) Iles Kayumov	(Mongolia) Iderhuu Enhzhargal	(Azerbaijan) Ragim Nadjafov	(Ukraine) Dimitry Rudenko
57 kg	(Russia) Viktor Batalov	(Turkey) Kerem Gürgen	(Kazakhstan) Zhaksylyk Ilyassov	(Mongolia) Munhbataar Altansuh
60 kg	(Russia) Imil Iksanov	(Kazakhstan) Idleyt Yegizekov	(Turkey) Muhammet Çat	(Mongolia) Bat-Ochir Ayuurzana
64 kg	(Russia) Alexander Zhirnov	(Azerbaijan) Anar Jafarov	(Belarus) Anatoly Navichok	(Kazakhstan) Almasbek Alibecov
69 kg	(Kazakhstan) Anton Pinchuk	(Russia) Islam Edisultanov	(Czech Republic) Martin Svoboda	(Belarus) Sergey Evstafyev
75 kg	(Belarus) Vitaly Bandarenka	(Russia) Alexander Vasilev	(Ukraine) Dimitry Dragunov	(Mongolia) Chuluuntumur Tumurhuyag
81 kg	(Ukraine) Oleksandr Gvozdyk	(Kazakhstan) Daniyar Ustembayev	(Turkey) Bahram Muzaffer	(Belarus) Sergey Karnayev
91 kg	(Russia) Alexander Karakazyan	(Kazakhstan) Vasily Levit	(Turkey) Caner Sayak	(Belarus) Viktor Chvarkov
+91 kg	(Russia) Niyaz Faizullin	(Kazakhstan) Doszhan Ospanov	(Lithuania) Marius Sperauskas	(Ukraine) Ivan Bezverhy

== Medal count table ==
2008 World University Boxing Championship
Pos	Country	Gold	Silver	Bronze	Total
1	Russia	7	3		10
2	Kazakhstan	1	5	2	8
3	Azerbaijan	1	1	1	3
4	Belarus	1		4	5
5	Ukraine	1		3	4
6	Turkey		1	5	6
7	Mongolia		1	4	5
8	Czech Republic			1	1
8	Lithuania			1	1
8	Moldova			1	1
Total		11	11	22	44

== See also ==
- World University Championships
