= 2006 European Union Amateur Boxing Championships =

Boxing competitions

2006 Men's European Union Boxing Championships
- Host city: Pecs
- Country: Hungary
- Athletes: 85
- Dates: 23–27 May

The Men's 2006 European Union Amateur Boxing Championships were held in Pécs, Hungary from May 23 to May 27. The 4th edition of the annual competition was organised by the European governing body for amateur boxing, EABA. A total number of 85 fighters from across Europe competed at these championships.

== Medal winners ==
Event	Gold	Silver	Bronze
Light Flyweight (– 48 kilograms)	Łukasz Maszczyk; Poland	Alfonso Pinto; Italy	Ronny Beblik; Germany Gergo Szalai; Hungary
Flyweight (– 51 kilograms)	Salim Salimov; Bulgaria	Guven Aydemir; Turkey	Norbert Kalucza; Hungary Amine Lamiri; France
Bantamweight (– 54 kilograms)	Zsolt Bedak; Hungary	Joseph Murray; England	Vittorio Parrinello; Italy Krzysztof Rogowski; Poland
Featherweight (– 57 kilograms)	Hicham Ziouti; France	Theodoros Papazov; Greece	Alexey Shaydulin; Bulgaria Sandor Racz; Hungary
Lightweight (– 60 kilograms)	Domenico Valentino; Italy	Selçuk Aydın; Turkey	Husnu Kocabas; Netherlands Krzysztof Szot; Poland
Light Welterweight (– 64 kilograms)	Gyula Kate; Hungary	Boris Georgiev; Bulgaria	Önder Şipal; Turkey Mariusz Koperski; Poland
Welterweight (– 69 kilograms)	Istvan Szili; Hungary	Bülent Ulusoy; Turkey	Borna Katalinic; Croatia Ryan Pickard; England
Middleweight (– 75 kilograms)	Alexander Rubjuk; Estonia	Anastasios Mperdesis; Greece	Matej Matkovic; Croatia Savaş Kaya; Turkey
Light Heavyweight (– 81 kilograms)	Bahram Muzaffer; Turkey	Constantin Bejenaru; Romania	Marijo Šivolija; Croatia (Republic of Ireland) Kenneth Egan; Ireland
Heavyweight (– 91 kilograms)	John M'Bumba; France	Łukasz Janik; Poland	Vedran Djipalo; Croatia Jozsef Darmos; Hungary
Super Heavyweight (+ 91 kilograms)	Roberto Cammarelle; Italy	Roy Ignacia; Netherlands	Laszlo Gschwendtner; Hungary Krzysztof Zimnoch; Poland
