= Frankie Gómez =

American boxer (born 1992)

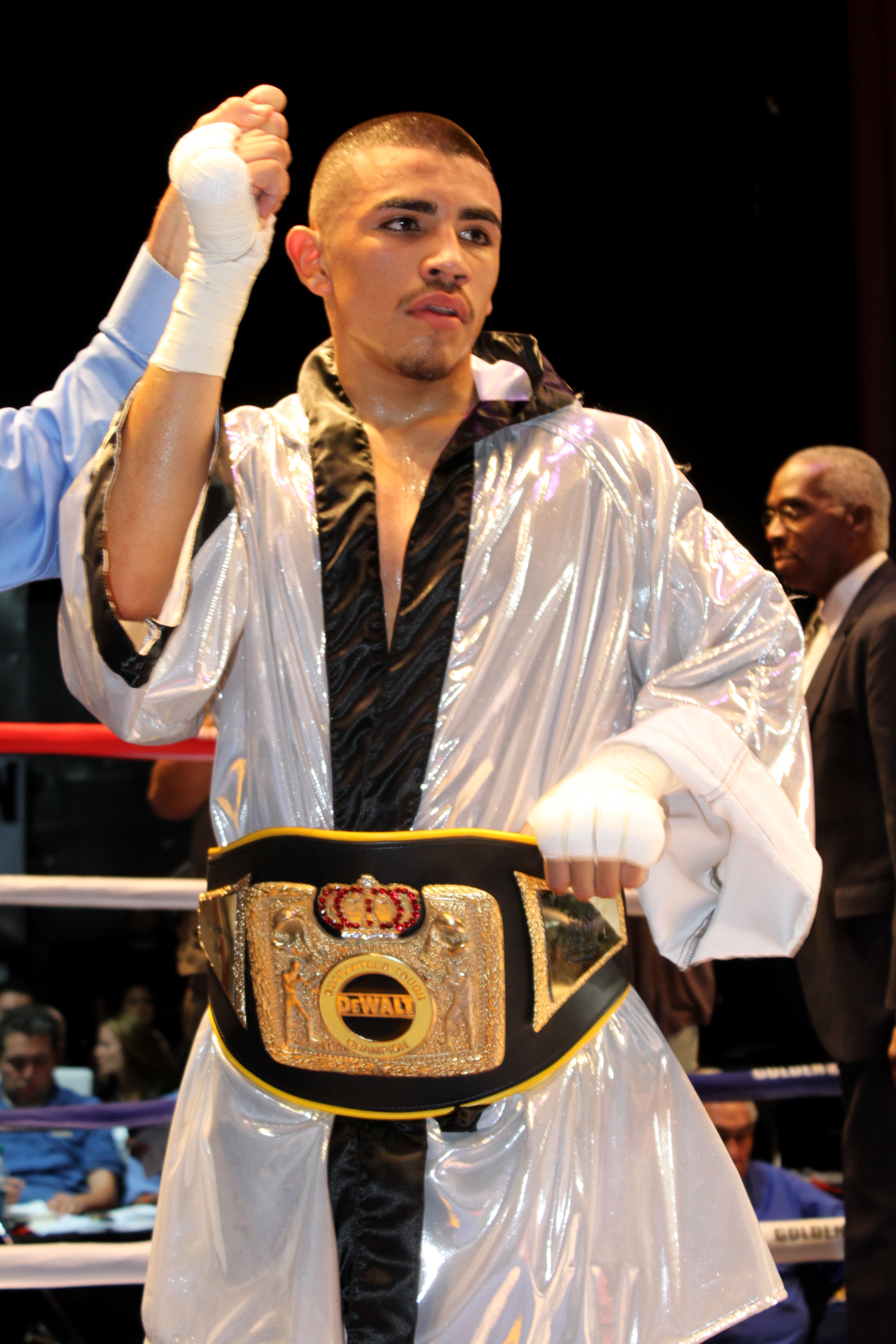
- Frankie Gómez in 2010

Personal information
- Nickname: Pitbull
- Born: Jesús Francisco Gómez; February 4, 1992 (age 34) Los Angeles, California, U.S.
- Height: 5 ft 8 in (173 cm)
- Weight: Light welterweight Welterweight

Boxing career
- Reach: 71 in (180 cm)
- Stance: Orthodox

Boxing record
- Total fights: 21
- Wins: 21
- Win by KO: 13
- Losses: 0
- Draws: 0
- No contests: 0
Medal record
World Amateur Championships
Silver medal – second place	2009 Milan	Light Welterweight
US National Championships
Gold medal – first place	2009 Denver	Light Welterweight

Jesús Francisco "Frankie" Gómez (born February 4, 1992) is an American former professional boxer. In 2010, Gómez signed with Oscar De La Hoya's company Golden Boy Promotions. Frankie was trained by five-time Trainer of the Year Freddie Roach.

== Amateur career ==
Gomez began boxing as an 8-year old and had an outstanding amateur record of 120–8. In 2007 he took the Junior Olympic National Championship and Gold at the Cadet World Championships in Baku, Azerbaijan. Gómez won the U-17 2008 Cadet World Championships in the Light Welterweight division. In 2009 he became the U.S.A. Amateur National Champion at age 17 beating National Golden Gloves winner José Benavidez of Phoenix. At the 2009 World Amateur Boxing Championships he went on to win a silver medal after losing to Olympic bronze medalist Roniel Iglesias.

== Professional career ==
Considered America's premiere amateur boxer when he turned Pro, Oscar De La Hoya said of Francisco "I've been watching his career closely for years, and Gómez is one of the best amateur boxers I've seen in a long time. He's (Gómez) a true blue chip prospect, and he has all the tools to become a world champion and a star in this game."

Gomez won his pro debut against veteran Clayvonne Howard by 3rd-round TKO. His third TKO victim was the Nigerian Akeem Akinbode, the fight took place on FSN's Fight Night Club.

In his first fight with trainer Abel Sanchez, Gómez beat the veteran Jason Davis by first round K.O.

In July 2011, Gomez beat Khadaphi Proctor; the bout was televised on TeleFutura.

In 2012, Gomez began training with famed boxing trainer Freddie Roach. After several victories, Gomez faced his biggest opponent yet in veteran Mauricio Herrera on the undercard of Canelo Álvarez vs. Amir Khan in May 2016. Gomez put on a dominant performance, winning all 10 rounds on all 3 judges' scorecards.

== Inactivity ==
In July 2016, Freddie Roach told BoxingScene.com that he had not seen Gomez in the gym for two months. In January 2017, Roach stated that he had not seen Frankie Gomez since early fall of 2016. Gomez has not fought since 2016, and is listed as "inactive" on BoxRec.

== Professional boxing record ==
21 Wins (13 knockouts), 0 Losses, 0 Draws
Res.	Record	Opponent	Type	Rd., Time	Date	Location	Notes
Win	21-0-0	(United States) Mauricio Herrera	UD	10	2016-05-07	(United States) T-Mobile Arena, Las Vegas, Nevada, U.S.	
Win	20-0-0	(Mexico) Silverio Ortiz	UD	10	2016-02-05	(United States) Fantasy Springs Casino, Indio, California, U.S.	
Win	19-0-0	(Mexico) Jorge Silva	UD	10	2015-10-23	(United States) Fantasy Springs Casino, Indio, California, U.S.	
Win	18-0-0	(United States) Vernon Paris	UD	10	2014-07-25	(United States) Fantasy Springs Casino, Indio, California, U.S.	
Win	17-0-0	(Puerto Rico) Orlando Vazquez	KO	2 (10), 1:54	2014-04-26	(United States) StubHub Center, Carson, California, U.S.	
Win	16-0-0	(Ghana) Prince Doku Jr.	TKO	1 (10), 1:56	2013-12-14	Arena Quequi, Playa del Carmen, Quintana Roo, Mexico	
Win	15-0-0	(United States) Lanard Lane	UD	10	2013-02-02	(United States) Cosmopolitan of Las Vegas, Las Vegas, Nevada, U.S.	
Win	14-0-0	(Mexico) Pavel Miranda	KO	1 (8), 0:48	2012-12-15	(United States) Sports Arena, Los Angeles, California, U.S.	
Win	13-0-0	(Mexico) Manuel Leyva	TKO	3 (8), 1:15	2012-11-03	(United States) The Phoenix Club, Anaheim, California, U.S.	
Win	12-0-0	(United States) James Hope	KO	3 (6), 0:53	2011-12-03	(United States) Honda Center, Anaheim, California, U.S.	
Win	11-0-0	(Mexico) Adrían Granados	MD	8	2011-08-26	(United States) UIC Pavilion, Chicago, Illinois, U.S.	
Win	10-0-0	(United States) Khadaphi Proctor	TKO	4 (8), (2:25)	2011-07-01	(United States) Fantasy Springs Casino, Indio, California, U.S.	
Win	9-0-0	(United States) Jason Davis	KO	1 (6), (0:25)	2011-04-28	(United States) Club Nokia, Los Angeles, California, U.S.	
Win	8-0-0	(Mexico) Jose Alfredo Lugo	UD	6	2011-01-14	(United States) Fantasy Springs Casino, Indio, California, U.S.	
Win	7-0-0	(Mexico) Ramón Montaño	UD	6	2010-10-15	(United States) Springs Resort Casino, Indio, California, U.S.	
Win	6-0-0	(United States) Ricardo Calzada	KO	3 (6), (1:06)	2010-09-18	(United States) Staples Center, Los Angeles, California, U.S.	
Win	5-0-0	(United States) Ronnie Peterson	KO	1 (6), (2:14)	2010-07-31	(United States) Mandalay Bay, Las Vegas, Nevada, U.S.	
Win	4-0-0	(Mexico) Jaime Orrantia	TKO	1 (4), (2:34)	2010-06-24	(United States) Club Nokia, Los Angeles, California, U.S.	
Win	3-0-0	(Nigeria) Akeem Akinbode	TKO	1 (4), (0:46)	2010-05-27	(United States) Club Nokia, Los Angeles, California, U.S.	
Win	2-0-0	(United States) Ricardo Malfavon	TKO	2 (4), (1:06)	2010-04-30	(United States) Tropicana Hotel & Casino, Las Vegas, Nevada, U.S.	
Win	1-0-0	(United States) Clayvonne Howard	TKO	3 (4), (2:45)	2010-04-03	(United States) Mandalay Bay, Las Vegas, Nevada, U.S.	
