= Krzysztof Rogowski (boxer) =

Polish boxer

Krzysztof „Roguś” Rogowski
Personal information
- Nationality: Poland
- Born: 25 July 1980 (age 46) Poznań, Poland

Sport
- Sport: Boxing
- Weight class: Featherweight
Medal record
Bronze medal – third place	2006 Pécs	Bantamweight

Krzysztof Rogowski (born 25 July 1980) is a Polish featherweight professional boxer. He won a bronze medal at the 2006 European Union Championships.
