= Dario Vangeli =

Italian boxer

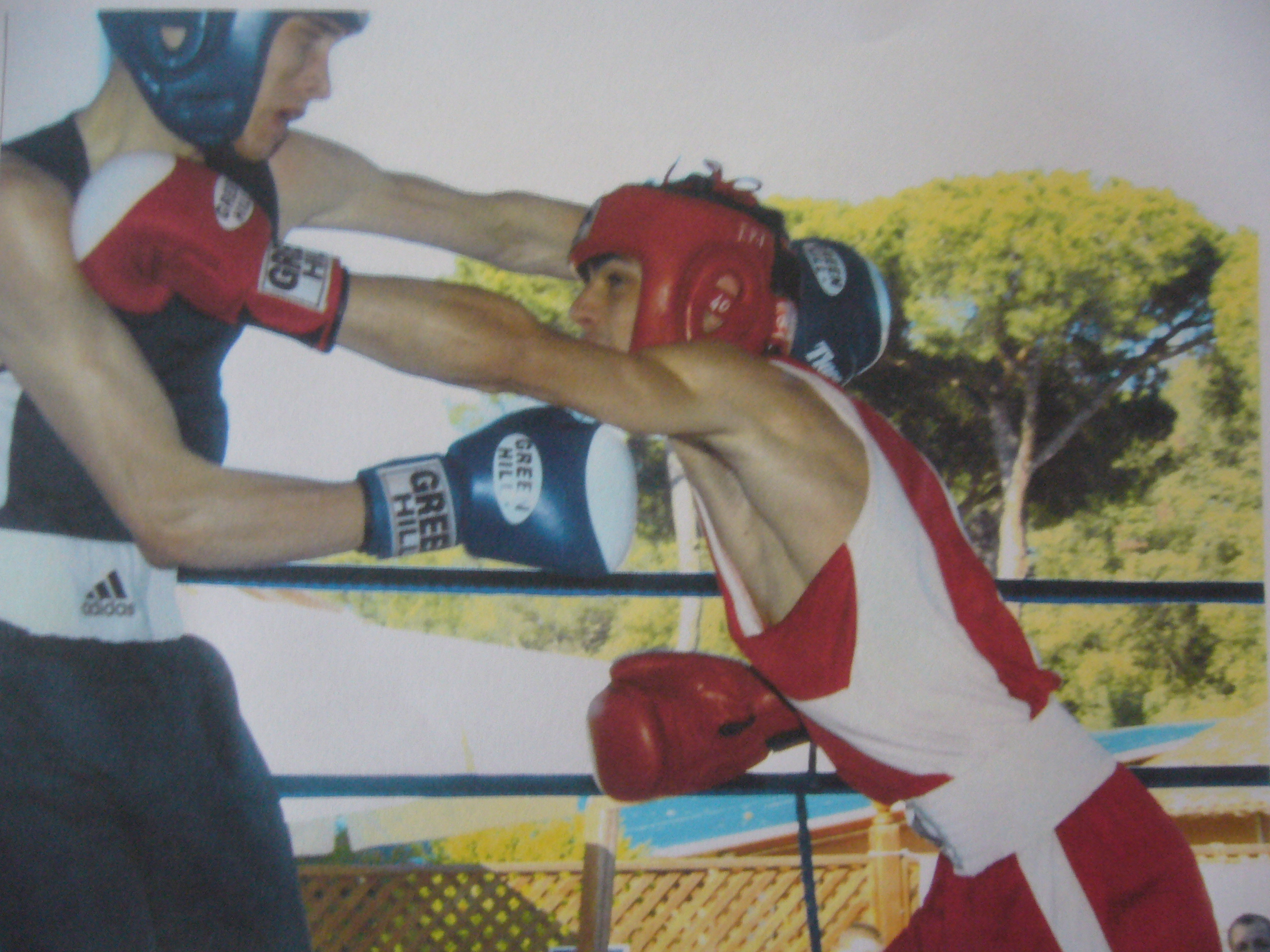
- Dario Vangeli (right)

Personal information
- Born: Dario Leonardo Vangeli; January 3, 1988 (age 38) Copertino, Italy
- Weight: 64 kg (141 lb)

Sport
- Sport: Boxing
- Weight class: Light welterweight
- Club: Fiamme Oro (2008-)

Dario Vangeli (born 3 January 1988) is an Italian male boxer twice world champion, in 2011 and 2015, at the World Police and Fire Games.
