= Elias Pavlidis =

Greek boxer

Personal information
- Full name: Ηλίας Παυλίδης
- Nationality: Greek
- Born: May 4, 1978 (age 48) Yekaterinburg, Sverdlovsk
- Height: 1.81 m (5 ft 11 in)
- Weight: 91 kg (201 lb)

Sport
- Sport: Boxing
- Weight class: Heavyweight
- Club: PAOK, Thessaloniki
Medal record
European Union Amateur Boxing Championships
Gold medal – first place	2007 Dublin	Heavyweight
Gold medal – first place	2008 Cetniewo	Heavyweight

Elias Pavlidis (born May 4, 1978, in Yekaterinburg, Sverdlovsk), sometimes written Helias or Ilias Pavlidis, is a Greek amateur boxer best known to compete at the Athens Olympics 2004. He was born in Russia.

== Career ==
At the 2003 World Championships, he lost his first bout in the men's light-heavyweight division to eventual winner Evgeny Makarenko from Russia.

At the 2004 Summer Olympics in Athens, he defeated Ali Ismayilov, but was stopped on cuts in the quarterfinal by Egyptian Ahmed Ismail when he was leading 18–12 in the third round. The Egyptian boxer hit Pavlidis with his elbow at the nose, but the referee didn't disqualify him. Prior to the Athens Games he won the 2004 Acropolis Boxing Cup in Athens, Greece by defeating Kazakhstan's Beibut Shumenov in the final of the light heavyweight division.

He went up a division to Heavyweight 201 lbs limit in 2007 and was more successful winning the 2007 EU boxing championships where he defeated future world champion Clemente Russo in the final 13:8.

At the World Championships, he was defeated by John M'Bumba.

In Beijing, he lost his second bout to Osmay Acosta.
