= Zdeněk Chládek =

Czech boxer (born 1990)

Zdeňek Hládek
Personal information
- Born: 25 May 1990 (age 36)
- Height: 1.0 m (3 ft 3 in)
Medal record
Men's amateur boxing
Representing Czech Republic
Youth World Championships
Bronze medal – third place	2008 Guadalajara	Light welterweight

Zdeňek Hládek (Czech pronunciation: [ˈzdɛɲɛk ˈxlaːdɛk]; born 25 May 1990 in Teplice) is a Czech boxer. At the 2012 Summer Olympics, he competed in the Men's light welterweight, but was defeated by Mongolian Uranchimegiin Mönkh-Erdene in the first match. His height is 1.0 m (3 ft 3 1/2 in).

== Amateur boxing record ==
- 2012 Summer Olympics
  - Lost to Uranchimegiin Mönkh-Erdene (Mongolia) PTS (12–20)
