= Yunieski Gonzalez =

Cuban boxer (born 1985)

Yuniesky Gonzalez
Personal information
- Born: Yuniesky Gonzalez; 5 July 1985 (age 41) Pinar del Río, Cuba
- Height: 5 ft 11 in (180 cm)
- Weight: Light heavyweight

Boxing career
- Stance: Orthodox

Boxing record
- Total fights: 27
- Wins: 21
- Win by KO: 17
- Losses: 4
- Draws: 0

Yuniesky Gonzalez (born 5 July 1985) is a Cuban boxer who fights in the light heavyweight division. Gonzalez amassed a record of 345–27 while fighting for the Cuban amateur team before moving to Miami in 2010. He made his professional debut later that year with a first round knock-out victory against Ramon Adorno.

Gonzalez suffered his first defeat in July 2015 after a controversial points loss to Jean Pascal.

On 4 August 2015 he was ranked 9th Light Heavyweight by RING magazine.

== Professional boxing record ==
25 fights	21 wins	4 losses
By knockout	17	2
By decision	4	2

No.	Result	Record	Opponent	Type	Round, time	Date	Location	Notes
25	Loss	21–4	(Mexico) Gilberto Ramírez	TKO	10 (12), 1:23	18 December 2021	(United States) AT&T Center, San Antonio, Texas, US	
24	Win	21–3	(United States) Tommy Karpency	KO	2 (10), 2:03	14 September 2021	(United States) Seminole Hard Rock Hotel & Casino, Hollywood, Florida, US	
23	Win	20–3	(Colombia) Alex Theran	KO	2 (10), 2:51	4 December 2020	(United States) InterContinental Miami, Miami, Florida, US	Won WBA Fedelatin light heavyweight title
22	Win	19–3	(Mexico) Guillermo Romero	TKO	1 (10), 1:53	30 October 2020	Grupo Sipse, Mérida, Yucatán, Mexico	
21	Loss	18–3	(Ukraine) Oleksandr Gvozdyk	TKO	3 (10), 2:55	8 April 2017	(United States) MGM National Harbor, Oxon Hill, Maryland, US	For NABF and vacant WBO-NABO light heavyweight titles
20	Win	18–2	(Ghana) Maxwell Amponsah	TKO	1 (10), 2:02	11 November 2016	(United States) Miami Airport Convention Center, Miami, Florida, USA	
19	Win	17–2	(Brazil) Jackson Junior	TKO	1 (10), 2:35	6 August 2016	(United States) Miami Airport Convention Center, Miami, Florida, USA	
18	Loss	16–2	(Ukraine) Vyacheslav Shabranskyy	MD	10	19 December 2015	(United States) Turning Stone Resort & Casino, Verona, New York, US	
17	Loss	16–1	(Canada) Jean Pascal	UD	10	25 July 2015	(United States) Mandalay Bay Events Center, Paradise, Nevada, US	
16	Win	16–0	(United States) Brad Austin	TKO	3 (8), 1:27	28 March 2015	(United States) Belle of Baton Rouge Casino, Baton Rouge, Louisiana, US	
15	Win	15–0	(Puerto Rico) Edgar Perez	TKO	1 (10), 3:00	5 September 2014	(United States) Parsippany PAL, Parsippany, New Jersey, US	
14	Win	14–0	(Colombia) Jaison Palomeque	TKO	1 (6), 1:47	1 May 2014	(United States) Hialeah Park Race Track, Hialeah, Florida, US	
13	Win	13–0	(Ecuador) Jinner Guerrero	KO	8 (10), 1:36	12 November 2013	(United States) Seminole Hard Rock Hotel and Casino, Hollywood, Florida, US	
12	Win	12–0	(Dominican Republic) Emilio Calletano	KO	7 (8), 1:39	15 June 2013	Coliseo Pedro Julio Nolasco, La Romana, Dominican Republic	
11	Win	11–0	(United States) Rowland Bryant	KO	8 (10), 1:19	15 March 2013	(United States) Seminole Hard Rock Hotel and Casino, Hollywood, Florida, US	
10	Win	10–0	(Ghana) Daniel Adotey Allotey	KO	2 (10), 1:14	9 November 2012	(United States) A La Carte Event Pavilion, Tampa, Florida, US	
9	Win	9–0	(The Bahamas) Jermain Mackey	UD	10	18 August 2012	(United States) Doubletree Miamimart Hotel, Miami, Florida, US	
8	Win	8–0	(United States) Carlos Reyes	TKO	1 (6), 1:38	11 May 2012	(United States) Texas Station Casino, Paradise, Nevada, US	
7	Win	7–0	(United States) Marvin Jones	TKO	2 (6), 1:17	30 March 2012	(United States) DoubleTree Westshore Hotel, Tampa, Florida, US	
6	Win	6–0	(United States) Terrance Smith	MD	6	7 January 2012	(United States) Westin Diplomat Resort, Hollywood, Florida, US	
5	Win	5–0	(United States) Grover Young	UD	6	9 July 2011	(United States) Seminole Hard Rock Hotel & Casino Hollywood, Hollywood, Florida, US	
4	Win	4–0	(United States) Reggie Pena	UD	6	11 March 2011	(United States) Magic City Casino, Miami, Florida, US	
3	Win	3–0	(United States) Chris Kahn	KO	2 (4), 2:30	11 February 2011	(United States) Magic City Casino, Miami, Florida, US	
2	Win	2–0	(United States) Kentrell Claiborne	TKO	2 (4), 1:50	14 January 2011	(United States) Magic City Casino, Miami, Florida, US	
1	Win	1–0	(Puerto Rico) Ramon Adorno	KO	1 (4), 0:53	3 December 2010	(United States) Magic City Casino, Miami, Florida, US	Professional debut
