= Gyula Káté =

Hungarian boxer (born 1982)

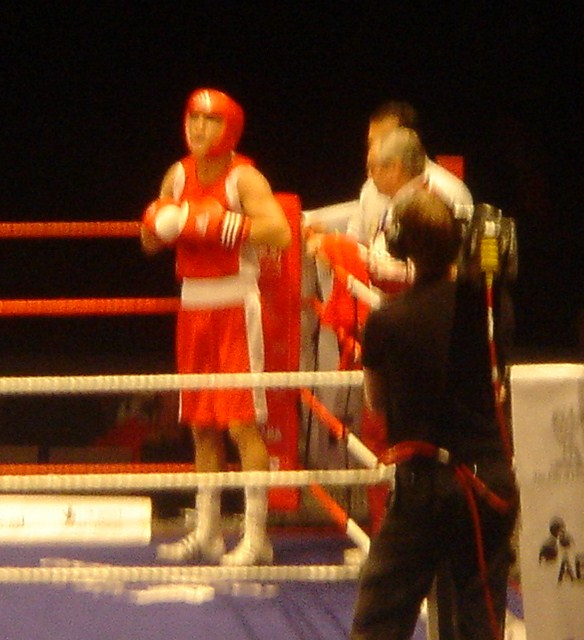
- Gyula Káté at Liverpool 2008
Medal record
Representing Hungary
Men's Boxing
World Amateur Championships
| Bronze medal – third place | 2003 Bangkok | Lightweight |
| Bronze medal – third place | 2009 Milan | Light Welterweight |
World University Championships
| Gold medal – first place | 2004 Antalya | Light Welterweight |
European Amateur Championships
| Silver medal – second place | 2008 Liverpool | Light Welterweight |
| Silver medal – second place | 2010 Moscow | Light Welterweight |
| Bronze medal – third place | 2004 Pula | Lightweight |
| Bronze medal – third place | 2006 Plovdid | Light Welterweight |
EU Amateur Championships
| Gold medal – first place | 2005 Cagliari | Light Welterweight |
| Gold medal – first place | 2006 Pécs | Light Welterweight |
| Silver medal – second place | 2008 Cetniewo | Light Welterweight |
| Silver medal – second place | 2009 Odense | Light Welterweight |
| Bronze medal – third place | 2007 Dublin | Light Welterweight |

Gyula Káté (born February 3, 1982) is a Hungarian amateur boxer best known for winning two bronze medals at European Championships and one at the World Championships.

== Career ==
In 2000 he won the World Junior Championships against Boris Georgiev.

At the 2003 World Championships he lost in the semifinal to Mario Kindelan and won lightweight bronze.

In 2004 he won lightweight bronze at the European Championships. At the Olympics he lost his first match against Jong Sub-Baik. At the 2004 World University Boxing Championships he won the 64 kg title, the start of his competing at junior welterweight.

At the 2007 World Championships he beat Myke Carvalho but lost early to Gennadiy Kovalev.

In 2006 he won a bronze medal at the European Amateur Boxing Championships after he was beaten in the semifinals by Russia's Oleg Komissarov.

He qualified for the 2008 Olympics at Light-welterweight by beating Lithuanian boxer Egidijus Kavaliauskas in the semifinal of a European qualifying tournament. At the 2008 Olympics he lost his first bout 5:9 to Irish Johnny Joyce.

At the 2012 Summer Olympics, he lost to Vincenzo Mangiacapre.
