= Samuel Molina (boxer) =

Spanish professional boxer (born 1998)

Personal information
- Born: Samuel Molina Vivar; 29 November 1998 (age 27) Málaga, Spain
- Height: 175 cm (5 ft 9 in)
- Weight: Lightweight, Welterweight

Boxing career

Boxing record
- Total fights: 38
- Wins: 32
- Win by KO: 15
- Losses: 4
- Draws: 1
- No contests: 1

Samuel Molina Vivar (born 29 November 1998) is a Spanish professional boxer. He held the European welterweight title from October 2024 to November 2025.

== Professional boxing record ==
39 fights	32 wins	5 losses
By knockout	15	1
By decision	17	4
Draws	1	
No contests	1	

No.	Result	Record	Opponent	Type	Round, time	Date	Location	Notes
38	Loss	32–4–1 (1)	Egidijus Kavaliauskas	MD	12	28 Nov 2025	Zalgiris Arena, Kaunas, Lithuania	Lost European welterweight title
37	Draw	32–3–1 (1)	Anas Messaoudi	MD	12	2 Aug 2025	Plaza de toros de La Malagueta, Málaga, Spain	Retained European welterweight title
36	Win	32–3 (1)	Sandy Messaoud	UD	12	15 Feb 2025	Palacio de Deportes José María Martín Carpena, Málaga, Spain	Retained European welterweight title; Won WBC International welterweight title
35	Win	31–3 (1)	Alejandro Meneses	UD	8	7 Dec 2024	Club Saga Heredia, Málaga, Spain	
34	Win	30–3 (1)	Jordy Weiss	MD	12	19 Oct 2024	Espace Mayenne, Laval, France	Won European welterweight title
33	Win	29–3 (1)	Alvaro Godoy	TKO	9 (10)	10 Aug 2024	Balneario de los Baños del Carmen, Málaga, Spain	
32	Win	28–3 (1)	Jerobe Santana	TKO	10 (10)	4 May 2024	Polideportivo de Carranque, Málaga, Spain	Won vacant Spanish welterweight
31	Win	27–3 (1)	Les Byfield	TKO	1 (6)	9 Dec 2023	Club Saga Heredia, Málaga, Spain	
30	Win	26–3 (1)	Dorian Maidana	TKO	6 (10)	5 Aug 2023	Hotel Holiday World, Benalmádena, Spain	Won vacant IBF Youth welterweight title
29	Loss	25–3 (1)	Franck Petitjean	MD	12	10 Jun 2023	Gymnase Didot, Paris, France	For vacant European light-welterweight title
28	Win	25–2 (1)	Rikar Urrutia	SD	10	29 Apr 2023	WiZink Center, Madrid, Spain	Retained Spanish light-welterweight title
27	Win	24–2 (1)	Armando Ramirez Almanza	PTS	8	11 Mar 2023	Club Saga Heredia, Málaga, Spain	
26	Win	23–2 (1)	Jon Fernandez	UD	10	3 Dec 2022	Polideportivo de Carranque, Málaga, Spain	Won Spanish light-welterweight title
25	Win	22–2 (1)	Ramiro Blanco	UD	6	8 Oct 2022	Club Saga Heredia, Málaga, Spain	
24	Win	21–2 (1)	Viorel Simion	RTD	4 (6), 3:00	1 Oct 2022	Plaza de Toros, Aranjuez, Spain	
23	Win	20–2 (1)	Ramiro Blanco	UD	6	2 Jul 2022	Club Saga Heredia, Málaga, Spain	
22	Loss	19–2 (1)	Francesco Patera	MD	10	16 Apr 2022	Hall Omnisport de la Préalle, Herstal, Belgium	For vacant WBO Global lightweight title
21	Win	19–1 (1)	Victor Julio	KO	5 (8)	12 Feb 2022	Club Saga Heredia, Málaga, Spain	
20	Win	18–1 (1)	Dionis Martinez	TKO	4 (4)	4 Dec 2011	Club Saga Heredia, Málaga, Spain	
19	Win	17–1 (1)	Saul Corral	KO	3 (8)	6 Nov 2021	Club Saga Heredia, Málaga, Spain	
18	Loss	16–1 (1)	Artem Harutyunyan	KO	5 (10), 2:31	25 Sep 2021	Universum Gym, Hamburg, Germany	For vacant WBC International lightweight title
17	Win	16–0 (1)	Viorel Simion	UD	8	8 May 2021	Club Saga Heredia, Málaga, Spain	
16	Win	15–0 (1)	Salvador Baron	TKO	2 (8)	20 Dec 2020	Club Saga Heredia, Málaga, Spain	
15	Win	14–0 (1)	Ruben Garcia	KO	2 (8)	8 Aug 2020	Plaza de Toros de Puerto Banus, Marbella, Spain	
14	NC	13–0 (1)	Ivan Tomas	NC	6 (10), 2:12	12 Dec 2019	Pabellón de la Vall d'Hebron, Barcelona, Spain	Spanish lightweight title at stake; Originally TKO win by Molina, overturned due being positive for a banned substance
13	Win	13–0	Brian Pelaez	SD	8	28 Sep 2019	Bilbao Arena, Bilbao, Spain	
12	Win	12–0	Carlos Perez	TKO	7 (10)	3 Aug 2019	Opium Beach Club Marbella, Marbella, Spain	Won vacant Spanish lightweight title
11	Win	11–0	Alexander Muñoz	KO	1 (8), 2:50	6 Jul 2019	Club Saga Heredia, Málaga, Spain	
10	Win	10–0	Ezequiel Victor Fernandez	UD	10	18 May 2019	Club Saga Heredia, Málaga	Won inaugural IBO IberoAmerican lightweight title
9	Win	9–0	Volodymyr Matviichuk	PTS	8	9 Feb 2019	Club Saga Heredia, Málaga, Spain	
8	Win	8–0	Artem Haroyan	PTS	8	9 Jun 2018	Club Saga Heredia, Málaga, Spain	
7	Win	7–0	Giuseppe Carafa	UD	8	11 May 2018	Polideportivo Ciudad Jardín, Málaga, Spain	
6	Win	6–0	Fabrizio Trotta	RTD	3 (6), 3:00	24 Feb 2018	Club Saga Heredia, Málaga, Spain	
5	Win	5–0	Franklin Varela	PTS	6	13 Jan 2018	Club Saga Heredia, Málaga, Spain	
4	Win	4–0	Lester Cantillano	KO	1 (4)	2 Dec 2017	Club Saga Heredia, Málaga, Spain	
3	Win	3–0	Kevin Baldospino	PTS	6	21 Oct 2017	Palacio de Deportes José María Martín Carpena, Málaga, Spain	
2	Win	2–0	Marian Marius Istrate	PTS	4	16 Sep 2017	Club Saga Heredia, Málaga, Spain	
1	Win	1–0	Ignasi Caballero	TKO	2 (6)	5 Aug 2017	Palacio de Deportes José María Martín Carpena, Málaga, Spain	
