= Elchin Alizade =

Azerbaijani boxer (born 1986)

Personal information
- Full name: Elçin Əlizadə
- Nationality: Azerbaijani
- Born: 2 January 1986 (age 40) Gandja, Azerbaijan
- Height: 1.90 m (6 ft 3 in)
- Weight: 91 kg (201 lb)

Sport
- Sport: Boxing
- Weight class: Heavyweight
Medal record
World Amateur Championships
Silver medal – second place	2005 Mianyang	Heavyweight
European Amateur Championships
Bronze medal – third place	2006 Plovdiv	Heavyweight

Elchin Alizade (Azerbaijani: Elçin Əlizadə) (born 2 January 1986) is an Azerbaijani amateur boxer best known for winning silver at the 2005 World championships at heavyweight 201 lbs limit.

== Career ==
In 2001 he won silver against Ismail Sillakh at 67 kg, in 2002 he won the bronze medal at 71 kg at the U17 (cadets) World Championships.

At junior level he won two more bronzes at 201 lbs/91 kg, at the 2004 junior world championships and at the 2005 junior European championships where he lost the semifinal to Sergey Kalchugin. He won silver when he lost the 2004 World University Boxing Championships final to Vyacheslav Glazkov.

In 2005 he injured himself at the senior world championships in his semifinal victory and lost the final by walkover against Aleksandr Alekseyev. In December he won a fight against Eric Fields at a USA vs. Azerbaijan Dual in Illinois by RSCO.

In 2006 at the European Championships he KOd Olympic silver medallist Viktar Zuyev in the first round but was beaten inside the distance by hard-punching Ukrainian surprise winner Denis Poyatsika.

At the 10th Anwar Chowdhry Cup in final bout he defeated Dmitriy Gotfrid of Kazakhstan (27:07) and won a gold medal.

At the World Cup 2006 he defeated Adam Willett (USA) 19:5, Zhenis Taumurinov (KZK) 18:13, but lost at semifinal to Cuban Osmay Acosta and won bronze medal.

2007 at the 1. Great Silk Road Boxing Tournament he defeated Iago Kiladze (22:9), Azer Mamadov (23:19), Yousef Abdelghani (20:16) and won a gold medal.

At the 2007 World Amateur Boxing Championships he won the rematch on clearly points against Poyatsika but lost against Russian favorite Rakhim Chakhkeiv.

At the Olympic qualifiers he was upset twice by Oleksandr Usyk and Milorad Gajovic and did not qualify.
