= Egidijus Kavaliauskas =

Lithuanian boxer (born 1988)

Personal information
- Nickname: Mean Machine
- Born: June 29, 1988 (age 38) Kaunas, Lithuania
- Height: 5 ft 9 in (175 cm)
- Weight: Welterweight

Boxing career
- Reach: 71 in (180 cm)
- Stance: Orthodox

Boxing record
- Total fights: 29
- Wins: 25
- Win by KO: 19
- Losses: 3
- Draws: 1
Medal record
Men's amateur boxing
Representing Lithuania
World Championships
| Bronze medal – third place | 2011 Baku | Welterweight |

Egidijus Kavaliauskas (born June 29, 1988) is a Lithuanian professional boxer. He held the European welterweight title from November 2025 to January 2026.

As an amateur, he represented Lithuania at the 2008 and 2012 Olympic Games, and won a bronze medal at the 2011 World Championships.

== Biography ==
Kavaliauskas participated in 2008 at the Summer Olympics, but lost his first fight to bronze-winning Frenchman Alexis Vastine. In 2009 the boxer successfully started in the world championship and was among the eight strongest. In 2011 He won a gold medal in the Lithuanian championship. In the same year, Kavaliauskas participated in the world championship, where he reached the semifinals. In the finals competition, the athlete suffered a hand injury and won a bronze medal for not finishing the fight. Selected as the best of 2011 Lithuanian boxer.

== Amateur career ==
- 2004 – Cadet European Champs (Saratov, RUS) 3rd place – 52 kg.
- 2005 – Cadet European Champs (Siófok, HUN) 3rd place – 54 kg.
- 2005 – Lithuania Junior National Champs 3rd place – 54 kg.
- 2006 – Danas Pozniakas Junior Tournament (Vilnius, LTU) 1st place – 60 kg.
- 2006 – Lithuania Senior National Champs 2nd place – 60 kg.
- 2006 – Brandenburg Junior Tournament (Frankfurt an der Oder, GER) 3rd place – 60 kg.
- 2007 – Algirdas Socikas Tournament (Kaunas, LTU) 1st place – 60 kg.
- 2007 – Grand Prix Ostrava (Ostrava, CZE) 3rd place – 64 kg.
- 2007 – Slovak Grand Prix (Vranov nad Topľou, SVK) 1st place – 69 kg.
- 2008 – Bocskai Tournament (Debrecen, HUN) 3rd place – 64 kg Lost to Alexis Vastine (FRA) 13:10 in the semifinal; Won against Harun Sipahi (GER) 16:6 in the quarterfinal; Won against Tamas Balogh (HUN) RSC 4th round in the first preliminary round.
- 2008 – Lithuania Senior National Champs 1st place.
- 2008 – 1st European Olympic Qualification Tournament (Pescara, ITA) 3rd place – 64 kg Lost to Gyula Kate (HUN) 18:10 in the semifinal; Won against Boris Katalinic (CRO) 13:4 in the quarterfinal; Won against Aslanbek Kozayev (BLR) 17:9 in the second round; Won against Jussi Koivula (FIN) 23:5 in the first round.
- 2008 – 2nd European Olympic Qualification Tournament (Athens, GRE) 2nd place – 64 kg Lost to John Joe Joyce (IRL) RSCI 2nd round in the final; Won against Boris Katalinic (CRO) 11:5 in the semifinal; Won against Levan Gvamichava (GEO) 17:8 in the quarterfinal; Won against Anatolie Andreev (MLD) 19:3 in the second round; Won against Carmine Cirillo (ITA) 4:1 in the first round.
- 2008 – Grand Prix Ostrava (Ostrava, CZE) 3rd place – 64 kg Lost to Roniel Iglesias (CUB) AB 2nd round in the semifinal.
- 2009 – Chemistry Cup (Halle, GER) 2nd place – 64 kg.
- 2009 – Lithuania Senior National Champs 1st place – 64 kg.
- 2009 – Algirdas Socikas Tournament (Kaunas, LTU) 3rd place – 64 kg Lost to Vazgen Safaryants (BLR) 4:3 in the semifinal.
- 2010 – Algirdas Socikas Tournament (Kaunas, LTU) 1st place – 69 kg.
- 2010 – Amber Gloves Tournament (Kaliningrad, RUS) 1st place – 69 kg.
- 2011 – Grand Prix Usti nad Labem (Usti nad Labem, CZE) 1st place – 69 kg Won against Konstantin Snigour (ISR) 1:0 in the final; Won against Robert Bilik (CZE) 2:1 in the semifinal; Won against Aleksey Galetich (BLR) 1:0 in the quarterfinal; Won against Jesse Ross (AUS) 7:0 in the first preliminary round.
- 2011 – Feliks Stamm Tournament (Warsaw, POL) 1st place – 69 kg Won against Abdulkadir Koroglu (TUR) 12:5 in the final; Won against Maksim Chudakov (RUS) RSCI 3rd round in the semifinal; Won against Tomasz Kot (POL) 8:4 in the quarterfinal.
- 2011 – Lithuanian National Championships 1st place – 69 kg.
- 2011 – Liventsev Memorial Tournament (Minsk, BLR) 2nd place – 69 kg.
- 2011 – AIBA World Championships (Baku, AZE) 3rd place – 69 kg Lost to Serik Sapiyev (KAZ) AB 2nd round in the semi-final; Won against Fred Evans (WAL) RSCH 2nd round in the quarter-final; Won against Roy Sheahan (IRL) 11:7 in the third preliminary round; Won against Robert Bilik (CZE) 15:4 in the second preliminary round; Won against Maimaitituersun Qiong (CHN) 20:16 in the first preliminary round.

== Professional career ==
=== Kavaliauskas vs. Crawford ===
On 14 December 2019, Kavaliauskas faced WBO welterweight champion Terence Crawford. Kavaliauskas started off the fight well, appearing to score a knockdown of Crawford in the third round but the referee ruled it a slip. However, Crawford improved in the following rounds and managed to finish Kavaliauskas in the ninth round.

=== Kavaliauskas vs. Zewski ===
In his next bout, Kavaliauskas faced Mikael Zewski, who was ranked #7 by the IBF and the WBO as well as #13 by the WBC. Kavaliauskas beat Zewski by technical knockout in the 8th round.

=== Kavaliauskas vs. Ortiz Jr ===
In his next fight, Kavaliauskas faced Vergil Ortiz Jr. Ortiz Jr was ranked #9 by The Ring, #1 by the WBO, #4 by the WBC and #15 by the IBF at welterweight. Ortiz Jr beat Kavaliauskas by technical knockout in the 8th round.

=== Kavaliauskas vs. Molina ===
Kavaliauskas beat Samuel Molina by majority decision to win the European welterweight title at Zalgiris Arena, Kaunas, Lithuania, on 28 November 2025.

Without making any defenses, Kavaliauskas vacated the title in January 2026.

== Professional boxing record ==
| 28 fights | 24 wins | 3 losses |
|---|---|---|
| By knockout | 19 | 2 |
| By decision | 5 | 1 |
| Draws | 1 | |

| No. | Result | Record | Opponent | Type | Round, time | Date | Location | Notes |
|---|---|---|---|---|---|---|---|---|
| 29 | Win | 25–3–1 | Samuel Molina | MD | 12 | Nov 28, 2025 | Zalgiris Arena, Kaunas, Lithuania | Won European welterweight title |
| 28 | Loss | 24–3–1 | Souleymane Cissokho | UD | 12 | May 10, 2025 | Centre de Conférence de Sipopo, Malabo, Equatorial Guinea | For WBC Silver welterweight title |
| 27 | Win | 24–2–1 | Jose Marruffo | KO | 3 (8), 2:10 | Dec 14, 2023 | The Hangar, Costa Mesa, California, U.S. | |
| 26 | Win | 23–2–1 | Mykal Fox | UD | 10 | Oct 8, 2022 | Dignity Health Sports Park, Carson, California, U.S. | |
| 25 | Loss | 22–2–1 | Vergil Ortiz Jr. | TKO | 8 (12), 2:59 | Aug 14, 2021 | Ford Center at The Star, Frisco, Texas, U.S. | For WBO International welterweight title |
| 24 | Win | 22–1–1 | Mikaël Zewski | TKO | 8 (10), 0:07 | Sep 12, 2020 | MGM Grand Conference Center, Paradise, Nevada, U.S. | Won vacant WBC Continental Americas welterweight title |
| 23 | Loss | 21–1–1 | Terence Crawford | TKO | 9 (12), 0:44 | Dec 14, 2019 | Madison Square Garden, New York City, New York, U.S. | For WBO welterweight title |
| 22 | Draw | 21–0–1 | Ray Robinson | MD | 10 | Mar 30, 2019 | 2300 Arena, Philadelphia, Pennsylvania, U.S. | Retained WBC-NABF welterweight title |
| 21 | Win | 21–0 | Roberto Arriaza | KO | 3 (10), 3:00 | Nov 16, 2018 | Chesapeake Energy Arena, Oklahoma City, Oklahoma, U.S. | Retained WBC-NABF welterweight title; Won WBO Inter-Continental welterweight title |
| 20 | Win | 20–0 | Juan Carlos Abreu | UD | 10 | Jul 7, 2018 | Save Mart Center, Fresno, California, U.S. | Retained WBC-NABF welterweight title |
| 19 | Win | 19–0 | David Avanesyan | TKO | 6 (10), 1:55 | Feb 16, 2018 | Grand Sierra Resort, Reno, Nevada, U.S. | Retained WBC-NABF welterweight title |
| 18 | Win | 18–0 | Mahonri Montes | TKO | 7 (10), 0:34 | Sep 22, 2017 | Convention Center, Tucson, Arizona, U.S. | Won vacant WBC-NABF welterweight title |
| 17 | Win | 17–0 | Daniel Echeverria | KO | 7 (8), 1:19 | May 26, 2017 | UIC Pavilion, Chicago, Illinois, U.S. | |
| 16 | Win | 16–0 | Ramses Agaton | KO | 4 (8), 2:58 | Apr 8, 2017 | MGM National Harbor, Oxon Hill, Maryland, U.S. | |
| 15 | Win | 15–0 | Cameron Krael | UD | 8 | Oct 14, 2016 | Sportsmans Lodge, Los Angeles, California, U.S. | |
| 14 | Win | 14–0 | Jeremy Bryan | TKO | 3 (8), 1:08 | Jul 16, 2016 | Pioneer Event Center, Lancaster, California, U.S. | |
| 13 | Win | 13–0 | Deniz Ilbay | UD | 8 | Apr 9, 2016 | MGM Grand Garden Arena, Paradise, Nevada, U.S. | |
| 12 | Win | 12–0 | Prenice Brewer | KO | 2 (8), 1:24 | Feb 13, 2016 | Sportsmans Lodge, Los Angeles, California, U.S. | |
| 11 | Win | 11–0 | Pablo Munguia | KO | 2 (8), 1:02 | Dec 12, 2015 | Civic Auditorium, Glendale, California, U.S. | |
| 10 | Win | 10–0 | Jake Giuriceo | TKO | 1 (8), 1:00 | Nov 7, 2015 | Thomas & Mack Center, Paradise, Nevada, U.S. | |
| 9 | Win | 9–0 | Jamie Herrera | KO | 2 (8), 0:46 | Dec 13, 2014 | Cosmopolitan of Las Vegas, Paradise, Nevada, U.S. | |
| 8 | Win | 8–0 | Eduardo Flores | TKO | 1 (6), 2:51 | Sep 20, 2014 | Celebrity Theatre, Phoenix, Arizona, U.S. | |
| 7 | Win | 7–0 | Benjamin Whitaker | KO | 5 (6), 0:47 | Aug 9, 2014 | Civic Auditorium, Glendale, California, U.S. | |
| 6 | Win | 6–0 | Larry Ventus | TKO | 4 (6), 2:13 | Jun 14, 2014 | Bally's Atlantic City, Atlantic City, New Jersey, U.S. | |
| 5 | Win | 5–0 | James Harrison | TKO | 1 (6), 1:13 | Mar 29, 2014 | Texas Station, North Las Vegas, Nevada U.S. | |
| 4 | Win | 4–0 | Peter Haro | TKO | 2 (6), 0:57 | Oct 11, 2013 | Thomas & Mack Center, Paradise, Nevada, U.S. | |
| 3 | Win | 3–0 | Jason Thompson | TKO | 2 (4), 1:36 | Aug 17, 2013 | Davis Conference Center, Layton, Utah U.S. | |
| 2 | Win | 2–0 | Luis Borrego | TKO | 3 (4), 1:41 | Jun 8, 2013 | Hard Rock Hotel & Casino, Paradise, Nevada, U.S. | |
| 1 | Win | 1–0 | Eridanni Leon | UD | 4 | Mar 16, 2013 | Home Depot Center, Carson, California, U.S. | |

Sporting positions
Regional boxing titles
| Vacant Title last held by Konstantin Ponomarev | WBC–NABF welterweight champion 22 September 2017 – November 2019 | Vacant Title next held by Blair Cobbs |
| Preceded by Roberto Arriaza | WBO Inter-Continental welterweight champion 16 November 2018 – March 2019 | Vacant Title next held by Sergey Lipinets |
