= Deivi Julio =

Colombian boxer (born 1980)

Personal information
- Full name: Deivis Julio Blanco
- Born: April 12, 1980 (age 46)

Sport
- Sport: Boxing
- Weight class: Heavyweight
Medal record
Representing Colombia
Men's amateur boxing
Pan American Games
Silver medal – second place	2015 Toronto	Heavyweight
Central American and Caribbean Games
Gold medal – first place	2010 Mayagüez	Heavyweight
Silver medal – second place	2018 Barranquilla	Heavyweight
Bronze medal – third place	2014 Veracruz	Heavyweight
South American Games
Gold medal – first place	2014 Santiago	+91 kg
Gold medal – first place	2018 Cochabamba	Heavyweight

Deivi ("Deivis") Julio Blanco (born April 12, 1980) is a Colombian amateur boxer best known to qualify for the 2008 Summer Olympics in the Heavyweight (201 lbs limit) division.

== Career ==
At the PanAm Games 2007 the tall Julio ran into dominant Osmay Acosta early and lost 2:10. At the World Championships 2007 he suffered the ultimate humiliation when he was blitzed in a mere 15 seconds of round 1 by Elchin Alizade.

At the first Olympic qualifier he was edged out by Deontay Wilder 5:6 but when Wilder and Acosta both qualified the 26-year-old seized the opportunity at the second qualifier to defeat Alcivar Ayovi, Alexander Vellon and Hamilton Ventura to win the tournament. He lost his Olympic bout to John M'Bumba 5:11.

He won a silver medal in the heavyweight class at the 2015 Pan American Games.
