= Adam Willett =

American boxer

Adam Willett (born April 4, 1982) is an American boxer best known to represent his country at the 2005 world championships at 201 lbs. He currently freelances as a trainer/coach and security guard.

== Shooting ==
On April 7, 2010, Adam was critically injured during a shooting that is believed to be a botched robbery attempt. He was in the Miracle Plaza Shopping Center in Long Island, NY when he was shot in the abdomen.

Sporting positions
Preceded by Tony Grano	United States Amateur Heavyweight Champion; 2006	Succeeded by Deontay Wilder
