= Marcelo Cruz Utreras =

Ecuadorian neurologist and politician

Marcelo Cruz Utreras (born Quito 1943) is an Ecuadorian neurologist and politician. He graduated as a doctor from the Central University of Ecuador in 1969. Later he traveled to the United States to carry out his specialization as a neurologist in Boston. He graduated as a neurologist in the mid-1970s, when he also founded the first Neurology service of Ecuador at the Carlos Andrade Marín Hospital in Quito. He then went on to work with the research team of the National Polytechnic School and was part of the group of scientists who promoted the law of mandatory iodization of salt to combat endemic goiter and cretinism. In 1980, he worked with the NIH and the WHO to help to carry out the first neuroepidemiological study in Latin America.

Cruz's research showed that neurological disorders were more prevalent in developing countries than in industrialized countries. Specifically, in Ecuador, epilepsy was 3-4 times more frequent than in North America or Europe. With the support of the CDC, Cruz led a research team that found that the cause of this high prevalence of epilepsy was the invasion of the brain by the T. solium parasite. With Cruz's contributions, the Ecuadorian Ministry of Public Health undertook between 1988 and 1992 a national antiparasitic and health education campaign that, 20 years later, has been shown to have effectively controlled cerebral cysticercosis in the country.

In 1996, he joined the Ministry of Health under the government of Abdalá Bucaram. He was the vice-presidential nominee of the National Action Institutional Renovation Party (Prian) during the candidacy of Álvaro Noboa in 2002. The ticket was defeated in the second round by Lucio Gutiérrez. In September 2018 he was nominated for the consul of Ecuador in Spain.

In 1998 he was named an Honorary Member of the American Academy of Neurology. In 2004, for his scientific career based on community studies, he received the Vicente Rocafuerte Award for Scientific Merit from the National Congress. In 2008 he received the General Rumiñahui Award from the Provincial Council of Pichincha. In 2017 he was nominated Corresponding Member of the Ecuadorian Academy of Medicine. In 2018 he received the National Award Eugenio Espejo, the highest scientific award granted by the Republic of the Ecuador.
