= John M'Bumba =

French boxer

Medal record

Representing France

Men's Boxing

World Amateur Championships
Bronze medal – third place	Chicago 2007	Heavyweight
Bronze medal – third place	Milan 2009	Heavyweight

EU Amateur Championships
Gold medal – first place	2006 Pécs	Heavyweight

John Mickael M'Bumba (born April 29, 1983) is a French amateur boxer, born in Anderlecht, Belgium, best known for winning a bronze medal at the 2007 World Championships as a heavyweight (up to 91 kg). He also fought in the 2008 Summer Olympics.

== Career ==
The 192 cm Frenchman from Aubervilliers lost 2005 in the semifinal of the French Championships to Newfel Ouatah, at the Francophone Games December 2005 in Niamey he beat an inexperienced Didier Bence 46:28.

In 2006 he made it to the final of the French Championships but was KOd in the first round by Ouatah. The same year, at the European amateur boxing Championships in Plovdiv he defeated Memnun Hadžić from Bosnia and Herzegovina 23:12 but lost his next bout against Viktar Zuyev from Belarus 37:26.

He had his breakthrough year in 2007 when he became French champion finally beating Ouatah 33:7 and won a tournament in Spain where he beat world class Alexander Povernov.

As of 2007 he was listed as 42 wins-13losses-1 draw.

At the world championships 2007 he defeated touted Puerto Rican teenager Keith Tapia 28:13, surprisingly beat (21-14) the respected Greek Elias Pavlidis and Moldavian Mihail Muntean (22-13) and reached the semifinals where he lost to Russian southpaw Rakhim Chakhkiev (21-9). He qualified for the Olympics.

In Beijing he beat Colombian Deivi Julio Blanco but lost again to Chakhkiev.

At the world championships 2009 he again won bronze.
