= Tsolak Ananikyan =

Armenian boxer (born 1987)

Medal record

Men's Boxing

Representing Armenia

European Championships
Silver medal – second place	2008 Liverpool	Heavyweight

Tsolak Ananikyan (Armenian: Ցոլակ Անանիկյան; born 25 November 1987) is an Armenian amateur boxer.

Ananikyan won a silver medal at the 2008 European Amateur Boxing Championships in the heavyweight division.
