= Jorge Quiñonez =

Ecuadorian boxer

Personal information
- Born: 21 September 1984 (age 41) Tena, Ecuador

Sport
- Sport: Boxing
Medal record
Representing Ecuador
Men's boxing
Pan American Games
Bronze medal – third place	2007 Rio de Janeiro	Heavyweight
South American Games
Silver medal – second place	2010 Medellin	Heavyweight

Jorge Washington Quiñónez Tenorio (born 21 September 1984) is an Ecuadorian boxer best known to win heavyweight bronze at the 2007 Pan American Games.

== Career ==
At the Pan American Games he lost a razor-thin countback decision to Jose Julio Payares in the semifinal.

On 15 March 2008 at the First Americas Qualifier tournament in Port-of-Spain, Trinidad and Tobago, Quiñónez lost a countback decision, to Deontay Wilder. At the second qualifier he had moved up a class and lost to Jose Julio Payares, counting him out of the 2008 Summer Olympics.
