= Rakhim Chakhkiev =

Russian boxer (born 1983)

Rakhim Chakhkiev Рахим Чахкиев
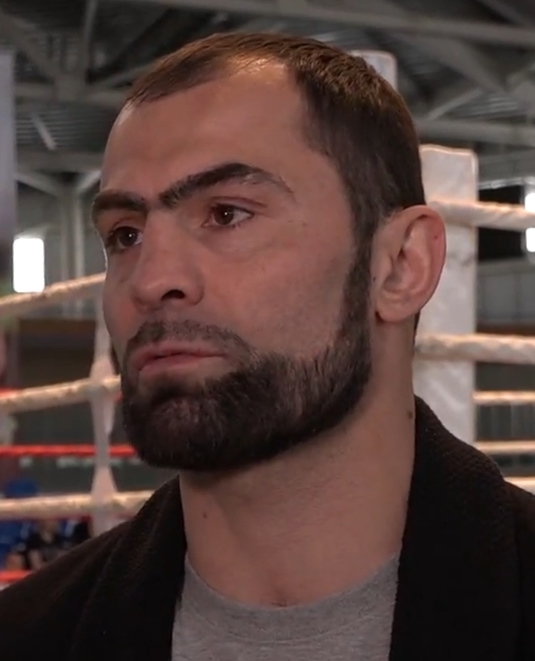

Personal information
- Nickname: The Machine
- Born: Rakhim Ruslanovich Chakhkiev; 11 January 1983 (age 43) Tobolsk, Russian SFSR, Soviet Union (now Russia)
- Height: 1.83 m (6 ft 0 in)
- Weight: Cruiserweight

Boxing career
- Stance: Southpaw

Boxing record
- Total fights: 29
- Wins: 26
- Win by KO: 19
- Losses: 3
Medal record
Men's amateur boxing
Representing Russia
Olympic Games
Gold medal – first place	2008 Beijing	Heavyweight
World Championships
Silver medal – second place	2007 Chicago	Heavyweight

Rakhim Ruslanovich Chakhkiev (Russian: Рахим Русланович Чахкиев; born 11 January 1983) is a Russian former professional boxer. He held the IBO cruiserweight title in 2015, the European cruiserweight title in 2014 and challenged for the WBC cruiserweight title in 2013. As an amateur, he won the heavyweight gold medal at the 2008 Summer Olympics.

== Amateur career ==
Chakhkiev won the silver medal in the heavyweight division at the 2007 World Championships in Chicago, USA, losing to Italy's Clemente Russo on points 7:6 in the final.

At the 2008 Summer Olympics in Beijing, China, he avenged his loss from the previous year by defeating Russo 4:2 in the final to claim the gold medal.

== Professional career ==
Chakhkiev turned professional in 2009, making his pro-debut with a second round knockout win over Tayar Mehmed at StadtHallen in Rostock, Germany, on 10 October that year.

He challenged WBC cruiserweight champion Krzysztof Włodarczyk at Krylatskoye Sports Palace in Moscow, Russia, on 21 June 2013, but lost by technical knockout in the eighth round.

Chakhkiev knocked out Giacobbe Fragomeni in the fourth round of their fight at Luzhniki Stadium in Moscow, Russia, on 24 October 2014 to win the vacant European cruiserweight title.

At the same venue, he became IBO cruiserweight champion by stopping Junior Anthony Wright in round eight of their bout for the vacant title on 22 May 2015.

Chakhkiev lost the championship in his first defense, suffering a knockout in the fifth round against Ola Afolabi at TatNeft Arena in Kazan, Russia, on 4 November 2015.

In what turned out to be his final fight, he was stopped in the seventh of a scheduled 10-round contest by Maxim Vlasov at Megasport Arena in Moscow, Russia, on 3 December 2016.

Chakhkiev announced his retirement from professional boxing in September 2017.

== Professional boxing record ==
29 fights	26 wins	3 losses
By knockout	19	3
By decision	7	0

No.	Result	Record	Opponent	Type	Round, time	Date	Location	Notes
29	Loss	26–3	Maxim Vlasov	TKO	7 (10), 0:17	3 Dec 2016	Megasport Arena, Moscow, Russia	For vacant WBA International cruiserweight title
28	Win	26–2	Alejandro Emilio Valori	KO	2 (10), 0:30	9 Sep 2016	Soviet Wings Sport Palace, Moscow, Russia	
27	Win	25–2	Tamas Lodi	UD	8	21 May 2016	Megasport Arena, Moscow, Russia	
26	Loss	24–2	Ola Afolabi	KO	5 (12), 1:44	4 Nov 2015	TatNeft Arena, Kazan, Russia	Lost IBO cruiserweight title
25	Win	24–1	Hamilton Ventura	UD	8	24 Sep 2015	Arbat Restaurant, Moscow, Russia	
24	Win	23–1	Junior Anthony Wright	KO	8 (12), 2:39	22 May 2015	Luzhniki Stadium, Moscow, Russia	Won vacant IBO cruiserweight title
23	Win	22–1	Valery Brudov	KO	4 (10), 1:58	10 Apr 2015	Luzhniki Stadium, Moscow, Russia	
22	Win	21–1	Jackson Junior	TKO	4 (10), 2:26	28 Nov 2014	Luzhniki Stadium, Moscow, Russia	
21	Win	20–1	Giacobbe Fragomeni	KO	4 (12), 0:52	24 Oct 2014	Luzhniki Stadium, Moscow, Russia	Won vacant European cruiserweight title
20	Win	19–1	Santander Silgado	UD	12	30 May 2014	Luzhniki Stadium, Moscow, Russia	Retained WBC Silver cruiserweight title
19	Win	18–1	Juho Haapoja	TKO	9 (12), 0:26	15 Mar 2014	Krylatskoye Sports Palace, Moscow, Russia	Won vacant WBC Silver cruiserweight title
18	Win	17–1	Giulian Ilie	KO	10 (10), 0:49	5 Oct 2013	Olympic Stadium, Moscow, Russia	
17	Loss	16–1	Krzysztof Włodarczyk	TKO	8 (12), 2:03	21 Jun 2013	Krylatskoye Sports Palace, Moscow, Russia	For WBC cruiserweight title
16	Win	16–0	Andres Taylor	UD	10	10 Nov 2012	O2 World, Hamburg, Germany	
15	Win	15–0	Epifanio Mendoza	KO	9 (10), 2:34	12 Oct 2012	O2 World, Hamburg, Germany	Retained WBC Baltic cruiserweight title
14	Win	14–0	Zack Page	TKO	6 (8), 1:35	11 May 2012	EWS Arena, Göppingen, Germany	
13	Win	13–0	Jaidon Codrington	KO	1 (10), 1:56	21 Apr 2012	Sport- und Kongresshalle, Schwerin, Germany	Retained WBC Baltic cruiserweight title
12	Win	12–0	Alexandr Kotlobay	UD	10	28 Jan 2012	Grand Elysée Hotel, Hamburg, Germany	Won WBC Baltic cruiserweight title
11	Win	11–0	Michael Simms	KO	4 (10), 1:43	24 Sep 2011	Dima Sport-Center, Hamburg, Germany	
10	Win	10–0	Harvey Jolly	KO	3 (4), 2:18	9 Apr 2011	MGM Grand Garden Arena, Paradise, Nevada, US	
9	Win	9–0	Alex Mogylewski	TKO	1 (6), 3:00	26 Mar 2011	Universum Gym, Hamburg, Germany	
8	Win	8–0	Łukasz Rusiewicz	UD	8	4 Dec 2010	Sport- und Kongresshalle, Schwerin, Germany	
7	Win	7–0	Chris Thomas	KO	1 (8), 2:59	19 Nov 2010	Universum Gym, Hamburg, Germany	
6	Win	6–0	Łukasz Rusiewicz	UD	6	3 Jul 2010	Porsche-Arena, Stuttgart, Germany	
5	Win	5–0	Slavomir Selicky	KO	1 (6), 1:22	24 Apr 2010	Alsterdorfer Sporthalle, Hamburg, Germany	
4	Win	4–0	Rene Huebner	RTD	4 (6), 3:00	17 Apr 2010	Bordelandhalle, Magdeburg, Germany	
3	Win	3–0	Igor Pylypenko	TKO	2 (6), 2:14	19 Dec 2009	Sport- und Kongresshalle, Schwerin, Germany	
2	Win	2–0	Denis Solomko	KO	2 (4), 0:47	21 Nov 2009	Sparkassen-Arena, Kiel, Germany	
1	Win	1–0	Tayar Mehmed	KO	2 (4), 2:02	10 Oct 2009	StadtHalle, Rostock, Germany	

== Awards ==
- Order of Friendship (August 3, 2009)

Sporting positions
Regional boxing titles
Preceded by Alexander Kotlobay	WBC Baltic cruiserweight champion 28 January 2012 – 21 June 2013; Lost bid for world title	Vacant Title next held by Mairis Briedis
Vacant Title last held by Ilunga Makabu	WBC Silver cruiserweight champion 15 March 2014 – October 2014; Vacated	Vacant Title next held by Olanrewaju Durodola
Vacant Title last held by Grigory Drozd	European cruiserweight champion 24 October 2014 – May 2015; Vacated	Vacant Title next held by Tony Bellew
Minor world boxing titles
Vacant Title last held by Ola Afolabi	IBO cruiserweight champion 22 May 2015 – 4 November 2015	Succeeded by Ola Afolabi
