= Eimantas =

- Gender: Male
- Language: Lithuanian
- Name day: 22 May

Origin
- Region of origin: Lithuania

Other names
- Related names: Eimuntas

Eimantas is a Lithuanian masculine given name. Individuals with the name Eimantas include:

- Eimantas Bendžius (born 1990), Lithuanian basketball player
- Eimantas Grakauskas (born 1947), Lithuanian jurist and politician
- Eimantas Poderis (born 1973), Lithuanian footballer
- Eimantas Stanionis (born 1994), Lithuanian boxer
