= Errol Spence Jr. vs. Terence Crawford =

Boxing match

The Fight of the Century
- Date: July 29, 2023
- Venue: T-Mobile Arena; Paradise, Nevada, United States
- Title(s) on the line: WBA (Super), WBC, IBF, WBO, vacant The Ring and TBRB undisputed welterweight titles

Tale of the tape
Boxer	Errol Spence Jr.	Terence Crawford
Nickname	The Truth	Bud
Hometown	Dallas, Texas, U.S.	Omaha, Nebraska, U.S.
Pre-fight record	28–0 (22 KO)	39–0 (30 KO)
Age	33 years, 4 months	35 years, 10 months
Height	5 ft 9 in (175 cm)	5 ft 8 in (173 cm)
Weight	147 lb (67 kg)	146 3/4 lb (67 kg)
Style	Southpaw	Southpaw (Note: Listed by BoxRec as southpaw, but regularly switch-hits as an orthodox.)
Recognition	WBA (Super), WBC, and IBF; Welterweight Champion; The Ring/TBRB; No. 1 Ranked Welterweight; The Ring No. 4 ranked pound-for-pound fighter	WBO; Welterweight Champion; The Ring/TBRB; No. 2 Ranked Welterweight; The Ring No. 3 ranked pound-for-pound fighter 3-division world champion

Result
- Crawford wins via 9th-round TKO

Errol Spence Jr. vs. Terence Crawford, billed as The Fight of the Century, was a welterweight professional boxing match between unified WBA (Super), WBC and IBF champion, Errol Spence Jr., and WBO champion, Terence Crawford. The fight took place on July 29, 2023 at the T-Mobile Arena in Paradise, Nevada, United States.

Crawford defeated Spence via ninth-round technical knockout to become the first male to win the undisputed championship in two weight classes in the four belt era. The fight reportedly sold 700,000 PPV buys, generating over $59 million in revenue. It also generated over $20 million from ticket sales.

== Background ==
In November 2018, American professional boxers Errol Spence Jr. and Terence Crawford came face to face at the Chesapeake Energy Arena in Oklahoma City. They exchanged words, expressing their desire to face each other. In April 2019, Crawford defeated English boxer Amir Khan via technical knockout and called out Spence to a bout. In November 2020, Crawford defeated Kell Brook, the first common opponent between Spence and Crawford, via technical knockout. Crawford called out Spence once again. In April 2022, Spence returned from a career-threatening surgery after he was involved in a single-vehicle accident in October 2019. He defeated Cuban boxer Yordenis Ugás via technical knockout and proceeded to call out Crawford.

In September 2022, Spence and Crawford were on the verge of a deal after months of negotiations for November 19. However, negotiations collapsed at the 11th hour. On October 20, Crawford told ESPN;

"I agreed to all of their [B.S.] and they've been dragging their ass for months. Spence was nowhere to be found while I was trying to make the deal. I explained to Al Haymon and Errol that I was going to fight before the end of the year. ... David Avanesyan is a very tough task. He's knocked out his last six opponents and this guy is dangerous. Once I'm successful against Avanesyan, my plan is still the same: whup Errol Spence's ass."

That same day, Spence replied on Twitter stating;

"[He's] been stalling for months I could’ve fought in November... been fighting at this weight for over a decade this shit ain’t easy or fun."

In December, Crawford defeated Russian boxer Avanesyan via knockout. In March 2023, Spence and Crawford revealed that they had a roughly 30-minute phone call in February with getting the deal over the line after Spence appeared headed for a fight with American boxer Keith Thurman at 154 pounds.

On May 23, ESPN reported that Spence vs Crawford agreed to a July 29 deal fight for the undisputed welterweight championship in Las Vegas. On May 25, it was announced that Spence and Crawford would face each other on July 29 at the T-Mobile Arena in Paradise, Nevada for the WBA Super, WBC, IBF and WBO welterweight titles.

== Fight night ==
On the night, Crawford made his entrance to the ring accompanied by American rapper Eminem, to his 2002 single "Lose Yourself".

Crawford dominated and won the fight by a ninth-round technical knockout to became the first undisputed welterweight champion since 2006 and the first male boxer in the four-belt era to claim undisputed championship status in two weight divisions. By that point, he had out-landed Spence 185 to 96 in total punches and 98 to 63 in power punches. Crawford was up 79–70 on all three scorecards at the time of the stoppage.

== Aftermath ==
After the fight, the IBF ordered Crawford to face its interim champion, Jaron Ennis. Because Spence exercised his rematch clause with Crawford, the IBF stripped Crawford of the title and made Ennis the full champion on November 9, 2023. In 2025, Spence stated that he would not have been prepared to compete within the timeframe required by the rematch agreement, saying: "I wouldn't have been ready, so how would I take a rematch if I'm not gonna be ready?"

== Fight card ==
Confirmed bouts:

Weight class		vs		Method	Round	Time	Notes
Main Card (PPV)
Welterweight	Terence Crawford (c)	def.	Errol Spence Jr. (c)	TKO	9/12	2:32	^{Note 1}
Lightweight	Isaac Cruz	def.	Giovanni Cabrera	SD	12		^{Note 2}
Bantamweight	Alexandro Santiago	def.	Nonito Donaire	UD	12		^{Note 3}
Junior middleweight	Yoenis Tellez	def.	Sergio García	TKO	3/10	2:01
Preliminary Card
Super middleweight	Steven Nelson	def.	Rowdy Legend Montgomery	UD	10
Super bantamweight	José Salas	def.	Aston Palicte	TKO	4/10	1:30
Lightweight	Jabin Chollet	def.	Michael Portales	TKO	2/6	1:58
Super featherweight	Justin Viloria	def.	Pedro Penunuri Borgaro	TKO	4/6	0:41
Lightweight	Demler Zamora	def.	Nikolai Buzolin	UD	8
Welterweight	Deshawn Prather	def.	Kevin Ceja Ventura	UD	6

^Note 1 For WBA (Super), WBC, IBF, WBO, and vacant The Ring welterweight titles
^Note 2 For WBC Silver and vacant WBO Latino lightweight title
^Note 3 For vacant WBC bantamweight title

== Broadcasting ==
Country/Region	Broadcaster			
Country/Region	Free	Cable TV	PPV	Stream
United States (host)	—N/a		Showtime PPV	
Australia	—N/a		Main Event	
France	—N/a	RMC Sport	—N/a	RMC BFM Play
Ireland	—N/a		TNT Sports Box Office	
United Kingdom	—N/a		TNT Sports Box Office	
Japan	—N/a	Wowow	—N/a	Wowow on Demand
Latin America	—N/a	ESPN	—N/a	Star+
Mexico	Azteca 7	—N/a		TV Azteca Deportes
Panama	RPC	—N/a		Medcom GO
Poland	TVP Sport	—N/a		TVP Go
Sub-Saharan Africa	—N/a	SuperSport	—N/a	DStv Now
Worldwide (unsold markets)	—N/a		FITE (Note: Spence Jr. vs Crawford coverage on FITE only available in Albania, Cambodia, Canada, Denmark, Estonia, Fiji islands, Finland, Germany, Iceland, Indonesia, Italy, Korea, Latvia, Lithuania, Malaysia, Mongolia, Netherlands, New Zealand, Norway, Philippines, Romania, Singapore, Sweden, Taiwan, Thailand, Türkiye, and Ukraine.)	
Worldwide (unsold markets)	—N/a		Fight Sports	

== Notes ==
Preceded by vs. Yordenis Ugás	Errol Spence Jr.'s bouts 29 July 2023	Succeeded by TBA
Preceded by vs. David Avanesyan	Terence Crawford's bouts 29 July 2023	Succeeded by vs. Israil Madrimov
