= Sadam Ali =

American boxer (born 1988)

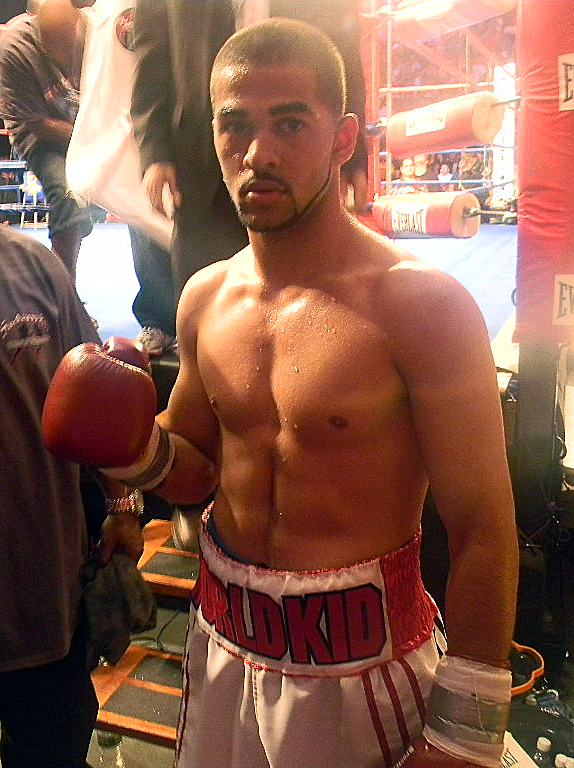
- Ali in 2010

Personal information
- Nickname: World Kid
- Nationality: American/Yemeni
- Born: September 26, 1988 (age 38) Brooklyn, New York City, New York, U.S.
- Height: 5 ft 8 in (173 cm)
- Weight: Welterweight; Light middleweight

Boxing career
- Reach: 73 in (185 cm)
- Stance: Orthodox

Boxing record
- Total fights: 31
- Wins: 28
- Win by KO: 14
- Losses: 3

Sadam Ali (born September 26, 1988) is an American former professional boxer who held the WBO junior middleweight title from 2017 to 2018. He also challenged once for the WBO welterweight title in 2016.

== Early life ==
Ali was born in 1988 in Brooklyn, New York. He was raised there by his Yemeni-immigrant parents, and has four sisters and a brother. Ali began boxing at the Bed-Stuy Boxing Club in the neighborhood of Bedford-Stuyvesant at the age of eight, after being inspired by Yemeni-British boxer "Prince" Naseem Hamed.

== Amateur career ==
Ali is a Junior Olympic National Champion, a PAL National Champion, a U-19 National Champion, and a two-time New York City Golden Gloves champion.

In 2006, Ali won the National Golden Glove Championship in the featherweight division in 2006 at the age of 17. Ali then represented the United States at the 2006 World Junior Championships, where he won a bronze medal after losing in the semifinal round to eventual gold medalist Yordan Frometa of Cuba by a score of 41–39, in a bout in which two points were deducted from Ali because he was weaving too low.

In 2007, Ali moved up to lightweight and again won the National Golden Glove Championship in his new division. Ali is only the second boxer to win it in two different weight classes in consecutive years in New York. Later that year, he was upset by Jerry Belemontes of Corpus Christi, Texas 13–12 in the quarterfinal round of the U.S. Boxing Championships. However, in August 2007, Ali defeated Belemontes and finished in first place in the lightweight division at the U.S. Olympic Trials in Houston, becoming the first boxer from the five boroughs of New York City to win at the trials since Riddick Bowe in 1988. While this did not immediately qualify him to represent the United States in the 2008 Summer Olympics in Beijing, he became the sole American lightweight permitted to compete in three Olympic qualification tournaments to be held over the ensuing eight months, for one of the six berths allocated to lightweights from the Americas. Ali was the first Arab-American to represent the United States in the Olympics.

The first of the three Olympic qualification tournaments was the World Amateur Boxing Championship, which was held in Chicago in the fall of 2007. Ali was eliminated in a competitive second round match by Armenia's Hrachik Javakhyan. As only one lightweight from the Americas qualified in Chicago, five berths remained open.

=== Alleged Cathine controversy ===
Three weeks after the Chicago tournament, Ali participated in a "USA vs. China and Kazakhstan" exhibition event held in Zunyi. Ali's doping test at the exhibition returned positive for Cathine, a banned stimulant found in the illegal Yemeni drug Khat. The infraction carried a potential two-year suspension from amateur competition, which would have disqualified him from the 2008 Summer Olympics.

Ali accepted a voluntary indefinite suspension on November 22, 2007. However, he maintained his innocence and appealed to the International Boxing Association ("AIBA") to overturn the test results, Ali hired an attorney to challenge the findings and allegations. Ali argues he had taken Cathine inadvertently after contracting a cold in China, but widespread use of stimulant drug Khat is known among the Yemeni American community. His doctor later admitted medicines he had given Ali, when mixed together could have created the positive test for Cathine. The Olympic Games Committee bars cathine in concentrations of over five micrograms per milliliter in urine. In February 2008, Ali agreed to drop his challenges in exchange for a three-month ban retroactive to the date on which he had originally accepted his voluntary suspension. Since his ban had expired on February 22, 2008, Ali was allowed to participate in the two remaining Olympic qualification tournaments held in the Spring of 2008.

=== Olympic qualification ===
Ali qualified for the 2008 Olympics by finishing in second place at the AIBA 1st Americas Olympic Qualifying Tournament held in Port of Spain, Trinidad and Tobago in March 2008. He defeated Jesus Cuadro of Venezuela in the quarterfinal round, and Juan Nicolas Cuellas of Argentina in the semifinal round. He lost by decision in the final round to Cuba's Yordenis Ugás by a score of 13–5. round.

On August 11, 2008, Ali was outboxed at the Olympic Games in his opening match, losing by decision to Georgian Popescu of Romania, by a score of 20–5. Ali turned professional after the 2008 Olympics.

His overall amateur record was 89–19, including a win over Terence Crawford, & became the only person to defeat him after his amateur career.

== Professional career ==
On January 17, 2009, Ali made his pro debut and needed just 1:42 to defeat Ricky Thompson. Ali recorded a third round stoppage of Julias Edmunds in his first live televised fight on ESPN on July 16, 2010, at The Prudential Center in Newark, New Jersey. He returned to The Prudential Center on August 21, 2010, in his second televised bout and knocked out Lenin Arroyo on the undercard to Tomas Adamek versus Michael Grant. On December, 9th to finish the year Ali on his 2nd PPV event fought to a unanimous decision against Manuel Guzman to record his 11th win. On April 9, in his 3rd PPV televised bout Ali knocked out Javier Pérez in the 3rd Round On the Tomas Ademek undercard.

November 6, 2010 Brooklyn, N.Y., welterweight Sadam Ali (10–0, 6 KOs), the 2008 U.S. Olympic lightweight and the first Arab-American boxer to go to the Olympics, scored an overwhelming second-round knockout of New Orleans' Gary Bergeron (12–6, 7 KOs).

Ali started fast, hammering a defensive Bergeron in the first round. He was landing solid uppercuts and left hands to the body before dropping him with a left hook to the chin. Bergeron survived, but Ali was crushing him with combinations as the round came to an end. Ali landed 37 of 92 punches in the opening round.

It was more of the same in the second round. While Ali was blasting him with left hook after left hook, Bergeron could little more than try to hold on, but he couldn't even do that effectively. Ali dropped him with an uppercut and was smashing him until a three-punch combination to the head badly staggered him again, forcing referee Lindsey Paige to stop the fight at 2 minutes, 18 seconds. Ali outlanded Bergeron 70–8 in the fight.

Ali signed with Golden Boy Boxing on June 24, 2013 to promote his boxing career.

On November 8, 2014, Sadam Ali took on Juan Carlos Abregu and was heading into the fight as a big underdog. Ali had upset the odds and defeated Abregu, the fight was stopped in the 9th round and ruled as a TKO victory which meant Ali had won the welterweight title. Ali had knocked down his opponent in the 6th and 9th round before the fight had been stopped.

On April 25, Ali defeated Francisco "Chia" Santana in a unanimous decision Madison Square Garden, Ali landed 196 of 588 punches (33 percent). Ali was quoted after the fight saying, "I'm thrilled with my victory," Ali said. "It's a dream come true to fight here at Madison Square Garden. I'd like to fight a top-10 contender in my next fight. He was a tough fighter. He hits very hard, but I was able to take his punches."

=== Vargas v Ali ===
Ali took a step up in class to fight Californian volume puncher Jessie Vargas in March 2016 for the WBO welterweight title left vacant by Timothy Bradley. While many pundits expected a close fight, Vargas landed more blows and the more effective blows in what was a decisive victory for him. Vargas knocked down Ali in rounds eight and nine. Vargas landed a brutal body shot followed by a right to the head to knock Ali out on his feet and win the vacant WBO world title. Vargas was ahead on all judges scorecards at the time of TKO (79–72, 77–74 twice). Vargas landed 159 punches from his 428 thrown compared to 118 landed from 408 thrown from Ali.

=== Comeback ===
Since losing to Vargas, Ali won two fights and on July 29 headlined a Goldenboy event against Venezuelan former WBA interim champion Johan Perez. This was expected to be a stern test for Ali but was an opportunity to become a title contender again. "A win in this fight puts me right back in position to compete for a world championship," Ali, who fights out of Brooklyn, New York, said. "I can't wait to get back in the ring and demonstrate the speed and power that has led me to be a top contender in the welterweight division."

=== Cotto vs. Ali ===
The 37-year-old legendary Puerto-Rican fighter had his moments against the 29-year-old New York native, but in the end, Ali's speed and fresher legs proved to be the difference and he sent the future Hall of Famer out on the losing end. After the bout, Ali was gracious and appreciative of the opportunity: ”Good things happen to good people. I have been training since I was 8 years old, and I am glad I got this win at MSG, in my hometown.” Cotto came in as the favorite in the bout, but Ali showed he was up to the task early in the fight as he staggered the rugged legend with a hard right hand. Cotto landed some nice body shots and he stopped Ali's attack on a few occasions with combinations. However, Ali landed more consistently from beginning to end. The boxing community chimed in with varying levels of respect.

==== Ali vs. Munguia ====
In his second title defence, Ali faced Mexican prospect Jaime Munguia. Munguia was ranked #4 by the WBO and #7 by the WBC at the time. Munguia proved to be too big and too strong for Ali, dropping him twice in round one, once in round two and once in round four, before the referee had seen enough. Ali showed a lot of heart in the fight, but Munguia simply dominated all of the rounds.

==== Ali vs. Herrera ====
In his next fight, Ali went back to welterweight and faced Mauricio Herrera. Ali managed to get the unanimous decision victory, winning 100–90, 99–91 and 98–92 on all three judges' scorecards.

== Boxing coach ==
In August 2019, Sadam Ali became a boxing coach and he trained YouTuber Slim Albaher for the YouTube boxing event Fousey vs. Slim.

== Professional boxing record ==
30 fights	27 wins	3 losses
By knockout	14	3
By decision	13	0

No.	Result	Record	Opponent	Type	Round, time	Date	Location	Notes
30	Loss	27–3	Anthony Young	TKO	3 (10), 2:38	May 4, 2019	T-Mobile Arena, Paradise, Nevada, U.S.	
29	Win	27–2	Mauricio Herrera	UD	10	Dec 15, 2018	Madison Square Garden, New York City, New York, U.S.	
28	Loss	26–2	Jaime Munguía	TKO	4 (12), 1:02	May 12, 2018	Turning Stone Resort Casino, Verona, New York, U.S.	Lost WBO light middleweight title
27	Win	26–1	Miguel Cotto	UD	12	Dec 2, 2017	Madison Square Garden, New York City, New York, U.S.	Won WBO light middleweight title
26	Win	25–1	Johan Pérez	UD	10	Jul 29, 2017	Casino Del Sol, Tucson, Arizona, U.S.	Won vacant WBA International welterweight title
25	Win	24–1	Jorge Silva	KO	3 (10), 2:27	Jan 28, 2017	Fantasy Springs Resort Casino, Indio, California, U.S.	
24	Win	23–1	Saul Corral	UD	10	Sep 17, 2016	AT&T Stadium, Arlington, Texas, U.S.	
23	Loss	22–1	Jessie Vargas	TKO	9 (12), 2:09	Mar 5, 2016	DC Armory, Washington, D.C., U.S.	For vacant WBO welterweight title
22	Win	22–0	Francisco Santana	UD	10	Apr 25, 2015	Madison Square Garden, New York City, New York, U.S.	Won WBA International welterweight title
21	Win	21–0	Luis Abregú	TKO	9 (10), 1:54	Nov 8, 2014	Boardwalk Hall, Atlantic City, New Jersey, U.S.	Retained WBO Inter-Continental welterweight title
20	Win	20–0	Jeremy Bryan	SD	10	Aug 9, 2014	Barclays Center, New York City, New York, U.S.	Won vacant WBO Inter-Continental welterweight title
19	Win	19–0	Michael Clark	KO	1 (10), 2:06	Apr 19, 2014	DC Armory, Washington, D.C., U.S.	Won interim WBO-NABO welterweight title
18	Win	18–0	Jesus Selig	TKO	6 (10), 0:22	Dec 7, 2013	Barclays Center, New York City, New York, U.S.	
17	Win	17–0	Jay Krupp	UD	8	Sep 30, 2013	Barclays Center, New York City, New York, U.S.	
16	Win	16–0	Ronnie Warrior Jr.	KO	2 (12), 2:59	Oct 27, 2012	Aviator Sports Complex, New York City, New York, U.S.	
15	Win	15–0	Franklin Gonzalez	TKO	8 (8), 2:22	Jun 2, 2012	Aviator Sports Complex, New York City, New York, U.S.	
14	Win	14–0	Boris Berg	RTD	5 (6), 3:00	Sep 10, 2011	Stadion Miejski, Wrocław, Poland	
13	Win	13–0	John Revish	UD	8	May 20, 2011	Prudential Center, Newark, New Jersey, U.S.	
12	Win	12–0	Javier Perez	KO	3 (8), 2:40	Apr 9, 2011	Prudential Center, Newark, New Jersey, U.S.	
11	Win	11–0	Manuel Guzman	UD	8	Dec 9, 2010	Prudential Center, Newark, New Jersey, U.S.	
10	Win	10–0	Gary Bergeron	TKO	2 (8), 2:18	Nov 6, 2010	Prudential Center, Newark, New Jersey, U.S.	
9	Win	9–0	Lenin Arroyo	KO	5 (8), 2:46	Aug 21, 2010	Prudential Center, Newark, New Jersey, U.S.	
8	Win	8–0	Julias Edmonds	TKO	3 (6), 1:14	Jul 16, 2010	Prudential Center, Newark, New Jersey, U.S.	
7	Win	7–0	Martinus Clay	UD	4	May 21, 2010	Capitale, New York City, New York, U.S.	
6	Win	6–0	Jose Duran	KO	1 (4), 1:32	Mar 12, 2010	Foxwoods Resort Casino, Mashantucket, Connecticut, U.S.	
5	Win	5–0	Jason Thompson	UD	4	Feb 16, 2010	Prudential Center, Newark, New Jersey, U.S.	
4	Win	4–0	Osvaldo Rivera	UD	4	Oct 31, 2009	Mohegan Sun Casino, Uncasville, Connecticut, U.S.	
3	Win	3–0	Bryan Abraham	UD	4	Apr 25, 2009	Foxwoods Resort Casino, Mashantucket, Connecticut, U.S.	
2	Win	2–0	Ralph Prescott	TKO	2 (4), 1:41	Feb 25, 2009	B.B. King Blues Club & Grill, New York, New York, U.S.	
1	Win	1–0	Ricky Thompson	TKO	1 (4), 1:42	Jan 17, 2009	Beau Rivage, Biloxi, Mississippi, U.S.	Professional debut

== See also ==
- List of light-middleweight boxing champions

Achievements
Preceded by Miguel Cotto	WBO light middleweight champion December 2, 2017 – May 12, 2018	Succeeded by Jaime Munguia
