= Cody Crowley =

Canadian boxer (born 1993)

Personal information
- Nickname: The Crippler
- Born: 25 March 1993 (age 33) Peterborough, Ontario, Canada
- Height: 5 ft 10 in (178 cm)
- Weight: Welterweight; Light middleweight

Boxing career
- Reach: 72 in (183 cm)
- Stance: Southpaw

Boxing record
- Total fights: 22
- Wins: 22
- Win by KO: 9
- Losses: 0

Cody Crowley (born 25 March 1993) is a Canadian professional boxer.

== Professional boxing career ==
Crowley made his professional debut against Ronnie Peterson on 28 June 2014. He won the fight by a second-round technical knockout. He amassed an 11–0 record during the next three years, before being booked to face Edgar Ortega for the vacant Canadian Professional Boxing Council's International super-welterweight title on 13 May 2017. He won his first professional title by a dominant unanimous decision, with all three judges awarding him all ten rounds of the bout. Crowley made his first title defense against Richard Holmes on 30 September 2017. He won the fight by a sixth-round technical knockout.

Crowley was booked to face Kevin Higson for the vacant Canadian Professional Boxing Council National super welterweight title on 5 May 2018. He won the fight by a dominant unanimous decision, with all three judges scoring the fight 100–90 in his favor. Crowely next faced Michi Munoz in a non-title bout on 14 July 2018. He won the fight by a second-round knockout. Crowley faced Juan Angulo Gonzalez in yet another non-title bout on 16 November 2018. He won the fight by a sixth-round technical knockout.

Crowley made his first CPBC National super welterweight title defense against Stuart McLellan on 9 February 2019. He won the fight by unanimous decision, with all three judges scoring the fight 120–107 in his favor. Crowley made his second national title defense against Mian Hussain on 19 October 2019. He won the fight by unanimous decision, with all three judges scoring the fight 100–90 for him.

Crowely's sole fight of 2020 came against Josh Torres on 6 September 2020, at the Microsoft Theater in Los Angeles, on the undercard of the Yordenis Ugas and Abel Ramos WBA World welterweight title bout. It was his first fight in United States since 14 May 2016. Crowely won the fight by a unanimous decision, with all three judges awarding him a 100–90 scorecard.

Crowley was expected to face the #1 ranked IBF welterweight contender Kudratillo Abdukakhorov on 10 April 2021, as a replacement for Javier Flores, who was forced to withdraw from the bout after a positive COVID-19 test. The fight would fail to pan out however, as the two camps were unable to come to terms. Crowley was instead booked to face Gabriel Maestre for the vacant WBA interim welterweight title on 7 August 2021. Crowley withdrew from the fight on 29 July, after testing positive for COVID-19.

Crowley was booked to face the Kudratillo Abdukakhorov on 11 December 2021, at the Dignity Health Sports Park in Carson, California, on the undercard of the Nonito Donaire and Reymart Gaballo WBC world bantamweight title bout. Despite getting knocked down in the second round, Crowley managed to rally back in the following rounds and win the fight by unanimous decision, with scores of 97–92, 95–94 and 98–91.

Crowely was booked to face the one-time WBA welterweight and WBC light middleweight title challenger Josesito López on April 16, 2022, on the Errol Spence Jr. vs. Yordenis Ugás welterweight title unification pay per view. He won the fight by unanimous decision, with two scorecards of 98–91 and one scorecard of 99–90. Crowley scored the sole knockdown of the fight in the seventh round, although Lopez immediately claimed it as a slip.

Crowley faced the one-time WBA welterweight title challenger Abel Ramos in a WBC title eliminator on March 25, 2023. He won the fight by majority decision, with scores of 114–114, 116–112 and 115–113.

=== [Cancelled]IBF Welterweight Championship bout ===
==== Crowley vs. Ennis ====
Crowley was scheduled to challenge Jaron Ennis for his IBF welterweight title at Wells Fargo Center in Philadelphia, Pennsylvania on July 13, 2024. Early June, Crowley announced that he was forced to withdraw from the bout due to retina issue.

== Professional boxing record ==
22 fights	22 wins	0 losses
By knockout	9	0
By decision	13	0

No.	Result	Record	Opponent	Type	Round, time	Date	Location	Notes
22	Win	22–0	Abel Ramos	MD	10	25 Mar 2023	MGM Grand Garden Arena, Paradise, Nevada, U.S.	
21	Win	21–0	Josesito López	UD	10	Apr 16, 2022	AT&T Stadium, Arlington, Texas, U.S.	
20	Win	20–0	Kudratillo Abdukakhorov	UD	10	11 Dec 2021	Dignity Health Sports Park, Carson, California, U.S.	
19	Win	19–0	Josh Torres	UD	10	6 Sep 2020	Microsoft Theater, Los Angeles, U.S.	
18	Win	18–0	Mian Hussain	UD	10	19 Oct 2019	Memorial Centre, Peterborough, Canada	Retained CPBC National super welterweight title
17	Win	17–0	Stuart McLellan	UD	12	9 Feb 2019	Memorial Centre, Peterborough, Canada	Retained CPBC National super welterweight title
16	Win	16–0	Juan Angulo Gonzalez	TKO	6 (10), 1:45	16 Nov 2018	Cheer's Bar, Tijuana, Mexico	
15	Win	15–0	Michi Munoz	KO	2 (8), 2:56	14 Jul 2018	Yardman Arena, Belleville, Canada	
14	Win	14–0	Kevin Higson	UD	10	5 May 2018	Memorial Centre, Peterborough, Canada	Won vacant CPBC National super welterweight title
13	Win	13–0	Richard Holmes	TKO	6 (10), 2:08	30 Sep 2017	Memorial Centre, Peterborough, Canada	Retained CPBC International super welterweight title
12	Win	12–0	Edgar Ortega	UD	10	13 May 2017	Memorial Centre, Peterborough, Canada	Won vacant CPBC International super welterweight title
11	Win	11–0	Juan Carlos Cano	TKO	3 (8), 2:43	25 Feb 2017	Hershey Centre, Mississauga, Canada	
10	Win	10–0	Leopoldo Nunez Montano	TKO	3 (8), 0:53	10 Dec 2016	AS Boxing Arena, Tijuana, Mexico	
9	Win	9–0	Marcelo Fabian Bzowski	UD	8	24 Sep 2016	Hershey Centre, Mississauga, Canada	
8	Win	8–0	Corey McCants	UD	6	14 May 2016	Maryland State Fairgrounds, Lutherville-Timonium, U.S.	
7	Win	7–0	Antonio Chaves Fernandez	UD	6	19 Mar 2016	House of Blues, Boston, U.S.	
6	Win	6–0	Kevin Mario Cooper	TKO	1 (4), 2:36	12 Dec 2015	Du Burns Arena, Baltimore, U.S.	
5	Win	5–0	Alan Beeman	TKO	1 (4)	26 Sep 2015	Masonic Temple, Norfolk, U.S.	
4	Win	4–0	Arnoldo Poblete	UD	4	27 Jun 2015	Ajax Community Centre, Ajax, Canada	
3	Win	3–0	Anthony Hill	UD	6	27 Sep 2014	OKC Downtown Airpark, Oklahoma City, U.S.	
2	Win	2–0	Herb Begay	RTD	2 (4), 3:00	2 Aug 2014	The Cosmopolitan, Las Vegas, U.S.	
1	Win	1–0	Ronnie Peterson	TKO	2 (4), 1:51	28 Jun 2014	CenturyLink Center, Omaha, U.S.	
