= José Salas (boxer) =

Mexican boxer (born 2002)

Personal information
- Nickname: El Chapulín ("The Grasshopper")
- Born: José Manuel Salas Reyes; March 31, 2002 (age 24) Tijuana, Baja California, Mexico
- Height: 1.70 m (5 ft 7 in)
- Weight: Bantamweight; Super bantamweight

Boxing career
- Stance: Southpaw

Boxing record
- Total fights: 17
- Wins: 17
- Win by KO: 11
- Losses: 0

José Manuel Salas Reyes (born March 31, 2002) is a Mexican professional boxer who has held the International Boxing Federation (IBF) bantamweight title since December 2025.

== Professional career ==
=== Early career ===
==== Debut ====
On November 27, 2020, Salas made his debut against fellow debutant Jesús Salvador Díaz Villalobos in Bar Bosse, Tijuana, Mexico, Salas won via unanimous decision over four rounds.

==== Rise up the ranks ====
On April 19, 2023, Salas made his United States debut against Ghanaian and former olympian Prince Octopus Dzanie in a scheduled ten rounds in Plant City, Florida, United States, Salas defeated the 23–0 via unanimous decision over ten rounds. On July 29, 2023, Salas was scheduled to face two-time super flyweight world title-challenger and veteran Aston Palicte on the historic Errol Spence Jr. vs. Terence Crawford's undercard. Salas prevailed via a stunning fourth-round stoppage, cementing his credibility as a prospect.

=== IBF bantamweight championship ===
==== Salas vs. Ngxeke ====
On December 13, 2025, in Mexico City, Mexico, Salas fought South Africa Landile Ngxeke for the vacant IBF bantamweight championship after Junto Nakatani vacated the title to move up to the super bantamweight division. Salas stopped Ngxeke in the seventh-round to become the new IBF bantamweight champion.

== Professional boxing record ==
17 fights	17 wins	0 losses
By knockout	11	0
By decision	6	0

No.	Result	Record	Opponent	Type	Round, time	Date	Location	Notes
17	Win	17–0	Landile Ngxeke	TKO	7 (12), 1:54	Dec 13, 2025	Explanada de la Alcadía GAM, Mexico City, Mexico	Won vacant IBF bantamweight title
16	Win	16–0	Arturo Iván Hernández Nájera	UD	8	May 15, 2025	Palenque de la Feria del Caballo, Texcoco, Mexico	
15	Win	15–0	Luis Guzmán Torres	UD	10	Apr 19, 2024	Audtorio Municipal, Tijuana, Mexico	Won vacant WBC Youth Intercontinental bantamweight title
14	Win	14–0	Florentino Pérez Hernández	UD	10	Oct 20, 2023	Auditorio Municipal, Tijuana, Mexico	
13	Win	13–0	Aston Palicte	TKO	4 (10), 1:30	Jul 29, 2023	T-Mobile Arena, Paradise, Nevada, U.S.	
12	Win	12–0	Prince Octopus Dzanie	UD	10	Apr 19, 2023	Whitesands Events Center, Plant City, Florida, U.S.	
11	Win	11–0	Ángel Martínez Castillo	TKO	3 (8), 0:47	Nov 4, 2022	La Casa de los Zonkeys, Tijuana, Mexico	
10	Win	10–0	Miguel Ángel Rodríguez Vivanco	TKO	3 (8), 2:25	Aug 5, 2022	La Casa de los Zonkeys, Tijuana, Mexico	
9	Win	9–0	Miguel Rojas Alba	RTD	3 (8), 3:00	May 20, 2022	La Casa de los Zonkeys, Tijuana, Mexico	
8	Win	8–0	Óscar Saucedo González	TKO	4 (8), 1:07	Mar 4, 2022	La Casa de los Zonkeys, Tijuana, Mexico	
7	Win	7–0	Irvis Moreno Vázquez	TKO	1 (6), 2:42	Nov 12, 2021	Grand Hotel, Tijuana, Mexico	
6	Win	6–0	Joel Alberto Mora	TKO	3 (6), 0:57	Sep 28, 2021	Big Punch Arena, Tijuana, Mexico	
5	Win	5–0	Alberto Sotelo Robles	TKO	4 (4), 1:04	Jul 23, 2021	Grand Hotel, Tijuana, Mexico	
4	Win	4–0	Kevin Rodríguez García	TKO	2 (4), 1:20	Jun 5, 2021	Big Punch Arena, Tijuana, Mexico	
3	Win	3–0	Exon Martínez Muñoz	UD	4	Apr 9, 2021	Grand Hotel, Tijuana, Mexico	
2	Win	2–0	Jesús Claudio Felix Duarte	TKO	1 (4), 2:49	Feb 26, 2021	Big Punch Arena, Tijuana, Mexico	
1	Win	1–0	Jesús Salvador Díaz Villalobos	UD	4	Nov 27, 2020	Bar Bosse, Tijuana, Mexico	

Sporting positions
Regional boxing titles
Preceded by Oscar Cantu	WBC Youth Intercontinental bantamweight champion April 19, 2024 – 2025; Vacated	Vacant Title next held by Bruno Macho
World boxing titles
Vacant Title last held by Junto Nakatani	IBF bantamweight champion December 13, 2025 – present	Incumbent
