= Thomas Dulorme =

Puerto Rican boxer (born 1990)

Personal information
- Nickname: El Francés ("The Frenchman")
- Nationality: Puerto Rican
- Born: Thomas Dulorme Cordero; January 29, 1990 (age 36) Marigot, Saint Martin
- Height: 5 ft 10 in (178 cm)
- Weight: Light welterweight; Welterweight

Boxing career
- Reach: 70 in (178 cm)
- Stance: Orthodox

Boxing record
- Total fights: 34
- Wins: 26
- Win by KO: 17
- Losses: 7
- Draws: 1

Thomas Dulorme Cordero (/djuːˈlɔːrmeɪ/ dew-LOR-may; born January 29, 1990) is a Puerto Rican professional boxer who challenged for the WBO light welterweight title in 2015.

== Early life and amateur career ==
Dulorme was born on the island of Saint Martin and lived there until the age of 3, when his family moved to Puerto Rico. His father is a native of Saint Martin, and his mother is of Puerto Rican descent. His family later briefly moved to the Dominican Republic before eventually settling back in Puerto Rico when he was 8 years old. He began boxing at an early age, winning Golden Gloves tournaments in Saint Martin, Dominican Republic and Puerto Rico. According to Dulorme, his amateur record was 140–2. Dulorme's younger brother, Starling Cordero, is also a boxer.

Dulorme identifies himself as Puerto Rican, stating his desire to "represent Puerto Rico every time that [he] steps in a ring". Dulorme subsequently became one of the founding members of Gary Shaw, Lou Dibella and Universal Promotion's Team Puerto Rico, a stable composed of several high-profile prospects, including amateur world medalist and WBC Youth World Champion José Pedraza.

== Professional career ==
Although he struggled in his professional debut against David Rodriguez, Dulorme was able to string together a streak of 10 straight knockouts, capped by the stoppage of Harrison Cuello on the undercard of the Andre Berto vs. Victor Ortiz bout.

=== Dulorme vs. Corley ===
On June 10, 2011, Dulorme beat former welterweight titleholder DeMarcus "Chop Chop" Corley via a near-shutout unanimous decision, dropping the veteran fighter in the third round.

=== Dulorme vs. Ambriz ===
On February 18, 2012, Dulorme made an appearance on the ShoBox: The New Generation series, beating late sub Aris Ambriz via first-round knockout.

=== Dulorme vs. James ===
On August 8, 2020, Dulorme, ranked #10 by the WBA at welterweight fought the #5 ranked Jamal James. Dulorme lost the fight via unanimous decision, with all three judges scoring the fight 117–111, 116-112 and 115–113 in favor of James.

=== Dulorme vs. Stanionis ===
In his next bout, Dulorme, ranked #14 by the WBA fought Eimantas Stanionis, ranked #10 by the WBA at the time. Stanionis won the fight via unanimous decision winning 117–111, 116-112 and 115–113 on the scorecards.

=== Dulorme vs. Ennis ===
In his next fight, Dulorme fought Jaron Ennis, who was ranked #7 by The Ring, #3 by the IBF, #5 by the WBO and WBA and #6 by the WBC at welterweight. Dulorme lost the fight via a first-round knockout.

=== Dulorme vs. Ortiz Jr ===
On April 27, 2024 in Fresno, CA, Dulorme was scheduled to face Vergil Ortiz Jr. in the 10-round bout at super welterweight. Dulorme lost the fight by knockout in the first round with liver shot.

== Professional boxing record ==
| 34 fights | 26 wins | 7 losses |
|---|---|---|
| By knockout | 17 | 4 |
| By decision | 9 | 3 |
| Draws | 1 | |

| No. | Result | Record | Opponent | Type | Round, time | Date | Location | Notes |
|---|---|---|---|---|---|---|---|---|
| 34 | Loss | 26–7–1 | Vergil Ortiz Jr. | KO | 1 (12) | Apr 27, 2024 | Save Mart Arena, Fresno, California, U.S. | |
| 33 | Win | 26–6–1 | Abrahan Peralta | TKO | 3 (8) | Jul 22, 2022 | Coliseo Carlos 'Teo' Cruz, Santo Domingo, Dominican Republic | |
| 32 | Loss | 25–6–1 | Jaron Ennis | KO | 1 (10), 1:49 | Oct 30, 2021 | Michelob Ultra Arena, Paradise, Nevada, U.S. | |
| 31 | Loss | 25–5–1 | Eimantas Stanionis | UD | 12 | Apr 10, 2021 | Mohegan Sun Arena, Uncasville, Connecticut, U.S. | |
| 30 | Loss | 25–4–1 | Jamal James | UD | 12 | Aug 8, 2020 | Microsoft Theater, Los Angeles, California, U.S. | For WBA interim welterweight title |
| 29 | Win | 25–3–1 | Terrel Williams | UD | 10 | Sep 21, 2019 | Rabobank Theater, Bakersfield, California, U.S. | |
| 28 | Draw | 24–3–1 | Jessie Vargas | MD | 12 | Oct 6, 2018 | Wintrust Arena, Chicago, Illinois, U.S. | For vacant WBC Silver welterweight title |
| 27 | Loss | 24–3 | Yordenis Ugás | UD | 10 | Aug 26, 2017 | T-Mobile Arena, Paradise, Nevada, U.S. | |
| 26 | Win | 24–2 | Brian Jones | TKO | 6 (8), 1:49 | Jan 14, 2017 | Barclays Center, New York City, New York, U.S. | |
| 25 | Win | 23–2 | Jesus Gurrola | RTD | 3 (8), 3:00 | Jun 18, 2016 | Pabellon de la Feria, Albacete, Spain | |
| 24 | Loss | 22–2 | Terence Crawford | TKO | 6 (12), 1:51 | Apr 18, 2015 | College Park Center, Arlington, Texas, U.S. | For vacant WBO light welterweight title |
| 23 | Win | 22–1 | Henry Lundy | SD | 10 | Dec 6, 2014 | Barclays Center, New York City, New York, U.S. | Retained WBC-NABF light welterweight title; Won vacant WBO-NABO light welterweight title |
| 22 | Win | 21–1 | Karim Mayfield | UD | 10 | Mar 29, 2014 | The Ballroom, Atlantic City, New Jersey, U.S. | Won vacant WBC-NABF light welterweight title |
| 21 | Win | 20–1 | Héctor Velázquez | UD | 8 | Nov 30, 2013 | Coliseo Guillermo Angulo, Carolina, Puerto Rico | |
| 20 | Win | 19–1 | Francisco Figueroa | TKO | 8 (10), 0:47 | Aug 17, 2013 | Revel Resort, Atlantic City, New Jersey, U.S. | |
| 19 | Win | 18–1 | Ben Ankrah | UD | 8 | Apr 13, 2013 | Coliseo Guillermo Angulo, Carolina, Puerto Rico | |
| 18 | Win | 17–1 | Eddie Brooks | RTD | 1 (8), 1:35 | Feb 21, 2013 | Roseland Ballroom, New York City, New York, U.S. | |
| 17 | Loss | 16–1 | Luis Carlos Abregu | TKO | 7 (10), 2:35 | Oct 27, 2012 | Turning Stone Resort & Casino, New York City, New York, U.S. | For vacant WBC International welterweight title |
| 16 | Win | 16–0 | Yoryi Estrella | UD | 10 | Aug 31, 2012 | Coliseo Guillermo Angulo, Carolina, Puerto Rico | |
| 15 | Win | 15–0 | Alberto Herrera | RTD | 7 (10), 3:00 | Jun 14, 2012 | Roseland Ballroom, New York City, New York, U.S. | |
| 14 | Win | 14–0 | Aris Ambriz | KO | 1 (10), 2:12 | Feb 17, 2012 | Chumash Casino, Santa Ynez, California, U.S. | Won vacant WBC-NABF welterweight title |
| 13 | Win | 13–0 | Charlie Jose Navarro | UD | 9 | Oct 22, 2011 | Roberto Durán Arena, Panama City, Panama | Retained WBA-NABA USA welterweight title |
| 12 | Win | 12–0 | DeMarcus Corley | UD | 10 | Jun 10, 2011 | Roseland Ballroom, New York City, New York, U.S. | Won vacant WBA-NABA USA welterweight title |
| 11 | Win | 11–0 | Harrison Cuello | KO | 2 (8), 1:27 | Apr 16, 2011 | Foxwoods Resort Casino, Mashantucket, Connecticut, U.S. | |
| 10 | Win | 10–0 | Guillermo Valdes | TKO | 2 (6), 2:30 | Mar 12, 2011 | Foxwoods Resort Casino, Ledyard, Connecticut, U.S. | |
| 9 | Win | 9–0 | Jorge Delgado | KO | 2 (6), 0:46 | Feb 18, 2011 | Juan Pachín Vicéns Auditorium, Ponce, Puerto Rico | |
| 8 | Win | 8–0 | Jose Ramon Sanchez | KO | 2 (6), 1:18 | Dec 18, 2010 | Coliseo Jose Huyke, Morovis, Puerto Rico | |
| 7 | Win | 7–0 | Keivy Arce | KO | 2 (6), 1:12 | Aug 27, 2010 | Coliseo Dolores "Toyita" Melendez, Juana Diaz, Puerto Rico | |
| 6 | Win | 6–0 | Jonathan Gonzalez | KO | 2 (4), 1:55 | Jul 9, 2010 | Coliseo Salvador Dijols, Ponce, Puerto Rico | |
| 5 | Win | 5–0 | Efrain Perez | TKO | 1 (4), 1:03 | Dec 4, 2009 | Juan Pachín Vicéns Auditorium, Ponce, Puerto Rico | |
| 4 | Win | 4–0 | Alexis Ubilla | TKO | 2 (4), 2:48 | Sep 18, 2009 | Coliseo Dolores "Toyita" Melendez, Juana Diaz, Puerto Rico | |
| 3 | Win | 3–0 | Roberto Cuevas | TKO | 2 (4) | Jul 17, 2009 | Coliseo Dr. Edwin "Puruco" Nolasco, Coamo, Puerto Rico | |
| 2 | Win | 2–0 | Pedro Agosto | TKO | 1 (4), 1:38 | Feb 28, 2009 | Juan Pachín Vicéns Auditorium, Ponce, Puerto Rico | |
| 1 | Win | 1–0 | David Rodriguez | MD | 4 | Aug 13, 2008 | Hard Rock Hotel and Casino, Hollywood, Florida, U.S. | |

== Titles in boxing ==
Minor Sanctioning Bodies:

- NABA USA Welterweight Champion (147 lbs)
- NABF Welterweight Champion (147 lbs)
- NABF Light Welterweight Champion (140 lbs)
- WBO NABO Light Welterweight Champion (140 lbs)
