= Radzhab Butaev =

Russian boxer (born 1993)

Personal information
- Nickname: The Python
- Nationality: Russian
- Born: 15 December 1993 (age 32) Khasavyurt, Dagestan, Russia
- Height: 1.79 m (5 ft 10 in)
- Weight: Welterweight; Light-middleweight

Boxing career
- Reach: 183 cm (72 in)
- Stance: Orthodox

Boxing record
- Total fights: 17
- Wins: 15
- Win by KO: 12
- Losses: 1
- No contests: 1
Medal record
Men's amateur boxing
Representing Russia
Summer Universiade
Gold medal – first place	2013 Kazan	Light welterweight

Radzhab Yusupovich Butaev (Russian: Раджаб Юсупович Бутаев; born 15 December 1993) is a Russian professional boxer who has held the WBA (Regular) welterweight title from October 2021 to April 2022. At regional level he held the WBC-NABF super-welterweight title in 2016

== Amateur career ==
As an amateur, Butaev was a winner of the Kazan Summer Universiade in 2013, fighting at light-welterweight.

In 2015 he won six bouts of the World Series of Boxing.

== Professional career ==
=== Early career ===
Butaev made his professional debut against Robert Alexander Seyam on March 25, 2016, and won his debut fight by a first-round knockout. He amassed a 10–0 record over the next two years, with just two victories coming by decision. Buatev faced Lanardo Tyner on March 8, 2019, and won the fight by a third-round technical knockout. Butaev was scheduled to face Silverio Ortiz on May 3, 2019, whom he beat by unanimous.

On September 30, 2019, it was announced that Butaev would fight Alexander Besputin for the vacant WBA Regular and EBP welterweight titles. Both Butaev and Besputin earned $252,777.50 for the fight, a 50/50 split of the purse. Butaev lost the fight by unanimous decision, with all three judges awarding Besputin a 116–112 scorecard. On January 15, 2020, it was revealed by the Monaco Boxing Federation that Besputin had tested positive for ligandrol, a substance prohibited by WADA. Butaev immediately called the outcome of the fight into question, saying that the positive test was a "...disgrace and is disrespectful to the sport of boxing". The fight was overturned to a no contest on July 6, 2020. Besputin was accordingly stripped of both titles.

Butaev was scheduled to face the undefeated Terry Chatwood on December 26, 2020. He won the fight by a third-round knockout, stopping Chatwood with a left hook to the body at the 1:01 minute mark.

=== WBA Regular welterweight champion ===
The reigning WBA (Regular) welterweight champion Jamal James was ordered the face Butaev, who was at the time the #3 ranked WBA welterweight contender, in his first title defense. The fight was ordered on February 4, 2021, and the two were given a 30 days to negotiate before a purse bid would be called. The fight was once again ordered on September 26, 2021, and was later scheduled for October 30, 2021, at Michelob Ultra Arena in Paradise, Nevada, USA. Butaev achieved his career best win, as he stopped James by technical knockout at the 2:12 minute mark of the ninth round.

Butaev made the first defense of the title against Eimantas Stanionis at AT&T Stadium in Arlington, Texas, USA, on April 16, 2022. He lost via split decision with one of the ringside judges scoring the fight 114–113 in his favour, but being overruled by their two colleagues who had the fight and 116–111 and 117–110 for his opponent.

=== Zuffa Boxing ===
After winning two low key fights over the next three years, both of which he won, Butaev signed for Zuffa Boxing in December 2025. He made his debut for the promotion at the Meta Apex in Enterprise, Nevada, USA, on February 1, 2026, losing to Serhii Bohachuk by split decision. The judges' scorecards were 96–94, 94–96 and 94–96.

== Professional boxing record ==
20 fights	16 wins	3 losses
By knockout	12	0
By decision	4	3
No contests	1	

No.	Result	Record	Opponent	Type	Round, time	Date	Location	Notes
20	Loss	16–3 (1)	Alexander Castro	MD	10	14 Nov 2026	The Venue, Riyadh, Saudi Arabia	
19	Loss	16–2 (1)	Serhii Bohachuk	SD	10	1 Feb 2026	Meta Apex, Enterprise, Nevada, U.S.	
18	Win	16–1 (1)	Artem Pugach	UD	8	14 Nov 2025	Humo Arena, Tashkent, Uzbekistan	
17	Win	15–1 (1)	Fazliddin Gaibnazarov	RTD	3 (10), 3:00	6 Nov 2023	Red Arena, Krasnaya Polyana, Russia	
16	Lost	14–1 (1)	Eimantas Stanionis	SD	12	16 Apr 2022	AT&T Stadium, Arlington, Texas, U.S.	Lost WBA (Regular) welterweight title
15	Win	14–0 (1)	Jamal James	TKO	9 (12), 2:12	30 Oct 2021	Michelob Ultra Arena, Paradise, Nevada, U.S.	Won WBA (Regular) welterweight title
14	Win	13–0 (1)	Terry Chatwood	KO	3 (10), 2:58	26 Dec 2020	Shrine Exposition Center, Los Angeles, California, U.S.	
13	NC	12–0 (1)	Alexander Besputin	NC	12	30 Nov 2019	Casino Monte Carlo Salle Medicin, Monaco	Originally a UD win for Besputin, later ruled an NC after Besputin failed a drug test; Vacant WBA (Regular) and EBP welterweight titles were at stake
12	Win	12–0	Silverio Ortiz	UD	6	3 May 2019	Sands Bethlehem Event Center, Bethlehem, Pennsylvania, U.S.	
11	Win	11–0	Lanardo Tyner	TKO	3 (8), 1:48	8 Mar 2019	Maryland Live Casino, Hanover, Maryland, U.S.	
10	Win	10–0	Azael Cosio	RTD	3 (10), 3:00	27 Oct 2018	Madison Square Garden Theater, New York City, New York, U.S.	
9	Win	9–0	Ramses Agaton	KO	3 (8), 2:58	20 Jul 2018	Florentine Gardens, El Monte, California, U.S.	
8	Win	8–0	Janer Gonzalez	UD	8	10 Nov 2017	Masonic Temple & Performing Arts Center, Cleveland, Ohio, U.S.	
7	Win	7–0	Sherzodbek Alimjanov	KO	3 (8), 1:45	22 Jul 2017	Red Square, Moscow, Russia	
6	Win	6–0	Abraham Alvarez	KO	1 (8), 1:05	3 Jun 2017	Foxwoods Resort, Ledyard, Connecticut, U.S	
5	Win	5–0	Bakhrom Payazov	TKO	1 (8), 1:00	5 Apr 2017	Korston Club, Moscow, Russia	
4	Win	4–0	Gabor Gorbics	UD	8	19 Nov 2016	Foxwoods Resort, Ledyard, Connecticut, U.S.	Won vacant WBC-NABF super-welterweight title
3	Win	3–0	Jonathan Batista	KO	4 (6), 2:01	19 Oct 2016	Grady Cole Center, Charlotte, North Carolina, U.S.	
2	Win	2–0	TyKeem Sadler	TKO	1 (6), 1:37	16 Apr 2016	Barclays Center, New York City, New York, U.S.	
1	Win	1–0	Robert Alexander Seyam	KO	1 (6), 1:19	25 Mar 2016	Buffalo Run Casino, Miami, Oklahoma, U.S.	

== See also ==
- List of world welterweight boxing champions

Sporting positions
World boxing titles
Preceded by Jamal James	WBA welterweight champion Regular title October 30, 2021 – April 16, 2022	Succeeded by Eimantas Stanionis
