= Yordan Frómeta =

Cuban boxer

Personal information
- Nationality: Cuban

Boxing career
- Stance: featherweight

Yordan Frómeta (Gendry), is a Cuban amateur boxer who has won U17 and junior world titles at featherweight.

== Career ==
At the U17 world championships 2005 he edged out Onur Sipal in the final. At the National senior championships 2006 he lost his semifinal to Luis Franco. At the World junior championships 2006 he defeated Hamza Kramou and narrowly beat US-American Sadam Ali and won again. In 2007 he moved up to lightweight but was outclassed by dominant 2005 world champion Yordenis Ugás.

== See also ==
Roniel Iglesias
