= Ramal Amanov =

Azerbaijani boxer (born 1984)

Personal information
- Nationality: Azerbaijani
- Born: Ramal Rəsul oğlu Amanov; Рамал Аманов; 13 September 1984 (age 41) Ganja, Azeri SSR, Soviet Union

Sport
- Country: Azerbaijan
- Sport: Boxing
Medal record
Boxing
Representing Azerbaijan
Men's Boxing
World Amateur Championships
Silver medal – second place	Mianyang 2005	Lightweight

Ramal Amanov (Azerbaijani: Ramal Rəsul oğlu Amanov, Russian: Рамал Аманов; born 13 September 1984) is an Azerbaijani boxer competing at lightweight.

== Career highlights ==
In the 2005 World Amateur Boxing Championships, Amanov won silver at lightweight, losing the final 28:42 to Cuban Yordenis Ugás having beaten one of the favorites Domenico Valentino of Italy 29:22 in the semifinal.

In 2006 Amanov won a gold medal in the Anwar Chowdhry Cup, defeating Aydin Selcuk of Turkey 37:28 in the final bout.

At the 2007 World Championships he defeated Daouda Sow but lost to eventual winner Frankie Gavin.
