= Kudratillo Abdukakhorov =

Uzbekistani boxer

Kudratillo Abdukakhorov Кудратилло Абдукахоров
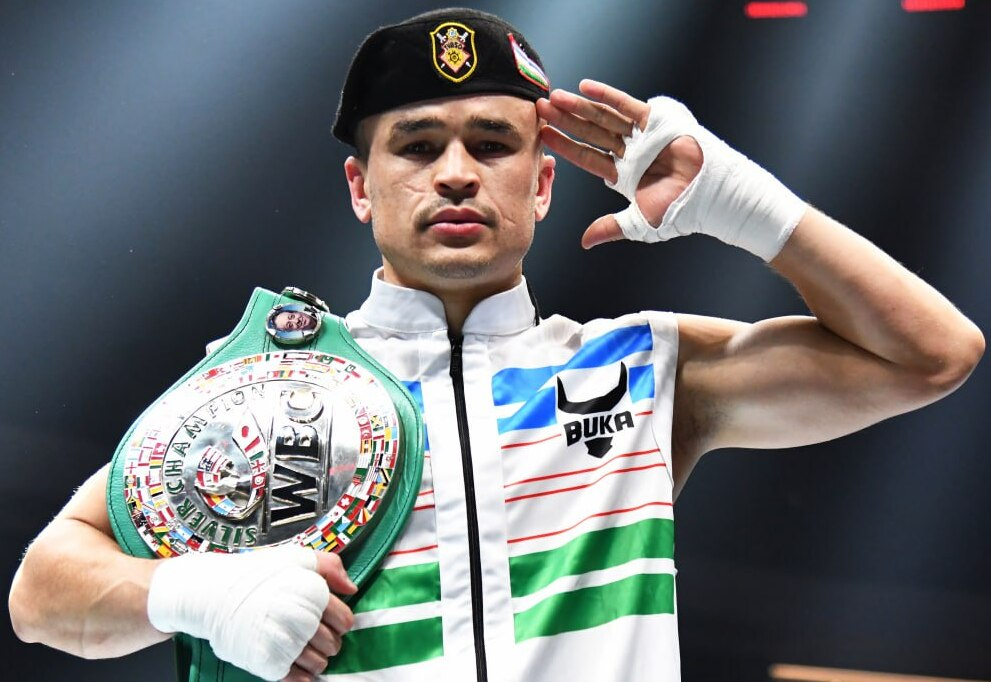

Personal information
- Nickname: Punisher
- Nationality: Uzbek
- Born: Kudratillo Abdukakhorov; 29 August 1993 (age 33) Qo‘rg‘ontepa, Andijan, Uzbekistan
- Height: 5 ft 9 1/2 in (177 cm)
- Weight: Welterweight

Boxing career
- Stance: Orthodox

Boxing record
- Total fights: 24
- Wins: 20
- Win by KO: 12
- Losses: 4

Kudratillo Abdukakhorov (Uzbek: Кудратилло Хабибулло Угли Абдукахоров; born 29 August 1993) is an Uzbek professional boxer, representative of the middleweight category who held the WBC "Silver" welterweight title from 2017 to 2018. In the mid-2010s, he performed among amateurs, bronze medalist of the national championship of Uzbekistan, participant of international tournaments.

== Amateur career ==
Abdukakhorov's first amateur fight took place in 2004. He was a four-time national champion as an amateur but he never represented his country in international competition. He holds a 280–50 record as an amateur.

== Professional career ==
Abdukakhorov made his professional debut on 18 October 2015. While still an active amateur boxer, in October 2015 Kudratillo Abdukakhorov successfully made his professional debut, winning against his opponent ahead of schedule already in the third round. At first, he performed exclusively at home, in particular, in March 2016, he won the vacant title of champion of Uzbekistan among professionals in the welterweight category, knocking out compatriot Islam Mirakhmedov. Some of Abdukakhorov's best fights and notable victories include wins over Charles Manyuchi, Keita Obara, Sherzodbek Alimjanov, Luis Collazo, Javier Flores, Idd Pialari, and Romeo Jakosalem.

Subsequently, he successfully performed in Singapore and Malaysia, became the owner of several regional titles, in particular, he was an international champion according to the World Boxing Foundation (WBF), a silver champion according to the Asian Boxing Council (ABCO), a silver champion according to the World Boxing Council (WBC). The last title was won by him in a duel with Zimbabwean Charles Manyuchi (20-2-1), whom Abdukakhorov defeated by technical knockout in the first round.

In March 2017, Abdukakhorov claimed the WBC "Silver" welterweight title against Charles Manyuchi.

In July 2017, at a tournament in Yekaterinburg, he met with Russian Dmitry Mikhailenko (22-1) — the confrontation between them lasted all the allotted 12 rounds, as a result, the judges unanimously gave the victory to Abdukakhorov, and he retained his WBC silver champion title.

In March 2018, he made the second defense of the championship belt, winning on points from the experienced Hungarian Laszlo Toth (25-3-1).

On October 18, 2019, he defeated the ex-world champion experienced American Luis Collazo. (39-7).

On June 25, 2020, it became known that Abdukakhorov would hold a title fight for the IBF interim welterweight champion belt with Sergey Lipinets. But the Uzbek withdrew from the fight due to problems with obtaining an American visa, and Canadian Custio Clayton took his place

On March 13, 2021, a 27-year old Kudratillo Abdukakhorov (17-0, 9 KO) fought Javier Flores in his 18th professional fight. He defeated Flores via 8th round RTD.

== Professional boxing record ==
24 fights	20 wins	4 losses
By knockout	12	0
By decision	8	4

No.	Result	Record	Opponent	Type	Round, time	Date	Location	Notes
24	Loss	20–4	Jorge Garcia Perez	UD	10	Dec 14 2024	Estadio Caliente, Tijuana, Mexico	
23	Loss	20–3	Andreas Katzourakis	MD	10	May 31, 2024	Red Owl Boxing Arena, Houston, Texas, U.S.	
22	Win	20–2	Maono Ally	KO	2 (8), 0:37	17 Nov 2023	Humo Arena, Tashkent, Uzbekistan	
21	Win	19–2	Juraboy Zokirov	RTD	3 (10), 3:00	5 Oct 2023	Circus, Tashkent, Uzbekistan	
20	Loss	18–2	Ve Shawn Owens	UD	10	25 Feb 2023	Armory, Minneapolis, Minnesota, U.S.	
19	Loss	18–1	Cody Crowley	UD	10	11 Dec 2021	Dignity Health Sports Park, Carson, California, US	
18	Win	18–0	Javier Flores	RTD	8 (10), 3:00	13 Mar 2021	Mohegan Sun Arena, Montville, Connecticut, US	
17	Win	17–0	Luis Collazo	TD	10 (10), 2:03	18 Oct 2019	Liacouras Center, Philadelphia, Pennsylvania, US	Unanimous TD after Collazo cut from accidental head clash
16	Win	16–0	Keita Obara	UD	12	30 Mar 2019	2300 Arena, Philadelphia, Pennsylvania, US	
15	Win	15–0	Twaha Kiduku	UD	12	5 May 2018	Sport Palace "Uzbekiston", Tashkent, Uzbekistan	
14	Win	14–0	Laszlo Toth	UD	12	17 Mar 2018	One City Grand Ballroom, Subang Jaya, Malaysia	Retained WBC Silver welterweight title
13	Win	13–0	Sherzodbek Alimjanov	RTD	2 (10), 3:00	18 Nov 2017	Yoshlik, Khonobod, Uzbekistan	
12	Win	12–0	Dmitri Mikhaylenko	UD	12	9 Jul 2017	DIVS, Ekaterinburg, Russia	Retained WBC Silver welterweight title
11	Win	11–0	Charles Manyuchi	TKO	1 (12), 2:56	25 Mar 2017	OCBC Arena, Singapore	Won WBC Silver welterweight title
10	Win	10–0	Idd Pialari	TKO	3 (12), 2:59	10 Feb 2017	Far East Square, Singapore	
9	Win	9–0	Romeo Jakosalem	TKO	5 (8), 1:35	7 Jan 2017	International Convention Center, Johor Bahru, Malaysia	
8	Win	8–0	Adones Cabalquinto	UD	12	23 Jul 2016	Far East Square, Singapore	Won vacant WBC–ABCO Silver welterweight title
7	Win	7–0	Larry Siwu	UD	8	10 Jun 2016	Futsing Association Commercial Building, Jalan Besar, Singapore	
6	Win	6–0	Juan Bedollo Arozco	UD	10	16 Apr 2016	One World Hotel, Petaling Jaya, Malaysia	Won vacant WBF International welterweight title
5	Win	5–0	Islam Miraxmedov	KO	3 (10), 1:30	5 Mar 2016	Sport Palace "Uzbekiston", Tashkent, Uzbekistan	Won vacant Uzbekistan welterweight title
4	Win	4–0	Jaba Shalutashvili	KO	3 (8)	16 Jan 2016	Sport Hall "Sahovat Sport", Tashkent, Uzbekistan	
3	Win	3–0	Abbos Maxammatyuldashev	KO	3 (8)	6 Dec 2015	Sport Hall "Sahovat Sport", Tashkent, Uzbekistan	
2	Win	2–0	Shohruh Bekmirzaev	KO	6 (8)	22 Nov 2015	Sport Hall "Lokomotiv", Tashkent, Uzbekistan	
1	Win	1–0	Timur Smirnov	TKO	5 (6)	18 Oct 2015	Sport Hall "Lokomotiv", Tashkent, Uzbekistan	
