= Jamal James =

American boxer (born 1988)

Personal information
- Nickname: Shango
- Born: July 27, 1988 (age 38) Minneapolis, Minnesota, U.S.
- Height: 6 ft 2 in (188 cm)
- Weight: Welterweight

Boxing career
- Reach: 70 in (178 cm)
- Stance: Orthodox

Boxing record
- Total fights: 30
- Wins: 28
- Win by KO: 12
- Losses: 2

Jamal James (born July 27, 1988) is an American professional boxer who held the WBA (Regular) welterweight title from 2020 to 2021.

== Amateur career ==
As an amateur James represented Circle of Discipline boxing club in Minneapolis. In his final year as an amateur (2009), he was runner-up in two national tournaments: the National Golden Gloves and the Police Athletic League (PAL). James would have more than 150 fights as an amateur.

== Professional career ==
James made his professional debut with a third-round technical knockout (TKO) win against Justin Danforth at Shooting Star Casino in Mahnomen, Minnesota, on May 22, 2010.

Between September 2015 and December 2017 he fought six times, against opponents with a combined record of 138–13–2, winning five times. The only loss in his career so far came against 2005 amateur world champion and 2008 Olympic bronze medalist Yordenis Ugas.

=== James vs. DeMarco ===
On July 13, 2019, James faced Antonio DeMarco in a final eliminator for the WBA interim welterweight title at Minneapolis Armory in Minneapolis, Minnesota. He won by unanimous decision, with all three judges scoring the fight 98-92.

=== James vs. Dulorme ===
In his next bout, James faced Thomas Dulorme, ranked #10 by the WBA at welterweight, for the vacant WBA interim welterweight belt at Microsoft Theater in Los Angeles, California on August 8, 2020. James won the fight via unanimous decision, 117-111, 116-112 and 115-113 on the scorecards to win the WBA interim welterweight belt.

In February 2021, the WBA elevated James from "interim" to "World" titlist, which made James the holder of the WBA Regular welterweight belt.

=== James vs. Butaev ===
In his first official title defence, James faced the #4 ranked Radzhab Butaev at Michelob Ultra Arena in Paradise, Nevada. He lost the bout via a ninth-round technical knockout.

== Professional boxing record ==
| 30 fights | 28 wins | 2 losses |
|---|---|---|
| By knockout | 12 | 1 |
| By decision | 16 | 1 |

| No. | Result | Record | Opponent | Type | Round, time | Date | Location | Notes |
|---|---|---|---|---|---|---|---|---|
| 30 | Win | 28–2 | (Argentina) Alberto Palmetta | UD | 10 | Feb 25, 2023 | (United States) Minneapolis Armory, Minneapolis, Minnesota, U.S. | |
| 29 | Loss | 27–2 | Radzhab Butaev | TKO | 9 (12), 2:12 | Oct 30, 2021 | Michelob Ultra Arena, Paradise, Nevada, US | Lost WBA (Regular) welterweight title |
| 28 | Win | 27–1 | Thomas Dulorme | UD | 12 | Aug 8, 2020 | Microsoft Theater, Los Angeles, California, U.S. | Won vacant WBA interim welterweight title |
| 27 | Win | 26–1 | Antonio DeMarco | UD | 10 | Jul 13, 2019 | Minneapolis Armory, Minneapolis, Minnesota, U.S. | |
| 26 | Win | 25–1 | Janer Gonzalez | RTD | 6 (10), 3:00 | Feb 23, 2019 | Minneapolis Armory, Minneapolis, Minnesota, U.S. | |
| 25 | Win | 24–1 | Mahonry Montes | KO | 2 (10), 2:58 | Aug 24, 2018 | Minneapolis Armory, Minneapolis, Minnesota, U.S. | |
| 24 | Win | 23–1 | Abel Ramos | MD | 10 | Apr 13, 2018 | Minneapolis Armory, Minneapolis, Minnesota, U.S. | |
| 23 | Win | 22–1 | Diego Chaves | KO | 3 (10), 2:12 | Dec 15, 2017 | Pioneer Event Center, Lancaster, California, U.S. | |
| 22 | Win | 21–1 | Jo Jo Dan | UD | 10 | Jul 15, 2017 | Nassau Coliseum, Uniondale, New York, U.S. | |
| 21 | Loss | 20–1 | Yordenis Ugás | UD | 10 | Aug 12, 2016 | Turning Stone Resort & Casino, Verona, New York, U.S. | |
| 20 | Win | 20–0 | Wale Omotoso | SD | 10 | Jul 16, 2016 | Legacy Arena, Birmingham, Alabama, U.S. | |
| 19 | Win | 19–0 | Javier Molina | UD | 10 | Jan 19, 2016 | Club Nokia, Los Angeles, California, U.S. | |
| 18 | Win | 18–0 | Juan Carlos Abreu | UD | 10 | Sep 18, 2015 | Full Sail University, Winter Park, Florida, U.S. | |
| 17 | Win | 17–0 | Michael Balasi | UD | 8 | Jun 27, 2015 | Sands Bethlehem Event Center, Bethlehem, Pennsylvania, U.S. | |
| 16 | Win | 16–0 | Daniel Sostre | KO | 2 (8), 0:57 | Apr 18, 2015 | Valley Forge Casino and Resort, Valley Forge, Pennsylvania, U.S. | |
| 15 | Win | 15–0 | Cameron Krael | KO | 8 (8) | Nov 1, 2014 | UIC Pavilion, Chicago, Illinois, U.S. | |
| 14 | Win | 14–0 | Wayne Martell | TKO | 1 (10) | Aug 22, 2014 | Grand Casino, Hinckley, Minnesota, U.S. | |
| 13 | Win | 13–0 | Angel Hernandez | UD | 8 | Mar 28, 2014 | Grand Casino, Hinckley, Minnesota, U.S. | |
| 12 | Win | 12–0 | Colby Courter | TKO | 4 (6) | Jan 24, 2014 | Grand Casino, Hinckley, Minnesota, U.S. | |
| 11 | Win | 11–0 | Mohammed Kayongo | UD | 8 | Sep 21, 2013 | Convention Center, Minneapolis, Minnesota, U.S. | Won vacant Minnesota State welterweight title |
| 10 | Win | 10–0 | Robert Osiobe | UD | 8 | Aug 16, 2013 | Grand Casino, Hinckley, Minnesota, U.S. | |
| 9 | Win | 9–0 | Patrick Boozer | UD | 6 | Jan 5, 2013 | Hyatt Regency Hotel, Minneapolis, Minnesota, U.S. | |
| 8 | Win | 8–0 | Corey Rodriguez | TD | 7 (8) | Oct 27, 2012 | Canterbury Park, Shakopee, Minnesota, U.S. | Technical decision due to accidental clash of heads |
| 7 | Win | 7–0 | Charon Spain | TKO | 1 (6) | Aug 25, 2012 | Crown Plaza Hotel, Saint Paul, Minnesota, U.S. | |
| 6 | Win | 6–0 | Hector Orozco | UD | 6 | Jun 23, 2012 | Black Bear Casino, Carlton, Minnesota, U.S. | |
| 5 | Win | 5–0 | Hector Orozco | UD | 6 | May 20, 2011 | Grand Casino, Hinckley, Minnesota, U.S. | |
| 4 | Win | 4–0 | Justin Danforth | TKO | 2 (4) | Feb 26, 2011 | Grand Casino, Hinckley, Minnesota, U.S. | |
| 3 | Win | 3–0 | Ryan Gronvold | TKO | 1 (4) | Dec 18, 2010 | Target Center, Minneapolis, Minnesota, U.S. | |
| 2 | Win | 2–0 | Wes Ronchi | KO | 1 (4) | Nov 5, 2010 | Scheels Arena, Fargo, North Dakota, U.S. | |
| 1 | Win | 1–0 | Justin Danforth | TKO | 3 (4) | May 22, 2010 | Shooting Star Casino, Mahnomen, Minnesota, U.S. | |

Sporting positions
Regional boxing titles
| Vacant Title last held by Les Bagi | Minnesota State welterweight champion September 21, 2013 – January 2014 | Vacant |
World boxing titles
| Vacant Title last held by David Avanesyan | WBA welterweight interim champion August 8, 2020 – February 4, 2021; Promoted | Vacant Title next held by Gabriel Maestre |
| Vacant Title last held by Yordenis Ugás | WBA welterweight champion Regular title February 4, 2021 – October 30, 2021 | Succeeded by Radzhab Butaev |
