= Aston Palicte =

Filipino boxer

Personal information
- Nickname: Mighty
- Nationality: Filipino
- Born: 25 January 1991 (age 35) Bago, Negros Occidental, Philippines
- Height: 1.70 m (5 ft 7 in)
- Weight: Flyweight; Super-flyweight

Boxing career
- Reach: 1.76 m (69 in)
- Stance: Orthodox

Boxing record
- Total fights: 35
- Wins: 28
- Win by KO: 23
- Losses: 6
- Draws: 1

Aston Palicte (born 25 January 1991) is a Filipino professional boxer who challenged for the WBO super flyweight title twice between 2018 and 2019.

== Professional career ==
On September 8, 2018, he fought Donnie Nietes for the vacant WBO super flyweight title at the Superfly 3 event, with the bout ending in a draw.

On June 19, 2019, he lost to Kazuto Ioka for the vacant WBO super flyweight world title.

== Professional boxing record ==
35 fights	28 wins	6 losses
By knockout	23	4
By decision	5	2
Draws	1	

No.	Result	Record	Opponent	Type	Round, Time	Date	Location	Notes
35	Loss	28–6–1	José Salas	TKO	4 (10) 1:30	Jul 29, 2023	T-Mobile Arena, Las Vegas, U.S.	
34	Loss	28–5–1	Jason Moloney	TKO	3 (10) 2:35	Jun 5, 2022	Marvel Stadium, Docklands, Melbourne, Australia	For WBC Silver and vacant WBO International bantamweight titles
33	Win	28–4–1	Roland Jay Biendima	UD	10	Oct 29, 2021	SanMan Gym, General Santos City, Philippines	
32	Win	27–4–1	Reymark Taday	RTD	2 (8) 3:00	Nov 21, 2020	SanMan Gym, General Santos City, Philippines	
31	Win	26–4–1	Jonathan Francisco	TKO	2 (8)	Feb 29, 2020	Lagao Gym, General Santos City, Philippines	
30	Loss	25–4–1	Renz Rosia	UD	8	Dec 21, 2019	Manila Arena, Manila, Philippines	
29	Loss	25–3–1	Kazuto Ioka	TKO	10 (12) 1:46	Jun 19, 2019	Makuhari Messe, Chiba City, Japan	For vacant WBO super flyweight title
28	Win	25–2–1	Jose L. Martinez-Mercado	KO	2 (12) 2:18	Jan 31, 2019	Viejas Casino & Resort, Alpine, U.S.	
27	Draw	24–2–1	Donnie Nietes	SD	12	Sep 8, 2018	Forum, Inglewood, U.S.	For vacant WBO super flyweight title
26	Win	24–2	José Alfredo Rodríguez	TKO	5 (10) 0:45	Dec 8, 2017	Round Rock Sports Center, Round Rock, U.S.	Retained NABF super flyweight title
25	Win	23–2	John Mark Apolinario	TKO	(8) 2:01	Jun 10, 2017	Robinson's Mall Atrium, General Santos City, Philippines	
24	Win	22–2	Oscar Cantu	SD	10	Dec 17, 2016	Downtown Las Vegas Event Center, Als Vegas, U.S.	Won NABF and vacant WBO Inter-continental super flyweight titles
23	Win	21–2	Vergiloo Silvano	KO	7 (12) 2:42	Jun 24, 2016	Jurado Hall of the Philippines Marine Corp, Barangay Fort Bonifac, Taguig City, Philippines	Won vacant IBF Pan Pacific super flyweight title
22	Loss	20–2	Junior Granados	SD	10	Mar 12, 2016	Polyforum Zam Ná, Merida, Mexico	
21	Win	20–1	Vergilio Silvano	UD	12	Nov 13, 2015	Philippines Navy Gymnasium Bonifacio Naval Station (BNS), Taguig City, Philippines	Won vacant WBO Oriental super flyweight title
20	Win	19–1	Fernando Ocon	RTD	4 (10) 3:00	Aug 14, 2015	SM City Annex, Ecoland, Davao City, Philippines	
19	Win	18–1	Michael Escobia	KO	3 (10) 3:00	May 30, 2015	Lagao Gym, General Santos City, Philippines	
18	Win	17–1	Ismael Garnica	TKO	7 (10) 2:19	Mar 7, 2015	Cotai Arena, Venetian Resort, Macao, Macau	
17	Win	16–1	Detnarong Omkrathok	KO	1 (12) 2:11	Jan 31, 2015	University of SouthEastern Philippines Gymnasium, Barrio Obrera, Davao City, Philippines	
16	Win	15–1	Gerpaul Valero	KO	1 (10) 1:22	Nov 8, 2014	Almendras Gym, Davao City, Philippines	
15	Win	14–1	Frans Damur Palue	TKO	1 (10) 2:37	Aug 23, 2014	Almendras Gym, Davao City, Philippines	
14	Win	13–1	Robel Villegas	KO	1 (10) 1:02	May 3, 2014	University of SouthEastern Philippines Gymnasium, Barrio Obrero, Davao City, Philippines	
13	Win	12–1	Michael Bastasa	TKO	1 (8) 1:33	Feb 8, 2014	Almendras Gym, Davao City, Philippines	
12	Win	11–1	Lowell Saguisa	KO	3 (8) 1:00	Aug 30, 2013	Lucena City Recreational Gym, Lucena City, Philippines	
11	Loss	10–1	Romnick Magos	RTD	4 (10) 3:00	Dec 1, 2012	Bonifacio Naval Station (BNS) Covered Court, Barangay Fort Bonif, Taguig City, Philippines	For vacant WBO Asia Pacific Youth flyweight title
10	Win	10–0	Mark Joseph Costa	KO	1 (10) 0:59	Aug 16, 2012	Mandaluyong Gym, Mandaluyong Sports Center, Mandaluyong City, Philippines	
9	Win	9–0	Gerald Ubatay	RTD	2 (8) 3:00	May 13, 2012	Yñares Sports Center, Pasig City, Philippines	
8	Win	8–0	Alie Laurel	SD	8	Dec 11, 2011	Yñares Sports Arena, Pasig City, Philippines	
7	Win	7–0	Mark Vito	TKO	1 (8) 2:54	Oct 29, 2011	Planet Jupiter Boxing Gym, Makati City, Philippines	
6	Win	6–0	Ricky Oyan	KO	1 (8) 1:43	Aug 6, 2011	Stotsenberg Hotel & Convention Center, Clarkfield, Angeles City, Philippines	
5	Win	5–0	Erwin Picardal	TKO	1 (6) 0:25	Mar 7, 2011	Planet Jupiter Boxing Gym, Makati City, Philippines	
4	Win	4–0	Leo de Guia	TKO	5 (6) 2:12	Feb 11 2011	Planet Jupiter Boxing Gym, Makati City, Philippines	
3	Win	3–0	Jessie Blanca	SD	6	Dec 11, 2010	Balibago Sports Complex, Barangay Balibago, Santa Rosa City, Philippines	
2	Win	2–0	Argie Toquero	TKO	1 (4) 2:01	Sep 11 2010	Saint Niño Plaza, Barangay Poblacion, Muntinlupa City, Philippines	
1	Win	1–0	Jomar Yema	TKO	1 (4) 2:54	Aug 23, 2010	Arayata Sports Complex, Tanza, Philippines	Professional Debut
