= Errol Spence Jr. vs. Yordenis Ugás =

Boxing match

- Date: April 16, 2022
- Venue: AT&T Stadium, Arlington, Texas, U.S.
- Title(s) on the line: WBA (Super), WBC, and IBF welterweight titles

Tale of the tape
Boxer	Errol Spence Jr.	Yordenis Ugás
Nickname	"The Truth"	"54 Milagros" ("54 Miracles")
Hometown	Dallas, Texas, U.S.	Santiago de Cuba, Cuba
Pre-fight record	27–0 (21 KO)	27–4 (12 KO)
Age	32 years, 1 month	35 years, 9 months
Height	5 ft 9 in (175 cm)	5 ft 9 1/2 in (177 cm)
Weight	146 1/4 lb (66 kg)	146 3/4 lb (67 kg)
Style	Southpaw	Orthodox
Recognition	WBC and IBF; Welterweight Champion; TBRB; No. 1 Ranked Welterweight; The Ring; No. 2 Ranked Welterweight; The Ring No. 5 ranked pound-for-pound fighter	WBA (Super); Welterweight Champion; The Ring/TBRB; No. 3 Ranked Welterweight

Result
- Spence Jr. wins via 10th round TKO

Errol Spence Jr. vs. Yordenis Ugás was a professional boxing match contested on April 16, 2022, for the WBC, WBA and IBF welterweight championship.

== Background ==
On May 21, 2021, it was reported that unified welterweight champion Errol Spence Jr. and eight-division world champion Manny Pacquiao had signed contracts to face each other on August 21 in Las Vegas. However, on August 10, Spence was forced to pull out, after suffering a retinal tear to his left eye. He was replaced by WBA champion Yordenis Ugás who defeated Pacquiao by unanimous decision.

After successfully defending his title against Pacquiao, Ugás petitioned the WBA for a special permit to bypass a mandatory defense against Eimantas Stanionis in order to face a recovered Spence in a unification bout. This was denied by the WBA on October 20 who stated that: "...we are in special circumstances to resolve extraordinary situations, such as the champion reduction in every division to have only one champion". Accordingly, Ugás and Stanionis were given a 30-day period to negotiate the terms of their bout. As they were unable to come to terms, a purse bid was ordered for December 9, with a minimal bid of $200,000. The winning bid would be split 75/25 in favor of Ugas as the reigning titlist. On December 19, WBA President Gilberto Mendoza Jr. confirmed that Stanionis was willing to step aside and such Spence-Ugás could go ahead.

The bout was officially announced on February 8, 2022 and was scheduled to headline a Showtime pay per view card on April 16 at the AT&T Stadium in Arlington, Texas. Stanionis would face WBA regular titleholder Radzhab Butaev on the undercard.

== The fight ==
Spence won the fight by a tenth-round technical knockout. The fight was stopped on the advice of the ringside physician, due to Ugás’ severely swollen right eye. Spence was leading on all three of the judges' scorecards at the time of the stoppage, with scores of 88–82, 88–82 and 88–83.

Spence landed 216 of 784 (27.6%) punches thrown compared to Ugás landing 96 of 541 (17.7%).

== Aftermath ==
Speaking after bout Spence said "Everybody knows who I want next; I want Terence Crawford next. That's the fight that I want; that's the fight everybody else wants. Terence, I'm coming for that motherfucking belt."

== Fight card ==
Confirmed bouts:

Weight class		vs.		Method	Round	Time	Notes
Welterweight	(United States) Errol Spence Jr. (c)	def.	(Cuba) Yordenis Ugás (c)	TKO	10/12	1:44	^{Note 1}
Lightweight	(Mexico) Isaac Cruz	def.	(Cuba) Yuriorkis Gamboa	TKO	5/10	1:32	^{Note 2}
Lightweight	(United States) José Valenzuela	def.	(Mexico) Francisco Vargas	KO	1/10	1:25	^{Note 3}
Welterweight	(Canada) Cody Crowley	def.	(United States) Josesito López	UD	10/10
Welterweight	(Lithuania) Eimantas Stanionis	def.	(Russia) Radzhab Butaev (c)	SD	12/12		^{Note 4}
Light welterweight	(United States) Brandun Lee	def.	(Puerto Rico) Zachary Ochoa	UD	10/10

^Note1 For WBA (Super), WBC, and IBF welterweight titles
^Note2 For vacant WBO Inter-Continental lightweight title
^Note3 For vacant WBC Continental Americas lightweight title
^Note4 For WBA (Regular) welterweight title

== Broadcasting ==
The bout was broadcast live on Showtime, on pay-per-view.

Country	Broadcaster
Panama	Telemetro
United States	Showtime

Preceded by vs. Danny Garcia	Errol Spence Jr.'s bouts 16 April 2022	Succeeded by vs. Terence Crawford
Preceded by vs. Manny Pacquiao	Yordenis Ugás's bouts 16 April 2022	Succeeded by vs. Mario Barrios
