= Charles Manyuchi =

Zimbabwean boxer

Personal information
- Born: November 19, 1989 (age 36) Bulawayo, Zimbabwe
- Height: 5 ft 9 in (175 cm)
- Weight: Welterweight; Light middleweight; Middleweight

Boxing career
- Stance: Orthodox

Boxing record
- Total fights: 34
- Wins: 29
- Win by KO: 18
- Losses: 4
- Draws: 1

Charles Manyuchi (born 19 November 1989) is a Zimbabwean professional boxer who briefly held the WBC Silver welterweight title.

== Professional career ==
Manyuchi made his professional debut in 2009, and won the ABU welterweight title in 2013. In 2014, he won the WBC International welterweight title against Patrick Allotey. He successfully defended his WBC crown in Lusaka against Devis Caceres. He was awarded the Zimbabwe's Sports Person of the Year accolade in 2014. He made another successful defense of the WBC International belt against Gianluca Frezza, in the latter's native Italy.

Manyuchi further advanced his career by beating Dmitry Mikhailenko in Yekaterinburg for the WBC Silver title. Manyuchi won the fight by unanimous decision (118–110, 116–114, 115–113). Manyuchi's run of 17 consecutive victories came to an end against Kudratillo Abdukakhorov. Abdukakhorov proved to be too much for Manyuchi, beating him with a first round technical knockout (TKO) after dropping him twice. Manyuchi mocked Abduqaxorov prior to the fight, saying that he was "in a different league" while his manager claimed they were already planning to fight for the WBC world title. Abdukakhorov claimed Manyuchi was "overconfident".

Manyuchi has since gone into the middleweight division and he is the current WBF Middleweight Champion after knocking out Argentina's Diego Gallardo in Harare.

== Professional boxing record ==
| 34 fights | 29 wins | 4 losses |
|---|---|---|
| By knockout | 18 | 1 |
| By decision | 11 | 3 |
| Draws | 1 | |

| No. | Result | Record | Opponent | Type | Round, time | Date | Location | Notes |
|---|---|---|---|---|---|---|---|---|
| 34 | Win | 29–4–1 | Donald Kampamba | UD | 8 (8) | 2023-12-16 | Government Complex, Lusaka, Zambia | |
| 33 | Win | 28–4–1 | Mussa Mkwanda | TKO | 2 (8) | 2023-11-25 | Heritage Village, Harare, Zimbabwe | |
| 32 | Win | 27–4–1 | Alick Gogodo | TKO | 1 (6) | 2023-11-18 | Phil-Jen Country Lodge, Chivhu, Zimbabwe | |
| 31 | Win | 26–4–1 | Limbani Lano | TKO | 5 (10) | 2023-07-28 | Phil-Jen Country Lodge, Chivhu, Zimbabwe | |
| 30 | Win | 25–4–1 | Muhamad Sebyala | UD | 12 (12) | 2021-07-03 | Flamboyant hotel, Masvingo, Zimbabwe | Retained WBF middleweight title |
| 29 | Win | 24–4–1 | Diego Diaz Gallardo | TKO | 3 (12) | 2019-09-28 | International Conference Center, Harare, Zimbabwe | Won WBF middleweight title |
| 28 | Win | 23–4–1 | Pablo Ezequiel Acosta | KO | 5 (12) | 2019-05-25 | International Conference Center, Harare, Zimbabwe | |
| 27 | Loss | 22–4–1 | Magomed Kurbanov | UD | 10 (10) | 2018-08-19 | DIVS, Yekaterinburg, Russia | |
| 26 | Win | 22–3–1 | Karage Suba | TKO | 1 (10) | 2018-04-28 | City Mall, Solwezi, Zambia | |
| 25 | Win | 21–3–1 | Sherif Kasongo | UD | 8 (8) | 2017-07-02 | Zmart Mall, Ndola, Zambia | |
| 24 | Loss | 20–3–1 | Kudratillo Abdukakhorov | TKO | 1 (12) | 2017-03-25 | OCBC Arena, Kallang, Singapore | Lost WBC Silver welterweight title |
| 23 | Win | 20–2–1 | Jose Agustin Julio | KO | 1 (8) | 2016-10-14 | International Conference Center, Harare, Zimbabwe | |
| 22 | Win | 19–2–1 | Deo Samwel | UD | 8 (8) | 2016-08-27 | Government Complex, Lusaka, Zambia | |
| 21 | Win | 18–2–1 | Dmitry Mikhaylenko | UD | 12 (12) | 2016-05-06 | DIVS, Yekaterinburg, Russia | Won vacant WBC Silver welterweight title |
| 20 | Win | 17–2–1 | Gianluca Frezza | TKO | 6 (12) | 2015-07-18 | Sequals, Italy | Retained WBC International welterweight title |
| 19 | Win | 16–2–1 | Ibrahim Class Mgender | TKO | 1 (10) | 2015-05-02 | Mulungushi Conference Centre, Lusaka, Zambia | |
| 18 | Win | 15–2–1 | Deivis Casseres | TKO | 2 (12) | 2014-11-22 | Government Complex, Lusaka, Zambia | Retained WBC International welterweight title |
| 17 | Win | 14–2–1 | Patrick Allotey | TKO | 8 (12) | 2014-03-15 | Government Complex, Lusaka, Zambia | Won vacant WBC International welterweight title |
| 16 | Win | 13–2–1 | Isaac Sowah | TKO | 3 (12) | 2013-09-28 | Mulungushi Conference Centre, Lusaka, Zambia | Retained ABU welterweight title |
| 15 | Win | 12–2–1 | Patrice Sou Toke | TKO | 5 (12) | 2013-06-28 | Le palais des Sports de Ouaga 2000, Ouagadougou, Burkina Faso | Won ABU welterweight title |
| 14 | Win | 11–2–1 | Mbiya Kanku | TKO | 10 (10) | 2013-05-11 | Arthur Davies Stadium, Kitwe, Zambia | |
| 13 | Win | 10–2–1 | Osgood Kayuni | UD | 10 (10) | 2013-03-23 | Government Complex, Lusaka, Zambia | |
| 12 | Win | 9–2–1 | Dyson Mwisa | UD | 8 (8) | 2012-10-20 | Government Complex, Lusaka, Zambia | |
| 11 | Draw | 8–2–1 | Anthony Jarmann | MD | 4 (4) | 2012-10-12 | Windhoek Country Club Resort, Windhoek, Namibia | |
| 10 | Win | 8–2 | Silas Mandeya | RTD | 3 (8) | 2012-06-30 | Masvingo, Zimbabwe | |
| 9 | Win | 7–2 | Mordechai Donga | UD | 6 (6) | 2011-06-03 | Large City Hall, Bulawayo, Zimbabwe | |
| 8 | Win | 6–2 | Isaya Chilufya | UD | 6 (6) | 2011-01-29 | Mulungushi Conference Centre, Lusaka, Zambia | |
| 7 | Win | 5–2 | Clemence Mutiyale | KO | 1 (8) | 2010-12-04 | Ochi City Safari Lodge, Harare, Zimbabwe | |
| 6 | Win | 4–2 | Farai Kachigwada | TKO | 6 (6) | 2010-07-24 | Mbare Netball Complex, Harare, Zimbabwe | |
| 5 | Loss | 3–2 | Page Tshesane | PTS | 10 (10) | 2010-04-16 | Emalahleni Civic Centre, Witbank, South Africa | |
| 4 | Win | 3–1 | Silas Mandeya | TKO | 4 (6) | 2010-03-13 | Masvingo Civic Centre, Masvingo, Zimbabwe | |
| 3 | Loss | 2–1 | Mordechai Donga | PTS | 12 (12) | 2009-07-25 | Raylton Sports Club, Harare, Zimbabwe | For vacant Zimbabwean light-middleweight title |
| 2 | Win | 2–0 | Edison Kandukwa | MD | 6 (6) | 2009-07-04 | Nampower Convention Centre, Windhoek, Namibia | |
| 1 | Win | 1–0 | Isaac Phonkeni | UD | 4 (4) | 2009-02-14 | Raylton Sports Club, Harare, Zimbabwe | |

== See also ==
- List of male boxers

Sporting positions
Regional boxing titles
| Preceded by Patrice Sou Toke | ABU welterweight champion 28 June 2013 – 2014; Vacated | Vacant Title next held by Larry Ekundayo |
| Vacant Title last held by Shane Mosley | WBC International welterweight champion 15 March 2014 – 2015; Vacated | Vacant Title next held by Sam Eggington |
| Vacant Title last held by Amir Khan | WBC Silver welterweight champion 6 May 2016 – 25 March 2017 | Succeeded by Kudratillo Abdukakhorov |
Minor world boxing titles
| Preceded by Diego Diaz Gallardo | WBF middleweight champion 28 September 2019 – 2022; Vacated | Vacant Title next held by Arjon Kajoshi |
