= Eimantas Grakauskas =

Lithuanian jurist and politician

Eimantas Grakauskas (born 1 September 1947) is a Lithuanian jurist and politician. In 1990 he was among those who signed the Act of the Re-Establishment of the State of Lithuania.
