= Yordenis Ugás =

Cuban-American boxer (born 1986)

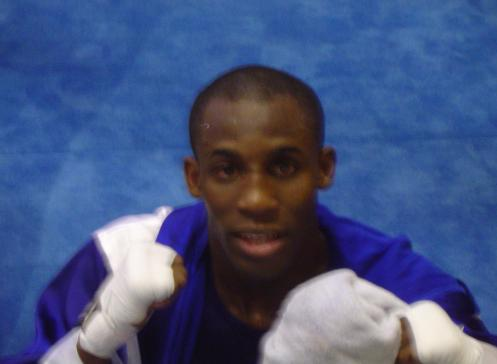
- Ugás at the 2008 Summer Olympics

Personal information
- Nickname: 54 Milagros ("54 Miracles")
- Born: 14 July 1986 (age 40) Santiago de Cuba, Cuba
- Height: 5 ft 9 1/2 in (177 cm)
- Weight: Light welterweight; Welterweight

Boxing career
- Reach: 73 1/2 in (187 cm)
- Stance: Orthodox

Boxing record
- Total fights: 33
- Wins: 27
- Win by KO: 12
- Losses: 6
Medal record
Representing Cuba
Men's amateur boxing
Olympic Games
Bronze medal – third place	2008 Beijing	Lightweight
Central American and Caribbean Games
Gold medal – first place	2006 Cartagena	Lightweight
Pan American Games
Gold medal – first place	2007 Rio	Lightweight
Pan American Championships
Gold medal – first place	2005 Teresopolis	Lightweight
Silver medal – second place	2008 Cuenca	Lightweight
Strandzha Cup
Silver medal – second place	2008 Plovdiv	Lightweight
World Championships
Gold medal – first place	2005 Mianyang	Lightweight
World Cadet Championships
Gold medal – first place	2003 Bucharest	Lightweight
World Cup
Silver medal – second place	2005 Moscow	Lightweight
Gold medal – first place	2006 Baku	Lightweight

Yordenis Ugás Hernández (born 14 July 1986) is a Cuban professional boxer. He held the WBA (Super) welterweight title from 2021 to April 2022, having previously held the WBA (Regular) title from 2020 until being elevated to Super champion. As an amateur, Ugás won a gold medal at the 2005 World Championships and bronze at the 2008 Olympics, both in the lightweight division.

Ugas' nickname, 54 Milagros, comes from two people: "54" refers to baseball player Aroldis Chapman who wears the number 54, and is Ugas' best friend; "Milagros" is the name of Ugas' mother.

== Amateur career ==
Ugás was U17 (cadets) world champion in 2003 but lost at the junior championships in 2004 to Amir Khan. On other occasions he lost twice to countryman Luis Franco at featherweight, he finished third at the nationals 2004 at featherweight.

In 2005 he moved up to lightweight where he was more successful, winning the Cuban Championships from 2005 to 2008 and turning into a star. He won a tournament called PanAm Championships (not the PanAm Games) in 2005, however in other tournaments he lost twice to Kazach southpaw Serik Sapiyev.

At the Senior World Championships 2005 he suffered two heavy knockdowns against Canadian southpaw Ibrahim Kamal in his third fight but managed to win. The Manila Times writes: "But for two fleeting moments Thursday, unheralded Canadian lightweight Ibrahim Kamal showed the world that the Cubans, arguably the number-one force in amateur boxing, may have jaws of glass after all. The University of Toronto student knocked down Yordanis Ugás in the first and second rounds with two sledgehammer lefts to the side of the chin. But then the Canadian southpaw hurt one knee as he and Ugás wrestled each other to the floor on the third round, leaving him effectively fighting on one leg." Later Ugás beat Russian Khabib Allakhverdiyev and in the final he outfought Romal Amanov from Azerbaijan. Cubanet.org writes "Yordenis Ugás, a sharp, technically accomplished fighter but with a suspect jaw, won the lightweight gold for Cuba after an explosive toe-to-toe clash with Romal Amanov of Azerbaijan." It describes him as "a tall, bony lightweight with a deceptively languid fighting style."

In 2006 he won the Central American Championships.

He was part of the Cuban national team that won the 2006 Boxing World Cup.

In 2007 he beat Yordan Frometa and Roniel Iglesias at the national championships. Later that year Ugás won the PanAm Games in Rio beating Darleys Pérez and Éverton Lopes. Cuba didn't participate in the World Championships in Chicago.

In 2008 he defended the national championships against old foe Luis Franco and won his Olympic qualifier. In Beijing he was upset in the semifinal by Frenchman Daouda Sow.

In 2009 he went up to junior welterweight beating Roniel Iglesias in the national final.

In March 2010, Ugás moved to the United States in the hope of beginning a professional career. On 9 July 2010, he made his pro debut.

Ugás moved to North Bergen, New Jersey in 2012.

=== Olympic Games ===
- 2008 in Beijing, China (as a lightweight)
  - Defeated Hamza Kramou (Algeria) 21–3
  - Defeated Domenico Valentino (Italy) 10–2
  - Defeated Georgian Popescu (Romania) 11–7
  - Lost to Daouda Sow (France) 8–15

=== World Championships ===
- 2005
  - Defeated Fayzuloyev Marufyon (Tajikistan) 28–14
  - Defeated Asghar Ali Shar (Pakistan) 28–14
  - Defeated Ibrahim Kamal (Canada) 23–14
  - Defeated Jong Sub-Baik (South Korea) 34–16
  - Defeated Khabib Allakhverdiyev (Russia) 45–22
  - Defeated Romal Amanov (Azerbaijan) 42–28

=== World Cup ===
- 2005 in Moscow, Russia (as a lightweight)
  - Defeated Pichai Sayotha (Thailand) 45–12
  - Defeated Georgian Popescu (Romania) RSC-3
  - Lost to Serik Sapiyev (Kazakhstan) 35–46
  - Defeated Murat Khrachev (Russia) 50–30

=== Cuban National Championship ===
- 2003 (featherweight)
  - Defeated Yosbel Melgarejo RSCO 2
  - Defeated Yudenis Gonzalez 35–31
  - Defeated Sander Rodriguez 21–7
  - Lost to Yosvani Aguilera 5–17 (2nd place)
- 2004 (featherweight)
  - Defeated Alexios Barrios 3–2
  - Defeated Lester Diaz 18–9
  - Lost to Luis Franco 13–13 54–65 (semifinal)
- 2005 (lightweight)
  - Defeated Ceilan Varona 17–4
  - Defeated Yosbel Melarejo 13–5
  - Defeated Michel Sarria Mendez 20–10
  - Defeated Raudel Sanchez (Cuba) 15–6
- 2006 (lightweight)
  - Defeated José Agramonte RSCO 2
  - Defeated Victor Perez walkover
  - Defeated Yoandri Lomba 23–7
  - Defeated Michel Sarria Mendez 25–9
- 2007 (lightweight)
  - Defeated Frank Isla RSC 2
  - Defeated Yordan Frometa RSCO 3 21–1
  - Defeated Jorge Moiran 15–5
  - Defeated Julio Cesar Figueredo 25–1
  - Defeated Roniel Iglesias 21–8
- 2008 (lightweight)
  - Defeated Onelis Perez 20–0
  - Defeated Luis Franco 14–4
  - Defeated Eldris Terrero 14–5
  - Defeated Pablo de la Cruz 17–3

== Professional career ==
=== Early career ===
On 9 March 2019, Ugás fought his first career title fight against Shawn Porter for the WBC welterweight title. Ugás fought great and landed the cleaner shots throughout the fight. Porter had some success with his jab in the fourth round, but Ugás was the better man in the following round, after both fighters exchanged shots in the middle of the ring towards the end of the fifth. Ugás also had a stronger finish to the fight, and managed to cut Porter near his left eye in the tenth. After the final bell rang, Ugás' team already started celebrating, while Porter just stood and looked at his corner. To many of the fans' surprise, two of the judges scored the fight in favor of Porter, 116–112 and 115–113, while only one of the judges scored the fight in favor of Ugás, 117–111. The crowd was booing what seemed to many as a controversial split decision win for Porter.

In his next fight, Ugás dominated former world champion Omar Figueroa to a unanimous decision win, winning every round in the process. All three judges scored the fight 119–107 for the Cuban, who only had one point deducted for holding in the fifth round.

In his following fight, Ugás fought Mike Dallas Jr. Ugás boxed well and managed to hurt Dallas Jr on multiple occasions. After the seventh round, Dallas Jr's corner had seen enough and informed the referee he would not be continuing the fight.

=== WBA welterweight champion ===
==== Ugás vs. Ramos ====
On 6 September 2020, Ugás fought Abel Ramos for the vacant WBA (Regular) welterweight title. Ugás outboxed Ramos, dominating most of the rounds throughout the fight. This earned Ugás a split decision victory, with one judge scoring the fight 117–111 for Ramos, while the other two had it narrowly for Ugás, both scoring it 115–113.

==== Ugás vs. Pacquiao ====
On 29 January 2021, Ugás was elevated to the status of WBA (Super) champion after the previous title-holder, eight-division champion Manny Pacquiao, was stripped of his title due to inactivity. The latter had been scheduled to face undefeated WBC and IBF champion Errol Spence Jr. on 21 August 2021 at the T-Mobile Arena in Las Vegas, until Spence had to withdraw due to suffering an injury to his left eye. Subsequently, Ugás took Spence's place, and made the first defense of his WBA (Super) title against Pacquiao.

The bout was a competitive affair, with Ugás using his jab and looping right hand effectively to control the distance. While Pacquiao had moments of success throughout the night, he never truly settled into a rhythm and was noticeably stiffer than usual, not showcasing the deft footwork that he has been known for throughout his career. Pacquiao himself admitted after the fight that his legs were "tight". At the final bell, Ugás was awarded a unanimous decision victory with scores of 116–112, 116–112 and 115–113. According to CompuBox, Pacquiao threw over double the number of punches compared to Ugás, but landed fewer, making the latter the far more accurate boxer on the night. Pacquiao landed 130 punches of 815 thrown (16%), while Ugás landed 151 punches of 405 thrown (37.3%).

==== Ugás vs. Spence Jr. ====
After successfully defending his title against Pacquiao, Ugás petitioned the WBA for a special permit to bypass a mandatory defense against Eimantas Stanionis in order to face the IBF and WBC champion Errol Spence Jr. in a title unification bout. The petition was denied by the WBA on 20 October 2021, who stated: "...we are in special circumstances to resolve extraordinary situations, such as the champion reduction in every division to have only one champion". Accordingly, Ugás and Stanionis were given a 30-day period to negotiate the terms of their bout. As they were unable to come to terms, a purse bid was ordered for 9 December, with a minimal bid of $200,000. The winning bid would be split 75/25 in favor of Ugas as the reigning titlist. On 19 December 2021, WBA President Gilberto J. Mendoza has confirmed that the Spence-Ugas was approved as Stanionis was willing to step aside. The unification bout was officially announced on 8 February 2022. It was scheduled to headline a pay per view card on 16 April, which took place at the AT&T Stadium in Arlington, Texas. The PPV was distributed by Showtime. Ugás lost the fight by a tenth-round technical knockout. The fight was stopped on the advice of the ringside physician, due to Ugas’ severely swollen right eye. He was losing on all three of the judges' scorecards at the time of the stoppage, with scores of 88–82, 88–82 and 88–83. Ugás landed fewer total punches (216 to 96) and fewer power punches (192 to 77) than Spence Jr.

=== Post title reign ===
On 16 March 2023, the WBC ordered Ugas to face the former WBA (Regular) super lightweight champion Mario Barrios for the interim welterweight championship. The title bout took place at the T-Mobile Arena in Las Vegas, Nevada on 30 September 2023. Barrios won the fight by unanimous decision.

== Professional boxing record ==
34 fights	28 wins	6 losses
By knockout	12	1
By decision	16	5

No.	Result	Record	Opponent	Type	Round, time	Date	Location	Notes
34	Win	28-6	Jesus Lopez Perez	SD	8	6 Jun 2026	Arena Sonora, Hermosillo, Sonora, Mexico	
33	Loss	27–6	Mario Barrios	UD	12	30 Sep 2023	T-Mobile Arena, Paradise, Nevada, U.S.	For vacant WBC interim welterweight title
32	Loss	27–5	Errol Spence Jr.	TKO	10 (12), 1:44	16 Apr 2022	AT&T Stadium, Arlington, Texas, U.S.	Lost WBA (Super) welterweight title; For WBC and IBF welterweight titles
31	Win	27–4	Manny Pacquiao	UD	12	21 Aug 2021	T-Mobile Arena, Paradise, Nevada, U.S.	Retained WBA (Super) welterweight title
30	Win	26–4	Abel Ramos	SD	12	6 Sep 2020	Microsoft Theater, Los Angeles, California, U.S.	Won vacant WBA (Regular) welterweight title
29	Win	25–4	Mike Dallas Jr.	RTD	7 (12), 3:00	1 Feb 2020	Beau Rivage Resort, Biloxi, Mississippi, U.S.	
28	Win	24–4	Omar Figueroa Jr.	UD	12	20 Jul 2019	MGM Grand Garden Arena, Paradise, Nevada, U.S.	
27	Loss	23–4	Shawn Porter	SD	12	9 Mar 2019	Dignity Health Sports Park, Carson, California, U.S.	For WBC welterweight title
26	Win	23–3	Cesar Miguel Barrionuevo	UD	12	8 Sep 2018	Barclays Center, New York City, New York, U.S.	
25	Win	22–3	Jonathan Batista	TKO	2 (8), 1:16	16 Jun 2018	The Ford Center at The Star, Frisco, Texas, U.S.	
24	Win	21–3	Ray Robinson	TKO	7 (12), 1:05	17 Feb 2018	Mandalay Bay Events Center, Paradise, Nevada, U.S.	
23	Win	20–3	Thomas Dulorme	UD	10	26 Aug 2017	T-Mobile Arena, Paradise, Nevada, U.S.	
22	Win	19–3	Nelson Lara	TKO	2 (10), 0:53	25 Apr 2017	Fitzgerald's Casino & Hotel, Tunica, Mississippi, U.S.	
21	Win	18–3	Levan Ghvamichava	SD	10	2 Feb 2017	Horseshoe Casino, Tunica, Mississippi, U.S.	
20	Win	17–3	Bryant Perrella	TKO	4 (10), 2:20	27 Sep 2016	Buffalo Thunder Casino, Pojoaque, New Mexico, U.S.	
19	Win	16–3	Jamal James	UD	10	12 Aug 2016	Turning Stone Resort Casino, Verona, New York, U.S.	
18	Loss	15–3	Amir Imam	UD	8	10 May 2014	USC Galen Center, Los Angeles, California, U.S.	
17	Loss	15–2	Emmanuel Robles	SD	10	28 Feb 2014	Crowne Plaza Hotel, San Diego, California, U.S.	For WBC Latino interim super lightweight title
16	Win	15–1	John Williams	UD	10	17 Aug 2013	Revel Resort, Atlantic City, New Jersey, U.S.	
15	Win	14–1	Adan Hernandez	KO	1 (10), 0:40	27 Jun 2013	The Deck, Essington, Pennsylvania, U.S.	
14	Win	13–1	Cosme Rivera	UD	10	7 Dec 2012	Civic Center, Kissimmee, Florida, U.S.	
13	Win	12–1	Dedrick Bell	KO	3 (6), 0:46	10 Nov 2012	River Edge, Reading, Pennsylvania, U.S.	
12	Loss	11–1	Johnny García	SD	8	23 Mar 2012	Casino Del Sol, Tucson, Arizona, U.S.	
11	Win	11–0	Esteban Almaraz	UD	8	13 Jan 2012	Hard Rock Hotel & Casino, Paradise, Nevada, U.S.	
10	Win	10–0	Rynell Griffin	TKO	2 (6)	29 Oct 2011	WinStar Casino, Thackerville, Oklahoma, U.S.	
9	Win	9–0	Fernando Rodriguez	UD	6	13 Aug 2011	Bally's Atlantic City, New Jersey, U.S.	
8	Win	8–0	Kenny Abril	UD	6	25 Jun 2011	South Philly Arena, Philadelphia, U.S.	
7	Win	7–0	Carlos Garcia Hernandez	TKO	6 (6), 1:05	16 Apr 2011	Coliseo Rubén Rodríguez, Bayamón, Puerto Rico	
6	Win	6–0	Carlos Musquez	UD	6	19 Feb 2011	Mandalay Bay Events Center, Paradise, Nevada, U.S.	
5	Win	5–0	Anthony Woods	UD	4	19 Oct 2010	Seminole Hard Rock Hotel and Casino, Hollywood, Florida U.S.	
4	Win	4–0	Anthony Adams	TKO	1 (4), 1:37	24 Sep 2010	Paragon Casino, Marksville, Louisiana, U.S.	
3	Win	3–0	Marqus Jackson	TKO	2 (4), 1:23	18 Aug 2010	Civic Center, Monroe, Louisiana, U.S.	
2	Win	2–0	DeJuan Jackson	KO	1 (4), 1:22	30 Jul 2010	Buffalo Run Casino, Miami, Oklahoma, U.S.	
1	Win	1–0	Dino Dumonjic	UD	4	9 Jul 2010	Club Europe, Atlanta, U.S.	

== Pay-per-view bouts ==
Date	Fight	Billing	Buys	Network	Revenue
21 August 2021	Manny Pacquiao vs. Yordenis Ugás	Manny Pacquiao vs. Yordenis Ugás	250,000	Fox	$18,750,000
16 April 2022	Errol Spence Jr. vs. Yordenis Ugás	Spence Jr. vs. Ugás	240,000	Showtime	$18,000,000
		Total Sales	490,000		$36,750,000

Sporting positions
World boxing titles
Vacant Title last held by Manny Pacquiao	WBA welterweight champion Regular title 6 September 2020 – 29 January 2021; Promoted	Vacant Title next held by Jamal James
Preceded by Manny Pacquiao; Status changed	WBA welterweight champion Super title 29 January 2021 – 16 April 2022	Succeeded by Errol Spence Jr.
