= Eimantas Stanionis =

Lithuanian boxer (born 1994)

Personal information
- Nickname: Jaunutis
- Born: August 17, 1994 (age 32) Kaunas, Lithuania
- Height: 5 ft 8 in (173 cm)
- Weight: Welterweight; Light-middleweight

Boxing career
- Reach: 68 in (173 cm)
- Stance: Orthodox

Boxing record
- Total fights: 19
- Wins: 17
- Win by KO: 10
- Losses: 1
- No contests: 1
Medal record
Men's amateur boxing
Representing Lithuania
European Championships
Gold medal – first place	2015 Samokov	Welterweight
European Junior Championships
Bronze medal – third place	2010 Lviv	–52kg

Eimantas Stanionis (born 17 August 1994) is a Lithuanian professional boxer. He held the World Boxing Association (WBA) welterweight title from 2022 to 2025.

As an amateur, he won a gold medal at the 2015 European Championships in the welterweight bracket.

== Professional career ==
After defeating Liu Wei in his first match in the welterweight division of the 2016 Summer Olympics he lost a 3-0 decision to eventual silver medalist, and 2017 World amateur champion, Shakhram Giyasov of Uzbekistan.

Stanionis made his professional debut on April 9, 2017, against Rasheed Olawale Lawal. He won the fight by a first-round knockout. Stanionis notched three more victories in 2017, stopping Isaac Freeman on July 30, Oscar Valenzuela on September 23, and winning a unanimous decision against Todd Manuel on October 14.

Stanionis began 2018 with a fourth-round technical knockout of Hector Munoz on March 10, 2018. He followed this up with a third-round technical knockout of Erick Daniel Martinez on June 16, and by winning a unanimous decision against Levan Ghvamichava on August 24.

Stanionis fought three times in 2019. He first won a unanimous decision against Samuel Figueroa on March 9, 2019, which was followed by stoppage victories over Evincii Dixon on October 26, and Julio Cesar Sanchez on December 21.

Stanionis was scheduled to face Justin DeLoach on November 4, 2020. He won the fight by a ninth-round knockout, which was preceded by two knockdowns in the same round. Stanionis was next scheduled to fight Janer Gonzalez just one month later, on December 16, 2020. He won the fight by a ninth-round knockout, with two of the three judges also awarding him all eight preceding rounds.

Stanionis was scheduled to face the one-time WBO light-welterweight title challenger Thomas Dulorme on April 10, 2021, in his first 12-round bout. He won the fight by unanimous decision, with scores of 117-111, 116-112 and 115-113. Stanionis faced the former WBA welterweight titlist Luis Collazo on August 7, 2021. The fight ended in a no-contest, following an accidental clash of heads which caused a cut in Collazo’s right eyelid.

He challenged WBA (Regular) welterweight champion Radzhab Butaev at AT&T Stadium in Arlington, Texas, USA, on April 16, 2022. Stanionis won via split decision with two of the ringside judges scoring the fight 116–111 and 117–110 in his favour, overruling the third who had the fight 114–113 for his opponent.

On May 4, 2024 at the T-Mobile Arena, Paradise, Nevada, USA, Stanionis defended his title against Gabriel Maestre, winning by unanimous decision.

=== WBA & IBF Welterweight Championship Unification ===
==== Stanionis vs. Ennis ====
Having been elevated to full WBA welterweight champion when Terence Crawford vacated the title in August 2024, Stanionis was scheduled to face IBF welterweight champion Jaron Ennis in a title unification bout at Jim Whelan Boardwalk Hall in Atlantic City, New Jersey, USA, on April 12, 2025. He was knocked to the canvas in the sixth round and lost when his corner retired him before the start of the seventh.

=== Post-title career ===
Stanionis returned to the competitive boxing ring for the first time since losing his title on September 27, 2025, taking on Jabulani Makhense at Zalgiris Arena in Kaunas, Lithuania. He won the 10-round contest via unanimous decision.

In his next fight, Stanionis knocked out Kaine Fourie in the second round at Zalgiris Arena in Kaunas, Lithuania, on September 26, 2026.

== Professional boxing record ==
19 fights	17 wins	1 loss
By knockout	10	1
By decision	7	0
No contests	1	

No.	Result	Record	Opponent	Type	Round, time	Date	Location	Notes
19	Win	17–1 (1)	Kaine Fourie	KO	2 (10), 1:11	26 Sep 2026	Zalgiris Arena, Kaunas, Lithuania	
18	Win	16–1 (1)	Jabulani Makhense	UD	10	27 Sep 2025	Zalgiris Arena, Kaunas, Lithuania	
17	Loss	15–1 (1)	Jaron Ennis	RTD	6 (12), 3:00	12 Apr 2025	Boardwalk Hall, Atlantic City, New Jersey, U.S.	Lost WBA welterweight title; For IBF and vacant The Ring welterweight titles
16	Win	15–0 (1)	Gabriel Maestre	UD	12	4 May 2024	T-Mobile Arena, Paradise, Nevada, US	Retained WBA (Regular) welterweight title
15	Win	14–0 (1)	Radzhab Butaev	SD	12	16 Apr 2022	AT&T Stadium, Arlington, Texas, US	Won WBA (Regular) welterweight title
14	NC	13–0 (1)	Luis Collazo	NC	4 (10), 2:44	7 Aug 2021	Minneapolis Armory, Minneapolis, Minnesota, US	Collazo suffered a cut from an accidental head clash
13	Win	13–0	Thomas Dulorme	UD	12	10 Apr 2021	Mohegan Sun Arena, Montville, Connecticut, US	
12	Win	12–0	Janer Gonzalez	KO	9 (10), 0:45	16 Dec 2020	Shrine Exposition Hall, Los Angeles, California, US	
11	Win	11–0	Justin DeLoach	KO	9 (10), 2:53	4 Nov 2020	Microsoft Theater, Los Angeles, California, US	
10	Win	10–0	Julio Cesar Sanchez	KO	3 (10), 2:05	21 Dec 2019	Toyota Arena, Ontario, California, US	
9	Win	9–0	Evincii Dixon	KO	1 (6), 2:11	26 Oct 2019	Santander Arena, Reading, Pennsylvania, US	
8	Win	8–0	Samuel Figueroa	UD	8	9 Mar 2019	Dignity Health Sports Park, Carson, California, US	
7	Win	7–0	Levan Ghvamichava	UD	8	24 Aug 2018	Minneapolis Armory, Minneapolis, Minnesota, US	
6	Win	6–0	Erick Daniel Martinez	TKO	3 (8), 1:56	16 Jun 2018	Ford Center at The Star, Frisco, Texas, US	
5	Win	5–0	Hector Munoz	TKO	4 (8), 1:50	10 Mar 2018	Freeman Coliseum, San Antonio, Texas, US	
4	Win	4–0	Todd Manuel	UD	8	14 Oct 2017	StubHub Center, Carson, California, US	
3	Win	3–0	Oscar Valenzuela	KO	1 (6), 1:44	23 Sep 2017	Alamodome, San Antonio, Texas, US	
2	Win	2–0	Isaac Freeman	KO	3 (6), 0:50	30 Jul 2017	Rabobank Theater, Bakersfield, California, US	
1	Win	1–0	Rasheed Lawal	KO	1 (4), 2:35	9 Apr 2017	The Novo, Los Angeles, California, US	

== See also ==
- List of world welterweight boxing champions

Sporting positions
World boxing titles
Preceded by Radzhab Butaev	WBA welterweight champion Regular title April 16, 2022 – August 30, 2024; Promoted	Vacant Title next held by Rolando Romero
Preceded by Terence Crawford as Super Champion	WBA welterweight champion August 30, 2024 – April 12, 2025	Succeeded by Jaron Ennis
