= Turkey at the 2005 Mediterranean Games =

- IOC code: TUR
- NOC: Turkish Olympic Committee

in Almería
- Competitors: 296
- Medals Ranked 4th: Gold 20 Silver 24 Bronze 29 Total 73

Mediterranean Games appearances (overview)
- 1951; 1955; 1959; 1963; 1967; 1971; 1975; 1979; 1983; 1987; 1991; 1993; 1997; 2001; 2005; 2009; 2013; 2018; 2022

Turkey (listed as TUR) participated in the 2005 Mediterranean Games in Almería, Spain. With 100 female and 196 male athletes participating, Turkey garnered 73 medals, marking its most successful participation in an international multi-sport gaming event.

Medal	Name	Sport	Event
Gold	Eşref Apak	Athletics	Men's Hammer Throw
Gold	Turkey	Basketball	Women's Team
Gold	Atagün Yalçınkaya	Boxing	Men's 51 kg
Gold	Bülent Ulusoy	Boxing	Men's 69 kg
Gold	Selim Tataroğlu	Judo	Men's + 100 kg
Gold	Belkıs Zehra Kaya	Judo	Women's + 78 kg
Gold	Yıldız Aras	Karate	Women's Open
Gold	Turkey	Volleyball	Women's Team
Gold	Gülbeyi Aktı	Weightlifting	Men's 56 kg - Snatch
Gold	Sedat Artuç	Weightlifting	Men's 62 kg - Clean and Jerk
Gold	Ekrem Celil	Weightlifting	Men's 69 kg - Clean and Jerk
Gold	Bünyamin Sudaş	Weightlifting	Men's 105 kg - Clean and Jerk
Gold	Nurcan Taylan	Weightlifting	Women's 53 kg - Snatch
Gold	Nurcan Taylan	Weightlifting	Women's 53 kg - Clean and Jerk
Gold	Emine Bilgin	Weightlifting	Women's 58 kg - Snatch
Gold	Selçuk Çebi	Wrestling	Men's Grecoroman 66 kg
Gold	Mahmut Altay	Wrestling	Men's Grecoroman 74 kg
Gold	Serhat Balcı	Wrestling	Men's Freestyle 84 kg
Gold	Hakan Koç	Wrestling	Men's Freestyle 96 kg
Gold	Aydın Polatçı	Wrestling	Men's Freestyle 120 kg
Silver	Turkey	Archery	Women's team
Silver	Selçuk Aydın	Boxing	Lightweight (60 kg)
Silver	Savaş Kaya	Boxing	Middleweight (75 kg)
Silver	İhsan Yıldırım Tarhan	Boxing	Light heavyweight (81 kg)
Silver	Turkey	Football	Men's team
Silver	Turkey	Golf	Men's team
Silver	Aynur Samat	Judo	Women's 48–52 kg
Silver	Turkey	Football	Men's team
Silver	Yıldız Aras	Karate	Women's +65 kg
Silver	Saim Kaya, Saim Kaya	Rowing	Men's double sculls
Silver	Mete Yeltepe	Rowing	Men's lightweight single sculls
Silver	Yusuf Dikeç	Shooting	Men 10 m Air pistol
Silver	Gülbeyi Aktı	Weightlifting	Men's 56 kg - Clean and Jerk
Silver	Sedat Artuç	Weightlifting	Men's 62 kg - Snatch
Silver	Yasin Arslan	Weightlifting	Men's 69 kg - Snatch
Silver	Reyhan Arabacıoğlu	Weightlifting	Men's 77 kg - Clean and Jerk
Silver	Mehmet Yılmaz	Weightlifting	Men's 77 kg - Snatch
Silver	Bünyamin Sudaş	Weightlifting	Men's 105 kg - Snatch
Silver	Sibel Özkan	Weightlifting	Women's 48 kg - Clean and Jerk
Silver	Serkan Özden	Wrestling	Men's Greco-Roman 84 kg
Silver	Yekta Yılmaz Gül	Wrestling	Men's Greco-Roman 120 kg
Silver	Tevfik Odabaşı	Wrestling	Men's freestyle 60 kg
Silver	Zeynep Yıldırım	Wrestling	Women's 51 kg
Silver	Fahrettin Özata	Wrestling	Men's freestyle 74 kg
Bronze	Derya Bard Sarıaltın	Archery	Women's individual
Bronze	Ercüment Olgundeniz	Athletics	Men's discus throw
Bronze	Turkey	Athletics	Women's 4 × 400 m Relay
Bronze	Binnaz Uslu	Athletics	800 m
Bronze	Anzhela Atroshchenko	Athletics	Heptathlon
Bronze	Abdülkadir Koçak	Boxing	Light flyweight (48 kg)
Bronze	Serdar Avcı	Boxing	Bantamweight (54 kg)
Bronze	Yakup Kılıç	Boxing	Featherweight (57 kg)
Bronze	Önder Şipal	Boxing	Super lightweight (64 kg)
Bronze	Hamza Hakan Sayın	Golf	Men's Individual
Bronze	Bektaş Demirel	Judo	Men's 60–66 kg
Bronze	Burhan Koçan	Judo	Men's 81–90 kg
Bronze	Neşe Şensoy Yıldız	Judo	Women's -48 kg
Bronze	Seda Karadağ	Judo	Women's 73–78 kg
Bronze	Şevket Baştürk	Karate	Men's -60 kg
Bronze	Zeynel Çelik	Karate	Men's 75–80 kg
Bronze	Yusuf Başer	Karate	Men's Open
Bronze	Vildan Doğan	Karate	Women's -50 kg
Bronze	Gülcihan Ustaoğlu	Karate	Women's 60–65 kg
Bronze	İhsan Emre Vural, Ahmet Yumrukaya	Rowing	Men's Lightweight coxless pair
Bronze	Halil İbrahim Öztürk	Shooting	Men 10 m Air rifle
Bronze	Ekrem Celil	Weightlifting	Men's 69 kg - Snatch
Bronze	Mehmet Yılmaz	Weightlifting	Men's 77 kg - Clean and Jerk
Bronze	Emine Bilgin	Weightlifting	Women's 58 kg - Clean and Jerk
Bronze	Erkan Dündar	Wrestling	Men's Greco-Roman 55 kg
Bronze	Uğur Tüfenk	Wrestling	Men's Greco-Roman 60 kg
Bronze	Mehmet Özal	Wrestling	Men's Greco-Roman 96 kg
Bronze	Ramazan Demir	Wrestling	Men's freestyle 55 kg
Bronze	Levent Kaleli	Wrestling	Men's freestyle 66 kg

== Results by event ==
=== Archery ===
Men's individual

- Mehmet Darılmaz - 14th place
- Doğan Gürsel - 7th place
- Okyay Tunc Küçükkayalar - 11th place

Women's individual

- Derya Bard Sarıaltın Bronze medal
- Damla Günay - 14th place
- Zekiye Keskin Şatır - 11th place

Women's team

- Derya Bard Sarıaltın, Damla Günay, Zekiye Keskin Şatır – defeated Italy by 236-232 - Silver medal

=== Artistic gymnastics ===
- Göksu Üçtaş
- Ebru Karaduman

=== Athletics ===
Men's

- İsmail Aslan 100 m, 200 m
- Tuncay Örs 400 m Hurdles – 52.55' – 8th place
- Selahattin Çobanoğlu 800 m
- Ramazan Çuğlan 1500 m
- Halil Akkaş 3000 m Steeplechase
- Abdülkadir Türk Half marathon – 1:08:10.00 - 9th place
- Ercüment Olgundeniz Discus throw 59.16 m - Bronze medal
- Eşref Apak Hammer throw – 77.88 m - Gold medal
- Ferhat Çiçek Long jump – 7.50 m – 11th place
- Ferhat Çiçek Triple jump – 16.03 m – 11th place
- Fatih Yazıcı Shot put

Men's handicap

- Ömer Cantay 1500 m wheelchair 3:30.94 – 6th place

Women's

- Saliha Memiş 100 m - 12.09' 13th place at the semifinals
- Esen Kızıldağ 100 m Hurdles 13.97' – 7th place
- Birsen Bekgöz 200 m - 24.33' 9h place at the semifinals, 400 m Hurdles - 50.03' 14th place at the semifinals
- Pınar Saka 400 m – 54.75 – 7th place
- Özge Gürler 400 m Hurdles - 58.24' 11th place at the semifinals
- Anzhela Atroshchenko, Birsen Bekgöz, Özge Gürler, Saliha Memiş, Pınar Saka 4 × 100 m Relay – 45.93' – 6th place
- Anzhela Atroshchenko, Birsen Bekgöz, Özge Gürler, Saliha Memiş, Pınar Saka, Binnaz Uslu 4 × 400 m Relay – 3:40.75' - Bronze medal
- Binnaz Uslu 800 m – 2:02.68' - Bronze medal
- Türkan Bozkurt Erişmiş Half marathon – 1:17:56.00 - 5th place
- Yeliz Ay 20 km Walk - not finished
- Candeğer Kılınçer Oğuz High jump – 1.82 m – 5th place
- Filiz Kadoğan Shot put 16.45 m - 5th place
- Anzhela Atroshchenko Heptathlon (100 m Hurdles: 14.15' – 4th place -, 200 m: 25.26' 4th ace, 800 m: 2:16.61' – 4th place, High jump: 1.70 m – 5th place, Javelin throw: 40.73 m – 4th place, Long jump: 6.17 m – 3rd place, Shot put: 13.22 m – 3rd place) - 5,870p - Bronze medal

=== Basketball ===
Men

- Ender Arslan, Fırat Aydemir, Volkan Çetintahra, Hüseyin Demiral, Ermal Kurtoğlu, Reha Öz, Barış Özcan, Cevher Özer, Valentin Pastal, Kaya Peker, Kerem Tunçeri, Erkan Veyseloğlu - 4th place

Women

- Gülşah Akkaya, Korel Engin, Yasemin Horasan, Şaziye İvegin, Arzu Özyiğit, Esmeral Tunçluer, Birsel Vardarlı, Nilay Yiğit, Aylin Yıldızoğlu, Nevriye Yılmaz, Serap Yücesır, Müjde Yüksel Gold medal

=== Beach volleyball ===
Men

- Semih Çıtak, Mehmet Akif Gürgen, Bülent Kandemir, Erkan Togan

Women

- Ebru Bayram, Nejla Güçlü, Zülfiye Gündoğdu, Müjgan Keskin

=== Boxing ===
- Abdülkadir Koçak Light flyweight (48 kg) Bronze medal
- Atagün Yalçınkaya Flyweight (51 kg) Gold medal
- Serdar Avcı Bantamweight (54 kg) Bronze medal
- Yakup Kılıç Featherweight (57 kg) Bronze medal
- Selçuk Aydın Lightweight (60 kg) Silver medal
- Önder Şipal Super lightweight (64 kg) Bronze medal
- Bülent Ulusoy Welterweight (69 kg) Gold medal
- Savaş Kaya Middleweight (75 kg) Silver medal
- İhsan Yıldırım Tarhan Light heavyweight (81 kg) Silver medal
- Kurban Günebakan Super heavyweight (+91 kg)

=== Canoe, flat ===
Men's

- Akın Ağzer Çiçek K1 500 m
- Fırat Akça K1 1000 m
- Gökhan Bahadır, Tolga Turan K2 500 m
- Abdurrahman Demir, Murat Zeki Güçlü K2 1000 m

Women's

- İclal Maviş K1 500 m
- Gamze Togay K1 500 m K1 1000 m

=== Cycling, road ===
Individual time trial

- Kemal Küçükbay – 13th place
- Mehmet Mutlu – 15th place

Road race

- M. Mustafa Karaselek
- Kemal Küçükbay
- Mustafa Maral
- Mehmet Mutlu
- Orhan Şahin
- Behçet Usta

=== Equestrian ===
Individual jumping

- Sencer Can
- İhsan Sencer Horasan
- Hulki Karagülle
- İskender Pisak
- Ata Zorlu

Team jumping

- Sencer Can, Sencer Horasan, Hulki Karagülle, Ata Zorlu

=== Fencing ===
Men's individual épée

- Ulaş Barış Badoğlu

Men's individual foil

- Adnan Özsanat
- Utku Uluşahin

Men's individual sabre

- Erdoğan Kızıldağ
- Kerem Seyfi Yıldırım

Women's individual épée

- Emel Işık

Women's individual foil

- Ilgın Güçlüer
- Tuğba Nilay Güngör

=== Football ===
Men

- Volkan Babacan, Can Arat, Cafercan Aksu, Ertan Aktepe, Serhat Akyüz, Serkan Atak, Bulut Basmaz, İbrahim Dağaşan, Emre Hamzaoğlu, Bekir Irtegun, Ramazan Kahya, Doğa Kaya, Serdar Kurtuluş, Muhammet Reis, Soner Sakarya, Feridun Sungur, Arda Turan, Sezgin Yılmaz – lost to Spain by 0-1 - Silver medal

=== Golf ===
Men's Individual

- Mustafa Hocaoğlu – 295p- 5th place
- Gencer Özcan – 299p- 6th place
- Hamza Hakan Sayın – 294p - Bronze medal

Team

- Mustafa Hocaoğlu, Gencer Özcan, Hamza Hakan Sayın – 583p - Silver medal

Women's Individual

- Nejla Gerçek – 316p – 9th place
- Zakire Korkmaz – 336p – 17th place
- Elçin Ulu – 331p – 15th place

Team

- Nejla Gerçek, Zakire Korkmaz, Elçin Ulu – 641p – 4th place

=== Handball ===
Men

- Şevket Altuğ, Şenol Boyar, Oğuzhan Büyük, İbrahim Demir, Ramazan Döne, Bülent Erkol, Cavit Eyövge, Okan Halay, Enis Kahya, Volga Karslıoğlu, Ümit Kırkayak, Taner Öymen, Hüseyin Pamuk, Ömer Savaş, Okan Yalçıner, Yasin Yüzbaşıoğlu

Women

- Sevda Akbulut, Güneş Atabay, Duygu Aydoğan, Asiye Çelik, Sevilay İmamoğlu, Serpil İskenderoğlu, Eda Maden, Seda Maden, Gonca Nahçıvanlı, Melda Deniz Olcay, Yeliz Özel, Esra Sarı, Serpil Soylu, Nergis Türkay, Ceren Üstün, Yeliz Yılmaz – 5th place

=== Judo ===
Men's

- Halil İbrahim Uzun -60 kg – 4th place
- Bektaş Demirel 60–66 kg Bronze medal
- Sezer Huysuz 66–73 kg Silver medal
- İrakli Uznadze 73–81 kg
- Burhan Koçan 81–90 kg Bronze medal
- Murat Gemalmaz 90–100 kg
- Selim Tataroğlu +100 kg Gold medal

Women's

- Neşe Şensoy Yıldız -48 kg Bronze medal
- Aynur Samat 48–52 kg Silver medal
- Özge Nur Akyüz 52–57 kg
- Canan Kastan 57–63 kg
- Ebru Aktan 63–70 kg
- Seda Karadağ 73–78 kg Bronze medal
- Belkıs Zehra Kaya +78 kg Gold medal

=== Karate ===
Men's

- Şevket Baştürk -60 kg Bronze medal
- Bahattin Kandaz 60–65 kg
- Haldun Alagas 65–70 kg
- İsmail Hakkı Şen 70–75 kg
- Zeynel Çelik 75–80 kg Bronze medal
- Okay Arpa +80 kg
- Yusuf Başer Open Bronze medal

Women's

- Vildan Doğan -50 kg Bronze medal
- Gülderen Çelik 50–55 kg
- Esra Sertdemir 55–60 kg
- Gülcihan Ustaoğlu 60–65 kg Bronze medal
- Yıldız Aras +65 kg Silver medal
- Yıldız Aras Open Gold medal

=== Rhythmic gymnastics ===
All-Around

- Gizem Oylumlu – 48.275p – 10th place
- Berfin Serdil Sütcü – 49.425p – 9th place

=== Rowing ===
Men's

- Hasan Özcan Single sculls
- Saim Kaya, Saim Kaya Double sculls Silver medal
- İhsan Emre Vural, Ahmet Yumrukaya Lightweight coxless pair Bronze medal
- Mete Yeltepe Lightweight single sculls Silver medal
- Atakan Çolak, Murat Türker Lightweight double sculls

=== Sailing ===
Men's Single-handed Dinghy-Laser

- Kemal Muslubaş – 96p – 11th place
- Güray Zümbül – 125p – 13th place

Double-handed Dinghy-470

- Okan Akdağ, Levent Peynirci – 118p – 12th place
- Efe Karakaplan, Hakan Karakaplan – 135p – 13th place

Windsurfer - Mistral

- Koray Ezer – 77p - 7th place

Women's

- Ayda Ünver Single-handed Dinghy-Laser – 88p – 9th place

=== Shooting ===
Men

- Yusuf Dikeç 10 m Air pistol – 681p - Silver medal
- Aydın Güçlü 10 m Air pistol
- Halil İbrahim Öztürk 10 m Air rifle – 694.7p (Turkey record) Bronze medal
- Halil İbrahim Öztürk 50 m Rifle 3 positions
- Abdurrahman Akgün 50 m rifle prone - 7th place
- Murat Şahin 50 m Rifle prone
- Yusuf Karamuk Skeet
- Güçhan Olker Skeet
- Oğuzhan Tüzün Trap – 4th place

Women

- Saliha Kurteş 10 m Air rifle
- Nihan Gürer Trap

=== Swimming ===
Men's

- Emre Çelik 100 m Backstroke, 200 m Backstroke
- Ömer Aslanoğlu 50 m Breaststroke, 100 m Breaststroke
- Engin Can Eter 50 m Breaststroke, 100 m Breaststroke, 200 m Breaststroke
- Mert Karşıyakalılar 50 m Butterfly, 100 m Butterfly
- Onur Uras 50 m Butterfly, 100 m Butterfly, 200 m Butterfly
- Eren Onurlu 50 m Butterfly, 100 m Freestyle
- Aytekin Mindan 200 m Freestyle

Men's Handicap S/10

- İsmet Ayık 100 m Freestyle
- Mustafa Yılmaz 100 m Freestyle

Women's

- Gizem Papila 50 m Freestyle
- Derya Erke 100 m Backstroke – 1:04.84' - 8th place
- Gülşah Gönenç 200 m Butterfly 2:15.57' Turkey record
- Özlem Yasemin Taşkın 800 m Freestyle

=== Table tennis ===
Men's

- Halil Hacı Single, Double
- İrfan Tavukçuoğlu Single, Double

Women's

- Azize Baş Single, Double
- Ayşe Şen Single, Double

=== Tennis ===
Men's

- Haluk Akkoyun Single, Double
- Ergun Zorlu Double
- Ümit Barış Ergüden Single

Women's

- Çağla Büyükakçay Single
- Pemra Özgen Single
- Çağla Büyükakçay, Pemra Özgen Double lost to Italy by 0-2 - 4th place

=== Volleyball ===
Men

- Hakan Akışık, Osman Babagiray, Orhan Cinoğlu, Arslan Ekşi, Barış Hamaz, Özkan Hayırlı, İzzet C. Kartaltepe, Ulaş Kıyak, İsmail Cem Kurtar, Ömer Laçin, Soner Mezgitçi – lost to Greece by 2-3 - 8th place

Women

- Elif Ağca, Neslihan Demir, Deniz Hakyemez, Natalia Hanikoğlu, Gülden Kayalar, Eda Erdem, Gözde Kırdar, Aysun Özbek, Özlem Özçelik, Fatma D. Sipahioğlu, Seda Tokatlıoğlu, Bahar Mert – won Greece by 3-0 - Gold medal

=== Water polo ===
Men

- Halil Beşkardeşler, Hakan Çalışır, Emre Coşkun, Orkun Darnel, Can Güven, Yiğithan Hantal, Sezai Kayhan Kızıltan, Oytun Okman, Atilla Sezer, Cahit Sılay, Anıl Sönmez, Michael Taylan, Aytaç Yeğin – 8th place

=== Weightlifting ===
Men's

- Gülbeyi Aktı 56 kg Snatch: 113 kg Gold medal, Clean and jerk: 141 kg Silver medal
- Sedat Artuç 62 kg Snatch: 126 kg Silver medal, Clean and jerk: 160 kg Gold medal
- Yasin Arslan 69 kg Snatch:Silver medal
- Ekrem Celil 69 kg Snatch:Bronze medal, Clean and jerk Gold medal
- Reyhan Arabacıoğlu 77 kg Clean and jerk: Silver medal
- Mehmet Yılmaz 77 kg Snatch:Silver medal, Clean and jerk Bronze medal
- İzzet İnce 85 kg
- Bünyamin Sudaş 105 kg : Snatch: 178 kg Silver medal, Clean and jerk: 226 kg (MR) Gold medal

Women's

- Sibel Özkan 48 kg Snatch: 70 kg 4th place, Clean and jerk: 90 kg Silver medal
- Emine Karademir 53 kg Snatch: 77 kg – 6th place, Clean and jerk: 90 kg – 7th place
- Nurcan Taylan 53 kg Snatch: 87 kg (MR), Gold medal, Clean and jerk: 108 kg (MR), Gold medal
- Emine Bilgin 58 kg Snatch: 91 kg - Gold medal, Clean and jerk: 110 kg Bronze medal

=== Wrestling ===
Men's Greco-Roman style:

- Erkan Dündar 55 kg Bronze medal
- Uğur Tüfenk 60 kg Bronze medal
- Selçuk Çebi 66 kg Gold medal
- Mahmut Altay 74 kg Gold medal
- Serkan Özden 84 kg Silver medal
- Mehmet Özal 96 kg Bronze medal
- Yekta Yılmaz Gül 120 kg Silver medal

Men's freestyle

- Ramazan Demir 55 kg Bronze medal
- Tevfik Odabaşı 60 kg Silver medal
- Levent Kaleli 66 kg Bronze medal
- Fahrettin Özata 74 kg Silver medal
- Serhat Balcı 84 kg Gold medal
- Hakan Koç 96 kg Gold medal
- Aydın Polatçı 120 kg Gold medal

Women's

- Zeynep Yıldırım 51 kg Silver medal
- Nadir Uğrun Perçin 59 kg

== See also ==
- Turkey at the 2004 Summer Olympics
- Turkey at the 2008 Summer Olympics
