= Boxing at the 2004 Summer Olympics – Heavyweight =

Boxing competitions

Heavyweight boxing at the Games of the XXVIII Olympiad
- Venue: Peristeri Olympic Boxing Hall
- Date: 18–28 August 2004
- Competitors: 16 from 16 nations

Medalists
| 1st place, gold medalist(s) | | Odlanier Solis | Cuba |
| 2nd place, silver medalist(s) | | Viktar Zuyev | Belarus |
| 3rd place, bronze medalist(s) | | Mohamed Elsayed | Egypt |
| 3rd place, bronze medalist(s) | | Naser Al Shami | Syria |

The heavyweight boxing competition at the 2004 Summer Olympics in Athens was held from 18 to 28 August at Peristeri Olympic Boxing Hall. This is limited to those boxers weighing between 81 and 91 kilograms.

== Competition format ==
Like all Olympic boxing events, the competition was a straight single-elimination tournament. This event consisted of 28 boxers who have qualified for the competition through various tournaments held in 2003 and 2004. The competition began with a preliminary round on 18 August, where the number of competitors was reduced to eight, and concluded with the final on 28 August.

All bouts consisted of four rounds of two minutes each, with one-minute breaks between rounds. Punches scored only if the white area on the front of the glove made full contact with the front of the head or torso of the opponent. Five judges scored each bout; three of the judges had to signal a scoring punch within one second for the punch to score. The winner of the bout was the boxer who scored the most valid punches by the end of the bout.

== Schedule ==
All times are Greece Standard Time (UTC+2)

| Date | Time | Round |
|---|---|---|
| Wednesday, 18 August 2004 | 13:30 | Round of 16 |
| Sunday, 22 August 2004 | 19:30 | Quarterfinals |
| Friday, 27 August 2004 | 13:30 | Semifinals |
| Saturday, 28 August 2004 | 19:30 | Final |

== Qualifying Athletes ==
| Athlete | Country |
|---|---|
| Odlanier Solís | Cuba |
| Aleksandr Alekseyev | Russia |
| Ertuğrul Ergezen | Turkey |
| Wilmer Vasquez | Venezuela |
| Emmanuel Izonritei | Nigeria |
| Naser Al Shami | Syria |
| Vugar Alakbarov | Azerbaijan |
| Spyridon Kladouchas | Greece |
| Rachid El Haddak | Morocco |
| Devin Vargas | United States |
| Viktar Zuyev | Belarus |
| Daniel Betti | Italy |
| Mohamed Elsayed | Egypt |
| Igor Alborov | Uzbekistan |
| Vedran Đipalo | Croatia |
| Adam Forsyth | Australia |

== Results ==
Round of 16
Odlanier Solís (CUB) | 24
Aleksandr Alekseyev (RUS) | 21
Ertuğrul Ergezen (TUR) | DSQ
Wilmer Vasquez (VEN) | WO
Emmanuel Izonritei (NGR) | 17
Naser Al Shami (SYR) | 30
Vugar Alakbarov (AZE) | 18
Spyridon Kladouchas (GRE) | 14
Rachid El-Haddak (MAR)
Devin Vargas (USA) | RSC
Viktar Zuyev (BLR) | RSC
Daniel Betti (ITA)
Mohamed Elsayed (EGY) | 18+
Igor Alborov (UZB) | 18
Vedran Đipalo (CRO) | 22
Adam Forsyth (AUS) | 32

Quarterfinals
Odlanier Solís (CUB) | 24
Wilmer Vasquez (VEN) | 4
Naser Al Shami (SYR) | RSC
Vugar Alakbarov (AZE) | DSQ
Devin Vargas (USA) | 27
Viktar Zuyev (BLR) | 36
Mohamed Elsayed (EGY) | 27
Adam Forsyth (AUS) | 12

Semifinals
Odlanier Solís (CUB) | RSC
Naser Al Shami (SYR)
Viktar Zuyev (BLR) | WO
Mohamed Elsayed (EGY)

Finals
Odlanier Solís (CUB) | 22
Viktar Zuyev (BLR) | 13
