= Victor Vykhryst =

Ukrainian boxer (born 1992)

Viktor Vykhryst
Personal information
- Native name: Віктор Вихрист
- Born: 3 June 1992 (age 34) Svitlovodsk, Ukraine
- Height: 6 ft 5 in (196 cm)
- Weight: Heavyweight

Boxing career
- Stance: Orthodox

Boxing record
- Total fights: 19
- Wins: 18
- Win by KO: 11
- Losses: 1
Medal record
Men's amateur boxing
Representing Ukraine
European Games
| Gold medal – first place | 2019 Minsk | Super-heavyweight |
European Championships
| Gold medal – first place | 2017 Kharkiv | Super-heavyweight |

Viktor Viktorovych Vykhryst (Ukrainian: Віктор Вікторович Вихрист; born 3 June 1992), also known as Viktor Faust, is a Ukrainian professional boxer. As an amateur, he won gold medals at the 2017 European Championships and the 2019 European Games.

== Professional boxing record ==
| 19 fights | 18 wins | 1 loss |
|---|---|---|
| By knockout | 11 | 1 |
| By decision | 7 | 0 |

| No. | Result | Record | Opponent | Type | Round, time | Date | Location | Notes |
|---|---|---|---|---|---|---|---|---|
| 19 | Win | 18–1 | Mariusz Wach | UD | 10 | 25 Mar 2026 | Koltai Jeno Sports Hall, Budapest, Hungary | Retained WBO European heavyweight title |
| 18 | Win | 17–1 | Todorche Cvetkov | KO | 1 (10), 0:18 | 17 Jan 2026 | GP Joule Arena, Flensburg, Germany | Won vacant WBO European heavyweight title |
| 17 | Win | 16–1 | Bojan Cestic | RTD | 1 (6), 3:00 | 10 Oct 2025 | Brasov, Romania | |
| 16 | Win | 15–1 | Christopher Lovejoy | KO | 1 (6), 0:35 | 7 Jun 2025 | Kiel, Germany | |
| 15 | Win | 14–1 | Rydell Booker | UD | 8 | 5 Apr 2025 | MBS Arena, Potsdam, Germany | |
| 14 | Win | 13–1 | Mirko Tintor | UD | 6 | 21 Sep 2024 | Sporthalle, Hamburg, Germany | |
| 13 | Win | 12–1 | Marcos Antonio Aumada | TKO | 4 (8), 1:23 | 25 Feb 2024 | Black Wolves Fight Club, Wiesbaden, Germany | |
| 12 | Loss | 11–1 | Lenier Pero | TKO | 8 (10), 2:28 | 11 Feb 2023 | Alamodome, San Antonio, Texas, US | |
| 11 | Win | 11–0 | Franklin Lawrence | UD | 8 | 17 Dec 2022 | Firat Arslan Sportcenter, Göppingen, Germany | |
| 10 | Win | 10–0 | Kevin Johnson | PTS | 8 | 27 Aug 2022 | ECB Boxgym, Hamburg, Germany | |
| 9 | Win | 9–0 | Iago Kiladze | TKO | 2 (8), 1:44 | 1 Jan 2022 | Seminole Hard Rock Hotel And Casino, Hollywood, Florida, US | |
| 8 | Win | 8–0 | Mike Marshall | TKO | 3 (8), 1:49 | 9 Oct 2021 | T-Mobile Arena, Paradise, Nevada, US | |
| 7 | Win | 7–0 | Jacek Krzysztof Piatek | KO | 1 (10), 2:20 | 15 May 2021 | Box Gym, Cologne, Germany | |
| 6 | Win | 6–0 | Wilmer Vasquez | UD | 8 | 13 Mar 2021 | ECB Boxgym, Hamburg, Germany | |
| 5 | Win | 5–0 | Kamil Sokolowski | UD | 6 | 27 Nov 2020 | H Arena, Nantes, France | |
| 4 | Win | 4–0 | Yakup Saglam | RTD | 4 (8), 3:00 | 31 Oct 2020 | ECB Boxgym, Hamburg, Germany | |
| 3 | Win | 3–0 | Gabriel Enguema | KO | 3 (6), 2:59 | 20 Sep 2020 | Bartolomeo Best River Resort, Dnipro, Ukraine | |
| 2 | Win | 2–0 | Semen Pakhomov | KO | 2 (6), 1:22 | 1 Aug 2020 | Equides Club, Kyiv, Ukraine | |
| 1 | Win | 1–0 | Andrei Mazanik | KO | 1 (6), 0:55 | 8 Feb 2020 | EWS Arena, Goeppingen, Germany | |

Sporting positions
Regional boxing titles
| Vacant Title last held by Nelson Hysa | WB0 European heavyweight champion 17 January 2026 – present | Incumbent |
