= Marko Milun =

Croatian boxer (born 1996)

Personal information
- Nationality: Croatian
- Born: 28 September 1996 (age 29) Split, Croatia
- Height: 6 ft 3 1/2 in (192 cm)
- Weight: Super-heavyweight

Boxing career
- Stance: Southpaw

Boxing record
- Total fights: 5
- Wins: 4
- Win by KO: 4
- Losses: 1
Medal record
Men's amateur boxing
Representing Croatia
European Games
Bronze medal – third place	2019 Minsk	Super-heavyweight
EU Championships
Bronze medal – third place	2018 Valladolid	Super-heavyweight

Marko Milun (born 28 September 1996) is a Croatian amateur boxer who won bronze medals at the 2018 EU Championships and 2019 European Games.

== Boxing career ==
=== Amateur boxing ===
Milun's first martial art was kickboxing, which he began training in Split. After moving to Zagreb to attend the Police Academy, he started training with a boxing coach Leonard Pijetraj, and fell in love with the sport.

Milun participated in the 2018 Istvan Bocskai Memorial tournament. In the quarter-finals, Milun beat Stanley Koemans by TKO in the first round. He advanced to the semifinals, where he faced Aziz Abbes Mouhiidine. He beat Aziz by split decision. He advanced to the finals, where he lost to Aiboldy Daurenuly. Marko next fought in the European U-22 Boxing Tournament. He beat Vladislav Muravina by split decision, and advanced to the finals, where he fought a rematch with Aziz Abbes Mouhiidine. Aziz won the fight by a majority decision. Milun fought in the EUBC tournament, where he faced Alexei Zavatin in the quarterfinals. He beat him by a unanimous decision, but lost to Frazer Clarke in the semifinals by a unanimous decision in turn.

Marko fought in the 2019 Istvan Bocskai Memorial tournament. He defeated Nurlan Saparbay by split decision in the Ro16. In the quarter-finals, he beat Iman Ramezanpour by majority decision. In the semi-finals he beat Mirko Carbotti by TKO, and faced Andrii Horodetskiy in the finals. He beat Horodetskiy by majority decision to win the tournament.

He took part in the 2019 European Games. He beat Clemente Russo in the first round of the tournament by a dominant unanimous decision. In the second round he beat Alexei Zavatin by unanimous decision. He beat Mikheil Bakhtidze by technical decision in the quarterfinals, and faced Viktor Vykhryst in the semifinals. Vykhryst won the bout by TKO. Milun fought in the 2019 AIBA World Boxing Championships. He managed to beat Jeamie Tshikeva in the Ro16, before losing by a first-round knockout in the quarter-finals to Richard Torrez.

Milun took part in the 2020 Istvan Bocskai Memorial tournament. He beat Christophe Bernier by TKO, and won decision against Nikolay Demich and Damir Toybay to advance to the finals, where he faced Mourad Aliev. He beat Aliev by split decision. In October 2020, Milun participated in the 2. Grand Prix Zagreb. In the semifinals, he won a unanimous decision against Mirko Carbotti. He advanced to the finals, where he won a unanimous decision against Ivan Veryasov. In December 2020, Milun fought in the 2020 Cologne Boxing World Cup. He faced Nelvie Tiafack in the quarterfinals, and lost by majority decision (27:30, 30:27, 30:27, 29:28, 29:28).

On February 24, 2021, Milun fought Mehmetcan Isik in the quarterfinal bout of the Strandja tournament held in Sofia, Bulgaria. He was knocked down by the Turkish fighter 15 seconds into the bout. Despite managing to stand back up during the ten count, the referee decided to stop the match, deeming Milun unable to continue. On June 5, 2021, Milun fought Frazer Clarke in the quarterfinals of the Olympic Qualification tournament. Milun lost by unanimous decision, with all five judges scoring the bout for Clarke.

== Titles ==
- 2018 62. Istvan Bocskai Memorial (silver)
- 2018 European Union Amateur Boxing Championships (bronze)
- 2019 63. Istvan Bocskai Memorial (gold)
- 2019 European Games (bronze)
- 2020 64. Istvan Bocskai Memorial (gold)
- 2020 2. Grand Prix Zagreb (gold)

== Professional boxing record ==
8 fights	7 wins	1 loss
By knockout	7	1
By decision	0	0

No.	Result	Record	Opponent	Type	Round, time	Date	Location	Notes
8	Win	7–1	Piotr Ćwik	RTD	2 (6), 3:00	19 Sep 2026	Zagreb Fair Pavilion 10A, Zagreb, Croatia	
7	Win	6–1	Dragan Đuričković	TKO	1 (6), 1:26	3 May 2026	Sport Complex BK Zagreb, Zagreb, Croatia	
6	Win	5–1	Aleksa Kesić	RTD	3 (6), 3:00	1 Mar 2026	Zagreb Boxing Club, Zagreb, Croatia	
5	Win	4–1	Murat Novalić	TKO	1 (6), 1:55	29 Dec 2025	Svečani Salon Millennium, Odžak, Bosnia and Herzegovina	
4	Win	3–1	Davit Gogishvili	KO	1 (6), 0:55	22 Nov 2025	Vižmarje Brod Hall, Ljubljana, Slovenia	
3	Win	2–1	Drazan Janjanin	TKO	1 (6), 1:05	10 Oct 2025	Tirana Olympic Park, Tirana, Albania	
2	Loss	1–1	Piotr Łącz	KO	1 (6), 2:25	21 Jun 2025	Global Theater Boulevard Riyadh City, Riyadh, Saudi Arabia	WBC Boxing Grand Prix Heavyweight Division Round of 16
1	Win	1–0	Emrullah Kaya	TKO	1 (6), 1:44	20 Apr 2025	Global Theater Boulevard Riyadh City, Riyadh, Saudi Arabia	WBC Boxing Grand Prix Heavyweight Division Round of 32
