= Boxing at the 2019 European Games – Men's +91 kg =

Men's super heavyweight boxing at the 2019 European Games
- Venue: Uruchie Sports Palace
- Date: 21–29 June
- Competitors: 23 from 23 nations

Medalists
gold medal	Victor Vykhryst	Ukraine
silver medal	Mourad Aliev	France
bronze medal	Marko Milun	Croatia
bronze medal	Nelvie Tiafack	Germany

The men's super heavyweight +91 kg boxing event at the 2019 European Games in Minsk was held from 21 to 29 June at the Uruchie Sports Palace.

== Results ==
=== Final ===
Final; 29 June
Victor Vykhryst (UKR)	4
Mourad Aliev (FRA)	1

=== Top half ===
Round of 32; 21 June
Ayoub Ghadfa (ESP)	0
Ivan Veriasov (RUS)	5
Bence Nagy (HUN)	0
Mikheil Bakhtidze (GEO)	5
Marko Milun (CRO)	5
Clemente Russo (ITA)	0

Round of 16; 24 June
Victor Vykhryst (UKR)	5
Ivan Veriasov (RUS)	0
Mantas Valavičius (LTU)	0
Vladan Babić (SRB)	5
Dean Gardiner (IRL)	1
Mikheil Bakhtidze (GEO)	4
Marko Milun (CRO)	5
Alexei Zavatin (MDA)	0

Quarterfinals; 26 June
Victor Vykhryst (UKR)	5
Vladan Babić (SRB)	0
Mikheil Bakhtidze (GEO)	0
Marko Milun (CRO)	5

Semifinals; 28 June
Victor Vykhryst (UKR)	RSC
Marko Milun (CRO)

=== Bottom half ===
Round of 32; 21 June
Evanders Servuts (LAT)	0
Mourad Aliev (FRA)	5
Petar Belberov (BUL)	4
Mahammad Abdullayev (AZE)	1
Gurgen Hovhannisyan (ARM)	3
Dušan Veletić (BIH)	2
Nelvie Tiafack (GER)	5
Adam Kulik (POL)	0

Round of 16; 24 June
Mihai Nistor (ROU)	0
Mourad Aliev (FRA)	5
Petar Belberov (BUL)	5
Viktar Chvarkou (BLR)	0
Mücahit İlyas (TUR)	2
Gurgen Hovhannisyan (ARM)	3
Nelvie Tiafack (GER)	3
Frazer Clarke (GBR)	2

Quarterfinals; 26 June
Mourad Aliev (FRA)	3
Petar Belberov (BUL)	2
Gurgen Hovhannisyan (ARM)	2
Nelvie Tiafack (GER)	3

Semifinals; 28 June
Mourad Aliev (FRA)	4
Nelvie Tiafack (GER)	1
