= Ergezen =

Ergezen is a Turkish surname. Notable people with the surname include:

- Ertuğrul Ergezen (1978–2024), Turkish boxer
- Zeki Ergezen (1949–2020), Turkish architect and politician
