= Yakup Kılıç =

Turkish boxer (born 1986)

Personal information
- Nationality: Turkey
- Born: July 13, 1986 (age 40) Elazığ, Eastern Anatolia
- Height: 1.77 m (5 ft 10 in)
- Weight: 57 kg (126 lb)

Sport
- Sport: Boxing
- Weight class: Featherweight
- Club: Fenerbahçe SK, Istanbul
Medal record
Olympic Games
Bronze medal – third place	2008 Beijing	Featherweight
World Amateur Championships
Bronze medal – third place	2007 Chicago	Featherweight
Mediterranean Games
Bronze medal – third place	2005 Almeíra	Featherweight
Bronze medal – third place	2009 Pescara	Featherweight
EU Amateur Championships
Bronze medal – third place	2007 Dublin	Featherweight

Yakup Kılıç (born July 13, 1986) is a Turkish boxer in the featherweight (57 kg) discipline. He is member of Istanbul Fenerbahçe Boxing Club.

== Career ==
Kılıç participated at the 2005 Mediterranean Games in Almería, Spain and won bronze medal. He boxed another bronze medal at the 2009 Mediterranean Games in Pescara, Italy.

At the European Championships 2006 he lost his first bout against Irish Eric Donovan 29:33.

At the 2007 World Amateur Boxing Championships held in Chicago, United States, he won a bronze medal and qualified for the 2008 Olympics. He did so by beating Arash Usmanee of Canada by a slim one point margin 20–19.

At the Olympics 2008 he lost his semifinal to Vasyl Lomachenko and won Bronze.

=== Olympic Games results ===
2008 (as a featherweight)

- 1st round bye
- Defeated Satoshi Shimizu (Japan) 12–9
- Defeated Abdelkader Chadi (Algeria) 13–6
- Lost to Vasyl Lomachenko (Ukraine) 1–10

=== World Championships results ===
2005 (as a featherweight)

- Defeated Aboubakr Seddik Lbida (Morocco) 29–20
- Lost to Berik Serikbayev (Kazakhstan) 25–29

2007 (as a featherweight)

- Defeated Pablo Figuls (Costa Rica) RSCO 3
- Defeated Arash Usmanee (Canada) 20–19
- Defeated Sailom Ardee (Thailand) 22–13
- Lost to Albert Selimov (Russia) walk-over (placed 3rd)
