= Oleksandr Zakhozhyi =

Ukrainian boxer (born 1993)

Personal information
- Nickname: Hunter
- Born: 7 September 1993 (age 33) Zaporizhzhia, Ukraine
- Height: 6 ft 9 in (206 cm)
- Weight: Heavyweight

Boxing career
- Stance: Orthodox

Boxing record
- Total fights: 21
- Wins: 20
- Win by KO: 16
- Losses: 1

Oleksandr Zakhozhyi (born 7 September 1993) is a Ukrainian professional boxer. At regional level, he held the European heavyweight title in 2024.

== Professional career ==
He held the European heavyweight title from 13 April 2024 until 23 November 2024. Zakhozhyi also held the WBC Francophone heavyweight title in 2021.

== Professional boxing record ==
21 fights	20 wins	1 loss
By knockout	16	0
By decision	4	1

No.	Result	Record	Opponent	Type	Round, time	Date	Location	Notes
21	Win	20–1	Apisit Sangmuang	TKO	2 (8), 2:48	26 Oct 2025	Singmanassak Muaythai School, Pathum Thani, Thailand	
20	Loss	19–1	Labinot Xhoxhaj	UD	12	23 Nov 2024	Olympiastuetzpunkt, Heidelberg, Germany	Lost European heavyweight title
19	Win	19–0	Granit Shala	KO	2 (12), 2:25	13 Apr 2024	AGON Sportpark, Berlin, Germany	Won vacant European heavyweight title
18	Win	18–0	Muhammed Ali Durmaz	KO	3 (8), 2:02	25 Mar 2023	Grand Elysée, Hamburg, Germany	
17	Win	17–0	Evgenios Lazaridis	TKO	1 (8), 2:42	26 Mar 2022	Westfalenhalle, Dortmund, Germany	
16	Win	16–0	Pavel Sour	TKO	3 (10), 1:15	22 Jan 2022	Boxclub Home Of Champions-Ka, Eggenstein-Leopoldshafen, Germany	
15	Win	15–0	Sergiej Werwejko	TKO	1 (10), 1:19	17 Apr 2021	Boxclub Home Of Champions-Ka, Eggenstein-Leopoldshafen, Germany	Won vacant WBC Francophone heavyweight title
14	Win	14–0	Kostiantyn Dovbyshchenko	UD	8	1 Aug 2020	Equides Club, Lesniki, Ukraine	
13	Win	13–0	Kevin Johnson	UD	8	11 Oct 2019	Palazzohalle, Karlsruhe, Germany	
12	Win	12–0	Srdan Govedarica	KO	2 (8), 1:01	15 Jun 2019	Parkovy Convention Centre, Kyiv, Ukraine	
11	Win	11–0	Mariano Ruben Diaz Strunz	TKO	8 (8), 2:22	27 Apr 2019	Palazzohalle, Karlsruhe, Germany	
10	Win	10–0	Irineu Beato Costa Junior	KO	3 (8), 1:43	15 Dec 2018	Parkovy Convention Centre, Kyiv, Ukraine	
9	Win	9–0	Rihards Bigis	TKO	1 (6), 2:50	14 Sep 2018	Palazzohalle, Karlsruhe, Germany	
8	Win	8–0	Ivan Lysytsia	UD	6	17 Jun 2018	Parkovy Convention Centre, Kyiv, Ukraine	
7	Win	7–0	Giorgi Kopadze	TKO	3 (6), 0:39	10 Mar 2018	Palazzohalle, Karlsruhe, Germany	
6	Win	6–0	Zoltan Csala	KO	1 (6), 1:29	7 Jan 2018	Mach1, Karlsruhe, Germany	
5	Win	5–0	Milos Dovedan	KO	1 (6), 1:42	18 Nov 2017	Karlsberg FanHalle Nord, Kaiserslautern, Germany	
4	Win	4–0	Drazan Janjanin	KO	2 (6), 2:14	11 Nov 2017	Werner-Seelenbinder-Sportpark, Berlin, Germany	
3	Win	3–0	Irakli Gvenetadze	UD	6	12 Aug 2017	Fischbachhalle, Saarbrücken, Germany	
2	Win	2–0	Tomas Mrazek	TKO	4 (6), 1:10	22 Jul 2017	Karlsruhe, Germany	
1	Win	1–0	Davit Gogishvili	KO	1 (6)	17 Jun 2017	Pabellón Municipal, Peniscola, Spain	

Sporting positions
Regional boxing titles
Vacant Title last held by Dillon Carman	WBC Francophone heavyweight champion 17 April 2021 – June 2023; Vacated	Vacant Title next held by Kacper Meyna
Vacant Title last held by Agit Kabayel	European heavyweight champion 13 April 2024 – 23 November 2024	Succeeded by Labinot Xhoxhaj
