= Damla Günay =

Turkish archer (born 1982)

Medal record

Women's Archery

Mediterranean Games
Silver medal – second place	2005 Almería, Spain	Team

Damla Günay (born 24 November 1982) is a Turkish archer.

Günay represented Turkey at the 2004 Summer Olympics. She placed 42nd in the women's individual ranking round with a 72-arrow score of 620. In the first round of elimination, she faced 23rd-ranked Anja Hitzler of Germany. Günay lost 163-152 in the 18-arrow match, placing 38th overall in women's individual archery. She was also a member of the 10th-place Turkish women's archery team.

Günay participated at the 2005 Mediterranean Games in Almería, Spain ranking 14th in the women's individual category. With the Turkish team, she won silver medal.

== International achievements ==
- 2004, Italy - Indoors European Championship: 8th.
- 2004, Italy - Grand Prix: 26th.
- 2004, Belgium - European Championship: 5th (the qualifier for 2004 Summer Olympics)
- 2004, Germany - Grand Prix: 53rd.
