= Archery at the 2005 Mediterranean Games =

Archery at the 2005 Mediterranean Games was held in the Emilio Campra Youth Stadium in Almería, Spain from June 28 to June 30, 2005.

== Medallists and results ==
=== Men's competition ===
Rank	Name	RR Score/Rank	1/16	1/8	1/4	1/2	Final	Finals
1st place, gold medalist(s)	Marco Galiazzo (ITA)	641 / 3	BYE	170	114	111	95	(320)
2nd place, silver medalist(s)	Romain Girouille (FRA)	636 / 4	BYE	160	110	105	88	(303)
3rd place, bronze medalist(s)	Yoann Palermo (FRA)	626 / 8	BYE	159	109	104	105	(318)
4	Matej Povz (SLO)	11 / 18	149	161	107	107	104	(318)
5	Ilario Di Buò (ITA)	654 / 1	BYE	163	108	-	-	-
6	Elias Cobo (ESP)	615 / 12	BYE	162	104	-	-	-
7	Doğan Gürsel (TUR)	621 / 10	BYE	159	102	-	-	-
8	Germain Beauge (FRA)	632 / 6	BYE	158	101	-	-	-
9	Michele Frangilli (ITA)	653 / 2	BYE	160	-	-	-	-
10	Apostolos Nanos (GRE)	624 / 9	BYE	159	-	-	-	-
11	Tunç Küçükkayalar (TUR)	634 / 5	BYE	158	-	-	-	-
12	Matej Zupanc (SLO)	555 / 16	161	157	-	-	-	-
13	Kresimir Strukelj (CRO)	627 / 7	BYE	155	-	-	-	-
14	Mehmet Darılmaz (TUR)	610 / 14	BYE	153	-	-	-	-
15	Felipe Lopez (ESP)	618 / 11	BYE	150	-	-	-	-
16	Andrés Gómez (ESP)	612 / 13	BYE	149	-	-	-	-
17	Matija Zlender (SLO)	547 / 17	150	-	-	-	-	-
18	Josip Jakopovic (CRO)	594 / 15	148	-	-	-	-	-

=== Women's competition ===
Event	Gold	Silver	Bronze
Women Individual	(Spain) Almudena Gallardo	(Italy) Natalia Valeeva	(Turkey) Derya Bard Sarıaltın
Women Team	Italy	Turkey	Slovenia

== Medal table ==
Rank	Nation	Gold	Silver	Bronze	Total
1	Italy (ITA)	2	1	0	3
2	Spain (ESP)	1	0	0	1
3	France (FRA)	0	1	1	2
3	Turkey (TUR)	0	1	1	2
5	Slovenia (SLO)	0	0	1	1
Totals (5 entries)		3	3	3	9
