= Devin Vargas =

American boxer

Personal information
- Born: December 25, 1981 (age 44) Toledo, Ohio, U.S.
- Height: 6 ft 3 1/2 in (192 cm)
- Weight: Heavyweight

Boxing career
- Reach: 75 1/2 in (192 cm)
- Stance: Orthodox

Boxing record
- Total fights: 33
- Wins: 24
- Win by KO: 9
- Losses: 17
- Draws: 0
Medal record
Men's amateur boxing
Representing United States
Pan American Games
Bronze medal – third place	2003 Santo Domingo	Heavyweight
Pan American Championships
Gold medal – first place	2001 San Juan	Heavyweight
US Olympic Trials
Gold medal – first place	2004 Tunica	Heavyweight
American Boxing Classic
Gold medal – first place	2003 Waukesha	Heavyweight
Copenhagen Cup
Silver medal – second place	2002 Roskilde	Heavyweight
U.S. Challenge
Bronze medal – third place	2001 Lake Placid	Heavyweight
Silver medal – second place	2002 Colorado Springs	Heavyweight
Gold medal – first place	2003 Colorado Springs	Heavyweight
U.S. National Championships
Silver medal – second place	2001 Colorado Springs	Heavyweight
Silver medal – second place	2002 Las Vegas	Heavyweight
Gold medal – first place	2003 Colorado Springs	Heavyweight
Golden Gloves
Gold medal – first place	2000 Detroit	Heavyweight
Gold medal – first place	2001 Reno	Heavyweight
Bronze medal – third place	2002 Denver	Heavyweight
Bronze medal – third place	2003 Las Vegas	Heavyweight

Devin Vargas (born December 25, 1981) is an American professional boxer. As an amateur, he won a bronze medal at the 2003 Pan American Games. He also represented the United States at the 2004 Olympics.

== Amateur career ==
Before turning professional, Vargas was the National Golden Gloves Heavyweight Champion in 2000 and 2001. In 2003 he stopped Mike Marrone but was stopped inside the distance by eventual winner Charles Ellis. He became US champion in 2003. In international fights he lost twice to Kertson Manswell in 2003 but beat him in 2004 to qualify for the Olympics.

Vargas qualified for the Olympic Games by ending up in first place at the 1st AIBA American 2004 Olympic Qualifying Tournament in Tijuana, Mexico. He competed at the 2004 Olympics in Athens as a heavyweight representing the United States. His results were:

- 1st round - Defeated Rachid El Haddak (Morocco) RSC-3 (1:20)
- 2nd round - Lost to Viktar Zuyev (Belarus) 27-36

== Professional career ==
Vargas turned professional in 2004. He sustained his first defeat by a ranked opponent, Kevin Johnson, in a May 15, 2009 bout. It became clear early in the fight that Vargas was in over his head, being dropped in the 3rd—giving Johnson a massive lead—and again in the 5th round. Bloody and bruised during the latter, Vargas looked like a beaten man, and it was evident that the end was near. The end came with a flurry of combinations unleashed by Johnson early in the 6th round, thus scoring Johnson a TKO; had the fight been left to continue, it would have resulted in knock out. Mercy came when Vargas's corner saw the writing on the wall and, with a toss of a white towel, ended this mismatch, sparing Vargas further injury.

== Personal life ==
He is the younger brother of boxer Dallas Vargas.

== Professional boxing record ==
34 fights	23 wins	11 losses
By knockout	10	8
By decision	12	3
By disqualification	1	0

No.	Result	Record	Opponent	Type	Round, time	Date	Location	Notes
34	Win	23–11	Santander Silgado Gelez	RTD	2 (6), 3:00	Aug 30, 2025	Huntington Center, Toledo, Ohio, U.S.	
33	Loss	22–11	Jermaine Franklin	RTD	6 (10), 3:00	May 23, 2024	Wayne State Fieldhouse, Detroit, Michigan, U.S.	
32	Loss	22–10	Deontae Pettigrew	UD	6	Jul 7, 2023	Donald Stephens Center, Rosemont, Illinois, U.S.	
31	Loss	22–9	Deontae Pettigrew	UD	6	Apr 8, 2023	Donald Stephens Center, Rosemont, Illinois, U.S.	
30	Loss	22–8	Charles Martin	KO	4 (8), 1:59	Sep 4, 2022	Crypto.com Arena, Los Angeles, California, U.S.	
29	Loss	22–7	Zhilei Zhang	KO	4 (10), 0:49	Nov 7, 2020	Seminole Hard Rock Hotel and Casino, Hollywood, Florida, U.S.	
28	Win	22–6	Victor Bisbal	DQ	8 (8), 1:02	Jan 18, 2020	Turning Stone Resort & Casino, Verona, New York, U.S.	Bisbal disqualified for repeated low blows
27	Loss	21–6	Junior Fa	UD	10	Nov 15, 2019	Salt Palace Convention Center, Salt Lake City, Utah, U.S.	For WBO Oriental interim heavyweight title
26	Win	21–5	Niall Kennedy	TKO	5 (10), 2:58	Aug 17, 2019	MGM Springfield, Springfield, Massachusetts, U.S.	
25	Loss	20–5	Andy Ruiz Jr.	KO	1 (8), 1:38	Mar 10, 2018	StubHub Center, Carson, California, U.S.	
24	Win	20–4	Galen Brown	KO	1 (8), 2:11	Nov 4, 2017	Buckhead Fight Club, Atlanta, Georgia, U.S.	
23	Win	19–4	Tommy Washington Jr	UD	6	Apr 8, 2017	St. Clement's Hall, Toledo, Ohio, U.S.	
22	Loss	18–4	Dominic Breazeale	TKO	3 (10), 2:26	Jun 21, 2014	StubHub Center, Carson, California, U.S.	
21	Loss	18–3	Jason Bergman	TKO	3 (10), 2:20	Mar 28, 2014	Serbian American Cultural Center, Weirton, West Virginia, U.S.	For NABA USA heavyweight title
20	Loss	18–2	Andrzej Wawrzyk	TKO	9 (10), 1:40	Sep 10, 2011	Stadion Miejski, Wrocław, Poland	
19	Win	18–1	Terrell Nelson	UD	8	Sep 30, 2009	Russo's On The Bay, Howard Beach, New York, U.S.	
18	Loss	17–1	Kevin Johnson	TKO	6 (10), 2:23	May 15, 2009	Harrah's Marina Hotel Casino, Atlantic City, New Jersey, U.S.	
17	Win	17–0	Boris Shishporenak	UD	6	Mar 14, 2009	Duke Energy Convention Center, Cincinnati, U.S.	
16	Win	16–0	Dave Brunelli	TKO	1 (8), 1:31	May 9, 2008	Ballys Park Place Hotel Casino, Atlantic City, New Jersey, U.S.	
15	Win	15–0	Charles Davis	UD	8	Feb 9, 2008	Aquarius Hotel, Laughlin, Nevada, U.S.	
14	Win	14–0	Earl Ladson	UD	6	Dec 5, 2007	Seminole Hard Rock Hotel and Casino, Hollywood, Florida, U.S.	
13	Win	13–0	Josh Gutcher	TKO	4 (6), 1:30	Oct 2, 2007	Bourbon Street, Merrionette Park, Illinois, U.S.	
12	Win	12–0	Mujaheed Moore	UD	6	Aug 16, 2007	Riverfront Hotel, Toledo, Ohio, U.S.	
11	Win	11–0	David Saulsberry	TKO	2 (4)	Nov 2, 2006	Washington Hilton & Towers, Washington, D.C., U.S.	
10	Win	10–0	Chris Riley	UD	4	Aug 11, 2006	Mountaineer Casino Racetrack and Resort, Chester, West Virginia, U.S.	
9	Win	9–0	Dione Craig	UD	6	May 13, 2006	Sports Arena, Toledo, Ohio, U.S.	
8	Win	8–0	Ed Perry	MD	4	Dec 30, 2005	Mountaineer Casino Racetrack and Resort, Chester, West Virginia, U.S.	
7	Win	7–0	Albert Newberry	KO	1 (6), 0:30	Dec 7, 2005	Martins West, Woodlawn, Maryland, U.S.	
6	Win	6–0	David Cleage	SD	4	Oct 19, 2005	Andiamo’s, Warren, Michigan, U.S.	
5	Win	5–0	Dione Craig	UD	4	Oct 15, 2005	Grand Victoria Casino, Rising Sun, Indiana, U.S.	
4	Win	4–0	David Johnson	UD	4	Aug 18, 2005	HP Pavilion, San Jose, California, U.S.	
3	Win	3–0	Andrew Solano	TKO	1 (4), 1:34	Jul 15, 2005	Gund Arena, Cleveland, Ohio, U.S.	
2	Win	2–0	Charles Brown	KO	1 (4)	Apr 16, 2005	Sports Arena, Toledo, Ohio, U.S.	
1	Win	1–0	Adam Smith	KO	1 (4), 2:43	Nov 26, 2004	Sports Arena, Toledo, Ohio, U.S.	

Sporting positions
Preceded by B.J. Flores	United States Amateur Heavyweight Champion; 2003	Succeeded by Matt Godfrey
