= Yaser Shigan =

Syrian boxer

Personal information
- Born: August 17, 1976 (age 49)
Medal record
Men's Boxing
Representing Syria
Mediterranean Games
Gold medal – first place	2005 Almería	Featherweight

Yaser Shigan (born August 17, 1976) is a Syrian boxer, who won the only gold medal for Syria at the 2005 Mediterranean Games in Almería, Spain. In the final of the men's featherweight division (– 57 kg) he defeated former Romanian Ovidiu Bobîrnat, who now competes for Cyprus.
