= Labinot Xhoxhaj =

Kosovan boxer (born 1993)

Personal information
- Born: 4 March 1993 (age 33) Kosovo
- Height: 6 ft (183 cm)
- Weight: Cruiserweight; Heavyweight

Boxing career
- Stance: Orthodox

Boxing record
- Total fights: 23
- Wins: 22
- Win by KO: 17
- Draws: 1

Labinot Xhoxhaj (born 4 March 1993) is a Kosovan professional boxer. At regional level, he has held the European heavyweight title since 2024.

== Professional career ==
=== European champion ===
==== Xhoxhaj vs. Zakhozhyi ====
Previously viewed as an obscure fighter, with a limited and unsuccessful amateur career, Xhoxhaj is considered a surprise champion. Both his opponent for the European title and his first challenger were seen as the favorites, and the more promising prospects, at the time of their fights. Oleksandr Zakhozhyi, in particular, was speculated to have taken him lightly, in his title defense against Xhoxhaj. Xhoxhaj won the European heavyweight title on 23 November 2024, defeating defending champion Zakhozhyi by unanimous decision at Olympiastuetzpunkt in Heidelberg, Germany.

==== Xhoxhaj vs. Aliev ====
Mourad Aliev, a contender with a distinguished amateur background, also spoke openly about his ambitions to achieve at the world level after defeating Xhoxhaj and claiming his title, prior to their fight. He was quoted in ring magazine, stating: "Xhoxhaj is unbeaten and the reigning European champion. So, he's a good fighter and I will not underestimate him. At the same time, I know about my own qualities and am sure that I will beat him… The European title has such a great history that I see it as a very important step on my way to the world title."

Subsequent ringside commentary, during the fight, noted Aliev seeming to find his opponent "tougher than he expected", as Labinot continued to prove tenacious, before ultimately defeating Aliev by unanimous decision.

==== Xhoxhaj vs. Seifkhani ====
Xhoxhaj successfully defended the title a second time by knocking out Pezhman Seifkhani in the fourth round at Hallensportzentrum in Lahr, Germany, on 14 February 2026.

== Fighting style ==
Xhoxhaj’s straightforward, pressure-heavy style is considered in-keeping with his smaller stature and modest background in the sport, relying mostly on a tight guard and a willingness to exchange punches, with only a modicum of head movement. As such, his best opponents have had some success, with their more polished combination punching.

However, Labinot’s readiness to take punishment and embrace "gritty" fighting, without abandoning his game plan, tends to stop his fights from ever becoming one-sided, even to the point of discouraging these seemingly more skilled boxers. Oleksandr Zakhozhyi was described as succumbing to exhaustion, in the face of Xhoxhaj’s surprising effectiveness, and as seeming to accept that he had lost their fight, even before the final two rounds were finished.

== Professional boxing record ==
23 fights	22 wins	0 losses
By knockout	17	0
By decision	5	0
Draws	1	

No.	Result	Record	Opponent	Type	Round, time	Date	Location	Notes
23	Win	22–0–1	Pezhman Seifkhani	KO	4 (12), 3:00	14 Feb 2026	Hallensportzentrum, Lahr, Germany	Retained European heavyweight title
22	Win	21–0–1	Mourad Aliev	UD	12	7 Jun 2025	Universum Gym, Hamburg, Germany	Retained European heavyweight title; Won WBC International Silver heavyweight title
21	Win	20–0–1	Oleksandr Zakhozhyi	UD	12	23 Nov 2024	Olympiastuetzpunkt, Heidelberg, Germany	Won European heavyweight title
20	Win	19–0–1	Vaclav Trojacek	TKO	2 (8), 1:34	28 Sep 2024	MHP Arena, Ludwigsburg, Germany	
19	Win	18–0–1	Semir Dautovic	TKO	3 (8), 1:59	27 Apr 2024	KIA Metropol Arena, Nuremberg, Germany	
18	Draw	17–0–1	Milosav Savic	SD	8	27 May 2023	Helios Arena, Villingen-Schwenningen, Germany	
17	Win	17–0	Anton Sjomkin	KO	2 (6), 0:51	14 Jan 2023	RT Mehrzweckhalle, Regensburg, Germany	
16	Win	16–0	Marko Mononen	KO	1 (8), 2:05	27 Dec 2021	Palestra Karagac, Peja, Kosovo	Won vacant UBO International cruiserweight title
15	Win	15–0	Ferenc Urban	KO	8 (10), 1:02	10 Jul 2021	Restaurant Glatthof, Glattbrug, Switzerland	
14	Win	14–0	Tamas Lodi	RTD	4 (10), 3:00	27 Dec 2020	Palestra Karagac, Peja, Kosovo	Won vacant UBF Inter-Continental heavyweight title
13	Win	13–0	Predrag Jevtic	UD	8	5 Oct 2019	Restaurant Glatthof, Glattbrug, Switzerland	
12	Win	12–0	Flavio Morri	KO	4 (8), 1:55	18 May 2019	Palestra Comunale Semine, Bellinzona, Switzerland	
11	Win	11–0	Milans Volkovs	TKO	3 (6), 2:30	23 Mar 2019	Schuleinheit Hirzel, Horgen, Switzerland	
10	Win	10–0	Mirza Mrkonjic	TKO	1 (6), 1:25	23 Feb 2019	Restaurant Glatthof, Glattbrug, Switzerland	
9	Win	9–0	Ervin Dzinic	TKO	5 (8), 1:30	26 May 2018	Restaurant Glatthof, Glattbrug, Switzerland	
8	Win	8–0	Jakub Synek	TKO	2 (8), 2:00	7 Apr 2018	Landihalle, Uster, Switzerland	
7	Win	7–0	Jozsef Darmos	MD	8	17 Feb 2018	Restaurant Glatthof, Glattbrug, Switzerland	
6	Win	6–0	Davit Ribakoni	TKO	4 (6), 2:54	9 Dec 2017	Grand Casino, Basel, Switzerland	
5	Win	5–0	Zoran Petkovic	TKO	2 (4), 1:12	23 Jun 2017	Sports Hall, Prijedor, Bosnia and Herzegovina	
4	Win	4–0	Giacomo Fucchi	UD	6	27 May 2017	Palestra Centro Scolastico, Riazzino, Switzerland	
3	Win	3–0	Ramazi Gogichashvili	TKO	5 (6), 2:18	1 Apr 2017	Krauerhalle Kriens, Lucerne, Switzerland	
2	Win	2–0	Giorgi Tevdorashvili	TKO	3 (6), 1:04	26 Nov 2016	Loewensaal, Nuremberg, Germany	
1	Win	1–0	Shalva Meleksishvili	RTD	2 (4), 3:00	2 Jul 2016	Loewensaal, Nuremberg, Germany	

Sporting positions
Regional boxing titles
Vacant Title last held by Laudelino Barros	UBF Inter-Continental heavyweight champion 27 December 2020 – June 2026; Vacated	Vacant Title next held by Kamenko Juran
Vacant Title last held by Christian Demaj	UBO International cruiserweight champion 27 December 2021 – May 2022; Vacated	Vacant Title next held by Metin Turunc
Preceded by Oleksandr Zakhozhyi	European heavyweight champion 23 November 2024 – present	Incumbent
Preceded by Mourad Aliev	WBC International Silver heavyweight champion 7 June 2025 – May 2026; Vacated	Vacant Title next held by Mourad Aliev
