= 2003 European Union Amateur Boxing Championships =

Boxing competitions

2003 Men's European Union Boxing Championships
- Host city: Strasbourg
- Country: France
- Dates: 10–14 June

The Men's 2003 European Union Amateur Boxing Championships were held in Strasbourg, France from June 10 to June 14. The first edition of the annual competition was organised by the European governing body for amateur boxing, EABA.

== Medal winners ==
Event	Gold	Silver	Bronze
Light Flyweight (– 48 kilograms)	Abdulkadir Kocak; Turkey	Redouane Asloum; France	None awarded
Flyweight (– 51 kilograms)	Jérôme Thomas; France	Wiaczesław Molis; Estonia	Felipe Martinez; Spain Don Broadhurst; England
Bantamweight (– 54 kilograms)	Ali Hallab; France	Bashir Hassan; Sweden	Wilhelm Gratschow; Germany (Republic of Ireland) Brian Gillan; Ireland
Featherweight (– 57 kilograms)	Mejid Jelili; Sweden	David Mulholland; England	Ahmet Turan; Turkey Jani Turunen; Finland
Lightweight (– 60 kilograms)	Selçuk Aydın; Turkey	Devis Boschiero; Italy	Guillaume Salingue; France (Republic of Ireland) Andrew Murray; Ireland
Light Welterweight (– 64 kilograms)	Willy Blain; France	(Republic of Ireland) Paul McCloskey; Ireland	Fernando Zamora Brunet; Italy Albert Starikow; Estonia
Welterweight (– 69 kilograms)	Bülent Ulusoy; Turkey	Xavier Noel; France	Donatas Bondorovas; Lithuania Francisco Martinez Diaz; Spain
Middleweight (– 75 kilograms)	Serdar Üstüner; Turkey	Mamadou Diambang; France	Ricardo Samms; England Aleksander Rubiuk; Estonia
Light Heavyweight (– 81 kilograms)	İhsan Yıldırım Tarhan; Turkey	(Republic of Ireland) Kenneth Egan; Ireland	John Dovi; France Boubacar Kamara; Sweden
Heavyweight (– 91 kilograms)	Vitaljus Subacius; Lithuania	Andreas Gustavsson; Sweden	(Republic of Ireland) Alan Reynolds; Ireland Spyridon Kladouchas; Greece
Super Heavyweight (+ 91 kilograms)	Modo Sallah; Sweden	Sebastian Köber; Germany	Ahmet Aksu; Turkey Mehdi Aouiche; France
