= Piotr Łącz =

Polish boxer (born 1998)

Personal information
- Born: 11 February 1998 (age 28) Bielsko-Biała, Poland
- Height: 5 ft 11 in (180 cm)
- Weight: Heavyweight

Boxing career
- Reach: 75 in (191 cm)
- Stance: Orthodox

Boxing record
- Total fights: 16
- Wins: 15
- Win by KO: 11
- Draws: 1
- No contests: 0

Piotr Łącz (born 11 February 1998) is a Polish professional boxer

== Professional career ==
Piotr made his professional debut on 21 May 2021 against fellow countryman Konrad Cupriak. Łącz would go on to win the fight via TKO in the second round.

He would return two months later to take on Czech boxer, Alain Banongo. Łącz would win via yet another second round TKO.

After an eight month hiatus, Łącz returned to the ring in a bout against Bosnia and Herzegovina's Abdulnaser Delalić. Łącz would win via his third TKO in a row, once again in the second round.

He would return three months later in a bout against France's Morgan Dessaux. Łącz would win via a second round KO for the second time and thus improving his record to 4–0.

His next fight came four months later, where he faced off against Croatia's Toni Visić. Łącz would win via Knockout in the first minute of the first round.

Six months later, he would fight against Bosnia's Miloš Budinić on the undercard of Łukasz Różański vs. Alen Babić. Łącz would win via TKO in the first minute of the first round.

After two fights, Łącz would have his first fight in the United States, when he faced American boxer Demetrius Banks. Łącz would win the fight via TKO in the third round.

He would return a month later, where he faced off against Joe Jones in Queens, New York. Łącz would win via Unanimous Decision.

Five months later, Łącz would fight in his native Poland where he took on Ukrainian-Polish boxer, Sergiej Werwejko. Łącz would win via TKO in the fourth round.

Two months later, he would return to the United States to fight Lemir Isom-Riley. Łącz would win via TKO in the sixth round.

=== WBC Boxing Grand Prix ===
On 12 April 2025, it was announced that Łącz would participate in the first ever WBC Boxing Grand Prix. He competed in the heavyweight division.

In the first round, he faced off against Belgium's Michael Pirotton in the Round of 32. Łącz would win the fight via Unanimous Decision, and thus advancing to the Round of 16.

In the next round, he faced Croatia's Marko Milun in the Round of 16. Łącz would win the fight via a first-round knockout, and thus advancing to the Quarterfinals.

In the next round, he faced Argentina's Kevin Ramirez. The fight went to a split draw on two scorecards, and on the third, Ramirez won. However, the fight is marked as a draw on Łącz's record despite not going through to the semifinals.

== Professional boxing record ==
16 fights	15 wins	0 losses
By knockout	11	0
By decision	4	0
Draws	1	

No.	Result	Record	Opponent	Type	Round, time	Date	Location	Notes
16	Win	15–0–1	Dominique Valera	TKO	1 (8), 2:05	28 Feb 2026	The Paramount, Huntington, New York, U.S.	
15	Draw	14–0–1	Kevin Ramirez	SD	6	13 Aug 2025	Cool Arena, Riyadh, Saudi Arabia	WBC Boxing Grand Prix Heavyweight Division Quarterfinals.
14	Win	14–0	Marko Milun	KO	1 (6), 2:25	21 Jun 2025	Cool Arena, Riyadh, Saudi Arabia	WBC Boxing Grand Prix Heavyweight Division Round of 16
13	Win	13–0	Michael Pirotton	UD	6	20 Apr 2025	Global Theater Boulevard Riyadh City, Riyadh, Saudi Arabia	WBC Boxing Grand Prix Heavyweight Division Round of 32
12	Win	12–0	Lemir Isom-Riley	TKO	6 (8), 2:01	6 Dec 2024	Melrose Ballroom, Queens, New York, U.S.	
11	Win	11–0	Sergiej Werwejko	TKO	4 (8), 0:33	26 Oct 2024	Nosalowy Dwór, Zakopane, Poland	
10	Win	10–0	Joe Jones	UD	8	31 May 2024	Melrose Ballroom, Queens, New York, U.S.	
9	Win	9–0	Demetrius Banks	TKO	3 (6), 1:20	13 Apr 2024	The Dome at the Ballpark, Rosemont, Illinois, U.S.	
8	Win	8–0	Pavlo Krolenko	UD	6	24 Feb 2024	Opera i Filharmonia Podlaska, Białystok, Poland	
7	Win	7–0	Volodymyr Katsuk	UD	6	7 Oct 2023	Hala Widowiskowo-Sportowa, Jastrzębie-Zdrój, Poland	
6	Win	6–0	Miloš Budinić	KO	1 (6), 0:47	22 Apr 2023	G2A Arena, Rzeszów, Poland	
5	Win	5–0	Toni Visić	KO	1 (6), 0:58	29 Oct 2022	Nosalowy Dwór, Zakopane, Poland	
4	Win	4–0	Morgan Dessaux	KO	2 (4), 1:33	24 Jun 2022	Hala Legionów, Kielce, Poland	
3	Win	3–0	Abdulnaser Delalić	TKO	2 (4), 1:17	26 Mar 2022	Opera i Filharmonia Podlaska, Białystok, Poland	
2	Win	2–0	Alain Banongo	KO	2 (4), 2:30	9 Jul 2021	Hala Widowiskowo-Sportowa, Turek, Poland	
1	Win	1–0	Konrad Cupriak	TKO	2 (4), 1:36	21 May 2021	Hala Sportowa, Pionki, Poland	
