= Savaş Kaya =

Turkish boxer (born 1986)

Personal information
- Nationality: Turkish
- Born: June 2, 1986 (age 40) Turkey
- Weight: Super Middleweight

Boxing career

Boxing record
- Total fights: 3
- Wins: 3
- Win by KO: 2
- Losses: 0
- Draws: 0
- No contests: 0

Olympic medal record

Men's Boxing

Representing Turkey

Mediterranean Games
Silver medal – second place	2005 Almeíra	Middleweight

Savaş Kaya (born June 2, 1986) is a Turkish boxer.

== Amateur ==
Savaş Kaya won silver medal the 2005 Mediterranean Games

== Professional boxing record ==
3 Wins (2 Knockouts), 0 Defeats, 0 Draws
Result	Opponent	Date	Type	Round	Location	Notes	Win	(Czech Republic) Tomas Kugler	05/06/2010	UD	4/4	Abdi İpekçi Arena, Istanbul, Turkey	Win	(United States) Jose Laguer	04/12/2009	KO	1/4	LaCovacha, Miami, Florida, United States	Win	(Romania) Christian Valea	11/07/2009	TKO	2/4	BJK Akatlar Arena, Istanbul, Turkey
