= Spyridon Kladouchas =

Greek boxer (born 1980)

Personal information
- Nationality: Greek
- Born: 11 October 1980 (age 45) Athens, Greece

Sport
- Sport: Boxing
Medal record
European Union Amateur Boxing Championships
Bronze medal – third place	2003 Strasbourg	Heavyweight
2nd AIBA European 2004 Olympic Qualifying Tournament
Bronze medal – third place	2004 Warsaw	Heavyweight

Spyridon Kladouchas (born 11 October 1980) is a Greek boxer. He competed in the men's heavyweight event at the 2004 Summer Olympics. Kladouchas has also won the bronze medal in 2003 European Union Amateur Boxing Championships which took place in Strasbourg. In 1998, 2002 and 2003 he won the gold medal in the Greek National Championship.
