= Viktar Zuyev =

Belarusian boxer (born 1983)

Personal information
- Nationality: Belarus
- Born: May 22, 1983 (age 43) Vitebsk, Soviet Union

Sport
- Sport: Boxing
- Weight class: Heavyweight; Super Heavyweight
Medal record
Men's Boxing
Representing Belarus
Olympic Games
Silver medal – second place	2004 Athens	Heavyweight
World Amateur Championships
Bronze medal – third place	2003 Bangkok	Heavyweight
Bronze medal – third place	2009 Milan	Super Heavyweight
European Amateur Championships
Silver medal – second place	2004 Pula	Heavyweight
Silver medal – second place	2010 Moscow	Super Heavyweight
Bronze medal – third place	2002 Perm	Heavyweight
Bronze medal – third place	2013 Minsk	Super Heavyweight

Viktor Valeryevich Zuyev, also spelled sometimes as Viktar Valeryevich Zuyeu (Belarusian: Ві́ктар Вале́р'евіч Зу́еў, romanized: Viktar Valeryevich Zuyew, Łacinka: Viktar Valierjevič Zujeŭ; Russian: Ви́ктор Вале́рьевич Зу́ев; born May 22, 1983) is a former amateur boxer from Belarus, best known for winning the heavyweight silver medal at the 2004 Summer Olympics in Athens, Greece.

== Career ==
The southpaw won a silver medal at the Euro 2004.

Olympic Results 2004:

- Defeated Daniel Betti (Italy) RSC 1 (1:15)
- Defeated Devin Vargas (United States) 36–27
- Defeated Mohamed Elsayed (Egypt) walkover, Elsayed broke his arm in the quarterfinal.
- Lost to Odlanier Solis Fonte (Cuba) 13–22

Since then he has suffered several setbacks. In 2005, he lost at the world championships early to Cuban Luis Ortiz.

In 2006, Zuyev suffered a KO 1 to Elchin Alizade at the Euros.

In 2007, at the world championships he exited early against Lithuania's Vitalijus Subacius.

In 2008, he turned the tables on Subacius and beat him in a qualifier to punch his Olympic ticket. In Beijing, he ran right into Clemente Russo and lost 1:7.

=== Super Heavyweight ===
At the 2009 World Amateur Boxing Championships he competed at super heavyweight and reached the semifinal vs Didier Bence, Marko Tomasović (KO1) and Denis Sergeev. There he again fell by KO1, this time to Olympic Gold medallist Roberto Cammarelle.
