= Boxing at the 2005 Mediterranean Games =

Boxing competition

- Location: Almería, Spain
- Dates: 27 June – 2 July 2005

The Boxing Tournament at the 2005 Mediterranean Games was held in the Los Ángeles Sports Hall in Almería, Spain from June 27 to July 2.

== Medal winners ==
Event	Gold	Silver	Bronze
Light Flyweight (– 48 kilograms)	Alfonso Pinto; Italy	Amjad Aouda; Syria	Kelvin de la Nieve; Spain; Abdülkadir Koçak; Turkey
Flyweight (– 51 kilograms)	Atagün Yalçınkaya; Turkey	Walid Cherif; Tunisia	Juan Padilla; Spain; Mohamed Eliwa; Egypt
Bantamweight (– 54 kilograms)	Ali Hallab; France	Mohamed Amiriek; Syria	Serdar Avcı; Turkey; Andrija Bogdanović; Serbia and Montenegro
Featherweight (– 57 kilograms)	Yaser Shigan; Syria	Ovidiu Bobîrnat; Cyprus	Aboubakr Seddik Lbida; Morocco; Yakup Kılıç; Turkey
Lightweight (– 60 kilograms)	Domenico Valentino; Italy	Selçuk Aydın; Turkey	Mohamed Beldjord; Algeria; Orestis Saridis; Greece
Light Welterweight (– 64 kilograms)	Adriani Vastine; France	Milan Piperski; Serbia and Montenegro	Önder Şipal; Turkey; José Guttierez; Spain
Welterweight (– 69 kilograms)	Bülent Ulusoy; Turkey	Xavier Noel; France	Choayb Oussaci; Algeria; Borna Katalinić; Croatia
Middleweight (– 75 kilograms)	Mohamed Hikal; Egypt	Savaş Kaya; Turkey	Nikola Sjekloća; Serbia and Montenegro; Mamadou Diambang; France
Light Heavyweight (– 81 kilograms)	Mourad Sahraoui; Tunisia	İhsan Yıldırım Tarhan; Turkey	Marijo Šivolija; Croatia; Robert Kramberger; Slovenia
Heavyweight (– 91 kilograms)	Clemente Russo; Italy	Mohamed Homrani; Tunisia	Vedran Đipalo; Croatia; Newfel Ouatah; France
Super Heavyweight (+ 91 kilograms)	Roberto Cammarelle; Italy	Mohamed Samoudi; France	Milan Vasiljević; Serbia and Montenegro; Bakr Shouman; Egypt

== Medal table ==
Place	Nation	1st place, gold medalist(s)	2nd place, silver medalist(s)	3rd place, bronze medalist(s)	Total
1	Italy	4	0	0	4
2	Turkey	2	3	4	9
3	France	2	2	2	6
4	Syria	1	2	0	3
4	Tunisia	1	2	0	3
6	Egypt	1	0	2	3
7	Serbia and Montenegro	0	1	3	4
8	Cyprus	0	1	0	1
9	Croatia	0	0	3	3
9	Spain	0	0	3	3
11	Algeria	0	0	2	2
12	Greece	0	0	1	1
12	Morocco	0	0	1	1
12	Slovenia	0	0	1	1
Total		11	11	22	44
