= Vedran Đipalo =

Croatian boxer

Personal information
- Born: 22 September 1977 (age 48)
Medal record
Men's Boxing
European Amateur Championships
Bronze medal – third place	2004 Pula	Heavyweight
EU Amateur Championships
Bronze medal – third place	2005 Cagliari	Heavyweight
Bronze medal – third place	2006 Pécs	Heavyweight
Bronze medal – third place	2007 Dublin	Heavyweight
Mediterranean Games
Bronze medal – third place	2005 Almeíra	Heavyweight

Vedran Đipalo (born 22 September 1977 in Sinj, Split-Dalmacija) is an Olympic boxer from Croatia best known for winning a bronze medal at the 2004 European Amateur Boxing Championships.

== Career ==
Đipalo won the bronze medal at 201 lbs at the 2004 European Amateur Boxing Championships in Pula, Croatia. At the 2004 World University Boxing Championships he also won Bronze.

He participated in the 2004 Summer Olympics for Croatia. He was beaten in the first round of the heavyweight (91 kg) division by Australia's Adam Forsyth.
