= Rachid El-Haddak =

Moroccan boxer

Personal information
- Nationality: Moroccan
- Born: 11 December 1973 (age 51)

Sport
- Sport: Boxing

Rachid El-Haddak (born 11 December 1973) is a Moroccan boxer. He competed in the men's heavyweight event at the 2004 Summer Olympics.
