= İhsan Emre Vural =

Turkish rower (born 1984)

Medal record
Men's rowing
Representing Turkey
Mediterranean Games
Bronze medal – third place	2005 Almería	Lwt coxless pair

Emre Vural (born in Ankara) is a Turkish national rower. He started his rowing career at the beginning of his high-school years at Robert College of Istanbul and competed in the lightweight coxless pair category. He got transferred to Galatasaray later in his career. He and his teammate Ahmet Yumrukaya became the first world-champions in the history of Turkey when they got first place in the 2004 Under 23 World Championships held in Poznań, Poland. In 2005, he and Ahmet Yumrukaya came back from the Mediterranean Games held in Almeria, Spain, with a bronze medal, again in the lightweight coxless pair category. Emre Vural studied at Columbia University in the United States. He rowed for various clubs in Turkey and also for the Columbia University rowing team. He graduated in 2008 with a B.A diploma in Economics.
