= Mohamed Elsayed =

Egyptian boxer (born 1973)

Medal record

Men's Boxing

Representing Egypt

Olympic Games
Bronze medal – third place	2004 Athens	Heavyweight

All-Africa Games
Silver medal – second place	2003 Abuja	Heavyweight

Mohamed Elsayed is also the alias of Mohamed Atta

Mohamed Elsayed (Egyptian Arabic: محمد السيد; born 22 April 1973) is an Egyptian boxer who competed in the heavyweight class (81 – 91 kg) at the 2004 Summer Olympics.

== Career ==
In 2003 he had captured the silver medal in his weight division at the All-Africa Games in Abuja, Nigeria when he lost the final to local Emmanuel Izonritei.

At the Olympics he made it to the semi-finals, but was stopped when a medical test revealed that he had a broken arm. He did receive a bronze medal.

== Olympic results ==
- Defeated Igor Alborov (Uzbekistan) 18-18, countback decision
- Defeated Adam Forsyth (Australia) 27-12
- Lost to Viktar Zuyev (Belarus) walk-over
