= Mourad Aliev =

French boxer (born 1995)

Personal information
- Nationality: French
- Born: July 31, 1995 (age 31) Moscow, Russia
- Height: 2.01 m (6 ft 7 in)
- Weight: Heavyweight

Boxing career
- Stance: Southpaw

Boxing record
- Total fights: 14
- Wins: 13
- Win by KO: 10
- Losses: 1
Medal record
Men's amateur boxing
Representing France
European Games
| Silver medal – second place | 2019 Minsk | Super-heavyweight |

Mourad Aliev (born 31 July 1995) is a French professional boxer. At regional level, he has challenged once for the European heavyweight title in 2025. As an amateur, he won a silver medal at the 2019 European Games. He also represented France at the 2020 Olympics.

== Early life ==
Aliev was born in Moscow, Russia, and is of Azerbaijani descent. His father, Ozer, was also an amateur boxer, representing the USSR. Aliev moved to France at the age of six as a political refugee and became a naturalised French citizen at the age of 22.

== Amateur career ==
At the 2020 Tokyo Olympics, Aliev was disqualified in his bout against Frazer Clarke due to a head-butt. As soon as the decision was announced in the ring, Aliev had denounced an injustice. Later, the supervisor certified an error in refereeing and said that there is no error on the part of Aliev, but the decision can not be modified. Aliev staged a sit-in protest for an hour, after punching the ringside camera. Both actual and former French National Olympic and Sports Committee presidents supported Aliev against what they consider being an injustice.

== Professional career ==
Aliev made his professional debut on 20 November 2021, scoring a four-round unanimous decision (UD) victory against German Skobenko at the Universum Gym in Hamburg, Germany.

On 7 June 2025, Mourad Aliev suffered his first loss as a professional boxer against Kosovan boxer Labinot Xhoxhaj at the Universum Gym in Hamburg, Germany. The bout was scored as a unanimous decision victory for Xhoxhaj, with the judges scoring the fight 115-113, 115-112, 114-113 in favour of Xhoxhaj.

== Professional boxing record ==
| 16 fights | 15 wins | 1 loss |
|---|---|---|
| By knockout | 11 | 0 |
| By decision | 4 | 1 |

| No. | Result | Record | Opponent | Type | Round, time | Date | Location | Notes |
|---|---|---|---|---|---|---|---|---|
| 16 | Win | 15–1 | Raphael Akpejiori | UD | 8 | 23 May 2026 | Oberhausen, Germany | Won vacant WBC International Silver heavyweight title |
| 15 | Win | 14–1 | Yonny Molina | RTD | 1 (8), 3:00 | 23 Nov 2025 | Olympic Park, Tirana, Albania | |
| 14 | Loss | 13–1 | Labinot Xhoxhaj | UD | 12 | 7 Jun 2025 | Universum Gym, Hamburg, Germany | Lost WBC International Silver heavyweight title; For European heavyweight title |
| 13 | Win | 13–0 | Davide Brito | TKO | 6 (10), 1:56 | 12 Dec 2024 | Grand Elysée, Hamburg, Germany | Retained WBC International Silver heavyweight title |
| 12 | Win | 12–0 | Luis Jose Marin Garcia | RTD | 2 (8), 3:00 | 7 Sep 2024 | Motorworld, Cologne, Germany | |
| 11 | Win | 11–0 | Dilan Prasovic | TKO | 3 (10), 2:43 | 11 May 2024 | Motorworld, Cologne, Germany | Retained WBC International Silver heavyweight title |
| 10 | Win | 10–0 | Awadh Tamim | TKO | 3 (8), 2:30 | 27 Jan 2024 | Motorworld, Cologne, Germany | |
| 9 | Win | 9–0 | Daso Simeunovic | TKO | 3 (8), 0:20 | 17 Dec 2023 | Universum Gym, Hamburg, Germany | |
| 8 | Win | 8–0 | Evgenios Lazaridis | UD | 10 | 30 Sep 2023 | Harzlandhalle, Ilsenburg, Germany | Retained WBC International Silver heavyweight title |
| 7 | Win | 7–0 | Ali Kiydin | TKO | 9 (10), 1:55 | 4 Feb 2023 | Friedrich-Ebert-Halle, Ludwigshafen, Germany | Won vacant WBC International Silver heavyweight title |
| 6 | Win | 6–0 | Yakup Saglam | TKO | 5 (10), 0:26 | 5 Nov 2022 | Rudolf Weber-Arena, Oberhausen, Germany | Won vacant WBC Mediterranean heavyweight title |
| 5 | Win | 5–0 | Dzemal Bosnjak | TKO | 6 (8), 2:42 | 24 Sep 2022 | No Limit Boxing, Leverkusen, Germany | |
| 4 | Win | 4–0 | Mirko Tintor | TKO | 2 (8), 2:12 | 14 May 2022 | BJK Akatlar Arena, Istanbul, Turkey | |
| 3 | Win | 3–0 | Milos Veletic | UD | 6 | 19 Mar 2022 | Tempodrom, Berlin, Germany | |
| 2 | Win | 2–0 | Dorde Tomic | TKO | 2 (6), 0:40 | 19 Feb 2022 | Universum Gym, Hamburg, Germany | |
| 1 | Win | 1–0 | German Skobenko | UD | 4 | 20 Nov 2021 | Universum Gym, Hamburg, Germany | |

Sporting positions
Regional boxing titles
| Vacant Title last held by Emir Ahmatovic | WBC Mediterranean heavyweight champion 5 November 2022 – April 2025; Vacated | Vacant Title next held by Angelo Morejon |
| Vacant Title last held by José Larduet | WBC International Silver heavyweight champion 4 February 2023 – 7 June 2025 | Succeeded by Labinot Xhoxhaj |
| Vacant Title last held by Labinot Xhoxhaj | WBC International Silver heavyweight champion 23 May 2026 – present | Incumbent |
