= Adam Forsyth =

Australian boxer

Adam Forsyth (born 31 March 1981 in Kawerau, New Zealand) is an Australian amateur boxer who competed at the 2004 Summer Olympics in the men's heavyweight division. He was an Australian Institute of Sport scholarship holder.

At 2004 Athens Olympics he beat Vedran Đipalo but lost highly controversially to Mohamed Elsayed. He has a national rival in Bradley Michael Pitt who edged him out in the 2008 Olympic qualifier.

In 2019, Forsyth was arrested for importing $84 million worth of methamphetamine into New Zealand from Australia. He was sentenced to twelve years and five months in prison. He received a lenient sentence due to evidence that he suffered from a neurological disorder caused by brain trauma he sustained in an assault two years prior.
