= Abdülkadir Koçak =

Turkish boxer (born 1981)

Personal information
- Born: 1 January 1981 (age 45)
Medal record
Men's Boxing
Representing Turkey
Mediterranean Games
Gold medal – first place	2001 Tunis	Light Flyweight
Bronze medal – third place	2005 Almeíra	Light Flyweight
EU Amateur Championships
Gold medal – first place	2003 Strasbourg	Light Flyweight
World University Championships
Bronze medal – third place	2004 Antalya	Welterweight

Abdulkadir Koçak (born 1 January 1981) is a Turkish national boxer competing in the light flyweight (48 kg) division. Koçak boxed for Beşiktaş J.K. before transferring to Tekelspor club in Istanbul.

Kocak won gold medal at the inaugural European Union Boxing Championship held 2003 in Strasbourg, France. He was named "Best Boxer" amongst the 91 boxers from 17 different countries who took part at the championship. He fought a bronze medal at the 2004 World University Boxing Championship in Antalya, Turkey. Koçak won bronze medal in his weight class at the 2005 Mediterranean Games in Almería, Spain.
