= Emmanuel Izonritei =

Nigerian boxer (born 1978)

Medal record

Representing Nigeria

Men's Boxing

All-Africa Games
Gold medal – first place	2003 Abuja	Heavyweight

Emmanuel Weingkro Izonritei (Izon-Eritei) (born 31 October 1978) is a boxer from Bayelsa State of Nigeria.

== Career ==
Boxer at the 2003 Afro-Asian Games India (Gold Medallist). He was an athlete in the 2004 Summer Olympics for Nigeria, where he lost in the round of 16 (Heavyweight (91 kg) division) to Naser Al Shami of Syria, who eventually won the bronze. In 2003, he won gold against Mohamed Elsayed in the All-Africa Games in Abuja, Nigeria.

His brother David won a silver model in boxing in the 1992 Summer Olympics.

Served in the Nigeria Airforce 1999 - 2005, also Served in the British Army 2008 -2013, He did a tour of Afghanistan "OP Herrick 10" 2009.
