= Ahmet Yumrukaya =

Turkish rower (born 1984)

Personal information
- Born: 25 May 1984 (age 42) Istanbul, Turkey
Medal record
Men's Rowing
Representing Turkey
World Championships
| Bronze medal – third place | 2014 Amsterdam | LM8+ |
Mediterranean Games
| Bronze medal – third place | 2005 Almería | Light Coxless Pairs |

Ahmet Yumrukaya (born 25 May 1984) is a Turkish rower competing in the lightweight coxless pair category.

He is one of the first two Turkish rowers to win a world championship title in history. Yumrukaya and his teammate İhsan Emre Vural took first place in the lightweight men's coxless pair event in the 2004 Under 23 World Championships held in Poznań, Poland.

He participated in the 2005 Mediterranean Games in Almería, Spain and won bronze medal with his teammate İhsan Emre Vural.
