= Daniel Betti =

Italian boxer

Personal information
- Nationality: Italian
- Born: 19 May 1978 (age 47) Foligno, Italy

Sport
- Sport: Boxing

Daniel Betti (born 19 May 1978) is an Italian former boxer. He competed in the men's heavyweight event at the 2004 Summer Olympics.
