= Derya Bard Sarıaltın =

Turkish archer (born 1977)

Personal information
- Nationality: Turkish
- Born: Svana Bard; May 14, 1977 (age 49) Ukraine
- Height: 1.80 m (5.9 ft)
- Weight: 80 kg (180 lb)

Sport
- Country: Turkey
- Sport: Archery
Medal record
Women's Archery
World Cup & Grand Prix
Gold medal – first place	2006 San Salvador	Team
Mediterranean Games
Bronze medal – third place	2005 Almería, Spain	Individual
Silver medal – second place	2005 Almería, Spain	Team

Derya Bard Sarıaltın (born May 14, 1977), formerly Svana Bard, is a Turkish archer of Ukrainian origin.

She participated at the 2005 Mediterranean Games in Almería, Spain and won bronze medal in women’s individual category and silver medal with the Turkish team. At the World Cup & Grand Prix held on June 20–25, 2006 in San Salvador, El Salvador, she became gold medalist with her Turkish national team.
