= Serdar Avcı =

Turkish boxer (born 1985)

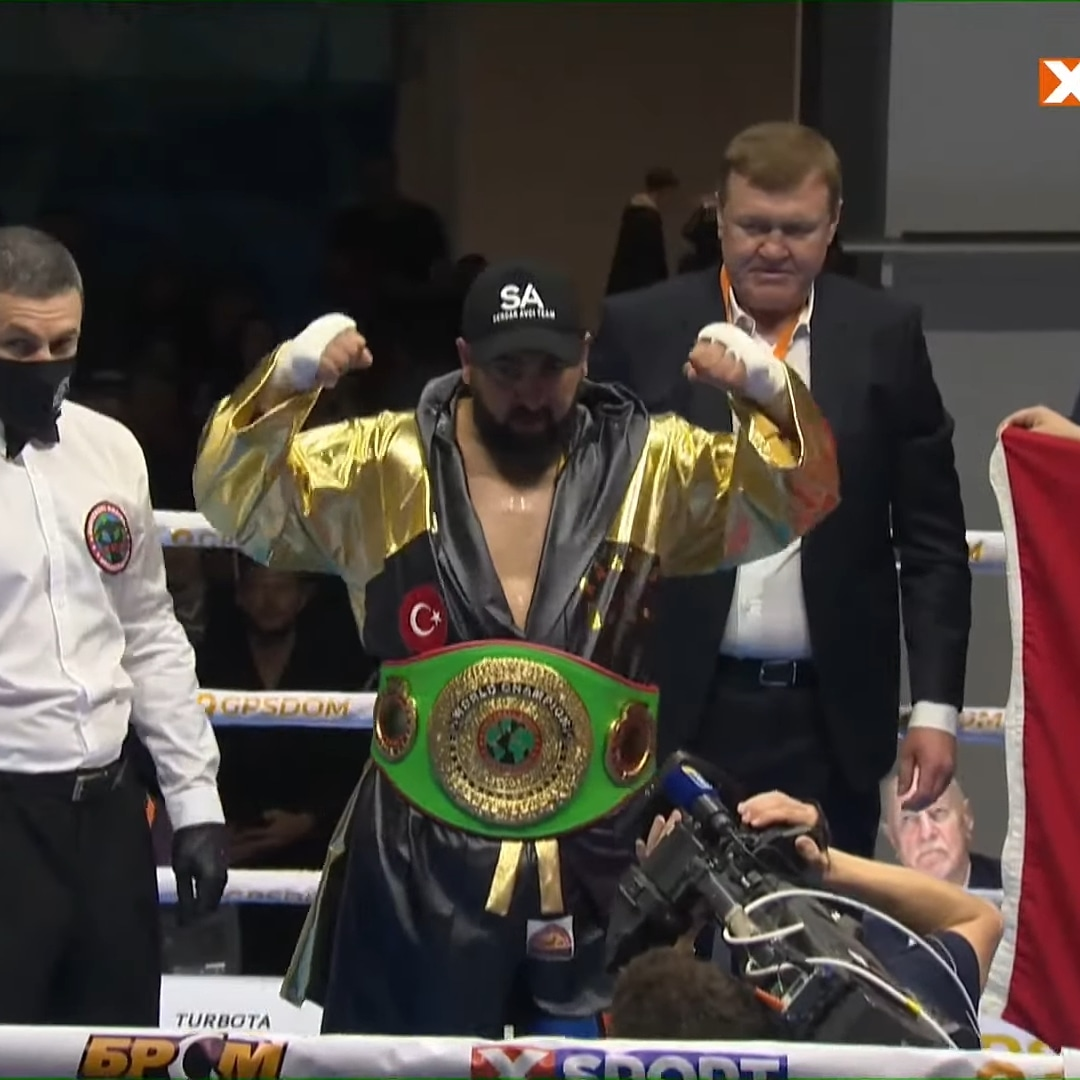
- Serdar Avci UBO World Heavyweight Championship

Personal information
- Nationality: Turkish
- Born: 1 July 1985 (age 41) Kadıköy, Istanbul, Turkey
- Website: serdaravci.com.tr

Boxing career

Boxing record
- Total fights: 16
- Wins: 15
- Win by KO: 14
Medal record
Men's Boxing
Representing Turkey
Mediterranean Games
Bronze medal – third place	2005 Almeíra	Bantamweight

Serdar Avcı (born 1 July 1985) is a Turkish boxer, who competed as amateur in the bantamweight (54 kg) and as professional in the heavyweight disciplines. He started boxing at Istanbul Fenerbahçe Boxing Club in his hometown.

== Early years and amateur career ==
Avcı started his boxing career at the age of seven entering Fenerbahçe Boxing. As an amateur boxer, he won several titles at regional and nationwide championships.

In 2004, he won a bronze medal in the Bantamweight division at the 4th AIBA European 2004 Olympic Qualifying Tournament in Baku, Azerbaijan.

He won a bronze medal in the Bantamweight (−54 kg) division at the 2005 Mediterranean Games in Almeria, Spain.

== Professional career ==
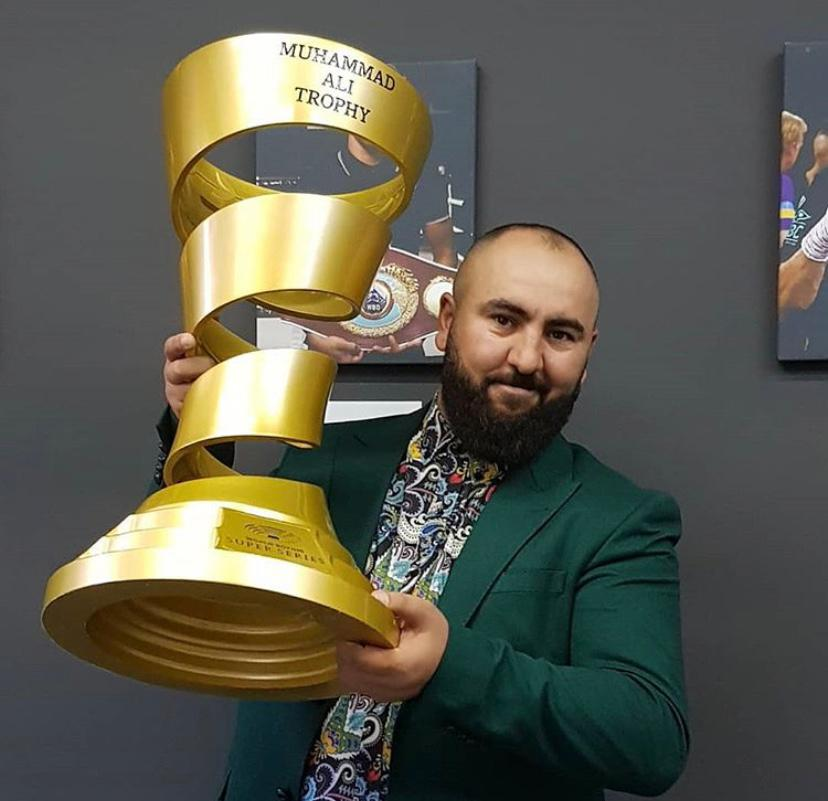
Serdar Avcı holding the "Muhammad Ali Trophy" in 2020.

After a long break, Avcı returned to the boxing rings as a professional boxer of "Kadıköy Boxing Club" in his hometown. He debuted in a WBC match against the Georgian Davit Gorgiladze in Kyiv, Ukraine on 27 July 2019, and won by RTD.

He won his next two fights the same year against the Georgians, Soso Abuladze by Technical knockout (TKO), and Archil Gigolashvili by knockout (KO).

In 2020, Avcı fought six matches winning five by TKO and one by KO. He met Sezer Olpak from Turkey, Vadym Shyika from Ukraine, Mario Plaku from Albania, Serdar Hemrayev, Guvanch Kurbanov, and Rozymurat Chariyev from Turkmenistan.

He won the world champion title in the Intercontinental Light heavyweight division of the Universal Boxing Organization (UBO) in Kyiv in May 2021. He took the Golden Belt by knocking out Georgian Zaal Kvezereli in the second round. His next fight in 2021 against Taryel Jafarov from Azerbaijan ended with a TKO win for Avcı. In December the same year, he defeated British Danny Williams, who had knocked down Mike Tyson, in Ukraine. He then won the WBC Silver Asian Belt in Heavyweight division after knocking out Indian Kuldeep Singh. In October 2022, Avcı captured the WBC Silver Belt defeating WBC Africa champion Tony Salam from Nigeria in Istanbul, Turkey after his opponent was injured on his shoulder.

His last fight was against Anar Humbatov from Azerbaijan in September 2023 that ended by TKO for Avcı.

As of end 2023, he had boxed 24 rounds in 15 bouts, of which he won 14 matches byKO or TKO. He ranks second among 20 Turkish boxers in his wieight class, and number 41 of 1,313 in the world.

Avcı is working as a coach atKadıköy Boxing Club and Fenerbahçe Boxing in Istanbul.
