= Wilmer Vásquez =

Venezuelan boxer

Wilmer José Vásquez Torres (born August 30, 1981) is a Venezuelan heavyweight boxer best known for having participated in the 2004 Olympic tournament. He qualified for the Olympic Games by ending up in first place at the 2nd AIBA American 2004 Olympic Qualifying Tournament in Rio de Janeiro, Brazil.

== Amateur ==
Aggressive left hooker Vasquez had a distinct puncher reputation as an amateur at heavyweights with 201 lbs limit. In the Olympic qualifiers he KOd Rafael Lima and Gerardo Bisbal and outpointed Canada's 2002 Commonwealth Champion Jason Douglas. At the Olympics he beat Ertugrul Ergezen by disqualification, but ran into top favorite and eventual winner Odlanier Solis and was soundly outpointed.

== Pro ==
He turned pro in Florida for DRL ( Dan Wise, Roberto Durán and Luis DeCubas) and is managed by Luis DeCubas Jr. In his first 6 fights he was woefully out of shape weighing in as high as 290 lbs and only scored 4 KOs.
