= Ertuğrul Ergezen =

Turkish boxer

Medal record

Men's boxing

Representing Turkey

European Amateur Championships
Bronze medal – third place	2004 Pula	Heavyweight

Ertuğrul Ergezen (20 July 1978 – 15 March 2024), born in Posot, Turkey, was a boxer who debuted on 8 August 2000. Although Ergezen representated Turkey, he lived in Hamburg, Germany.

He was disqualified in the 2004 Summer Olympics against Wilmer Vasquez in the first round of the Heavyweight (91 kg) division. Ergezen won the bronze medal in the same division six months earlier at the 2004 European Amateur Boxing Championships in Pula, Croatia. Ergezen won four fights in 2005 then retired.
