= Gurgen Hovhannisyan =

Armenian boxer

Personal information
- Nationality: Armenian
- Born: 19 February 1998 (age 28) Yerevan, Armenia
- Height: 6 ft 7 in (201 cm)
- Weight: Heavyweight

Boxing career
- Stance: Orthodox

Boxing record
- Total fights: 10
- Wins: 10
- Win by KO: 9

Gurgen Hovhannisyan (born February 19, 1998) is an Armenian professional boxer.

== Professional career ==
Hovhannisyan made his debut in Bakersfield, California on September 18, 2021. He is trained by legendary trainer Joe Goosen. Hovhannisyan was scheduled to face former world champion Charles Martin but had to pull out through injury.

== Professional boxing record ==
10 fights	10 wins	0 losses
By knockout	9	0
By decision	1	0

No.	Result	Record	Opponent	Type	Round, time	Date	Location	Notes
10	Win	10–0	Cesar Navarro	TKO	5 (10), 2:45	28 Mar 2026	MGM Grand Garden Arena, Paradise, Nevada, U.S.	
9	Win	9–0	Chris Thomas	TKO	3 (10), 1:19	18 Jul 2025	Caribe Royale Orlando, Orlando, Florida, U.S.	
8	Win	8–0	Dajuan Calloway	KO	5 (8), 1:33	18 Apr 2025	Caribe Royale Orlando, Orlando, Florida, U.S.	
7	Win	7–0	Patrick Mailata	MD	8	13 Dec 2024	Caribe Royale Orlando, Orlando, Florida, U.S.	
6	Win	6–0	Luis Pascual	RTD	5 (10), 3:00	31 May 2024	Caribe Royale Orlando, Orlando, Florida, U.S.	
5	Win	5–0	Colby Madison	KO	5 (10), 0:40	4 Jan 2024	Emerald Park Casino, Tacoma, Washington, U.S.	
4	Win	4–0	Michael Polite Coffie	RTD	6 (8), 3:00	15 Oct 2022	Barclays Center, New York City, New York, U.S.	
3	Win	3–0	Jesse Bryan	KO	2 (6), 2:45	14 May 2022	Dignity Health Sports Park, Carson, California, U.S.	
2	Win	2–0	Nick Jones	KO	2 (6), 2:45	11 Dec 2021	Dignity Health Sports Park, Carson, California, U.S.	
1	Win	1–0	Jayvone Dafney	KO	1 (4), 2:10	18 Sep 2021	Mechanics Bank Arena, Bakersfield, California, U.S.	
