= Boxing at the 2008 Summer Olympics – Featherweight =

Boxing competitions

Men's featherweight at the Games of the XXIX Olympiad
- Venue: Workers Indoor Arena
- Date: 11–23 August 2008
- Competitors: 28 from 28 nations

Medalists
1st place, gold medalist(s)		Vasiliy Lomachenko	Ukraine
2nd place, silver medalist(s)		Khedafi Djelkhir	France
3rd place, bronze medalist(s)		Yakup Kılıç	Turkey
3rd place, bronze medalist(s)		Shahin Imranov	Azerbaijan

The featherweight competition was the fourth-lowest weight class featured in amateur boxing at the 2008 Summer Olympics, and was held at the Workers Indoor Arena. Featherweights were limited to a maximum of 57 kilograms in body mass.

== Competition format ==
Like all Olympic boxing events, the competition was a straight single-elimination tournament. Both semifinal losers were awarded bronze medals, so no boxers competed again after their first loss. Bouts consisted of four rounds of two minutes each, with one-minute breaks between rounds. Punches scored only if the white area on the front of the glove made full contact with the front of the head or torso of the opponent. Five judges scored each bout; three of the judges had to signal a scoring punch within one second for the punch to score. The winner of the bout was the boxer who scored the most valid punches by the end of the bout.

== Schedule ==
All times are China Standard Time (UTC+8)

Date	Time	Round
Monday 11 August 2008	13:30 & 19:00	Round of 32
Friday 15 August 2008	13:30 & 21:00	Round of 16
Monday 18 August 2008	20:00	Quarter-finals
Friday 22 August 2008	14:00	Semi-finals
Saturday 23 August 2008	19:35	Final

== Draw ==
All times are China Standard Time (UTC+8)

Round of 32; Monday, August 11, 2008; 13:30-15:00 & 19:00-20:30
Robson Conceiçao (BRA)	4
Li Yang (CHN)	12
Roberto Navarro (DOM)	3
Luis Porozo (ECU)	+3
Anthresh Lalit Lakra (IND)	5
Bahodirjon Sultonov (UZB)	9
Vasyl Lomachenko (UKR)	14
Albert Selimov (RUS)	7
Raynell Williams (USA)	9
Alessio di Savino (ITA)	1
Paul Fleming (AUS)	9
Khedafi Djelkhir (FRA)	13
Nick Okoth (KEN)	2
Arturo Santos Reyes (MEX)	6
Alaa Shili (TUN)	14
Wilhelm Gratschow (GER)	5
Prince Octopus (GHA)	2
Idel Torriente (CUB)	11
Zorigtbaataryn Enkhzorig (MGL)	10
Mahdi Ouatine (MAR)	1
Thato Batshegi (BOT)	4
Nikoloz Izoria (GEO)	14
Galib Jafarov (KAZ)	5
Shahin Imranov (AZE)	9

Round of 16; Friday, August 15, 2008; 13:30-14:30 & 21:00-22:00
Yakup Kılıç (TUR)	12
Satoshi Shimizu (JPN)	9
Sailom Adi (THA)	6
Abdelkader Chadi (ALG)	7
Li Yang (CHN)	6
Luis Porozo (ECU)	5
Bahodirjon Sultonov (UZB)	1
Vasyl Lomachenko (UKR)	13
Raynell Williams (USA)	7
Khedafi Djelkhir (FRA)	9
Arturo Santos Reyes (MEX)	14
Alaa Shili (TUN)	2
Idel Torriente (CUB)	10
Zorigtbaataryn Enkhzorig (MGL)	9
Nikoloz Izoria (GEO)	9
Shahin Imranov (AZE)	18

Quarterfinals; Monday, August 18, 2008; 20:00-21:00
Yakup Kılıç (TUR)	13
Abdelkader Chadi (ALG)	6
Li Yang (CHN)	3
Vasyl Lomachenko (UKR)	12
Khedafi Djelkhir (FRA)	14
Arturo Santos Reyes (MEX)	9
Idel Torriente (CUB)	14
Shahin Imranov (AZE)	16

Semifinals; Friday, August 22, 2008; 14:00-14:30
Yakup Kılıç (TUR)	1
Vasyl Lomachenko (UKR)	10
Khedafi Djelkhir (FRA)
Shahin Imranov (AZE)	RET

Final; Saturday, August 23, 2008; 19:35-19:55
Vasyl Lomachenko (UKR)	RSC
Khedafi Djelkhir (FRA)

== See also ==
- 2009 World Amateur Boxing Championships – Featherweight
