= 2009 World Amateur Boxing Championships – Featherweight =

Boxing competitions

The Featherweight competition was the fourth-lowest weight featured at the 2009 World Amateur Boxing Championships, and was held at the Mediolanum Forum. Featherweights were limited to a maximum of 57 kilograms in body mass.

== Medalists ==
| Gold | Vasyl Lomachenko; Ukraine |
| Silver | Sergey Vodopyanov; Russia |
| Bronze | Oscar Valdez; Mexico |
| Bronze | Bahodirjon Sooltonov; Uzbekistan |

== Seeds ==
1. (Ukraine) Vasyl Lomachenko (champion)
2. (Uzbekistan) Bahodirjon Sooltonov (semifinals)
3. (Ecuador) Luis Enrique Porozo (third round)
4. (Mexico) Oscar Valdez (semifinals)
5. (China) Li Yang (second round)
6. (Japan) Satoshi Shimizu (first round)
7. (India) Akhil Kumar (first round)
8. (Russia) Sergey Vodopyanov (final)

== Draw ==
=== Finals ===
Quarterfinals
Vasyl Lomachenko (UKR) | 8
Branimir Stankovic (SRB) | 2
Azat Hovhannisyan (ARM) | 9
Oscar Valdez (MEX) | 14
Yasniel Toledo (CUB) | 4
Sergey Vodopyanov (RUS) | 10
Kerem Gürgen (TUR) | 2
Bahodirjon Sooltonov (UZB) | 12

Semifinals
Vasyl Lomachenko (UKR) | 12
Oscar Valdez (MEX) | 1
Sergey Vodopyanov (RUS) | 7
Bahodirjon Sooltonov (UZB) | 5

Final
Vasyl Lomachenko (UKR) | 12
Sergey Vodopyanov (RUS) | 1

=== Top Half ===
==== Section 1 ====
Round 1
Roberto Navarro (DOM) | 16
Akhil Kumar (IND) | 2

Round 2
Vasyl Lomachenko (UKR) | 16
Mario Aleksic (BIH) | 2
Craig Evans (WAL) | 14
Mohamed Eliwa (EGY) | 7
Branimir Stanković (SRB) | 8
Irodioni Onashvili (GEO) | 1
Oreste Molina (ESP)
Roberto Navarro (DOM) | RSCI

Round 3
Vasyl Lomachenko (UKR) | 15
Craig Evans (WAL) | 1
Branimir Stanković (SRB) | 8
Roberto Navarro (DOM) | 2

Quarterfinals
Vasyl Lomachenko (UKR) | 8
Branimir Stanković (SRB) | 2

==== Section 2 ====
Round 1
Li Yang (CHN) | 13
Javkhlan Bariadii (MGL) | 1
Alessio di Savino (ITA) | 16
Jehad Alzubi (JOR) | 3
Gytis Vaitkus (LTU) | 11
Hicham Ziouti (FRA) | 9
Azat Hovhannisyan (ARM) | 24
Héctor Manzanilla (VEN) | 7
Joo Min Jae (KOR) | 9
Vladimir Nikiforov (EST) | 2
Charly Suarez (PHI) | 18
Iulian Stan (ROU) | 8
Wuttichai Masuk (THA) | 3
David Joyce (IRL) | 28
Clive Atwell (GUI) | 3
Oscar Valdez (MEX) | 14

Round 2
Li Yang (CHN) | 4
Alessio di Savino (ITA) | 13
Gytis Vaitkus (LTU) | 3
Azat Hovhannisyan (ARM) | 12
Joo Min Jae (KOR) | 11
Charly Suarez (PHI) | 5
David Joyce (IRL) | 11
Oscar Valdez (MEX) | 16

Round 3
Alessio di Savino (ITA) | 7
Azat Hovhannisyan (ARM) | 14
Joo Min Jae (KOR) | 6
Oscar Valdez (MEX) | 9

Quarterfinals
Azat Hovhannisyan (ARM) | 9
Oscar Valdez (MEX) | 14

=== Bottom Half ===
==== Section 3 ====
Round 1
Luis Enrique Porozo (ECU) | +5
Ilkin Aghayev (AZE) | 5
Sibomana Niyitegeka (RWA) | 3
Ignacio Perrin (ARG) | 10
Sandro Schaer (GER) | 11
Mehrullah Lassi (PAK) | 1
Robson Conceiçao (BRA) | 7
Yasniel Toledo (CUB) | 21
Ibrahim Balla (AUS) | 19
Kevin Rivers (USA) | 22
Bashir Hassan (SWE) | 9
Askarbek Kalpakov (KGZ) | 6
Yerzhan Mussafirov (KAZ) | RSC
Vatea Bossuet (PYF)
Amangeldi Hudaybergenov (TKM) | 5
Sergey Vodopyanov (RUS) | 21

Round 2
Luis Enrique Porozo (ECU) | 11
Ignacio Perrin (ARG) | 5
Sandro Schaer (GER) | 5
Yasniel Toledo (CUB) | 14
Kevin Rivers (USA) | 9
Bashir Hassan (SWE) | 5
Yerzhan Mussafirov (KAZ) | 4
Sergey Vodopyanov (RUS) | 22

Round 3
Luis Enrique Porozo (ECU) | 3
Yasniel Toledo (CUB) | 11
Kevin Rivers (USA) | 1
Sergey Vodopyanov (RUS) | 13

Quarterfinals
Yasniel Toledo (CUB) | 4
Sergey Vodopyanov (RUS) | 10

==== Section 4 ====
Round 1
Satoshi Shimizu (JPN)
Nick Okoth (KEN) | WO
Jean Colin (MRI) | 1
Kerem Gürgen (TUR) | 21
Shafick Chitou (BEN) | 7
Shahzada Hassan (AFG) | 2
Papish Baloyi (RSA) | 23
Mohammed Shahmeem (FIJ) | 1
Mikhail Biarnadski (BLR) | 5
Michak Chudecki (POL) | 12
Mohamed Ouadahi (ALG) | 10
Tomas Vano (SVK) | 5
Mmoloki Nogeng (BOT)
Janos Mihaly (HUN) | RSC
Dennis Ceylan (DEN)
Bahodirjon Sooltonov (UZB) | RSC

Round 2
Nick Okoth (KEN) | 0
Kerem Gürgen (TUR) | 11
Shafick Chitou (BEN) | 13
Papish Baloyi (RSA) | 3
Michak Chudecki (POL) | 11
Mohamed Ouadahi (ALG) | 8
Janos Mihaly (HUN) | 3
Bahodirjon Sooltonov (UZB) | 18

Round 3
Kerem Gürgen (TUR) | 4
Shafick Chitou (BEN) | 2
Michak Chudecki (POL) | 6
Bahodirjon Sooltonov (UZB) | 15

Quarterfinals
Kerem Gürgen (TUR) | 2
Bahodirjon Sooltonov (UZB) | 12

== See also ==
- Boxing at the 2008 Summer Olympics – Featherweight
