= Daulis Prescott =

Colombian boxer (born 1986)

Personal information
- Nationality: Colombian
- Born: Daulis Prescott Consuegra; 2 September 1986 (age 39) Barranquilla, Atlántico, Colombia
- Height: 5 ft 9 in (175 cm)
- Weight: Featherweight; Super featherweight

Boxing career
- Reach: 70 in (178 cm)
- Stance: Orthodox

Boxing record
- Total fights: 50
- Wins: 32
- Win by KO: 24
- Losses: 15
- No contests: 3

Daulis Prescott Consuegra (born 2 September 1986) is a Colombian professional boxer who has challenged once for the WBA featherweight title in 2012. His older brother Breidis Prescott is also a professional boxer.

== Professional career ==
Prescott made his professional debut on 24 November 2006, stopping Armando Velasquez in the second round. On 8 December 2012, Prescott faced Nicholas Walters for the vacant WBA featherweight title. Scoring three knockdowns, Walters stopped Prescott in seven rounds.

== Professional boxing record ==
43 fights	33 wins	7 losses
By knockout	25	6
By decision	8	1
No contests	3	

No.	Result	Record	Opponent	Type	Round, time	Date	Location	Notes
42	Win	32–7 (3)	Marcial Medrano	KO	2 (6), 2:10	6 Apr 2018	Plaza Central, Puerto Colombia, Colombia	
41	Loss	31–7 (3)	Subriel Matias	TKO	3 (10), 0:23	17 Feb 2018	Coliseo Ecuestre Municipal, Fajardo, Puerto Rico	
40	Loss	31–6 (3)	Aidar Sharibayev	TKO	1 (8), 2:54	3 Nov 2017	Osceola Heritage Center, Kissimmee, Florida, US	
39	Loss	31–5 (3)	Erick De Leon	TKO	3 (8), 0:59	28 Apr 2017	Marriott Convention Center, Burbank, California, US	
38	Loss	31–4 (3)	Saul Rodriguez	KO	7 (10), 2:37	14 May 2016	Sportsmen's Lodge, Los Angeles, California, US	
37	Win	31–3 (3)	Yohangel Romero	KO	3 (6), 2:59	11 Mar 2016	Restaurante Crisby, Barranquilla, Colombia	
36	Loss	30–3 (3)	Tevin Farmer	KO	8 (10), 0:52	8 Aug 2015	Fantasy Springs Resort Casino, Indio, California, US	
35	Win	30–2 (3)	Yohangel Romero	KO	4 (6), 2:56	18 Jul 2015	Coliseo Elias Chegwin, Barranquilla, Colombia	
34	Win	29–2 (3)	John Merchan	TKO	2 (6), 1:03	27 Mar 2015	Las Vegas Recreaciones, Barranquilla, Colombia	
33	Win	28–2 (3)	Elkin Zavaleta	TKO	4 (6), 2:57	29 Jan 2015	Las Vegas Recreaciones, Barranquilla, Colombia	
32	Win	27–2 (3)	Eduardo Pacheco	SD	8	17 Nov 2014	Estudios de Telecaribe, Barranquilla, Colombia	
31	Loss	26–2 (3)	Nicholas Walters	TKO	7 (12), 0:35	8 Dec 2012	National Indoor Centre, Kingston, Jamaica	For vacant WBA featherweight title
30	Win	26–1 (3)	Juan Ruiz	UD	6	24 Aug 2012	Omega Products International, Corona, California, US	
29	Win	25–1 (3)	Jose Angel Cota	TKO	3 (6), 2:04	20 Jul 2012	DoubleTree, Ontario, California, US	
28	Win	24–1 (3)	Walberto Zuniga	KO	2 (8), 1:45	31 Mar 2012	Villa Olimpica, Galapa, Colombia	
27	Loss	23–1 (3)	Gabriel Tolmajyan	SD	8	2 Dec 2011	Chumash Casino Resort, Santa Ynez, California, US	
26	NC	23–0 (3)	Elkin Zavaleta	NC	3 (8)	27 Jul 2011	Las Vegas Recreaciones, Barranquilla, Colombia	
25	Win	23–0 (2)	Wegner Ortega	KO	5 (10)	30 Apr 2011	Coliseo Cubierto, Puerto Colombia, Colombia	
24	Win	22–0 (2)	Jose Carmona	UD	10	30 Oct 2010	Centro de Convenciones, Cartagena, Colombia	
23	Win	21–0 (2)	Elkin Garces	KO	3 (8)	5 Mar 2010	Estadio de Softbol, Puerto Colombia, Colombia	
22	Win	20–0 (2)	Eduardo Pacheco	KO	1 (8), 2:45	23 Oct 2009	Hotel Pradomar, Puerto Colombia, Colombia	
21	Win	19–0 (2)	Alexander Monterrosa	UD	8	19 Jun 2009	Las Vegas Recreaciones, Barranquilla, Colombia	
20	Win	18–0 (2)	Emerson Nisperusa	KO	2 (6)	29 May 2009	Las Vegas Recreaciones, Barranquilla, Colombia	
19	NC	17–0 (2)	Jesus Lora	NC	2 (8)	15 May 2009	Hotel Pradomar, Puerto Colombia, Colombia	NC after an accidental head clash
18	NC	17–0 (1)	Victor Peralta	NC	1 (6)	20 Mar 2009	Las Vegas Recreaciones, Barranquilla, Colombia	NC after an accidental head clash
17	Win	17–0	Eduardo Pacheco	KO	5 (10), 2:48	5 Dec 2008	Coliseo Julio Monsalvo Castilla, Valledupar, Colombia	
16	Win	16–0	Victor Peralta	KO	1 (8)	27 Sep 2008	Coliseo Julio Monsalvo Castilla, Valledupar, Colombia	
15	Win	15–0	Edinson Jimenez	PTS	6	29 Mar 2008	Coliseo Julio Monsalvo Castilla, Valledupar, Colombia	
14	Win	14–0	Diego Martinez	KO	6	22 Dec 2007	Coliseo Julio Monsalvo Castilla, Valledupar, Colombia	
13	Win	13–0	Diego Martinez	KO	1 (6), 2:35	30 Nov 2007	Coliseo Elias Chegwin, Barranquilla, Colombia	
12	Win	12–0	Teo Cespedes	TKO	2 (6)	16 Nov 2007	Las Vegas Recreaciones, Barranquilla, Colombia	
11	Win	11–0	John Cassiani	KO	2 (6)	29 Sep 2007	Coliseo Julio Monsalvo Castilla, Valledupar, Colombia	
10	Win	10–0	Miguel Pacheco	KO	1 (6)	1 Sep 2007	Salon Jumbo del Country Club, Barranquilla, Colombia	
9	Win	9–0	Dioberto Julio	SD	8	19 Jul 2007	Elias Chegwin Colisseum, Barranquilla, Colombia	
8	Win	8–0	Sebastian Cardona	TKO	3 (4)	29 Jun 2007	Las Vegas Recreaciones, Barranquilla, Colombia	
7	Win	7–0	Orlen Padilla	UD	6	28 Apr 2007	Coliseo Universidad del Norte, Barranquilla, Colombia	
6	Win	6–0	Edinson Jimenez	PTS	4	16 Mar 2007	Las Vegas Recreaciones, Barranquilla, Colombia	
5	Win	5–0	Luis Sevillano	TKO	1 (4)	2 Mar 2007	Estadio Romelio Martinez, Barranquilla, Colombia	
4	Win	4–0	Orlando Perez	KO	3 (4)	3 Feb 2007	Gimnasio Chico de Hierro, Cartagena, Colombia	
3	Win	3–0	Rafael Castillo	KO	4 (4)	27 Jan 2007	Centro de Cultura Física, Barranquilla, Colombia	
2	Win	2–0	Juan Martinez	KO	1 (4)	15 Dec 2006	Coliseo Municipal, Valledupar, Colombia	
1	Win	1–0	Armando Velasquez	TKO	2 (4)	24 Nov 2006	Las Vegas Recreaciones, Barranquilla, Colombia	
