= Óscar Valdez =

Mexican boxer (born 1990)

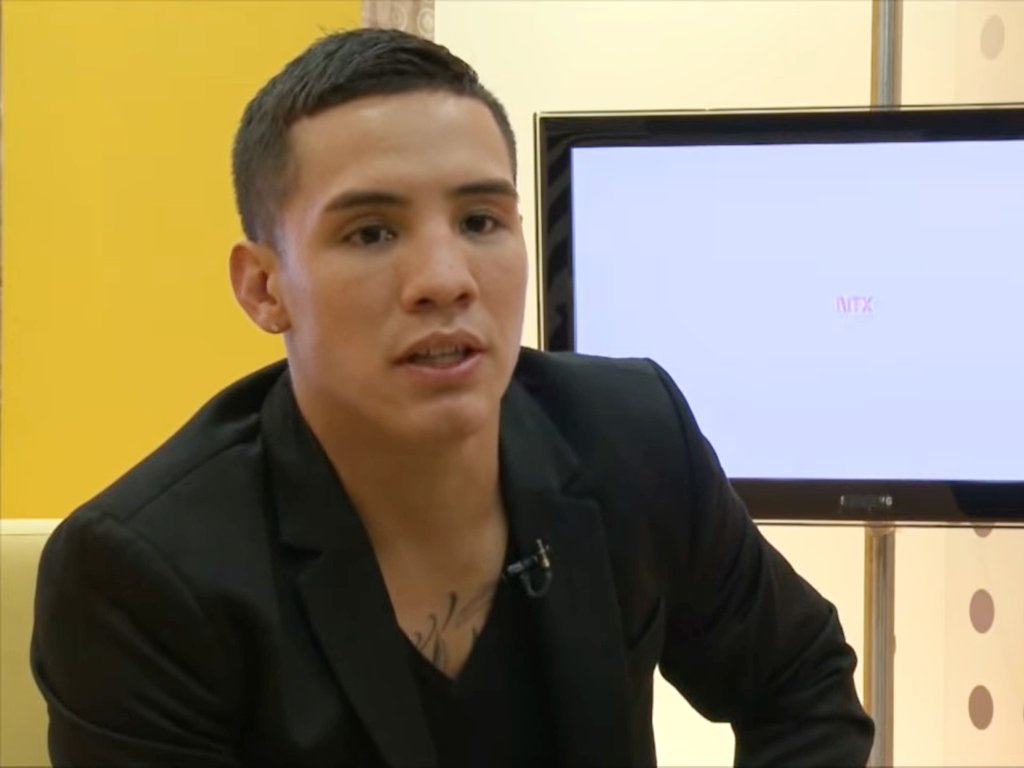
- Valdez in 2016

Personal information
- Born: Óscar Rafael Valdez Fierro Jr. 22 December 1990 (age 35) Nogales, Sonora, Mexico
- Height: 5 ft 5 1/2 in (166 cm)
- Weight: Featherweight; Super featherweight

Boxing career
- Reach: 66 in (168 cm)
- Stance: Orthodox

Boxing record
- Total fights: 36
- Wins: 33
- Win by KO: 24
- Losses: 3
Medal record
Men's Boxing
Representing Mexico
World Amateur Championships
Bronze medal – third place	2009 Milan	Featherweight
Pan American Games
Silver medal – second place	2011 Guadalajara	Bantamweight
AIBA Youth World Boxing Championships
Gold medal – first place	2008 Guadalajara	Featherweight
Central American and Caribbean Games
Gold medal – first place	2010 Mayagüez	Featherweight

Óscar Rafael Valdez Fierro Jr. (born 22 December 1990) is a Mexican professional boxer. He is a former world champion in two weight classes, having held the World Boxing Organization (WBO) featherweight title from 2016 to 2019, and the World Boxing Council (WBC) super featherweight title from 2021 to 2022. As an amateur boxer, Valdez qualified for the 2008 Olympics at the age of 17 and became the first Mexican Youth World Champion. Four years later, he qualified for the 2012 Summer Olympics.

Valdez is known for his aggressive fighting style, punching power and combination punching. He holds a 72% knockout-to-win percentage.

== Amateur career ==
At age 17, Valdez upset 2007 PanAm champion Carlos Cuadras in the semifinal of the 2007 National Championships and won the bantamweight championship in his next bout.

At the Olympic qualifier, he edged out Brazilian James Pereira in the semifinal and got one of two votes even though he lost in the final to Cuba's Yankiel León, getting a silver medal and a pass to the Beijing Olympics with only 3 international bouts under his belt. In Beijing however, he ran right into the eventual gold medal winner Enkhbatyn Badar-Uugan of Mongolia and lost his first bout 4–15.

In 2008, he moved up to Featherweight and won the first 2008 Youth World Amateur Boxing Championships. The tournament was held in Guadalajara in his home country, and he showed off the experience he had gained by beating his opponents from Barbados, Uzbekistan, Kazakhstan, Ukraine and Russia. In the semi-finals, he knocked out the opponent from Ukraine in the first round. In the finals, he dominated the opposition, such as Russian Maxim Dadashev, whom he beat 12–0 in the final.

In Milan, at the 2009 World Amateur Boxing Championships (seniors), he won the bronze medal and became the first Mexican to achieve a medal at a World Champhionships in the history of the sport in Mexico.

After his run through of the Featherweight division, once again Valdez moved back down to Bantamweight. There, he won his Olympic qualifier. Valdez won his first fight in the 2012 Olympic Games, defeating India's Shiva Thapa by a margin of 14–9. In his second fight of the games, he won against Tajikistan's Anvar Yunusov by a margin of 13–7 then lost 13–19 to Ireland's John Joe Nevin.

== Professional career ==
=== Super featherweight ===
==== Early career ====
On 28 August 2012, Valdez signed a long-term contract with manager Frank Espinoza. Later that year, he signed a five-year promotional contract with Top Rank. Valdez made his professional debut at the age of 21 on 3 November. He defeated Angel Prado via 2nd round stoppage in a scheduled six-round fight. The fight took place at the Centro de Usos Multiples in Hermosillo, Sonora, Mexico. In December, Valdez knocked out Corben Page in round 2 at the Texas Station Casino in Las Vegas, Nevada. Both fights took place at featherweight.

In 2013, Valdez fought a total of six times at super featherweight, winning all the bouts inside the distance. By the end of the year, he racked up a record of 8 wins, all by stoppage and no defeats.

On 1 March 2014 Valdez fought Samuel Sanchez on the undercard of Lomachenko-Salido at the Alamodome in San Antonio, Texas. The fight was halted in round 3, as Valdez won via technical knockout. Valdez next fought in April on the Pacquiao-Bradley II undercard. He fought Adrian Perez (10–4–1, 1 KO) for the vacant NABF Junior super featherweight title in his first 8-round bout. The fight ended in round 4 when Valdez landed with a left hand to the liver, followed by a right hand, which sent Perez down on all fours. Perez made no attempt to get to his feet as the referee waved an end the bout. The three judges had Valdez ahead (30–27) at the time of stoppage. Valdez successfully defended the title in May at the Forum in Inglewood, California retiring Noel Echevarria (11–2, 6 KOs) after round 6.

Valdez returned to featherweight for the first time in nine fights on 26 July and went on to claim the vacant NABF Junior featherweight title in an 8-round unanimous decision victory against experienced journeyman Juan Ruiz (23–14, 7 KOs) at the Celebrity Theater in Phoenix, Arizona. All three judges equally scored the fight 80–71 in Valdez's favour. Ruiz was deducted 1 point for excessive holding during the fight. The fight significantly ended the successive knockout streak dating back to Valdez's fight in November 2012.

Valdez made a defence of the NABF Junior super featherweight title in the Alamadome in November against Mexican boxer Alberto Garza 26–8–1, 21 KOs). Valdez retained the title via a technical knockout in round 7. The fight marked Valdez's HBO debut. Valdez fought a further five times towards the end of 2014 through to December 2015. Notable boxers he defeated included former super bantamweight title challenger Chris Avalos, Jose Ramirez and former interim World featherweight title challenger Ruben Tamayo.

=== Featherweight ===
==== Valdez vs. Gradovich ====
It was announced that Valdez would be fighting on the undercard of Pacquiao-Bradley III on 9 April 2016 for the vacant WBO NABO featherweight title against another prospect and former IBF featherweight champion Evgeny Gradovich (21–1–1, 9 KOs) at MGM Grand Garden Arena in Paradise, Nevada. Valdez defeated Gradovich via 4th round stoppage to claim the vacant title and move up in the WBO rankings. Valdez dominated from the opening bell with head and body combinations also appearing to have broken Gradovich's jaw. In round 4, Valdez caught Gradovich with a left hook which put him on the canvas. Referee Russell Mora started the count. Gradovich managed to get up, but Mora made the call to end the fight.

==== Valdez vs. Rueda ====
On 23 July 2016, the undercard of Crawford-Postol at the MGM Grand Garden Arena, Valdez fought the undefeated Argentine boxer Matias Rueda (26–0, 23 KOs). Two days prior to the fight, it was announced the fight would be for the WBO featherweight title after Vasyl Lomachenko decided to stay at super featherweight and vacate the featherweight title. Valdez claimed his first world title by winning the vacant WBO championship with a second-round stoppage win over Rueda, dropping him twice with body shots. After the second knockdown, referee Russell Mora waved the count for the TKO.

==== Valdez vs. Osawa, Marriaga ====
Valdez made his first title defense against 31 year old Japanese boxer Hiroshige Osawa (30–3–4, 19 KOs) on the undercard of Pacquiao-Vargas PPV bout on 5 November 2016. Osawa was ranked #1 by the WBO. The fight took place at the Thomas & Mack Center in Paradise, Nevada. Valdez told FightNews.com of his excitement for his first title defence, "I am excited for this fight. I am looking at this fight like if I am the challenger and I want to keep that mentality to do my best and win the fight. I am ready for my first title defense but I am still training like I am trying to win that title." In a one-sided fight, Valdez halted Osawa in round 7 when he hurt him with a hook followed by a barrage of shots that prompted referee Vic Drakulich to stop the fight. Valdez hit accurate jabs and hard shots to the body and head from the opening bell and managed to knock down Osawa in round 4. At the time of stoppage, Valdez was ahead 60–53 on all three judges' scorecards. According to Compubox, Valdez landed 191 punches, to only 35 by Osawa, which included 129 power punches to his Osawa's 18.

On 17 February 2017 Top Rank announced that Valdez would be making a mandatory defence of his WBO featherweight title against former WBA 'Super' World featherweight title challenger Miguel Marriaga (25–1, 21 KOs) in the main event at the StubHub Center in Carson, California, on 22 April 2017. Marriaga knocked out Guy Robb in August 2016 to become the number one challenger. Bob Arum confirmed the undercard card would also include Gilberto Ramírez and Jessie Magdaleno defending their respective WBO titles and Olympic silver medalist Shakur Stevenson making his professional debut. In front of 5,419 fans, Valdez retained his WBO title in a slugfest, but was taken the 12 round distance for the first time in his professional career. It was also the first time in six fights going back to June 2015 that Valdez had a decision victory. The final judges scorecards were 119–108, 118–109 and 116–111. Many at ringside believed the wider scores did not do Marriaga any justice as it was a back and forth action fight. Marriaga was knocked down in round 10 after some strong middle rounds.

==== Valdez vs. Servania ====
In July 2017, Top Rank set a return date of 22 September 2017 for Valdez to make a third defence of his WBO title. His manager Frank Espinoza confirmed that he was back in training. A venue in Tucson, Arizona was discussed. On 9 August, it was revealed that Valdez would fight unbeaten Filipino boxer Genesis Servania (29–0,12 KOs) in a voluntary defence at the Tucson Convention Center, with Gilberto Ramírez once again co-featuring. Valdez stated that he would like to unify the division and fight the winner of Leo Santa Cruz and Abner Mares, which was likely to take place in the fall of 2017.

In front of a crowd of 4,103, Valdez managed to recover from a knockdown and score a knockdown of his own, en route to retaining his WBO title via unanimous decision after 12 rounds. The three judges scored the fight 117–109, 116–110, 115–111 in favour of Valdez. Servania dropped Valdez in round 4 with a right hand to the head. Valdez recovered, but looked visibly hurt as he tried to shake it off. Servania was dropped following a big left hook the very next round. After round 6, the fight became one-sided. Servania struggled to let his hands go. After one punch, Valdez would grab Servania in a clinch. Valdez began to work the jab and throw power shots until the closing bell. In the post-fight interview, Valdez shrugged off the knockdown, "I never thought I was gonna be on the canvas like that. But this is boxing. To be completely honest, I wasn't really hurt. I was really surprised. I was like, 'OK, I'm on the floor. But now, I'm gonna get up and I'm gonna do my work." Valdez managed to land 192 of 697 punches (28%), he earned $400,000 for the fight, while Servania, who earned a $55,000 purse connected 120 of his 450 thrown (27%). Servania seemed upset with the wide scorecards, felt it was close and was open to fighting Valdez again. The whole averaged 706,000 viewers on ESPN.

==== Valdez vs. Quigg ====
Top Rank stated they were planning to have Valdez back in action in February 2018, and hoped to have him fight three times during 2018. On 28 November 2017, according to RingTV, Valdez was to make his next defence on 10 March 2018 at the StubHub Center in Carson, California, headlining a Top Rank card on ESPN. On 3 January 2018, ESPN first reported that a deal was close to being reached for Valdez to defend his WBO featherweight title against British boxer Scott Quigg (34–1–2, 25 KOs). On 13 January, the fight was finalized. Valdez came in at 125.8 pounds at the weigh in for his fourth defence. Quigg however came in 3 pounds over at 128.8 pounds. He was not allowed to re-weigh. According to the California State Athletic Commission, if a fighter is 2 pounds or more over the contractual limit, he would not be allowed to lose the extra weight as he would have been 'dried out', any more weight loss could potentially be dangerous to their health. The CSAC fined Quigg 20% of his official purse of $100,000, with Valdez receiving half of the money from the fine. Quigg's purse was believed to be far more at around $500,000 plus British TV rights. Valdez was due his highest purse at $420,000, not including the additional $10,000 from Quigg's purse.

After a hard-fought 12 round battle with saw Valdez break Quigg's nose and in return Valdez have his own front teeth damaged, the final scorecards read 117–111, 117-111 and 118–110 in favour of the Valdez, thus retaining his WBO title. Quigg suffered a cut over his left eye in round 5 which caused him issues later in the fight whereas Valdez after having his mouth busted, was seen with blood pouring out in the second half of the fight. The difference in the fight was that Valdez had too much hand and foot speed for Quigg and was able unload on multiple punches on Quigg. Valdez's style of a higher punch output also caused him to take a lot of punishment throughout the fight. Valdez was hurt in round 5 from a big left hook from Quigg. In round 11, Valdez hurt Quigg with a hard head shot in the final 20 seconds. It was in round 11 that Quigg began to use his jab more to his own advantage. Valdez was then hurt by a low blow in that round. In round 12, Valdez tied Quigg up frequently and used movement to stay out of trouble. Quigg was humble in defeat stating the better man won, but felt it was closer. ESPN scored the fight for Valdez 115–113. They also reported that Quigg weighed 142.2 pounds compared to Valdez who was 135.6 pounds on fight night. CompuBox numbers showed that Valdez landed 238 of 914 punches thrown (26%), and Quigg landed 143 of his 595 thrown (24%). After the fight Quigg explained the reason he missed weight was because he had fractured his foot four weeks before the fight and unable to run to lose the extra pounds. Valdez visited oral surgeon Dr. Douglas Galen in Beverly Hills the following Monday and had his jaw wired shut. The card was watched by an average 1.1 million viewers on ESPN.

==== Valdez vs. Tommasone ====
On 13 August 2018 it was announced Valdez had left longtime trainer Manny Robles and would instead return to training under Eddy Reynoso, well known for training Saul "Canelo" Álvarez. One of the main reasons for the change was for Valdez to tighten his defence after being involved in slugfests since winning the WBO title. On 1 November, it was reported that Valdez was looking to make a return to the ring at the Mexico City Arena on 12 January 2019. Later that month, a fight against 33 year old Spanish boxer Andoni Gago (20–3–3, 6 KOs) was finalized and would take place in Tucson, Arizona. At the time, Gago was ranked #14 with the WBO, making it an official title defence. Entering the fight, Gago was unbeaten in five fights, having lost to Lee Selby in March 2017. In December, it was reported the card would be scrapped and Valdez's return would be postponed. The reason behind this was because Gago was unable to secure a travel visa in time to make the trip to the United States. Some sources stated Valdez would instead return on the Alvarez-Kovalev rematch undercard. A day later it was announced that Valdez would next fight at The Ford Center at The Star in Frisco, Texas on 2 February 2019, against Italian boxer Carmine Tommasone (19–0, 5 KOs) as his opponent. Valdez expressed that his jaw had completely recovered and he felt mentally stronger as a fighter. He shared that his training camp was successful and he was eager to return to the ring. Tommasone was making his first professional appearance outside of Italy. He was the WBO's #14 featherweight contender.

Valdez dropped Tommasone four times en route to a stoppage in the seventh round, retaining his WBO title for the fifth time. He recorded two knockdowns in the fourth round, followed by one each in the sixth and seventh rounds, prompting referee Mark Nelson to rightfully intervene and halt the increasingly one-sided bout just nine seconds into the seventh round. The first knockdown was from a right hand and the second knockdown was from a left hook to the body, which forced Tommasone's right knee to touch the canvas. The next knockdown was following a sharp jab, two minutes into the sixth. The stoppage came via a right uppercut in the seventh. According to Compubox, Valdez landed 88 of 293 (30%) total punches, while Tommasone landed 49 of 300 (16%). Valdez was leading on all three judges' scorecards at the time of the stoppage. Valdez was leading on all three judges' scorecards at the time of the stoppage. The card peaked at 1.022 million viewers on ESPN.

==== Valdez vs. Sanchez ====
A week after the Tommasone fight, his manager Frank Espinoza mentioned the chance of seeing him compete in May before pursuing a unification bout, potentially against either Josh Warrington or Léo Santa Cruz. In April, it was reported that he would headline an ESPN televised card on 8 June 2019. On 1 May, it was reported the card would take place at the Reno-Sparks Convention Center in Reno, Nevada, with his opponent rumoured to be Erick Ituarte (21–1–1), who was on a 14-fight win streak. A week later, the WBO declined to sanction the fight for their world title, as Ituarte was not ranked by them. If the fight was still to take place, it was to be a 10-round non-title bout. On 9 May, Top Rank revealed a new challenger for Valdez: 24-year-old Jason Sanchez (14–0, 7 KOs). Sanchez recently joined Top Rank following his surprising victory over Jean Carlos Rivera in October 2018. Valdez emphasized the challenges of meeting the featherweight limit, but expressed his determination to remain in the division in pursuit of meaningful matchups. Valdez weighed in at 125.4 pounds, marking his lightest weight since his first title defense over two years ago. Sanchez came in at 124.8 pounds.

Valdez successfully retained his WBO title by defeating Sanchez via unanimous decision in front of 2,412 in attendance. Valdez knocked down Sanchez early in the fifth round with a left hook, which shifted momentum in his favor and allowed him to assert control for the remainder of the fight. Valdez exhibited impressive offensive talent, combining powerful left hooks and overhand right punches. His performance highlighted his growth into a more defensively aware and strategic boxer under trainer Eddy Reynoso. Valdez pressed the action in the final round, attempting to finish the fight despite already having a wide lead on the scorecards. The judges scored the bout 118-109 (twice) and 117–110 in favor of Valdez. According to CompuBox statistics, Valdez landed 195 of 509 punches (38%), including 113 power punches, while Sanchez landed 107 of 869 punches (12%). Valdez voiced doubts about remaining at featherweight, citing difficulties in meeting the 126-pound limit, and contemplated fights in both the featherweight and super featherweight divisions. Promoter Bob Arum mentioned plans for a potential fight later in the year between Valdez and Carl Frampton, dependent on Frampton's upcoming fights.

In November 2019, Valdez spoke about the difficulty in making the 126-pound featherweight limit. Valdez described it as "going through hell" just to make weight, highlighting how the last few pounds felt like losing 20. He faced extreme dehydration, to the point where he only consumed a few berries or grapes the entire week before the fight and abstained from water for several days while resorting to rinsing his mouth and spitting it out to cope. The experience left him drained, fatigued, and not feeling like himself during the fight.

On 24 July 2019, the WBO mandated that Valdez defend his featherweight world title against undefeated challenger Shakur Stevenson (12–0, 7 KOs), with 2 August as the purse bid date. Top Rank secured the bid at $1.5 million. However, Carl Moretti from Top Rank mentioned that the fight was unlikely to take place, as Valdez planned to move up in weight to take on Miguel Berchelt. Later that day, Valdez officially vacated the title.

=== Return to super featherweight ===
==== Valdez vs. Lopez ====
On 2 October 2019, it was announced a card was scheduled to take place at the Cosmopolitan Hotel and Casino in Las Vegas on 30 November. It was reported that Valdez was to make his super featherweight debut against seasoned veteran Andrés Gutiérrez (38–2–1, 25 KOs). Gutierrez was on a 3-fight win streak, after losing to Abner Mares in 2017. Two days later, his manager Frank Espinoza stated the fight was set and would air on ESPN+. The card was made official on 15 October and take place at The Chelsea, with Valdez to headline in a 10-round bout. Valdez weighed under the limit at 129.8 pounds. Gutiérrez was officially announced to weigh 141 pounds. However, since he missed the weight limit by over two full divisions, he was removed from the event. Top Rank started developing a backup plan. Gutiérrez was suspended by the WBC, which subsequently initiated an immediate investigation into the situation. The inquiry was prompted by Gutiérrez's assertion that he was within the allowed limits during the pre-fight weigh-ins at 30, 15, and 7 days prior to the event.

Adam Lopez (13–1, 6 KOs), who was set to compete on the undercard, accepted Bob Arum's proposal on Friday night to fight Valdez with less than 24 hours' notice. Originally, Lopez was scheduled to fight Luis Coria in a 10-round featherweight bout. By accepting the fight, Lopez's earnings were increased. On the fight change, Valdez said, "I trained hard for three months making the sacrifices, and I am very upset with Andres Gutierrez. He was unprofessional. As soon as I heard 141 pounds, I still wanted to fight him, but my team and Bob Arum said Gutierrez was out. I give credit to Adam Lopez for stepping up. It will be a great fight tomorrow night." Valdez took home a £300k purse, whilst Lopez was set to earn $75,000. Valdez was a -2000 favorite going into the fight. Valdez was unexpectedly knocked down by Lopez, but he ultimately triumphed with a knockout in the seventh round. In the second round, Lopez had sent Valdez to the canvas with a left hook to the head. After the knockdown, Lopez kept causing Valdez difficulties with his rapid combinations, agile movement, and outstanding defensive abilities. In the seventh round, Valdez reversed the situation by knocking Lopez down. Although Lopez managed to get back on his feet, the referee, Russell Mora, intervened and halted the match shortly after. The official stoppage occurred at 2:53 of the round. Some observers believed the fight was stopped prematurely, arguing that Lopez should have been given the opportunity to keep going. At the time of stoppage, two of the judges scored the fight 57–56 and 58–57 for Valdez, whilst the remaining judge had it 57–56 in favour of Lopez.

==== Valdez vs. Velez ====
In June 2020, Top Rank revealed that Valdez would headline an ESPN event scheduled for July 21, which would be held without an audience. It was reported that former three-time world title challenger Jayson Vélez (29–6–1, 22 KOs) from Puerto Rico was expected to be named as his opponent. Vélez clarified that he had two choices: one was Valdez and the other was Chris Colbert for the interim WBA super featherweight title. However, he noted that a bout with Colbert would only occur later in the year. He said, "Valdez is a better known boxer, economically he is better and we have a date. It is a fight that I like more than Colbert, because Valdez fits my style better." The event was set to take place inside the MGM Grand "Bubble" with the fight scheduled for 10 rounds. Valdez came in at 129¾ pounds and Vélez weighed in at 130 pounds. Vélez sensed that Valdez was neglecting him with a world title opportunity on the horizon. He intended to defeat Valdez and then position himself as the next challenger for Miguel Berchelt.

Valdez faced a more challenging evening than anticipated while attempting to defeat Vélez. He managed to drop Vélez twice in the tenth round to achieve the stoppage. Overall, Valdez sent Vélez to the canvas three times, with knockdowns occurring in the fifth round and twice in the tenth. The first knockdown in the tenth came from a left hook that dropped Vélez to the canvas, visibly hurt as he got back up. Shortly after, Valdez connected with a powerful right hand that sent Vélez down near the ropes. Referee Tony Weeks halted the bout shortly, stopping the fight at 2:23 of the tenth round. The fight averaged more than 457,000 viewers and peaked at 460,000 viewers. The whole card peaked 471,000 viewers, which came in the penultimate match, which saw prospect Edgar Berlanga win via first round stoppage.

==== Valdez vs. Berchelt ====
On 25 September 2020, it was revealed that Miguel Berchelt (38–1, 34 KOs) would make his seventh title defense against Valdez on 12 December in Las Vegas. Valdez was the mandatory challenger for Berchelt, as he had vacated the featherweight title in order to move up and challenge the reigning WBC super featherweight champion. Valdez was ranked #1 by the WBC and #2 by the WBO at super featherweight.

Although it was never officially announced, the fight was postponed on 4 November, as Berchelt had tested positive for COVID-19. A month later, Berchelt was testing negative for COVID and back in training. During that time, 23 year old Shakur Stevenson (14–0, 8 KOs) said he would step in for Berchelt, but doubted Valdez and his team would accept the fight. Valdez hit back with the claims and said he was not ducking anyone, claiming the Berchelt fight was much tougher for him than fighting Stevenson. Stevenson also accused Valdez of ducking him in June 2020 as well. On 6 January 2021, the bout was rescheduled for 20 February headlining a ESPN card, to took place at the MGM Grand Conference Center in Paradise, Nevada. Berchelt stated it was a dream fight for him, one he had looked forward to since amateur days. Berchelt was the favorite heading into the fight and entering on a 17-fight win streak.

On fight week, Berchelt arrived in Las Vegas, but without his trainer Alfredo Caballero due to a visa discrepancy. Berchelt and his team were confident the issue would be resolved. They were in communication with the U.S. immigration officials. Within a day, at the final press conference, Berchelt said the issue was resolved and he would have his full team behind him. Both boxers came in at the weight limit of 130 pounds. There was some significance on the day of the weigh in, as it was 21 years to the date from Marco Antonio Barrera and Erik Morales first meeting of their epic rivalry, which was also an all-Mexican fight. Veteran Russell Mora was named as the referee for the contest.

Berchelt lost the fight by a tenth-round TKO. Valdez used his skill and speed advantage, managed to wear down Berchelt and knock him down in rounds nine and ten. Valdez was the better boxer from the start. In round 4, Valdez caused Berchelt to stumble into the ropes after a left hook to the head. Referee Mora called a knockdown in favour of Valdez, due to the ropes holding Berchelt up. Berchelt did not recover and took some further punishment in round 5. Valdez was tired between rounds six to eight, but used his skill in countering Berchelt. Valdez came out in round 9 rejuvenated and dropped Berchelt again. The ending came with Valdez knocking Berchelt out cold with a left-hand shot that caused him to fall over face first on the canvas. The fight was immediately called off. Berchelt was then put on his back for several minutes before being helped sit up. Valdez was leading on the scorecards at the time of the stoppage, with scores of 89–80, 88–81 and 87–82, which was from Max DeLuca who scored the first 3 rounds for Berchelt. Valdez was happy with the win, calling it his biggest win of his career, and went on to call out Stevenson. Valdez's trainer, Eddy Reynoso, who was also well known for being the trainer of pound-for-pound star Canelo Álvarez, said the fight was the proudest moment of his career.

According to Compubox, Berchelt landed 99 of his 447 punches thrown (22.1%) and Valdez, who was constantly the more busier fighter, landed 149 of his 534 punches thrown (27.9%). Valdez outlanded Berchelt in 8 of the 10 rounds. Berchelt was taken to hospital following the fight, held for observation and released the next day. He was allowed to go back to his hotel after a CT scan showed no concerns.

Nielsen Media Research reported an average audience of 895,000 for the fight, and peak viewership at 960,000, which was during the main event. The number was likely to surpass 1 million viewers, as the fight was also shown on the ESPN+ app, which Nielsen do not report viewership number for.

==== Valdez vs. Conceição ====
Valdez made his first defense of his WBC super featherweight title against the 2016 Olympic Gold medalist Robson Conceição on 10 September 2021, at the Casino Del Sol in Tucson, Arizona, United States. On 31 August, it was revealed that Valdez had tested positive for the banned stimulant phentermine. On 2 September, his B-sample tested positive as well. The fight with Conceição would still happen however, as the Pascua Yaqui Tribe Athletic Commission went by WADA guidelines, which only prohibit stimulants in-competition. Valdez won the closely contested fight by unanimous decision, with two judges awarding him a 115-112 scorecard, while the third judge scored it 117-110 for Valdez. Conceição had a better start to the fight, although he began to tire around the mid-rounds, after which Valdez began to take over. A number of fans and fighters disagreed with the scorecards, with Sunny Edwards stating "So you let him cheat with drugs, then gift him the scorecards", while Tony Harrison wrote "I don't think Valdez won but that's me on to the next". However, most media members scored the fight for Valdez.

==== Valdez vs. Stevenson ====
On 16 January 2022, there were negotiations that Valdez would have a unification bout with WBO champion Shakur Stevenson (17–0, 9 KOs). 3 days later, the fight was confirmed for 30 April at the MGM Grand Garden Arena, Paradise, Nevada and officially announced on 17 February. The fight would be part of a tripleheader. Stevenson felt it would make him a pay-per-view star. For the contest, PED test was heavily emphasised. Throughout the build up, Stevenson used the word "cheating". This was a dig at Valdez, who claimed he innocently ingested stimulants and not a PED. Stevenson weighed at the 130 pound limit and Valdez came in at 129.6 pounds.

Stevenson dominated using his jab and footwork to outland and outwork Valdez, even scoring a knockdown in round 6. Valdez was not competitive and had no answer for Stevenson's defensive skills, reflexes, and more importantly his size, which was a big disadvantage for him. In the final round, Shakur looked to play it safe, using movement rather than going for the kill and finishing strong. Stevenson won by unanimous decision with scores of 117–110, 118–109 and 118–110. In doing so, Stevenson unified the WBC and vacant The Ring super featherweight titles with his WBO belt. According to CompuBox stats, Stevenson landed 189 of his 580 punches thrown with a connect rate of 32.6%, while Valdez had a connect rate of 21.7% which saw him land 110 of his 508 thrown.

In the post fight interview, Stevenson said he had beat the Canelo team and opened up a potential fight with WBC lightweight champion Devin Haney. Stevenson then proposed to his girlfriend in the ring. The fight drew in an average of 1,353,000 viewers on ESPN and peaked at 1,440,000.

==== Valdez vs. Lopez II ====
On 9 November 2022, Valdez was ordered by the WBO to face the reigning featherweight belt holder Emanuel Navarrete for the vacant WBO junior lightweight championship. The belt was made available following Shakur Stevenson's failure to make weight before his victory against Robson Conceição on 23 September. The title bout was booked to take place on 3 February 2023, and headlined an ESPN broadcast card, which was expected to take place at the Desert Diamond Arena in Glendale, Arizona, on 3 February 2023. Valdez withdrew from the fight on 13 December, with an undisclosed injury. Navarrete remained on the card and controversially defeated Liam Wilson to win the vacant title.

On 17 March, Valdez got booked to compete on the Devin Haney-Vasiliy Lomachenko PPV undercard against Adam Lopez (16–4, 6 KOs), a rematch from 2019. Valdez was hoping to secure a fight with Navarrete following this bout. The undercard was made official with the PPV taking place on 20 May 2025 at the MGM Grand Garden Arena in Paradise. Lopez was eager to revive his own career and cautioned Valdez not to take him lightly, stating he was a much more experienced than when they first fought. Both boxers registered weights slightly above the super featherweight limit, as no title was contested. They both weighed the same 132.1 pounds.

Valdez successfully returned to the ring after more than a year of inactivity, achieving a 10-round unanimous decision victory over Lopez. In the early rounds, Valdez exerted considerable pressure, employing effective head movement techniques. He was able to inflict damage on Lopez during the third and fourth rounds, demonstrating proficiency in both offense and defense. Lopez responded in the middle rounds, landing several punches and making the contest competitive. However, Valdez's persistent pressure took its toll in the later rounds, with him nearly stopping Lopez in the final round. Although Lopez displayed commendable resilience, he was ultimately outmatched by the more experienced Valdez. The judges scored the bout 98–92, 98–91, and 97–93 in favor of Valdez. After the bout, Valdez told reporters, "We all want (Navarrete), man. Nothing but respect for him. He's a great champion."

==== Valdez vs. Navarrete ====
On 22 May, it was reported the bout with Emanuel Navarrete (37–1, 31 KOs) was to be rescheduled to take place on 12 August 2023, at the Desert Diamond Arena in Glendale, Arizona. On 7 June, the fight was made official. The card was broadcast live on ESPN, ESPN Deportes and ESPN+. Bob Arum praised the fight, stating, "Emanuel Navarrete and Oscar Valdez are proud warriors, and this is a fight that is destined to go down as a classic." Navarrete believed that taking on major fights was his path to the top of the division and proving he was the best in his weight class. Navarrete initially weighed 130.1 pounds for his first title defense. He then stripped down, and on his second attempt, weighed 130 pounds. Valdez weighed 129.8 pounds in his effort to secure a third world title.

The fight took place in front of 10,246 spectators. Navarrete held onto his belt, winning the fight via a clear unanimous decision. He dominated Valdez with his constant punching and power. It was a gritty battle with both fighters showing a lot of heart, but Navarrete's unyielding pressure made the difference. Navarrete threw an impressive 1,038 punches, landing 216 of them, while Valdez managed to throw 436 punches and land 140, highlighting Navarrete's incredible work rate. He kept Valdez on the defensive and connected with uppercuts and hooks that led to some swelling under Valdez's right eye. Valdez did try to find his chances with counter left hooks and had some success in the middle rounds, especially around rounds 5 to 9, but he just couldn't match Navarrete's pace. The judges scored the fight 119–109, 118–110, and 116–112 in favor of Navarrete. Afterwards, Valdez admitted that Navarrete was the better fighter that night, showing disappointment but also respect, and he promised to come back stronger. Navarrete fought through inflammation in his right hand. The ringside doctor looked over the hand after the bout stating it should heal within a couple of days. An average of 808,000 viewers watched the main event, with a peak audience of 884,000.

==== Valdez vs. Wilson ====
On 13 January 2014, sources indicated that Valdez was preparing to return to the ring after his previous defeat, with a potential bout scheduled for 29 March at the Desert Diamond Arena in Glendale. Preliminary discussions were underway regarding a match with Australian boxer Liam Wilson (13–2, 7 KOs). On 30 January, the fight was formally announced, scheduled for 10-rounds. On the announcement, Valdez said, "This fight against Liam Wilson means everything to me. It's every boxer's dream to become a world champion, so I have to get past this challenge so I can fight for a world title again. I respect Liam Wilson, but in the ring, I'm going to do everything possible to walk away victorious." Wilson, similar to Valdez, was defeated by Navarrete in February 2023, after initially knocking him down during the fight. The bout ultimately ended with Wilson being stopped in the ninth round. Valdez indicated that he aimed to deliver a more comprehensive performance, having gained valuable insights from his defeat to Navarrete. During fight week, the bout was altered to a 12-round contest for the vacant interim WBO championship. The WBO noted that Navarrete was moving up in weight to compete for the vacant WBO lightweight title against Denys Berinchyk, while maintaining his super featherweight champion status. Following the fight, Navarrete would decide whether to vacate his super featherweight title or return to that division, depending on the outcome. Valdez weighed 129.7 pounds and Wilson came in at 129.6 pounds.

A total of 7,102 fans filled the arena as Valdez secured a victory over Wilson through a seventh-round technical knockout, claiming the vacant interim WBO super featherweight title. Valdez landed a significant left hook on Wilson in the seventh round, followed by a series of unanswered strikes, prompting referee Mark Nelson to intervene and stop the bout. The stoppage came at 2:48 into the seventh round. Some observers suggested that the referee may have acted prematurely, as Wilson appeared to be attempting to retaliate and was in the process of throwing a punch when the fight was called. The referee made the decision to halt the contest after Wilson endured a barrage of heavy blows from Valdez during the concluding moments of the round. Wilson performed strongly in the initial two rounds, delivering several powerful shots. He managed to hurt Valdez with a body shot in the second round, prompting Valdez to feign a low blow. However, starting from the third round, Valdez gained control of the match, landing a series of effective punches. While Wilson continued to land some significant shots, the frequency decreased. In the third round, Wilson sustained a bloody nose, which remained an issue throughout the rest of the fight. Wilson engaged in close-range fighting with Valdez starting in the fifth round and endured significant punishment. In between the rounds, Wilson did not adhere to the strategies recommended by his corner, who advised him to maintain distance in the fight. After the fight, Valdez said, "You might lose in life, but there's an obligation to come back strong. … [This win's] got to be up there, it means a lot. I proved a lot of people wrong again." He expressed interest in fighting the other champions at super featherweight for a unification. According to CompuBox, Valdez landed 169 of 380 punches thrown (44.5%) and Wilson landed 102 of his 398 thrown (25.6%).

==== Valdez vs. Navarrete II ====
In May 2024, Navarrete (38–2–1, 31 KOs) was defeated by split decision against Denys Berinchyk in his pursuit of a fourth division championship. In June, the WBO ordered for Navarrete to make a defence of his WBO title against the interim champion Valdez (32–2, 24 KOs). On 2 August, the rematch was rumoured to take place at the Footprint Center in Phoenix, Arizona on 7 December 2024. In October the card was finalised as a doubleheader featuring rematches. Valdez was pleased with the chance to seek retribution. The card took place a day before Bob Arum's 93rd birthday. Navarrete officially weighed in at 129.9 pounds, while Valdez weighed in at 130 pounds. Navarrete was entering the fight with a record 0-1-1 in his last two bouts, with his last win being against Valdez.

There was 8,438 fans in attendance. Navarrete dominated the rematch, dropping Valdez three times, eventually stopping in with a liver shot in the sixth round, to retain his world title. Navarrete dropped Valdez once near the end of Round 1 with a combination, again near the end of Round 4 from a right hand, and a third time in Round 5 with a left uppercut. The bout ended in the sixth when Navarrete landed a well-placed liver shot that sent Valdez down for the final count at 2:42. Judges had Navarrete ahead convincingly on all scorecards at the stoppage, with scores of 50-43 and 49-44 twice. Navarrete showcased improved aggression and precision compared to their first fight, using sharp angles and volume punching that overwhelmed Valdez, who could not find effective counters. Navarrete showcased improved aggression and precision compared to their first fight, using sharp angles and volume punching that overwhelmed Valdez, who could not find effective counters. Valdez struggled to keep pace and absorb the onslaught, failing to adjust his strategy effectively. Navarrete credited a surgically repaired left hand for his enhanced power, marking a new phase in his career. Over the six rounds, Navarrete landed 106 of 380 punches thrown (27.6%) and Valdez landed 78 of his 232 thrown (33.6%).

==== Valdez vs. Medina ====
Boxing Scene reported on 31 July 2025, that Valdez was set to return to the ring in Mexico on 6 September. It was also reported that Valdez was back training with Manny Robles, after their split in 2018. A press release later announced Ricky Medina (16–3, 9 KOs) was his opponent and the card would take place at the Domo Binacional in Nogales, Mexico. In what was a tougher than expected fight, Valdez defeated Medina via unanimous decision after 10 rounds. The fight was crucial for Valdez to maintain his position in elite competition. Valdez sustained a shoulder injury early in the fight but was able to control the tempo and deliver effective combinations as the rounds progressed. The younger Medina exhibited significant resilience, pressing Valdez and maintaining competitiveness, which made it a challenging evening for him. Valdez began strongly but found his rhythm in the middle rounds, utilizing body shots and precise uppercuts to wear down Medina. He landed hard shots in the eighth and ninth rounds, though Medina absorbed them effectively. The judges scored the bout 100–90, 97–93, and 98–92. In the post-fight interview, Valdez acknowledged the challenges of the fight and his shoulder issue while expressing his ambition to reclaim a world title. He thanked the fans and recognized the need for improvement in future matches to achieve his championship goals.

== Professional boxing record ==
36 fights	33 wins	3 losses
By knockout	24	1
By decision	9	2

No.	Result	Record	Opponent	Type	Round, time	Date	Location	Notes
36	Win	33–3	Richard Medina	UD	10	6 Aug 2025	Domo Binacional, Nogales, Sonora, Mexico	
35	Loss	32–3	Emanuel Navarrete	KO	6 (12), 2:42	7 Dec 2024	Footprint Center, Phoenix, Arizona, U.S.	For WBO super featherweight title
34	Win	32–2	Liam Wilson	TKO	7 (12), 2:48	29 Mar 2024	Desert Diamond Arena, Glendale, Arizona, U.S.	Won vacant WBO interim super featherweight title
33	Loss	31–2	Emanuel Navarrete	UD	12	12 Aug 2023	Desert Diamond Arena, Glendale, Arizona, U.S.	For WBO super featherweight title
32	Win	31–1	Adam Lopez	UD	10	20 May 2023	MGM Grand Garden Arena, Paradise, Nevada, U.S.	
31	Loss	30–1	Shakur Stevenson	UD	12	30 Apr 2022	MGM Grand Garden Arena, Paradise, Nevada, U.S.	Lost WBC super featherweight title; For WBO and vacant The Ring super featherweight titles
30	Win	30–0	Robson Conceição	UD	12	10 Sep 2021	Casino Del Sol, Tucson, Arizona, U.S.	Retained WBC super featherweight title
29	Win	29–0	Miguel Berchelt	KO	10 (12), 2:59	20 Feb 2021	MGM Grand Conference Center, Paradise, Nevada, U.S.	Won WBC super featherweight title
28	Win	28–0	Jayson Vélez	TKO	10 (10), 2:23	21 Jul 2020	MGM Grand Conference Center, Paradise, Nevada, U.S.	
27	Win	27–0	Adam Lopez	TKO	7 (10), 2:53	30 Nov 2019	Cosmopolitan of Las Vegas, Paradise, Nevada, U.S.	
26	Win	26–0	Jason Sanchez	UD	12	8 Jun 2019	Reno-Sparks Convention Center, Reno, Nevada, U.S.	Retained WBO featherweight title
25	Win	25–0	Carmine Tommasone	TKO	7 (12), 0:09	2 Feb 2019	Ford Center at The Star, Frisco, Texas, U.S.	Retained WBO featherweight title
24	Win	24–0	Scott Quigg	UD	12	10 Mar 2018	StubHub Center, Carson, California, U.S.	Retained WBO featherweight title
23	Win	23–0	Genesis Servania	UD	12	22 Sep 2017	Convention Center, Tucson, Arizona, U.S.	Retained WBO featherweight title
22	Win	22–0	Miguel Marriaga	UD	12	22 Apr 2017	StubHub Center, Carson, California, U.S.	Retained WBO featherweight title
21	Win	21–0	Hiroshige Osawa	TKO	7 (12), 1:50	5 Nov 2016	Thomas & Mack Center, Paradise, Nevada, U.S.	Retained WBO featherweight title
20	Win	20–0	Matias Rueda	TKO	2 (12), 2:18	23 Jul 2016	MGM Grand Garden Arena, Paradise, Nevada, U.S.	Won vacant WBO featherweight title
19	Win	19–0	Evgeny Gradovich	TKO	4 (10), 2:14	9 Apr 2016	MGM Grand Garden Arena, Paradise, Nevada,U.S.	Won vacant WBO-NABO featherweight title
18	Win	18–0	Ernie Sanchez	TKO	3 (10), 2:59	12 Dec 2015	Convention Center, Tucson, Arizona, U.S.	
17	Win	17–0	Chris Avalos	TKO	5 (10), 1:17	11 Sep 2015	Cosmopolitan of Las Vegas, Paradise, Nevada, U.S.	
16	Win	16–0	Ruben Tamayo	UD	10	27 Jun 2015	StubHub Center, Carson, California, U.S.	
15	Win	15–0	Jose Ramirez	KO	3 (8), 2:05	11 Apr 2015	Laredo Energy Arena, Laredo, Texas, U.S.	
14	Win	14–0	Jean Javier Soto	TKO	5 (8), 0:02	20 Dec 2014	Celebrity Theater, Phoenix, Arizona,U.S.	
13	Win	13–0	Alberto Garza	TKO	7 (8), 1:29	15 Nov 2014	Alamodome, San Antonio, Texas, U.S.	Retained NABF Junior super featherweight title
12	Win	12–0	Juan Ruiz	UD	8	26 Jul 2014	Celebrity Theatre, Phoenix, Arizona, U.S.	Won vacant NABF Junior featherweight title
11	Win	11–0	Noel Echeverria	RTD	6 (8), 3:00	17 May 2014	The Forum, Inglewood, California, U.S.	Retained NABF Junior super featherweight title
10	Win	10–0	Adrian Perez	KO	3 (8), 1:23	12 Apr 2014	MGM Grand Garden Arena, Paradise, Nevada, U.S.	Won vacant NABF Junior super featherweight title
9	Win	9–0	Samuel Sanchez	TKO	3 (6), 2:03	1 Mar 2014	Alamodome, San Antonio, Texas, U.S.	
8	Win	8–0	Cristian Barajas	TKO	1 (6), 1:27	21 Dec 2013	Caliente Racetrack, Tijuana, Mexico	
7	Win	7–0	Jesus Lule	TKO	5 (6), 2:48	9 Nov 2013	American Bank Center, Corpus Christi, Texas, U.S.	
6	Win	6–0	Jose Morales	TKO	3 (6), 1:57	28 Sep 2013	StubHub Center, Carson, California, U.S.	
5	Win	5–0	Gil Garcia	TKO	2 (6), 2:32	15 Jun 2013	American Airlines Center, Dallas, Texas, U.S.	
4	Win	4–0	Rocco Espinoza	TKO	1 (6), 2:58	11 May 2013	Uni-Trade Stadium, Laredo, Texas, U.S.	
3	Win	3–0	Carlos Gonzalez	TKO	4 (6), 0:58	16 Mar 2013	Home Depot Center, Carson, California, U.S.	
2	Win	2–0	Corben Page	TKO	2 (6), 2:24	7 Dec 2012	Texas Station Casino, Las Vegas, Nevada, U.S.	
1	Win	1–0	Angel Prado	TKO	2 (6), 2:59	3 Nov 2012	Centro de Usos Multiples, Hermosillo, Sonora, Mexico	

== Titles in boxing ==
=== Major world titles ===
- WBO featherweight champion (126 lbs)
- WBC super featherweight champion (130 lbs)

=== Interim world titles ===
- WBA interim super featherweight champion (130 lbs)

=== Regional/International titles ===
- WBO-NABO featherweight champion (126 lbs)
- NABF Junior featherweight champion (126 lbs)
- NABF Junior super featherweight champion (130 lbs)

== See also ==
- List of Mexican boxing world champions
- List of world featherweight boxing champions
- List of world super-featherweight boxing champions

Sporting positions
Regional boxing titles
New title	Junior NABF super featherweight champion 12 April 2014 – 2016; Vacated	Vacant Title next held by Ryan Garcia
Vacant Title last held by Gamalier Rodríguez	NABO featherweight champion 9 April 2016 – 23 July 2016; Won world title	Vacant Title next held by Miguel Marriaga
World boxing titles
Vacant Title last held by Vasiliy Lomachenko	WBO featherweight champion 23 July 2016 – 2 August 2019; Vacated	Vacant Title next held by Shakur Stevenson
Preceded by Miguel Berchelt	WBC super featherweight champion 20 February 2021 – 30 April 2022	Succeeded by Shakur Stevenson
Vacant Title last held by Shakur Stevenson	WBO super featherweight champion Interim title 29 March – 7 Dec 2024; Lost bid for full title	Vacant
