= Idel Torriente =

Cuban boxer (born 1986)

Personal information
- Born: September 9, 1986 (age 40) Havana, Cuba
Medal record
Men's Boxing
Representing Cuba
Pan American Games
Gold medal – first place	2007 Rio de Janeiro	Featherweight

Idel Torriente Leal (born September 9, 1986) is a Cuban amateur boxer who won the Pan American featherweight title 2007 and qualified for the Olympics.

== Career ==
In 2006 the southpaw beat teenage star Roniel Iglesias in the semis of the bantamweight national championships but lost the final to superstar Guillermo Rigondeaux 4:13.

He went up to featherweight and won the national title vs Ivan Oñate 21:18. At the 2007 Pan American Games he beat Argentinian Jesús Cuéllar, Jamaican Nicholas Walters, Orlando Rizo and Abner Cotto (PR) in the final 7:5.

He lost his national title 2008 to archrival Iván Oñate but was sent to the qualifier where he qualified for the Olympics by beating Robson Conceiçao and Luis Enrique Porozo. In Beijing he beat Prince Octopus Dzanie 11:2, Enkhzorig Zorigtbaatar 10:9 but lost to Shahin Imranov 16:18 and didn't medal.

In 2009 he went up to lightweight but lost the national final to Lorenzo Sotamayor. He was sent regardless to the 2009 World Amateur Boxing Championships where he beat two unknowns then ran into favorite Domenico Valentino and lost 5:10.
