= Sergey Vodopyanov =

Russian boxer

Personal information
- Full name: Сергей Водопьянов
- Nationality: Russia
- Born: 20 September 1987 (age 38) Taldykorgan, Kazakh SSR, Soviet Union
- Height: 1.69 m (5 ft 6 1/2 in)

Sport
- Sport: Boxing
- Weight class: Bantamweight
Medal record
World Amateur Championships
Gold medal – first place	2007 Chicago	Bantamweight
Silver medal – second place	2009 Milan	Featherweight

Sergey Vodopyanov (Russian: Серге́й Водопьянов) (born 20 September 1987 in Taldykorgan, Kazakhstan) is a Russian amateur boxer best known for winning gold in the bantamweight class at the 2007 World Amateur Boxing Championships.

== Career ==
=== 2004 - 2006 ===
Vodopyanov won the silver medal at the 2004 Junior World Championships, where he lost to Hungarian Pál Bedák.

In 2006 he won the silver medal at flyweight at the Russian Championships, losing to three-times European champion Georgy Balakshin of Russia.

At the 2006 Junior World Championships he made an early exit against eventual champion Vasyl Lomachenko.

=== 2007 ===
He won the 2007 Russian Championships in the bantamweight category against Zinat Zhandybayev, 27:25.

In Chicago at the 2007 World Amateur Boxing Championships the 20-year-old beat local hero Gary Russell Jr. 16:6 and Puerto Rican McJoe Arroyo 20:9 to reach the finals. There he edged out Mongolian Enkhbatyn Badar-Uugan 16:14.

=== 2008 Beijing Olympics ===
He lost in the round of 16 in a 2008 Beijing Olympics bantamweight class fight to India's Akhil Kumar. The judges awarded the fight to Kumar with the scores tied 9–9 after four rounds, ruling that the Indian fighter had landed the most punches.

=== 2012 London Olympics ===
At the 2012 Summer Olympics, he again fought in the bantamweight class, and was again knocked out in the second round, beating Alberto Melian in the first round before losing to Robenilson de Jesus in the second.
