= Miguel Marriaga (boxer) =

Colombian boxer (born 1986)

Personal information
- Nickname: The Scorpion
- Nationality: Colombian
- Born: Miguel Ángel Marriaga; 31 October 1986 (age 39) Arjona, Bolívar, Colombia
- Height: 173 cm (5 ft 8 in)
- Weight: Featherweight; Super featherweight

Boxing career
- Reach: 170 cm (67 in)
- Stance: Orthodox

Boxing record
- Total fights: 39
- Wins: 31
- Win by KO: 26
- Losses: 8

Miguel Ángel Marriaga (born 31 October 1986) is a Colombian professional boxer who has challenged for major world titles on three occasions.

On 13 June 2015, he lost by unanimous decision against Nicholas Walters for the WBA (Super) featherweight title. On 22 April 2017, Marriaga suffered the defeat by unanimous decision against Óscar Valdez for the WBO featherweight belt. On 5 August 2017 he challenged for the WBO junior-lightweight belt against Vasiliy Lomachenko but lost via a seventh-round retirement. Between his first and second title attempts, Marriaga won the vacant NABO featherweight title.

== Professional boxing record ==
39 fights	31 wins	8 losses
By knockout	26	2
By decision	5	6

No.	Result	Record	Opponent	Type	Round, time	Date	Location	Notes
39	Loss	31–8	Eduardo Nunez	TKO	6 (10), 3:00	31 Aug 2024	Dignity Health Sports Park, Carson, California, U.S.	
38	Win	31–7	Andres Perez	UD	8	21 Jun 2024	Gimnasio Yorby Mendoza, Cartagena, Colombia	
37	Loss	30–7	Jono Carroll	UD	10	28 Mar 2023	Agenda Arena, Dubai, United Arab Emirates	
36	Loss	30–6	Michael Conlan	UD	10	6 Aug 2022	SSE Arena Belfast, Belfast, Northern Ireland	
35	Loss	30–5	Eduardo Ramirez	UD	10	5 Dec 2021	Staples Center, Los Angeles, California, U.S.	
34	Win	30–4	Jorge Garcia Jimenez	TKO	6 (10), 2:36	30 Apr 2021	FIT Center, Mexico City, Mexico	Won vacant WBC FECARBOX featherweight title
33	Loss	29–4	Joet Gonzalez	UD	10	12 Sep 2020	MGM Grand Conference Center, Paradise, Nevada, U.S.	For WBO International featherweight title
32	Win	29–3	Alfredo Mejia Vargas	KO	6 (8), 1:01	7 Dec 2019	Auditorio GNP Seguros, Puebla, Mexico	
31	Win	28–3	Ruben Cervera	RTD	3 (8), 3:00	11 May 2019	Convention Center, Tucson, Arizona, U.S.	
30	Win	27–3	Jose Estrella	KO	4 (10), 2:43	3 Nov 2018	Don Haskins Convention Center, El Paso, Texas, U.S.	
29	Win	26–3	Derlinson Buriel	KO	4 (10), 2:44	12 May 2018	Plaza de la Aduana, Cartagena, Colombia	
28	Loss	25–3	Vasiliy Lomachenko	RTD	7 (12), 3:00	5 Aug 2017	Microsoft Theater, Los Angeles, California, U.S.	For WBO junior lightweight title
27	Loss	25–2	Óscar Valdez	UD	12	22 Apr 2017	StubHub Center, Carson, California, U.S.	For WBO featherweight title
26	Win	25–1	Eduardo Montoya	KO	3 (12), 2:26	16 Dec 2016	Coliseo Bernardo Caraballo, Cartagena, Colombia	Retained WBO–NABO featherweight title
25	Win	24–1	Guy Robb	TKO	6 (10), 2:06	27 Aug 2016	Churchill County Fairgrounds, Fallon, Nevada, U.S.	Won vacant WBO–NABO featherweight title
24	Win	23–1	Adones Aguelo	UD	8	12 Mar 2016	Marriott Convention Center, Burbank, California, U.S.	
23	Win	22–1	Luis Zambrano	KO	3 (8), 1:15	18 Dec 2015	Parque de Canaporte, Cartagena, Colombia	
22	Win	21–1	Guillermo Avila	UD	8	7 Nov 2015	Thomas & Mack Center, Paradise, Nevada, U.S.	
21	Loss	20–1	Nicholas Walters	UD	12	13 Jun 2015	Hulu Theater, New York City, New York, U.S.	For WBA (Super) featherweight title
20	Win	20–0	Carlos Perez	TKO	3 (9), 1:03	19 Dec 2014	Coliseo Farid Arana Delgadillo, Magangue, Colombia	
19	Win	19–0	Christopher Martin	KO	6 (8), 2:30	1 Oct 2014	Barker Hangar, Santa Monica, California, U.S.	
18	Win	18–0	Marcos Cardenas	KO	8 (10), 2:25	17 May 2014	Coliseo Luis Yarzagaray Cogollo, Arjona, Colombia	
17	Win	17–0	Mario Antonio Macias	TKO	3 (10)	19 Oct 2013	Jose Cuervo Salon, Mexico City, Mexico	
16	Win	16–0	Jesus Galicia	UD	12	17 Aug 2013	Auditorio Plaza Condesa, Mexico City, Mexico	Retained WBC Continental Americas featherweight title
15	win	15–0	Iwier Henriquez	TKO	3 (10), 1:43	31 May 2013	Coliseo El Cangrejo, San Antero, Colombia	
14	Win	14–0	Yenrry Bermudez	KO	2 (10), 2:23	21 Dec 2012	Teledique Studios, Arjona, Colombia	
13	win	13–0	Elvis Garcia	KO	3 (8), 2:55	19 Oct 2012	Coliseo Bernardo Caraballo, Cartagena, Colombia	
12	Win	12–	Alejandro Delgado	TKO	9 (12), 0:51	14 Jul 2012	Foro Polanco, Mexico City, Mexico	Won vacant WBC Continental Americas featherweight title
11	Win	11–0	Josue Veraza	TKO	3 (8), 2:03	18 Nov 2011	Jose Cuervo Salon, Mexico City, Mexico	
10	Win	10–0	Benjamin Rivas	KO	1 (8), 2:25	25 Mar 2011	Coliseo Bernardo Caraballo, Cartagena, Colombia	
9	Win	9–0	Wegner Ortega	KO	4 (8), 1:55	5 Feb 2011	Coliseo Bernardo Caraballo, Cartagena, Colombia	
8	Win	8–0	Elvis Morelos	KO	4 (8), 2:18	27 Dec 2010	Coliseo Bernardo Caraballo, Cartagena, Colombia	
7	Win	7–0	Edinson Jimenez	UD	8	1 Oct 2010	Cancha El Monumental, Cartagena, Colombia	
6	Win	6–0	Rufino Valdez	KO	3 (8), 1:15	30 Jul 2010	Cancha El Monumental, Cartagena, Colombia	
5	Win	5–0	Victor Peralta	TKO	7 (8), 2:55	21 May 2010	Coliseo Bernardo Caraballo, Cartagena, Colombia	
4	Win	4–0	Ajenor Cuero	KO	1 (4), 1:56	12 Feb 2010	Campito de Bocagrande, Cartagena, Colombia	
3	Win	3–0	James Guevara	KO	2 (6), 1:16	17 Dec 2009	Coliseo Bernardo Caraballo, Cartagena, Colombia	
2	Win	2–0	Jose Gregorio Garcia	KO	3 (4), 2:21	2 Jul 2009	Discoteca El Escandalo, Cartagena, Colombia	
1	Win	1–0	Cesar Rodriguez	TKO	1 (4), 1:59	20 Jun 2009	Universidad del Norte, Barranquilla, Colombia	
