= Anthresh Lalit Lakra =

Indian boxer

Anthresh Lalit Lakra (born 22 October 1983) is an Indian boxer who fought at the 2008 Summer Olympics as a featherweight.

== Career ==
Lakra won the Commonwealth Championships 2005 against Stephen Smith. He missed the Commonwealth Games and the Asian Games 2006 but won silver at the 2006 Southeast Asian Games where he lost the final to Mehrullah Lassi.

At the World Military Games in 2007 in India, he beat North Korean Kim Won Il but lost to Shili Alaa.

At the World championships in 2007, he beat Bahodir Karimov and upset Shahin Imranov and qualified for Beijing before losing to Chinese Yang Li.

At the Olympics, he lost his first bout to Bahodirjon Sultonov 5:9.
