= Li Yang (boxer) =

Chinese boxer

Personal information
- Full name: 李 洋
- Nationality: China
- Born: February 19, 1982 (age 44) Xuzhou, Jiangsu
- Height: 1.65 m (5 ft 5 in)
- Weight: 57 kg (126 lb)

Sport
- Sport: Boxing
- Weight class: Featherweight
Medal record
World Amateur Championships
Bronze medal – third place	2007 Chicago, USA	Featherweight
Asian Championships
Bronze medal – third place	2007 Ulan Bator	Featherweight

Li Yang (Chinese: 李洋; pinyin: Lǐ Yáng) is a Chinese amateur boxer best known for winning a bronze medal at featherweight at the 2007 World Amateur Boxing Championships in Chicago.

He lost in the semifinal to Vasyl Lomachenko +13:13 (countback).

== World Amateur Championships ==
2005 (as a bantamweight)

- Defeated Fong Vou Wai (Hong Kong) 22–2
- Defeated Sodgerel Battur (Mongolia) 23–8
- Lost to Alexey Shaydulin (Bulgaria) walk-over

2007 (as a featherweight)

- Defeated Tomas Vano (Slovakia) RSCO 3
- Defeated Koba Pchakadze (Georgia) 15–2
- Defeated Carlos Zambrano (Peru) 13–4
- Defeated Anthresh Lalit Lakra (India) 17–6
- Lost to Vasyl Lomachenko (Ukraine) 13–13

== Olympic Games ==
2008 (as a featherweight)

- Defeated Robson Conceiçao (Brazil) 12–4
- Defeated Luis Porozo (Ecuador) 6–5
- Lost to Vasyl Lomachenko (Ukraine) 3-12
