= Nicholas Walters =

Jamaican boxer (born 1986)

Personal information
- Nickname: Axe Man
- Born: 4 January 1986 (age 40) Montego Bay, Jamaica
- Height: 5 ft 7 in (170 cm)
- Weight: Featherweight; Super featherweight

Boxing career
- Reach: 73 in (185 cm)
- Stance: Orthodox

Boxing record
- Total fights: 32
- Wins: 29
- Win by KO: 22
- Losses: 2
- Draws: 1
Medal record
Men's amateur boxing
Representing Jamaica
Central American and Caribbean Games
Bronze medal – third place	2006 Cartagena	Featherweight
Caribbean Championships
Gold medal – first place	2005 St. Thomas	Featherweight
Gold medal – first place	2006 Chaguaramas	Featherweight

Nicholas "Tha Axe Man" Walters (born 4 January 1986) is a Jamaican professional boxer. He held the WBA featherweight title from 2014 to 2015, having previously held the Regular version from 2012 to 2014.

== Personal life ==
Born in Montego Bay, Walters attended the Roehampton Primary and Anchovy High School. Walters is nicknamed "The Axe Man". He is the son of former boxer Job Walters. He began boxing at the age of ten and had his first professional fight at the age of 22 against Estaban Ramos of Panama.

== Amateur career ==
Walters had a successful amateur career prior to turning professional, winning the 2005 and 2006 Caribbean Championships gold medal at featherweight, and falling short at the 2007 World Championships at featherweight against Bashir Hassan and in 2008 at the America's Olympic Qualifier at featherweight against Miguel Marriaga. He later went on to defeat Marriaga as a professional.

== Professional career ==
Walters captured the WBA Fedelatin title in 2009, and successfully defended it four times. He won the vacant WBA (Regular) World Featherweight title on 8 December 2012, against Colombian Daulis Prescott during the annual KO Drugs Festival in Jamaica, via seventh-round knockout. Walters joined boxing promoter Top Rank in September 2013, signing a multi-year deal.

=== Walters vs. Donaire ===
Making good on his prediction of a knockout in either the 5th or 6th round, Walters defeated Nonito Donaire in a close competitive fight by technical knockout in the 6th round to capture the WBA World Featherweight Championship. He was promoted to Super Champion status in February 2015.

=== Walters vs. Marriaga ===
Walters originally weighed in at 127.4 pounds for his fight against Miguel Marriaga, who weighed in at 125.2 pounds. Walters was given 2 hours to drop to at least 126 pounds, the maximum limit of the Featherweight division. Walters did not succeed, being able only to drop to 127 pounds. Thus, he was stripped of the title. Walters defeated Marriaga by unanimous decision.

=== Walters vs. Sosa ===
He then moved to 130lbs, where he was held to a draw by Jason Sosa. Most observers thought Walters clearly won, and the result was controversial. Despite a dominant performance by Walters, one judge had Sosa winning the fight, 96–94, while the other two had it a draw, 95–95.

=== Walters vs. Lomachenko ===
Walters remained inactive for a year following this fight, before taking on Vasiliy Lomachenko in Las Vegas. Lomachenko, who was considered as one of the best pound-for-pound fighters in the world, dominated the fight before Walters quit in the seventh round.

== Professional boxing record ==
32 fights	29 wins	2 losses
By knockout	22	2
By decision	7	0
Draws	1	

No.	Result	Record	Opponent	Type	Round, time	Date	Location	Notes
32	Loss	29–2–1	Luis Torres Valenzuela	RTD	3 (10), 3:00	8 Mar 2025	Thunder Studios, Long Beach, US	
31	Win	29–1–1	Joseph Adorno	UD	10	27 Mar 2024	ProBox TV Events Center, Plant City, Florida, US	
30	Win	28–1–1	Reynaldo Esquivia	TKO	2 (8), 1:36	22 Nov 2023	Coliseo de Pescaito David Ruiz Ureche, Santa Marta, Colombia	
29	Win	27–1–1	Luis Diaz Marmol	UD	8	25 Feb 2023	Coliseo de Pescaito David Ruiz Ureche, Santa Marta, Colombia	
28	Loss	26–1–1	Vasiliy Lomachenko	RTD	7 (12), 3:00	26 Nov 2016	Cosmopolitan of Las Vegas, Paradise, Nevada, US	For WBO junior lightweight title
27	Draw	26–0–1	Jason Sosa	MD	10	19 Dec 2015	Turning Stone Resort Casino, Verona, New York, US	
26	Win	26–0	Miguel Marriaga	UD	12	13 Jun 2015	The Theater at Madison Square Garden, New York City, New York, US	WBA (Super) featherweight title at stake only for Marriaga, as Walters had missed weight
25	Win	25–0	Nonito Donaire	TKO	6 (12), 2:59	18 Oct 2014	StubHub Center, Carson, California, US	Won WBA (Super) featherweight title
24	Win	24–0	Vic Darchinyan	KO	5 (12), 2:22	31 May 2014	Cotai Arena, Macau, SAR	Retained WBA (Regular) featherweight title
23	Win	23–0	Alberto Garza	TKO	4 (12), 1:57	9 Nov 2013	American Bank Center, Corpus Christi, Texas, US	Retained WBA (Regular) featherweight title
22	Win	22–0	Daulis Prescott	TKO	7 (12), 0:35	8 Dec 2012	National Indoor Sports Complex, Kingston, Jamaica	Won vacant WBA (Regular) featherweight title
21	Win	21–0	Gustavo Sandoval	TKO	4 (10), 1:29	21 Jul 2012	Roberto Durán Arena, Panama City, Panama	
20	Win	20–0	Hector Javier Marquez	UD	10	31 Mar 2012	Hotel Meliá Panamá Canal, Colón, Panama	
19	Win	19–0	Irving Berry	TKO	6 (11), 1:35	22 Oct 2011	Roberto Durán Arena, Panama City, Panama	Retained WBA Fedelatin featherweight title
18	Win	18–0	Argel Salinas	TKO	2 (11), 2:46	16 Jun 2011	Karl Hendrickson Auditorium, Kingston, Jamaica	Retained WBA Fedelatin featherweight title
17	Win	17–0	Gonzalo Munguia	TKO	8 (11)	18 Dec 2010	Hotel Meliá Panamá Canal, Colón, Panama	Retained WBA Fedelatin featherweight title
16	Win	16–0	Julio Camano	TKO	4 (8), 2:02	16 Oct 2010	Arena Panamá Al Brown, Colón, Panama	
15	Win	15–0	Jose Miguel Payares	RTD	5 (11)	31 Jul 2010	Arena Panamá Al Brown, Colón, Panama	Retained WBA Fedelatin featherweight title
14	Win	14–0	Alexander Alonso	TKO	6 (6), 1:30	30 Apr 2010	Hotel Meliá Panamá Canal, Colón, Panama	
13	Win	13–0	Carlos Manuel Reyes	UD	11	18 Dec 2009	Karibe Convention Center, Port-au-Prince, Haiti	Won vacant WBA Fedelatin featherweight title
12	Win	12–0	Ernesto Vasquez Batioja	KO	6 (6), 2:23	8 Aug 2009	Gimnasio Yuyin Luzcando, Panama City, Panama	
11	Win	11–0	Leovigildo Siris	KO	1 (6), 1:36	28 May 2009	Hotel El Panamá, Panama City, Panama	
10	Win	10–0	Gilberto Armuelles	KO	1 (4), 1:35	28 Mar 2009	Gimnasio Escolar, David, Panama	
9	Win	9–0	Jose Fonseca	KO	4 (8), 1:49	28 Feb 2009	Hotel Meliá Panamá Canal, Colón, Panama	
8	Win	8–0	Julio Jacobo	TKO	3 (4)	14 Feb 2009	Gimnasio Escolar, David, Panama	
7	Win	7–0	Alejandro Corrales	UD	6	13 Dec 2008	Hotel Meliá Panamá Canal, Colón, Panama	
6	Win	6–0	Ovidio Mojica	TKO	4 (6), 0:43	5 Dec 2008	Sala de Eventos La Eskina, Panama City, Panama	
5	Win	5–0	Raul Miranda	KO	1 (4), 1:37	22 Nov 2008	Gimnasio del Club de Leones, Soná District, Panama	
4	Win	4–0	Javier Jimenez	TKO	4 (4)	30 Oct 2008	Figali Convention Center, Panama City, Panama	
3	Win	3–0	Armando Carpintero	KO	1 (4), 1:51	11 Sep 2008	Fantastic Casino, Panamá District, Panama	
2	Win	2–0	Luis Gonzalez	TKO	2 (4), 1:35	19 Aug 2008	Atlapa Convention Centre, Panama City, Panama	
1	Win	1–0	Esteban Ramos	UD	4	2 Aug 2008	Gimnasio Yuyin Luzcando, Panama City, Panama	

Sporting positions
Regional boxing titles
Vacant Title last held by Feider Viloria	WBA Fedelatin featherweight champion 18 December 2009 – July 2012; Vacated	Vacant Title next held by Claudio Marrero
World boxing titles
Vacant Title last held by Celestino Caballero	WBA featherweight champion Regular title 8 December 2012 – 18 October 2014	Vacant Title next held by Jesús Cuellar
Preceded by Nonito Donaire as Undisputed champion	WBA featherweight champion 18 October 2014 – 12 June 2015; Super title from 21 February 2015; Stripped	Vacant Title next held by Léo Santa Cruz
