= Roberto Navarro (boxer) =

Dominican Republic boxer (born 1988)

Roberto Navarro Gonzalez (born April 14, 1988) is a boxer from the Dominican Republic. He competed in the 2008 Summer Olympics in the featherweight division. He lost via tiebreaker (after a 3–3 draw) in the first round to Luis Enrique Porozo of Ecuador.
