= Raynell Williams =

American boxer (born 1989)

Personal information
- Full name: Raynell Williams
- Nationality: United States
- Born: February 4, 1989 (age 37) Cleveland, Ohio, U.S.
- Height: 1.70 m (5 ft 7 in)
- Weight: 57 kg (126 lb)

Sport
- Sport: Boxing
- Weight class: Featherweight
- Club: S.A.B.A.

Raynell Williams (born February 4, 1989, in Cleveland, Ohio) is an American professional boxer who as an amateur, won several national championships and represented team USA at the 2008 Summer Olympics.

== Amateur career ==
Southpaw counterpuncher Williams who hails from Ohio started boxing in 2001. He won the silver medal at the National Golden Gloves 2007 after losing to aggressive 16-year-old Hylon Williams (2–3). At the US championships in June, however, he bested the other Williams (31–21) in the semifinals and Rico Ramos (16–9), in finals.

At the US Olympic trials he edged out his nemesis Hylon Williams two out of three in close bouts (24–22), (16–20) and (17–16).

At the world championships 2007 he upset Olympian Khedafi Djelkhir of France and another fighter to qualify for Beijing but was defeated by Russian Albert Selimov.

At the Olympics 2008 he lost the rematch with Djelkhir.

At the 2012 Olympic Trials he lost in the finals to Jose Ramírez 21–16.

=== World Championships results ===
2007 World Championships

- Defeated Khedafi Djelkhir (France) 28–18
- Defeated Maksat Ospanov (Kazakhstan) 28–9
- Defeated Azat Hovhanesyan (Armenia) RSCO 3
- Lost to Albert Selimov (Russia) 8–25

=== Olympic Games results ===
2008 Summer Olympics

- Defeated Alessio di Savino (Italy) 9:1
- Lost to Khedafi Djelkhir (France) 7:9

=== Professional career ===
He signed professional with boxing advisor Al Haymon in the summer of 2013 and made his professional debut on July 5, 2013, defeating Dwight Ellis via TKO in the first round. He ran his record to 12–0, with 6 knockouts, before facing fellow undefeated fighter Joshua Zuniga in December 2017. Zuniga knocked Williams out in round 4 of a scheduled 8-rounder, and as of 2019 Williams has not fought since.
