= Alessio di Savino =

Italian boxer (born 1984)

Personal information
- Full name: Alessio di Savino
- Nationality: Italy
- Born: May 22, 1984 (age 42) Roma
- Height: 1.70 m (5 ft 7 in)
- Weight: 57 kg (126 lb)

Sport
- Sport: Boxing
- Weight class: Featherweight
Medal record
Representing Italy
Men's amateur boxing
Mediterranean Games
Bronze medal – third place	2009 Pescara	57 kg
World Military Championships
Bronze medal – third place	2014 Almaty	56 kg

Alessio di Savino (born May 22, 1984) is an Italian former amateur boxer. He competed at the 2008 Summer Olympics, the 2009 World Championships and three editions of the European Championships (2008, 2010 and 2013).

At the 2008 Olympics, he lost his debut to Raynell Williams in the men's featherweight division (– 57 kg).
