= Luis Porozo =

Ecuadorian boxer

Personal information
- Born: 30 June 1990 (age 36) Santo Domingo, Ecuador
- Height: 5 ft 8 1/2 in (174 cm)
- Weight: Super featherweight

Boxing career
- Reach: 72 in (183 cm)
- Stance: Orthodox

Boxing record
- Total fights: 23
- Wins: 16
- Win by KO: 9
- Losses: 7

Luis Enrique Porozo Mina (born June 30, 1990) is an Ecuadorian professional boxer. As an amateur he qualified in the men's featherweight division for the 2008 Summer Olympics as a seventeen-year-old.

Porozo, from Pichincha, came in second at his qualifier when he beat Roberto Navarro. He lost the meaningless final to Idel Torriente but qualified anyway. In his first Olympic fight he beat Navarro in a rematch 3:3+, jury decision.
