= Turkey at the 2004 Summer Olympics =

- IOC code: TUR
- NOC: Turkish National Olympic Committee
- Website: olimpiyat.org.tr (in English and Turkish)

in Athens
- Competitors: 65 in 10 sports
- Flag bearer: Ali Enver Adakan
- Medals Ranked 22nd: Gold 3 Silver 3 Bronze 4 Total 10

Summer Olympics appearances (overview)
- 1908; 1912; 1920; 1924; 1928; 1932; 1936; 1948; 1952; 1956; 1960; 1964; 1968; 1972; 1976; 1980; 1984; 1988; 1992; 1996; 2000; 2004; 2008; 2012; 2016; 2020; 2024

Other related appearances
- 1906 Intercalated Games

Turkey competed at the 2004 Summer Olympics in Athens, Greece, from 13 to 29 August 2004. Turkish athletes have competed at every Summer Olympic Games since its debut in 1908. Turkey did not attend the 1920 Summer Olympics in Antwerp, the 1932 Summer Olympics in Los Angeles at the period of worldwide Great Depression, and the 1980 Summer Olympics in Moscow because of its support for the United States boycott. The Turkish Olympic Committee (Turkish: Türkiye Milli Olimpiyat Komitesi, TMOK) sent the nation's largest delegation to the Games. A total of 65 athletes, 45 men and 20 women, competed in 10 sports. There was only a single competitor in shooting and taekwondo.

The Turkish team featured two defending Olympic champions from Sydney: Greco-Roman wrestler Hamza Yerlikaya, and weightlifter and world record holder Halil Mutlu, who competed at his fourth Olympic Games as the most sophisticated athlete of the team. Among the Turkish athletes, three of them were born in the former Soviet Union (two of which were previously played for the Unified Team at the 1992 Summer Olympics in Barcelona), namely archer Natalia Nasaridze, long distance runner Ebru Kavaklıoğlu, and Belarusian-born heptathlete Anzhela Atroshchenko. Finn sailor Ali Enver Adakan, who achieved a top ten finish in Sydney four years earlier, was appointed by the committee to carry the Turkish flag in the opening ceremony.

Turkey left Athens with a total of eleven Olympic medals (three golds, four silver, and four bronze), being considered its most successful Olympics with respect to the overall medal count since 1948. Nearly half of these medals were awarded to the athletes in weightlifting, including a third straight defense for Halil Mutlu in the men's bantamweight class on his final Olympic bid.

== Medalists ==
Medal	Name	Sport	Event	Date
Gold	Nurcan Taylan	Weightlifting	Women's 48 kg	August 14
Gold	Halil Mutlu	Weightlifting	Men's 56 kg	August 16
Gold	Taner Sağır	Weightlifting	Men's 77 kg	August 19
Silver	Şeref Eroğlu	Wrestling	Men's Greco-Roman 66 kg	August 25
Silver	Bahri Tanrıkulu	Taekwondo	Men's 80 kg	August 27
Silver	Atagün Yalçınkaya	Boxing	Light flyweight	August 29
Bronze	Sedat Artuç	Weightlifting	Men's 56 kg	August 16
Bronze	Reyhan Arabacıoğlu	Weightlifting	Men's 77 kg	August 19
Bronze	Mehmet Özal	Wrestling	Men's Greco-Roman 96 kg	August 25
Bronze	Aydin Polatci	Wrestling	Men's freestyle 120 kg	August 27

Medals by sport
Sport	1st place, gold medalist(s)	2nd place, silver medalist(s)	3rd place, bronze medalist(s)	Total
Weightlifting	3	0	2	5
Wrestling	0	1	2	3
Boxing	0	1	0	1
Taekwondo	0	1	0	1
Total	3	3	4	10

== Archery ==
Four Turkish archers (one man and three women) qualified each for the men's and women's individual archery, and a spot for the women's team.

Athlete	Event	Ranking round		Round of 64	Round of 32	Round of 16	Quarterfinals	Semifinals	Final / BM	
Athlete	Event	Score	Seed	Opposition Score	Opposition Score	Opposition Score	Opposition Score	Opposition Score	Opposition Score	Rank
Hasan Orbay	Men's individual	647	34	Godfrey (GBR); L 155–157	Did not advance					
Damla Günay	Women's individual	620	42	Hitzler (GER); L 152–163	Did not advance					
Natalia Nasaridze	Women's individual	639	16	Piuva (FIN); L 133–136	Did not advance					
Zekiye Keskin Şatır	Women's individual	631	25	Nulle (GER); W 135 (10)–135 (7)	Psarra (GRE); L 161–163	Did not advance				
Damla Günay; Natalia Nasaridze; Zekiye Keskin Şatır	Women's team	1890	7	—N/a		Ukraine; L 234–244	Did not advance			

== Athletics ==
Turkish athletes have so far achieved qualifying standards in the following athletics events (up to a maximum of 3 athletes in each event at the 'A' Standard, and 1 at the 'B' Standard).

Key

- Note–Ranks given for track events are within the athlete's heat only
- Q = Qualified for the next round
- q = Qualified for the next round as a fastest loser or, in field events, by position without achieving the qualifying target
- NR = National record
- N/A = Round not applicable for the event
- Bye = Athlete not required to compete in round

Men
Track & road events

Athlete	Event	Heat		Semifinal		Final	
Athlete	Event	Result	Rank	Result	Rank	Result	Rank
Selahattin Çobanoğlu	800 m	1:47.83	6	Did not advance			

Field events

Athlete	Event	Qualification		Final	
Athlete	Event	Distance	Position	Distance	Position
Eşref Apak	Hammer throw	76.74	9 q	79.51	2 (without medal)*
Ercüment Olgundeniz	Discus throw	58.17	26	Did not advance	
Berk Tuna	Triple jump	NM	—	Did not advance	

*Eşref Apak originally took fourth place. After a series of doping-related disqualifications he moved up to second place after the gold medalist Koji Murofushi of Japan. However as he had been suspended from the sport for doping offenses since 2004, the IOC decided not to award the silver and bronze medals.

Women
Track & road events

Athlete	Event	Heat		Semifinal		Final	
Athlete	Event	Result	Rank	Result	Rank	Result	Rank
Elvan Abeylegesse	1500 m	4:06.42	5 Q	4:07.10	4 Q	4:00.67	8
Elvan Abeylegesse	5000 m	14:54.80	2 Q	—N/a		15:12.64	15
Yeliz Ay	20 km walk	—N/a				1:36:02	33
Ebru Kavaklıoğlu	5000 m	15:52.39	14	—N/a		Did not advance	
Lale Öztürk	Marathon	—N/a				DNF	
Tezeta Sürekli	5000 m	15:26.64	10	—N/a		Did not advance	
Binnaz Uslu	800 m	2:03.46	6	Did not advance			

Field events

Athlete	Event	Qualification		Final	
Athlete	Event	Distance	Position	Distance	Position
Filiz Kadoğan	Shot put	15.20	33	Did not advance	
Candeğer Kılınçer Oğuz	High jump	1.89	18	Did not advance	

Combined events – Heptathlon

Athlete	Event	100H	HJ	SP	200 m	LJ	JT	800 m	Final	Rank
Anzhela Atroshchenko	Result	14.10	1.64	12.29	25.11	DNS	—	—	DNF	
Anzhela Atroshchenko	Points	964	783	680	877	0	—	—	DNF	

== Boxing ==
Turkey sent eight boxers to the Olympics in Athens.

Athlete	Event	Round of 32	Round of 16	Quarterfinals	Semifinals	Final	
Athlete	Event	Opposition Result	Opposition Result	Opposition Result	Opposition Result	Opposition Result	Rank
Atagün Yalçınkaya	Light flyweight	Katongole (UGA); W 22–7	Abiyev (AZE); W 23–20	Pinto (ITA); W 33–24	Kazakov (RUS); W 26–20	Bartelemí (CUB); L 16–21	2nd place, silver medalist(s)
Sedat Taşcı	Featherweight	Jo S-H (KOR); L 28–37	Did not advance				
Selçuk Aydın	Lightweight	Stilianov (BUL); L 11–20	Did not advance				
Mustafa Karagöllü	Light welterweight	Vijender (IND); W 25–20	Gheorghe (ROM); L 19–28	Did not advance			
Bülent Ulusoy	Welterweight	Chibuye (ZAM); W 45–32	Husanov (UZB); L 9–23	Did not advance			
Serdar Üstüner	Middleweight	Abdurahmanov (UZB); L 16–34	Did not advance				
İhsan Yıldırım Tarhan	Light heavyweight	Pownceby (NZL); W RSC	Shumenov (KAZ); W 27–19	Haydarov (UZB); L 11–16	Did not advance		

== Judo ==
Three Turkish judoka (two men and one woman) qualified for the 2004 Summer Olympics.

Men

Athlete	Event	Round of 32	Round of 16	Quarterfinals	Semifinals	Repechage 1	Repechage 2	Repechage 3	Final / BM	
Athlete	Event	Opposition Result	Opposition Result	Opposition Result	Opposition Result	Opposition Result	Opposition Result	Opposition Result	Opposition Result	Rank
Bektaş Demirel	−66 kg	Benboudaoud (FRA); W 1100–0021	Georgiev (BUL); L 0001–1020	Did not advance		Margoshvili (GEO); L 0010–0120	Did not advance			
Selim Tataroğlu	+100 kg	Gujejiani (GEO); W 1011–0000	Miran (IRI); L 0010–1000	Did not advance		Brutus (HAI); W 1000–0000	Pepic (AUS); W 0110–0010	Pertelson (EST); L 0100–0200	Did not advance	

Women

Athlete	Event	Round of 32	Round of 16	Quarterfinals	Semifinals	Repechage 1	Repechage 2	Repechage 3	Final / BM	
Athlete	Event	Opposition Result	Opposition Result	Opposition Result	Opposition Result	Opposition Result	Opposition Result	Opposition Result	Opposition Result	Rank
Neşe Şensoy Yıldız	−48 kg	Ri K-O (PRK); W 0111–0021	Ye G-R (KOR); L 0001–0010	Did not advance						

== Sailing ==
Turkish sailors have qualified one boat for each of the following events.

Men

Athlete	Event	Race											Net points	Final rank
Athlete	Event	1	2	3	4	5	6	7	8	9	10	M*	Net points	Final rank
Ertuğrul İçingir	Mistral	7	17	8	6	4	16	3	~~OCS~~	19	12	13	105	11
Ali Enver Adakan	Finn	2	15	8	10	22	11	10	21	16	~~24~~	9	124	16
Selim Kakış; Hasan Kaan Özgönenç	470	25	18	15	24	25	6	~~DSQ~~	24	19	5	13	174	24

Open

Athlete	Event	Race											Net points	Final rank
Athlete	Event	1	2	3	4	5	6	7	8	9	10	M*	Net points	Final rank
Kemal Muslubaş	Laser	11	20	18	~~OCS~~	28	31	16	35	26	28	DNF	256	33

M = Medal race; OCS = On course side of the starting line; DSQ = Disqualified; DNF = Did not finish; DNS= Did not start; RDG = Redress given

== Shooting ==
Turkey has qualified a single shooter.

Men

Athlete	Event	Qualification		Final	
Athlete	Event	Points	Rank	Points	Rank
Oğuzhan Tüzün	Trap	115	21	Did not advance	

== Swimming ==
Turkish swimmers earned qualifying standards in the following events (up to a maximum of 2 swimmers in each event at the A-standard time, and 1 at the B-standard time):

Men

Athlete	Event	Heat		Semifinal		Final	
Athlete	Event	Time	Rank	Time	Rank	Time	Rank
Derya Büyükuncu	100 m backstroke	56.34	26	Did not advance			
Derya Büyükuncu	200 m backstroke	2:02.69	22	Did not advance			
Aytekin Mindan	200 m freestyle	1:55.65	52	Did not advance			
Aytekin Mindan	400 m freestyle	4:06.85	41	—N/a		Did not advance	
Orel Oral	200 m individual medley	2:08.84	=45	Did not advance			
Kaan Tayla	50 m freestyle	23.26	39	Did not advance			
Kaan Tayla	100 m freestyle	51.52	42	Did not advance			
Onur Uras	100 m butterfly	56.37	49	Did not advance			

Women

Athlete	Event	Heat		Semifinal		Final	
Athlete	Event	Time	Rank	Time	Rank	Time	Rank
İlkay Dikmen	100 m breaststroke	1:11.69	26	Did not advance			
İlkay Dikmen	200 m breaststroke	2:32.69	19	Did not advance			
Şadan Derya Erke	100 m backstroke	1:05.38	34	Did not advance			
Şadan Derya Erke	200 m backstroke	2:17.29	=21	Did not advance			
Gülşah Günenç	100 m butterfly	1:04.30	35	Did not advance			
Gülşah Günenç	200 m butterfly	2:20.17	31	Did not advance			
Özlem Yasemin Taşkın	400 m freestyle	4:24.08	35	—N/a		Did not advance	

== Taekwondo ==
One Turkish taekwondo jin qualified to compete in the men's 80 kg class.

Athlete	Event	Round of 16	Quarterfinals	Semifinals	Repechage 1	Repechage 2	Final / BM	
Athlete	Event	Opposition Result	Opposition Result	Opposition Result	Opposition Result	Opposition Result	Opposition Result	Rank
Bahri Tanrıkulu	Men's −80 kg	Geisler (PHI); W 9–9 SUP	Hamdouni (TUN); W 6–4	Ahmadov (AZE); W 6–6 SUP	Bye		López (USA); L 0–3	2nd place, silver medalist(s)

== Weightlifting ==
Nine Turkish weightlifters qualified for the following events:

Men

Athlete	Event	Snatch		Clean & Jerk		Total	Rank
Athlete	Event	Result	Rank	Result	Rank	Total	Rank
Sedat Artuç	−56 kg	125	=4	155	3	280	3rd place, bronze medalist(s)
Halil Mutlu	−56 kg	135	1	160	1	295	1st place, gold medalist(s)
Reyhan Arabacıoğlu	−77 kg	165	3	195	=7	360	3rd place, bronze medalist(s)
Taner Sağır	−77 kg	172.5 OR	=1	202.5 OR	1	375 OR	1st place, gold medalist(s)
İzzet İnce	−85 kg	~~175~~	DNF	—	—	—	DNF
Hakan Yılmaz	−94 kg	175	=7	215	=5	390	6

Women

Athlete	Event	Snatch		Clean & Jerk		Total	Rank
Athlete	Event	Result	Rank	Result	Rank	Total	Rank
Nurcan Taylan	−48 kg	97.5 WR	1	112.5	1	210 WR	1st place, gold medalist(s)
Aylin Daşdelen	−58 kg	100	4	125	4	225	4
Sibel Şimşek	−69 kg	~~11575~~	DNF	—	—	—	DNF

== Wrestling ==
Key:

- VT - Victory by Fall.
- PP - Decision by Points - the loser with technical points.
- PO - Decision by Points - the loser without technical points.

Men's freestyle

Athlete	Event	Elimination Pool				Quarterfinal	Semifinal	Final / BM	
Athlete	Event	Opposition Result	Opposition Result	Opposition Result	Rank	Opposition Result	Opposition Result	Opposition Result	Rank
Harun Doğan	−55 kg	Berberyan (ARM); L 1–3 ^{PP}	Kardanov (GRE); L 0–4 ^{ST}	O S-N (PRK); L 0–5 ^{VB}	4	Did not advance			20
Tevfik Odabaşı	−60 kg	Umakhanov (RUS); L 1–3 ^{PP}	Sissaouri (CAN); L 1–3 ^{PP}	—N/a	3	Did not advance			15
Ömer Çubukçu	−66 kg	Fernyák (SVK); W 3–1 ^{PP}	Hatos (HUN); W 3–1 ^{PP}	—N/a	1 Q	Murtazaliev (RUS); L 0–3 ^{PO}	Did not advance		7
Gökhan Yavaşer	−84 kg	Danko (UKR); L 0–3 ^{PO}	Aghaev (ARM); W 5–0 ^{EV}	—N/a	2	Did not advance			15
Fatih Çakıroğlu	−96 kg	Enkhtuyaa (MGL); W 5–0 ^{VT}	Shemarov (BLR); L 1–3 ^{PP}	—N/a	2	Did not advance			9
Aydın Polatçı	−120 kg	Chintoan (ROM); W 4–0 ^{ST}	Thiele (GER); W 3–1 ^{PP}	—N/a	1 Q	Rodríguez (CUB); W 3–1 ^{PP}	Taymazov (UZB); L 0–3 ^{PO}	Mutalimov (KAZ); W 3–1 ^{PP}	3rd place, bronze medalist(s)

Men's Greco-Roman

Athlete	Event	Elimination Pool				Quarterfinal	Semifinal	Final / BM	
Athlete	Event	Opposition Result	Opposition Result	Opposition Result	Rank	Opposition Result	Opposition Result	Opposition Result	Rank
Ercan Yıldız	−55 kg	Chochua (GEO); L 1–3 ^{PP}	Adomaitis (LTU); W 3–1 ^{PP}	—N/a	2	Did not advance			12
Şeref Tüfenk	−60 kg	Gikas (GRE); W 3–0 ^{PO}	Ashkani (IRI); W 3–1 ^{PP}	Monzón (CUB); L 0–3 ^{PO}	2	Did not advance			8
Şeref Eroğlu	−66 kg	Izquierdo (COL); W 4–0 ^{ST}	Kvirkvelia (GEO); W 5–0 ^{EV}	Vardanyan (UKR); W 3–0 ^{PO}	1 Q	Bye	Manukyan (KAZ); W 5–0 ^{VT}	Mansurov (AZE); L 1–3 ^{PP}	2nd place, silver medalist(s)
Hamza Yerlikaya	−84 kg	Daragan (UKR); W 3–1 ^{PP}	Metodiev (BUL); W 5–0 ^{VB}	Thomberg (EST); W 3–0 ^{PO}	1 Q	Bye	Abrahamian (SWE); L 0–3 ^{PO}	Makaranka (BLR); L 1–3 ^{PP}	4
Mehmet Özal	−96 kg	Cheglakov (UZB); W 3–0 ^{PO}	Kostins (LAT); W 3–0 ^{PO}	—N/a	1 Q	Peña (CUB); W 3–1 ^{PP}	Gaber (EGY); L 0–4 ^{ST}	Hashemzadeh (IRI); W 3–1 ^{PP}	3rd place, bronze medalist(s)
Yekta Yılmaz Gül	−120 kg	Evseitchik (ISR); W 3–0 ^{PO}	López (CUB); L 0–3 ^{PO}	—N/a	2	Did not advance			13

== See also ==
- Turkey at the 2004 Summer Paralympics
- Turkey at the 2005 Mediterranean Games
