= Boxing at the 2004 Summer Olympics – Light flyweight =

Boxing competitions

Light flyweight boxing at the Games of the XXVIII Olympiad
- Venue: Peristeri Olympic Boxing Hall
- Date: 18–29 August 2004
- Competitors: 29 from 29 nations

Medalists
1st place, gold medalist(s)		Yan Bartelemí	Cuba
2nd place, silver medalist(s)		Atagün Yalçınkaya	Turkey
3rd place, bronze medalist(s)		Zou Shiming	China
3rd place, bronze medalist(s)		Sergey Kazakov	Russia

The light flyweight boxing competition at the 2004 Summer Olympics in Athens was held from 18 to 29 August at Peristeri Olympic Boxing Hall. This is limited to those boxers weighing less than 48 kilograms.

== Competition format ==
Like all Olympic boxing events, the competition was a straight single-elimination tournament. This event consisted of 29 boxers who have qualified for the competition through various tournaments held in 2003 and 2004. The competition began with a preliminary round on 18 August, where the number of competitors was reduced to 16, and concluded with the final on 29 August. As there were fewer than 32 boxers in the competition, a number of boxers received a bye through the preliminary round. Both semi-final losers were awarded bronze medals.

All bouts consisted of four rounds of two minutes each, with one-minute breaks between rounds. Punches scored only if the white area on the front of the glove made full contact with the front of the head or torso of the opponent. Five judges scored each bout; three of the judges had to signal a scoring punch within one second for the punch to score. The winner of the bout was the boxer who scored the most valid punches by the end of the bout.

== Schedule ==
All times are Greece Standard Time (UTC+2)

Date	Time	Round
Wednesday, 18 August 2004	13:30 & 19:30	Round of 32
Saturday, 21 August 2004	19:30	Round of 16
Tuesday, 24 August 2004	19:30	Quarterfinals
Friday, 27 August 2004	19:30	Semifinals
Sunday, 29 August 2004	13:30	Final

== Qualifying athletes ==
Athlete	Country
Peter Wakefield	Australia
Joseph Jermia	Namibia
Raúl Castañeda	Mexico
Sergey Kazakov	Russia
Patricio Calero	Ecuador
Carlos Tamara	Colombia
Redouane Bouchtouk	Morocco
Effiong Okon	Nigeria
Alfonso Pinto	Italy
Atagün Yalçınkaya	Turkey
Jolly Katongole	Uganda
Pál Bedák	Hungary
Jeyhun Abiyev	Azerbaijan
Rau'shee Warren	United States
Zou Shiming	China
Endalkachew Kebede	Ethiopia
Toshiyuki Igarashi	Japan
Najah Ali	Iraq
Kwak Hyok-Ju	North Korea
Aleksan Nalbandyan	Armenia
Redouane Asloum	France
Hong Moo-Won	South Korea
Lalaina Rabenarivo	Madagascar
Sherali Dostiev	Tajikistan
Harry Tañamor	Philippines
Yan Bartelemí	Cuba
Miguel Ángel Miranda	Venezuela
Suban Pannon	Thailand
Salim Salimov	Bulgaria

== Results ==
Round of 32
Sergey Kazakov (RUS)	20
Patricio Calero (ECU)	8
Carlos Tamara (COL)	48
Redouane Bouchtouk (MAR)	25
Effiong Okon (NGR)
Alfonso Pinto (ITA)	RSC
Atagün Yalçınkaya (TUR)	22
Jolly Katongole (UGA)	7
Pál Bedák (HUN)	8
Jeyhun Abiyev (AZE)	23
Rau'shee Warren (USA)	9
Zou Shiming (CHN)	22
Endalkachew Kebede (ETH)	26
Toshiyuki Igarashi (JPN)	21
Najah Ali (IRQ)	21
Kwak Hyok-ju (PRK)	7
Aleksan Nalbandyan (ARM)	27
Rédouane Asloum (FRA)	20
Hong Moo-Won (KOR)	RSC
Lalaina Rabenarivo (MAD)
Sherali Dostiev (TJK)	12
Harry Tañamor (PHI)	17
Yan Bartelemí (CUB)	RSC
Miguel Ángel Miranda (VEN)
Suban Pannon (THA)	26
Salim Salimov (BUL)	14

Round of 16
Peter Wakefield (AUS)	20
Joseph Jermia (NAM)	29
Raúl Castañeda (MEX)	16
Sergey Kazakov (RUS)	41
Carlos Tamara (COL)	35
Alfonso Pinto (ITA)	49
Atagün Yalçınkaya (TUR)	23
Jeyhun Abiyev (AZE)	20
Zou Shiming (CHN)	31
Endalkachew Kebede (ETH)	8
Najah Ali (IRQ)	11
Aleksan Nalbandyan (ARM)	24
Hong Moo-Won (KOR)	45
Harry Tañamor (PHI)	25
Yan Bartelemí (CUB)	23
Suban Pannon (THA)	14

Quarterfinals
Joseph Jermia (NAM)	11
Sergey Kazakov (RUS)	18
Alfonso Pinto (ITA)	24
Atagün Yalçınkaya (TUR)	33
Zou Shiming (CHN)	20
Aleksan Nalbandyan (ARM)	12
Hong Moo-Won (KOR)	11
Yan Bartelemí (CUB)	30

Semifinals
Sergey Kazakov (RUS)	20
Atagün Yalçınkaya (TUR)	26
Zou Shiming (CHN)	17
Yan Bartelemí (CUB)	29

Final
Atagün Yalçınkaya (TUR)	16
Yan Bartelemí (CUB)	21

Notes

- Najah Salah Ali (IRQ) received a wild card from the IOC.
- Toshiyuki Igarashi (JPN) replaced Noman Karim (PAK) as a lucky loser, because the Pakistani fighter dropped "due to technical reasons".
