= Boxing at the 2006 Asian Games – Men's 48 kg =

Boxing competitions

Men's 48 kg at the 2006 Asian Games
- Venue: Aspire Hall 5
- Date: 2–13 December 2006
- Competitors: 18 from 18 nations

Medalists
gold medal	Zou Shiming	China
silver medal	Suban Pannon	Thailand
bronze medal	Godfrey Castro	Philippines
bronze medal	Hong Moo-won	South Korea

The men's light flyweight (48 kilograms) event at the 2006 Asian Games took place from 2 to 13 December 2006 at Aspire Hall 5, Doha, Qatar.

== Schedule ==
All times are Arabia Standard Time (UTC+03:00)

Date	Time	Event
Saturday, 2 December 2006	14:00	Qualification
Monday, 4 December 2006	14:00	Preliminary
Friday, 8 December 2006	14:00	Quarterfinals
Monday, 11 December 2006	14:00	Semifinals
Wednesday, 13 December 2006	14:00	Final

== Results ==
Legend

- RSC — Won by referee stop contest
- RSCO — Won by referee stop contest outscored

=== Final ===
Final
Suban Pannon (THA)
Zou Shiming (CHN)	RSCO

=== Top half ===
Qualification

Preliminary
Godfrey Castro (PHI)	RSCO
Mohd Zamzai Azizi (MAS)
Yeferdson Ramos (TLS)	16
Ali Al-Ahmary (KSA)	32
Ro Sok (PRK)	21
Suban Pannon (THA)	30
Najah Salah (IRQ)	33
Jigjidiin Otgonbayar (MGL)	8

Quarterfinals
Godfrey Castro (PHI)	RSCO
Ali Al-Ahmary (KSA)
Suban Pannon (THA)	30
Najah Salah (IRQ)	21

Semifinals
Godfrey Castro (PHI)
Suban Pannon (THA)	RSCO

=== Bottom half ===
Qualification
Rafikjon Sultonov (UZB)	RSCO
Nguyễn Văn An (VIE)
Muhammad Nisar (PAK)	19
Hong Moo-won (KOR)	33

Preliminary
Sanjay Kisan Kolte (IND)	RSC
Sou Weng Meng (MAC)
Zou Shiming (CHN)	16
Sherali Dostiev (TJK)	10
Sadegh Farajzadeh (IRI)	19
Amjad Aouda (SYR)	32
Rafikjon Sultonov (UZB)	21
Hong Moo-won (KOR)	35

Quarterfinals
Sanjay Kisan Kolte (IND)
Zou Shiming (CHN)	RSCO
Amjad Aouda (SYR)	24
Hong Moo-won (KOR)	33

Semifinals
Zou Shiming (CHN)	17
Hong Moo-won (KOR)	9
