= 1st AIBA European 2004 Olympic Qualifying Tournament =

The 1st AIBA European 2004 Olympic Qualifying Tournament was held in Plovdiv, Bulgaria from March 30 to April 4, 2004 during the annual Strandjata Boxing Tournament. It was the first chance for amateur boxers from Europe to qualify for the 2004 Summer Olympics after the European Championships in Pula, Croatia. The number one and two in six weight divisions earned a ticket for the Olympic Tournament in Athens, Greece.

== Medal winners ==
Event	Gold	Silver	Bronze
Light Flyweight (– 48 kilograms)	Aleksan Nalbandyan (ARM)	Redouane Asloum (FRA)	Sergey Żmajlik (BLR) Veli Mumin (MKD)
Bantamweight (– 54 kilograms)	Zsolt Bedák (HUN)	Maksym Tretyak (UKR)	Afanasi Poskachin (ARM) SERDAR AVCİ (TUR)
Lightweight (– 60 kilograms)	Amir Khan (GBR)	Rovshan Huseynov (AZE)	Mariusz Koperski (POL) Adrian Alexandru (ROU)
Welterweight (– 69 kilograms)	Vilmos Balog (HUN)	Viktor Polyakov (UKR)	Bülent Ulusoy (TUR) Gracza Hovhannisyan (ARM)
Light Heavyweight (– 81 kilograms)	İhsan Yıldırım Tarhan (TUR)	Clemente Russo (ITA)	Tervel Pulev (BUL) Daugirdas Semiotas (LTU)
Super Heavyweight (+ 91 kilograms)	Sebastian Köber (GER)	Aliaksandr Apanasionak (BLR)	Mariusz Wach (POL) Milan Vasiljević (SCG)

== Qualified ==
=== Light Flyweight (– 48 kg) ===
- Aleksan Nalbandyan (ARM)
- Redouane Asloum (FRA)

=== Bantamweight (– 54 kg) ===
- Zsolt Bedák (HUN)
- Maksym Tretyak (UKR)

=== Lightweight (– 60 kg) ===
- Amir Khan (GBR)
- Rovshan Huseynov (AZE)

=== Welterweight (– 69 kg) ===
- Vilmos Balog (HUN)
- Viktor Polyakov (UKR)

=== Light Heavyweight (– 81 kg) ===
- İhsan Yıldırım Tarhan (TUR)
- Clemente Russo (ITA)

=== Super Heavyweight (+ 91 kg) ===
- Sebastian Köber (GER)
- Aliaksandr Apanasionak (BLR)

== See also ==
- 2004 European Amateur Boxing Championships
- 2nd AIBA European 2004 Olympic Qualifying Tournament
- 3rd AIBA European 2004 Olympic Qualifying Tournament
- 4th AIBA European 2004 Olympic Qualifying Tournament
