= Armenia at the 2004 Summer Olympics =

- IOC code: ARM
- NOC: National Olympic Committee of Armenia
- Website: www.armnoc.am (in Armenian)

in Athens
- Competitors: 18 in 8 sports
- Flag bearer: Albert Azaryan
- Medals: Gold 0 Silver 0 Bronze 0 Total 0

Summer Olympics appearances (overview)
- 1996; 2000; 2004; 2008; 2012; 2016; 2020; 2024

Other related appearances
- Russian Empire (1900–1912); Soviet Union (1952–1988); Unified Team (1992)

Armenia competed at the 2004 Summer Olympics in Athens, Greece from 13 to 29 August 2004.

== Athletics ==
Armenian athletes have so far achieved qualifying standards in the following athletics events (up to a maximum of 3 athletes in each event at the 'A' Standard, and 1 at the 'B' Standard).

Key

- Note–Ranks given for track events are within the athlete's heat only
- Q = Qualified for the next round
- q = Qualified for the next round as a fastest loser or, in field events, by position without achieving the qualifying target
- NR = National record
- N/A = Round not applicable for the event
- Bye = Athlete not required to compete in round

Men
Field events

Athlete	Event	Qualification		Final	
Athlete	Event	Distance	Position	Distance	Position
Armen Martirosyan	Triple jump	15.05	43	Did not advance	

Women
Track & road events

Athlete	Event	Heat		Quarterfinal		Semifinal		Final	
Athlete	Event	Result	Rank	Result	Rank	Result	Rank	Result	Rank
Marine Ghazaryan	100 m	12.29	6	Did not advance					

== Boxing ==
Athlete	Event	Round of 32	Round of 16	Quarterfinals	Semifinals	Final	
Athlete	Event	Opposition Result	Opposition Result	Opposition Result	Opposition Result	Opposition Result	Rank
Aleksan Nalbandyan	Light flyweight	Asloum (FRA); W 27–20	Ali (IRI); W 24–11	Zou Sm (CHN); L 12–20	Did not advance		

== Judo ==
Athlete	Event	Round of 32	Round of 16	Quarterfinals	Semifinals	Repechage 1	Repechage 2	Repechage 3	Final / BM	
Athlete	Event	Opposition Result	Opposition Result	Opposition Result	Opposition Result	Opposition Result	Opposition Result	Opposition Result	Opposition Result	Rank
Armen Nazaryan	Men's −60 kg	Lee (BRA); W 0101–0001	Akhondzadeh (IRI); L 0001–0010	Did not advance		Cameroun (CMR); L 0000–1000	Did not advance			

== Shooting ==
Men

Athlete	Event	Qualification		Final	
Athlete	Event	Points	Rank	Points	Rank
Norayr Bakhtamyan	50 m pistol	564	4 Q	654.8	4
Norayr Bakhtamyan	10 m air pistol	582	6 Q	681.9	7

== Swimming ==
Women

Athlete	Event	Heat		Semifinal		Final	
Athlete	Event	Time	Rank	Time	Rank	Time	Rank
Varduhi Avetisyan	100 m breaststroke	1:18.87	42	Did not advance			

== Tennis ==
Athlete	Event	Round of 64	Round of 32	Round of 16	Quarterfinals	Semifinals	Final / BM	
Athlete	Event	Opposition Score	Opposition Score	Opposition Score	Opposition Score	Opposition Score	Opposition Score	Rank
Sargis Sargsian	Men's singles	Ljubičić (CRO); L 6–3, 6–2	Did not advance					

== Weightlifting ==
Athlete	Event	Snatch		Clean & Jerk		Total	Rank
Athlete	Event	Result	Rank	Result	Rank	Total	Rank
Armen Ghazaryan	Men's −62 kg	135	5	160	=4	295	4
Gevorg Aleksanyan	Men's −77 kg	162.5	5	~~190~~	DNF	162.5	DNF
Tigran Vardan Martirosyan	Men's −85 kg	167.5	=6	200	=5	367.5	7
Ashot Danielyan	Men's +105 kg	~~200~~	DNF	—	—	—	DNF

== Wrestling ==
Key

- VT - Victory by Fall.
- PP - Decision by Points - the loser with technical points.
- PO - Decision by Points - the loser without technical points.

Men's freestyle

Athlete	Event	Elimination Pool				Quarterfinal	Semifinal	Final / BM	
Athlete	Event	Opposition Result	Opposition Result	Opposition Result	Rank	Opposition Result	Opposition Result	Opposition Result	Rank
Martin Berberyan	−55 kg	Doğan (TUR); W 3–1 ^{PP}	O S-N (PRK); L 1–3 ^{PP}	Kardanov (GRE); L 1–3 ^{PP}	3	Did not advance			11
Zhirayr Hovhannisyan	−66 kg	Taskoudis (GRE); W 3–1 ^{PP}	Kumar (IND); L 1–3 ^{PP}	—N/a	2	Did not advance			11
Arayik Gevorgyan	−74 kg	Ackerman (GBR); W 4–0 ^{ST}	Laliyev (KAZ); L 0–5 ^{VT}	—N/a	2	Did not advance			8
Mahmed Aghaev	−84 kg	Danko (UKR); L 0–5 ^{EV}	Yavaşer (TUR); L 0–5 ^{EV}	—N/a	3	Did not advance			22

Men's Greco-Roman

Athlete	Event	Elimination Pool			Quarterfinal	Semifinal	Final / BM	
Athlete	Event	Opposition Result	Opposition Result	Rank	Opposition Result	Opposition Result	Opposition Result	Rank
Vaghinak Galstyan	−66 kg	Semenov (RUS); W 3–1 ^{PP}	Samuelsson (SWE); L 1–3 ^{PP}	3	Did not advance			8
Levon Geghamyan	−84 kg	Makaranka (BLR); L 0–3 ^{PO}	Minguzzi (ITA); W 4–0 ^{ST}	2	Did not advance			8
Haykaz Galstyan	−120 kg	Szczepaniak (FRA); L 1–3 ^{PP}	Barreno (VEN); W 3–1 ^{PP}	2	Did not advance			9
