= Sailing at the 2004 Summer Olympics – Finn =

Men's Finn at the Games of the XXVIII Olympiad
- Line drawing of the Finn
- Venue: Agios Kosmas Olympic Sailing Centre
- Dates: First race: 14 August 2004; Last race: 21 August 2004
- Competitors: 25 from 25 nations

Medalists
1st place, gold medalist(s)		Ben Ainslie	Great Britain
2nd place, silver medalist(s)		Rafael Trujillo	Spain
3rd place, bronze medalist(s)		Mateusz Kusznierewicz	Poland

The Men's Finn was a sailing event on the Sailing at the 2004 Summer Olympics program in Agios Kosmas Olympic Sailing Centre. Eleven races were scheduled and completed with one discard. 25 sailors, on 25 boats, from 25 nations competed.

== Race schedule ==
Practice Race	Series Race	Res = Reserve Day

Date	August																	
Date	12 Thu	13 Fri	14 Sat	15 Sun	16 Mon	17 Tue	18 Wed	19 Thu	20 Fri	21 Sat	22 Sun	23 Mon	24 Tue	25 Wed	26 Thu	27 Fri	28 Sat	29 Sun
Actual	PR	PR	S1,2	S3,4	S5,6	Res	S7,8	S9,10	Res	S11								
Scheduled	PR		S1,2	S3,4	S5,6	Res	S7,8	S9,10	Res	S11								

== Final results ==
Rank	Country	Helmsman	Race 1		Race 2		Race 3		Race 4		Race 5		Race 6		Race 7		Race 8		Race 9		Race 10		Race 11		Total	Total – discard
Rank	Country	Helmsman	Pos.	Pts.	Pos.	Pts.	Pos.	Pts.	Pos.	Pts.	Pos.	Pts.	Pos.	Pts.	Pos.	Pts.	Pos.	Pts.	Pos.	Pts.	Pos.	Pts.	Pos.	Pts.	Total	Total – discard
1st place, gold medalist(s)	Great Britain	Ben Ainslie	9	9.0	~~DSQ~~	~~26.0~~	1	1.0	1	1.0	4	4.0	1	1.0	2	2.0	3	3.0	2	2.0	1	1.0	14	14.0	64.0	38.0
2nd place, silver medalist(s)	Spain	Rafael Trujillo	8	8.0	3	3.0	3	3.0	6	6.0	2	2.0	3	3.0	~~OCS~~	~~26.0~~	4	4.0	5	5.0	4	4.0	13	13.0	77.0	51.0
3rd place, bronze medalist(s)	Poland	Mateusz Kusznierewicz	3	3.0	1	1.0	6	6.0	4	4.0	11	11.0	~~OCS~~	~~26.0~~	17	17.0	1	1.0	7	7.0	2	2.0	1	1.0	79.0	53.0
4	Croatia	Karlo Kuret	6	6.0	2	2.0	10	10.0	8	8.0	12	12.0	~~18~~	~~18.0~~	7	7.0	5	5.0	3	3.0	3	3.0	5	5.0	79.0	61.0
5	Greece	Aimilios Papathanasiou	1	1.0	5	5.0	17	17.0	13	13.0	15	15.0	6	6.0	RDG	8.4	2	2.0	1	1.0	~~22~~	~~22.0~~	4	4.0	92.4	72.4
6	Australia	Anthony Nossiter	18	18.0	8	8.0	4	4.0	7	7.0	8	8.0	13	13.0	1	1.0	8	8.0	20	20.0	6	6.0	~~25~~	~~25.0~~	118.0	93.0
7	Belgium	Sébastien Godefroid	19	19.0	12	12.0	2	2.0	5	5.0	6	6.0	5	5.0	3	3.0	11	11.0	~~24~~	~~24.0~~	18	18.0	15	15.0	120.0	96.0
8	France	Guillaume Florent	7	7.0	7	7.0	5	5.0	16	16.0	3	3.0	9	9.0	9	9.0	15	15.0	13	13.0	12	12.0	~~19~~	~~19.0~~	115.0	96.0
9	Denmark	Jonas Høgh-Christensen	16	16.0	4	4.0	23	23.0	~~DNF~~	~~26.0~~	1	1.0	8	8.0	11	11.0	13	13.0	10	10.0	8	8.0	11	11.0	131.0	105.0
10	Brazil	João Signorini	15	15.0	9	9.0	~~21~~	~~21.0~~	15	15.0	21	21.0	4	4.0	5	5.0	6	6.0	12	12.0	9	9.0	17	17.0	134.0	113.0
11	United States	Kevin Hall	11	11.0	6	6.0	13	13.0	~~17~~	~~17.0~~	16	16.0	14	14.0	13	13.0	9	9.0	9	9.0	17	17.0	7	7.0	132.0	115.0
12	Ireland	David Burrows	17	17.0	14	14.0	9	9.0	3	3.0	18	18.0	2	2.0	~~OCS~~	~~26.0~~	10	10.0	11	11.0	10	10.0	22	22.0	142.0	116.0
13	New Zealand	Dean Barker	5	5.0	10	10.0	7	7.0	11	11.0	7	7.0	16	16.0	~~OCS~~	~~26.0~~	12	12.0	19	19.0	20	20.0	10	10.0	143.0	117.0
14	Sweden	Daniel Birgmark	12	12.0	13	13.0	11	11.0	14	14.0	14	14.0	10	10.0	4	4.0	7	7.0	17	17.0	16	16.0	~~21~~	~~21.0~~	139.0	118.0
15	Czech Republic	Michal Maier	13	13.0	17	17.0	19	19.0	9	9.0	~~20~~	~~20.0~~	12	12.0	15	15.0	18	18.0	4	4.0	7	7.0	6	6.0	140.0	120.0
16	Turkey	Ali Enver Adakan	2	2.0	15	15.0	8	8.0	10	10.0	22	22.0	11	11.0	10	10.0	21	21.0	16	16.0	~~24~~	~~24.0~~	9	9.0	148.0	124.0
17	Germany	Michael Fellmann	14	14.0	11	11.0	12	12.0	2	2.0	9	9.0	17	17.0	19	19.0	19	19.0	~~25~~	~~25.0~~	21	21.0	3	3.0	152.0	127.0
18	Canada	Richard Clarke	10	10.0	18	18.0	15	15.0	22	22.0	19	19.0	15	15.0	~~OCS~~	~~26.0~~	14	14.0	8	8.0	11	11.0	2	2.0	160.0	134.0
19	Netherlands	Jaap Zielhuis	~~22~~	~~22.0~~	19	19.0	18	18.0	12	12.0	13	13.0	7	7.0	12	12.0	16	16.0	14	14.0	13	13.0	12	12.0	158.0	136.0
20	Slovenia	Gašper Vinčec	4	4.0	24	24.0	14	14.0	19	19.0	~~DNF~~	~~26.0~~	19	19.0	8	8.0	17	17.0	18	18.0	5	5.0	23	23.0	177.0	151.0
21	Russia	Vladimir Krutskikh	~~23~~	~~23.0~~	22	22.0	22	22.0	21	21.0	10	10.0	23	23.0	16	16.0	22	22.0	6	6.0	23	23.0	8	8.0	196.0	173.0
22	Argentina	Alejandro Colla	20	20.0	21	21.0	~~25~~	~~25.0~~	18	18.0	5	5.0	20	20.0	14	14.0	20	20.0	21	21.0	19	19.0	16	16.0	199.0	174.0
23	Hungary	Bálazs Hajdú	~~24~~	~~24.0~~	16	16.0	16	16.0	20	20.0	17	17.0	22	22.0	20	20.0	23	23.0	15	15.0	14	14.0	20	20.0	207.0	183.0
24	Italy	Michele Marchesini	21	21.0	20	20.0	20	20.0	24	24.0	24	24.0	24	24.0	6	6.0	~~25~~	~~25.0~~	23	23.0	15	15.0	24	24.0	226.0	201.0
25	Estonia	Imre Taveter	~~25~~	~~25.0~~	23	23.0	24	24.0	23	23.0	23	23.0	21	21.0	18	18.0	24	24.0	22	22.0	25	25.0	18	18.0	246.0	221.0

Legend: DNF – Did not finish; DSQ – Disqualified; OCS – On the course side of the starting line; RDG – Redress given;
Discard is crossed out and does not count for the overall result.

== Daily standings ==
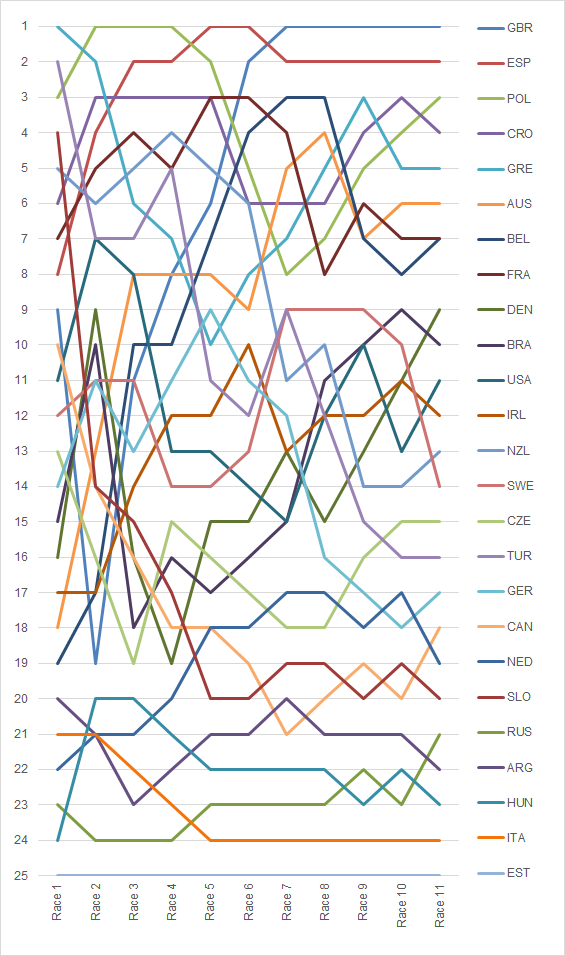
Graph showing the daily standings in the Finn during the 2004 Summer Olympics
