= 2004 European Union Amateur Boxing Championships =

Boxing competitions

2004 Men's European Union Boxing Championships
- Host city: Madrid
- Country: Spain
- Athletes: 92
- Dates: 20–27 June

The Men's 2004 European Union Amateur Boxing Championships were held in Madrid, Spain from June 20 to June 27.

The 4th edition of the annual competition was organised by the European governing body for amateur boxing, EABA. A total number of 92 fighters from across Europe competed at these championships.

== Medal winners ==
Event	Gold	Silver	Bronze
Light Flyweight (– 48 kilograms)	Salim Salimov; Bulgaria	Łukasz Maszczyk; Poland	Vladislavas Sokolovas; Latvia Redouane Asloum; France
Flyweight (– 51 kilograms)	Alfonso Pinto; Italy	Jérôme Thomas; France	Rudolf Dydi; Slovakia Aleksander Władimirow; Bulgaria
Bantamweight (– 54 kilograms)	Detelin Dalakliev; Bulgaria	Zsolt Bedak; Hungary	Ali Hallab; France Bogdan Dobrescu; Romania
Featherweight (– 57 kilograms)	Aleksiej Szajdulin; Bulgaria	Viorel Simion; Romania	Krzysztof Szot; Poland Khedafi Djelkhir; France
Lightweight (– 60 kilograms)	Domenico Valentino; Italy	Selçuk Aydın; Turkey	Marios Kaperonis; Greece David Mulholland; England
Light Welterweight (– 64 kilograms)	Boris Georgijew; Bulgaria	Jose Guttierez; Spain	Abdulkadir Kuroglu; Turkey Tibor Dudas; Hungary
Welterweight (– 69 kilograms)	Bulent Ulusoy; Turkey	Vilmos Balogh; Hungary	Neil Perkins; England Stefan Dragomir; Romania
Middleweight (– 75 kilograms)	Marian Simion; Romania	(Republic of Ireland) Andy Lee; Ireland	Robert Gniot; Poland Georgios Gazis; Greece
Light Heavyweight (– 81 kilograms)	İhsan Yıldırım Tarhan; Turkey	Aleksy Kuziemski; Poland	Constantin Bejenaru; Romania Tony Jeffries; England
Heavyweight (– 91 kilograms)	Kubrat Pulev; Bulgaria	Vitaljus Subacius; Lithuania	Sergio Castano; Spain Dieter Roth; Germany
Super Heavyweight (+ 91 kilograms)	Roberto Cammarelle; Italy	Mariusz Wach; Poland	Mohamed Samoudi; France Siergiej Rożnow; Bulgaria
