= Sailing at the 2000 Summer Olympics – Finn =

Sailing at the Olympics

Finn at the Games of the XXVII Olympiad
- Finn class dinghy
- Venue: Darling Point Cruising Yacht Club of Australia, Sydney
- Date: First race: 23 September 2000; Last race: 30 September 2000
- Competitors: 25 from 25 nations

Medalists
1st place, gold medalist(s)		Iain Percy	Great Britain
2nd place, silver medalist(s)		Luca Devoti	Italy
3rd place, bronze medalist(s)		Fredrik Lööf	Sweden

These are the results of the men's Finn class competition in sailing at the 2000 Summer Olympics.

== Results ==
Results of individual races
Rank	Athlete	Nation	1	2	3	4	5	6	7	8	9	10	11	Total	Net
Gold medal	Iain Percy	Great Britain	2	1	9	2	5	8	1	6	1	-14	DNC (-26)	75	35
Silver medal	Luca Devoti	Italy	-19	2	2	-18	4	2	3	15	11	1	6	83	46
Bronze medal	Fredrik Lööf	Sweden	-17	5	1	6	7	4	4	-22	2	11	7	86	47
4	Mateusz Kusznierewicz	Poland	1	4	11	8	-15	3	-12	9	5	6	1	75	48
5	Xavier Rohart	France	11	11	4	3	1	9	6	-13	-17	5	5	85	55
6	Russ Silvestri	United States	3	-18	6	11	2	16	-18	4	3	16	3	100	64
7	Sébastien Godefroid	Belgium	13	3	10	1	14	-17	5	10	7	-19	2	101	65
8	Ali Enver Adakan	Turkey	5	7	-17	7	9	-23	11	3	4	7	13	106	66
9	David Burrows	Ireland	9	-16	7	15	-19	1	10	1	6	12	8	104	69
10	Karlo Kuret	Croatia	6	10	-18	9	8	14	2	-16	13	3	4	103	69
11	Christoph Bergmann	Brazil	10	8	3	-21	11	13	9	2	18	-20	10	125	84
12	Aimilios Papathanasiou	Greece	4	12	5	-23	10	12	15	11	14	-24	9	139	92
13	Anthony Nossiter	Australia	12	14	13	-20	6	10	14	-19	8	2	15	133	94
14	Ian Ainslie	South Africa	7	17	14	-19	-22	15	7	7	12	9	11	140	99
15	Bálazs Hajdú	Hungary	DSQ (-26)	6	16	16	3	5	DNF (-26)	8	22	10	16	154	102
16	Clifton Webb	New Zealand	15	9	15	10	12	11	16	5	16	-18	OCS (-26)	153	109
17	Richard Clarke	Canada	14	-20	8	14	16	7	13	14	20	8	OCS (-26)	160	114
18	Peter Theurer	Switzerland	16	13	-21	4	18	19	8	20	DNC (-26)	4	18	167	120
19	Michal Maier	Czech Republic	8	19	12	-24	17	DNF (-26)	17	12	15	17	19	186	136
20	Lasse Hjortnæs	Denmark	21	21	-23	12	13	6	DNF (-26)	17	21	13	14	187	138
21	Michael Fellmann	Germany	18	-23	20	5	-24	18	20	18	19	15	12	192	145
22	Imre Taveter	Estonia	22	22	19	17	-23	22	DNF (-26)	23	9	21	17	221	172
23	Yevgeny Chernov	Russia	DSQ (-26)	15	-24	22	20	21	19	21	10	23	21	222	172
24	Ben Beer	Virgin Islands	20	24	22	13	21	20	DNF (-26)	DNF (-26)	23	22	20	237	185
25	Lalin Jirasinha	Sri Lanka	23	25	25	RET (-26)	DNC (-26)	DNC (26)	DNF (26)	DNC (26)	DNC (26)	25	22	276	224

== Weather Conditions ==
Race	Date	Start Time	Race Time hh:mm:sec	°C		Knot	Course	Meter
I	Sat 23 September 2000	12:16	01:14:00	?	210	7	Trapezoid Inner (I1)	
II	Sat 23 September 2000	14:33	01:14:20	?	210	7	Trapezoid Inner (I1)	
III	Mon 25 September 2000	13:09	01:27:17	?	340	8	Trapezoid Outer (O3)	
IV	Mon 25 September 2000	15:07	01:15:40	?	340	8	Windward Leeward (W4)	
V	Tue 26 September 2000	12:18	01:02:17	?	180	14	Windward Leeward (W3)	
VI	Tue 26 September 2000	14:48	01:03:52	?	180	14	Windward Leeward (W3)	
VII	Thur 28 September 2000	13:26	01:21:33	?	310	9	Trapezoid Inner (I1)	
VIII	Fri 29 September 2000	12:14	00:53:26	?	010	12	Trapezoid Inner (I1)	
IX	Fri 29 September 2000	13:28	01:05:02	?	010	12	Trapezoid Inner (I1)	
X	Sat 30 September 2000	12:06	01:06:56	?	110	7	Windward Leeward (W3)	
XI	Sat 30 September 2000	13:40	01:20:35	?	110	7	Windward Leeward (W4)	

== Notes ==
Points are assigned based on the finishing position in each race (1 for first, 2 for second, etc.). The points are totalled from the top 10 results of the 11 races, with lower totals being better. If a sailor was disqualified or did not complete the race, 26 points are assigned for that race (as there were 25 sailors in this competition).

Scoring abbreviations are defined as follows:

- OCS – On course side of the starting line
- DSQ – Disqualified
- DNF – Did Not Finish
- DNS – Did Not Start
- RDG – Redress Given

== Sources ==
Results and weather take from https://web.archive.org/web/20050825083600/http://www.sailing.org/olympics2000/info2000/
