= Theurer =

Theurer is a surname. Notable people with the surname include:

- Dave Theurer, American game designer and computer programmer
- Elisabeth Theurer (born 1956), Austrian equestrian
- Michael Theurer (born 1967), German politician
- Peter Theurer (born 1969), Swiss sailor
