= Hong Moo-won =

South Korean Olympic boxer (b. 1981)

Hong Moo-Won
Personal information
- Full name: 홍무원
- Nationality: South Korea
- Born: August 15, 1981 (age 44)
- Height: 1.65 m (5 ft 5 in)
- Weight: 48 kg (106 lb)

Sport
- Sport: Boxing
- Weight class: Light flyweight
Medal record
Asian Games
| Bronze medal – third place | 2006 Doha | Light flyweight |
Asian Championships
| Gold medal – first place | 2002 Seremban | Light flyweight |
| Silver medal – second place | 2005 Ho Chi Minh City | Light flyweight |

Hong Moo-Won (born August 15, 1981) is a South Korean amateur boxer best known for competing in the 2004 Olympics and winning a bronze medal at the 2006 Asian Games.

== Career ==
At the world championships 2003 he lost to eventual winner Sergey Kazakov 10:26, he did not participate in 2005 and 2007.

At Athens he beat Harry Tanamor but lost to eventual winner Yan Bartelemí. He qualified for the Athens Games by ending up in first place in the 2nd AIBA Asian 2004 Olympic Qualifying Tournament in Karachi, Pakistan. In the final he defeated Tanamor.

At Doha 2006 he also lost to the eventual winner Zou Shiming 9:17.
