= Japan national amateur boxing athletes =

Japan national amateur boxing athletes represents Japan in regional, continental and world tournaments and matches sanctioned by the Amateur International Boxing Association (AIBA).

== Olympics ==
=== 2004 Athens Olympics ===
One amateur boxer represented Japan to the 2004 Olympics. He was defeated in his first match by Endalkachew Kebede of Ethiopia.

==== Entry list ====
- Toshiyuki Igarashi (Light Flyweight)

== Asian Games ==
=== 2006 Doha Asian Games ===
This country was represented by three amateur boxers. Winning one bronze medal, Japan is ranked 11th in a four-way tie with DPR Korea, Syria and the host country Qatar.

==== Entry list ====
- Yoshiyuki Hirano (Welterweight)
- Ryota Murata (Middleweight)
- Katsuaki Susa (Flyweight) - Bronze
