= Endelkachew =

Endelkachew or Endalkachew is an Ethiopian name. Notable people with the name include:

- Makonnen Endelkachew (1890–1963), Ethiopian aristocrat and Prime Minister
- Endelkachew Makonnen (1927–1974), Ethiopian Prime Minister
- Endalkachew Kebede (born 1980), Ethiopian boxer
