= Endalkachew Kebede =

Ethiopian boxer (born 1980)

Personal information
- Full name: Endalkachew Kebede
- Nationality: Ethiopia
- Born: 17 August 1980 (age 45) Addis Ababa, Ethiopia
- Height: 1.58 m (5 ft 2 in)
- Weight: 48 kg (106 lb)

Sport
- Sport: Boxing
- Weight class: Light flyweight
Medal record
Men's boxing
Representing Ethiopia
All-Africa Games
Silver medal – second place	2003 Abuja	Light flyweight

Endalkachew Kebede (born August 17, 1980, in Addis Ababa) is a retired amateur Ethiopian boxer. He claimed a silver medal in the light flyweight division at the 2003 All-Africa Games in Abuja, Nigeria, and also represented his nation Ethiopia at the 2004 Summer Olympics.

Kebede qualified for the men's light flyweight division (48 kg) at the 2004 Summer Olympics in Athens. Earlier in the process, he guaranteed a spot on the Ethiopian boxing team after picking up a silver medal from the All-Africa Games. Kebede opened his bout with a forceful 26–21 victory over Japan's Toshiyuki Igarashi, before he lost the second round to China's Zou Shiming, resulting in an effortless score 8–31.
