= Maksym Tretyak =

Ukrainian boxer (born 1984)

Personal information
- Full name: Максим Володимирович Третяк
- Nationality: Ukraine
- Born: 5 November 1984 (age 41) Vinnytsia, Vinnytsia Oblast, Ukrainian SSR, Soviet Union
- Height: 1.71 m (5 ft 7 1/2 in)
- Weight: 57 kg (126 lb)

Sport
- Sport: Boxing
- Weight class: Bantamweight
- Club: Ukraina Vinnytsa

Maksym Volodymyrovych Tretyak (born 5 November 1984 in Vinnytsia) is a boxer from Ukraine. Tretyak competed at the 2004 Summer Olympics in Athens, Greece and lost in the quarterfinals of the men's bantamweight division (– 54 kg) to bronze medalist Aghasi Mammadov of Azerbaijan.

Tretyak qualified for the Athens Games by finishing 2nd at the 1st AIBA European 2004 Olympic Qualifying Tournament in Plovdiv, Bulgaria, losing to Hungary's Zsolt Bedák.
