= Rovshan Huseynov =

Azerbaijani boxer

Personal information
- Born: 17 December 1975 (age 50) Baku, Azerbaijani SSR
- Height: 1.67 m (5 ft 6 in)
- Weight: 60 kg (132 lb)

Sport
- Country: Azerbaijan
- Sport: Boxing
- Event: Lightweight
Medal record
European Amateur Championships
Gold medal – first place	1993 Bursa	Flyweight
World Cup
Gold medal – first place	1994 Bangkok	Flyweight

Rövşən Məmməd oğlu Hüseynov (born 17 December 1975 in Baku) was an Azerbaijani amateur boxer.

In 1994 Huseynov won the gold medal (51kg) at the World Cup Boxing Championship, held in Bangkok, Thailand, having beaten Vichai Khadpo of Thailand (15–10). He qualified for the 1996 Summer Olympics but was injured during a car accident and could not attend the games.

Huseynov qualified for the 2004 Summer Olympics by ending up in second place at the 1st AIBA European 2004 Olympic Qualifying Tournament in Plovdiv, Bulgaria. Representing Azerbaijan he lost to Mario Kindelán of Cuba (23–11) in the quarterfinal. Huseynov never fully recovered from this injury and retired from boxing after the 2004 Olympics.
