= Hasan Kaan Özgönenç =

Turkish sailor

Personal information
- Born: 27 July 1976 (age 50) İzmir, Turkey
- Height: 1.77 m (5 ft 10 in)
- Weight: 75 kg (165 lb)

Sport
- Country: Turkey
Medal record
Representing Turkey
Men's Sailing
Silver medal – second place	2001 Tunis	470

Hasan Kaan Özgönenç (born 27 July 1976) is a Turkish dinghy sailor. He has competed in the Optimist (dinghy) and 470 (dinghy) class.

In 2001, he took the silver medal in the 470 class at 2001 Mediterranean Games with Selim Kakış.

He represented his country at 2004 Summer Olympics in the 470 class with Selim Kakış. They finished 24th.
