= Godfrey Castro =

Filipino boxer (born 1985)

Medal record

Representing Philippines

Men's Boxing

Asian Games
Bronze medal – third place	Doha 2006	Light Flyweight

SEA Games
Silver medal – second place	Amphoe Pak Thong Chai 2007	Light Flyweight

Godfrey Castro (born April 20, 1985) is an amateur boxer from the Philippines. Castro competed in the Light Flyweight (-48 kg) division at the 2006 Asian Games winning the bronze medal in a lost bout in the semifinals against Thailand's Suban Pannon 20–40.

At the 2nd Olympic qualifier he lost his 3rd place bout to Jitender Kumar and didn't qualify.

== External linbks ==
- Boxing record for Godfrey Castro from BoxRec (registration required)
