= Yevgeny Chernov (sailor) =

Russian sailor

Personal information
- Nationality: Russian
- Born: 31 January 1974 (age 51)

Sport
- Sport: Sailing

Yevgeny Chernov (born 31 January 1974) is a Russian sailor. He competed in the Finn event at the 2000 Summer Olympics.
