= Raúl Castañeda =

Mexican boxer (1982–2017)

Personal information
- Full name: Raúl Castañeda
- Nickname: "Pay"
- Nationality: Mexican
- Born: September 20, 1982 Guaymas, Sonora
- Died: September 6, 2017 (aged 34) La Paz, Baja California Sur
- Height: 1.56 m (5 ft 1 in)
- Weight: 48 kg (106 lb)

Sport
- Sport: Boxing
- Weight class: Light Flyweight
Medal record
Men's Boxing
Representing Mexico
Pan American Games
Bronze medal – third place	2003 Santo Domingo	Light Flyweight
Central American and Caribbean Games
Silver medal – second place	2002 San Salvador	Light Flyweight

Raúl Castañeda (September 20, 1982 – September 6, 2017) was a boxer from Mexico, who participated in the 2004 Summer Olympics for his native country. There he was stopped in the second round of the Light flyweight (48 kg) division by Russia's eventual bronze medalist Sergey Kazakov.

Castañeda was born in Guaymas, Sonora. He won the bronze medal in the Light flyweight division at the Pan American Games in Santo Domingo. He qualified for the Olympic Games by coming in second place at the 1st AIBA American 2004 Olympic Qualifying Tournament in Tijuana.

He was shot dead in an ambush at La Paz, Baja California Sur.
