= Imre Taveter =

Estonian sailor (1967–2026)

- Taveter in 2022

Personal information
- Nationality: Estonia
- Born: 21 April 1967 Keila, Estonia
- Died: 25 March 2026 (aged 58)
- Height: 1.81 m (5 ft 11 in)
- Weight: 96 kg (212 lb)

Sailing career
- Sport: Sailing
- Club: Pärnu Yachtclub
- Class: Dinghy

Imre Taveter (21 April 1967 – 25 March 2026) was an Estonian sailor who specialised in the Finn class. He won nine Estonian Championships titles in the Finn class.

== Biography ==
Taveter started sailing in the Optimist class in 1976 at Kalev Yacht Club, in the Pirita district of Tallinn. Taveter won U18 Youth Championships titles of Soviet Union in the Finn class in 1984 and in 1985. He won the European U21 Junior Championships title in the Finn class (Çeşme, Turkey) in 1987. Taveter has won nine Estonian Championships titles in the Finn class (1992, 1994, 1995, 1996, 1997, 1998, 1999, 2000, 2003).

He ended his career as a full-time athlete in 1996, but he continued to practice sailing sport as an amateur. In 2022, he was ranked 445 in the world in the Finn Class World Ranking.

Taveter was selected to compete for Estonia in two editions of the Olympic Games (2000 and 2004) and trained for 1999–2004 at Pärnu Yacht Club.

He made his Olympic debut, as a 33-year-old yachtsman, at the 2000 Summer Olympics in Sydney, where he finished twenty-second in the Finn class with a grade of 102.

In 2001, he started as a co-founder and CEO of a company Frontier Hockey OÜ producing sports equipment for ice hockey players.

At the 2004 Summer Olympics in Athens, Taveter had been offered an invitational place from the International Sailing Federation to compete on his second Estonian team in the men's Finn class. Taveter recorded a net grade of 221 to round out the fleet of twenty-five sailors in last place, trailing Italy's Michele Marchesini in the overall standings by a twenty-point margin.

Taveter died on 25 March 2026, at the age of 58.
