= Russ Silvestri =

American sailor

Personal information
- Nationality: American
- Born: October 12, 1961 (age 64) San Francisco, California, United States

Sport
- Sport: Sailing

Russ Silvestri (born October 12, 1961) is an American sailor. He competed in the Finn event at the 2000 Summer Olympics.
