= Michele Marchesini =

Italian sailor

Personal information
- Nationality: Italian
- Born: 30 April 1968 (age 58) Verona, Italy

Sport
- Sport: Sailing

Michele Marchesini (born 30 April 1968) is an Italian sailor. He competed in the Finn event at the 2004 Summer Olympics.
