= Atagün Yalçınkaya =

Turkish Olympic boxer (b. 1986)

Personal information
- Full name: Atagün Yalçınkaya
- Nationality: Turkey
- Born: December 14, 1986 (age 39) Altındağ, Ankara
- Height: 1.65 m (5 ft 5 in)
- Weight: 48 kg (106 lb)

Sport
- Sport: Boxing
- Weight class: Flyweight
- Club: Fenerbahçe Boxing
Medal record
Olympic Games
Silver medal – second place	2004 Athens	Light Flyweight
Mediterranean Games
Gold medal – first place	2005 Almeíra	Flyweight

Atagün Yalçınkaya (born December 14, 1986) is a Turkish boxer in the bantamweight (54 kg) division best known for winning the silver medal in the light-flyweight category at the 2004 Olympics.

== Amateur ==
Yalçınkaya started boxing from a young age and won six titles in the schoolboy and cadet categories in Turkey.

He was successful as a teenager at international tournaments with a 2003 1st place win in the Balaton Tournament in Hungary, a 3rd place in Green Hill Cup, Pakistan and a 1st place in European Students Boxing championship, Italy.

Yalçınkaya qualified for the 2004 Summer Olympics by ending up in second place at the 4th AIBA European 2004 Olympic Qualifying Tournament in Baku, Azerbaijan. He competed at light-flyweight in Athens, Greece and won a silver medal for Turkey on August 29, 2004, by beating Italy's Alfonso Pinto and reigning world champion Sergey Kazakov of Russia. At age 17, he was the youngest medal-winning sportsman in Turkish Olympics history.

- Defeated Jolly Katongole (Uganda) 22–7
- Defeated Jeyhun Abiyev (Azerbaijan) 23–20
- Defeated Alfonso Pinto (Italy) 33–24
- Defeated Sergey Kazakov (Russia) 26–20
- Lost to Yan Bartelemí Varela (Cuba) 16–21

He went up to flyweight (51 kg) afterwards and won the Mediterranean Games in Almeria, Spain at the 2005 world championships (Mianyang, China) he defeated Andrzej Rzany (Poland) 20-13 but lost to Georgy Balakshin (Russia) 15–36.

At the European Championships 2006 he lost early to Englishman Stuart Langley.

Later he competed at bantamweight .

Yalçınkaya, 1.65 m tall, is a member of Fenerbahçe SK and is coached by Enver Yilmaz.

== Pro ==
In 2008 he signed a contract with German-based Ahmed Öner and turned pro in March 2008.
