= Balázs Hajdú =

Hungarian sailor

Personal information
- Full name: Balázs Hajdú
- Nationality: Hungary
- Born: 27 May 1975 (age 51) Budapest, Hungary
- Height: 1.94 m (6 ft 4 1/2 in)
- Weight: 104 kg (229 lb)

Sailing career
- Sport: Sailing
- Club: MTK Budapest
- Coached by: György Wossala
- Class: Dinghy

Balázs Hajdú (born 27 May 1975 in Budapest) is a retired Hungarian sailor who specialized in the Finn class. He has been selected to compete for Hungary in two editions of the Olympic Games (2000 and 2004), and has been a resident athlete for 15 years at the Hungarian Training Center (Hungarian: Magyar Testgyakorlók Köre in Budapest, under the tutelage of his longtime coach György Wossala.

Hajdu made his first Hungarian team, as a 25-year-old yachtsman, at the 2000 Summer Olympics in Sydney, where he finished fifteenth in the Finn class with a grade of 102.

At the 2004 Summer Olympics in Athens, Hajdu qualified for his second Hungarian team in the men's Finn class, by attaining one of the available Olympic berths at the European Championships three months earlier in La Rochelle, France. Unlike his previous Games, Hajdu fared poorly throughout the eleven-race series on 183 points to obtain a thirty-third overall position from a fleet of twenty-five sailors.

A lawyer since 2001, Hajdu served as a member of the ISAF Constitution Committee and a board member of the Hungarian Yachting Association, before being elected as the president of the International Finn Class Association in 2005.
