= Sergey Kazakov =

Russian boxer (born 1976)

Personal information
- Full name: Sergey Nikolayevich Kazakov
- Nationality: Russia
- Born: July 8, 1976 (age 49) Dmitrovgrad, Ulyanovsk, Russian SFSR, Soviet Union
- Height: 1.68 m (5 ft 6 in)
- Weight: 48 kg (106 lb)

Sport
- Sport: Boxing
- Weight class: Light Flyweight
- Club: CK Ministerstva oborony RF
Medal record
Olympic Games
Bronze medal – third place	2004 Athens	Light Flyweight
World Amateur Championships
Gold medal – first place	2003 Bangkok	Light Flyweight
European Amateur Championships
Gold medal – first place	1998 Minsk	Light Flyweight
Gold medal – first place	2002 Perm	Light Flyweight
Gold medal – first place	2004 Pula	Light Flyweight
Silver medal – second place	2000 Tampere	Light Flyweight
World Cup
Gold medal – first place	2005 Moscow	Light Flyweight

Sergey Kazakov (born July 8, 1976) is a Russian amateur boxer best known for winning the World Championships 2003 and European Championships 1998, 2002 and 2004 in the Men's Light Flyweight.

Kazakov won the European Championships in 1998. In 2000 he lost at the European Championships to Valeriy Sydorenko in the finals and at the Olympics 2000 against reigning world champ Brian Viloria (6:8) in the first round. In 2003 he won the World Championships with a close final victory against future star Zou Shiming (23:19). He added a victory at the European championships 2002 and 2004 by beating Alfonso Pinto. 2004 at the Olympics he was upset by young Turk Atagün Yalçınkaya and had to settle for bronze. 2005 at the world championships he again lost to a teenager in Hungary's Pal Bedak.

In 2005 he was part of the Russian team that won the Boxing World Cup.

2007 he lost at the Russian Championships against David Ayrapetyan 9:25.

Kazakov ended his career in 2008 at the age of 32.

== Results ==
=== Olympic Games ===
2000 (Sydney, as a Light flyweight)

- Lost to Brian Viloria (United States) 6–8

2004 (Athens, as a Light flyweight)

- Defeated Patricio Calero (Ecuador) 20–8
- Defeated Raúl Castañeda (Mexico) 41–16
- Defeated Joseph Jermia (Namibia) 18–11
- Lost to Atagün Yalçınkaya (Turkey) 20–26

=== World Championships ===
2003 (Bangkok, as a Light flyweight)

- Defeated Mohamed Ali Qamar (India) 18–5
- Defeated Suban Pannon (Thailand) 37–24
- Defeated Noman Karim (Pakistan) 23–4
- Defeated Zou Shiming (PR China) 23–19

2005 (Mianyang, as a Light flyweight)

- Defeated Darren Langley (England) 23–12
- Lost to Pál Bedák (Hungary) 16–24

=== European Championships ===
1998 (Minsk, as a Light flyweight)

- Defeated Ruslan Bespalov (Belarus) 11–3
- Defeated Marian Velicu (Romania) 4–2
- Defeated Oleg Kiryukhin (Ukraine) 7–5
- Defeated Ivanas Stapovičius (Lithuania) 4–0

=== World Cup ===
2005 (Moscow, as a Light flyweight)

- Defeated Anton Bekesh (Belarus) 35–11
- Defeated Vincent Montoya (United States) RSC-2
- Lost to Yan Bartelemí (Cuba) 14-26
