= Selim Kakış =

Turkish sailor

Personal information
- Born: 16 June 1973 (age 53) Istanbul, Turkey
- Height: 1.63 m (5 ft 4 in)
- Weight: 60 kg (132 lb)

Sport
- Country: Turkey
Medal record
Men's sailing
Representing Turkey
World Championships
Bronze medal – third place	1997 Mohammedia	Laser Radial
European Championships
Gold medal – first place	1995 Istanbul	Laser Radial
Mediterranean Games
Silver medal – second place	2001 Tunis	470

Selim Kakış (born 16 June 1973 in Istanbul) is a dinghy sailor from Turkey. He has competed in the Laser Radial and 470 (dinghy) class.

He is 1995 European Champion in the Laser Radial class and was third in the World Championship in 1997.

In 2001, he took the silver medal in the 470 class at 2001 Mediterranean Games with Hasan Kaan Özgönenç.

He represented his country at 2004 Summer Olympics in the 470 class with Hasan Kaan Özgönenç. They finished 24th. His father Haluk and older brother İbrahim also represented their country in sailing at the Summer Olympics.
