= Zsolt Bedák =

Hungarian boxer

Personal information
- Full name: Bedák Zsolt
- Nationality: Hungary
- Born: 26 September 1983 (age 42) Budapest
- Height: 1.63 m (5 ft 4 in)
- Weight: 56 kg (123 lb)

Sport
- Sport: Boxing
- Weight class: Bantamweight
- Club: Vasas, Budapest
Medal record
European Amateur Championships
Bronze medal – third place	2006 Plovdiv	Bantamweight
EU Amateur Championships
Gold medal – first place	2006 Pécs	Bantamweight
Silver medal – second place	2004 Madrid	Bantamweight

Zsolt Bedák (born 26 September 1983 in Budapest, Hungary) is a Hungarian boxer. His younger brother Pál Bedák is a flyweight boxer.

== Amateur career ==
- 2001 Bedák won bronze at the European Junior Championships.
- Member of the Hungarian Olympic Team of 2004 Athens in Bantamweight. He qualified for the 2004 Summer Olympics by topping the 1st AIBA European 2004 Olympic Qualifying Tournament in Plovdiv, Bulgaria.
- 2004 Olympic Results – Boxed as a Bantamweight (51 kg)
  - Round of 32 – Defeated Abner Mares of Mexico, 36–27
  - Round of 16 – Lost to Maksym Tretyak of Ukraine, 24–27
- In 2005 he competed for Romania at the Boxing World Cup in Moscow, Russia, losing his first match but winning his second in the preliminary round.
- 2006 he won the bronze medal at the 2006 European Amateur Boxing Championships in Plovdiv.

== Professional career ==
He turned pro in 2006 and signed a contract to fight for Hamburg-based Universum Box-Promotion. After winning his first 12 fights, in 2009 he won the WBO European super bantamweight title and later also the WBO Inter-Continental super bantamweight title. In 2010 May he fought Wilfredo Vázquez, Jr. for the WBO super bantamweight title but lost by TKO in the 10th round.
