= Najah Salah Ali =

Iraqi boxer

Personal information
- Nationality: Iraq
- Born: Najah Salah Ali; 1980 (age 45–46) Iraq
- Weight: Light flyweight

Boxing career

Boxing record
- Total fights: 2
- Wins: 1
- Losses: 1
- Draws: 0

Najah Salah Ali (born c. 1980) is an Iraqi professional boxer, who was the only Iraqi boxer to qualify for the 2004 Athens, Greece Olympics.

== Career ==
Ali became interested in boxing as a young child, but most boxing gyms in Iraq at the time were generally in bad shape, making it hard for him and his fellow young boxers to train.

Najah Ali grew during the Saddam Hussein era. He claims to have heard from other athletes about tortures committed against them by Hussein and his son Uday, but he himself was never hurt by them.

In 2002, Najah Ali won the Asian amateur boxing championship.

=== Olympics ===
After the United States invasion of Iraq in 2003, Ali met with Maurice Watkins, a former professional world title challenger who had been assigned by the American government to train Iraq's Olympic boxing team.

Ali and eight other Olympic hopefuls were put on a strong training regime by Watkins. Despite losing in qualifying competitions at different countries, Ali became the only Iraqi to qualify for the 2004 Olympic Games, earning a wild-card spot because of his sportsmanship, among other things.

After securing their Olympic spot, Ali and Watkins moved to New York, where they began to train at the legendary Gleason's Gym. Their story was subsequently shown at many United States outlets, including CNN.

Ali hoped to become Iraq's first Olympic boxing medalist, the second one overall, and the first Iraqi to earn a medal since a wrestler earned a bronze medal at the 1960 Rome Olympics. He competed in the light flyweight weight class (the lightest, for all boxers under 48 kilograms), winning his first bout vs a North Korean by a healthy margin of 21–7. In the second round, however, he was defeated by Aleksan Nalbandyan.

=== After Athens ===
Ali, who earned a bachelor's degree in computer science at Alrafdean University, applied to the University of Houston to continue his studies. He was accepted by the university, but has been denied a student visa four times by the United States Department of State.

At the Asian Games 2006 he lost his first match 21:30 to eventual runner-up Suban Pannon.
