= Clifton Webb (sailor) =

New Zealand sailor

Personal information
- Nationality: New Zealand
- Born: 7 June 1978 (age 46); Takapuna, New Zealand

Sport
- Sport: Sailing

Clifton Webb (born 7 June 1978) is a New Zealand sailor. He competed in the Finn event at the 2000 Summer Olympics, and later became a sailing coach.
