= Aliaksandr Apanasionak =

Belarusian boxer (born 1981)

Aliaksandr Apanasionak (born March 17, 1981) is a Belarusian boxer who participated in the 2004 Summer Olympics in the men's super heavyweight division (+ 91 kg). He qualified for the 2004 Summer Olympics by ending up in second place at the 1st AIBA European 2004 Olympic Qualifying Tournament in Plovdiv, Bulgaria.

== Career ==
At Athens he lost in the first round to Aleksey Masikin 5:23. See Boxing at the 2004 Summer Olympics – Super heavyweight
