= Boxing at the 1998 Asian Games – Men's 48 kg =

Boxing competitions

Men's 48 kg at the 1998 Asian Games
- Venue: Land Sports Complex
- Date: 7–17 December 1998
- Competitors: 12 from 12 nations

Medalists
gold medal	Suban Pannon	Thailand
silver medal	Yang Xiangzhong	China
bronze medal	Pak Chun	North Korea
bronze medal	Kim Sung-soo	South Korea

The men's light flyweight boxing competition at the 1998 Asian Games in Bangkok, Thailand was held from 7 to 17 December at the Land Sports Complex.

Like all Asian Games boxing events, the competition was a straight single-elimination tournament. This event consisted of 12 boxers who have qualified for the competition through various qualifying tournaments. The competition began with a preliminary round on 7 December, where the number of competitors was reduced to 8, and concluded with the final on 17 December. As there were fewer than 16 boxers in the competition, a number of boxers received a bye through the preliminary round. Both semi-final losers were awarded bronze medals.

All bouts consisted of five three-minute rounds. The boxers receive points for every successful punch they land on their opponent's head or upper body. The boxer with the most points at the end of the bouts wins. If a boxer is knocked to the ground and cannot get up before the referee counts to 10 then the bout is over and the opponent wins.

== Schedule ==
All times are Indochina Time (UTC+07:00)

Date	Time	Event
Monday, 7 December 1998	14:00	Round of 16
Thursday, 10 December 1998	14:00	Quarterfinals
Monday, 14 December 1998	14:00	Semifinals
Thursday, 17 December 1998	14:00	Final

== Results ==
Legend

- RSCI — Won by referee stop contest injury

Round of 16
Kim Sung-soo (KOR)	18
Damianus Jordan (INA)	17
Byambabayaryn Atarbayar (MGL)	6
Ramesh Das Shrestha (NEP)	4
Yang Xiangzhong (CHN)	9
Kaoru Murahashi (JPN)	1
Uthen Chanthavong (LAO)	RSCI
Roeung Sarath (CAM)

Quarterfinals
Pak Chun (PRK)	16
Roel Velasco (PHI)	5
Suban Pannon (THA)	18
Meiti Ismailov (KAZ)	8
Kim Sung-soo (KOR)	17
Byambabayaryn Atarbayar (MGL)	7
Yang Xiangzhong (CHN)	15
Uthen Chanthavong (LAO)	0

Semifinals
Pak Chun (PRK)	2
Suban Pannon (THA)	15
Kim Sung-soo (KOR)	3
Yang Xiangzhong (CHN)	8

Final
Suban Pannon (THA)	14
Yang Xiangzhong (CHN)	1
