= Pál Bedák =

Hungarian boxer (born 1985)

Personal information
- Full name: Bedák Pál
- Nickname: "Pimpa" / "Little Big Man"
- Nationality: Hungary
- Born: September 8, 1985 (age 40) Budapest
- Height: 1.56 m (5 ft 1 in)
- Weight: 52 kg (115 lb)

Sport
- Sport: Boxing
- Weight class: Light Flyweight
- Club: Vasas, Budapest
Medal record
World Amateur Championships
Silver medal – second place	2005 Mianyang	Light Flyweight
European Amateur Championships
Bronze medal – third place	2004 Pula	Light Flyweight
EU Amateur Championships
Gold medal – first place	2007 Dublin	Light Flyweight
Gold medal – first place	2008 Cetniewo	Light Flyweight

Pál Bedák (born September 8, 1985, in Budapest) is a boxer from Hungary best known for winning the silver medal at the 2005 World Championships. His elder brother Zsolt Bedák is a bantamweight boxer.

At his international debut Bedák won the European Cadet Championships in 2002. As a junior, he won the European Junior Championships (2003) and the Junior World Championships (2004), where he beat future world champion Sergey Vodopyanov in the final. Bedák won the bronze medal at the 2004 European Championships in Pula.

He participated in the 2004 Summer Olympics for his native European country. There he was defeated in the first round of the light flyweight division by Azerbaijan's Jeyhun Abiyev. He later won the silver medal at the 2005 World Championships losing to Chinese Zou Shiming.

At the 2007 World Championships he made an early exit against European champion David Ayrapetyan, at the 2008 Summer Olympics he was edged out in his first bout 7:8 by Birzhan Zhakypov.

== Professional career ==
He turned pro in 2008 and signed a contract to fight for Hamburg-based Universum Box-Promotion. He trains together with two fellow-Hungarian world champions Zsolt Erdei and Károly Balzsay.
