= Kwak Hyok-ju =

North Korean boxer (born 1984)

Personal information
- Nationality: North Korean
- Born: 4 April 1984 (age 41)

Sport
- Sport: Boxing

Kwak Hyok-ju (born 3 April 1984) is a North Korean boxer. He competed in the men's light flyweight event at the 2004 Summer Olympics.
