= Sho Kimura =

Japanese boxer (born 1988)

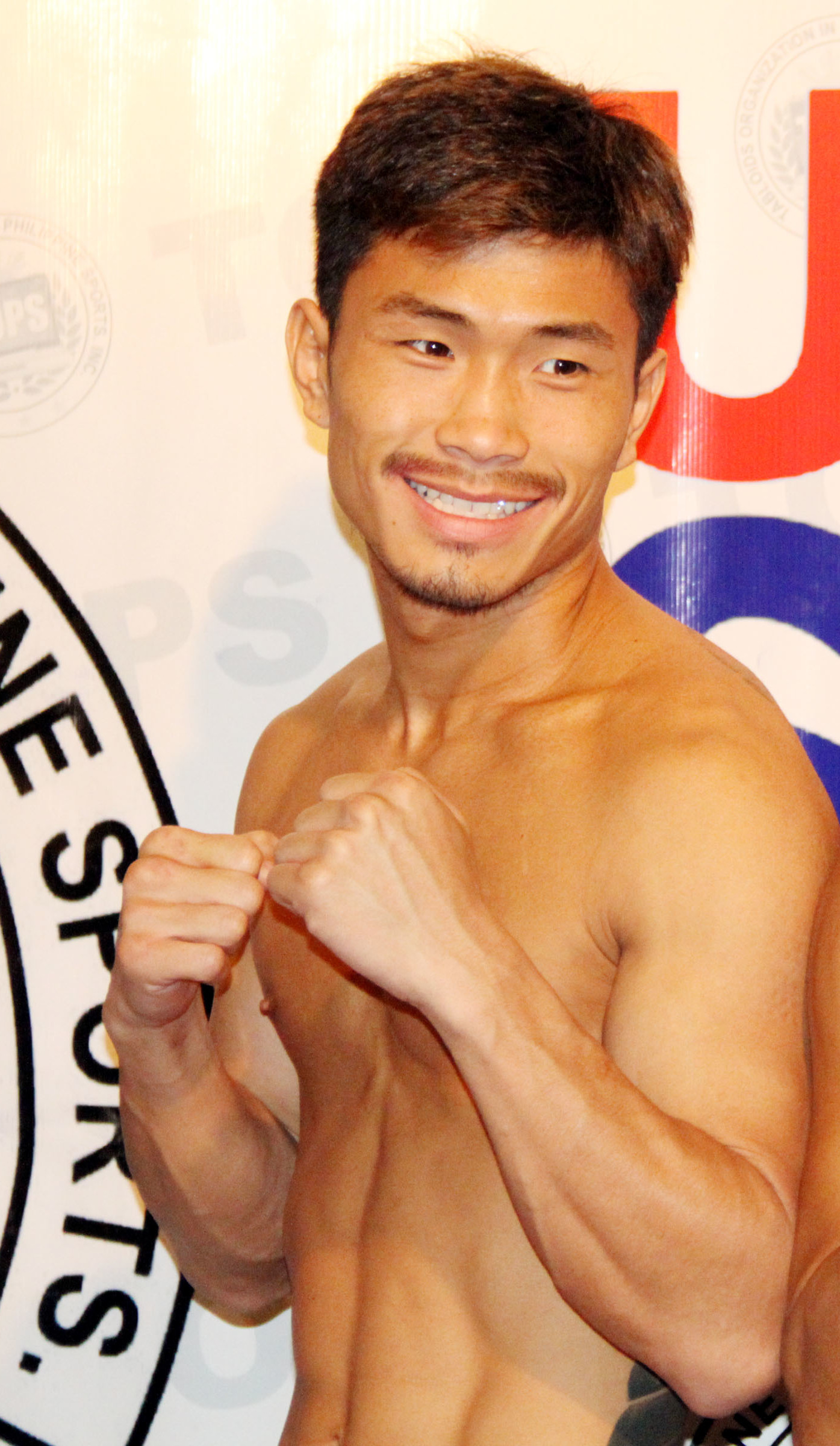
- Kimura in 2020

Personal information
- Nationality: Japanese
- Born: 木村翔; November 24, 1988 (age 37) Kumagaya, Saitama, Japan
- Height: 5 ft 5 in (165 cm)
- Weight: Flyweight

Boxing career
- Reach: 66 1/2 in (169 cm)
- Stance: Orthodox

Boxing record
- Total fights: 26
- Wins: 19
- Win by KO: 12
- Losses: 3
- Draws: 4

Sho Kimura (木村 翔, Kimura Shō; born November 24, 1988) is a Japanese former professional boxer who held the WBO flyweight title from 2017 to 2018.

== Professional career ==
=== WBO Asia Pacific Title ===
on Nov 23, 2016, Kimura defeated Masahiro Sakamoto to win the WBO Asia Pacific flyweight title.

=== WBO World Title ===
On July 28, 2017, Sho Kimura defeated Zou Shiming by 11th-round knockout to win the title in Shanghai Oriental Sports Center, Shanghai, China. Kimura entered the fight ranked number 7 by the WBO. He entered the fight as a 10-1 underdog. The fight was promoted by Zou with an entirely new training and management team.

== Professional boxing record ==
26 fights	19 wins	3 losses
By knockout	12	1
By decision	7	2
Draws	4	

No.	Result	Record	Opponent	Type	Round, time	Date	Location	Notes
26	Draw	19–3–4	Wulan Tuolehazi	MD	10	25 Jan 2023	Spaceplus Bangkok RCA, Bangkok, Thailand	For WBA International flyweight title
25	Draw	19–3–3	Ryu Horikawa	MD	8	9 May 2022	Korakuen Hall, Japan	
24	Win	19–3–2	Merlito Sabillo	TKO	2 (10), 2:16	15 Feb 2020	Manila Arena, Manila, Philippines	
23	Loss	18–3–2	Carlos Cañizales	UD	12	26 May 2019	Sports Center Gymnasium, Fuzhou, China	For WBA (Regular) light flyweight title
22	Win	18–2–2	Wicha Phulaikhao	KO	3 (10), 3:00	30 Mar 2019	PuTuo Stadium, Shanghai, China	Won vacant OPBF Silver flyweight title
21	Loss	17–2–2	Kosei Tanaka	MD	12	24 Sep 2018	Takeda Teva Ocean Arena, Nagoya, Japan	Lost WBO flyweight title
20	Win	17–1–2	Froilan Saludar	KO	6 (12), 0:54	27 Jul 2018	Guosen Gymnasium, Qingdao, China	Retained WBO flyweight title
19	Win	16–1–2	Toshiyuki Igarashi	TKO	9 (12), 2:34	31 Dec 2017	Ota City General Gymnasium, Tokyo, Japan	Retained WBO flyweight title
18	Win	15–1–2	Zou Shiming	TKO	11 (12), 2:28	28 Jul 2017	Oriental Sports Center, Shanghai, China	Won WBO flyweight title
17	Win	14–1–2	Wisitsak Saiwaew	KO	2 (8), 2:11	13 May 2017	Convention and Exhibition Centre, Hong Kong, SAR	
16	Win	13–1–2	Masahiro Sakamoto	MD	12	23 Nov 2016	Sumiyoshi SportsCenter, Osaka, Japan	Won vacant WBO Asia Pacific flyweight title
15	Win	12–1–2	Thiraphong Phaepho	KO	1 (10), 2:35	6 Jul 2016	Meenayothin Camp, Bangkok, Thailand	
14	Win	11–1–2	Yamato Uchinono	TKO	5 (8), 1:45	12 May 2016	Korakuen Hall, Tokyo, Japan	
13	Win	10–1–2	Takayuki Teraji	TKO	3 (8), 2:21	29 Feb 2016	Korakuen Hall, Tokyo, Japan	
12	Win	9–1–2	Naoki Shoda	TKO	1 (6), 1:22	30 Nov 2015	Korakuen Hall, Tokyo, Japan	
11	Win	8–1–2	Ryo Narizuka	RTD	6 (8), 3:00	17 Sep 2015	Korakuen Hall, Tokyo, Japan	
10	Win	7–1–2	Kamon Singram	TKO	2 (6), 0:51	25 Jul 2015	Meenayothin Camp, Bangkok, Thailand	
9	Win	6–1–2	Tomoyuki Kaneko	UD	5	26 May 2015	Korakuen Hall, Tokyo, Japan	
8	Draw	5–1–2	Isao Aoyama	MD	6	18 Feb 2015	Korakuen Hall, Tokyo, Japan	
7	Draw	5–1–1	Akira Kokubo	MD	4	26 Sep 2014	Korakuen Hall, Tokyo, Japan	
6	Win	5–1	Yuma Kudo	UD	4	1 Jul 2014	Korakuen Hall, Tokyo, Japan	
5	Win	4–1	Katsunori Shimooki	UD	4	4 Apr 2014	Korakuen Hall, Tokyo, Japan	
4	Win	3–1	Rungkeat Sithsaithong	PTS	4	29 Jan 2014	Suranaree Army Camp Stadium, Nakhon Ratchasima, Thailand	
3	Win	2–1	Ryo Irie	UD	4	24 Nov 2013	Hero's Boxing Gym, Fukaya, Japan	
2	Win	1–1	Akira Kokubo	SD	4	24 Jul 2013	Korakuen Hall, Tokyo, Japan	
1	Loss	0–1	Shosuke Oji	KO	1 (4), 1:15	22 Apr 2013	Korakuen Hall, Tokyo, Japan	

== Personal life ==
Sho Kimura was born in Kumagaya, Saitama, Japan. And currently resides in Shinjuku, Tokyo, Japan. Kimura has one brother and his mother died at the age of 44. At the press conference after the WBO flyweight title fight, Kimura admitted that the big driving factor was his mother. The fighter stated that he was determined to take the title to his mother's grave, as he did with the WBO Asia Pacific title when he won that last year. It's clear that this is a personal mission for him and something that really is a driving factor with his career going forward.

Before winning the WBO flyweight title, Kimura had been working as a deliveryman in Tokyo and was under extreme financial pressure - a hardship experienced by many boxers in the early stages of their career. During this period, Kimura only had time for training in the evenings.

== See also ==
- List of flyweight boxing champions
- List of Japanese boxing world champions

Sporting positions
World boxing titles
Preceded by Zou Shiming	WBO flyweight champion July 28, 2017 – September 24, 2018	Succeeded by Kosei Tanaka
