= Sonny Boy Jaro =

Filipino boxer

Personal information
- Nationality: Filipino
- Born: Sonny Boy Villaluz Jaro; March 24, 1982 (age 44) Silay City, Philippines
- Height: 5 ft 2 1/2 in (159 cm)
- Weight: Mini flyweight; Light flyweight; Flyweight; Super flyweight

Boxing career
- Reach: 65 1/2 in (166 cm)
- Stance: Orthodox

Boxing record
- Total fights: 66
- Wins: 45
- Win by KO: 32
- Losses: 16
- Draws: 5

Sonny Boy Jaro (born March 24, 1982) is a Filipino former professional boxer who competed from 2001 to 2019, and held the WBC and The Ring flyweight titles between March and July 2012.

== Biography ==
Jaro first made a living in making shoes with his father. At 12 years of age, he took up boxing where he had 59 amateur fights.

He began boxing professionally on September 1, 2001.

In his first world title attempt, Jaro challenged Edgar Sosa for the WBC light-flyweight title on September 27, 2008. Despite scoring a knockdown in the 9th round, he ended up losing a unanimous decision.

Jaro got another shot at a world championship where he took on Giovanni Segura for the WBA light-flyweight title on November 21, 2009. He was, however, subdued in the opening round.

After moving up in weight a number of bouts earlier, Jaro defeated Pongsaklek Wonjongkam of Thailand by knockout in the sixth of twelve rounds for the WBC and The Ring flyweight titles on March 2, 2012, in Chonburi, Thailand. However, he would lose the titles to Toshiyuki Igarashi in his first title defense on July 16, 2012.

== Professional boxing record ==
66 fights	45 wins	16 losses
By knockout	32	10
By decision	13	6
Draws	5	

No.	Result	Record	Opponent	Type	Round, time	Date	Location	Notes
66	Loss	45–16–5	RV Deniega	KO	4 (8), 1:37	Aug 5, 2022	Ynares Sports Arena, Pasig, Metro Manila, Philippines	
65	Loss	45–15–5	Nawaphon Kaikanha	KO	7 (12), 1:30	May 18, 2019	Workpoint Studio, Bang Phun, Thailand	For WBC-ABCO bantamweight title
64	Win	45–14–5	Boido Simanjuntak	TKO	5 (8)	Mar 8, 2019	Angono Sports Complex, Barangay Mahabang, Angono, Rizal, Philippines	
63	Win	44–14–5	Dondon Navarez	TKO	2 (8)	Feb 25, 2018	Barangay Kiwalan, Iligan City, Philippines	
62	Loss	43–14–5	Jonas Sultan	KO	8 (12), 1:25	May 7, 2017	Angono Sports Complex, Barangay Mahabang, Angono, Rizal, Philippines	For IBF Inter-Continental super-flyweight title
61	Win	43–13–5	Marjun Pantilgan	UD	10	Nov 16, 2015	Makati Cinema Square Boxing Arena, Makati City, Metro Manila, Philippines	
60	Win	42–13–5	Shota Kawaguchi	TKO	7 (10), 2:40	Oct 18, 2015	Sangyo Shinko Center, Sakai, Osaka, Japan	
59	Win	41–13–5	Donriel Marcos	TKO	2 (6), 0:51	Jun 12, 2015	L' Fisher Hotel, Bacolod, Negros Occidental, Philippines	
58	Win	40–13–5	Shota Kawaguchi	MD	8	Apr 29, 2015	Sangyo Shinko Center, Sakai, Osaka, Japan	
57	Win	39–13–5	Albert Alcoy	TKO	2 (8), 1:51	Feb 15, 2015	Angono Sports Complex, Barangay Mahabang, Angono, Rizal, Philippines	
56	Win	38–13–5	Danilo Pena	UD	8	Nov 30, 2014	Angono Sports Complex, Barangay Mahabang, Angono, Rizal, Philippines	
55	Win	37–13–5	Ichal Tobida	TKO	6 (12), 1:50	Jun 28, 2014	Almendras Gym, Davao City, Davao del Sur, Philippines	
54	Win	36–13–5	Jovel Romasasa	TKO	1 (10), 3:00	Mar 21, 2014	Angono Sports Complex, Barangay Mahabang, Angono, Rizal, Philippines	Won vacant LuzProBA super-bantamweight title
53	Win	35–13–5	Marzon Cabilla	KO	1 (12), 2:22	Jan 11, 2014	Namayan Basketball Arena, Mandaluyong, Metro Manila, Philippines	
52	Loss	34–13–5	Gerpaul Valero	SD	10	Aug 1, 2013	Waterfront Cebu City Hotel & Casino, Cebu City, Cebu, Philippines	
51	Loss	34–12–5	Hiroyuki Hisataka	UD	10	Apr 7, 2013	Bodymaker Colosseum, Osaka, Japan	
50	Loss	34–11–5	Toshiyuki Igarashi	SD	12	Jul 16, 2012	Winghat, Kasukabe, Saitama, Japan	Lost WBC and The Ring flyweight titles
49	Win	34–10–5	Pongsaklek Wonjongkam	TKO	6 (12)	Mar 2, 2012	Chonburi, Thailand	Won WBC and The Ring flyweight titles
48	Win	33–10–5	Samuel Apuya	KO	1 (10), 2:59	Jan 28, 2012	Recom Dome, Caloocan, Metro Manila, Philippines	
47	Win	32–10–5	Allan Ranada	KO	3 (10), 1:52	Dec 13, 2011	Angono Sports Complex, Angono, Rizalc Philippines	
46	Win	31–10–5	Rey Megrino	TKO	4 (12), 2:40	Jun 18, 2011	Ynares Plaza Gymnasium, Binangonan, Rizal, Philippines	Won vacant IBF Pan Pacific light-flyweight title
45	Win	30–10–5	Reneante Rondina	TKO	1 (8), 1:29	May 14, 2011	Maigo MSAT Gym, Maigo, Lanao del Norte, Philippines	
44	Loss	29–10–5	Hirofumi Mukai	UD	10	Feb 5, 2011	Prefectural Gymnasium, Osaka, Japan	
43	Loss	29–9–5	Oscar Ibarra	TKO	2 (12), 1:15	Oct 30, 2010	Gimnasio Rodrigo M. Quevado, Chihuahua, Chihuahua, Mexico	For WBC Silver super-flyweight title
42	Win	29–8–5	Armando dela Cruz	KO	6 (12), 2:16	May 31, 2010	Eastwood City Central Plaza, Quezon City, Metro Manila, Philippines	Won IBF Pan Pacific light-flyweight title
41	Loss	28–8–5	Giovani Segura	KO	1 (12), 1:05	Nov 21, 2009	IXMLTUIL, Mérida, Yucatán, Mexico	For WBA light-flyweight title
40	Win	28–7–5	Eriberto Gejon	KO	1 (10), 1:14	Apr 19, 2009	Araneta Coliseum, Quezon City, Metro Manila, Philippines	
39	Win	27–7–5	Rusalee Samor	KO	1 (10), 2:30	Jan 11, 2009	Araneta Coliseum, Quezon City, Metro Manila, Philippines	
38	Loss	26–7–5	Édgar Sosa	UD	12	Sep 27, 2008	Arena Mexico, Mexico City, Distrito Federal, Mexico	For WBC light-flyweight title
37	Win	26–6–5	Along Denoy	SD	12	Jun 20, 2008	Centennial Pavilion, Puerto Princesa City, Palawan, Philippines	Won vacant OPBF light-flyweight title
36	Win	25–6–5	Julius Alcos	TKO	4 (12), 3:00	Feb 29, 2008	Ynares Plaza Gymnasium, Binangonan, Rizal, Philippines	Retained Philippines GAB light-flyweight title
35	Win	24–6–5	Alfred Nagal	TKO	1 (12), 2:42	Oct 28, 2007	Thunderbird Resort and Casino, Binangonan, Rizal, Philippines	Retained Philippines GAB light-flyweight title
34	Loss	23–6–5	Danilo Pena	KO	4 (10), 3:00	Jun 1, 2007	Angono Sports Complex, Barangay Mahabang, Angono, Rizal, Philippines	
33	Win	23–5–5	Romel Bongon	SD	10	Mar 24, 2007	San Pablo Central School, San Pablo City, Laguna, Philippines	
32	Draw	22–5–5	Wyndel Janiola	SD	12	Dec 9, 2006	Ynares Plaza Gymnasium, Binangonan, Rizal, Philippines	Retained Philippines GAB light-flyweight title
31	Draw	22–5–4	Along Denoy	TD	5 (12)	Sep 17, 2006	Cantada Sports Center, Barangay Bagumbayan, Taguig City, Metro Manila, Philippines	Retained Philippines GAB light-flyweight title
30	Win	22–5–3	Jojo Rodrigo	TKO	2 (10), 1:25	Jun 26, 2006	Salceda Sports Complex, Polangui, Albay, Philippines	
29	Win	21–5–3	Isidro Balabat	TKO	2	May 15, 2006	Bantug Pagasa Gym, Science City of Munoz, Nueva Ecija, Philippines	
28	Loss	20–5–3	Somporn Seeta	KO	5 (12), 1:40	Mar 29, 2006	Rongklua Market, Sa Kaeo, Thailand	For PABA mini-flyweight title
27	Win	20–4–3	Kengkart Sakpracha	KO	1 (12)	Dec 10, 2005	St.Lucia East Mall, Cainta, Rizal, Philippines	Won IBF Pan Pacific light-flyweight title
26	Win	19–4–3	Alfred Nagal	TKO	6 (12)	Oct 28, 2005	Trece Martires City, Cavite, Philippines	Retained Philippines GAB light-flyweight title
25	Loss	18–4–3	Angky Angkotta	TD	6 (12)	Jul 19, 2005	RCTI Studio, Jakarta, Indonesia	For vacant IBF Pan Pacific light-flyweight title
24	Win	18–3–3	Edwin Ubatay	KO	3 (10), 1:17	Jun 25, 2005	Pag-asa Gym, Binangonan, Rizal, Philippines	
23	Loss	17–3–3	Monelisi Myekeni	TKO	6 (12), 0:32	Apr 29, 2005	Graceland Hotel Casino, Secunda, Mpumalanga, South Africa	For vacant WBC International flyweight title
22	Win	17–2–3	Wendil Cajoles	TD	10	Apr 9, 2005	Angono Auditorium, Angono, Rizal, Philippines	Retained Philippines GAB light-flyweight title
21	Win	16–2–3	Jojo Brandon	KO	2 (12), 2:58	Feb 6, 2005	San Carlos City Auditorium, San Carlos City, Negros Occidental, Philippines	Retained Philippines GAB light-flyweight title
20	Win	15–2–3	Larry Mede	TKO	7 (12), 2:43	Dec 5, 2004	San Juan Gym, Taytay, Rizal, Philippines	Won vacant Philippines GAB light-flyweight title
19	Win	14–2–3	Rex Granada	TKO	4 (10), 1:29	Oct 21, 2004	Cantada Sports Center, Barangay Bagumbayan, Taguig City, Metro Manila, Philippines	
18	Draw	13–2–3	Larry Mede	SD	10	Aug 28, 2004	Angono Sports Complex, Barangay Mahabang, Angono, Rizal, Philippines	
17	Win	13–2–2	Jojo Bardon	UD	10	Jul 4, 2004	Ynares Sr. Memorial Gym, Binangonan, Rizal, Philippines	
16	Win	12–2–2	Unknown	TKO	9 (10)	May 15, 2004	Bren Guiao Convention Center, San Fernando City, Pampanga, Philippines	
15	Win	11–2–2	Rex Granada	KO	8 (10), 1:18	Apr 23, 2004	Cabangan Town Plaza, Cabangan, Zambales, Philippines	
14	Win	10–2–2	Keeward Menosa	TKO	7 (8), 1:22	Mar 28, 2004	Ynares Sr. Memorial Gym, Binangonan, Rizal, Philippines	
13	Win	9–2–2	Aldong Pajaro	KO	2 (8), 1:45	Feb 29, 2004	Mexico, Pampanga, Philippines	
12	Draw	8–2–2	Ricky Seniego	SD	8	Feb 20, 2004	Makati Coliseum, Makati City, Metro Manila, Philippines	
11	Win	8–2–1	Noel Guliman	TKO	4 (6), 2:12	Feb 7, 2004	Cantada Sports Center, Barangay Bagumbayan, Taguig City, Metro Manila, Philippines	
10	Win	7–2–1	Richard Garcia	UD	6	Dec 20, 2003	Imus, Cavite, Philippines	
9	Win	6–2–1	Jojo Pateno	MD	6	Nov 11, 2003	Casino Filipino, Angeles City, Pampanga, Philippines	
8	Draw	5–2–1	Danny Linasa	TD	4 (6)	Oct 4, 2003	Filipino Casino, Tagaytay City, Cavite, Philippines	
7	Loss	5–2	Florante Condes	TKO	2 (4)	Mar 15, 2003	Luna Park Quirino Grandstand, Manila, Metro Manila, Philippines	
6	Win	5–1	Florante Condes	SD	4	Sep 18, 2002	PAGCOR Grand Theater, Airport Casino Filipino, Paranaque City, Metro Manila, Philippines	
5	Loss	4–1	Jerry Lota	KO	4 (6), 2:25	May 31, 2002	Elorde Sports Center, Paranaque City, Metro Manila, Philippines	
4	Win	4–0	Joseph Mancera	UD	4	Feb 17, 2002	Elorde Sports Center, Paranaque City, Metro Manila, Philippines	
3	Win	3–0	Jojo Pateno	MD	4	Dec 16, 2001	Imus, Cavite, Philippines	
2	Win	2–0	Dondon Salado	UD	4	Nov 9, 2001	Festival Mall, Barangay Alabang, Muntinlupa City, Metro Manila, Philippines	
1	Win	1–0	Daniel Arisala	TKO	4 (4), 1:34	Sep 1, 2001	Elorde Sports Center, Paranaque City, Metro Manila, Philippines	

== See also ==
- List of world flyweight boxing champions
- List of Filipino boxing world champions

Sporting positions
World boxing titles
Preceded by Pongsaklek Wonjongkam	WBC flyweight champion March 2, 2012 – July 16, 2012	Succeeded by Toshiyuki Igarashi
Preceded by Pongsaklek Wonjongkam	The Ring flyweight champion March 2, 2012 – July 16, 2012	Succeeded by Toshiyuki Igarashi
