= Peter Wakefield (boxer) =

Australian boxer

Personal information
- Full name: Peter Wakefield
- Nationality: Australia
- Born: 6 September 1977 (age 48) Modbury, South Australia
- Height: 1.63 m (5 ft 4 in)
- Weight: 47 kg (104 lb)

Sport
- Sport: Boxing
- Weight class: Light Flyweight
- Club: Northside

Peter Wakefield (born 6 September 1977 in Modbury, South Australia) is a retired male light flyweight boxer from Australia. He competed for his native country at the 2004 Summer Olympics in Athens, Greece, where he was stopped in the second round of the men's light flyweight division (– 48 kg) by Namibia's Joseph Jermia.

He was an Australian Institute of Sport scholarship holder. In 2017, Wakefield was sentenced to four and a half years imprisonment for drug trafficking.
