= Yan Bartelemí =

Cuban Olympic champion boxer (b. 1980)

Yan Barthelemy
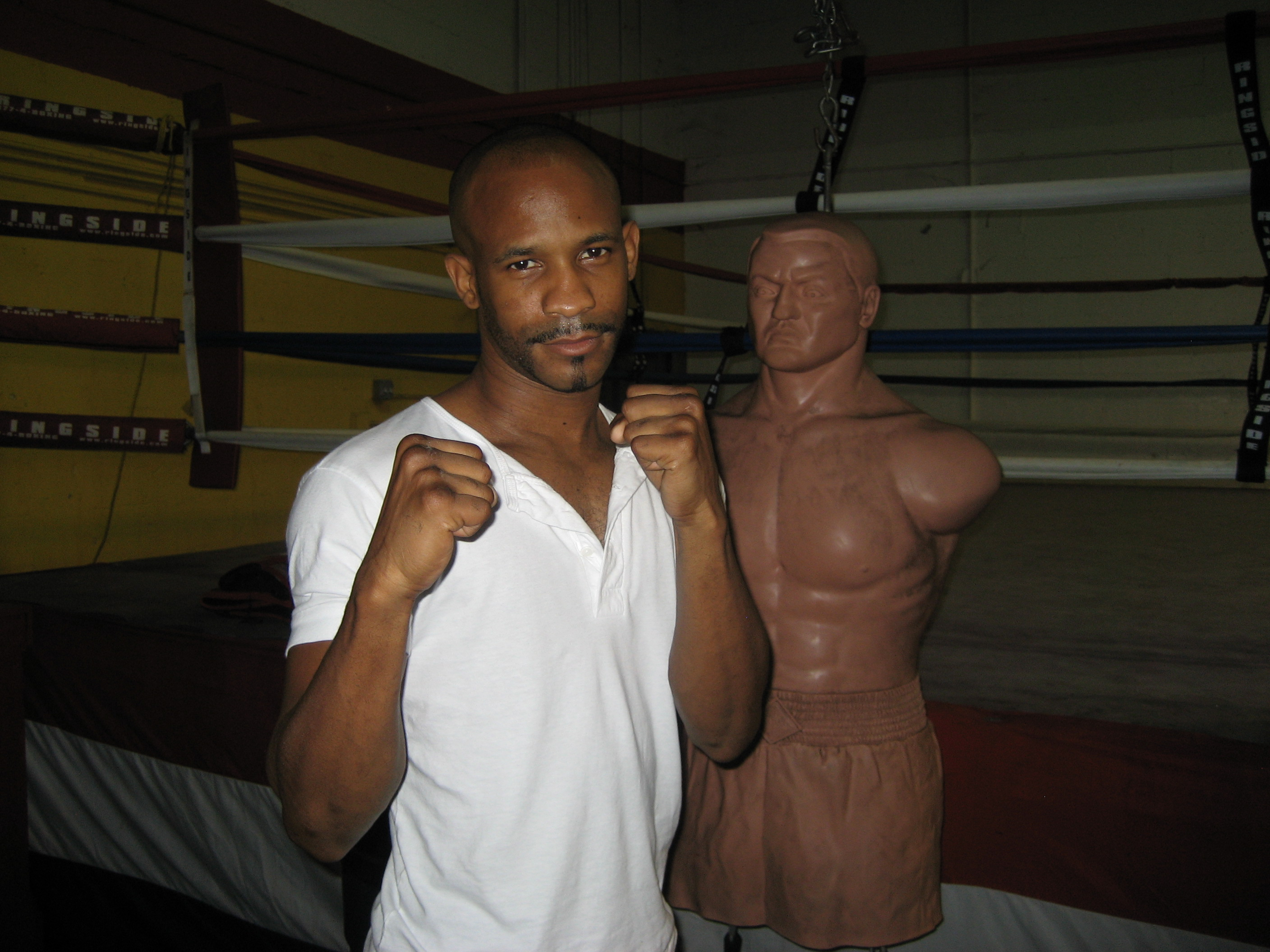
- Bartelemí on April 5, 2008

Personal information
- Full name: Yan Bartelemí Varela
- Born: March 5, 1980 (age 46) Havana, Cuba
- Height: 1.72 m (5 ft 8 in)
- Weight: 48 kg (106 lb)

Sport
- Sport: Boxing
- Weight class: Light Flyweight
Medal record
Olympic Games
Gold medal – first place	2004 Athens	Light Flyweight
World Amateur Championships
Gold medal – first place	2001 Belfast	Light Flyweight
Pan American Games
Gold medal – first place	2003 Santo Domingo	Light Flyweight
Central American and Caribbean Games
Bronze medal – third place	2006 Cartagena	Light Flyweight
World Cup
Gold medal – first place	2005 Moscow	Light Flyweight

Yan Barthelemy Varela (born March 5, 1980, Matanzas) is a Cuban-American amateur boxer, who won the gold medal in the light flyweight division (– 48 kg) at the 2004 Summer Olympics.

== Amateur career ==
- 2004 Summer Olympics in Athens, Greece
  - Round of 32 – Defeated Miguel Ángel Miranda of Venezuela – RSC-3
  - Round of 16 – Defeated Suban Pannon of Thailand – PTS (23–14)
  - Quarterfinals – Defeated Hong Moo-Won of North Korea – PTS (30–11)
  - Semifinals – Defeated Zou Shiming of China – PTS (29–17)
  - Final – Defeated Atagun Yalcinkaya of Turkey – PTS (21–16)
- 2005 Boxing World Cup in Moscow, Russia
  - Defeated Suban Pannon (Thailand) 36–12
  - Defeated Iulius Poczo (Romania) RSC-2
  - Defeated Mirat Sarsembayev (Kazakhstan) 44–15
  - Defeated Sergey Kazakov (Russia) 26–14

In December 2006, Barthelemy together with fellow Athens Olympic champions Yuriorkis Gamboa Toledano and Odlanier Solís left training camp in Venezuela for Colombia and defected to the United States. They signed a contract with a Hamburg-based promoter and turned professional.

He was part of the Cuban team that won the 2006 Boxing World Cup.

== Professional career ==
Barthelemy made his professional debut on April 27, 2007, by winning a UD against Ravil Mukhamadiarov and knocked him down in the 4th round. Bartelemí was 6–0 before being upset by unheralded Ernie Marquez, suffering his first loss. Bartelemí then went to win the vacant WBC Latino Bantamweight title in his next match. He most recently was upset by Jorge Diaz after taking the fight on short notice, losing by TKO, a major career setback.
