= Toshiyuki Igarashi =

Japanese boxer

Personal information
- Nationality: Japanese
- Born: 五十嵐俊幸; January 17, 1984 (age 42) Koyoshi, Yurihonjō, Japan
- Height: 5 ft 5 1/2 in (166 cm)
- Weight: Flyweight

Boxing career
- Reach: 67 1/2 in (171 cm)
- Stance: Southpaw

Boxing record
- Total fights: 29
- Wins: 23
- Win by KO: 12
- Losses: 3
- Draws: 3

Toshiyuki Igarashi (五十嵐 俊幸, Igarashi Toshiyuki; born January 17, 1984 in Yurihonjō, Akita) is a Japanese boxer and a former WBC, The Ring and Lineal Flyweight World Champion.

== Amateur career ==
He competed for his native country at the 2004 Summer Olympics in Athens, Greece, where he was stopped in the first round of the men's light flyweight division (– 48 kg) by Ethiopia's Endalkachew Kebede (21:26). Igarashi replaced Nauman Karim as a lucky loser, the Pakistani fighter dropped out "due to technical reasons". Igarashi amassed an amateur record of 77 wins (16 KOs) 18 losses and graduated from the Tokyo University of Agriculture.

== Professional career ==
After turning professional in 2006, he made his professional debut with a third-round knockout on August 13 of that year. Fighting out of Teiken Boxing Gym in Tokyo under Yūichi Kasai's instruction, Igarashi gained the Japanese flyweight interim title via a split decision on August 2, 2008. Although Igarashi lost to the regular champion Tomonobu Shimizu four months later, he captured the vacated Japanese flyweight title by a third-round knockout on February 5, 2011. He defended it once, until June of the same year.

Igarashi defeated Mexico's Wilbert Uicab in the WBC flyweight title eliminator via a unanimous decision at the Yoyogi National Stadium Second Gymnasium on November 6, 2011.

On July 16, 2012, Igarashi barely outpointed Sonny Boy Jaro via a split decision to win the WBC, The Ring and lineal flyweight titles in Kasukabe, Saitama. He defended his both titles against previously undefeated Nestor Daniel Narvaes via a majority decision in Sendai, Miyagi on November 3 of that year.

He fought former WBA minimumweight champion Akira Yaegashi in his second defense at the Ryōgoku Kokugikan on April 8, 2013. Igarashi and his team had initially planned the fight against Edgar Sosa. However, when it turned out that it would not be signed, Igarashi made a direct appeal to his promoter for the fight against Yaegashi. Igarashi mentioned that while his championship belt would be at stake, Yaegashi's popularity and recognition also would be on the line for that fight. Igarashi has so far fought against Yaegashi four times (once in his high school days, and three times in his university years) and won every time. Their trainers, Kasai (mentioned above) and Kōji Matsumoto (for Yaegashi) are high school alumni. Both are former OPBF champions and three-time world title challengers. Igarashi lost to Yaegashi in a unanimous decision.

== Professional boxing record ==
29 fights	23 wins	3 losses
By knockout	12	1
By decision	11	2
Draws	3	

No.	Result	Record	Opponent	Type	Round, time	Date	Location	Notes
29	Loss	23–3–3	Sho Kimura	TKO	9 (12), 2:34	Dec 31, 2017	Ota-City General Gymnasium, Tokyo	For WBO flyweight title
28	Draw	23–2–3	Miguel Cartagena	TD	3 (10), 0:49	Apr 1, 2017	Korakuen Hall, Tokyo, Japan	
27	Win	23–2–2	Weerachai Taboonrueang	TKO	2 (8), 0:43	Sep 10, 2016	Korakuen Hall, Tokyo, Japan	
26	Win	22–2–2	Joel Taduran	UD	10	May 7, 2016	Korakuen Hall, Tokyo, Japan	
25	Draw	21–2–2	Jonathan Francisco	TD	5 (10), 1:52	Nov 24, 2015	Korakuen Hall, Tokyo, Japan	
24	Win	21–2–1	Renerio Arizala	UD	10	Jun 6, 2015	Korakuen Hall, Tokyo, Japan	
23	Win	20–2–1	Efrain Perez	TD	10 (10), 0:20	Feb 7, 2015	Korakuen Hall, Tokyo, Japan	
22	Win	19–2–1	Renren Tesorio	TD	9 (10), 1:03	Sep 6, 2014	Korakuen Hall, Tokyo, Japan	
21	Win	18–2–1	Omar Soto	KO	9 (10), 2:32	Sep 7, 2013	Korakuen Hall, Tokyo, Japan	
20	Loss	17–2–1	Akira Yaegashi	UD	12	Apr 8, 2013	Ryōgoku Kokugikan, Tokyo, Japan	Lost WBC and The Ring flyweight titles
19	Win	17–1–1	Nestor Narvaes	MD	12	Nov 3, 2012	Xebio Arena, Sendai, Miyagi, Japan	Retained WBC and The Ring flyweight titles
18	Win	16–1–1	Sonny Boy Jaro	SD	12	Jul 16, 2012	Winghat, Kasukabe, Saitama, Japan	Won WBC and The Ring flyweight titles
17	Win	15–1–1	Wilbert Uicab	UD	12	Nov 6, 2011	Yoyogi National Gymnasium, Tokyo, Japan	
16	Win	14–1–1	Kenji Yoshida	TD	8 (10), 1:14	Jun 4, 2011	Korakuen Hall, Tokyo, Japan	Retained Japanese flyweight title
15	Win	13–1–1	Takayasu Kobayashi	TKO	3 (10), 2:07	Feb 5, 2011	Korakuen Hall, Tokyo, Japan	Won vacant Japanese flyweight title
14	Win	12–1–1	Armando Santos	UD	8	Nov 6, 2010	Korakuen Hall, Tokyo, Japan	
13	Win	11–1–1	Rexon Flores	KO	1 (8), 1:46	Jul 3, 2010	Korakuen Hall, Tokyo, Japan	
12	Win	10–1–1	Abel Ochoa	TKO	6 (8), 2:38	Mar 6, 2010	Korakuen Hall, Tokyo, Japan	
11	Win	9–1–1	Erick Diaz Siregar	RTD	5 (8), 3:00	Nov 7, 2009	Korakuen Hall, Tokyo, Japan	
10	Win	8–1–1	Yuchi Carryboy	TKO	6 (8), 0:15	Jul 4, 2009	Korakuen Hall, Tokyo, Japan	
9	Loss	7–1–1	Tomonobu Shimizu	UD	10	Dec 23, 2008	Ryōgoku Kokugikan, Tokyo, Japan	For Japanese flyweight title
8	Win	7–0–1	Tomoya Kaneshiro	SD	10	Aug 2, 2008	Korakuen Hall, Tokyo, Japan	Won Japanese interim flyweight title
7	Win	6–0–1	Alex Buckie	KO	6 (8), 1:30	Apr 19, 2008	Korakuen Hall, Tokyo, Japan	
6	Draw	5–0–1	Naoto Saito	MD	8	Dec 1, 2007	Korakuen Hall, Tokyo, Japan	
5	Win	5–0	Masatsugu Okada	TKO	7 (8), 1:20	Aug 4, 2007	Korakuen Hall, Tokyo, Japan	
4	Win	4–0	Tomoaki Handa	UD	6	May 3, 2007	Ariake Coliseum, Tokyo, Japan	
3	Win	3–0	Manachai Sithsaithong	KO	1 (8), 1:29	Feb 3, 2007	Korakuen Hall, Tokyo, Japan	
2	Win	2–0	Myung Jae-Sung	TKO	6 (6), 0:19	Nov 13, 2006	Nippon Budokan, Tokyo, Japan	
1	Win	1–0	Kim Yun-Woo	KO	3 (6), 1:07	Aug 12, 2006	Korakuen Hall, Tokyo, Japan	

== See also ==
- List of flyweight boxing champions
- List of Japanese boxing world champions
- Boxing in Japan
- 1st AIBA Asian 2004 Olympic Qualifying Tournament
- 2nd AIBA Asian 2004 Olympic Qualifying Tournament
- Japan at the 2004 Summer Olympics
- Boxing at the 2004 Summer Olympics – Light flyweight

Achievements
Preceded by Sonny Boy Jaro	WBC flyweight champion July 16, 2012 – April 8, 2013	Succeeded by Akira Yaegashi
Preceded by Sonny Boy Jaro	The Ring flyweight champion July 16, 2012 – April 8, 2013	Succeeded by Akira Yaegashi
