= Peter Theurer =

Swiss sailor

Personal information
- Nationality: American
- Born: 30 July 1969 (age 55)

Sport
- Sport: Sailing

Peter Theurer (born 30 July 1969) is a Swiss sailor. He competed in the Finn event at the 2000 Summer Olympics.
