= Zou Shiming =

Chinese boxer (born 1981)

Personal information
- Born: 18 May 1981 (age 45) Zunyi, China
- Height: 5 ft 4 1/2 in (164 cm)
- Weight: Flyweight

Boxing career
- Reach: 64 1/2 in (164 cm)

Boxing record
- Total fights: 11
- Wins: 9
- Win by KO: 2
- Losses: 2
Medal record
Men's amateur boxing
Representing China
Olympic Games
Bronze medal – third place	2004 Athens	Light flyweight
Gold medal – first place	2008 Beijing	Light flyweight
Gold medal – first place	2012 London	Light flyweight
World Championships
Gold medal – first place	2005 Mianyang	Light flyweight
Gold medal – first place	2007 Chicago	Light flyweight
Gold medal – first place	2011 Baku	Light flyweight
Silver medal – second place	2003 Bangkok	Light flyweight
Asian Games
Gold medal – first place	2006 Doha	Light flyweight
Gold medal – first place	2010 Guangzhou	Light flyweight
Asian Championships
Silver medal – second place	2004 Puerto Princesa	Light flyweight
Silver medal – second place	2007 Ulan Bator	Light flyweight
University Championships
Gold medal – first place	2004 Antalya	Light flyweight

Zou Shiming (Chinese: 邹市明; pinyin: Zōu Shìmíng; born 18 May 1981) is a Chinese former boxer and two-time Olympic champion. In amateur boxing, he is China's most successful boxer of all time. In the light-flyweight division, he won three consecutive Olympic medals (bronze in 2004 and gold in 2008 and 2012), as well as three World Amateur Boxing Championships gold medals in 2005, 2007 and 2011. He competed in professional boxing from 2013 to 2017 and held the World Boxing Organization (WBO) flyweight title from 2016 to 2017.

== Early Life ==
Zou Shiming was born on May 18, 1981 in Zunyi City, Guizhou Province, China. He grew up being often bullied by his stronger peers because he was small, thin and timid. His father was an engineer and his mother was a kindergarten teacher, who were both strict with him growing up. Due to the fact, that he was bullied and he had average grades, his mother sent him to a martial art school during his second year of junior high school hoping he would become a physical education teacher.

== Amateur career ==
Zou Shiming competed in his first amateur boxing competition at the 2004 Asian Amateur Boxing Championships and won silver, losing in the final to Pakistan's Noman Karim but qualifying for the 2004 Summer Olympics. At the 2004 Summer Olympics, he won his first match by beating Rau'shee Warren in the round of 32. He lost to eventual champion Yan Bartelemí in the semi-finals and ended up winning bronze. Zou won the 2005 World Amateur Boxing Championships by beating Pál Bedák in the final, becoming the first ever Chinese boxer to win the tournament. At the 2006 Asian Games, Zou won gold by beating Suban Pannon 21–1 in the final match. He repeated his triumph from 2005 at the 2007 World Amateur Boxing Championships, beating David Ayrapetyan early in the tournament and Harry Tanamor in the final; however, Zou had to settle for silver at the 2007 Asian Amateur Boxing Championships, losing in the final against Pürevdorjiin Serdamba.

At the 2008 Summer Olympics, Zou won China's 50th gold medal of the tournament by winning the final of the light flyweight event, winning China's first ever gold medal in Olympic boxing. During the final, Serdamba, his opponent from the final of the 2007 Asian Amateur Boxing Championships, was forced to retire due to a shoulder injury. After Serdamba was not able to continue, Zou burst into tears in compassion for his fellow boxer's injury. Zou did not compete in the 2009 World Amateur Boxing Championships, but he came back to win gold at the 2010 Asian Games. He also won his third straight gold at the 2011 World Amateur Boxing Championships. Zou won gold again at the 2012 Summer Olympics by beating Kaeo Pongprayoon 13–10, but several critics regarded his victory as controversial.

After the 2012 Summer Olympics, aged 32, Zou decided to switch from amateur boxing to professional boxing.

=== Olympic Games results ===
Beijing – 2008

- Round of 32: Defeated Eduard Bermúdez (Venezuela) on points, 11–2
- Round of 16: Defeated Nordine Oubaali (France) on points, 3–3
- Quarterfinal: Defeated Birzhan Zhakypov (Kazakhstan) on points, 9–4
- Semifinal: Defeated Patrick Barnes (Ireland) on points, 15–0
- Final: Technical win against Pürevdorjiin Serdamba (Mongolia) 1–0 (won gold medal)

London – 2012

- Round of 32: bye
- Round of 16: Defeated Yosbany Veitia (Cuba) on points, 14–11
- Quarterfinal: Defeated Birzhan Zhakypov (Kazakhstan) on points, 13–10
- Semifinal: Defeated Patrick Barnes (Ireland) on points 15–15
- Final: Defeated Kaeo Pongprayoon (Thailand) on points 13–10 (won gold medal)

=== World Amateur Championships results ===
2003

- Defeated Yan Bartelemí (Cuba) 22–15
- Defeated Rudolf Dydi (Slovakia) 21–9
- Defeated Harry Tanamor (Philippines) 21–13
- Lost to Sergey Kazakov (Russia) 19–23

2005

- Defeated Łukasz Maszczyk (Poland) 18–10
- Defeated Salim Salimov (Bulgaria) 22–9
- Defeated Yan Bartelemí (Cuba) 12–10
- Defeated Sherali Dostiev (Tajikistan) 18–13
- Defeated Pál Bedák (Hungary) 31–13

2007

- Defeated Constantin Paraschiv (Romania) 15–3
- Defeated Birzhan Zhakypov (Kazakhstan) 30–13
- Defeated David Ayrapetyan (Russia) 23–6
- Defeated Patrick Barnes (Ireland) 22–8
- Defeated Nordine Oubaali (France) 16–1
- Defeated Harry Tanamor (Philippines) 17–3

2011

- Defeated Juan Meddina (Dominican Republic) 17–9
- Defeated Istvan Ungvari (Hungary) 12–2
- Defeated Mark Barriga (Philippines) 12–5
- Defeated Kaew Pongprayoon (Thailand) 14–8
- Defeated David Ayrapetyan (Russia) 15–8
- Defeated Shin Jong-Hun (South Korea) 20–11

=== Asian Games results ===
2006

- Defeated Sherali Dostiev (Tajikistan) 16–10
- Defeated Sanjay Kisan Kolte (India) RSCO 3
- Defeated Hong Moo-won (South Korea) 17–9
- Defeated Suban Pannon (Thailand) RSCO 2

2010

- Defeated Jasurbek Latipov (Uzbekistan) 9–2
- Defeated Hatsanai Phoilevy (Laos) 13–1
- Defeated Amnat Ruenroeng (Thailand) 5–2
- Defeated Birzhan Zhakypov (Kazakhstan) 9–5

== Professional career ==
=== Early fights ===
After winning gold at the 2012 Summer Olympics, Zou decided to turn professional. On 23 January 2013, he signed a contract with boxing promotion company Top Rank and was subsequently trained by Freddie Roach. Zou debuted on 6 April 2013, beating Eleazar Valenzuela by unanimous decision. Zou's professional debut generated an estimated 300 million viewers in China. After a win over Jesus Ortega, Zou fought on the undercard of Manny Pacquiao vs. Brandon Rios on 23 November 2013, beating Juan Tozcano. He recorded his first knockout win of his professional career on 22 February 2014, beating Yokthong Kokietgym in the seventh round.

=== World title pursuit ===
==== Zou vs. de la Rosa ====
On 19 July 2014, Zou beat Luis de la Rosa by unanimous decision with scores of 97–93, 99–91 & 99–91 at the Cotai Arena in Macau, to win his first ever professional title, the WBO International flyweight title. The fight was on the undercard of the world super-bantamweight championship fight between Guillermo Rigondeaux and Sod Kokietgym.

==== Zou vs. Ruenroeng ====
After retaining the title against Prasitsak Phaprom on the undercard of Manny Pacquiao vs. Chris Algieri, Zou fought IBF flyweight champion Amnat Ruenroeng at the Cotai Arena in Macau on March 7, 2015. This marked the seventh straight fight Zou would fight at the venue since turning professional. Like Zou, Ruenroeng also fought at the Olympics, and lost to Zou at the 2010 Asian Games. Ruenroeng shattered Zou's dreams of becoming world champion and gifted him his first professional loss when he scored a unanimous decision win after 12 rounds and retained his title in the process. Roenroeng won the bout comfortably with all three judges scoring it (116–111 x3), despite being controversially knocked down in round 2 as he lost his balance. Each time Zou tried to get on the inside, Ruenroeng used his jab and counterpunch to keep control of the fight. Following the loss, Zou was ranked #7 by the IBF and WBO and #9 by the WBC.

=== WBO flyweight champion ===
==== Zou vs. Phaprom II ====
After Zou beat Brazilian boxer Natan Santana Coutinho by technical knockout to win back the WBO International flyweight title, and retained the title at Madison Square Garden in New York City against contender Jozsef Ajtai, he was ranked as the classified contender for the vacant WBO world title vacated by Juan Francisco Estrada, who decided to move up to super flyweight.

On November 5, 2016, in a rematch from November 2014, Zou defeated Prasitsak Phaprom (39–1–2, 24 KOs) via a unanimous decision to win the vacant WBO flyweight title on the Vargas-Pacquiao undercard at the Thomas & Mack Center in Las Vegas. Zou consistently landed quick and effective combinations from the opening bell and used his footwork to avoid punches. A knockdown was recorded in round 2 after Phaprom's gloves touched the canvas after being hit with a hard right. The three judges at ringside scored the fight 120–107, 120–107 and 119–108 all in favour of Zou.

==== Zou vs. Kimura ====
On June 27, 2017, it was announced that Zou would make a voluntary defence of his WBO title against Japanese underdog and WBO #7 Sho Kimura (14–1–2, 7 KOs) on July 28 at the Oriental Sports Center in Shanghai, China. Zou parted ways with promoter Top Rank and decided to promote the fight himself. He decided not to train with his hall of fame trainer Freddie Roach. In a shocking upset, Kimura, who was behind on two scorecards at the start of round 11, knocked Zou out to win the WBO flyweight title. Two judges had the fight 96–94, 97–93 for Zou, whilst the third judge had it 96–94 for Kimura. Zou used his movement throughout the fight which had Kimura chasing him trying to land shots. He landed a right hook then followed by a combination. Zou dropped to the ground after a flurry of punches. He failed to get up, but referee did not count him out, calling off the fight.

== Professional boxing record ==
11 fights	9 wins	2 losses
By knockout	2	1
By decision	7	1

No.	Result	Record	Opponent	Type	Round, time	Date	Location	Notes
11	Loss	9–2	Sho Kimura	TKO	11 (12), 2:28	28 Jul 2017	Oriental Sports Center, Shanghai, China	Lost WBO flyweight title
10	Win	9–1	Prasitsak Phaprom	UD	12	5 Nov 2016	Thomas & Mack Center, Paradise, Nevada, U.S.	Won vacant WBO flyweight title
9	Win	8–1	Jozsef Ajtai	UD	10	11 Jun 2016	Madison Square Garden, New York City, New York, U.S.	Retained WBO International flyweight title
8	Win	7–1	Natan Santana Coutinho	TKO	8 (12), 2:17	30 Jan 2016	Oriental Sports Center, Shanghai, China	Won vacant WBO International flyweight title
7	Loss	6–1	Amnat Ruenroeng	UD	12	7 Mar 2015	Cotai Arena, Macau, SAR	For IBF flyweight title
6	Win	6–0	Prasitsak Phaprom	UD	12	22 Nov 2014	Cotai Arena, Macau, SAR	Retained WBO International flyweight title
5	Win	5–0	Luis de la Rosa	UD	10	19 Jul 2014	Cotai Arena, Macau, SAR	Won vacant WBO International flyweight title
4	Win	4–0	Yokthong Kokietgym	KO	7 (8), 2:09	22 Feb 2014	Cotai Arena, Macau, SAR	
3	Win	3–0	Juan Tozcano	UD	6	23 Nov 2013	Cotai Arena, Macau, SAR	
2	Win	2–0	Jesus Ortega	UD	6	27 Jul 2013	Cotai Arena, Macau, SAR	
1	Win	1–0	Eleazar Valenzuela	UD	4	6 Apr 2013	Cotai Arena, Macau, SAR	

== Television viewership ==
=== China ===
Date	Fight	Network	Viewership (est.)	Source(s)
6 April 2013	Zou Shiming vs. Eleazar Valenzuela	CCTV-5	300,000,000	
	Total viewership		300,000,000	

== Personal life ==
Zou graduated with a master's degree from the Shanghai University of Sport. He has been married to Ran Yingying since 2011 and they have three sons. In 2018, he was hired by East China Normal University as a teacher.

In 2014, Zou made his first acting appearance in the movie Transformers: Age of Extinction.

Sporting positions
Regional boxing titles
Vacant Title last held by Milan Melindo	WBO International flyweight champion 19 July 2014 – February 2015; Vacated	Vacant Title next held by Himself
Vacant Title last held by Himself	WBO International flyweight champion 30 January 2016 – 5 November 2016; Won world title	Vacant Title next held by Wenfeng Ge
World boxing titles
Vacant Title last held by Juan Francisco Estrada	WBO flyweight champion 5 November 2016 – 28 July 2017	Succeeded by Sho Kimura
