= Alfonso Pinto =

Italian boxer (born 1978)

Personal information
- Full name: Alfonso Pinto
- Nationality: Italy
- Born: 4 October 1978 (age 47) Torre Annunziata, Italy
- Height: 1.61 m (5 ft 3 in)
- Weight: 48 kg (106 lb)

Sport
- Sport: Boxing
- Weight class: Light Flyweight
- Club: Pugilistica Oplonti
Medal record
European Amateur Championships
Silver medal – second place	2004 Pula	Light Flyweight
Silver medal – second place	2006 Plovdiv	Light Flyweight
EU Amateur Championships
Gold medal – first place	2004 Madrid	Flyweight
Gold medal – first place	2005 Cagliari	Light Flyweight
Silver medal – second place	2006 Pécs	Light Flyweight
Mediterranean Games
Gold medal – first place	2005 Almeíra	Light Flyweight

Alfonso Pinto (born 4 October 1978) is an Italian former amateur boxer. He won silver medals at the European Championships in 2004 and 2006, both at light flyweight.

== Career ==
Pinto won the silver medal at the 2004 European Amateur Boxing Championships in Pula losing to Sergey Kazakov.

He participated in the 2004 Summer Olympics for his native country. He was beaten in the quarterfinals of the light flyweight (48 kg) division by Turkey's eventual runner-up Atagün Yalçınkaya.

He then repeated his silver medal win at the 2006 European Amateur Boxing Championships.
