= Miguel Ángel Miranda =

Venezuelan boxer (born 1983)

Miguel Ángel Miranda Guerra (born November 12, 1983) is a light-flyweight boxer from Venezuela, who represented his country at the 2004 Summer Olympics in Athens. He was defeated in the first round of the men's light-flyweight division (– 48 kg) by Cuba's eventual gold medalist Yan Bartelemí. He had qualified for the Olympic Games by topping the 2nd AIBA American 2004 Olympic Qualifying Tournament in Rio de Janeiro.
