= Salim Salimov (boxer) =

Bulgarian boxer (1982–2025)

Medal record

Representing Bulgaria

Men's Boxing

European Amateur Championships
Bronze medal – third place	2004 Pula	Light Flyweight

Salim Salimov (Bulgarian: Салим Салимов; 5 May 1982 – 26 October 2025) was a Bulgarian boxer.

Salimov participated in the 2004 Summer Olympics for his native European country. There he was stopped in the first round of the Light flyweight (48 kg) division by Thailand's Suban Pannon.

He won the bronze medal in the same division six months earlier, at the 2004 European Amateur Boxing Championships in Pula.

Salimov died of cancer on 26 October 2025, at the age of 43.
