= Ali Enver Adakan =

Turkish sailor (born 1979)

Personal information
- Full name: Ali Enver Adakan
- Nationality: Turkish
- Born: 19 July 1977 (age 49) Istanbul, Turkey
- Height: 1.86 m (6 ft 1 in)
- Weight: 100 kg (220 lb)

Sailing career
- Sport: Sailing
- Club: İstanbul Yelken Kulübü
- Class: Dinghy

Ali Enver Adakan (born 19 July 1977) is a retired Turkish dinghy sailor, who specialized in Finn class. He represented Turkey in two editions of the Olympic Games (2000 and 2004), and has been training for the Istanbul Sailing Club (Turkish: İstanbul Yelken Kulübü) during his sporting career.

== 2000 Summer Olympics ==
Adakan made his official debut at the 2000 Summer Olympics in Sydney, where he delivered an effortless eighth-place effort in the Finn class with a remarkable grade of 66, finishing off the podium by 19 points.

== 2004 Summer Olympics ==
At the 2004 Summer Olympics in Athens, Adakan qualified for his second Turkish team in the men's Finn class by finishing eleventh and receiving a berth from the ISAF World Championships in Cadiz, Spain. After achieving a top ten finish in sailing from Sydney, Adakan was appointed by the National Olympic Committee of Turkey (Turkish: Türkiye Milli Olimpiyat Komitesi, TMOK) to carry the nation's flag in the opening ceremony. He mounted a second highest placement on the first leg of the series, but came up short for the podium with a sixteenth-place finish on 124 points.

== Retirement ==
When he officially retired from sailing in 2005, Adakan was appointed as the vice president of sailing for the International Finn Class Association.
