= Joseph Jermia =

Namibian boxer (born 1981)

Personal information
- Full name: Joseph Jermia
- Nationality: Namibia
- Born: September 18, 1981 (age 44)
- Height: 1.65 m (5 ft 5 in)
- Weight: 48 kg (106 lb)

Sport
- Sport: Boxing
- Weight class: Light flyweight
Medal record
Representing Namibia
Men's boxing
All-Africa Games
Bronze medal – third place	2003 Abuja	Light Flyweight

Joseph Hilongwa Jermia (born September 18, 1981) is a boxer from Namibia, who participated in the 2004 Summer Olympics for his native African country. There he was stopped in the quarterfinals of the light flyweight (48 kg) division by Russia's eventual bronze medal winner Sergey Kazakov.

Jermia won the bronze medal in the same division one year earlier, at the All-Africa Games in Abuja, Nigeria.
