= Karlo Kuret =

Croatian sailor

Personal information
- Nationality: Croatian
- Born: 28 February 1970 (age 55); Split, Yugoslavia

Sport
- Sport: Sailing

Karlo Kuret (born 28 February 1970) is a Croatian sailor. He competed at the 1992, 1996, 2000, and the 2004 Summer Olympics.
