= Sherali Dostiev =

Tajikistani boxer (born 1985)

Medal record

Representing Tajikistan

Men's Boxing

World Amateur Championships
Bronze medal – third place	2005 Mianyang	Light Flyweight

Sherali Dostiev (Шерали Достиев; born January 12, 1985, in Dushanbe, Region of Republican Subordination) is a male boxer from Tajikistan. He is competing in the Light Flyweight (– 48 kg) division, and won a bronze medal at the 2005 World Amateur Boxing Championships.

He competed at the 2004 Summer Olympics, but was knocked out in the round of 32 by Harry Tanamor of the Philippines. Dostiev qualified for the Athens Games by ending up in first place at the 1st AIBA Asian 2004 Olympic Qualifying Tournament in Guangzhou, PR China. In the final he defeated Thailand's Suban Pannon.

In 2008 he lost 1:12 to Cuban Yampier Hernández.
