= Aleksan Nalbandyan =

Armenian and Russian amateur boxer

Medal record

Representing Russia

Men's Boxing

World Amateur Championships
Bronze medal – third place	1999 Houston	Light Flyweight

Aleksan Nalbandyan (Armenian: Ալեքսան Նալբանդյան, born April 18, 1971, in Yerevan) is an Armenian and Russian amateur boxer. He was a runner-up at the 2004 Acropolis Cup. Nalbandyan won a gold medal at the 1st AIBA European 2004 Olympic Qualifying Tournament. He competed at the 2004 Summer Olympics in the light flyweight division.
