= Michael Fellmann =

German sailor (born 1969)

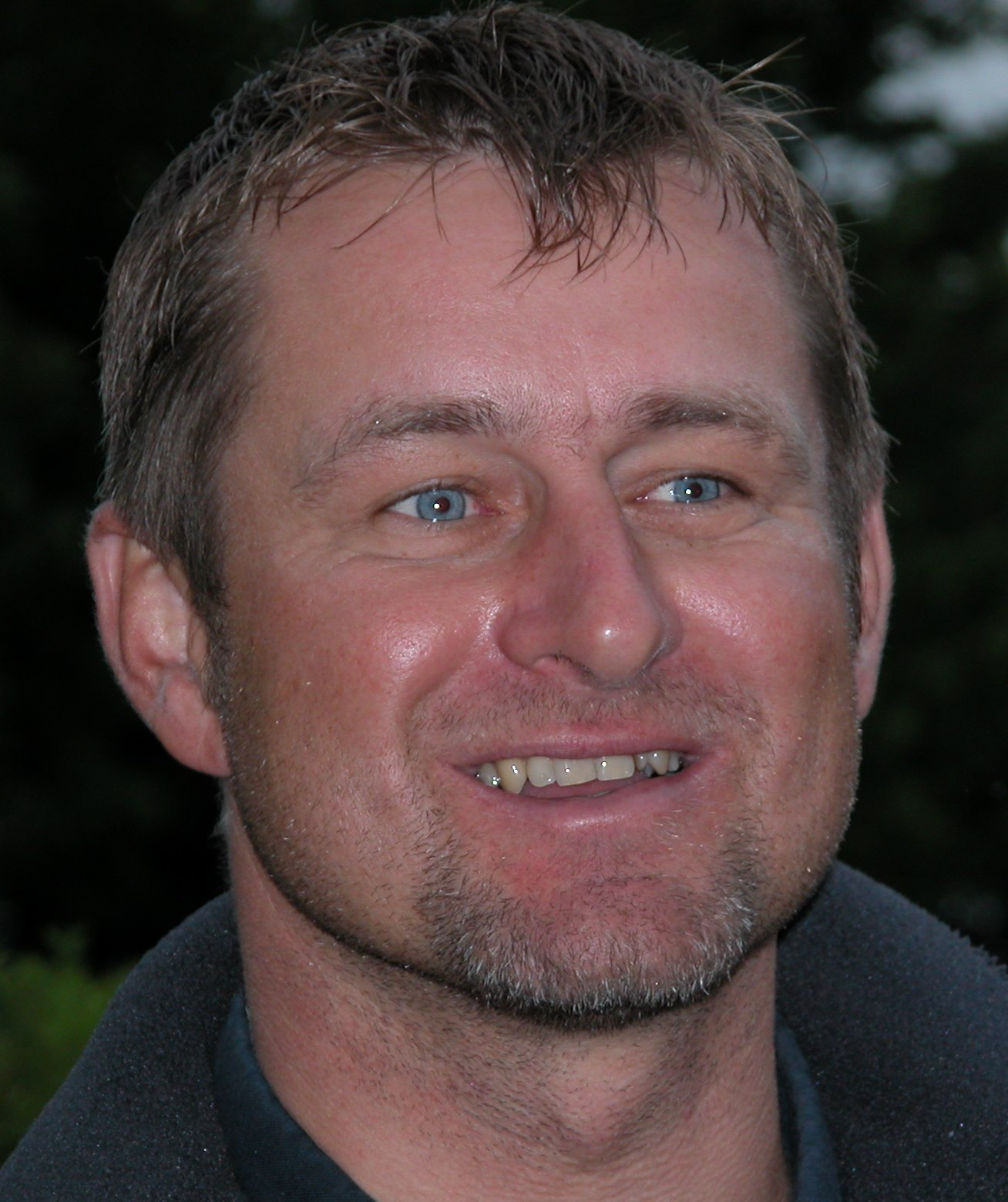
- Fellmann in 2004

Personal information
- Nationality: German
- Born: 20 December 1969 (age 56) Kempten, West Germany
- Height: 186 cm (6 ft 1 in)
- Weight: 104 kg (229 lb)

Sailing career
- Sport: Sailing
- Club: Bayerischer Yacht-Club
- Class(es): Finn, ILCA 7

Michael Fellmann (born 20 December 1969) is a German sailor. He competed at the 1996 Summer Olympics, the 2000 Summer Olympics, and the 2004 Summer Olympics.
