= Rédouane Asloum =

French boxer

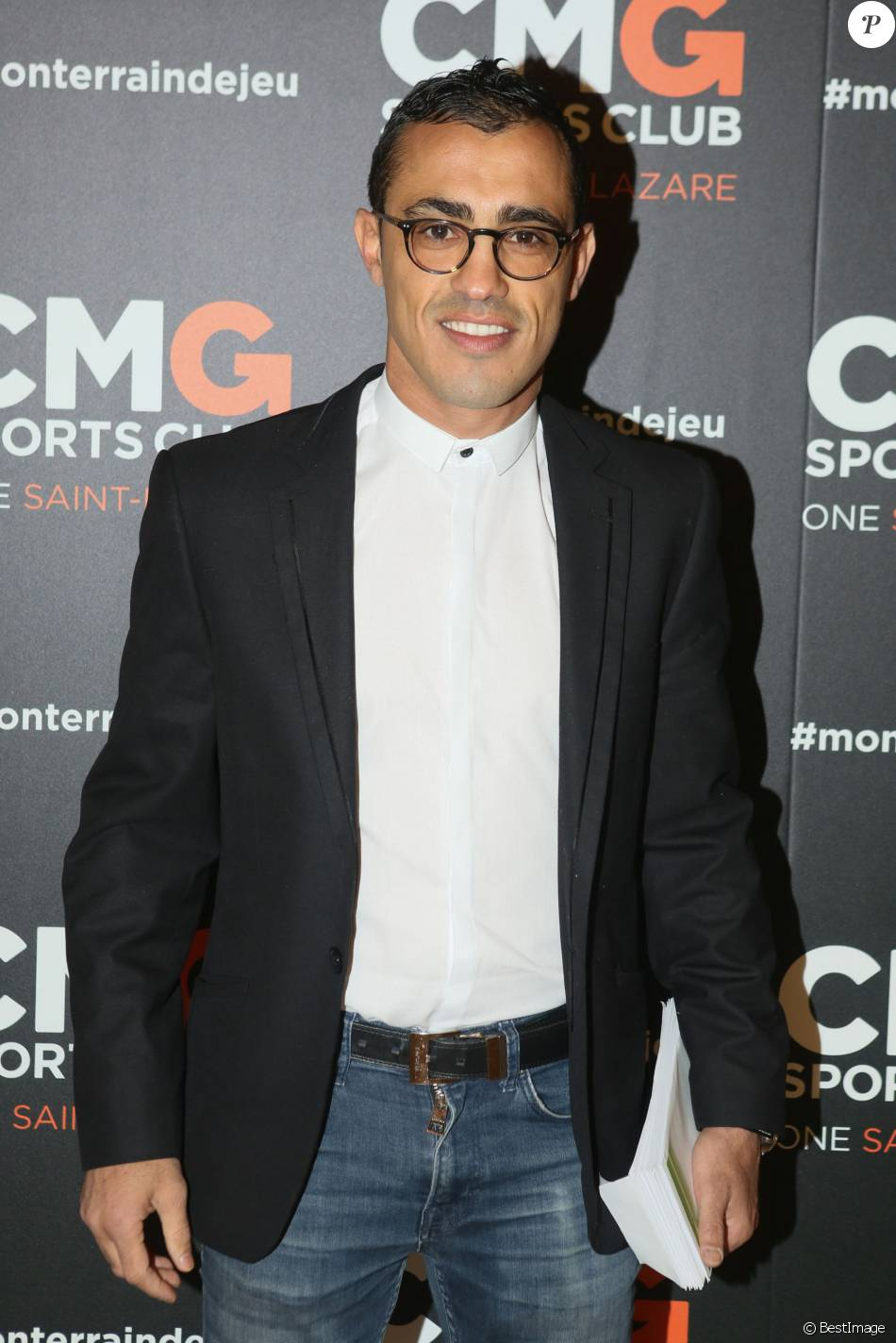
- Rédouane Asloum in 2016

Personal information
- Nationality: French
- Born: 1 July 1981 (age 45) Bourgoin-Jallieu, France

Sport
- Sport: Boxing

Rédouane Asloum (born 1 July 1981) is a French boxer. He competed in the men's light flyweight event at the 2004 Summer Olympics.
