= Jeyhun Abiyev =

Azerbaijani boxer (born 1974)

Personal information
- Full name: Ceyhun Abiyev
- Nationality: Azerbaijan
- Born: October 24, 1974 (age 51) Baku
- Height: 1.63 m (5 ft 4 in)
- Weight: 48 kg (106 lb)

Sport
- Sport: Boxing
- Weight class: Light Flyweight

Jeyhun Abiyev (Azerbaijani: Ceyhun Abiyev; born October 24, 1974, in Baku) is a retired male light flyweight boxer from Azerbaijan.

Abiyev competed for his native country at the 2004 Summer Olympics in Athens, Greece, where he was stopped in the second round of the men's light flyweight division (– 48 kg) by Turkey's eventual silver medalist Atagün Yalçınkaya. He qualified for the Athens Games by ending up in first place at the 4th AIBA European 2004 Olympic Qualifying Tournament in Baku, Azerbaijan.
