= Suban Pannon =

Thai amateur boxer (b. 1978)

Personal information
- Full name: สุุบรรณ พันโนน
- Nationality: Thailand
- Born: May 10, 1978 (age 48) Mueang Khon Kaen, Khon Kaen Province
- Height: 1.62 m (5 ft 4 in)
- Weight: 48 kg (106 lb)

Sport
- Sport: Boxing
- Weight class: Light flyweight
- Club: Royal Thai Navy, Bangkok
Medal record
World Amateur Championships
Bronze medal – third place	1999 Houston	Light flyweight
Asian Games
Gold medal – first place	1998 Bangkok	Light flyweight
Silver medal – second place	2006 Doha	Light flyweight
Bronze medal – third place	2002 Busan	Light flyweight
Asian Championships
Bronze medal – third place	2002 Seremban	Light flyweight
Bronze medal – third place	2005 Ho Chi Minh City	Light flyweight

Suban Pannon (Thai: สุบรรณ พันโนน; RTGS: Suban Phannon; born May 10, 1978, in Khon Kaen) is a Thai amateur boxer who won a gold medal at the 1998 Asian Games.

== Career ==
Pannon won the 1998 Asian Games in the men's light flyweight division. He claimed the bronze medal in the same division one year earlier, at the 1999 World Amateur Boxing Championships in Houston, Texas.

He participated in the 2000 Summer Olympics, where he was beaten in the second round of the light flyweight (– 48 kg) division by Ukraine's Valeriy Sydorenko. In this fight he lost because his ankle sprained during the bout.

At the 2002 Asian Games he medaled again.

He also participated in the 2004 Summer Olympics, but was stopped in the second round by Cuba's eventual winner Yan Bartelemí. Pannon qualified for the Athens Games by ending up in second place at the 1st AIBA Asian 2004 Olympic Qualifying Tournament in Guangzhou, PR China. In the final he lost to Tajikistan's Sherali Dostiev.

In 2005 Pannon competed for Thailand at the Boxing World Cup in Moscow, Russia, with one win and one loss. He competed at the 2006 Asian Games in the Light Flyweight (-48 kg) division and won the silver medal in a lost match against China's Zou Shiming 1–11.

Currently, he is a boxing coach for Thailand national amateur boxing team including a coach for the Myanmar national amateur boxing team for a while. For Thailand national team whose his students include Sudaporn Seesondee, who won a bronze medal in the women's Lightweight (-60 kg) division at 2020 Summer Olympics in Tokyo.
