= Boxing at the 2004 Summer Olympics – Featherweight =

Boxing competitions

Featherweight boxing at the Games of the XXVIII Olympiad
- Venue: Peristeri Olympic Boxing Hall
- Date: 16–28 August 2004
- Competitors: 28 from 28 nations

Medalists
1st place, gold medalist(s)		Aleksei Tishchenko	Russia
2nd place, silver medalist(s)		Kim Song-Guk	North Korea
3rd place, bronze medalist(s)		Vitali Tajbert	Germany
3rd place, bronze medalist(s)		Jo Seok-Hwan	South Korea

The featherweight boxing competition at the 2004 Summer Olympics in Athens was held from 16 to 28 August at Peristeri Olympic Boxing Hall. This is limited to those boxers weighing between 54 and 57 kilograms.

== Competition format ==
Like all Olympic boxing events, the competition was a straight single-elimination tournament. This event consisted of 28 boxers who have qualified for the competition through various tournaments held in 2003 and 2004. The competition began with a preliminary round on 16 August, where the number of competitors was reduced to 16, and concluded with the final on 28 August. As there were fewer than 32 boxers in the competition, a number of boxers received a bye through the preliminary round. Both semi-final losers were awarded bronze medals.

All bouts consisted of four rounds of two minutes each, with one-minute breaks between rounds. Punches scored only if the white area on the front of the glove made full contact with the front of the head or torso of the opponent. Five judges scored each bout; three of the judges had to signal a scoring punch within one second for the punch to score. The winner of the bout was the boxer who scored the most valid punches by the end of the bout.

== Schedule ==
All times are Greece Standard Time (UTC+2)

Date	Time	Round
Monday, 16 August 2004	13:30 & 19:30	Round of 32
Friday, 20 August 2004	13:30 & 19:30	Round of 16
Monday, 23 August 2004	19:30	Quarterfinals
Friday, 27 August 2004	13:30	Semifinals
Saturday, 28 August 2004	19:30	Final

== Qualifying Athletes ==
Athlete	Country
Muideen Ganiyu	Nigeria
Khumiso Ikgopoleng	Botswana
Kim Song-Guk	North Korea
Konstantine Kupatadze	Georgia
Asylbek Talasbayev	Kyrgyzstan
Luis Franco	Cuba
Edvaldo Oliveira	Brazil
Carlos Velásquez	Puerto Rico
Khedafi Djelkhir	France
Saifeddine Nejmaoui	Tunisia
Vitali Tajbert	Germany
Daniel Brizuela	Argentina
Likar Ramos Concha	Colombia
Mikhail Biarnadski	Belarus
Viorel Simion	Romania
Ryan Langham	Australia
Jo Seok-Hwan	South Korea
Sedat Taşcı	Turkey
Benoit Gaudet	Canada
Somluck Kamsing	Thailand
Bekzod Khidirov	Uzbekistan
Ahmed Sohail	Pakistan
Galib Jafarov	Kazakhstan
Brian Mayanja	Uganda
Ludumo Galada	South Africa
Shahin Imranov	Azerbaijan
Aleksei Tishchenko	Russia
Hadj Belkheir	Algeria

== Results ==
Round of 32
Asylbek Talasbayev (KGZ)	15
Luis Franco (CUB)	32
Edvaldo Gonzaga (BRA)	43+
Carlos Velásquez (PUR)	43
Khedafi Djelkhir (FRA)	38
Saifeddine Nejmaoui (TUN)	13
Vitali Tajbert (GER)	RSC
Daniel Brizuela (ARG)
Likar Ramos Concha (COL)	18
Mikhail Biarnadski (BLR)	32
Viorel Simion (ROU)	40
Ryan Langham (AUS)	15
Jo Seok-Hwan (KOR)	37
Sedat Taşcı (TUR)	28
Benoit Gaudet (CAN)	32
Somluck Kamsing (THA)	17
Bekzod Khidirov (UZB)	RSC
Sohail Ahmed (PAK)
Galib Jafarov (KAZ)	RSC
Brian Mayanja (UGA)
Ludumo Galada (RSA)
Shahin Imranov (AZE)	RSC
Aleksei Tishchenko (RUS)	37
Hadj Belkheir (ALG)	17

Round of 16
Muideen Ganiyu (NGR)	25
Khumiso Ikgopoleng (BOT)	16
Kim Song-Guk (PRK)	25
Konstantine Kupatadze (GEO)	14
Luis Franco (CUB)	30
Edvaldo Oliveira (BRA)	15
Khedafi Djelkhir (FRA)	26
Vitali Tajbert (GER)	40
Mikhail Biarnadski (BLR)	13
Viorel Simion (ROU)	38
Jo Seok-Hwan (KOR)	28
Benoit Gaudet (CAN)	16
Bekzod Khidirov (UZB)	22
Galib Jafarov (KAZ)	40
Shahin Imranov (AZE)
Aleksei Tishchenko (RUS)	RSC

Quarterfinals
Muideen Ganiyu (NGR)	11
Kim Song-Guk (PRK)	32
Luis Franco (CUB)	26
Vitali Tajbert (GER)	34
Viorel Simion (ROU)	35
Jo Seok-Hwan (KOR)	39
Galib Jafarov (KAZ)	26
Aleksei Tishchenko (RUS)	36

Semifinals
Kim Song-Guk (PRK)	29
Vitali Tajbert (GER)	24
Jo Seok-Hwan (KOR)	25
Aleksei Tishchenko (RUS)	45

Final
Kim Song-Guk (PRK)	17
Aleksei Tishchenko (RUS)	39

Notes

- Argentine boxer Daniel Brizuela took the place of American boxer Aaron Garcia.
