= Boxing at the 2008 Summer Olympics – Lightweight =

Boxing competitions

The lightweight competition was the fifth-lowest weight class featured in amateur boxing at the 2008 Summer Olympics, and was held at the Workers Indoor Arena. Lightweights were limited to a maximum of 60 kilograms in body mass.

Like all Olympic boxing events, the competition was a straight single-elimination tournament. Both semifinal losers were awarded bronze medals, so no boxers competed again after their first loss. Bouts consisted of four rounds of two minutes each, with one-minute breaks between rounds. Punches scored only if the white area on the front of the glove made full contact with the front of the head or torso of the opponent. Five judges scored each bout; three of the judges had to signal a scoring punch within one second for the punch to score. The winner of the bout was the boxer who scored the most valid punches by the end of the bout.

== Medalists ==
Gold	Aleksei Tishchenko; Russia
Silver	Daouda Sow; France
Bronze	Yordenis Ugás; Cuba
Bronze	Hrachik Javakhyan; Armenia

== Draw ==
All times are China Standard Time (UTC+8)

Round of 32; Monday, August 11, 2008; 15:00-16:15 & 20:30-22:00
Everton Lopes (BRA)	7
Asylbek Talasbayev (KGZ)	9
Anthony Little (AUS)	14
Julius Indongo (NAM)	2
Aleksei Tishchenko (RUS)	10
Saifeddine Nejmaoui (TUN)	2
Domenico Valentino (ITA)	15
Tahar Tamsamani (MAR)	4
Hamza Kramou (ALG)	3
Yordenis Ugás (CUB)	21
Georgian Popescu (ROU)	20
Sadam Ali (USA)	5
Jean de Dieu Soloniaina (MAD)	2
Francisco Vargas (MEX)	9
Daouda Sow (FRA)	13
Kim Song-Guk (PRK)	3
Onur Şipal (TUR)	3
José Pedraza (PUR)	10
Oleksandr Klyuchko (UKR)	8
Hu Qing (CHN)	10
Miklós Varga (HUN)	3
Merey Akshalov (KAZ)	12

Round of 16; Friday, August 15, 2008; 14:30-16:30
Baik Jong-Sub (KOR)	10
Pichai Sayota (THA)	4
Rasheed Lawal (NGR)	0
Hrachik Javakhyan (ARM)	12
Darley Pérez (COL)	15
Asylbek Talasbayev (KGZ)	4
Anthony Little (AUS)	3
Aleksei Tishchenko (RUS)	11
Domenico Valentino (ITA)	2
Yordenis Ugás (CUB)	10
Georgian Popescu (ROU)	14
Francisco Vargas (MEX)	4
Daouda Sow (FRA)	13
José Pedraza (PUR)	9
Hu Qing (CHN)	11
Merey Akshalov (KAZ)	7

Quarterfinals; Tuesday, August 19, 2008; 20:00-21:00
Baik Jong-Sub (KOR)
Hrachik Javakhyan (ARM)	WO
Darley Pérez (COL)	5
Aleksei Tishchenko (RUS)	13
Yordenis Ugás (CUB)	11
Georgian Popescu (ROU)	7
Daouda Sow (FRA)	9
Hu Qing (CHN)	6

Semifinals; Friday, August 22, 2008; 20:00-20:30
Hrachik Javakhyan (ARM)	5
Aleksei Tishchenko (RUS)	10
Yordenis Ugás (CUB)	8
Daouda Sow (FRA)	15

Final; Sunday, August 24, 2008; 14:40-16:00
Aleksei Tishchenko (RUS)	11
Daouda Sow (FRA)	9

== See also ==
- 2009 World Amateur Boxing Championships – Lightweight
