= Boxing at the 2006 Asian Games – Men's 57 kg =

Boxing competitions

Men's 57 kg at the 2006 Asian Games
- Venue: Aspire Hall 5
- Date: 2–12 December 2006
- Competitors: 25 from 25 nations

Medalists
gold medal	Bahodirjon Sultonov	Uzbekistan
silver medal	Zorigtbaataryn Enkhzorig	Mongolia
bronze medal	Kim Song-guk	North Korea
bronze medal	Galib Jafarov	Kazakhstan

The men's featherweight (57 kilograms) event at the 2006 Asian Games took place from 2 to 12 December 2006 at Aspire Hall 5, Doha, Qatar.

== Schedule ==
All times are Arabia Standard Time (UTC+03:00)

Date	Time	Event
Saturday, 2 December 2006	14:00	Qualification
Sunday, 3 December 2006	14:00	Preliminary
Thursday, 7 December 2006	14:00	Quarterfinals
Sunday, 10 December 2006	14:00	Semifinals
Tuesday, 12 December 2006	14:00	Final

== Results ==
Legend

- RET — Won by retirement
- RSCO — Won by referee stop contest outscored

=== Final ===
Final
Bahodirjon Sultonov (UZB)	37
Zorigtbaataryn Enkhzorig (MGL)	15

=== Top half ===
Qualification
Mohammad Dmirieh (SYR)	21
Mehrdad Hamidian (IRI)	7

Preliminary
Ahmed Mayouf (KSA)	25
Hassan Shahzada (AFG)	12
Kim Song-guk (PRK)	RSCO
Abdullateef Sadiq (QAT)
Bahodirjon Sultonov (UZB)	RSCO
Eddy Kalai (MAS)
Diwakar Prasad (IND)	20
Mohammad Dmirieh (SYR)	11

Quarterfinals
Ahmed Mayouf (KSA)
Kim Song-guk (PRK)	RSCO
Bahodirjon Sultonov (UZB)	RSCO
Diwakar Prasad (IND)

Semifinals
Kim Song-guk (PRK)	23
Bahodirjon Sultonov (UZB)	37

=== Bottom half ===
Qualification
Anthony Marcial (PHI)	31
Sathit Keointha (LAO)	7
Suraka Sabih (IRQ)	+27
Muhammad Sajid (PAK)	27
Kamal Sameera (SRI)	RET
Otnel Baptista (TLS)
Galib Jafarov (KAZ)	32
Zalkar Bakirov (KGZ)	14
Zorigtbaataryn Enkhzorig (MGL)	30
Amangeldi Hudaýbergenow (TKM)	15
Xie Longwang (CHN)	32
Jo Seok-hwan (KOR)	15
Sailom Adi (THA)	RSCO
Hong Tin Pan (MAC)
Chung Chun-an (TPE)	23
Bahodur Karimov (TJK)	11

Preliminary
Anthony Marcial (PHI)	RSCO
Suraka Sabih (IRQ)
Kamal Sameera (SRI)	14
Galib Jafarov (KAZ)	26
Zorigtbaataryn Enkhzorig (MGL)	16
Xie Longwang (CHN)	10
Sailom Adi (THA)	11
Chung Chun-an (TPE)	28

Quarterfinals
Anthony Marcial (PHI)	12
Galib Jafarov (KAZ)	27
Zorigtbaataryn Enkhzorig (MGL)	28
Chung Chun-an (TPE)	25

Semifinals
Galib Jafarov (KAZ)	21
Zorigtbaataryn Enkhzorig (MGL)	28
