= Boxing at the 2006 Asian Games – Men's 60 kg =

Boxing competitions

Men's 60 kg at the 2006 Asian Games
- Venue: Aspire Hall 5
- Date: 2–13 December 2006
- Competitors: 19 from 19 nations

Medalists
gold medal	Hu Qing	China
silver medal	Uranchimegiin Mönkh-Erdene	Mongolia
bronze medal	Genebert Basadre	Philippines
bronze medal	Bekzod Khidirov	Uzbekistan

The men's lightweight (60 kilograms) event at the 2006 Asian Games took place from 2 to 13 December 2006 at Aspire Hall 5, Doha, Qatar.

== Schedule ==
All times are Arabia Standard Time (UTC+03:00)

Date	Time	Event
Saturday, 2 December 2006	14:00	Qualification
Monday, 4 December 2006	14:00	Preliminary
Saturday, 9 December 2006	14:00	Quarterfinals
Monday, 11 December 2006	14:00	Semifinals
Wednesday, 13 December 2006	14:00	Final

== Results ==
Legend

- KO — Won by knockout
- RSCH — Won by referee stop contest head blow
- RSCO — Won by referee stop contest outscored

=== Final ===
Final
Hu Qing (CHN)	38
Uranchimegiin Mönkh-Erdene (MGL)	22

=== Top half ===
Qualification

Preliminary
Jai Bhagwan (IND)	22
Asylbek Talasbayev (KGZ)	33
Paunandes Paulus (MAS)	10
Hu Qing (CHN)	29
Asghar Ali Shah (PAK)	19
Genebert Basadre (PHI)	20
Yasser Sheikhan (SYR)	11
Serdar Hudaýberdiýew (TKM)	24

Quarterfinals
Asylbek Talasbayev (KGZ)
Hu Qing (CHN)	RSCO
Genebert Basadre (PHI)	RSCO
Serdar Hudaýberdiýew (TKM)

Semifinals
Hu Qing (CHN)	29
Genebert Basadre (PHI)	18

=== Bottom half ===
Qualification
Pichai Sayotha (THA)	KO
Đỗ Đức Thành (VIE)
Berik Kaliyev (KAZ)	RSCO
Upali Bandara (SRI)
Marufjon Faizulloev (TJK)	RSCO
Saeid Norouzi (IRI)

Preliminary
Wu Chi Kit (MAC)
Udone Khanxay (LAO)	RSCH
Uranchimegiin Mönkh-Erdene (MGL)	31
Baik Jong-sub (KOR)	20
Bekzod Khidirov (UZB)	30
Pichai Sayotha (THA)	22
Berik Kaliyev (KAZ)	+24
Marufjon Faizulloev (TJK)	24

Quarterfinals
Udone Khanxay (LAO)
Uranchimegiin Mönkh-Erdene (MGL)	RSCO
Bekzod Khidirov (UZB)	RSCO
Berik Kaliyev (KAZ)

Semifinals
Uranchimegiin Mönkh-Erdene (MGL)	26
Bekzod Khidirov (UZB)	24
