= Azerbaijan at the 2004 Summer Olympics =

- IOC code: AZE
- NOC: National Olympic Committee of the Republic of Azerbaijan
- Website: www.olympic.az (in Azerbaijani and English)

in Athens
- Competitors: 36 in 10 sports
- Flag bearer: Nizami Pashayev
- Medals Ranked 50th: Gold 1 Silver 0 Bronze 4 Total 5

Summer Olympics appearances (overview)
- 1996; 2000; 2004; 2008; 2012; 2016; 2020; 2024

Other related appearances
- Russian Empire (1900–1912); Soviet Union (1952–1988); Unified Team (1992)

Azerbaijan competed at the 2004 Summer Olympics in Athens, Greece from 13 to 29 August 2004. 36 competitors, 30 men and 6 women, took part in 36 events in 10 sports.

== Medalists ==
Medal	Name	Sport	Event	Date
Gold	Farid Mansurov	Wrestling	Men's Greco-Roman 66 kg	August 25
Bronze	Irada Ashumova	Shooting	Women's 25 m pistol	August 18
Bronze	Zemfira Meftahatdinova	Shooting	Women's skeet	August 19
Bronze	Fuad Aslanov	Boxing	Flyweight	August 29
Bronze	Aghasi Mammadov	Boxing	Bantamweight	August 29

== Athletics ==
Azerbaijani athletes have so far achieved qualifying standards in the following athletics events (up to a maximum of 3 athletes in each event at the 'A' Standard, and 1 at the 'B' Standard).

Key

- Note–Ranks given for track events are within the athlete's heat only
- Q = Qualified for the next round
- q = Qualified for the next round as a fastest loser or, in field events, by position without achieving the qualifying target
- NR = National record
- N/A = Round not applicable for the event
- Bye = Athlete not required to compete in round

Men
Track & road events

Athlete	Event	Heat		Quarterfinal		Semifinal		Final	
Athlete	Event	Result	Rank	Result	Rank	Result	Rank	Result	Rank
Teymur Gasimov	100 m	11.17	8	Did not advance					
Dadash Ibrahimov	200 m	21.60	7	Did not advance					
Alibay Shukurov	800 m	1:51.11	7	—N/a		Did not advance			

Field events

Athlete	Event	Qualification		Final	
Athlete	Event	Distance	Position	Distance	Position
Sergey Bochkov	Triple jump	DNS		Did not advance	

Women
Field events

Athlete	Event	Qualification		Final	
Athlete	Event	Distance	Position	Distance	Position
Marina Lapina	Hammer throw	55.34	46	Did not advance	

== Boxing ==
Azerbaijan sent 9 boxers to the Olympics. They won 2 bronze medals, with 3 other boxers falling in the quarterfinals. The combined record of the Azeri boxers was 15-9, with each boxer winning at least one match. Azerbaijan was in a four-way tie for 12th place in the boxing medals scoreboard.

Athlete	Event	Round of 32	Round of 16	Quarterfinals	Semifinals	Final	
Athlete	Event	Opposition Result	Opposition Result	Opposition Result	Opposition Result	Opposition Result	Rank
Jeyhun Abiyev	Flyweight	Bedák (HUN); W 23–8	Yalçınkaya (TUR); L 20–23	Did not advance			
Fuad Aslanov	Flyweight	Rakotoarimbelo (MAD); W WO	Izoria (GEO); W 27–21	Rzany (POL); W 24–23	Thomas (FRA); L 18–23	Did not advance	3rd place, bronze medalist(s)
Aghasi Mammadov	Bantamweight	Brunker (AUS); W RSC	Dalakliev (BUL); W 35–16	Tretyak (UKR); W 32–12	Petchkoom (THA); L 19–27	Did not advance	3rd place, bronze medalist(s)
Shahin Imranov	Featherweight	Galada (RSA); W RSC	Tichtchenko (RUS); L RSC	Did not advance			
Rovshan Huseynov	Lightweight	Mahlangu (RSA); W 22–14	Escobedo (USA); W 36–18	Kindelán (CUB); L 11–23	Did not advance		
Ruslan Khairov	Welterweight	Trupish (CAN); W RSC	Silamu (CHN); W 26–16	Aragón (CUB); L 14–16	Did not advance		
Javid Taghiyev	Middleweight	Gazis (GRE); W 32–31	Suriya (THA); L 19–19^{+}	Did not advance			
Ali Ismayilov	Light heavyweight	Silva (BRA); W 27–22	Pavlidis (GRE); L 16–31	Did not advance			
Vugar Alakbarov	Heavyweight	—N/a	Kladouchas (GRE); W 18–14	Al Shami (SYR); L DSQ	Did not advance		

== Fencing ==
Women

Athlete	Event	Round of 32	Round of 16	Quarterfinal	Semifinal	Final / BM	
Athlete	Event	Opposition Score	Opposition Score	Opposition Score	Opposition Score	Opposition Score	Rank
Yelena Jemayeva	Individual sabre	Pattaro (BRA); W 15–8	Marzocca (ITA); W 15–6	Zagunis (USA); L 11–15	Did not advance		7

== Gymnastics ==
=== Rhythmic ===
Dinara Gimatova, who qualified for the 2004 Olympics, could not compete due to a practice injury. She was replaced by Anna Gurbanova.

Athlete	Event	Qualification						Final					
Athlete	Event	Rope	Hoop	Clubs	Ribbon	Total	Rank	Rope	Hoop	Clubs	Ribbon	Total	Rank
Anna Gurbanova	Individual	22.775	23.525	22.800	23.200	92.300	14	Did not advance					

== Judo ==
Men

Athlete	Event	Round of 32	Round of 16	Quarterfinals	Semifinals	Repechage 1	Repechage 2	Repechage 3	Final / BM	
Athlete	Event	Opposition Result	Opposition Result	Opposition Result	Opposition Result	Opposition Result	Opposition Result	Opposition Result	Opposition Result	Rank
Elchin Ismayilov	−66 kg	Ungvári (HUN); L 0012–1010	Did not advance							
Mehman Azizov	−81 kg	Elmont (NED); W 1010–0001	Shundzikau (BLR); W 0010–0001	Krawczyk (POL); L 0000–1001	Did not advance	Bye	Hawn (USA); W 1000–0000	Wanner (GER); W 1000–0000	Nossov (RUS); L 0020–0100	5
Movlud Miraliyev	−100 kg	van der Geest (NED); L 0001–1011	Did not advance			El Gharbawy (EGY); W 1010–0000	Inoue (JPN); W 1011–0000	Zhitkeyev (KAZ); W 0021–0001	Jurack (GER); L 0001–1030	5

== Shooting ==
Women

Athlete	Event	Qualification		Final	
Athlete	Event	Points	Rank	Points	Rank
Irada Ashumova	10 m air pistol	386	2 Q	481.4	8
Irada Ashumova	25 m pistol	588	1 Q	687.3	3rd place, bronze medalist(s)
Zemfira Meftahatdinova	Skeet	71	2 Q	93	3rd place, bronze medalist(s)

== Swimming ==
Men

Athlete	Event	Heat		Semifinal		Final	
Athlete	Event	Time	Rank	Time	Rank	Time	Rank
Sergey Dyachkov	50 m freestyle	54.22	67	Did not advance			

Women

Athlete	Event	Heat		Semifinal		Final	
Athlete	Event	Time	Rank	Time	Rank	Time	Rank
Nataliya Filina	100 m breaststroke	1:20.21	44	Did not advance			

== Taekwondo ==
Athlete	Event	Round of 16	Quarterfinals	Semifinals	Repechage 1	Repechage 2	Final / BM	
Athlete	Event	Opposition Result	Opposition Result	Opposition Result	Opposition Result	Opposition Result	Opposition Result	Rank
Niyamaddin Pashayev	Men's −68 kg	Song M-S (KOR); L 13–15	Did not advance					
Rashad Ahmadov	Men's −80 kg	Osuji (TRI); W 10–3	Negrel (FRA); W 24–17	Tanrıkulu (TUR); L 6–6 SUP	Bye	Estrada (MEX); W 9–9 SUP	Karami (IRI); L 8–9	4

== Weightlifting ==
Athlete	Event	Snatch		Clean & Jerk		Total	Rank
Athlete	Event	Result	Rank	Result	Rank	Total	Rank
Asif Malikov	Men's −62 kg	115	=14	150	=11	265	12
Turan Mirzayev	Men's −69 kg	147.5	=4	185	4	332.5	4
Nizami Pashayev	Men's −94 kg	~~180~~	DNF	—	—	—	DNF
Alibay Samadov	Men's −94 kg	165	=16	195	15	360	15
Alan Naniyev	Men's −105 kg	190	4	220	4	410	6

== Wrestling ==
Key

- VT - Victory by Fall.
- PP - Decision by Points - the loser with technical points.
- PO - Decision by Points - the loser without technical points.

Men's freestyle

Athlete	Event	Elimination Pool			Quarterfinal	Semifinal	Final / BM	
Athlete	Event	Opposition Result	Opposition Result	Rank	Opposition Result	Opposition Result	Opposition Result	Rank
Namig Abdullayev	−55 kg	Tanabe (JPN); L 1–3 ^{PP}	Dutt (IND); W 3–1 ^{PP}	2	Did not advance			14
Elman Asgarov	−66 kg	Bodişteanu (MDA); W 3–1 ^{PP}	Kelly (USA); L 1–3 ^{PP}	2	Did not advance			12
Elnur Aslanov	−74 kg	Abdusalomov (TJK); L 1–3 ^{PP}	Igali (CAN); L 1–3 ^{PP}	3	Did not advance			15
Rustam Aghayev	−96 kg	Bairamukov (KAZ); W 3–1 ^{PP}	Jacobs (NAM); W 5–0 ^{VT}	1 Q	Heidari (IRI); L 0–3 ^{PO}	Did not advance	Wang Yy (CHN); W 5–0 ^{VT}	5

Men's Greco-Roman

Athlete	Event	Elimination Pool				Quarterfinal	Semifinal	Final / BM	
Athlete	Event	Opposition Result	Opposition Result	Opposition Result	Rank	Opposition Result	Opposition Result	Opposition Result	Rank
Vitaliy Rahimov	−60 kg	Zawadzki (POL); W 3–1 ^{PP}	Jung J-H (KOR); L 0–3 ^{PO}	—N/a	2	Did not advance			14
Farid Mansurov	−66 kg	Maren (CUB); W 3–0 ^{PO}	Wolny (POL); W 3–1 ^{PP}	—N/a	1 Q	Zeidvand (IRI); W 3–1 ^{PP}	Samuelsson (SWE); W 3–1 ^{PP}	Eroğlu (TUR); W 3–1 ^{PP}	1st place, gold medalist(s)
Vüqar Aslanov	−74 kg	Kolitsopoulos (GRE); L 1–3 ^{PP}	Dokturishvili (UZB); L 0–5 ^{VB}	Berzicza (HUN); L 0–3 ^{PO}	4	Did not advance			17

== See also ==
- Azerbaijan at the 2004 Summer Paralympics
