= Hrachik Javakhyan =

Armenian boxer

Medal record

Representing Armenia

Men's Boxing

Olympic Games
Bronze medal – third place	2008 Beijing	Lightweight

European Amateur Championships
Gold medal – first place	2010 Moscow	Light welterweight
Silver medal – second place	2006 Plovdiv	Lightweight

Hrachik Javakhyan (Armenian: Հրաչիկ Ջավախյան, born on July 6, 1984, in Vanadzor, Armenian SSR) is an Armenian boxer best known to win gold at the 2010 European Amateur Boxing Championships and bronze at the 2008 Summer Olympics. He was awarded the Honored Master of Sports of Armenia title in 2009.

== Career ==
Javakhyan began boxing at the age of 14 under honored coach of Armenia, Gevorg Misakyan. Since 2005, he has been a member of the national team of Armenia.

Javakhyan advanced all the wy to the finals at the 2006 European Amateur Boxing Championships where he met reigning Olympic and World Champion Aleksei Tishchenko. Hrachik was defeated and won the silver medal.

The following year, Javakhyan qualified for the 2008 Summer Olympics by reaching the quarterfinals at the 2007 World Amateur Boxing Championships.

In 2008, at the Olympic Games, Javakhyan received a first round bye, defeated Rasheed Lawal in the second round without losing a point and had a walkover against Jong Sub-Baik. In the semifinals, Javakhyan faced Tishchenko again. Although he put up a better challenge than before, Javakhyan ultimately lost. Javakhyan was awarded an Olympic bronze medal, the first Olympic medal ever won by a boxer from the independent Armenia.

Javakhyan won a gold medal at the 2010 European Amateur Boxing Championships.

=== Olympic Games Results ===
2008

- 1st round bye
- Defeated Rasheed Lawal (Nigeria) 12-0
- Defeated Jong Sub-Baik (South Korea) WO
- Lost to Aleksei Tishchenko (Russia) 5-10

=== World Amateur Championships Results ===
2005

- Lost to Ibrahim Kamal (Canada) 18-29

2007

- Defeated Aivars Romanovskis (Latvia) 17-14
- Defeated Sadam Ali (United States) 20-16
- Defeated Genebert Basadre (Philippines) 17-6
- Lost to Domenico Valentino (Italy) 12-27

2009

- Defeated Aivars Romanovskis (Bulgaria) 11-1
- Lost to Éverton Lopes (Brazil) 3-10

2011

- Defeated David Mueller (Germany) 17-11
- Lost to Zdeněk Chládek (Czech Republic) 6-10

=== European Championships Results ===
2006

- Defeated Ovidiu Bobirnat (Cyprus) 34-17
- Defeated Krzysztof Szot (Poland) 20-10
- Defeated Vazgen Safaryants (Belarus) 25-16
- Lost to Aleksei Tishchenko (Russia) 15-39

2010

- Defeated Alex Vasiljev (Finland) 11-2
- Defeated Georgian Popescu (Romania) 9-3
- Defeated David Mueller (Germany) 5-3
- Defeated Olexandr Klyuchko (Ukraine) 5-1
- Defeated Gyula Kate (Hungary) 3-2
