= Saifeddine Nejmaoui =

Tunisian boxer (born 1981)

Medal record

Representing Tunisia

Men's Boxing

All-Africa Games
Gold medal – first place	2007 Algiers	Lightweight

Saifeddine Nejmaoui (born May 5, 1981) is a Tunisian boxer who won the lightweight division at the 2007 All-Africa Games and competed at the 2004 and 2008 Olympic Games.

In Athens 2004 he lost his first match to Frenchman Khedafi Djelkhir (13:38). He qualified for the Athens Games by winning the gold medal at the 1st AIBA African 2004 Olympic Qualifying Tournament in Casablanca, Morocco. In the final of the event he defeated Uganda's Brian Mayanja.

Nejmaoui won the African Championships in 2005. At the All-Africa Games he won the lightweight title in Algiers defeating Owethu Mbira in the semis. At the African Olympic qualification tournament for the 2008 Summer Olympics, he won all his matches, including a victory over Morocco's Hamza Kramou. His draw at the 2008 Olympic Games matched him with reigning Olympic Featherweight Champion Aleksei Tishchenko and he lost on points (2:10).

== Results ==
Division	Opponent	W/L	Score
2004 Olympic Games in Athens, Greece
– 57 kg	Khedafi Djelkhir (FRA)	L	13 – 38
2005 African Championships in Casablanca, Morocco
– 57 kg	Mewoli Abdon (CMR)	W	RSCO
– 57 kg	Hadj Belkhir (ALG)	W	24 – 4
– 57 kg	Sifeddine Nejmaoui (MAR)	W	30 – 16
2005 World Cup in Moscow, Russia
– 60 kg	Konstantine Kupatadze (GEO)	W	35 – 24
– 60 kg	Serik Sapiyev (KAZ)	L	KO-1
2007 All-Africa Games in Algiers, Algeria
– 60 kg	Achille Apie (CMR)	W	21 – 8
– 60 kg	Julius Indonyo (NAM)	W	14 – 7
– 60 kg	Owethu Mbira (RSA)	W	19 – 12
– 60 kg	Yassin Al-Sheairy (EGY)	W	+12 – 12
2008 AIBA African Olympic Qualifying Tournament in Algiers, Algeria
– 60 kg	Gaolatlhe Mpotsang (BOT)	W	18 – 5
– 60 kg	Frederik Lawson (GHA)	W	19 – 7
– 60 kg	Hamza Kramou (ALG)	W	11 – 4
2008 Olympic Games in Beijing, PR China
– 60 kg	Aleksei Tishchenko (RUS)	L	2 – 10
