= 2nd AIBA European 2004 Olympic Qualifying Tournament =

The 2nd AIBA European 2004 Olympic Qualifying Tournament was held in Warsaw, Poland from March 30 to April 4, 2004 at the annual Feliks Stamm Boxing Tournament. The top two boxers in each weight category gained entry into the 2004 Summer Olympics.

== Medal winners ==
Event	Gold	Silver	Bronze
Flyweight (– 51 kilograms)	Bato-Munko Vankeev (BLR)	Jérôme Thomas (FRA)	Igor Samoilenco (MDA) Vincenzo Picardi (ITA)
Featherweight (– 57 kilograms)	Aleksei Tishchenko (RUS)	Shahin Imranov (AZE)	Alexey Shaydulin (BUL) Marius Narkevicius (LTU)
Light Welterweight (– 64 kilograms)	Patrick Bogere (SWE)	Michele di Rocco (ITA)	Boris Georgiev (BUL) Paul McCloskey (IRL)
Middleweight (– 75 kilograms)	Marian Simion (ROU)	Oleh Mashkin (UKR)	Aleksander Rubiuk (EST) Dmitry Usagin (BUL)
Heavyweight (– 91 kilograms)	Vugar Alakbarov (AZE)	Daniel Betti (ITA)	Spyridon Kladouchas (GRE) Vitali Michnienko (UKR)

== Qualified ==
=== Flyweight (– 51 kg) ===
- Bato-Munko Vankeev (BLR)
- Jérôme Thomas (FRA)

=== Featherweight (– 57 kg) ===
- Aleksei Tishchenko (RUS)
- Shahin Imranov (AZE)

=== Light Welterweight (– 64 kg) ===
- Patrick Bogere (SWE)
- Michele di Rocco (ITA)

=== Middleweight (– 75 kg) ===
- Marian Simion (ROU)
- Oleh Mashkin (UKR)

=== Heavyweight (– 91 kg) ===
- Vugar Alakbarov (AZE)
- Daniel Betti (ITA)

== See also ==
- 2004 European Amateur Boxing Championships
- 1st AIBA European 2004 Olympic Qualifying Tournament
- 3rd AIBA European 2004 Olympic Qualifying Tournament
- 4th AIBA European 2004 Olympic Qualifying Tournament
