= Vitali Tajbert =

German boxer

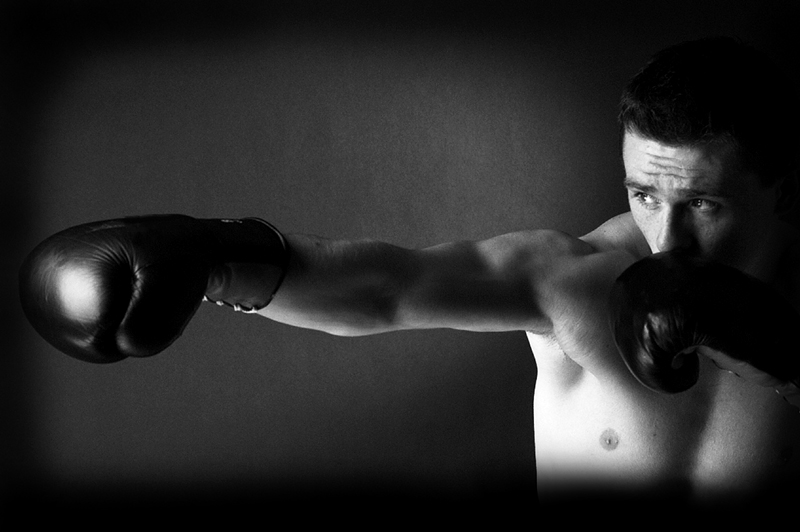

Personal information
- Nationality: German
- Born: 25 May 1982 (age 44) Mikhaylovka, Kazakh SSR, Soviet Union
- Height: 5 ft 5.5 in (166 cm)
- Weight: Super-featherweight

Boxing career
- Stance: Orthodox

Boxing record
- Total fights: 26
- Wins: 24
- Win by KO: 6
- Losses: 2
Medal record
Men's amateur boxing
Representing Germany
Olympic Games
Bronze medal – third place	2004 Athens	Featherweight
World Championships
Silver medal – second place	2003 Bangkok	Featherweight
European Championships
Gold medal – first place	2004 Pula	Featherweight

Vitali Tajbert (born 25 May 1982) is a German former professional boxer who competed from 2005 to 2013. He held the WBC super-featherweight title in 2010 (having held the interim title from 2009 to 2010) and the European Union title in 2008. As an amateur, he won a silver medal at the 2003 World Championships, a gold medal at the 2004 European Championships, and a bronze medal at the 2004 Summer Olympics, all in the featherweight division.

== Amateur results ==
- 1999 won a bronze medal at the Junior European Championships in Rijeka, Croatia at Bantamweight.
- 2000 won the gold medal at the Junior World Championships in Budapest at Bantamweight.
  - Defeated Yuguang Zhang (China) RSC-2
  - Defeated Yusni Barzaga (Cuba) PTS (27-13)
  - Defeated Yevgeni Kybalyuk (Ukraine) PTS (19-8)
  - Defeated Haruyton Tovmasyan (Armenia) PTS (15-6)
  - Defeated Murat Chrachev (Russia) PTS (23-3)
- 2001 represented Germany at the 2001 World Amateur Boxing Championships in Belfast at Bantamweight.
  - Lost to Afansy Poskachine (Russia) PTS (9-10)
- 2002 represented Germany at the European Championships in Perm, Russia. Result was:
  - Lost to Waldemar Cucereanu (Romania) PTS (15-29)
- 2003 won the silver medal at the 2003 World Amateur Boxing Championships in Bangkok at Featherweight.
  - Defeated Cheng Tong Shou (China) RSCI
  - Defeated Bekzod Chidrov (Uzbekistan) PTS (26-14)
  - Defeated Oleg Jefimovich (Ukraine) PTS (35-19)
  - Defeated Abdusalom Khasanov (Tajikistan) PTS (19-17)
  - Lost to Galib Jafarov (Kazachstan) PTS (35-43)
- 2004 won the gold medal at the European Championships 2004 in Pula, Croatia at Featherweight.
  - Defeated Sedat Tasci (Turkey) PTS (48-13)
  - Defeated Viorel Simion (Romania) PTS (65-41)
  - Defeated Mikhail Bernadski (Belarus) PTS (45-24)
  - Defeated Khedafi Djelkhir (France) RSCO-3
- 2004 won a bronze medal representing Germany at the 2004 Summer Olympics in Athens at Featherweight.
  - Defeated Daniel Brizuela (Argentina) RSCO-3
  - Defeated Khedafi Djelkhir (France) PTS (40-26)
  - Defeated Luis Franco (Cuba) PTS (34-26)
  - Lost to Song Guk Kim (North Korea) PTS (24-29)
- 2005 won the gold medal at the Military World Championships in Pretoria at Featherweight.
  - Defeated V. Anghel (Romania) PTS (24-5)
  - Defeated Y. Uruzbayev (Kazachstan) PTS (24-12)
  - Defeated Thongtheang Khlongchan (Thailand) PTS (30-28)
  - Defeated Sergej Ignatyev (Russia) PTS (25-14)

== Professional career ==
Tajbert turned professional in 2005 and compiled a record of 18-1 before facing and defeating Mexican boxer Humberto Mauro Gutiérrez, to win the WBC interim Super Featherweight title. Tajbert was promoted to full champion after Humberto Soto won the WBC lightweight title. Tajbert lost the title in his second defence to Japanese boxer Takahiro Ao.

== Professional boxing record ==
26 fights	24 wins	2 losses
By knockout	6	0
By decision	18	2

No.	Result	Record	Opponent	Type	Round, time	Date	Location	Notes
26	Win	24–2	Mikheil Avakyan	UD	6	24 Aug 2013	Warsteiner HockeyPark, Mönchengladbach, Germany	
25	Win	23–2	Michael Dufek	UD	6	12 Oct 2012	Sporthalle Wandsbek, Hamburg, Germany	
24	Win	22–2	Jose Luis Graterol	UD	8	28 Jan 2012	Grand Elysée, Hamburg, Germany	
23	Win	21–2	Andrey Kostin	UD	6	24 Sep 2011	Dima-Sportcenter, Hamburg, Germany	
22	Loss	20–2	Takahiro Ao	UD	12	26 Nov 2010	Nihon Gaishi Hall, Nagoya, Japan	Lost WBC super-featherweight title
21	Win	20–1	Héctor Velázquez	TD	9 (12), 1:35	22 May 2010	StadtHalle, Rostock, Germany	Retained WBC super-featherweight title; Unanimous TD: Tajbert cut from accidental head clash
20	Win	19–1	Humberto Mauro Gutiérrez	UD	12	21 Nov 2009	Sparkassen-Arena, Kiel, Germany	Won WBC interim super-featherweight title
19	Win	18–1	Rudy Encarnacion	UD	6	6 Jun 2009	König Pilsener Arena, Oberhausen, Germany	
18	Loss	17–1	Sergey Gulyakevich	UD	12	5 Dec 2008	Sporthalle Brandberge, Halle, Germany	For European super-featherweight title
17	Win	17–0	Ermano Fegatilli	UD	8	29 Aug 2008	Burg-Waechter Castello, Düsseldorf, Germany	
16	Win	16–0	Antonio Joao Bento	UD	12	5 Jul 2008	Gerry Weber Stadion, Halle, Germany	Retained European Union super-featherweight title
15	Win	15–0	Jesus Garcia Escalona	UD	12	29 Feb 2008	Alsterdorfer Sporthalle, Hamburg, Germany	Won European Union super-featherweight title
14	Win	14–0	Youssouf Djibaba	TKO	10 (10), 2:51	7 Dec 2007	Alsterdorfer Sporthalle, Hamburg, Germany	
13	Win	13–0	Petr Petrov	UD	8	20 Oct 2007	Gerry Weber Stadion, Halle, Germany	
12	Win	12–0	Younes Amrani	TKO	7 (8), 1:00	28 Jul 2007	Burg-Waechter Castello, Düsseldorf, Germany	
11	Win	11–0	Jairo Moura dos Santos	UD	8	30 Mar 2007	Kolnarena, Cologne, Germany	
10	Win	10–0	Alessandro Di Meco	TKO	1 (6), 2:00	16 Feb 2007	Fight Night Arena, Cologne, Germany	
9	Win	9–0	Kirkor Kirkorov	UD	6	5 Dec 2006	Freizeit Arena, Sölden, Austria	
8	Win	8–0	Fabian Valentin Martinez	UD	6	21 Nov 2006	Universum Gym, Hamburg, Germany	
7	Win	7–0	Wladimir Borov	UD	6	19 Sep 2006	Kugelbake-Halle, Cuxhaven, Germany	
6	Win	6–0	Adolphe Avadja	UD	4	29 Jul 2006	König Pilsener Arena, Oberhausen, Germany	
5	Win	5–0	Pablo Ernesto Oliveto	UD	6	27 May 2006	Zenith - Die Kulturhalle, Munich, Germany	
4	Win	4–0	Dzmitri Rabikau	KO	1 {4), 1:11	29 Apr 2006	Hanns-Martin-Schleyer-Halle, Stuttgart, Germany	
3	Win	3–0	Alain Rakow	UD	4	28 Feb 2006	Alte Reithalle, Stuttgart, Germany	
2	Win	2–0	Julio Borges	KO	1 (4), 2:15	7 Jan 2006	Zenith - Die Kulturhalle, Munich, Germany	
1	Win	1–0	Robert Zsemberi	KO	1 (4), 2:25	3 Dec 2005	Bordelandhalle, Magdeburg, Germany	

== Personal life ==
Tajbert and his family migrated from Kazakhstan as ethnic Germans to Stuttgart in 1992.

== See also ==
- List of world super-featherweight boxing champions

Sporting positions
Regional boxing titles
Preceded by Jesus Garcia Escalona	EBU super-featherweight champion 29 February 2008 – October 2008; Vacated	Vacant Title next held by Devis Boschiero
World boxing titles
Preceded by Humberto Mauro Gutiérrez	WBC super-featherweight champion Interim title 21 November 2009 – 18 March 2010; Promoted	Vacant
Preceded by Humberto Soto vacated	WBC super-featherweight champion 18 March 2010 – 26 November 2010	Succeeded by Takahiro Aoh
