= Sergey Rozhnov =

Bulgarian boxer

Personal information
- Nationality: Russian
- Born: Сергей Сергеевич Рожнов; 19 September 1982 (age 43) Moscow, Russia
- Height: 6 ft 2 1/2 in (189 cm)
- Weight: Heavyweight

Boxing career
- Stance: Southpaw

Boxing record
- Total fights: 1
- Wins: 1
- Losses: 0
Medal record
Men's amateur boxing
Representing Bulgaria
European Championships
| Bronze medal – third place | 2004 Pula | Super heavyweight |

Sergey Rozhnov (Bulgarian: Сергей Рожнов; born 19 September 1982 in Moscow, Russia) is a Russian former professional boxer who competed during 2012. He defeated former heavyweight world title challenger Owen Beck in his only professional bout. As an amateur, Rozhnov represented Bulgaria at the 2004 Olympics and won a super-heavyweight bronze medal at the 2004 European Amateur Boxing Championships.

== Amateur career ==
He participated in the 2004 Summer Olympics. There he was stopped in the first round of the Super heavyweight (+91 kg) division by Russia's eventual winner Alexander Povetkin.

Rozhnov won a bronze medal in the same division six months earlier, at the 2004 European Amateur Boxing Championships in Pula, Croatia.

== Professional boxing record ==
| 1 fight | 1 win | 0 losses |
|---|---|---|
| By decision | 1 | 0 |

| No. | Result | Record | Opponent | Type | Round, time | Date | Location | Notes |
|---|---|---|---|---|---|---|---|---|
| 1 | Win | 1–0 | (Jamaica) Owen Beck | UD | 4 | 8 Feb 2012 | Krylia Sovetov, Moscow, Russia | Professional debut |
