= Ludumo Galada =

South African boxer

Personal information
- Nickname: Pretty Boy
- Nationality: South African
- Born: 16 November 1995 East London, South Africa
- Died: 11 January 2009 (aged 26) near Aliwal North, South Africa
- Height: 5 ft 8 in (173 cm)
- Weight: Featherweight

Boxing career
- Stance: Orthodox

Boxing record
- Total fights: 16
- Wins: 16
- Win by KO: 8
Medal record
Men's amateur boxing
Representing South Africa
African Championships
Bronze medal – third place	2001 Port Louis	54 kg
Commonwealth Championships
Bronze medal – third place	2003 Kuala Lumpur	57 kg
Zone 6 African Championships
Gold medal – first place	2005 Bloemfontein	60 kg
Silver medal – second place	2002

Ludumo Galada (20 December 1982 – 11 January 2009) was a South African professional boxer who competed from 2005 to 2009. As an amateur, he competed at the 2002 Commonwealth Games, the 2003 World Championships and the 2004 Summer Olympics. He also won a bronze medal at the 2001 African Championships.

== Career ==
Nicknamed "Pretty Boy", Galada was born in Mdantsane Township outside of East London in the Eastern Cape province. He began boxing at the age of ten out of curiosity and won his first medal the following year.

Galada represented South Africa at the 2002 Commonwealth Games where he fought as a bantamweight. Galada advanced to the quarterfinals where he lost to Ezekiel Letuka of Lesotho. He qualified for the 2004 Summer Olympics, where he fought as a featherweight. He lost in the 3rd round of his only match to Azerbaijan's Shahin Imranov. His final amateur record was 151–7–1 (102 KO).

After turning pro in 2005, he won the South African title in 2007 and successfully defended it 3 times. In early morning of 11 January 2009, while returning home visiting his sick brother in Johannesburg, Galada was killed in a car crash in Aliwal North in the Eastern Cape.

== Professional boxing record ==
16 fights	16 wins	0 losses
By knockout	8	0
By decision	8	0

No.	Result	Record	Opponent	Type	Round, time	Date	Location	Notes
16	Win	16–0	(Mexico) Pedro Navarrete	TKO	2 (12)	22 Nov 2008	Mdantsane Indoor Centre, Mdantsane, South Africa	Retained WBF featherweight title
15	Win	15–0	(Kenya) David Kiilu	KO	1 (12), 2:28	22 Aug 2008	Mdantsane Indoor Centre, Mdantsane, South Africa	Won vacant WBF featherweight title
14	Win	14–0	(South Africa) Themba Tshicila	TKO	4 (12)	27 Apr 2008	Orient Theatre, East London, South Africa	Retained South African featherweight title
13	Win	13–0	(South Africa) Edward Mpofu	UD	12	16 Nov 2007	Nongoza Jebe Hall, Port Elizabeth, South Africa	Retained South African featherweight title
12	Win	12–0	(South Africa) Thando Vukuza	TKO	8 (12), 2:38	27 Jul 2007	Mdantsane Indoor Centre, Mdantsane, South Africa	Retained South African featherweight title
11	Win	11–0	(South Africa) Sydney Maluleka	UD	12	3 Feb 2007	Emperors Palace, Kempton Park, South Africa	Won vacant South African featherweight title
10	Win	10–0	(South Africa) Mthuthuzeli Ningi	TKO	3 (6)	22 Sep 2006	Orient Theatre, East London, South Africa	
9	Win	9–0	(South Africa) Lungisa Jikani	TKO	3 (10)	1 Jul 2006	Mdantsane Indoor Centre, Mdantsane, South Africa	Won vacant Eastern Cape featherweight title
8	Win	8–0	(South Africa) Takalani Kwinda	UD	6	7 Apr 2006	Orient Theatre, East London, South Africa	
7	Win	7–0	(South Africa) Thando Vukuza	PTS	4	27 Jan 2006	Southern Suburbs Recreation Cent, Johannesburg, South Africa	
6	Win	6–0	(South Africa) Thamsanqa Dubase	PTS	4	10 Dec 2005	Bankuna School Hall, Tzaneen, South Africa	
5	Win	5–0	(South Africa) Moses Mahase	KO	1 (4)	3 Dec 2005	Uitenhage, South Africa	
4	Win	4–0	(South Africa) Marcel Japhta	PTS	4	19 Nov 2005	Thabong Community Hall, Welkom, South Africa	
3	Win	3–0	(South Africa) Samkelo Tutu	TKO	1 (4)	5 Nov 2005	OR Tambo Hall, Mthatha, South Africa	
2	Win	2–0	(South Africa) Thando Vukuza	PTS	4	4 Sep 2005	Mdantsane Indoor Centre, Mdantsane, South Africa	
1	Win	1–0	(South Africa) Xolani Lumkhwana	PTS	4	30 Apr 2005	Mdantsane Indoor Centre, Mdantsane, South Africa	
