= Khedafi Djelkhir =

French boxer (born 1983)

Khédafi Djelkhir
Personal information
- Full name: Khédafi Djelkhir
- Nationality: French
- Born: October 26, 1983 (age 42) Besançon, Doubs
- Height: 1.64 m (5 ft 5 in)
- Weight: 57 kg (126 lb)

Sport
- Sport: Boxing
- Weight class: Featherweight
- Club: Futuris Boxing Club Besançon
Medal record
Olympic Games
Silver medal – second place	2008 Beijing	Featherweight
European Amateur Championships
Silver medal – second place	2004 Pula	Featherweight
EU Amateur Championships
Gold medal – first place	2007 Dublin	Featherweight
Bronze medal – third place	2004 Madrid	Featherweight

Khédafi Djelkhir, or sometimes Khesafi Djelkhir, (born 26 October 1983) is a French featherweight amateur boxer of Algerian origin. He qualified for the 2008 Summer Olympics and won a silver medal at the 2004 European Championships.

== Career ==
Djelkhir won a silver medal at featherweight at the 2004 European Amateur Boxing Championships in Pula, Croatia losing to Vitali Tajbert.

He participated in the 2004 Summer Olympics. There, he was defeated in the second round of the featherweight (57 kg) division again by Germany's eventual bronze medalist Vitali Tajbert.

Djelkhir qualified for the 2008 Olympics by beating English boxer Stephen Smith in the semi final of a European qualifying tournament. At the Olympics, he reached the finals where he lost to Ukrainian southpaw Vasyl Lomachenko.

=== Olympic Games ===
2004 (featherweight)

- Defeated Saifeddine Nejmaoui (Tunisia) 38–13
- Lost to Vitali Tajbert (Germany) 26–40

2008 (featherweight)

- Defeated Paul Fleming (Australia) 13–9
- Defeated Raynell Williams (United States) 9–7
- Defeated Arturo Santos Reyes (Mexico) 14–9
- Defeated Shahin Imranov (Azerbaijan) Retired at the end of the 1st round with an arm injury, with Imranov leading 5–2.
- Defeated by Vasyl Lomachenko (Ukraine) 9–1 RSC 1 (2:51)

=== World Championships ===
2005 (featherweight)

- Lost to Mehrullah Lassi (Pakistan) 12–38

2007 (featherweight)

- Lost to Raynell Williams (United States) 18-28
