= Dimitar Shtilianov =

Bulgarian boxer

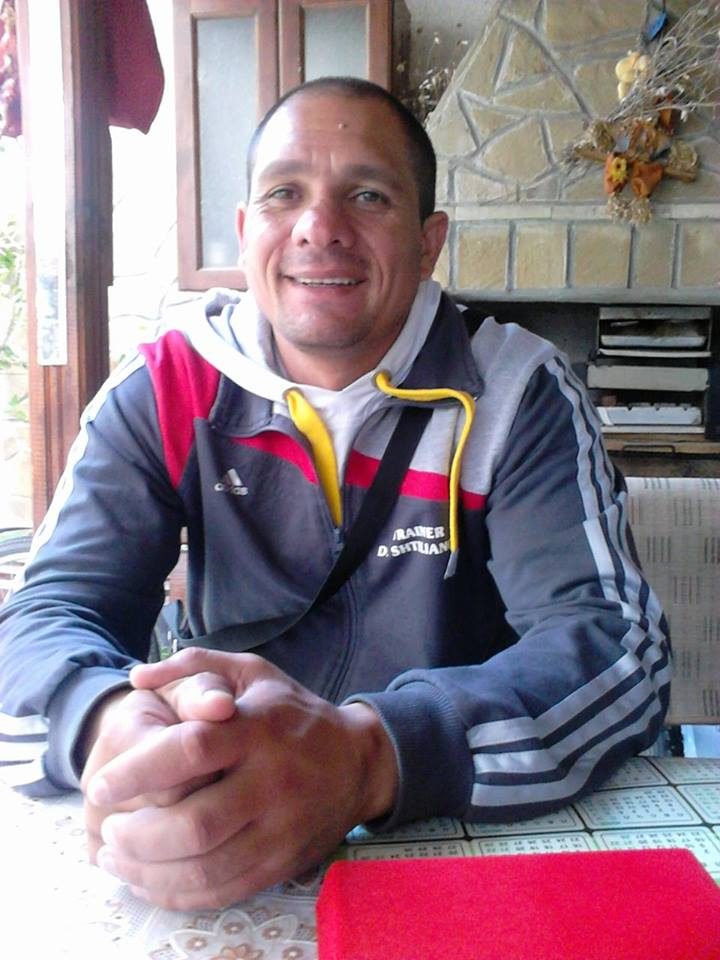

Personal information
- Born: Dimitar Shtiliyanov Panayotov; 17 July 1976 (age 50) Sliven, Bulgaria
Medal record
Men's Boxing
Representing Bulgaria
World Amateur Championships
Silver medal – second place	2001 Belfast	Light Welterweight
Bronze medal – third place	1999 Houston	Lightweight
European Amateur Championships
Gold medal – first place	2002 Perm	Light Welterweight
Gold medal – first place	2004 Pula	Lightweight
Silver medal – second place	2000 Tampere	Light Welterweight

Dimitar Panayotov Shtilianov or Shtilyanov (Bulgarian: Димитър Панайотов Щилянов; born 17 July 1976) is boxer from Bulgaria.

He won a bronze medal at the 1999 World Amateur Boxing Championships in Houston, Texas. Two years later, at the 2001 World Amateur Boxing Championships, he won the silver medal in the Light Welterweight (– 63,5 kg) and won the gold medal at the 2002 European Amateur Boxing Championships.

Shtilianov represented for Bulgaria at the 2004 Summer Olympics in Athens, Greece. In February of that year he won the title at the 2004 European Amateur Boxing Championships in Pula, Croatia.

== Olympic results ==
- Defeated Selçuk Aydın (Turkey) 20–11
- Lost to Amir Khan (Great Britain) 21-37
