= Hadj Belkheir =

Algerian boxer (born 1977)

Medal record

Representing Algeria

Men's Boxing

All-Africa Games
Gold medal – first place	2003 Abuja	Featherweight

Hadj Belkheir (born 12 May 1977 in Relizane) is an Algerian boxer, who represented his country at the 2004 Summer Olympics. He competed in the Featherweight (57 kg) division but was eliminated in the first round after losing to Russia's eventual winner Alexei Tichtchenko.

Belkheir won the gold medal in the same division one year earlier, at the All-Africa Games in Abuja, Nigeria.
