= Nikoloz Izoria =

Georgian boxer (born 1985)

Personal information
- Full name: ნიკოლოზ იზორია
- Nationality: Georgia
- Born: August 31, 1985 (age 40) Poti, Samegrelo-Zemo Svaneti, Georgian SSR, Soviet Union
- Height: 1.75 m (5 ft 9 in)
- Weight: 54 kg (119 lb)

Sport
- Sport: Boxing
- Weight class: Flyweight
Medal record
European Amateur Championships
Silver medal – second place	2004 Pula	Flyweight

Nikoloz Izoria (Georgian: ნიკოლოზ იზორია) (born August 31, 1985) is a boxer from Georgia.

He participated in the 2004 Summer Olympics for his native country. There he was stopped in the second round of the Flyweight (51 kg) division by Azerbaijan's eventual bronze medalist Fuad Aslanov.

Izoria had won the silver medal in the same division six months earlier, at the 2004 European Amateur Boxing Championships in Pula, Croatia.

At the 2008 Olympics he beat Botswana's Thato Batshegi 14:4 but lost to Azerbaijan's Shahin Imranov 9:18.
