= Luis Franco (boxer) =

Cuban boxer (born 1982)

Luis Franco Vazquez (born January 14, 1982) is a Cuban pro boxer best known for participating at the 2004 Summer Olympics in the featherweight division (– 57 kg).

== Amateur ==
Franco won the junior world championships in 2000 at the age of 18. He lost the 2003 national bantamweight final to Guillermo Rigondeaux and went up to featherweight.

In 2004 he lost the national featherweight final to Exer Rodriguez but was sent to the Olympics anyway where he lost to Vitali Tajbert. He qualified for the Olympic Games by ending up in first place at the 1st AIBA American 2004 Olympic Qualifying Tournament in Tijuana, Mexico. Prior to the Athens Games he won the 2004 Acropolis Boxing Cup in Athens, Greece by defeating Turkey's Sedat Tasci in the final of the featherweight division.

In 2005 he became national featherweight champion, in 2006 he defeated a young Cuban boxer but lost the final to Yuriolkis Gamboa, in 2007 he lost early to Iván Onate.

In 2008 he went up to lightweight where he lost the quarterfinal to world star Yordenis Ugás.

== Pro ==
He defected in 2009 and has turned pro.

His most recent win was on December 3, 2010, when he defeated Eric Hunter by disqualification to win the vacant WBO Inter-Continental Super Featherweight title.
