= Serdar Üstüner =

Turkish boxer (born 1983)

Personal information
- Full name: Serdar Üstüner
- Nationality: Turkey
- Born: March 1, 1983 (age 43)
- Height: 1.75 m (5 ft 9 in)
- Weight: 75 kg (165 lb)

Sport
- Sport: Boxing
- Weight class: Middleweight
Medal record
EU Championships
Gold medal – first place	2003 Strasbourg	Middleweight

Serdar Üstüner (born March 1, 1983) is a boxer from Turkey. He boxed for the Turkey in the 2004 Summer Olympics where he was stopped in the first round of the Men's Middleweight (75 kg) division by Uzbekistan's Sherzod Abdurahmonov. He qualified for the Athens Games by ending up in second place at the 3rd AIBA European 2004 Olympic Qualifying Tournament in Gothenburg, Sweden. In the final he lost to Hungary's Károly Balzsay.
