= Tommy Coyle (boxer) =

British boxer (born 1989)

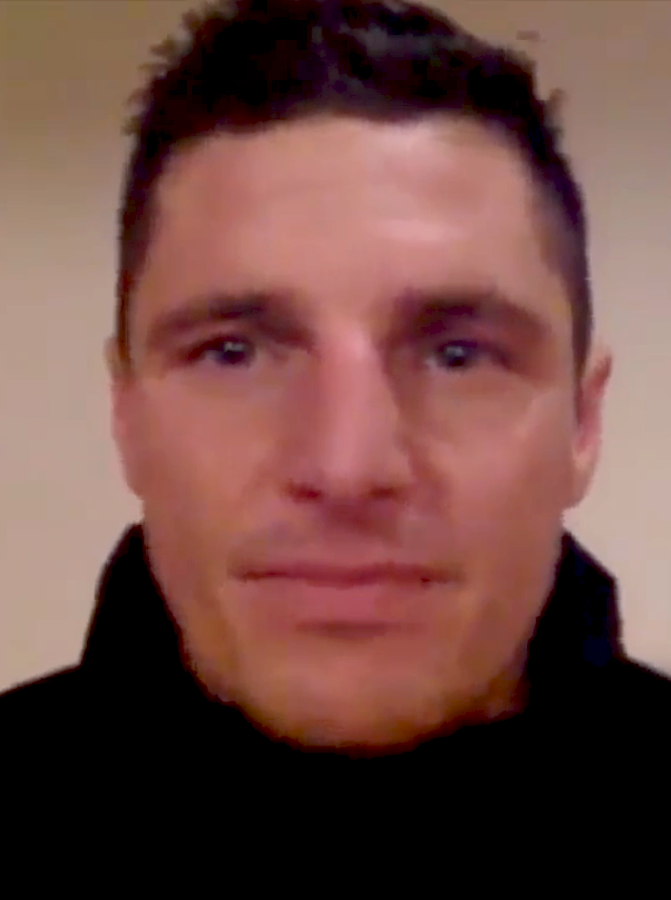
- Coyle in 2014

Personal information
- Nickname: Boom Boom
- Born: 2 September 1989 (age 37) Kingston upon Hull, England
- Height: 5 ft 7 in (170 cm)
- Weight: Lightweight; Light-welterweight

Boxing career
- Stance: Orthodox

Boxing record
- Total fights: 30
- Wins: 25
- Win by KO: 12
- Losses: 5

Tommy Coyle (born 2 September 1989) is a British former professional boxer who competed from 2009 to 2019. He held the Commonwealth lightweight title in 2018, and has challenged once for the British light-welterweight title in 2016. He is the older brother of Hull City footballer Lewie Coyle.

== Professional career ==
Coyle made his professional debut on 18 September 2009, winning a six-round points decision against Kristian Laight. On 6 October 2012, having won his first 13 fights, Coyle lost a three-round unanimous decision to Gary Sykes in the quarter-finals of the Prizefighter lightweight tournament. Coyle suffered his second professional defeat to Derry Mathews on 13 July 2013, losing by a 10th round stoppage in a fight for the Commonwealth lightweight title.

Two of Coyle's best wins came in 2014, beginning with a last-round stoppage over Daniel Brizuela on 22 February, in what was named a Fight of the Year candidate by ESPN, and Round of the Year by The Ring magazine. This was followed up on 25 October with a knockout of Michael Katsidis in two rounds.

=== Coyle vs. Campbell ===
These two fights helped set up a showdown with fellow Hull native and 2012 Olympic gold medallist Luke Campbell, with their highly anticipated fight eventually taking place on 1 August 2015. After being knocked down four times, Coyle was stopped in the tenth round.

=== Coyle vs. Nurse ===
After moving up to light-welterweight and scoring a points decision victory over Reynaldo Mora, Coyle challenged British champion Tyrone Nurse. Coyle lost a closely contested unanimous decision despite knocking Nurse down in the seventh round.

=== Coyle vs. Dodd ===
On 21 April 2018, Coyle fought Sean Dodd for the Commonwealth Boxing Council|Commonwealth lightweight title. Coyle managed to stop Dodd in the sixth round and win the belt.

=== Coyle vs. Algieri ===
On 1 June 2019, Coyle fought Chris Algieri, ranked #5 by the WBO at super lightweight, on the Anthony Joshua vs Andy Ruiz Jr undercard. After an entertaining first half of the fight, Algieri battered Coyle in the eighth round, which prompted Coyle's corner to pull him from the fight, awarding Algieri the victory.

=== Retirement ===
Coyle announced his retirement from professional boxing in January 2020.

== Professional boxing record ==
30 fights	25 wins	5 losses
By knockout	12	3
By decision	13	2

No.	Result	Record	Opponent	Type	Round, time	Date	Location	Notes
30	Loss	25–5	Chris Algieri	RTD	8 (12), 3:00	1 Jun 2019	Madison Square Garden, New York City, New York, US	For WBO International light-welterweight title
29	Win	25–4	Ryan Kielczweski	UD	10	20 Oct 2018	TD Garden, Boston, Massachusetts, US	
28	Win	24–4	Sean Dodd	TKO	6 (12), 2:13	21 Apr 2018	Echo Arena, Liverpool, England	Won Commonwealth lightweight title
27	Win	23–4	Rakeem Noble	TKO	3 (10), 0:28	25 Feb 2017	Ice Arena, Hull, England	
26	Loss	22–4	Tyrone Nurse	UD	12	30 Jul 2016	First Direct Arena, Leeds, England	For British light-welterweight title
25	Win	22–3	Reynaldo Mora	PTS	6	7 May 2016	Manchester Arena, Manchester, England	
24	Loss	21–3	Luke Campbell	TKO	10 (12), 1:41	1 Aug 2015	Craven Park, Hull, England	For vacant WBC International lightweight title
23	Win	21–2	Martin Gethin	RTD	5 (12), 3:00	7 Mar 2015	Ice Arena, Hull, England	
22	Win	20–2	Michael Katsidis	TKO	2 (12), 1:33	25 Oct 2014	Ice Arena, Hull, England	Retained IBF International lightweight title
21	Win	19–2	Michael Ansah	PTS	8	21 May 2014	First Direct Arena, Leeds, England	
20	Win	18–2	Daniel Brizuela	TKO	12 (12), 1:07	22 Feb 2014	Ice Arena, Hull, England	Retained IBF International lightweight title
19	Win	17–2	John Simpson	TKO	7 (12), 2:02	2 Nov 2013	Ice Arena, Hull, England	Won vacant IBF International lightweight title
18	Win	16–2	William Warburton	PTS	4	27 Sep 2013	Elland Road Banqueting Suite, Leeds, England	
17	Loss	15–2	Derry Mathews	TKO	10 (12), 2:41	13 Jul 2013	Craven Park, Hull, England	For vacant Commonwealth lightweight title
16	Win	15–1	Jay Morris	TKO	4 (4), 2:03	20 Apr 2013	Winter Gardens, Blackpool, England	
15	Win	14–1	Antonio João Bento	TKO	1 (10), 0:52	2 Nov 2012	City Hall, Hull, England	Won vacant WBC International Silver lightweight title
14	Loss	13–1	Gary Sykes	UD	3	6 Oct 2012	Liverpool Olympia, Liverpool, England	Prizefighter: The Lightweights II – Quarter-final
13	Win	13–0	Sid Razak	PTS	4	1 Jun 2012	KC Stadium, Hull, England	
12	Win	12–0	Maurycy Gojko	TKO	2 (6)	18 May 2012	Bowlers Exhibition Centre, Manchester, England	
11	Win	11–0	Graeme Higginson	KO	3 (10), 2:00	23 Mar 2012	City Hall, Hull, England	Won vacant Central Area lightweight title
10	Win	10–0	Arek Malek	PTS	10	7 Oct 2011	City Hall, Hull, England	
9	Win	9–0	Mark McCullough	PTS	10	24 Apr 2011	City Hall, Hull, England	
8	Win	8–0	Andrew Patterson	PTS	4	22 Jan 2011	The Dome Leisure Centre, Doncaster, England	
7	Win	7–0	Matt Seawright	PTS	4	19 Dec 2010	De Vere Whites Hotel, Bolton, England	
6	Win	6–0	Ibrar Riyaz	PTS	4	17 Sep 2010	The Dome Leisure Centre, Doncaster, England	
5	Win	5–0	Daniel Thorpe	TKO	1 (4), 2:16	2 Jul 2010	The Dome Leisure Centre, Doncaster, England	
4	Win	4–0	Karl Taylor	PTS	6	2 May 2010	Sports Arena, Hull, England	
3	Win	3–0	Daniel Thorpe	PTS	6	20 Feb 2010	Sports Arena, Hull, England	
2	Win	2–0	Damien Turner	RTD	4 (6), 3:00	4 Dec 2009	The Dome Leisure Centre, Doncaster, England	
1	Win	1–0	Kristian Laight	PTS	6	18 Sep 2009	The Dome Leisure Centre, Doncaster, England	

== Tommy Coyle Foundation ==
The Tommy Coyle Foundation, a limited company, was incorporated in 2015. The Foundation is involved in community activities and in 2022 distributed around 2,000 school uniforms to families in Hull.

Sporting positions
Regional boxing titles
Vacant Title last held by Jon Baguley	Central Area lightweight champion 23 March 2012 – 21 June 2012; Vacated	Vacant Title next held by Kieran Farrell
Vacant Title last held by Samir Ziani	WBC International Silver lightweight champion 2 November 2012 – 8 November 2013; Vacated	Vacant Title next held by Miguel Roman
Vacant Title last held by Martin Gethin	IBF International lightweight champion 2 November 2013 – August 2015; Vacated	Vacant Title next held by Alessandro Riguccini
Vacant Title last held by Sean Dodd	Commonwealth lightweight champion 21 April 2018 – August 2018; Vacated	Vacant Title next held by Joe Cordina
Awards
Previous: Timothy Bradley vs. Ruslan Provodnikov; Round 6	The Ring Round of the Year vs. Daniel Brizuela; Round 11; 2014	Next: Amir Imam vs. Fidel Maldonado; Round 3
Previous: Timothy Bradley vs. Ruslan Provodnikov; Round 12	ESPN Round of the Year vs. Daniel Brizuela; Round 11; 2014	Next: Krzysztof Głowacki vs. Marco Huck; Round 6
