= Mikhail Biarnadski =

Belarusian boxer (born 1977)

Medal record

Men's Boxing

Representing Belarus

European Amateur Championships
Bronze medal – third place	2004 Pula	Featherweight

Mikhail Biarnadski (born 10 January 1977) is a boxer from Belarus.

He participated in the 2004 Summer Olympics. There he was stopped in the second round of the Featherweight (57 kg) division by Romania's Viorel Simion. His olympic results were:

- Defeated Likar Ramos Concha (Colombia) 32–18
- Lost to Viorel Simion (Romania) 13–38

Biarnadski won a bronze medal in the same division six months earlier, at the 2004 European Amateur Boxing Championships in Pula, Croatia.
