= Likar Ramos Concha =

Colombian boxer (born 1985)

Likar Ramos
Personal information
- Born: Likar Arturo Ramos Concha; September 8, 1985 (age 40) Barranquilla, Colombia
- Height: 5 ft 7 in (170 cm)
- Weight: Super featherweight

Boxing career
- Stance: Southpaw

Boxing record
- Total fights: 48
- Wins: 30
- Win by KO: 23
- Losses: 18
Medal record
Men's Amateur boxing
Representing Colombia
Pan American Games
Gold medal – first place	2003 Santo Domingo	Featherweight
Central American and Caribbean Games
Bronze medal – third place	2002 San Salvador	Featherweight

Likar Arturo Ramos Concha (born September 8, 1985, in Barranquilla, Atlántico) is a boxer from Colombia, who participated in the 2004 Summer Olympics for his native South American country.

== Amateur ==
He started boxing at age nine, according to his profile on the official website of the 2004 Summer Olympics. Ramos Concha made his debut for Colombia at the 2002 Central American and Caribbean Games in San Salvador, El Salvador, winning a silver medal.

In 2003 he won the gold medal at the Pan American Games.

In Athens he was stopped in the round of sixteen of the Featherweight (57 kg) division by Belarus' Mikhail Biarnadski.

== Pro ==
He started his professional career unspectacularly, losing two of his first twelve bouts. However, after November 2006, he won eleven straight bouts.

On November 19, 2009, he defeated Angel Granados via twelve-rounds unanimous decision in Medellín, Colombia for the vacant WBA Interim Super Featherweight Championship.

On July 16, 2011, he lost to Juan Manuel Márquez at the Plaza de Toros in Cancun, Quintana Roo, Mexico. “Dinamita” Marquez landed a hard right hand on Likar's chin who fell ending the bout at 1:47 in the first round. Many boxing fans believe that the blow landed on Ramos was not hard enough to result in a knockout & felt that Ramos took a dive.

== Professional boxing record ==
48 fights	30 wins	18 losses
By knockout	23	16
By decision	7	1
By disqualification	0	1

No.	Result	Record	Opponent	Type	Round, time	Date	Location	Notes
48	Loss	30–18	Emill Gonzalez Lopez	TKO	3 (8)	2024-08-30	Coliseo de Pescaito David Ruiz Ureche, Santa Marta, Colombia	
47	Loss	30–17	Keithland King	KO	2 (6)	2024-02-10	Coliseo de Pescaito David Ruiz Ureche, Santa Marta, Colombia	
46	Loss	30–16	Vincenzo Carita	TKO	6 (10)	2023-09-22	Coliseo de Pescaito David Ruiz Ureche, Santa Marta, Colombia	
45	Loss	30–15	Carlos Galvan	KO	3 (10)	2023-02-04	Coliseo Menor de Villa Olímpica, Santa Marta, Colombia	For vacant Colombian light-heavyweight title
44	Loss	30–14	Quincy LaVallais	RTD	4 (8)	2022-08-28	Coliseo de Pescaito David Ruiz Ureche, Santa Marta, Colombia	
43	Loss	30–13	Dervin Colina	TKO	5 (10)	2022-05-13	Club La Amistad, Santa Marta, Colombia	
42	Loss	30–12	Bryan Perez Castillo	TKO	2 (10)	2021-10-08	Coliseo Carlos 'Teo' Cruz, Santo Domingo, Dominican Republic	
41	Loss	30–11	Johan Gonzalez	KO	2 (10)	2021-07-23	Palacio Dorado, Panama City, Panama	
40	Loss	30–10	Stepan Diyun	TKO	1 (10)	2021-02-20	Crocus City Hall, Krasnogorsk, Russia	
39	Win	30–9	Jhon Merino	KO	1 (6)	2019-12-07	Club Anibal Gonzalez, Cartagena, Colombia	
38	Loss	29–9	Jose Miguel Borrego	TKO	3 (8)	2019-10-26	Santander Arena, Reading, Pennsylvania, U.S.	
37	Loss	29–8	Ilhami Aydemir	TKO	2 (10)	2018-07-01	Intersaal, Cologne, Germany	
36	Loss	29–7	Sergei Shigashev	RTD	2 (8)	2018-03-10	Maritim Berghotel, Braunlage, Germany	
35	Win	29–6	Jhon Merino	KO	1 (6)	2018-02-03	Gimnasio Jorge Garcia Beltran, Barranquilla, Colombia	
34	Win	28–6	Elkin Zabaleta	KO	2 (6)	2017-09-01	Centro Recreacional Las Vegas, Barranquilla, Colombia	
33	Win	27–6	Jhon Merino	KO	3 (6)	2017-07-14	Barrio Las Flores, Barranquilla, Colombia	
32	Loss	26–6	Jean Carlos Prada	KO	2 (12)	2015-01-16	Domo José María Vargas, La Guaira, Venezuela	
31	Win	26–5	Elkin Lopez	TKO	2 (4)	2014-08-29	Gimnasio Jorge Garcia Beltran, Barranquilla, Colombia	
30	Win	25–5	Johnny De Horta	UD	6	2013-07-19	Parque de la Independencia, Malambo, Colombia	
29	Loss	24–5	Claudio Alfredo Olmedo	KO	1 (12)	2012-05-19	Salón de los Bomberos Voluntarios, General Villegas, Argentina	
28	Loss	24–4	Juan Manuel Márquez	TKO	1 (10)	2011-07-16	Plaza de Toros, Cancún, Mexico	
27	Win	24–3	Julio Cesar Perez	TKO	1 (8)	2011-04-30	Coliseo Cubierto, Puerto Colombia, Colombia	
26	Win	23–3	Julio Gomez	KO	4 (10)	2010-10-01	Coliseo Municipal, Puerto Colombia, Colombia	
25	Win	22–3	Franklin Arroyo	KO	5 (8)	2010-08-13	Polideportivo del Barrio Hipodromo, Soledad, Colombia	
24	Loss	21–3	Jorge Solís	KO	7 (12)	2010-02-06	Complejo Deportivo La Inalámbrica, Mérida, Mexico	Lost Interim WBA super-featherweight title
23	Win	21–2	Angel Granados	UD	12	2009-11-19	La Macarena, Medellín, Colombia	Won Interim WBA super-featherweight title
22	Win	20–2	Ernesto Morales	TKO	3 (12)	2009-06-20	Universidad del Norte, Barranquilla, Colombia	
21	Win	19–2	Orlen Padilla	KO	8 (12)	2009-02-14	Puerto Colombia, Colombia	
20	Win	18–2	Daniel Mercado	KO	2 (?)	2008-11-13	Estadio Metropolitano, Barranquilla, Colombia	
19	Win	17–2	Luis Perez	KO	2 (8)	2008-08-16	Coliseo Menor de Villa Olímpica, Santa Marta, Colombia	
18	Win	16–2	Edinson Jimenez	TKO	4 (8)	2007-12-20	Centro Recreacional Las Vegas, Barranquilla, Colombia	
17	Win	15–2	Samir Torres	UD	8	2007-09-01	Salón Jumbo Country Club, Barranquilla, Colombia	
16	Win	14–2	Armando Velasquez	KO	1 (6)	2007-07-19	Coliseo Elías Chegwin, Barranquilla, Colombia	
15	Win	13–2	Dunis Linan	UD	8	2007-05-11	Romelio Martínez Stadium, Barranquilla, Colombia	
14	Win	12–2	Luis Cardozo	KO	5 (6)	2007-01-27	Centro de Cultura Física, Barranquilla, Colombia	
13	Win	11–2	Daniel Mercado	KO	1 (6)	2006-11-17	Coliseo Municipal, Puerto Colombia, Colombia	
12	Loss	10–2	Edixon Garcia	DQ	5 (10)	2006-09-16	Romelio Martínez Stadium, Barranquilla, Colombia	
11	Win	10–1	Miguel Pacheco	KO	1 (?)	2006-08-11	Coliseo Municipal, Valledupar, Colombia	
10	Win	9–1	Edixon Garcia	UD	8	2006-06-30	Coliseo Elías Chegwin, Barranquilla, Colombia	
9	Loss	8–1	Walter Estrada	UD	10	2006-05-12	Centro Recreacional Las Vegas, Barranquilla, Colombia	
8	Win	8–0	Manuel Ulloa	KO	1 (?)	2006-03-31	Barranquilla, Colombia	
7	Win	7–0	Victor Julio Salgado	KO	3 (8)	2006-02-23	Barranquilla, Colombia	
6	Win	6–0	Dairo Julio	PTS	6	2005-12-16	Coliseo Municipal, Puerto Colombia, Colombia	
5	Win	5–0	Jose Portillo	PTS	6	2005-11-19	Puerto Colombia, Colombia	
4	Win	4–0	Orlando Perez	KO	1 (?)	2005-09-30	Polideportivo San Felipe, Barranquilla, Colombia	
3	Win	3–0	Julian Flores	KO	2 (6)	2005-08-06	Coliseo Elías Chegwin, Barranquilla, Colombia	
2	Win	2–0	Enrique Rivera	KO	3 (4)	2005-07-15	Centro Recreacional Las Vegas, Barranquilla, Colombia	
1	Win	1–0	Antonio Zappa	KO	2 (4)	2005-07-01	Coliseo Elías Chegwin, Barranquilla, Colombia	

== See also ==
- List of male boxers
- List of southpaw stance boxers

Sporting positions
World boxing titles
Vacant Title last held by Joel Casamayor	WBA super-featherweight champion Interim title November 19, 2009 – February 6, 2010	Succeeded by Jorge Solís
