= Zorigtbaataryn Enkhzorig =

Mongolian boxer (1987–2018)

Medal record

Men's Boxing

Representing Mongolia

Asian Games
Silver medal – second place	2006 Doha	Featherweight

Asian Championships
Gold medal – first place	2007 Ulan Bator	Featherweight
Bronze medal – third place	2009 Zhuhai	Lightweight

Zorigtbaataryn Enkhzorig (Mongolian: Зоригтбаатарын Энхзориг; February 27, 1987 – November 4, 2018) was an amateur boxer from Mongolia who competed at the 2006 Asian Games in the Featherweight (-57 kg) division, beat Kazakastan's Galib Jafarov and ended up with the silver medal after losing against Uzbekistan's Bahodirjon Sultonov 15–37.

At the Olympics 2008 he beat Morocco's Mahdi Ouatine 10:1 but was edged out 9:10 by Cuban Idel Torriente. At the World Championships in 2009 he lost to José Pedraza.
