= Rustamhodza Rahimov =

German boxer

Medal record

Men's Boxing

Representing Germany

Olympic Games
Bronze medal – third place	2004 Athens	Flyweight

World Championships
Silver medal – second place	2005 Mianyang	Bantamweight
Bronze medal – third place	2003 Bangkok	Flyweight

European Championships
Bronze medal – third place	2004 Pula	Flyweight

Rustamhodza "Rustam" Rahimov (born February 16, 1975, in Dushanbe) is a German former boxer of Tajikistanii origin. He won a bronze medal in the flyweight semi-finals at the 2004 Summer Olympics, where he was defeated by Cuba's Yuriorkis Gamboa Toledano.

== Medals ==
- At the 2004 Summer Olympics, Rahimov won the bronze medal in the flyweight boxing event. He was 29.
- At the 2005 World Boxing Championships, he beat American Gary Russell Jr. at bantamweight and won the silver medal.

== Olympic results ==
- 1st round bye
- Defeated Óscar Escandón (Colombia) 25-15
- Defeated Paulus Ambunda (Namibia) 28-15
- Lost to Yuriorkis Gamboa Toledano (Cuba) 11-20
