= Konstantine Kupatadze =

Georgian boxer (born 1983)

Medal record

Representing Georgia

Men's Boxing

European Amateur Championships
Bronze medal – third place	2002 Perm	Featherweight
Bronze medal – third place	2004 Pula	Featherweight

Konstantine Kupatadze (Georgian: კონსტანტინე კუპატაძე) (born 28 April 1983) is a boxer from Georgia.

He participated in the 2004 Summer Olympics. There he went the distance and lost a decision in the featherweight (57 kg) division against North Korea's eventual runner-up Kim Song-Guk.

Kupatadze won bronze medals in the same division at the 2002 European Amateur Boxing Championships and the 2004 European Amateur Boxing Championships.
