= Edvaldo Gonzaga =

Brazilian boxer (born 1982)

Personal information
- Nickname: Badola
- Born: Edvaldo Gonzaga de Oliveira; 25 June 1982 (age 44) Salvador, Bahia, Brazil
- Height: 1.71 m (5 ft 7 in)

Boxing career

Boxing record
- Total fights: 7
- Wins: 7
- Win by KO: 4
- Losses: 0

Edvaldo Gonzaga de Oliveira (born 25 June 1982) is a Brazilian former professional boxer who competed from 2005 to 2007. As an amateur, he competed in the men's featherweight event at the 2004 Summer Olympics.
