= Sergey Gulyakevich =

Belarusian boxer

Personal information
- Nationality: (Belarus) Belarusian
- Born: Sergey Gulyakevich; 1 June 1981 (age 45) Minsk
- Weight: Super featherweight

Boxing career
- Stance: Orthodox

Boxing record
- Total fights: 66
- Wins: 45
- Win by KO: 18
- Losses: 19
- Draws: 2

Sergey Gulyakevich (born 1 June 1981) is a Belarusian professional boxer who competes in the super featherweight division. He is a former European champion for the weight division and world title challenger.

== Professional career ==
Gulyakevich made his professional debut in Minsk on 25 April 2003. He compiled a record of 15-0 fighting mainly in countries such as Belarus, Estonia and Russia before travelling to Monaco to defeat Tontcho Tontchev for the WBA Inter-continental title on 20 July 2005. Two fights and two more victories followed the win over Tontchev to set Gulyakevich up for a shot at the full European title held by Scotsman Alex Arthur.

=== European champion and World title challenger ===
The fight with Arthur in April 2006 saw Gulyakevich travel to Edinburgh, Scotland only to suffer his first defeat as a professional when the fight was stopped in the 7th round due to a cut on his left eye. Following the defeat Gulyakevich returned to Belarus and scored a further five wins in his home country. On 22 December 2007 he travelled to Italy in order to challenge the new European champion Levan Kirakosyan. This time the result was a more positive one and he won the fight via a unanimous decision. He has since made one defence travelling to Germany in December 2008 to defeat German fighter Vitali Tajbert over 12 rounds. Gulyakevich relinquished the title in July 2009 when the opportunity arose to fight for the WBC Interim World featherweight title. This followed the confirmation of current champion Humberto Soto's intention to move up in weight after his next defence. The decision meant that Gulyakevich and Mexican boxer Humberto Mauro Gutiérrez would meet for the interim belt in Mexico on 22 August 2009. The fight itself saw the Mexican win the belt via a majority decision when after 12 rounds of boxing one of the judges scored a draw with two others handing victory to Gutierrez.

=== Comeback ===
Following the defeat to Gutierrez, Gulyakevich returned to Minsk and marked time by scoring a victory in his home town. On 19 February 2010, he then returned to the United Kingdom to fight on the undercard of a Ricky Hatton promotion in Stoke. He defeated Georgian fighter Nikoloz Berkatsashvili in the 2nd round of their fight which was one of the supporting bouts to the European title bout between Scott Lawton and former victim Levan Kirakosyan. On 16 April 2010, he returned to the UK once again to meet Nugzar Margvelashvili, another Georgian at the Robin Park Centre in Wigan winning on points over six rounds. Two more fights in 2010 resulted in two further victories against George Mchedlishvili and Araik Sachbazjan with both fights taking place in Minsk. Gulyakevich had seven comeback fights in Riga, Latvia in 2012 winning all seven, beating Georgian Lightweight Champion Kakhaber Avetisian and also winning a Baltic League Lightweight title against fellow Belarusian Andrei Hramyka, who he stopped in the 3rd of a scheduled 8 rounder in November 2012. He has had one winning fight in Riga in 2013. Gulyakevich is a much avoided fighter who has seen negotiated fights with IBO World Super Featherweight Champion Will Tomlinson, former IBF Featherweight Champion Billy Dib and Top Rank prospect Terrence Crawford all dashed for various reasons. He has had one fight in 2014 a shutout points win over 6x3 min rounds against Bulgarian Kristian Dochev and is currently scheduled to fight DiBella Entertainment's top Lightweight prospect Ivan Redkach as the main event live on ESPN Television in St Charles, Missouri on Saturday 27 June 2014, after Redkach's original opponent former WBC World Super Featherweight champion Vitaly Tajbert, whom Gulyakevich has previously beaten in a European Super Featherweight title fight withdrew through injury. Gulyakevich narrowly missed out on winning the WBC interim World Super Featherweight Title against Humberto Gutierrez in Mexico in 2009 and it is his intention to fight for and win a World Title soon after first as to be expected he gets past Redkach first.
