= 2nd AIBA Asian 2004 Olympic Qualifying Tournament =

The 2nd AIBA Asian 2004 Olympic Boxing Qualifying Tournament was held in Karachi, Pakistan from May 6 to May 12, 2004. Also known as the Green Hill Tournament it was the penultimate opportunity for Asian amateur boxers to qualify for the 2004 Summer Olympics after the 2004 Asian Amateur Boxing Championships. The top two of each division earned Olympic qualification with the exception of the heavyweight and super heavyweight divisions, in which there were no qualification opportunities.

== Medal winners ==
Event	Gold	Silver	Bronze
Light Flyweight (– 48 kilograms)	Hong Moo-Won (KOR)	Harry Tanamor (PHI)	Toshiyuki Igarashi (JPN) Otabek Namayonov (UZB)
Flyweight (– 51 kilograms)	Mirzhan Rakhimzhanov (KAZ)	Bonyx Yusak Saweho (INA)	Badar Uugan (MGL) Kaoru Murahashi (JPN)
Bantamweight (– 54 kilograms)	Worapoj Petchkoom (THA)	Diwakar Prasad (IND)	Berik Serikbayev (KAZ) Ibrahim Al-Gharahir (JOR)
Featherweight (– 57 kilograms)	Ahmed Sohail (PAK)	Asylbek Talasbayev (KGZ)	Iszankuli Meretnyazov (TKM) Terukado Shoyama (JPN)
Lightweight (– 60 kilograms)	Chen Tongzhou (CHN)	Uranchimegiin Mönkh-Erdene (MGL)	Adnan Yusoh (MAS) Piichai Sayota (THA)
Light Welterweight (– 64 kilograms)	Faisal Karim (PAK)	Vijender Singh (IND)	Morteza Sepahvand (IRI) Yang Hyun-Tae (KOR)
Welterweight (– 69 kilograms)	Bakhtiyar Artayev (KAZ)	Salman Karimi (IRI)	Christopher Feros (PHI) Non Boonjumnong (THA)
Middleweight (– 75 kilograms)	Ahmed Ali Khan (PAK)	Suriya Prasathinphimai (THA)	Koji Satou (JPN) Cho Deok-Jin (KOR)
Light Heavyweight (– 81 kilograms)	Utkirbek Haydarov (UZB)	Shokhrat Kurbanov (TKM)	Mavlodod Alidadov (TJK) Taher Jabbari (IRI)

== Qualified ==
=== Light Flyweight (– 48 kg) ===
- Hong Moo-Won (KOR)
- Harry Tanamor (PHI)

=== Flyweight (– 51 kg) ===
- Mirzhan Rakhimzhanov (KAZ)
- Bonyx Yusak Saweho (INA)

=== Bantamweight (– 54 kg) ===
- Worapoj Petchkoom (THA)
- Diwakar Prasad (IND)

=== Featherweight (– 57 kg) ===
- Ahmed Sohail (PAK)
- Asylbek Talasbayev (KGZ)

=== Lightweight (– 60 kg) ===
- Chen Tongzhou (CHN)
- Uranchimegiin Mönkh-Erdene (MGL)

=== Light Welterweight (– 64 kg) ===
- Faisal Karim (PAK)
- Vijender Singh (IND)

=== Welterweight (– 69 kg) ===
- Bakhtiyar Artayev (KAZ)
- Salman Karimi (IRI)

=== Middleweight (– 75 kg) ===
- Ahmed Ali Khan (PAK)
- Suriya Prasathinphimai (THA)

=== Light Heavyweight (– 81 kg) ===
- Utkirbek Haydarov (UZB)
- Shokhrat Kurbanov (TKM)

== See also ==
- 2004 Asian Amateur Boxing Championships
- 1st AIBA Asian 2004 Olympic Qualifying Tournament
