= Daouda Sow (boxer) =

French boxer

Personal information
- Born: 19 January 1983 (age 43) Roubaix, France

Boxing career
- Stance: Southpaw

Boxing record
- Wins: 39
- Win by KO: 7
- Losses: 11
Medal record
Men's boxing
Representing France
Olympic Games
Silver medal – second place	2008 Beijing	Lightweight

Daouda Sow (born 19 January 1983 in Roubaix) is an amateur boxer from France. He competed at the 2008 Summer Olympics in the lightweight division. Sow signed with the AIBA professional league, called AIBA Pro Boxing (APB), which launched in autumn of 2013.

== Boxing career ==
At the first Olympic qualifier the southpaw lost to Ukrainian Oleksandr Klyuchko but qualified at the second tournament. At Beijing he surprisingly medaled by beating Olympic silver medalist Kim Song-Guk, José Pedraza, local Hu Qing and 2005 world champ Yordenis Ugás and made it to the final. There he was edged out by Russian 2004 Olympic Champion Aleksei Tishchenko 9:11.

=== Olympic Games results ===
2008 (as a lightweight)

- Defeated Kim Song-Guk (North Korea) 13-3
- Defeated José Pedraza (Puerto Rico) 13-9
- Defeated Hu Qing (China) 9-6
- Defeated Yordenis Ugás (Cuba) 15-8
- Lost to Aleksei Tishchenko

=== World amateur championships results ===
2007 (as a lightweight)

- Lost to Romal Amanov (Azerbaijan) 6-19
