= Humberto Mauro Gutiérrez =

Mexican boxer

Humberto Mauro Gutierrez
Personal information
- Nickname: Cachorrito
- Born: Humberto Mauro Gutierrez; 8 November 1988 (age 37) Los Mochis, Sinaloa, Mexico
- Height: 1.75 m (5 ft 9 in)
- Weight: Lightweight; Super featherweight Featherweight

Boxing career
- Reach: 175 cm (69 in)
- Stance: Southpaw

Boxing record
- Total fights: 40
- Wins: 31
- Win by KO: 22
- Losses: 7
- Draws: 2
- No contests: 0

Humberto Mauro Gutiérrez (born 8 November 1988) is a Mexican professional boxer.

== Professional career ==
On 22 August 2009, Gutiérrez won the interim WBC super featherweight title against Belarusian Sergey Gulyakevich.

He fought and lost the title to Vitali Tajbert in Germany in 2009. Germany's Tajbert, who previously lost his bid for the European super featherweight title to Sergey Gulyakevich, wins the WBC interim title in a major upset over Gutierrez.

On 8 April 2011, Gutiérrez challenged Takahiro Ao for the WBC super featherweight title, but was knocked out in the fourth round.

Achievements
Vacant Title last held by Humberto Soto	WBC super featherweight champion Interim Title; August 22, 2009 - November 21, 2009	Succeeded by Vitali Tajbert
