= 2004 European Amateur Boxing Championships =

Boxing competitions

- Host city: Pula
- Country: Croatia
- Nations: 41
- Athletes: 292
- Dates: 19–29 February

The men's 2004 European Amateur Boxing Championships were held in Pula, Croatia, from February 19 to February 29. The 35th edition of the bi-annual competition was organised by the European governing body for amateur boxing, EABA. A total number of 292 fighters from 41 countries competed at these championships. Russia's Gaydarbek Gaydarbekov afterwards received the Best Fighter Award. The tournament served as a qualification event for the 2004 Summer Olympics in Athens, Greece. All medal winners earned a berth for the Athens Games.

== Medal winners ==
Event	Gold	Silver	Bronze
Light flyweight (−48 kilograms)	Sergey Kazakov; Russia	Alfonso Pinto; Italy	Pál Bedák; Hungary Salim Salimov; Bulgaria
Flyweight (−51 kilograms)	Georgi Balakshin; Russia	(Georgia (country)) Nikoloz Izoria; Georgia	Rustamhodza Rahimov; Germany Andrzej Rzany; Poland
Bantamweight (−54 kilograms)	Gennady Kovalev; Russia	Ali Hallab; France	Detelin Dalakliev; Bulgaria Andrzej Liczik; Poland
Featherweight (−57 kilograms)	Vitali Tajbert; Germany	Khedafi Djelkhir; France	Mikhail Bernadski; Belarus (Georgia (country)) Konstantine Kupatadze; Georgia
Lightweight (−60 kilograms)	Dimitar Stilianov; Bulgaria	Selcuk Aydin; Turkey	Gyula Káté; Hungary Domenico Valentino; Italy
Light welterweight (−64 kilograms)	Alexander Maletin; Russia	Ihor Pashchuk; Ukraine	Mustafa Karagöllü; Turkey Willy Blain; France
Welterweight (−69 kilograms)	Oleg Saitov; Russia	Xavier Noel; France	Ruslan Khairov; Azerbaijan Rolandas Jasevicius; Lithuania
Middleweight (−75 kilograms)	Gaydarbek Gaydarbekov; Russia	Lukas Wilaschek; Germany	Javid Taghiyev; Azerbaijan (Republic of Ireland) Andy Lee; Ireland
Light heavyweight (−81 kilograms)	Evgeny Makarenko; Russia	Marijo Šivolija; Croatia	Alexey Kuziemski; Poland Andriy Fedchuk; Ukraine
Heavyweight (−91 kilograms)	Aleksandr Alekseyev; Russia	Viktor Zuyev; Belarus	Vedran Đipalo; Croatia Ertugrul Ergezen; Turkey
Super heavyweight (+91 kilograms)	Alexander Povetkin; Russia	Roberto Cammarelle; Italy	Jaroslav Jaksto; Lithuania Sergey Rozhnov; Bulgaria

== Medal table ==
Rank	Nation	Gold	Silver	Bronze	Total
1	Russia (RUS)	9	0	0	9
2	Germany (GER)	1	1	1	3
3	Bulgaria (BUL)	1	0	3	4
4	France (FRA)	0	3	1	4
5	Italy (ITA)	0	2	1	3
6	Turkey (TUR)	0	1	2	3
7	Belarus (BLR)	0	1	1	2
7	Croatia (CRO)	0	1	1	2
7	Georgia (GEO)	0	1	1	2
7	Ukraine (UKR)	0	1	1	2
11	Poland (POL)	0	0	3	3
12	Azerbaijan (AZE)	0	0	2	2
12	Hungary (HUN)	0	0	2	2
12	Lithuania (LTU)	0	0	2	2
15	Ireland (IRL)	0	0	1	1
Totals (15 entries)		11	11	22	44

== See also ==
- 1st AIBA European 2004 Olympic Qualifying Tournament
- 2nd AIBA European 2004 Olympic Qualifying Tournament
- 3rd AIBA European 2004 Olympic Qualifying Tournament
- 4th AIBA European 2004 Olympic Qualifying Tournament
