= Ryan Langham =

Australian boxer

Personal information
- Nickname: Iron Ryan
- Nationality: Australia
- Born: Ryan Langham; 15 November 1981 (age 44) Blacktown, New South Wales, Australia
- Height: 1.82 m (5 ft 11 1/2 in)
- Weight: Featherweight

Boxing career
- Stance: Southpaw

Boxing record
- Total fights: 18
- Wins: 15
- Win by KO: 8
- Losses: 3
- Draws: 0
- No contests: 0

Ryan Langham (born 15 November 1981 in Blacktown, New South Wales) is a professional Australian boxer in the featherweight division. He was selected to compete for the Australian boxing team at the 2004 Summer Olympics, before turning pro by the following year. From then on, Langham held a remarkable record of twenty-five bouts throughout his professional stint, including fifteen victories and five knock outs.

Langham qualified for the men's featherweight division (57 kg) at the 2004 Summer Olympics in Athens. Earlier in the process, he was guaranteed a spot on the Australian boxing team after finishing first at the AIBA Oceania Qualification Tournament in Tonga. Langham lost his opening match to Romania's Viorel Simion with an effortless 40–15 score.
