= Magomed Aripgadjiev =

Belarusian boxer (born 1977)

Magomed Aripgadzhiyev
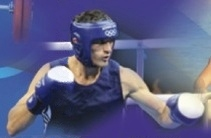
- Aripgadjiev on a 2004 Belarusian stamp

Personal information
- Full name: Magomed Davudovich Aripgadzhiyev
- Nickname: Mahamed Ali
- Nationality: Belarus
- Born: 23 September 1977 (age 49) Kaspiysk, Dagestan ASSR, Soviet Union
- Height: 1.85 m (6 ft 1 in)
- Weight: 81 kg (179 lb)

Sport
- Sport: Boxing
- Weight class: Light Heavyweight
Medal record
Olympic Games
Silver medal – second place	2004 Athens	Light Heavyweight
World Amateur Championships
Silver medal – second place	2003 Bangkok	Light Heavyweight

Magomed Davudovich Aripgadzhiyev (Russian: Магомед Давудович Арипгаджиев; born 23 September 1977) is a Belarusian boxer who won a silver medal in the light heavyweight division (– 81 kg) at the 2004 Summer Olympics. He qualified for the 2004 Summer Olympics by finishing second at the 4th AIBA European 2004 Olympic Qualifying Tournament in Baku, Azerbaijan. He previously represented Azerbaijan in the 2000 Olympics.

== Professional career ==
Aripgadzhiyev turned pro in 2005, and by 2010 won 16 bouts (10 by knockout) and lost two.
