= 4th AIBA European 2004 Olympic Qualifying Tournament =

The 4th AIBA European 2004 Olympic Qualifying Tournament was held in Baku, Azerbaijan from April 27 to May 1, 2004 during the annual Chowdry Boxing Cup. Boxers finishing in the top two in each weight category earned a chance to compete at the 2004 Summer Olympics. Only the winner of the super heavyweight division (+ 91 kg) was guaranteed a place.

== Medal winners ==
Event	Gold	Silver	Bronze
Light Flyweight (– 48 kilograms)	Jeyhun Abiyev (AZE)	Atagün Yalçınkaya (TUR)	Veaceslav Gojan (MDA) Darren Langley (GBR)
Bantamweight (– 54 kilograms)	Aghasi Mammadov (AZE)	Khavazhi Khatsigov (BLR)	Serdar Avcı (TUR) Bashir Hassan (SWE)
Lightweight (– 60 kilograms)	Murat Khrachev (RUS)	Volodymyr Kravets (UKR)	Mariusz Koperski (POL) Anatoliy Nawiczok (BLR)
Welterweight (– 69 kilograms)	Bülent Ulusoy (TUR)	Vitalie Gruşac (MDA)	Neil Perkins (GBR) Dorel Simion (ROU)
Light Heavyweight (– 81 kilograms)	Ali Ismailov (AZE)	Magomed Aripgadzhiyev (BLR)	Constantin Bejenaru (ROU) Babacar Kamara (SWE)
Super Heavyweight (+ 91 kilograms)	Aleksey Masikin (UKR)	Mariusz Wach (POL)	Ilgar Mammadov (AZE) Adams Dauberkovs (LAT)

== Qualified ==
=== Light Flyweight (– 48 kg) ===
- Jeyhun Abiyev (AZE)
- Atagün Yalçınkaya (TUR)

=== Bantamweight (– 54 kg) ===
- Aghasi Mammadov (AZE)
- Khavazhi Khatsigov (BLR)

=== Lightweight (– 60 kg) ===
- Murat Khrachev (RUS)
- Volodymyr Kravets (UKR)

=== Welterweight (– 69 kg) ===
- Bülent Ulusoy (TUR)
- Vitalie Gruşac (MDA)

=== Light Heavyweight (– 81 kg) ===
- Ali Ismailov (AZE)
- Magomed Aripgadzhiyev (BLR)

=== Super Heavyweight (+ 91 kg) ===
- Aleksey Masikin (UKR)

== See also ==
- 2004 European Amateur Boxing Championships
- 1st AIBA European 2004 Olympic Qualifying Tournament
- 2nd AIBA European 2004 Olympic Qualifying Tournament
- 3rd AIBA European 2004 Olympic Qualifying Tournament
