= 3rd AIBA European 2004 Olympic Qualifying Tournament =

The 3rd AIBA European 2004 Olympic Qualifying Tournament was held in Gothenburg, Sweden from April 20 to April 25, 2004. The top two in each weight category gained qualification into the 2004 Summer Olympics.

== Medal winners ==
Event	Gold	Silver	Bronze
Flyweight (– 51 kilograms)	Igor Samoilenco (MDA)	Fuad Aslanov (AZE)	Vincenzo Picardi (ITA) Bogdan Dobrescu (ROU)
Featherweight (– 57 kilograms)	Viorel Simion (ROU)	Sedat Taşcı (TUR)	Krzysztof Szot (POL) Henrik Kertesz (HUN)
Light Welterweight (– 64 kilograms)	Ionuţ Gheorghe (ROU)	Boris Georgiev (BUL)	Tofik Ahmedov (AZE) Sergey Bykovsky (BLR)
Middleweight (– 75 kilograms)	Károly Balzsay (HUN)	Serdar Üstüner (TUR)	Dmitry Usagin (BUL) Aleksander Rubiuk (EST)
Heavyweight (– 91 kilograms)	Kubrat Pulev (BUL)	Andreas Gustafsson (SWE)	Vyacheslav Glazkov (UKR) Alan Reynolds (IRL)

== Qualified ==
=== Flyweight (– 51 kg) ===
- Igor Samoilenco (MDA)
- Fuad Aslanov (AZE)

=== Featherweight (– 57 kg) ===
- Viorel Simion (ROU)
- Sedat Taşcı (TUR)

=== Light Welterweight (– 64 kg) ===
- Ionuţ Gheorghe (ROU)
- Boris Georgiev (BUL)

=== Middleweight (– 75 kg) ===
- Károly Balzsay (HUN)
- Serdar Üstüner (TUR)

== See also ==
- 2004 European Amateur Boxing Championships
- 1st AIBA European 2004 Olympic Qualifying Tournament
- 2nd AIBA European 2004 Olympic Qualifying Tournament
- 4th AIBA European 2004 Olympic Qualifying Tournament
