= Oleksandr Klyuchko =

Ukrainian boxer (born 1984)

Personal information
- Full name: Олександр Ключко
- Nationality: Ukraine
- Born: July 11, 1984 (age 41) Mykolaiv, Mykolaiv Oblast, Ukrainian SSR, Soviet Union
- Height: 1.70 m (5 ft 7 in)
- Weight: 60 kg (130 lb)

Sport
- Sport: Boxing
- Weight class: Lightweight
- Club: Dynamo Mykolaiv
Medal record
European Amateur Championships
Bronze medal – third place	2006 Plovdiv	Lightweight
Bronze medal – third place	2010 Moscow	Light Welterweight
European Olympic Qualifying
Gold medal – first place	2008 Roseto degli Abruzzi–Pescara	Lightweight

Oleksandr Klyuchko (Ukrainian: Олександр Ключко) (born July 11, 1984, in Mykolaiv) is an amateur boxer from Ukraine who won a bronze medal in the lightweight division at the 2006 European Amateur Boxing Championships. He has qualified for the 2008 Olympics.

== Career ==
At the European Championships he won against Domenico Valentino 30:18 and future world champion Frankie Gavin 42:26, but lost to Olympic champion Alexey Tishchenko 29:42 and took bronze.

At the World Championships 2007 he defeated Asian champion Hu Qing 26:13 but lost against by Colombian Darley Perez 10:13.

He qualified for the 2008 Olympics by defeating Daouda Sow and Azerbaijani boxer Ramal Amanov in the semifinal of a European qualifying tournament. In his Olympic debut he lost to Hu Qing of China, 8:10.

At the 2010 European Amateur Boxing Championships at Moscow, Russia he won the bronze medal. In the semifinals he lost to Hrachik Javakhyan from Armenia.
