= Georgian Popescu =

Romanian boxer

Personal information
- Nationality: Romanian
- Born: Georgian Popescu

Boxing career

Georgian Popescu (born October 20, 1984) is an amateur boxer from Romania. He qualified to complete at the 2008 Summer Olympics in the lightweight division.
