= Aghasi Mammadov =

Azerbaijani boxer (born 1980)

Personal information
- Full name: Aghasi Aghagul oghlu Mammadov
- Nationality: Azerbaijani
- Born: 1 June 1980 (age 46) Baku, Azerbaijan
- Height: 1.69 m (5 ft 7 in)
- Weight: 54 kg (119 lb)

Sport
- Sport: Boxing
- Weight class: Bantamweight
Medal record
Representing Azerbaijan
Olympic Games
Bronze medal – third place	2004 Athens	Bantamweight
World Amateur Championships
Gold medal – first place	Bangkok 2003	Bantamweight
Representing Turkey
World Amateur Championships
Silver medal – second place	Belfast 2001	Bantamweight
European Amateur Championships
Gold medal – first place	2000 Tampere	Bantamweight
Mediterranean Games
Gold medal – first place	2001 Tunis	Bantamweight

Aghasi Aghagul oghlu Mammadov (born 1 June 1980) is an Azerbaijani boxer who competed in the bantamweight division (54 kg) at the 2004 Summer Olympics and won the bronze medal.

== Career ==
Mammadov competed for Turkey for several years, under the name Aghasi Aghaguloghlu, for instance at the 2000 Summer Olympics in Sydney.

=== Olympic results 2000 (as a bantamweight) ===
- Defeated Mai Kangde (China) 17–4
- Defeated Nehomar Cermeño (Venezuela) 11–3
- Lost to Guillermo Rigondeaux (Cuba) 5–14

He returned to Azerbaijan before the 2002 European Championships, and now competes for Azerbaijan. A year later, at the 2003 World Amateur Boxing Championships in Bangkok, he won the world title in the Bantamweight Division in the finals against Russia's Gennady Kovalev. In the second round he sensationally beat Cuban superstar Guillermo Rigondeaux 16:13 after losing to him in Sydney and Belfast. He qualified for the 2004 Summer Olympics by topping the 4th AIBA European 2004 Olympic Qualifying Tournament in Baku, Azerbaijan.

=== Olympic results 2004 (as a bantamweight) ===
- Defeated Joel Brunker (Australia) RSC 3 (0:59)
- Defeated Detelin Dalakliev (Bulgaria) 35–16
- Defeated Maksym Tretyak (Ukraine) 32–12
- Lost to Worapoj Petchkoom (Thailand) 19-27
