= Daniel Brizuela (boxer) =

Argentine boxer

Personal information
- Nickname: Tatú ("Tattoo")
- Born: Daniel Eduardo Brizuela; December 29, 1985 (age 40) Las Heras, Mendoza, Argentina
- Height: 1.70 m (5 ft 7 in)
- Weight: Featherweight

Boxing career
- Stance: Orthodox

Boxing record
- Total fights: 39
- Wins: 28
- Win by KO: 8
- Losses: 8
- Draws: 2
- No contests: 1

Daniel Eduardo Brizuela (born 29 December 1985) is an Argentine professional boxer. As an amateur he competed for Argentina at the 2004 Summer Olympics in Athens, where he was stopped in the first round of the men's featherweight event by Germany's Vitali Tajbert.

He earned Olympic qualification as a semi-finalist at the 2nd AIBA American 2004 Olympic Qualifying Tournament. American Aaron Garcia won the original qualification berth, but was dropped after he failed to qualify at the US Olympic trials.

His fight with British Champion Tommy Coyle is cited as one of the greatest fights inside a British ring, with 7 knockdowns and a dramatic final round finish.

== Professional boxing record ==
28 Wins (8 knockouts), 8 Losses, 2 Draws
Res.	Record	Opponent	Type	Rd.,Time	Date	Location	Notes
Loss	28–8–2	(Argentina) Pablo Manuel Ojeda	KO	8 (10)	2017-06-30	Club Sportivo Barracas, Buenos Aires, Distrito Federal, Argentina	For ABF Argentine Featherweight title.
Loss	28–7–2	(Argentina) Matias Rueda	TKO	1 (10)	2016-11-05	(Argentina) Club Union y Progreso, Tandil, Buenos Aires Province	For ABF Argentine Featherweight title.
Loss	28–6–2	(United Kingdom) Stephen Smith	TKO	7 (12)	2016-05-29	(United Kingdom) Goodison Park, Liverpool, Merseyside, England	For WBC Silver Super Featherweight title.
Loss	28–5–2	(Argentina) Mauricio Javier Munoz	MD	12 (12)	2015-06-26	Club Ciclista Juninense, Junín, Buenos Aires, Argentina	
Win	28–4–2	(Argentina) Marcos Gabriel Martinez	MD	12 (12)	2015-03-27	Estadio Aldo Cantoni, San Juan, San Juan, Argentina	
Win	27–4–2	(Argentina) Roberto Joaquin Iturra	UD	10 (10)	2014-12-20	Casino Enjoy, Mendoza, Mendoza, Argentina	
Loss	26-4-2	(United Kingdom) Luke Campbell	TKO	5 (10)	2014-10-25	Hull Arena, Hull, Yorkshire, United Kingdom	
Win	26–3–2	(Argentina) Jorge Samuel Fredes	UD	10 (10)	2014-07-26	Estadio Polideportivo Juan Domingo Ribosqui, Maipú, Mendoza, Argentina	
Loss	25–3–2	(United Kingdom) Tommy Coyle	TKO	12 (12)	2014-02-22	Hull Arena, Hull, Yorkshire, United Kingdom	IBF International lightweight title
Loss	25–2–2	(Indonesia) Daud Yordan	UD	12 (12)	2013-07-06	Metro City, Northbridge, Western Australia, Australia	vacant IBO lightweight title
Win	25–1–2	(Argentina) Diego Alberto Chaves	UD	10 (10)	2013-03-08	Estadio Polideportivo Juan Domingo Ribosqui, Maipú, Mendoza, Argentina	
Win	24–1–2	(Argentina) Mario Julio Ruben Martinez	SD	6 (6)	2012-06-22	Bragado Club y Biblioteca Pública, Bragado, Buenos Aires, Argentina	
Win	23–1–2	(Argentina) Miguel Leonardo Caceres	SD	8 (8)	2011-11-25	Estadio Pascual Perez, Mendoza, Mendoza, Argentina	
Win	22–1–2	(Argentina) Julio Cesar Ruiz	SD	12 (12)	2011-08-13	Polideportivo Vicente Polimeni, Las Heras, Mendoza, Argentina	Won vacant IBF Latino lightweight title
Draw	21–1–2	(Argentina) Gustavo David Bermudez	SD	6 (6)	2011-02-19	Salón Municipal, Villa del Dique, Cordoba, Argentina	
Win	21–1–1	(Argentina) Adrian Marcelo Flamenco	UD	6 (6)	2010-11-27	Auditorio Angel Bustelo, Mendoza, Mendoza, Argentina	
Win	20–1–1	(Argentina) Ricardo Fabricio Chamorro	UD	6 (6)	2010-10-16	Casino de Mendoza, Mendoza, Mendoza, Argentina	
Win	19–1–1	(Argentina) Cristian David Serrano	TKO	3 (6)	2010-09-18	Estadio Ruca Che, Neuquen, Neuquen, Argentina	
Win	18–1–1	(Argentina) Jorge Andres Ferreira	TKO	5 (6)	2010-03-20	Casino de Mendoza, Mendoza, Mendoza, Argentina	
Loss	17–1–1	(Argentina) Daniel Alberto Dorrego	KO	1 (12)	2009-11-21	Club Deportivo Libertad, Sunchales, Santa Fe, Argentina	Loss WBO Latino lightweight title
Win	17–0–1	(Argentina) Marcelo Omar Lazarte	UD	10 (10)	2009-10-11	Estadio F.A.B., Buenos Aires, Distrito Federal, Argentina	
Win	16–0–1	(Argentina) Miguel Dario Lombardo	UD	12 (12)	2009-03-28	Estadio Polideportivo Juan Domingo Ribosqui, Maipú, Mendoza, Argentina	
Win	15–0–1	(Argentina) Diego Alejandro Madole	UD	10 (10)	2009-02-21	Auditorio Angel Bustelo, Mendoza, Mendoza, Argentina	
Win	14–0–1	(Argentina) Eduardo Daniel Roman	SD	12 (12)	2008-11-22	Club Juventus, Corrientes, Corrientes, Argentina	Won WBO Latino lightweight title
Draw	13-0-1	(Argentina) Diego Alejandro Madole	SD	6 (6)	2008-07-11	Club Deportivo Libertad, Sunchales, Santa Fe, Argentina	
Win	13-0	(Argentina) Sergio Eduardo Gonzalez	SD	10 (10)	2008-06-03	Polideportivo La Colonia, Junin, Mendoza, Argentina	
