= Asylbek Talasbayev =

Kyrgyzstani boxer

Personal information
- Full name: Асылбек Таласбаев
- Nationality: Kyrgyzstan
- Born: February 7, 1982 (age 44)
- Height: 1.77 m (5 ft 10 in)
- Weight: 60 kg (130 lb)

Sport
- Sport: Boxing
- Weight class: Lightweight

Asylbek Talasbayev (born February 7, 1982) is an amateur boxer from Kyrgyzstan. He qualified to compete at the 2008 Summer Olympics in the lightweight division where he upset Everton Lopes (9:7) but lost to Colombia's Darley Pérez.

Talasbayev also competed at the 2004 Summer Olympics. He qualified for the 2004 Athens Games as a featherweight (– 57 kg) by ending up in second place in the 2nd AIBA Asian 2004 Olympic Qualifying Tournament in Karachi, Pakistan. In the final he lost to Pakistan's Ahmed Sohail.
