= Dmitry Usagin =

Bulgarian boxer

Personal information
- Born: January 31, 1978 (age 48)
Medal record
Men's Boxing
Representing Bulgaria
European Amateur Championships
Bronze medal – third place	2000 Tampere	Light Middleweight

Dmitry Usagin (Bulgarian: Дмитрий Усагин; born January 31, 1978) is a boxer from Bulgaria, who competed for his native country at the 2000 Summer Olympics in Sydney, Australia.

Usagin is best known for winning the bronze medal at 2000 European Amateur Boxing Championships in the Men's Light-Middleweight (– 71 kg) division, alongside Yugoslavia's Nikola Sjekloća. He failed to qualify for the 2004 Summer Olympics, finishing in third place at the 3rd AIBA European 2004 Olympic Qualifying Tournament in Gothenburg, Sweden.
