= Igor Samoilenco =

Moldovan boxer

Personal information
- Full name: Igor Samoilenco
- Nationality: Moldova
- Born: April 17, 1977 (age 49) Tiraspol, Moldavian SSR, Soviet Union
- Height: 1.63 m (5 ft 4 in)
- Weight: 51 kg (112 lb)

Sport
- Sport: Boxing
- Weight class: Flyweight
Medal record
European Amateur Championships
Bronze medal – third place	2002 Perm	Flyweight

Igor Samoilenco (born April 17, 1977, in Tiraspol, Moldavian SSR) is a retired male boxer from Moldova. He twice represented his native Eastern European country at the Summer Olympics: 1996 and 2004. Samoilenco claimed a bronze medal at the 2002 European Amateur Boxing Championships in Perm, Russia. He qualified for the 2004 Summer Olympics in Athens, Greece by ending up in first place at the 3rd AIBA European 2004 Olympic Qualifying Tournament in Gothenburg, Sweden.

== General references ==
- Igor Samoilenco at Olympics at Sports-Reference.com (archived)
- Igor Samoilenco at Olympedia
