= Pichai Sayotha =

Thai boxer

Personal information
- Full name: พิชัย สายโยธา
- Nationality: Thailand
- Born: December 24, 1979 (age 46) Sa Nok Kaeo, Phon Thong, Roi Et
- Height: 1.72 m (5 ft 8 in)
- Weight: 60 kg (132 lb)

Sport
- Sport: Boxing
- Weight class: Lightweight
Medal record
World Championships
| Silver medal – second place | 2003 Bangkok | Lightweight |
Asian Championships
| Gold medal – first place | 2005 Ho Chi Minh City | Lightweight |
| Bronze medal – third place | 2004 Puerto Princesa | Lightweight |

Pichai Sayotha (Thai: พิชัย สายโยธา; RTGS: Phichai Sai-yotha; born December 24, 1979) is a Thai amateur boxer best known for winning a silver medal in the lightweight category at the 2003 World Championships.

== Career ==
Sayotha made his national debut in 2002.

In 2003 he had his biggest success at the World Championships in his home country only losing to Mario Kindelán.

In 2004 Summer Olympics he did not compete because he lost in the qualify of the national team representative to the senior boxer Somluck Kamsing in the lightweight category at The Mall Bangkhae.

He did not participate in 2005 and reached the quarterfinal in 2007 where he lost to Russian favorite Aleksei Tishchenko but qualified for Beijing (2008).

In 2005 he also competed for Thailand at the Boxing World Cup in Moscow, Russia, with one loss and one win in the preliminary round. In 2008 he beat Tishchenko at the Kings Cup. At the 2008 Summer Olympics he lost his only bout 4:10 to South Korean Baik Jong-Sub. After defeat, he retired.
