= Diwakar Prasad =

Indian boxer

Personal information
- Full name: Diwakar Prasad
- Nickname: DK
- Nationality: Indian
- Born: Jamshedpur Jharkhand
- Height: 1.62 m (5 ft 4 in)
- Weight: 54 kg (119 lb)

Sport
- Sport: Boxing
- Weight class: Bantamweight
- Club: Steel Plant Sports Board

Diwakar Prasad is an Indian former amateur boxer.

He qualified to compete in the bantamweight division (54 kg) at the 2004 Summer Olympics in Athens, Greece after losing in the finals of the 2nd AIBA Asian 2004 Olympic Qualifying Tournament in Karachi, Pakistan to Thailand's Worapoj Petchkoom. In the 2004 Olympics he lost in the second round to Nigeria's Nestor Bolum and came joint 9th.

Other notable achievements include:

- 2003 Asian Olympic Qualifier - Bronze
- 2003 Commonwealth Boxing Championship - Bronze
- 2004 SAFF Games - Bronze
- 2006 Grand Prix Boxing - Silver
- 2009 56th Senior National Boxing Championship at Hyderabad - Bronze
- 2010 Sahara 57th Senior National Boxing C'ship at Talkatora Indoor Stadium - Bronze
- 2011 65th All India Inter Railway Men Boxing C'ship at Karnail Stadium - Gold
- 2012 Sahara 58th Senior Men National Boxing C'ship at Alagappa Engineering - Gold
