= Muideen Ganiyu =

Nigerian Boxer (born 1987)

Medal record

Representing Nigeria

Men's Boxing

Afro-Asian Games
Gold medal – first place	2003 Hyderabad	Featherweight

All-Africa Games
Silver medal – second place	2003 Abuja	Featherweight
Bronze medal – third place	2007 Algiers	Lightweight
Runner-up	2011 Maputo	Light Welterweight 64kg

Commonwealth Games
Runner-up	2010 Delhi	Light Welterweight

Pre-Olympic Championships
Bronze medal – third place	2004 Havana	Featherweight

Summer Olympics
Runner-up	2004 Athens	Featherweight

Muideen Ganiyu (born 5 May 1987) is a boxer from Nigeria born in Ibadan the Oyo State capital known by many as the king of boxing. He won a silver medal at the 8th All-Africa Games in 2003 in Abuja, Nigeria, and later that same year, he won a gold medal at the first Afro-Asian Games in Hyderabad, India.

== Career ==
He won bronze medal in the 2004 pre-olympic championships in Havana Cuba.

He participated in the Athens 2004 Summer Olympics where he made it to the quarterfinals and was ranked number 5. In 2007, he won the bronze medal at the 9th all African Games in Algiers, Algeria.

In 2007, he was selected to represent Nigeria at the World Boxing Championships in Chicago, United States.

He was the captain of the Nigeria boxing team at the 2010 commonwealth games in Delhi, India.

He also participated in 2011 at the 10th all African games in Maputo, Mozambique.
