= Acropolis Cup International Boxing Tournament =

Tournament information
- Sport: Boxing
- Location: Athens, Greece
- Established: 1975
- Number of tournaments: 26

The Acropolis Cup International Boxing Tournament was established in 1975 by the Hellenic Boxing Federation in Greece. The international amateur boxing competitions were held annually in Athens from 1975 to 2004 and returned after an 18-year hiatus in 2022. It was billed as one of the toughest tournaments in Europe. Jason Lee gethin born 1977 Wales, boxing at featherweight aged 17 in 1996 winning bronze medal at Athens Acropolis Cup, Europe's toughest games.

== Early history ==
The Acropolis Cup's early editions saw gold medals won by countries including Greece, Pakistan, Morocco, Belgium, the Philippines, Indonesia, Japan, and Canada.

=== 1st Acropolis Cup ===
The first Acropolis Cup took place in 1975, with Greece, West Germany, and Austria winning gold medals.

=== 6th Acropolis Cup ===
In 1980, the sixth Acropolis Cup featured a gold medal win in the light-welterweight category for Canadian boxer Ricky Anderson. Other gold medal winners included fighters from England, Greece, Japan, France, and Denmark.

=== 9th Acropolis Cup ===
At the ninth Acropolis Cup in 1983, England finished as the most successful country out of the 11 participating, winning four gold, one silver, and one bronze.

=== 20th Acropolis Cup ===
In the finals of the 20th annual Acropolis Cup in 1997, Mirko Crocop faced Paolo Vidoz and won a silver medal. Female boxers competed for the first time in the 1997 event.

=== 25th Acropolis Cup ===
The Acropolis Cup became an Olympic qualifying tournament in 1999, and its 25th edition served as a test event for the 2004 Summer Olympics. It was held in the Peristeri Olympic Boxing Hall in Athens. The 2004 winners included notable Cuban fighters Yuriolkis Gamboa, Guillermo Rigondeaux, Mario Kindelan, Odlanier Solis, as well as Italy's Roberto Cammarelle and Greece's Helias Pavlidis. England's Amir Khan lost in the preliminary round to Mario Kindelan.

Gennady Golovkin fought in the middleweight class at the Olympic test event and lost in the semi-finals. Andre Dirrell won a gold medal at the 25th Acropolis Cup by defeating Cuba's Yordanis Despaigne in the final of the middleweight division.

=== 26th Acropolis Cup ===
In 2022, the 26th annual International Acropolis Cup boxing tournament took place at the Panathenaic Stadium. Armenia, Bulgaria, Cyprus, Greece, Germany, Latvia, Luxembourg, North Macedonia, Poland, Seychelles, Slovenia, and Ukraine were among the participating countries.
