= 2003 World Amateur Boxing Championships =

Boxing competitions

2003 AIBA World Boxing Championships
- Venue: Nimibutr Stadium
- Location: Bangkok, Thailand
- Start date: July 6, 2003
- End date: July 13, 2003

The men's 2003 World Amateur Boxing Championships were held in Bangkok, Thailand, from July 6 to July 13. The competition was organised by the world governing body for amateur boxing AIBA.

== Medal winners ==
Event	Gold	Silver	Bronze
Light flyweight (–48 kilograms)	Sergey Kazakov; Russia	Zou Shiming; People's Republic of China	Nauman Karim; Pakistan Harry Tañamor; Philippines
Flyweight (–51 kilograms)	Somjit Jongjohor; Thailand	Jérôme Thomas; France	Alexandar Alexandrov; Bulgaria Rustamhodza Rahimov; Germany
Bantamweight (–54 kilograms)	Aghasi Mammadov; Azerbaijan	Gennadiy Kovalev; Russia	Detelin Dalakliev; Bulgaria Bahodirjon Sultonov; Uzbekistan
Featherweight (–57 kilograms)	Galib Jafarov; Kazakhstan	Vitali Tajbert; Germany	Abdusalom Khasanov; Tajikistan Cho Seok-Hwan; South Korea
Lightweight (–60 kilograms)	Mario Kindelán; Cuba	Pichai Sayotha; Thailand	Martin Dreßen; Germany Gyula Káté; Hungary
Light welterweight (–64 kilograms)	Willy Blain; France	Alexandr Maletin; Russia	Manus Boonjumnong; Thailand Tofik Ahmadov; Azerbaijan
Welterweight (–69 kilograms)	Lorenzo Aragón; Cuba	Sherzod Husanov; Uzbekistan	Andre Berto; United States Ruslan Khairov; Azerbaijan
Middleweight (–75 kilograms)	Gennady Golovkin; Kazakhstan	Oleh Mashkin; Ukraine	Yordanis Despaigne; Cuba Nikola Sjekloća; Serbia and Montenegro
Light heavyweight (–81 kilograms)	Yevgeniy Makarenko; Russia	Magomed Aripgadjiev; Belarus	Rudolf Kraj; Czech Republic Aleksy Kuziemski; Poland
Heavyweight (–91 kilograms)	Odlanier Solis; Cuba	Aleksandr Alekseyev; Russia	Steffen Kretschmann; Germany Viktor Zuyev; Belarus
Super heavyweight (+91 kilograms)	Alexander Povetkin; Russia	Pedro Carrión; Cuba	Sebastian Köber; Germany Rustam Saidov; Uzbekistan

== Medal table ==
Rank	Nation	Gold	Silver	Bronze	Total
1	Russia (RUS)	3	3	0	6
2	Cuba (CUB)	3	1	1	5
3	Kazakhstan (KAZ)	2	0	0	2
4	Thailand (THA)	1	1	1	3
5	France (FRA)	1	1	0	2
6	Azerbaijan (AZE)	1	0	2	3
7	Germany (GER)	0	1	4	5
8	Uzbekistan (UZB)	0	1	2	3
9	Belarus (BLR)	0	1	1	2
10	China (CHN)	0	1	0	1
10	Ukraine (UKR)	0	1	0	1
12	Bulgaria (BUL)	0	0	2	2
13	Czech Republic (CZE)	0	0	1	1
13	Hungary (HUN)	0	0	1	1
13	Pakistan (PAK)	0	0	1	1
13	Philippines (PHI)	0	0	1	1
13	Poland (POL)	0	0	1	1
13	Serbia and Montenegro (SCG)	0	0	1	1
13	South Korea (KOR)	0	0	1	1
13	Tajikistan (TJK)	0	0	1	1
13	United States (USA)	0	0	1	1
Totals (21 entries)		11	11	22	44
