= Kim Song-guk (boxer) =

North Korean boxer (born 1984)

Personal information
- Nationality: North Korea
- Born: April 11, 1984 (age 42) North Korea
- Height: 1.77 m (5 ft 10 in)

Sport
- Sport: Boxing
- Weight class: Featherweight
Medal record
Olympic Games
Silver medal – second place	2004 Athens	Featherweight
World Championships
Bronze medal – third place	2007 Chicago	Lightweight
Asian Games
Bronze medal – third place	2006 Doha	Featherweight
Asian Championships
Gold medal – first place	2007 Ulan Bator	Lightweight
Silver medal – second place	2005 Ho Chi Minh City	Featherweight

- Kim Song-guk
- Hangul: 김성국
- RR: Gim Seongguk
- MR: Kim Sŏngguk

Kim Song-guk (Korean: 김성국; born April 11, 1984) is a North Korean boxer who competed in the featherweight (– 57 kg) category at the 2004 Summer Olympics and won the silver medal.

== Career ==
Southpaw Kim upset Germany's Vitali Tajbert at the Olympics 2004 but lost to Russian star Alexei Tichtchenko. He qualified for the Athens Games by topping the 1st AIBA Asian 2004 Olympic Qualifying Tournament in Guangzhou, China. In the final he defeated Thailand's Somluck Kamsing.

At the Asian Games he lost to Uzbekistan's Bahodirjon Sooltonov in the semis and won bronze.

== Amateur highlights ==
2004 Olympic Games

- 1st round bye
- Defeated Konstantine Kupatadze (Georgia) 25–14
- Defeated Muideen Ganiyu (Nigeria) 32–11
- Defeated Vitali Tajbert (Germany) 29–24
- Lost to Alexei Tichtchenko (Russia) 17–39

2007 AIBA World Amateur Championships

- Defeated Otoneil Ortiz (Virgin Islands) RSC 2 (0:57)
- Defeated Alejandro Rodríguez (Spain) RSC 3 (1:49)
- Defeated Vazgen Safar-Yants (Belarus) 19–18
- Defeated Darley Perez (Colombia) 23–6
- Lost to Domenico Valentino (Italy) 14–22

2008 Olympic Games

- Lost to Daouda Sow (France) 3-13
