= Shahin Imranov =

Azerbaijani boxer (born 1980)

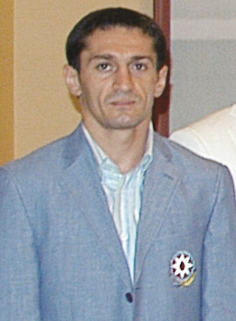

Personal information
- Full name: Shahin Salim oglu Imranov
- Nationality: Azerbaijani
- Born: September 23, 1980 (age 45) Sumgait, AzSSR, USSR
- Height: 1.70 m (5 ft 7 in)
- Weight: 57 kg (126 lb)

Sport
- Sport: Boxing
- Weight class: Featherweight
Medal record
Olympic Games
Bronze medal – third place	2008 Beijing	Featherweight
European Amateur Championships
Silver medal – second place	2002 Perm	Featherweight
Silver medal – second place	2006 Plovdiv	Featherweight

Shahin Imranov (Azerbaijani: Şahin İmranov) (born 23 September 1980) is a boxer from Azerbaijan. He is best known for winning two featherweight silver medals at European championships.

== Career ==
Imranov won a silver medal at the 2002 European Amateur Boxing Championships. He qualified for the 2004 Summer Olympics by ending up in second place at the 2nd AIBA European 2004 Olympic Qualifying Tournament in Warsaw, Poland. In the 2004 Olympics boxing tournament he was defeated in the second round of the featherweight (57 kg) division by the eventual gold medal winner, Russian Alexei Tichtchenko.

He repeated his 2002 championship success at the 2006 European Amateur Boxing Championships. At the world championships of 2007 he was upset by Indian Anthresh Lalit Lakra. At the 2008 Olympics, he retired with an elbow injury in his semifinal bout against France's Khedafi Djelkhir and won bronze, he was trailing 2–5.
