= Aleksei Tishchenko =

Russian boxer

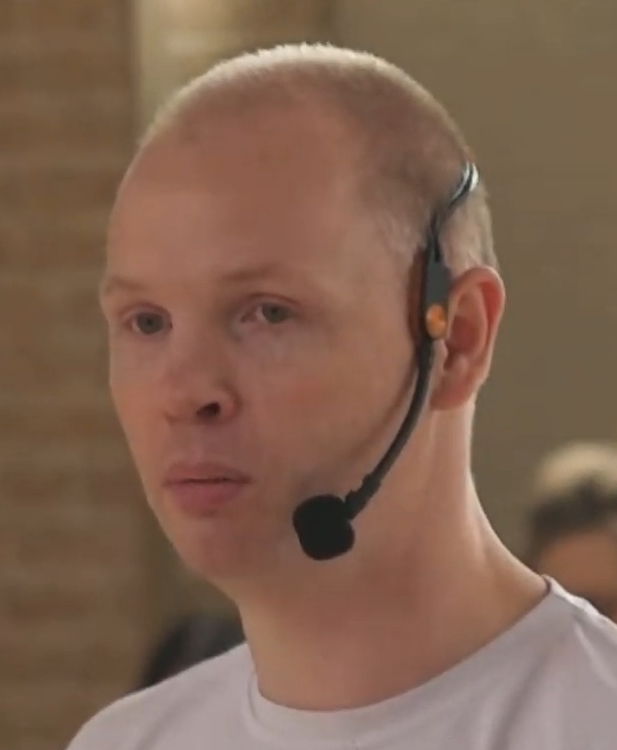

Medal record

Men's Boxing

Representing Russia

Olympic Games
Gold medal – first place	2004 Athens	Featherweight
Gold medal – first place	2008 Beijing	Lightweight

World Amateur Championships
Gold medal – first place	2005 Mianyang	Featherweight
Bronze medal – third place	2007 Chicago	Lightweight

European Amateur Championships
Gold medal – first place	2006 Plovdiv	Lightweight

World Cup
Gold medal – first place	2005 Moscow	Featherweight

Aleksei Viktorovich Tishchenko (Russian: Алексей Викторович Тищенко; born 29 May 1984) is a former Russian Olympic boxer best known for dominating the lower weight classes and winning numerous titles. He was regarded as "one of the best pound for pound Olympic boxers in the world".

He was born in Omsk, Soviet Union.

== Career ==
Tishchenko won the Featherweight Gold medal at the 2004 Summer Olympics. He had qualified for the 2004 Athens Games by topping the 2nd AIBA European 2004 Olympic Qualifying Tournament in Warsaw, Poland.

Tishchenko also won the featherweight gold medal at the 2005 World Amateur Boxing Championships in Mianyang, China.

In 2005 he was part of the Russian team that won the 2005 Boxing World Cup.

In 2006, he went up to lightweight and won the European title in Plovdiv the same year.

As of 2007 he has been elected into the Omsk Regional Duma for United Russia. At the same year at the world championships he was upset by Englishman Frankie Gavin.

At the 2008 Beijing Olympics, he benefitted from Gavin's absence and won the gold medal by defeating French boxer Daouda Sow in the final.

On 11 February 2011 he announced about finishing his career.

== Amateur results ==
2004 Olympic Games in Athens, Greece

- Defeated Hadj Belkheir (Algeria) 37-17
- Defeated Shahin Imranov (Azerbaijan) RSC-3 (1:08)
- Defeated Galib Jafarov (Kazakhstan) 40-22
- Defeated Jo Seok-Hwan (South Korea) 45-25
- Defeated Kim Song-Guk (North Korea) 39-17

2006 European Amateur Championships in Plovdiv, Bulgaria

- Defeated Odiseas Saridis (Greece) RSC-2
- Defeated Samet Huseinov (Bulgaria) AB-2
- Defeated Oleksandr Klyuchko (Ukraine) 42:29
- Defeated Hrachik Javakhyan (Armenia) 39:15

2007 World Amateur Championships in Chicago, United States

- Defeated Kim Joung-Won (South Korea) 27-20
- Defeated Hüsnü Koçabas (Netherlands) RSC 3 (1:34)
- Defeated Pichai Sayotha (Thailand) RSC 3 (1:40)
- Lost to Frankie Gavin (England) 10-19

2008 Olympic Games in Beijing, China

- Defeated Saifeddine Nejmaoui (Tunisia) 10-2
- Defeated Anthony Little (Australia) 11-3
- Defeated Darley Pérez (Colombia) 13-5
- Defeated Hrachik Javakhyan (Armenia) 10-5
- Defeated Daouda Sow (France) 11-9

== Biography ==
In 2014-2017 Aleksei Tishchenko was a member of the Civic Chamber of the Russian Federation.

== Awards ==
- Order of Honour (August 2, 2009)
