= Peristeri Olympic Boxing Hall =

Sports arena in Peristeri, west Athens, Greece

Coordinates: 38°00′47″N 23°42′59″E

- Interactive map of Peristeri Olympic Boxing Hall
- Full name: Peristeri Olympic Boxing Hall
- Location: Peristeri, Athens, Greece
- Capacity: Indoor Arena: 8,400 (original capacity); 2,305 (current capacity); Football Pitch: 3,000

Construction
- Opened: 2004
- Cost: €14.7 million euros (2004 money)

The Peristeri Olympic Boxing Hall is an indoor arena that is located in Peristeri, west Athens. The hall was the site of the boxing events at the 2004 Summer Olympics in Athens, Greece. The venue originally seated 8,400, though it had a public capacity of only 5,600 for the 2004 Olympics.

== History ==
After the 2004 Summer Olympics, the indoor facility was partially converted into a 3,000 seat outdoor football pitch. This lowered the seating capacity of the indoor arena from 8,400 to 2,305. The indoor arena has since been mainly used for gymnastics competitions, and at times to host basketball games of the Greek club Peristeri.

Since the summer of 2007, the outdoor association football pitch has been used as a training center by the Greek club Atromitos.
