= Hu Qing =

Chinese boxer

Personal information
- Full name: 胡青
- Nationality: China
- Born: January 19, 1986 (age 40) Liuan, Anhui
- Height: 1.83 m (6 ft 0 in)
- Weight: 60 kg (132 lb)

Sport
- Sport: Boxing
- Weight class: Lightweight
Medal record
Asian Games
Gold medal – first place	2006 Doha	Lightweight
Silver medal – second place	2010 Guangzhou	Lightweight

Hu Qing (born January 19, 1986) is a male amateur boxer from China. He competed at the 2006 Asian Games in the lightweight (- 60 kg) division winning the gold medal in the match against Mongolia's Uranchimegiin Mönkh-Erdene.

At the World Championships he lost his first match to Olexandr Klyuchko 13:26. He qualified for the 2008 Summer Olympics by beating Bekzod Khidirov. At the Olympics, he upset Ukrainian Oleksandr Klyuchko 10:8 and beat Kazakh Merey Akshalov 11:7 before losing to Frenchman Daouda Sow 6:9.
