= Sedat Taşcı =

Turkish boxer

Personal information
- Full name: Sedat Taşcı
- Nationality: Turkey
- Born: July 8, 1985 (age 40)
- Height: 1.73 m (5 ft 8 in)
- Weight: 57 kg (126 lb)

Sport
- Sport: Boxing
- Weight class: Featherweight
- Club: Fenerbahçe

Sedat Taşcı (born July 8, 1985) is a boxer from Turkey, who participated in the 2004 Summer Olympics for his country. There he was stopped in the first round of the Men's Featherweight (57 kg) division by South Korea's eventual third Jo Seok-hwan. He qualified for the Athens Games by ending up in second place at the 3rd AIBA European 2004 Olympic Qualifying Tournament in Gothenburg, Sweden. In the final he lost to Romania's Viorel Simion.
