= Fuad Aslanov =

Azerbaijani boxer (born 1983)

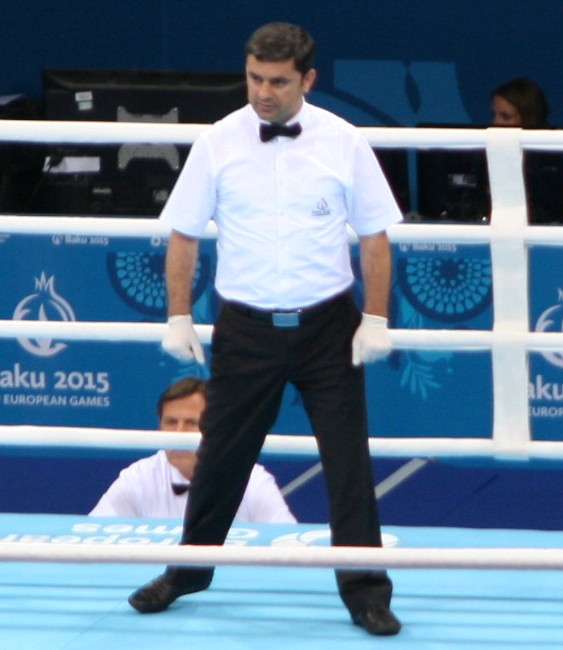
- Aslanov as a referee in 2015

Personal information
- Born: 2 January 1983 (age 43)
Medal record
Men's Boxing
Representing Azerbaijan
Olympic Games
Bronze medal – third place	2004 Athens	Flyweight

Fuad Aslanov (born January 2, 1983, in Sumgait) is an Azerbaijani boxer who competed in the flyweight division (– 51 kg) at the 2004 Summer Olympics and won the bronze medal. He qualified for the 2004 Summer Olympics in Athens, ending up in second place at the 3rd AIBA European 2004 Olympic Qualifying Tournament in Gothenburg.

== Olympic results ==
- Defeated George Jouvin Rakotoarimbelo (Madagascar) (walk-over)
- Defeated Nikoloz Izoria (Georgia) 27–21
- Defeated Andrzej Rżany (Poland) 24–23
- Lost to Jérôme Thomas (France) 18-23
