= Sohail Ahmed (boxer) =

Pakistani boxer (born 1979)

Personal information
- Full name: Baloch
- Nationality: German
- Born: 1 January 1979 (age 46)

Sport
- Sport: Boxing

Sohail Ahmed (born 1 January 1979) is a Pakistani boxer. He competed in the men's featherweight event at the 2004 Summer Olympics.
