= Jo Seok-hwan =

South Korean boxer (born 1979)

Jo Seok-Hwan
Personal information
- Full name: 조석환 (hangul) 趙石煥 (hanja)
- Nationality: South Korea
- Born: October 15, 1979 (age 46)
- Height: 1.70 m (5 ft 7 in)
- Weight: 54 kg (119 lb)

Sport
- Sport: Boxing
- Weight class: Featherweight
Medal record
Olympic Games
| Bronze medal – third place | 2004 Athens | Featherweight |
World Amateur Championships
| Bronze medal – third place | 2003 Bangkok | Featherweight |
Asian Championships
| Silver medal – second place | 2004 Puerto Princesa | Featherweight |

Jo Seok-Hwan (Korean: 조석환; born October 15, 1979) is a retired South Korean amateur boxer. He participated in the 2000 Summer Olympics for his native East Asian country. There he was stopped in the first round of the Bantamweight (54 kg) division by Uzbekistan' Alisher Rahimov. Later Jo won the bronze medal in the Featherweight (57 kg) division at the 2003 World Amateur Boxing Championships in Bangkok.

He participated in the 2004 Summer Olympics, and won the bronze medal. He qualified for the Athens Games by winning the silver medal at the 2004 Asian Amateur Boxing Championships in Puerto Princesa, Philippines. In the final he was defeated by Kazakhstan's Galib Jafarov.

In December 2008, Jo retired from boxing. He is currently serving as an assistant coach of the South Korea national boxing team.

== Results ==
2003 World Championships
| Event | Round | Result | Opponent | Score |
|---|---|---|---|---|
| Featherweight | First | Win | (England) David Mulholland | 31-16 |
| Featherweight | Second | Win | (Romania) Ovidiu Bobirnat | 25-14 |
| Featherweight | Quarterfinal | Win | (Russia) Aleksei Tishchenko | 40-18 |
| Featherweight | Semifinal | Loss | (Kazakhstan) Galib Jafarov | 32-17 |

2004 Summer Olympics
| Event | Round | Result | Opponent | Score |
|---|---|---|---|---|
| Featherweight | First | Win | (Turkey) Sedat Tasci | 37-28 |
| Featherweight | Second | Win | (Canada) Benoit Gaudet | 28-16 |
| Featherweight | Quarterfinal | Win | (Romania) Viorel Simion | 39-35 |
| Featherweight | Semifinal | Loss | (Russia) Aleksei Tishchenko | 25-45 |
