= Galib Jafarov =

Kazakhstani boxer

Personal information
- Full name: Galib Musa oglu Jafarov
- Nationality: Kazakhstan
- Born: May 9, 1978 (age 48) Aktobe, Kazakh SSR, Soviet Union
- Height: 1.70 m (5 ft 7 in)
- Weight: 57 kg (126 lb)

Sport
- Sport: Boxing
- Weight class: Featherweight
Medal record
World Amateur Championships
Gold medal – first place	2003 Bangkok	Featherweight
Silver medal – second place	2001 Belfast	Featherweight
Asian Games
Silver medal – second place	2002 Busan	Featherweight
Bronze medal – third place	2006 Doha	Featherweight
Asian Championships
Gold medal – first place	2004 Puerto Princesa	Featherweight

Galib Musa oglu Jafarov (Azerbaijani: Qalib Musa oğlu Cəfərov); is a Kazakh boxer of Azerbaijani descent, best known to win the gold medal at the 2003 World Amateur Boxing Championships in the Featherweight (– 57 kg) division.

== Career ==
In 2001 he lost the final to Turkish legend Ramaz Paliani but two years later he gained the gold medal at the World Championships. He competed at the 2004 Summer Olympics, but was defeated in the quarterfinals by Alexei Tichtchenko of Russia, who eventually won the competition. Jafarov qualified for the Athens Games by winning the gold medal at the 2004 Asian Amateur Boxing Championships in Puerto Princesa, Philippines. In the final he defeated South Korea's Jo Seok-Hwan.

At the 2006 Asian Games he lost to Zorigtbaataryn Enkhzorig and won bronze.
