= Baik Jong-sub =

South Korean boxer

Medal record

Men's Boxing

Representing South Korea

Asian Games
Silver medal – second place	2002 Busan	Lightweight

Asian Championships
Gold medal – first place	2004 Puerto Princesa	Lightweight

Baik Jong-sub (born July 5, 1980) is an amateur boxer in the Lightweight division from South Korea.

== Olympic results ==
Participated in the 2004 Olympic Games as a Lightweight boxer

- Defeated Gyula Kate (Hungary) 30-23
- Defeated Uranchimegiin Mönkh-Erdene (Mongolia) 33-22
- Lost to Amir Khan (Great Britain) RSC-1 (1:37)

Baik qualified for the Athens Games by winning the gold medal at the 2004 Asian Amateur Boxing Championships in Puerto Princesa, Philippines. In the final he defeated Pakistan's Asghar Ali Shah.

At the 2005 World Championships he beat three opponents including Selcuk Aydin but ran into eventual winner Yordenis Ugás in the quarterfinals and lost.
