= Boxing at the 2004 Summer Olympics =

Boxing at the Games of the XXVIII Olympiad
- Venue: Peristeri Olympic Boxing Hall
- Dates: 14 – 29 August 2004
- Competitors: 280 from 72 nations

Boxing at the 2004 Summer Olympics took place in the Peristeri Olympic Boxing Hall in Peristeri, west Athens. The event was only open to men and bouts were contested over four rounds of two minutes each. Five judges scored the fighters in real time and the boxer with the most points at the end was the winner.

Three days before the Games opening ceremony, the International Olympic Committee announced that Kenyan boxer David Munyasia had tested positive for cathine and had been excluded from the event.

Several medalists at the 2004 Olympics, including Amir Khan, Andre Ward, Gennady Golovkin, Yuriorkis Gamboa, and Guillermo Rigondeaux, later went on to become world champions in professional boxing. However, Cuban and Russian boxers do not typically turn pro as their government provides them with extensive funding which allows them to keep their “amateur” status and compete at multiple Olympics. The tournament was also Mario Kindelán's final Olympic event before retirement, with a second lightweight gold medal after defeating Amir Khan.

== Test event ==
The pre-Olympic test event, better known as the 25th Acropolis Cup, was held from 26 to 30 May 2004 in the Peristeri Olympic Boxing Hall in Athens, Greece.

== Qualification ==
The following tournaments were used as qualification tournaments for boxing at the 2004 Summer Olympics.

Africa

- All-Africa Games in Abuja, Nigeria from 4 to 20 October 2003
- Qualification Tournament in Casablanca, Morocco from 15 to 22 January 2004
- Qualification Tournament in Gaborone, Botswana from 15 to 22 March 2004

North and South America

- Pan American Games in Santo Domingo, Dominican Republic from 1 to 17 August 2003
- Qualification Tournament in Tijuana, Mexico from 12 to 20 March 2004
- Qualification Tournament in Rio de Janeiro, Brazil from 4 to 11 April 2004

Asia

- Asian Championships in Puerto Princesa, Philippines from 11 to 18 January 2004
- Qualification Tournament in Guangzhou, China from 18 to 26 March 2004
- Qualification Tournament in Karachi, Pakistan from 5 to 12 May 2004

Europe

- European Championships in Pula, Croatia from 19 to 29 February 2004
- Qualification Tournament in Plovdiv, Bulgaria from 29 March to 5 April 2004
- Qualification Tournament in Warsaw, Poland from 29 March to 5 April 2004
- Qualification Tournament in Gothenburg, Sweden from 20 to 25 April 2004
- Qualification Tournament in Baku, Azerbaijan from 27 April to 1 May 2004

Australia and Oceania

- Qualification Tournament in Tonga from 26 April to 2 May 2004

== Medal summary ==
Event	Gold	Silver	Bronze
Light flyweight	Yan Bartelemí; Cuba	Atagün Yalçınkaya; Turkey	Zou Shiming; China
Light flyweight	Yan Bartelemí; Cuba	Atagün Yalçınkaya; Turkey	Sergey Kazakov; Russia
Flyweight	Yuriorkis Gamboa; Cuba	Jérôme Thomas; France	Fuad Aslanov; Azerbaijan
Flyweight	Yuriorkis Gamboa; Cuba	Jérôme Thomas; France	Rustamhodza Rahimov; Germany
Bantamweight	Guillermo Rigondeaux; Cuba	Worapoj Petchkoom; Thailand	Aghasi Mammadov; Azerbaijan
Bantamweight	Guillermo Rigondeaux; Cuba	Worapoj Petchkoom; Thailand	Bahodirjon Sultonov; Uzbekistan
Featherweight	Aleksei Tishchenko; Russia	Kim Song-guk; North Korea	Vitali Tajbert; Germany
Featherweight	Aleksei Tishchenko; Russia	Kim Song-guk; North Korea	Jo Seok-hwan; South Korea
Lightweight	Mario Kindelán; Cuba	Amir Khan; Great Britain	Serik Yeleuov; Kazakhstan
Lightweight	Mario Kindelán; Cuba	Amir Khan; Great Britain	Murat Khrachev; Russia
Light welterweight	Manus Boonjumnong; Thailand	Yudel Johnson; Cuba	Boris Georgiev; Bulgaria
Light welterweight	Manus Boonjumnong; Thailand	Yudel Johnson; Cuba	Ionuţ Gheorghe; Romania
Welterweight	Bakhtiyar Artayev; Kazakhstan	Lorenzo Aragón; Cuba	Kim Jung-joo; South Korea
Welterweight	Bakhtiyar Artayev; Kazakhstan	Lorenzo Aragón; Cuba	Oleg Saitov; Russia
Middleweight	Gaydarbek Gaydarbekov; Russia	Gennady Golovkin; Kazakhstan	Suriya Prasathinphimai; Thailand
Middleweight	Gaydarbek Gaydarbekov; Russia	Gennady Golovkin; Kazakhstan	Andre Dirrell; United States
Light heavyweight	Andre Ward; United States	Magomed Aripgadjiev; Belarus	Ahmed Ismail; Egypt
Light heavyweight	Andre Ward; United States	Magomed Aripgadjiev; Belarus	Utkirbek Haydarov; Uzbekistan
Heavyweight	Odlanier Solís; Cuba	Viktar Zuyev; Belarus	Mohamed Elsayed; Egypt
Heavyweight	Odlanier Solís; Cuba	Viktar Zuyev; Belarus	Nasser Al Shami; Syria
Super heavyweight	Alexander Povetkin; Russia	Mohamed Aly; Egypt	Michel López Núñez; Cuba
Super heavyweight	Alexander Povetkin; Russia	Mohamed Aly; Egypt	Roberto Cammarelle; Italy

== Medal table ==
Rank	Nation	Gold	Silver	Bronze	Total
1	Cuba	5	2	1	8
2	Russia	3	0	3	6
3	Kazakhstan	1	1	1	3
3	Thailand	1	1	1	3
5	United States	1	0	1	2
6	Belarus	0	2	0	2
7	Egypt	0	1	2	3
8	France	0	1	0	1
8	Great Britain	0	1	0	1
8	North Korea	0	1	0	1
8	Turkey	0	1	0	1
12	Azerbaijan	0	0	2	2
12	Germany	0	0	2	2
12	South Korea	0	0	2	2
12	Uzbekistan	0	0	2	2
16	Bulgaria	0	0	1	1
16	China	0	0	1	1
16	Italy	0	0	1	1
16	Romania	0	0	1	1
16	Syria	0	0	1	1
Totals (20 entries)		11	11	22	44
