= Boxing at the 2004 Summer Olympics – Welterweight =

Welterweight boxing at the Games of the XXVIII Olympiad
- Venue: Peristeri Olympic Boxing Hall
- Date: 15–29 August 2004
- Competitors: 28 from 28 nations

Medalists
1st place, gold medalist(s)		Bakhtiyar Artayev	Kazakhstan
2nd place, silver medalist(s)		Lorenzo Aragón	Cuba
3rd place, bronze medalist(s)		Kim Jung-Joo	South Korea
3rd place, bronze medalist(s)		Oleg Saitov	Russia

The welterweight boxing competition at the 2004 Summer Olympics in Athens was held from 15 to 29 August at Peristeri Olympic Boxing Hall. This is limited to those boxers weighing between 64 and 69 kilograms.

== Competition format ==
Like all Olympic boxing events, the competition was a straight single-elimination tournament. This event consisted of 28 boxers who have qualified for the competition through various tournaments held in 2003 and 2004. The competition began with a preliminary round on 15 August, where the number of competitors was reduced to 16, and concluded with the final on 29 August. As there were fewer than 32 boxers in the competition, a number of boxers received a bye through the preliminary round. Both semi-final losers were awarded bronze medals.

All bouts consisted of four rounds of two minutes each, with one-minute breaks between rounds. Punches scored only if the white area on the front of the glove made full contact with the front of the head or torso of the opponent. Five judges scored each bout; three of the judges had to signal a scoring punch within one second for the punch to score. The winner of the bout was the boxer who scored the most valid punches by the end of the bout.

== Schedule ==
All times are Greece Standard Time (UTC+2)

Date	Time	Round
Sunday, 15 August 2004	13:30 & 19:30	Round of 32
Thursday, 19 August 2004	13:30 & 19:30	Round of 16
Sunday, 22 August 2004	19:30	Quarterfinals
Friday, 27 August 2004	19:30	Semifinals
Sunday, 29 August 2004	13:30	Final

== Qualifying Athletes ==
Athlete	Country
Juan Camilo Novoa	Colombia
Vilmos Balog	Hungary
Kim Jung-Joo	South Korea
Vitalie Gruşac	Moldova
Vanes Martirosyan	United States
Benamar Meskine	Algeria
Theodoros Kotakos	Greece
Lorenzo Aragón	Cuba
Ruslan Khairov	Azerbaijan
Adam Trupish	Canada
Sadat Tebazaalwa	Uganda
Hanati Silamu	China
Ellis Chibuye	Zambia
Bülent Ulusoy	Turkey
Jean Carlos Prada	Venezuela
Sherzod Husanov	Uzbekistan
Basharmal Sultani	Afghanistan
Mohamed Hikal	Egypt
Oleg Saitov	Russia
Ait Hammi Miloud	Morocco
Gerard O'Mahony	Australia
Viktor Polyakov	Ukraine
Xavier Noël	France
Andre Berto	Haiti
Bakhtiyar Artayev	Kazakhstan
Willy Bertrand Tankeu	Cameroon
Rolandas Jasevičius	Lithuania
Aliasker Bashirov	Turkmenistan

== Results ==
Round of 32
Vanes Martirosyan (USA)	45
Benamar Meskine (ALG)	20
Theodoros Kotakos (GRE)
Lorenzo Aragón (CUB)	RSC
Ruslan Khairov (AZE)	RSC
Adam Trupish (CAN)
Sadat Tebazaalwa (UGA)	17
Hanati Silamu (CHN)	29
Ellis Chibuye (ZAM)	32
Bülent Ulusoy (TUR)	45
Jean Carlos Prada (VEN)	20
Sherzod Husanov (UZB)	32
Basharmal Sultani (AFG)	12
Mohamed Hikal (EGY)	40
Oleg Saitov (RUS)	30
Ait Hammi Miloud (MAR)	15
Gerard O'Mahony (AUS)	27
Viktor Polyakov (UKR)	54
Xavier Noël (FRA)	36
Andre Berto (HAI)	34
Bakhtiyar Artayev (KAZ)	WO
Willy Bertrand Tankeu (CMR)
Rolandas Jasevičius (LTU)	21
Aliasker Bashirov (TKM)	54

Round of 16
Juan Camilo Novoa (COL)	33
Vilmos Balog (HUN)	24
Kim Jung-Joo (KOR)	23
Vitalie Gruşac (MDA)	20
Vanes Martirosyan (USA)	11
Lorenzo Aragón (CUB)	20
Ruslan Khairov (AZE)	26
Kanat Islam (CHN)	16
Bülent Ulusoy (TUR)	9
Sherzod Husanov (UZB)	23
Mohamed Hikal (EGY)	17
Oleg Saitov (RUS)	18
Viktor Polyakov (UKR)	32
Xavier Noël (FRA)	25
Bakhtiyar Artayev (KAZ)	33
Aliasker Bashirov (TKM)	23

Quarterfinals
Juan Camilo Novoa (COL)	23
Kim Jung-Joo (KOR)	25
Lorenzo Aragón (CUB)	16
Ruslan Khairov (AZE)	14
Sherzod Husanov (UZB)	14
Oleg Saitov (RUS)	22
Viktor Polyakov (UKR)
Bakhtiyar Artayev (KAZ)	RSC

Semifinals
Kim Jung-Joo (KOR)	10
Lorenzo Aragón (CUB)	38
Oleg Saitov (RUS)	18
Bakhtiyar Artayev (KAZ)	20

Finals
Lorenzo Aragón (CUB)	26
Bakhtiyar Artayev (KAZ)	36

Notes

- Adam Trupish (CAN) qualified for the Athens Games as a lucky semifinal loser in the second tournament in Tijuana, Mexico. He took the place of Juan McPherson (USA), a finalist from the 2003 Pan American Games.
- Basharmal Sultani of Afghanistan received a wild card from the IOC.
