= Boxing at the 2000 Summer Olympics – Welterweight =

Boxing competitions

Men's welterweight boxing at the Games of the XXVII Olympiad
- Venue: Sydney Convention and Exhibition Centre
- Date: 16 September to 30 September 2000
- Competitors: 28 from 28 nations

Medalists
1st place, gold medalist(s)		Oleg Saitov	Russia
2nd place, silver medalist(s)		Sergey Dotsenko	Ukraine
3rd place, bronze medalist(s)		Vitaly Gruşac	Moldova
3rd place, bronze medalist(s)		Dorel Simion	Romania

The men's welterweight boxing competition at the 2000 Olympic Games in Sydney was held from 16 September to 30 September at the Sydney Convention and Exhibition Centre.

== Competition format ==
Like all Olympic boxing events, the competition was a straight single-elimination tournament. This event consisted of 28 boxers who have qualified for the competition through various qualifying tournaments held in 1999 and 2000. The competition began with a preliminary round on 16 September, where the number of competitors was reduced to 16, and concluded with the final on 30 September. As there were fewer than 32 boxers in the competition, a number of boxers received a bye through the preliminary round. Both semi-final losers were awarded bronze medals.

All bouts consisted of four rounds of two minutes each, with one-minute breaks between rounds. Punches scored only if the white area on the front of the glove made full contact with the front of the head or torso of the opponent. Five judges scored each bout; three of the judges had to signal a scoring punch within one second for the punch to score. The winner of the bout was the boxer who scored the most valid punches by the end of the bout.

== Competitors ==
Name	Country
Kamel Chater	Tunisia
Ruslan Khairov	Azerbaijan
Oleg Saitov	Russia
Francisco Calderón	Colombia
Ellis Chibuye	Zambia
Roberto Guerra	Cuba
Rubén Fuchú	Puerto Rico
Dorel Simion	Romania
Mosolesa Tsie	Lesotho
Steven Küchler	Germany
Yovanni Lorenzo	Dominican Republic
Usman Ullah Khan	Pakistan
Geard Ajetović	FR Yugoslavia
Parkpoom Jangphonak	Thailand
Guillermo Saputo	Argentina
Sergey Dotsenko	Ukraine
Daniel Geale	Australia
Leonard Bundu	Italy
Paulus Ali Nuumbembe	Namibia
Daniyar Munaytbasov	Kazakhstan
Bülent Ulusoy	Turkey
Jin Suk-bae	South Korea
Fadel Showban	Egypt
Dante Craig	United States
Babk Moghimi	Iran
Sherzod Husanov	Uzbekistan
Tsegasellase Aregawi	Ethiopia
Vitaly Gruşac	Moldova

== Results ==
All times are Australian Time (UTC+10)

Round of 32; Saturday, September 16, 2000; 13:00 & 19:30
Ellis Chibuye (ZAM)	4
Roberto Guerra (CUB)	18
Rubén Fuchú (PUR)
Dorel Simion (ROM)	RSC
Mosolesa Tsie (LES)
Steven Küchler (GER)	RSC
Yovanny Lorenzo (DOM)	5
Usman Ullah Khan (PAK)	4
Geard Ajetović (YUG)	9
Parkpoom Jangphonak (THA)	9^{+}
Guillermo Saputo (ARG)	7
Sergey Dotsenko (UKR)	12
Daniel Geale (AUS)	2
Leonard Bundu (ITA)	4
Paulus Ali Nuumbembe (NAM)	2
Daniyar Munaytbasov (KAZ)	14
Bülent Ulusoy (TUR)	8
Bae Jin-seok (KOR)	6
Fadel Showban (EGY)
Dante Craig (USA)	RSC
Babak Moghimi (IRI)	5
Sherzod Husanov (UZB)	15
Tsegasellase Aregawi (ETH)
Vitaly Gruşac (MDA)	WO

Round of 16; Thursday, September 21, 2000; 13:00 & 19:30
Kamel Chater (TUN)	8
Ruslan Khairov (AZE)	13
Oleg Saitov (RUS)	15
Francisco Calderón (COL)	1
Roberto Guerra (CUB)	7
Dorel Simion (ROM)	11
Steven Küchler (GER)	RSC
Yovanni Lorenzo (DOM)
Parkpoom Jangphonak (THA)	5
Sergey Dotsenko (UKR)	13
Leonard Bundu (ITA)	4
Daniyar Munaytbasov (KAZ)	13
Bülent Ulusoy (TUR)	9
Dante Craig (USA)	4
Sherzod Husanov (UZB)	7
Vitaly Gruşac (MDA)	13

Quarter-finals; Tuesday, September 26, 2000; 13:00 & 19:30
Ruslan Khairov (AZE)	10
Oleg Saitov (RUS)	10^{+}
Dorel Simion (ROM)	26
Steven Küchler (GER)	14
Sergey Dotsenko (UKR)	8
Daniyar Munaytbasov (KAZ)	7
Bülent Ulusoy (TUR)	10
Vitaly Gruşac (MDA)	19

Semi-finals; Thursday, September 28, 2000; 19:30
Oleg Saitov (RUS)	19
Dorel Simion (ROM)	10
Sergey Dotsenko (UKR)	17
Vitaly Gruşac (MDA)	8

Final; Saturday, September 30, 2000; 13:00
Oleg Saitov (RUS)	24
Sergey Dotsenko (UKR)	16
