= Boxing at the 2008 Summer Olympics – Welterweight =

Boxing competitions

The welterweight competition was the fifth-highest weight class featured in amateur boxing at the 2008 Summer Olympics, and was held at the Workers Indoor Arena. Welterweights were limited to a maximum of 69 kilograms in body mass.

Like all Olympic boxing events, the competition was a straight single-elimination tournament. Both semifinal losers were awarded bronze medals, so no boxers competed again after their first loss. Bouts consisted of four rounds of two minutes each, with one-minute breaks between rounds. Punches scored only if the white area on the front of the glove made full contact with the front of the head or torso of the opponent. Five judges scored each bout; three of the judges had to signal a scoring punch within one second for the punch to score. The winner of the bout was the boxer who scored the most valid punches by the end of the bout.

== Medalists ==
| Gold | Bakhyt Sarsekbayev; Kazakhstan |
| Silver | Carlos Banteux; Cuba |
| Bronze | Hanati Silamu; China |
| Bronze | Kim Jung-Joo; South Korea |

== Schedule ==
All times are China Standard Time (UTC+8)

| Date | Time | Round |
|---|---|---|
| Sunday, August 10, 2008 | 15:30-16:55; 20:35-22:30 | Round of 32 |
| Thursday, August 14, 2008 | 13:30-14:30; 21:00-22:00 | Round of 16 |
| Sunday, August 17, 2008 | 20:01-21:00 | Quarterfinals |
| Friday, August 22, 2008 | 20:31-21:00 | Semifinals |
| Sunday, August 24, 2008 | 15:16-15:31 | Final Bout |

== Draw ==
=== Finals ===
Semifinals
1 | Carlos Banteux (CUB) | 17
4 | Hanati Silamu (CHN) | 4
3 | Bakhyt Sarsekbayev (KAZ) | 10
2 | Kim Jung-Joo (KOR) | 6

Final
Carlos Banteux (CUB) | 9
Bakhyt Sarsekbayev (KAZ) | 18

=== Top half ===
Round of 32
Billy Joe Saunders (GBR) | 14
Adem Kılıççı (TUR) | 3
Tureano Johnson (BAH) | 18
Rolande Moses (GRN) | 3
Gilbert Lenin Castillo (DOM) | 6
Olexandr Stretskyy (UKR) | 9
Precious Makina (ZAM) | 4
Hanati Silamu (CHN) | 21
Bruno Bongongo (CAF) | 2
Joseph Mulema (CMR) | 17

Round of 16
Non Boonjumnong (THA) | 10
Hosam Bakr Abdin (EGY) | 11
Carlos Banteux (CUB) | 13
Billy Joe Saunders (GBR) | 6
Tureano Johnson (BAH) | 9
Olexandr Stretskyy (UKR) | 4
Hanati Silamu (CHN) | 9
Joseph Mulema (CMR) | 4

Quarterfinals
Hosam Bakr Abdin (EGY) | 2
Carlos Banteux (CUB) | 10
Tureano Johnson (BAH) | 4
Hanati Silamu (CHN) | 14

Semifinals
Carlos Banteux (CUB) | 17
Hanati Silamu (CHN) | 4

=== Bottom half ===
Round of 32
Bakhyt Sarsekbayev (KAZ) | 20
Adam Trupish (CAN) | 1
Vitalie Gruşac (MDA) | 7
Gerard O'Mahony (AUS) | 2
Aliasker Bashirov (TKM) | 6
Jaoid Chiguer (FRA) | 17
Mehdi Khalsi (MAR) | 3
Dilshod Mahmudov (UZB) | 11
Demetrius Andrade (USA) | 11
Kakhaber Zhvania (GEO) | 9
Mujandjae Kasuto (NAM) | 5
Andrey Balanov (RUS) | 8
Magomed Nurutdinov (BLR) | 2
John Jackson (ISV) | 4
Jack Culcay-Keth (GER) | 11
Kim Jung-Joo (KOR) | +11

Round of 16
Bakhyt Sarsekbayev (KAZ) | RSCI
Vitalie Gruşac (MDA)
Jaoid Chiguer (FRA) | 3
Dilshod Mahmudov (UZB) | 8
Demetrius Andrade (USA) | 14
Andrey Balanov (RUS) | 3
John Jackson (ISV) | 0
Kim Jung-Joo (KOR) | 10

Quarterfinals
Bakhyt Sarsekbayev (KAZ) | 12
Dilshod Mahmudov (UZB) | 7
Demetrius Andrade (USA) | 9
Kim Jung-Joo (KOR) | 11

Semifinals
Bakhyt Sarsekbayev (KAZ) | 10
Kim Jung-Joo (KOR) | 6

== See also ==
- 2009 World Amateur Boxing Championships – Welterweight
