= Iran national amateur boxing athletes =

Iran national amateur boxing athletes represents the Islamic Republic of Iran in regional, continental and world tournaments and matches sanctioned by the Amateur International Boxing Association (AIBA).

== Olympics ==
Emmanuel Agassi, father of famous tennis player, Andre Agassi, represented Iran as a boxer in the 1948 and 1952 Summer Olympics.

== Asian Games ==
Year	Venue	Medalists		
Year	Venue	Gold	Silver	Bronze
1954		Did not participate		
1958	Tokyo	—	Vazik Kazarian; Soren Pirjanian; Ghasem Amiryavari	Ezaria Ilkhanoff; Leon Khachatourian; Akbar Khojini
1962		Did not participate		
1966	Bangkok	—	—	Nasser Aghaei; Eltefat Talebi; Aloush Abbasi; Hossein Fathianpour
1970	Bangkok	—	Omran Khatami	Mohammad Saroukhani; Gholam Hossein Pakmanesh
1974	Tehran	Sharif Delaram; Masis Hambarsumian; Abdolreza Andaveh	Abdolreza Ansari; Jabbar Feli	Hamlet Minasian; Hossein Madardoust; Farshid Enteghami; Ahmad Poureftekhari; Vartex Parsanian
1978–1986		Did not participate		
1990	Beijing	—	Ali Asghar Kazemi	Siamak Varzideh; Iraj Kiarostami
1994	Hiroshima	Ayoub Pourtaghi	Mohammad Reza Samadi	Anoushiravan Nourian; Bahman Azizpour
1998	Bangkok	—	Mohammad Reza Samadi	Rouhollah Hosseini
2002		Did not participate		
2006	Doha	Ali Mazaheri	—	Mohammad Sattarpour; Mehdi Ghorbani; Jasem Delavari
2010	Guangzhou	—	—	Mohammad Sattarpour; Ali Mazaheri; Rouhollah Hosseini
2014	Incheon	—	Ali Mazaheri; Jasem Delavari	Ehsan Rouzbahani
2018	Jakarta	—	—	—
2022	Hangzhou	—	—	—

== Asian Championships ==
Year	Venue	Medalists		
Year	Venue	Gold	Silver	Bronze
1963	Bangkok	Nasser Aghaei	Iraj Salami Kohan; Ahmad Tariverdi; Akbar Khojini	Khosro Alimardani; Hossein Fathianpour
1965		Did not participate		
1967	Colombo	Aloush Abbasi; Omran Khatami	Sako Melikian	Wilhelm Younani; Nasser Aghaei; Eltefat Talebi; Masoud Keshmiri
1970		Did not participate		
1971	Tehran	Sohrab Vakil Monfared; Abdollah Ghasemi; Masoud Hajrasouli	Ramon Babaei; Masoud Keshmiri	Manouchehr Bahmani; Mohsen Sahafi; Hosseingholi Nohroudi; Mehdi Hoviatdoust
1973	Bangkok	Jabbar Feli; Abdolreza Andaveh	Abdollatif Etmanzadeh; Farshid Enteghami	Ghasem Salmasdani; Hossein Eghmaz; Mohammad Agharezaei; Masis Hambarsumian
1975	Yokohama	Parviz Badpa	Farshid Enteghami	—
1977	Jakarta	Hassan Ebrahimzadeh; Mohammad Azarhazin; Karim Samadi; Parviz Badpa	Nasser Alibabaei; Masis Hambarsumian	Jabbar Feli
1980	Mumbai	Mansour Sadeghi	Afshar Asadi	Hossein Alinejad; Masis Hambarsumian
1982–1989		Did not participate		
1991	Bangkok	Saeid Sarabizadeh	—	—
1992	Bangkok	—	—	Anoushiravan Nourian; Yousef Khateri
1994	Tehran	Bijan Batmani; Ayoub Pourtaghi	Asadollah Johari; Morteza Shiri; Iraj Kiarostami	Akbar Ahadi; Pejman Chalak
1995	Tashkent	Mohammad Reza Samadi	Kourosh Molaei	Omid Rashid; Ayoub Pourtaghi; Bahman Azizpour
1997	Kuala Lumpur	Babak Moghimi; Esfandiar Mohammadi; Mohammad Reza Samadi	Akbar Ahadi; Bijan Batmani	—
1999	Tashkent	—	—	Mohammad Rahim Rahimi; Esfandiar Mohammadi; Homayoun Amiri; Jamal Sanati; Rouhollah Hosseini
2002	Seremban	—	Mohammad Reza Gharouni; Rouhollah Hosseini; Alireza Esteki	—
2004	Puerto Princesa	—	—	Reza Ghasemi; Taher Jabbari; Ali Mazaheri
2005	Ho Chi Minh City	Rouhollah Hosseini	Noureddin Chegini	Reza Ghasemi; Homayoun Amiri
2007	Ulaanbaatar	Ali Mazaheri	—	Foroutan Golara; Houman Karami; Saeid Norouzi; Mohammad Sattarpour
2009	Zhuhai	—	Houman Karami	Ali Mazaheri; Ali Akbar Hosseinifar
2011	Incheon	—	Abdolmajid Sepahvandi	Mohammad Nouripour
2013	Amman	—	—	Sajjad Mehrabi; Ehsan Rouzbahani; Jasem Delavari
2015	Bangkok	—	—	Sajjad Mehrabi; Hassan Shahini; Reza Moradkhani
2017	Tashkent	—	—	Sajjad Kazemzadeh
2019	Bangkok	—	—	Shahin Mousavi
2021	Dubai	—	Danial Shahbakhsh; Meisam Gheshlaghi	Shahin Mousavi; Pouria Amiri
2022	Amman	—	—	Shahin Mousavi; Toufan Sharifi
2024	Chiang Mai	Did not participate		
