= Boxing at the 1996 Summer Olympics – Welterweight =

Boxing competitions

Welterweight boxing at the Games of the XXVI Olympiad
- Venue: Alexander Memorial Coliseum
- Dates: 20 July – 3 August 1996
- Competitors: 32 from 32 nations

Medalists
1st place, gold medalist(s)		Oleg Saitov	Russia
2nd place, silver medalist(s)		Juan Hernández Sierra	Cuba
3rd place, bronze medalist(s)		Daniel Santos	Puerto Rico
3rd place, bronze medalist(s)		Marian Simion	Romania

The Welterweight class in the boxing at the 1996 Summer Olympics competition was the fifth-heaviest class at the 1996 Summer Olympics in Atlanta, Georgia. The weight class was open for boxers weighing more than 67 kilograms. The competition in the Alexander Memorial Coliseum started on 1996-07-20 and ended on 1996-08-04.

== Medalists ==
Gold	Oleg Saitov; Russia
Silver	Juan Hernández Sierra; Cuba
Bronze	Daniel Santos; Puerto Rico
Bronze	Marian Simion; Romania

== Results ==
Round of 32
Rogelio Martinez (DOM)	2:35
Hasan Al (DEN)	RSCI-3
Parkpoom Jangphonak (THA)	10
Sergeiy Dzinziruk (UKR)	20
Tengiz Meskhadze (GEO)	4
Fernando Vargas (USA)	10
Hussein Bayram (FRA)	6
Marian Simion (ROM)	13
Lucas Sinoia (MOZ)	6
Vadim Mezga (BLR)	11
József Nagy (HUN)	1:48
Juan Hernandez (CUB)	RSC-2
Nurzhan Smanov (KAZ)	RSC-2
Lynden Hosking (AUS)	1:42
Abdul Rasheed (PAK)	12
Jesús Flores (MEX)	7
Cahit Süme (TUR)	1
Oleg Saitov (RUS)	11
Guillermo Saputo (ARG)	7
Bae Ho-jo (KOR)	11
Hassan Mzonge (TAN)	7
Vitalijus Karpaciauskas (LTU)	32
Kamel Chater (TUN)	TB
Hercules Kyvelos (CAN)	4:4
Nariman Atayev (UZB)	15
Ashira Evans (KEN)	10
Shane Heaps (TGA)	2
Nurbek Kasenov (KGZ)	11
Luis Hernández (ECU)	9
Kabil Lahsen (MAR)	18
Daniel Santos (PUR)	RSC-1
Ernest Atangana Mboa (CMR)	2:54

Round of 16
Hasan Al (DEN)	10
Sergeiy Dzinziruk (UKR)	4
Fernando Vargas (USA)	7
Marian Simion (ROM)	8
Vadim Mezga (BLR)	2
Juan Hernandez (CUB)	12
Nurzhan Smanov (KAZ)	13
Abdul Rasheed (PAK)	9
Oleg Saitov (RUS)	9
Ho-Jo Bae (KOR)	5
Vitalijus Karpaciauskas (LTU)	1:16
Kamel Chater (TUN)	RSC-1
Nariman Atayev (UZB)	11
Nourbeck Kassenov (KGZ)	7
Kabil Lahsen (MAR)	4
Daniel Santos (PUR)	16

Quarterfinals
Hasan Al (DEN)	8
Marian Simion (ROM)	16
Juan Hernandez (CUB)	16
Nurzhan Smanov (KAZ)	8
Oleg Saitov (RUS)	9
Kamel Chater (TUN)	3
Nariman Atayev (UZB)	15
Daniel Santos (PUR)	28

Semifinals
Marian Simion (ROM)	7
Juan Hernandez (CUB)	20
Oleg Saitov (RUS)	13
Daniel Santos (PUR)	11

Final
Juan Hernandez (CUB)	9
Oleg Saitov (RUS)	14
