= Lorenzo Aragón =

Cuban boxer

Personal information
- Nickname: El bárbaro del ring ("The Barbarian")
- Nationality: Cuba
- Born: Lorenzo Aragón Armenteros; April 28, 1974 (age 52) Santa Isabel de las Lajas, Cienfuegos
- Height: 1.63 m (5 ft 4 in)
- Weight: Featherweight; Welterweight

Boxing career
Medal record
Olympic Games
Silver medal – second place	2004 Athens	Welterweight
World Amateur Championships
Gold medal – first place	2001 Belfast	Welterweight
Gold medal – first place	2003 Bangkok	Welterweight
Pan American Games
Gold medal – first place	2003 Santo Domingo	Welterweight

Lorenzo Aragón Armenteros (born April 28, 1974) is a former amateur boxer from Cuba, who was a two-time world champion in the welterweight category.

== Amateur career ==
Aragón took up boxing at the age of 12. In 1991, a 17-year-old Aragón won a bronze medal in Playa Girón, Cuba's national amateur boxing tournament. Aragón became the youngest boxer to ever medal in that competition. In 1992, Aragón would go on to win the tournament and win the flyweight gold medal in the 1992 AIBA Youth World Boxing Championships. He competed at the 1996 Olympics as a featherweight, losing in the quarterfinals to Floyd Mayweather. Aragón got a flash knockdown over Mayweather but he'd lose by a single point.

Between 1992 and 2004, Aragón won the Playa Girón tournament 10 times across 6 different weight classes, defeating boxers like Mario Kindelan, Arnaldo Mesa, and Erislandy Lara. Aragón would eventually settle in the welterweight division, where he won several international competitions.

Aragón won the 2001 World Championships at welterweight, beating Anthony Thompson in the final. He repeated his win in 2003 defeating Andre Berto in the semifinals and Sherzod Husanov in the final bout. Aragón was also the 2003 Pan American Games champion in the same division.

At the 2004 Summer Olympics he won a silver medal. He beat Vanes Martirosyan in the semifinals. In the final, Aragón was upset by surprise winner Bakhtiyar Artayev with a score of 36-26. Before the Athens Games, he won the 2004 Acropolis Boxing Cup in Athens, Greece by defeating Ruslan Khairov in the final of the welterweight division.

== Olympic results ==
1996 (Featherweight)

- Defeated Nouzedinne Medjihoud (Algeria) 9-6
- Defeated Rogerio de Brito (Brazil) 16-6
- Lost to Floyd Mayweather Jr. (United States) 11-12

2004 (Welterweight)

- Defeated Theodoros Kotakos (Greece) RSC-3 (1:29)
- Defeated Vanes Martirosyan (United States) 20-11
- Defeated Ruslan Khairov (Azerbaijan) 16-14
- Defeated Kim Jung-Joo (South Korea) 38-10
- Lost to Bakhtiyar Artayev (Kazakhstan) 36-26

== World championship results ==
=== 2001 ===
- Defeated Ryan Savage (Canada) RSC 3
- Defeated Bae Ho-Jo (South Korea) RSC 3
- Defeated Timour Gaidalov (Russia) 27-15
- Defeated Sherzod Husanov (Uzbekistan) RSC 2
- Defeated Anthony Thompson (United States) 27-15

=== 2003 ===
- Defeated Vilmos Balog (Hungary) 23-8
- Defeated Bulent Ulusoy (Turkey) 18-17
- Defeated Spas Genov (Bulgaria) 24-15
- Defeated Non Boonjumnong (Thailand) RSC 2
- Defeated Andre Berto (United States) 25-15
- Defeated Sherzod Husanov uzb.,17:9

== Other amateur highlights ==
- 1992 Cuban amateur flyweight champion
- 1992 Under-19 flyweight world champion.
- 1994 Cuban amateur bantamweight champion
- 1994 Pan-American bantamweight champion
- 1995 Cuban amateur lightweight champion
- 1996 Cuban amateur featherweight champion
- 1997 Cuban amateur lightweight champion
- 1998 Cuban amateur Light welterweight champion
- 1999 Cuban amateur welterweight champion
- 2001 Cuban amateur welterweight champion
- 2003 Cuban amateur welterweight champion
- 2003 gold medalist at Pan-American Games in Santo Domingo, Dominican Republic. Results were:
  - Defeated Fabián Leonardo Velardes (Argentina) 23-4
  - Defeated Euris Gonzalez (Dominican Republic) 25-4
  - Defeated Juan McPherson (United States) 30-11
- 2004 Cuban amateur welterweight champion
