= Puerto Rico at the 2000 Summer Olympics =

- IOC code: PUR
- NOC: Puerto Rico Olympic Committee
- Website: www.copur.pr (in Spanish)

in Sydney
- Competitors: 29 (23 men and 6 women) in 10 sports
- Flag bearer: Enrique Figueroa
- Medals: Gold 0 Silver 0 Bronze 0 Total 0

Summer Olympics appearances (overview)
- 1948; 1952; 1956; 1960; 1964; 1968; 1972; 1976; 1980; 1984; 1988; 1992; 1996; 2000; 2004; 2008; 2012; 2016; 2020; 2024; 2028

Puerto Rico competed at the 2000 Summer Olympics in Sydney, Australia. It was their fourteenth appearance at the Olympics, after debuting in 1948. 29 competitors, 23 men and 6 women, took part in 31 events in 10 sports.

== Competitors ==
The following is the list of number of competitors in the Games.

Sport	Men	Women	Total
Athletics	4	4	8
Boxing	5	–	5
Diving	0	1	1
Fencing	1	0	1
Gymnastics	1	0	1
Judo	4	0	4
Sailing	2	0	2
Shooting	2	0	2
Swimming	3	0	3
Weightlifting	1	1	2
Total	23	6	29

== Athletics ==
Men
Track & road events

Athlete	Event	Heat		Quarterfinal		Semifinal		Final	
Athlete	Event	Result	Rank	Result	Rank	Result	Rank	Result	Rank
Félix Omar Fernández; Osvaldo Nieves; Rogelio Pizarro; Jorge Richardson	4 × 100 m relay	40.12	32	—N/a		Did not advance			

Women
Track & road events

Athlete	Event	Heat		Quarterfinal		Semifinal		Final	
Athlete	Event	Result	Rank	Result	Rank	Result	Rank	Result	Rank
Militza Castro; Beatriz Cruz; Sandra Moya; Maritza Salas	4 × 400 m relay	03:33.30	18	—N/a		Did not advance			

== Boxing ==
Athlete	Event	Round of 32	Round of 16	Quarterfinal	Semifinal	Final	
Athlete	Event	Opposition Result	Opposition Result	Opposition Result	Opposition Result	Opposition Result	Rank
Iván Calderón	Light flyweight	Masara (SIN); L 9–10	Did not advance				
Carlos Valcárcel	Flyweight	Narváez (ARG); L 6–12	Did not advance				
Orlando Cruz	Bantamweight	Blida (ALG); L 10–11	Did not advance				
Miguel Cotto	Light Welterweight	Abdullaev (UZB); L 7–117	Did not advance				
Rubén Fuchú	Welterweight	Simion (ROU); L RSC	Did not advance				

== Diving ==
Women

Athlete	Event	Preliminary		Semifinal				Final		Total	
Athlete	Event	Points	Rank	Points	Rank	Total	Rank	Points	Rank	Points	Rank
Angelique Rodriguez	3 m springboard	235.47	27	Did not advance							27
Angelique Rodriguez	10 m platform	273.36	17	134.94	17	408.30	18	Did not advance			18

== Fencing ==
Men

Athlete	Event	Round of 64	Round of 32	Round of 16	Quarterfinal	Semifinal	Final / BM	
Athlete	Event	Opposition Result	Opposition Result	Opposition Result	Opposition Result	Opposition Result	Opposition Result	Rank
Jonathan Peña	Individual épée	Pchenikin (BLR); L 11–15	Did not advance					36

== Gymnastics ==
Men

Athlete	Event	Qualification								Final							
Athlete	Event	Apparatus						Total	Rank	Apparatus						Total	Rank
Athlete	Event	F	PH	R	V	PB	HB	Total	Rank	F	PH	R	V	PB	HB	Total	Rank
Diego Lizardi	Individual	8.537	8.000	9.162	9.137	8.275	9.150	52.261	49	Did not advance							

== Judo ==
Men

Athlete	Event	First round	Round of 32	Round of 16	Quarterfinal	Semifinal	Repechage 1	Repechage 2	Repechage 3	Repechage 4	Final / BM	
Athlete	Event	Opposition Result	Opposition Result	Opposition Result	Opposition Result	Opposition Result	Opposition Result	Opposition Result	Opposition Result	Opposition Result	Opposition Result	Rank
Melvin Méndez	–66 kg	Bye	Giovinazzo (ITA); L 0000–1000	Did not advance			Guimaraes (BRA); L 0000–0011	Did not advance				
Carlos Méndez	–73 kg	Bye	Illyés (HUN); L 0000–0200	Did not advance								
José Luis Figueroa	–81 kg	Bye	Cho (KOR); L 0001–1110	Did not advance			Wanner (GER); L 0000–1001	Did not advance				
Carlos Santiago	–90 kg	Bye	López (COL); W 1001–0011	Demontfaucon (FRA); L 0001–0020	Did not advance		Mashurenko (UKR); L 0000–1000	Did not advance				

== Sailing ==
Men

Athlete	Event	Race											Net Points	Rank
Athlete	Event	1	2	3	4	5	6	7	8	9	10	11	Net Points	Rank
Enrique Figueroa; Pedro Colon	Tornado	~~11~~	11	1	7	9	2	4	8	~~13~~	11	5	58	8

== Shooting ==
Men

Athlete	Event	Qualification		Final		Total	
Athlete	Event	Points	Rank	Points	Rank	Points	Rank
Ralph Rodríguez	50 m rifle prone	578	52	Did not advance			
Roberto Carlo	Skeet	118	=32	Did not advance			

== Swimming ==
Men

Athlete	Event	Heat		Semifinal		Final	
Athlete	Event	Time	Rank	Time	Rank	Time	Rank
Ricardo Busquets	50 m freestyle	22.42	6 Q	22.51	15	Did not advance	
Andrew Livingston	100 m butterfly	55.03	32	Did not advance			
Andrew Livingston	200 m butterfly	1:59.05	15	1:58.63	13	Did not advance	
Arsenio López	100 m breaststroke	1:04.02	34	Did not advance			
Arsenio López	200 m individual medley	2:06.49	34	Did not advance			

== Weightlifting ==
Women

Athlete	Event	Snatch			Clean & Jerk			Total	Rank
Athlete	Event	1	2	3	1	2	3	Total	Rank
Ruth Rivera	Light-Heavyweight (– 69 kg)	~~82.5~~	82.5	~~85.0~~	100.0	105.0	~~107.5~~	187.5	13

== See also ==
- Puerto Rico at the 1999 Pan American Games

== Notes ==
- sports-reference
- Wallechinsky, David (2004). The Complete Book of the Summer Olympics (Athens 2004 Edition). Toronto, Canada. ISBN 1-894963-32-6.
- International Olympic Committee (2001). The Results. Retrieved 12 November 2005.
- Sydney Organising Committee for the Olympic Games (2001). Official Report of the XXVII Olympiad Volume 1: Preparing for the Games. Retrieved 20 November 2005.
- Sydney Organising Committee for the Olympic Games (2001). Official Report of the XXVII Olympiad Volume 2: Celebrating the Games. Retrieved 20 November 2005.
- Sydney Organising Committee for the Olympic Games (2001). The Results. Retrieved 20 November 2005.
- International Olympic Committee Web Site
