= Kanat Islam =

Kazakhstani boxer (born 1984)

Personal information
- Nickname: QazaQ
- Nationality: Kazakh
- Born: Қанат Ислам; 13 September 1984 (age 42) Altay City, Xinjiang, China
- Height: 1.78 m (5 ft 10 in)
- Weight: Light-middleweight; Middleweight

Boxing career
- Reach: 70 in (178 cm)
- Stance: Orthodox

Boxing record
- Total fights: 30
- Wins: 29
- Win by KO: 22
- Losses: 1
- Draws: 0
- No contests: 0
Medal record
Olympic Games
Bronze medal – third place	2008 Beijing	Welterweight
World Amateur Championships
Bronze medal – third place	2007 Chicago	Welterweight
Asian Games
Bronze medal – third place	2006 Doha	Welterweight
Asian Championships
Bronze medal – third place	2007 Ulan Bator	Welterweight

Kanat Islam (Kazakh: Қанат Ислам, Qanat İslam; Chinese: 哈那提·斯拉木; pinyin: Hānàtí Sīlāmù; born 13 September 1984) is a Chinese-born Kazakhstani professional boxer who currently lives and trains in Miami. As an amateur, he represented China, winning bronze medals at the 2008 Summer Olympics, 2007 World Championships and the 2006 Asian Games.

== Amateur career ==
At the 2004 Olympics, he lost his match to Ruslan Khairov. He qualified for the Athens Games by ending up in first place at the 1st AIBA Asian 2004 Olympic Qualifying Tournament in Guangzhou, China. In the final he defeated Aliasker Bashirov of Turkmenistan.

At the Asian Games 2006, he beat Behzodek Yunusov in round one but lost to eventual southpaw winner Bakhyt Sarsekbayev in the semi-finals 30:37.

At the 2007 World Amateur Boxing Championships, he beat Yusunov again, then upset old foes Ruslan Khairov and Bakhyt Sarsekbayev 20:14 but lost to Non Boonjumnong 20:23 in the semi-finals.

Islam beat Zambian boxer, Precious Makina, in the Men's Welterweight (69 kg) Round of 32 on the second day of the 2008 Beijing Olympics.

=== Olympic Games results ===
2004 (as a welterweight)

- Defeated Sadat Tebazaalwa (Uganda) 29-17
- Lost to Ruslan Khairov (Azerbaijan) 16-26

2008 (as a welterweight)

- Defeated Precious Makina (Zambia) 21-4
- Defeated Joseph Mulema (Cameroon) 9-4
- Defeated Tureano Johnson (Bahamas) 14-4
- Lost to Carlos Banteux (Cuba) 4-17 ( Bronze)

=== World Amateur Championships results ===
2007 (as a welterweight)

- Defeated Bohzodbek Yunusov (Uzbekistan) 22-16
- Defeated Gerard O'Mahony (Australia) 23-17
- Defeated Ruslan Khairov (Azerbaijan) 26-6
- Defeated Bakhyt Sarsekbayev (Kazakhstan) 20-14
- Lost to Manon Boonjumnong (Thailand) 20-23 ( Bronze)

== Professional career ==
In 2012, Kanat turned pro and decided to train in the U.S. state of Florida. He was captain of the "Astana Arlans" in the World Series of Boxing (WSB). In January 2011, after arriving in Kazakhstan at the request of Kazakh businessman and philanthropist Baurzhan Ospanov, Islam became a citizen of Kazakhstan.

On September 9, 2017, Islam faced Brandon Cook. Islam managed to stop Cook in the ninth round, giving him his first early stoppage lost in his career.

In his next fight, Islam made easy work of Julio De Jesus. Islam landed two big overhand rights in the opening round, dropping De Jesus, who was unable to continue the fight, resulting in an impressive win for the Kazakh.

In his following fight, Islam, then ranked #8 by the WBO, faced Walter Kautondokwa, ranked #9 by the same organisation. Neither fighter stood out with his performance, Islam being the one who landed less but was more precise. Kautondokwa was the better man towards the end of the fight, but that was not enough for the judges, who had it 99-92, 97-92 and 97-92 for Islam, in what was considered a controversial decision by the judges.

== Professional boxing record ==
30 fights	29 wins	1 loss
By knockout	22	0
By decision	5	1
By disqualification	2	0

No.	Record	Result	Opponent	Type	Round, time	Date	Location	Notes
30	Win	29-1	(Argentina) Javier Francisco Maciel	UD	8	7 Oct 2022	(United States) Whitesands Events Center, Plant City, Florida, U.S.	
29	Loss	28-1	(United Kingdom) Jimmy Kelly	MD	10	25 Feb 2022	(United States) Whitesands Events Center, Plant City, Florida, U.S.	For vacant WBO global middleweight title
28	Win	28–0	(Ecuador) Jeyson Minda	TKO	7 (10) 2:43	20 Feb 2021	(United States) Doubletree Miamimart Hotel, Miami, Florida, U.S.	
27	Win	27–0	(Namibia) Walter Kautondokwa	UD	10	26 Oct 2019	Baluan Sholak Sports Palace, Almaty, Kazakhstan	Retained WBO International middleweight title
26	Win	26–0	(Dominican Republic) Julio De Jesus	KO	1 (12), 2:50	5 Jul 2019	Baluan Sholak Sports Palace, Almaty, Kazakhstan	Won vacant WBO International middleweight title
25	Win	25–0	(Canada) Brandon Cook	TKO	9 (12), 2:40	9 Sep 2017	Saryarka Velodrome, Astana, Kazakhstan	Retained WBA Inter-Continental and WBO-NABO light-middleweight titles; Won WBA-NABA light-middleweight title
24	Win	24–0	(Mexico) Noberto Gonzalez	UD	12	26 May 2017	(United States) Boca Rato Hotel & Club, Boca Raton, Florida, US	Won vacant WBA Inter-Continental and WBO-NABO light-middleweight titles
23	Win	23–0	(Brazil) Robson Assis	KO	1 (10), 2:12	17 Feb 2017	(United States) Chase Center, Wilmington, Delaware, US	
22	Win	22–0	(Ghana) Patrick Allotey	UD	10	29 Oct 2016	Almaty Arena, Almaty, Kazakhstan	Retained WBA Fedelatin light-middleweight title; Won vacant WBO Inter-Continental light-middleweight title
21	Win	21–0	(Colombia) Juan De Angel	TKO	6 (10), 0:22	8 May 2016	(United States) Lakeland Event Center, Lakeland, Florida, US	
20	Win	20–0	(Dominican Republic) Jonathan Batista	TKO	1 (10), 2:14	7 Nov 2015	(United States) Miccosukee Indian Gaming Resort, Miami, Florida, US	
19	Win	19–0	(Colombia) Orlando de Jesus Estrada	TKO	4 (12), 0:32	23 Mar 2015	Estudios de Telecaribe, Barranquilla, Colombia	Retained WBA Fedelatin light-middleweight title
18	Win	18–0	(Colombia) Fidel Monterrosa Munoz	KO	5 (8), 2:50	7 Aug 2014	Estudios de Telecaribe, Barranquilla, Colombia	Retained WBA Fedelatin light-middleweight title
17	Win	17–0	(Colombia) Francisco Cordero	RTD	3 (12), 3:00	23 May 2014	Centro Recreacional Las Vegas, Barranquilla, Colombia	Retained WBA Fedelatin light-middleweight title
16	Win	16–0	(Dominican Republic) Basilio Silva	DQ	6 (10), 2:01	16 Dec 2013	Casa de Los Clubes, Villa Juana, Dominican Republic	
15	Win	15–0	(Colombia) Emilio Julio Julio	KO	3 (12), 1:44	29 Nov 2013	Coliseo Julio Cesar Hidalgo, Quito, Ecuador	Won vacant WBA Fedelatin light-middleweight title
14	Win	14–0	(Dominican Republic) Junior Ramos	RTD	1 (10), 3:00	9 Nov 2013	Coliseo Pedro Julio Nolasco, La Romana, Dominican Republic	
13	Win	13–0	(Dominican Republic) Jose Antonio Rodriguez	RTD	1 (8), 3:00	10 May 2013	Coliseo Carlos 'Teo' Cruz, Santo Domingo, Dominican Republic	
12	Win	12–0	(Ecuador) Eduardo Flores	UD	10	26 Apr 2013	Coliseo Julio César Hidalgo, Quito, Ecuador	Retained WBA Fedecaribe light-middleweight title
11	Win	11–0	(Dominican Republic) Jose Vidal Soto	KO	1 (8), 2:57	19 Apr 2013	Polideportivo San Martin de Porre, La Romana, Dominican Republic	
10	Win	10–0	(Cuba) Yolexcy Martinez-Leiva	TKO	2 (10), 0:31	6 Apr 2013	(United States) Miami Jai Alai Fronton, Miami, Florida, US	
9	Win	9–0	(Dominican Republic) Joselito del Rosario	DQ	2 (10), 2:20	23 Mar 2013	Gimnasio Pedro Cruz, Santiago de los Caballeros, Dominican Republic	
8	Win	8–0	(Ecuador) Humberto Toledo	KO	1 (10), 0:33	15 Dec 2012	Coliseo Pedro Julio Nolasco, La Romana, Dominican Republic	Won vacant WBA Fedecaribe light-middleweight title
7	Win	7–0	(Colombia) Reynaldo Esquivia	TKO	5 (6), 2:14	30 Nov 2012	Hotel Prado Mar, Puerto Colombia, Colombia	
6	Win	6–0	(Colombia) Felipe Polo	KO	3 (6), 2:31	24 Nov 2012	Estadio de Softbol Cesar Tou Caraballo, Tolu, Colombia	
5	Win	5–0	(Dominican Republic) Jose Antonio Rodriguez	RTD	3 (6), 3:00	10 Nov 2012	Club el Millon, Santo Domingo, Dominican Republic	
4	Win	4–0	(Dominican Republic) Nelsido Miguel Agramonte	TKO	1 (6), 2:49	29 Oct 2012	Coliseo Pedro Julio Nolasco, La Romana, Dominican Republic	
3	Win	3–0	(Dominican Republic) Modesto Felix	TKO	1 (6), 0:37	18 Oct 2012	Club el Millon, Santo Domingo, Dominican Republic	
2	Win	2–0	(Dominican Republic) Aneudy Martes	TKO	2 (4), 1:33	2 Oct 2012	Gimnasio Joan Guzman, Guachupita, Dominican Republic	
1	Win	1–0	(Dominican Republic) Daniel Beato	KO	3 (4), 2:42	28 Sep 2012	Casa Puerto Rico, La Romana, Dominican Republic	
