= Boxing at the 1997 Mediterranean Games =

Boxing competition

- Location: Bari, Italy
- Dates: 14–19 June 1997

Boxing was one of the sports held at the 1997 Mediterranean Games.

== Medalists ==
Event	Gold	Silver	Bronze
Light Flyweight (–48 kilograms)	Mimoun Chent (FRA)	Hassen Jelassi (TUN)	Rafael Lozano (ESP) Abdel Kebir Ghennam (MAR)
Flyweight (–51 kilograms)	Carmine Molaro (ITA)	Mahdi Assous (ALG)	Roudik Kazantzian (CYP) Bedri Çınar (TUR)
Bantamweight (–54 kilograms)	Soner Karagöz (TUR)	Sergio Spatafora (ITA)	Riadh Kalai (TUN) Abdelaziz Boulahia (ALG)
Featherweight (–57 kilograms)	Serdar Yağlı (TUR)	Noureddine Medjhoud (ALG)	Hicham Nafil (MAR) Boris Georgiadis (GRE)
Lightweight (–60 kilograms)	Mohamed Allalou (ALG)	Mohamed Ali Ben Naceur (TUN)	Tigran Ouzlian (GRE) Hassan Khabbout (MAR)
Light Welterweight (–63.5 kilograms)	Nurhan Süleymanoğlu (TUR)	Ciro Di Corcia (ITA)	Kamel Chater (TUN) Christophe Canclaux (FRA)
Welterweight (–67 kilograms)	Leonard Bundu (ITA)	Bülent Ulusoy (TUR)	Laureano Leiva (ESP) Theodoros Kotakos (GRE)
Light Middleweight (–71 kilograms)	Mohamed Marmouri (TUN)	Ercüment Aslan (TUR)	Christian Sanavia (ITA) Antonios Giannoulas (GRE)
Middleweight (–75 kilograms)	Raffaele Bergamasco (ITA)	Jean Paul Mendy (FRA)	Malik Beyleroğlu (TUR) Yuri Kyriakidis (GRE)
Light Heavyweight (–81 kilograms)	Georgios Mourlas (GRE)	Stipe Drviš (CRO)	Edmond Hoxha (ALB); Frederic Serrat (FRA)
Heavyweight (–91 kilograms)	Giacobbe Fragomeni (ITA)	Mohamed Ben Guesmia (ALG)	Esmir Kukić (BIH); Amro Moustafa El Sayed (EGY)
Super Heavyweight (+91 kilograms)	Paolo Vidoz (ITA)	Sinan Şamil Sam (TUR)	Mirko Filipović (CRO); Lymberis Flessias (GRE)

== Medal table ==
Place	Nation	1st place, gold medalist(s)	2nd place, silver medalist(s)	3rd place, bronze medalist(s)	Total
1	Italy	5	2	1	8
2	Turkey	3	3	2	8
3	Algeria	1	3	1	5
4	Tunisia	1	2	2	5
5	France	1	1	2	4
6	Greece	1	0	6	7
7	Croatia	0	1	1	2
8	Morocco	0	0	3	3
9	Spain	0	0	2	2
10	Albania	0	0	1	1
10	Bosnia and Herzegovina	0	0	1	1
10	Cyprus	0	0	1	1
10	Egypt	0	0	1	1
Total		12	12	24	48
