= Bakhtiyar Artayev =

Kazakhstani boxer (born 1983)

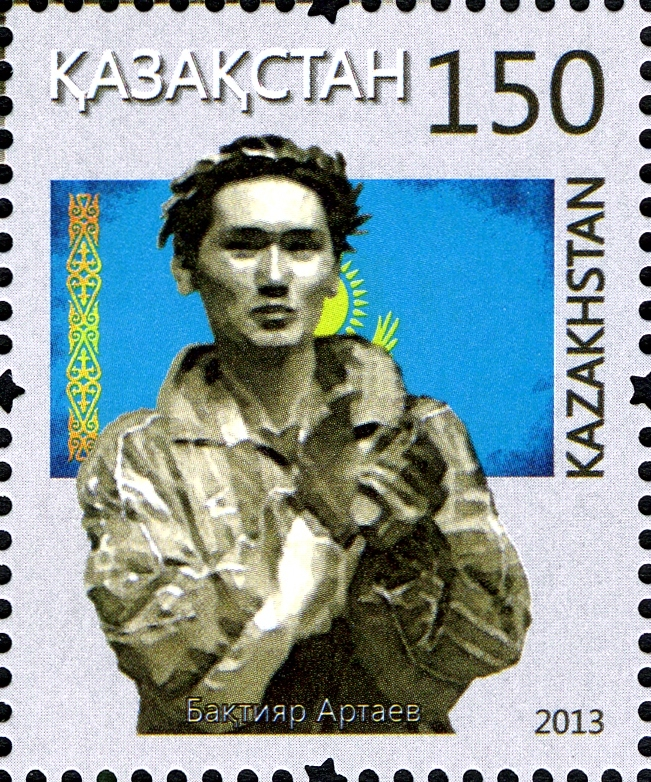
- Artayev depicted on a stamp from Kazakhstan

Personal information
- Full name: Bakhtiyar Garifollauly Artayev
- Nationality: Kazakh
- Born: 14 March 1983 (age 43) Taraz, Kazakh SSR, Soviet Union
- Height: 1.83 m (6 ft 0 in)
- Weight: 75 kg (165 lb)

Sport
- Sport: Boxing
- Weight class: Welterweight / Middleweight
Medal record
Olympic Games
Gold medal – first place	2004 Athens	Welterweight
World Amateur Championships
Bronze medal – third place	2005 Mianyang	Welterweight
Bronze medal – third place	2007 Chicago	Middleweight
Asian Games
Silver medal – second place	2006 Doha	Middleweight
Asian Championships
Silver medal – second place	2002 Seremban	Welterweight

Bakhtiyar Garifollauly Artayev (Kazakh: Бақтияр Ғарифоллаұлы Артаев, Baqtiiar Ğarifollaūly Artaev; born 14 March 1983) is a Kazakh amateur boxer who won the gold medal for Kazakhstan at the 2004 Summer Olympics. He was also the winner of the Val Barker Trophy for the outstanding boxer of the 2004 Olympics. In recognition of his success, one of the Taraz sport centres was named after him. In 2012 he was appointed as a president of the Astana Presidential Sports Club.

== Biography ==
Bakhtiyar Artayev was born in 1983 to a Muslim family in the city of Taraz, Kazakhstan. He is the son of Qaribullah (Karipulla) Artayev. Bakhtiyar won his first competition, a regional children's tournament, trained by Nurlan Akurpekov, who still coaches him today. Before the 2004 Summer Olympics, he tended to play second fiddle in the Kazakhstan boxing team, fighting only in Kazakhstan amateur tournaments. Nevertheless, he participated in 2003 World Amateur Boxing Championships, where he lost in the quarterfinals.

Before the 2004 Summer Olympics he had not been considered a favourite in the welterweight division. He qualified for the Athens Games by winning the 2nd AIBA Asian 2004 Olympic Qualifying Tournament in Karachi, Pakistan. In the final he defeated Iran's S Karimi Ahmedabad. Surprisingly, in Athens he easily advanced into semi-finals where he defeated the two-time Olympic champion Oleg Saitov from Russia. In the final, Bakhtiyar defeated Cuban boxer Lorenzo Aragon, who had not lost a bout for a year and a half.

Artayev won the bronze medal at the 2005 World Amateur Boxing Championships in Mianyang, China and went up to middleweight.

Artayev's results are as follows:

2004 Summer Olympics:

- Round of 32: Defeated Willy Bertrand Tankeu (Cameroon) Wipeout points stoppage
- Round of 16: Defeated Aliasker Bashirov (Turkmenistan) 33–23
- Quarterfinals: Defeated Viktor Polyakov (Ukraine) RSC-3 (0:50)
- Semifinals: Defeated Oleg Saitov (Russia) 20–18
- Gold Medal Match: Defeated Lorenzo Aragon Armenteros (Cuba) 36–26

2007 World Championship:

- Round of 64: Defeated Nakani Giorgi RSCI R2 (1:43)
- Round of 32: Defeated CHO Deok-Jin RSC R4 (0:55)
- Round of 16: Defeated Prasathinphimai Suriya 20:7
- Quarterfinals: Defeated Said Rachidi 19:11
- Semifinals: Lost to Alfonso Blanco 7:15

2008 Summer Olympics:

- Round of 32: Defeated Said Rachidi 8:2
- Round of 16: Defeated Matvey Korobov 10:7
- Quarterfinals: Lost to James Degale 3:8

== Career ==
Since June 2009 – Director of the Bakhtiyar Artayev Boxing Palace in his native Taraz. In July 2009, he was appointed akim of Aishabibinsky rural district of Zhambyl district.

Since 23 November 2009 – Head of the Department of Tourism, Physical Culture and Sports of Jambyl Region. Since 24 December 2012 – President of the Presidential Professional Sports Club "Astana".

3 November 2013 – was a commentator during the Golovkin–Stevens fight on the KAZsport TV channel. On 14 November 2013, he joined the WSB commission.

In 2014, he went to study in London, lived there for 1.5 years. Since 2016 – Director of Tarlan Batyrlary LLP.

On 19 March 2017, he was an expert during the reporting of the Golovkin—Jacobs duel, together with Serik Sapiev. In February 2018, he was appointed general manager of the semi-professional boxing club "Astana Arlans".

In June 2021, Bakhtiar Artayev received the position of the state boxing coach of Kazakhstan. On 11 February 2022, Bakhtiar Artayev resigned from the post of Vice President and state coach of the Boxing Federation of Kazakhstan, after supporting Arman Dzhumageldiyev, known as Wild Arman.
