= Oleg Saitov =

Russian boxer

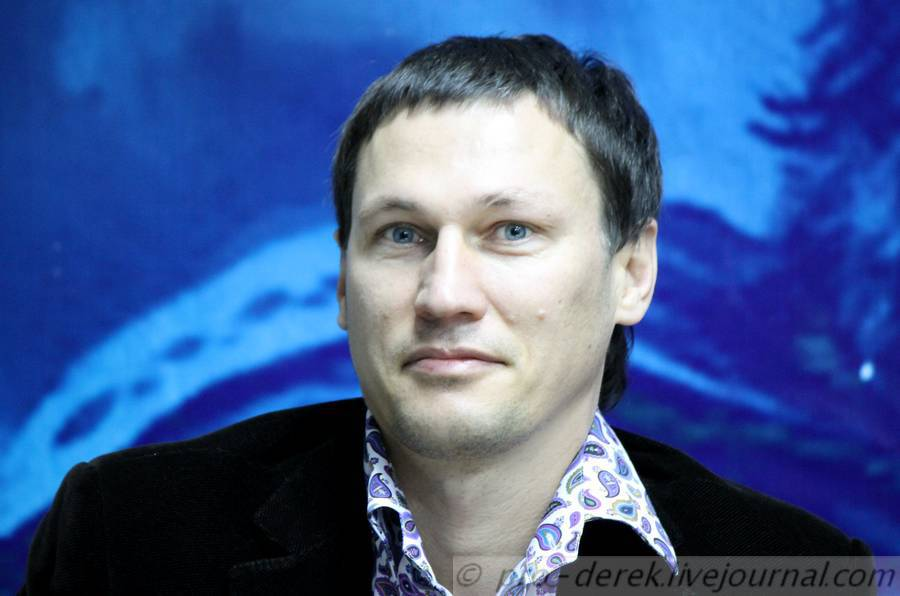
- Saitov in 2012

Personal information
- Full name: Олег Элекпаевич Саитов
- Nationality: Russia
- Born: 26 May 1974 (age 52) Novokuybyshevsk, Samara Oblast, Russian SFSR, Soviet Union
- Height: 1.78 m (5 ft 10 in)
- Weight: 69 kg (152 lb)

Sport
- Sport: Boxing
- Weight class: Welterweight
- Club: Trade Union Sports Club, Zhigulevsk
Medal record
Men's boxing
Representing Russia
Olympic Games
Gold medal – first place	1996 Atlanta	Welterweight
Gold medal – first place	2000 Sydney	Welterweight
Bronze medal – third place	2004 Athens	Welterweight
World Amateur Championships
Gold medal – first place	1997 Budapest	Welterweight
Silver medal – second place	1995 Berlin	Welterweight
Bronze medal – third place	1993 Tampere	Light Welterweight
European Amateur Championships
Gold medal – first place	1998 Minsk	Welterweight
Gold medal – first place	2004 Pula	Welterweight
Bronze medal – third place	1996 Vejle	Welterweight

Oleg Elekpayevich Saitov (Russian: Оле́г Элекпа́евич Саи́тов; (born 26 May 1974) is a Russian former Olympic boxer.

He was born on May 26, 1974, in Novokuybyshevsk, Russian SFSR to a Volga Tatar father and ethnic Russian mother. He has older brother Vadim.

In 1992 he represented the CIS team at the junior tournament in Scotland in the category up to 63.5 kilograms.

He won the Olympic gold medal at the 1996 and 2000 Summer Olympics in the welterweight division, and a bronze medal at the 2004 Olympics. Saitov was the winner of the Val Barker Trophy for Outstanding Boxer at the 2000 Olympic Games. In 2004, he won the title at the 2004 European Amateur Boxing Championships in Pula, Croatia. Saitov also won gold in his weight category at the 1997 World Amateur Championships and 1998 European Championships.

== Olympic results ==
1996 Olympic Results

- Round of 32:Defeated Cahit Süme of Turkey - PTS (11–1)
- Round of 16:Defeated Ho-Jo Bae of South Korea -PTS (9–5)
- Quarterfinal:Defeated Kamel Chater of Tunisia - PTS (9–3)
- Semifinal:Defeated Daniel Santos of Puerto Rico - PTS (13–11)
- Final:Defeated Juan Hernandez Sierra of Cuba - PTS (14–9)

2000 Olympic Results

- Round of 16:Defeated Francisco Calderon of Colombia - PTS (15–1)
- Quarterfinal:Defeated Ruslan Khairov of Azerbaijan - PTS (10-10; 55–47)
- Semifinal:Defeated Dorel Simion of Romania - PTS (19–10)
- Final:Defeated Serhiy Dotsenko of Ukraine- PTS (24–16)

2004 Olympic Results

- Round of 32:Defeated Ait Hammi Miloud of Morocco - PTS (30–15)
- Round of 16:Defeated Mohamed Hikal of Egypt - PTS (18–17)
- Quarterfinal:Defeated Sherzod Husanov of Uzbekistan - PTS (22–14)
- Semifinal:Lost to Bakhtiyar Artayev of Kazakhstan - PTS (18–20)
