= Xavier Noël =

French boxer (born 1976)

Personal information
- Full name: Xavier Noël
- Nationality: France
- Born: July 11, 1976 (age 49) Les Abymes, Pointe-à-Pitre
- Height: 1.83 m (6 ft 0 in)
- Weight: 69 kg (152 lb)

Sport
- Sport: Boxing
- Weight class: Welterweight
- Club: VGA, Saint-Maur-des-Fossés
Medal record
European Amateur Championships
| Silver medal – second place | 2004 Pula | Welterweight |
EU Amateur Championships
| Silver medal – second place | 2003 Strasbourg | Welterweight |
| Silver medal – second place | 2007 Dublin | Welterweight |
Mediterranean Games
| Gold medal – first place | 2001 Tunis | Welterweight |
| Silver medal – second place | 2005 Almeíra | Welterweight |

Xavier Noel (born July 11, 1976, in Les Abymes, Pointe-à-Pitre, Guadeloupe) is a French welterweight amateur boxer who won silver at the 2004 European Championships and participated in the 2004 Summer Olympics.

== Career ==
At the European Championships he lost the final to Olympic gold medalist Oleg Saitov. At the Olympics he beat Andre Berto, and then lost to Ukrainian Viktor Polyakov. At the 2007 World Championships he was beaten early by Bakhyt Sarsekbayev.
