= Dorel Simion =

Romanian boxer

Medal record

Representing Romania

Men's Boxing

Olympic Games
Bronze medal – third place	2000 Sydney	Welterweight

World Amateur Championships
Gold medal – first place	1997 Budapest	Light Welterweight

European Amateur Championships
Gold medal – first place	1998 Minsk	Light Welterweight

Dorel Simion (born 13 February 1977 in București) is a Romanian boxer. Simion won the Welterweight bronze medal at the 2000 Summer Olympics. He also won gold at the 1997 World Championships and 1998 European Championships.

== Personal ==
Simion is the younger brother of Olympian Marian Simion. Their family is of Romani descent.

== Amateur career ==
His Olympic results were:

- Defeated Ruben Fuchu (Puerto Rico) RSCO 3
- Defeated Roberto Guerra (Cuba) 11–7
- Defeated Steven Kuchler (Germany) 26–14
- Lost to Oleg Saitov (Russia) 19–10
