= Leonard Bundu =

Sierra Leonean boxer (born 1974)

Personal information
- Nickname: The Lion
- Nationality: Italian
- Born: 21 November 1974 (age 51) Freetown, Sierra Leone
- Height: 1.69 m (5 ft 7 in)
- Weight: Welterweight

Boxing career
- Reach: 174 cm (69 in)
- Stance: Orthodox

Boxing record
- Total fights: 37
- Wins: 33
- Win by KO: 12
- Losses: 2
- Draws: 2
Medal record
Men's amateur boxing
Representing Italy
Mediterranean Games
Gold medal – first place	1997 Bari	Light-welterweight
World Championships
Bronze medal – third place	1999 Houston	Welterweight
Representing Sierra Leone
Olympic Qualifiers (Africa)
Bronze medal – third place	2004 Gaborone	Welterweight

Leonard Bundu (born 21 November 1974) is a Sierra Leone-born Italian former professional boxer who competed from 2005 to 2016. He held multiple regional welterweight championships, including the European title twice between 2011 and 2016; the European Union title from 2009 to 2010; the Commonwealth title in 2014; and challenged once for the WBA interim welterweight title in 2014. As an amateur, Bundu won a gold medal in the light-welterweight division at the 1997 Mediterranean Games; welterweight bronze at the 1999 World Championships; and represented Italy at the 2000 Olympics, where he reached the second round of the welterweight bracket.

== Amateur career ==
Bundu won his first major amateur medal at the 1997 Mediterranean Games in Bari, winning gold in the light-welterweight division. This was followed up with bronze at the 1999 World Championships in Houston. At the 2000 Olympics in Sydney, Bundu fought in the welterweight division, losing to Daniyar Munaytbasov in the second round. Bundu also represented his native Sierra Leone at the 2nd AIBA African 2004 Olympic Qualifying Tournament in Gaborone, where he won bronze in welterweight division.

== Professional career ==
On 1 April 2005, Bundu won in his professional debut with a first-round knockout against Peter Gaspar. He would spend the next nine years fighting almost exclusively in his adoptive Italy, save for one outing in Germany. During this time Bundu would pick up many regional championships, including the vacant European Union welterweight title on 13 March 2009, in a unanimous decision (UD) over Frank Haroche Horta.

=== Bundu vs. Petrucci ===
This was bettered on 4 November 2011, when Bundu won the full European welterweight title in a rematch against Daniele Petrucci; their first fight for the vacant title, on 25 June 2011, ended in an eighth-round majority technical draw.

=== Bundu vs. Gavin ===
Bundu defended his European title six times, as well as winning the Commonwealth title against undefeated contender and decorated amateur Frankie Gavin. In their fight, on 1 August 2014, Bundu scored a surprise sixth-round knockdown with a hard body shot, and would go on to win by split decision.

=== Bundu vs. Thurman ===
Later in the year, on 13 December, Bundu challenged unsuccessfully for his first major world championship in his first visit to the United States. Defending WBA interim titlist Keith Thurman, also an undefeated prospect at the time, knocked Bundu down in the first round, but Bundu showed his durability by going the full twelve-round distance with the feared puncher. In doing so, Bundu suffered his first professional loss via UD.

=== Bundu vs. Koivula ===
On 22 April 2016, Bundu won the vacant European welterweight title for a second time by stopping Jussi Koivula in nine rounds.

=== Bundu vs. Spence Jr ===
Later that year, on 21 August, Bundu travelled to the US for a third time to face Errol Spence Jr., another undefeated prospect, in what was an eliminator for the IBF welterweight title. The first three rounds were fast-paced and competitive, with Bundu utilising his pressure fighting style and feints, although his punch output would slow in the fourth as Spence began using consistent combinations and lateral movement. In round six, Bundu was floored by a hard uppercut, but this was incorrectly deemed a push by the referee. Seconds later, Spence landed an uppercut–hook combination which left Bundu slumped on the canvas unconscious, in his first knockout loss. He was also stripped of his European welterweight title.

== Professional boxing record ==
37 fights	33 wins	2 losses
By knockout	12	1
By decision	21	1
Draws	2	

No.	Result	Record	Opponent	Type	Round, time	Date	Location	Notes
37	Loss	33–2–2	Errol Spence Jr.	KO	6 (12), 2:06	21 Aug 2016	Ford Amphitheater at Coney Island, New York City, New York, US	
36	Win	33–1–2	Jussi Koivula	TKO	9 (12), 2:40	22 Apr 2016	Nelson Mandela Forum, Florence, Italy	Won vacant European welterweight title
35	Win	32–1–2	Pablo Munguia	UD	8	26 Jun 2015	Little Creek Casino Resort, Shelton, Washington, US	
34	Loss	31–1–2	Keith Thurman	UD	12	13 Dec 2014	MGM Grand Garden Arena, Paradise, Nevada, US	For WBA interim welterweight title
33	Win	31–0–2	Frankie Gavin	SD	12	1 Aug 2014	Civic Hall, Wolverhampton, England	Retained European welterweight title; Won Commonwealth welterweight title
32	Win	30–0–2	Lee Purdy	TKO	12 (12), 2:53	14 Dec 2013	ExCeL, London, England	Retained European welterweight title
31	Win	29–0–2	Rafał Jackiewicz	KO	11 (12)	6 Apr 2013	Teatro Tendastrisce, Rome, Italy	Retained European welterweight title
30	Win	28–0–2	Ismael El Massoudi	KO	1 (12), 2:40	1 Dec 2012	Palazzetto dello Sport, Rezzato, Italy	Retained European welterweight title
29	Win	27–0–2	Stefano Castellucci	TD	5 (12), 2:55	14 Jul 2012	Palasport Primo Carnera, Udine, Italy	Retained European welterweight title; Unanimous TD: Bundu cut from an accidental head clash
28	Win	26–0–2	Antonio Moscatiello	KO	5 (12), 2:05	23 Mar 2012	Palasport EIB Fiera, Brescia, Italy	Retained European welterweight title
27	Win	25–0–2	Daniele Petrucci	UD	12	4 Nov 2011	Nelson Mandela Forum, Florence, Italy	Won vacant European welterweight title
26	Draw	24–0–2	Daniele Petrucci	TD	8 (12)	25 Jun 2011	Foro Italico, Rome, Italy	For vacant European welterweight title; Majority TD: Bundu sustained eye swelling from an accidental head clash
25	Win	24–0–1	Zoran Cvek	PTS	6	25 Feb 2011	Palazzetto dello Sport "Mario Mattioli", Florence, Italy	
24	Win	23–0–1	Moises Castro	KO	1 (6)	26 Nov 2010	Palazzetto dello Sport, Rezzato, Italy	
23	Win	22–0–1	Ronny McField	TD	6 (6)	21 May 2010	Centro Sportivo San Filippo, Brescia, Italy	Unanimous TD: Bundu cut from an accidental head clash
22	Win	21–0–1	Carlos Adán Jerez	TD	5 (12)	19 Mar 2010	Nelson Mandela Forum, Florence, Italy	Won vacant WBA Inter-Continental welterweight title; Unanimous TD: Jerez cut from an accidental head clash
21	Win	20–0–1	Ronny McField	TD	7 (8)	18 Dec 2009	PalaBianchini, Latina, Italy	Unanimous TD: Bundu cut from an accidental head clash
20	Win	19–0–1	Frank Shabani	UD	12	27 Jun 2009	Max-Schmeling-Halle, Berlin, Germany	Retained European Union welterweight title
19	Win	18–0–1	Frank Haroche Horta	UD	12	13 Mar 2009	Nelson Mandela Forum, Florence, Italy	Won vacant European Union welterweight title
18	Win	17–0–1	Johannes Fabrizius	PTS	6	21 Nov 2008	Palazzetto dello Sport, Nuvolera, Italy	
17	Win	16–0–1	Laszlo Komjathi	TKO	5 (6)	24 Oct 2008	Podenzano, Italy	
16	Win	15–0–1	Patrik Hruska	PTS	6	28 Aug 2008	Lungolago Zanardelli, Toscolano-Maderno, Italy	
15	Win	14–0–1	Giammario Grassellini	TKO	1 (10)	4 Mar 2008	Nelson Mandela Forum, Florence, Italy	
14	Win	13–0–1	Gheorghe Danut	PTS	8	12 Dec 2007	Rezzato, Italy	
13	Win	12–0–1	Vincenzo Finzi	TKO	1 (12), 2:40	24 Aug 2007	Lungolago Zanardelli, Toscolano-Maderno, Italy	Retained IBF Mediterranean welterweight title
12	Draw	11–0–1	Luciano Abis	TD	3 (10), 0:37	15 Jun 2007	PalaLido, Milan, Italy	For vacant Italy welterweight title; Bundu cut from an accidental head clash
11	Win	11–0	Karim Netchaoui	TKO	11 (12)	2 Mar 2007	Nelson Mandela Forum, Florence, Italy	Won vacant IBF Mediterranean welterweight title
10	Win	10–0	Volodymyr Borovskyy	PTS	8	21 Oct 2006	Palazzetto dello Sport, Rome, Italy	
9	Win	9–0	Virgil Meleg	PTS	6	22 Sep 2006	Cortemaggiore, Italy	
8	Win	8–0	Attila Kiss	PTS	6	11 Aug 2006	Toscolano-Maderno, Italy	
7	Win	7–0	Vincenzo Finzi	PTS	6	12 May 2006	Rezzato, Italy	
6	Win	6–0	Mugurel Sebe	UD	8	3 Apr 2006	Rivarolo Canavese, Italy	
5	Win	5–0	Mārtiņš Kukulis	PTS	6	10 Feb 2006	Palazzetto dello Sport, Chiarbola, Trieste, Italy	
4	Win	4–0	Brett James	PTS	6	7 Aug 2005	Palasport Flaminio, Rimini, Italy	
3	Win	3–0	Antonio Taglialatela	TD	3 (6)	5 Jun 2005	Piazza della Loggia, Brescia, Italy	
2	Win	2–0	Ferenc Olah	KO	1 (6)	16 Apr 2005	PalaNorda, Bergamo, Italy	
1	Win	1–0	Peter Gaspar	KO	1 (6), 2:08	1 Apr 2005	Florence, Italy	

Sporting positions
Regional boxing titles
Vacant Title last held by Giammario Grassellini	IBF Mediterranean welterweight champion 2 March 2007 – 2008; Vacated	Vacant Title next held by Giuseppe Langella
Vacant Title last held by Daniele Petrucci	Italy welterweight champion 5 March 2008 – June 2008; Vacated	Vacant Title next held by Nicola Conti
Vacant Title last held by Daniele Petrucci	European Union welterweight champion 13 March 2009 – 2010; Vacated	Vacant Title next held by Luciano Abis
Vacant Title last held by Stefano Castellucci	WBA Inter-Continental welterweight champion 19 March 2010 – 2011; Vacated	Vacant Title next held by Kell Brook
Vacant Title last held by Matthew Hatton	European welterweight champion 4 November 2011 – November 2014; Vacated	Vacant Title next held by Gianluca Branco
Vacant Title last held by Frankie Gavin	Commonwealth welterweight champion 1 August 2014 – November 2014; Vacated	Vacant Title next held by Frankie Gavin
Vacant Title last held by Gianluca Branco	European welterweight champion 22 April 2016 – 21 August 2016; Stripped	Vacant Title next held by Ceferino Rodriguez
