= Colombia at the 2000 Summer Olympics =

- IOC code: COL
- NOC: Colombian Olympic Committee
- Website: www.olimpicocol.co (in Spanish)

in Sydney
- Competitors: 44 (25 men and 19 women) in 13 sports
- Flag bearer: María Isabel Urrutia
- Medals Ranked 50th: Gold 1 Silver 0 Bronze 0 Total 1

Summer Olympics appearances (overview)
- 1932; 1936; 1948; 1952; 1956; 1960; 1964; 1968; 1972; 1976; 1980; 1984; 1988; 1992; 1996; 2000; 2004; 2008; 2012; 2016; 2020; 2024

Colombia competed at the 2000 Summer Olympics in Sydney, Australia. Colombia won its first ever gold medal at these Olympic games. 44 competitors, 25 men and 19 women, took part in 45 events in 13 sports.

== Medalists ==
Medal	Name	Sport	Event	Date
Gold	María Isabel Urrutia	Weightlifting	Women's 75 kg	20 September

== Competitors ==
The following is the list of number of competitors in the Games.

Sport	Men	Women	Total
Athletics	3	8	11
Boxing	3	–	3
Cycling	7	2	9
Diving	1	1	2
Equestrian	1	0	1
Fencing	1	1	2
Shooting	2	1	3
Swimming	4	1	5
Taekwondo	1	0	1
Tennis	0	2	2
Triathlon	0	1	1
Weightlifting	1	2	3
Wrestling	1	–	1
Total	25	19	44

== Athletics ==
=== Men's Competition ===
Men's 200m

- Jimmy Pino
  - Round 1 – 21.42 (→ did not advance)

Men's High Jump

- Gilmar Mayo
  - Qualifying – 2.20 (→ did not advance)

Men's marathon

- José Alirio Carrasco
  - Final – did not finish (→ no ranking)

=== Women's Competition ===
Women's 200m

- Felipa Palacios
  - Round 1 – 23.08
  - Round 2 – 23.19
  - Semifinal – 23.11 (→ did not advance)

Women's 400m

- Norma González
  - Round 1 – 53.34 (→ did not advance)

Women's 4 × 100 m

- Mirtha Brock, Digna Luz Murillo, Melisa Murillo, Felipa Palacios, Ximena Restrepo
  - Round 1 – 44.08
  - Semifinal – 44.37 (→ did not advance)

Women's Javelin Throw

- Sabina Moya
  - Qualifying – 49.16 (→ did not advance)

Women's Marathon

- Iglandini González
  - Final – 2:47:26 (→ 40th place)

== Boxing ==
Men's Featherweight (– 57 kg)

- Andrés Ledesma
  - Round 1 – Lost to Somluck Kamsing of Thailand (→ did not advance)

Men's Lightweight (– 60 kg)

- José Leonardo Cruz
  - Round 1 – Defeated Giovanni Michael Frontin of Mauritius
  - Round 2 – Lost to Almazbek Raimkulov of Kyrgyzstan (→ did not advance)

Men's Welterweight (– 67 kg)

- Francisco Calderón
  - Round 1 – Bye
  - Round 2 – Lost to Oleg Saitov of Russia (→ did not advance)

== Cycling ==
=== Cross Country Mountain Bike ===
Men's Mountain Bike

- Diego Garavito
  - Final – did not finish (→ no ranking)

Women's Mountain Bike

- Flor Marina Delgadillo
  - Final – 2:03:17.10 (→ 24th place)

=== Road Cycling ===
Men's Individual Time Trial

- Víctor Hugo Peña
  - Final – 1:01:10 (→ 24th place)

Men's Road Race

- Ruber Marín
  - Final – 5:30:46 (→ 31st place)
- Santiago Botero
  - Final – did not finish (→ no ranking)
- Jhon García
  - Final – did not finish (→ no ranking)
- Fredy Gonzalez
  - Final – did not finish (→ no ranking)
- Víctor Hugo Peña
  - Final – did not finish (→ no ranking)

=== Track Cycling ===
==== Men's Competition ====
Men's Point Race

- Marlon Pérez
  - Points – 0
  - Laps Down – 2 (→ 21st place)

==== Women's Competition ====
Women's Individual Pursuit

- María Luisa Calle
  - Qualifying – 03:44.395 (→ did not advance)

Women's Point Race

- María Luisa Calle
  - Points – 2 (→ 11th place)

== Diving ==
Men's 3 Metre Springboard

- Juan Urán
  - Preliminary – 308.1 (→ did not advance, 41st place)

Men's 10 Metre Platform

- Juan Urán
  - Preliminary – 333.93 (→ did not advance, 27th place)

Women's 3 Metre Springboard

- Diana Pineda
  - Preliminary – 220.68 (→ did not advance, 34th place)

== Fencing ==
Two fencers, one man and one woman, represented Colombia in 2000.

Men's épée

- Mauricio Rivas

Women's épée

- Ángela María Espinosa

== Swimming ==
Men's 50m Freestyle

- Camilo Becerra
  - Preliminary Heat – 23.63 (→ did not advance)

Men's 100m Freestyle

- Fernando Jácome
  - Preliminary Heat – 52.24 (→ did not advance)

Men's 200m Freestyle

- Fernando Jácome
  - Preliminary Heat – 1:54.17 (→ did not advance)

Men's 100m Backstroke

- Germán Martínez
  - Preliminary Heat – 59.94 (→ did not advance)

Men's 200m Backstroke

- Alejandro Bermúdez
  - Preliminary Heat – 02:03.43 (→ did not advance)

Men's 400m Individual Medley

- Alejandro Bermúdez
  - Preliminary Heat – 04:29.42 (→ did not advance)

Women's 100m Breaststroke

- Isabel Ceballos
  - Preliminary Heat – 01:11.90 (→ did not advance)

Women's 200m Breaststroke

- Isabel Ceballos
  - Preliminary Heat – 02:34.09 (→ did not advance)

== Triathlon ==
Women's Competition:

- Maria Morales – 2:13:43.38 (→ 37th place)

== Weightlifting ==
Men

Athlete	Event	Snatch			Clean & Jerk			Total	Rank
Athlete	Event	1	2	3	1	2	3	Total	Rank
Nelson Castro	– 56 kg	110.0	115.0	~~117.5~~	140.0	~~145.0~~	145.0	260.0	11

Women

Athlete	Event	Snatch			Clean & Jerk			Total	Rank
Athlete	Event	1	2	3	1	2	3	Total	Rank
María Isabel Urrutia	– 75 kg	105.0	~~110.0~~	110.0	132.5	135.0	~~137.5~~	245.0	1st place, gold medalist(s)
Carmenza Delgado	+ 75 kg	110.0	~~115.0~~	115.0	140.0	145.0	~~147.5~~	260.0	4

== See also ==
- Sports in Colombia
- Colombia at the 1999 Pan American Games

== Notes ==
- Wallechinsky, David (2004). The Complete Book of the Summer Olympics (Athens 2004 Edition). Toronto, Canada. ISBN 1-894963-32-6.
- International Olympic Committee (2001). The Results. Retrieved 12 November 2005.
- Sydney Organising Committee for the Olympic Games (2001). Official Report of the XXVII Olympiad Volume 1: Preparing for the Games. Retrieved 20 November 2005.
- Sydney Organising Committee for the Olympic Games (2001). Official Report of the XXVII Olympiad Volume 2: Celebrating the Games. Retrieved 20 November 2005.
- Sydney Organising Committee for the Olympic Games (2001). The Results. Retrieved 20 November 2005.
- International Olympic Committee Web Site
