= Yovanny =

Yovanny is a given name. Notable people with this name include:

- Yovanny Arrechea (born 1983) American-Columbian footballer
- Yovanny Lara (born 1975) Dominican baseball pitcher
- Yovanny Lorenzo (born 1980) Dominican boxer
- Yovanny Polanco (born 1974) Dominican merengue singer
