= Serhiy Dotsenko =

Ukrainian boxer

Personal information
- Nationality: Russian
- Born: 29 July 1979 (age 46) Simferopol, Ukrainian SSR, Soviet Union
- Height: 5 ft 8.5 in (174 cm)
- Weight: Welterweight

Boxing career

Boxing record
- Total fights: 3
- Wins: 3
- Win by KO: 2
- Losses: 0
Medal record
Men's amateur boxing
Representing Ukraine
Olympic Games
Silver medal – second place	2000 Sydney	Welterweight

Serhiy Dotsenko (Ukrainian: Сергій Доценко; born July 27, 1979, in Simferopol, Ukrainian SSR, Soviet Union) is a Russian former professional boxer who competed during 2001. As an amateur, Dotesenko represented Ukraine at the 2000 Summer Olympics and won the silver medal in the welterweight bracket, losing in the final 16–24 to Russia's Oleg Saitov.

== Olympic results ==
- Defeated Guillermo Saputo (Argentina) 12–7
- Defeated Parkpoom Jangphonak (Thailand) 13–5
- Defeated Daniyar Munaytbasov (Kazakhstan) 8–7
- Defeated Vitalie Gruşac (Moldova) 17–8
- Lost to Oleg Saitov (Russia) 16–24

== Pro career ==
Dotsenko began his professional career a year later and won his only three pro bouts, retiring in the same year in which he turned pro.

== Professional boxing record ==
3 fights	3 wins	0 losses
By knockout	2	0
By decision	1	0

No.	Result	Record	Opponent	Type	Round, time	Date	Location	Notes
3	Win	3–0	Volodymyr Rubaylo	PTS	10	30 Apr 2001	Circus, Kyiv, Ukraine	Won vacant Ukraine welterweight title
2	Win	2–0	Patrick Puskas	KO	1 (6)	24 Mar 2001	Bordelandhalle, Magdeburg, Germany	
1	Win	1–0	Milan Vrsecky	TKO	2 (4)	2 Mar 2001	Warsaw, Poland	Professional debut

Sporting positions
Regional boxing titles
New title	Ukraine welterweight champion 30 Apr 2001 – 2001; Retired	Vacant Title next held by Valeriy Brazhnyk
