= Dante Craig =

American boxer

Personal information
- Full name: Dante Mario Craig
- Born: August 20, 1978 (age 47) Cincinnati, Ohio, U.S.

Sport
- Country: United States
- Sport: Boxing

Dante Mario Craig (born August 20, 1978) is an American former professional boxer who competed from 2001 to 2016. As an amateur, he competed at the 2000 Summer Olympics in Sydney, in the welterweight. Craig was born in Cincinnati, Ohio. He took up boxing at the age of 12 to defend himself against an older bully, and won a National Junior Olympic championship by age 15.
