= Lynden Hosking =

Australian boxer

Personal information
- Nationality: Australian
- Born: 29 June 1973 (age 53) Birchip, Victoria, Australia

Sport
- Sport: Boxing
Medal record
Boxing
Commonwealth Games
Bronze medal – third place	1998 Kuala Lumpur	Men's 67 kg

Lynden Hosking (born 29 June 1973) is an Australian former boxer. He competed in the men's welterweight event at the 1996 Summer Olympics.
