= Jussi Koivula =

Finnish boxer (born 1983)

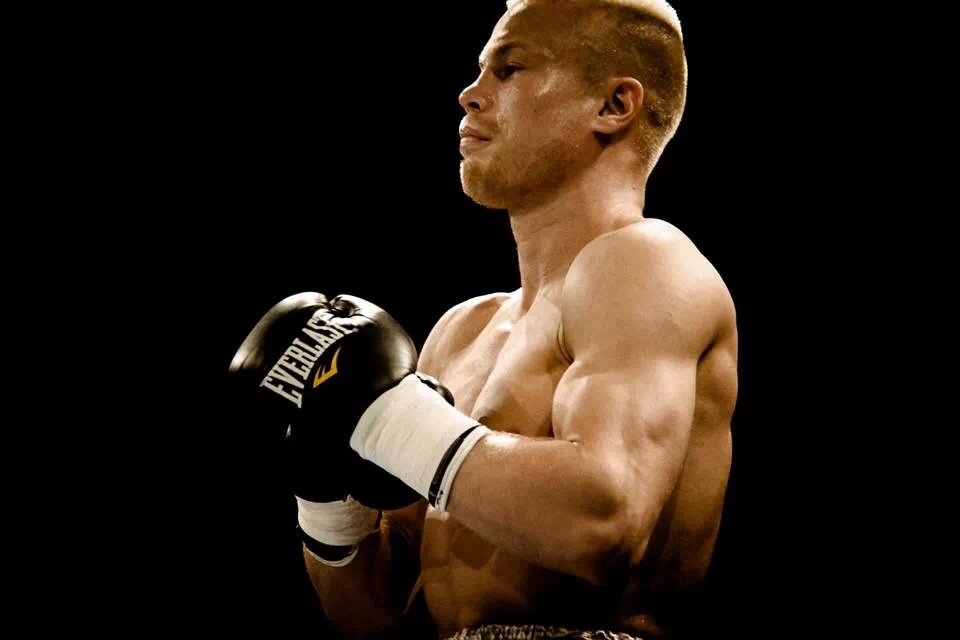
- Koivula in 2013

Personal information
- Nickname: Iceman
- Nationality: Finnish
- Born: 24 December 1983 (age 42) Hämeenlinna, Tavastia, Finland
- Height: 1.77 m (5 ft 10 in)
- Weight: Welterweight; Light-middleweight

Boxing career
- Stance: Orthodox

Boxing record
- Total fights: 33
- Wins: 24
- Win by KO: 9
- Losses: 8
- Draws: 1

Jussi Koivula (born 24 December 1983) is a Finnish professional boxer who has challenged twice for the European welterweight title in 2016 and 2017.

== Professional career ==
Koivula made his professional debut on 30 August 2008, scoring a third-round stoppage over Tibor Rafael. He would fight exclusively in Finland for the next six years, remaining undefeated until 20 April 2013, when Łukasz Maciec stopped him in five rounds. On 7 February 2015, Koivula fought away from home for the first time in an attempt to win the vacant IBF Inter-Continental junior-middleweight title, but lost a unanimous decision to Marcello Matano in Italy. Another visit to Italy, on 22 April 2016, saw Koivula challenge unsuccessfully for the vacant European welterweight title, being stopped in nine rounds by Leonard Bundu.

== Professional boxing record ==
33 fights	24 wins	8 losses
By knockout	9	4
By decision	14	4
By disqualification	1	0
Draws	1	

No.	Result	Record	Opponent	Type	Round, time	Date	Location	Notes
33	Loss	24–8–1	Sergio Martínez	TKO	9 (10)	19 Dec 2020	Bolera Severino Prieto, Torrelavega, Spain	
32	Loss	24–7–1	Conor Benn	TKO	2 (10), 2:00	21 Jun 2019	York Hall, London, England	For WBA Continental (Europe) welterweight title
31	Loss	24–6–1	Jordy Weiss	UD	12	26 Apr 2019	Salle Polyvalente, Laval, France	For European Union welterweight title
30	Win	24–5–1	Alisher Ashurov	PTS	4	12 Jul 2018	Kauppatori, Mikkeli, Finland	
29	Loss	23–5–1	Samuel Vargas	SD	10	11 Nov 2017	Powerade Centre, Brampton, Ontario, Canada	For NABA welterweight title
28	Win	23–4–1	Pal Olah	DQ	3 (6), 2:46	26 Aug 2017	Olavinlinna, Savonlinna, Finland	
27	Win	22–4–1	Nerdin Fejzovic	TKO	4 (6), 1:31	6 May 2017	Gatorade Center, Turku, Finland	
26	Loss	21–4–1	Mohamed Mimoune	UD	12	31 Mar 2017	Institut National du Judo, Paris, France	For European Union welterweight title
25	Win	21–3–1	Gyorgy Varga	TKO	3 (6)	9 Jun 2016	Lauri Gym, Békéscsaba, Hungary	
24	Win	20–3–1	Srecko Janjic	PTS	4	21 May 2016	Ringside Gym, Helsinki, Finland	
23	Loss	19–3–1	Leonard Bundu	TKO	9 (12), 2:40	22 Apr 2016	Nelson Mandela Forum, Florence, Italy	For vacant European welterweight title
22	Loss	19–2–1	Zoran Didanovic	TKO	3 (4), 2:30	21 Nov 2015	Töölö Sports Hall, Helsinki, Finland	
21	Draw	18–2–1	Artem Karasev	SD	6	8 Aug 2015	Savonlinna, Finland	
20	Win	18–2	Michael Obin	UD	6	13 Jun 2015	Vaasa Arena, Vaasa, Finland	
19	Loss	17–2	Marcello Matano	UD	12	7 Feb 2015	Pala Hilton Pharma, Ferrara, Italy	For vacant IBF Inter-Continental junior-middleweight title
18	Win	17–1	Stiliyan Kostov	TKO	9 (10), 2:24	16 Aug 2014	Olavinlinna Opera Stage, Savonlinna, Finland	
17	Win	16–1	Ramazi Gogichashvili	TKO	3 (8), 2:04	9 May 2014	Urheilutalo, Helsinki, Finland	
16	Win	15–1	Hassan Ait Bassou	UD	10	7 Dec 2013	Barona Areena, Espoo, Finland	
15	Win	14–1	Lukasz Janik	KO	6 (8), 1:16	17 Aug 2013	Olavinlinna, Savonlinna, Finland	
14	Loss	13–1	Łukasz Maciec	TKO	5 (10)	20 Apr 2013	Pyynikin Palloiluhalli, Tampere, Finland	
13	Win	13–0	Arvydas Trizno	UD	6	16 Feb 2013	Ruissalon liikunta- ja uimahalli, Hamina, Finland	
12	Win	12–0	Giorgi Ungiadze	UD	8	15 Sep 2012	Seinäjoki Areena, Seinäjoki, Finland	
11	Win	11–0	Jarkko Jussila	UD	8	21 Jan 2012	Seinäjoki Areena, Seinäjoki, Finland	
10	Win	10–0	Jose Del Rio	UD	8	3 Dec 2011	Hartwall Arena, Helsinki, Finland	
9	Win	9–0	Kobe Vandekerkhove	UD	8	21 May 2011	Seinäjoki Areena, Seinäjoki, Finland	
8	Win	8–0	Konstantins Sakara	UD	6	4 Mar 2011	Hartwall Arena, Helsinki, Finland	
7	Win	7–0	Nuno Cruz	UD	8	27 Nov 2010	Hartwall Arena, Helsinki, Finland	
6	Win	6–0	Vatche Wartanian	UD	6	4 Sep 2010	Töölö Sports Hall, Helsinki, Finland	
5	Win	5–0	Leonti Vorontsuk	TKO	3 (6), 2:23	11 May 2010	Varuboden-areena, Kirkkonummi, Finland	
4	Win	4–0	Gabor Toti	TKO	2 (4), 1:41	27 Nov 2009	Pyynikin Palloiluhalli, Tampere, Finland	
3	Win	3–0	Adam Zadworny	UD	4	14 Feb 2009	Pyynikin Palloiluhalli, Tampere, Finland	
2	Win	2–0	Sergejs Volodins	UD	4	28 Nov 2008	Hartwall Arena, Helsinki, Finland	
1	Win	1–0	Tibor Rafael	TKO	3 (4), 0:19	30 Aug 2008	LänsiAuto Areena, Tampere, Finland	
