= Mosolesa Tsie =

Lesotho boxer (born 1980)

Personal information
- Born: 20 January 1980 (age 46) Maseru, Lesotho

Sport
- Sport: Boxing
Medal record
Representing Lesotho
Men's boxing
All-Africa Games
Bronze medal – third place	1999 Johannesburg	67 kg

Mosolesa Tsie (born 20 January 1980) is a Lesotho boxer. He competed in the men's welterweight event at the 2000 Summer Olympics.
