= Vadim Mezga =

Belarusian boxer (born 1974)

Personal information
- Nationality: Belarusian
- Born: 31 August 1974 (age 50); Mahilyow, Byelorussian SSR, USSR

Sport
- Sport: Boxing

Vadim Mezga (born 31 August 1974) is a Belarusian boxer. He competed in the men's welterweight event at the 1996 Summer Olympics.
