= 1994 Asian Amateur Boxing Championships =

Boxing competitions

1994 Asian Boxing Championships
- Host city: Tehran, Iran
- Dates: 14–21 January 1994
- Main venue: Shahid Afrasiabi Stadium

The 17th edition of the Men's Asian Amateur Boxing Championships was held from 14 to 21 January 1994 at Shahid Afrasiabi Stadium, Tehran, Iran.

== Medal summary ==
Event	Gold	Silver	Bronze
Light flyweight 48 kg	Bulat Zhumadilov; Kazakhstan	Muhammet Ramazanow; Turkmenistan	Huang Chih-kuo; Chinese Taipei
Light flyweight 48 kg	Bulat Zhumadilov; Kazakhstan	Muhammet Ramazanow; Turkmenistan	Pichit Phaisila; Thailand
Flyweight; 51 kg	Jeon In-duk; South Korea	Sultan Abdurazakov; Kazakhstan	Akbar Ahadi; Iran
Flyweight; 51 kg	Jeon In-duk; South Korea	Sultan Abdurazakov; Kazakhstan	Ali Muhammad Qambrani; Pakistan
Bantamweight; 54 kg	Bijan Batmani; Iran	Lim Jae-hwan; South Korea	Rinat Tanekov; Kazakhstan
Bantamweight; 54 kg	Bijan Batmani; Iran	Lim Jae-hwan; South Korea	Surapol Sankunrang; Thailand
Featherweight; 57 kg	Somluck Kamsing; Thailand	Nemo Bahari; Indonesia	Hsueh Yao-shun; Chinese Taipei
Featherweight; 57 kg	Somluck Kamsing; Thailand	Nemo Bahari; Indonesia	Nurlan Kalybayev; Kazakhstan
Lightweight; 60 kg	Chaleo Somwong; Thailand	Hussein Osman; Syria	Pejman Chalak; Iran
Lightweight; 60 kg	Chaleo Somwong; Thailand	Hussein Osman; Syria	Kim Seung-tae; South Korea
Light welterweight 63.5 kg	Bulat Niyazymbetov; Kazakhstan	Aswin Cabui; Indonesia	Bekmyrat Durdyýew; Turkmenistan
Light welterweight 63.5 kg	Bulat Niyazymbetov; Kazakhstan	Aswin Cabui; Indonesia	Kim Myung-hyun; South Korea
Welterweight; 67 kg	Nurzhan Smanov; Kazakhstan	Khampun Intasri; Thailand	Abdul Rasheed Baloch; Pakistan
Welterweight; 67 kg	Nurzhan Smanov; Kazakhstan	Khampun Intasri; Thailand	Khaled Al-Karad; Syria
Light middleweight 71 kg	Kanatbek Shagatayev; Kazakhstan	Asadollah Johari; Iran	Sawang Anunsri; Thailand
Light middleweight 71 kg	Kanatbek Shagatayev; Kazakhstan	Asadollah Johari; Iran	Gao Ming; China
Middleweight; 75 kg	Arkadiy Topayev; Kazakhstan	Lee Seung-bae; South Korea	Nurgeldi Kakaliýew; Turkmenistan
Middleweight; 75 kg	Arkadiy Topayev; Kazakhstan	Lee Seung-bae; South Korea	Rizwan Khan; Pakistan
Light heavyweight 81 kg	Ayoub Pourtaghi; Iran	Ko Young-sam; South Korea	Vassiliy Zhirov; Kazakhstan
Light heavyweight 81 kg	Ayoub Pourtaghi; Iran	Ko Young-sam; South Korea	Lakha Singh; India
Heavyweight; 91 kg	Jiang Tao; China	Morteza Shiri; Iran	Hossam Kourdi; Syria
Heavyweight; 91 kg	Jiang Tao; China	Morteza Shiri; Iran	Bahadir Sadikow; Turkmenistan
Super heavyweight +91 kg	Raj Kumar Sangwan; India	Iraj Kiarostami; Iran	An Jung-hyun; South Korea
Super heavyweight +91 kg	Raj Kumar Sangwan; India	Iraj Kiarostami; Iran	Mikhail Yurchenko; Kazakhstan

== Medal table ==
Rank	Nation	Gold	Silver	Bronze	Total
1	Kazakhstan	5	1	4	10
2	Iran	2	3	2	7
3	Thailand	2	1	3	6
4	South Korea	1	3	3	7
5	China	1	0	1	2
5	India	1	0	1	2
7	Indonesia	0	2	0	2
8	Turkmenistan	0	1	3	4
9	Syria	0	1	2	3
10	Pakistan	0	0	3	3
11	Chinese Taipei	0	0	2	2
Totals (11 entries)		12	12	24	48
