= Akbar Ahadi =

Iranian boxer and coach (born 1975)

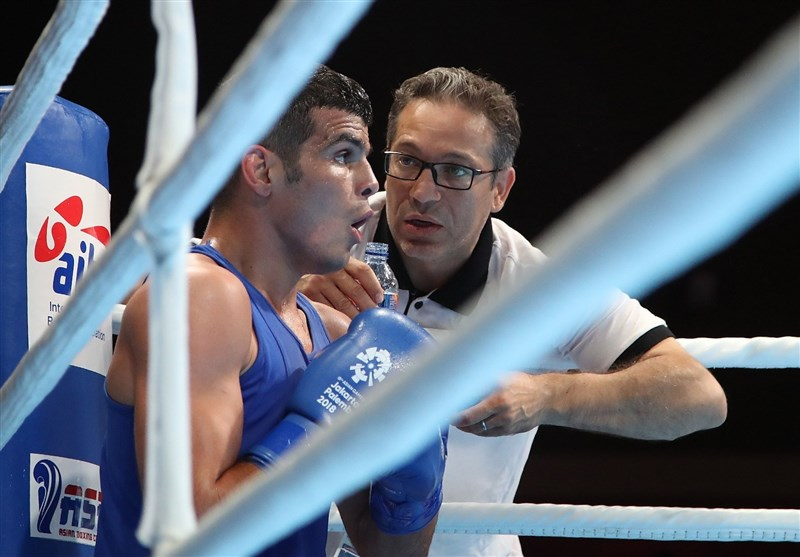
- Ahadi at the 2016 Olympics

Personal information
- Native name: اکبر احدی
- Nationality: Iranian
- Born: Akbar Ahadihir; May 24, 1975 (age 51) Tehran, Iran
- Education: MSc in University of Tehran
- Occupation: Coach
- Weight: Flyweight, Bantamweight

Sport
- Sport: Boxing
- Position: Iran's national team head coach
Medal record
Representing Iran
Asian Championships
Bronze medal – third place	1994 Tehran	51 kg
Silver medal – second place	1997 Kuala Lumpur	54 kg
West Asian Games
Gold medal – first place	1997 Tehran	54 kg

Akbar Ahadi (Persian: اکبر احدی, Standard Persian pronunciation: [ak.baɾ ahatiː]; born Akbar Ahadihir (Persian: اکبر احدی هیر); 24 May 1975 in Tehran) is an Iranian boxer and coach.

== Championships and awards ==
- Asian Championships
  - 1994 Asian Amateur Boxing Championships 51 kg (bronze)
  - 1997 Asian Amateur Boxing Championships 54 kg (silver)
- West Asian Games
  - 1997 West Asian Games 54 kg (gold)
- International tournaments
  - 1997 Thailand 21.King's Cup 54 kg (bronze)
  - 2002 Hungry Amateur Boxing 54 kg (silver)

== Coaching career ==
=== Summer Olympics ===
Ahadi coached of Ehsan Rouzbahani as Iran boxing national team head coach in the 2008 Summer Olympics.

=== World Championships ===
Ahadi coached Iran Boxing national team in 2012 AIBA Youth World Boxing Championships.

=== Asian Games ===
Ahadi coached Iran Boxing national team in 2018 Asian Games.

=== Asian Championships ===
Ahadi coached Iran boxing national team in 2022 Asian Youth & Junior Boxing Championships.

=== Coaching list ===
Position	Event	Team
Head coach	2005 Asian Amateur Boxing Championships	Iran
Head coach	2006 Asian Games	Iran
Head coach	2007 Asian Amateur Boxing Championships	Iran
Head coach	2008 Summer Olympics	Iran
Head coach	2010 Asian Games	Iran
Head coach	2012 AIBA Youth World Boxing Championships	Iran
Head coach	2014 Asian Games	Iran
Head coach	2018 Asian Games	Iran
Head coach	2022 Asian Youth & Junior Boxing Championships	Iran

== See also ==
- Iran national amateur boxing athletes
- Iran at the 1998 Asian Games
- 1994 Asian Amateur Boxing Championships
- 1997 Asian Amateur Boxing Championships
- Boxing at the 1998 Asian Games – Men's 54 kg
- Ehsan Rouzbahani
