= Hassan Mzonge =

Tanzanian boxer (born 1972)

Personal information
- Nationality: Tanzanian
- Born: 12 June 1972 (age 52)

Sport
- Sport: Boxing

Hassan Mzonge (born 12 June 1972) is a Tanzanian boxer. He competed in the men's welterweight event at the 1996 Summer Olympics.
