= Shane Heaps =

Tongan boxer

Personal information
- Full name: Robert Shane Heaps
- Nationality: American
- Born: April 28, 1971 (age 55) Orem, Utah, United States
- Height: 1.80 m (5 ft 11 in)
- Weight: 67 kg (148 lb)

Sport
- Sport: Boxing
- Weight class: Welterweight

Shane Robert Heaps (born April 28, 1971) is an American retired boxer and former Olympian. Heaps competed in the Welterweight category at the 1996 Summer Olympics, representing Tonga.

== Personal ==
Heaps currently resides in Park City, Utah, United States, where he teaches BoxFit boxing to both amateurs and professional fighters at AlpenFit.

== Amateur highlights ==
- 1996 Representing Tonga, Heaps competed Welterweight at the Atlanta Olympics. Results were:
  - Lost to Nurbek Kasenov (Kyrgyzstan) PTS (2–11)

== Olympic boxing record ==
1 Loss
Result	Record	Opponent	Type	Round	Date	Location	Notes
Loss	11-2	(Kyrgyzstan) Nurbek Kasenov	PTS	1	7/20/1996	(United States) Alexander Memorial Coliseum, Atlanta	1996 Summer Olympics, Welterweight.
