= Gerard O'Mahony =

Australian boxer (born 1979)

Gerard "Ged" Anthony O'Mahony (born 17 March 1979) is an Australian pro boxer best known for competing in the Olympics in 2004 and 2008 at Welterweight.

== Amateur ==
O'Mahony started boxing at an early age. He was trained by English born trainer Garry Hamilton.
In 2004, he qualified for the Athens Olympics but at the Games (results) lost his first bout to Ukrainian Viktor Polyakov.
In 2005, he beat Jarrod Fletcher on his way to the Australian title.
In 2006, he was beaten at welterweight by eventual southpaw winner Bongani Mwelase in the first round of the Commonwealth Games.
At the 2008 Olympics, he was named as the captain of the Australian boxing team, but was beaten in the opening round by Moldovan Vitalie Gruşac.
He was an Australian Institute of Sport scholarship holder.

== Pro ==
O'Mahony embarked on a pro career in 2009, so far compiling a record of 2-0.
