= Jesús Flores (boxer) =

Mexican boxer (born 1973)

Personal information
- Nationality: Mexican
- Born: 27 September 1973 (age 51)

Sport
- Sport: Boxing

Jesús Flores (born 27 September 1973) is a Mexican boxer. He competed in the men's welterweight event at the 1996 Summer Olympics.
