= Tengiz Meskhadze =

Georgian boxer

Personal information
- Nationality: Georgian
- Born: 8 February 1969 (age 56); Kutaisi, Georgian SSR, Soviet Union

Sport
- Sport: Boxing

Tengiz Meskhadze (born 8 February 1969) is a Georgian boxer. He competed in the men's welterweight event at the 1996 Summer Olympics.
