= Rolandas Jasevičius =

Lithuanian boxer (born 1982)

Personal information
- Full name: Rolandas Jasevičius
- Nationality: Lithuania
- Born: July 31, 1982 (age 43) Vilnius
- Height: 1.73 m (5 ft 8 in)
- Weight: 69 kg (152 lb)

Sport
- Sport: Boxing
- Weight class: Welterweight
- Club: Gintarine Pirstine, Vilnius
Medal record
European Amateur Championships
Bronze medal – third place	2004 Pula	Welterweight

Rolandas Jasevicius (born 31 July 1982) is a male boxer from Lithuania.

He participated in the 2004 Summer Olympics. There he was stopped in the first round of the welterweight (69 kg) division by Turkmenistan's Aliasker Bashirov.

Jasevicius won a bronze medal in the same division six months earlier, at the 2004 European Amateur Boxing Championships in Pula, Croatia.
