= József Nagy (boxer, born 1975) =

Hungarian boxer

Personal information
- Nationality: Hungarian
- Born: 28 June 1975 (age 49); Debrecen, Hungary

Sport
- Sport: Boxing

József Nagy (born 28 June 1975) is a Hungarian professional boxer who competed from 2003 to 2014 with a record of 31–15. At middleweight, he won the IBF International and interim WBA Inter-Continental titles. At super middleweight, he held the IBF Inter-continental title and as a cruiserweight he won the WBF (Foundation) title. As an amateur, he competed in the men's welterweight event at the 1996 Summer Olympics.
