= Bae Jin-seok =

South Korean boxer

Personal information
- Nationality: South Korean
- Born: 16 November 1978 (age 46)

Sport
- Sport: Boxing

Bae Jin-seok (born 16 November 1978) is a South Korean boxer. He competed in the men's welterweight event at the 2000 Summer Olympics.
