= Kabil Lahsen =

Moroccan boxer

Personal information
- Nationality: Moroccan
- Born: 31 December 1971 (age 53)

Sport
- Sport: Boxing

Kabil Lahsen (born 31 December 1971) is a Moroccan boxer. He competed in the men's welterweight event at the 1996 Summer Olympics.
