= Fadel Showban =

Egyptian boxer (born 1978)

Personal information
- Nationality: Egyptian
- Born: 23 May 1978 (age 47)

Sport
- Sport: Boxing

Fadel Showban (born 23 May 1978) is an Egyptian boxer. He competed in the men's welterweight event at the 2000 Summer Olympics.

He won a bronze medal in welterweight at the 1999 All-Africa Games.
