= Morteza Shiri =

Iranian boxer

Personal information
- Nationality: Iranian
- Born: 12 June 1962 (age 64) Tehran, Iran

Sport
- Sport: Boxing
Medal record
Asian Championships
Silver medal – second place	1994 Tehran	91 kg

Morteza Shiri (Persian: مرتضی شیری, born 12 June 1962) is an Iranian boxer. He competed in the men's heavyweight event at the 1992 Summer Olympics.
