= Tureano Johnson =

Bahamian boxer (born 1984)

Personal information
- Nationality: Bahamian
- Born: Taureano Dexter Johnson; 12 February 1984 (age 42) Nassau, Bahamas
- Height: 5 ft 10 in (178 cm)
- Weight: Middleweight

Boxing career
- Reach: 73 1/2 in (187 cm)
- Stance: Orthodox

Boxing record
- Total fights: 25
- Wins: 21
- Win by KO: 15
- Losses: 3
- Draws: 1

Taureano Dexter Johnson (variously known as Tureano, Toureano, Taureno, or Jhonson; born 12 February 1984) is a Bahamian professional boxer who held the WBC Silver middleweight title in 2015. As an amateur he qualified for the 2008 Olympics.

== Amateur career ==
At the PanAm Games 2007 he lost to Diego Chaves 6:9. He rose to prominence with his effort against PanAm Champion Pedro Lima at the first Olympic qualifier where he lost a close bout. At the second qualifier he won the rematch 10:6 and qualified. He trains in Cuba under the guidance of coach Jesus Yu.

== Professional career ==
=== Johnson vs Castaneda ===
On February 9, 2019, Johnson faced Fernando Castaneda. The fight ended in a draw, with two judges scoring it 77-75, one for Johnson, one for Castenda, while the third one scored it 76-76.

=== Johnson vs Quigley ===
In his next fight, Johnson fought Jason Quigley, ranked #5 by the WBC, #8 by the WBA and #14 by the IBF at middleweight. In a dominant performance, Johnson won the fight via ninth-round TKO.

=== Johnson vs Munguia ===
In his next bout, Johnson fought WBC and WBO #1 and IBF #9 contender Jaime Munguia. The fight started off competitively, until the sixth round when Munguia caught Johnson with a vicious uppercut that caused a serious cut on Johnson's upper lip. The doctor decided to stop the fight after the end of the round, and Munguia was awarded the win.

== Olympics results ==
2008 Summer Olympics - Welterweight division

- Defeated Rolande Moses (Grenada) - PTS (18-3)
- Defeated Olexandr Stretskyy (Ukraine) - PTS 9-4
- Lost to Kanat Islam (Kazakhstan) 4-14

== Professional boxing record ==
25 fights	21 wins	3 losses
By knockout	15	3
By decision	6	0
Draws	1	

No.	Result	Record	Opponent	Type	Round, time	Date	Location	Notes
25	Loss	21–3–1	(Mexico) Jaime Munguía	RTD	6 (12), 3:00	30 Oct 2020	(United States) Fantasy Springs Resort Casino, Indio, California, US	For WBO Inter-Continental middleweight title
24	Win	21–2–1	(Republic of Ireland) Jason Quigley	RTD	9 (10), 3:00	18 Jul 2019	(United States) Fantasy Springs Resort Casino, Indio, California, US	Won WBC-NABF middleweight title
23	Draw	20–2–1	(Mexico) Fernando Castañeda	SD	8	9 Feb 2019	(United States) Fantasy Springs Resort Casino, Indio, California, US	
22	Loss	20–2	(Ukraine) Sergiy Derevyanchenko	TKO	12 (12), 0:40	25 Aug 2017	(United States) Buffalo Run Casino, Miami, Oklahoma, US	
21	Win	20–1	(Brazil) Fabiano Soares	KO	2 (10), 2:38	23 Mar 2017	(United States) Fantasy Springs Resort Casino, Indio, California, US	
20	Win	19–1	(United Kingdom) Eamonn O'Kane	UD	12	17 Oct 2015	(United States) Madison Square Garden, New York, New York, US	
19	Win	18–1	(Colombia) Alex Theran	RTD	5 (10), 3:00	9 Jan 2015	(United States) Madison Square Garden Theater, New York City, New York, US	Won vacant WBC Silver, and WBA International middleweight title
18	Win	17–1	(Ecuador) Humberto Toledo	TKO	6 (6)	5 Dec 2014	(The Bahamas) Kendal G. L. Isaacs National Gymnasium, Nassau, Bahamas	
17	Win	16–1	(Dominican Republic) Valerio Marte	TKO	1 (8), 1:27	20 Nov 2014	Gimnasio Pina Acevedo, Santo Domingo, Dominican Republic	
16	Win	15–1	(United States) Mike Gavronski	UD	10	11 Jul 2014	(United States) Little Creek Casino Resort, Shelton, Washington, US	Won vacant WBC Continental Americas middleweight title
15	Loss	14–1	(United States) Curtis Stevens	TKO	10 (10), 2:09	4 Apr 2014	(United States) Liacouras Center, Philadelphia, Pennsylvania, US	
14	Win	14–0	(United States) Willie Fortune	UD	8	22 Feb 2013	(United States) Morongo Casino Resort & Spa, Cabazon, California, US	
13	Win	13–0	(Dominican Republic) Jose Morla	TKO	3 (6), 0:34	2 Oct 2012	Gimnasio Joan Guzman, Consuelo, Dominican Republic	
12	Win	12–0	(Dominican Republic) Jonalis Reyes	TKO	1 (4), 2:06	28 Sep 2012	Casa Puerto Rico, La Romana, Dominican Republic	
11	Win	11–0	(United States) Cleven Ishe	TKO	4 (6), 2:23	1 Sep 2012	(United States) Turning Stone Resort & Casino, Verona, New York, US	
10	Win	10–0	(Mexico) Arturo Rodriguez	KO	1 (4), 1:49	20 Jul 2012	(United States) Chumash Casino, Santa Ynez, California, US	
9	Win	9–0	(United States) Roberto Yong	UD	6	16 Jun 2012	(United States) Prudential Center, Newark, New Jersey, US	
8	Win	8–0	(Dominican Republic) Alexander Hernandez	TKO	2 (6)	14 May 2012	Gimnasio Joan Guzman, Consuelo, Dominican Republic	
7	Win	7–0	(Brazil) Edvan dos Santos Barros	UD	6	2 Mar 2012	(United States) Westin Diplomat Resort, Hollywood, Florida, US	
6	Win	6–0	(United States) Joseph Benjamin	UD	4	18 Feb 2012	(United States) Winston-Salem, North Carolina, US	
5	Win	5–0	(United States) Eddie Gates	TKO	2 (6), 2:16	7 Jan 2012	(United States) Westin Diplomat Resort, Hollywood, Florida, US	
4	Win	4–0	(United States) Roy Ashworth	KO	1 (4), 1:31	24 Jul 2010	(United States) Fitzgerald's Casino & Hotel, Tunica, Mississippi, US	
3	Win	3–0	(United States) Anthony Bowman	TKO	4 (4), 1:06	30 Apr 2010	(United States) Harlow's Casino, Greenville, Mississippi, US	
2	Win	2–0	(United States) Ryan Bianchini	TKO	1 (4), 0:43	16 Apr 2010	(United States) Omni New Daisy Theater, Memphis, Tennessee, US	
1	Win	1–0	(United States) Cleoney Fuqua	TKO	1 (4), 2:50	5 Mar 2010	(United States) Center Stage, Atlanta, Georgia, US	
