= Precious Makina =

Zambian boxer (born 1985)

Precious Makina (born October 2, 1985) is a Zambian amateur boxer who competed at the 2008 Summer Olympics in Beijing at welterweight (-69 kg) but lost to China's Kanat Islam.

Makina participated in the 2011 All-Africa Games but lost to Richarno Colin, eventual winner, and did not medal.
