= Vilmos Balog =

Hungarian boxer

Personal information
- Nationality: Hungarian
- Born: 21 February 1975 (age 51) Mezőkövesd, Hungary
- Height: 1.82 m (6 ft 0 in)

Boxing career
- Stance: Orthodox

Boxing record
- Total fights: 29
- Wins: 29
- Win by KO: 16

Vilmos Balog (born 21 February 1975) is a Hungarian former professional boxer who competed from 2005 to 2010. As an amateur, he represented his country at the 2004 Summer Olympics.

== Amateur career ==
At the 2004 Olympics in Athens, Greece, he was stopped in the second round of the men's welterweight division (– 69 kg) by Colombia's Juan Camilo Novoa. Coached by former Olympian boxer András Botos he qualified for the Athens Games by ending up in first place at the 1st AIBA European 2004 Olympic Qualifying Tournament in Plovdiv, Bulgaria. In the final he defeated Ukraine's Viktor Polyakov.
