= Germán Martínez (swimmer) =

Colombian swimmer

Personal information
- Full name: Germán Elberto Martínez Díaz
- Born: June 5, 1979 (age 47)

Sport
- Sport: Swimming

Germán Elberto Martínez Díaz (born June 5, 1979) is a backstroke swimmer from Colombia who competed at the 2000 Summer Olympics in Sydney for his native country. There he ended up in 50th place in the Men's 100m Backstroke, clocking 59.94 in the preliminary heats.
