= Roberto Guerra =

Cuban boxer

Personal information
- Nationality: Cuban
- Born: 18 September 1979 (age 46)

Sport
- Sport: Boxing
Medal record
Men's amateur boxing
Representing Cuba
Goodwill Games
Bronze medal – third place	1998 New York	Welterweight

Roberto Guerra (born 18 September 1979) is a Cuban boxer. He competed in the men's welterweight event at the 2000 Summer Olympics.
