= Steven Küchler =

German boxer

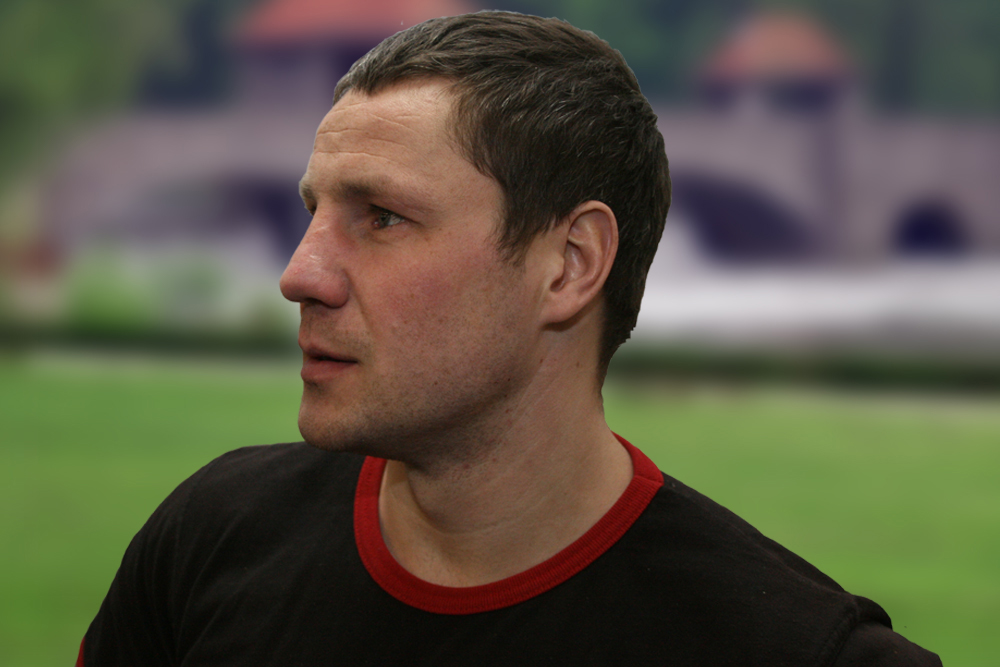
- Steven Küchler in 2009

Personal information
- Full name: Steven Küchler
- Nationality: Germany
- Born: November 5, 1975 (age 50) Schmölln, East Germany
- Height: 1.75 m (5 ft 9 in)
- Weight: 67 kg (148 lb)

Sport
- Sport: Boxing
- Weight class: Welterweight
Medal record
European Junior Championships
Gold medal – first place	1993 Thessaloniki	Bantamweight
World Military Cup
Gold medal – first place	1995 Rome	Light Welterweight
World Military Championships
Gold medal – first place	1998 Warendorf	Welterweight
Chemistry Cup
Gold medal – first place	1995 Halle	Light Welterweight
Gold medal – first place	1996 Halle	Lightweight
Gold medal – first place	1997 Halle	Light Welterweight
Gold medal – first place	1998 Halle	Light Welterweight
Gold medal – first place	1999 Halle	Welterweight
Gold medal – first place	2000 Halle	Welterweight
Gold medal – first place	2001 Halle	Welterweight

Steven Küchler (born November 5, 1975, in Schmölln, Thuringia) is a boxer from Germany, who is nicknamed Mr. Hollywood.

== Amateur ==
He represented his native country at the 2000 Summer Olympics in Sydney, Australia. There he was stopped in the quarterfinals of the Men's Welterweight Division (– 67 kg) division by Romania's eventual bronze medalist Dorel Simion. Out of 261 amateur fights, he won 234.

== Professional Boxer ==
Küchler began his professional boxing career in 2002, representing the box promotion "Universum" and after 7 fights and several injuries, he decided to retire from boxing in 2004. In 2010, he made a comeback in the middleweight division.

== Work as a trainer ==
Steven Küchler is now working with several professional and amateur boxers, including triple world champion Nicole Wesner, who is holding world champion titles of WBF, WIBF and GBU.
