= 1997 Asian Amateur Boxing Championships =

Boxing competitions

1997 Asian Boxing Championships
- Host city: Kuala Lumpur, Malaysia
- Dates: 25–31 August 1997

The 19th edition of the Men's Asian Amateur Boxing Championships were held from 25 to 31 August 1997, in Kuala Lumpur, Malaysia.

== Medal summary ==
| Event | Gold | Silver | Bronze |
|---|---|---|---|
| Light flyweight 48 kg | Suban Pannon; Thailand | Abdul Rashid Qambrani; Pakistan | Byambabayaryn Atarbayar; Mongolia |
| Light flyweight 48 kg | Suban Pannon; Thailand | Abdul Rashid Qambrani; Pakistan | Damianus Jordan; Indonesia |
| Flyweight; 51 kg | Pramuansak Phosuwan; Thailand | Alisher Rahimov; Uzbekistan | Roning Tama-Nga; Malaysia |
| Flyweight; 51 kg | Pramuansak Phosuwan; Thailand | Alisher Rahimov; Uzbekistan | Kim Tae-kyu; South Korea |
| Bantamweight; 54 kg | Sontaya Wongprates; Thailand | Akbar Ahadi; Iran | Berik Muratov; Kazakhstan |
| Bantamweight; 54 kg | Sontaya Wongprates; Thailand | Akbar Ahadi; Iran | Shahid Jan; Pakistan |
| Featherweight; 57 kg | Tulkunbay Turgunov; Uzbekistan | Bijan Batmani; Iran | Somchai Nakbalee; Thailand |
| Featherweight; 57 kg | Tulkunbay Turgunov; Uzbekistan | Bijan Batmani; Iran | Kim Chang-hyun; South Korea |
| Lightweight; 60 kg | Muhammad Abdullaev; Uzbekistan | Shin Eun-chul; South Korea | Pongsith Wiangwiset; Thailand |
| Lightweight; 60 kg | Muhammad Abdullaev; Uzbekistan | Shin Eun-chul; South Korea | Asghar Ali Shah; Pakistan |
| Light welterweight 63.5 kg | Babak Moghimi; Iran | Kenzhebek Akelbaev; Kyrgyzstan | Densmaagiin Enkhsaikhan; Mongolia |
| Light welterweight 63.5 kg | Babak Moghimi; Iran | Kenzhebek Akelbaev; Kyrgyzstan | Farkhad Bakirov; Uzbekistan |
| Welterweight; 67 kg | Nurzhan Smanov; Kazakhstan | Nariman Ataev; Uzbekistan | Bae Ho-jo; South Korea |
| Welterweight; 67 kg | Nurzhan Smanov; Kazakhstan | Nariman Ataev; Uzbekistan | Komgrit Nanakon; Thailand |
| Light middleweight 71 kg | Esfandiar Mohammadi; Iran | Ikrom Berdiev; Uzbekistan | Im Jung-bin; South Korea |
| Light middleweight 71 kg | Esfandiar Mohammadi; Iran | Ikrom Berdiev; Uzbekistan | Bakhtiyar Khodzhiyev; Kazakhstan |
| Middleweight; 75 kg | Chainarong Kanha; Thailand | Dilshod Yarbekov; Uzbekistan | Andrey Sheludtsov; Kazakhstan |
| Middleweight; 75 kg | Chainarong Kanha; Thailand | Dilshod Yarbekov; Uzbekistan | Emil Boylo; Kyrgyzstan |
| Light heavyweight 81 kg | Sergey Mihaylov; Uzbekistan | Arkadiy Topayev; Kazakhstan | Gurcharan Singh; India |
| Light heavyweight 81 kg | Sergey Mihaylov; Uzbekistan | Arkadiy Topayev; Kazakhstan | Somsak Chantraporn; Thailand |
| Heavyweight; 91 kg | Samat Musatayev; Kazakhstan | Lee Hyun-sung; South Korea | Armadin Kassim; Malaysia |
| Heavyweight; 91 kg | Samat Musatayev; Kazakhstan | Lee Hyun-sung; South Korea | Timur Ibragimov; Uzbekistan |
| Super heavyweight +91 kg | Mohammad Reza Samadi; Iran | Harpal Singh; India | Lee Kang-un; South Korea |
| Super heavyweight +91 kg | Mohammad Reza Samadi; Iran | Harpal Singh; India | Lazizbek Zokirov; Uzbekistan |

== Medal table ==
| Rank | Nation | Gold | Silver | Bronze | Total |
|---|---|---|---|---|---|
| 1 | Thailand | 4 | 0 | 4 | 8 |
| 2 | Uzbekistan | 3 | 4 | 3 | 10 |
| 3 | Iran | 3 | 2 | 0 | 5 |
| 4 | Kazakhstan | 2 | 1 | 3 | 6 |
| 5 | South Korea | 0 | 2 | 5 | 7 |
| 6 | Pakistan | 0 | 1 | 2 | 3 |
| 7 | India | 0 | 1 | 1 | 2 |
| 7 | Kyrgyzstan | 0 | 1 | 1 | 2 |
| 9 | Malaysia | 0 | 0 | 2 | 2 |
| 9 | Mongolia | 0 | 0 | 2 | 2 |
| 11 | Indonesia | 0 | 0 | 1 | 1 |
| Totals (11 entries) | | 12 | 12 | 24 | 48 |
