= Rolande Moses =

Grenadian boxer

Personal information
- Full name: Rolande Moses
- Born: 24 January 1983 (age 43)
- Height: 1.80 m (5 ft 11 in)
- Weight: 69 kg (152 lb)

Sport
- Country: Grenada
- Sport: Boxing

Rolande Moses (born January 24, 1983, in Saint David Parish, Grenada) is a male amateur boxer from Grenada, who fought at the 2008 Summer Olympics in the men's welterweight division.

He entered into the Olympic Trials with only nine fights. He did not have to qualify for Grenada's Olympic team in the usual manner - that is he did not have to become a national champion or win international qualifying bouts. Instead, Moses is able to box for Grenada on a technicality. Under Olympic rules, countries that are unrepresented can apply for athletes to be given berths at the Games. Grenada applied for, and was given, a berth for Moses. He is considered a long shot to medal at the games.

Moses' family moved to Toronto when he was seven years old. He competed high school and attended Niagara College for two years in which he took Business Administration. At the 2007 World Championships he lost his first bout to Sweden's Abdo-Iriba Yasser by stoppage, at the first Olympic qualifier he was defeated by Diego Chaves: 2:12. At the Olympics 2008 he lost his first round opener to Tureano Johnson of the Bahamas.

== Other achievements ==
- Ringside World Championships, Kansas City 2005 (semi-finals) and 2006
- The Ray McGibbons Gloves, St.Catharines (Silver)
- Provincial Championships, St.Catharines (Gold)
