= Bijan Batmani =

Iranian boxer (born 1972)

Personal information
- Born: 22 December 1972 (age 53) Kermanshah, Iran

Sport
- Country: Iran
- Sport: Boxing
Medal record
Asian Championships
Gold medal – first place	1994 Tehran	54 kg
Silver medal – second place	1997 Kuala Lumpur	57 kg
West Asian Games
Silver medal – second place	1997 Tehran	57 kg

Bijan Batmani (Persian: بیژن باتمانی; born 22 December 1972 in Kermanshah) is an Iranian boxer of Kurdish origin. He competed at the 2000 Summer Olympics in Sydney, in the featherweight.
