= Olexandr Stretskyy =

Ukrainian boxer

Personal information
- Nationality: Ukrainian
- Born: 6 May 1986 (age 40) Dnipropetrovsk, Ukrainian SSR, Soviet Union
- Height: 1.81 m (5 ft 11 in)
- Weight: Middleweight

Boxing career
- Stance: Southpaw

Boxing record
- Total fights: 1
- Wins: 1
- Win by KO: 1
- Losses: 0
Medal record
European Championships
Bronze medal – third place	2006 Plovdiv	Welterweight
European Olympic Qualifying
Silver medal – second place	2008 Roseto degli Abruzzi–Pescara	Welterweight

Olexandr Stretskyy, also known as Oleksandr Stretskiy, (born 6 May 1986) is a Ukrainian professional boxer who competes as a middleweight. As an amateur, he won a bronze medal in the welterweight division of the 2006 European Amateur Boxing Championships and thereby qualified to represent Ukraine at the 2008 Olympics.

== Amateur career ==
=== European Championships results ===
2006

- Defeated Borna Katalinić (Croatia)
- Defeated Samuel Matevosyan (Armenia)
- Lost to Andrey Balanov (Russia) 31-11

=== Olympic Games results ===
2008

- Defeated Gilbert Lenin Castillo (Dominican Republic) 9-6
- Lost to Tureano Johnson (Bahamas) 4-9

== Professional boxing record ==
1 fight	1 win	0 losses
By knockout	1	0

No.	Result	Record	Opponent	Type	Round, time	Date	Location	Notes
1	Win	1–0	(Belarus) Aliaksandr Kulbianok	TKO	1 (4), 2:55	12 Nov 2016	CityZEN, Poznań, Poland	Professional debut
