= Yovanny Lorenzo =

Dominican boxer (born 1980)

Personal information
- Nationality: Dominican
- Born: 13 October 1980 (age 44); Jeringa, Dominican Republic

Sport
- Sport: Boxing

Yovanny Lorenzo (born 13 October 1980) is a Dominican boxer. He competed in the men's welterweight event at the 2000 Summer Olympics.
