= Adam Trupish =

Canadian boxer

Personal information
- Born: February 8, 1979 (age 47) London, Ontario, Canada

Sport
- Sport: Boxing

Adam Trupish (born February 8, 1979) is a Canadian welterweight (– 69 kg) division boxer. He is a two-time Olympian and was ranked 5th in the world (among welterweights) after the 2007 World Amateur Boxing Championships.

== 2004 Summer Olympics ==
He represented his native country at the 2004 Summer Olympics in Athens, Greece, where he was eliminated by technical knockout in the first round by Ruslan Khairov of Azerbaijan.

Trupish qualified for the Athens Games as a lucky semifinal loser in the second tournament in Tijuana, Mexico. He took the place of Juan McPherson (USA), finalist from the 2003 Pan American Games. However his quota was dropped by the USA Boxing Association due to unsuccessful presentation at the USA Olympic trials. Winner of those trials Vanes Martirosyan qualified for the Qualifying Tournament in Tijuana.

== 2008 Summer Olympics ==
Trupish was the only Canadian boxer (in any weight class) to qualify for the 2008 Summer Olympics in Beijing. The CBC projected a first-bout loss and he was, in fact, eliminated after the first bout against Bakhyt Sarsekbayev of Kazakhstan by a points loss of 20–1. Afterward, Trupish was heavily criticised in the Canadian press for his poor performance—the Edmonton Sun said he was "absolutely annihilated"—but was also given credit for giving a wake-up call to Boxing Canada. The embarrassment of seeing their only fighter soundly defeated in the first round is expected to bring attention to the need for Canada to provide better funding and training to their athletes.
