= Usman Ullah Khan =

Pakistani boxer (1974–2020)

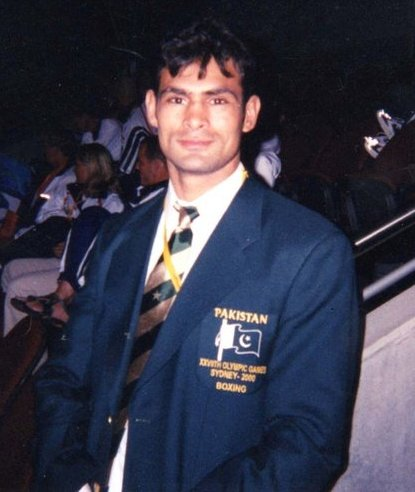

Personal information
- Nationality: Pakistani
- Born: 29 September 1974; Faisalabad, Pakistan
- Died: 20 February 2020 (aged 45); Canada

Sport
- Sport: Boxing

Usman Ullah Khan (29 September 1974 – 20 February 2020) was a Pakistani boxer. He competed at the 1996 Summer Olympics and the 2000 Summer Olympics.

Khan died of cancer in Canada in early 2020. He was 45.
