= Iraj Kiarostami =

Iranian boxer

Personal information
- Full name: Iraj Kiarostami
- Nationality: Iranian
- Born: July 7, 1963 Tehran, Iran
- Died: 6 August 2015 (aged 52) Tehran, Iran

Sport
- Sport: Boxing
Medal record
Asian Games
Bronze medal – third place	1990 Beijing	+91 kg
Asian Championships
Silver medal – second place	1994 Tehran	+91 kg

Iraj Kiarostami (Persian: ایرج کیارستمی; 7 July 1963 – 6 August 2015) was an amateur boxer from Iran, who competed in the 1992 Summer Olympics in the Super heavyweight (+91 kg) division and lost in the first round to Jerry Nijman of the Netherlands. He is also an Asian Games bronze medalist.
