= Rubén Fuchú =

Puerto Rican boxer

Personal information
- Nationality: Puerto Rican
- Born: 27 July 1978 (age 46); Toa Alta, Puerto Rico

Sport
- Sport: Boxing

Rubén Fuchú (born 27 July 1978) is a Puerto Rican boxer. He competed in the men's welterweight event at the 2000 Summer Olympics.
