= Bülent Ulusoy =

Turkish boxer (born 1978)

Personal information
- Born: January 7, 1978 (age 48) Trabzon, Turkey
Medal record
Men's boxing
Representing Turkey
European Amateur Championships
Gold medal – first place	2000 Tampere	Welterweight
EU Championships
Gold medal – first place	2003 Strasbourg	Welterweight
Gold medal – first place	2004 Madrid	Welterweight
Silver medal – second place	2006 Pécs	Welterweight
World Amateur Championships
Bronze medal – third place	2001 Belfast	Light Middleweight
Mediterranean Games
Gold medal – first place	1997 Bari	Welterweight
Gold medal – first place	2001 Tunis	Light Middleweight
Gold medal – first place	2005 Almeria	Welterweight

Bülent Ulusoy (born January 7, 1978, in Trabzon) is a Turkish boxer best known to win the European title 2000 at welterweight.

== Career ==
In 2000, Bulent Ulusoy won the Euro welterweight title. At the Olympics 2000 he lost the quarterfinal to Vitalie Gruşac. In 2001 he competed at the world championships at junior middleweight and beat Jean Pascal and lost to Marian Simion 19:20.

Ulusoy qualified for the 2004 Summer Olympics by ending up in first place at the 4th AIBA European 2004 Olympic Qualifying Tournament in Baku, Azerbaijan. At the Olympics 2004 he lost in the men's welterweight division to Sherzod Husanov.

He won the 2005 Mediterranean Games. At the European Championships 2006 he lost his first match against Russian favorite Andrey Balanov.
