= Aliasker Başirow =

Turkmenistan boxer

Aliasker Bashirov
Personal information
- Full name: Aliasker Bashirov
- Nationality: Turkmenistan
- Born: June 27, 1979 (age 47) Aşgabat, Ahal Province
- Height: 1.80 m (5 ft 11 in)
- Weight: 69 kg (152 lb)

Sport
- Sport: Boxing
- Weight class: Welterweight
Medal record
Asian Championships
Silver medal – second place	2005 Ho Chi Minh City	Welterweight

Aliasker Bashirov (born June 27, 1979) is an amateur boxer from Ashgabat, Turkmenistan, who fought at the 2004 and 2008 Olympics at welterweight.

Bashirov qualified for the 2004 Summer Olympics in Athens by ending up in second place at the 1st AIBA Asian 2004 Olympic Qualifying Tournament in Guangzhou, China. In the final, he lost to Kanat Islam of China. At the 2004 Summer Olympics, he beat Rolandas Jasevicius but lost his second match to the eventual winner, Bakhtiyar Artayev of Kazakhstan.

At the 2008 Summer Olympics, he lost his first bout to Jaoid Chiguer (6:17).
