= Abdul Rasheed Baloch =

Pakistani boxer (born 1972)

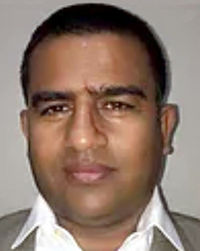
- Abdul Rasheed Baloch

Personal information
- Nickname: Black Mamba
- Citizenship: Pakistan New Zealand
- Born: Abdul Rasheed Baloch; 7 April 1972 (age 54) Hyderabad, Pakistan
- Weight: Lightweight; Light welterweight; Welterweight
- Children: Zaigham Rasheed Baloch

Boxing career
- Stance: Orthodox

Boxing record
- Total fights: 116
- Wins: 98
- Win by KO: 85
- Losses: 18
- Draws: 0

Abdul Rasheed Baloch (born April 7, 1972) is a Pakistani boxer and Olympian. As an amateur, he was the Pakistan captain from 1997 to 1998. In the 1996 Olympic Games, he won his first fight against a Mexican boxer but lost his second match against a Kazakhstan boxer in 67 kg.

== Career ==
In 1995, Baloch won Golds in the Agon Cup, Malaysia, and Quaid-i-Azam International Cup, Silver in the 1995 South Asian Games, the KESC Cup, and the Green Hill Cup, Pakistan, and Bronze in the Giraldo Cordova Cardin International Boxing Tournament, Cuba.

He moved to Japan and turned professional in 1999. Rasheed defeated Joel Burke for the NSW Middleweight title in 2001, and went on to fight for the vacant OBA light middleweight title against John Wayne Parr, losing due to a broken right hand.

He was Pakistani champion from 1993 to 1998, and competed in the National Games (1997–98), the 7th Saf Games India (1995), the China Cup (1995), the 9th Mayor's Cup, Philippines (1996), the Asian Championship in Malaysia (1997), the 10th Mayor's Cup, Philippines (1998), Green Hill Cup, Pakistan (1998), and the Asian Games in Thailand (1998).

In 2001 in Australia he won the NSW title in middleweight. In 2004-05 he went to Liberia training the Pakistan Army boxing team in a United Nation mission. In 2014 he retired from boxing with a record of 6 wins out of 18 professional fights.

== Professional boxing record ==
| Date | Weight | Opponent | Opponent weight | Opponent record | Location | Result | Type | Round / Scheduled | Notes |
|---|---|---|---|---|---|---|---|---|---|
| 2014-05-23 | 97.0 | James Emmerson | 91.4 | 0–1–0 | ABA Stadium, Auckland | Loss | UD | 4/4 | Emmerson down in round 2 Ref: Craig Thomson 37–38, Douglas Carrick Belton 37–38, Rosa Puni 37–39 |
| 2011-05-07 | 86.2 | Mohamed Azzaoui | 89.9 | 25–6–3 | ASB Stadium, Kohimarama | Loss | UD | 3/3 | Cruiserweight tournament – Quarter Final 1 Ref: Reg Williams 27–30, Bruce Glozier 27–30, Steve Miles 27–30 |
| 2010-04-30 | 88.6 | Brad Pitt | 89.4 | 3–0–0 | Assyrian Sports & Culture Club, Fairfield Heights | Loss | KO | 2/6 | Time: 0:36; Ref: Mick Heafey |
| 2009-03-27 | 84.0 | Rico Chong Nee | 86.4 | 11–8–2 | Manurewa Netball Centre, Manurewa | Win | TKO | 5/6 | Injury stoppage Scores: 39–37, 39–36, 39–38 |
| 2009-03-06 | 81.9 | Michael Bolling | 79.8 | 4–0–0 | Croatian Club, Punchbowl | Loss | TKO | 3/6 | Time: 1:53 |
| 2009-02-11 | 81.3 | Kerry Foley | 79.4 | 10–0–0 | Entertainment Centre, Wollongong | Loss | TKO | 3/6 | On towel – 1:08 |
| 2007-08-30 | 80.2 | Lee Oti | 71.6 | 8–6–0 | ABA Stadium, Auckland | Loss | UD | 8/8 | Scores: 73–80, 72–80, 73–79 |
| 2007-07-06 | 77.3 | Sonni Michael Angelo | 77.0 | 13–5–0 | Central Coast Rugby League Club, Gosford | Loss | KO | 6/6 | Time: 0:53 |
| 2002-02-08 | 71.8 | Sakio Bika | 72.4 | 6–0–0 | Le Montage Function Centre, Sydney | Loss | KO | 4/6 | Time: 2:11 |
| 2001-09-21 | 69.8 | John Wayne Parr | 69.9 | 8–1–0 | Southport Sharks AFL Club, Southport | Loss | TKO | 5/12 | |
| 2001-05-25 | 72.2 | Joel Bourke | 72.0 | 5–3–0 | Dept of Defence, Dubbo | Win | TD | 5/10 | ANBF NSW Middleweight (vacant) |
| 2001-05-11 | 75.0 | Stuart McKinnon | 79.4 | 1–0–0 | Hornsby RSL Club, Sydney | Loss | PTS | 6/6 | |
| 2001-05-04 | 73.8 | Benny Horra | 79.6 | 7–9–1 | Wyong RSL Club, Wyong | Win | PTS | 8/8 | |
| 2001-02-23 | 72.0 | Craig Parke | 68.4 | 4–0–0 | Hornsby RSL Club, Sydney | Win | PTS | 6/6 | |
| 2001-02-09 | 72.8 | Waqa Kolivuso | 74.2 | Debut | Le Montage Events Centre, Leichhardt | Win | TKO | 1/6 | |
| 2000-05-10 | 69.8 | Crazy Kim | 69.8 | 6–2–0 | Korakuen Hall, Tokyo | Loss | KO | 2/8 | |
| 2000-01-08 | 71.5 | Tomoki Terada | 71.1 | 4–3–1 | Korakuen Hall, Tokyo | Win | PTS | 6/6 | |
| 1999-10-21 | 68.9 | Takenori Sakaguchi | 69.8 | 9–1–0 | Prefectural Gymnasium, Osaka | Loss | PTS | 6/6 | |

== Pakistan Boxing Council ==
In 2016, Abdul Rasheed Baloch founded the Pakistan Boxing Association. In 2017, he established the Pakistan Professional Boxing Federation, later renamed the Pakistan Boxing Council, serving as its first president. He stepped down in 2024, after which his son, Zaigham Rasheed Baloch, succeeded him as president.
