= Bae Ho-jo =

South Korean boxer (born 1977)

Personal information
- Nationality: South Korean
- Born: 1 July 1977 (age 49)
- Height: 174 cm (5 ft 9 in)
- Weight: 67 kg (148 lb)

Sport
- Sport: Boxing
- College team: Korea National University of Physical Education
Medal record
Representing South Korea
Men's Boxing
Asian Games
| Bronze medal – third place | 1998 Bangkok | Welterweight |
Asian Amateur Boxing Championships
| Bronze medal – third place | 1997 Kuala Lumpur | Welterweight |

Korean name
- Hangul: 배호조
- RR: Bae Hojo
- MR: Pae Hojo

Bae Ho-jo (Korean: 배호조; born 1 July 1977) is a South Korean former boxer.

Bae won the bronze medal in the welterweight event at 1997 Asian Amateur Boxing Championships and the next year also at the 1998 Asian Games in Bangkok. He also competed at other international competitions, including in the men's welterweight event at the 1996 Summer Olympics.
