= Theodoros Kotakos =

Greek boxer (born 1976)

Personal information
- Nationality: Greek
- Born: 10 April 1976 (age 49)

Sport
- Sport: Boxing

Theodoros Kotakos (born 10 April 1976) is a Greek boxer. He competed in the men's welterweight event at the 2004 Summer Olympics.
