= Francisco Calderón =

Colombian male boxer

Personal information
- Nationality: Colombian
- Born: 2 March 1971 (age 54)

Sport
- Sport: Boxing

Francisco Calderón (born 2 March 1971) is a Colombian boxer. He competed in the men's welterweight event at the 2000 Summer Olympics.
