= Juan McPherson =

American boxer

Personal information
- Full name: Juan McPherson
- Nickname: The Majic Juan
- Nationality: United States
- Born: June 26, 1984 (age 42)
- Height: 1.85 m (6 ft 1 in)
- Weight: 69 kg (152 lb)

Sport
- Sport: Boxing
- Weight class: Welterweight
Medal record
Pan American Games
Silver medal – second place	2003 Santo Domingo	Welterweight

Juan McPherson (born June 26, 1984) is a retired male boxer from the United States. He won a silver medal in the men's welterweight division at the 2003 Pan American Games, and earned the right to go to the 2004 Summer Olympics.

Instead Canada's Adam Trupish qualified for the Athens Games as a lucky semifinal loser in the second tournament in Tijuana, Mexico. He took the place of McPherson when his quota was dropped by the USA Boxing Association due to unsuccessful presentation at the USA Olympic trials. The winner of those trials, Vanes Martirosyan, qualified for the Qualifying Tournament in Tijuana.

McPherson made his professional debut on August 26, 2005, against Wilmer Torres.
