= Nurbek Kasenov =

Kyrgyzstani boxer (born 1976)

Personal information
- Nationality: Kyrgyzstani
- Born: 3 January 1976 (age 49)

Sport
- Sport: Boxing

Nurbek Kasenov (born 3 January 1976) is a Kyrgyzstani former boxer. He competed at the 1996 Summer Olympics and the 2000 Summer Olympics.
