= Daniyar Munaytbasov =

Kazakhstani boxer (born 1976)

Daniyar Munaytbasov (Russian: Данияр Мунайтбасов; born March 30, 1976) is a boxer from Kazakhstan. He represented his native country at the 2000 Summer Olympics in Sydney. There he was stopped in the quarterfinals of the Men's Welterweight Division (– 67 kg) division by Ukraine's eventual silver medalist Sergey Dotsenko.
