= Guillermo Saputo =

Argentine boxer

Personal information
- Born: May 1, 1977 (age 49) José C. Paz Partido, Buenos Aires, Argentina

Sport
- Sport: Boxing

Guillermo Javier Saputo (born May 1, 1977) is a light middleweight boxer from Argentina, who represented his native country at two consecutive Summer Olympics, starting in 1996 in Atlanta, Georgia. He also represented Argentina at the 1995 Pan American Games and 1999 Pan American Games. Nicknamed "El Tano" and/or "El Caballero" he made his professional debut in 2001.

== Professional boxing record ==
17 Wins (11 knockouts), 0 Losses, 0 Draws
| Res. | Record | Opponent | Type | Rd., Time | Date | Location | Notes |
| Win | 17-0 | (Argentina) Gustavo Martin Lencina | TKO | 2 (10) | 2013-10-18 | Club El Porvenir, Jose C. Paz, Buenos Aires, Argentina | |
| Win | 16-0 | (Argentina) Cesar Alberto Leiva | UD | 10 (10) | 2005-12-03 | Club Nolting, Ciudadela, Buenos Aires, Argentina | |
| Win | 15-0 | (Argentina) Ruben Dario Oliva | UD | 10 (10) | 2005-10-22 | Estadio F.A.B., Buenos Aires, Distrito Federal, Argentina | |
| Win | 14-0 | (Argentina) Ruben Dario Oliva | UD | 10 (10) | 2005-02-05 | Club Caza y Pesca, Villa Carlos Paz, Cordoba, Argentina | |
| Win | 13–0 | (Argentina) Javier Alejandro Blanco | TKO | 6 (8) | 2004-07-31 | Estadio F.A.B., Buenos Aires, Distrito Federal, Argentina | |
| Win | 12-0 | (Argentina) Hector Amadeo Zelaya | TKO | 3 (6) | 2004-06-19 | Luna Park, Buenos Aires, Distrito Federal, Argentina | |
| Win | 11-0 | (Mexico) Alejandro Jimenez | TKO | 7 (8) | 2003-08-08 | (United States) Sports Arena, Pico Rivera, California, USA | |
| Win | 10-0 | (Mexico) Miguel Angel Ramirez | TKO | 3 (6) | 2003-05-09 | (United States) Sports Arena, San Diego, California, USA | |
| Win | 9–0 | (Colombia) Fray Luis Sierra | TKO | 3 (6) | 2003-03-06 | (United States) Level Nightclub, Miami, Florida, USA | |
| Win | 8–0 | (Colombia) Alex Carrillo Villa | TKO | 2 (6) | 2003-01-16 | (United States) Olympic Auditorium, Los Angeles, California, USA | |
| Win | 7–0 | (United States) Ruben Munoz | UD | 6 (6) | 2002-08-22 | (United States) Marriott Hotel, Irvine, California, USA | |
| Win | 6–0 | (Mexico) Juan Carlos Alvarez | TKO | 2 (4) | 2002-06-18 | (United States) Thoroughbred Club, Del Mar, California, USA | |
