= Vitalie Grușac =

Moldovan boxer (born 1977)

Medal record

Men's Boxing

Representing Moldova

Olympic Games
Bronze medal – third place	2000 Sydney	Welterweight

Vitaly Gruşac (born 11 September 1977) is a Moldovan Olympic medal boxer from Grimancauti village (a well-known Moldavian boxing centre). He competed in the Welterweight division (67 kilograms [148 lb]) at the 2000 Summer Olympics. Gruşac qualified for the 2004 Summer Olympics by taking second place at the 4th AIBA European 2004 Olympic Qualifying Tournament in Baku, Azerbaijan.

== Olympic 2000 results ==
- Round of 32: Saturday, September 16, 2000. Defeated Aregawi Tsegasellase (Ethiopia) walkover
- Round of 16: Thursday, September 21, 2000. Defeated Sherzod Husanov (Uzbekistan) 13-7
- Quarter-finals: Tuesday, September 26, 2000. Defeated Bülent Ulusoy (Turkey) 19-10
- Semi-finals: Thursday, September 28, 2000. Lost to Sergey Dotsenko (Ukraine) 8-17
