= Ruslan Khairov =

Azerbaijani boxer

Ruslan Xeyirov
Personal information
- Full name: Ruslan Sabir Xeyirov
- Nationality: Azerbaijan
- Born: January 7, 1976 (age 50) Kaspiysk, Russian SFSR, Soviet Union
- Height: 1.75 m (5 ft 9 in)
- Weight: 69 kg (152 lb)

Sport
- Sport: Boxing
- Weight class: Welterweight
- Club: Neftchi Petrol, Bakı
Medal record
World Amateur Championships
Bronze medal – third place	2003 Bangkok	Welterweight
European Amateur Championships
Bronze medal – third place	2004 Pula	Welterweigjt

Ruslan Sabirovich Khairov (born January 7, 1976, Kaspiysk, Dagestan) is a Russian-born former boxer from Azerbaijan. He competed in the Welterweight (– 69 kg) division, and won bronze medals at the 2003 World Amateur Boxing Championships and 2004 European Amateur Boxing Championships.

He competed at the Summer Olympics in 2000 and 2004, but was knocked out in the quarterfinals on both occasions, by Oleg Saitov of Russia in 2000 and Lorenzo Aragón of Cuba in 2004, both of whom proceeded to win gold and silver in their respective competitions. He retired from boxing in 2008. He currently resides in his hometown of Kaspiysk in Russia.
