= Kamel Chater =

Tunisian boxer (born 1972)

Personal information
- Born: 7 April 1972 (age 54)
Medal record
Men's Boxing
Representing Tunisia
All-Africa Games
Gold medal – first place	1995 Harare	Welterweight
Gold medal – first place	1999 Johannesburg	Welterweight

Kamel Chater (born 7 April 1972) is a welterweight boxer from Tunisia, who twice won the gold medal at the All-Africa Games in his weight division. He is a two-time Olympian (1996 and 2000).
