= Viktor Polyakov =

Ukrainian boxer

Personal information
- Nationality: Russian
- Born: Віктор Львович Поляков; September 29, 1981 (age 44) Perm, Russian SFSR, Soviet Union
- Height: 5 ft 8 in / 173cm
- Weight: Super middleweight

Boxing career
- Reach: 70″ / 178cm
- Stance: Orthodox

Boxing record
- Total fights: 21
- Wins: 13
- Win by KO: 6
- Losses: 7
- Draws: 1
Medal record
Men's amateur boxing
Representing Ukraine
Junior European Championships
Silver medal – second place	1999 Rijeka	Light welterweight

Viktor Lvovych Polyakov (born September 29, 1981, in Perm, Russia) is a boxer from Ukraine, who competed at the 2004 Summer Olympics in Athens, Greece.
