= Boxing at the 2000 Summer Olympics – Lightweight =

Boxing competitions

Men's lightweight boxing at the Games of the XXVII Olympiad
- Venue: Sydney Convention and Exhibition Centre
- Date: 17 September to 30 September 2000
- Competitors: 28 from 28 nations

Medalists
1st place, gold medalist(s)		Mario Kindelán	Cuba
2nd place, silver medalist(s)		Andriy Kotelnyk	Ukraine
3rd place, bronze medalist(s)		Cristián Bejarano	Mexico
3rd place, bronze medalist(s)		Aleksandr Maletin	Russia

The men's lightweight boxing competition at the 2000 Olympic Games in Sydney was held from 17 September to 30 September at the Sydney Convention and Exhibition Centre.

== Competition format ==
Like all Olympic boxing events, the competition was a straight single-elimination tournament. The event consisted of 28 boxers of different nationalities, who had qualified for the competition through various qualifying tournaments held in 1999 and 2000. The competition began with a preliminary round on 17 September, where the number of competitors was reduced to 16, and concluded with the final on 30 September. As there were fewer than 32 boxers in the competition, a number of boxers received a bye through the preliminary round. Both semi-final losers were awarded bronze medals.

All bouts consisted of four rounds of two minutes each, with one minute breaks between rounds. Punches scored only if the white area on the front of the glove made full contact with the front of the head or torso of the opponent. Five judges scored each bout; three of the judges had to signal a scoring punch within one second for the punch to score. The winner of the bout was the boxer who scored the most valid punches by the end of the bout.

== Competitors ==
Name	Country
Asghar Ali Shah	Pakistan
Tigkran Ouzlian	Greece
Mario Kindelán	Cuba
Pongsith Wiangwiset	Thailand
Norman Schuster	Germany
Patrick Lopez	Venezuela
Aleksandr Maletin	Russia
Makhach Nuriddinov	Azerbaijan
Naoufel Ben Rabah	Tunisia
David Jackson	United States
Selim Palyani	Turkey
Abdel Jalahi	France
Michael Katsidis	Australia
Agnaldo Nunes	Brazil
Artur Gevorgyan	Armenia
Nurzhan Karimzhanov	Kazakhstan
Larry Semillano	Philippines
Andriy Kotelnyk	Ukraine
Victor Ramos	Individual Olympic Athletes
Raymond Narh	Ghana
Gheorghe Lungu	Romania
Adisu Tebebu	Ethiopia
Cristián Bejarano	Mexico
Gilvert Khunwane	Botswana
Almazbek Raimkulov	Kyrgyzstan
Tumentsetseg Uitumen	Mongolia
José Cruz Lasso	Colombia
Giovanni Frontin	Mauritius

== Results ==
All times are Australian Time (UTC+10)

Round of 32; Sunday, September 17, 2000; 13:00 & 19:30
Norman Schuster (GER)	10
Patrick Lopez (VEN)	24
Aleksandr Maletin (RUS)	14
Mahac Nuriddinovun (AZE)	5
Naoufel Ben Rabah (TUN)	7
David Jackson (USA)	19
Selim Palyani (TUR)	14
Abdel Jebahi (FRA)	5
Michael Katsidis (AUS)	15
Agnaldo Nunes (BRA)	6
Artur Gevorgyan (ARM)	6
Nurzhan Karimzhanov (KAZ)	16
Larry Semillano (PHI)
Andriy Kotelnyk (UKR)	RSC
Victor Ramos (IOA)
Raymond Narh (GHA)	RSC
Gheorghe Lungu (ROM)	15
Adisu Tebebu (ETH)	3
Cristián Bejarano (MEX)	17
Gilbert Khunwane (BOT)	5
Almazbek Raimkulov (KGZ)	15
Tumentsetseg Uitumen (MGL)	4
José Leonardo Cruz (COL)	10
Giovanni Frontin (MRI)	9

Round of 16; Friday, September 22, 2000; 13:00 & 19:30
Asghar Ali Shah (PAK)	15
Tigkran Ouzlian (GRE)	17
Mario Kindelán (CUB)	14
Pongsith Wiangwiset (THA)	8
Patrick Lopez (VEN)
Aleksandr Maletin (RUS)	RSC
David Jackson (USA)
Selim Palyani (TUR)	WO
Michael Katsidis (AUS)	7
Nurzhan Karimzhanov (KAZ)	9
Andriy Kotelnyk (UKR)	17
Raymond Narh (GHA)	11
Gheorghe Lungu (ROM)	11
Cristián Bejarano (MEX)	14
Almazbek Raimkulov (KGZ)	12
José Cruz Lasso (COL)	2

Quarter-finals; Tuesday, September 26, 2000; 13:00 & 19:30
Tigkran Ouzlian (GRE)
Mario Kindelán (CUB)	RSC
Aleksandr Maletin (RUS)	RSC
Selim Palyani (TUR)
Nurzhan Karimzhanov (KAZ)
Andriy Kotelnyk (UKR)	RSC
Cristián Bejarano (MEX)	14
Almazbek Raimkulov (KGZ)	12

Semi-finals; Thursday, September 28, 2000; 19:30
Mario Kindelán (CUB)	27
Aleksandr Maletin (RUS)	15
Andriy Kotelnyk (UKR)	22
Cristián Bejarano (MEX)	14

Final; Saturday, September 30, 2000; 13:00
Mario Kindelán (CUB)	14
Andriy Kotelnyk (UKR)	4
