= Azerbaijan at the 2000 Summer Olympics =

- IOC code: AZE
- NOC: National Olympic Committee of the Republic of Azerbaijan
- Website: www.olympic.az (in Azerbaijani and English)

in Sydney
- Competitors: 31 in 8 sports
- Flag bearer: Namik Abdullayev
- Medals Ranked 34th: Gold 2 Silver 0 Bronze 1 Total 3

Summer Olympics appearances (overview)
- 1996; 2000; 2004; 2008; 2012; 2016; 2020; 2024; 2028

Other related appearances
- Russian Empire (1900–1912); Soviet Union (1952–1988); Unified Team (1992)

This was Azerbaijan's second Olympics as an independent nation, following the dissolution of the Soviet Union in 1991; it had competed as part of the Russian Unified Team in 1992, despite gaining its independence in 1991.

In the 2000 Summer Olympics in Sydney, Australia, Azerbaijan won two gold and one bronze medals, including their first Olympic golds. It tied for 34th in the medal count with the Bahamas. A total of 31 Azerbijani competitors, 25 men and 6 women, took part in 14 events in 8 sports.

== Medalists ==
After the 1992 Summer Olympics, the skeet shooting competition—which had been open to both sexes since its inception in 1968— was restricted to men only. That year, Zhang Shan won the mixed skeet, becoming the first and only woman to do so.

A separate women-only skeet shooting event was reinstated for the 2000 Summer Games (as was trap shooting). Zemfira Meftahatdinova won the skeet shooting competition, setting an Olympic record, scoring 98 of a possible 100 points.

Namig Abdullayev and American Sammie Henson were co-favorites for the gold medal in the men's freestyle 54 kg competition and faced each other in the final. Abdullayev took a 3-0 lead, but Henson battled back to tie it 3-3. In the last minute of the bout, however, Abdullayev scored a point on a reversal and won.

Vugar Alakbarov was 19 years old and had only boxed for four years when he became Azerbaijan's first Olympic boxer. In the middleweight class, he won his first three bouts, but lost in the semi-finals to Cuban Jorge Gutiérrez by a score of 18-14. Gutiérrez went on to win the gold.

Medal	Name	Sport	Event	Date
Gold	Zemfira Meftahatdinova	Shooting	Women's Skeet	21 September
Gold	Namig Abdullayev	Wrestling	Men's freestyle 54 kg	30 September
Bronze	Vugar Alakbarov	Boxing	Middleweight	30 September

== Athletics ==
Key

- Note–Ranks given for track events are within the athlete's heat only
- Q = Qualified for the next round by position in race or, in field events, by achieving the automatic qualification target
- q = Qualified for the next round as a fastest loser or, in field events, by position without achieving the qualifying target

Men
Track and road events

Athlete	Event	Heat		Quarterfinal		Semifinal		Final	
Athlete	Event	Time	Rank	Time	Rank	Time	Rank	Time	Rank
Teymur Gasimov	100 m	10.97	7	Did not advance					
Faig Baghirov	800 m	1:57.39	8	—N/a		Did not advance			

Field events

Athlete	Event	Qualification		Final	
Athlete	Event	Result	Rank	Result	Rank
Sergey Bochkov	Triple jump	16.01	30	Did not advance	

Women
Track and road events

Athlete	Event	Heat		Quarterfinal		Semifinal		Final	
Athlete	Event	Time	Rank	Time	Rank	Time	Rank	Time	Rank
Teymur Gasimov	Marathon	—N/a						DNF	

== Boxing ==
Athlete	Event	Round of 32	Round of 16	Quarterfinal	Semifinal	Final	
Athlete	Event	Opposition Result	Opposition Result	Opposition Result	Opposition Result	Opposition Result	Rank
Makhach Nuriddinov	Lightweight	Maletin (RUS); L 5–14	Did not advance				
Ruslan Khairov	Welterweight	Bye	Chater (TUN); W 13–8	Saitov (RUS); L 10–10*	Did not advance		
Vugar Alekperov	Middleweight	Ngumi (KEN); W 12–3	Miller (AUS); W 9–8	Kuloğlu (TUR); W 18–8	Gutiérrez (CUB); L 9–19	Did not advance	3rd place, bronze medalist(s)
Ali Ismayilov	Light Heavyweight	Krastev (BUL); W 14–9	Sergei Mikhailov (UZB); L 18–23	Did not advance			
Magomed Aripgadjiev	Heavyweight	—N/a	Sebastian Kober (GER); L 4–9	Did not advance			

== Diving ==
Athlete	Event	Preliminary		Semifinal				Final		Total	
Athlete	Event	Points	Rank	Points	Rank	Total	Rank	Points	Rank	Points	Rank
Emil Jabrayilov	Men's 10 m platform	334.74	26	Did not advance							

== Shooting ==
Women

Athlete	Event	Qualification		Final		Total	
Athlete	Event	Points	Rank	Points	Rank	Points	Rank
Irada Ashumova	10 m air pistol	227	45	Did not advance			
Irada Ashumova	25 m pistol	569	31	Did not advance			
Zemfira Meftahatdinova	Skeet	73	1 Q	25	=1	98	1st place, gold medalist(s)

== Swimming ==
Athlete	Event	Heat		Semifinal		Final	
Athlete	Event	Time	Rank	Time	Rank	Time	Rank
Emin Guliyev	Men's 50 m freestyle	25.36	60	Did not advance			
Alisa Khaleyeva	Women's 50 m freestyle	28.79	59	Did not advance			

== Weightlifting ==
Athlete	Event	Snatch			Clean & Jerk			Total	Rank
Athlete	Event	1	2	3	1	2	3	Total	Rank
Elkhan Suleymanov	Men's 62 kg	130.0	~~135.5~~	~~135.5~~	~~162.5~~	~~162.5~~	162.5	292.5	8
Turan Mirzayev	Men's 69 kg	140.0	145.0	147.5	175.0	180.0	~~182.5~~	327.5	9
Nizami Pashayev	Men's 85 kg	155.0	~~166.0~~	~~166.0~~	197.5	~~203.5~~	203.5	357.5	12
Tarana Abbasova	Women's 53 kg	70.0	~~75.0~~	75.0	85.0	90.0	~~92.5~~	165.0	10

== Wrestling ==
Freestyle

Athlete	Event	Elimination pool				Quarterfinals	Semifinals	Final / BM	
Athlete	Event	Opposition Result	Opposition Result	Opposition Result	Rank	Opposition Result	Opposition Result	Opposition Result	Rank
Namig Abdullayev	54 kg	Jin (PRK); W 6–0	Liddle (NZL); W 10–0	—N/a	1 Q	Bye	Kardonov (GRE); W 5–3	Henson (USA); W 4–3	1st place, gold medalist(s)
Arif Abdullayev	58 kg	Kuhner (GER); W 8–5	Buslovych (UKR); L 5–7	Berberyan (ARM); L 1–11	3	Did not advance			9
Shamil Afandiyev	63 kg	Fernyák (SVK); W 6–1	Ilhan (AUS); W 10–0	Jang (KOR); L 1–6	2	Did not advance			7
Elshad Allahverdiyev	76 kg	Khinchagov (UZB); L 2–3	du Toit (RSA); W 8–5	—N/a	2	Did not advance			10
Davud Magomedov	97 kg	Bayramukov (KAZ); L 0–3	Morales (CUB); W 3–0	—N/a	2	Did not advance			13
Rajab Ashabaliyev	130 kg	Valiyev (UKR); W 4–0	McCoy (USA); L 0–10	—N/a	2	Did not advance			9

Greco-Roman

Athlete	Event	Elimination pool				Quarterfinals	Semifinals	Final / BM	
Athlete	Event	Opposition Result	Opposition Result	Opposition Result	Rank	Opposition Result	Opposition Result	Opposition Result	Rank
Natig Eyvazov	54 kg	Pellew (NZL); W 10–0	Rivas (CUB); L 1–6	Yıldız (TUR); W 3–0	2	Did not advance			7
Islam Dugushiev	69 kg	Zeidvand (IRI); W 5–0	Lappalainen (FIN); W 1–0	—N/a	1 Q	Nikitin (EST); L 1–4	—N/a	5th place match Son (KOR); L WO	6
Xviça Biçinaşvili	76 kg	Kim (KOR); L 2–3	Avluca (TUR); L 0–3	—N/a	3	Did not advance			16
