= Boxing at the 2000 Summer Olympics – Middleweight =

Boxing competitions

Men's middleweight boxing at the Games of the XXVII Olympiad
- Venue: Sydney Convention and Exhibition Centre
- Date: 18 September to 30 September 2000
- Competitors: 27 from 27 nations

Medalists
1st place, gold medalist(s)		Jorge Gutiérrez	Cuba
2nd place, silver medalist(s)		Gaydarbek Gaydarbekov	Russia
3rd place, bronze medalist(s)		Vugar Alakbarov	Azerbaijan
3rd place, bronze medalist(s)		Zsolt Erdei	Hungary

The men's middleweight boxing competition at the 2000 Olympic Games in Sydney was held from 18 September to 30 September at the Sydney Convention and Exhibition Centre.

== Competition format ==
Like all Olympic boxing events, the competition was a straight single-elimination tournament. This event consisted of 28 boxers who have qualified for the competition through various qualifying tournaments held in 1999 and 2000. The competition began with a preliminary round on 18 September, where the number of competitors was reduced to 16, and concluded with the final on 30 September. As there were fewer than 32 boxers in the competition, a number of boxers received a bye through the preliminary round. Both semi-final losers were awarded bronze medals.

All bouts consisted of four rounds of two minutes each, with one-minute breaks between rounds. Punches scored only if the white area on the front of the glove made full contact with the front of the head or torso of the opponent. Five judges scored each bout; three of the judges had to signal a scoring punch within one second for the punch to score. The winner of the bout was the boxer who scored the most valid punches by the end of the bout.

== Competitors ==
Name	Country
Mohamed Mesbahi	Morocco
Oleksandr Zubrihin	Ukraine
Zsolt Erdei	Hungary
Vladislav Visilter	Kyrgyzstan
Albert Eromosele	Nigeria
Gaydarbek Gaydarbekov	Russia
Utkirbek Haydarov	Uzbekistan
Abudoureheman	China
Paweł Kakietek	Poland
Cleiton Conceicão	Brazil
Jeff Lacy	United States
Jorge Guitiérrez	Cuba
Somchai Chimlum	Thailand
Antonios Giannoulas	Greece
Ottavio Barone	Italy
Donald Orr	Canada
Jitender Kumar	India
Abdelghani Kinzi	Algeria
Adrian Diaconu	Romania
Paul Miller	Australia
Jerson Ravelo	Dominican Republic
Vugar Alakbarov	Azerbaijan
Peter Kariuki Ngumi	Kenya
Im Jung-bin	South Korea
Ramadan Yasser	Egypt
Akın Kuloğlu	Turkey
Mariano Carrera	Argentina

== Results ==
All times are Australian Time (UTC+10)

Round of 32; Monday, September 18, 2000; 13:00 & 19:30
Gaydarbek Gaydarbekov (RUS)	11
Utkirbek Haydarov (UZB)	10
Abudoureheman (CHN)
Paweł Kakietek (POL)	RSC
Cleiton Conceicão (BRA)
Jeff Lacy (USA)	RSC
Jorge Gutiérrez (CUB)	20
Somchai Cimlum (THA)	11
Antonios Giannoulas (GRE)	17
Ottavio Barone (ITA)	10
Donald Orr (CAN)
Jitender Kumar (IND)	RSC
Abdelghani Kinzi (ALG)	9
Adrian Diaconu (ROM)	19
Paul Miller (AUS)	8
Jerson Ravelo (DOM)	7
Vugar Alakbarov (AZE)	12
Peter Kariuki Ngumi (KEN)	3
Im Jeong-bin (KOR)	8
Ramadan Yasser (EGY)	7
Akın Kuloğlu (TUR)	RSC
Mariano Carrera (ARG)

Round of 16; Friday, September 22, 2000; 13:00 & 19:30
Mohamed Mesbahi (MAR)	5
Oleksandr Zubrihin (UKR)	9
Zsolt Erdei (HUN)	RSC
Vladislav Vizilter (KGZ)
Albert Eromosele (NGR)	9
Gaydarbek Gaydarbekov (RUS)	15
Paweł Kakietek (POL)	7
Jeff Lacy (USA)	21
Jorge Gutiérrez (CUB)	20
Antonios Giannoulas (GRE)	7
Jitender Kumar (IND)	3
Adrian Diaconu (ROM)	12
Paul Miller (AUS)	8
Vugar Alakbarov (AZE)	9
Im Jung-Bin (KOR)	RET
Akın Kuloğlu (TUR)

Quarter-finals; Tuesday, September 26, 2000; 13:00 & 19:30
Oleksandr Zubrihin (UKR)	9
Zsolt Erdei (HUN)	14
Gaydarbek Gaydarbekov (RUS)	RSC
Jeff Lacy (USA)
Jorge Gutiérrez (CUB)	KO
Adrian Diaconu (ROM)
Vugar Alakbarov (AZE)	18
Akın Kuloğlu (TUR)	8

Semi-finals; Thursday, September 28, 2000; 19:30
Zsolt Erdei (HUN)	16
Gaydarbek Gaydarbekov (RUS)	24
Jorge Gutiérrez (CUB)	19
Vugar Alakbarov (AZE)	9

Final; Saturday, September 30, 2000; 13:00
Gaydarbek Gaydarbekov (RUS)	15
Jorge Gutiérrez (CUB)	17
