= Volodymyr Kolesnyk =

Ukrainian boxer (born 1976)

Volodymyr Kolesnyk Володимир Колесник
Personal information
- Nationality: Ukrainian
- Born: January 16, 1976 (age 50) Kolomyia, Ivano-Frankivsk, Ukrainian SSR, Soviet Union
- Height: 1.76 m (5 ft 9 in)
- Weight: Lightweight

Boxing career
- Stance: Orthodox
Medal record
Representing Ukraine
Men's amateur boxing
World Championships
Silver medal – second place	2001 Belfast	Lightweight
Goodwill Games
Bronze medal – third place	2001 Brisbane	Lightweight

Volodymyr Kolesnyk (Ukrainian: Володимир Колесник; born 16 January 1976), also known as Vladimir Kolesnik, is a Ukrainian former amateur boxer, who competed from 1994 to 2001. As an amateur he won a silver medal at the 2001 World Championships, and consecutive bronze at the 2001 Goodwill Games; all in the lightweight division.

== Biography ==
Volodymyr Kolesnyk was born in Kolomyia, Ivano-Frankivsk Oblast and studied at the lyceum No.1 named after Vasyl Stefanyk in Kolomyia.

He gratulated the Vasyl Stefanyk Precarpathian National University.

After his amateur boxing career he heads the Sports Department of the Kolomyia City Council.

== Amateur career ==
Kolesnyk won a silver medal at the 2001 World Amateur Boxing Championships as a lightweight:

- Defeated Noel Monteith (United Kingdom) 12–6
- Defeated Robert Maczik (Hungary) 15–12
- Defeated Vidas Biciulaitis (Lithuania) 28–19
- Defeated Filip Palic (Croatia) RSCO 3
- Lost to Mario Kindelan (Cuba) 15–29

Kolesnyk won a bronze medal at the 2001 Goodwill Games as a lightweight:

- Defeated Mario Kindelan (Cuba) 12–6
- Lost to Selcuk Aydin (Türkiye) 7–16

Kolesnyk won a gold medal at the 1996 Copenhagen Cup as a lightweight:

- Defeated Robert Osmólski (Poland) 10–1
- Gold Medal match: Defeated Mehmet Erarslan (Denmark) 10–5

Kolesnyk won a gold medal at the 1998 Acropolis Cup as a lightweight:

- Gold Medal match: Defeated Vilmos Balogh (Hungary) 7–4
