= Ronald Siler =

American boxer

Personal information
- Born: April 8, 1980 (age 46) Knoxville, Tennessee, U.S.
Medal record
Men's boxing
Representing the United States
World Championships
Bronze medal – third place	2001 Belfast	Light flyweight
Goodwill Games
Gold medal – first place	2001 Brisbane	Light flyweight

Ronald "Ron" Siler Jr. (born April 8, 1980) is an American former amateur boxer who competed for the United States at the 2004 Olympics. He is now a boxing coach at the Cincinnati Golden Gloves gym.

== Background ==
Siler hails from the Over-the-Rhine neighborhood of Cincinnati, he has nine siblings and as of 2007, six children. He grew up without his mother after she joined the Army when he was an infant and lost contact and at times without his troubled father Ron Sr, too.

Boxing since age 7, stringbean Siler almost quit the sport when he lost his first three bouts. He continued, though, and his hard-punching style won his next 50 fights.

At the age of 14 he was caught selling drugs and became a 10th-grade high school dropout.

== Amateur career ==
At boxing he was successful. Until 2001 he was campaigning as a light flyweight, he won the United States championships in 1998 beating Jose Navarro, 1998 and 1999 he lost five times to his nemesis future world champion Brian Viloria and at the Panam games in the first round to Maikro Romero. He came back to win the National Golden Gloves in 2000, at the Olympic trials however he lost to Nonito Donaire and his brother Glenn Donaire

After Viloiria had turned pro he had his best year in 2001 when won the US championships again and a Bronze medal at the world championships where he lost to Yan Bartelemí At the Goodwill Games he defeated Romanian star Marian Velicu 17-6, in semis and Russian southpaw Sergey Kazakov, 17-9, in the final.

At flyweight he won the National Golden Gloves in 2002, at the World Cup he lost to Somjit Jongjohor.

He repeated the win at the National Golden Gloves in 2003 and won the US championships in 2004.

He qualified for the Olympic Games by ending up in first place at the 1st AIBA American 2004 Olympic Qualifying Tournament in Tijuana, Mexico. At the 2004 Athens Olympics he represented the United States as a Flyweight and lost in the second round to Tulashboy Doniyorov (Uzbekistan) 22-45. Results were:

- Defeated Bradley Hore (Australia) 32-18
- Lost to Tulashboy Doniyorov (Uzbekistan) 22-45

=== Amateur highlights ===
- 1998 United States Amateur Light Flyweight (106 lb) champion
- 2000 National Golden Gloves Light Flyweight (106 lb) champion
- 2001 United States Amateur Light Flyweight (106 lb) champion
- 2002 National Golden Gloves Flyweight (112 lb) champion
- 2003 National Golden Gloves Flyweight (112 lb) champion
- 2004 United States Amateur Flyweight (112 lb) champion

== Pro career ==
Siler made his long-awaited pro debut in January 2010 with a TKO win over Almensor De La Cruz.

== Troubles outside the ring ==
In 2002 he was arrested after he was caught driving a stolen 2000 Chevy Tahoe. While out on bond for that charge, Siler and friends stole equipment from construction workers. When the workers chased them Siler hit 51-year-old Elden Sundberg who just rounded a corner in the back of the head with a hammer. He was convicted for attempted felonious assault. . Despite that, Judge Nadel was set to give Siler probation but the boxer did not show up in court. After pleading guilty (today he claims to be innocent) he spent nine months of the 17-month sentence in a Dayton, Ohio, correctional facility. He had also been stopped multiple times for driving without a license. Hamilton County Common Pleas Court Judge Norbert Nadel placed him on probation in 2003 after national trainer Emanuel Steward vouched for Siler, calling him the top prospect for the 2004 Olympics. "You're getting the chance of a lifetime," Nadel told Siler in January 2003. "I hope you don't screw it up. Based on your past experiences, you're going to screw it up. If you want to throw it away, the onus is on you." He was reluctantly released early to compete for an Olympic medal.

In 2006, he violated his parole and was convicted of a misdemeanor.

In 2007 shortly before his pro debut he was charged with possession of crack cocaine, selling heroin and crack cocaine within 1,000 feet of a school, and trafficking drugs. The charges carry a maximum prison sentence of 13 years.

On October 20, 2008, he was arrested for allegedly assaulting a police officer at the Hamilton County Courthouse in Cincinnati, Ohio. He is accused of becoming belligerent after a police officer tried to stop him from cutting in a security line. He was arrested on charges of assaulting a police officer, resisting arrest and obstruction of official business. Hamilton County Municipal Judge Brad Greenberg set bond at $7,000 and ordered him to return to court on October 22 with a lawyer.

On July 17, 2009, Siler was shot and wounded in the Over-the-Rhine neighborhood of Cincinnati. Siler was one of two men shot and suffered a gunshot wound to the leg.

On January 5, 2011 he was caught dealing/possessing cocaine.

On July 4, 2011, Siler was shot in the arm in Cincinnati's West End neighborhood.
