= Emmanuel Clottey (boxer) =

Ghanaian boxer (born 1974)

Personal information
- Nickname: Sleek
- Nationality: Ghanaian
- Born: April 17, 1974 (age 52) Bukom, Ghana
- Height: 5 ft 8 in (1.73 m)
- Weight: Lightweight; Light-welterweight; Welterweight

Boxing career
- Reach: 68 in (173 cm)
- Stance: Orthodox

Boxing record
- Total fights: 39
- Wins: 29
- Win by KO: 17
- Losses: 10

Emmanuel Clottey (born 17 April 1974) is a Ghanaian former professional boxer who competed from 1995 to 2016. As an amateur, he competed at the 1994 Commonwealth Games.

He's the brother of fringe contender Judas Clottey and former world champion Joshua Clottey.

== Professional career ==
Born in Bukom, Ghana, in August 2007, Emmanuel lost to title contender Victor Ortíz at the Grand Plaza Hotel in Houston, Texas.

In his next fight Clottey was knocked out by Mike Alvarado.

Clottey lost a bid for the WBO Africa welterweight title, losing to Bethuel Ushona.

== See also ==
- Notable boxing families
