= Andreas Kotelnik =

Ukrainian boxer (born 1977)

Andreas Kotelnik Андрій Котельник
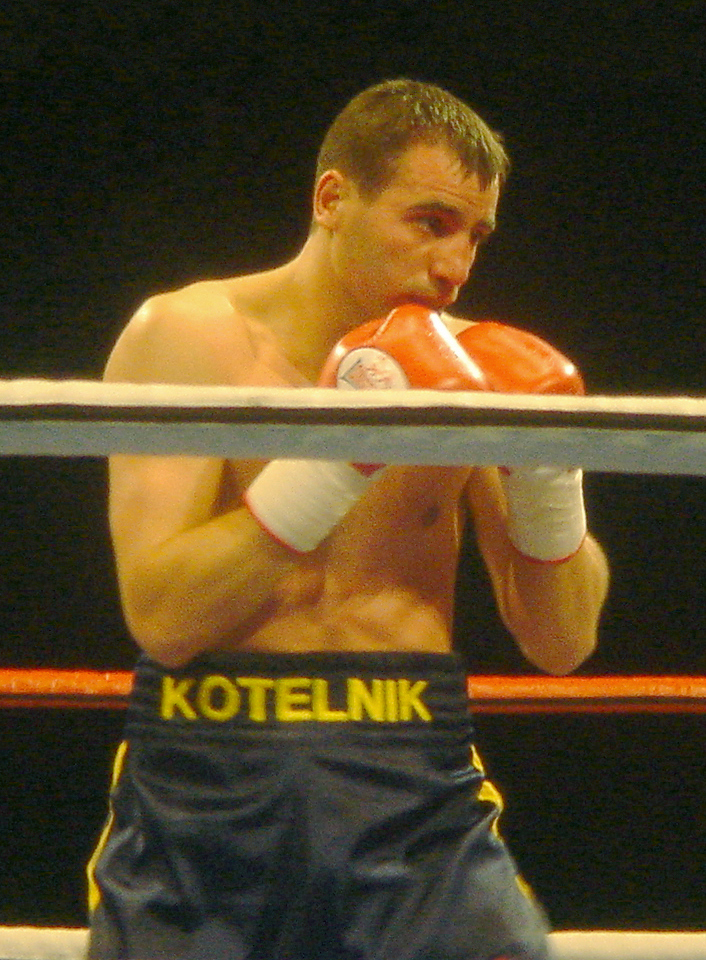
- Kotelnik in 2008

Personal information
- Nickname: Kotelya
- Nationality: Ukrainian
- Born: Andriy Kotelnyk; 29 December 1977 (age 48) Lviv, Ukrainian SSR, Soviet Union
- Height: 1.71 m (5 ft 7 in)
- Weight: Light-welterweight

Boxing career
- Reach: 178 cm (70 in)
- Stance: Orthodox

Boxing record
- Total fights: 37
- Wins: 32
- Win by KO: 13
- Losses: 4
- Draws: 1
Medal record
Men's amateur boxing
Representing Ukraine
Olympic Games
Silver medal – second place	2000 Sydney	Lightweight
Junior European Championships
Gold medal – first place	1995 Siofok	Flyweight

Andriy Mykolayovich Kotelnyk (Ukrainian: Андрій Миколайович Котельник; born 29 December 1977), best known by the Germanicised name Andreas Kotelnik, is a Ukrainian former professional boxer who competed between 2000 and 2014, and held the WBA super-lightweight title from 2008 to 2009. As an amateur boxer, he won a silver medal in the lightweight division at the 2000 Olympics.

== Amateur career ==
- 1995 won the Junior European Championship in Siofok, Hungary as a flyweight
- 1997 competed as a Featherweight at the World Championships in Budapest, Hungary. Results were:
  - Defeated Kenneth Buhlalu (South-Africa) PTS
  - Defeated Roman Rafael (Slovakia) WO
  - Lost to Falk Huste (Germany) PTS
- 2000 won the silver medal as a Lightweight at the Sydney Olympics. Results were:
  - Defeated Larry Semillano (Philippines) RSCO 4
  - Defeated Raymond Narh (Ghana) PTS (17:11)
  - Defeated Nurzhan Karimzhanov (Kazakhstan) RSCO 3
  - Defeated Cristian Bejarano (Mexico) PTS (22:14)
  - Lost to Mario Kindelan (Cuba) PTS (4:14)

== Professional career ==
Kotelnik made his professional debut on 16 December 2000, scoring a first-round knockout against Peter Feher. On 24 January 2003, Kotelnik won his first regional championship—the vacant WBA Inter-Continental light-welterweight title—following a unanimous decision (UD) over Fabrice Colombel. He defended this title twice before a career first loss on 21 October 2004, a split decision (SD) against Souleymane M'baye. On 9 July 2005, Kotelnik challenged European light-welterweight champion Junior Witter, but lost via UD. In his next fight, on 26 November 2005, Kotelnik defeated Muhammad Abdullaev via UD to win back the vacant WBA Inter-Continental light-welterweight title, as well as the vacant WBO Asia Pacific light-welterweight title.

A rematch against M'baye on 30 March 2007, this time with M'baye's WBA light-welterweight world title on the line, ended in a split draw. Almost exactly a year later, on 22 March 2008, Kotelnik won the aforementioned WBA world title—now held by Gavin Rees—by stopping the champion in the twelfth and final round. Two successful defences were made: a UD against Norio Kimura on 13 September 2008, and a close SD against future world champion Marcos Maidana on 7 February 2009. In his third defence, Kotelnik lost the title to Amir Khan after a clear UD. After more than a year of inactivity, he returned on 7 August 2010 to face unified WBC and IBF light-welterweight champion Devon Alexander, but lost a UD which was widely viewed as controversial and a "robbery".

Having spent more than four years out of the sport, Kotelnik had a farewell fight on 4 October 2014, winning a dominant eight-round UD over Alexander Benidze.

== Professional boxing record ==
37 fights	32 wins	4 losses
By knockout	13	0
By decision	19	4
Draws	1	

No.	Result	Record	Opponent	Type	Round, time	Date	Location	Notes
37	Win	32–4–1	Alexander Benidze	UD	8	4 Oct 2014	Arena Lviv, Lviv, Ukraine	
36	Loss	31–4–1	Devon Alexander	UD	12	7 Aug 2010	Scottrade Center, St. Louis, Missouri, US	For WBC and IBF light-welterweight titles
35	Loss	31–3–1	Amir Khan	UD	12	18 Jul 2009	MEN Arena, Manchester, England	Lost WBA light-welterweight title
34	Win	31–2–1	Marcos Maidana	SD	12	7 Feb 2009	StadtHalle, Rostock, Germany	Retained WBA light-welterweight title
33	Win	30–2–1	Norio Kimura	UD	12	13 Sep 2008	Sports Palace "Ukraine", Lviv, Ukraine	Retained WBA light-welterweight title
32	Win	29–2–1	Gavin Rees	TKO	12 (12), 2:34	22 Mar 2008	International Arena, Cardiff, Wales	Won WBA light-welterweight title
31	Win	28–2–1	Laszlo Komjathi	UD	8	16 Jun 2007	SYMA Sports and Conference Centre, Budapest, Hungary	
30	Draw	27–2–1	Souleymane M'baye	SD	12	10 Mar 2007	Liverpool Olympia, Liverpool, England	For WBA light-welterweight title
29	Win	27–2	William González	TKO	8 (12), 2:40	21 Oct 2006	Brandberge Arena, Halle, Germany	Retained WBA Inter-Continental light-welterweight title; Won vacant WBO Inter-Continental light-welterweight title
28	Win	26–2	Richard Reina	UD	12	29 Apr 2006	Hanns-Martin-Schleyer-Halle, Stuttgart, Germany	Retained WBA Inter-Continental and WBO Asia Pacific light-welterweight titles
27	Win	25–2	Muhammad Abdullaev	UD	12	26 Nov 2005	Wilhelm Dopatka Halle, Leverkusen, Germany	Won vacant WBA Inter-Continental and WBO Asia Pacific light-welterweight titles
26	Loss	24–2	Junior Witter	UD	12	9 Jul 2005	National Ice Centre, Nottingham, England	For European light-welterweight title
25	Win	24–1	Marcelo Gonzalo Saucedo	UD	8	15 Feb 2005	Alte Reithalle, Stuttgart, Germany	
24	Loss	23–1	Souleymane M'baye	SD	12	21 Oct 2004	Palais des sports Marcel-Cerdan, Levallois-Perret, France	
23	Win	23–0	Gabriel Mapouka	UD	12	22 Jun 2004	Das SportZentrum, Telfs, Austria	Retained WBA Inter-Continental light-welterweight title
22	Win	22–0	Sayan Sanchat	UD	8	30 Mar 2004	Saaltheater Geulen, Aachen, Germany	
21	Win	21–0	Juan Alberto Godoy	UD	8	31 Jan 2004	Poliedro, Caracas, Venezuela	
20	Win	20–0	Andrey Devyataykin	UD	6	13 Dec 2003	Hala Okrąglak, Opole, Poland	
19	Win	19–0	Arturo Urena	TKO	10 (10)	23 Sep 2003	Universum Gym, Hamburg, Germany	
18	Win	18–0	Vasile Herteg	KO	8 (8)	6 Sep 2003	Újszeged Sports Hall, Szeged, Hungary	
17	Win	17–0	Zimisele Mpusula	TKO	3 (12)	31 May 2003	State Circus, Lviv, Ukraine	Retained WBA Inter-Continental light-welterweight title
16	Win	16–0	Virgil Meleg	UD	8	26 Apr 2003	Sport- und Kongresshalle, Schwerin, Germany	
15	Win	15–0	Fabrice Colombel	UD	12	24 Jan 2003	State Circus, Lviv, Ukraine	Won vacant WBA Inter-Continental light-welterweight title
14	Win	14–0	Matthews Zulu	UD	8	21 Dec 2002	Lausitz-Arena, Cottbus, Germany	
13	Win	13–0	Ferenc Szakallas	TKO	2 (6)	7 Sep 2002	Sport- und Kongresshalle, Schwerin, Germany	
12	Win	12–0	Tomas Besc	TKO	2 (6), 2:42	7 Sep 2002	Berlin, Germany	
11	Win	11–0	Patrik Prokopecz	TKO	3	17 Aug 2002	Estrel Hotel, Berlin, Germany	
10	Win	10–0	Manuel Gomes	TKO	6 (6)	6 Apr 2002	Universum Gym, Hamburg, Germany	
9	Win	9–0	Vladimir Varhegyi	TKO	2 (8)	5 Jan 2002	Bördelandhalle, Magdeburg, Germany	
8	Win	8–0	Anton Vontszemu	PTS	4	3 Nov 2001	Hansehalle, Lübeck, Germany	
7	Win	7–0	Wilson Acuna	TKO	2 (4)	23 Sep 2001	Festzelt, Hattersheim am Main, Germany	
6	Win	6–0	Abdelilah Benabbou	KO	1	28 Jul 2001	Estrel Hotel, Berlin, Germany	
5	Win	5–0	Florin Oanea	PTS	6	16 Jun 2001	Kisstadion, Budapest, Hungary	
4	Win	4–0	Pascal Montulet	PTS	4	7 Apr 2001	Universum Gym, Hamburg, Germany	
3	Win	3–0	Jozef Kubovsky	PTS	4	24 Mar 2001	Rudi-Sedlmayer-Halle, Munich, Germany	
2	Win	2–0	Oganes Ovsepyan	PTS	4	10 Feb 2001	Estrel Hotel, Berlin, Germany	
1	Win	1–0	Peter Feher	KO	1 (4)	16 Dec 2000	Grugahalle, Essen, Germany	

Sporting positions
Regional boxing titles
Vacant Title last held by Souleymane M'baye	WBA Inter-Continental light-welterweight champion 24 January 2003 – October 2004; Vacated	Vacant Title next held by Himself
Vacant Title last held by Himself	WBA Inter-Continental light-welterweight champion 26 November 2005 – 10 March 2007; Lost bid for world title	Vacant Title next held by Giorgio Marinelli
Vacant Title last held by Naoufel Ben Rabah	WBO Asia Pacific light-welterweight champion 26 November 2005 – 21 October 2006; Won Inter-Continental title	Vacant Title next held by Sergey Sorokin
Vacant Title last held by Willy Blain	WBO Inter-Continental light-welterweight champion 21 October 2006 – December 2006; Vacated	Vacant Title next held by Willy Blain
World boxing titles
Preceded by Gavin Rees	WBA light-welterweight champion 10 March 2007 – 18 July 2009	Succeeded by Amir Khan
