= Boxing at the 1998 Asian Games – Men's 71 kg =

Boxing competitions

Men's 71 kg at the 1998 Asian Games
- Venue: Land Sports Complex
- Date: 9–18 December 1998
- Competitors: 9 from 9 nations

Medalists
gold medal	Yermakhan Ibraimov	Kazakhstan
silver medal	Im Jung-bin	South Korea
bronze medal	Komgrit Nanakon	Thailand
bronze medal	Batmönkhiin Enkhbayar	Mongolia

The men's light middleweight boxing competition at the 1998 Asian Games in Bangkok, Thailand was held from 9 to 18 December at the Land Sports Complex.

Like all Asian Games boxing events, the competition was a straight single-elimination tournament. This event consisted of 9 boxers. The competition began with a single bout on 9 December, where the number of competitors was reduced to 8, and concluded with the final on 18 December. As there were fewer than 16 boxers in the competition, a number of boxers received a bye through the preliminary round. Both semi-final losers were awarded bronze medals.

All bouts consisted of five three-minute rounds. The boxers receive points for every successful punch they land on their opponent's head or upper body. The boxer with the most points at the end of the bouts wins. If a boxer is knocked to the ground and cannot get up before the referee counts to 10 then the bout is over and the opponent wins.

== Schedule ==
All times are Indochina Time (UTC+07:00)

Date	Time	Event
Wednesday, 9 December 1998	14:00	Round of 16
Sunday, 13 December 1998	14:00	Quarterfinals
Tuesday, 15 December 1998	14:00	Semifinals
Friday, 18 December 1998	14:00	Final

== Results ==
Legend

- RSCH — Won by referee stop contest head blow

Round of 16
Takayuki Fukuda (JPN)	25
Wang Chung-yuan (TPE)	12

Quarterfinals
Yermakhan Ibraimov (KAZ)	11
Ikrom Berdiev (UZB)	6
Komgrit Nanakon (THA)	13
Esfandiar Mohammadi (IRI)	7
Im Jung-bin (KOR)	17
Nurbek Kasenov (KGZ)	8
Batmönkhiin Enkhbayar (MGL)	16
Takayuki Fukuda (JPN)	9

Semifinals
Yermakhan Ibraimov (KAZ)	RSCH
Komgrit Nanakon (THA)
Im Jung-bin (KOR)	RSCH
Batmönkhiin Enkhbayar (MGL)

Final
Yermakhan Ibraimov (KAZ)	9
Im Jung-bin (KOR)	2
