= Serhiy Danylchenko =

Retired Ukrainian boxer

Personal information
- Full name: Сергій Данильченко
- Nationality: Ukraine
- Born: April 27, 1974 (age 52) Kharkiv, Ukrainian SSR, Soviet Union
- Height: 1.62 m (5 ft 4 in)
- Weight: 54 kg (119 lb)

Sport
- Sport: Boxing
- Weight class: Bantamweight
Medal record
Olympic Games
Bronze medal – third place	2000 Sydney	Bantamweight
World Amateur Championships
Bronze medal – third place	2001 Belfast	Bantamweight
European Amateur Championships
Gold medal – first place	1998 Minsk	Bantamweight
Goodwill Games
Silver medal – second place	2001 Brisbane	Bantamweight

Serhiy Danylchenko (Ukrainian: Сергій Данильченко; born April 27, 1974, in Kharkiv) is a retired Ukrainian boxer, who won a Bantamweight Bronze medal at the 2000 Summer Olympics. On the way to his bronze medal, Danylchenko got a 1st round bye, and defeated India's Dingko Singh and Australia's Justin Kane, before losing in the semifinal against Russia's Raimkul Malakhbekov.

A year later, at the 2001 World Amateur Boxing Championships, he won the bronze medal in the same division.

== Olympic results ==
- 1st round bye
- Defeated Dingko Singh (India) 14–5
- Defeated Justin Kane (Australia) RSC 4
- Lost to Raimkul Malakhbekov (Russia) 10–15

== Pro career ==
Danylchenko began his professional career in 2002 and only fought once, retiring with a pro record of 1–0–0.
