= Pedro Carrión =

Cuban boxer

Medal record

Men's boxing

Representing Cuba

World Amateur Championships
Silver medal – second place	2003 Bangkok	Super Heavyweight
Bronze medal – third place	2001 Belfast	Super Heavyweight

Goodwill Games
Bronze medal – third place	2001 Brisbane	Super Heavyweight

Pedro Carrión Sago (born August 24, 1971) is a Cuban former professional boxer. He is best known for winning several medals in international amateur competitions at super heavyweight.

== Amateur ==
At the 2001 World Amateur Boxing Championships he beat Jason Estrada, but lost to Alexei Mazikin. At the 2003 World Amateur Boxing Championships he defeated Sebastian Köber but lost a war with Alexander Povetkin in the final.

=== Amateur Highlights ===
- 1994 won the gold medal at the Junior World Championships in Istanbul at Superheavyweight.
- 2001 won a bronze medal at the World Championships in Belfast at Superheavyweight. Results were:
  - Defeated Jason Estrada (USA) RSCO–3
  - Lost to Alexey Mazikin (Ukraine) PTS (20–26)
- 2001 3rd place at the Goodwill Games in Brisbane. Results were:
  - Lost to Rustam Saidov (Uzbekistan) PTS (15–23) (Semifinals)
  - Defeated Alexey Mazikin (Ukraine) PTS (14–10) (Third place Bout)
- 2003 won the silver medal at the World Championships in Bangkok at Superheavyweight. Results were:
  - Defeated Ali Mansour (Lebanon) RSCO–4
  - Defeated Oleg Kryzhanovsky (Belarus) RSC–2
  - Defeated Sebastian Kober (Germany) PTS (26–18)
  - Lost to Alexander Povetkin (Russia) PTS (27–29)

== Professional career ==
He turned professional in 2006 at the advanced age of 34 in Germany. His career lasted until 2009, with a record of 8–1–1.
