= Anthony Thompson (boxer) =

American boxer

Personal information
- Nickname: The Messenger
- Nationality: (United States) American
- Born: Anthony Tyrone Thompson; August 17, 1981 (age 44) Philadelphia, Pennsylvania
- Height: 5 ft 11 in (180 cm)
- Weight: Junior middleweight

Boxing career
- Stance: Orthodox

Boxing record
- Total fights: 27
- Wins: 24
- Win by KO: 18
- Losses: 3
- Draws: 0
- No contests: 0

Anthony Thompson
Medal record

Representing United States

Men's Boxing

World Amateur Championships
Silver medal – second place	2001 Belfast	Welterweight

Goodwill Games
Silver medal – second place	2001 Brisbane	Welterweight

Anthony Tyrone Thompson (born August 17, 1981,) is a boxer in the Junior middleweight division.

As of July 2009, Thompson has a record of 24 victories, 18 by knockout, with three defeats.

In October 2025, Anthony started a boxing podcast under the name of Putchagloveson, also known as PGO, alongside his older brother Tyonn, better known as Y-weezy.

== Career ==
=== Amateur career ===
Thompson had an outstanding amateur career, and was the 2000 National Golden Gloves Welterweight Champion. In addition, he was 2001 United States Amateur champion. Thompson was also the runner-up at 2001 World Championship in Belfast, Northern Ireland, losing to Lorenzo Aragon of Cuba. In 2000 Anthony also won the USA National Championships and the National (PAL) Police Athletic League Championship one of few boxers to ever win the triple crown of amateur boxing in the same year. Anthony repeated as USA National Champion in 2001.

=== Professional career ===
Thompson turned pro in 2002 and was quickly thought to be a future champion, but his career hit a snag with a TKO loss to future The Contender star Grady Brewer in 2004. Since the loss he has run off several wins against limited opposition, including a win over seasoned veteran Robert Frazier, and he may currently be positioning himself for a shot at a major contender.

Yuri Foreman defeated Thompson on June 9, 2007, in a tactical 10-round junior middleweight split decision in Madison Square Garden on the undercard of the Miguel Cotto/Zab Judah fight. The scores were 97-93 and 96-94 for Foreman, and 96-94 for Thompson. Representatives for Germany-based 154-pound titlist Sergei Dzindziruk were in the house to scout the fight, with the intention of offering a title shot to the winner.

On August 15, 2008, Thompson lost by technical knockout in the sixth round to Ishmail Arvin in Washington D.C. Thompson suffered a deep wound over his left eye in the third round from an unintentional headbutt, but knocked Arvin down twice in the same round. Thompson continued to dominate the bout, but it was eventually stopped by the referee after round six due to Thompson's cut. There was confusion after the bout, however, and instead of going to the scorecards for a technical decision. The referee did not want Thompson to continue. However Thompson did not show any signs of slowing down and the bout should have been ruled as technical draw. After the decision he told the referee he ruined his career.
