= Mario Kindelán =

Cuban boxer (born 1971)

Personal information
- Born: Mario César Kindelán Mesa; August 10, 1971 (age 55) Holguín, Cuba
- Height: 5 ft 4 1/2 in (164 cm)
- Weight: Lightweight

Boxing career
- Stance: Southpaw
Medal record
Men's amateur boxing
Representing Cuba
Event	1st	2nd	3rd
Olympic Games	2	0	0
World Championships	3	0	0
World Cup	3	0	0
Pan American Games	2	0	0
Central American and Caribbean Games	2	0	0
Goodwill Games	2	0	0
Total	14	0	0
Olympic Games
Gold medal – first place	2000 Sydney	Lightweight
Gold medal – first place	2004 Athens	Lightweight
World Championships
Gold medal – first place	1999 Houston	Lightweight
Gold medal – first place	2001 Belfast	Lightweight
Gold medal – first place	2003 Bangkok	Lightweight
Pan American Games
Gold medal – first place	1999 Winnipeg	Lightweight
Gold medal – first place	2003 Santo Domingo	Lightweight
Central American and Caribbean Games
Gold medal – first place	1993 Ponce	Lightweight
Gold medal – first place	1998 Maracaibo	Lightweight
Goodwill Games
Gold medal – first place	1998 New York	Lightweight
Gold medal – first place	2001 Brisbane	Lightweight

Mario César Kindelán Mesa (born August 10, 1971), best known as Mario Kindelán, is a Cuban former amateur boxer. He is a two-time Olympic gold medalist, having competed in the lightweight division at the 2000 and 2004 events and defeated world champion boxer Amir Khan to win Olympic gold in 2004. His cousin is baseball player Orestes Kindelán.

== Success ==
His most successful period came in a winning streak starting with the 1999 Pan American Games title, and covered every major event he entered including the 2000 Summer Olympics in Sydney, three world championships (1999, 2001, 2003), and the 2003 Pan American Games. His most recent victory was at the 2004 Summer Olympics in Athens, defeating Amir Khan in the final, and retaining his gold medal from four years earlier.

Kindelan holds wins over future professional world champions Felix Trinidad, Miguel Cotto, Amir Khan and Andreas Kotelnik. Kindelan also beat fellow Olympic champions Somluck Kamsing and Felix Diaz.

Prior to the Olympics in 2004 Kindelan had beaten Khan 33–13 at the pre-tournament as well as beating him at the Olympics 30–22.

Mario Kindelan's amateur record was 358–22, having not lost since 1999 till his retirement in 2004.

== Amateur highlights ==
- 1998 World Cup Champion
- 1999 Pan-American Games Champion
- 1999 World Champion
- 2000 Olympic Gold Medalist
- 2001 World Champion
- 2003 World Champion
- 2003 Pan-American Games Champion
- 2004 Olympic Gold Medalist

In 1999, he was named as one of the top ten athletes in Cuba, and was named Boxer of the Year.

=== 2000 Olympic Games ===
- 1st round bye
- Defeated Pongsith Wiangwiset (Thailand) 14–8
- Defeated Tigran Ouzlian (Greece) RSC 4
- Defeated Alexandr Maletin (Russia) 27–15
- Defeated Andreas Kotelnik (Ukraine) 14–4 in the Gold Medal match.

=== 2004 Athens Olympic Games ===
Kindelan's results in the games, were as follows:

- Round of 32: Defeated Ahmed Sadiq of Nigeria (RSC-3)
- Round of 16: Defeated Asghar Ali Shah of Pakistan (24–9)
- Quarterfinals: Defeated Rovshan Huseynov of Azerbaijan (23–11)
- Semifinals: Defeated Murat Khrachev of Russia (20–10)
- Gold Medal match: Defeated Amir Khan of Great Britain (30–22)

=== World Amateur Championships ===
1999 in Houston, United States (as a lightweight)

- Defeated Mahlon Kerwick (United States) 10–4
- Defeated Temur Suleymanov (Uzbekistan) 3–2
- Defeated Pongsith Wiangwiset (Thailand) 8–2
- Defeated Gheorghe Lungu (Romania) 9–4
- Defeated Aleksei Stepanov (Russia) 10–3

2001 in Belfast, Northern Ireland (as a lightweight)

- Defeated Donier Khatamov (Tajikistan) RSC-OS 2
- Defeated Martin Kristjansen (Denmark) RSC-OS 3
- Defeated Patrick Bogere (Sweden) RSC-OS 2
- Defeated Alexandr Maletin (Russia) RSC-OS 3
- Defeated Vladimir Kolesnik (Ukraine) 29–15

2003 in Bangkok, Thailand (as a lightweight)

- Defeated Boris Georgiev (Bulgaria) RSCH 4
- Defeated Stephen Burke (England) RSC-OS 3
- Defeated Jong Sub-Baik (South Korea) 30–14
- Defeated Gyula Kate (Hungary) 24–12
- Defeated Pichai Sayotha (Thailand) 45-27

== Retirement ==
In May 2005, aged 34, he came out of retirement and travelled to Bolton, England for a third fight with Amir Khan. He had beaten Khan twice already the previous year – in the Pre-Olympic tournament and the Olympic Lightweight final – however Khan had become a popular attraction in the UK and a third fight was arranged to set up his professional debut. Khan beat Kindelan on points 19–13.

Having retired, he is generally considered one of the greatest amateur boxers ever seen, leading to the comment during his final fight by the boxing commentator that he was "a professional in a vest".

Typical for athletes from Cuba, where professional sport is prohibited, his reward is his pride in representing his people on the Olympic stage. He said, of being offered $1 million to compete professionally, "I thanked them, but money cannot buy what I have."
