= Jorge Gutiérrez (boxer) =

Cuban boxer (born 1975)

Personal information
- Full name: Jorge Gutiérrez Espinosa
- Nickname: El Guajito
- Nationality: Cuba
- Born: September 18, 1975 (age 51) Camagüey
- Height: 1.80 m (5 ft 11 in)
- Weight: 71 kg (157 lb)

Sport
- Sport: Boxing
- Weight class: Middleweight
Medal record
Olympic Games
Gold medal – first place	2000 Sydney	Middleweight
World Amateur Championships
Silver medal – second place	1999 Houston	Light Middleweight
Pan American Games
Gold medal – first place	1999 Winnipeg	Light Middleweight

Jorge Gutiérrez Espinosa (born 18 September 1975, in Camagüey) is a former boxer from Cuba. He won the Middleweight Gold medal at the 2000 Summer Olympics.

Gutiérrez's Olympic results were:

- Defeated Somchai Chimlum (Thailand) 20–11
- Defeated Antonios Giannoulas (Greece) 20–7
- Defeated Adrian Diaconu (Romania) KO 1
- Defeated Vugar Alekperov (Azerbaijan) 19–9
- Defeated Gaydarbek Gaydarbekov (Russia) 17–15

He was technically too old to compete in the 1994 World Junior Championship. He was 19 years old, born in 1975 (the limit was 1976). He competed anyway and won the gold medal.

== Amateur highlights ==
- 1994 World Junior champion at 71 kg
- 1998 World cup champion at 75 kg
- 1999 Pan American Games champion at 71 kg
- 1999 World Championship Silver medalist, losing by WO to Marian Simion (ROM)
