= Víctor Ramos =

Víctor Ramos may refer to:

- Víctor Alberto Ramos (born 1945), Argentine geologist
- Víctor Ramos (footballer, born 1958), Argentine football striker
- Victor Ramos (boxer) (born 1970), retired East Timorese boxer
- Victor Ramos (footballer, born 1989), Brazilian football centre-back
