= Harriet Bruce-Annan =

Ghanaian programmer and humanitarian

- Born: Grace Akosua Dansowaa Ani-Agyei; 19 December 1965 (age 60); Accra, Ghana
- Occupations: Programmer, humanitarian

Harriet Dansowaa Bruce-Annan (born as Grace Akosua Dansowaa Ani-Agyei on 19 December 1965) is a Ghanaian programmer and humanitarian living in Düsseldorf, Germany. She has become known as the founder of African Angel, a charity organisation which supports and provides training for children from the slums of Accra's Bukom district.

== Life and work ==
Bruce-Annan was born in Accra on 19 December 1965 to Victoria Lankai Lamptey. She spent her childhood in Adabraka and regularly visited her grandmother, who lived in a slum called Bukom. Despite all the suffering prevailing in her community, she still got along in her childhood. With the help of her uncle, she later studied programming in Ghana. Her first job was with a German computer company.

In 1990, Bruce-Annan emigrated with her husband to Germany, after he had promised her a better education in Europe. She went to Germany as an employee of the British Forces. Upon arrival, they lived in a hotel in Düsseldorf, before moving into an apartment in Oberhausen, Germany. However, following several cases of abuse, she fled to a women's shelter in Düsseldorf. There, she first worked as a nursing assistant, then as a lavatory attendant at the Düsseldorf fair and at the "Goldenes Einhorn" (Golden Unicorn) pub on Ratinger Straße.

While at Düsseldorf, she began collecting money to help orphans in the slums of Bukom in Accra. On 15 September 2002, together with six others, Bruce-Annan founded the African Angel Association. In 2004, she flew from Düsseldorf to Ghana with 5,000 euros to start her African Angel Association. The Association supports children from the Bukom slum, particularly orphans, by financing their education and training.

In 2008, Bruce-Annan was invited to the Berlin Senate conference, where the role of knowledge in international migration was discussed. In 2009, she appeared in on NDR television and on Markus Lanz talk shows. Bruce-Annan has been touring Germany and Austria for several years to present her project.

== Awards ==
On 31 March 2011, she was named the "heroine of everyday life" by the magazine Bild der Frau at a gala in Berlin and was awarded prize money of 30,000 euros.

Bruce-Annan was also awarded the Cross of Merit on the ribbon of the Federal Republic of Germany on the occasion of International Women's Day in March 2013.

== Literature ==
- Beate Rygiert: African Angel: changing the world with 50 cents / Harriet Bruce-Annan. Lübbe publishing house, Bergisch Gladbach 2009, ISBN 978-3-7857-2384-5.
