= Boxing at the 2001 Goodwill Games =

- Location: Brisbane, Queensland, Australia
- Start date: 6 September
- End date: 9 September

The boxing competition at the 2001 Goodwill Games was held in Brisbane, Australia from 6 to 9 September.

== Medal winners ==
Event	Gold	Silver	Bronze
Light Flyweight (– 48 kilograms)	Ronald Siler; United States	Sergei Kazakov; Russia	Yuriolkis Gamboa; Cuba
Flyweight (– 51 kilograms)	Osvaldo Liranza; Cuba	Georgy Balakshin; Russia	Gennadiy Ozarinski; Ukraine
Bantamweight (– 54 kilograms)	Guillermo Rigondeaux; Cuba	Serhiy Danylchenko; Ukraine	Afanasi Poskachin; Russia
Featherweight (– 57 kilograms)	Rencise Perez; Cuba	Majid Jelili; Sweden	Sergei Pulkevich; Russia
Lightweight (– 60 kilograms)	Mario Kindelán; Cuba	Aleksei Stepanov; Russia	Volodymyr Kolesnyk; Ukraine
Light Welterweight (– 63,5 kilograms)	Estonio Gutierrez; Cuba	Aidin Gasanov; Russia	Yuriy Solotov; Ukraine
Welterweight (– 67 kilograms)	Yudel Jhonson; Cuba	Anthony Thompson; United States	Danny Geale; Australia
Light Middleweight (– 71 kilograms)	Damián Austín; Cuba	Marian Simion; Romania	Andrei Balanov; Russia
Middleweight (– 75 kilograms)	Gaydarbek Gaydarbekov; Russia	Paul Miller; Australia	Utkirbek Haydarov; Uzbekistan
Light Heavyweight (– 81 kilograms)	Yosason Martinez; Cuba	Grigore Raco; Romania	Mikhail Gala; Russia
Heavyweight (– 91 kilograms)	Odlanier Solis; Cuba	Yevgeni Arkhipov; Russia	Andreas Gustafsson; Sweden
Super Heavyweight (+ 91 kilograms)	Aleksandr Povetkin; Russia	Rustam Saidov; Uzbekistan	Pedro Carrión; Cuba
