= Bodo Andreass =

German boxing coach

Bodo Andreass (born 21 December 1955 in Eilenburg, Germany) is a German boxing coach who has coached German, Nigerian, South African and Australian national boxing teams.

== Boxing career ==
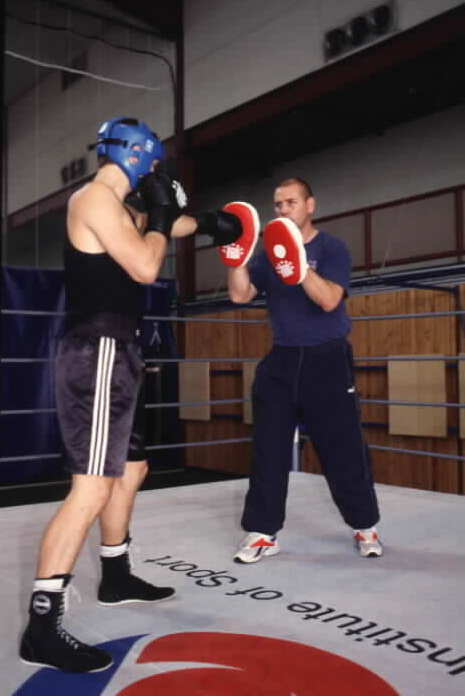
AIS Head Boxing Coach Bodo Andreass (right) sparring with Paul Miller (left)

Andreass boxed from 1964 to 1981 in East Germany. He was a member of the national team from 1974 to 1981 and was the national champion in 1979. He had over 200 amateur bouts.

== Coaching career ==
=== East Germany ===
In 1983, Andreass started his coaching career and was an East German national coach from 1986 to 1990.

=== Nigeria ===
He subsequently took up appointment as the national coach of Nigeria from 1991 to 1994.

Whilst in charge on the Nigerian team, two boxers won silver medals at the 1992 Barcelona Olympics and at the 1994 Commonwealth Games, one boxer won a gold medal and two boxers won silver medals.

=== South Africa ===
He was South African national coach from 1995 to 1997, before being appointed Australian national coach.

=== Australia ===
Andreass was appointed the inaugural Head Coach of the Australian Institute of Sport boxing program in 1997 and held this position until the boxing program ceased in 2010.

Head Coach of Australian Teams:

- Olympic Games - 2000, 2004, 2008, 2012 (Women's Head Coach)
- Commonwealth Games - 1998, 2002, 2006, 2010

Major results of the program whilst Andreass was a Head Coach:

- 1998 - Commonwealth Games - AIS boxers won four bronze medals James Swan, Casey Johns, Justin Whitehead, Lynden Hosking
- 2000 - Sydney Olympic Games - Ten AIS boxers selected from a possible 12 boxers.
- 2002 - Commonwealth Games - AIS boxers won three gold medals - Justin Kane, Daniel Geale, Paul Miller and one bronze - Ben McEachran
- 2004 - Athens Olympic Games - Nine AIS boxers were selected.
- 2006 - Commonwealth Games - AIS boxers won two gold medals - Jarrod Fletcher and Brad Pitt and four bronze medals -Luke Jackson, Leonardo Zappavigna, Ben McEachran and Paul Rudic
- 2008 - Athens Olympic Games - Nine AIS boxers represented Australia.
- 2010 - Commonwealth Games - Ten AIS boxers were selected.
