= Adisu Tebebu =

Ethiopian boxer (born 1980)

Personal information
- Nationality: Ethiopian
- Born: 3 December 1980 (age 44)

Sport
- Sport: Boxing

Adisu Tebebu (born 3 December 1980) is an Ethiopian boxer. He competed in the men's lightweight event at the 2000 Summer Olympics.
