= José Leonardo Cruz =

Colombian boxer (born 1975)

Personal information
- Nationality: Colombian
- Born: 17 December 1975 (age 50) Barranquilla, Colombia

Sport
- Sport: Boxing

José Leonardo Cruz (born 17 December 1975) is a Colombian boxer. He competed in the men's lightweight event at the 2000 Summer Olympics.
