= 2001 World Amateur Boxing Championships =

Boxing competitions

2001 AIBA World Boxing Championships
- Venue: Odyssey Arena
- Location: Belfast, Northern Ireland
- Start date: June 3, 2001
- End date: June 10, 2001

The Men's 2001 World Amateur Boxing Championships were held in Belfast, Northern Ireland, from June 3 to June 10. The competition was organised by the world governing body for amateur boxing International Boxing Association (AIBA).

== Medal winners ==
Event	Gold	Silver	Bronze
Light Flyweight (– 48 kilograms)	Yan Bartelemí; Cuba	Marian Velicu; Romania	Ronald Siler; United States Harry Tañamor; Philippines
Flyweight (– 51 kilograms)	Jérôme Thomas; France	Volodymyr Sydorenko; Ukraine	Alexandar Alexandrov; Bulgaria Georgy Balakshin; Russia
Bantamweight (– 54 kilograms)	Guillermo Rigondeaux; Cuba	Agasi Ağagüloğlu; Turkey	Serhiy Danylchenko; Ukraine Elio Rojas; Dominican Republic
Featherweight (– 57 kilograms)	Ramaz Paliani; Turkey	Galib Jafarov; Kazakhstan	Majid Jelili; Sweden Joni Turunen; Finland
Lightweight (– 60 kilograms)	Mario Kindelán; Cuba	Volodymyr Kolesnyk; Ukraine	Alexandr Maletin; Russia Filip Palić; Croatia
Light Welterweight (– 63,5 kilograms)	Diógenes Luna; Cuba	Dimitar Shtilianov; Bulgaria	Willy Blain; France Yuriy Solotov; Ukraine
Welterweight (– 67 kilograms)	Lorenzo Aragón; Cuba	Anthony Thompson; United States	Sherzod Husanov; Uzbekistan (Republic of Ireland) James Moore; Ireland
Light Middleweight (– 71 kilograms)	Damián Austín; Cuba	Marian Simion; Romania	Ciro Di Corcia; Italy Bülent Ulusoy; Turkey
Middleweight (– 75 kilograms)	Andrey Gogolev; Russia	Utkirbek Haydarov; Uzbekistan	Yordanis Despaigne; Cuba Carl Froch; England
Light Heavyweight (– 81 kilograms)	Yevgeniy Makarenko; Russia	Viktor Perun; Ukraine	John Dovi; France Claudio Rîșco; Romania
Heavyweight (– 91 kilograms)	Odlanier Solis; Cuba	David Haye; England	Sultanachmed Ibragimov; Russia Vyacheslav Uselkov; Ukraine
Super Heavyweight (+ 91 kilograms)	Ruslan Chagaev; Uzbekistan	Oleksiy Mazikin; Ukraine	Vitali Boot; Germany Pedro Carrión; Cuba

== Medal table ==
Rank	Nation	Gold	Silver	Bronze	Total
1	Cuba (CUB)	7	0	2	9
2	Russia (RUS)	2	0	3	5
3	Turkey (TUR)	1	1	1	3
3	Uzbekistan (UZB)	1	1	1	3
5	France (FRA)	1	0	2	3
6	Ukraine (UKR)	0	4	3	7
7	Romania (ROU)	0	2	1	3
8	Bulgaria (BUL)	0	1	1	2
8	England (ENG)	0	1	1	2
8	United States (USA)	0	1	1	2
11	Kazakhstan (KAZ)	0	1	0	1
12	Croatia (CRO)	0	0	1	1
12	Dominican Republic (DOM)	0	0	1	1
12	Finland (FIN)	0	0	1	1
12	Germany (GER)	0	0	1	1
12	Ireland (IRL)	0	0	1	1
12	Italy (ITA)	0	0	1	1
12	Philippines (PHI)	0	0	1	1
12	Sweden (SWE)	0	0	1	1
Totals (19 entries)		12	12	24	48
