= Donald Orr =

Canadian boxer

Personal information
- Nationality: Canadian
- Born: 9 March 1977 (age 48); Surrey, British Columbia, Canada

Sport
- Sport: Boxing

Donald Orr (born 9 March 1977) is a Canadian boxer. He competed in the men's middleweight event at the 2000 Summer Olympics.
