= Ray Narh =

Ghanaian boxer

Personal information
- Nickname: Sugar Ray
- Nationality: Ghanaian
- Born: Raymond Akwete Narh; 21 July 1978 (age 48) Accra, Ghana
- Height: 6 ft 0 in (183 cm)
- Weight: Lightweight; Light welterweight; Welterweight

Boxing career
- Reach: 71 in (180 cm)
- Stance: Orthodox

Boxing record
- Total fights: 32
- Wins: 26
- Win by KO: 21
- Losses: 6

Raymond Akwete "Ray" Narh (born 21 July 1978) is a Ghanaian former professional boxer who competed from 2001 to 2014. He is a former WBC–USNBC light welterweight champion. As an amateur, Narh represented Ghana at the 2000 Olympics, reaching the second round of the lightweight bracket before losing to Andreas Kotelnik.

== Amateur career ==
Narh was a gold medallist in the lightweight category at the 1998 Commonwealth Games. He was also a member of the 2000 Ghanaian Summer Olympic team and his cousin Ben Neequaye was also a member of the team. At Sydney, Australia he beat Victor Ramos but then lost to the silver medalist and future WBA Light Welterweight Champion Andriy Kotelnik.

== Professional boxing career ==
Narh's only loss was to a then undefeated Kid Diamond.

=== NABC lightweight champion ===
He then beat Jadschi Green to win the North American Boxing Council Lightweight Championship; the bout was held at Heinz Field in Pittsburgh, Pennsylvania.

In March 2011, Narh beat Freddie Norwood to retain his WBC USNBC Light Welterweight Championship.

On May 7, 2011, Narh lost to undefeated Mexican-American Mike Alvarado, with the WBC Continental Americas Light Welterweight Championship on the line. This bout was on Showtime's televised portion of the Pacquiao vs. Mosley undercard.

== Professional boxing record ==
25 Wins (21 knockouts), 2 Losses, 0 Draw
Res.	Record	Opponent	Type	Rd., Time	Date	Location	Notes
Loss	25-2	Mike Alvarado	TKO	3 (3:00)	May 7, 2011	MGM Grand, Paradise, Nevada, U.S.	For the WBC Continental Americas Light Welterweight title
Win	25-1	Freddie Norwood	UD	10 (10)	March 4, 2011	Jostens Center, Lake Buena Vista, Florida, U.S.	Retained his WBC USNBC title
