= Abdel Jebahi =

French boxer

Personal information
- Nationality: French
- Born: 21 August 1975 (age 49); Vienne-en-Arthies, France

Sport
- Sport: Boxing

Abdel Jebahi (born 21 August 1975) is a French boxer. He competed in the men's lightweight event at the 2000 Summer Olympics.
