= Paweł Kakietek =

Polish boxer (1975–2026)

Personal information
- Nationality: Polish
- Born: 2 July 1975 Milanówek, Poland
- Died: November 2026 (aged 51)

Sport
- Sport: Boxing

Paweł Kakietek (2 July 1975 – November 2026) was a Polish boxer. He competed in the men's middleweight event at the 2000 Summer Olympics achieving a shared ninth-place finish in the tournament.

Kakietek competed for Gwardia Warszawa sports club in Warsaw, earning multiple Polish championship titles. Over his boxing career, he participated in 182 matches, achieving 143 victories.

Kakietek died in November 2026, at the age of 51.
