= Karim Mayfield =

American boxer

Personal information
- Nickname: Hard Hitta
- Born: Karim Rasheed Mayfield; December 14, 1980 (age 45) San Francisco, California, U.S.
- Height: 5 ft 7 in (170 cm)
- Weight: Light welterweight Welterweight

Boxing career
- Reach: 66 in (168 cm)
- Stance: Orthodox

Boxing record
- Total fights: 27
- Wins: 21
- Win by KO: 11
- Losses: 5
- Draws: 1

Karim Rasheed Mayfield (born December 14, 1980) is an American professional boxer who fights at welterweight. He is a former NABO junior welterweight champion.

== Early years ==
Mayfield was born and raised in San Francisco and grew up in the historic Fillmore District. He has three brothers and two sisters. His mother is an entrepreneur while his father is an electrician.

== Amateur career ==
Karim Mayfield has fought 58 amateur fights altogether with a record of 54-4. He won the 2006 Golden Gloves in San Francisco at the historic Civic Center Auditorium in San Francisco. Mayfield also won the Bronze medal in the Western Trials for the 2004 Olympics.

Mayfield was a football player, running back, in school and discovered boxing at a relatively late age when he was 20 years old. There was a local gym around his neighborhood that had just opened and he decided to go check it out. Mayfield ended up sparring with an amateur boxer who had been boxing for a year and did extremely well. That inspired and motivated Mayfield to take up Boxing professionally. Mayfield is trained by Ben Bautista.

== Pro career ==
On June 23, 2006 Mayfield beat the veteran Chris Mickle to win his pro debut. This card also had future world champions Robert Guerrero and Andre Dirrell.

Mayfield first won the Vacant NABO Jr. Welterweight on October 1, 2011 in Tunica, Mississippi, via a 10 round unanimous decision against lefthanded former two-time Venezuelan Olympian Patrick Lopez (20-4).

On June 20, 2015 Floyd Mayweather Jr told ESPN Boxing reporter Dan Rafael that he was going to fight either Karim Mayfield or Andre Berto next. Most boxing scribes did not take this seriously, but Mayweather insisted that he was not joking, stating "Pacquiao fought (Chris) Algieri, so why not?"

== Professional boxing record ==
21 Wins (11 knockouts, 10 decisions), 5 Losses (0 knockouts, 5 decisions), 1 Draw
Res.	Record	Opponent	Type	Rd., Time	Date	Location	Notes
Loss	21-5-1	(Russia) Sergey Lubkovich	MD	10	2018-04-27	(United States) KFC Yum! Center, Louisville	
Win	21-4-1	(Japan) Gaku Takahashi	UD	8	2018-04-07	(United States) Fairmont Hotel, San Francisco	
Win	20-4-1	(Mexico) Miguel Dumas	UD	6	2017-10-21	(United States) Armory, San Francisco	
Loss	19-4-1	(Kazakhstan) Bakhtiyar Eyubov	SD	10	2016-08-19	(United States) Rhinos Stadium, Rochester, New York	
Loss	19-3-1	(Russia) Dmitry Mikhaylenko	UD	10	2016-01-30	(Canada) Bell Centre, Montreal	
Win	19-2-1	(United States) Michael Balasi	UD	8	2014-11-08	(United States) Longshoremen's Hall, San Francisco	
Loss	18-2-1	(United States) Emanuel Taylor	UD	10	2014-07-18	(United States) Paramount Theatre, Huntington, New York	
Loss	18-1-1	(Puerto Rico) Thomas Dulorme	UD	10	2014-03-29	(United States) The Ballroom, Boardwalk Hall, Atlantic City, New Jersey	For WBO NABF Welterweight title.
Win	18-0-1	(United States) Christopher Fernandez	KO	8,2:59	2013-09-28	(United States) StubHub Center, Carson, California	
Win	17-0-1	(United States) Mauricio Herrera	UD	10	2012-10-27	(United States) Turning Stone Resort & Casino, Verona, New York	Retained WBO NABO Welterweight title.
Win	16-0-1	(United States) Raymond Serrano	TKO	5,0:47	2012-05-18	(United States) Times Union Center, Albany, New York	Retained WBO NABO Welterweight title.
Win	15-0-1	(Venezuela) Patrick Lopez	UD	10	2011-10-01	(United States) Fitzgerald's Casino & Hotel, Tunica, Mississippi	Won WBO NABO Welterweight title.
Win	14-0-1	(United States) Stevie Forbes	TKO	10,1:03	2011-06-17	(United States) Frank Erwin Center, Austin, Texas	
Win	13-0-1	(United States) Sergio Joel De La Torre	TKO	5,3:00	2010-06-12	(United States) Kezar Pavilion, San Francisco	
Win	12-0-1	(United States) Mario Ramos	MD	6	2010-06-12	(United States) Grand Sierra Resort, Reno, Nevada	
Win	11-0-1	(United States) Francisco Santana	TKO	5,2:27	2009-11-21	(United States) Oracle Arena, Oakland, California	
Win	10-0-1	(United States) Joshua Rentería	UD	6	2009-08-14	(United States) Desert Diamond Casino, Tucson, Arizona	
Win	9-0-1	(Mexico) Roberto Valenzuela	TKO	2,1:12	2009-05-16	(United States) Oracle Arena, Oakland, California	
Win	8-0-1	(Mexico) Mario Alberto Lozano	UD	6	2009-03-07	(United States) HP Pavilion, San Jose, California	
Win	7-0-1	(United States) Trenton Titsworth	UD	4	2008-11-20	(United States) HP Pavilion, San Jose, California	
Win	6-0-1	(United States) Francisco Santana	SD	6	2008-03-20	(United States) HP Pavilion, San Jose, California	
Win	5-0-1	(Azerbaijan) Rahman Yusubov	TKO	2,2:47	2007-10-03	(United States) Sears Centre, Hoffman Estates, Illinois	
Win	4-0-1	(United States) Alejo Sepulveda	TKO	1,2:46	2007-08-06	(United States) Sports Arena, Los Angeles	
Win	3-0-1	(Mexico) Ricardo Galindo	TKO	4,1:56	2007-07-19	(United States) Marriott Hotel, Irvine, California	
Draw	2-0-1	(Mexico) Jorge Alberto Padilla	TD	2,3:00	2007-05-24	(United States) HP Pavilion, San Jose, California	Padilla was cut by an accidental headbutt
Win	2-0-0	(Mexico) Salvador Lopez	TKO	3,2:29	2006-11-16	(United States) HP Pavilion, San Jose, California	
Win	1-0-0	(United States) Chris Mickle	TKO	1,1:00	2006-11-16	(United States) Oakland Arena, Oakland, California	Professional debut
