= Ottavio Barone =

Italian boxer

Personal information
- Nationality: Italian
- Born: 29 September 1974 (age 50); Rome, Italy

Sport
- Sport: Boxing

Ottavio Barone (born 29 September 1974) is an Italian boxer. He competed in the men's middleweight event at the 2000 Summer Olympics.
