= Vladislav Vizilter =

Kyrgyzstani boxer

Personal information
- Nationality: Kyrgyzstani
- Born: 17 August 1979 (age 45)

Sport
- Sport: Boxing

Vladislav Vizilter (born 17 August 1979) is a Kyrgyzstani former boxer. He competed in the men's middleweight event at the 2000 Summer Olympics.
