= Vugar Alakbarov =

Azerbaijani boxer (born 1981)

Vüqar Alakbarov
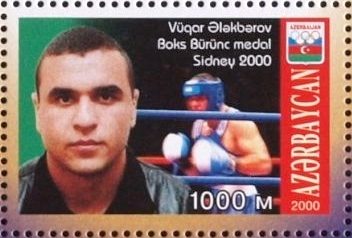
- Alakbarov depicted on an Azerbaijani stamp

Personal information
- Full name: Vüqar Mursal Alakbarov
- Nationality: Azerbaijan
- Born: 5 January 1981 (age 45) Mingachevir, Azerbaijan SSR, Soviet Union
- Height: 1.78 m (5 ft 10 in)
- Weight: 91 kg (201 lb)

Sport
- Sport: Boxing
- Weight class: Middleweight
- Club: Neftchi Petrol, Baku
Medal record
Olympic Games
Bronze medal – third place	2000 Sydney	Middleweight

Vugar Mursal Alakbarov (Azerbaijani: Vüqar Mursal Ələkbərov; born 5 January 1981) is an Azerbaijani boxer.

Alakbarov competed in the middleweight class (−75 kg) at the 2000 Summer Olympics and won the bronze medal. At the 2004 Summer Olympics he was eliminated in the quarter final in the heavyweight class. He qualified for the 2004 Summer Olympics by winning the heavyweight event in the 2nd AIBA European 2004 Olympic Qualifying Tournament in Warsaw, Poland.

== Olympic results ==
2000 (Middleweight)

- Defeated Peter Kariuki Ngumi (Kenya) 12–3
- Defeated Paul Miller (Australia) 9–8
- Defeated Akin Kuloglu (Turkey) 18–8
- Lost to Jorge Gutiérrez (Cuba) 9–19

2004 (Heavyweight)

- Defeated Spyridon Kladouchas (Greece) 18–14
- Lost to Naser Al Shami (Syria) DQ 4 (1:40)
