= Patrick López =

Venezuelan boxer (born 1978)

Personal information
- Full name: Patrick Adelis López Rojas
- Nickname: "El Elegante"
- Nationality: Venezuela
- Born: 17 March 1978 (age 48) Tinaco, Cojedes
- Height: 1.74 m (5 ft 9 in)
- Weight: 64 kg (141 lb)

Sport
- Sport: Boxing
- Weight class: Light Welterweight
Medal record
Pan American Games
Gold medal – first place	2003	Light Welterweight
Bronze medal – third place	1999	Lightweight
Central American and Caribbean Games
Gold medal – first place	2002	Light Welterweight
South American Games
Gold medal – first place	2002	Light Welterweight

Patrick López (born 17 March 1978) is a Venezuelan professional boxer. As an amateur, he competed at the 2000 and 2004 Summer Olympics. He also won gold medals at the Pan American Games, Central American and Caribbean Games and South American Games.

== Amateur career ==
López began fighting at age 10. He is a southpaw who won the 2002 Central American and Caribbean Games and the 2003 Pan American Games.

=== Olympic results ===
He represented his country at two consecutive Summer Olympics, starting in 2000 in Sydney, Australia.

- 2000 Sydney (as a Lightweight)

- Defeated Norman Schuster (Germany) 24-10
- Lost to Alexandr Maletin (Russia) RSC 3

- 2004 Athens (as a Light Welterweight)

- Lost to Michele di Rocco (Italy) 30-37

== Professional career ==
Nicknamed El Elegante, he turned professional on 13 December 2004.

== Professional record ==
21 Wins (13 knockouts, 8 decisions), 6 Losses (2 knockouts, 4 decisions), 0 Draw
Res.	Record	Opponent	Type	Rd., Time	Date	Location	Notes
Win	21-5	(Mexico) Eugenio Lopez	TKO	4,1:15	2012-10-27	Parque Naciones Unidas, Caracas, Venezuela	Won vacant WBA Fedebol light welterweight title
Loss	20-5	(United States) Karim Mayfield	UD	10	2011-10-01	(United States) Fitzgeralds Casino and Hotel, Tunica, Mississippi, U.S.	For vacant WBO NABO welterweight title
Loss	20-4	(United States) Henry Lundy	UD	10	2011-04-01	(United States) Foxwoods Resort, Mashantucket, Connecticut, U.S.	For vacant NABF lightweight title.
Loss	20-3	(United States) Tim Coleman	KO	3,2:13	2010-10-01	(United States) Chumash Casino, Santa Ynez, California, U.S.	For USBA light welterweight title
Win	20-2	(United States) Prenice Brewer	TKO	3,2:38	2010-08-06	(United States) UIC Pavilion, Chicago, Illinois, U.S.	
Win	19-2	(Mexico) Cristian Favela	UD	8	2010-04-23	(United States) Doubletree Hotel, Ontario, California, U.S.	
Win	18-2	(United States) John Brown	UD	8	2010-01-22	(United States) Doubletree Hotel, Ontario, California, U.S.	
Win	17-2	(Mexico) Sergio Rivera	UD	8	2009-11-06	(United States) Doubletree Hotel, Ontario, California, U.S.	
Win	16-2	(United States) Tyler Ziolkowski	KO	1,2:16	2009-09-11	(United States) Doubletree Hotel, Ontario, California, U.S.	
Loss	15-2	(United States) Josesito Lopez	SD	8	2009-04-17	(United States) Doubletree Hotel, Ontario, California, U.S.	
Win	15-1	(Colombia) Jailer Berrio	UD	8	2009-02-27	(United States) Doubletree Hotel, Ontario, California, U.S.	
Win	14-1	(United States) Doel Carrasquillo	UD	6	2008-09-05	(United States) Bally's Event Center, Atlantic City, New Jersey, U.S.	
Win	13-1	(United States) Juaquin Gallardo	UD	10	2008-06-13	(United States) Catholic Youth Center, Scranton, Pennsylvania, U.S.	
Win	12-1	(United States) Jonathan Tubbs	TKO	4,2:04	2008-02-15	(United States) Showboat Hotel & Casino, Atlantic City, New Jersey, U.S.	
Loss	11-1	(Ecuador) Fernando Angulo	UD	10	2007-07-06	(United States) Florida State Fairgrounds Hall, Tampa, Florida, U.S.	
Win	11-0	(Canada) Sebastien Hamel	RTD	2,3:00	2007-04-21	(United States) National Guard Armory, Philadelphia, Pennsylvania, U.S.	
Win	10-0	(Puerto Rico) Jose Badillo	TKO	3,2:24	2007-02-17	Dr. Juan Sanchez Acevedo Coliseum, Moca, Puerto Rico	
Win	9-0	(United States) Agustin Velez	TKO	6,2:54	2006-12-15	(United States) The Castle, Boston, Massachusetts, U.S.	
Win	8-0	(Puerto Rico) Eric Rodriguez	UD	6	2006-11-09	(United States) Wachovia Spectrum, Philadelphia, Pennsylvania, U.S.	
Win	7-0	(Panama) Armando Cordoba	UD	4	2006-06-09	(United States) Tropicana Hotel & Casino, Atlantic City, New Jersey, U.S.	
Win	6-0	(Puerto Rico) Franchie Torres	TKO	6,1:40	2006-03-10	(United States) Civic Center, Kissimmee, Florida, U.S.	
Win	5-0	(Mexico) Christian Lozada	TKO	1,2:46	2006-02-24	(United States) Turning Stone Resort & Casino, Verona, New York, U.S.	
Win	4-0	(Argentina) Diego Villalba	TKO	3,2:36	2005-12-10	(United States) Turning Stone Resort & Casino, Verona, New York, U.S.	
Win	3-0	(United States) Ahmed Curry	TKO	3,1:48	2005-09-24	(United States) Palo Alto Fire Company, Palo Alto, Pennsylvania, U.S.	
Win	2-0	(Colombia) Edwin Mota	TKO	3,2:10	2005-03-05	Estadio Municipal, Coro, Venezuela	
Win	1-0	(Venezuela) Jose Luis Gil Atencio	KO	1	2004-12-13	Centro Recreacional Yesterday, Turmero, Venezuela	
