= Alexander Maletin =

Russian boxer

Medal record

Men's Boxing

Representing Russia

Olympic Games
Bronze medal – third place	2000 Sydney	Lightweight

World Amateur Championships
Gold medal – first place	1997 Budapest	Lightweight
Silver medal – second place	2003 Bangkok	Light Welterweight
Bronze medal – third place	2001 Belfast	Lightweight

European Amateur Championships
Gold medal – first place	2000 Tampere	Lightweight
Gold medal – first place	2002 Perm	Lightweight
Gold medal – first place	2004 Pula	Light Welterweight

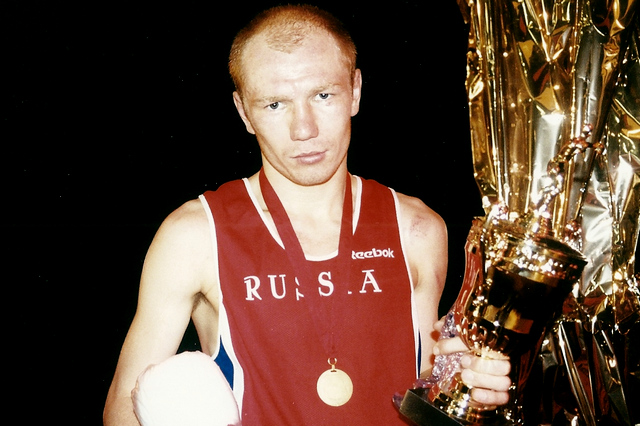

Alexandr Ivanovich Maletin (Russian: Александр Иванович Малетин; born 6 February 1975) is a boxer from Russia best known to win the lightweight world championships 1997.

== Career ==
Maletin won the bronze medal in the lightweight division (– 57 kg) at the 2000 Summer Olympics in Sydney, Australia. He beat Makhach Nuridinov (Azerbaijan) 14–5, Patrick Lopez (Venezuela) RSC 3 and Selim Palyani (Turkey) RSC 4. In the semifinals, he was defeated by eventual gold medalist southpaw Mario Kindelán from Cuba 15–27. In 2002, he became European champion by besting Boris Georgiev.

=== Light Welterweight ===
He beat Manus Boonjumnong 34:16 in 2003 but controversially lost the World championships final 2003 against French southpaw Willy Blain. Maletin also represented his native country at the 2004 Summer Olympics in Athens, Greece, where he defeated Saleh Khoulef (Egypt) RSC 3 (0:10) and lost again to Willy Blain (France) 20–28.

== Olympic results ==
2000

- Defeated Makhach Nuridinov (Azerbaijan) 14-5
- Defeated Patrick Lopez (Venezuela) RSC 3
- Defeated Selim Palyani (Turkey) RSC 4
- Lost to Mario Kindelán (Cuba) 15-27

2004

- Defeated Saleh Khoulef (Egypt) RSC 3 (0:10)
- Lost to Willy Blain (France) 20-28
