= 2000 European Amateur Boxing Championships =

Boxing competitions

- Host city: Tampere
- Country: Finland
- Dates: 13–21 May

The Men's 2000 European Amateur Boxing Championships were held in Tampere, Finland from May 13 to 21. The tournament served as a qualification event for the 2000 Summer Olympics in Sydney, Australia.

== Medal winners ==
Event	Gold	Silver	Bronze
Light Flyweight (– 48 kilograms)	Valeriy Sydorenko; Ukraine	Sergey Kazakov; Russia	Pál Lakatos; Hungary Marian Velicu; Romania
Flyweight (– 51 kilograms)	Vladimir Sidorenko; Ukraine	Bogdan Dobrescu; Romania	Sevdalin Marinov; Bulgaria Juho Tolppola; Finland
Bantamweight (– 54 kilograms)	Agasi Agagüloglu; Turkey	Raimkul Malakhbekov; Russia	Aram Ramazyan; Armenia György Farkas; Hungary
Featherweight (– 57 kilograms)	Ramaz Paliani; Turkey	Boris Georgiev; Bulgaria	Alexei Vorobiyev; Belarus Falk Huste; Germany
Lightweight (– 60 kilograms)	Alexander Maletin; Russia	Filip Palić; Croatia	Selim Palyani; Turkey Norman Schuster; Germany
Light Welterweight (– 63.5 kilograms)	Aleksandr Leonov; Russia	Dimitar Stilianov; Bulgaria	Nurhan Süleymanoglu; Turkey Willy Blain; France
Welterweight (– 67 kilograms)	Bülent Ulusoy; Turkey	Valeri Braschnik; Ukraine	Darius Jasevičius; Lithuania Mihály Kótai; Hungary
Light Middleweight (– 71 kilograms)	Felix Sturm; Germany	Andrey Mishin; Russia	Dimitri Usagin; Bulgaria (Federal Republic of Yugoslavia) Nikola Sjekloća; Yugoslavia
Middleweight (– 75 kilograms)	Zsolt Erdei; Hungary	Stjepan Božić; Croatia	Oleksandr Zubrihin; Ukraine Juha Ruokola; Finland
Light Heavyweight (– 81 kilograms)	Aleksandr Lebziak; Russia	Claudiu Rasko; Romania	(Federal Republic of Yugoslavia) Milorad Gajović; Yugoslavia Ali Ismayilov; Azerbaijan
Heavyweight (– 91 kilograms)	Jackson Chanet; France	Sultanahmed Ibragimov; Russia	Emil Garai; Hungary Andreas Gustavsson; Sweden
Super Heavyweight (+ 91 kilograms)	Alexei Lezin; Russia	Paolo Vidoz; Italy	Cengiz Koç; Germany Bagrat Oghanian; Armenia
