= Cristián Bejarano =

Mexican boxer (born 1981)

Personal information
- Full name: Cristián Bejarano Benítez
- Nickname: El Diablo
- Born: 25 July 1981 (age 45) Chihuahua, Mexico
- Height: 170 cm (5 ft 7 in)
- Weight: 60 kg (132 lb)
Medal record
Men's boxing
Representing Mexico
Olympic Games
Bronze medal – third place	2000 Sydney	Lightweight
Pan American Games
Bronze medal – third place	1999 Winnipeg	Lightweight

Cristián Bejarano Benítez (born 25 July 1981) is a Mexican former professional boxer who competed from 2001 to 2007. As an amateur, he won bronze medals at the 1999 Pan American Games and 2000 Summer Olympics.

== Olympic results ==
- Defeated Gilbert Khunwane (Botswana) 17–5
- Defeated Gheorghe Lungu (Romania) 14–11
- Defeated Almazbek Raimkulov (Kyrgyzstan) 14–12
- Lost to Andriy Kotelnyk (Ukraine) 14–22

== Professional career ==
A year later he made his professional debut.

Bejarano turned pro in 2001 and has won his first 14 bouts against unknowns. He then he edged out former WBC champion Cesar Bazan.
