= Mike Alvarado =

American boxer

Personal information
- Nickname: Mile High
- Nationality: American
- Born: July 28, 1980 (age 46) Denver, Colorado, U.S.
- Height: 5 ft 9 in (175 cm)
- Weight: Light welterweight; Welterweight

Boxing career
- Reach: 69 1/2 in (177 cm)
- Stance: Orthodox

Boxing record
- Total fights: 45
- Wins: 40
- Win by KO: 28
- Losses: 5

Mike Alvarado (born July 28, 1980) is a former American professional boxer who held the WBO light welterweight world title in 2013.

== Early life ==
Alvarado was born in Denver, Colorado. He is the cousin of featherweight prospect Ricky López and his biological father was 17-0 boxing prospect Ron Cisneros who, when Alvarado was young, separated from his mother.

== Amateur career ==
Alvarado was a two time Colorado Class 4A state high school wrestling champion at Skyview High School. Alvarado decided not to wrestle in college and instead selected a boxing career. In a span of about three years, Alvarado compiled a record of 36–5. Among his defeated opponents were Chad Aquino and eventual 2004 Athens Olympian Andre Dirrell, both of whom he defeated to take the Ringside National Championship in 2001.

== Professional career ==
=== Alvarado vs. Malignaggi cancellation ===
Alvarado was going to fight Paulie Malignaggi but he suffered an elbow injury and withdrew from the fight set for June 27, 2009.

He served a 5-month prison sentence and made a return to boxing with a 2nd-round KO of Lenin Arroyo. Alvarado was to fight on Latin Fury 15 but was back in jail for parole violations, he had been on probation for "traffic and driving offenses and another charge." Alvarado then made a successful return to the ring by knocking out the veteran Joshua Burns. Up to this point in his career, Alvarado had beaten fighters such as Carlos Molina, Michael Clark, Michel Rosales, César Bazán, Emmanuel Clottey, and Juaquin Gallardo.

Alvarado beat Ghana's Raymond Narh (25-1), to win the WBC Continental Americas Light Welterweight Championship, which he would later vacate just before his fight with Gabriel Martínez. This bout was on Showtime's televised portion of the Pacquiao vs. Mosley undercard. Alvarado's next victory was against Gabriel Martínez, to win IBF Latino Light Welterweight Championship. The bout took place on July 30, 2011, in Denver, Colorado.

=== Alvarado vs. Prescott ===
Alvarado fought Breidis Prescott on November 12, 2011, in Las Vegas, Nevada, on the undercard of Manny Pacquiao vs. Juan Manuel Márquez III. Prescott started out the fight fast, and was able to successfully out-box Alvarado for the first 5 rounds, building a lead on the scorecards. In the middle and late rounds, Alvarado became the main aggressor, and cut the distance, effectively trading shots with Prescott on the inside, and winning the middle and late rounds. By the 10th round, Prescott seemed out of gas and Alvarado took advantage, launching a large offensive attack in the opening minute of the round. Then, with 1:43 left in the fight, Alvarado knocked Prescott down with left and right uppercuts. Prescott was able to get up, but Alvarado came back with two hard rights sending Prescott to the ropes, and then landed 3 straight right uppercuts. Prescott was leaning forward, hanging onto Alvarado and not returning fire, prompting the referee to stop the fight with 1:07 left in the bout. Alvarado was down 87–84, 87–84, and 86–85 at the time of the stoppage, in what was a close fight.

=== Alvarado vs. Herrera ===
Alvarado's next fight was against a top light welterweight contender in Mauricio Herrera, at the Mandalay Bay Resort & Casino, also located in Las Vegas, Nevada. Herrera was coming off solid wins over Mike Dallas Jr. and Ruslan Provodnikov prior to his bout with Alvarado. Herrera started off well, successfully beating Alvarado to the punch, and slipping most of Alvarado's attack in the first round. In the 2nd round, Herrera decided to stand and trade with the bigger Alvarado, in a round where Alvarado controlled the pace and landed the harder punches. The pace would continue in the early and middle rounds, with Alvarado taking Herrera to the ropes and landing the harder punches, but with Herrera landing combinations of his own on Alvarado. By the later rounds, Alvarado had seized control, and began to tee off on Herrera, whose eye was completely closed by rounds 9 and 10. The fighters ended the fight in the 12th round, trading blows in the middle of the ring. Alvarado was awarded the clear unanimous decision win, with scores of 99–91, 97–93, and 96–94. After the fight, Alvarado said he wanted a big fight with Mexican Champion Juan Manuel Márquez, saying he's paid his dues and deserves a big fight at this point.

He was named to "The Gatti List" on The Fight Game with Jim Lampley on HBO in May 2012. The list consists of the Top 10 most entertaining fighters.

=== Alvarado vs. Ríos I & II ===
Coming in as two undefeated fighters, Alvarado faced Brandon Ríos on October 13, 2012, at the Home Depot Center in Carson, California. Alvarado was ahead on the scorecards up until the 6th round, in which Rios hurt him with a crushing right. Rios was able to stop him in the 7th as referee Pat Russell stopped the bout at 1:57 of the round. The fight was voted the 2012 Fight of the Year by Sports Illustrated.

A much anticipated rematch was held on March 30, 2013, at the Mandalay Bay in Las Vegas, Nevada. Like the first fight, both came in with a lot of fireworks as they continued to go toe to toe, until Alvarado changed strategy and became a lot more evasive and harder to hit with fancy footwork. Alvarado defeated Rios by unanimous decision with scores of 115–113, 115-113 and 114–113 to even up the victory score with Rios, each fighter at this point giving the other their first loss. Top Rank promoter Bob Arum dismissed another rematch and suggested to let the two boxers face other fighters first.

=== Alvarado vs. Provodnikov ===
Alvarado lost his WBO Light Welterweight title to Ruslan Provodnikov on October 19, 2013, at the 1stBank Center in Alvarado's hometown of Denver, Colorado. Provodnikov was ahead on all three scorecards and had knocked Alvarado down twice in the eighth round, when Alvarado elected not to come out for the eleventh round. Before the fight, Alvarado was elevated by the WBO to full title holder (as opposed to interim title holder), thus the fight against Provodnikov was his first defense of the full title.

=== Alvarado vs. Márquez ===
On May 17, 2014, at The Forum, in Inglewood, California, Alvarado was back in action in a welterweight bout against four-division champion and #6 ranked Ring Magazine pound for pound fighter: Juan Manuel "Dinamita" Márquez. The bout was contested for the WBO International Welterweight Championship. He lost the fight by unanimous decision.

== Bare-knuckle boxing ==
Alvarado debuted with Bare Knuckle Fighting Championship on April 29, 2023, at BKFC 41 and lost to James Brown via knockout.

== Professional boxing record ==
45 fights	40 wins	5 losses
By knockout	28	4
By decision	12	1

No.	Result	Record	Opponent	Type	Round, time	Date	Location	Notes
45	Loss	40–5	Arnold Barboza Jr.	KO	3 (10), 0:49	Apr 12, 2019	Staples Center, Los Angeles, California, U.S.	For NABF light welterweight title
44	Win	40–4	Robbie Cannon	TKO	2 (6), 0:41	Oct 13, 2018	CHI Health Center, Omaha, Nebraska, U.S.	
43	Win	39–4	Martín Ángel Martínez	RTD	9 (10), 3:00	Jun 30, 2018	Chesapeake Energy Arena, Oklahoma City, U.S.	
42	Win	38–4	Sidney Siqueira	KO	4 (10), 1:20	Aug 19, 2017	Pinnacle Bank Arena, Lincoln, Nebraska, U.S.	
41	Win	37–4	Matthew Strode	TKO	2 (10), 2:40	May 26, 2017	UIC Pavilion, Chicago, Illinois, U.S.	
40	Win	36–4	Josh Torres	MD	8	Jun 25, 2016	The Bomb Factory Dallas, Texas, U.S.	
39	Win	35–4	Saul Corral	KO	3 (8), 1:25	Mar 18, 2016	Arena Place, Houston, Texas, U.S.	
38	Loss	34–4	Brandon Ríos	RTD	3 (12), 3:00	Jan 24, 2015	1stBank Center, Broomfield, Colorado, U.S.	For vacant WBO International welterweight title
37	Loss	34–3	Juan Manuel Márquez	UD	12	May 17, 2014	The Forum, Inglewood, California, U.S.	For vacant WBO International welterweight title
36	Loss	34–2	Ruslan Provodnikov	RTD	10 (12), 3:00	Oct 19, 2013	1stBank Center, Broomfield, Colorado, U.S.	Lost WBO light welterweight title
35	Win	34–1	Brandon Ríos	UD	12	Mar 30, 2013	Mandalay Bay Events Center, Paradise, Nevada, U.S.	Won vacant WBO interim light welterweight title
34	Loss	33–1	Brandon Ríos	TKO	7 (10), 1:57	Oct 13, 2012	Home Depot Center, Carson, California, U.S.	For vacant WBO Latino light welterweight title
33	Win	33–0	Mauricio Herrera	UD	10	Apr 14, 2012	Mandalay Bay Events Center, Paradise, Nevada, U.S.	
32	Win	32–0	Breidis Prescott	TKO	10 (10), 1:53	Nov 12, 2011	MGM Grand Garden Arena, Paradise, Nevada, U.S.	Retained IBF Latino light welterweight title
31	Win	31–0	Gabriel Martínez	UD	10	Jul 30, 2011	Softball Country Arena, Denver, Colorado, U.S.	Won vacant IBF Latino light welterweight title
30	Win	30–0	Ray Narh	RTD	3 (10), 3:00	May 7, 2011	MGM Grand Garden Arena, Paradise, Nevada, U.S.	Won vacant WBC Continental Americas light welterweight title
29	Win	29–0	Dean Harrison	RTD	4 (8), 3:00	Feb 19, 2011	Mandalay Bay Events Center, Paradise, Nevada, U.S.	
28	Win	28–0	Joshua Burns	TKO	3 (6), 0:43	Nov 20, 2010	WinStar World Casino, Thackerville, Oklahoma, U.S.	
27	Win	27–0	Lenin Arroyo	TKO	2 (10), 0:42	Apr 3, 2010	American Bank Center, Corpus Christi, Texas, U.S.	
26	Win	26–0	Juaquin Gallardo	UD	8	May 2, 2009	MGM Grand Garden Arena, Paradise, Nevada, U.S.	
25	Win	25–0	Emmanuel Clottey	KO	10 (10), 2:58	Mar 7, 2009	Mile High Event Center, Commerce City, Colorado, U.S.	
24	Win	24–0	Miguel Ángel Huerta	TKO	4 (10), 2:22	Dec 19, 2008	National Western Complex Arena, Denver, Colorado, U.S.	
23	Win	23–0	Manuel Garnica	TKO	4 (10), 2:17	Oct 3, 2008	National Western Complex Arena, Denver, Colorado, U.S.	
22	Win	22–0	César Bazán	KO	4 (10), 2:46	Jul 26, 2008	MGM Grand Garden Arena, Paradise, Nevada, U.S.	
21	Win	21–0	Michel Rosales	TKO	7 (10), 1:28	May 9, 2008	Isleta Casino & Resort, Albuquerque, New Mexico, U.S.	
20	Win	20–0	Jesús Rodríguez	UD	10	Feb 15, 2008	Cicero Stadium, Cicero, Illinois, U.S.	
19	Win	19–0	Michael Clark	TKO	1 (10), 1:27	Dec 1, 2007	Tingley Coliseum, Albuquerque, New Mexico, U.S.	
18	Win	18–0	Jorge Alberto Padilla	TKO	8 (10), 2:40	Aug 24, 2007	Congress Theater, Chicago, Illinois, U.S.	
17	Win	17–0	Francisco Campos	KO	2 (8), 1:50	Jun 8, 2007	Hudson-Campbell Fitness Center, Gary, Indiana, U.S.	
16	Win	16–0	Carlos Molina	MD	8	Feb 16, 2007	Cicero Stadium, Cicero, Illinois, U.S.	
15	Win	15–0	Edvan Dos Santos Barros	UD	8	Aug 18, 2006	Convention Center, Pasadena, Texas, U.S.	
14	Win	14–0	Maximino Cuevas	RTD	5 (8), 3:00	Jun 2, 2006	Envy Nightclub, Tucson, Arizona, U.S.	
13	Win	13–0	Joel De La Torre	UD	8	Mar 31, 2006	Edgewater Hotel and Casino, Laughlin, Nevada, U.S.	
12	Win	12–0	Angel Roman	UD	6	Oct 7, 2005	The Aladdin, Paradise, Nevada, U.S.	
11	Win	11–0	Arthur Brambila	UD	6	Sep 17, 2005	America West Arena, Phoenix, Arizona, U.S.	
10	Win	10–0	Chad Lawshe	TKO	3 (6), 1:44	Aug 26, 2005	D & I Colonial Ballroom, Houston, Texas, U.S.	
9	Win	9–0	Solomon Tellez	TKO	3 (6), 2:10	May 6, 2005	Fort McDowell Casino, Fountain Hills, Arizona, U.S.	
8	Win	8–0	Hilario Lopez	UD	6	Mar 19, 2005	MGM Grand Garden Arena, Paradise, Nevada, U.S.	
7	Win	7–0	Felipe Campana	TKO	2 (4), 2:53	Feb 18, 2005	Fort McDowell Casino, Fountain Hills, Arizona, U.S.	
6	Win	6–0	Fernando Chacon	TKO	3 (6), 1:08	Dec 17, 2004	Dodge Arena, Hidalgo, Texas, U.S.	
5	Win	5–0	Andrew Keon	KO	1 (4), 0:28	Oct 16, 2004	Radisson Graystone Castle Hotel, Thornton, Colorado, U.S.	
4	Win	4–0	Candelario Garcia	TKO	1 (4), 1:29	Sep 18, 2004	Wings Over the Rockies Air and Space Museum, Denver, Colorado, U.S.	
3	Win	3–0	Robert Howard	KO	1 (4), 2:03	Jul 3, 2004	Douglas County, Castle Rock, Colorado, U.S.	
2	Win	2–0	Rudy Cruz	TKO	1 (4), 2:18	Apr 17, 2004	Pechanga Resort & Casino, Temecula, California, U.S.	
1	Win	1–0	Istafa Jihad	KO	1 (4), 1:45	Feb 28, 2004	Radisson Graystone Castle Hotel, Thornton, Colorado, U.S.	

== Bare knuckle record ==
Professional record breakdown
1 match	0 wins	1 loss
By knockout	0	1

Res.	Record	Opponent	Method	Event	Date	Round	Time	Location	Notes
Loss	0–1	James Brown	KO	BKFC 41	April 29, 2023	2	2:00	Broomfield, Colorado	

== See also ==
- Notable boxing families

Sporting positions
Regional boxing titles
Vacant Title last held by Rodolfo López	WBC Continental Americas light welterweight champion May 7, 2011 – July 2011; Vacated	Vacant Title next held by Tony Luis
Vacant Title last held by Heraclides Barrantes	IBF Latino light welterweight champion July 30, 2011 – October 2012; Vacated	Vacant Title next held by Sergio Mauricio Gil
World boxing titles
Vacant Title last held by Juan Manuel Márquez	WBO light welterweight champion Interim title March 30 – October 12, 2013; Promoted	Vacant Title next held by Arnold Barboza Jr.
Preceded by Juan Manuel Márquez; Vacated	WBO light welterweight champion October 12 – 19, 2013	Succeeded by Ruslan Provodnikov
