= Bagrat Oghanian =

American boxer (1981–2021)

Medal record

Men's boxing

Representing Armenia

European Amateur Championships
Bronze medal – third place	2000 Tampere	Super heavyweight

Bagrat Oghanian (5 February 1981 – 18 December 2021) was an Armenian boxer best known for winning the Super Heavyweight Bronze medal at the 2000 European Amateur Boxing Championships.

== Life and career ==
As an amateur, he scored his biggest success by winning Bronze in Tampere 2000. Oghanian turned pro in 2002 in the United States but wasn't successful. He lost to unknown Valery Chechenev and retired in 2005.

Oghanian died on 18 December 2021, at the age of 40.
