= Somchai Chimlum =

Thai boxer

Personal information
- Nationality: Thai
- Born: 22 February 1976 (age 50)

Sport
- Sport: Boxing

Somchai Chimlum (Thai: สมชาย ฉิมรัมย์, RTGS: Chimram, born 22 February 1976) is a Thai boxer. He initially fought Muay Thai matches under the stage name Namna Prasathinphanomrung (นำหน้า ปราสาทหินพนมรุ้ง), and is a former Lumpinee champion. He later shifted to international boxing, making the National Team around the same time he joined the Royal Thai Navy, in 1995. He competed in the men's middleweight event at the 2000 Summer Olympics.

Somchai retired from the Navy, where he held the rank of Petty Officer 1st Class, in 2010, and emigrated to Australia. He now works as a mixed martial arts coach in Melbourne, and is married.
