= Selim Palyani =

Turkish boxer (born 1976)

Personal information
- Full name: Selim Palyani
- Nationality: Turkey
- Born: April 5, 1976 (age 50)
- Height: 1.74 m (5 ft 9 in)
- Weight: 60 kg (130 lb)

Sport
- Sport: Boxing
- Weight class: Lightweight
Medal record
European Amateur Championships
| Bronze medal – third place | 2000 Tampere | Lightweight |

Selim Palyani (born April 5, 1976) is a boxer from Turkey, who won the bronze medal in the Men's Lightweight (– 60 kg) division at the 2000 European Amateur Boxing Championships in Tampere, Finland.

Palyani represented his native country at the 2000 Summer Olympics in Sydney, Australia. There he was stopped in the quarterfinals of the Men's Lightweight division by Russia's eventual bronze medalist Alexandr Maletin.
