= Jerson Ravelo =

Dominican Republic born American boxer

Personal information
- Nickname: Super Jerz
- Nationality: Dominican - American
- Born: July 30, 1977 (age 48) San Cristobal, Dominican Republic
- Height: 6 ft 2 in (2 m)
- Weight: 119 kg (262 lb)

Boxing career
- Reach: 193 cm (76 in)

Boxing record
- Total fights: 26
- Wins: 21
- Win by KO: 12
- Losses: 5
- Draws: 0

Jerson Ravelo (born July 30, 1977) is a boxer from the Dominican Republic, who represented his native country at the 2000 Summer Olympics in Sydney in the Men's 75 kg Division.

== Personal ==
Ravelo currently resides in Newark, New Jersey, with his son Jerson Jr. While many fighters pressure their children, particularly their namesakes, into following their fistic footsteps, Ravelo doesn't want that for his son.

"I'm doing this for my son and my family. As of right now, he doesn't even show no interest in boxing, which is good."

Ravelo's favorite fighter is Roy Jones Jr. "The way he fights, the things that he's done are incredible" says Ravelo. "A lot of people don't give him credit. They talk about he never fought anybody, but like he said in his song, he just made them look like nobodies."

== Amateur career ==
Ravelo was the 1998 National Golden Gloves Middleweight champion. Ravelo also represented the Dominican Republic as a Middleweight at the 2000 Sydney Olympic games, he was eliminated in the opening round by Paul Miller of Australia, on an 8-7 decision.

== Professional career ==
Upon turning professional, Ravelo signed a promotional deal with Lou Dibella's Dibella Entertainment. He made his debut as a professional on January 27, 2001, in Madison Square Garden in New York City, where he defeated America's Miguel Gutierrez. He became the first 2000 Olympian to reach double digit wins as a pro. In 2004 Ravelo was upset by David Alfonso Lopez by TKO.

Ravelo says, "Before that fight I didn't want to fight anymore. I didn't have no confidence because that was prior to me getting the surgeries and that was when I was coming back. It helped me come back to get my confidence back up and come back to reality. Before that fight, I was walking on a cloud."

Numerous injuries to his back and right hand hampered his career, and he didn't see any action in the year 2005 as a result. In that time period, things soured with Jerson's promotional situation. The contract contained a clause stating that if Jerson was injured for over a year, Dibella Entertainment could terminate the contract. Ravelo was subsequently released by Dibella.

"Once a fighter has back problems", says Ravelo, "he's always going to have back problems. I can go 6 months, a year without feeling my back at all. But I can wake up one day and for a week my back will be hurting me."

In 2006, Jerson signed a promotional contract with The Contender Group. "They care about their fighters," Ravelo said. "They're not trying to make a quick buck out of a fighter, they're looking long term." Returning from substantial layoffs, Ravelo reeled off three consecutive first round knockouts.

The next order of business was a showdown with then-undefeated Allan Green of Tulsa, Oklahoma on October 14, 2006. Jerson was stopped in the eighth round. In that fight, Ravelo suffered another injury to his right hand.

Ravelo rebounded in 2007 with a unanimous decision over England's Paul Buchannan, whom he knocked down in the third round. That fight was a part of The Contender's USA versus UK special.

Ravelo has gone through a who's who of trainers in his career, including Mark Breland, Tommy Brooks, Tommy Parks, Charles Murray, Anthony Ham, Bouie Fischer and Oscar Suarez. He is currently trained by Nettles Nasser, who also guides Henry Crawford and Omar Sheika.

Of Nasser, Ravelo says, "He's a good trainer. He teaches the right things. He tells you what to do. He motivates his fighters. I know he don't get a lot of credit because he's young. I think he's one of the better coaches out there."
