= Cleiton Conceição =

Brazilian boxer (born 1978)

Cleiton Conceição (born November 1, 1978, in Cruz das Almas, Bahia) is a Brazilian boxer, who represented his native country in the middleweight division at the 2000 Summer Olympics in Sydney, Australia. There he was eliminated in the first round by Jeff Lacy of the United States.
