= Gheorghe Lungu (boxer) =

Romanian boxer

Personal information
- Born: July 5, 1978 (age 47) București, Romania
Medal record
Men's boxing
Representing Romania
World Amateur Championships
Bronze medal – third place	1999 Houston	Lightweight

Gheorghe Lungu (born July 5, 1978 in București) is a boxer from Romania.

He participated in the 2000 Summer Olympics for his native European country. There he was stopped in the second round of the men's lightweight (– 60 kg) division by Mexico's eventual bronze medalist Cristián Bejarano.

Lungu won the bronze medal in the same division one year earlier, at the 1999 World Amateur Boxing Championships in Houston, Texas.
