= David Jackson (American boxer) =

American boxer

Personal information
- Full name: David Lovelle Jackson
- Born: March 29, 1976 (age 50) Seattle, Washington, U.S.

Sport
- Country: United States
- Sport: Boxing

David Lovelle Jackson (born March 29, 1976) is an American Olympic boxer.

He competed in the men's Lightweight division at the 2000 Summer Olympics in Sydney.

Jackson was born in Seattle, Washington and attended Garfield High School.
