= Teymur Qasımov =

Azerbaijani sprinter (born 1973)

Personal information
- Nationality: Azerbaijani
- Born: 14 October 1973 (age 53)

Sport
- Sport: Sprinting
- Event: 100 metres

Teymur Qasımov (born 14 October 1973) is an Azerbaijani sprinter. He competed in the 100 metres at the 2000 Summer Olympics and the 2004 Summer Olympics.
