= Willy Blain =

French boxer (born 1978)

Personal information
- Nickname: Small Leonard
- Nationality: French
- Born: 24 April 1978 (age 48) Saint-Denis, Réunion
- Height: 1.74 m (5 ft 9 in)
- Weight: Super lightweight

Boxing career
- Stance: Southpaw

Boxing record
- Total fights: 27
- Wins: 25
- Win by KO: 4
- Losses: 2
Medal record
Men's Boxing
World Amateur Championships
Gold medal – first place	2003 Bangkok	Light Welterweight
Silver medal – second place	1999 Houston	Light Welterweight
Bronze medal – third place	2001 Belfast	Light Welterweight
European Amateur Championships
Silver medal – second place	2002 Perm	Light Welterweight
Bronze medal – third place	2000 Tampere	Light Welterweight
Bronze medal – third place	2004 Pula	Light Welterweight
EU Amateur Championships
Gold medal – first place	2003 Strasbourg	Light Welterweight
Mediterranean Games
Silver medal – second place	2001 Tunis	Light Welterweight

Willy Blain (born 24 April 1978) is a French boxer, best known to win the 2003 amateur world title in the Light Welterweight division.

== Amateur ==
The southpaw won silver at the World Championships 1999, losing only to Uzbek Mahammatkodir Abdoollayev. He represented his native country at two Summer Olympics, starting in 2000 in Sydney, Australia where he had a 1st round bye and immediately lost to Diógenes Luña (Cuba) 14-25.

His biggest achievement as an amateur was winning the world title at the 2003 World Amateur Boxing Championships in Bangkok, Thailand with a controversial final win over Alexander Maletin.

Olympic Results 2004

- Defeated Mohamed Ali Sassi (Tunisia) 36-14
- Defeated Alexandr Maletin (Russia) 28-20
- Lost to eventual winner Manus Boonjumnong (Thailand) 8-20

== Pro ==
Nicknamed "Small Leonard" he made his professional debut on November 16, 2004 in Germany against Francisco Gómez of Spain but showed little power and a bad chin so far.
