= Antonios Giannoulas =

Greek boxer (born 1976)

Personal information
- Nationality: Greek
- Born: 22 October 1976 (age 48); Kozani, Greece

Sport
- Sport: Boxing

Antonios Giannoulas (born 22 October 1976) is a Greek boxer. He competed in the men's middleweight event at the 2000 Summer Olympics.
