= Juaquin Gallardo =

American boxer

Personal information
- Nickname: Killer
- Born: May 3, 1977 (age 49) San Leandro, California
- Height: 5 ft 11 in (180 cm)
- Weight: Welterweight; Light welterweight

Boxing career
- Reach: 73 in (185 cm)
- Stance: Orthodox

Boxing record
- Total fights: 31
- Wins: 22
- Win by KO: 7
- Losses: 8
- Draws: 1
- No contests: 0

Juaquin Gallardo (born May 3, 1977) is an American professional boxer and is the former WBC Latino Light Welterweight Champion.

== Amateur career ==
Gallardo had over 180 amateur career bouts. In 1995 he won the National Golden Gloves Championships at Light Flyweight and was a 1996 U.S. Olympic team alternate. Gallardo had won the 1994 Olympic Festival in St. Louis, MO. Gallardo had won the National Silver Gloves 5 consecutive years 1989-1993 (11 yrs. old 80 lbs., 12 yrs. old 85 lbs., 13 yrs. old 90 lbs., 14 yrs. old 95., 15 yrs. old 106 lbs.) 1992 Junior Olympic Silver Medalist at 90 lbs. 1993 Junior Olympic Gold Medalist at 106 lbs.

== Professional career ==
After beating title contender Arturo Morua, he would then lose a very disputed decision to IBO Light Welterweight World Champion Colin Lynes.

=== WBC Latino Championship ===
In February 2007 Gallardo upset Lenin Arroyo to win the WBC Latino Light Welterweight Championship, the bout was held at the Miccosukee Indian Gaming Resort in Miami, Florida.

Gallardo then lost close fights to undefeated Mexican American Mike Alvarado former W.B.A. Light Welterweight World Champion, former I.B.F. Light Welterweight World Champion Lamont Peterson.
