= Marian Velicu =

Romanian boxer (1977–2024)

Personal information
- Born: 4 July 1977 Comana, Giurgiu, Romania
- Died: 10 July 2024 (aged 47)
Medal record
Men's Boxing
Representing Romania
World Amateur Championships
Silver medal – second place	2001 Belfast	Light Flyweight
European Amateur Championships
Bronze medal – third place	2000 Tampere	Light Flyweight

Marian Velicu (4 July 1977 – 10 July 2024) was a Romanian boxer, who won the bronze medal in the Men's Light Flyweight (– 48 kg) division at the 2000 European Amateur Boxing Championships in Tampere, Finland. A year later he won the silver medal in the same weight division at the World Amateur Boxing Championships in Belfast.

Velicu represented his country at the 2000 Summer Olympics in Sydney, Australia. There he was defeated in the second round of the Men's Light Flyweight division by Cuba's eventual bronze medalist Maikro Romero.

Velicu died on 10 July 2024, at the age of 47, after a long struggle with kidney disease.
