= Paul Miller (boxer) =

Australian boxer

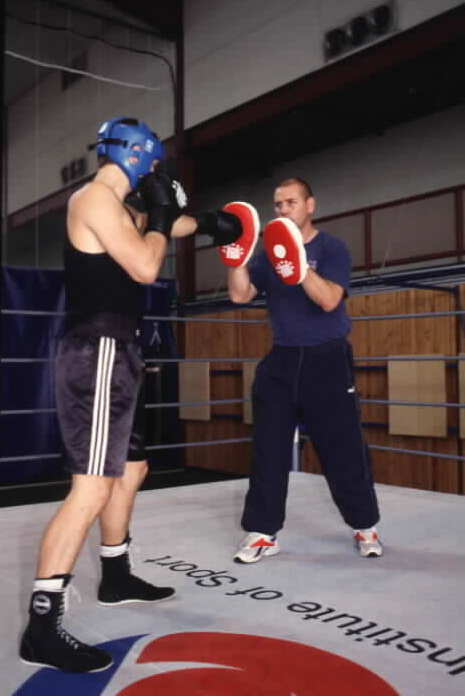
- AIS Head Boxing Coach Bodo Andreass (right) sparring with Paul Miller (left)

Personal information
- Full name: Paul James Miller
- Nationality: Australia
- Born: 15 November 1978 (age 47) Darwin, Northern Territory
- Height: 1.81 m (5 ft 11 in)
- Weight: 75 kg (165 lb)
- Spouse: Daisy Betts
- Children: 4
- Family: Gail Miller (sister); Ben Tune (brother-in-law)

Sport
- Sport: Boxing
- Weight class: Middleweight
- Club: AIS Boxing Team. Sydney Uni Boxing Club.
Medal record
Commonwealth Games
Gold medal – first place	2002 Manchester	Middleweight
Goodwill Games
Silver medal – second place	2001 Brisbane	Middleweight

Paul James Miller (born 15 November 1978 in Darwin, Northern Territory) is a boxer from Australia, who competed at the 2000 Summer Olympics in Sydney.

== Early life ==
Miller was born to parents Bob and Vicki Miller, and was one of six children who all excelled in sporting endeavours. He attended high school at Marist College Ashgrove in Brisbane, where he was school captain in 1995. He was initially a rugby player, until he was sidelined by injury and decided to try boxing, alongside his brother Anthony.

== Career ==
Miller is a six time Australian champion boxer. Before turning professional, he scored 91 wins from 110 bouts.

He represented Australia at the 2000 Summer Olympics in Sydney, in the Men's 75 kg Division. He was beaten by Vugar Alekperov of Azerbaijan in the second round, after defeating Dominica's Jerson Ravelo.

He then went on to win gold at the 2002 Commonwealth Games in Manchester, before turning professional in 2003. He was also an Australian Institute of Sport scholarship holder.

== Olympic results ==
- Defeated Jerson Ravelo (Dominican Republic) 8–7
- Lost to Vugar Alakparov (Azerbaijan) 8–9

== Personal ==
Miller is married to Australian actress Daisy Betts, with whom he has four children. The family lived in Los Angeles for almost a decade, before relocating to Brisbane, where he established his business, Magic Boxing.

His sister Gail Miller, who is two years older, was a gold medalist in water polo at the 2000 Olympic Games.

Miller is also a writer of both fiction and screenplays.
