= Im Jung-bin =

Korean male boxer (born 1973)

Im Jeong-bin
Personal information
- Nationality: South Korean
- Born: 18 May 1973 (age 53)

Sport
- Sport: Boxing

Im Jeong-bin (born 18 May 1973) is a South Korean boxer. He competed in the men's middleweight event at the 2000 Summer Olympics.

== Amateur career ==
At the 1997 Asian Amateur Boxing Championships, he defeated Ignacio Gerodias of the Philippines before losing to Ikrom Berdiyev of Uzbekistan, earning a bronze medal.

At the 1998 Asian Games, he defeated Nurbek Kasenov of Kyrgyzstan and Batmunkh Enkhbayar of Mongolia before losing to Yermakhan Ibraimov of Kazakhstan in the final, winning the silver medal.

At the 2000 Summer Olympics, competing in the light middleweight division, he defeated Ramadan Yasser of Egypt before losing to Akın Kuloğlu of Turkey.
