= Norman Schuster =

German boxer

Personal information
- Born: 13 December 1979 (age 46)
Medal record
Men's Boxing
Representing Germany
European Amateur Championships
Bronze medal – third place	2000 Tampere	Lightweight

Norman Schuster (born 13 December 1979 in Halle an der Saale, Sachsen-Anhalt) is a boxer from Germany, who won the bronze medal in the Men's Lightweight (– 60 kg) division at the 2000 European Amateur Boxing Championships in Tampere, Finland.

Schuster represented his native country at the 2000 Summer Olympics in Sydney, Australia, being the youngest boxer in the German team with 20 years, 280 days. There he was stopped in the first round of the Men's Lightweight division by Venezuela's Patrick López.
