= Oleksandr Zubrihin =

Ukrainian boxer

Oleksandr Zubrikhin
Personal information
- Full name: Олександр Зубріхін
- Nationality: Ukraine
- Born: October 28, 1974 (age 51)
- Height: 1.80 m (5 ft 11 in)
- Weight: 75 kg (165 lb)

Sport
- Sport: Boxing
- Weight class: Middleweight
Medal record
European Amateur Championships
Bronze medal – third place	2000 Tampere	Middleweight

Oleksandr Zubrihin (born October 28, 1974) is a boxer from Ukraine who won the bronze medal in the Men's Middleweight (– 75 kg) division at the 2000 European Amateur Boxing Championships in Tampere, Finland.

Zubrihin represented his native country at the 2000 Summer Olympics in Sydney, Australia. There he was stopped in the quarterfinals of the Men's Middleweight division by Hungary's eventual bronze medalist Zsolt Erdei.
