= Victor Ramos (boxer) =

East Timorese boxer

Personal information
- Born: 14 April 1970 (age 56) Bobonaro, Bobonaro, Portuguese Timor (now Timor Leste)
- Height: 1.68 m (5 ft 6 in)
- Weight: 60 kg (132 lb)

Sport
- Country: East Timor
- Event: Men's Lightweight

Achievements and titles
- Olympic finals: 2000

Victor Ramos (born 14 April 1970) is a retired East Timorese boxer. He was one of the first athletes to represent East Timor at the Olympic Games, when he competed at the Men's lightweight Boxing event at the 2000 Summer Olympics in Sydney, though he technically competed as an individual athlete because East Timor was newly independent and had not yet been formally recognized by the International Olympic Committee. He was also the flag bearer for the Independent Olympians at the 2000 Summer Olympics. Ramos was one of the ten East Timorese athletes who received training in Darwin prior to his participation in the Sydney Olympic Games. However, he lost in round 1 against Ghanaian boxer Raymond Narh and did not advance any further.

Besides competing in the 2000 Summer Olympics, Ramos also competed in the 1997 Southeast Asian Games, where he won a bronze medal representing Indonesia.

The Sydney Olympics followed East Timor's declaration of independence from Indonesia in 1999, and the ensuing violence, and Ramos, like many other East Timorese, fled into the hills with his parents and siblings to escape from the violence.
