= Peter Kariuki Ngumi =

Kenyan boxer (born 1977)

Personal information
- Nationality: Kenyan
- Born: 16 July 1977 (age 47); Nairobi, Kenya

Sport
- Sport: Boxing

Peter Kariuki Ngumi (born 16 July 1977) is a Kenyan boxer. He competed in the men's middleweight event at the 2000 Summer Olympics.
