= Bukom =

Suburb of Accra, Ghana

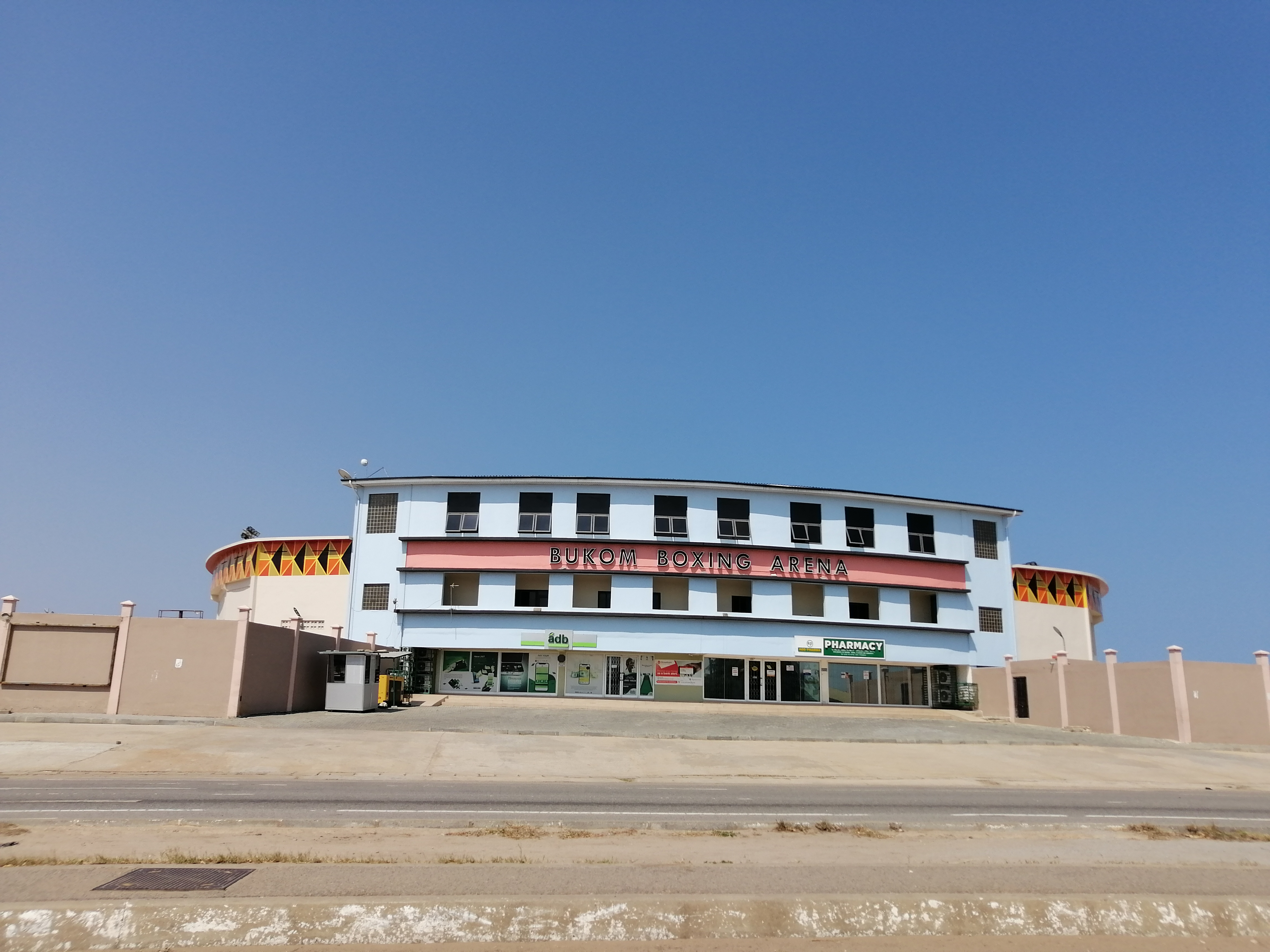
Bukom Boxing Arena

Bukom is a village and suburb of Accra, the capital of Ghana.

Bukom has produced a number of successful boxers. These include Azumah Nelson, Bukom Banku, Ike Quartey and Kwame Asante, as well as welterweight Joshua Clottey, who won the IBF title by defeating Zab Judah in August 2008. He eventually lost the title in his mandatory defense against Miguel Cotto.

Kpanlogo, Gome, Kolomashie, and Azonto are dances peculiar to the Ga people that can be found in Bukom. Due to its location (near the coast), inhabitants of Bukom are mainly fishermen and fishmongers, with kenkey and fried fish with fried pepper and spices normally called black pepper or shito.
