= Tigran Ouzlian =

Greek amateur boxer of Armenian descent

Personal information
- Born: February 11, 1968 (age 58) Abkhazia, Georgia
Medal record
Men's Boxing
Representing Greece
European Amateur Championships
Bronze medal – third place	1998 Minsk	Lightweight
Mediterranean Games
Bronze medal – third place	1997 Bari	Featherweight

Tigran Ouzlian (Greek: Τίγκραν Ούζλιαν, born February 11, 1968) is a Greek amateur boxer of Armenian descent. He represented Greece as a featherweight at the 1996 Summer Olympics and as a lightweight at the 2000 Summer Olympics.
