= Akın Kuloğlu =

Georgian-born Turkish boxer

Akın Kuloğlu (6 February 1972 – 20 August 2001) was a Georgian-born Turkish boxer who competed in the men's middleweight division (75 kg) at the 1996 Summer Olympics in Atlanta, and the 2000 Summer Olympics in Sydney. Shortly after the games, Kuloğlu moved to the United States, and worked as a taxi cab driver in Chicago suburbs.

He was born in Kutaisi. On August 20, 2001, he was killed in a taxi cab crash in Des Plaines, Illinois.

1993 Lost to Ariel Hernandez (Cuba) 7-9

== Olympic Games ==
1996 (as a light welterweight under Georgia)

- Defeated Ricardo Araneda (Chile) 10–3
- Lost to Mohamed Bahari (Algeria) 5–8

2000 (as a light welterweight under Turkey)

- Defeated Mariano Carrera (Argentina) – won after the referee stopped the contest for outscoring
- Defeated Im Jung-Bin (South Korea) – his opponent retired on the fourth and final round
- Lost to Vugar Alakparov (Azerbaijan) 8–18
