= Kid Diamond =

Kyrgyzstani boxer (born 1977)

Almazbek Raimkulov
Personal information
- Nickname: Kid Diamond
- Nationality: Kyrgyzstan
- Born: February 18, 1977 (age 49) Bishkek, Kirghiz SSR, Soviet Union
- Height: 5 ft 7 in (1.70 m)
- Weight: Lightweight

Boxing career
- Reach: 68 in (1.73 m)

Boxing record
- Total fights: 30
- Wins: 27
- Win by KO: 15
- Losses: 2
- Draws: 1
- No contests: 0

Almazbek Raimkulov, better known as Kid Diamond (born February 18, 1977, in Kyrgyzstan) is a retired boxer in the Lightweight division. He was NABF Champion, and among the first professional fighters from Kyrgyzstan to become known worldwide. He turned professional after placing fourth at the Sydney Summer Olympics (2000).

Raiymukulov lives and trains in Las Vegas, Nevada, US.

== Amateur career ==
Raimkulov represented Kyrgyzstan in the 2000 Sydney Olympic Games as a Lightweight fighter. His results were:

- Defeated Tumentsetseg Uitumen (Mongolia) 15-4
- Defeated Jose Cruz Lasso (Colombia) 12-9
- Lost to Cristian Bejarano (Mexico) 12-14

He was fourth at the World Amateur Ranking 2000-2004.
