= Mahac Nuriddinovun =

Azerbaijani boxer

Personal information
- Nationality: Azerbaijani
- Born: 15 December 1977 (age 47)

Sport
- Sport: Boxing

Mahac Nuriddinovun (born 15 December 1977) is an Azerbaijani boxer. He competed in the men's lightweight event at the 2000 Summer Olympics.
