= 2001 Goodwill Games =

International event in Brisbane, Australia

Coordinates: 27°20′32″S 153°4′16″E

- Official logo
- Host city: Brisbane, Queensland
- Country: Australia
- Opening: 29 August 2001
- Closing: 9 September 2001

The 2001 Goodwill Games was the fifth and final edition of the international multi-sport event. The competition was held in Brisbane, Queensland, Australia, from 29 August to 9 September 2001. A total around 1300 athletes took part in 14 sporting competitions. These were the first and only Goodwill Games to be held outside of the US and Russia, and the only time to be taken place in the Southern Hemisphere.

The small scale opening ceremony was held at the Brisbane Entertainment Centre at Boondall and featured The Corrs, Bardot and Keith Urban. There was a live audience of 10,000 and the ceremony was broadcast live to an international audience of 450 million viewers.

The Goodwill Bridge, a pedestrian and cyclist bridge spanning the Brisbane River, is named after the games.

Hosts Australia topped the medal table with 29 gold and 74 total medals. Russia was second with 24 and 73, respectively, while the United States placed third (21 and 71).

== Venues ==
- Brisbane Convention & Exhibition Centre – artistic gymnastics, basketball, boxing, rhythmic gymnastics, trampoline, weightlifting
- ANZ Stadium – athletics
- South Bank Piazza – beach volleyball
- Chandler Velodrome – cycling
- Chandler Aquatic Centre – diving, swimming
- Brisbane Entertainment Centre – figure skating
- Kurrawa Beach, Gold Coast – surf lifesaving

== Sports ==
There were 155 events across 14 sports:

- Athletics
- Basketball
- Beach volleyball
- Boxing
- Cycling
- Diving
- Figure skating
- Gymnastics
- Surf lifesaving
- Swimming
- Trampolining
- Triathlon
- Weightlifting

== Medal table ==
* Host nation (Australia)

2001 Goodwill Games medal table
Rank	Nation	Gold	Silver	Bronze	Total
1	Australia (AUS)*	29	25	20	74
2	Russia (RUS)	24	30	19	73
3	United States (USA)	21	20	30	71
4	China (CHN)	13	8	1	22
5	Cuba (CUB)	11	2	1	14
6	Romania (ROM)	6	3	2	11
7	Germany (GER)	5	1	5	11
8	Ukraine (UKR)	4	9	8	21
9	Japan (JPN)	4	0	3	7
10	Poland (POL)	3	5	3	11
11	Kenya (KEN)	3	4	5	12
12	South Africa (RSA)	3	2	1	6
13	Brazil (BRA)	3	1	1	5
13	Great Britain (GBR)	3	1	1	5
15	New Zealand (NZL)	2	3	2	7
16	Ethiopia (ETH)	2	2	0	4
17	Czech Republic (CZE)	2	1	0	3
17	Iran (IRI)	2	1	0	3
19	Netherlands (NED)	2	0	0	2
20	Jamaica (JAM)	1	7	3	11
21	Hungary (HUN)	1	4	6	11
22	Sweden (SWE)	1	4	0	5
23	Bulgaria (BUL)	1	3	6	10
24	Belarus (BLR)	1	2	5	8
25	Bahamas (BAH)	1	1	2	4
25	Latvia (LAT)	1	1	2	4
–	Europe All-Stars	1	1	2	4
27	Mexico (MEX)	1	0	1	2
27	Slovakia (SVK)	1	0	1	2
–	World All-Stars (Athletics)	1	0	1	2
29	Dominican Republic (DOM)	1	0	0	1
29	Morocco (MAR)	1	0	0	1
29	Mozambique (MOZ)	1	0	0	1
32	Canada (CAN)	0	4	2	6
33	Argentina (ARG)	0	4	0	4
–	World All-Stars (Swimming)	0	3	0	3
34	Israel (ISR)	0	2	0	2
34	Uzbekistan (UZB)	0	2	0	2
36	Georgia (GEO)	0	1	1	2
37	Burundi (BDI)	0	1	0	1
37	Estonia (EST)	0	1	0	1
37	Lithuania (LTU)	0	1	0	1
40	Saudi Arabia (KSA)	0	0	2	2
40	Spain (ESP)	0	0	2	2
42	Austria (AUT)	0	0	1	1
42	Chinese Taipei (TPE)	0	0	1	1
42	Finland (FIN)	0	0	1	1
42	France (FRA)	0	0	1	1
42	Portugal (POR)	0	0	1	1
42	Puerto Rico (PUR)	0	0	1	1
42	Senegal (SEN)	0	0	1	1
Totals (48 entries)		156	160	145	461

== Participation ==
Athletes from 58 countries took part in the 2001 Goodwill Games.

- Argentina (16)
- Australia (159)
- Austria (3)
- Bahamas (3)
- Belarus (13)
- Belgium (7)
- Bermuda (1)
- Brazil (24)
- Bulgaria (6)
- Burundi (2)
- Canada (48)
- Chad (1)
- China (27)
- Chinese Taipei (2)
- Cuba (46)
- Czech Republic (10)
- Dominican Republic (1)
- Estonia (1)
- Ethiopia (5)
- Finland (4)
- France (12)
- Georgia (1)
- Germany (17)
- Great Britain (34)
- Hungary (5)
- Iran (4)
- Israel (5)
- Jamaica (9)
- Japan (11)
- Kenya (15)
- Latvia (2)
- Lithuania (1)
- Mauritius (1)
- Mexico (2)
- Morocco (3)
- Mozambique (1)
- Netherlands (11)
- New Zealand (50)
- Norway (2)
- Panama (1)
- Poland (16)
- Portugal (1)
- Puerto Rico (1)
- Romania (11)
- Russia (97)
- Saudi Arabia (2)
- Senegal (1)
- Slovakia (1)
- Slovenia (2)
- South Africa (23)
- South Korea (3)
- Spain (14)
- Sri Lanka (1)
- Sweden (13)
- Ukraine (30)
- United States (175)
- Uzbekistan (2)
- Venezuela (1)
;Notes
1. The number of athletes in each country's team is shown in parentheses, where known.
2. A few athletes from these countries also competed for multinational all-star teams in events such as track relays and swimming relays.

== See also ==
- 1982 Commonwealth Games
- 2018 Commonwealth Games
- 2032 Summer Olympics
