= 2005 Boxing World Cup =

Boxing competitions

The 2005 Boxing World Cup was held in Moscow, Russia from July 12 to July 17.

== Group 1 ==
=== Cuba-Thailand ===
GROUP 1 MATCH — Tuesday 2005-07-12
Division	(Cuba) CUBA	(Thailand) THAILAND	Result
– 48 kg	Yan Bartelemí	Suban Pannon	36 – 12
– 51 kg	Andry Laffita	Somjit Jongjohor	24 – +24
– 54 kg	Guillermo Rigondeaux	Worapoj Petchkoom	34 – 16
– 57 kg	Yuriorkis Gamboa	Thongtheang Khlongchan	W – L
– 60 kg	Yordenis Ugás	Pichai Sayotha	45 – 12
– 64 kg	Carlos Banteux	—	W – L
– 69 kg	Erislandy Lara	Manon Boonjumnong	21 – 9
– 75 kg	Yordanis Despaigne	Suriya Prasathinphimai	28 – 11
– 81 kg	Yuniel Dorticos	Elnur Kadyrov	W – L
– 91 kg	Luis Ortiz	Azer Mamedov	W – L
+ 91 kg	Odlanier Solis	Ilgar Mamedov	W – L
	10 wins	1 wins	188 – 84

=== Cuba-Romania ===
GROUP 1 MATCH — Wednesday 2005-07-13
Division	(Cuba) CUBA	(Romania) ROMANIA	Result
– 48 kg	Yan Bartelemí	Iulius Poczo	W – L
– 51 kg	Andry Laffita	—	W – L
– 54 kg	Guillermo Rigondeaux	Zsolt Bedák	28 – 11
– 57 kg	Yuriorkis Gamboa	Viorel Simion	W – L
– 60 kg	Yordenis Ugás	Georgian Popescu	W – L
– 64 kg	Carlos Banteux	—	W – L
– 69 kg	Erislandy Lara	Stefan Dragomir	W – L
– 75 kg	Yordanis Despaigne	Ronald Gavril	W – L
– 81 kg	Yuniel Dorticos	Ovidiu Chereches	W – L
– 91 kg	Luis Ortiz	Daniel Vacaru	W – L
+ 91 kg	Odlanier Solis	Georgel Gavril	W – L
	11 wins	0 wins	28 – 11

=== Romania-Thailand ===
GROUP 1 MATCH — Thursday 2005-07-14
Division	(Romania) ROMANIA	(Thailand) THAILAND	Result
– 48 kg	Iulius Poczo	Suban Pannon	L – W
– 51 kg	—	Somjit Jongjohor	L – W
– 54 kg	Zsolt Bedák	Worapoj Petchkoom	+34 – 34
– 57 kg	Viorel Simion	Thongtheang Khlongchan	L – W
– 60 kg	Georgian Popescu	Pichai Sayotha	L – W
– 64 kg	Ionuţ Gheorghe	Ampon Heanhhom	35 – 27
– 69 kg	Stefan Dragomir	Manon Boonjumnong	W – L
– 75 kg	Ronald Gavril	Suriya Prasathinphimai	W – L
– 81 kg	Ovidiu Chereches	Elnur Kadyrov	45 – 21
– 91 kg	Daniel Vacaru	Azer Mamedov	32 – 48
+ 91 kg	Georgel Gavril	Ilgar Mamedov	W – L
	6 wins	5 wins	146 – 130

=== Final ranking ===
RANK	COUNTRY	W	L
1	Cuba	2	0
2	Romania	1	1
3	Thailand	0	2

== Group 2 ==
=== Russia-Belarus ===
GROUP 2 MATCH — Tuesday 2005-07-12
Division	(Russia) RUSSIA	(Belarus) BELARUS	Result
– 48 kg	Sergey Kazakov	Anton Bekesh	35 – 11
– 51 kg	Georgy Balakshin	Bato-Munko Vankeev	24 – 9
– 54 kg	Maxim Khalikov	Khavazhi Khatsigov	23 – 13
– 57 kg	Aleksei Tishchenko	Sergey Kunitsin	W – L
– 60 kg	Murat Khrachev	Evgeni Kosmatov	33 – 23
– 64 kg	Oleg Komissarov	Andrey Tsiruk	41 – 17
– 69 kg	Andrey Balanov	Vitali Grushak	31 – 19
– 75 kg	Matvey Korobov	Andrey Salakhutdinov	W – L
– 81 kg	Evgeny Makarenko	Andrey Miruk	W – L
– 91 kg	Roman Romanchuk	Mikhail Sheybak	W – L
+ 91 kg	Islam Timurziev	Aliaksandr Apanasionak	W – L
	11 wins	0 wins	187 – 92

=== United States-Belarus ===
GROUP 2 MATCH — Wednesday 2005-07-13
Division	(United States) UNITED STATES	(Belarus) BELARUS	Result
– 48 kg	Vincent Montoya	Anton Bekesh	L – W
– 51 kg	Rau'shee Warren	Bato-Munko Vankeev	W – L
– 54 kg	Gary Russell	Khavazhi Khatsigov	21 – 20
– 57 kg	Mark Davis	Mikhail Bernadskiy	23 – 20
– 60 kg	Ray Robinson	Evgeni Kosmatov	23 – 39
– 64 kg	Karl Dargan	Andrey Tsiruk	28 – 15
– 69 kg	Demetrius Andrade	Vitali Grushak	18 – 27
– 75 kg	Shawn Estrada	Sergey Rabchenko	24 – 16
– 81 kg	William Rosinsky	Andrey Miruk	13 – 33
– 91 kg	Marcus Henry	Mikhail Sheybak	L – W
+ 91 kg	—	Aliaksandr Apanasionak	L – W
	5 wins	6 wins	150 – 170

=== Russia-United States ===
GROUP 2 MATCH — Thursday 2005-07-14
Division	(Russia) RUSSIA	(United States) UNITED STATES	Result
– 48 kg	Sergey Kazakov	Vincent Montoya	W – L
– 51 kg	Georgy Balakshin	Rau'shee Warren	46 – 33
– 54 kg	Maxim Khalikov	Gary Russell	31 – 22
– 57 kg	Aleksei Tishchenko	Mark Davis	W – L
– 60 kg	Murat Khrachev	Stan Martyniouk	W – L
– 64 kg	Oleg Komissarov	Karl Dargan	36 – 22
– 69 kg	Andrey Balanov	Demetrius Andrade	35 – 17
– 75 kg	Matvey Korobov	Daniel Jacobs	W – L
– 81 kg	Evgeny Makarenko	William Rosinsky	W – L
– 91 kg	Roman Romanchuk	Marcus Henry	W – L
+ 91 kg	Islam Timurziev	—	W – L
	11 wins	0 wins	148 – 94

=== Final ranking ===
RANK	COUNTRY	W	L
1	Russia	2	0
2	Belarus	1	1
3	United States	0	2

== Group 3 ==
=== Georgia-Kazakhstan ===
GROUP 3 MATCH — Tuesday 2005-07-12
Division	(Georgia (country)) GEORGIA	(Kazakhstan) KAZAKHSTAN	Result
– 48 kg	Zviad Khaduri	Mirat Sarsembayev	17 – 33
– 51 kg	Nikoloz Izoria	Mirzhan Rakhimzhanov	L – W
– 54 kg	Kacha Lazarashvili	Murat Airmasov	9 – 26
– 57 kg	Koba Pchakadze	Galib Jafarov	26 – 24
– 60 kg	Konstantine Kupatadze	Serik Sapiyev	17 – 41
– 64 kg	Levan Gvamichava	Kanat Orakbayev	36 – 49
– 69 kg	Kakhaber Zhvania	Bakhtiyar Artayev	14 – 23
– 75 kg	Anatoli Kavtaradze	Gennady Golovkin	L – W
– 81 kg	Tornike Ivelashvili	Yerdos Zhanabergenov	L – W
– 91 kg	Beka Lobzhanidze	Zhenis Taumurinov	20 – 11
+ 91 kg	Gaga Bolkvadze	Mukhtarkhan Dildabekov	9 – 24
	2 wins	9 wins	148 – 232

=== Georgia-Africa ===
GROUP 3 MATCH — Wednesday 2005-07-13
Division	(Georgia (country)) GEORGIA	AFRICA	Result
– 48 kg	Zviad Khaduri	Japhet Uutoni	33 – 41
– 51 kg	Nikoloz Izoria	Walid Cherif	29 – 18
– 54 kg	Kacha Lazarashvili	Malik Bouziane	14 – 31
– 57 kg	Koba Pchakadze	—	W – L
– 60 kg	Konstantine Kupatadze	Saifeddine Nejmaoui	24 – 35
– 64 kg	Levan Gvamichava	Adil Bella	45 – 25
– 69 kg	Kakhaber Zhvania	Ait Hammi Miloud	33 – 14
– 75 kg	Revaz Karelishvili	Nabil Kassel	17 – 42
– 81 kg	no contest		
– 91 kg	Beka Lobzhanidze	Mohamed Homrani	27 – 38
+ 91 kg	Gaga Bolkvadze	Mourad Chebbi	32 – 22
	5 wins	5 wins	254 – 266

=== Africa-Kazakhstan ===
GROUP 3 MATCH — Thursday 2005-07-14
Division	AFRICA	(Kazakhstan) KAZAKHSTAN	Result
– 48 kg	Japhet Uutoni	Mirat Sarsembayev	L – W
– 51 kg	Elshad Guliyev	Mirzhan Rakhimzhanov	L – W
– 54 kg	Malik Bouziane	Murat Airmasov	L – W
– 57 kg	—	Galib Jafarov	L – W
– 60 kg	Saifeddine Nejmaoui	Serik Sapiyev	L – W
– 64 kg	Cesaire Rivan	Kanat Orakbayev	L – W
– 69 kg	—	Bakhtiyar Artayev	L – W
– 75 kg	Nabil Kassel	Gennady Golovkin	L – W
– 81 kg	—	Yerdos Zhanabergenov	L – W
– 91 kg	Mohamed Homrani	Dmitriy Gotfrid	L – W
+ 91 kg	Mourad Chebbi	Mukhtarkhan Dildabekov	L – W
	0 wins	11 wins	—

=== Final ranking ===
RANK	COUNTRY	W	L
1	Kazakhstan	2	0
2	Georgia	1	1
3	Africa	0	2

== Group 4 ==
=== Azerbaijan-South Korea ===
GROUP 4 MATCH — Tuesday 2005-07-12
Division	(Azerbaijan) AZERBAIJAN	(South Korea) SOUTH KOREA	Result
– 48 kg	Jeyhun Abiyev	Hong Moo-Won	27 – 30
– 51 kg	Seymur Mamedov	Lee Ok-Sung	28 – 29
– 54 kg	Elshan Ismailov	Son Chul-Han	16 – 33
– 57 kg	Shahin Imranov	Kim Won-Il	17 – 16
– 60 kg	Romal Amanov	Jin Soo-Shin	32 – 21
– 64 kg	Emil Magerramov	Park Kwan-Soo	24 – 18
– 69 kg	Ruslan Khairov	Yang Min-Sook	29 – 8
– 75 kg	Javid Taghiyev	Cho Dok-Jin	27 – 21
– 81 kg	Anar Mirzoyev	Song Hak-Sung	12 – 25
– 91 kg	Vugar Alekperov	Li Zheshuan	30 – 12
+ 91 kg	Muhamed Adamov	Du Zhengchan	W – L
	7 wins	4 wins	242 – 213

=== Ukraine-South Korea ===
GROUP 4 MATCH — Wednesday 2005-07-13
Division	(Ukraine) UKRAINE	(South Korea) SOUTH KOREA	Result
– 48 kg	Alexander Grishchuk	Hong Moo-Won	26 – 43
– 51 kg	Georgiy Chygayev	Lee Ok-Sung	26 – 48
– 54 kg	Maksym Tretyak	Son Chul-Han	W – L
– 57 kg	Servin Suleymanov	Kim Won-Il	39 – 28
– 60 kg	Oleksandr Klyuchko	Jin Soo-Shin	W – L
– 64 kg	Nikolay Semenyaga	Park Kwan-Soo	W – L
– 69 kg	Sergiy Derevyanchenko	Hanati Silamu	23 – 54
– 75 kg	Ismail Sillakh	Cho Dok-Jin	W – L
– 81 kg	Anatoliy Dudchenko	Song Hak-Sung	L – W
– 91 kg	Vitali Mikhieyenko	Li Zheshuan	W – L
+ 91 kg	Vyacheslav Glazkov	Du Zhengchan	W – L
	7 wins	4 wins	114 – 173

=== Azerbaijan-Ukraine ===
GROUP 4 MATCH — Thursday 2005-07-14
Division	(Azerbaijan) AZERBAIJAN	(Ukraine) UKRAINE	Result
– 48 kg	Jeyhun Abiyev	Alexander Grishchuk	W – L
– 51 kg	Seymur Mamedov	Georgiy Chygayev	W – L
– 54 kg	Elshan Ismailov	Maksym Tretyak	33 – 50
– 57 kg	Shahin Imranov	Servin Suleymanov	W – L
– 60 kg	Farhad Adyalov	Oleksandr Klyuchko	14 – 45
– 64 kg	Emil Magerramov	Nikolay Semenyaga	34 – 24
– 69 kg	Ruslan Khairov	Sergiy Derevyanchenko	32 – 19
– 75 kg	Javid Taghiyev	Ismail Sillakh	L – W
– 81 kg	Anar Mirzoyev	—	W – L
– 91 kg	Vugar Alekperov	Vitali Mikhieyenko	20 – 26
+ 91 kg	Muhamed Adamov	Vyacheslav Glazkov	L – W
	6 wins	5 wins	133 – 164

=== Final ranking ===
RANK	COUNTRY	W	L
1	Azerbaijan	2	0
2	Ukraine	1	1
3	South Korea	0	2

== Semifinals ==
=== Azerbaijan-Russia ===
SEMI-FINAL 1 — Saturday 2005-07-16
Division	(Azerbaijan) AZERBAIJAN	(Russia) RUSSIA	Result
– 48 kg	—	Sergey Kazakov	L – W
– 51 kg	Elshad Guliyev	Georgy Balakshin	L – W
– 54 kg	Elshan Ismailov	Maxim Khalikov	24 – 41
– 57 kg	Shahin Imranov	Aleksei Tishchenko	L – W
– 60 kg	Romal Amanov	Murat Khrachev	L – W
– 64 kg	Emil Magerramov	Oleg Komissarov	17 – 33
– 69 kg	—	Andrey Balanov	L – W
– 75 kg	Javid Taghiyev	Matvey Korobov	L – W
– 81 kg	Anar Mirzoyev	Evgeny Makarenko	L – W
– 91 kg	Elchin Alizade	Roman Romanchuk	L – W
+ 91 kg	Muhamed Adamov	Islam Timurziev	L – W
	0 wins	11 wins	41 – 74

=== Cuba-Kazakhstan ===
SEMI-FINAL 2 — Saturday 2005-07-16
Division	(Cuba) CUBA	(Kazakhstan) KAZAKHSTAN	Result
– 48 kg	Yan Bartelemí	Mirat Sarsembayev	44 – 15
– 51 kg	Andry Laffita	Mirzhan Rakhimzhanov	28 – 40
– 54 kg	Guillermo Rigondeaux	Murat Airmasov	34 – 7
– 57 kg	Yuriorkis Gamboa	Galib Jafarov	48 – 35
– 60 kg	Yordenis Ugás	Serik Sapiyev	35 – 46
– 64 kg	Carlos Banteux	Kanat Orakbayev	36 – 44
– 69 kg	Erislandy Lara	Bakhyt Sarsekbayev	39 – 22
– 75 kg	Yordanis Despaigne	Gennady Golovkin	37 – 40
– 81 kg	Yuniel Dorticos	Yerdos Zhanabergenov	L – W
– 91 kg	Luis Ortiz	Dmitriy Gotfrid	34 – 13
+ 91 kg	Odlanier Solis	Mukhtarkhan Dildabekov	27 – 20
	6 wins	5 wins	362 – 282

== Final ==
=== Cuba-Russia ===
FINAL — Sunday 2005-07-17
Division	(Cuba) CUBA	(Russia) RUSSIA	Result
– 48 kg	Yan Bartelemí	Sergey Kazakov	26 – 14
– 51 kg	Andry Laffita	Georgy Balakshin	36 – 22
– 54 kg	Guillermo Rigondeaux	Maxim Khalikov	37 – 21
– 57 kg	Yuriorkis Gamboa	Aleksei Tishchenko	28 – 46
– 60 kg	Yordenis Ugás	Murat Khrachev	50 – 30
– 64 kg	Carlos Banteux	Oleg Komissarov	25 – 30
– 69 kg	Erislandy Lara	Andrey Balanov	21 – 36
– 75 kg	Yordanis Despaigne	Matvey Korobov	39 – 53
– 81 kg	Ismaikel Pérez	Evgeny Makarenko	31 – 47
– 91 kg	Luis Ortiz	Roman Romanchuk	47 – 64
+ 91 kg	Odlanier Solis	Islam Timurziev	26 – 27
	4 wins	7 wins	365 – 389
