= Boxing at the 2008 Summer Olympics – Flyweight =

Boxing competitions

The flyweight competition was the second-lowest weight class featured in amateur boxing at the 2008 Summer Olympics, and was held at the Workers Indoor Arena. Flyweights were limited to a maximum of 51 kilograms (112.4 lbs) in body mass.

Like all Olympic boxing events, the competition was a straight single-elimination tournament. Both semifinal losers were awarded bronze medals, so no boxers competed again after their first loss. Bouts consisted of four rounds of two minutes each, with one-minute breaks between rounds. Punches scored only if the white area on the front of the glove made full contact with the front of the head or torso of the opponent. Five judges scored each bout; three of the judges had to signal a scoring punch within one second for the punch to score. The winner of the bout was the boxer who scored the most valid punches by the end of the bout.

== Medalists ==
Gold	Somjit Jongjohor; Thailand
Silver	Andry Laffita; Cuba
Bronze	Georgy Balakshin; Russia
Bronze	Vincenzo Picardi; Italy

== Draw ==
All times are China Standard Time (UTC+8)

Round of 32; Tuesday, August 12, 2008; 13:30-14:45 & 19:00-20:30
Mirat Sarsembayev (KAZ)	14
Rafał Kaczor (POL)	5
Tulashboy Doniyorov (UZB)	10
Bernard Ngumba Irungu (KEN)	1
Jitender Kumar (IND)	RET
Furkan Ulaş Memiş (TUR)
Juan Carlos Payano (DOM)	10
Jérôme Thomas (FRA)	6
Vincenzo Picardi (ITA)	10
Cassius Chiyanika (ZAM)	3
Walid Cherif (TUN)	14
Stephen Sutherland (AUS)	2
Rau'shee Warren (USA)	8
Lee Ok-Sung (KOR)	9
Samir Mammadov (AZE)	19
Abdelillah Nhaila (MAR)	4
Somjit Jongjohor (THA)	6
Eddie Valenzuela (GUA)	1
Anurudha Rathnayake (SRI)	3
Robenílson de Jesus (BRA)	13
Jackson Chauke (RSA)	1
Anvar Yunusov (TJK)	9

Round of 16; Saturday, August 16, 2008; 13:30-15:30
McWilliams Arroyo (PUR)	14
Norbert Kalucza (HUN)	6
Andry Laffita (CUB)	9
Khalid Saeed Yafai (GBR)	3
Georgy Balakshin (RUS)	12
Mirat Sarsembayev (KAZ)	4
Tulashboy Doniyorov (UZB)	6
Jitender Kumar (IND)	13
Juan Carlos Payano (DOM)	4
Vincenzo Picardi (ITA)	8
Walid Cherif (TUN)	11
Lee Ok-Sung (KOR)	5
Samir Mammadov (AZE)	2
Somjit Jongjohor (THA)	10
Robenílson de Jesus (BRA)	6
Anvar Yunusov (TJK)	12

Quarterfinals; Wednesday, August 20, 2008; 19:00-20:00
McWilliams Arroyo (PUR)	2
Andry Laffita (CUB)	11
Georgy Balakshin (RUS)	15
Jitender Kumar (IND)	11
Vincenzo Picardi (ITA)	7
Walid Cherif (TUN)	5
Somjit Jongjohor (THA)	8
Anvar Yunusov (TJK)	1

Semifinals; Friday, August 22, 2008; 13:30-14:00
Andry Laffita (CUB)	9
Georgy Balakshin (RUS)	8
Vincenzo Picardi (ITA)	1
Somjit Jongjohor (THA)	7

Final; Saturday, August 23, 2008; 19:00-19:20
Andry Laffita (CUB)	2
Somjit Jongjohor (THA)	8

== See also ==
- 2009 World Amateur Boxing Championships – Flyweight
