= Somjit Jongjohor =

Thai boxer (born 1975)

Somjit Jongjohor TCh TBh ChM
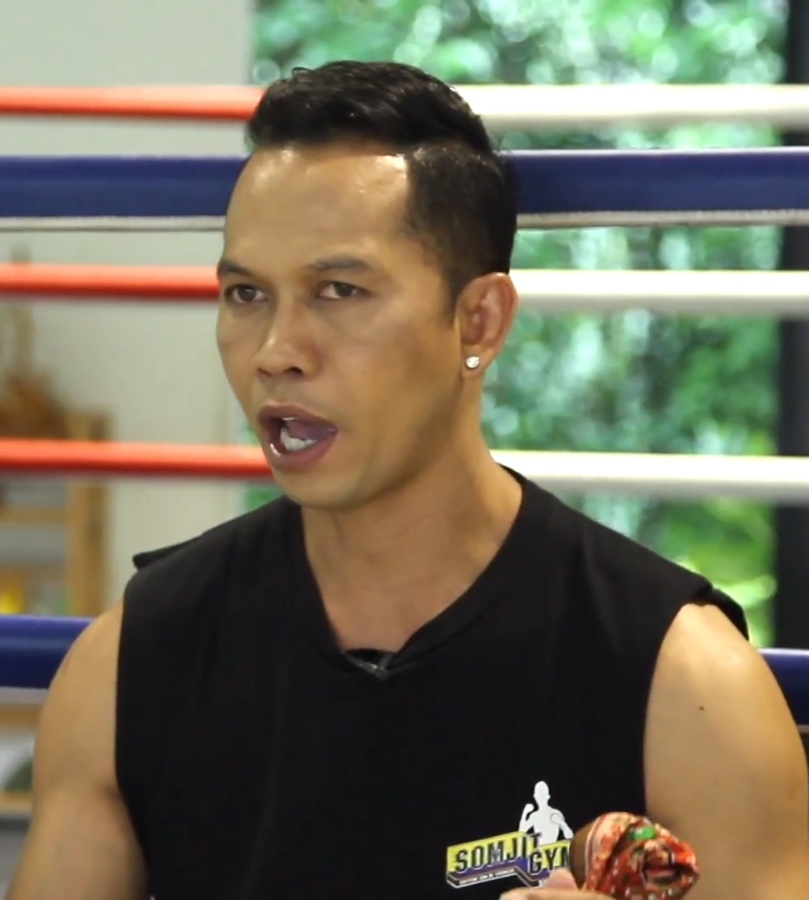
- Somjit Jongjohor

Personal information
- Full name: สมจิตร จงจอหอ
- Nationality: Thailand
- Born: January 19, 1975 (age 51) Nakhon Ratchasima, Thailand
- Education: Sukhothai Institute of Physical
- Height: 1.67 m (5 ft 6 in)
- Weight: 51 kg (112 lb)

Sport
- Sport: Boxing
- Weight class: Flyweight
- Club: Royal Thai Army
Medal record
Olympic Games
Gold medal – first place	2008 Beijing	Flyweight
World Amateur Championships
Gold medal – first place	2003 Bangkok	Flyweight
Silver medal – second place	2007 Chicago	Flyweight
Asian Games
Gold medal – first place	2002 Busan	Flyweight
Silver medal – second place	2006 Doha	Flyweight
Asian Championships
Gold medal – first place	2002 Seremban	Flyweight
Bronze medal – third place	2004 Puerto Princesa	Flyweight

Somjit Jongjohor (Thai: สมจิตร จงจอหอ, RTGS: Somchit Chongchoho, pronounced [sǒm.t͡ɕìt t͡ɕōŋ.t͡ɕɔ̄ː.hɔ̌ː]; born January 19, 1975) is an amateur Thai boxer best known for winning gold medals in the flyweight division at the 2003 World Amateur Boxing Championships and at the Beijing 2008 Olympics.

== Early life and personal life ==
He was born in Cho Ho subdistrict, Mueang Nakhon Ratchasima district, Nakhon Ratchasima province, but grew up in Non Suwan district, in Buriram, a nearby province.

In Muay thai his name was Silachai Wor preecha (Thai: ศิลาชัย ว.ปรีชา). Weerapon Jongjoho, the middleweight bronze medalist in 2021 World Championships, is his nephew.

== Career ==
Somjit won the Asian Games 2002.

In the 2003 World Amateur Boxing Championships final in his home country he beat Frenchman Jérôme Thomas, who went on to win Olympic silver in 2004.

At the Olympics 2004, Somjit had bad luck with the draw and was outpointed by Cuban eventual winner Yuriorkis Gamboa.

At the 2005 World Amateur Boxing Championships he was surprised in his first match by Cuban southpaw Andry Laffita and lost 14:16. In 2005 he also competed for Thailand at the Boxing World Cup in Moscow, Russia, winning both his matches in the preliminary round.

He won silver at the 2006 Asian Games in the Flyweight (-51 kg) division when he was upset by Filipino boxer Violito Payla 15–31. He had beaten the Filipino three times before.

He beat Vincenzo Picardi to reach the finals in the 2007 World Amateur Boxing Championships where he lost against local southpaw Raushee Warren.

He represented Thailand in the Beijing 2008 Olympics Flyweight category and said that it would be his last contest after which he would continue his boxing career as a national team coach.

He won his first gold medal in the Beijing 2008 Olympics Flyweight category 51 kg defeating Andry Laffita of Cuba 8–2.

=== Olympic games results ===
2004 (as a flyweight)

- Defeated Kim Ki-Suk (South Korea) 22–12
- Lost to Yuriorkis Gamboa (Cuba) 21–26

2008 (as a flyweight)

- Defeated Eddie Valenzuela (Guatemala) 6–1
- Defeated Samir Mammadov (Azerbaijan) 10–2
- Defeated Anvar Yunusov (Tajikistan) 8–1
- Defeated Vincenzo Picardi (Italy) 7–1
- Defeated Andry Laffita (Cuba) 8–2

=== World amateur championships results ===
2003 (as a flyweight)

- Defeated Ramazan Ballioglu (Turkey) RSCO 3
- Defeated Bato-Munko Vankeev (Belarus) 10–5
- Defeated Yuriorkis Gamboa (Cuba) 23–22
- Defeated Rustamhodza Rahimov (Germany) 12–5
- Defeated Jerome Thomas (boxer) (France) 24–17

2005 (as a flyweight)

- Lost to Andry Laffita (Cuba) 14–16

2007 (as a flyweight)

- Defeated Ramadan Rezgallah (Egypt) 17–9
- Defeated Mirat Sarsembayev (Kazakhstan) 17–8
- Defeated Rafał Kaczor (Poland) 15–3
- Defeated Vincenzo Picardi (Italy) 13–2
- Lost to Rau'shee Warren (United States) 9-13 (final match)

== Muay Thai record ==
Muay Thai Record
Date	Result	Opponent	Event	Location	Method	Round	Time
1996-09-05	Win	(Thailand) Pairojnoi Sor.Siamchai	Rajadamnern Stadium	Bangkok, Thailand	Decision	5	3:00
1995-04-17	NC	(Thailand) Neungsiam Fairtex	Rajadamnern Stadium	Bangkok, Thailand	Ref.stop. (Somjit dismissed)		
1995-03-13	Win	(Thailand) Pairojnoi Sor.Siamchai	Rajadamnern Stadium	Bangkok, Thailand	Decision	5	3:00
1994-12-02	Loss	(Thailand) Nuengpichit Sityodtong	Lumpinee Stadium	Bangkok, Thailand	KO (Punch)	4	
1993-12-07	Loss	(Thailand) Plathong Jockygym	Ruomnamchai Wangkan Muay, Lumpinee Stadium	Bangkok, Thailand	Decision	5	3:00
1993-10-18	Loss	(Thailand) Nongnarong Luksamrong	Rajadamnern Stadium	Bangkok, Thailand	Decision	5	3:00
1993-07-27	Win	(Thailand) Singsamphan Kiatsingnoi	Onesongchai, Lumpinee Stadium	Bangkok, Thailand	Decision	5	3:00
1993-06-21	NC	(Thailand) Phuwanai Sakmethee	Kiatsingnoi + Chaturong14, Lumpinee Stadium	Bangkok, Thailand	Ref.stop. (Phuwanai dismissed)	5	
1993-03-29	Win	(Thailand) Saksri Yutthakit	Kiatsingnoi + Chaturong14, Rajadamnern Stadium	Bangkok, Thailand	Decision	5	3:00
1993-01-19	Win	(Thailand) Chaiyai Sitkaruhat		Bangkok, Thailand	Decision	5	3:00
1992-08-29	Win	(Thailand) Khumthap Petchmuangkon		Bangkok, Thailand	Decision	5	3:00
1992-04-27	Win	(Thailand) Chamuaklek Lukchaosuan	Kiatsingnoi, Rajadamnern Stadium	Bangkok, Thailand	Decision	5	3:00
Legend: Win Loss Draw/No contest Notes

== Discography ==
=== TV Dramas ===
Year	Thai title	Title	Role	Network	Notes	With
2008	ละครเทิดพระเกียรติ เรื่อง ปิดทองหลังพระ ตอน ความฝันอันสูงสุด			Channel 9		
2010	เหนือเมฆ			3HD33		
2010	นักสู้พันธุ์ข้าวเหนียว			7HD35		
2011	ตะวันเดือด	Tawan Dueat	Somjai สมใจ	3HD33		
2012	รักออกอากาศ		Michael ไมเคิล	3HD33		
2012	เหนือเมฆ 2 มือปราบจอมขมังเวทย์	Nuer Mek 2	Ja Wan จ่าหวาน	3HD33		
2013	รักข้ามเส้น		Cham ฉ่ำ	3HD33		
2013	ชาติเจ้าพระยา		Dech เดช	3HD33		
2014	ลูกผู้ชายหัวใจเข้ม		Nan-in หนานอิน	7HD35		
2015	ลิเกหมัดสั่ง		Chanp แชมป์	Channel 8		
2015	เพลงรักเพลงลำ		Na Bou Peion น้าบัวเผื่อน	7HD35		
2015	สาวน้อยอ้อยควั่น		Samlee สำลี	7HD35		
2016	ชาติพยัคฆ์		Tiang เที่ยง	3HD33		
2016	มือปราบสายเดี่ยว		Kroo Sing ครูสิงห์	3HD33		
2016	ลูกผู้ชายเลือดเดือด		Ja Ying จ่ายิ่ง	3SD28		
2017	เชลยศึก		Yoi ย้อย	Channel 8		
2018	คุณชายไก่โต้ง		Somjit สมจิตร	7HD35		
2018	แม่สื่อจอมป่วน		Jod จ๊อด	7HD35		
2018	ประกาศิตกามเทพ		Au อู๋	3HD33		
2020	กาเหว่า		Bunton บุญโทน	7HD35		
2020	วาสนารัก		Kroo Sakda ครูศักดา	3HD33		
2021	มนต์รักหนองผักกะแยง		Kroo Somsak ครูสมศักดิ์	3HD33		
2021	ภูผาผีคุ้ม		Pee Am ผีอ่ำ	One 31		
2022	สัจจะในชุมโจร	Satja Nai Chum Joan	Dab Poradok จ่าดับ โพระดก	Channel 7		
2023	ข้าวเหนียวทองคำ	Khao Niao Thong Kham	Thongdee ทองดี	One 31		
20	วิญญาณแพศยา	Winyan Patsaya		Channel 8		
20	มวยสะดิ้ง หมัดซิ่ง สายฟ้า			Channel 8		

=== TV Series ===
Year	Thai title	Title	Role	Network	Notes	With
2012	หมวดโอภาส เดอะซีรีส์ปี 2			Channel 9	รับเชิญตอน หักเหลี่ยมพี่บิ๊ก1	
2016	ส้มตำแฮมเบอร์เกอร์		An อั๋น	True4U		
2016	Journey The Series ตอน อีสานแซ่บนัว			3HD33	รับเชิญ	
2017	A Love To Kill รักซ่อนแค้น		Bar Cod บาร์โค้ด	One 31		
2017	Bangkok รัก Stories ตอน คนมีเสน่ห์	Bangkok Love Stories Season 1 Khon Mi Sa-ne (คนมีเสน่ห์)	Toy ต๋อย	GMM 25		
2018	My Hero วีรบุรุษสุดที่รัก เส้นสนกลรัก		Na Sawai น้าไสว	3HD33		
2019	สู้ตาย!!นายกระจับ		Hia Pon เฮียพล	LINE TV		
2020	ชุมชนสมหวัง หมู่ 8			YouTube:สมหวัง เงินสั่งได้		

=== TV Sitcom ===
Year	Thai title	Title	Role	Network	Notes	With
2008	เทวดาสาธุ รับเชิญตอน เธอผู้ไม่แพ้			Channel 3		
2011	ระเบิดเถิดเทิง			5HD1	รับเชิญ	
2013	เป็นต่อ ขั้นเทพ		Himself	GMM ONE	รับเชิญ	
2018	รักล้นๆ คนเต็มบ้าน			One 31		
2019	สุภาพบุรุษสุดซอย		Kiattikorn Rungrieng (Aid) เกียรติกร รุ่งเรือง (อิ๊ด)	One 31	รับเชิญ	

=== Film ===
Year	Thai title	Title	Role	Note	Reference
2010	บุญชู จะอยู่ในใจเสมอ		Pingwang ปิงวัง		
2011	รายการ ดาราการ์ตูน				

=== Master of Ceremony: MC ON TV ===
Year	Thai title	Title	Network	Notes	With
2010-2019	ไทยไฟต์	Thai Fight	3HD33		
2020-	ไทยไฟต์	Thai Fight	8HD27		
2014	อึ้ง ทึ่ง เสียว		8HD27		
2021	ศึกท่อน้ำไทย ลุมพินี ทีเคโอ เกียรติเพชร		PPTVHD36		
2021	เตะสู้ฝัน		7HD35		

=== Director of the program ===
Year	Thai title	Title	Network	Notes	With
2010-2018	กิ๊กดู๋ สงครามเพลง เงินล้าน		7HD35		
2019–present	กิ๊กดู๋ สงครามเพลงเงินล้าน		PPTVHD36		
