= Andrey Balanov =

Russian boxer

Medal record

Representing Russia

Men's Boxing

European Amateur Championships
Gold medal – first place	2006 Plovdiv	Welterweight

World Cup
Gold medal – first place	2005 Moscow	Welterweight

Andrey Vladimirovich Balanov (Russian: Андрей Владимирович Баланов) (born April 27, 1976 in Podolsk) is a former Russian boxer best known for winning the 2006 European Amateur Boxing Championships at welterweight, being part of the Russian 2005 team at the Boxing World Cup and competing at the 2008 Summer Olympics.

== Career ==
In 2005 he was part of the Russian team that won the 2005 Boxing World Cup.

At the 2005 World Amateur Boxing Championships he exited early against eventual Cuban winner Erislandi Lara.

At the Euros 2006 he beat Oleksandr Stretskyy from Ukraine in the semifinals and Bulgarian Spas Genov in the final 30:12.

At the 2007 World Amateur Boxing Championships he again beat Olexandr Stretskiy but was upset by Thai Non Boonjumnong.

At the first Olympic qualifier 2008 he was upset by English teenager Billy Joe Saunders, at the second he lost to Frenchman Jaoid Chiguer but barely qualified by defeating Samuel Matevosyan. In Beijing he lost in his second bout to Demetrius Andrade.
