= Andry Laffita =

Cuban boxer (born 1978)

Personal information
- Full name: Andry Laffita Fernández
- Born: March 26, 1978 (age 48) Pinar del Río, Cuba
Medal record
Men's Boxing
Representing Cuba
Olympic Games
Silver medal – second place	2008 Beijing	Flyweight
World Amateur Championships
Silver medal – second place	2005 Mianyang	Flyweight
World Cup
Silver medal – second place	2005 Moscow	Flyweight
Silver medal – second place	2008 Moscow	Flyweight

Andry Laffita Hernández (born March 26, 1978) is a retired Cuban amateur boxer. He won the silver medal at the 2005 World Amateur Boxing Championships. He also won a silver medal in the flyweight class, at the 2008 Olympic Games in Beijing.

== Career ==
In 1996 Laffita won the world junior championship.

Laffita rose to prominence after Olympic champion Yuriorkis Gamboa moved out of his weight class. During the 2005 World Amateur Boxing Championships in Mianyang, China Laffita defeated Somjit Jongjohor, Violito Payla, Juan Carlos Payano, Jérôme Thomas and Mirat Sarsembayev to reach the final. He lost to Lee Ok-Sung, winning the silver medal.

In 2006 and 2007 he was beaten by compatriot Yoandri Salinas in the national championships. After Salinas moved up in weight class, Laffita finally claimed the championship in 2008 vs Alexei Collado.

Laffita beat Braulio Ávila by a razor-thin countback decision in the semifinals of the regional qualifying tournament in 2008. He lost to Juan Carlos Payano in the final, although both had already qualified for the Games. At the 2008 Summer Olympics, Laffita won the silver medal, losing in the final to Thai boxer Somjit Jongjohor.

=== World Amateur Championships ===
- 2005 (as a flyweight)
  - Defeated Somjit Jongjohor (Thailand) 16–14
  - Defeated Jérôme Thomas (France) 29–15
  - Defeated Violito Payla (Philippines) RSCO
  - Defeated Juan Carlos Payano (Dominican Republic) 31–22
  - Defeated Mirat Sarsembayev (Kazakhstan) 29–16
  - Lost to Lee Ok-Sung (South Korea) 22-33 (final match)

=== World Cup ===
- 2005 (as a flyweight)
  - Lost to Somjit Jongjohor (Thailand) 24–+24
  - Lost to Mirzhan Rakhimzhanov (Kazakhstan) 28–40
  - Defeated Georgy Balakshin (Russia) 36–22

=== Olympic Games ===
- 2008 (as a flyweight)
  - 1st round bye
  - Defeated Khalid Yafai (Great Britain) 9–3
  - Defeated McWilliams Arroyo (Puerto Rico) 11–2
  - Defeated Georgy Balakshin (Russia) 9–8
  - Lost to Somjit Jongjohor 2-8 (final match)
