= Ali Aliyev (boxer) =

Russian boxer

Ali Aliyev Али Алиев
Personal information
- Nationality: Russian
- Born: 2 June 1983 (age 43) Rugudzha, Dagestan ASSR, Russian SFSR, Soviet Union
- Weight: Bantamweight

Boxing career
Medal record
Representing Russia
Men's amateur boxing
European Championships
Gold medal – first place	2006 Plovdid	Bantamweight
World Cup
Silver medal – second place	2006 Baku	Bantamweight

Ali Magomedovich Aliyev (Russian: Али Магомедович Алиев; born 2 June 1983) is a Russian amateur boxer who won a gold medal at the 2006 European Championships in 2006 and silver at the 2006 World Cup.
