= Islam Timurziev =

Russian boxer

Personal information
- Born: 9 January 1983
- Died: 31 August 2015 (aged 32)
Medal record
Men's Boxing
Representing Russia
European Amateur Championships
Gold medal – first place	2006 Plovdiv	Super Heavyweight
World Amateur Championships
Bronze medal – third place	2007 Chicago	Super Heavyweight
World Cup
Gold medal – first place	2005 Moscow	Super Heavyweight

Islam Yahyayevich Timurziev (Russian: Ислам Яхьяевич Тимурзиев; 9 January 1983 – 31 August 2015) was a Russian amateur boxer, best known for winning gold in the 2006 European Amateur Boxing Championships.

== Career ==
Born in Nazran, Ingushetia, Timurziev started boxing in 1996. He was a skilled offensive fighter with impressive power in both hands but had defensive weaknesses. He won the U-17 European Championship in 1999, and the Junior European Championships in 2001.

He added the military world title in 2003, and won the 2004 Russian national title, but only after he helped his national team winning the Nations World Cup by beating Cuban Odlanier Solis (Olympic Champion at 201 lbs) on points. Later that year while he was out with cancer, his compatriot Roman Romanchuk participated in the world championships.

In 2006, Timurziev made a comeback claiming the European title with wins over Roberto Cammarelle, Kubrat Pulev and Robert Helenius. At the World Cup in Baku, Timurziev was pulled out by his corner in a rematch by his nemesis Odlanier Solis. This also granted Cuba a 6–5 win of the cup.

Timurziev was in bad form early on in 2007, losing in the Russian championships against the unsung Denis Sergeev (19:22).

But at the 2007 World Amateur Boxing Championships in Chicago he reached the semi-finals among others with several first round wins and a points victory over American Michael Hunter. He was unable to advance further, suffering from acute appendicitis, thus granting Roberto Cammarelle a win on walkover, and earning the bronze medal.

Timurziev was regarded as the favorite at the 2008 Beijing Olympics in his weightclass as the Cubans were lacking a star in this class after Solis had defected. He was defeated though by Great Britain's David Price through a knockout in the second round.

He died in hospital of sepsis on 31 August 2015, following a long illness.
