= Odlanier Solís =

Cuban boxer (born 1980)

Personal information
- Nickname: La Sombra ("The Shadow")
- Born: Odlanier Solís Fonte; 5 April 1980 (age 46) Havana, Cuba
- Height: 6 ft 1 1/2 in (187 cm)
- Weight: Heavyweight

Boxing career
- Reach: 79 in (201 cm)
- Stance: Orthodox

Boxing record
- Total fights: 25
- Wins: 22
- Win by KO: 14
- Losses: 3
Medal record
Men's amateur boxing
Representing Cuba
Event	1st	2nd	3rd
Olympic Games	1	0	0
World Championships	3	0	0
Pan American Games	2	0	0
World Cup	0	1	0
Goodwill Games	1	0	0
Total	7	1	0
Olympic Games
Gold medal – first place	2004 Athens	Heavyweight
World Championships
Gold medal – first place	2001 Belfast	Heavyweight
Gold medal – first place	2003 Bangkok	Heavyweight
Gold medal – first place	2005 Mianyang	Super heavyweight
Pan American Games
Gold medal – first place	1999 Winnipeg	Heavyweight
Gold medal – first place	2003 Santo Domingo	Heavyweight
World Cup
Silver medal – second place	2005 Moscow	Super heavyweight
Goodwill Games
Gold medal – first place	2001 Brisbane	Heavyweight

Odlanier Solís Fonte (born 5 April 1980) is a Cuban former professional boxer who competed from 2007 to 2016. He challenged once for the WBC heavyweight title in 2011. As an amateur, he won a gold medal at the 2004 Olympics; 2001, 2003, and 2005 World Championships; 1999, and 2003 Pan American; and 2001 Goodwill Games.

== Amateur career ==
His first international success was in 1998, winning the title at the Pan American Juniors championship in Toluca and the Juniors World championship in Buenos Aires.

In 1999 he won the Cuban championship beating Félix Savón. Until 2004 he defended his title five times consecutively.

In 2005 he switched from heavyweight to super heavyweight and lost in the final to Michel López Núñez. In 2006 he won the title again for a seventh time.

He was part of the Cuban team that won the 2006 Boxing World Cup.

His record was 227 victories, 14 losses. He never lost at a major event (world championships, Olympics) and beat fellow Cuban Félix Savón in two of their three fights. One of those fights was in the Cuban Olympic boxing trial finals in 2000, and the win normally would have allowed Solis to fight in Sydney. Savon, however, was the two-time defending Olympic champion and a gold medal would have equaled the record that László Papp of Hungary and countryman Teófilo Stevenson set with three consecutive boxing gold medals. Thus, Savon was given the spot over Solis, who did not participate in the Olympics at all.

=== World Championships ===
Solís became world champion in 2001 in Belfast and in 2003 in Bangkok at heavyweight (201 lbs/91 kg limit), in 2005 in Mianyang at super heavyweight.

In 2001 he beat Russian Olympic silver medalist of 2000 Sultan Ibragimov in the semifinals on points and in the final British David Haye by TKO. Haye gave Solis a standing eight count in the first round and was up by 7 points, but Solis came back strong, turned the score around in the second round and won the fight by stoppage in the third. At the time of stoppage, score was 31–17 in favour of Solis.

In 2003 he won on points in the final against Russian archrival Aleksandr Alekseyev who would win the next world championship. Also, Solis defeated Sultan Ibragimov once more (13-7) in four rounds in the XXXIII Chemistry Cup in Halle, Germany, on March 10, 2002.

=== Olympic Games ===
Solis earned a spot on the Cuban Olympic boxing team for the 2004 Summer Olympics in Athens and succeeded the three-time champion Savon as the heavyweight gold medalist.

=== Amateur highlights ===
==== Olympic Games ====
- (gold) 2004 in Athens, Greece (heavyweight)
  - Defeated Aleksandr Alekseyev (Russia) 24–21
  - Defeated Wilmer Vasquez (Venezuela) 24–4
  - Defeated Naser Al Shami (Syria) RSC–3 (1:29)
  - Defeated Viktar Zuyev (Belarus) 22–13

==== World Cup ====
- (silver) 2005 in Moscow, Russia (heavyweight)
  - Defeated Ilgar Mamedov (Azerbaijan) RSC–2
  - Defeated Georgel Gavril (Romania) RSC–3
  - Defeated Mukhtarkhan Dildabekov (Kazakhstan) 27–20
  - Lost to Islam Timurziev (Russia) 26–27

==== Pan American Games ====
- (gold) 1999 in Winnipeg, Canada (heavyweight)
  - Defeated Angus Lewis (Virgin Island) walk-over
  - Defeated Livin Castillo (Ecuador) 14–2
  - Defeated Marcelino Novaes (Brazil) 13–2
  - Defeated Mark Simmons (Canada) 4–2
- (gold) 2003 in Winnipeg, Canada (heavyweight)
  - Defeated Gerardo Bisbal (Puerto Rico) RSCH-2
  - Defeated Jason Douglas (Canada) 16–2
  - Defeated Kertson Manswell (Trinidad & Tobago) 15–3

==== World Junior Championships ====
- (gold) 1998 in Buenos Aires, Argentina (heavyweight)
  - Defeated Steffen Kretschmann (Germany) 8–1
  - Defeated Evgeniy Arkhipov (Russia) 8–2
  - Defeated Sebastian Ceballos (Argentina) 7–5

==== Others ====
- Three times World Senior Champion (2001, 2003, 2005)
- Six time Cuban National Champion (1999–2004)
- Chemiepokal – 2002, 2003, 2004
- Central American and Caribbean Championships – 1999
- Pan American Boxing Championships – 2005

==== Notable defeated fighters ====
- Cubans: Felix Savón (2 wins, 1 loss), Robert Alfonso 3 wins, Michel López Núñez (3 wins, 3 losses), Osmay Acosta (RSC), Yoan Pablo Hernández (2 wins) TKO & 10-1.
- Non-Cubans: Islam Timurziev (1 win, 1 loss), Roman Romanchuk (1 win, 2 losses), Vyacheslav Glazkov (1 win), Kubrat Pulev (2 wins, 1 loss), Sultan Ibragimov (2 wins), David Haye (1 win).

Solís finished his amateur career with a record of 227 wins, 14 losses.

== Defection ==
He defected from the national Cuban boxing team in December 2006, during training in Venezuela for the Pan-American Games in Rio de Janeiro. With him, came two fellow amateurs and reigning Olympic champions, Yan Barthelemí Varela and Yuriorkis Gamboa Toledano. After escaping to Colombia, they arrived in Miami. Solís, who plans to reside in Germany, signed a professional promotional contract with German-based First Artist.

== Professional career ==
Solís made his professional debut on 27 April 2007, weighing in at a much higher weight at 250+ lbs than as an amateur (where he weighed at a solid 200 lbs) but knocked out 32–7 veteran Andreas Sidon 47 seconds into the first round. In the next 18 months he racked up an 11–0 record against creditable opposition at this stage of a professional career, and in October 2008 he defeated Chauncy Welliver for the WBC international heavyweight title.

=== Solís vs. Barrett ===
Solis fighting out of Miami, Florida, made his third successful defense of the WBC International Heavyweight title with a second round stoppage of Monte Barrett of Queens, New York. Solis, now 15–0 with 11 KOs, a Cuban defector with an extensive amateur career, fought a very cautious first as a careful counterpuncher, preferring to feel out the experienced Barrett, age 38, 34–8, 20 KOs, to see if he had anything left. In the second, Solis opened up with a long left to Barrett's chin that decked him. Barrett just beat the count. In the barrage from Solis that followed, Barrett went down from a slip under pressure, got up, then got knocked out.

=== Solís vs. Drumond ===
On 20 March 2010, Solis fought and defeated Carl Davis Drumond by fourth-round TKO to retain his WBC International Heavyweight title and to win the WBA Fedelatin Heavyweight title. After toying with Drumond for the first three rounds Solis unleashed a barrage of punches during the last 20 second of round three and would have knocked Drumond down had he not been saved by the ropes, making Drumond not want to come out for the fourth round.

=== Solís vs. Vitali Klitschko ===
Solis defeated Ray Austin in a WBC title eliminator when Austin was disqualified in the 10th round. Solis connected with combinations to the head in the 10th, with Austin seemingly out on his feet and repeatedly holding Solis to avoid additional shots. The win set up Solis to fight Vitali Klitschko, becoming the mandatory challenger. On 11 January, it was official confirmed that the fight between Vitali Klitschko and Solís was going to take place in Cologne, Germany, on 19 March 2011. Both fighters promised a victory by knockout.

On 19 March 2011, the two boxers took to the ring in front of a sell-out crowd of over 19,000. In the first round of the fight, after the ten-second warning bell rang, Solis threw a left and right which didn't connect, to Klitschko's chin. Vitali Klitschko returned the favor with a short right to Solis's left temple. What followed has been extensively debated by fans and pundits. Some claim that as he was already falling to the ground, Solis injured his right knee while making an effort to prevent himself from hitting the ground. Others maintain that he simply injured his knee, while backpedalling, and was unable to continue. Some believe he was injured prior to the bout but didn't disclose it for fear of not getting paid. The slow motion shows that he was momentarily stunned by the almost grazing temple punch, and his foot froze to the canvas, whilst his leg and body continued backwards, causing an injury to his ankle. He was not able to continue and the fight was ruled a 1st rd KO.

=== Post Klitschko comeback ===
Solis launched a comeback following his rehabilitation from knee surgery and scored three consecutive victories over the next three years including points wins over Konstantin Airich and undefeated prospect Leif Larsen. Problematically though it seemed Solis had lost a certain amount of his punching power and foot speed.

=== Consecutive losses and decline ===
In 2015 Solis lost two consecutive bouts to former world title challenger, veteran, Tony Thompson. The first was by a close split decision and the second by TKO as Solis retired in his corner for reasons unknown midway through the bout. Since his losses to Thompson Solis has won two bouts against low level opposition. His current ranking according to boxrec is 42 in the world and there has been no speculation regarding a substantive ring return.

== Professional boxing record ==
25 fights	22 wins	3 losses
By knockout	14	2
By decision	7	1
By disqualification	1	0

No.	Result	Record	Opponent	Type	Round, time	Date	Location	Notes
25	Win	22–3	Aleksandar Todorovic	UD	8	17 Sep 2016	Göppingen, Germany	
24	Win	21–3	Milos Dovedan	KO	2 (6), 1:53	4 Aug 2016	ECB Boxgym, Hamburg, Germany	
23	Loss	20–3	Tony Thompson	RTD	8 (12), 3:00	27 Feb 2015	Gloria Sports Arena, Antalya, Turkey	For vacant WBC Continental Americas heavyweight title
22	Loss	20–2	Tony Thompson	SD	12	22 Mar 2014	Atatürk Spor Salonu, Tekirdağ, Turkey	For vacant WBC International heavyweight title
21	Win	20–1	Yakup Saglam	TKO	7 (12), 2:30	27 Jul 2013	Kugelbake-Halle, Cuxhaven, Germany	Retained IBF Inter-Continental heavyweight title
20	Win	19–1	Leif Larsen	UD	12	22 Mar 2013	Universal Hall, Berlin, Germany	Retained IBF Inter-Continental heavyweight title
19	Win	18–1	Konstantin Airich	UD	12	19 May 2012	Events Center, Pharr, Texas, U.S.	Won IBF Inter-Continental heavyweight title
18	Loss	17–1	Vitali Klitschko	KO	1 (12), 2:59	19 Mar 2011	Lanxess Arena, Cologne, Germany	For WBC heavyweight title
17	Win	17–0	Ray Austin	DQ	10 (12), 2:59	17 Dec 2010	American Airlines Arena, Miami, Florida, U.S.	Austin disqualified for hitting after the bell
16	Win	16–0	Carl Davis Drumond	RTD	3 (10), 3:00	20 Mar 2010	Mallory Square, Key West, Florida, U.S.	Retained WBA Fedelatin and WBC International and heavyweight titles
15	Win	15–0	Monte Barrett	TKO	2 (10), 1:54	10 Oct 2009	The Theater at Madison Square Garden, New York City, New York, U.S.	Retained WBC International heavyweight title
14	Win	14–0	Dominique Alexander	TKO	1 (8), 2:55	12 Jun 2009	Miccosukee Resort & Gaming, Miami, Florida, U.S.	
13	Win	13–0	Kevin Burnett	TKO	8 (10), 2:00	9 Jan 2009	Star of the Desert Arena, Primm, Nevada, U.S.	Retained WBC International heavyweight title; Won vacant WBA Fedelatin heavyweight title
12	Win	12–0	Chauncy Welliver	TKO	9 (12), 1:23	11 Oct 2008	O2 World Arena, Berlin, Germany	Won vacant WBC International heavyweight title
11	Win	11–0	Chad Van Sickle	TKO	1 (8), 1:32	12 Sep 2008	Kugelbake-Halle, Cuxhaven, Germany	
10	Win	10–0	Harry Duiven Jr.	UD	8	7 Jun 2008	Karl-Eckel-Weg Halle, Hattersheim am Main, Germany	
9	Win	9–0	Mamuka Jikurashvili	KO	2 (8), 1:34	26 Apr 2008	Spor Salonu, Trabzon, Turkey	
8	Win	8–0	Cisse Salif	UD	8	14 Mar 2008	Zenith, Munich, Germany	
7	Win	7–0	Adrian Rajkai	KO	3 (8)	29 Feb 2008	PalaLido, Milan, Italy	
6	Win	6–0	Julius Long	UD	8	23 Dec 2007	Maritim Hotel, Halle, Germany	Won vacant WBC Latino heavyweight title
5	Win	5–0	Jeremy Bates	TKO	2 (8), 0:18	19 Oct 2007	Estrel Hotel, Berlin, Germany	
4	Win	4–0	Marcus McGee	KO	2 (6), 2:14	21 Sep 2007	Hansehalle, Lübeck, Germany	
3	Win	3–0	Aldo Colliander	UD	4	6 Jul 2007	Arena Gym, Hamburg, Germany	
2	Win	2–0	Oleksiy Mazikin	KO	1 (4), 0:43	16 Jun 2007	Atatürk Sport Hall, Ankara, Turkey	
1	Win	1–0	Andreas Sidon	KO	1 (4), 0:47	27 Apr 2007	Arena Gym, Hamburg, Germany	

Sporting positions
Regional boxing titles
Vacant Title last held by Fres Oquendo	WBC Latino heavyweight champion 23 December 2007 – February 2008; Vacated	Vacant Title next held by Gonzalo Basile
Vacant Title last held by Juan Carlos Gómez	WBC International heavyweight champion 11 October 2008 – December 2010; Vacated	Vacant Title next held by Bermane Stiverne
Vacant Title last held by Andrew Golota	WBA Fedelatin heavyweight champion 9 January 2009 – December 2010; Vacated	Vacant Title next held by Bermane Stiverne
Preceded by Konstantin Airich	IBF Inter-Continental heavyweight champion 19 May 2012 – March 2014; Vacated	Vacant Title next held by Erkan Teper
