= Kakhaber =

Origin
- Word/name: Georgia

Kakhaber (Georgian: კახაბერ) is a Georgian masculine given name and refer to:

- Kakhaber Aladashvili (born 1983), Georgian footballer
- Kakhaber Gogichaishvili (born 1968), Georgian footballer
- Kakha Kaladze (born 1978), Georgian footballer
- Kakhaber Tskhadadze (born 1968), Georgian footballer
- Kakhaber Zhvania, Georgian boxer

== See also ==
- House of Kakhaberisdze
