= Matt Korobov =

Russian boxer (born 1983)

Matt Korobov Мэтт Коробов
Personal information
- Nationality: Russian; American
- Born: Matvey Georgiyevich Korobov; 7 January 1983 (age 43) Orotukan, Magadan Oblast, Russian SFSR, Soviet Union
- Height: 1.80 m (5 ft 11 in)
- Weight: Middleweight

Boxing career
- Reach: 179 cm (70 in)
- Stance: Southpaw

Boxing record
- Total fights: 33
- Wins: 28
- Win by KO: 14
- Losses: 4
- Draws: 1
Medal record
Representing Russia
Men's amateur boxing
World Championships
Gold medal – first place	2005 Mianyang	Middleweight
Gold medal – first place	2007 Chicago	Middleweight
European Championships
Gold medal – first place	2006 Plovdiv	Middleweight
World Cup
Gold medal – first place	2005 Moscow	Middleweight

Matvey Georgiyevich Korobov (Russian: Матвей Георгиевич "Мэтт" Коробов; born 7 January 1983) is a Russian-American professional boxer. He challenged once for the WBO middleweight title in 2014, as well as the WBC interim middleweight title in 2018 and the WBA interim middleweight title in 2019. As an amateur he won consecutive gold medals at the 2005 and 2007 World Championships, and gold at the 2005 Boxing World Cup; all in the middleweight division.

== Amateur career ==
Korobov won the European junior title in 2001. He became Russian champion in 2003 and 2004 but did not participate in the 2004 Summer Olympics as his country chose to send Gaydarbek Gaydarbekov, who had lost to him but eventually won Olympic gold.

He won the world championships in 2005 against Emilio Correa and the European Championships in 2006, defeating Oleksandr Usyk. He calls his World Cup win over Cuban Yordanis Despaigne the hardest fight of his amateur career, he helped to edge out a 6:5 team win.

In 2005 he was part of the Russian team that won the 2005 Boxing World Cup.

He once again won the world title by easily beating Sergiy Derevyanchenko and dominating Alfonso Blanco in 2007 by a score of PTS 29:4.

At the 2008 Summer Olympics he was off-form and was upset in his second bout by Bakhtiyar Artayev. He decided to turn pro afterwards. His record was 300-12.

=== World Amateur championship results ===
2005

- Defeated Dzhakhon Kurbanov (Tajikistan) RSC
- Defeated Jarrod Fletcher (Australia) RSC
- Defeated Darren Sutherland (Ireland) RSCO 3
- Defeated Emilio Correa (Cuba) 49-25
- Defeated Ismail Syllakh (Ukraine) RSCO 2

2007

- Defeated Francy Ntetu (Canada) RSC 3
- Defeated Hamyoun Amiri (Irán) RSCO 3
- Defeated Carlos Góngora (Ecuador) RSCO 3
- Defeated Wang Jianzheng (China) 22-3
- Defeated Sergiy Derevyanchenko (Ukraine) AB 2
- Defeated Alfonso Blanco (boxer) (Venezuela) 29-4

=== Olympic results ===
2008

- Defeated Naim Terbunja (Albania) 18-6
- Lost to Bakhtiyar Artayev (Kazakhstan) 7-10

== Professional career ==
In his first world title fight on 13 December 2014, Korobov faced Andy Lee for the vacant WBO middleweight title. Even though he was doing well for the first five rounds, the Russian would end up hurt and then knocked out in the sixth round, losing his opportunity to become a world champion for the first time in his career.

On 22 December 2018, WBC middleweight champion Jermall Charlo was slated to defend his belt against Willie Monroe Jr. However, Monroe Jr's VADA tests came out positive for a banned substance, which meant a new opponent for Charlo was in the works. Korobov ended up being the substitution and gave Charlo a very tough fight, however, was still unable to come out with the win. Korobov started the fight really strong, but gave up the latter part to the WBC champion.

After a controversial majority draw against Immanuwel Aleem, Korobov, WBA's number #3 at middleweight at the time would go on to fight WBA's #1, Chris Eubank Jr. for the vacant WBA interim middleweight title, which was also the final eliminator for the full WBA middleweight title. Korobov lost the fight by a second-round TKO after suffering an injury to his left shoulder.

Korobov retired from sports in 2023.

== Professional boxing record ==
33 fights	28 wins	4 losses
By knockout	14	3
By decision	14	1
Draws	1	

No.	Result	Record	Opponent	Type	Round, time	Date	Location	Notes
33	Loss	28–4–1	Ronald Ellis	RTD	4 (10), 3:00	12 Dec 2020	Mohegan Sun Arena, Montville, Connecticut, U.S.	
32	Loss	28–3–1	Chris Eubank Jr.	TKO	2 (12), 0:34	7 Dec 2019	Barclays Center, New York City, New York, U.S.	For vacant WBA interim middleweight title; Korobov unable to continue due to shoulder injury
31	Draw	28–2–1	Immanuwel Aleem	MD	10	11 May 2019	EagleBank Arena, Fairfax, Virginia, U.S.	
30	Loss	28–2	Jermall Charlo	UD	12	22 Dec 2018	Barclays Center, New York City, New York, U.S.	For WBC interim middleweight title
29	Win	28–1	Jonathan Batista	UD	6	2 Mar 2018	Airport Convention Center, Miami, Florida, U.S.	
28	Win	27–1	Scott Sigmon	UD	8	18 Nov 2016	Osceola Heritage Park, Kissimmee, Florida, U.S.	
27	Win	26–1	Brian Vera	UD	8	25 Jun 2016	The Bomb Factory, Dallas, Texas, U.S.	
26	Win	25–1	Josue Ovando	UD	8	16 Jan 2016	The Bomb Factory, Dallas, Texas, U.S.	
25	Loss	24–1	Andy Lee	TKO	6 (12), 1:10	13 Dec 2014	Cosmopolitan of Las Vegas, Paradise, Nevada, U.S.	For vacant WBO middleweight title
24	Win	24–0	José Uzcátegui	UD	10	28 Jun 2014	CenturyLink Center, Omaha, Nebraska, U.S.	Won vacant WBO Inter-Continental middleweight title
23	Win	23–0	Emil Gonzalez	RTD	6 (8), 3:00	19 Apr 2014	Bahia Shrine Temple, Orlando, Florida, U.S.	
22	Win	22–0	Derek Edwards	TKO	9 (10), 0:28	7 Dec 2013	Boardwalk Hall, Atlantic City, New Jersey, U.S.	
21	Win	21–0	Grady Brewer	UD	8	28 Sep 2013	StubHub Center, Carson, California, U.S.	
20	Win	20–0	Ossie Duran	KO	3 (8), 0:51	15 Jun 2013	American Airlines Center, Dallas, Texas, U.S.	
19	Win	19–0	Arturo Rodriguez	TKO	5 (8), 1:07	16 Feb 2013	Auditorio Fausto Gutierrez Moreno, Tijuana, Mexico	
18	Win	18–0	Milton Núñez	UD	8	27 Oct 2012	County Coliseum, El Paso, Texas, U.S.	
17	Win	17–0	Latif Mundy	KO	4 (8), 0:22	11 Nov 2011	Mandalay Bay Events Center, Paradise, Nevada, U.S.	
16	Win	16–0	Lester Gonzalez	UD	8	9 Jul 2011	Home Depot Center, Carson, California, U.S.	
15	Win	15–0	Marcos Primera	UD	6	23 Apr 2011	WinStar World Casino, Thackerville, Oklahoma, U.S.	
14	Win	14–0	Michael Walker	TKO	1 (8), 1:31	12 Mar 2011	MGM Grand Garden Arena, Paradise, Nevada, U.S.	
13	Win	13–0	Derrick Findley	UD	8	20 Nov 2010	WinStar World Casino, Thackerville, Oklahoma, U.S.	
12	Win	12–0	Anthony Greenidge	UD	8	11 Sep 2010	Pearl Concert Theater, Paradise, Nevada, U.S.	
11	Win	11–0	Joshua Snyder	UD	8	17 Apr 2010	Boardwalk Hall, Atlantic City, New Jersey, U.S.	
10	Win	10–0	Lamar Harris	TKO	1 (6), 1:05	13 Feb 2010	Las Vegas Hilton, Winchester, Nevada, U.S.	
9	Win	9–0	Ken Dunham	TKO	3 (6), 1:29	19 Dec 2009	Beeghly Center, Youngstown, Ohio, U.S.	
8	Win	8–0	James Winchester	UD	6	14 Nov 2009	MGM Grand Garden Arena, Paradise, Nevada, U.S.	
7	Win	7–0	Benjamin Diaz	KO	1 (4), 1:22	27 Jun 2009	Boardwalk Hall, Atlantic City, New Jersey, U.S.	
6	Win	6–0	Loren Myers	UD	4	13 Jun 2009	Madison Square Garden, New York City, New York, U.S.	
5	Win	5–0	Anthony Bartinelli	TKO	2 (4), 2:15	2 May 2009	MGM Grand Garden Arena, Paradise, Nevada, U.S.	
4	Win	4–0	Cory Jones	TKO	4 (4), 2:59	21 Feb 2009	Madison Square Garden, New York City, New York, U.S.	
3	Win	3–0	Roberto Florentino	KO	1 (4), 2:26	24 Jan 2009	Staples Center, Los Angeles, California, U.S.	
2	Win	2–0	Jason Wahr	TKO	1 (4), 2:52	13 Dec 2008	Boardwalk Hall, Atlantic City, New Jersey, U.S.	
1	Win	1–0	Mario Evangelista	TKO	3 (4), 2:01	1 Nov 2008	Mandalay Bay Events Center, Paradise, Nevada, U.S.	

Sporting positions
Regional boxing titles
Vacant Title last held by Patrick Nielsen	WBO Inter-Continental middleweight champion 28 June 2014 – October 2014; Vacated	Vacant Title next held by John Ryder
