= Jitender Kumar (boxer, born 1988) =

Indian boxer

Personal information
- Born: 18 July 1988 (age 38) Sisar, Haryana, India
- Height: 160 cm (5 ft 3 in)

Sport
- Sport: Boxing
- Weight class: Flyweight
Medal record
Men's Boxing
Representing India
Commonwealth Games
Bronze medal – third place	2006 Melbourne	Flyweight
Asian Championships
Bronze medal – third place	2007 Ulan Bator	Flyweight

Jitender Kumar (जितेंदर कुमार, born 18 July 1988) is an Indian flyweight boxer. He won the bronze medal in the flyweight category at the 2006 Commonwealth Games. He represented India at the 2008 Summer Olympics in Beijing.

== Career ==
At the 2006 Junior World Championships, he lost to future (2007) seniors world champion Sergey Vodopyanov. At the Commonwealth Games 2006 he lost his semifinal to eventual winner Don Broadhurst. At the 2nd Olympic qualifier he beat Noman Karim, lost his semi to Mirat Sarsembayev but won the all-important third place bout against Godfrey Castro 13:6 and qualified.

=== Beijing Olympics ===
At the 2008 summer Olympics, Jitender was pitted against Turkey's Ulas Furkan Memis in the round of 32. The referee stopped the contest in the third round of the bout when Jitender led 12–3. In the round of 16, he was up against Uzbek boxer Tulashboy Doniyorov. In an ill-tempered bout, Jitender outscored his opponent 13–6. However, his dream run at Beijing 2008 Olympics came to an end when he lost to Georgy Balakshin of Russia (11–15) in a tightly fought quarter finals match held at Workers Indoor Arena on 20 August 2008. Jitender had 9 stitches in his jaw during the quarterfinal. If blood came out then the referee would stop the match and this put him under tremendous pressure. He was coached by the Indian Boxing Coach Gurbaksh Singh Sandhu.

== See also ==
- Boxing at the 2008 Summer Olympics – Flyweight
- Akhil Kumar
- Vijender Kumar
