= Roman Romanchuk (boxer) =

Russian boxer (1979–2016)

Personal information
- Nationality: Ukraine (until 2000); Russia (since 2000)
- Born: 3 June 1979 Stryi, Lviv Oblast, Ukrainian SSR
- Died: 8 September 2016 (aged 37) Odesa, Ukraine

Sport
- Sport: Boxing
Medal record
Men's boxing
Representing Russia
World Amateur Championships
Silver medal – second place	2005 Mianyang	Super heavyweight
European Amateur Championships
Silver medal – second place	2006 Pula	Heavyweight
World Cup
Gold medal – first place	2005 Moscow	Heavyweight

Roman Romanovich Romanchuk (Russian: Роман Романович Романчук; 3 June 1979 – 8 September 2016) was a Ukrainian (until 2000) and Russian (since 2000) amateur boxer. He won silver at super heavyweight during the 2005 World Amateur Boxing Championships and helped the Russian team win the 2005 Boxing World Cup. He also had success as an amateur kickboxer.

== Biography ==
=== Career ===
Romanchuk was born in Stryi, Lviv Oblast, Ukrainian SSR, in 1979. Southpaw Romanchuk, whose father also was a successful amateur boxer, started to box in 1997. He later gained Russian citizenship in 2000. In 2002 and 2003, he finished second at 201 lbs in the national championships to fellow southpaw Aleksandr Alekseyev. He won the title in 2004 and 2006.

Romanchuk participated in the open weight class super heavyweight at the 2005 World Amateur Boxing Championships where he defeated Rustam Saidov and future world champion Roberto Cammarelle 34:27 in the semis but lost the final to Odlanier Solis whom he had beaten on other occasions. The same year he was part of the Russian team which won the 2005 Boxing World Cup.

Back at 201 lbs, he was sensationally upset at the 2006 European Amateur Boxing Championships by Ukrainian puncher Denis Poyatsika who managed to stop him in the final. In 2007, he surprisingly lost to his compatriot and fellow southpaw Rakhim Chakhkiev and could not go to the World Championships in Chicago.

=== Later life ===
On 28 July 2008, Romanchuk was arrested by the police in Vladivostok, Russia, for shooting a man in the eye in a drunken fight. He was convicted of "murder committed with excessive force in self-defense" and sentenced to 1 year 6 months of imprisonment on 27 March 2009. According to the judge, the victim, 22-year-old Oleg Meshkov, attacked Romanchuk, but Romanchuk went beyond self-defense when he took the Osa non-lethal pistol from Meshkov, shot him in the face and punched and kicked him in the head. His conviction was overturned on appeal on 28 July 2009 and at the time of his death he was facing a second trial.

Romanchuk died of a heart attack on 8 September 2016 at the age of 37.

== Titles ==
Boxing

- 2006 E.A.B.A. European Amateur Boxing Championships in Plovdiv, Bulgaria (silver) +91 kg
- 2005 A.I.B.A. World Amateur Boxing Championships in Mianyang, China (silver) +91 kg
- 2005 Boxing World Cup in Moscow, Russia (gold) -91 kg (team event)

Kickboxing

- 2001 W.A.K.O. World Championships in Belgrade, Serbia & Montenegro (bronze) –81 kg (full-contact)
