= Alexey Shaydulin =

Bulgarian boxer

Medal record

Representing Bulgaria

World Amateur Championships
Silver medal – second place	2005 Mianyang	Featherweight

European Amateur Championships
Bronze medal – third place	2006 Plovdiv	Featherweight

EU Amateur Championships
Gold medal – first place	2004 Madrid	Featherweight
Gold medal – first place	2005 Cagliari	Featherweight
Bronze medal – third place	2006 Pécs	Featherweight

Alexey Shaydulin (also spelled Alexei Shajdulin; Bulgarian: Алексей Валериевич Шайдулин; born January 11, 1979) is a Bulgarian amateur boxer best known to win a silver medal at the World Championships 2005 and a bronze medal at the European Championships 2006 at featherweight.

== Career ==
At the 2006 European Amateur Boxing Championships in Plovdiv he lost the semifinal to Shahin Imranov. He failed to qualify for the 2004 Summer Olympics by ending up in third place at the 2nd AIBA European 2004 Olympic Qualifying Tournament in Warsaw, Poland.
