= Wang Jianzheng =

Chinese boxer

Personal information
- Full name: 王 建政
- Nationality: China
- Born: February 1, 1987 (age 39) Pingdu, Shandong
- Height: 1.85 m (6 ft 1 in)
- Weight: 75 kg (165 lb)

Sport
- Sport: Boxing
- Weight class: Middleweight
- Club: Shandong

Wang Jianzheng (born February 1, 1987) is a Chinese amateur boxer. He competed at the 2008 Olympics at middleweight.

At the World Championships, he beat three unknown fighters before running into superstar Matvey Korobov and losing 3:22. His placement ensured his qualification for the Olympics in his native country, though. There he lost his first bout against Serhiy Derevyanchenko.
