= 2006 European Amateur Boxing Championships =

Boxing competitions

- Host city: Plovdiv
- Country: Bulgaria
- Dates: 13–23 July

The Men's 2006 European Amateur Boxing Championships were held in Plovdiv, Bulgaria from July 13 to July 23. The 36th edition of this bi-annual competition was organised by the European governing body for amateur boxing, EABA.

== Medal winners ==
Event	Gold	Silver	Bronze
Light Flyweight (– 48 kilograms)	David Ayrapetyan; Russia	Alfonso Pinto; Italy	(North Macedonia) Mumin Veli; Macedonia Hovhannes Danielyan; Armenia
Flyweight (– 51 kilograms)	Georgi Balakshin; Russia	Samir Mammadov; Azerbaijan	Bato-Munko Vankeev; Belarus Jérôme Thomas; France
Bantamweight (– 54 kilograms)	Ali Aliyev; Russia	Detelin Dalakliev; Bulgaria	Mirsad Ahmeti; Croatia Zsolt Bedak; Hungary
Featherweight (– 57 kilograms)	Albert Selimov; Russia	Shahin Imranov; Azerbaijan	Stephen Smith; England Alexey Shaydulin; Bulgaria
Lightweight (– 60 kilograms)	Alexey Tishchenko; Russia	Hrachik Javakhyan; Armenia	Vazgen Safaryants; Belarus Olexandr Klyuchko; Ukraine
Light Welterweight (– 64 kilograms)	Boris Georgiev; Bulgaria	Oleg Komissarov; Russia	Ionut Gheorghe; Romania Gyula Kate; Hungary
Welterweight (– 69 kilograms)	Andrey Balanov; Russia	Spas Genov; Bulgaria	Oleksandr Stretskyy; Ukraine (Georgia (country)) Kahaber Jvania; Georgia
Middleweight (– 75 kilograms)	Matvey Korobov; Russia	Rahib Beylarov; Azerbaijan	Oleksandr Usyk; Ukraine Fundo Mhura; Scotland
Light Heavyweight (– 81 kilograms)	Artur Beterbiyev; Russia	Ismail Sillakh; Ukraine	(Republic of Ireland) Kenneth Egan; Ireland Constantin Bejenaru; Romania
Heavyweight (– 91 kilograms)	Denis Poyatsika; Ukraine	Roman Romanchuk; Russia	Elchin Alizade; Azerbaijan Alexander Povernov; Germany
Super Heavyweight (+ 91 kilograms)	Islam Timurziev; Russia	Robert Helenius; Finland	Kubrat Pulev; Bulgaria Kurban Gunebakan; Turkey

== Medal table ==
Rank	Nation	Gold	Silver	Bronze	Total
1	Russia (RUS)	9	2	0	11
2	Bulgaria (BUL)	1	2	2	5
3	Ukraine (UKR)	1	1	3	5
4	Azerbaijan (AZE)	0	3	1	4
5	Armenia (ARM)	0	1	1	2
6	Finland (FIN)	0	1	0	1
6	Italy (ITA)	0	1	0	1
8	Belarus (BLR)	0	0	2	2
8	Hungary (HUN)	0	0	2	2
8	Romania (ROU)	0	0	2	2
11	Croatia (CRO)	0	0	1	1
11	England (ENG)	0	0	1	1
11	France (FRA)	0	0	1	1
11	Georgia (GEO)	0	0	1	1
11	Germany (GER)	0	0	1	1
11	Ireland (IRL)	0	0	1	1
11	North Macedonia (MKD)	0	0	1	1
11	Scotland (SCO)	0	0	1	1
11	Turkey (TUR)	0	0	1	1
Totals (19 entries)		11	11	22	44
