= Artak Malumyan =

Armenian boxer

Medal record

Representing Armenia

Men's Boxing

World Amateur Championships
Bronze medal – third place	2005	Light Heavyweight

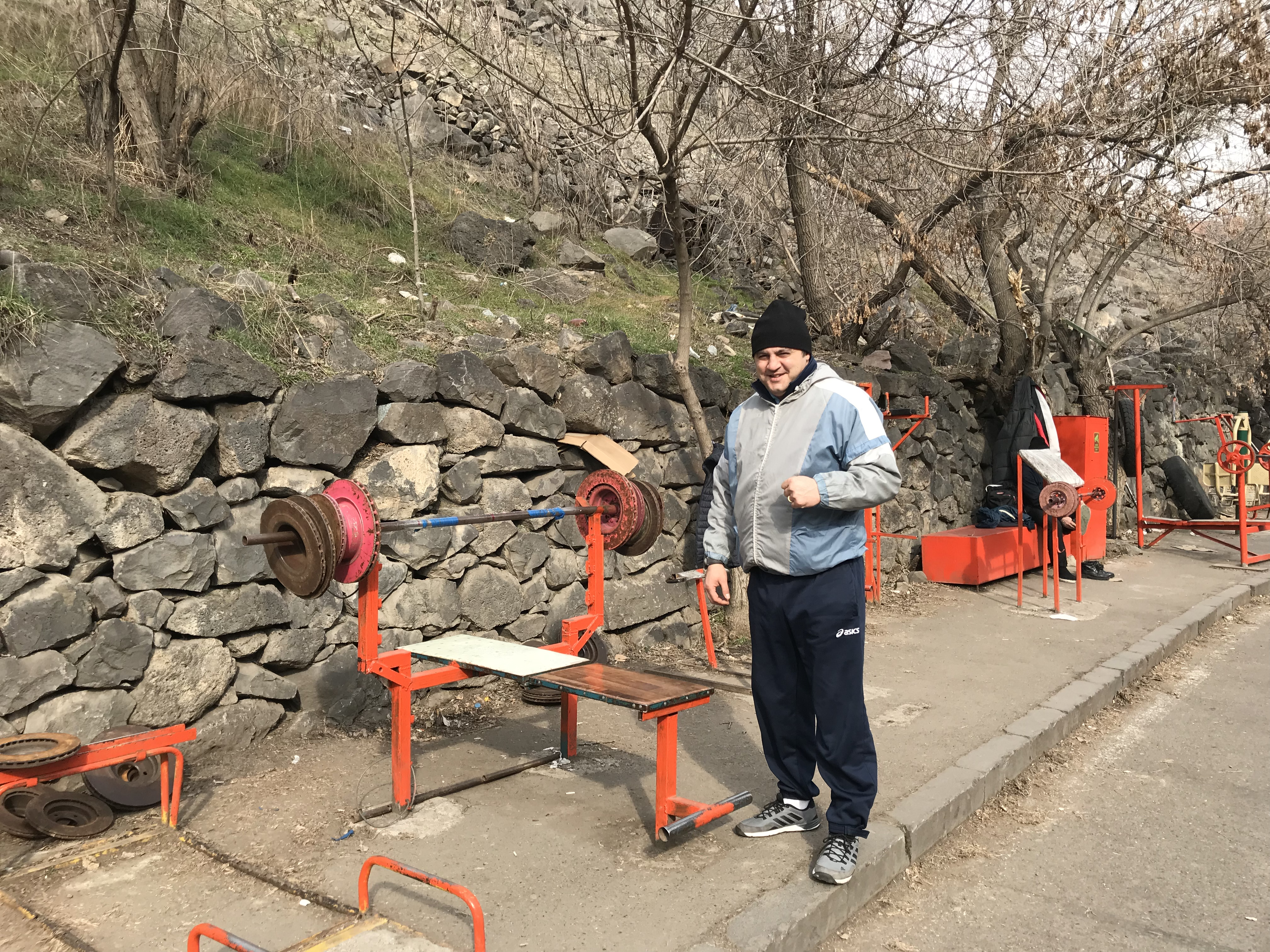

Artak Malumyan is an Armenian amateur boxer best known for coming in third at the 2005 World Amateur Boxing Championships in the Light Heavyweight category.
