= Georgy Balakshin =

Russian boxer (born 1980)

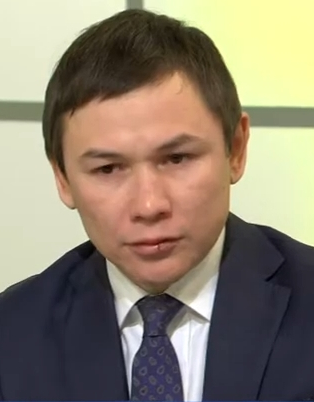
- Georgy Balakshin in November 2016

Personal information
- Full name: Георгий Русланович Балакшин
- Nationality: Russia
- Born: March 6, 1980 (age 46) Antonovka, Yakut ASSR, Russian SFSR, Soviet Union
- Height: 1.61 m (5 ft 3 in)
- Weight: 51 kg (112 lb)

Sport
- Sport: Boxing
- Weight class: Flyweight
- Club: Dynamo, Yakutsk
Medal record
Olympic Games
Bronze medal – third place	2008 Beijing	Flyweight
World Championships
Bronze medal – third place	2001 Belfast	Flyweight
European Championships
Gold medal – first place	2002 Perm	Flyweight
Gold medal – first place	2004 Pula	Flyweight
Gold medal – first place	2006 Plovdiv	Flyweight
Silver medal – second place	2011 Ankara	Flyweight
World Cup
Gold medal – first place	2005 Moscow	Flyweight

Georgy Ruslanovich Balakshin (Russian: Георгий Русланович Балакшин; born March 6, 1980, in Antonovka, near Nyurba, Sakha Republic) is an Olympic boxer from Russia best known for winning the European title three times.

== Career ==
Balakshin won the gold medal in 2002 and defended the crown at the 2004 European Amateur Boxing Championships in Pula. He participated in the 2004 Summer Olympics for his native Russia. There he was stopped in the quarterfinals of the Flyweight (51 kg) division by Cuba's eventual winner Yuriorkis Gamboa Toledano.

In 2005 he was part of the Russian team that won the 2005 Boxing World Cup.

In 2006, he once again won the European title. At the World championships 2007 he beat Frenchman Jérôme Thomas but lost to eventual winner Rau'shee Warren of America.

At the 2011 European Amateur Boxing Championships he won silver.

=== Olympic results ===
2004 (as a flyweight)

- Defeated Bonyx Yusak Saweho (Indonesia) 26–19
- Defeated Mirzhan Rakhimzhanov (Kazakhstan) 29–20
- Lost to Yuriorkis Gamboa (Cuba) 18–26

2008 (as a flyweight)

- 1st round bye
- Defeated Mirat Sarsembayev (Kazakhstan) 12–4
- Defeated Jitender Kumar (India) 15–11
- Lost to Andry Laffita (Cuba) 8–9

=== World amateur championships results ===
2003 (as a flyweight)

- Defeated Akhil Kumar (India) 26–16
- Defeated Hermensen Ballo (Indonesia) 22–8
- Lost to Alexander Vladimirov (Bulgaria) 24–33

2005 (as a flyweight)

- Defeated Bradley Hore (Australia) 25–11
- Defeated Atagun Yalcinkaya (Turkey) 36–15
- Lost to Rau'shee Warren (United States) 21–31

2007 (as a flyweight)

- Defeated Jérôme Thomas (France) 25–11
- Defeated Nurlan Aydarbek Ulu (Kyrgyzstan) RSCI 3
- Defeated Jitender Kumar (India) 14–9
- Lost to Rau'shee Warren (United States) 13–23

== Personal life ==
His former wife, Maria Balakshina (Yefimova), is a lawyer by education. They have a son, Dmitry, who is engaged in boxing and tennis.

He is currently married to Ekaterina Alekseeva, who is interested in fitness. The couple has two children, including their son Dan, who practices swimming, and a younger child.
