= 2005 Asian Amateur Boxing Championships =

Boxing competitions

2005 Asian Boxing Championships
- Host city: Ho Chi Minh City, Vietnam
- Dates: 29 August – 4 September 2005
- Main venue: Phan Đình Phùng Stadium

The 23rd edition of the Men's Asian Amateur Boxing Championships were held from August 29 to September 4, 2005 in Phan Đình Phùng Stadium, Ho Chi Minh City, Vietnam.

== Medal summary ==
| Event | Gold | Silver | Bronze |
|---|---|---|---|
| Light flyweight 48 kg | Harry Tañamor; Philippines | Hong Moo-won; South Korea | Suban Pannon; Thailand |
| Light flyweight 48 kg | Harry Tañamor; Philippines | Hong Moo-won; South Korea | Nguyễn Thế Hải; Vietnam |
| Flyweight; 51 kg | Lee Ok-sung; South Korea | Nauman Karim; Pakistan | Enkhbatyn Badar-Uugan; Mongolia |
| Flyweight; 51 kg | Lee Ok-sung; South Korea | Nauman Karim; Pakistan | Trần Quốc Việt; Vietnam |
| Bantamweight; 54 kg | Joan Tipon; Philippines | Otgonchuluuny Batkhüü; Mongolia | Mirzhan Rakhimzhanov; Kazakhstan |
| Bantamweight; 54 kg | Joan Tipon; Philippines | Otgonchuluuny Batkhüü; Mongolia | Thongtheang Khlongchan; Thailand |
| Featherweight; 57 kg | Mehrullah Lassi; Pakistan | Kim Song-guk; North Korea | Arenaldo Moniaga; Indonesia |
| Featherweight; 57 kg | Mehrullah Lassi; Pakistan | Kim Song-guk; North Korea | Kim Won-il; South Korea |
| Lightweight; 60 kg | Pichai Sayotha; Thailand | Noureddin Chegini; Iran | Marufjon Faizulloev; Tajikistan |
| Lightweight; 60 kg | Pichai Sayotha; Thailand | Noureddin Chegini; Iran | Jai Bhagwan; India |
| Light welterweight 64 kg | Asghar Ali Shah; Pakistan | Zhenis Nurgozhin; Kazakhstan | Mark Melligen; Philippines |
| Light welterweight 64 kg | Asghar Ali Shah; Pakistan | Zhenis Nurgozhin; Kazakhstan | Bayarjargalyn Bayanmönkh; Mongolia |
| Welterweight; 69 kg | Bakhyt Sarsekbayev; Kazakhstan | Aliasker Başirow; Turkmenistan | Reza Ghasemi; Iran |
| Welterweight; 69 kg | Bakhyt Sarsekbayev; Kazakhstan | Aliasker Başirow; Turkmenistan | Daiviin Otgonbayar; Mongolia |
| Middleweight; 75 kg | Jahon Qurbonov; Tajikistan | Cho Deok-jin; South Korea | Ryota Murata; Japan |
| Middleweight; 75 kg | Jahon Qurbonov; Tajikistan | Cho Deok-jin; South Korea | Sherzod Abdurahmonov; Uzbekistan |
| Light heavyweight 81 kg | Yerdos Zhanabergenov; Kazakhstan | Utkirbek Haydarov; Uzbekistan | Homayoun Amiri; Iran |
| Light heavyweight 81 kg | Yerdos Zhanabergenov; Kazakhstan | Utkirbek Haydarov; Uzbekistan | Konstantin Makrausov; Tajikistan |
| Heavyweight; 91 kg | Shaukat Ali; Pakistan | Jasur Matchanov; Uzbekistan | Jung Eu-chen; South Korea |
| Heavyweight; 91 kg | Shaukat Ali; Pakistan | Jasur Matchanov; Uzbekistan | Zhenis Taumurynov; Kazakhstan |
| Super heavyweight +91 kg | Rouhollah Hosseini; Iran | Rustam Saidov; Uzbekistan | Rustam Rygebayev; Kazakhstan |
| Super heavyweight +91 kg | Rouhollah Hosseini; Iran | Rustam Saidov; Uzbekistan | Ahmad Wattar; Syria |

== Medal table ==
| Rank | Nation | Gold | Silver | Bronze | Total |
|---|---|---|---|---|---|
| 1 | Pakistan | 3 | 1 | 0 | 4 |
| 2 | Kazakhstan | 2 | 1 | 3 | 6 |
| 3 | Philippines | 2 | 0 | 1 | 3 |
| 4 | South Korea | 1 | 2 | 2 | 5 |
| 5 | Iran | 1 | 1 | 2 | 4 |
| 6 | Tajikistan | 1 | 0 | 2 | 3 |
| 6 | Thailand | 1 | 0 | 2 | 3 |
| 8 | Uzbekistan | 0 | 3 | 1 | 4 |
| 9 | Mongolia | 0 | 1 | 3 | 4 |
| 10 | North Korea | 0 | 1 | 0 | 1 |
| 10 | Turkmenistan | 0 | 1 | 0 | 1 |
| 12 | Vietnam | 0 | 0 | 2 | 2 |
| 13 | India | 0 | 0 | 1 | 1 |
| 13 | Indonesia | 0 | 0 | 1 | 1 |
| 13 | Japan | 0 | 0 | 1 | 1 |
| 13 | Syria | 0 | 0 | 1 | 1 |
| Totals (16 entries) | | 11 | 11 | 22 | 44 |
