= Spas Genov =

Bulgarian boxer

Medal record

Men's boxing

Representing Bulgaria

European Amateur Championships
Silver medal – second place	2006 Plovdiv	Welterweight

Spas Genov (Bulgarian: Спас Генов, born 24 May 1981) is a Bulgarian boxer best known to win Silver at welterweight at the Euro 2006.

He beat Kakhaber Zhvania but lost the final to Andrey Balanov.

== Professional career ==
He turned pro in 2008 and won twelve bouts.

== Professional boxing record ==
12 fights	12 wins	0 losses
By knockout	8	0
By decision	4	0
By disqualification	0	0
Draws	0	
No contests	0	

No.	Result	Record	Opponent	Type	Round, time	Date	Location	Notes
12	Win	12–0	Levan Shonia	UD	8	14 Dec 2019	Kolodruma, Plovdiv, Bulgaria	
11	Win	11–0	Cemal Gulsen	TKO	2 (6)	4 May 2019	Unihalle Wuppertal, Wuppertal, Germany	
10	Win	10–0	Levan Shonia	UD	6	27 Oct 2018	Arena Armeec, Sofia, Bulgaria	
9	Win	9–0	Mladen Ponjevic	KO	8	8 Jul 2017	Amphitheater, Gelsenkirchen, Germany	
8	Win	8–0	Viktor Polyakov	UD	8	11 Feb 2017	UFD Gym, Duesseldorf, Germany	
7	Win	7–0	Mile Nikolic	TKO	3 (6)	18 May 2012	National Winter Sports Palace, Sofia, Bulgaria	
6	Win	6–0	Serdar Uysal	UD	6	20 Apr 2012	Dortmund, Germany	
5	Win	5–0	Yavuz Keles	TKO	4 (6)	11 Fev 2012	Boxsporthalle Braamkamp, Winterhude, Germany	
4	Win	4–0	Patryk Kowoll	TKO	3 (4)	18 Nov 2011	Kugelbake Halle, Cuxhaven, Germany	
3	Win	3–0	Oleg Eirich	TKO	1 (4)	30 Oct 2011	Bürgerhaus Oststadt, Essen, Germany	
2	Win	2–0	Radoslav Gaidev	TKO	6 (8)	30 Jun 2008	Hristo Botev Sports Hall, Bulgaria	
1	Win	1–0	Merdjidin Yuseinov	TKO	3 (6)	17 May 2008	Universiada hall, Sofia, Bulgaria	
