= Bato-Munko Vankeev =

Belarusian boxer (born 1977)

Personal information
- Born: 4 February 1977 (age 49) Mogsokhon, Kizhinginsky District, Buryat ASSR, RSFSR, Soviet Union
Medal record
Men's Boxing
Representing Belarus
European Amateur Championships
Bronze medal – third place	2006 Plovdiv	Flyweight

Bato-Munko Demyanovich Vankeyev (Russian: Бато-Мунко Демьянович Ванкеев; born 4 February 1977) is a boxer from Belarus.

Vankeev qualified for the 2004 Summer Olympics by topping the 2nd AIBA European 2004 Olympic Qualifying Tournament in Warsaw, Poland. At the 2004 Summer Olympics he was stopped in the first round of the Flyweight (51 kg) division by Juan Carlos Payano of the Dominican Republic.

At the 2005 World Championships he edged out Enkhbatyn Badar-Uugan 29:27 in round 1 then lost to Tajikistani boxer Anvar Yunusov.

Two years later, Vankeev won a bronze medal in the same division at the 2006 European Amateur Boxing Championships in Plovdiv.
