= 2007 AIBA World Boxing Championships =

Boxing competitions

- Venue: UIC Pavilion
- Location: Chicago, United States
- Start date: October 23, 2007
- End date: November 3, 2007

The 2007 AIBA World Boxing Championships were held in Chicago, United States from October 23, 2007 to November 3, 2007. It was held at the UIC Pavilion. It was the biggest World Championships in AIBA history.

The competition is under the supervision of the world's governing body for amateur boxing AIBA.

== Medal table ==
Rank	Nation	Gold	Silver	Bronze	Total
1	Russia (RUS)	3	3	2	8
2	Italy (ITA)	2	1	1	4
3	United States (USA)	2	0	0	2
4	China (CHN)	1	0	4	5
5	England (ENG)	1	0	2	3
5	Kazakhstan (KAZ)	1	0	2	3
7	Uzbekistan (UZB)	1	0	0	1
8	Thailand (THA)	0	2	1	3
8	Ukraine (UKR)	0	2	1	3
10	Mongolia (MGL)	0	1	0	1
10	Philippines (PHI)	0	1	0	1
10	Venezuela (VEN)	0	1	0	1
13	France (FRA)	0	0	2	2
13	Turkey (TUR)	0	0	2	2
15	Azerbaijan (AZE)	0	0	1	1
15	Japan (JPN)	0	0	1	1
15	Lithuania (LTU)	0	0	1	1
15	North Korea (PRK)	0	0	1	1
15	Puerto Rico (PUR)	0	0	1	1
Totals (19 entries)		11	11	22	44

== Medal winners ==
Event	Gold	Silver	Bronze
Light flyweight (–48 kg)	Zou Shiming; China	Harry Tañamor; Philippines	Nordine Oubaali; France Amnat Ruanroeng; Thailand
Flyweight (–51 kg)	Rau'shee Warren; United States	Somjit Jongjohor; Thailand	Samir Mammadov; Azerbaijan Vincenzo Picardi; Italy
Bantamweight (–54 kg)	Sergey Vodopyanov; Russia	Enkhbatyn Badar-Uugan; Mongolia	McJoe Arroyo; Puerto Rico Joseph Murray; England
Featherweight (–57 kg)	Albert Selimov; Russia	Vasyl Lomachenko; Ukraine	Yakup Kılıç; Turkey Li Yang; China
Lightweight (–60 kg)	Frankie Gavin; England	Domenico Valentino; Italy	Alexey Tishchenko; Russia Kim Song-guk; North Korea
Light welterweight (–64 kg)	Serik Sapiyev; Kazakhstan	Gennady Kovalev; Russia	Masatsugu Kawachi; Japan Bradley Saunders; England
Welterweight (–69 kg)	Demetrius Andrade; United States	Non Boonjumnong; Thailand	Adem Kılıçcı; Turkey Hanati Silamu; China
Middleweight (–75 kg)	Matvey Korobov; Russia	Alfonso Blanco; Venezuela	Serhiy Derevyanchenko; Ukraine Bakhtiyar Artayev; Kazakhstan
Light heavyweight (–81 kg)	Abbos Atoev; Uzbekistan	Artur Beterbiev; Russia	Yerkebuian Shynaliyev; Kazakhstan Daugirdas Šemiotas; Lithuania
Heavyweight (–91 kg)	Clemente Russo; Italy	Rakhim Chakhkiev; Russia	Yushan Nijiati; China John M'Bumba; France
Super heavyweight (+91 kg)	Roberto Cammarelle; Italy	Vyacheslav Glazkov; Ukraine	Islam Timurziev; Russia Zhang Zhilei; China

== See also ==
- AIBA World Boxing Championships
