= Sergiy Derevyanchenko =

Ukrainian boxer (born 1985)

Personal information
- Nickname: The Technician
- Nationality: Ukrainian
- Born: 31 October 1985 (age 41) Feodosiya, Crimean Oblast, Ukrainian SSR, Soviet Union (now Feodosia, Ukraine)
- Height: 5 ft 9 in (175 cm)
- Weight: Middleweight

Boxing career
- Reach: 68 1/2 in (174 cm)

Boxing record
- Total fights: 22
- Wins: 16
- Win by KO: 11
- Losses: 7
Medal record
Men's amateur boxing
Representing Ukraine
World Championships
Bronze medal – third place	2007 Chicago	Middleweight
World University Championships
Gold medal – first place	2004 Antalya	Welterweight

Sergiy Vyacheslavovych Derevyanchenko (Ukrainian: Сергій В'ячеславович Дерев'янченко, Serhiy Derevianchenko pronounced [serˈɦij ʋjɐt͡ʃeˈsɫɑʋoʋɪt͡ʃ dereˈʋjɑnt͡ʃenkɔ]; born 31 October 1985) is a Ukrainian professional boxer who has challenged three times for world middleweight titles; the IBF title in 2018; the IBF and IBO titles in 2019; and the WBC title in 2020. As an amateur, he won the bronze medal at middleweight at the 2007 World Amateur Boxing Championships.

== Amateur career ==
His father was a boxer, who introduced him to the sport. Derevyanchenko trained with his father in his hometown, Feodosiya, until he was 10.

At the 2007 AIBA World Boxing Championships, he beat Argenis Casimiro Núñez in the quarter-finals to win a bronze medal, but was unable to progress any further, losing to Matvey Korobov in the semi-final. He participated in the 2008 Summer Olympics but lost to Emilio Correa in the second round. Derevyanchenko took part in the 2009 AIBA World Boxing Championships, where he reached the quarter-finals but fell short against Vijender Singh.

Between 2010 and 2014, he took part in the World Series of Boxing, where he became known as one of the best boxers in the competition. He became known for his excellent technique and his handspeed. He competed in 24 bouts, winning 23 of them. His sole loss in this competition came to Brian Castaño in the 2012–13 season quarter-final. Derevyanchenko was a champion twice, in the 2011–12 season with the Milano Thunder, and in the 2012–13 season with the Astana Arlans.

=== Results ===
==== AIBA World Boxing Championships ====
2007

- Defeated Victor Cotiujanschi (Moldova) 28-12
- Defeated Oliver Obradovic (Austria) RSCO 2
- Defeated Alexander Rubjuk (Estonia) 23-12
- Defeated Argenis Casimiro Núñez (Dominican Republic) RSCO 3
- Lost to Matvey Korobov (Russia) AB 2

2009

- Defeated Danijel Topalovic (Bosnia) RSC 3
- Defeated Alex Theran (Colombia) 13-8
- Defeated Adem Kılıççı (Turkey) 13-6
- Lost to Vijender Singh (India) 4-12

==== Olympic Games ====
2008 (as a middleweight)

- Defeated Wang Jianzheng (China) 15-6
- Lost to Emilio Correa (Cuba) 4-18

Derevyanchenko ended his amateur career with a record of 390–20.

== Professional career ==
=== Early career ===
Derevyanchenko turned professional in 2014, signing with promoter Lou DiBella and fighting out of New York City. After winning his first two fights, he signed a deal with manager Al Haymon. Derevyanchenko headlined his first televised card in August 2015, facing off against Elvin Ayala in an eight-round bout aired on ShoBox, winning by a wide unanimous decision, improving his record to 6–0. In August 2016, he faced former world champion Sam Soliman. In the first round, Derevyanchenko landed a left-right combination to the head, causing Soliman to take a knee. Soliman was dropped a further two times in the second-round, causing the referee to wave off the fight, giving Derevyanchenko the win by technical knockout (TKO).

=== Rise up the ranks ===
The IBF ordered an eliminator between Derevyanchenko and Tureano Johnson, with the winner becoming the mandatory challenger to the unified middleweight champion Gennady Golovkin. The fight was originally set for April 2016, but Johnson had to pull out due to injury. The fight was rescheduled for 25 August 2017, and was televised on Fox Sports 1. Derevyanchenko slowly broke down Johnson, hurting him repeatedly throughout the fight, finally dropping Johnson in the twelfth round, at which point the referee waved off the fight.

=== Derevyanchenko vs. Jacobs ===
27 October 2018, he fought Daniel Jacobs for the vacant IBF middleweight title at the Hulu Theater, New York. Losing by split decision, handing Derevyanchenko the first loss of his professional career.

=== Derevyanchenko vs. Culcay ===
He fought Jack Culcay on 13 April 2019 in a final eliminator for the IBF middleweight title. Winning by unanimous decision, Derevyanchenko became the mandatory challenger for unified middleweight champion Canelo Álvarez. However, after extended negotiations between Álvarez and Derevyanchenko, both parties failed to schedule a fight before the IBF's deadline, causing the IBF to strip Álvarez of their title. Álvarez's promoter, Oscar De La Hoya, expressed his displeasure with the decision to strip Álvarez of the belt, insisting Derevyanchenko had been offered an "unprecedented amount of money for a fighter of his limited stature and limited popularity".

=== Derevyanchenko vs. Golovkin ===
On 5 October 2019, he faced Gennady Golovkin for the vacant IBF and IBO middleweight titles at Madison Square Garden, New York City. After a tentative start to the opening round, which saw both fighters sizing each other up with probing jabs, Golovkin fired off a six punch combination ending with a right hook to Derevyanchenko's head, dropping the Ukrainian with 1 minute left in the first round. Derevyanchenko rose to his feet within seconds, showing no signs of being hurt. The knockdown appeared to spur Derevyanchenko into action as he began to answer Golovkin's punches with his own shots for the remainder of the round. In round two, Derevyanchenko began putting three and four punch combinations together behind a single and double jab, while Golovkin stuck to single punches, landing the occasional eye-catching hook. Towards the end of the round, Golovkin opened a cut above Derevyanchenko's right eye. The action replay appeared to show the cut was caused by a left hook, however, the New York State Athletic Commission deemed it to be the result of an accidental clash of heads, meaning if the fight was stopped due to the cut before the fourth round then the fight would be ruled a no contest, after the fourth, the result would be determined by the scorecards with a technical decision rather than a technical knockout win for Golovkin if the cut was deemed to be the result of a punch. After Golovkin started the opening seconds of the third round as the aggressor, Derevyanchenko quickly fired back to the body, appearing to hurt Golovkin as he backed up and kept his elbows tucked in close to his body to protect his mid-section. Derevyanchenko took advantage of Golovkin's defensive posture, landing several clean punches to the former champion's head. Towards the end of the round Golovkin had some success with a couple of sharp hooks to the head and a right uppercut. Golovkin was the aggressor for the majority of the fourth round, having partial success, with Derevyanchenko picking his moments to fire back with two and three punch combinations and continuing to work the body. In the last minute of the round, Derevyanchenko appeared to momentarily trouble Golovkin with a straight-left hand to the body. At the beginning of the fifth round, the ringside doctor gave the cut above Derevyanchenko's right-eye a close examination before the action resumed. Derevyanchenko controlled the pace of the round with a high punch-output, continuing with three and four punch combinations with lateral movement. Golovkin, meanwhile, stuck with single hooks and probing jabs, landing a solid uppercut halfway through the round. In the final 20 seconds, Derevyanchenko landed another body shot which again appeared to hurt Golovkin, who reeled backwards with his elbows down at his side, protecting his body. The sixth was an evenly fought round with both fighters landing several clean punches to the head, although Golovkin appeared to land the more significant blows which caught the attention of the crowd. Rounds seven, eight and nine saw much of the same, back and forth engagements with Golovkin seeming to land the more eye catching blows. The tenth saw Derevyanchenko apply the pressure and back Golovkin up for the first half of the round. Golovkin had success in the last minute with left and right hooks landing on Derevyanchenko's head, only to see the Ukrainian answer with his own solid shots and back Golovkin up once again in the final 30 seconds of the round. The eleventh and twelfth were closely contested, both fighters having success, with Golovkin again appearing to land the more catching punches in the twelfth and final round. After 12 hard fought rounds, Golovkin won by unanimous decision with two judges scoring the bout 115–112 and the third scoring it 114–113, all in favour of Golovkin. According to CompuBox stats, Golovkin landed a total of 243 (33.7%) punches out of 720, with 136 (43.3%) of 314 power punches, while Derevyanchenko landed a total of 230 (31.2%) punches out of 738, with 138 (29.3%) out of 472 power punches—the most an opponent has landed on Golovkin to date. In a post fight interview, promoter Eddie Hearn, who lead the promotion of DAZN in the US, stated: "...he won't say it, but Gennady has been ill, basically all week", alluding to the reason Golovkin did not appear on top form during the fight.

=== Derevyanchenko vs. Charlo ===
On 26 September 2020, he fought Jermall Charlo for the WBC middleweight title at the Mohegan Sun Arena, Uncasville. Derevyanchenko fought a tough fight, but Charlo's powerful jab and good game plan were too much for the Ukrainian. Charlo connected on more punches than Derevyanchenko, and ultimately deserved the unanimous decision win, with the scorecards reading 118–110, 117-111 and 116–112 in favor of Charlo.

=== Derevyanchenko vs. M'billi ===
Derevyanchenko was scheduled to face Christian M'billi at Videotron Centre in Quebec City, Canada on August 17, 2024. Derevyanchenko lost by unanimous decision. During the bout, Derevyanchenko suffered a torn left bicep in the fourth round, rendering him to only one fully functioning boxing arm.

== Professional boxing record ==
24 fights	17 wins	7 losses
By knockout	11	0
By decision	6	7

No.	Result	Record	Opponent	Type	Round, time	Date	Location	Notes
23	Loss	16–7	Jalil Hackett	UD	10	26 Jul 2026	Infosys Theater at Madison Square Garden, New York City, New York, U.S.	
22	Win	16–6	Jeremy Ramos	KO	6 (8), 2:35	1 Jul 2025	Texas Troubadour Theatre, Nashville, Tennessee, U.S.	
21	Loss	15–6	Christian M'billi	UD	10	17 Aug 2024	Videotron Centre, Quebec City, Canada	For WBC Continental Americas and WBA International title super middleweight titles
20	Win	15–5	Vaughn Alexander	UD	10	20 Apr 2024	Barclays Center, Brooklyn, New York, U.S.	
19	Loss	14–5	Jaime Munguía	UD	12	10 Jun 2023	Toyota Arena, Ontario, California, U.S.	For vacant WBC Silver super middleweight title
18	Win	14–4	Joshua Conley	UD	10	30 Jul 2022	Barclays Center, Brooklyn, New York, U.S.	
17	Loss	13–4	Carlos Adames	MD	10	5 Dec 2021	Staples Center, Los Angeles, California, U.S.	
16	Loss	13–3	Jermall Charlo	UD	12	26 Sep 2020	Mohegan Sun Arena, Montville, Connecticut, U.S.	For WBC middleweight title
15	Loss	13–2	Gennady Golovkin	UD	12	5 Oct 2019	Madison Square Garden, New York City, New York, U.S.	For vacant IBF and IBO middleweight titles
14	Win	13–1	Jack Culcay	UD	12	13 Apr 2019	Minneapolis Armory, Minneapolis, Minnesota, U.S.	
13	Loss	12–1	Daniel Jacobs	SD	12	27 Oct 2018	Hulu Theater, New York City, New York, U.S.	For vacant IBF middleweight title
12	Win	12–0	Dashon Johnson	RTD	6 (8), 3:00	3 Mar 2018	Barclays Center, New York City, New York, U.S.	
11	Win	11–0	Tureano Johnson	TKO	12 (12), 0:40	25 Aug 2017	Buffalo Run Casino, Miami, Oklahoma, U.S.	
10	Win	10–0	Kemahl Russell	TKO	5 (10), 1:06	14 Mar 2017	Fitz Tunica Casino and Hotel, Tunica, Mississippi, U.S.	
9	Win	9–0	Sam Soliman	TKO	2 (12), 2:41	21 Jul 2016	Foxwoods Resort, Ledyard, Connecticut, U.S.	
8	Win	8–0	Mike Guy	TKO	8 (8), 2:24	15 Mar 2016	Robinson Rancheria Resort and Casino, Nice, California, U.S.	
7	Win	7–0	Jessie Nicklow	TKO	3 (8), 2:18	14 Nov 2015	Hard Rock Hotel and Casino, Las Vegas, Nevada, U.S.	
6	Win	6–0	Elvin Ayala	UD	8	7 Aug 2015	Bally's Atlantic City, Atlantic City, New Jersey, U.S.	
5	Win	5–0	Alan Campa	TKO	4 (8), 1:17	10 Apr 2015	Aviator Sports Complex, New York City, New York, U.S.	
4	Win	4–0	Vladine Biosse	TKO	2 (8), 1:42	20 Feb 2015	Hilton Westchester, Rye Brook, New York, U.S.	
3	Win	3–0	Raul Munoz	KO	1 (6), 2:50	12 Dec 2014	UIC Pavilion, Chicago, Illinois, U.S.	
2	Win	2–0	Laatekwei Hammond	UD	4	1 Oct 2014	Barker Hangar, Santa Monica, California, U.S.	
1	Win	1–0	Cromwell Gordon	RTD	2 (6), 3:00	23 Jul 2014	BB King Blues Club & Grill, New York City, New York, U.S.	
