= Yerdos Zhanabergenov =

Kazakhstani boxer

Medal record

Representing Kazakhstan

World Amateur Championships
Gold medal – first place	2005 Mianyang	Light Heavyweight

Yerdos Zhanabergenov (Kazakh: Ердос Жаңабергенов) is an amateur boxer from Kazakhstan, best known for winning the light heavyweight title at the 2005 World Amateur Boxing Championships.

== Career ==
In 2005, he won a gold medal at the Asian Amateur Boxing Championships, and then went on to the 2005 World Amateur Boxing Championships, where he defeated Mourad Sahraoui, Uzbek Olympic bronze medalist Utkirbek Haydarov in the semifinal and Marijo Šivolija in the final.

He didn't compete in major international events after 2006.
