= Juan Carlos Payano =

Dominican boxer (born 1984)

Personal information
- Nickname: Baby Pacquiao
- Born: April 12, 1984 (age 42) La Vega, Dominican Republic
- Height: 5 ft 5 in (165 cm)
- Weight: Bantamweight

Boxing career
- Reach: 64 1/2 in (164 cm)
- Stance: Southpaw

Boxing record
- Total fights: 28
- Wins: 23
- Win by KO: 11
- Losses: 5
Medal record
Men's Amateur boxing
Representing Dominican Republic
Central American and Caribbean Games
Gold medal – first place	2006 Cartagena	Flyweight
Pan American Games
Silver medal – second place	2003 Santo Domingo	Flyweight
Silver medal – second place	2007 Rio	Flyweight

Juan Carlos Payano (born April 12, 1984) is a Dominican professional boxer who held the WBA (Undisputed) and then concurrently the IBO bantamweight titles between 2014 and 2016. As an amateur he won two silver medals at the Pan American Games and a gold medal at the Central American and Caribbean Games.

== Amateur career ==
At the 2003 Pan American Games in Santo Domingo, he lost to Cuba's Yuriorkis Gamboa in the Flyweight final, winning the silver medal.

He won the gold medal at the 2006 Cartagena games after defeating Cuban Yoandris Salinas.

At the 2007 Pan American Games, he won silver again after losing to Puerto Rico's McWilliams Arroyo in the final.

He compiled a record of 421 wins and 25 losses.

=== Olympic Games results ===
2004

- Defeated (Belarus) Bato-Munko Vankeev 26–18
- Lost to (France) Jérôme Thomas 10–15

2008

- Defeated (France) Jérôme Thomas 10–6
- Lost to (Italy) Vincenzo Picardi 4–8

== Professional career ==
=== Payano vs. Inoue ===
On October 7, 2018, Payano battled Naoya Inoue for the WBA bantamweight title, as a part of the World Boxing Super Series quarter-final. Inoue caught Payano with a left jab, right hook combination just 1 minute and 10 seconds into the fight, sending Payano to the canvas for the KO win. This was Payano's first professional career knockout loss.

=== Payano vs. Vazquez ===
In his next fight, Payano bounced back with a unanimous decision win against Damien Vazquez. Payano was in control for most of the fight, winning almost every round on the judges' scorecards, 79–73, 80–71, 80–71.

=== Payano vs. Nery ===
In his following fight, Payano battled against Luis Nery. Payano was considered the underdog against the undefeated Mexican. Nery had his own way for most of the fight, landing the cleaner shots throughout the fight. In the ninth round, a perfectly placed left hook to the body by Nery send Payano to the canvas. Writhing in pain, Payano was not even able to attempt to beat the count, leading to a ninth-round KO win for Nery.

=== Payano vs. Roman ===
On September 26, 2020, Payano fought former champion Daniel Roman, who was ranked #3 by the Ring, WBA and WBC, and #4 by the WBO and #6 at super bantamweight at the time. Payano lost the fight via unanimous decision. Despite boxing off his back foot, Payano had a strong start in the fight. However, Roman turned up the pressure in the championship rounds, and was aggressive enough to secure the win.

== Professional boxing record ==
28 fights	23 wins	5 losses
By knockout	11	2
By decision	12	3

No.	Result	Record	Opponent	Type	Round, time	Date	Location	Notes
28	Win	23–5	Raymond Tabugon	RTD	5 (8), 3:00	Aug 14, 2021	Dignity Health Sports Park, Carson, California, U.S.	
27	Win	22–5	Luis de la Rosa	RTD	5 (10)	Jul 10, 2021	Hotel Elsa, Santiago de Tolu, Colombia	
26	Loss	21–5	Gary Antonio Russell	TD	7 (10), 0:01	Dec 19, 2020	Mohegan Sun Arena, Montville, Connecticut, U.S.	Unanimous TD after Payano cut from accidental head clash
25	Loss	21–4	Daniel Roman	UD	12	Sep 26, 2020	Mohegan Sun Arena, Montville, Connecticut, U.S.	
24	Loss	21–3	Luis Nery	KO	9 (12), 1:43	Jul 20, 2019	MGM Grand Garden Arena, Paradise, Nevada, U.S.	For WBC Silver bantamweight title
23	Win	21–2	Damien Vazquez	UD	8	Mar 9, 2019	Dignity Health Sports Park, Carson, California, U.S.	
22	Loss	20–2	Naoya Inoue	KO	1 (12), 1:10	Oct 7, 2018	Yokohama Arena, Yokohama, Japan	For WBA (Regular) bantamweight title; World Boxing Super Series: bantamweight quarter-final
21	Win	20–1	Mike Plania	UD	10	Mar 23, 2018	Seminole Hard Rock Hotel and Casino, Hollywood, Florida, U.S.	Won vacant WBO Inter-Continental bantamweight title
20	Win	19–1	Alexis Santiago	UD	10	Aug 22, 2017	Sam's Town Hotel, Sunrise Manor, Nevada, U.S.	
19	Win	18–1	Isao Gonzalo Carranza	TKO	7 (8), 1:16	Jan 13, 2017	Park Race Track, Hialeah, Florida, U.S.	
18	Loss	17–1	Rau'shee Warren	MD	12	Jun 18, 2016	UIC Pavilion, Chicago, Illinois, U.S.	Lost WBA and IBO bantamweight titles
17	Win	17–0	Rau'shee Warren	SD	12	Aug 2, 2015	Full Sail University, Winter Park, Florida, U.S.	Retained WBA bantamweight title; Won vacant IBO bantamweight title
16	Win	16–0	Anselmo Moreno	TD	6 (12)	Sep 26, 2014	Mesquite Arena, Mesquite, Texas, U.S.	Won WBA bantamweight title; Unanimous TD after Payano cut from accidental head clash
15	Win	15–0	Germán Meraz	UD	8	Feb 22, 2014	Sands Casino Resort, Bethlehem, Pennsylvania, U.S.	
14	Win	14–0	Jundy Maraon	KO	7 (10), 0:39	Jun 14, 2013	South Mountain Arena, West Orange, New Jersey, U.S.	
13	Win	13–0	Jhon Alberto Molina	TKO	2 (10), 2:35	May 10, 2013	Coliseo Carlos 'Teo' Cruz, Santo Domingo, Dominican Republic	
12	Win	12–0	Jose Luis Araiza	UD	10	Nov 30, 2012	BB&T Center, Sunrise, Florida, U.S.	Retained WBA Fedelatin bantamweight title
11	Win	11–0	Jhon Alberto Molina	TKO	9 (10), 2:02	Jul 21, 2012	Seminole Hard Rock Hotel and Casino, Hollywood, Florida, U.S.	Won vacant NABA bantamweight title
10	Win	10–0	Luis Maldonado	UD	10	May 18, 2012	Seminole Hard Rock Hotel & Casino, Hollywood, Florida, U.S.	Won vacant WBA Fedelatin bantamweight title
9	Win	9–0	Jose Silveria	UD	10	Mar 2, 2012	Westin Diplomat Resort, Hollywood, Florida, U.S.	Won vacant WBC Latino bantamweight title
8	Win	8–0	Leshaun Blair	TKO	1 (6), 2:35	Dec 3, 2011	Coliseum Complex, Greensboro, North Carolina, U.S.	
7	Win	7–0	Dinoel Reynoso	TKO	2 (6), 1:44	Sep 5, 2011	Coliseo Carlos 'Teo' Cruz, Santo Domingo, Dominican Republic	
6	Win	6–0	Luis Angel Paneto	UD	6	Apr 23, 2011	Dade County Fair & Exposition, Miami, Florida, U.S.	
5	Win	5–0	Cristobal Ramos	KO	2 (6), 1:42	Mar 4, 2011	Pharaoh's Casino, Managua, Nicaragua	
4	Win	4–0	Norberto Jimenez	TKO	2 (6)	Oct 9, 2010	La Vega, Dominican Republic	
3	Win	3–0	Luis Hinojosa	UD	4	Sep 18, 2010	Coliseo Carlos 'Teo' Cruz, Santo Domingo, Dominican Republic	
2	Win	2–0	Daniel Veras	TKO	3 (4)	Aug 28, 2010	Parque Publico, Elias Pina, Dominican Republic	
1	Win	1–0	Aneudy Mesa	UD	4	Aug 21, 2010	Polideportivo Fabio Gonzalez, Puerto Plata, Dominican Republic	

== See also ==
- List of southpaw stance boxers
- List of world bantamweight boxing champions

Sporting positions
Regional boxing titles
Vacant Title last held by Óscar Escandón	WBC Latino bantamweight champion March 2, 2012 – June 2012; Vacated	Vacant Title next held by Ivan Ruiz Peranton
Vacant Title last held by Yonfrez Parejo	WBA Fedelatin bantamweight champion May 18, 2012 – February 2013; Vacated	Vacant Title next held by Jonathan Guzmán
Vacant Title last held by Jose Silveria	NABA bantamweight champion July 21, 2012 – August 2013; Vacated	Vacant Title next held by Stephon Young
Vacant Title last held by Siboniso Gonya	WBO Inter-Continental bantamweight champion March 23, 2018 – 2018; Vacated	Vacant Title next held by Jonas Sultan
Minor world boxing titles
Vacant Title last held by Joseph Agbeko	IBO bantamweight champion August 2, 2015 – June 18, 2016	Succeeded by Rau'shee Warren
Major world boxing titles
Preceded by Anselmo Moreno	WBA bantamweight champion Undisputed title September 26, 2014 – June 18, 2016	Succeeded by Rau'shee Warren
