= Samir Mammadov =

Azerbaijani boxer (born 1988)

Personal information
- Born: May 15, 1988 (age 38) Baku, Azerbaijan SSR
- Height: 1.62 m (5 ft 4 in)

Sport
- Country: Azerbaijan
- Sport: Boxing
- Event: Flyweight
Medal record
World Amateur Championships
Bronze medal – third place	2007 Chicago	Flyweight
European Amateur Championships
Silver medal – second place	2006 Plovdiv	Flyweight

Samir Mammadov (Azerbaijani: Samir Məmmədov; born May 15, 1988) is a boxer from Azerbaijan, who won the silver medal in the men's flyweight division (– 51 kg) at the 2006 European Championships in Bulgaria and bronze at the 2007 World Championships.

== Career ==
At the Euros 2006 he beat Vincenzo Picardi and Jérôme Thomas but lost to Georgi Balakshin.

At the Junior World Championships 2006 he competed as a bantamweight but lost to Uzbek Orzubek Shayimov.

At the 2007 World Amateur Boxing Championships he dropped to flyweight and beat the Puerto Rican PanAmerican Games Gold medalist McWilliams Arroyo to reach the semifinals, where he was defeated by Rau'shee Warren.
