= Jundy Maraon =

Filipino boxer (born 1985)

Personal information
- Nickname: Batang Gwaping ("Pretty Boy")
- Nationality: Filipino
- Born: Jundy Gonzaga Maraon; 25 February 1985 (age 41) Molave, Zamboanga del Sur, Philippines
- Height: 5 ft 6 in (168 cm)
- Weight: Bantamweight

Boxing career
- Stance: Southpaw

Boxing record
- Total fights: 17
- Wins: 15
- Win by KO: 11
- Losses: 1
- Draws: 1

Jundy Maraon (born 25 February 1985 in Molave, Zamboanga del Sur) is a Filipino professional boxer. Nicknamed as "Batang Gwaping" (Tagalog for "pretty boy"), Maraon was a former WBO Asia Pacific bantamweight champion.

== Boxing career ==
Maraon made his professional debut on 26 July 2003, defeating Rogelio Oro at Ipil, Zamboanga Sibugay, Philippines.
