= Rau'shee Warren =

American boxer (born 1987)

Personal information
- Nickname: Baby Pit
- Nationality: American
- Born: February 13, 1987 (age 39) Cincinnati, Ohio, U.S.
- Height: 5 ft 6 1/2 in (169 cm)
- Weight: Bantamweight

Boxing career
- Reach: 64 1/2 in (164 cm)
- Stance: Southpaw

Boxing record
- Total fights: 24
- Wins: 19
- Win by KO: 5
- Losses: 4
- No contests: 1
Medal record
Men's amateur boxing
Representing United States
World Championships
Gold medal – first place	2007 Chicago	Flyweight
Bronze medal – third place	2005 Mianyang	Flyweight
Bronze medal – third place	2011 Baku	Flyweight

Rau'shee Warren (/ˈraʊʃiː/; born February 13, 1987) is an American professional boxer who held the WBA (Undisputed), and IBO bantamweight titles from 2016 to 2017. As an amateur he won a gold medal at the 2007 World Championships, as well as bronze at the 2005 and 2011 World Championships, all in the flyweight division.

== Amateur career ==
At the 1st AIBA American 2004 Olympic Qualifying Tournament in 2004, at the age of 17, he upset Rayonta Whitfield, Diego Hurtado, and international competitors Raúl Castañeda (Mexico) and Miguel Miranda (Venezuela) to qualify as the U.S. boxing team's 106-pound light flyweight representative at the 2004 Athens Olympics. He was both the youngest boxer in the games and the youngest US male in all sports. He was eliminated by the favored Zou Shiming of China in the first round.

He moved up to flyweight soon after and in 2005 and 2006 became US champion. At the 2005 World Amateur Boxing Championships in Mianyang, he avenged a previous loss to European champion Georgy Balakshin before losing to the Korean surprise winner Lee Ok-Sung and having to settle for bronze.

In 2006, light middleweight Akima Stocks and Warren were named USA Boxing's 2006 Athletes of the Year. That year, he also moved up to fight as a bantamweight and lost to highly regarded Cuban Guillermo Rigondeaux in November.

In 2007, he returned to the flyweight ranks and repeated as US champion.

At the 2007 World Amateur Boxing Championships in Chicago, he defeated European Champion Georgy Balakshin in a rematch and Samir Mammadov to reach the finals. In the finals, he defeated Thai Somjit Jongjohor.

In 2008, he became the first American boxer in more than 30 years to compete at two Olympic Games, accomplishing something not done since Davey Lee Armstrong in 1972 and 1976.

At the 2008 Beijing Olympics, Warren lost in the first round, again to Lee Ok-Sung, in a controversial decision given that he assumed that he had won on points.

He remained in the amateur ranks and ascended to the bantamweight division again at the US Nationals 2009 where he controversially lost his semifinal 19:19 (countback loss) to eventual champion Jesus Magdaleno.

While competing for the Los Angeles Matadors in the World Series of Boxing, Warren secured a Bronze in the US nationals in 2009 and gold in 2010. A gold medal in the 2011 individual competition (they also compete for team titles) at the WSB secured champions in 5 WSB weight classes the first Olympic slots, so participation in WSB saw Warren's first near miss at qualifying (only top 2 ranked boxers after team competition selected for individual title fight). Warren won the 2011 US Olympic Trials and came home with the Bronze after the 2011 World Championships, securing his place in a third Olympics, unprecedented for an American boxer, at only 25 years old.

On August 3, 2012 at the London Olympics, Rau'shee Warren failed to get past the first round of the brackets yet again for the third time of his amateur career, losing to Nordine Oubaali of France in a close decision of 19-18.

=== World Series of Boxing record ===
7 Wins, 0 Losses
Result	Record	Team	Opponent (Team)	Score	Date	Location	Notes
Win	7–0	Los Angeles Matadors	(Thailand) Donchai Thathi (Bangkok Elephants)	2-1	2011-12-18	(United States) Los Angeles, U.S.	
Win	6–0	Los Angeles Matadors	(Kazakhstan) Khabibulla Ismail-Akhunov (Astana Arlans)	3-0	2011-11-13	(United States) Los Angeles, U.S.	
Win	5–0	Los Angeles Matadors	(Kazakhstan) Mirzhan Rakhimzhanov (Astana Arlans)	3-0	2011-04-09	Astana, Kazakhstan	Semi-finals first leg
Win	4–0	Los Angeles Matadors	Braulio Ávila (Mexico Guerreros)	3-0	2011-02-04	Mexico City, Mexico	
Win	3–0	Los Angeles Matadors	(Dominican Republic) Luis Miguel Diaz (Miami Gallos)	3-0	2011-01-30	(United States) Los Angeles, U.S.	
Win	2–0	Los Angeles Matadors	(Germany) Ronny Beblik (Memphis Force)	3-0	2010-12-16	(United States) Memphis, U.S.	
Win	1–0	Los Angeles Matadors	Elias Emigdio (Mexico Guerreros)	3-0	2010-11-28	(United States) Los Angeles, U.S.	

== Professional career ==
Warren made his long-awaited professional debut on November 9, 2012, winning a four-round unanimous decision over Luis Rivera.

Having won thirteen of his first fourteen fights (the only blemish being a three-round no contest against Javier Gallo on December 12, 2014), Warren attempted to win his first world championship—the WBA (Undisputed) and vacant IBO bantamweight titles—on August 2, 2015, but lost a debatable split decision to Juan Carlos Payano.

In a rematch with Payano on June 18, 2016, Warren gained revenge by winning both titles with a majority decision.

However, Warren lost in his first defense to Zhanat Zhakiyanov by split decision.

On 29 July 2017, Warren faced McJoye Arroyo in an IBF super flyweight eliminator. Warren outworked Arroyo in most of the rounds, often being the busier, sharper and tougher fighter. The scorecards read 118-110, 117-109 and 117-109 if favor of Warren.

In his next fight against Juan Gabriel Medina, Warren had another dominant performance and defeated his opponent via unanimous decision, winning every single round on all of the scorecards.

On September 5, 2018, it was announced that Warren would face former Olympics opponent Nordine Oubaali for the WBC bantamweight title, previously vacated by Luis Nery. Both fighters fought well, but it was Oubaali who was the bigger puncher and landed more eye-catching shots. In addition to that, Oubaali was simply busier and sharper than Warren, which ultimately made the difference. The scorecards read 117-111, 116-112 and 115-113 in favor of Oubaali.

On 15 February, Warren faced Gilberto Mendoza. Warren outclassed Mendoza and won the fight comfortably on all three scorecards, 100-90, 99-91 and 99-91.

== Professional boxing record ==
24 fights	19 wins	4 losses
By knockout	5	0
By decision	14	4
No contests	1	

No.	Result	Record	Opponent	Type	Round, time	Date	Location	Notes
24	Loss	19–4 (1)	Francisco Pedroza Portillo	UD	6	Aug 20, 2022	Seminole Hard Rock Hotel and Casino, Hollywood, Florida, US	
23	Win	19–3 (1)	Damien Vázquez	KO	2 (10), 2:55	Aug 14, 2021	Dignity Health Sports Park, Carson, California, US	
22	Win	18–3 (1)	Sharone Carter	UD	10	Feb 20, 2021	Mohegan Sun Arena, Montville, Connecticut, U.S.	
21	Win	17–3 (1)	Gilberto Mendoza	UD	10	Feb 15, 2020	Bridgestone Arena, Nashville, Tennessee, U.S.	
20	Loss	16–3 (1)	Nordine Oubaali	UD	12	Jan 19, 2019	MGM Grand Garden Arena, Paradise, Nevada, U.S.	For vacant WBC bantamweight title
19	Win	16–2 (1)	Juan Gabriel Medina	UD	8	Apr 21, 2018	Barclays Center, New York City, New York, U.S.	
18	Win	15–2 (1)	McJoe Arroyo	UD	12	Jul 29, 2017	Barclays Center, New York City, New York, U.S.	
17	Loss	14–2 (1)	Zhanat Zhakiyanov	SD	12	Feb 10, 2017	Huntington Center, Toledo, Ohio, U.S.	Lost WBA (Undisputed) and IBO bantamweight titles
16	Win	14–1 (1)	Juan Carlos Payano	MD	12	Jun 18, 2016	UIC Pavilion, Chicago, Illinois, U.S.	Won WBA (Undisputed) and IBO bantamweight titles
15	Loss	13–1 (1)	Juan Carlos Payano	SD	12	Aug 2, 2015	Full Sail University, Winter Park, Florida, U.S.	For WBA (Undisputed) and vacant IBO bantamweight titles
14	Win	13–0 (1)	Javier Gallo	TKO	1 (10), 0:52	Mar 6, 2015	MGM Grand Marquee Ballroom, Paradise, Nevada, U.S.	
13	NC	12–0 (1)	Javier Gallo	NC	1 (10), 1:08	Dec 12, 2014	UIC Pavilion, Chicago, Illinois, U.S.	Gallo cut from accidental head clash
12	Win	12–0	Jose Luis Araiza	UD	10	Sep 6, 2014	U.S. Bank Arena, Cincinnati, Ohio, U.S.	
11	Win	11–0	Ricardo Alvarado	UD	10	May 2, 2014	Hard Rock Hotel & Casino, Paradise, Nevada, U.S.	
10	Win	10–0	German Meraz	UD	8	Jan 25, 2014	D.C. Armory, Washington, D.C., U.S.	
9	Win	9–0	Jose Silveira	UD	8	Dec 14, 2013	Alamodome, San Antonio, Texas, U.S.	
8	Win	8–0	Jhon Alberto Molina	UD	4	Oct 14, 2013	BB&T Center, Sunrise, Florida, U.S.	
7	Win	7–0	Omar Gonzalez	UD	6	Sep 2, 2013	Cowboys Dancehall, San Antonio, Texas, U.S.	
6	Win	6–0	Jesus Bayron	UD	6	Jul 5, 2013	Cumberland County Crown Coliseum, Fayetteville, North Carolina, U.S.	
5	Win	5–0	Jiovanne Fuentes	TKO	2 (4), 1:04	Jun 22, 2013	Barclays Center, New York City, New York, U.S.	
4	Win	4–0	Angel Carvajal	TKO	4 (4), 2:05	May 18, 2013	Boardwalk Hall, Atlantic City, New Jersey, U.S.	
3	Win	3–0	Richard Hernandez	TKO	2 (4), 2:04	Feb 16, 2013	Boardwalk Hall, Atlantic City, New Jersey, U.S.	
2	Win	2–0	David Reyes	UD	4	Dec 8, 2012	Business Expo Center, Anaheim, California, U.S.	
1	Win	1–0	Luis Rivera	UD	4	Nov 9, 2012	Fantasy Springs Resort Casino, Indio, California, U.S.	

Sporting positions
Amateur boxing titles
Previous: Ronald Siler	U.S. flyweight champion 2005–2007	Next: Randy Caballero
Previous: Louie Byrd	U.S. Golden Gloves flyweight champion 2010	Next: Louie Byrd
Previous: Jessie Magdaleno	U.S. bantamweight champion 2010	Next: John Franklin
Minor world boxing titles
Preceded by Juan Carlos Payano	IBO bantamweight champion June 18, 2016 – February 10, 2017; Vacant after loss to Zhakiyanov	Vacant Title next held by Michael Dasmariñas
Major world boxing titles
Preceded by Juan Carlos Payano	WBA bantamweight champion Undisputed title June 18, 2016 – February 10, 2017	Succeeded by Zhanat Zhakiyanov
