= Mogsokhon =

Mogsokhon Могсохон
- Selo
- Location within Republic of Buryatia Location within Russia
- Coordinates: 51°53′N 110°19′E
- Country: Russia
- Region: Republic of Buryatia
- District: Kizhinginsky District
- Time zone: UTC+8:00

Mogsokhon (Russian: Могсохон) is a rural locality (a selo) in Kizhinginsky District, Republic of Buryatia, Russia. The population was 1,120 as of 2010. There are 15 streets.

== Geography ==
Mogsokhon is located 39 km east of Kizhinga (the district's administrative centre) by road. Mikhaylovka is the nearest rural locality.
