= Mark Davis (boxer) =

American boxer, born 1987

Personal information
- Nickname: Too Sharp
- Nationality: (United States) American
- Born: Mark Davis; January 15, 1987 (age 39) Columbus, Ohio, U.S.
- Height: 5 ft 6 in (168 cm)
- Weight: Lightweight

Boxing career
- Stance: Orthodox

Boxing record
- Total fights: 21
- Wins: 19
- Win by KO: 5
- Losses: 2

Mark Davis (born January 15, 1987) is an American professional Olympian boxer, formerly an amateur boxer in the lightweight division.

== Amateur career ==
Had a reported 200 amateur bout record.

Competed at the US Olympic Trials for the 2004 Olympics at 112 lbs beating Charles Huerta but losing to Ron Siler and then on a walkover to Aaron Alafa. Gold medalist at the 2005 US National championships at 57 kg beating Richard Baltazar and Ray Robinson and others. Won two contests for USA at 2005 World Cup at 57 kg. Competed at the 2005 World championships at 57 kg.

Won two bouts when representing United States vs. Belarus in 2006 at 57 kg. Won gold medal at the 2006 US championships at 57 kg. Won Eastern Olympic trials for 2008 Olympics at 57 kg.

== Professional career ==
In 2011, Davis scored a TKO victory over the Dominican Republic’s Ramesis Gil when Gil was unable to answer the bell for round six. Davis defeated Guillermo Sanchez of Buffalo via unanimous decision in Cleveland.

On July 2, 2014 Mark Davis underestimated his opponent, Michael Farenas of the Philippines (39-4-4 with 32 knockouts), and got stopped via TKO in round 8. Bringing an end to his undefeated record.

== Professional boxing record ==
16 Wins (5 knockouts, 0 decisions), 0 Losses, 0 Draws, 0 No Contests
Result	Record	Opponent	Type	Round	Date	Location	Notes
Win	16–0	(Puerto Rico) Guillermo Sanchez	UD	10	2011-11-12	La Villa Banquet Center in Cleveland, Ohio	
Win	15–0	(Dominican Republic) Ramesis Gil	RTD	5 (6), 3:00	2011-04-02	(New York (state)) Aviator Sports Complex in Brooklyn, New York	
Win	14–0	(United States) Justo Vallecillo	UD	4	2010-08-21	Fairmont Hotel, Dallas, Texas	
Win	13–0	(United States) Wayne Fletcher	UD	4	2010-07-17	Harbor Amphitheater in Rockwall, Texas	
Win	12–0	(United States) Steve Gonzalez	UD	8	2009-04-03	Pepsi Pavilion, in Memphis, Tennessee	
Win	11–0	(Mexico) Adauto Gonzalez	UD	8	2009-03-14	Fitzgerald's Casino & Hotel in Tunica, Mississippi	
Win	10–0	(Dominican Republic) Roberto Astacio	UD	8	2008-11-22	Fitzgerald's Casino & Hotel in Tunica, Mississippi	
Win	9–0	(United States) Carl McNickles	TKO	4 (6), 2:51	2008-09-27	Fitzgerald's Casino & Hotel in Tunica, Mississippi	
Win	8–0	(United States) Derrick Moon	UD	6	2008-05-24	Fitzgerald's Casino & Hotel in Tunica, Mississippi	
Win	7–0	(Cuba) Jorge Ruiz	UD	6	2008-04-26	Fitzgerald's Casino & Hotel in Tunica, Mississippi	
Win	6–0	(Puerto Rico) Sadot Vazquez	UD	6	2008-04-09	(Georgia (country)) Bell Auditorium, Augusta, Georgia	
Win	5–0	(United States) Ricky Alexander	KO	2 (4), 2:59	2008-03-01	Fitzgerald's Casino & Hotel in Tunica, Mississippi	
Win	4–0	(United States) Lee Griffith	KO	1 (4), 1:59	2008-01-26	Fitzgerald's Casino & Hotel in Tunica, Mississippi	
Win	3–0	(Puerto Rico) Alberto Amaro	UD	4	2007-10-20	Fitzgerald's Casino & Hotel in Tunica, Mississippi	
Win	2–0	(United States) Samuel Johnston	KO	1 (4), ?	2007-09-07	Hard Rock Casino in Biloxi, Mississippi	
Win	1–0	(United States) Guillerno Alonso	UD	4	2007-09-01	Fitzgerald's Casino & Hotel in Tunica, Mississippi	Davis' professional debut.
