= 2006 Boxing World Cup =

Boxing competitions

The 2006 Boxing World Cup was held in Baku, Azerbaijan from October 15 to October 22.

== Preliminaries ==
=== Pool A ===
- Azerbaijan
- Cuba
- Kazakhstan
- United States

October 15, 2006	Cuba	Kazakhstan	9–2
October 16, 2006	Azerbaijan	USA	9–2
October 17, 2006	Cuba	USA	11–0
October 17, 2006	Azerbaijan	Kazakhstan	9–2
October 19, 2006	Cuba	Azerbaijan	11–0
October 21, 2006	Kazakhstan	USA	7–4	(USA - 4 walkovers)

Preliminary round standings

	W	L
Cuba	3	0
Azerbaijan	2	1
Kazakhstan	1	2
USA	0	3

=== Pool B ===
- Africa
- China
- Russia
- Ukraine

October 15, 2006	Russia	China	9–2
October 16, 2006	Ukraine	Africa	10–1
October 18, 2006	Russia	Ukraine	10–1	(Ukraine - 3 walkovers)
October 18, 2006	China	Africa	9–2
October 19, 2006	Russia	Africa	9–2	(1 draw in favour of Russia - number of punches thrown)
October 21, 2006	Ukraine	China	10–1

Preliminary round standings

	W	L
Russia	3	0
Ukraine	2	1
China	1	2
Africa	0	3

== Final ==
October 22, 2006	Cuba	Russia	6–5

- Ukraine and Azerbaijan shared the third place.
