= Mirzhan Rakhimzhanov =

Kazakhstani boxer (born 1983)

Personal information
- Full name: Миржан Бейбутович Рахимжанов
- Nationality: Kazakhstan
- Born: April 11, 1983 (age 43) Shyrgys, Kazakh SSR, Soviet Union
- Height: 1.64 m (5 ft 4 1/2 in)
- Weight: 51 kg (112 lb)

Sport
- Sport: Boxing
- Weight class: Bantamweight
Medal record
Asian Championships
Bronze medal – third place	2005 Ho Chi Minh City	Bantamweight

Mirzhan Beybutovich Rakhimzhanov (Kazakh: Миржан Бейбутович Рахимжанов; born August 18, 1983, in East Kazakhstan Oblast (now East Kazakhstan Province)) is a boxer from Kazakhstan. He competed for his native country at the 2004 Summer Olympics in Athens, Greece, where he was stopped in the second round of the flyweight division (– 51 kg) by Russia's Georgy Balakshin.

Rakhimzhanov qualified for the Athens Games by topping the 2nd AIBA Asian 2004 Olympic Qualifying Tournament in Karachi, Pakistan. In the final he defeated Indonesia's Bonyx Yusak Saweho. He was a member of the Kazakhstan national team that competed at the 2005 Boxing World Cup in Moscow, Russia.
