= Kakhaber Zhvania =

Georgian boxer

Medal record

Representing Georgia

Men's Boxing

European Amateur Championships
Bronze medal – third place	2006 Plovdiv	Welterweight

Kakhaber Zhvania (Georgian: კახაბერ ჟვანია) is an amateur boxer from Georgia best known to qualify for the Olympics at welterweight.

At the Euro 2006 he won Bronze losing his semi to Spas Genov, at the 2007 World Championsahips he was defeated by eventual winner Demetrius Andrade.

At the first qualifier he was upset by Billy Joe Saunders but qualified at the second tournament.
