= Mirat Sarsembayev =

Kazakhstani boxer (born 1986)

Personal information
- Nationality: Kazakh
- Born: July 13, 1986 (age 39) Taldykorgan, Kazakh SSR, Soviet Union
- Height: 5 ft 4.5 in (164 cm)
- Weight: Super-bantamweight

Boxing career

Boxing record
- Total fights: 6
- Wins: 6
- Win by KO: 2
- Losses: 0
Medal record
Men's amateur boxing
Representing Kazakhstan
World Amateur Championships
Bronze medal – third place	2005 Mianyang	Flyweight
Asian Championships
Gold medal – first place	2007 Ulan Bator	Flyweight

Mirat Sarsembayev (born July 13, 1986) is a Kazakh former professional boxer who competed from 2009 to 2010. As an amateur, Sarsembayev won a bronze medal at the 2005 World Amateur Boxing Championships and represented Kazakhstan at the 2008 Olympics as a flyweight.

== Career ==
At the 2005 World Championships he beat Britain's Don Broadhurst and Tunisian Walid Cherif but lost the semifinal to Cuban southpaw Andry Laffita. He was a member of the Kazakhstan national team that competed at the 2005 Boxing World Cup in Moscow, Russia.

At the 2006 Asian Games he lost the quarterfinal to Somjit Jongjohor (11:20), and at the 2007 World Championships he lost to the same opponent (8:17).

At the 2008 Olympics he beat Rafał Kaczor of Poland (14:5) but lost to Russian Georgy Balakshin (4:12).

== Professional boxing record ==
6 fights	6 wins	0 losses
By knockout	2	0
By decision	4	0

No.	Result	Record	Opponent	Type	Round, time	Date	Location	Notes
6	Win	6–0	(Uzbekistan) Ihror Rihsiev	SD	6	1 May 2010	Altyn Saray, Shymkent, Kazakhstan	
5	Win	5–0	(Georgia (country)) Khvicha Papiashvili	UD	4	20 Feb 2010	Taraz, Kazakhstan	
4	Win	4–0	(Uzbekistan) Asror Sotvoldiev	TKO	4 (6), 1:55	24 Oct 2009	Circus, Almaty, Kazakhstan	
3	Win	3–0	(Kyrgyzstan) Mayrambek Akunov	TKO	2 (4), 2:36	29 Aug 2009	Ala-Too Resort, Cholpon-Ata, Kyrgyzstan	
2	Win	2–0	(Kyrgyzstan) Azizbek Kalmamatov	UD	4	27 Jun 2009	Ablay Khan Sports Club, Almaty, Kazakhstan	
1	Win	1–0	(Uzbekistan) Bakhit Abdurahimov	UD	4	30 May 2009	Circus, Almaty, Kazakhstan	
