= Rafał Kaczor =

Polish boxer

Personal information
- Nationality: Polish
- Born: August 6, 1982 (age 43) Legnica, Poland
- Weight: Flyweight

Boxing career
- Stance: Orthodox

Boxing record
- Total fights: 3
- Wins: 2
- Win by KO: 0
- Losses: 1
- Draws: 0
Medal record
Men's boxing
Representing Poland
EU Amateur Championships
Gold medal – first place	2008 Cetniewo	Light Flyweight

Rafal Kaczor (born 6 August 1982) is a Polish amateur boxer who represented his country at flyweight at the 2008 Olympic games. He lost his debut to Mirat Sarsembayev 5:14.
