= 2005 World Amateur Boxing Championships =

Boxing competitions

2005 AIBA World Boxing Championships
- Venue: Jiu Zhou Gymnasium
- Location: Mianyang, China
- Start date: November 13, 2005
- End date: November 20, 2005

The men's 2005 World Amateur Boxing Championships were held in Mianyang, China, from November 13 to November 20. The competition was organised by the world's governing body for amateur boxing AIBA.

== Medal winners ==
Event	Gold	Silver	Bronze
Light flyweight (–48 kilograms)	Zou Shiming; China	Bedak Pál; Hungary	Sherali Dostiev; Tajikistan Birzhan Zhakypov; Kazakhstan
Flyweight (–51 kilograms)	Lee Ok-Sung; South Korea	Andry Laffita; Cuba	Rau'shee Warren; United States Mirat Sarsembayev; Kazakhstan
Bantamweight (–54 kilograms)	Guillermo Rigondeaux; Cuba	Rustamhodza Rahimov; Germany	Ali Hallab; France Gary Russell, Jr. United States
Featherweight (–57 kilograms)	Alexey Tishchenko; Russia	Alexey Shaydulin; Bulgaria	Yuriorkis Gamboa; Cuba Viorel Simion; Romania
Lightweight (–60 kilograms)	Yordenis Ugás; Cuba	Romal Amanov; Azerbaijan	Khabib Allakhverdiyev; Russia Domenico Valentino; Italy
Light welterweight (–64 kilograms)	Serik Sapiyev; Kazakhstan	Dilshod Mahmudov; Uzbekistan	Inocente Fiss; Cuba Emil Maharramov; Azerbaijan
Welterweight (–69 kilograms)	Erislandy Lara; Cuba	Magomed Nurutdinov; Belarus	Bakhtiyar Artayev; Kazakhstan Neil Perkins; England
Middleweight (–75 kilograms)	Matvey Korobov; Russia	Ismail Sillakh; Ukraine	Emilio Correa; Cuba Mohammed Hikal; Egypt
Light heavyweight (–81 kilograms)	Yerdos Zhanabergenov; Kazakhstan	Marijo Šivolija; Croatia	Utkirbek Haydarov; Uzbekistan Artak Malumyan; Armenia
Heavyweight (–91 kilograms)	Aleksandr Alekseyev; Russia	Elchin Alizade; Azerbaijan	Jasur Mazhanov; Uzbekistan Alexander Povernov; Germany
Super heavyweight (+91 kilograms)	Odlanier Solís; Cuba	Roman Romanchuk; Russia	Roberto Cammarelle; Italy Kubrat Pulev; Bulgaria

== Medal table ==
Rank	Nation	Gold	Silver	Bronze	Total
1	Cuba (CUB)	4	1	3	8
2	Russia (RUS)	3	1	1	5
3	Kazakhstan (KAZ)	2	0	3	5
4	China (CHN)	1	0	0	1
4	South Korea (KOR)	1	0	0	1
6	Azerbaijan (AZE)	0	2	1	3
7	Uzbekistan (UZB)	0	1	2	3
8	Bulgaria (BUL)	0	1	1	2
8	Germany (GER)	0	1	1	2
10	Belarus (BLR)	0	1	0	1
10	Croatia (CRO)	0	1	0	1
10	Hungary (HUN)	0	1	0	1
10	Ukraine (UKR)	0	1	0	1
14	Italy (ITA)	0	0	2	2
14	United States (USA)	0	0	2	2
16	Armenia (ARM)	0	0	1	1
16	Egypt (EGY)	0	0	1	1
16	England (ENG)	0	0	1	1
16	France (FRA)	0	0	1	1
16	Romania (ROU)	0	0	1	1
16	Tajikistan (TJK)	0	0	1	1
Totals (21 entries)		11	11	22	44
