= AIBA Boxing World Cup =

Boxing competition

Boxing World Cup
- Status: inactive
- Genre: sports event
- Date: various
- Frequency: biannual
- Location: various
- Inaugurated: 1979
- Founder: Colonel Don Hull
- Most recent: 2008
- Attendance: .
- Major events: amateur boxing
- Organiser: AIBA
- People: Anwar Chowdhry

The Boxing World Cup was an international boxing event organized by the AIBA, featuring boxers competing in different weight divisions. It was held from 1979 to 1998 as an individual competition and from 2002 to 2006 as a team competition. In 2008, the format returned to individual competition, though the team score was still accounted for.

== History ==
Individual boxers were competing in their weight categories as part of the team competition, with the overall winner decided by the higher number of total wins. Each team represented countries and continents. The number of weight categories differed per Cup. Related type of competition could be considered boxing team duels, often held between countries as part of the final stage of preparation for the IBA World Boxing Championships.

The event took place twelve times, from 1979 to 2008. In 2005, the event took place in Moscow, Russia, and the Russian team won. In the next event was held in Baku, Azerbaijan, and the Cuban team won.

After a new president was elected in the International Boxing Association and the event stopped. It did not take place in 2007. In 2008, it was announced by the boxing organization that the event would continue on, but in a different competition, which will happen once in two years and the following one being in 2008. It would feature the top ranked boxers competing in this event in their weight categories. The place chosen for the event was Moscow.

== Competition format ==
Certain editions of the World Cup, held in the 1990s, saw individual matches of five two-minute rounds.

== Results by year ==
Edition	Year	Host	Venue	Dates	Winner	Runner-up	Final score	Third place	Notes	Refs
1	1979	New York City, United States	Madison Square Garden	October 11–19	United States	Soviet Union	7–3	South Korea Puerto Rico	Cuba absent	
2	1981	Montreal, Canada	Maurice Richard Arena	November 11–18	Soviet Union	Cuba	4–4	United States Canada		
3	1983	Rome, Italy	Palazzo dello Sport	October 17–22	Cuba	Soviet Union	4–3	Italy South Korea		
4	1985	Seoul, South Korea	Jamsil Arena	November 2–6	South Korea	Soviet Union	4–4	East Germany United States	Cuba absent	
5	1987	(Socialist Federal Republic of Yugoslavia) Belgrade, Yugoslavia		October 26–31	Cuba	East Germany	5–3	Soviet Union (Socialist Federal Republic of Yugoslavia) Yugoslavia	United States absent	
6	1990	Havana, Cuba	Sports City Coliseum	February 18–24	Cuba	Soviet Union	4–0	East Germany Turkey	1st stage	
6	1990	(Republic of Ireland) Dublin, Ireland		September 1–8	Cuba	East Germany	3–1	West Germany Soviet Union	2nd stage	
6	1990	Bombay, India	Bombay Gymkhana	November 10–17	Cuba	United States	3–1	Canada Bulgaria	3rd stage	
7	1994	Bangkok, Thailand	Thammasat Sport Centre	June ?–11	Germany	Cuba	3–2	Kazakhstan Uzbekistan		
8	1998	Chongqing, China		June	Cuba	Thailand	9–1	Uzbekistan China		
8	1998	Beijing, China		June	Cuba	Thailand	9–1	Uzbekistan China		
9	2002	Astana, Kazakhstan	Kazakhstan Sports Palace	June 3–8	Cuba	Kazakhstan	7–5	Thailand Russia		
1 (w)	2004	Tonsberg, Norway	Quality Hotel	April 28 – May 1	China	Italy	3–3	Turkey India	Cuba absent Russia absent	
10	2005	Moscow, Russia	Luzhniki Minor Arena	July 12–17	Russia	Cuba	7–4	Azerbaijan Kazakhstan		
11	2006	Baku, Azerbaijan	Baku Sports Palace	October 15–22	Cuba	Russia	6–5	Azerbaijan Ukraine		
12	2008	Moscow, Russia	Megasport Sport Palace	December 5–15	Cuba	Russia	6–3	Armenia Philippines		

== Statistics by country ==
Country	Winners	Runner-up	Third place
Cuba	2 (2006, 2008)	1 (2005)	–
Russia	1 (2005)	2 (2006, 2008)	–
Azerbaijan	–	–	2 (2005, 2006)
Armenia	–	–	1 (2008)

Notes

- In 2005, there was a group stage followed by knock-out system and there were a semi-finals.
- In 2006, the third place was shared between the two teams that finished second in their groups.
- In 2008, the results were based on the medal table after the individual competitions.

== United States Olympic Cup ==
Edition	Year	Host	Venue	Dates	Winner	Final score	Notes	Refs
1	1990	(United States) Salt Lake City, Utah	Salt Palace Exhibition Hall	June 23	North America	11–3dgr	North America vs. Europe team duals at the multi-sport event	
2	1999	(United States) San Diego, California	University of California—San Diego	September 9–10	Ukraine		individual contest at the multi-sport event	

== See also ==
- IBA World Boxing Championships
