= Boxing at the 2002 Asian Games =

Boxing competitions

- Venue: Masan Gymnasium
- Dates: 2–13 October 2002
- Competitors: 161 from 32 nations

Boxing was one of the many sports which was held at the 2002 Asian Games in Masan Gymnasium, Masan, South Korea between 2 and 13 October 2002.

The competition included only men's events.

== Schedule ==
P	Round of 32	R	Round of 16	¼	Quarterfinals	½	Semifinals	F	Final

Event↓/Date →	2nd Wed	3rd Thu	4th Fri	5th Sat	6th Sun	7th Mon	8th Tue	9th Wed	10th Thu	11th Fri	12th Sat	13th Sun
Men's 48 kg	P		R				¼				½	F
Men's 51 kg				R		¼				½		F
Men's 54 kg	P	R			¼						½	F
Men's 57 kg	P				R		¼			½		F
Men's 60 kg	P					R		¼			½	F
Men's 63.5 kg	R						¼			½		F
Men's 67 kg		R						¼			½	F
Men's 71 kg			R				¼			½		F
Men's 75 kg				R				¼			½	F
Men's 81 kg						¼				½		F
Men's 91 kg								¼			½	F
Men's +91 kg					R	¼				½		F

== Medalists ==
Event	Gold	Silver	Bronze
Light flyweight (48 kg)	Kim Ki-suk; South Korea	Harry Tañamor; Philippines	Mekhrodj Umarov; Tajikistan
Light flyweight (48 kg)	Kim Ki-suk; South Korea	Harry Tañamor; Philippines	Suban Pannon; Thailand
Flyweight (51 kg)	Somjit Jongjohor; Thailand	Nauman Karim; Pakistan	Kim Tae-kyu; South Korea
Flyweight (51 kg)	Somjit Jongjohor; Thailand	Nauman Karim; Pakistan	Zou Gang; China
Bantamweight (54 kg)	Kim Won-il; South Korea	Bekzod Khidirov; Uzbekistan	Abdusalom Khasanov; Tajikistan
Bantamweight (54 kg)	Kim Won-il; South Korea	Bekzod Khidirov; Uzbekistan	Taalaibek Kadiraliev; Kyrgyzstan
Featherweight (57 kg)	Mehrullah Lassi; Pakistan	Galib Jafarov; Kazakhstan	Yasser Sheikhan; Syria
Featherweight (57 kg)	Mehrullah Lassi; Pakistan	Galib Jafarov; Kazakhstan	Chen Tongzhou; China
Lightweight (60 kg)	Dilshod Mahmudov; Uzbekistan	Baik Jong-sub; South Korea	Ruslan Mussinov; Kazakhstan
Lightweight (60 kg)	Dilshod Mahmudov; Uzbekistan	Baik Jong-sub; South Korea	Adnan Yusoh; Malaysia
Light welterweight (63.5 kg)	Nurzhan Karimzhanov; Kazakhstan	Asghar Ali Shah; Pakistan	Shin Myung-hoon; South Korea
Light welterweight (63.5 kg)	Nurzhan Karimzhanov; Kazakhstan	Asghar Ali Shah; Pakistan	Bakhyt Sarsekbayev; Uzbekistan
Welterweight (67 kg)	Kim Jung-joo; South Korea	Sergey Rychko; Kazakhstan	Manon Boonjumnong; Thailand
Welterweight (67 kg)	Kim Jung-joo; South Korea	Sergey Rychko; Kazakhstan	Sherzod Husanov; Uzbekistan
Light middleweight (71 kg)	Gennady Golovkin; Kazakhstan	Suriya Prasathinphimai; Thailand	Song In-joon; South Korea
Light middleweight (71 kg)	Gennady Golovkin; Kazakhstan	Suriya Prasathinphimai; Thailand	Sirojiddin Naimov; Uzbekistan
Middleweight (75 kg)	Utkirbek Haydarov; Uzbekistan	Ahmed Ali Khan; Pakistan	Moon Young-seung; South Korea
Middleweight (75 kg)	Utkirbek Haydarov; Uzbekistan	Ahmed Ali Khan; Pakistan	Baurzhan Kairmenov; Kazakhstan
Light heavyweight (81 kg)	Ikrom Berdiev; Uzbekistan	Choi Ki-soo; South Korea	Munir Abukeshek; Palestine
Light heavyweight (81 kg)	Ikrom Berdiev; Uzbekistan	Choi Ki-soo; South Korea	Aleksey Katulevsky; Kyrgyzstan
Heavyweight (91 kg)	Sergey Mihaylov; Uzbekistan	Shaukat Ali; Pakistan	Lee Hyun-sung; South Korea
Heavyweight (91 kg)	Sergey Mihaylov; Uzbekistan	Shaukat Ali; Pakistan	Nasser Al-Shami; Syria
Super heavyweight (+91 kg)	Rustam Saidov; Uzbekistan	Mukhtarkhan Dildabekov; Kazakhstan	Zhang Junlong; China
Super heavyweight (+91 kg)	Rustam Saidov; Uzbekistan	Mukhtarkhan Dildabekov; Kazakhstan	Muzaffar Iqbal Mirza; Pakistan

== Medal table ==
Rank	Nation	Gold	Silver	Bronze	Total
1	Uzbekistan (UZB)	5	1	3	9
2	South Korea (KOR)	3	2	5	10
3	Kazakhstan (KAZ)	2	3	2	7
4	Pakistan (PAK)	1	4	1	6
5	Thailand (THA)	1	1	2	4
6	Philippines (PHI)	0	1	0	1
7	China (CHN)	0	0	3	3
8	Kyrgyzstan (KGZ)	0	0	2	2
8	Syria (SYR)	0	0	2	2
8	Tajikistan (TJK)	0	0	2	2
11	Malaysia (MAS)	0	0	1	1
11	Palestine (PLE)	0	0	1	1
Totals (12 entries)		12	12	24	48

== Participating nations ==
A total of 161 athletes from 32 nations competed in boxing at the 2002 Asian Games:

- Afghanistan (6)
- Bangladesh (2)
- Cambodia (6)
- China (8)
- Chinese Taipei (2)
- India (8)
- Indonesia (2)
- Japan (5)
- Jordan (1)
- Kazakhstan (10)
- Kuwait (2)
- Kyrgyzstan (9)
- Laos (4)
- Lebanon (1)
- Macau (4)
- Malaysia (2)
- Mongolia (8)
- Myanmar (1)
- Nepal (8)
- North Korea (5)
- Pakistan (10)
- Palestine (2)
- Philippines (8)
- Qatar (3)
- South Korea (12)
- Sri Lanka (3)
- Syria (3)
- Tajikistan (3)
- Thailand (9)
- Timor-Leste (2)
- Turkmenistan (2)
- Uzbekistan (10)
