= Philippines at the 2004 Summer Olympics =

- Flag of the Philippines
- IOC code: PHI
- NOC: Philippine Olympic Committee
- Website: www.olympic.ph

in Athens
- Competitors: 16 in 6 sports
- Flag bearer: Romeo Brin
- Medals: Gold 0 Silver 0 Bronze 0 Total 0

Summer Olympics appearances (overview)
- 1924; 1928; 1932; 1936; 1948; 1952; 1956; 1960; 1964; 1968; 1972; 1976; 1980; 1984; 1988; 1992; 1996; 2000; 2004; 2008; 2012; 2016; 2020; 2024

The Philippines competed at the 2004 Summer Olympics in Athens, from 13 to 29 August 2004. This was the nation's eighteenth appearance at the Olympics, except the 1980 Summer Olympics in Moscow because of its partial support to the United States boycott.

The Philippine Olympic Committee (POC) sent a total of 16 athletes, 12 men and 4 women, competing in 6 sports. Five Filipino athletes had previously competed in Sydney, including taekwondo jin and SEA Games champion Donald Geisler and boxing veteran Romeo Brin, who became the nation's flag bearer in the opening ceremony. Brin's teammate and boxer Christopher Camat was originally selected by the committee to carry the flag, but surpassed his lifetime privilege to the veteran, as he decided to witness his action and prepare for the next day's opening bout.

Philippines left Athens without a single Olympic medal for the second consecutive time. Among all the athletes, welterweight taekwondo jin Mary Antoinette Rivero only progressed further into the semifinals, where she lost the match to host nation's Elisavet Mystakidou and the second repechage bout to South Korea's Hwang Kyung-Seon, leaving the Filipino squad without a single Olympic medal for the second straight time.

== Archery ==
One Filipino archer qualified for the women's individual archery.

Athlete	Event	Ranking round		Round of 64	Round of 32	Round of 16	Quarterfinals	Semifinals	Final / BM	
Athlete	Event	Score	Seed	Opposition Score	Opposition Score	Opposition Score	Opposition Score	Opposition Score	Opposition Score	Rank
Jasmin Figueroa	Women's individual	600	56	Valeeva (ITA) (9); W 132–130	Gallardo (ESP) (19); L 150–152	Did not advance				

== Athletics ==
Filipino athletes have so far achieved qualifying standards in the following athletics events (up to a maximum of 3 athletes in each event at the 'A' Standard, and 1 at the 'B' Standard).

Men
Track & road events

Athlete	Event	Final	
Athlete	Event	Result	Rank
Eduardo Buenavista	Marathon	2:28:18	67

Women
Field events

Athlete	Event	Qualification		Final	
Athlete	Event	Distance	Position	Distance	Position
Lerma Gabito	Long jump	6.31	33	Did not advance	

Key

- Note–Ranks given for track events are within the athlete's heat only
- Q = Qualified for the next round
- q = Qualified for the next round as a fastest loser or, in field events, by position without achieving the qualifying target
- NR = National record
- N/A = Round not applicable for the event
- Bye = Athlete not required to compete in round

== Boxing ==
Filipino boxers qualified for the following events:

Athlete	Event	Round of 32	Round of 16	Quarterfinals	Semifinals	Final	
Athlete	Event	Opposition Result	Opposition Result	Opposition Result	Opposition Result	Opposition Result	Rank
Harry Tañamor	Light flyweight	Dostiev (TJK); W 17–12	Hong M-W (KOR); L 25–42	Did not advance			
Violito Payla	Flyweight	Doniyorov (UZB); L 26–36	Did not advance				
Romeo Brin	Light welterweight	Bogere (SWE); W 43–35	Boonjumnong (THA); L 15–29	Did not advance			
Christopher Camat	Middleweight	Gaydarbekov (RUS); L 13–35	Did not advance				

== Shooting ==
Men

Athlete	Event	Qualification		Final	
Athlete	Event	Points	Rank	Points	Rank
Jethro Dionisio	Trap	109	32	Did not advance	

== Swimming ==
Filipino swimmers have achieved qualifying standards in the following events (up to a maximum of 2 swimmers in each event at the A-standard, and 1 at the B-standard):

Men

Athlete	Event	Heat		Semifinal		Final	
Athlete	Event	Time	Rank	Time	Rank	Time	Rank
Raphael Matthew Chua	100 m breaststroke	1:06.37	50	Did not advance			
Miguel Mendoza	400 m freestyle	4:01.99	36	—		Did not advance	
Miguel Mendoza	1500 m freestyle	16:26.52	34	—		Did not advance	
Miguel Molina	200 m freestyle	1:53.81	42	Did not advance			
Miguel Molina	200 m breaststroke	2:19.19	38	Did not advance			
Miguel Molina	200 m individual medley	2:05.28	33	Did not advance			
Miguel Molina	400 m individual medley	4:33.25	34	—		Did not advance	
James Walsh	200 m butterfly	2:06.76	37	Did not advance			

Women

Athlete	Event	Heat		Semifinal		Final	
Athlete	Event	Time	Rank	Time	Rank	Time	Rank
Jaclyn Pangilinan	100 m breaststroke	1:12.47	31	Did not advance			
Jaclyn Pangilinan	200 m breaststroke	2:33.38	20	Did not advance			

== Taekwondo ==
Three Filipino taekwondo jin qualified for the following events:

Athlete	Event	Round of 16	Quarterfinals	Semifinals	Repechage 1	Repechage 2	Final / BM	
Athlete	Event	Opposition Result	Opposition Result	Opposition Result	Opposition Result	Opposition Result	Opposition Result	Rank
Tshomlee Go	Men's −58 kg	Ramos (ESP); L 6–7	Did not advance					
Donald Geisler	Men's −80 kg	Tanrıkulu (TUR); L 9–9 SUP	Did not advance		Hamdouni (TUN); L RSC	Did not advance		7
Mary Antoinette Rivero	Women's −67 kg	Sánchez (ARG); W 10–10 SUP	Sobers (NED); W 10–4	Mystakidou (GRE); L 2–3	Bye	Hwang K-S (KOR); L 2–6	Did not advance	5

== See also ==
- Philippines at the 2002 Asian Games
- Philippines at the 2004 Summer Paralympics
