= Boxing at the 2004 Summer Olympics – Light welterweight =

Boxing competitions

Light welterweight boxing at the Games of the XXVIII Olympiad
- Venue: Peristeri Olympic Boxing Hall
- Date: 15–28 August 2004
- Competitors: 27 from 27 nations

Medalists
1st place, gold medalist(s)		Manus Boonjumnong	Thailand
2nd place, silver medalist(s)		Yudel Johnson	Cuba
3rd place, bronze medalist(s)		Boris Georgiev	Bulgaria
3rd place, bronze medalist(s)		Ionuţ Gheorghe	Romania

The light welterweight boxing competition at the 2004 Summer Olympics in Athens was held from 15 to 28 August at Peristeri Olympic Boxing Hall. This is limited to those boxers weighing between 60 and 64 kilograms.

== Competition format ==
Like all Olympic boxing events, the competition was a straight single-elimination tournament. This event consisted of 27 boxers who have qualified for the competition through various tournaments held in 2003 and 2004. The competition began with a preliminary round on 15 August, where the number of competitors was reduced to 16, and concluded with the final on 28 August. As there were fewer than 32 boxers in the competition, a number of boxers received a bye through the preliminary round. Both semi-final losers were awarded bronze medals.

All bouts consisted of four rounds of two minutes each, with one-minute breaks between rounds. Punches scored only if the white area on the front of the glove made full contact with the front of the head or torso of the opponent. Five judges scored each bout; three of the judges had to signal a scoring punch within one second for the punch to score. The winner of the bout was the boxer who scored the most valid punches by the end of the bout.

== Schedule ==
All times are Greece Standard Time (UTC+2)

Date	Time	Round
Sunday, 15 August 2004	13:30 & 19:30	Round of 32
Thursday, 19 August 2004	19:30	Round of 16
Sunday, 22 August 2004	19:30	Quarterfinals
Friday, 27 August 2004	13:30	Semifinals
Saturday, 28 August 2004	19:30	Final

== Qualifying Athletes ==
Athlete	Country
Davis Mwale	Zambia
Yudel Johnson	Cuba
Dilshod Mahmudov	Uzbekistan
Alessandro Matos	Brazil
Rock Allen	United States
Boris Georgiev	Bulgaria
Nasserredine Fillali	Algeria
Hicham Nafil	Morocco
Isidro Mosquea	Dominican Republic
Juan de Dios Navarro	Mexico
Nurzhan Karimzhanov	Kazakhstan
Spyridon Ionnidis	Greece
Manus Boonjumnong	Thailand
Patrick Bogere	Sweden
Romeo Brin	Philippines
Mohamed Ali Sassi	Tunisia
Willy Blain	France
Saleh Khoulef	Egypt
Alexander Maletin	Russia
Faisal Karim	Pakistan
Ionuţ Gheorghe	Romania
Mustafa Karagöllü	Turkey
Vijender Singh	India
Michele di Rocco	Italy
Patrick López	Venezuela
Kitson Julie	Seychelles
Anoushiravan Nourian	Australia

== Results ==
Round of 32
Boris Georgiev (BUL)	RSC
Nasserredine Fillali (ALG)
Hicham Nafil (MAR)	42
Isidro Mosquea (DOM)	40
Juan de Dios Navarro (MEX)	31
Nurzhan Karimzhanov (KAZ)	48
Spyridon Ioannidis (GRE)	16
Manus Boonjumnong (THA)	28
Patrick Bogere (SWE)	35
Romeo Brin (PHI)	43
Mohamed Ali Sassi (TUN)	14
Willy Blain (FRA)	36
Saleh Khoulef (EGY)
Alexander Maletin (RUS)	RSC
Faisal Karim (PAK)	11
Ionuţ Gheorghe (ROM)	26
Mustafa Karagöllü (TUR)	25
Vijender Singh (IND)	20
Michele di Rocco (ITA)	37
Patrick López (VEN)	30
Kitson Julie (SEY)	22
Anoushiravan Nourian (AUS)	51

Round of 16
Davis Mwale (ZAM)
Yudel Johnson (CUB)	RSC
Dilshod Mahmudov (UZB)	26
Alessandro de Matos (BRA)	16
Rock Allen (USA)	10
Boris Georgiev (BUL)	30
Hicham Nafil (MAR)	13
Nurzhan Karimzhanov (KAZ)	33
Manus Boonjumnong (THA)	29
Romeo Brin (PHI)	15
Willy Blain (FRA)	28
Alexander Maletin (RUS)	20
Ionuţ Gheorghe (ROM)	28
Mustafa Karagöllü (TUR)	19
Michele di Rocco (ITA)	33
Anoushiravan Nourian (AUS)	25

Quarterfinals
Yudel Johnson (CUB)	32
Dilshod Mahmudov (UZB)	28
Boris Georgiev (BUL)	20
Nurzhan Karimzhanov (KAZ)	18
Manus Boonjumnong (THA)	20
Willy Blain (FRA)	8
Ionuţ Gheorghe (ROM)	29
Michele di Rocco (ITA)	18

Semifinals
Yudel Johnson (CUB)	13
Boris Georgiev (BUL)	9
Manus Boonjumnong (THA)	30
Ionuţ Gheorghe (ROM)	9

Finals
Yudel Johnson (CUB)	11
Manus Boonjumnong (THA)	17

Notes

- Davis Mwale (Zambia) replaced All-Africa Games champion Davidson Emenogu (Nigeria), who later tested positive for a diuretic.
