= Boxing at the 2006 Asian Games – Men's 64 kg =

Boxing competitions

Men's 64 kg at the 2006 Asian Games
- Venue: Aspire Hall 5
- Date: 2–12 December 2006
- Competitors: 24 from 24 nations

Medalists
| gold medal | Manus Boonjumnong | Thailand |
| silver medal | Shin Myung-hoon | South Korea |
| bronze medal | Dilshod Mahmudov | Uzbekistan |
| bronze medal | Serik Sapiyev | Kazakhstan |

The men's light welterweight (64 kilograms) event at the 2006 Asian Games took place from 2 to 12 December 2006 at Aspire Hall 5, Doha, Qatar.

== Schedule ==
All times are Arabia Standard Time (UTC+03:00)

| Date | Time | Event |
|---|---|---|
| Saturday, 2 December 2006 | 14:00 | Qualification |
| Tuesday, 5 December 2006 | 14:00 | Preliminary |
| Thursday, 7 December 2006 | 14:00 | Quarterfinals |
| Sunday, 10 December 2006 | 14:00 | Semifinals |
| Tuesday, 12 December 2006 | 14:00 | Final |

== Results ==
Legend

- RSCO — Won by referee stop contest outscored

=== Final ===
| Final |
| Shin Myung-hoon (KOR) | 11 |
| Manus Boonjumnong (THA) | 22 |

=== Top half ===
Qualification

Preliminary
Dilshod Mahmudov (UZB) | 19
Sabah Al-Sabah (KUW) | 3
Sushil Ghimire (NEP) | 11
Wasala Wekadapola (SRI) | 19
Mohammad Naim Amini (AFG) | 13
Zuhir Khudair (IRQ) | 34
Delfin Boholst (PHI) | 12
Shin Myung-hoon (KOR) | 31

Quarterfinals
Dilshod Mahmudov (UZB) | RSCO
Wasala Wekadapola (SRI)
Zuhir Khudair (IRQ) | 10
Shin Myung-hoon (KOR) | 29

Semifinals
Dilshod Mahmudov (UZB) | 20
Shin Myung-hoon (KOR) | 23

=== Bottom half ===
Qualification
Xia Wenjie (CHN) | 35
Mohammed Abdulla (QAT) | 13
Manus Boonjumnong (THA) | 16
Byambyn Tüvshinbat (MGL) | 7
Ergazy Murzakerimov (KGZ) | RSCO
Wael Shahin (LIB)
Morteza Sepahvand (IRI) | RSCO
Abdallah Hawawreh (JOR)
Khurshed Djuraev (TJK) | 17
Berdimyrat Sahatow (TKM) | 20
Serik Sapiyev (KAZ) | RSCO
Muhammad Zakir (PAK)
Mabkhot Hadadi (KSA) | 30
Tsai Yao-chun (TPE) | 42
Manoj Kumar (IND) | RSCO
Qassim Al-Barout (UAE)

Preliminary
Xia Wenjie (CHN) | 11
Manus Boonjumnong (THA) | 14
Ergazy Murzakerimov (KGZ) | 12
Morteza Sepahvand (IRI) | 32
Berdimyrat Sahatow (TKM)
Serik Sapiyev (KAZ) | RSCO
Tsai Yao-chun (TPE) | 10
Manoj Kumar (IND) | 25

Quarterfinals
Manus Boonjumnong (THA) | 14
Morteza Sepahvand (IRI) | 10
Serik Sapiyev (KAZ) | RSCO
Manoj Kumar (IND)

Semifinals
Manus Boonjumnong (THA) | 22
Serik Sapiyev (KAZ) | 18
