= 1st AIBA Asian 2004 Olympic Qualifying Tournament =

The 1st AIBA Asian 2004 Olympic Boxing Qualifying Tournament was held in Guangzhou, PR China from March 18 to March 23, 2004. It was the first chance for amateur boxers from Asia to qualify for the 2004 Summer Olympics after the 2004 Asian Amateur Boxing Championships in Puerto Princesa, Philippines from January 11 to 18, 2004. The top two boxers in each weight division gained a place in the Olympics, with the exception of the heavyweight and super heavyweight divisions in which just the winner was entered.

== Medal winners ==
Event	Gold	Silver	Bronze
Light Flyweight (– 48 kilograms)	Sherali Dostiev (TJK)	Suban Pannon (THA)	Toshiyuki Igarashi (JPN) Gu Seung-Hyeok (KOR)
Flyweight (– 51 kilograms)	Tulashboy Doniyorov (UZB)	Akhil Kumar (IND)	Guo Xianchuan (CHN) Kim Un-Chol (PRK)
Bantamweight (– 54 kilograms)	Mehrullah Lassi (PAK)	Liu Yuan (CHN)	Ougonchulun Batkhuu (MGL) Diwakar Prasad (IND)
Featherweight (– 57 kilograms)	Kim Song-Guk (PRK)	Somluck Kamsing (THA)	Abdusalom Khasanov (TJK) Xiong Zhaorong (CHN)
Lightweight (– 60 kilograms)	Serik Yeleuov (KAZ)	Mohammad Asheri (IRI)	Ramanand (IND) Chen Tongzhou (CHN)
Light Welterweight (– 64 kilograms)	Manus Boonjumnong (THA)	Nurzhan Karimzhanov (KAZ)	Yang Hyun-Tae (KOR) Morteza Sepahvand (IRI)
Welterweight (– 69 kilograms)	Hanati Silamu (CHN)	Aliasker Bashirov (TKM)	Aliszer Samiev (TJK) Nisar Ahmed (PAK)
Middleweight (– 75 kilograms)	Ha Dabateer (CHN)	Sherzod Abdurahmonov (UZB)	Benny Elopere (IND) Cho Deok-Jin (KOR)
Light Heavyweight (– 81 kilograms)	Song Hak-Seong (KOR)	Jitender Kumar (IND)	Reza Gharouni (IRI) Noder Gulanov (UZB)
Heavyweight (– 91 kilograms)	Igor Alborov (UZB)	Pavel Storozhuk (KAZ)	Ayoub Pourtaghi Ghoushchi (IRI) Ali Khalil Salman (IRQ)
Super Heavyweight (+ 91 kilograms)	Mukhtarkhan Dildabekov (KAZ)	Ruslan Abasov (KGZ)	Rouhollah Hosseini (IRI) Zhang Junlong (CHN)

== Qualified ==
=== Light Flyweight (– 48 kg) ===
- Sherali Dostiev (TJK)
- Suban Pannon (THA)

=== Flyweight (– 51 kg) ===
- Tulashboy Doniyorov (UZB)
- Akhil Kumar (IND)

=== Bantamweight (– 54 kg) ===
- Mehrullah Lassi (PAK)
- Liu Yuan (CHN)

=== Featherweight (– 57 kg) ===
- Kim Song-Guk (PRK)
- Somluck Kamsing (THA)

=== Lightweight (– 60 kg) ===
- Serik Yeleuov (KAZ)
- Mohammad Asheri (IRI)

=== Light Welterweight (– 64 kg) ===
- Manus Boonjumnong (THA)
- Nurzhan Karimzhanov (KAZ)

=== Welterweight (– 69 kg) ===
- Hanati Silamu (CHN)
- Aliasker Bashirov (TKM)

=== Middleweight (– 75 kg) ===
- Ha Dabateer (CHN)
- Sherzod Abdurahmonov (UZB)

=== Light Heavyweight (– 81 kg) ===
- Song Hak-Seong (KOR)
- Jitender Kumar (IND)

=== Heavyweight (– 91 kg) ===
- Igor Alborov (UZB)

=== Super Heavyweight (+ 91 kg) ===
- Mukhtarkhan Dildabekov (KAZ)

== See also ==
- 2004 Asian Amateur Boxing Championships
- 2nd AIBA Asian 2004 Olympic Qualifying Tournament
