= 1st AIBA American 2004 Olympic Qualifying Tournament =

The 1st AIBA American 2004 Olympic Boxing Qualifying Tournament was held in Tijuana, Mexico from March 12 to March 20, 2004. It was the first chance for amateur boxers from North-, Central- and South America to qualify for the 2004 Summer Olympics after the 2003 Pan American Games in Santo Domingo, Dominican Republic. The top two boxers in each weight division gained a place in the Olympics, with the exception of the heavyweight and super heavyweight divisions in which just the winner was entered.

== Medal winners ==
Event	Gold	Silver	Bronze
Light Flyweight (– 48 kilograms)	Rau'shee Warren (USA)	Raúl Castañeda (MEX)	Miguel Ángel Miranda (VEN) César Seda (PUR)
Flyweight (– 51 kilograms)	Ron Siler (USA)	Joseph Serrano (PUR)	Jonny Mendoza (VEN) Israel Reyes (MEX)
Bantamweight (– 54 kilograms)	Andrew Kooner (CAN)	Juan Manuel López (PUR)	Argenis Mendez (DOM) Alexander Espinoza (VEN)
Featherweight (– 57 kilograms)	Luis Franco (CUB)	Carlos Velasquez (PUR)	Jhon Ortega (VEN) Luis Dominguez (MEX)
Lightweight (– 60 kilograms)	Vicente Escobedo (USA)	Manuel Félix Díaz (DOM)	José Lopez (GUA) Jaider Parra (VEN)
Light Welterweight (– 64 kilograms)	Juan de Dios Navarro (MEX)	Alessandro Matos (BRA)	Juan Zúñiga (COL) Marcos Maidana (ARG)
Welterweight (– 69 kilograms)	Vanes Martirosyan (USA)	Andre Berto (HAI)	Juan Camilo Novoa (COL) Adam Trupish (CAN)
Middleweight (– 75 kilograms)	Andre Dirrell (USA)	Alfredo Angulo (MEX)	Jean Pascal (CAN) Elie Augustama (HAI)
Light Heavyweight (– 81 kilograms)	Edgar Muñoz (VEN)	Andre Ward (USA)	Trevor Stewardson (CAN) Julio Domínguez (ARG)
Heavyweight (– 91 kilograms)	Devin Vargas (USA)	Jason Douglas (CAN)	Kertson Manswell (TRI) Rafael Lima (BRA)
Super Heavyweight (+ 91 kilograms)	Michel López Núñez (CUB)	George García (MEX)	Bermane Stiverne (CAN) Rafael Zumbano (BRA)

== Qualified ==
=== Light Flyweight (– 48 kg) ===
- Rau'shee Warren (USA)
- Raúl Castañeda (MEX)

=== Flyweight (– 51 kg) ===
- Ron Siler (USA)
- Joseph Serrano (PUR)

=== Bantamweight (– 54 kg) ===
- Andrew Kooner (CAN)
- Juan Manuel López (PUR)

=== Featherweight (– 57 kg) ===
- Luis Franco (CUB)
- Carlos Velasquez (PUR)

=== Lightweight (– 60 kg) ===
- Vicente Escobedo (USA)
- Manuel Félix Díaz (DOM)

=== Light Welterweight (– 64 kg) ===
- Juan de Dios Navarro (MEX)
- Alessandro Matos (BRA)

=== Welterweight (– 69 kg) ===
- Vanes Martirosyan (USA)
- Andre Berto (HAI)

=== Middleweight (– 75 kg) ===
- Andre Dirrell (USA)
- Alfredo Angulo (MEX)

=== Light Heavyweight (– 81 kg) ===
- Edgar Muñoz (VEN)
- Andre Ward (USA)

=== Heavyweight (– 91 kg) ===
- Devin Vargas (USA)

=== Super Heavyweight (+ 91 kg) ===
- Michel López Núñez (CUB)

== See also ==
- Boxing at the 2003 Pan American Games
- 2nd AIBA American 2004 Olympic Qualifying Tournament
