= Boonjumnong =

Boonjumnong is a surname. Notable people with the surname include:

- Manus Boonjumnong (born 1980), Thai boxer
- Non Boonjumnong (born 1982), Thai boxer, brother of Manus
