= Shin Myung-hoon =

South Korean boxer (born 1981)

Shin Myung Hoon
Personal information
- Born: November 16, 1981 (age 44)

Sport
- Sport: Boxing
- Weight class: Light welterweight
Medal record
Men's boxing
Representing South Korea
Asian Games
Silver medal – second place	2006 Doha	Light welterweight
Bronze medal – third place	2002 Busan	Light welterweight
Asian Championships
Silver medal – second place	2002 Seremban	Light welterweight

Shin Myung Hoon (born November 16, 1981) is an amateur boxer from South Korea who has medaled repeatedly at Asian Games.

== Career ==
He won a bronze in 2002.

He also competed at the 2006 Asian Games in the Light welterweight (-64 kg) division ere he upset Dilshod Mahmudov and won the silver medal in the bout against Thailand's Olympic champion Manus Boonjumnong (11-22).
