= 2002 Asian Amateur Boxing Championships =

Boxing competitions

2002 Asian Boxing Championships
- Host city: Seremban, Malaysia
- Dates: 18–25 June 2002
- Main venue: Paroi Centre Court Sports Complex

The 21st edition of the Men's Asian Amateur Boxing Championships were held from June 18 to June 25, 2002 in Paroi Centre Court Sports Complex, Seremban, Malaysia. Uzbekistan dominated the competition, winning five gold medals.

== Medal summary ==
Event	Gold	Silver	Bronze
Light flyweight 48 kg	Hong Moo-won; South Korea	Lhyven Salazar; Philippines	Kyaw Swar Aung; Myanmar
Light flyweight 48 kg	Hong Moo-won; South Korea	Lhyven Salazar; Philippines	Suban Pannon; Thailand
Flyweight; 51 kg	Somjit Jongjohor; Thailand	Mai Kangde; China	Tulashboy Doniyorov; Uzbekistan
Flyweight; 51 kg	Somjit Jongjohor; Thailand	Mai Kangde; China	Aman Matybayev; Kazakhstan
Bantamweight; 54 kg	Bekzod Khidirov; Uzbekistan	Chotipat Wongprates; Thailand	Ferdie Gamo; Philippines
Bantamweight; 54 kg	Bekzod Khidirov; Uzbekistan	Chotipat Wongprates; Thailand	Choe Phyong-chol; North Korea
Featherweight; 57 kg	Haider Ali; Pakistan	Suttisak Samaksaman; Thailand	Chen Tongzhou; China
Featherweight; 57 kg	Haider Ali; Pakistan	Suttisak Samaksaman; Thailand	Uranchimegiin Mönkh-Erdene; Mongolia
Lightweight; 60 kg	Adnan Yusoh; Malaysia	Yousef Hamidi; Syria	Somluck Kamsing; Thailand
Lightweight; 60 kg	Adnan Yusoh; Malaysia	Yousef Hamidi; Syria	Tserennadmidyn Mönkhchuluun; Mongolia
Light welterweight 63.5 kg	Bakhyt Sarsekbayev; Uzbekistan	Shin Myung-hoon; South Korea	Asghar Ali Shah; Pakistan
Light welterweight 63.5 kg	Bakhyt Sarsekbayev; Uzbekistan	Shin Myung-hoon; South Korea	Samal Bissenov; Kazakhstan
Welterweight; 67 kg	Manon Boonjumnong; Thailand	Bakhtiyar Artayev; Kazakhstan	Jon Ryon-hyok; North Korea
Welterweight; 67 kg	Manon Boonjumnong; Thailand	Bakhtiyar Artayev; Kazakhstan	Sherzod Husanov; Uzbekistan
Light middleweight 71 kg	Ha Dabateer; China	Kymbatbek Ryskulov; Kyrgyzstan	Waiyavit Narerak; Thailand
Light middleweight 71 kg	Ha Dabateer; China	Kymbatbek Ryskulov; Kyrgyzstan	Andrey Permyakov; Kazakhstan
Middleweight; 75 kg	Utkirbek Haydarov; Uzbekistan	Moon Young-seung; South Korea	Somchai Chimlun; Thailand
Middleweight; 75 kg	Utkirbek Haydarov; Uzbekistan	Moon Young-seung; South Korea	Maxat Baktybazarov; Kazakhstan
Light heavyweight 81 kg	Ikrom Berdiev; Uzbekistan	Mohammad Reza Gharouni; Iran	Harpreet Singh; India
Light heavyweight 81 kg	Ikrom Berdiev; Uzbekistan	Mohammad Reza Gharouni; Iran	Choi Ki-soo; South Korea
Heavyweight; 91 kg	Shaukat Ali; Pakistan	Rouhollah Hosseini; Iran	Nasser Al-Shami; Syria
Heavyweight; 91 kg	Shaukat Ali; Pakistan	Rouhollah Hosseini; Iran	Sergey Mihaylov; Uzbekistan
Super heavyweight +91 kg	Rustam Saidov; Uzbekistan	Alireza Esteki; Iran	Harpal Singh; India
Super heavyweight +91 kg	Rustam Saidov; Uzbekistan	Alireza Esteki; Iran	Zhang Junlong; China

== Medal table ==
Rank	Nation	Gold	Silver	Bronze	Total
1	Uzbekistan	5	0	3	8
2	Thailand	2	2	4	8
3	Pakistan	2	0	1	3
4	South Korea	1	2	1	4
5	China	1	1	2	4
6	Malaysia	1	0	0	1
7	Iran	0	3	0	3
8	Kazakhstan	0	1	4	5
9	Philippines	0	1	1	2
9	Syria	0	1	1	2
11	Kyrgyzstan	0	1	0	1
12	India	0	0	2	2
12	Mongolia	0	0	2	2
12	North Korea	0	0	2	2
15	Myanmar	0	0	1	1
Totals (15 entries)		12	12	24	48
