= Félix Díaz (boxer) =

Dominican boxer

Personal information
- Nationality: Dominican
- Born: Félix Manuel Díaz Guzman; 10 December 1983 (age 42) Santo Domingo, Dominican Republic
- Height: 5 ft 5 1/2 in (166 cm)
- Weight: Light welterweight; Welterweight

Boxing career
- Reach: 67 in (170 cm)
- Stance: Southpaw

Boxing record
- Total fights: 23
- Wins: 20
- Win by KO: 10
- Losses: 3
Medal record
Men's amateur boxing
Representing the Dominican Republic
Olympic Games
Gold medal – first place	2008 Beijing	Light welterweight
Pan American Games
Bronze medal – third place	2003 S. Domingo	Lightweight
Central American and Caribbean Games
Gold medal – first place	2002 San Salvador	Lightweight

Félix Manuel Díaz Guzman (born 10 December 1983) is a Dominican professional boxer who challenged for the unified WBC, WBO, and The Ring light welterweight titles in 2017. As an amateur he won a gold medal at the 2008 Olympics and bronze at the 2003 Pan American Games.

== Amateur career ==
The aggressive Southpaw brawler participated in the 2004 Summer Olympics for his native Caribbean country. There he lost 28:16 in the first round of the Lightweight (60 kg) division to Kazakhstan's eventual bronze medalist Serik Yeleuov.

At the PanAm Games 2007 he lost the quarterfinal 12:13 to Inocente Fiss. He qualified for the 2008 Olympics by defeating Myke Carvalho 8:6.

In Beijing though, he won all five bouts and after a controversial bout against Vastine, sensationally won Gold against reigning champion Manus Boonjumnong of Thailand. It was the nation's second ever Olympic gold after Félix Sánchez in 2004 and the second boxing medal after Pedro Nolasco won a bronze in Los Angeles in 1984.

=== Olympic games results ===
2004 (as a lightweight)

- Lost to Serik Yeleuov (Kazakhstan) 28–16

2008 (as a Light welterweight)

- Defeated Eduard Hambardzumyan (Armenia) 11–4
- Defeated John Joe Joyce (Ireland) 11–11
- Defeated Morteza Sepahvand (Iran) 11–6
- Defeated Alexis Vastine (France) 12–10
- Defeated Manus Boonjumnong (Thailand) 12–4

=== World amateur championships results ===
2007 (as a Light welterweight)

- Defeated Su Hsiao Ken (Chinese Taipei) RSC 1
- Lost to Masatsugu Kawachi (Japan) 14–15

Díaz ended his amateur career with a record of 280–40.

== Professional career ==
He turned pro in 2009. As a professional, he won a majority decision against Adrian Granados for the World Boxing Council Central American Boxing Federation title.

== Professional boxing record ==
23 fights	20 wins	3 losses
By knockout	10	1
By decision	10	2

No.	Result	Record	Opponent	Type	Round, time	Date	Location	Notes
23	Win	20–3	(Dominican Republic) Abrahan Peralta	KO	2 (10), 2:59	16 Mar 2019	Coliseo Carlos 'Teo' Cruz, Santo Domingo, Dominican Republic	
22	Loss	19–3	(United States) Francisco Santana	MD	10	27 Apr 2018	(United States) KFC Yum! Center, Louisville, Kentucky, US	
21	Loss	19–2	(United States) Terence Crawford	RTD	10 (12), 3:00	20 May 2017	(United States) Madison Square Garden, New York City, New York, US	For WBC, WBO, and The Ring light welterweight titles
20	Win	19–1	(Nicaragua) Levis Morales	TKO	6 (10), 1:07	16 Dec 2016	Maunoloa Night Club y Casino, Santo Domingo, Dominican Republic	
19	Win	18–1	(United States) Sammy Vasquez	UD	10	16 Jul 2016	(United States) Legacy Arena, Birmingham, Alabama, US	
18	Loss	17–1	(United States) Lamont Peterson	MD	12	17 Oct 2015	(United States) EagleBank Arena, Fairfax, Virginia, US	
17	Win	17–0	(Puerto Rico) Gabriel Bracero	UD	10	11 Apr 2015	(United States) Barclays Center, New York City, New York, US	
16	Win	16–0	(Mexico) Adrian Granados	MD	10	21 Nov 2014	(United States) Hard Rock Hotel & Casino, Tulsa, Oklahoma, US	
15	Win	15–0	(Ghana) Emmanuel Lartei Lartey	SD	8	18 Apr 2014	(United States) Convention Center, Monroeville, Pennsylvania, US	
14	Win	14–0	(Mexico) Edgar Llanes	KO	1 (10), 1:37	17 Aug 2013	El San Juan Resort and Casino, Isla Verse, Puerto Rico	
13	Win	13–0	(Dominican Republic) Ricardo Veras	TKO	3 (10), 0:44	8 Jun 2013	Polideportivo San Martin de Porre, La Romana, Dominican Republic	
12	Win	12–0	(Nicaragua) Wilfredo Acuna	UD	6	21 Jul 2012	(United States) Seminole Hard Rock Hotel and Casino, Hollywood, Florida, US	
11	Win	11–0	(Puerto Rico) Javier Perez	UD	8	18 May 2012	(United States) Seminole Hard Rock Hotel & Casino, Hollywood, Florida, US	
10	Win	10–0	(United States) Larry Smith	UD	8	16 Sep 2011	(United States) Texas Station Casino, North Las Vegas, Nevada, US	
9	Win	9–0	(Russia) Andrey Berdyshev	TKO	3 (8), 1:39	26 Mar 2011	DIVS, Ekaterinburg, Russia	
8	Win	8–0	(Colombia) Edinson Garcia	TD	5 (8), 1:12	29 Nov 2010	Coliseo Pepe Mayen, San Pedro de Macorís, Dominican Republic	
7	Win	7–0	(Cuba) Alex Perez	TKO	2 (8), 2:15	21 Aug 2010	Polideportivo Fabio Gonzalez, Puerto Plata, Dominican Republic	
6	Win	6–0	(United States) Broderick Antoine	TKO	8 (8), 0:35	14 Jul 2010	(United States) Asylum Arena, Philadelphia, Pennsylvania, US	
5	Win	5–0	(Nicaragua) Orlando Membreno	UD	6	12 Mar 2010	Sosua Bay Grand Casino, Puerto Plata, Dominican Republic	
4	Win	4–0	(Czech Republic) Bronislav Kubin	KO	3 (6), 1:49	23 Jan 2010	Kugelbake-Halle, Cuxhaven, Germany	
3	Win	3–0	(Russia) Vyacheslav Yakovenko	UD	4	24 Oct 2009	Sverdlovsk Film Studio, Ekaterinburg, Russia	
2	Win	2–0	(United States) Omar Brown	TKO	1 (4), 1:28	18 Sep 2009	(United States) Fontainbleau Hotel, Miami Beach, Florida, US	
1	Win	1–0	(Mexico) Hugo Pacheco	TKO	1 (6), 2:11	29 Jun 2009	Coliseo Carlos 'Teo' Cruz, Santo Domingo, Dominican Republic	
