= Juan de Dios Navarro =

Mexican boxer (born 1984)

Personal information
- Nationality: Mexican
- Born: Juan de Dios Navarro Ramírez; 18 July 1984 (age 42) Tenancingo, Tlaxcala
- Weight: Minimumweight; Light Flyweight; Flyweight; Super Flyweight

Boxing career

Boxing record
- Total fights: 4
- Wins: 4
- Win by KO: 2
Medal record
Men's Boxing
Pan American Games
Bronze medal – third place	Santo Domingo 2003	Light Welter

Juan de Dios Navarro Ramírez (born 18 July 1984) is a Mexican former boxer who represented his country in the 2004 Summer Olympics.

== Amateur career ==
Navarro was defeated in the first round of the Light welterweight (54 kg) division of the 2004 Summer Olympics by Kazakhstan's Nurzhan Karimzhanov.

Navarro won the bronze medal in the same division one year earlier, at the Pan American Games in Santo Domingo. He qualified for the Olympic Games by ending up in first place at the 1st AIBA American 2004 Olympic Qualifying Tournament in Tijuana, Mexico. He defeated Cuban Yudel Jhonson and Argentinian Marcos Maidana.

== Professional career ==
He has a record of 4 wins and no losses.
