= Boxing at the 2002 Asian Games – Men's 51 kg =

Boxing competitions

Men's 51 kg at the 2002 Asian Games
- Venue: Masan Gymnasium
- Date: 5–13 October 2002
- Competitors: 16 from 16 nations

Medalists
gold medal	Somjit Jongjohor	Thailand
silver medal	Nauman Karim	Pakistan
bronze medal	Kim Tae-kyu	South Korea
bronze medal	Zou Gang	China

The men's flyweight (51 kilograms) event at the 2002 Asian Games took place from 5 to 13 October 2002 at Masan Gymnasium, Masan, South Korea.

Like all Asian Games boxing events, the competition was a straight single-elimination tournament. This event consisted of sixteen boxers.

== Schedule ==
All times are Korea Standard Time (UTC+09:00)

Date	Time	Event
Saturday, 5 October 2002	14:00	Preliminary
Monday, 7 October 2002	14:00	Quarterfinals
Friday, 11 October 2002	14:00	Semifinals
Sunday, 13 October 2002	14:00	Final

== Results ==
Legend

- RSCO — Won by referee stop contest outclassed

Preliminary
Violito Payla (PHI)	31
Tulashboy Doniyorov (UZB)	26
Berik Serikbayev (KAZ)	9
Nauman Karim (PAK)	14
Kim Won-guk (PRK)	13
Kim Tae-kyu (KOR)	33
Otgonchuluuny Batkhüü (MGL)	RSCO
Roeung Sarath (CAM)
Somjit Jongjohor (THA)	16
Felix Barreto (TMP)	0
Kaoru Murahashi (JPN)	19
Nhothin Holapatiphone (LAO)	10
Anurudha Rathnayake (SRI)	RSCO
Ramesh Shrestha (NEP)
Rohullah Mustafa (AFG)
Zou Gang (CHN)	RSCO

Quarterfinals
Violito Payla (PHI)	19
Nauman Karim (PAK)	31
Kim Tae-kyu (KOR)	RSCO
Otgonchuluuny Batkhüü (MGL)
Somjit Jongjohor (THA)	16
Kaoru Murahashi (JPN)	4
Anurudha Rathnayake (SRI)	13
Zou Gang (CHN)	27

Semifinals
Nauman Karim (PAK)	23
Kim Tae-kyu (KOR)	14
Somjit Jongjohor (THA)	18
Zou Gang (CHN)	15

Final
Nauman Karim (PAK)	7
Somjit Jongjohor (THA)	26
