= Boxing at the 2002 Asian Games – Men's 63.5 kg =

Boxing competitions

Men's 63.5 kg at the 2002 Asian Games
- Venue: Masan Gymnasium
- Date: 2–13 October 2002
- Competitors: 14 from 14 nations

Medalists
gold medal	Nurzhan Karimzhanov	Kazakhstan
silver medal	Asghar Ali Shah	Pakistan
bronze medal	Shin Myung-hoon	South Korea
bronze medal	Bakhyt Sarsekbayev	Uzbekistan

The men's light welterweight (63.5 kilograms) event at the 2002 Asian Games took place from 2 to 13 October 2002 at Masan Gymnasium, Masan, South Korea.

== Schedule ==
All times are Korea Standard Time (UTC+09:00)

Date	Time	Event
Wednesday, 2 October 2002	14:00	Preliminary
Tuesday, 8 October 2002	14:00	Quarterfinals
Friday, 11 October 2002	14:00	Semifinals
Sunday, 13 October 2002	14:00	Final

== Results ==
Legend

- RET — Won by retirement
- RSCO — Won by referee stop contest outclassed
- WO — Won by walkover

Preliminary
Romeo Brin (PHI)	20
Bayarjargalyn Bayanmönkh (MGL)	16
Yukio Fukaishi (JPN)	17
Asghar Ali Shah (PAK)	19
Nurzhan Karimzhanov (KAZ)	16
Yu Shengdong (CHN)	14
Sayed Haroon Sadat (AFG)	11
Kumar Adhikari (NEP)	13
Bakhyt Sarsekbayev (UZB)	RET
Udone Khanxay (LAO)
Muzaffar Yusupbekov (KGZ)	RSC
Hoi Vai Tat (MAC)

Quarterfinals
Manus Boonjumnong (THA)	10
Shin Myung-hoon (KOR)	15
Romeo Brin (PHI)	15
Asghar Ali Shah (PAK)	31
Nurzhan Karimzhanov (KAZ)	WO
Kumar Adhikari (NEP)
Bakhyt Sarsekbayev (UZB)	RSCO
Muzaffar Yusupbekov (KGZ)

Semifinals
Shin Myung-hoon (KOR)	13
Asghar Ali Shah (PAK)	23
Nurzhan Karimzhanov (KAZ)	28
Bakhyt Sarsekbayev (UZB)	18

Final
Asghar Ali Shah (PAK)	15
Nurzhan Karimzhanov (KAZ)	19
