= Pedro Lima =

Pedro Lima may refer to:

- Pedro Lima (actor) (born 1971), former Olympic swimmer and now actor from Angola
- Pedro Lima (boxer) (born 1983), Brazilian boxer
- Pedro Lima (footballer, born 2003), Brazilian football midfielder
- Pedro Lima (footballer, born 2006), Brazilian football right-back
