= Ionuț Gheorghe =

Romanian boxer

Ionuţ Gheorghe
Personal information
- Full name: Ionuţ Gheorghe
- Nationality: Romania
- Born: February 29, 1984 (age 42) Constanţa
- Height: 1.73 m (5 ft 8 in)
- Weight: 64 kg (141 lb)

Sport
- Sport: Boxing
- Weight class: Light Welterweight
Medal record
Olympic Games
Bronze medal – third place	2004 Athens	Light Welterweight
European Amateur Championships
Bronze medal – third place	2006 Plovdiv	Light Welterweight
EU Amateur Championships
Silver medal – second place	2007 Dublin	Light Welterweight

Ionuţ Gheorghe (born 29 February 1984 in Constanţa, Romania) is a boxer from Romania.

== Career ==
He qualified for the 2004 Summer Olympics by ending up in first place at the 3rd AIBA European 2004 Olympic Qualifying Tournament in Gothenburg, Sweden. In Athens, Greece he won a bronze medal, having been stopped in the semifinals of the Light welterweight (64 kg) division by eventual winner Manus Boonjumnong.

Gheorghe won another bronze medal in the same division two years later, at the 2006 European Amateur Boxing Championships in Plovdiv where he lost to local Boris Georgiev.

At the 2007 World Championships he was upset by Iranian Morteza Sepahvand but he qualified for the Olympics at the first qualifier.

== Olympic results 2004 ==
- Defeated Faisal Karim (Pakistan) 26–11
- Defeated Mustafa Karagöllü (Turkey) 28–19
- Defeated Michele Di Rocco (Italy) 29–18
- Lost to Manus Boonjumnong (Thailand) 9-30
