= Boxing at the 2002 Asian Games – Men's 81 kg =

Boxing competitions

Men's 81 kg at the 2002 Asian Games
- Venue: Masan Gymnasium
- Date: 7–13 October 2002
- Competitors: 6 from 6 nations

Medalists
gold medal	Ikrom Berdiev	Uzbekistan
silver medal	Choi Ki-soo	South Korea
bronze medal	Munir Abukeshek	Palestine
bronze medal	Aleksey Katulevsky	Kyrgyzstan

The men's light heavyweight (81 kilograms) event at the 2002 Asian Games took place from 7 to 13 October 2002 at Masan Gymnasium, Masan, South Korea.

== Schedule ==
All times are Korea Standard Time (UTC+09:00)

Date	Time	Event
Monday, 7 October 2002	14:00	Quarterfinals
Friday, 11 October 2002	14:00	Semifinals
Sunday, 13 October 2002	14:00	Final

== Results ==
Legend

- RET — Won by retirement
- RSCO — Won by referee stop contest outclassed

Quarterfinals
Aleksey Katulevsky (KGZ)	RSCO
Na Risu (CHN)
Ikrom Berdiev (UZB)	RET
Olzhas Orazaliyev (KAZ)

Semifinals
Munir Abukeshek (PLE)
Choi Ki-soo (KOR)	RSCO
Aleksey Katulevsky (KGZ)
Ikrom Berdiev (UZB)	RSCO

Final
Choi Ki-soo (KOR)	19
Ikrom Berdiev (UZB)	25
