= Jonathan González Ortiz =

Puerto Rican boxer (born 1989)

Jonathan González
Personal information
- Nickname: Mantequilla
- Nationality: Puerto Rico
- Born: Jonathan González Ortiz; July 26, 1989 (age 36) San Juan, Puerto Rico
- Height: 5 ft 11 in (1.80 m)
- Weight: Welterweight; Super welterweight Middleweight; Super middleweight

Boxing career
- Stance: Orthodox

Boxing record
- Total fights: 22
- Wins: 20
- Win by KO: 16
- Losses: 1
- Draws: 1
- No contests: 0
Medal record
Representing Puerto Rico
Men’s boxing
Pan American Games
Silver medal – second place	2007 Rio de Janeiro	Light welterweight

Jonathan González Ortiz (born July 26, 1989) is a Puerto Rican professional boxer. As an amateur, he represented Puerto Rico at numerous international events. Gonzalez won a silver medal at the 2007 Pan American Games. He also competed at the 2008 Summer Olympics.

== Amateur career ==
At the 2007 Pan American Games, González defeated Inocente Fiss of Cuba in the semifinals; in the finals, he lost to Karl Dargan.

At the world championships 2007 he lost his first match to Australian Todd Kidd.

On July 8, 2008, Puerto Rico's Sports and Recreation Department offered up to $48,000 to the five boxers classified to the Olympics, if the boxers choose to continue in the team for a second Olympic cycle. Gonzalez noted that the offer was solid, noting his intention to stay if the quantity were met. As part of their training, the boxing team moved to South Korea to assimilate with the hourly changes. After training and participating in a series of exhibition matches, the team traveled from Korea to Beijing. In his first Olympic fight, González lost to Ionuţ Gheorghe of Romania by points, with scores of 21-4. After the event, he said that his performance wasn't "sufficiently aggressive" and that his opponent's speed "surprised" him because it wasn't seen in previous sparring fights between them. Upon closing his amateur career, González had compiled a record of 132-18.

== Professional career ==
After the Olympic Games, González announced his intention of abandoning the amateur circuit to pursue a professional contract. In December 2008, Seminole Warriors Boxing announced the signing of the pugilist, though part of his promotional rights were acquired by Universal Promotions. González debuted on January 14, 2009, defeating Alejandro Arteola by technical knockout in the third round. This was part of a boxing card organized by the promotion in Hollywood, Florida. The following month, he defeated Pascali Adorno by knockout.

On May 30, 2009, González defeated Laquel Fleming by technical knockout in the first round as part of the undercard of Andre Berto vs. Juan Urango. On July 31, 2009, he defeated Jorge Barajas by technical knockout in the first round. On August 28, 2009, González defeated Jason Thompson by technical knockout, fighting on the undercard of Juan Urango vs. Randall Bailey. The outcome was determined in the third round, when Thompson was unable to fully recover from a second knockdown, prompting the referee to stop the contest. In his next contest, he defeated Eduardo Adorno after Adorno retired in his corner between the first two rounds.

On March 19, 2010, González defeated Rodrigo Villareal by knockout in the third round. This marked the first time that he competed in a six-round contest. On June 4, 2010, González defeated former WBC Caribbean Boxing Federation (CABOFE) welterweight champion, Yoryi Estrella by technical knockout in three rounds. His next scheduled opponent was Abel Perry, in a fight that served as part of an ESPN2 undercard. González won the contest by technical knockout in the sixth round. Following this contest, Gary Shaw joined Universal and Warriors Boxing to co-promote his career.

On October 29, 2010, González competed in the co-main event of a card held in Guayama, Puerto Rico, defeating James LeBlanc by technical knockout in the first round. He won his last fight of the year over Gundrick King, when the referee stopped the contest in the second round. González won his first fight of 2011 over Chad Greenleaf in one round. On May 11, 2011, he defeated Rudy Cisneros by technical knockout in seven rounds, switching between technical and pressure styles throughout the fight, as well as fighting both the orthodox and southpaw stances.
