= Igor Alborov =

Uzbekistani boxer (born 1982)

Personal information
- Full name: Игорь Алборов
- Nationality: Uzbekistan
- Born: November 30, 1982 (age 43)
- Height: 1.83 m (6 ft 0 in)
- Weight: 91 kg (201 lb)

Sport
- Sport: Boxing
- Weight class: Heavyweight
Medal record
Asian Championships
Bronze medal – third place	2004 Puerto Princesa	Heavyweight

Igor Alborov (Игорь Алборов; born November 30, 1982) is a boxer from Uzbekistan, who participated in the 2004 Summer Olympics for his native Asian country. There he was stopped in the round of sixteen of the Heavyweight (91 kg) division by Egypt's eventual bronze medal winner Mohamed Elsayed.

Alborov qualified for the 2004 Athens Games by ending up in first place at the 1st AIBA Asian 2004 Olympic Qualifying Tournament in Guangzhou, China. In the decisive final match he defeated Kazakhstan's Pavel Storozhuk.
