= Mehrullah Lassi =

Pakistani boxer (born 1979)

Personal information
- Full name: Mehrullah Lassi
- Nationality: Pakistan
- Born: November 24, 1979 (age 46)
- Height: 1.62 m (5 ft 4 in)
- Weight: 54 kg (119 lb)

Sport
- Sport: Boxing
- Weight class: Featherweight
- Club: Karachi Port Trust Boxing Club
Medal record
Commonwealth Games
Silver medal – second place	2006 Melbourne	Featherweight
Asian Games
Gold medal – first place	2002 Busan	Featherweight
Asian Championships
Gold medal – first place	2005 Ho Chi Minh City	Featherweight

Mehrullah Lassi (born November 24, 1979, Karachi, Sindh) is a Pakistani former amateur boxer best known for winning a gold medal at the 2002 Asian Games. He represented Pakistan at the 2004 Summer Olympics and served as the country's flag-bearer in the closing ceremony.

== Career ==
Mehrullah Lassi joined the Karachi Port Trust boxing club in 1995. He won a gold medal at 2002 Asian Games in the featherweight division.

Lassi qualified for the Athens Games by placing first at the 1st AIBA Asian 2004 Olympic Qualifying Tournament in Guangzhou, China. In the final, he defeated China's Liu Yuan. At the Olympics, he tried his hand at a lower division, bantam category, but lost his first bout against superstar and two-time winner Guillermo Rigondeaux. After that, he reverted to fighting in the featherweight division. In 2005, he fought Olympic silver medalist Kim Song-Guk but the match ended in a draw.

In the 2006 Commonwealth Games, he lost in the final to Stephen Smith with the final score being 10:20. In his career's last years he used to spar on GEO TV's live broadcast match Ek Muka Aur ("One More Punch").

He and Faisal Karim were banned for life for failing the cannabis drugs test during the South Asian Games in Sri Lanka.
