= Sherzod Husanov =

Uzbekistani boxer (born 1980)

Personal information
- Full name: Шерзод Хусанов
- Nationality: Uzbekistan
- Born: 27 January 1980 (age 46)
- Height: 1.80 m (5 ft 11 in)
- Weight: 69 kg (152 lb)

Sport
- Sport: Boxing
- Weight class: Welterweight
Medal record
World Amateur Championships
Silver medal – second place	2003 Bangkok	Welterweight
Bronze medal – third place	2001 Belfast	Welterweight
Asian Games
Bronze medal – third place	2002 Busan	Welterweight
Asian Championships
Silver medal – second place	2004 Puerto Princesa	Welterweight
Bronze medal – third place	2002 Seremban	Welterweight

Sherzod Husanov (born 27 January 1980) is a boxer from Uzbekistan who won medals at the 2001 and 2003 World Amateur Boxing Championships and participated in the 2000 and 2004 Olympics.

== Amateurs ==
At the 2000 Summer Olympics, Husanov lost in his second bout, to eventual bronze medal winner Vitalie Gruşac of Moldova.

At both the 2001 World Amateur Boxing Championships and the 2003 World Amateur Boxing Championships in Bangkok, he lost to winner Lorenzo Aragon, winning bronze and silver, respectively, in the Welterweight division.

He qualified for the 2004 Olympics in Athens by winning the silver medal at the 2004 Asian Amateur Boxing Championships in Puerto Princesa, Philippines. In the final he was defeated by South Korea's Kim Jung-Joo. At the 2004 Summer Olympics he was beaten in the quarterfinals of the Welterweight (69 kg) division by Russia's two-time champion Oleg Saitov.

== Pro ==
Husanov turned pro at light middleweight at 2007 and won 17 bouts, one draw but showed little power. His draw was against another amateur star in Timur Nergadze whom he outpointed in the rematch.

== Professional boxing record ==
32 fights	25 wins	6 losses
By knockout	13	2
By decision	12	4
Draws	1	

No.	Result	Record	Opponent	Type	Round, time	Date	Location	Notes
32	Loss	25–6–1	(Kurdistan Region) Badien Hasso	UD	8	2025-11-23	(Albania) Olympic Park “Feti Borova”, Tirana	For vacant WBC International Silver light heavyweight title
31	Win	25–5–1	(Uzbekistan) Azamat Ergashev	KO	1 (10), 0:33	2025-01-19	(Uzbekistan) Akhmat Fight Arena, Tashkent	
30	Loss	24–5–1	(Russia) Artysh Lopsan	RTD	6 (10), 3:00	2024-11-16	(Russia) Yunost Sport Palace, Chelyabinsk	For vacant EBP super middleweight title
29	Loss	24–4–1	(Poland) Paweł Stępień	UD	8	2024-09-20	(Poland) Hala Widowiskowo-Sportowa, Chojnice	
28	Win	24–3–1	(Uzbekistan) Giyosbek Mamajonov	TKO	1 (8), 1:57	2024-05-29	(Uzbekistan) Olympic Arena, Andijan	
27	Win	23–3–1	(Uzbekistan) Odiljon Juraboev	TKO	2 (8), 1:05	2024-04-27	(Uzbekistan) Olympic Arena, Andijan	
26	Loss	22–3–1	(United Kingdom) Zach Parker	KO	1 (10), 2:47	2021-07-10	(United Kingdom) Royal Albert Hall, London	For WBO International super middleweight title
25	Loss	22–2–1	(Russia) Aslambek Idigov	UD	10	2021-04-08	(Russia) Grozny	For IBF and WBO International super middleweight titles
24	Win	22–1–1	(Poland) Robert Parzęczewski	TKO	2 (10), 2:59	2020-09-26	(Poland) Hala Sportowa, Częstochowa	
23	Loss	21–1–1	(Poland) Damian Jonak	UD	8	2018-09-21	(Poland) Hala Widowiskowo-Sportowa, Jastrzębie-Zdrój	
22	Win	21–0–1	(Uzbekistan) Otabek Ibragimov	RTD	1 (12), 3:00	2018-05-13	(Uzbekistan) Margilan	
21	Win	20–0–1	(Belarus) Kiryl Samadurau	UD	8	2017-09-30	(Russia) Sports Palace Quant, Troitsk	
20	Win	19–0–1	(Argentina) Carlos Adán Jerez	UD	12	2014-02-08	(Uzbekistan) Sports Palace, Tashkent	
19	Win	18–0–1	(Argentina) Amilcar Edgardo Funes Melian	TD	6 (10), 2:04	2013-11-04	(Russia) Basket Hall, Krasnodar	
18	Win	17–0–1	(Estonia) Pavel Semjonov	MD	8	2013-02-15	(Russia) Sports Palace Quant, Troitsk	
17	Win	16–0–1	(Russia) Maxim Chemezov	KO	3 (8), 2:32	2012-12-30	(Russia) Sports Palace Quant, Troitsk	
16	Win	15–0–1	(Colombia) Jhon Berrio	MD	10	2010-06-18	(United States) Northern Quest Resort & Casino, Airway Heights, Washington	
15	Win	14–0–1	(Russia) Timur Nergadze	UD	12	2009-10-03	(Russia) Russian State University of Physical Education, Sport, Youth and Tourism, Moscow	Won vacant WBC International super welterweight title
14	Draw	13–0–1	(Russia) Timur Nergadze	SD	12	2009-06-21	(Russia) Red Square, Moscow	Retained WBO Asia Pacific super welterweight title
13	Win	13–0	(Czech Republic) Patrik Hruska	UD	8	2009-04-26	(Portugal) Matosinhos Sports and Events Center, Senhora da Hora	
12	Win	12–0	(Russia) Artem Vychkin	KO	4 (6), 1:52	2009-03-12	(Russia) Vodoley, Yekaterinburg	
11	Win	11–0	(Thailand) Thawat Khamsom	KO	3 (12), 1:30	2008-07-31	(Russia) Pyramide, Kazan	Won vacant WBC Asian and WBO Asia Pacific super welterweight titles
10	Win	10–0	(Russia) Anton Dimidkin	KO	1 (6), 0:32	2008-05-29	(Russia) Forum, Nizhny Tagil	
9	Win	9–0	(Russia) Vadim Sufiyanov	TKO	5 (6), 1:19	2008-02-29	(Russia) Forum, Nizhny Tagil	
8	Win	8–0	(Russia) Rauf Garaev	UD	8	2007-11-30	(Russia) Forum, Nizhny Tagil	
7	Win	7–0	(Russia) Yan Khodyrev	KO	5 (6)	2007-10-25	(Russia) Vodoley, Yekaterinburg	
6	Win	6–0	(Russia) Evgeny Peshekhonov	UD	6	2007-09-27	(Russia) Vodoley, Yekaterinburg	
5	Win	5–0	(Russia) Alexander Valiakhmetov	TKO	4 (8)	2007-08-18	(Uzbekistan) Tennis Court, Bekobod	
4	Win	4–0	(Russia) Alexander Pestenkov	UD	8	2007-05-26	(Uzbekistan) Tennis Court, Bekobod	
3	Win	3–0	(Russia) Sergey Starkov	UD	6	2007-04-21	(Uzbekistan) Fergana	
2	Win	2–0	(Uzbekistan) Abdumalik Anvarov	TKO	3 (4)	2007-03-11	(Uzbekistan) Dinamo, Tashkent	
1	Win	1–0	(Uzbekistan) Fayzullo Akhmedov	UD	4	2007-01-06	(Uzbekistan) Tashkent	

== See also ==
- List of current WBC international champions
