= Carlos Banteux =

Cuban boxer (born 1986)

Carlos Banteur
Personal information
- Full name: Carlos Banteur Suárez
- Born: October 13, 1986 (age 39) Santiago de Cuba, Cuba
- Height: 1.74 m (5 ft 9 in)
- Weight: 69 kg (152 lb)

Sport
- Sport: Boxing
- Weight class: Welterweight
Medal record
Men's amateur boxing
Representing Cuba
Olympic Games
Silver medal – second place	2008 Beijing	Welterweight
World Cup
Silver medal – second place	2005 Moscow	Light Welterweight
Pan American Games
Gold medal – first place	2011 Guadalajara	Welterweight

Carlos Banteur Suárez (born October 13, 1986) is a Cuban amateur boxer from Santiago de Cuba best known for qualifying for the 2008 Olympics at welterweight. His name is sometimes misspelled Banteaux, Banteaur or Banteux by some sources outside Cuba.

== Career ==
Banteur won the 64 kg World Junior Championships 2004, but struggled at senior level for years at junior welter even nationally. His best result was a second place in 2006 vs Inocente Fiss, in 2007 he again exited early.

After the failed defection of dominant welterweight world champion Erislandy Lara, however, Lara was sidelined and the division was wide open. Banteur moved up and won the 2008 nationals immediately with a clear 15:6 final win over veteran Yudel Johnson.

He won the Dominican Copa Independencia and dominated his four bouts at the Olympic qualifier routing Óscar Molina 19:4 in the all-important semifinal. In the meaningless final he also beat fellow qualifier John Jackson 12:2.

At the Olympics Banteur defeated Hosam Abdin to reach the medal rounds.

=== Olympic Games ===
- 2008 in Beijing, China (light welterweight)
  - 1st round bye
  - Defeated Billy Joe Saunders (Great Britain) 13–6
  - Defeated Hosam Bakr Abdin (Egypt) 10–2
  - Defeated Kanat Islam (China) 17–4
  - Lost to Bakhyt Sarsekbayev (Kazakhstan) 18–9

=== World Cup ===
- 2005 in Moscow, Russia (light welterweight)
  - Lost to Kanat Orakbayev (Kazakhstan) 36–44
  - Lost to Oleg Komissarov (Russia) 25–30

== Amateur career highlights ==
Year	Tournament	Venue	Weight class	Result	Opponent	Score / Notes
2004	World Junior Championships	Jeju Island, South Korea	64 kg	1st place, gold medalist(s)	(Egypt) Ramadan Yasser	Won gold medal
2005	World Cup	Moscow, Russia	64 kg	2nd place, silver medalist(s)	(Russia) Oleg Komissarov	Team tournament; lost in finals
2008	Summer Olympic Games	Beijing, China	69 kg	2nd place, silver medalist(s)	(Kazakhstan) Bakhyt Sarsekbayev	Lost in gold medal match (4–18)
2008	Boxing World Cup	Moscow, Russia	69 kg	1st place, gold medalist(s)	(Moldova) Vasili Belous	Won gold medal
2011	Pan American Games	Guadalajara, Mexico	69 kg	1st place, gold medalist(s)	(Mexico) Óscar Molina	Won gold medal (20–13)
