= Boxing at the 2002 Asian Games – Men's 67 kg =

Boxing competitions

Men's 67 kg at the 2002 Asian Games
- Venue: Masan Gymnasium
- Date: 3–13 October 2002
- Competitors: 14 from 14 nations

Medalists
gold medal	Kim Jung-joo	South Korea
silver medal	Sergey Rychko	Kazakhstan
bronze medal	Manon Boonjumnong	Thailand
bronze medal	Sherzod Husanov	Uzbekistan

The men's welterweight (67 kilograms) event at the 2002 Asian Games took place from 3 to 13 October 2002 at Masan Gymnasium, Masan, South Korea.

== Schedule ==
All times are Korea Standard Time (UTC+09:00)

Date	Time	Event
Thursday, 3 October 2002	14:00	Preliminary
Wednesday, 9 October 2002	14:00	Quarterfinals
Saturday, 12 October 2002	14:00	Semifinals
Sunday, 13 October 2002	14:00	Final

== Results ==
Legend

- RSC — Won by referee stop contest
- RSCH — Won by referee stop contest head blow
- RSCO — Won by referee stop contest outclassed
- WO — Won by walkover

Preliminary
Daiviin Otgonbayar (MGL)	RSCH
Arjun Kumar Tamang (NEP)
Manon Boonjumnong (THA)	RSCH
Ath Samreth (CAM)
Sherzod Husanov (UZB)	RSC
Nawaf Mohammed (QAT)
Saad Al-Hajraf (KUW)	23
Suruj Bangali (BAN)	21
Naoki Hirata (JPN)	23
Aibek Djenbekov (KGZ)	24
Sadeq Naqshbande (AFG)
Sergey Rychko (KAZ)	RSC

Quarterfinals
Kim Jung-joo (KOR)	RSCO
Sanjay Kumar (IND)
Daiviin Otgonbayar (MGL)	6
Manon Boonjumnong (THA)	25
Sherzod Husanov (UZB)	WO
Saad Al-Hajraf (KUW)
Aibek Djenbekov (KGZ)	30
Sergey Rychko (KAZ)	38

Semifinals
Kim Jung-joo (KOR)	28
Manon Boonjumnong (THA)	13
Sherzod Husanov (UZB)	33
Sergey Rychko (KAZ)	34

Final
Kim Jung-joo (KOR)	31
Sergey Rychko (KAZ)	30
