= Kim Jung-joo =

South Korean boxer (born 1981)

Medal record

Men's Boxing

Representing South Korea

Olympic Games
Bronze medal – third place	2004 Athens	Welterweight
Bronze medal – third place	2008 Beijing	Welterweight

Asian Games
Gold medal – first place	2002 Busan	Welterweight

Asian Amateur Championships
Gold medal – first place	2004 Puerto Princesa	Welterweight

- Kim Jung-joo
- Hangul: 김정주
- Hanja: 金貞柱
- RR: Gim Jeongju
- MR: Kim Chŏngju

Kim Jung-joo (Korean: 김정주; Hanja: 金貞柱; born November 11, 1981, in Jinju, South Gyeongsang Province, South Korea) is a South Korean amateur boxer who won welterweight bronze medals at the 2004 Summer Olympics and 2008 Summer Olympics.

Kim received a Master's degree in physical education from Sangji University in South Korea.

== Career ==
He won a gold medal in welterweight at the 2002 Asian Games, beating Non Boonjumnong in the semifinals. Kim qualified for the Athens Games by winning the gold medal at the 2004 Asian Amateur Boxing Championships in Puerto Princesa, Philippines. In the final he defeated Uzbekistan's Sherzod Husanov.

He did not compete at the 2005 and 2007 world championships and was beaten in the first round at the 2006 Asian Games by Angkhan Chomphuphuang. He easily qualified for the 2008 Summer Olympics, though, by beating Davran Khabirov and Dilshod Mahmudov.

== Results ==
2003 World Championships

Event	Round	Result	Opponent	Score
Welterweight	First	bye		
Welterweight	Second	Win	(Finland) Jari Fyhr	25-11
Welterweight	Third	Loss	(Kazakhstan) Bakhtiyar Artayev	10-29

2004 Summer Olympics

Event	Round	Result	Opponent	Score
Welterweight	First	bye		
Welterweight	Second	Win	(Moldova) Vitalie Gruşac	23-20
Welterweight	Quarterfinal	Win	(Colombia) Juan Camilo Novoa	25-23
Welterweight	Semifinal	Loss	(Cuba) Lorenzo Aragon	10-38

2008 Summer Olympics

Event	Round	Result	Opponent	Score
Welterweight	First	Win	(Germany) Jack Culcay-Keth	11(+)-11
Welterweight	Second	Win	(United States Virgin Islands) John Jackson	10-0
Welterweight	Quarterfinal	Win	(United States) Demetrius Andrade	11-9
Welterweight	Semifinal	Loss	(Kazakhstan) Bakhyt Sarsekbayev	6-10
