= Asghar Ali Shah (boxer) =

Pakistani boxer (born 1978)

Personal information
- Full name: Syed Asghar Ali Shah
- Born: 3 October 1978 (age 47) Hyderabad, Pakistan

Sport
- Sport: Boxing
- Weight class: Lightweight, Light welterweight
Medal record
Men's boxing
Representing Pakistan
Asian Games
Silver medal – second place	2002 Busan	Light welterweight
Asian Championships
Gold medal – first place	2005 Ho Chi Minh	Light welterweight
Silver medal – second place	2004 Puerto Princesa	Lightweight
Bronze medal – third place	2002 Seremban	Light welterweight

Syed Asghar Ali Shah (born 3 October 1978), also known as Asghar Ali Shah, is a Pakistani former boxer. He represented Pakistan at the 2000 and 2004 Summer Olympics.

He won a silver medal in the 63.5 kg event at the 2002 Asian Games.
