= Nasserredine Fillali =

Algerian boxer (born 1984)

Medal record

Representing Algeria

Men's Boxing

All-Africa Games
Silver medal – second place	2003 Abuja	Light Welterweight

Nasserredine Fillali (born January 18, 1984) is a boxer from Algeria.

He participated in the 2004 Summer Olympics for his native North African country. There he was stopped in the second round of the Light welterweight (64 kg) division by Bulgaria's eventual bronze medalist Boris Georgiev.

Fillali won the silver medal in the same division one year earlier, at the All-Africa Games in Abuja, Nigeria.
