= Liu Yuan (boxer) =

Chinese boxer (born 1979)

Personal information
- Full name: 劉 淵
- Nationality: China
- Born: March 11, 1979 (age 47) Guizhou
- Height: 1.74 m (5 ft 8 1/2 in)
- Weight: 54 kg (119 lb)

Sport
- Sport: Boxing
- Weight class: Bantamweight

Liu Yuan (born March 11, 1979) is a Chinese amateur boxer. He qualified to compete at the 2004 Summer Olympics in the bantamweight division (– 54 kg) where he lost in the first round to Cuba's eventual gold medalist Guillermo Rigondeaux. Liu qualified for the 2004 Athens Games as a bantamweight by ending up in second place at the 1st AIBA Asian 2004 Olympic Qualifying Tournament in Guangzhou, PR China. In the final he lost to Pakistan's Mehrullah Lassi.
