= Damian Jonak =

Polish boxer (born 1983)

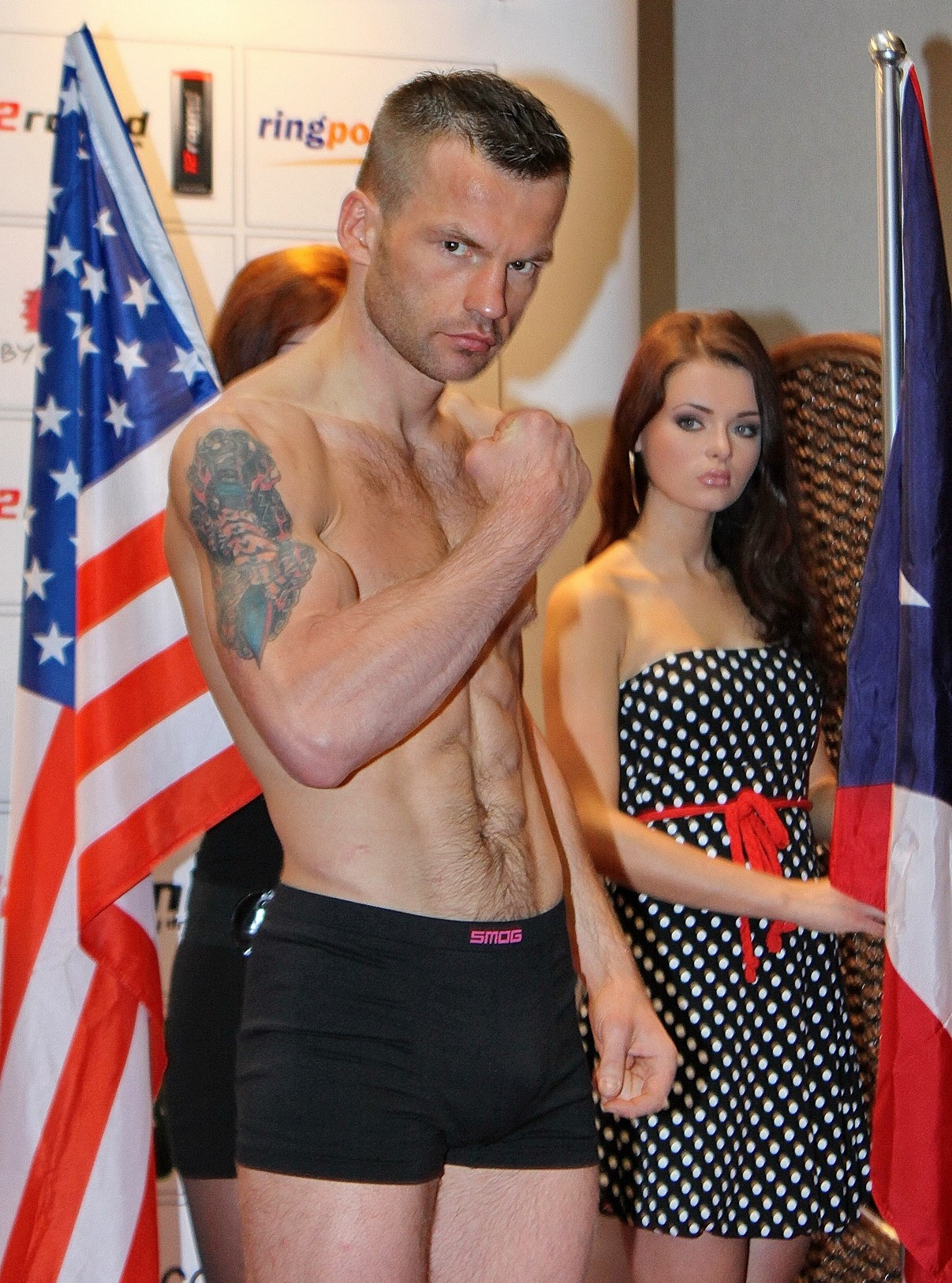

Personal information
- Nickname: The Beast
- Nationality: (Poland) Polish
- Born: Damian Jonak; April 24, 1983 (age 43) Włoszczowa
- Height: 5 ft 9 in (1.75 m)
- Weight: Light Middleweight

Boxing career
- Stance: Orthodox

Boxing record
- Total fights: 43
- Wins: 41
- Win by KO: 21
- Losses: 1
- Draws: 1
- No contests: 0

Damian Jonak (born 24 April 1983, Włoszczowa, Poland) is a Polish professional boxer, fighting in the Light Middleweight division.

== Amateur boxing ==
After a year of judo, at age 10 he began training in boxing in Bytom under the supervision of Marian Łagocki and Mark Okroskowicza, who is now the first coach of the junior team and an assistant first team coach seniors. The seniors coached in the BCS Imex Hawks led by Zbigniew kick and Fyodor Lapin and rollers Zabrze under the wings of Christopher snuff.

He fought 168 amateur fights, of which 153 won twice won the Polish championship cadets and juniors. Then twice was a youth champion Polish super welterweight. His biggest success in the ring is an amateur winning the bronze medal in the Junior European Championships in the 67 kg category. Most wins fighting ended ahead of time.

== Professional record ==
40 fights, 39 wins (21 knockouts), ,0 losses (0 knockouts), 1 draw
Result	Record	Opponent	Type	Round, time	Date	Location	Notes
Win	43-1-2	(Argentina) Nestor David Campos	KO	3 (8), 0:37	2022-11-18	(Poland) Grupa Azoty Arena, Puławy	
Win	42-1-2	(United Kingdom) Andrew Robinson	UD	8	2022-04-22	(Poland) Hala na Skarpie, Bytom	
Draw	41-1-2	(United Kingdom) Andrew Robinson	MD	8	2021-11-26	(Poland) Miejska Hala Sportowa, Radomsko	
Loss	41-1-1	(United Kingdom) Andrew Robinson	SD	8	2019-04-06	(Poland) Spodek, Katowice	
Win	41-0-1	(Uzbekistan) Sherzod Husanov	UD	8	2018-09-21	(Poland) Hala Widowiskowo-Sportowa Jastrzębie-Zdrój	
Win	40-0-1	(Argentina) Marcos Jesus Cornejo	UD	8	2018-04-21	(Poland) Hala Sportowa, Częstochowa	
Win	39-0-1	(Tunisia) Ayoub Nefzi	UD	10	2015-05-16	(Poland) Hall, Inowrocław	
Win	38-0-1	(United Kingdom) Bradley Pryce	UD	8	2014-12-12	(Poland) MOSiR Hall, Radom	
Win	37-0-1	(United Kingdom) Kris Carslaw	UD	10	2013-11-23	(Poland) Hala Widowiskowo-Sportowa, Jastrzębie-Zdrój	
Win	36-0-1	(Jamaica) Max Maxwell	UD	8	2013-03-23	(Poland) Hala Sportowa, Częstochowa	
Win	35-0-1	(Belgium) Jackson Osei Bonsu	UD	10	2012-12-08	(Poland) Spodek, Katowice	
Win	34-0-1	(Hungary) Laszlo Fazekas	UD	6	2012-09-22	(Poland) Hala Stulecia, Wrocław	
Win	33-0-1	(Brazil) Anderson Clayton	UD	10	2012-04-21	(Poland) MOSiR Hall, Zabrze	
Win	32-0-1	(Poland) Sebastian Skrzypczynski	TKO	8 (8), 1:18	2012-02-18	(Poland) Hala RAFAKO, Racibórz	
Win	31-0-1	(Democratic Republic of the Congo) Alex Bunema	UD	10	2011-10-15	(Poland) Spodek, Katowice	Won WBC Baltic and WBA International Super welterweight title.
Win	30-0-1	(Senegal) Mamadou Thiam	KO	1 (8), 1:27	2011-06-25	(Poland) Hala na Podpromiu, Rzeszów	
Win	29-0-1	(Russia) Albert Starikov	UD	8	2011-04-02	(Poland) Hala Łuczniczka, Bydgoszcz	
Win	28-0-1	(Mexico) Jose Luis Cruz	UD	10	2010-10-16	(Poland) Arena Hall, Legionowo	Won vacant WBC Baltic Super welterweight title.
Win	27-0-1	(Germany) Turgay Uzun	TKO	1 (8), 0:54	2010-05-15	(Poland) Atlas Arena, Łódź	
Win	26-0-1	(Romania) Ionut Trandafir Ilie	UD	8	2010-04-24	(Poland) Hala Sportowa, Gdynia	
Win	25-0-1	(Germany) Mazen Girke	TKO	4 (6)	2010-02-07	(Germany) Altes Funkwerk, Koepenick, Berlin	
Win	24-0-1	(France) Nicolas Guisset	UD	8	2009-12-19	(Germany) Sport and Congress Center, Schwerin, Mecklenburg-Vorpommern	
Draw	24-0-1	(Poland) Mariusz Cendrowski	PTS	8	2009-10-24	(Poland) Atlas Arena, Łódź	
Win	24-0	(France) Sylvestre Marianini	UD	6	2009-10-10	(Germany) Stadthalle, Rostock, Mecklenburg-Vorpommern	
Win	23-0	(Morocco) Tarik Sahibeddine	TKO	5 (8), 0:55	2009-06-20	(Poland) Targowisko Miejskie, Ruda Śląska	
Win	22-0	(Cape Verde) Domingos Monteiro	TKO	6 (10), 0:40	2009-05-09	(Poland) Hala Sportowa, Gdynia	Won IBC Super welterweight title.
Win	21-0	(Hungary) Janos Petrovics	TKO	4 (6), 2:23	2009-02-28	(Poland) Hall, Lublin	
Win	20-0	(Finland) Mika Joensuu	TKO	4 (10), 1:23	2008-10-18	(Poland) MOSiR Hall, Zabrze	Won WBC Youth World and vacant Baltic Super welterweight title.
Win	19-0	(France) Louis Mimoune	TKO	3 (8), 2:46	2008-05-31	(Poland) Hala Widowiskowo - Sportowa, Legnica	
Win	18-0	(France) Sebastien Spengler	TKO	4 (10), 0:32	2008-04-19	(Poland) Spodek, Katowice	Retained WBC Youth World Super welterweight title.
Win	17-0	(Georgia (country)) Alexander Benidze	UD	6	2008-02-09	(Poland) Hala Globus, Lublin	
Win	16-0	(Romania) Rafael Chiruta	TKO	6 (6), 1:33	2007-10-20	(Poland) Expo Center, Warsaw	
Win	15-0	(Georgia (country)) Koba Karkashadze	RTD	8 (10), 3:00	2007-09-22	(Poland) Stara Hala Elektrowni Szombierki, Bytom	Retained WBC Youth World Super welterweight title.
Win	14-0	(Russia) Michael Schubov	UD	10	2007-05-26	(Poland) Spodek, Katowice	Won WBC Youth World Super welterweight title.
Win	13-0	(Latvia) Janis Cernauskis	UD	6	2007-03-03	(Germany) Stadthalle, Rostock, Mecklenburg-Vorpommern	
Win	12-0	(Nigeria) Samson Oludayo	KO	3 (8), 3:00	2007-02-24	(Poland) Gminny Osrodek Sportu, Głogów	
Win	11-0	(Czech Republic) Vladimir Fecko	KO	1 (4), 0:53	2006-11-25	(Poland) Torwar Sport Hall, Warsaw	
Win	10-0	(Slovakia) Patrik Prokopecz	TKO	1 (4)	2006-11-18	(Austria) Sporthalle, Steyr	
