= Nauman Karim =

Pakistani boxer

Nouman Karim
Personal information
- Full name: Nouman Karim
- Nationality: Pakistan

Sport
- Sport: Boxing
- Weight class: Flyweight
Medal record
Asian Games
| Silver medal – second place | 2002 Busan | Flyweight |
Pakistan Championships
| Bronze medal – third place | 2003 Bangkok | Light Flyweight |
Asian Championships
| Silver medal – second place | 2005 Ho Chi Minh City | Flyweight |
| Gold medal – first place | 2004 Puerto Princesa | Light Flyweight |

Nauman Karim is a boxer from Pakistan.

He won the bronze medal in the light flyweight (– 48 kg) division at the 2003 World Amateur Boxing Championships in Bangkok. He also competed at the 2005 World Amateur Boxing Championships, but was stopped in the third round.

He won a silver medal at the 2002 Asian Games as well as at the 2005 Asian Championships.
