= Ikrom Berdiev =

Uzbekistani boxer (born 1974)

Personal information
- Born: June 23, 1974 (age 52) Chirchiq, Uzbekistan
- Height: 183 cm (6 ft 0 in)

Sport
- Sport: Boxing
- Weight class: Light heavyweight
Medal record
Men's boxing
Representing Uzbekistan
Asian Games
Gold medal – first place	2002 Busan	Light heavyweight
Asian Championships
Gold medal – first place	2002 Seremban	Light heavyweight

Ikrom Berdiev (born June 23, 1974) is an Uzbekistani boxer best known to win the gold medal at the 2002 Asian Games in the light-heavyweight division.

Former middleweight world champion Utkirbek Haydarov who had won the middleweight title at the Asian Games moved up to light-heavy and competed for Uzbekistan at the 2004 Summer Olympics, therefore Berdiev didn't participate in Athens, Greece.
