= Bakhyt Sarsekbayev =

Kazakh boxer (born 1981)

Bakhyt Sar
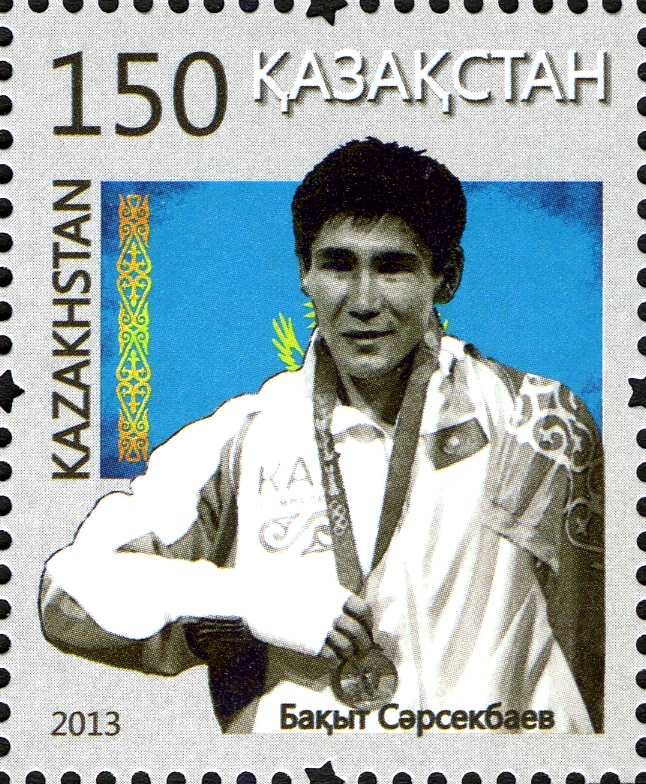
- Sarsekbayev depicted on a stamp from Kazakhstan

Personal information
- Full name: Бақыт Әбдірахманұлы Сәрсекбаев
- Nationality: Kazakhstan
- Born: 29 November 1981 (age 44) Pavlodar, Kazakh SSR, Soviet Union
- Height: 1.73 m (5 ft 8 in)
- Weight: 69 kg (152 lb)

Sport
- Sport: Boxing
- Weight class: Light welterweight, Welterweight
Medal record
Olympic Games
Gold medal – first place	2008 Beijing	Welterweight
Asian Games
Gold medal – first place	2006 Doha	Light welterweight
Bronze medal – third place	2002 Busan	Light welterweight
Asian Championships
Gold medal – first place	2002 Seremban	Light welterweight
Gold medal – first place	2005 Ho Chi Minh City	Welterweight
Gold medal – first place	2007 Ulan Bator	Welterweight
World University Championships
Gold medal – first place	2006 Almaty	Welterweight

Bakhyt Abdirakhmanuly Sarsekbayev (Kazakh: Бақыт Әбдірахманұлы Сәрсекбаев; born 29 November 1981) is a Kazakh amateur boxer who won gold at the 2008 Summer Olympics at Welterweight, and won gold medal at the 2006 Asian Games at Welterweight, and won bronze at the 2002 Asian Games at Light Welterweight.

== Career ==
The southpaw holds two wins over Cuban fellow southpaw and 2005 world champion Erislandy Lara. He won bronze at the 2002 Asian Games.

He won gold at the 2006 World University Championships, and won gold at the 2006 Asian Games defeating Chinese Kanat Islam.

At the 2007 World Championships, he beat Xavier Noël and PanAm champ Pedro Lima but was upset by Kanat Islam.

At the 2008 Summer Olympics, he defeated Cuban Carlos Banteaux Suarez in the finals to win a gold medal.

=== Olympic Games results ===
2008 (as a welterweight)

- Defeated Adam Trupish (Canada) 20–1
- Defeated Vitaly Gruşac (Moldova) RSC 2 (1:18)
- Defeated Dilshod Mahmudov (Uzbekistan) 12–7
- Defeated Kim Jung-Joo (South Korea) 10–6
- Defeated Carlos Banteaux(Cuba) 18–9

=== World Amateur Championship results ===
2007 (as a welterweight)

- Defeated Xavier Noel (France) 18–7
- Defeated Velidor Vidic (Bosnia) 26–4
- Defeated Pedro Lima (Brazil) 23–11
- Lost to Kanat Islam (China) 14–20
