= 2004 Asian Amateur Boxing Championships =

Boxing competitions

2004 Asian Boxing Championships
- Host city: Puerto Princesa, Philippines
- Dates: 11–18 January 2004
- Main venue: Puerto Princesa Coliseum

The 22nd edition of the Men's Asian Amateur Boxing Championships were held from January 11 to January 18, 2004 in Puerto Princesa Coliseum, Puerto Princesa, Philippines. The tournament served as a qualification event for the 2004 Summer Olympics in Athens.

In the light flyweight, flyweight, bantamweight and featherweight divisions, the top three performers gained Olympic qualification. From lightweight to light-heavy weight, the top two boxers qualified while only the winners of the heavyweight and super heavyweight divisions progressed to the Olympics.

== Medal summary ==
Event	Gold	Silver	Bronze
Light flyweight 48 kg	Nauman Karim; Pakistan	Zou Shiming; China	Kwak Hyok-ju; North Korea
Light flyweight 48 kg	Nauman Karim; Pakistan	Zou Shiming; China	Otabek Mamadjanov; Uzbekistan
Flyweight; 51 kg	Violito Payla; Philippines	Kim Ki-suk; South Korea	Somjit Jongjohor; Thailand
Flyweight; 51 kg	Violito Payla; Philippines	Kim Ki-suk; South Korea	Tulashboy Doniyorov; Uzbekistan
Bantamweight; 54 kg	Bahodirjon Sultonov; Uzbekistan	Aybek Abdymomunov; Kyrgyzstan	Kim Won-il; South Korea
Bantamweight; 54 kg	Bahodirjon Sultonov; Uzbekistan	Aybek Abdymomunov; Kyrgyzstan	Almaz Assanov; Kazakhstan
Featherweight; 57 kg	Galib Jafarov; Kazakhstan	Jo Seok-hwan; South Korea	Bekzod Khidirov; Uzbekistan
Featherweight; 57 kg	Galib Jafarov; Kazakhstan	Jo Seok-hwan; South Korea	Sodgereliin Battör; Mongolia
Lightweight; 60 kg	Baik Jong-sub; South Korea	Asghar Ali Shah; Pakistan	Kanat Orakbayev; Kazakhstan
Lightweight; 60 kg	Baik Jong-sub; South Korea	Asghar Ali Shah; Pakistan	Pichai Sayotha; Thailand
Light welterweight 64 kg	Romeo Brin; Philippines	Dilshod Mahmudov; Uzbekistan	Ralik Pashev; Kyrgyzstan
Light welterweight 64 kg	Romeo Brin; Philippines	Dilshod Mahmudov; Uzbekistan	Reza Ghasemi; Iran
Welterweight; 69 kg	Kim Jung-joo; South Korea	Sherzod Husanov; Uzbekistan	Naoki Hirata; Japan
Welterweight; 69 kg	Kim Jung-joo; South Korea	Sherzod Husanov; Uzbekistan	Basharmal Sultani; Afghanistan
Middleweight; 75 kg	Gennady Golovkin; Kazakhstan	Christopher Camat; Philippines	Koji Sato; Japan
Middleweight; 75 kg	Gennady Golovkin; Kazakhstan	Christopher Camat; Philippines	Kymbatbek Ryskulov; Kyrgyzstan
Light heavyweight 81 kg	Beibut Shumenov; Kazakhstan	Lei Yuping; China	Taher Jabbari; Iran
Light heavyweight 81 kg	Beibut Shumenov; Kazakhstan	Lei Yuping; China	Nodir Gulanov; Uzbekistan
Heavyweight; 91 kg	Nasser Al-Shami; Syria	Pavel Storozhuk; Kazakhstan	Igor Alborov; Uzbekistan
Heavyweight; 91 kg	Nasser Al-Shami; Syria	Pavel Storozhuk; Kazakhstan	Ali Mazaheri; Iran
Super heavyweight +91 kg	Rustam Saidov; Uzbekistan	Sergei Kharitonov; Tajikistan	Zhang Zhilei; China
Super heavyweight +91 kg	Rustam Saidov; Uzbekistan	Sergei Kharitonov; Tajikistan	Mukhtarkhan Dildabekov; Kazakhstan

== Medal table ==
Rank	Nation	Gold	Silver	Bronze	Total
1	Kazakhstan	3	1	3	7
2	Uzbekistan	2	2	5	9
3	South Korea	2	2	1	5
4	Philippines	2	1	0	3
5	Pakistan	1	1	0	2
6	Syria	1	0	0	1
7	China	0	2	1	3
8	Kyrgyzstan	0	1	2	3
9	Tajikistan	0	1	0	1
10	Iran	0	0	3	3
11	Japan	0	0	2	2
11	Thailand	0	0	2	2
13	Afghanistan	0	0	1	1
13	Mongolia	0	0	1	1
13	North Korea	0	0	1	1
Totals (15 entries)		11	11	22	44

== See also ==
- 1st AIBA Asian 2004 Olympic Qualifying Tournament
- 2nd AIBA Asian 2004 Olympic Qualifying Tournament
