= Yudel Johnson =

Cuban boxer

Yudel Jhonson
Personal information
- Nationality: (Cuba) Cuban
- Born: Yudel Jhonson Cedeno; 6 June 1981 (age 45) Cuba
- Weight: Light Middleweight

Boxing career
- Stance: Southpaw

Boxing record
- Total fights: 20
- Wins: 17
- Win by KO: 9
- Losses: 3
- Draws: 0
- No contests: 0
Medal record
Representing Cuba
Olympic Games
Silver medal – second place	2004 Athens	Light-Welterweight
Pan American Games
Gold medal – first place	1999 Winnipeg	Featherweight
Central American and Caribbean Games
Gold medal – first place	2006 Cartagena	Light Welterweight
Goodwill Games
Gold medal – first place	2001 Brisbane	Welterweight

Yudel Johnson Cedeno (born 6 June 1981) is a Cuban welterweight professional boxer, who is best known for winning an Olympic Light-Welterweight silver 2004 as an amateur. Some sources write the family name Jhonson.

== Amateur career ==
Southpaw Johnson won the gold medal in the men's featherweight division at the 1999 Pan American Games. He moved up afterwards but skipped lightweight as the dominant Mario Kindelán was the Cuban champ.

Johnson added a silver at the 2004 Summer Olympics in the Light-Welterweight Boxing division Dilshod Mahmudov and Boris Georgiev but lost to Manus Boonjumnong in the final. He qualified for the Olympic Games by ending up in first place at the 2nd AIBA American 2004 Olympic Qualifying Tournament in Rio de Janeiro, Brazil. Before the Athens Games, he won the 2004 Acropolis Boxing Cup in Athens, Greece by defeating Turkey's Mustafa Karagollu in the final of the light welterweight division.

Johnson also won at the 2006 Central American Games but had strong domestic competition in Inocente Fiss. In 2008 he fought at welter losing to Carlos Banteaux in the final of the national championships.

=== Olympic results ===
- Received a bye in the 1st round
- Defeated Davis Mwale (Zambia) RSC-3 (1:49)
- Defeated Dilshod Mahmudov (Uzbekistan) 32–18
- Defeated Boris Georgiev (Bulgaria) 13–9
- Lost to Manus Boonjumnong (Thailand) 11–17

== Professional career ==
Johnson defected along with Guillermo Rigondeaux and Yordanis Despaigne to the United States and made his pro debut on May 22, 2009, in Miami. As of September 2011 he is undefeated with 11 wins, 7 of which were by way of knockout.

== Professional boxing record ==
12 Wins (8 Knockouts), 0 Defeats, 0 Draws
Res.	Record	Opponent	Type	Rd., Time	Date	Location	Notes
Win	16–1	(Mexico) Norberto Gonzalez	UD	10	2014-06-06	(United States) Turning Stone Resort & Casino, Verona, New York, USA	Won vacant WBC FECARBOX Light Middleweight title and vacant NABA Light Middleweight title
Win	15–1	(United States) Lenwood Dozier	UD	8	2013-04-18	(United States) Convention Center, Monroeville, Pennsylvania, USA	
Win	14–1	(Ecuador) Humberto Toledo	KO	1 0:48	2013-04-05	UTESA, Santiago de los Caballeros, Dominican Republic	
Win	13–1	(United States) Dashon Johnson	UD	1O	2013-01-12	(United States) BB&t Center, Sunrise, Florida, USA	
Lose	12–1	(United States) Willie Nelson	UD	1O	2012-05-11	(United States) Texas Station Casino, Las Vegas, Nevada, USA	
Win	12–0	(Dominican Republic) Eduardo Mercedes	TKO	3 (8), 1:00	2011-10-15	(Dominican Republic) Coliseo Carlos 'Teo' Cruz, Santo Dominigo	
Win	11–0	(Colombia) Jose Miguel Torres	UD	10	2011-06-03	(United States) A La Carte Event Pavilion, Tampa, Florida	Retained WBC FECARBOX Light Middleweight title
Win	10–0	(Colombia) Richard Gutierrez	TKO	7 (10), 1:09	2011-03-25	(United States) Cosmopolitan Resort Casino, Las Vegas, Nevada	Won vacant WBC FECARBOX Light Middleweight title
Win	9–0	(Dominican Republic) Joseph De los Santos	UD	6	2010-12-03	(United States) Magic City Casino, Miami, Florida	
Win	8–0	(United States) Steve Verdin	TKO	1 (6), 1:51	2010-09-24	(United States) Paragon Casino, Marksville, Louisiana	
Win	7–0	(Brazil) Juliano Ramos	TKO	8 (10), 2:40	2010-06-04	(United States) FIU Fuchs Pavilion, Miami, Florida	
Win	6–0	(United States) Chris Grays	KO	1 (6), 2:04	2010-04-10	(United States) BankAtlantic Center, Sunrise, Florida	
Win	5–0	(Dominica) Dorian Beaupierre	TKO	1 (6), 2:18	2010-02-05	(United States) NSU Arena, Don Taft University Center, Fort Lauderdale, Florida	
Win	4–0	(United States) Louie Leija	KO	1 (8), 0:28	2009-12-04	(United States) La Covacha, Miami, Florida	
Win	3–0	(Puerto Rico) Frankie Santos	UD	8	2009-09-18	(United States) Fontainebleau Hotel, Miami Beach, Florida	
Win	2–0	(United States) Justin Paulo	UD	4	2009-07-17	(United States) Planet Hollywood Resort and Casino, Las Vegas, Nevada	
Win	1–0	(United States) Greg Weathers	TKO	1 (4), 0:52	2009-05-22	(United States) Fontainebleau Hotel, Miami Beach, Florida	Professional Debut
