= Nurzhan Karimzhanov =

Kazakhstani boxer (born 1980)

Personal information
- Born: 30 May 1980 (age 46)

Sport
- Sport: Boxing
- Weight class: Light welterweight
Medal record
Men's boxing
Representing Kazakhstan
Asian Games
| Gold medal – first place | 2002 Busan | Light welterweight |

Nurzhan Karimzhanov (born 30 May 1980) is a Kazakhstani boxer, who won the gold medal at the 2002 Asian Games in the Junior Welterweight division.

== Career ==
At the Olympics 2000 he fought at lightweight and beat among others local hero Michael Katsidis but lost to Andriy Kotelnyk. At the Asian Games he won the junior welterweight title.

Karimzhanov qualified for the Athens Games by ending up in second place at the 1st AIBA Asian 2004 Olympic Qualifying Tournament in Guangzhou, PR China. In the final he lost to Thailand's eventual gold medalist Manus Boonjumnong. At the Olympics 2004 he beat two opponents, but lost to Boris Georgiev 18:20.
