= Alireza Esteki =

Boxing trainer

- علیرضا استکی
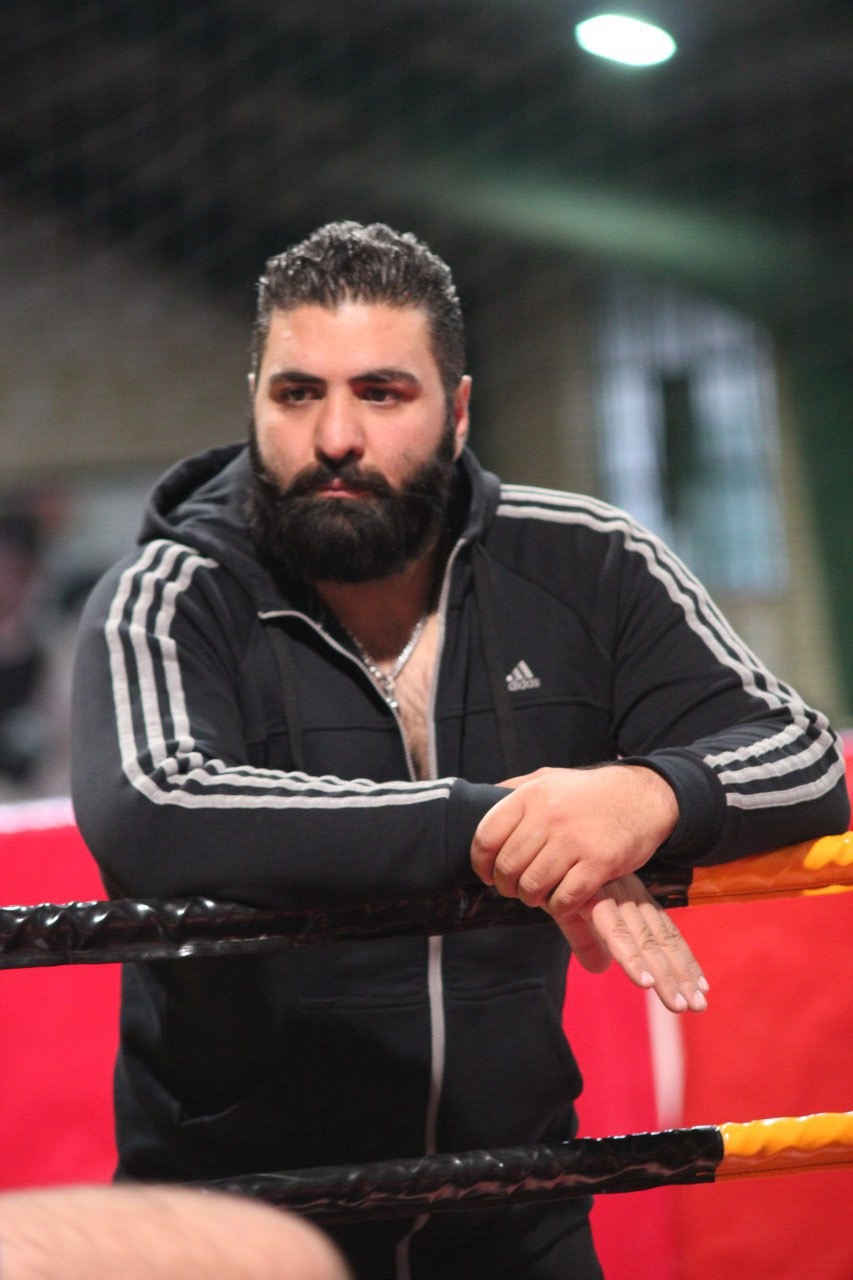
- Born: September 21, 1975 (age 50); Isfahan
- Occupation: Coach
- Years active: 1998-now
- Known for: Head coach of Iran's national boxing team
- Height: 1.96 m (6 ft 5 in)
- Children: Sam Esteki
- Parents: Reza Esteki (father); Moloukeh Ali Rad (mother)
- Honours: Win 2 gold medals, 4 silver medals and 1 bronze medal; Asian silver medalist from Malaysia in 2002

Alireza Esteki (born September 21, 1975, in Isfahan), one of the champions and coaches of boxing and bodybuilding, is the coach of the Iranian national boxing team.

== Start of activity ==
He entered boxing in 1993 when he was 16 years old due to his weight and encouragement from his father. His perseverance and interest caused him to participate in national competitions in 1372 and a year later he won the title of the third place in the national championship in Damghan.

He joined the national boxing team from 1998 to 2005, and although the national team did not send many players to competitions, it also has a second Asian medal in Malaysia.

== Coaching ==
Alireza Esteki has spent part of his coaching career in Kazakhstan, and coached former wrestling champion Amir Ali Akbari, preparing him for the World Boxing Championships.

== Education ==
Master of Strategic Physical Education Management

== Coaching qualifications ==
- Bodybuilding coaching from the National Olympic Committee
- Professional boxing coaching certificate from the UK
- 1-star and 2-star international certification from IBA (World Boxing Federation)

== Honors ==
- Win 2 gold medals, 4 silver medals and 1 bronze medal.
- Asian silver medalist from Malaysia in 2002.

== Resume ==
- 14 years of coaching and head coaching in Iranian national boxing teams
- 7 years of bodybuilding, technical coach of the adult national team
- 1 year as the head coach of the national youth team in 2014
- 1 year head coach of Omid national team
- 1 year head coach of Iran's national boxing team (adults)
- 8 years member of the technical committee of the Boxing Federation

== See also ==
- Danial Shahbakhsh

== Press coverage ==
- Tasnim
- Isna
- Irna
- Jame Jam
- Fars News
- Mehr News
- Mashregh News
