= Mustafa Karagöllü =

Turkish boxer (born 1981)

Personal information
- Nationality: Turkish
- Born: April 26, 1981 (age 45) Ankara, Turkey
- Height: 1.83 m (6 ft 0 in)
- Weight: 64 kg (141 lb)

Sport
- Sport: Boxing
- Weight class: Light Welterweight
Medal record
Representing Turkey
Men's Boxing
European Amateur Championships
Bronze medal – third place	2004 Pula	Light Welterweight

Mustafa Karagöllü (born April 26, 1981) is a boxer from Turkey, who participated in the 2004 Summer Olympics.

== Career ==
He reached fifth place at the 1999 Junior European Amateur Boxing Championships in Rijeka, Croatia and took part in the World Championships in 2001 and 2003, where he, however, in each case before reaching the medals eliminated against Dimitar Shtilianov.

At the 2004 European Amateur Boxing Championships in Pula, Croatia he won a bronze medal in the light welterweight. After victories against José Gutiérrez from Spain, Roman Kulichenko from Israel and Ionuţ Gheorghe from Romania, he only lost in the semifinals against Alexander Maletin of Russia.

He competed at the 2004 Summer Olympics in Athens, Greece, defeated in the first round the Indian Vijender Singh, then lost in the second round against Ionuţ Gheorghe.

Between May 2005 and November 2008 has won 14 of his 15 professional boxing match . He was only lost against Domenico Spada in December 2006 in the match for the International Champion of the WBC middleweight.
