= Alessandro de Matos =

Brazilian boxer (born 1980)

Personal information
- Nationality: Brazilian
- Born: 26 September 1980 (age 45) Salvador, Bahia, Brazil
- Years active: 2004-2008

Sport
- Sport: Boxing

Alessandro de Matos (born 26 September 1980) is a Brazilian boxer. He competed in the men's light welterweight event at the 2004 Summer Olympics.

== Boxing career ==
=== Olympics ===
- 2004 - Represented Brazil in Boxing for the 2004 Athina Summer Games

=== Pro boxing career ===
Date	Opponent	Result
14 December 2004	Adelino Jesus Santos	Win - Unanimous Decision
8 July 2005	Lazaro Silva	Win - KO
5 August 2005	Joilson Fiusa	Win - TKO
11 April 2006	Luiz Augusto	Win - KO
4 August 2006	Marcos Santos Gomes	Win - TKO
15 November 2006	Sidney Siqueira	Win - TKO
28 March 2008	Rafael Dos Santos	Win - TKO
