= Spyridon Ioannidis =

Greek boxer (born 1981)

Personal information
- Nationality: Greek
- Born: 25 December 1981 (age 43)

Sport
- Sport: Boxing

Spyridon Ioannidis (born 25 December 1981) is a Greek boxer. He competed in the men's light welterweight event at the 2004 Summer Olympics.
