= Boxing at the 2002 Asian Games – Men's 57 kg =

Boxing competitions

Men's 57 kg at the 2002 Asian Games
- Venue: Masan Gymnasium
- Date: 2–13 October 2002
- Competitors: 18 from 18 nations

Medalists
gold medal	Mehrullah Lassi	Pakistan
silver medal	Galib Jafarov	Kazakhstan
bronze medal	Yasser Sheikhan	Syria
bronze medal	Chen Tongzhou	China

The men's featherweight (57 kilograms) event at the 2002 Asian Games took place from 2 to 13 October 2002 at Masan Gymnasium, Masan, South Korea.

== Schedule ==
All times are Korea Standard Time (UTC+09:00)

Date	Time	Event
Wednesday, 2 October 2002	14:00	Preliminary 1
Sunday, 6 October 2002	14:00	Preliminary 2
Tuesday, 8 October 2002	14:00	Quarterfinals
Friday, 11 October 2002	14:00	Semifinals
Sunday, 13 October 2002	14:00	Final

== Results ==
Legend

- RSCO — Won by referee stop contest outclassed
- WO — Won by walkover

=== Final ===
Final
Galib Jafarov (KAZ)	21
Mehrullah Lassi (PAK)	26

=== Top half ===
Preliminary 1

Preliminary 2
Yasser Sheikhan (SYR)	RSCO
Işanguly Meretnyýazow (TKM)
Roel Laguna (PHI)	11
Suttisak Samaksaman (THA)	18
Galib Jafarov (KAZ)	RSCO
Khurshed Djuraev (TJK)
Kim Song-guk (PRK)	18
Lee Sung-won (KOR)	22

Quarterfinals
Yasser Sheikhan (SYR)	24
Suttisak Samaksaman (THA)	23
Galib Jafarov (KAZ)	40
Lee Sung-won (KOR)	34

Semifinals
Yasser Sheikhan (SYR)
Galib Jafarov (KAZ)	WO

=== Bottom half ===
Preliminary 1
Ram Chandra Thapa Magar (NEP)	4
Jahongir Abdullaev (KGZ)	17
Troeung Sosvannak (CAM)	RSCO
Chong Iat Chi (MAC)

Preliminary 2
Mehrullah Lassi (PAK)	RSCO
Uranchimegiin Mönkh-Erdene (MGL)
Chung Chun-an (TPE)	RSC
Abdullateef Sadiq (QAT)
Chen Tongzhou (CHN)	29
Som Bahadur Pun (IND)	14
Jahongir Abdullaev (KGZ)	44
Troeung Sosvannak (CAM)	26

Quarterfinals
Mehrullah Lassi (PAK)	RSCO
Chung Chun-an (TPE)
Chen Tongzhou (CHN)	22
Jahongir Abdullaev (KGZ)	14

Semifinals
Mehrullah Lassi (PAK)	30
Chen Tongzhou (CHN)	18
