= Chen Tongzhou =

Chinese boxer

Personal information
- Nationality: Chinese
- Born: 16 October 1979 (age 46) Yueqing, Zhejiang, China

Sport
- Sport: Boxing
- Weight class: Featherweight, Lightweight, Light Welterweight

Chinese name
- Traditional Chinese: 陳通洲
- Simplified Chinese: 陈通洲
Transcriptions
Medal record
Asian Games
| Bronze medal – third place | 2002 Busan | Featherweight |
Asian Championships
| Bronze medal – third place | 2002 Seremban | Featherweight |
| Bronze medal – third place | 2009 Zhuhai | Light Welterweight |

Chen Tongzhou (born 16 October 1979) is a Chinese boxer. He competed in the men's lightweight event at the 2004 Summer Olympics.
