= Faisal Karim =

Pakistani boxer (born 1981)

Personal information
- Nationality: Pakistani
- Born: 21 December 1981 (age 43)

Sport
- Sport: Boxing

Faisal Karim (born 21 December 1981) is a Pakistani boxer. He competed in the men's light welterweight event at the 2004 Summer Olympics.
