= Boris Georgiev =

Bulgarian boxer (born 1982)

- Born: Boris Georgiev; December 5, 1982 (age 43); Sofia, Bulgaria
- Other names: Bobby George
- Nationality: Bulgaria
- Height: 1.75 m (5 ft 9 in)
- Division: Welterweight (-66,7 kg)
- Stance: Orthodox
- Years active: 2009, 2011-2012

Professional boxing record
- Total: 7
- Wins: 7
- By knockout: 3
- Losses: 0

Other information
- Boxing record from BoxRec
- Last updated on: September 23, 2009

Boris Georgiev
Medal record

Representing Bulgaria

Men's Boxing

Olympic Games
Bronze medal – third place	2004 Athens	Light Welterweight

European Amateur Championships
Gold medal – first place	2006 Plovdid	Light Welterweight
Silver medal – second place	2000 Tampere	Featherweight
Silver medal – second place	2002 Perm	Lightweight

EU Amateur Championships
Gold medal – first place	2004 Madrid	Light Welterweight
Silver medal – second place	2006 Pécs	Light Welterweight

Boris Georgiev (Bulgarian: Борис Георгиев) (born 5 December 1982) is an amateur boxer from Bulgaria who won a bronze medal at the 2004 Summer Olympics in the light welterweight class.

== Career ==
In 2000 he lost the European featherweight final against Ramaz Paliani (Turkey) 5:8. The same year he won a silver medal at the World Junior Championships in Budapest, Hungary, losing the final to Gyula Kate (HUN) 17–16.

In 2002 Alexander Maletin knocked him out in the lightweight final of the European Championships. A year later at the World Championships Georgiev was knocked out by Cuban legend Mario Kindelan. He qualified for the 2004 Summer Olympics by ending up in second place at the 3rd AIBA European 2004 Olympic Qualifying Tournament in Gothenburg, Sweden.

Olympics 2004:

- Defeated Nasserredine Fillali (Algeria) RSC 2 (1:38)
- Defeated Rock Allen (United States) 30–10
- Defeated Nurzhan Karimzhanov (Kazakhstan) 20–18
- Lost to Yudel Johnson Cedeno (Cuba) 9–13

2005 at the world championships he lost to Cuban Inocente Fiss 28–19.

2006 he won the European title at junior welterweight 25:17 against Russian Oleg Komisarov.

== Professional boxing record ==
7 Wins (2 (T)Knockouts, 1 decision), 0 Losses (0 (T)Knockouts, 0 decision), 0 Draws

Result	Record	Opponent	Type	Round, time	Date	Location	Notes
Win	3-0	(United Kingdom) Tamao Dwyer	TKO	4 (6), 1:47	2011-07-23	London, United Kingdom	
Win	2-0	(United Kingdom) Billy Smith	PTS	6 (6), 3:00	2011-06-25	Craigavon, United Kingdom	
Win	1-0	(Ghana) Florian Benke	TKO	1 (4), 1:09	2009-06-27	Portsmouth, United Kingdom	Pro debut

2012-03-04 Ideh Ockuko 4–3–0 York Hall, Bethnal Green, London, United Kingdom
