= Non Boonjumnong =

Thai boxer (born 1982)

Personal information
- Born: June 12, 1982 (age 44) Ratchaburi, Thailand

Sport
- Sport: Boxing
- Weight class: Light welterweight, Welterweight
Medal record
Men's boxing
Representing Thailand
World Amateur Championships
Silver medal – second place	2007 Chicago	Welterweight
Asian Games
Bronze medal – third place	2002 Busan	Welterweight
Asian Championships
Gold medal – first place	2002 Seremban	Welterweight
Southeast Asian Games
Gold medal – first place	2005 Bacolod	Welterweight
Gold medal – first place	2007 Nakhon Ratchasima	Light welterweight

Non Boonjumnong (Thai: นน บุญจำนงค์; RTGS: Non Bunchamnong, born June 12, 1982, as Manon Boonjumnong) is a Thai amateur boxer who won silver at welterweight at the World Championships 2007. In the older tournaments he is listed as "Manon".

== Career ==
Non, who is the younger brother of Olympic gold medalist Manus Boonjumnong, won a bronze medal at the 2002 Asian Games, when he lost his semifinal to eventual winner Kim Jung-Joo.

In 2005 he competed for Thailand at the Boxing World Cup in Moscow, Russia, losing both his matches in the preliminary round.

In 2007 in Chicago he beat Andrey Balanov to reach the finals but had to quit with an injury against American southpaw Demetrius Andrade. He trailed in points at the time.

At the 2008 Olympics he was upset by little-known Hosam Bakr Abdin.
