= Munir Abukeshek =

Palestinian boxer

Medal record
Men's Boxing
Representing Palestine
Asian Games
Bronze medal – third place	2002 Busan	Light heavyweight

Munir Abukeshek is an amateur boxer from Palestine. He won a bronze medal at Light heavyweight at the 2002 Asian Games. In doing so he became the first Palestinian to medal at those games.
