= Pedro Lima (boxer) =

Brazilian boxer (born 1983)

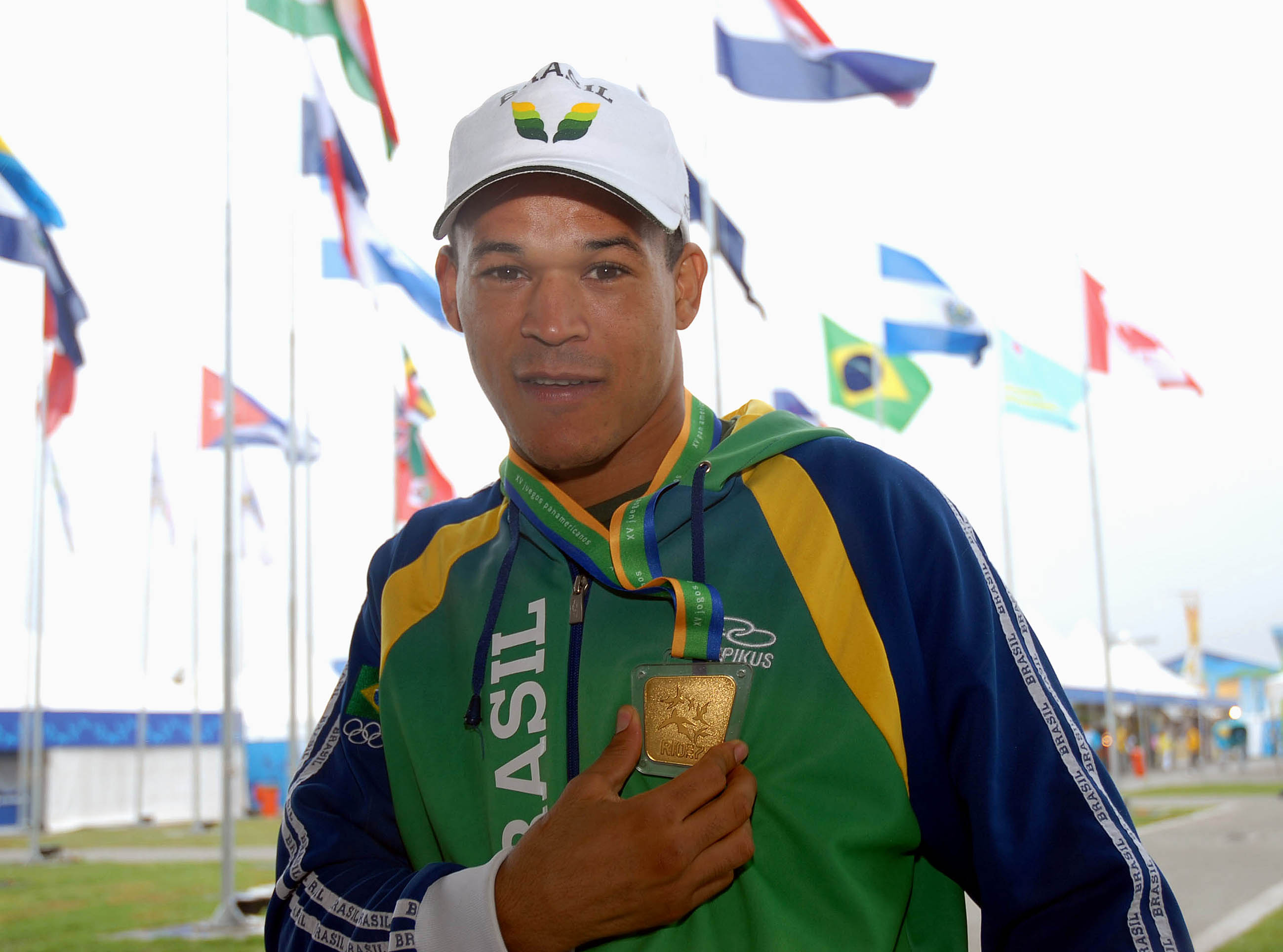

Personal information
- Born: 29 June 1983 (age 43) Riachão do Jacuípe, Bahia, Brazil

Sport
- Sport: Boxing
Medal record
Representing Brazil
Men's boxing
Pan American Games
Gold medal – first place	2007 Rio de Janeiro	Welterweight

Pedro Álvaro Santos de Lima (born 29 June 1983) is a Brazilian amateur boxer best known for winning the 2007 PanAm welterweight (152 lbs) title in 2007.

== Career ==
Lima fought in his home country and beat Ecuadorian Jaime Cortez 13-3, Jamaican Ricardo Smith 12-4, and US southpaw Demetrius Andrade, who became world champion later that year in the finals 7-6. Lima was the first boxing gold medalist for Brazil in 44 years.

At the world championships, he beat Ergazy Murzakarimov of Kyrgyzstan 21-9, and Polish Michal Starbala 12-8, but lost to Bakhyt Sarsekbayev and did not qualify for the Olympics.

At the first Olympic qualifier, he was upset by unknown John Jackson, and at the second he was again upset by a completely unknown Tureano Johnson.

== Professional boxing record ==
3 wins (3 decisions), 0 losses, 0 draws
Res.	Record	Opponent	Type	Rd., time	Date	Location	Notes
Win	1–0	(Brazil) Bryan de Oliveira	UD	4	2017-09-23	(Brazil) Clube Atlético Juventus, São Paulo	Professional boxing debut at Super middleweight.
