= Patrick Bogere =

Swedish boxer

Personal information
- Full name: Patrick Ssali Bogere
- Nickname: Red Alert
- Nationality: Sweden
- Born: 14 December 1981 (age 44) Kampala, Uganda
- Height: 1.77 m (5 ft 9 1/2 in)
- Weight: 64 kg (141 lb)

Sport
- Sport: Boxing
- Weight class: Light welterweight
- Club: Angered BC
- Coached by: Tommy Andersson

Patrick Ssali Bogere (born 14 December 1981 in Kampala, Uganda) is a retired amateur Swedish boxer and criminal of Ugandan descent. He claimed numerous Swedish championship titles in light welterweight boxing, represented Sweden at the 2004 Summer Olympics, and has held a dual citizenship between Sweden and Uganda in order to compete internationally. Throughout his amateur sporting career, Bogere fought and trained under his personal coach and mentor Tommy Andersson for Angered Boxing Club in Gothenburg before he later turned into professional in 2008.

Bogere qualified for Sweden in the men's light welterweight division (63.5 kg) at the 2004 Summer Olympics in Athens by receiving a berth and defeating Italy's Michele di Rocco for the title from the second AIBA European Olympic Qualifying Tournament in Warsaw, Poland. Bogere lost his opening match to Filipino boxer and three-time Olympic veteran Romeo Brin in a close decision of 35–43.

In late September 2006, Bogere was charged and later sentenced to four years in prison after he had been profoundly involved in an attempted robbery, unlawful disposal, serious threats against officers, and driving without license, ending his amateur career in boxing. Two years later, he was released on parole with probation from the prison, and went on to a professional boxing career. In 2019, along with his brother Johnson Bogere, he fled to Malaga in Spain after committing a brutal kidnapping and torture in west Sweden. Johnson Bogere is a top-member in the Bandidos Gothenburg chapter. They were captured there and extradited to Sweden and was, in early December 2019, sentenced to several years in prison for the torture.

== Personal life ==
Bogere is the father of Swedish footballer Cassandra Bogere.
