= Rock Allen =

American boxer (born 1981)

Rock Allen (born September 5, 1981 in Philadelphia, Pennsylvania) is an American former professional boxer who competed from 2005 to 2009. As an amateur, he competed at the 2004 Summer Olympics.

Allen is a twin and son of famous boxing trainer Naazim Richardson.

== Amateur career ==
A native of Philadelphia, Allen started boxing at the age of seven and had his first bout at nine. He had a stellar amateur career, and was the 2002 United States Amateur Light Welterweight Champion and National Golden Gloves Light Welterweight Champion.

Allen was also a member of the 2004 United States Olympic Team, competing in the Light Welterweight (64 kg) class. He qualified for the Olympic Games by ending up in second place at the 2nd AIBA American 2004 Olympic Qualifying Tournament in Rio de Janeiro, Brazil. Allen was eliminated in the 2nd round. His results are as follows:

- Round of 32 – Allen received a bye
- Round of 16 – Lost to Boris Georgiev of Bulgaria (30-10)

During his amateur career he defeated boxers such as Marcos Maidana and Lamont Peterson (twice) and finished his career as an amateur with a record of 168-10.

== Professional career ==
Allen turned pro in 2005 and was undefeated at 15-0 before a car accident stopped his career.

== Accident ==
Rock and his brother Tiger were severely injured in June 2011 in a car accident in a suburb of Philadelphia. He was hospitalized for over three months.
