= Kim Tae-kyu =

South Korean boxer (born 1978)

Personal information
- Nationality: South Korean
- Born: 19 May 1978 (age 47)

Sport
- Sport: Boxing

Kim Tae-kyu (born 19 May 1978) is a South Korean boxer. He competed in the men's flyweight event at the 2000 Summer Olympics.
