= Romeo Brin =

Filipino boxer (born 1973)

Personal information
- Full name: Romeo Brin
- Nationality: Filipino
- Born: March 10, 1973 (age 53) Puerto Princesa, Palawan, Philippines
- Height: 5 ft 7 in (170 cm)
- Weight: 141 lb (64 kg)

Sport
- Sport: Boxing
- Weight class: Light welterweight
- Club: Team Caltex
- Coached by: Nolito Velasco
Medal record
Men's boxing
Representing the Philippines
Asian Championships
Gold medal – first place	2004 Puerto Princesa	Light welterweight
SEA Games
Bronze medal – third place	2001 Negeri Sembilan	Light welterweight
Silver medal – second place	2005 Bacolod	Light welterweight

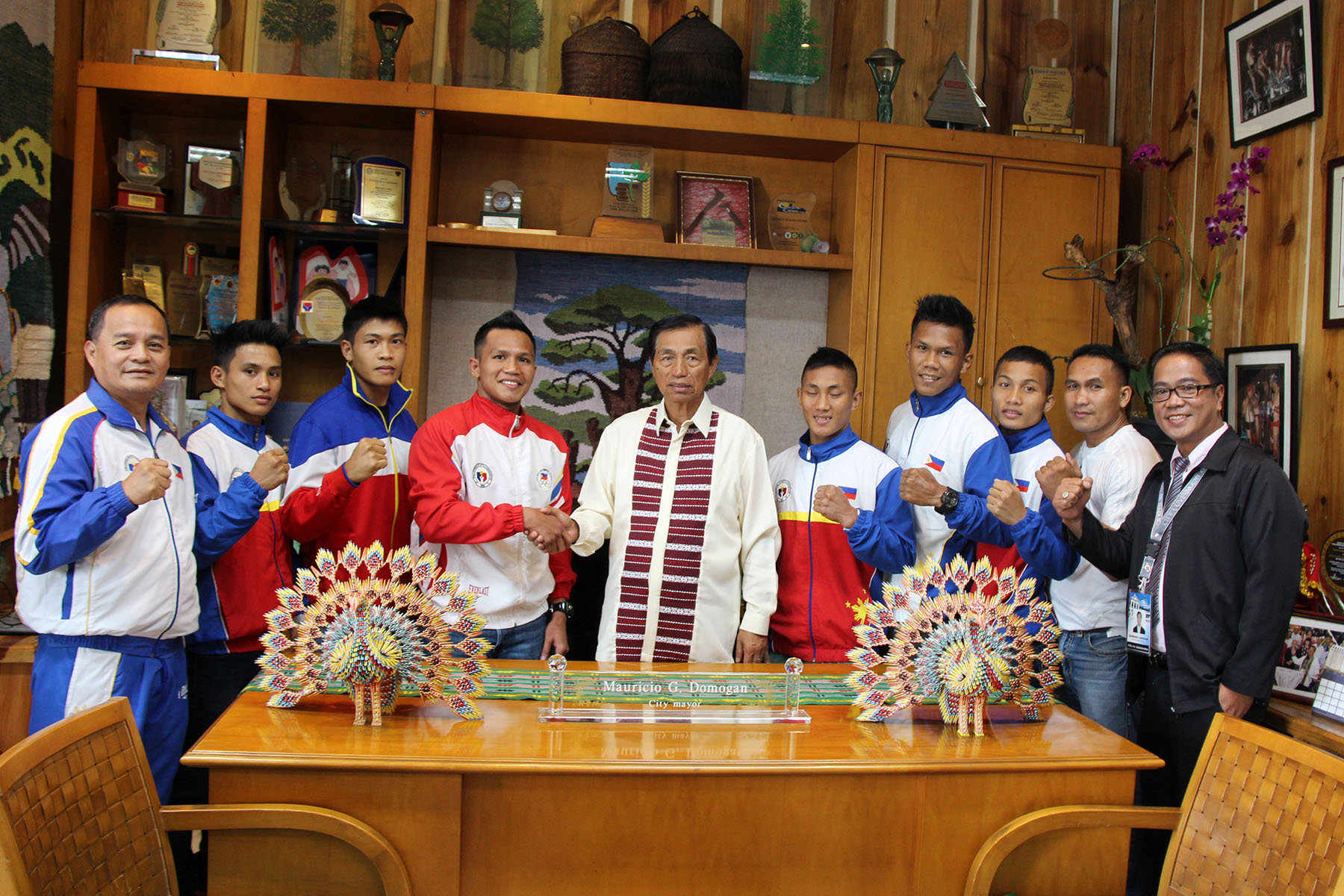
Mayor Mauricio Domogan with Philippine Boxing Team members Suarez and Ladan, alongside the Baguio trained Philippine team boxers and with their coach Romeo Brin.

Romeo Brin (born March 10, 1973]) is a Filipino former amateur boxer. He represented the Philippines in three editions of the Olympic Games (1996, 2000, and 2004), and has captured numerous medals in both lightweight and light-welterweight divisions at the Southeast Asian Games and at the Asian Championships. Throughout his sporting career, Brin has been training for Team Caltex Boxing Club under his head coach and mentor Nolito Velasco.

Brin made his official debut at the 1996 Summer Olympics in Atlanta, where he ousted his opening match to Cuba's Julio González Valladares in men's lightweight division (60 kg), receiving a default score of 13–24.

At the 2000 Summer Olympics in Sydney, Brin was upgraded to light welterweight division (63.5 kg), but lost the same round again to Belarus' Siarhei Bykovski in a close decision of 5–8.

Eight years after competing in his Olympic debut, Brin qualified for his third Filipino squad, as a 31-year-old, in the men's light welterweight division (63.5 kg) at the 2004 Summer Olympics in Athens by receiving a berth and capturing the title over Uzbekistan's Dilshod Mahmudov from the Asian Championships in his hometown Puerto Princesa. Brin was also appointed by the Philippine Olympic Committee to carry the Philippine flag in the opening ceremony, as his teammate Christopher Camat (originally selected to take the privilege) decided to witness his action for the next day's bout. Unlike his two previous Games, Brin outclassed Sweden's Patrick Bogere in the opening round with a satisfactory 43–35 triumph, before losing out his next match to Thailand's Manus Boonjumnong in a decisive score of 15–29.

Following an official retirement from his third Olympics, Brin is currently working as a national youth coach for the Amateur Boxing Association of the Philippines.
