= Inocente Fiss =

Cuban boxer (born 1980)

Personal information
- Born: June 7, 1980 (age 46)
Medal record
Men's Boxing
World Amateur Championships
Bronze medal – third place	2005 Mianyang	Light Welterweight
Pan American Games
Bronze medal – third place	2007 Rio	Light Welterweight

Inocente Fiss Carballosa (born June 7, 1980) is a Cuban boxer best known to win bronze at the 2005 World Amateur Boxing Championships in the men's junior welterweight division.

== Amateur career ==
In 1998 he won a bronze at the junior world championships, when he lost the semifinal to Yuri Tomashov. He became Cuban champion in 2005 and 2006, where he beat Carlos Banteaux 24:23 in the final. At the seniors 2005 World Championships he defeated Boris Georgiev but lost the semis against Dilshod Mahmudov.

He was part of the Cuban team that won the 2006 Boxing World Cup.

He did not participate at the 2007 national championships, but was sent to the PanAm Games 2007 where he was upset by Jonathan González (PR) in the semis and won a bronze, too. He did not participate in the national championships 2008 where Roniel Iglesias became the new titleholder.

== Defection and turning pro ==
In early 2010; Fiss, along with 6 other Cuban boxers, defected to the US and settled in Miami.

Fiss currently holds a professional record of 5(3)-0.
