= Choi Ki-soo =

South Korean boxer (born 1970)

Personal information
- Nationality: South Korean
- Born: 11 May 1970 (age 56)

Sport
- Sport: Boxing
- Weight class: Light heavyweight
Medal record
Asian Championships
Bronze medal – third place	2002 Seremban	Light heavyweight

Choi Ki-soo (born 11 May 1970) is a South Korean boxer. He competed at the 1992 Summer Olympics and the 2000 Summer Olympics.
