= Tulashboy Doniyorov =

Uzbekistani boxer

Personal information
- Full name: Толяшбой Донияров
- Nationality: Uzbekistan
- Born: March 30, 1981 (age 45)
- Height: 1.66 m (5 ft 5 in)
- Weight: 51 kg (112 lb)

Sport
- Sport: Boxing
- Weight class: Flyweight
Medal record
Asian Championships
Bronze medal – third place	2002 Seremban	Flyweight
Bronze medal – third place	2004 Puerto Princesa	Flyweight

Tulashboy Doniyorov (born March 30, 1981) is a boxer from Uzbekistan, who participated in the 2004 Summer Olympics.

== Career ==
2002 at the Asian Games he was eliminated in the first round by Filipino Violito Payla.

2004 at the Olympics he defeated Violito Payla and Ronald Siler but was defeated in the quarterfinals of the Flyweight (51 kg) division by France's Jérôme Thomas. Doniyorov qualified for the Athens Games by ending up in first place at the 1st AIBA Asian 2004 Olympic Qualifying Tournament in Guangzhou, China. In the final he defeated India's Akhil Kumar.

At the 2007 World Amateur Boxing Championships he lost in the first round to eventual winner Raushee Warren.
