= Morteza Sepahvand =

Iranian boxer

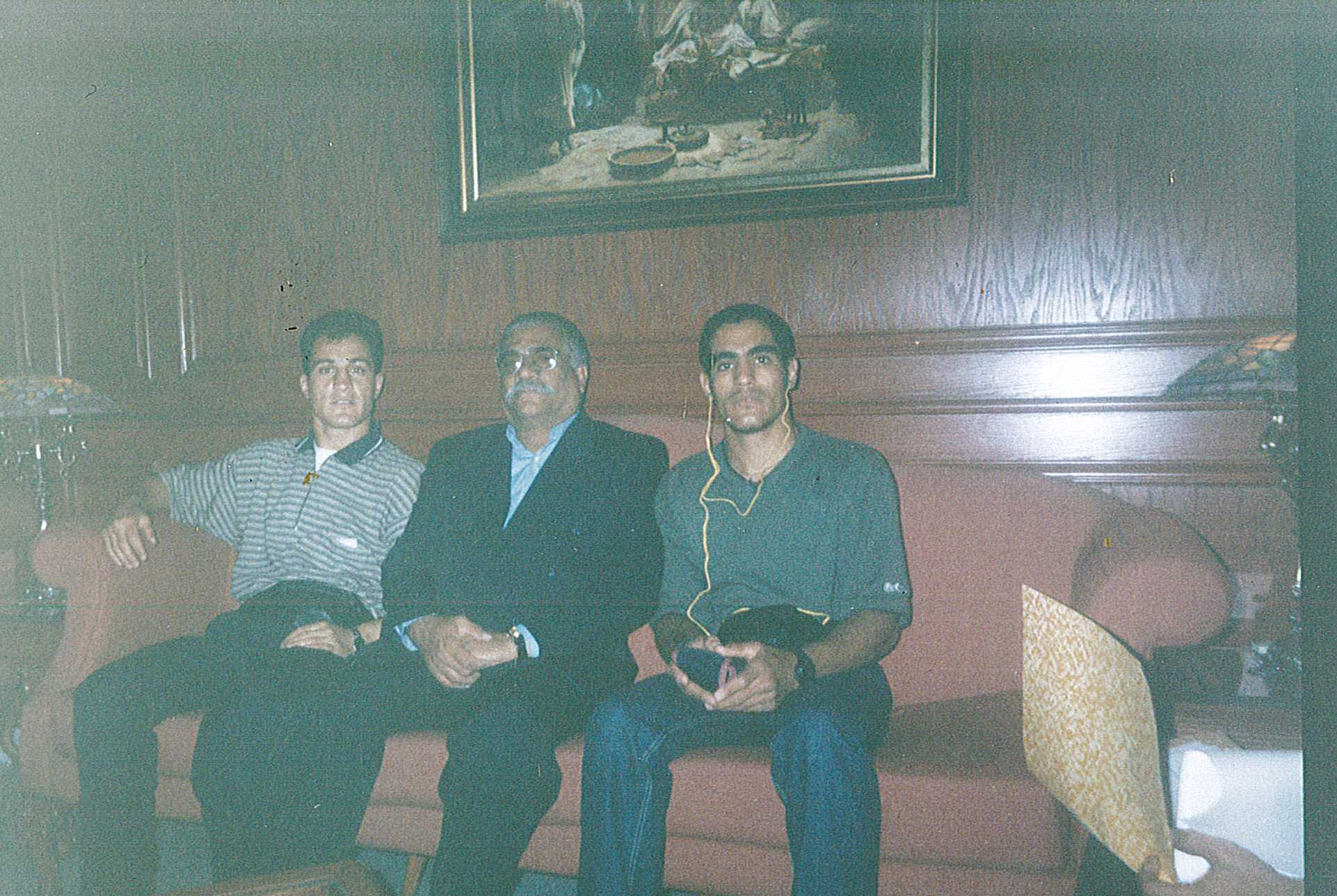
Morteza Sepahvand (far right)

Morteza Sepahvand (Persian: مرتضی سپهوند, born 7 August 1979) is an Iranian amateur boxer who qualified for the 2008 Olympics at junior welterweight. He was born in Khorramabad.

At the 2006 Asian Games he lost to Olympic Gold medalist Manus Boonjumnong.

At the 2007 World Amateur Boxing Championships he defeated Ionuţ Gheorghe then beat him again at the 2008 Summer Olympics.
