= Dilshod Mahmudov =

Uzbekistani boxer

Personal information
- Nickname: Doctor
- Nationality: Uzbekistani
- Born: 30 November 1982 (age 43) Tashkent, Uzbek SSR, Soviet Union
- Weight: Welterweight

Boxing career
- Stance: Southpaw

Boxing record
- Total fights: 4
- Wins: 4
- Win by KO: 3
- Losses: 0
Medal record
Men's boxing
Representing Uzbekistan
Asian Championships
Silver medal – second place	2004 Princesa	Light Welterweight
Asian Games
Gold medal – first place	2002 Busan	Lightweight
Bronze medal – third place	2006 Doha	Light Welterweight
World Championships
Silver medal – second place	2005 Mianyang	Light Welterweight

Dilshod Mahmudov (Дильшод Махмудов; born November 30, 1982) is a retired professional boxer from Uzbekistan who won several medals in international tournaments.

== Career ==
Formally of Uzbekistan, Dilshod Mahmudov is now based at BHS boxing gym in Blacktown, where he calls home. Under the watchful eyes of Lincoln Hudson and Fidel Tukel, entered the ring and stopped Yodmongkol Singmanasak (11-5-1,7KO’s) of Thailand in the fourth round, one month later took to the ring against Thai, Sataporn Singwancha (19 – 8, 11KO’s) where he showed his total class in destroying the former WBA #14 in 38 seconds into the first round. On February 13 in Melbourne he made it 3 out of 3, defeating Fijian Opeti Tagi (13 – 5, 8KO’s) again in the first round.

As an amateur Mahmudov was a silver medal winner at the world championships in Thailand in 2005. He replicated the silver medal in Moscow in 2008 when he came second at the AIBA world Cup. In the Athens Olympics in 2004 the eventual gold medallist defeated him by a single point and again in Beijing the gold medallist defeated him in similar fashion. In 2003 he defeated Australia’s own international star and former world IBO champion Billy Dib as a lightweight.

He won the silver medal at the 2005 World Amateur Boxing Championships in Mianyang, China losing to Serik Sapiyev.

He also participated at the 2004 Summer Olympics for his native Asian country. There he was defeated in the round of sixteen of the Light Welterweight (64 kg) division by Cuba's Yudel Johnson. He qualified for the Athens Games by winning the silver medal at the 2004 Asian Amateur Boxing Championships in Puerto Princesa, Philippines. In the final he was defeated by home fighter Romeo Brin.

At the 2007 World Championships he lost in the very first round to Frenchman Alexis Vastine (27:28).

=== AIBA World Cup Moscow results ===
2008 (as a Light welterweight) Took 2nd place.

== World amateur championships results ==
2003 (as a lightweight)

- Defeated Murat Khrachev (Russia) 43-22
- Defeated Bilal Dib (Australia) 21-5
- Lost to Gyula Kate (Hungary) 21-35

2005 (as a Light welterweight)

- Defeated Sergey Kudriavcev (Macedonia) 23-14
- Defeated Dmitrijs Sostaks (Latvia) RSCO
- Defeated Martin Dressen (Germany) 33-13
- Defeated Inocente Fiss (Cuba) 37-21
- Lost to Serik Sapiyev (Kazakhstan) 21-39

2007 (as a Light welterweight)

- Lost to Alexis Vastine (France) 27-28

=== Olympic results ===
2004 (as a Light welterweight)

- 1st round bye
- Defeated Alessandro Matos (Brazil) 26-16
- Lost to Yudel Johnson Cedeno (Cuba) 28-32

2008 (as a welterweight)

- Defeated Mehdi Khalsi (Morocco) 11-3
- Lost to Bakhyt Sarsekbayev 7-12

== Professional boxing record ==
4 fights	4 wins	0 losses
By knockout	3	0
By decision	1	0

No.	Result	Record	Opponent	Type	Round, time	Date	Location	Notes
4	Win	4–0	(Philippines) Rey Anton Olarte	UD	6	23 Sep 2010	Racecourse - Atrium Room, Flemington, Australia	
3	Win	3–0	(Fiji) Opeti Tagi	TKO	1 (6), 2:43	13 Feb 2010	Tribal Punishment Gym, Epping, Australia	
2	Win	2–0	(Thailand) Sataporn Singwancha	TKO	1 (4), 0:48	11 Dec 2009	University of New South Wales, Kensington, Australia	
1	Win	1–0	(Thailand) Yuttana Wongda	TKO	4 (6), 2:26	6 Nov 2009	Leagues Club, Parramatta, Australia	Professional debut
