= Manus Boonjumnong =

Thai boxer (born 1980)

Manus Boonjumnong TBh
Personal information
- Full name: มนัส บุญจำนงค์
- Nicknames: Phle boi klap chai (เพลย์บอยกลับใจ) "Repentance Playboy"
- Nationality: Thailand
- Born: June 23, 1980 (age 46) Ratchaburi, Thailand
- Height: 1.73 m (5 ft 8 in)
- Weight: 64 kg (141 lb); 72.64 kg (160.1 lb)

Sport
- Sport: Boxing
- Weight class: Light Welterweight; Middleweight
- Club: Royal Thai Army

Manus Boonjumnong
Medal record

Men's Boxing

Representing Thailand

Olympic Games
Gold medal – first place	2004 Athens	Light Welterweight
Silver medal – second place	2008 Beijing	Light Welterweight

World Amateur Championships
Bronze medal – third place	2003 Bangkok	Light Welterweight

Asian Games
Gold medal – first place	2006 Doha	Light Welterweight

Manus Boonjumnong (Thai: มนัส บุญจำนงค์; RTGS: Manat Bunchamnong, born June 23, 1980) is a Thai boxer who won the Olympics at Light Welterweight (60–64 kg) at the 2004 Summer Olympics. He is the older brother of Non Boonjumnong.

== Amateur career ==
At the 2003 World Amateur Boxing Championships in his home town Bangkok, the light-footed counterpuncher won the bronze medal losing to Russian Alexander Maletin.

In 2006, he made a successful comeback when he was crowned Asian champion. He narrowly defeated reigning 2005 world champion Serik Sapiyev at the tournament although he was knocked down.

In Chicago at the 2007 World Amateur Boxing Championships, he was upset early against Japanese Masatsugu Kawachi.

== Olympics 2004 ==
Boonjumnong qualified for the Athens Games by ending up in first place at the 1st AIBA Asian 2004 Olympic Qualifying Tournament in Guangzhou, China. In the final he defeated Kazakhstan's Nurzhan Karimzhanov. In Athens he beat reigning world champion Willy Blain and the Cuban Yudel Johnson in the final and won gold.
2004 Olympic Results

- Defeated Spyridon Ioannidis (Greece) 28:16
- Defeated Romeo Brin (Philippines) 29:15
- Defeated Willy Blain (France) 20:8
- Defeated Ionut Gheorghe (Romania) 30:9
- Defeated Yudel Johnson (Cuba) 17:11

== Olympics 2008 ==
- Defeated Masatsugu Kawachi (Japan) 8:1
- Defeated Serik Sapiyev (Kazakhstan) 7:5
- Defeated Roniel Iglesias Sotolongo (Cuba) 10:5
- Lost to Manuel Félix Díaz (Dominican Rep.) 12:4

== Professional boxing record ==
6 fights	5 wins	1 loss
By knockout	3	1
By decision	2	0

Result	Record	Opponent	Type	Round, time	Date	Location	Notes
Loss	5–1	(Canada) Ryan Ford	TKO	5 (8)	April 22, 2016	7th Infantry Division, Mae Rim, Chiang Mai, Thailand	
Win	5–0	(Iran) David Saul	TKO	5 (8)	March 25, 2016	Pa Bon, Thailand	
Win	4–0	(Iran) Suik Haidari	TKO	3 (8)	January 22, 2016	Wat Phraboromthat Chaiya, Surat Thani, Thailand	
Win	3–0	(Indonesia) Jonatan Simamora	KO	1 (6)	December 7, 2015	Hua Hin Center, Hua Hin, Thailand	
Win	2–0	(Indonesia) Marco Tuhumury	UD	4	September 27, 2015	Central Plaza Westgate Department Store, Bangkok, Thailand	
Win	1–0	(Indonesia) Jamed Jalarante	UD	4	June 27, 2015	Hua Mark Indoor Stadium, Bangkok, Thailand	Professional boxing debut.
