= Boxing at the 2000 Summer Olympics – Bantamweight =

Boxing competitions

Men's bantamweight boxing at the Games of the XXVII Olympiad
- Venue: Sydney Convention and Exhibition Centre
- Date: 16 September to 30 September 2000
- Competitors: 28 from 28 nations

Medalists
1st place, gold medalist(s)		Guillermo Rigondeaux	Cuba
2nd place, silver medalist(s)		Raimkul Malakhbekov	Russia
3rd place, bronze medalist(s)		Serhiy Danylchenko	Ukraine
3rd place, bronze medalist(s)		Clarence Vinson	United States

The men's bantamweight boxing competition at the 2000 Olympic Games in Sydney was held from 16 September to 30 September at the Sydney Convention and Exhibition Centre.

== Competition format ==
Like all Olympic boxing events, the competition was a straight single-elimination tournament. This event consisted of 28 boxers who have qualified for the competition through various qualifying tournaments held in 1999 and 2000. The competition began with a preliminary round on 16 September, where the number of competitors was reduced to 16, and concluded with the final on 30 September. As there were fewer than 32 boxers in the competition, a number of boxers received a bye through the preliminary round. Both semi-final losers were awarded bronze medals.

All bouts consisted of four rounds of two minutes each, with one-minute breaks between rounds. Punches scored only if the white area on the front of the glove made full contact with the front of the head or torso of the opponent. Five judges scored each bout; three of the judges had to signal a scoring punch within one second for the punch to score. The winner of the bout was the boxer who scored the most valid punches by the end of the bout.

== Competitors ==
Name	Country
Justin Kane	Australia
Sontaya Wongprates	Thailand
Serhiy Danylchenko	Ukraine
Dingko Singh	India
Alisher Rahimov	Uzbekistan
Cho Seok-Hwan	South Korea
Hichem Blida	Algeria
Orlando Cruz	Puerto Rico
Theimuraz Khurtsilava	Georgia
Aram Ramazyan	Armenia
Ceferino Labarda	Argentina
Raimkul Malakhbekov	Russia
Rachid Bouaita	France
Clarence Vinson	United States
Talaybek Kadyraliev	Kyrgyzstan
Herman Ngoudjo	Cameroon
George Olteanu	Romania
Artur Mikaelyan	Greece
Abdu Tebazalwa	Uganda
César Morales	Mexico
Moez Zemzani	Tunisia
Guillermo Rigondeaux	Cuba
Kazumasa Tsujimoto	Japan
Hassan Ouchiekh	Morocco
Mai Kangde	China
Agasi Agaguloglu	Turkey
Nahomar Cermeno	Venezuela
Riaz Durgahed	Mauritius

== Results ==
All times are Australian Time (UTC+10)

Round of 32; Saturday, September 16, 2000; 13:00 & 19:30
Alisher Rahimov (UZB)	RSC
Cho Seok-Hwan (KOR)
Hichem Blida (ALG)	11
Orlando Cruz (PUR)	10
Theimuraz Khurtsilava (GEO)	12
Aram Ramazyan (ARM)	9
Ceferino Labarda (ARG)
Raimkul Malakhbekov (RUS)	RSC
Rachid Bouaita (FRA)	2
Clarence Vinson (USA)	9
Taalaybek Kadyraliyev (KGZ)	RSC
Herman Ngoudjo (CMR)
George Olteanu (ROM)	7
Artur Mikaelyan (GRE)	2
Abdul Tebazalwa (UGA)	8
César Morales (MEX)	13
Moez Zemzeni (TUN)
Guillermo Rigondeaux (CUB)	KO
Kazumasa Tsujimoto (JPN)	12^{+}
Hassan Oucheikh (MAR)	12
Mai Kangde (CHN)	4
Agasi Agaguloglu (TUR)	17
Nehomar Cermeno (VEN)	16
Riaz Durgahed (MRI)	4

Round of 16; Thursday, September 21, 2000; 13:00 & 19:30
Justin Kane (AUS)	15
Sontaya Wongprates (THA)	13
Serhiy Danylchenko (UKR)	14
Dingko Singh (IND)	5
Alisher Rahimov (UZB)	17
Hichem Blida (ALG)	8
Theimuraz Khurtsilava (GEO)	7
Raimkul Malakhbekov (RUS)	13
Clarence Vinson (USA)	12
Talaybek Kadyraliev (KGZ)	7
George Olteanu (ROM)	RSC
César Morales (MEX)
Guillermo Rigondeaux (CUB)	RSC
Kazumasa Tsujimoto (JPN)
Agasi Agaguloglu (TUR)	11
Nehomar Cermeno (VEN)	3

Quarter-finals; Tuesday, September 26, 2000; 13:00 & 19:30
Justin Kane (AUS)
Serhiy Danylchenko (UKR)	RSC
Alisher Rahimov (UZB)	10
Raimkul Malakhbekov (RUS)	16
Clarence Vinson (USA)	26
George Olteanu (ROM)	19
Guillermo Rigondeaux (CUB)	14
Agasi Agaguloglu (TUR)	5

Semi-finals; Thursday, September 28, 2000; 19:30
Serhiy Danylchenko (UKR)	10
Raimkul Malakhbekov (RUS)	15
Clarence Vinson (USA)	6
Guillermo Rigondeaux (CUB)	18

Final; Saturday, September 30, 2000; 13:00
Raimkul Malakhbekov (RUS)	12
Guillermo Rigondeaux (CUB)	18
