= List of United States national amateur boxing flyweight champions =

Below is a list of United States national Amateur Boxing Flyweight Champions, also known as United States Amateur Champions, along with the state or region which they represented. The weight class was contested at 105 pounds between 1888 and 1912. It was contested at 108 pounds between 1913 and 1921, before moving to 112 pounds in 1922, where it is contested at currently. The United States National Boxing Championships bestow the title of United States Amateur Champion on amateur boxers for winning the annual national amateur boxing tournament organized by USA Boxing, the national governing body for Olympic boxing and is the United States' member organization of the International Amateur Boxing Association (AIBA). It is one of four premier amateur boxing tournaments, the others being the National Golden Gloves Tournament, which crowns its own amateur flyweight champion, the Police Athletic League Tournament, and the United States Armed Forces Tournament, all sending champions to the US Olympic Trials.

- 1888 - D. O'Brien, New York, NY
- 1889 - M. Rice, New York, NY (spring), D. O'Brien, New York, NY (winter
- 1890 - T. Murphy, New York, NY
- 1891 - Not held
- 1892 - Not held
- 1893 - G. Ross, Lex AC
- 1894 - J. Madden, New York, NY
- 1895 - J. Salmon, Pittsburgh, PA
- 1896 - J. Mylan, Yemassee AC
- 1897 - G.W. Owens, Pittsburgh, PA
- 1898 - Not held
- 1899 - David Watson, Paterson, NJ
- 1900 - W. Cullen, New York, NY
- 1901 - J. Brown, New York, NY
- 1902 - W. Schumaker, Avonia AC
- 1903 - R. McKinley, Riverside BC
- 1904 - J. O'Brien, Cambridge, MA
- 1905 - Fred Stingel, Boston, MA
- 1906 - James Carroll, Olympic Club
- 1907 - J. O'Brien, Cambridge, MA
- 1908 - Angus McDougal, Boston, MA
- 1909 - Arthur Souss, Cambridge, MA
- 1910 - James Rothwell, Boston, MA
- 1911 - John Fallon, Boston, MA
- 1912 - James Lynch, Cambridge, MA
- 1913 - Barney Snyder, Boston, MA
- 1914 - J. Downs, Cleveland, OH
- 1915 - Howard Root, Cleveland, OH
- 1916 - Thomas Darey, Boston, MA
- 1917 - Thomas Fall, Lowell, MA
- 1918 - Joe Wiles, Chelsea, MA
- 1919 - D. Kamins, Clark House AA
- 1920 - A.J. Devito, (who later fought as Frankie Genaro), New York, NY
- 1921 - John Hamm, Pittsburgh, PA
- 1922 - T.P. McManus, Pittsburgh, PA
- 1923 - Al Bender, New York, NY
- 1924 - Fidel LaBarba, Los Angeles, CA
- 1925 - Alfred Rollinson, Shelton, CT
- 1926 - Lawrence Lyons, Pittsburgh, PA
- 1927 - Harry Lieberson, New York, NY
- 1928 - Hymie Miller, Los Angeles, CA
- 1929 - James Kerr, Grand Rapids, MI
- 1930 - George Ostrow, Revere, MA
- 1931 - Babe Triscaro, Cleveland, OH
- 1932 - Lou Salica, New York, NY
- 1933 - Tony Valore, Cleveland, OH
- 1934 - Thomas Barry, Chicago, IL
- 1935 - Johnny Marcelline, Philadelphia, PA
- 1936 - Jackie Wilson, Cleveland, OH
- 1937 - Bill Speary, Philadelphia, PA
- 1938 - Robert Carroll, Newark, NJ
- 1939 - Jose Mercado, Hawaii
- 1940 - Johnny Manaio, Honolulu, HI
- 1941 - Lawrence Torphy, Philadelphia, PA
- 1942 - Leroy Jackson, Cleveland, OH
- 1943 - Anthony Peppi, Boston, MA
- 1944 - Cecil Schoonmaker, New York, NY
- 1945 - Keith Hamilton, New Orleans, LA
- 1946 - David Buna, Hawaii
- 1947 - Robert Holiday, Cincinnati, OH
- 1948 - Frankie Sodano, Philadelphia, PA
- 1949 - Johnny Ortega, Oakland, CA
- 1950 - Sherman Nelson, Philadelphia, PA
- 1951 - Billy Peacock, Philadelphia, PA
- 1952 - Billy Hill, Washington, DC
- 1953 - Bobby Singleton, Philadelphia, PA
- 1954 - Charles Branch, Philadelphia, PA
- 1955 - Heiji Shimabokuru, Honolulu, HI
- 1956 - Albert Pell, New York, NY
- 1957 - Albert Pell, New York, NY
- 1958 - Ray Perez, Honolulu, HI
- 1959 - Gil Yanez, Toledo, OH
- 1960 - Wayman Gray, Monroe, MI
- 1961 - Pete Gonzalez, Portland, OR
- 1962 - George Colon, New York, NY
- 1963 - Lucas Matseke, South Africa
- 1964 - Melvin Miller, Butte, MT
- 1965 - Sammy Goss, Trenton, NJ
- 1966 - Nicky Priola, Lake Charles, LA
- 1967 - Roland Miller, Billings, MT
- 1968 - Kenneth Bazer, New Orleans, LA
- 1969 - Caleb Long, Army
- 1970 - Eddie Santiago, New York, NY
- 1971 - Bobby Hunter, Columbia, SC
- 1972 - Bobby Hunter, Charles, SC
- 1973 - Richard Rozelle, Columbus, OH
- 1974 - Greg Richardson, Cleveland, OH
- 1975 - Richard Rozelle, Columbus, OH
- 1976 - Leo Randolph, Tacoma, WA
- 1977 - Jerome Coffee, Nashville, TN
- 1978 - Mike Felde, Missoula, MT
- 1979 - Harold Petty, St. Louis, MO
- 1980 - Richard Sandoval, Pomona, CA
- 1981 - Fred Perkins, Army
- 1982 - Steve McCrory, Detroit, MI (spring); Todd Hickman, Akron, OH (winter)
- 1983 - Steve McCrory, Detroit, MI
- 1984 - Bernard Price, Muncie, IN
- 1985 - Arthur Johnson, St. Louis, MO
- 1986 - Arthur Johnson, St. Louis, MO
- 1987 - Arthur Johnson, St. Louis, MO
- 1988 - Tony Gonzalez, San Diego, CA
- 1989 - Brian Lonon, Army
- 1990 - Rudy Bradley, Army
- 1991 - Tim Austin, Cincinnati, OH
- 1992 - Arturo Hoffman, Dade City, FL
- 1993 - Russell Roberts, Gretna, LA
- 1994 - Carlos Navarro, Los Angeles, CA
- 1995 - Arnulfo Bravo, Virginia City, NV
- 1996 - Ramases Patterson, River Rouge, MI
- 1997 - Clarence Vinson, Washington, DC
- 1998 - Clarence Vinson, Washington, DC
- 1999 - Roberto Benitez, Brooklyn, NY
- 2000 - Roberto Benitez, Brooklyn, NY
- 2001 - Roberto Benitez, Brooklyn, NY
- 2002 - Raul Martinez, San Antonio, TX
- 2003 - Raul Martinez, San Antonio, TX
- 2004 - Ron Siler, Cincinnati, OH
- 2005 - Rau'shee Warren, Cincinnati, OH
- 2006 - Rau'shee Warren, Cincinnati, OH
- 2007 - Rau'shee Warren, Cincinnati, OH
- 2008 - Randy Caballero, Coachella, CA
- 2009 - Louie Byrd, Denver, CO
- 2010 - Louie Byrd, Denver, CO
- 2011 - David Carlton, Cincinnati, OH
- 2012 - Santos Vasquez, Sparks, NV
