= Boxing at the 2002 Asian Games – Men's 54 kg =

Boxing competitions

Men's 54 kg at the 2002 Asian Games
- Venue: Masan Gymnasium
- Date: 2–13 October 2002
- Competitors: 17 from 17 nations

Medalists
gold medal	Kim Won-il	South Korea
silver medal	Bekzod Khidirov	Uzbekistan
bronze medal	Abdusalom Khasanov	Tajikistan
bronze medal	Taalaibek Kadiraliev	Kyrgyzstan

The men's bantamweight (54 kilograms) event at the 2002 Asian Games took place from 2 to 13 October 2002 at Masan Gymnasium, Masan, South Korea.

== Schedule ==
All times are Korea Standard Time (UTC+09:00)

Date	Time	Event
Wednesday, 2 October 2002	14:00	Preliminary 1
Thursday, 3 October 2002	14:00	Preliminary 2
Sunday, 6 October 2002	14:00	Quarterfinals
Saturday, 12 October 2002	14:00	Semifinals
Sunday, 13 October 2002	14:00	Final

== Results ==
Legend

- KO — Won by knockout
- RSCO — Won by referee stop contest outclassed

=== Final ===
Final
Kim Won-il (KOR)	27
Bekzod Khidirov (UZB)	17

=== Top half ===
Preliminary 1

Preliminary 2
Serdar Şihimow (TKM)
Abdusalom Khasanov (TJK)	KO
Choe Phyong-chol (PRK)	26
Dingko Singh (IND)	6
Chotipat Wongprates (THA)	15
Tej Bahadur Thapa Magar (NEP)	1
Kim Won-il (KOR)	RSCO
Kazumasa Tsujimoto (JPN)

Quarterfinals
Abdusalom Khasanov (TJK)	20
Choe Phyong-chol (PRK)	16
Chotipat Wongprates (THA)	11
Kim Won-il (KOR)	24

Semifinals
Abdusalom Khasanov (TJK)	7
Kim Won-il (KOR)	17

=== Bottom half ===
Preliminary 1
Manju Wanniarachchi (SRI)
Bekzod Khidirov (UZB)	RSCO

Preliminary 2
Taalaibek Kadiraliev (KGZ)	25
Abid Ali (PAK)	11
Meshari Al-Fadhli (KUW)	17
Cheong Wai (MAC)	9
Mean Soeurn (CAM)
Tolen Kanatov (KAZ)	RSCO
Ferdie Gamo (PHI)	10
Bekzod Khidirov (UZB)	11

Quarterfinals
Taalaibek Kadiraliev (KGZ)	RSCO
Meshari Al-Fadhli (KUW)
Tolen Kanatov (KAZ)	11
Bekzod Khidirov (UZB)	22

Semifinals
Taalaibek Kadiraliev (KGZ)
Bekzod Khidirov (UZB)	RSCO
