= Boxing in Armenia =

Boxing (Armenian: բռնցքամարտ břntsk'amart, literally "fist fight") in Armenia is a popular sport, that existed in the Armenian Highland since ancient times. Amateur boxing schools in the country appeared in early 1900s, by the mid-1950s boxing became one of the traditional sports in Armenia. In 1956, Vladimir Yengibaryan won a gold medal at the Olympics for the Soviet team. In the early 21st century, professional and amateur boxing in Armenia reached another peak. Most notably Arthur Abraham and Vic Darchinyan won several professional world champion titles. Dozens of amateur boxers have been placed in the top 3 of world and European competitions for various weight categories. Vladimir Yengibarian was among the first individuals to open professional boxing schools in Armenia. The sport is regulated by the Armenian Boxing Federation.

== History ==
=== Ancient history ===
Boxing was practiced in the Armenian Highland since ancient times. Petroglyphs have been found in the region depicting a fight between two men, similar to boxing.

King of Armenia Varazdat (Varasdates) is often regarded as one of the last competitors in the Ancient Olympic Games. Varazdat's victory in fisticuffs is recorded in Moses of Chorene's History of Armenia. Since he reigned from 374–78, conjecture places his victory in the 360s, sometimes recorded in 369. The king's win is commemorated with a memorial plate in Olympia, Greece, at the Olympic Museum.

=== Modern history ===
The modern history of boxing in Armenia starts in the early twentieth century.

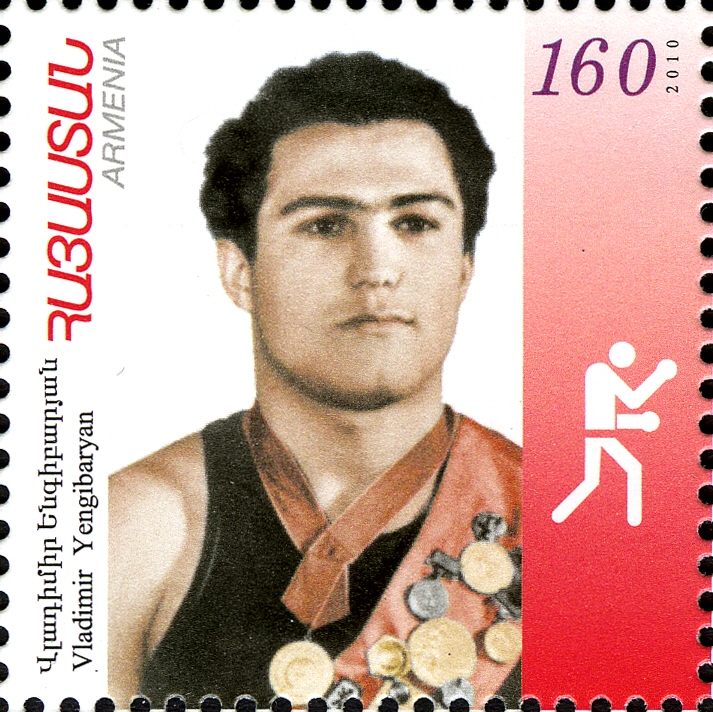
2010 Armenian post stamp showing Vladimir Yengibaryan

==== Soviet era ====
The Soviet regime in Armenia was established in 1920. Four years later in 1924, Gevorg Alikhanian and Mkhitar Aybabian started the first boxing school in the city of Leninakan and a year later Alikhanian started training teenage boys in Yerevan. In 1931, the first Armenian boxing championship was held among 30 boxers. The sport developed mostly in the large urban areas.

The first major success of Armenian boxing took place in 1956. Vladimir Yengibaryan of Yerevan won a gold medal for the Soviet Union at the Melbourne Olympics. Soviet Armenian boxing reached its peak during the period from 1970s to early 1990s. Notable figures of the era include Mekhak Ghazaryan and Israyel Hakobkokhyan, with the latter becoming a World Amateur Champion in 1989.

In 1957 Yengibaryan was awarded both the Honoured Master of Sports of the USSR and the Order of the Red Banner of Labour for his achievements in boxing. After finishing his career, he founded the Boxing Children and Youth Sport School in Yerevan. This was the first school of its kind in the USSR.

==== Independent era ====
Armenia became an independent state in 1991. The Armenian Boxing Federation, the governing body of the sport in Armenia, was founded the same year. In two years it was admitted to the European Amateur Boxing Association and International Boxing Association as a full member.

Numerous professional Armenian boxers came to international fame, some representing Armenia, some foreign countries. Vic Darchinyan and Arthur Abraham both won IBF titles in Flyweight and Middleweight categories respectively are the most notable ones.

Armenia has two Boxing World Cup champions. Nshan Munchyan was undefeated in 48 kg category in 1994. Andranik Hakobyan stood at the top of the 75 kg category in 2008. In amateur boxing, Armenian athletes have been relatively successful. Nshan Munchyan became a World Champion in 1993 in Light Flyweight. Hovhannes Danielyan (2008), Eduard Hambardzumyan (2008) and Hrachik Javakhyan (2010) became Champions of Europe.

Boxers in Armenia
Year	Number
2005	3,259
2010	3,021
2021	3,036

On September 3, 2011, the first ever professional boxing event in Armenia took place in the Karen Demirchyan Sports Complex. All Armenian boxers won their matches. The event was headlined by Vic Darchinyan and Evans Mbamba. Darchinyan defeated Mbamba to retain his IBO Bantamweight title. Armenia has hosted the 2012 AIBA Youth World Boxing Championships and the Men's 2022 European Amateur Boxing Championships.

Armenia had over 3,000 people practicing box in the 21st century. In 2021 Armenia had 3,036 boxers (including 62 females) and 151 coaches and trainers.

== Records ==
=== Olympics ===
During the Soviet era, two boxers from Yerevan, Armenian SSR also won Olympic medals. Vladimir Yengibaryan acquired a gold medal in 1956 and David Torosyan a bronze medal in 1976.

The only Olympic medal for Armenia was won by Hrachik Javakhyan at the 2008 Beijing Games.

=== Professional World Championships ===
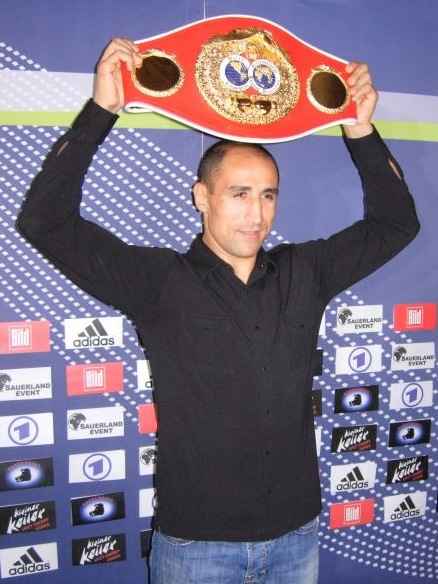
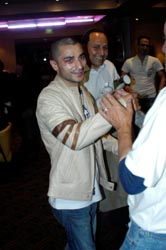
Arthur Abraham (left) and Vic Darchinyan (right).

==== Men ====
Two boxers: Vic Darchinyan and Arthur Abraham have won several world champion titles, which are listed below.

Boxer	Organization	Weight	Years
Vic Darchinyan	IBF	Flyweight	2004-2007
Vic Darchinyan	IBF	Super Flyweight	2008-2009
Vic Darchinyan	WBC	Super Flyweight	2008-2010
Vic Darchinyan	WBA	Super Flyweight	2008-2010
Arthur Abraham	IBF	Middleweight	2005-2009
Arthur Abraham	WBO	Super Middleweight	2012-

==== Women ====
German Armenian boxer Susianna Kentikian has won numerous world champion titles, which are listed below.

Boxer	Organization	Weight	Years
Susianna Kentikian	WBA	Flyweight	2007-2012
Susianna Kentikian	WIBF	Flyweight	2007-2012
Susianna Kentikian	WBO	Flyweight	2009-2012

=== Amateur World Championships ===
Year	Athlete	Weight	Position	Ref
(Finland) 1993 Tampere	Nshan Munchyan	Light Flyweight (–48 kilograms)	Gold	
(Finland) 1993 Tampere	Arszak Avartekyan	Heavyweight (–91 kilograms)	Bronze	
(Germany) 1995 Berlin	Artur Mikelyan	Bantamweight (–54 kilograms)	Bronze	
(Hungary) 1997 Budapest	Aram Ramazyan	Bantamweight (–54 kilograms)	Bronze	
(China) 2005 Mianyang	Artak Malumyan	Light Heavyweight (–81 kilograms)	Bronze	
(Italy) 2009 Milan	Andranik Hakobyan	Middleweight (–75 kilograms)	Silver	
(Germany) 2017 Hamburg	Hovhannes Bachkov	Light welterweight	Bronze	
(Russia) 2019 Yekaterinburg	Hovhannes Bachkov	Light welterweight	Bronze	
(Serbia) 2021 Belgrade	Hovhannes Bachkov	Light welterweight	Bronze	
(Serbia) 2021 Belgrade	Davit Chaloyan	Super heavyweight	Silver	

=== European Championships ===
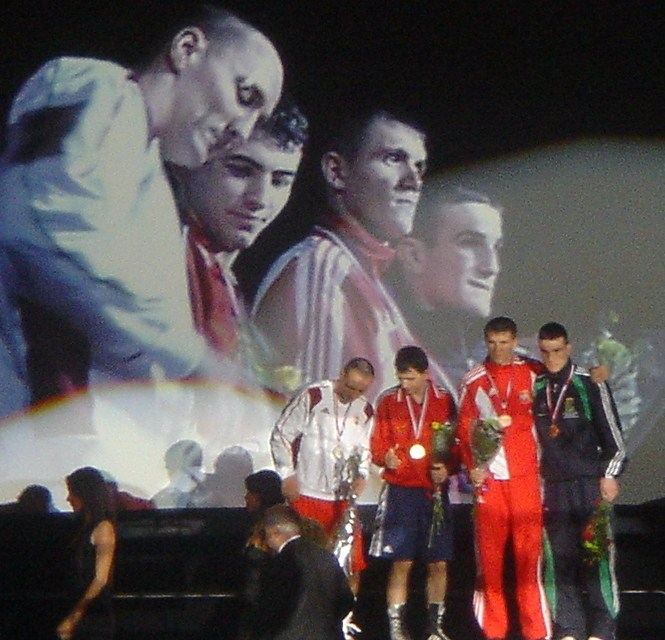
Eduard Hambardzumyan (left) won a gold medal at the 2008 European Championship

Year	Athlete	Weight	Position	Ref
(Turkey) 1993 Bursa	Mechak Kasaryan	Lightweight (–60 kg)	Bronze	
(Turkey) 1993 Bursa	Armen Gevorkyan	Light Welterweight (–63.5 kg)	Bronze	
(Belarus) 1998 Minsk	Vachtang Darchinyan	Flyweight (–51 kilograms)	Bronze	
(Belarus) 1998 Minsk	Artyom Simonyan	Featherweight (–57 kilograms)	Silver	
(Belarus) 1998 Minsk	Artur Gevorkyan	Lightweight (–60 kilograms)	Bronze	
(Finland) 2000 Tampere	Aram Ramazyan	Bantamweight (–54 kilograms)	Bronze	
(Finland) 2000 Tampere	Bagrat Oghanian	Super Heavyweight (+91 kilograms)	Bronze	
(Russia) 2002 Perm	Marat Tovmasian	Heavyweight (–91 kilograms)	Bronze	
(Bulgaria) 2006 Plovdiv	Hovhannes Danielyan	Light Flyweight (–48 kilograms)	Bronze	
(Bulgaria) 2006 Plovdiv	Hrachik Javakhyan	Lightweight (–60 kilograms)	Silver	
(United Kingdom) 2008 Liverpool	Hovhannes Danielyan	Light Flyweight (–48 kilograms)	Gold	
(United Kingdom) 2008 Liverpool	Eduard Hambardzumyan	Light Welterweight (–64 kilograms)	Gold	
(United Kingdom) 2008 Liverpool	Tsolak Ananikyan	Heavyweight (–91 kilograms)	Silver	
(Russia) 2010 Moscow	Hovhannes Danielyan	Light Flyweight (–48 kilograms)	Bronze	
(Russia) 2010 Moscow	Hrachik Javakhyan	Light Welterweight (–64 kilograms)	Gold	
(Russia) 2010 Moscow	Artur Khachatryan	Light Heavyweight (–81 kilograms)	Bronze	
(Turkey) 2011 Ankara	Vladimir Saruhanyan	Lightweight (–60 kg)	Bronze	
(Belarus) 2013 Minsk	Aram Avagyan	Bantamweight (–56 kg)	Bronze	
(Bulgaria) 2015 Samokov	Aram Avagyan	Bantamweight (–56 kg)	Bronze	
(Ukraine) 2017 Kharkiv	Hovhannes Bachkov	light welterweight (–64 kg)	Gold	
(Belarus) 2019 Minsk	Arthur Hovhannisyan	light flyweight (–49 kg)	Gold	
(Belarus) 2019 Minsk	Karen Tonakanyan	lightweight (–60 kg)	Bronze	
(Belarus) 2019 Minsk	Hovhannes Bachkov	light welterweight (–64 kg)	Gold	
(Belarus) 2019 Minsk	Gor Nersesyan	light heavyweight (–81 kg)	Bronze	
(Armenia) 2022 Yerevan	Artur Bazeyan	featherweight (–57 kg)	Silver	
(Armenia) 2022 Yerevan	Hovhannes Bachkov	featherweight (–63.5 kg)	Gold	
(Armenia) 2022 Yerevan	Rafayel Hovhannisyan	cruiserweight (–86 kg)	Silver	
(Armenia) 2022 Yerevan	Narek Manasyan	heavyweight (–92 kg)	Bronze	

=== World Cup ===
Year	Athlete	Weight	Position	Ref
(Thailand) 1994 Bangkok	Nshan Munchyan	Light Flyweight (–48 kg)	Gold	
(China) 1998 Beijing	Vakhtang Darchinyan	Flyweight (–51 kg)	Bronze	
(China) 1998 Beijing	Aram Ramazyan	Bantamweight (–54 kg)	Bronze	
(China) 1998 Beijing	Artyom Simonyan	Featherweight (–57 kg)	Bronze	
(Russia) 2008 Moscow	Andranik Hakobyan	Middleweight (–75 kg)	Gold	
