= List of U.S. national Golden Gloves flyweight champions =

This is a list of United States national Golden Gloves champions in the flyweight division, along with the state or region they represented. The weight limit for flyweights was first contested at 112 lb (51 kg), but was increased to 114 lb (52 kg) in 2010.

- 1928 – Jimmy Chase – Chicago
- 1929 – Jimmy Chase – Chicago
- 1930 – Joe Espanoza – Chicago
- 1931 – Leo Rodak – Chicago
- 1932 – Albert Soukup – Chicago
- 1933 – Johnny Baltzer – Davenport
- 1934 – Jesse Levels – Cleveland
- 1935 – Patsy Urso – Detroit
- 1936 – Jackie Wilson – Cleveland
- 1937 – Jimmy Urso – Detroit
- 1938 – Kenny Lottman – Peoria
- 1939 – Vic Saccoia – Detroit
- 1940 – Harold Dade – Chicago
- 1941 – Harold Dade – Chicago
- 1942 – Henry Ulrich – Des Moines, Iowa
- 1943 – Barry Darby – Oklahoma City
- 1944 – Tom Nate – Gary, Indiana
- 1945 – Jackie Boyd – Chicago
- 1946 – Keith Nuttall – Kansas City
- 1947 – Robert Holliday – Cincinnati
- 1948 – Robert Holliday – Cincinnati
- 1949 – Arthur Brown – Kansas City
- 1950 – Nate Brooks – Cleveland
- 1951 – Pat Riley – Fort Worth
- 1952 – Kenneth Wright – Gary, Indiana
- 1953 – Pete Melendez – Fort Worth
- 1954 – Bernard Dean – St. Louis
- 1955 – Tommy Reynolds – St. Louis
- 1956 – Pete Melendez – Fort Worth
- 1957 – Jimmy Jackson – Minneapolis
- 1958 – Gil Yanez – Toledo
- 1959 – Gil Yanez – Toledo
- 1960 – Humberto Barrera – Robstown, Texas
- 1961 – Chico Marquez – Fort Worth
- 1962 – Ray Jutrus – Lowell, MA
- 1963 – Freddie Garcia – Roswell, NM
- 1964 – Donnie Broadway – Nashville
- 1965 – Rolland Miller – Minneapolis
- 1966 – Nickey Priola – Lafayette
- 1967 – Roland Miller – Minneapolis
- 1968 – Rudy Barrientes – Fort Worth
- 1969 – Tony Moreno – Fort Worth
- 1970 – Tony Moreno – Fort Worth
- 1971 – James Martinez – Fort Worth
- 1972 – Greg Lewis – Cincinnati
- 1973 – Miguel Ayala – Fort Worth
- 1974 – Greg Richardson – Cleveland
- 1975 – Leo Randolph – Rocky Mountain
- 1976 – Julio Rodrigues – Hawaii
- 1977 – Orlando Maldonado – Miami
- 1978 – William Johnson – Washington, D.C.
- 1979 – Jerome Coffee – Knoxville
- 1980 – Jerome Coffee – Knoxville
- 1981 – Ronnie Rentz – New Mexico
- 1982 – Jesse Benavidez – Fort Worth
- 1983 – Todd Hickman – Cleveland
- 1984 – Les Fabri – Las Vegas
- 1985 – Johnny Tapia – New Mexico
- 1986 – Anthony Wilson – Washington, DC
- 1987 – Carl Daniels – St. Louis
- 1988 – Jesse Medina – Rocky Mountain
- 1989 – Sandlanner Lewis – Florida
- 1990 – Timmy Austin – Cincinnati
- 1991 – Timmy Austin – Cincinnati
- 1992 – Aristead Clayton, Jr. – Louisiana
- 1993 – Carlos Navarro – So. California
- 1994 – Floyd Mayweather – Michigan
- 1995 – Kelly Wright – St. Louis
- 1996 – Luis Deines Pérez – Chicago
- 1997 – Roberto Benitez – Milwaukee
- 1998 – Gerald Tucker – Cincinnati
- 1999 – Robert Benitez – Wisconsin
- 2000 – Calvin Stewart –Atlanta, Ga
- 2001 – Francisco Rodriguez – .
- 2002 – Ron Siler – Cincinnati
- 2003 – Ron Siler – Cincinnati
- 2004 – Teon Kennedy – Pennsylvania
- 2005 – Barry Dennis – St. Louis
- 2006 – Aaron Alafa – California
- 2007 – Calvin Traxler – Grand Rapids, Michigan
- 2008 – Jorge Abiague – Portland, Maine
- 2009 – Louie Byrd – Denver, CO
- 2010 – Rau'shee Warren – Cincinnati
- 2011 – Louie Byrd – Denver, CO
- 2012 - Shawn Simpson - Chicago
- 2013 – Stephen Fulton – Philadelphia
- 2014 – Antonio Vargas – Houston
- 2015 - Antonio Vargas - Houston
- 2016 - Diego Alvarez - Utah
- 2017 - Derry Noble - California
