= Nonito Donaire vs. Guillermo Rigondeaux =

Boxing match

- Date: April 13, 2013
- Venue: Radio City Music Hall, New York, New York, U.S.
- Title(s) on the line: WBA (Super), WBO, The Ring and TBRB super bantamweight titles

Tale of the tape
Boxer	Nonito Donaire	Guillermo Rigondeaux
Nickname	The Filipino Flash	El Chacal ("The Jackal")
Hometown	Talibon, Bohol, Philippines	Santiago de Cuba, Cuba
Purse	$1,320,000	$750,000
Pre-fight record	31–1 (20 KO)	11–0 (8 KO)
Age	30 years, 4 months	32 years, 6 months
Height	5 ft 5 1/2 in (166 cm)	5 ft 4 1/2 in (164 cm)
Weight	121 1/2 lb (55 kg)	121 1/2 lb (55 kg)
Style	Orthodox	Southpaw
Recognition	WBO, The Ring and TBRB; Super Bantamweight Champion; The Ring No. 5 ranked pound-for-pound fighter 3-division world champion	WBA (Super); Super Bantamweight Champion; The Ring/TBRB; No. 1 Ranked Junior Featherweight

Result
- Rigondeaux wins via 12-round unanimous decision (114-113, 115-112, 116-111)

Nonito Donaire vs. Guillermo Rigondeaux was a super bantamweight professional boxing match contested between WBO and The Ring champion Nonito Donaire and WBA (Super) champion Guillermo Rigondeaux. The bout took place at Radio City Music Hall in New York City on April 13, 2013, and was televised on HBO. Entering the bout, Donaire had a record of 31–1 and had made three successful defenses of the WBO title he had won by defeating Wilfredo Vazquez, Jr. Rigondeaux, meanwhile, was undefeated in his eleven fights and was fighting for the fourth time as champion; he won the WBA interim title by defeating Ricardo Cordoba in November 2010 and defeated Rico Ramos to become official champion in January 2012.

Rigondeaux defeated Donaire by unanimous decision to remain undefeated. Donaire had not lost since his second professional fight.

== Background ==
=== Donaire ===
Donaire entered the fight on a 30-bout winning streak and had recently knocked out Jorge Arce to retain both the WBO (His third defense of the title) and The Ring Super Bantamweight championships.

=== Rigondeaux ===
Rigondeaux entered the fight undefeated in his professional career on an 11-bout winning streak. He had recently defeated Roberto Marroquin to retain the WBA Super World Super Bantamweight championship, his second defense of the title. Out of all his 11 victories, he had won 8 of them by knockout.

== The fight ==
Donaire scored a knockdown in the tenth with a straight left hand, but nevertheless he lost a unanimous decision with scores of 116–111, 115–112 and 114–113. HBO's unofficial scorer Harold Lederman scored it 118–109 and ESPN's Dan Rafael had it 114–113 both for Rigondeaux.

== Undercard ==
=== Televised ===
- Super Bantamweight Unified Championship bout: (Philippines) Nonito Donaire (c) vs. (Cuba) Guillermo Rigondeaux (c)

Rigondeaux defeated Donaire via Unanimous Decision (116-111, 115-112, 114-113).

=== Preliminary card ===
Confirmed bouts:

- Welterweight bout: (Canada) Mikaël Zewski vs. (Puerto Rico) Daniel Sostre

Zewski defeated Sostre via KO at 0:49 of the second round.

- Light Heavyweight bout: (United States) Sean Monaghan vs. (United States) Dion Stanley

Monaghan defeated Stanley via TKO at 1:51 of the first round.

- Super Welterweight bout: (United States) Glen Tapia vs. (Dominican Republic) Joseph De los Santos

Tapia defeated los Santos via Unanimous Decision (80-72. 80-72, 80-72).

- Super Middleweight bout: (United States) Jesse Hart vs. (United States) Marlon Farr

Hart defeated Farr via TKO at 1:33 of the third round.

- Super Featherweight bout: (Puerto Rico) Félix Verdejo vs. (United States) Steve Gutierrez

Verdejo defeated Gutierrez via TKO at 1:51 of the first round.

- Super Featherweight bout: (United States) Toka Kahn Clary vs. (Puerto Rico) Gadiel Andaluz

Clary defeated Andaluz via TKO at 1:32 of the first round.

- Welterweight bout: (United States) Dario Socci vs. (United States) Tyler Canning

Canning defeated Socci via Split Decision (39-37, 37-39, 39-37).

- Super Featherweight bout: (United States) Erick De Leon vs. (United States) Diamond Baier

De Leon defeated Baier via Unanimous Decision (40-36, 40-34, 40-36).

== Reported fight earnings ==
- Nonito Donaire $1,320,000 vs. Guillermo Rigondeaux $750,000

== International Broadcasting ==
Country / Region	Broadcaster
Australia	Main Event
Hungary	Sport 1
Norway	Viasat Sport
Philippines	ABS-CBN and Studio 23
Sweden	TV 10
USA	HBO

Preceded by vs. Jorge Arce	Nonito Donaire's bouts April 13, 2013	Succeeded by vs. Vic Darchinyan
Preceded by vs. Roberto Marroquin	Guillermo Rigondeaux's bouts April 13, 2013	Succeeded by vs. Joseph Agbeko
