= Kim Won-il (disambiguation) =

Kim Won-il (born 1942) is a South Korean writer.

Kim Won-il may also refer to:

- Kim Won-il (boxer) (born 1982), South Korean boxer
- Kim Won-il (footballer) (born 1986), South Korean footballer
