= Tsujimoto =

Tsujimoto (written: 辻本 or 辻元) is a Japanese surname. Notable people with the surname include:

- Kazumasa Tsujimoto (辻本 和正, born 1975), Japanese boxer
- Kenzo Tsujimoto (辻本憲三, born 1940), Japanese businessman
- Kiyomi Tsujimoto (辻元 清美, born 1960), Japanese politician
- Shigeki Tsujimoto (辻本 茂輝, born 1979), Japanese footballer
- Tatsunori Tsujimoto (辻本達規, born 1991), Japanese actor and musical artist
- Yasushi Tsujimoto (辻本 恭史, born 1982), Japanese professional wrestler

== Fictional characters ==
- Natsumi Tsujimoto (辻本 夏実), a character in the Japanese manga series You're Under Arrest
- Taro Tsujimoto (辻本 太郎), a fictional Japanese ice hockey player
