= Zemzemi (surname) =

Zemzemi is a surname. Notable people with the surname include:

- Moataz Zemzemi (born 1999), Tunisian footballer
- Moez Zemzemi (born 1975), Tunisian boxer
- Mohamed Zemzemi (born 1991), Tunisian athlete

== See also ==
- Zemzem (name)
