= Manny Pacquiao vs. Antonio Margarito =

2010 boxing match

The Eighth Wonder of the World
- Date: November 13, 2010
- Venue: AT&T Stadium, Arlington, Texas, U.S.
- Title on the line: vacant WBC super welterweight title

Tale of the tape
Boxer	Manny Pacquiao	Antonio Margarito
Nickname	"Pac-Man"	El Tornado de Tijuana ("The Tijuana Tornado")
Hometown	General Santos, Soccsksargen, Philippines	San Diego, California, U.S.
Purse	$15,000,000	
Pre-fight record	51–3–2 (38 KO)	38–6 (27 KO)
Age	31 years, 10 months	32 years, 7 months
Height	5 ft 6 1/2 in (169 cm)	5 ft 11 in (180 cm)
Weight	144.6 lb (66 kg)	150 lb (68 kg)
Style	Southpaw	Orthodox
Recognition	WBO; Welterweight Champion; The Ring; No. 2 Ranked Welterweight; The Ring No. 1 ranked pound-for-pound fighter 7-division world champion	WBC; No. 1 Ranked Super Welterweight; WBC International super welterweight champion 3-time welterweight champion

Result
- Pacquiao wins via 12-round unanimous decision (120-108, 118-110, 119-109)

Manny Pacquiao vs. Antonio Margarito, billed as The Eighth Wonder of the World, was a professional boxing match contested on November 13, 2010, for the vacant WBC super welterweight championship.

== Background ==
The bout was held at AT&T Stadium, in Arlington, Texas, United States. The match was put together after the second negotiation for the fight between Manny Pacquiao and Floyd Mayweather Jr. had failed. Pacquiao defeated Margarito by unanimous decision.

== The fight ==
Despite his smaller size (5'6 1/2" vs Margarito's 5'11") and lower weight (144.6 lbs vs. Margarito's 150 lbs) Pacquiao hammered Margarito with his superior speed and technique. Margarito sustained three cuts, prompting Pacquiao to ask the referee, Laurence Cole, to stop the fight. Ringside commentators agreed as well that the fight should have been stopped.

The fight went the distance with Pacquiao winning via unanimous decision over Margarito. Pacquiao almost knocked out Margarito in the 4th round with a left hook to the body and in the 6th round Margarito connected a solid left hook to the body that sent Pacquiao into the ropes, which was the closest Margarito came to pressing Pacquiao. Judges' scores were Juergen Langos 120–108, Glen Rick Crocker 118–110, and Oren Shellenberger 119–109 in favor of Pacquiao. Pacquiao landed 474 out of 1069 punches (44%) while Margarito landed 229 out of 817 (28%). Out of those punches Pacquiao landed 411/713 power punches thrown (58%) while Margarito landed 135 out of 312 (43%).

== Aftermath ==
Due to his injuries, Margarito's post-fight interview was skipped and he was sent directly to the hospital after the fight. Margarito had to undergo surgery as it was discovered that his right orbital bone had been fractured.

In the post-fight interview, Pacquiao was asked if he held back during the last round, and Pacquiao said he just let the 3 minutes run out and that "Boxing is not for killing". Pacquiao also stated "I did not want to damage him permanently." It would turn out, unfortunately, that the fight did leave permanent damage to the right eye of Margarito. This eye almost lost him his license to fight upon a medical inspection. During Margarito's next bout against Miguel Cotto, his eye suffered severe swelling and caused him to lose the bout via doctor/referee stoppage.

The fight generated 1.15 million buys and 64 million dollars in revenue and the attendance was 41,734.

== Undercard ==
Confirmed bouts:

=== Televised ===
- Super Welterweight bout: (Philippines) Manny Pacquiao vs. (Mexico) Antonio Margarito

Pacquiao defeated Margarito via unanimous decision (120–108, 118–110, 119–109).

- Welterweight bout: (Mexico) Jesus Soto Karass vs. (United States) Mike Jones

Jones defeated Karass via majority decision (97–93, 95–94, 94–94).

- Super Bantamweight bout: (Cuba) Guillermo Rigondeaux vs. (Panama) Ricardo Cordoba

Rigondeaux defeated Cordoba via split decision (117–109, 114–112, 112–114).

- Lightweight bout: (United States) Brandon Rios vs. (United States) Omri Lowther

Rios defeated Lowther via TKO at 2:35 of fifth round.

==== Televised free ====
- Featherweight bout: (United States) Roberto Marroquin vs. (Mexico) Francisco Dominguez

Marroquin defeated Dominguez via knockout at 1:27 of first round.

- Light Welterweight bout: (United States) José Benavidez vs. (United States) Winston Mathis

Benavidez defeated Mathis via knockout at 2:23 of third round.

- Light Heavyweight bout: (United States) Mike Lee vs. (United States) Keith Debow

Lee defeated Debow via knockout at 1:33 of first round.

- Light Welterweight bout: (Mexico) Oscar Meza vs. (United States) Jose Hernandez

Meza defeated Hernandez via unanimous decision (38–37, 38–37, 39–36).

- Flyweight bout: (Philippines) Richie Mepranum vs. (United States) Anthony Villarreal

Mepranum defeated Villarreal via split decision.

- Lightweight bout: (Philippines) Juan Martin Elorde vs. (Mexico) Angel Rodriguez

Rodriguez defeated Elorde via unanimous decision (40–36, 40–36, 39–37).

- Welterweight bout: (Philippines) Dennis Laurente vs. (United States) Rashad Holloway

Laurente defeated Holloway via unanimous decision (77–75, 79–73, 78–74).

== International broadcasting ==
Country	Broadcaster
Australia	Main Event
Brazil	Combate
Canada	Viewers Choice
Colombia	Golden
Czech Republic	Sport 1
Denmark	TV2 Sport
Hungary	Sport 2
Indonesia	TvOne
Italy	Dahlia TV
Japan	WOWOW
Mexico	TV Azteca
New Zealand	SKY Box Office 200
Philippines	GMA, Solar TV, (free to air, some cases delayed); Solar Sports, (cable, delayed) Solar All Access (PPV, Live)
Poland	Polsat Sport Extra
Qatar	Al Jazeera Sports 1
Romania	Digi Sport
Russia	NTV Plus Sport
Slovakia	Sport 1
Spain	MARCA TV
South Africa	SuperSport 6
Thailand	BBTV
United Kingdom	Sky Sports 1
United States	HBO PPV (Main Card); ESPN3.com (Undercard)
Venezuela	Meridiano

Preceded by vs. Joshua Clottey	Manny Pacquiao's bouts 13 November 2010	Succeeded by vs. Shane Mosley
Preceded by vs. Roberto Garcia	Antonio Margarito's bouts 13 November 2010	Succeeded by vs. Miguel Cotto II
