= Blidy =

Blida, (Arabic: لبليدة, Cyrillic Блида) is a surname used internationally. Depending upon transliteration to English from other languages, the name has various meanings, and families with this surname are not necessarily related to each other.

The name Blida is a diminutive of the Arabic word belda, city.

Alternate English spellings of this surname are:

Blidy, Blidi, Blidiy

The surname can indicate family origin, i.e. Blida, Algeria, (a city in Algeria, southwest of Algiers), or Blida, Lebanon (a town in Nabatîyé, 81 km south of the capital city, Beirut).

== Notable people with this surname ==
- Barbara Blida (1949–2007), Polish politician
- Hichem Blida (born 1974), Algerian boxer
