= Brandun Lee =

American boxer (born 1999)

Personal information
- Nationality: American; (Note: According to Mexican nationality law as denoted in the Constitution of Mexico, people born abroad from a Mexican Citizen are Mexican nationals at birth, therefore Lee has Mexican nationality.)
- Born: April 25, 1999 (age 27) Yuba City, California, U.S.
- Height: 5 ft 10 in (177.8 cm)

Boxing career
- Weight class: Light welterweight
- Reach: 71 in (180 cm)
- Stance: Orthodox

Boxing record
- Total fights: 31
- Wins: 30
- Win by KO: 23
- Losses: 1
Medal record
Men's amateur boxing
Representing United States
US National PAL Championships
Gold medal – first place	2014 Oxnard	Welterweight

Brandun Lee (born April 25, 1999) is an American professional boxer who held the IBO Inter-Continental super lightweight title in 2021.

== Early life ==
Lee was born and raised in Yuba City, California to a North Korean-born father and a Mexican mother. He lived there for about 12 years and then moved to the Coachella Valley. He attended La Quinta High School, and played soccer and ran track as a youngster. Lee faced racial prejudice growing up because of his Korean descent: he says other people would "stereotype a lot and look at my eyes and think Chinese", and "people thought that because I was Asian that I couldn't fight. We would come down to Southern California and they would say, “We want the little Chinito” which meant they wanted the “Chinese” kid".

== Amateur career ==
Lee started boxing at around six years old, and had his first amateur fight at age eight. He won four Junior Golden Gloves Championships, the Junior Silver Gloves three times and the Junior PAL five times. He was due to represent the U.S. in Saint Petersburg, Russia, but his parents refused to let him skip school in order to participate. Lee amassed an impressive amateur record of 181–9.

== Professional career ==
Lee signed a professional contract with manager Cameron Dunkin in the fall of 2016 and debuted shortly afterward at age 17 the next year while he was still in high school. He has been trained by his father Bobby Lee "since day one". After compiling a perfect 21–0 record, he captured the vacant IBO Inter-Continental super lightweight title on March 10, 2021, when he defeated Samuel Teah (17–3–1) by third-round knockout at the Mohegan Sun Arena in Uncasville, Connecticut.

In his next fight, Lee fought for the first time professionally in his home state of California, against Ezequiel Victor Fernandez (28–4–1) on the undercard of John Riel Casimero vs. Guillermo Rigondeaux on August 14, 2021. Lee made quick work of his opponent, knocking Fernandez down three times in the first 100 seconds of the fight. The fight was waved off after the third knockdown, extending Lee's consecutive knockout victory streak to fourteen in a row.

After 30 successive wins, Lee suffered his first defeat as a professional against Cain Sandoval at The Cosmopolitan in Las Vegas, Nevada, on June 28, 2026, going down by majority decision over 10 rounds with two of the ringside judges scoring the fight 97–93 and 96–94 for his opponent, while the third had it a 95–95 draw.

== Personal life ==
Lee was named after Bruce Lee's son, Brandon Lee, because his father was a fan of the martial artist. He has one older brother, whom he calls his "role model".

Unusual for a professional boxer, Lee is a full-time college student, having obtained an Associates of Arts degree at College of the Desert, before transferring to California State University, San Bernardino with the aim of earning a bachelor's degree in criminal justice. He has further plans to obtain a master's degree in business.

He is largely a monolingual English speaker, stating that he does not speak Korean. Regarding his Spanish proficiency, he admits that he "can't carry on a conversation but I can speak some words here and there".

Lee has named Mike Tyson, Felix Trinidad, Floyd Mayweather Jr., Gennady Golovkin and Vasyl Lomachenko as his boxing influences, and is a longtime friend of fellow American boxer Jaron Ennis.

His favorite Korean food is bulgogi.

== Professional boxing record ==
31 fights	30 wins	1 loss
By knockout	23	0
By decision	7	1

No.	Result	Record	Opponent	Type	Round, time	Date	Location	Notes
31	Loss	30–1	Cain Sandoval	MD	10	Jun 28, 2026	The Cosmopolitan, Las Vegas, Nevada, U.S	
30	Win	30–0	Elias Damian Araujo	UD	8	Jun 21, 2025	New Jersey, Newark, Prudential Center	
29	Win	29–0	Juan Anacona	PTS	8	Jul 27, 2024	The O2 Arena, London, England	
28	Win	28–0	Pedro Campa	UD	10	Apr 8, 2023	Dignity Health Sports Park, Carson, California, U.S.	
27	Win	27–0	Diego Gonzalo Luque	KO	4 (8) 2:55	Jan 7, 2023	Capital One Arena, Washington District of Columbia, U.S.	
26	Win	26–0	Will Madera	UD	10	Aug 20, 2022	Hard Rock Live, Hollywood, Florida, U.S.	
25	Win	25–0	Zachary Ochoa	UD	10	Apr 16, 2022	AT&T Stadium, Arlington, Texas, U.S.	
24	Win	24–0	Juan Heraldez	KO	7 (10), 2:11	Dec 11, 2021	Dignity Health Sports Park, Carson, California, U.S.	
23	Win	23–0	Ezequiel Victor Fernandez	KO	1 (8), 1:40	Aug 14, 2021	Dignity Health Sports Park, Carson, California, U.S.	
22	Win	22–0	Samuel Teah	KO	3 (10), 1:43	Mar 10, 2021	Mohegan Sun Arena, Uncasville, Connecticut, U.S.	Won vacant IBO Inter-Continental light welterweight title
21	Win	21–0	Dakota Linger	TKO	3 (10), 1:17	Dec 19, 2020	Mohegan Sun Arena, Uncasville, Connecticut, U.S.	
20	Win	20–0	Jimmy Williams	KO	1 (8), 1:34	Oct 7, 2020	Mohegan Sun Arena, Uncasville, Connecticut, U.S.	
19	Win	19–0	Camilo Prieto	TKO	3 (10), 2:34	Mar 13, 2020	Grand Casino, Hinckley, Minnesota, U.S.	
18	Win	18–0	Miguel Zamudio	TKO	1 (6), 2:11	Jan 17, 2020	WinnaVegas Casino & Resort, Sloan, Iowa, U.S.	
17	Win	17–0	Milton Arauz	KO	2 (8), 2:59	Sep 20, 2019	La Hacienda Event Center, Midland, Texas, U.S.	
16	Win	16–0	Francisco Medel	TKO	1 (6), 0:31	Aug 23, 2019	Central Park Community Center, Broken Arrow, Oklahoma, U.S.	
15	Win	15–0	Dario Medina	TKO	1 (4), 0:38	Jun 29, 2019	Bosque de la Ciudad, San Luis Rio Colorado, Mexico	
14	Win	14–0	Sergio Muro	TKO	1 (4), 1:37	Apr 27, 2019	Gimnasio Municipal, San Luis Rio Colorado, Mexico	
13	Win	13–0	Luis Cueto	TKO	1 (4), 0:50	Feb 9, 2019	Gimnasio Municipal, San Luis Rio Colorado, Mexico	
12	Win	12–0	Pablo Batres	KO	1 (6), 2:14	Sep 29, 2018	Arabia Shrine Center, Houston, Texas, U.S.	
11	Win	11–0	Jorge Luis Munguia	TKO	1 (6), 0:56	Sep 2, 2018	Mountaineer Casino Ballroom, New Cumberland, West Virginia, U.S.	
10	Win	10–0	Rey Trujillo	KO	2 (4), 2:39	Jun 22, 2018	Humble Civic Center, Humble, Texas, U.S.	
9	Win	9–0	Stephon McIntyre	UD	4	May 19, 2018	RiverCenter, Davenport, Iowa, U.S.	
8	Win	8–0	Matt Murphy	RTD	3 (4), 3:00	Feb 23, 2018	Derby Park Expo, Louisville, Kentucky, U.S.	
7	Win	7–0	Kevin Mario Cooper	TKO	1 (4), 1:20	Dec 15, 2017	Riverside Epicenter, Austell, Georgia, U.S.	
6	Win	6–0	Anthony Crowder	KO	1 (4), 1:02	Sep 23, 2017	National Guard Armory, Hammond, Indiana, U.S.	
5	Win	5–0	Roy Garcia	TKO	2 (4), 1:23	Aug 12, 2017	Howard Theatre, Washington, D.C., U.S.	
4	Win	4–0	Donovain Battle	UD	4	Jul 29, 2017	CenterStage@NoDa, Charlotte, North Carolina, U.S.	
3	Win	3–0	Jack Grady	TKO	3 (4), 1:20	Jun 1, 2017	Camelback Resort, Scottsdale, Arizona, U.S.	
2	Win	2–0	Seth Basler	TKO	1 (4), 2:12	Mar 31, 2017	2300 Arena, Philadelphia, Pennsylvania, U.S.	
1	Win	1–0	Christopher Johnson	KO	1 (4), 1:33	Jan 28, 2017	2300 Arena, Philadelphia, Pennsylvania, U.S.	
