= Francisco Rodriguez (boxer, born 1984) =

Mexican boxer (1984–2009)

Francisco "Paco" Rodríguez
Personal information
- Nicknames: Paco, El Niño muy grande
- Born: Francisco Rodríguez; June 15, 1984 Guadalajara, Jalisco, Mexico
- Died: November 22, 2009 (aged 25)
- Height: 1.65 m (5 ft 5 in)
- Weight: Super bantamweight

Boxing career
- Reach: 174 cm (69 in)
- Stance: Orthodox

Boxing record
- Total fights: 17
- Wins: 14
- Win by KO: 8
- Losses: 3
- Draws: 0
- No contests: 0

This is about a Mexican boxer. For the Venezuelan boxer with this name, see Francisco Rodríguez (boxer, born 1945)

Francisco "Paco" Rodríguez (June 15, 1984 – November 22, 2009) was a Mexican professional boxer in the Super Bantamweight division.

== Amateur career ==
Francisco's amateur boxing career included five wins at the regional Chicago Golden Gloves and a win at the 2001 National Golden Gloves Championships.

== Professional career ==
Rodríguez became a professional boxer in January 2005. Known as "El Nino Azteca", Rodríguez was a fan favourite, especially in the Chicago, Illinois area.

=== Death ===
Rodríguez died at the age of 25 after losing a bout against undefeated prospect Teon Kennedy. After the match referee stopped the fight in the 10th round, Rodríguez immediately collapsed, losing consciousness while waiting for an official decision. He was rushed to a hospital for emergency brain surgery and died 2 days later. Rodriguez was 14–2 going into the bout against Kennedy for the vacant USBA Super Bantamweight title.

== Legacy ==
After Paco's death, his family were asked by the Gift of Life donor program to donate his organs, including both kidneys, pancreas, lungs, and his heart. Paco was featured on ESPN program E:60, where his brother Alex said, "I would think he'd be disappointed to see all the hard work he did to keep his body in the shape that he kept it, his heart, to let it stop beating. I think, we should give someone else a chance." The donations saved several lives including that of Paco's uncle Ramon and Victoria Davis. Other recipients included Ashley Owens, Alexis Sloan, and Meagan Kingsley. They had the opportunity to meet Paco's family. Paco's wife Sonia told them, "it's a shame that he's not here, but what happened didn't happen in vain. You guys...it was meant to happen, for you guys to receive this gift. So, you know, enjoy it to the fullest just like he did when he had it all."
