= Hassan Oucheikh =

Moroccan boxer

Personal information
- Nationality: Moroccan
- Born: 1 January 1976 (age 49)

Sport
- Sport: Boxing

Hassan Oucheikh (born 1 January 1976) is a Moroccan boxer. He competed in the men's bantamweight event at the 2000 Summer Olympics.
