= Guillermo Rigondeaux vs. John Riel Casimero =

Boxing match

John Riel Casimero vs. Guillermo Rigondeaux
- Date: August 14, 2021
- Venue: Dignity Health Sports Park, Carson, California, U.S.
- Title(s) on the line: WBO bantamweight title

Tale of the tape
| Boxer | John Riel Casimero | Guillermo Rigondeaux |
| Nickname | Quadro Alas' "(Four Aces)" | El Chacal "(The Jackal)" |
| Hometown | Ormoc City, Leyte, Philippines | Santiago de Cuba, Santiago de Cuba Province, Cuba |
| Purse | $175,000 | $200,000 |
| Pre-fight record | 30–4 (21 KOs) | 20–1 (1) (13 KO) |
| Age | 32 years, 6 months | 40 years, 10 months |
| Height | 5 ft 3 in (160 cm) | 5 ft 4 in (163 cm) |
| Weight | 118 lb (54 kg) | 117 lb (53 kg) |
| Style | Orthodox | Southpaw |
| Recognition | WBO; Bantamweight Champion; 3-division world champion | WBO; No. 4 Ranked Bantamweight; 2-division world champion |

Result
- Casimero wins by Split decision (113–115, 116–112, 117–111)

John Riel Casimero vs. Guillermo Rigondeaux, was a professional boxing match contested on August 14, 2021, for the WBO bantamweight championship.

== Background ==
In April 2021 it was announced that Casimero would defend his Bantamweight title against two-time Olympic gold medalist and 2-division world champion Guillermo Rigondeaux. On June 19, however he was replaced by WBC champion Nonito Donaire, with Rigondeaux likely to face an opponent undercard. However after the fight between Casimero and Donaire fell apart over insults directed at Donaire's wife, Rigondeaux stepped back in to fight Casimero as had been originally planned.

The bout took place at the Dignity Health Sports Park, Carson, California U.S.

== The fight ==
In an extremely uneventful bout, Casimero pressured his opponent all night, fighting on the front foot and throwing more punches than Rigondeaux, who was reluctant to engage. Casimero would edge out Rigondeaux via split decision. The official judges scored the fight 113–115, 116–112, and 117–111.

CompuBox claimed that the two boxers landed only a combined 91 punches, the lowest total for a 12-round fight in CompuBox's 36-year history, with Casimero landing 47 of 297 (15.8%) and Rigondeaux 44 of 221 (19.9%).

=== Official scorecards ===
| Judge | Fighter | 1 | 2 | 3 | 4 | 5 | 6 | 7 | 8 | 9 | 10 | 11 | 12 | Total |
|---|---|---|---|---|---|---|---|---|---|---|---|---|---|---|
| Tim Cheatham | Rigondeaux | 9 | 10 | 10 | 10 | 9 | 10 | 10 | 9 | 9 | 10 | 9 | 10 | 115 |
| Tim Cheatham | Casimero | 10 | 9 | 9 | 9 | 10 | 9 | 9 | 10 | 10 | 9 | 10 | 9 | 113 |
| Robert Hoyle | Rigondeaux | 9 | 9 | 10 | 9 | 9 | 10 | 10 | 9 | 9 | 9 | 9 | 9 | 111 |
| Robert Hoyle | Casimero | 10 | 10 | 9 | 10 | 10 | 9 | 9 | 10 | 10 | 10 | 10 | 10 | 117 |
| David Sutherland | Rigondeaux | 9 | 10 | 10 | 10 | 9 | 9 | 9 | 9 | 9 | 10 | 9 | 9 | 112 |
| David Sutherland | Casimero | 10 | 9 | 9 | 9 | 10 | 10 | 10 | 10 | 10 | 9 | 10 | 10 | 116 |

== Aftermath ==
In his post-fight interview, Casimero criticized his opponent's extremely passive gameplan, saying "I'm focused on [the] knockout, but Rigondeaux always runs. Rigondeaux just always runs. No fighting." He continued by reaffirming that it is his intention to unify the bantamweight division, targeting the division's other titleholders, Donaire and Naoya Inoue. Casimero concluded his interview by issuing the middle finger to Inoue.

The previous record was held by the Mario Barrios-Devis Boschiero lightweight bout held in 2016 in New Jersey were the two fighters landed a combined 100 punches.

== Fight card ==
Confirmed bouts:

Main card
| Weight class | | | | Method | Round | Time | Notes |
|---|---|---|---|---|---|---|---|
| Bantamweight | John Riel Casimero (c) | def. | Guillermo Rigondeaux | SD | 12/12 | | (Note: For WBO Bantamweight title) |
| Bantamweight | Gary Antonio Russell | vs. | Emmanuel Rodríguez | NC-ND | 1/12 | 0:16 | (Note: Accidental headbutt - Rodriguez cannot continue due to injury.) |
| Bantamweight | Rau'shee Warren | def. | Damien Vázquez | KO | 2/10 | 2:55 |
Undercard
| Super lightweight | Brandun Lee | def. | Ezequil Victor Fernandez | KO | 1/8 | 1:40 |
| Bantamweight | Juan Carlos Payano | def. | Raymond Tabugon | RTD | 5/8 | 3:00 |
| Middleweight | Alan Emmanuel Castano | def. | Christian Aguirre | TKO | 3/6 | 0:53 |
| Bantamweight | Jonas Sultan | def. | Sharone Carter | TKO | 7/8 | 2:29 |
| Middleweight | Benjamin Stanoff | def. | Maycon Oller Da Silva | UD | 4/4 |

== Broadcasting ==
| Country / Region | Broadcaster |
|---|---|
| Canada | TSN |
| United States | Showtime |

| Preceded by vs. Duke Micah | John Riel Casimero's bouts 14 August 2021 | Succeeded by vs. Ryo Akaho |
| Preceded by vs. Liborio Solís | Guillermo Rigondeaux's bouts 14 August 2021 | Succeeded by vs. Vincent Astrolabio |
