= Riaz Durgahed =

Mauritian boxer (born 1977)

Personal information
- Nationality: Mauritian
- Born: 4 May 1977 (age 48)

Sport
- Sport: Boxing

Riaz Durgahed (born 4 May 1977) is a Mauritian boxer. He competed in the men's bantamweight event at the 2000 Summer Olympics.
