= Kim Won-il (boxer) =

South Korean boxer (born 1982)

Personal information
- Full name: 김원일
- Nationality: South Korea
- Born: January 3, 1982 (age 44)
- Height: 1.65 m (5 ft 5 in)
- Weight: 54 kg (119 lb)

Sport
- Sport: Boxing
- Weight class: Bantamweight
Medal record
Asian Games
Gold medal – first place	2002 Busan	Bantamweight
Asian Championships
Bronze medal – third place	2004 Puerto Princesa	Bantamweight

Kim Won-il (born January 3, 1982) is a South Korean boxer best known for winning the gold medal in the men's bantamweight division at the Asian Games 2002.

In 2002 he bested Abdusalom Khasanov and Bekzod Khidirov in the final.

At the 2004 Summer Olympics he lost his first match to eventual Thai runner up Worapoj Petchkoom.

At the 2005 World Championships he competed in the featherweight division, and lost his first bout to Dmytro Bulenkov (Ukraine).
