= Aram Ramazyan =

Armenian boxer

Personal information
- Full name: Արամ Ռամազյան
- Nationality: Armenia
- Born: December 6, 1978 (age 47) Yerevan, Armenian SSR, Soviet Union
- Height: 1.77 m (5 ft 10 in)
- Weight: 54 kg (119 lb)

Sport
- Sport: Boxing
- Weight class: Bantamweight
Medal record
World Amateur Championships
Bronze medal – third place	1997 Budapest	Bantamweight
European Amateur Championships
Bronze medal – third place	2000 Tampere	Bantamweight

Aram Ramazyan (Armenian: Արամ Ռամազյան, born December 6, 1978) is a retired amateur boxer from Armenia.

He represented his native country at the 2000 Summer Olympics in Sydney, Australia in the men's bantamweight (54 kg) division. He lost in the first round to Georgia's Theimuraz Khurtsilava. Ramazyan won a bronze medal at the 1997 World Amateur Boxing Championships in Budapest. The next year, Ramazyan won a bronze medal at the 1998 Boxing World Cup. He also won a bronze medal at the 2000 European Amateur Boxing Championships in Tampere.
