= Cain Sandoval =

American boxer (born 2002)

Personal information
- Nickname: Sugar
- Nationality: American
- Born: August 7, 2002 (age 24) Sacramento, California, U.S.
- Height: 5 ft 8 in (173 cm)
- Weight: Super Lightweight

Boxing career
- Stance: Orthodox

Boxing record
- Total fights: 19
- Wins: 18
- Win by KO: 15
- Losses: 1

Cain Sandoval (born August 7, 2002) is an American professional boxer who competes in the super lightweight division.

== Early life ==
Sandoval has revealed that he grew up surrounded by gang violence. He has said that boxing was a chance to leave to area and see that the violence he witnessed was not normal. His father, aunt and grandfathers were all boxers

== Amateur career ==
Sandoval had over 100 amateur fights.

== Professional career ==
Sandoval won the first 11 fights of his career by knockout. Sandovals biggest win of his career so far was against former Olympian Javier Molina. After the fight many fans were saying Sandoval was already a contender. After two decision wins Sandoval joined up with legendary trainer Freddie Roach. He headlined in Santa Ynez and stopped Filipino Mark Bernaldez in four rounds in February 2025.

== Professional boxing record ==
19 fights	18 wins	1 loss
By knockout	15	0
By decision	3	1

No.	Result	Record	Opponent	Type	Round, time	Date	Location	Notes
19	Win	18–1	Brandun Lee	MD	10	Jun 28, 2026	The Cosmopolitan, Las Vegas, Nevada, U.S	
18	Loss	17–1	Julian Rodriguez	UD	10	Jan 23, 2026	Meta Apex, Enterprise, Nevada, U.S.	
17	Win	17–0	Jino Rodrigo	KO	10 (10), 2:30	Oct 3, 2025	Chumash Casino, Santa Ynez, California, U.S	
16	Win	16–0	Jonathan Jose Eniz	KO	2 (10), 2:31	Jun 21, 2025	Chumash Casino, Santa Ynez, California, U.S	
15	Win	15–0	Mark Bernaldez	KO	4 (10), 0:34	Feb 21, 2025	Chumash Casino, Santa Ynez, California, U.S	
14	Win	14–0	Romero Duno	KO	6 (10), 1:59	Aug 31, 2024	Chumash Casino, Santa Ynez, California, U.S	
13	Win	13–0	Angel Rebollar	UD	10	Apr 20, 2024	Commerce Casino, Commerce, California, U.S	
12	Win	12–0	Javier Molina	UD	10	Feb 23, 2024	Chumash Casino, Santa Ynez, California, U.S	
11	Win	11–0	Wesley Ferrer	TKO	5 (8), 1:34	Nov 9, 2023	Madison Square Garden Theater, New York, New York, U.S	
10	Win	10–0	Jose Maruffo	KO	6 (8), 2:28	Jul 22, 2023	Chumash Casino, Santa Ynez, California, U.S	
9	Win	9–0	Jose Angulo	KO	5 (8), 2:34	Apr 14, 2023	Commerce Casino, Commerce, California, U.S	
8	Win	8–0	Pedro Angel Cruz	TKO	3 (6), 2:22	Feb 18, 2023	Cow Palace, Daly City, California, U.S	
7	Win	7–0	Edgar Ramirez	KO	1 (4), 3:00	Nov 5, 2022	Omega Products International, Sacramento, California, U.S	
6	Win	6–0	Daniel Evangelista Jr	KO	2 (6), 0:44	Aug 5, 2022	DoubleTree Hotel, Sacramento, California, U.S	
5	Win	5–0	David Minter	KO	1 (6), 2:20	May 13, 2022	DoubleTree Hotel, Sacramento, California, U.S	
4	Win	4–0	Edgar Garcia Bram	KO	2 (6), 1:34	Apr 14, 2022	The Hangar, Costa Mesa, California, U.S	
3	Win	3–0	Keith Carson	KO	1 (4), 2:39	Dec 2, 2021	The Hangar, Costa Mesa, California, U.S	
2	Win	2–0	Justin Cole	KO	1 (4), 1:03	Oct 7, 2021	The Hangar, Costa Mesa, California, U.S	
1	Win	1–0	Lucnor Disenrne	KO	1 (4), 1:03	Aug 26, 2021	The Hangar, Costa Mesa, California, U.S	
