= Zemzem (name) =

Zemzem is both a given name and a surname. Notable people with the name include:

- Zemzem Ahmed (born 1984), Ethiopian steeplechase runner and road runner
- Fevzi Zemzem (1941–2022), Turkish footballer

== See also ==
- Zemzemi (surname)
