= Mai Kangde =

Chinese boxer (born 1977)

Personal information
- Nationality: Chinese
- Born: 5 April 1977 (age 49) China

Sport
- Sport: Boxing
- Weight class: Flyweight, Bantamweight
Medal record
Asian Championships
Silver medal – second place	2002 Seremban	Flyweight

Mai Kangde (born 5 April 1977) is a Chinese boxer. He competed in the men's bantamweight event at the 2000 Summer Olympics. He was an Asian Games silver medalist in the flyweight event in 2002.
