= Armenian Boxing Federation =

Sporting Organization

Armenian Boxing Federation logo

The Armenian Boxing Federation (Armenian: Հայաստանի բռնցքամարտի ֆեդերացիա, romanized: Hayastani brrnts’k’amarti federats’ia), also known as the Boxing Federation of Armenia, is the regulating body of boxing in Armenia, governed by the Armenian Olympic Committee. The headquarters of the federation is located in Yerevan.

== History ==
The Federation's previous logo

The Federation was established in 1991 and is currently led by president Arthur Gorgyan. There are several professional and amateur boxing schools throughout Armenia. Armenian boxers have placed in the top 3 of various world and European championship competitions for various weight categories. Armenian boxers have participated in the Boxing World Cup.

The Armenian Boxing Federation is a full member of the European Boxing Confederation and the International Boxing Association.

During a meeting with the International Boxing Association president Umar Kremlyev, the Armenian Boxing Federation representatives stated, "Armenian boxing takes a new path of development. We need to have a full-fledged dialogue with the International Sports Association around the development prospects and hold international tournaments in our country. I guarantee the state support in this regard. We want to foster the partnership and make them more productive."

== See also ==
- Boxing in Armenia
- Sport in Armenia
