= Clarence Vinson =

American boxer

Personal information
- Born: July 10, 1978 (age 48) Washington, D.C.
Medal record
Men's boxing
Representing the United States
Olympic Games
Bronze medal – third place	2000 Sydney	Bantamweight

Clarence Adam Vinson (born July 10, 1978 in Washington, D.C.) is an American boxer. Nicknamed "Untouchable", Vinson won the bantamweight bronze medal at the 2000 Summer Olympics. In the semi-final bout, he was defeated 6-18 by Cuba's eventual gold medalist Guillermo Rigondeaux.

== Amateur career ==
Vinson was also the 1997 and 1998 United States amateur Flyweight champion and the 1999 United States Amateur Bantamweight champion.

=== Olympic results ===
- Defeated Rachid Bouaita (France) 9-2
- Defeated Talaybek Kadyraliev (Kyrgyzstan) 12-7
- Defeated George Olteanu (Romania) 26-19
- Lost to Guillermo Rigondeaux (Cuba) 6-18

== Pro career ==
Vinson began his professional career in 2001, compiling a record of 17-2-0. He lost against Heriberto Ruiz and a decision to Mexico's César Morales in 2004. He TKO'd Jose German Cruz (December 2006).
