= Brin-Jonathan Butler =

American film director

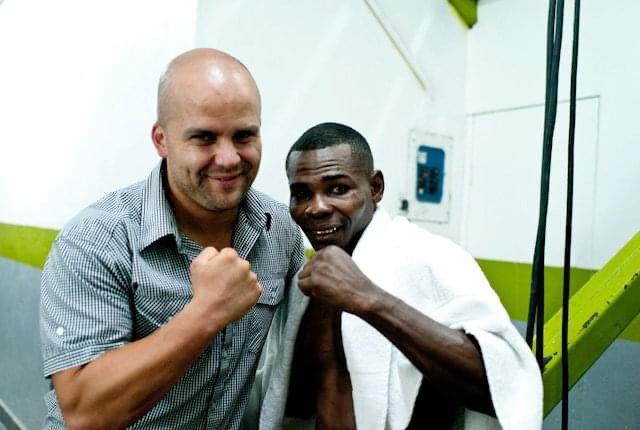
- Brin-Jonathan Butler (left) with Cuban boxer Guillermo Rigondeaux
- Born: 1979 (age 46–47)
- Occupation: Journalist

Brin-Jonathan Butler (born 1979) is a freelance journalist, Amazon interviewer, filmmaker and host of the podcast Tourist Information. His work has been published in The Classical, The Rumpus, Harper's, The Daily Beast, Vice, ESPN The Magazine, The Paris Review, The Huffington Post and Salon.com. His book A Cuban Boxer's Journey was published 2014. The Domino Diaries was published in 2015. The Grandmaster: Magnus Carlsen and the Match That Made Chess Great Again was published in 2018 and longlisted for the 2020 RBC Taylor Prize.

Butler has a forthcoming documentary film, Split Decision, examining Cuban–American relations.

== Publications ==
=== Books ===
A Cuban Boxer's Journey: Guillermo Rigondeaux, from Castro's Traitor to American Champion, 2014, Picador: a biography on Guillermo Rigondeaux

The Domino Diaries: My Decade Boxing with Olympic Champions and Chasing Hemingway's Ghost in the Last Days of Castro's Cuba, 2015, Picador: a memoir of time in Cuba living and training with Olympic boxing coaches. The Domino Diaries was on The Boston Globe's list of Best Books of 2015 and was shortlisted for the PEN/ESPN Award for Literary Sports Writing in 2016.

The Grandmaster: Magnus Carlsen and the Match That Made Chess Great Again, 2018, Simon & Schuster. Longlisted for the 2020 RBC Taylor Prize.

=== Kindle Singles ===
Errol Morris: The Kindle Singles Interview, 2015

Mike Tyson: The Kindle Singles Interview, 2014

=== Articles ===
ESPN

- What More Could Have Angulo Given Us?
- Donaire-Rigondeaux Full of Promises
- This Way Out: Inside the High Paced Underground Economy of Smuggling Champion Boxers
- Donaire-Rigondeaux Full of Promise

Salon

- Sparring with Mike Tyson
- The Way We Left Cuba
- Cuba's Forgotten Champ

SBNation

- Requiem for a Welterweight
- Training Pampered Motherfuckers: Eric Kelly Schools the 1%
- Gold in the Mud
- Hero's for Sale: The Agony of the Cuban Athlete
- After the Fall: 25 Years after Mike Tyson lost to Buster Douglas, why do we still have sympathy for the devil?
- "Mayweather vs Pacquiao: The Poison Oasis"

Vice

- The Horrors of Staying in Touch on Facebook

Aljazeera

- Hurricane Carter's Obituary
