= Hichem Blida =

Algerian boxer (born 1974)

Personal information
- Nationality: Algerian
- Born: 27 June 1974 (age 50)

Sport
- Sport: Boxing

Hichem Blida (born 27 June 1974) is an Algerian boxer. He competed in the men's bantamweight event at the 2000 Summer Olympics.
