= Jerome Coffee =

American boxer

Personal information
- Born: Edwin Jerome Coffee; March 16, 1958 (age 68) Nashville, Tennessee, U.S.
- Height: 5 ft 6 1/2 in (169 cm)
- Weight: Bantamweight

Boxing career
- Reach: 66 in (168 cm)
- Stance: Orthodox

Boxing record
- Total fights: 49
- Wins: 35
- Win by KO: 19
- Losses: 13
- Draws: 1
Medal record
Representing the United States
Pan American Games
Bronze medal – third place	1979 San Juan	Flyweight

Jerome "Kid" Coffee (born March 16, 1958) is an American former professional boxer in the bantamweight division.

== Amateur career ==
Coffee had an outstanding amateur career and won several national championships, Amateur record 205 fights 193 wins (or 185–8 by the May 5, 1980 estimate) including:

- 1977 National AAU Flyweight champion, decisioning Ronnie Clifford of Hickory Hills, Illinois, in the final.
- 1978 National PAL Flyweight champion
- 1979 National PAL Flyweight champion
- 1979 Pan American Games bronze medalist

- Defeated Gilberto Román (Mexico) points
- Defeated Jorge Hernández (Cuba) points
- Lost to Pedro Nolasco (Dominican Republic) points

- 1979 National Golden Gloves Flyweight champion

He was ranked #3 Flyweight amateur boxer in the world by the AIBA.

== Professional career ==
Coffee turned professional in 1980 and had great success. He won his first 26 bouts, leading up to a clash with Jeff Fenech for the IBF bantamweight title in 1985 in Sydney, Australia. Fenech retained his title over Coffee via unanimous decision after the bout went the full 15 rounds. Coffee retired in 1994.
