= César Morales (boxer) =

Mexican boxer (born 1978)

César Morales Velazquez (born March 4, 1978, in Ecatepec de Morelos) is a bantamweight boxer from Mexico, who represented his native country at the 2000 Summer Olympics in Sydney.

== Pro career ==
He made his debut as a pro in 2001, and captured the Vacant WBO Inter-Continental Bantamweight Title three years later by defeating Clarence Vinson of the United States. On July 28, 2006, he lost to Al Seeger in the fight for the IBA Super Bantamweight in Savannah, Georgia.
