= Aaron Alafa =

American boxer

Personal information
- Nationality: American
- Born: August 5, 1983 (age 42)
- Height: 5 ft 7 in (1.70 m)
- Weight: Bantamweight

Boxing career

Boxing record
- Total fights: 5
- Wins: 3
- Win by KO: 1
- Losses: 2
- Draws: 0
- No contests: 0

Aaron Alafa (born August 5, 1983) is an American professional boxer. He was born in Visalia, California. As an amateur boxer, Alafa won multiple championships before turing professional in 2008.

== Record ==
=== Amateur boxing: 37 fights 24 wins 0 KO 13 losses ===
Number	Date	Result	Round	Method	Opponent	Nationality	Note
37	November 17, 2007	Win	4R	SD	Carlos Narvaez		1st Annual World Golden Gloves Tournament
36	November 16, 2007	Win	4R	SD	Ashley Sexton		1st Annual World Golden Gloves Tournament
35	May 5, 2007	Win	4R	SD	Qa'id Muhammad		National Golden Gloves
34	May 4, 2007	Win	4R	SD	Joseph Francisco		National Golden Gloves
33	May 3, 2007	Win	4R	SD	John Franklin		National Golden Gloves
32	May 2, 2007	Win	4R	SD	Barry Dennis		National Golden Gloves
31	April 29, 2006	Win	4R	SD	Steven Huitt-Johnson		National Golden Gloves
30	April 28, 2006	Win	4R	SD	Barry Dennis		National Golden Gloves
29	April 27, 2006	Win	4R	SD	Mohammed Siddiqui		National Golden Gloves
28	April 25, 2006	Win	4R	SD	Bruno Escalante Jr.		National Golden Gloves
27	March 9, 2006	Loss	4R	SD	Oscar Venegas		U.S. Championships
26	March 8, 2006	Win	4R	SD	Bruno Escalante		U.S. Championships
25	???	Win	4R	RSCO	Jimmy Ceapa		
24	???	Loss	4R	SD	Qa-id Muhammad		
23	???	Loss	4R	SD	Rau'shee Warren		
22	???	Win	4R	SD	Bruno Escalante		
21	???	Win	4R	SD	David Gasper		
20	???	Loss	4R	DQ	Rau-shee Warren		
19	???	Win	4R	SD	John Franklin		
18	???	Win	4R	SD	Juan Leija		
17	???	Loss	4R	SD	Shawn Nichol		
16	???	Loss	4R	SD	Vincenzo Picardi		
15	???	Loss	4R	SD	Jorge Diaz Jr.		
14	???	Loss	3R	RSCO	Joseph Serrano		
13	???	Loss	4R	SD	Zhandos Zhumabekov		
12	???	Loss	4R	SD	OK Sung Lee		
11	???	Loss	4R	SD	Ron Siler		
10	???	Win	3R	RSCO	Brad Patraw		
09	???	Win	4R	SD	Jerry Pavich		
08	???	Win	4R	SD	Alton Jaurigui		
07	???	Win	4R	SD	Saul Gonzalez		
06	???	Win	4R	WO	Mark Davis		
05	???	Win	4R	SD	Charles Huerta		
04	???	Win	4R	SD	Raul Martinez		
03	???	Win	4R	SD	Ron Siler		
02	???	Win	4R	SD	Francisco Rodriguez		
01	???	Loss	2R	RSCO	Ron Siler		

=== Professional boxing: 5 fights, 3 wins, 1 KO, 2 losses ===
Number	Date	Result	Round	Method	Opponent	Nationality	Note
5	December 4, 2009	Lose	4R	SD	Jonathan Alcantara	USA	
4	October 22, 2009	Win	4R	SD	Danny Pantoja	USA	
3	April 23, 2009	Lose	4R	SD	Ephraim Martinez	USA	
2	August 21, 2008	Win	1R 0:19	KO	Greg McDowell	USA	
1	April 17, 2008	Win	4	SD	Harvey Phillipis	USA	Alafa's pro debut

== Career ==
=== Amateur ===
Alafa was highly decorated as an amateur. Some of his notable achievements include:

- 2001 National Golden Gloves Light flyweight champion
- 2002 United States Amateur Light flyweight champion
- 2006 National Golden Gloves flyweight champion
- 2007 National Golden Gloves flyweight champion

=== Professional ===
Alafa turned professional in 2008. He lost his third pro bout by decision. In December 2009 he lost his fifth pro bout, leaving him with a pro record of 3–2.

== See also ==
- List of male boxers

Preceded by Ron Siler	National Golden Gloves light flyweight winner 2001	Succeeded by Raytona Whitfield
