= Guillermo Rigondeaux =

Cuban boxer (born 1980)

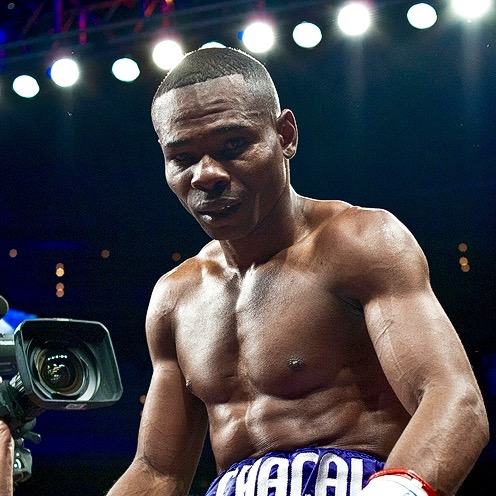
- Rigondeaux in 2012

Personal information
- Nicknames: El Chacal (The Jackal)
- Born: Guillermo Rigondeaux Ortiz; 30 September 1980 (age 46) Santiago de Cuba, Cuba
- Height: 5 ft 4 in (163 cm)
- Weight: Bantamweight; Super bantamweight; Super featherweight

Boxing career
- Reach: 67 1/2 in (171 cm)
- Stance: Southpaw

Boxing record
- Total fights: 28
- Wins: 24
- Win by KO: 16
- Losses: 3
- No contests: 1
Medal record
Men's amateur boxing
Representing Cuba
Olympic Games
Gold medal – first place	2000 Sydney	Bantamweight
Gold medal – first place	2004 Athens	Bantamweight
World Championships
Gold medal – first place	2001 Belfast	Bantamweight
Gold medal – first place	2005 Mianyang	Bantamweight
World Cup
Gold medal – first place	2002 Astana	Bantamweight
Gold medal – first place	2005 Moscow	Bantamweight
Gold medal – first place	2006 Baku	Bantamweight
Pan American Games
Gold medal – first place	2003 Santo Domingo	Bantamweight
Central American and Caribbean Games
Gold medal – first place	2006 Cartagena	Bantamweight
Goodwill Games
Gold medal – first place	2001 Brisbane	Bantamweight
Representing Santiago de Cuba
Cuban National Championships
Gold medal – first place	2000 Guantanamo	Bantamweight
Gold medal – first place	2001 Santiago de Cuba	Bantamweight
Gold medal – first place	2002 Las Tunas	Bantamweight
Gold medal – first place	2003 Holguin	Bantamweight
Gold medal – first place	2004 Camagüey	Bantamweight
Gold medal – first place	2005 Pinar del Rio	Bantamweight
Gold medal – first place	2006 Bayamo	Bantamweight

Guillermo Rigondeaux Ortiz (Spanish pronunciation: [ɡiˈʎeɾmo riɣonˈdo oɾˈtiθ]; born 30 September 1980) is a Cuban professional boxer, who held the unified WBA (Super), WBO and Ring magazine super bantamweight titles between 2013 and 2017, and the WBA (Regular) bantamweight title from 2020 to 2021.

As an amateur Rigondeaux won consecutive gold medals in the bantamweight division at the 2000 and 2004 Summer Olympics. He is also a seven-time Cuban national champion at bantamweight (2000–2006), finishing his amateur career with a record of about 475 fights with 12 losses.

Rigondeaux has been lauded by boxing trainer Freddie Roach as being "probably the greatest talent I've ever seen." He is known for his exceptionally fast hand speed, punching power, counterpunching abilities, athleticism, reflexes and footwork. He is widely considered one of the greatest defensive boxers of all time.

== Amateur career ==
=== Olympic results ===
2000

- Defeated Moez Zemzeni (Tunisia) KO 1
- Defeated Kazumasa Tsujimoto (Japan) RSC 3
- Defeated Agasi Agaguloglu (Azerbaijan) 14-5
- Defeated Clarence Vinson (United States) 18-6
- Defeated Raimkul Malakhbekov (Russia) 18-12

2004

- Round of 32: Defeated Liu Yuan of China – PTS (21-7)
- Round of 16: Defeated Mehar Ullah of Pakistan – RSC 3
- Quarterfinals: Defeated Gennady Kovalev of Russia – PTS (20-5)
- Semifinals: Defeated Bahodirjon Sooltonov of Uzbekistan – PTS (27-13)
- Gold Medal Match: Defeated Worapoj Petchkoom of Thailand – PTS (22-13)

=== Other highlights ===
- 2000 Cuban national amateur champion - bantamweight
- 2001 Cuban national amateur champion - bantamweight
- 2001 World amateur champion - bantamweight (in Belfast, Northern Ireland)
  - Defeated Kazumasa Tsujimoto (Japan) RSC 2
  - Defeated Reidar Walstad (Norway) RSC 2
  - Defeated Artur Mikaelian (Greece) 24-8
  - Defeated Sergey Danilchenko (Ukraine) 15-6
  - Defeated Aghasi Mammadov (Turkey) 30-24
- 2002 Cuban national amateur champion - bantamweight
- 2002 World Cup champion - bantamweight (in Astana, Kazakhstan)
  - Defeated Justin Kane (Australia) RSC 1
  - Defeated Keren Gurgen (Turkey) RSC 1
  - Defeated Chotipat Wongprates (Thailand) 13-2
  - Defeated Toljen Kanatov (Kazakhstan) 7-6
- 2003 Cuban national amateur champion - bantamweight
- 2003 competed as a bantamweight at World championships in Bangkok, Thailand. Results were:
  - Defeated Andrzej Liczik (Poland) 15-1
  - Lost to Aghasi Mammadov (Azerbaijan) 13-16
- 2003 Bantamweight gold medalist at Pan-American games in Santo Domingo, Dominican Republic
  - Defeated Argenis Mendez (Dominican Republic) 17-2
  - Defeated Alexander Espinoza (Venezuela) RSC 2
  - Defeated Andrew Kooner (Canada) 22-2
  - Defeated Abner Mares (Mexico) 17-7
- 2004 Cuban national amateur champion - bantamweight
- 2005 Cuban national amateur champion - bantamweight
- 2005 World amateur champion at bantamweight in competition held in Mianyang, PR China
  - Defeated Vladislav Sokolov (Latvia) RTD 2
  - Defeated Ougonchulun Batkhuu (Mongolia) RSC
  - Defeated Bahodirjon Sooltonov (Uzbekistan) RSC 3
  - Defeated Ali Hallab (France) 37-23
  - Defeated Rustamhodza Rahimov (Germany) 19-9
- 2005 Bantamweight gold medalist at World Cup in Moscow, Russia.
  - Defeated Worapoj Petchkoom (Thailand) 34-16
  - Defeated Zsolt Bedák (Hungary) 28-11
  - Defeated Murat Aiyrmasov (Kazakhstan) 34-7
  - Defeated Maksim Khalikov (Russia) 37-21
- 2006 Cuban national amateur champion
- 2006 Bantamweight gold medalist at Central American Games in Cartagena, Colombia
  - Defeated Juan Velasquez (Puerto Rico) 10-1
  - Defeated Jhonatan Romero (Colombia) walk-over
  - Defeated Arturo Santos Reyes (Mexico) 14-3
- 2006 Bantamweight gold medalist at Nations Cup in Baku, Azerbaijan
  - Defeated Mirzhan Rakhimzhanov (Kazakhstan) 28-10
  - Defeated Rau'shee Warren (United States) 21-17
  - Defeated Elshad Guliyev (Azerbaijan) walk-over
  - Defeated Ali Aliyev (Russia) RSC 3

Rigondeaux finished his amateur career having around 475 fights under his belt, with a record of 463 wins and 12 losses.

== Defection ==
On 22 July 2007, Rigondeaux and teammate Erislandy Lara failed to appear for their scheduled bouts at the Pan American Games in Brazil. It was initially announced that Rigondeaux was to turn professional, joining fellow 2004 Cuban Olympians Odlanier Solis, Yuriorkis Gamboa and Yan Bartelemí, who defected earlier in 2007. As with the other Cuban defectors, Rigondeaux signed a promotional deal with Ahmet Oener and ARENA Box-Promotion. However, on 2 August, Rigondeaux and Lara were taken into police custody in Brazil, stating that they wanted to return home to Cuba. However, Cuban leader Fidel Castro then stated that Rigondeaux and Lara could not box again for the Cuban team. In February 2009, Rigondeaux defected again via Mexico City to Miami, and signed with Arena Box-Promotion.

== Professional career ==
=== Super bantamweight ===
==== Early fights ====
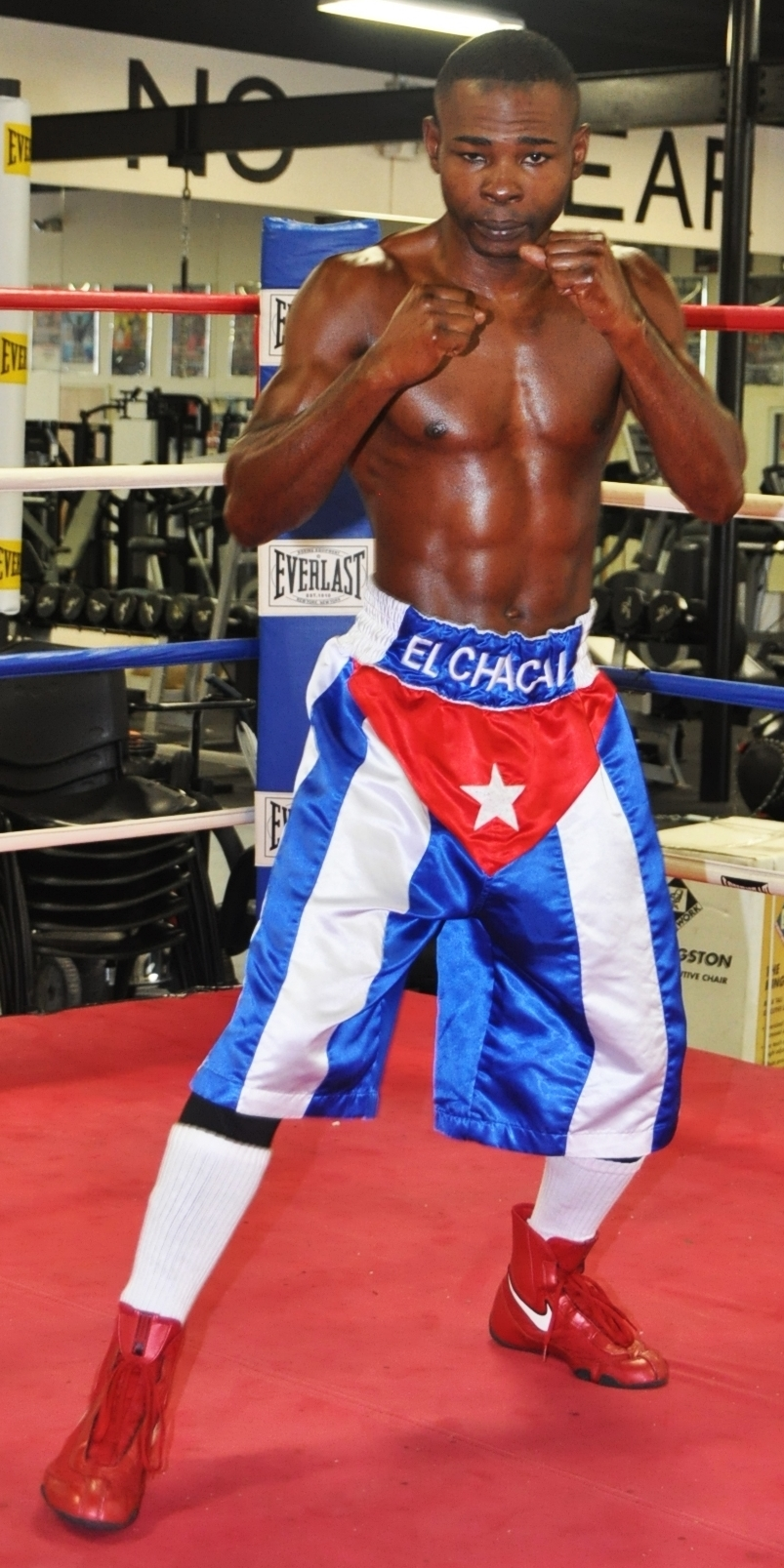
Rigondeaux training in 2011

On 23 February 2009, Rigondeaux was announced to have defected along with 2004 Olympic Silver Medalist Yudel Johnson, Yordanis Despaigne and Yuniel Dorticos. He would train in the same gym as Yuriorkis Gamboa, Erislandy Lara and Odlanier Solis and would continue his career as a professional once he completed all the residency requirements. He left behind his wife Farah Colina, a 7-year-old son and a 17-year-old stepson in Cuba. He was also reportedly staying in the home of countryman and featherweight contender Yuriorkis Gamboa.

Rigondeaux won his professional debut on 22 May with a third-round technical knockout (TKO) over Juan Noriega in Miami. Although he did not maintain a busy punch volume, Rigondeaux still landed hard shots. Noriega barely countered Rigondeaux's punches and the referee found the opportunity to stop the fight after Rigondeaux connected with a solid right to the head. On 17 July, he won his second pro fight against Robert Guillen by first round knockout. Rigondeaux was not active but he hit Guillen with a great hard counterpunch to the body which left him rolling on the canvas in pain.

On 18 September, Rigondeaux beat Giovanni Andrade by third-round TKO to win the NABA super bantamweight title, dropping Andrade once in each of rounds two and three.

On 16 December 2009, Rigondeaux won a unanimous decision over Lante Addy in 8 rounds, dropping Addy once in round one.

On 5 February 2010, Rigondeaux scored a first-round knockout against Adolfo Landeros, dropping Landeros with a hard left uppercut to the body.

Rigondeaux then signed a three-year contract with Bob Arum's Top Rank in July 2010. He is also co-promoted by Boris Arencibia's Caribe Promotions.

On 13 November 2010, Rigondeaux fought Ricardo Cordoba on the undercard of the WBC super welterweight title fight between Manny Pacquiao vs. Antonio Margarito at the Cowboys Stadium, Dallas, in front of 41,734 people. This was the biggest fight in Rigondeaux's career to date. Rigondeaux knocked Cordoba down in the fourth round with a body shot, but was judged to be knocked down himself in the sixth, in what appeared to be a slip. Despite appearing to win clearly, the fight was judged a split decision, with Rigondeaux the victor and becoming a world champion in his seventh bout, winning the interim WBA super bantamweight title.

On 19 March 2011, Rigondeaux fought Willie Casey at the City West Convention Centre, Dublin, Ireland. This was Rigondeaux's first defense of his interim WBA title. A sweeping left uppercut in the opening round caught Casey flush and sent him back on his rear causing his glove to touch the mat at 1 minute and 45 seconds. He was up immediately and received a mandatory eight-count. A combination ending with a left hook sent Casey falling across the ring and down at 2 minutes and 19 seconds. He was able to make it to his feet but was visibly wobbled. A follow-up barrage sent Casey stumbling forward, prompting the referee to step in and call an end to the bout.

==== World super bantamweight champion ====
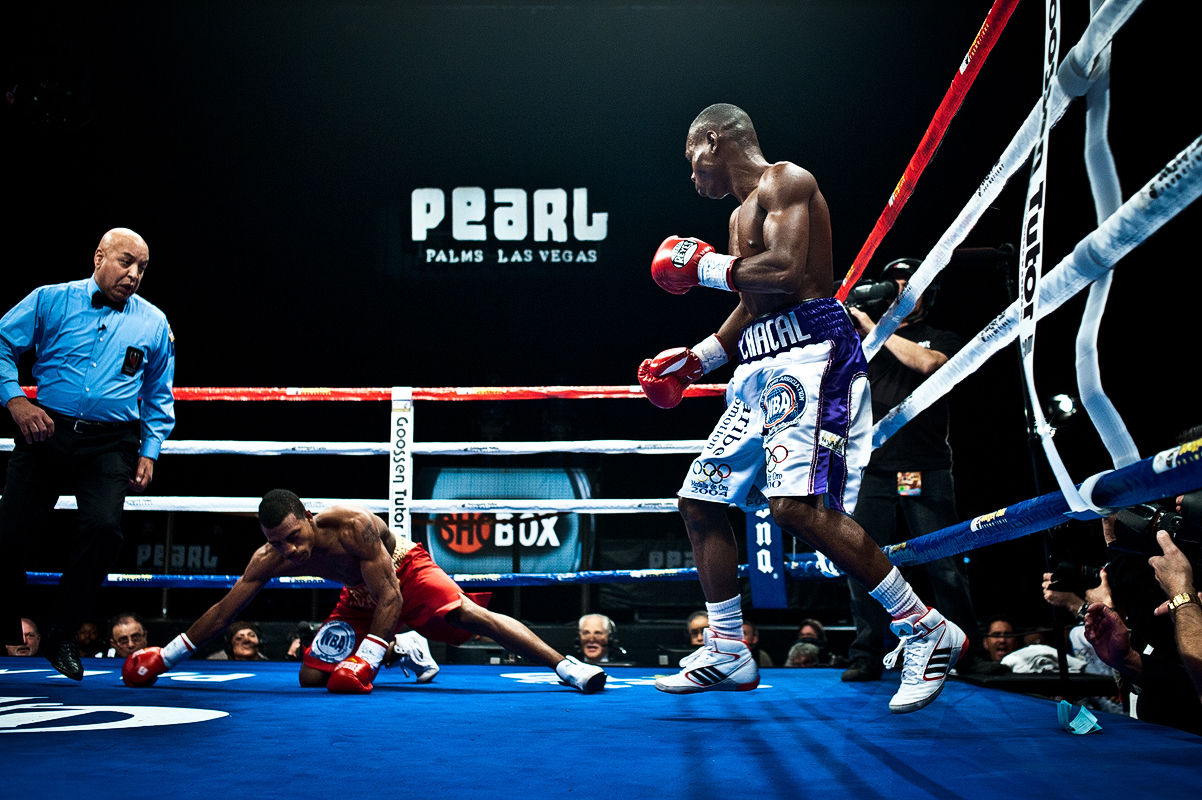
Rigondeaux knocking down Ramos

On 20 January 2012, Rigondeaux won the full WBA super bantamweight title by knocking out champion and The Ring magazine's No. 2 ranked super bantamweight, Rico Ramos (20-0, 11 KOs), in the sixth round. Rigondeaux controlled the opening round against a tentative Ramos. He quickly moved into range and fired the left hand both to the body and upstairs. A straight left hand caught Ramos against the ropes and sent him down at 2 minutes and 24 seconds of the opening round. He was up quickly and received a mandatory eight-count. Rigondeaux attacked but Ramos gathered himself and finished the round. Output waned in the second and third rounds with both fighters looking for counter-punch opportunities, neither seeming overly willing to open up. An accidental clash of heads opened a small cut on the outside of Ramos' left eyebrow near the end of round 4. Rigondeaux was warned in round 6 for pulling down the back of Ramos' head. Immediately after the warning, Rigondeaux came forward with a barrage and landed a clean left hand to the body that sent Ramos to the canvas grimacing in pain. He remained down on his back as the referee reached the count of ten.

==== Miscellaneous defences ====
Despite Rigondeaux and his camp's efforts to make a fight with any of the other 122 pound champions, fights with champions such as Nonito Donaire, Toshiaki Nishioka, Jeffrey Mathebula and Abner Mares failed to materialise. Rigondeaux said, "They are cowards". On 9 June 2012, Rigondeaux made the first defence of his WBA super bantamweight title against Teon Kennedy on the undercard of the Manny Pacquiao vs. Timothy Bradley WBO welterweight title fight at the MGM Grand Garden Arena, Las Vegas, Nevada. Rigondeaux knew the split decision victory against Ricardo Cordoba did not please the HBO people, and learned from it the importance of aggressiveness. From the standpoint of promotion, the second appearance on HBO was crucial for him. He did not want to make the same mistake as he did two years ago. Rigondeaux impressively stopped Kennedy in the fifth round after knocking him down five times, all with his left cross, leading Kennedy to say "He just hits you with punches that you can't see". He has differentiated from the Cordoba fight. Now that he realized that he needed to not only win a fight but also entertain, his promoter Bob Arum stated that Rigondeaux could one day face Nonito Donaire, Jorge Arce, or Wilfredo Vázquez, Jr.

On 15 September 2012, Rigondeaux fought Roberto Marroquin on the undercard of the Sergio Martínez vs. Julio César Chávez, Jr. fight at the Thomas & Mack Center, Las Vegas, Nevada. It was a relatively easy night for Rigondeaux, who outworked and outlanded Marroquin and seemed to just cruise through the fight. Rigondeaux gave his young opponent the first knockdown of his career in the fifth-round and scored another knockdown in the twelfth. The judges scored the bout 118-108, 118-108 and 118-109, all three in favour of Rigondeaux who retained his WBA title by unanimous decision.

==== Rigondeaux vs. Donaire ====
On 13 April 2013, Rigondeaux fought in a unification bout against WBO and The Ring champion Nonito Donaire at Radio City Music Hall, New York. Rigondeaux left his trainer Jorge Rubio in order to start training with his former amateur trainer Pedro Diaz for this fight. Donaire came into the fight as the No. 5 pound-for-pound fighter in the world.

In front of a sellout crowd of 6,145, Rigondeaux defeated Donaire by unanimous (114–113, 115–112, and 116–111). becoming the unified WBA (Super), WBO, The Ring and lineal super bantamweight champion. Rigondeaux frustrated Donaire early and often with his quick lead right hook, and left hand. Rigondeaux would continue to land the cleaner punches and dip out of range from Donaire for the first nine rounds of the fight. But in the tenth-round, Rigondeaux got caught with a left hook from Donaire, sending him to the canvas. Rigondeaux appeared to hurt Donaire with a straight left early in the twelfth-round, when Donaire covered up a severely swollen right eye and began bleeding from his mouth. Rigondeaux ended the round and fight targeting Donaire with his left hand, backing Donaire up. Rigondeaux landed 129 of 396 punches thrown (33%) and Donaire landed 82 of his 352 thrown (23%). Donaire was outlanded in 11 rounds.

RingTV.com scored it 117–110 in favor of Rigondeaux, and HBO's Harold Lederman had it 118–109 for him. Donaire's purse was $1.32 million and Rigondeaux earned a career-high $750,000 purse. The fight averaged 1.1 million viewers on HBO.

==== Rigondeaux vs. Agbeko ====
Rigondeaux was next scheduled to fight former bantamweight titlist Joseph Agbeko on 7 December 2013, at the Boardwalk Hall, Atlantic City, New Jersey. Rigondeaux retained his WBA (Super), WBO, The Ring and lineal super bantamweight titles via unanimous decision, winning every round on all three judges scorecards (120-108). The fight was criticized for its lack of action. The fight averaged 550,000 viewers on HBO. Prior to the fight, there were rumours that a rematch could surface between Rigondeaux and Donaire. Rigondeaux was open to the idea but stated if the fight was to take place again, Donaire would need to accept the fight at 123 pounds and weigh no more than 133 the next day.

==== Rigondeaux vs. Kokietgym ====
Top Rank announced the next defense would be against veteran Sod Kokietgym (63–2–1, 28 KOs) on 19 July 2014, at the Cotai Arena, Macao. Rigondeaux won the bout, after the fight was stopped halfway through the first round. Kokietgym hit the canvas due to a hard, accidental clash of heads, he was given time to recover, however when he got up, the two touched gloves as respect before Rigondeaux threw an ungentlemanly 'sucker punch' right hook to end the fight while they touched gloves with the other glove. This resembled the ending of the welterweight world title bout between Floyd Mayweather Jr. and Victor Ortiz in Las Vegas. This was the first professional fight for Rigondeaux outside of the United States and Kokietgym entered the fight having not lost in over eight years. It was the last time Rigondeaux fought under the Top Rank banner. After the fight, Rigondeaux stated that he wanted to unify the division, proposing fights to fellow division titleholders Leo Santa Cruz and Kiko Martinez.

==== Rigondeaux vs. Amagasa, Francisco ====
On 31 December 2014, Rigondeaux retained his titles against Japan's Hisashi Amagasa at the Osaka Prefectural Gymnasium, Osaka, Japan. Rigondeaux was down twice in the seventh round but stated one of them was a slip/push. Amagasa was down in the ninth. Referee Mike Ortega stopped the bout after Amagasa failed to get up off his stool after round 11, suffering swelling around his right eye and facial disfigurement from what appeared to be a broken left jaw or cheek.

On 13 November 2015 it was announced that Rigondeaux would return to the United States after 23 months, and his first fight in 11 months on the Cotto-Canelo PPV undercard on 21 November 2015, at the Mandalay Bay Events Centre in Las Vegas against 33 year old Filipino boxer Drian Fancisco (28–3–1, 22 KOs). Rigondeaux won the fight via unanimous decision (97–93, 100–90 twice) in a very one-sided fight to claim the vacant WBC International Silver super bantamweight title.

==== Scheduled bout in UK and visa issues ====
Rigondeaux was scheduled to fight Liverpool's James 'Jazza' Dickens (22–1, 7 KOs) on 12 March 2016, at the Echo Arena, Liverpool, England, on the undercard of Terry Flanagan vs. Derry Matthews. This would be the UK debut for Rigondeaux, who was training in Russia. It was announced on the fight night that the fight was off and Rigondeaux had returned to the United States due to failing to obtain a UK visa. Dickens still fought on the undercard defeating Reynaldo Cajina.

On 14 May 2016, Rigondeaux was reinstated as the WBA (Super) super bantamweight champion due to Carl Frampton being stripped of the belt for failing to negotiate his first defence. Rigondeaux would most likely defend the title against Jazza Dickens or WBA bantamweight champion Jamie McDonnell. WBA ordered Rigondeaux to face interim titleholder Moises Flores (24–0, 17 KOs) by 1 August, in a mandatory defence.

==== Rigondeaux vs. Dickens ====
It was confirmed that Rigondeaux would defend his WBA (Super) and lineal titles against Jazza Dickens on 16 July at the Ice Arena, Cardiff, Wales. The fight was originally scheduled for March, but was cancelled due to Rigondeaux having visa issues. This was Rigondeaux's first fight in the UK. Rigondeaux retained his belts after breaking Dickens' jaw in round 2 with a huge left hand. Dickens was forced to retire after the round.

==== Rigondeaux vs. Flores ====
On 20 July 2016, in their continued desire to reduce the number of champions, the WBA ordered Rigondeaux to make a mandatory defence of his title against their interim titleholder, 29-year-old Mexican boxer Moises Flores (25–0, 17 KO). On 7 December, the WBA announced a purse bid would be held on 19 December at the WBA headquarters in Panama City, with a minimum bid of $150,000 with Rigondeaux receiving the bigger split of 75% and 25% going to Flores. A deal was reached before the scheduled purse bids. Flores said he would be dedicating this fight to Alejandro Gonzalez, a boxer who was killed in Mexico in December. The fight would likely take place on the Roc Nation Sports card on 25 February 2017, live on HBO ppv, a co-feature to light-middleweight fight Cotto-Kirkland. Flores' IBO world title would also be at stake. The fight was officially announced on 25 January 2017. On 2 February, Kirkland picked up a nose injury which initially called off his ppv fight with Cotto. Later that day, it was announced that the whole card had been cancelled. A new date of March or April was then discussed for the Rigondeaux vs. Flores fight.

The WBA ordered another purse bid to take place on 3 April 2017, at the Panama City headquarters, again with a minimum bid of $150,000. A deal was reached within a week on 31 March between both parties. The date being discussed was 17 June 2017, meaning it would be an undercard fight for Ward-Kovalev II on HBO PPV. Flores' promoter Tom Brown confirmed the terms were being agreed. It was reported that Rigondeaux would earn a purse of $120,000 whilst Flores would earn $25,000.

Rigondeaux retained his WBA and lineal titles as well as claim the IBO super bantamweight title after controversially knocking Flores out at the end of round 1. Before the bell sounded for the end of the round, both fighters locked in a flurry, with Rigondeaux holding Flores' head, both exchanged combinations. Whilst Flores missed his shots, Rigondeaux landed a hook to the head after the bell. As referee Vic Drakulich managed to separate the two, Flores, after a split second, fell backwards. The referee then turned his attention to Flores and after viewing ringside replay, without sound, ruled it a knockout win for Rigondeaux. Rigondeaux said, through a translator, "We both threw punches at the same time and mine landed first. It was only a matter of time [until the knockout happened]."

Nevada State Athletic Commission executive director Bob Bennett was brought in to discuss the ending with HBO's Jim Lampley, and said if the punch was thrown after the bell, they would review the decision. He also went on to say that it could turn out as a disqualification loss for Rigondeaux. Paulie Malignaggi, who was working as a pundit for Sky Sports, thought Flores had over-reacted when he fell onto the canvas, maybe looking for a DQ win. The next day, Bob Bennett fully reviewed the tape and agreed the punch landed after the bell but was unintentional, meaning the result could change to a no decision with the WBA possibly ordering a rematch. On 20 June, Bob Bennett told ESPN that there was plans to change the outcome of the fight to a 'no decision'. Bennett could not unilaterally change the result, nor can the commission chairman, although it must be voted on by the four commissioners. On 26 June, the result was officially changed to a no contest.

On 6 July 2017, the WBA ordered an immediate rematch to take place between Rigondeaux and Flores, within 150 days of the first fight, meaning it would likely take place around November 2017. Flores was given a 60-day medical suspension from the Nevada commission. The two sides had until 17 August or it would go to purse bids.

=== Super featherweight ===
==== Rigondeaux vs. Lomachenko ====
On 6 August, Arum stated that Vasiliy Lomachenko would fight for a third time in 2017, likely on 9 or 23 December. When asked who the potential options where, Arum stated, ''Well, there's a few guys. (Guillermo) Rigondeaux if he answers Dino (Duva's) call. There's (Orlando) Salido, who's sniffing around and the third is (Miguel) Berchelt." Arum also mentioned lightweight contender Ray Beltrán, but said he would like to capture a world title at lightweight before a potential fight with Lomachenko. On 14 August, Arum spoke to LA Times and confirmed either Rigondeaux or Salido would be Lomachenko's next opponent. He stated if the bout with Rigondeaux was made, it would likely take place at the Madison Square Garden Theatre and a potential rematch with Salido would take place in Los Angeles. On 21 August, Arum stated both camps were closing in on finalising a deal for 9 December. On 15 September, the bout between Lomachenko and Rigondeaux was confirmed. The fight was confirmed to take place at 130 pounds. On 18 November, Carl Moretti of Top Rank revealed a re-hydration clause on the contract. Both fighters agreed to weigh in at 09:00 on the morning of the fight, where they would not be able to exceed 138 pounds. Any fighter over the limit would face a penalty of more than $10,000. On 28 November, the WBA announced that Rigondeaux would lose his title at super bantamweight if he lost to Lomachenko. WBA president Gilberto Mendoza Jr. went on to say if Rigondeaux defeats Lomachenko, he would have five days to decide whether he is to return to the division or stay at super featherweight. He stated that special permission was granted because the bout was 'an important fight for boxing'. Upon receiving the news, Rigondeaux took to Twitter and stated he was disappointed. On fight night, Lomachenko weighed 137.4 pounds and Rigondeaux weighed 130 pounds.

In front of a sell out crowd of 5,102 at the Theater, Lomachenko retained his WBO title using a combination of size, speed and angles, eventually forcing Rigondeaux to quit. Rigondeaux never landed more than three punches per round. He said he could not continue because he broke his hand during the fight; it was later revealed that it was bruised, not broken. Rigondeaux became Lomachenko's fourth consecutive opponent to retire on his stool. The loss also marked the first time Rigondeaux had lost since 2003, when he was still an amateur. At the time of stoppage, Lomachenko was ahead on all three judges' scorecards, 60–53, 59–54 and 59–54.

In the post-fight interviews, Lomachenko was asked about Rigondeaux being his fourth consecutive opponent to retire on his stool, to which Lomachenko joked, "Maybe I should change my second name, now my name is 'No Mas Chenko'." He also went on to say, "This is not his weight, so it's not a big win for me. But he's a good fighter. He's got great skills. I adjusted to his style, low blows and all." Speaking to an interpreter, Rigondeaux said, "I lost, no excuses. I injured the top of my left hand in the second round. He's a very technical fighter. He's explosive. I'm gonna come back because that's what I do. The weight was not a factor in this fight. It was the injury to my hand." According to CompuBox statistics, Lomachenko landed 55 of 339 punches thrown (16%) and Rigondeaux landed 15 of his 178 thrown (8%), landing no more than 3 punches per round. For the fight, Lomachenko was guaranteed a purse of $1.2 million whereas Rigondeaux earned a $400,000 purse. The card averaged 1.73 million viewers on ESPN, which did not include ESPN Deportes or the online streaming service.

As stated by the WBA, in the January 2018 rankings, Rigondeaux was removed as their 'Super' champion.

==== Inactivity ====
Rigondeaux returned to training on 25 July 2018. On 2 August, Rigondeaux and Roc Nation Sports came to a mutual agreement to terminate their contract. With a year left on the contract, Dino Duva told ESPN, "We weren't able to come up with anything significant for him, and he's in the later part of his career, so if he's a free agent, maybe he can go make a fight for himself. We're OK with that and we wish him the best." Roc Nation promoted Rigondeaux in four bouts.

On 20 November 2018, it was reported that Rigondeaux started training with Veteran trainer Ronnie Shields. Shields, a well known trainer who also trained Cuban boxer Erislandy Lara at the time, welcomed Rigondeaux to his training base in Houston, Texas.

After signing with advisor Al Haymon, now fighting under the Premier Boxing Champions banner, it was announced on 29 November, Rigondeaux would make his ring return on either 22 December 2018 or 13 January 2019. It was reported that he would return to super bantamweight, but could see a move up to featherweight. Rigondeaux's co-manager Alex Bornote later confirmed he would fight on a date in January 2019.

==== Rigondeaux vs. Delgado ====
In December 2018, it was announced that Rigondeaux would fight journeyman Giovanni Delgado (16–8, 9 KOs) at the super featherweight limit on 13 January 2019, at the Microsoft Theater, Los Angeles, California. It was initially reported that Rigondeaux would fight Daniel Rosas (21–4–1, 13 KOs), before RingTV announced the change. Delgado was originally scheduled to fight on the same card against Fernando Garcia. Rigondeaux stopped Delgado via first-round knockout. Delgado made it to the end of the first round when he was dropped hard by an overhand left to the head. Although the round had ended, referee Jack Reiss decided to stop it anyway at the count of nine. The official time of the stoppage was at 3 minutes of round 1. After the fight, Rigondeaux said, "I came prepared and I am ready to face people that are undefeated. Whoever has a belt, I am taking it. You can expect me back in less than two months." Rigondeaux's purse for the fight was $25,000 compared to $14,500 for Delgado.

=== Return at super bantamweight ===
==== Rigondeaux vs. Ceja ====
Rigondeaux's next bout was scheduled to take place as a co-feature to the rematch between Tony Harrison and Jermell Charlo on 23 June 2019 at the Mandalay Bay Events Center in Paradise, Nevada. Rigondeaux's opponent was confirmed to be former WBC interim champion Julio Ceja (32–3, 28 KOs), with the fight being a WBC eliminator. The PBC card aired live on Fox and Fox Deportes. Rigondeaux won the fight by an eight-round technical knockout. The fight was back-and-forth, with both fighters finding success, before Rigondeaux landed a left hook that floored Ceja at the very end of the round.

=== Bantamweight ===
==== Rigondeaux vs. Solís ====
Rigondeaux was scheduled to fight Liborio Solís on 21 December 2020, for the vacant WBA (Regular) bantamweight title. The fight was set to precede the rematch between WBC junior middleweight champion Tony Harrison and Jermell Charlo. The fight was postponed as Solis was unable to enter the United States due to visa issues. PBC stated their plans to schedule the fight for early 2020. The fight was rescheduled for 8 February 2020. Rigondeaux won the fight by split decision, with two of the judges scoring the bout 114–113 in his favor, while the third judge scored it 115–112 for Solís.

==== Rigondeaux vs. Casimero ====
Rigondeaux challenged the reigning WBO bantamweight champion John Riel Casimero on 14 August 2021. It was announced on 19 June that WBC champion Nonito Donaire would replace Rigondeaux, but when the fight between Casimero and Donaire fell apart over insults directed at the latter's wife, Rigondeaux stepped back in to fight Casimero as had been originally planned. His WBA (Regular) title was not on the line, as the WBA stripped him of the title upon his entry into the ring "due to restrictions on behalf of the WBO". In a low-key affair that saw the CompuBox record broken for fewest combined landed punches in a 12-round fight, Casimero pressured his opponent all night, fighting on the front foot and throwing more punches than Rigondeaux, who was reluctant to engage. Casimero was rewarded with a split decision victory, with scores of 117–111 and 116–112 in his favor, and 115–113 in favor of Rigondeaux.

==== Rigondeaux vs. Astrolabio ====
On 26 February 2022, Rigondeaux suffered the third professional defeat of his career, losing a shock ten-round unanimous decision to the unheralded Vincent Astrolabio (16–3, 12 KO) at the Emirates Golf Club in Dubai. Rigondeaux was knocked down by a jab and straight right hand in the eighth round. The knockdown proved to be the difference on the judges' scorecards, with all three judges scoring the bout 95–94 in favor of Astrolabio.

==== Rigondeaux vs. Martinez ====
Returning after suffering serious eye injuries, Rigondeaux faced Jesus Martinez on 24 February 2023, winning the bout via first-round knockout.

=== Second return at super bantamweight ===
==== Rigondeaux vs. Clemente-Andino ====
Rigondeaux was then scheduled to face Julian Evaristo Aristule on 9 June 2023, but due to visa issues his opponent was changed to Charlie Clemente-Andino. Rigondeaux won the bout via seventh-round knockout.

==== Rigondeaux vs. Aguero Arias ====
Riding a two-fight win streak, Rigondeaux faced Dannis Aguero Arias for the vacant WBC International super bantamweight title on 12 November 2024 at club E11even in Miami, FL by way of BOXR Entertainment. He captured the belt via first-round stoppage via a body punch.

==== Rigondeaux vs. Velasquez ====
On 2 April 2026, it was announced that Rigondeaux, along with fellow Cuban Yuriorkis Gamboa, had signed a one-fight deal with Matteo Attalla, owner of the Boxer Gym in Miami, to appear in separate bouts, on 2 May. His opponent was Jose Velasquez (34–13–3, 24 KOs) and the fight card was moved to a new date of 30 May and a new venue, the War Memorial Auditorium in Fort Lauderdale. Rigondeaux won the bout via unanimous decision after 8 rounds.

== Boxing Style ==
Rigondeaux is known for his hit, but don't get hit style of boxing. In his Southpaw stance he emphasizes defense such as slipping and shoulder rolls allowing him to set up counters. His exceptionally fast hand speed, punching power, counterpunching abilities, athleticism, reflexes, and footwork are well noted.

== In other media ==
A documentary on Rigondeaux, Split Decision, has been in the works by filmmaker Brin-Jonathan Butler. Butler also published a biography of Rigondeaux in 2014, entitled A Cuban Boxer's Journey: From Castro's Traitor to American Champion, published by Picador USA.

== Personal life ==
In March 2022, Rigondeaux suffered serious eye injuries in a pressure cooker accident at his home in Miami.

== Professional boxing record ==
28 fights	24 wins	3 losses
By knockout	16	1
By decision	8	2
No contests	1	

No.	Result	Record	Opponent	Type	Round, time	Date	Location	Notes
28	Win	24–3 (1)	Jose Velasquez	UD	8	30 May 2026	FTL War Memorial Auditorium, Fort Lauderdale, Florida, U.S	
27	Win	23–3 (1)	Dannis Agüero Arias	KO	1 (10), 1:46	12 Nov 2024	E11Even Night Club, Miami, Florida, U.S	Won vacant WBC International super bantamweight title
26	Win	22–3 (1)	Charlie Clemente-Andino	KO	7 (10), 2:43	9 Jun 2023	Casino Miami Jai Alai, Miami, Florida, U.S	
25	Win	21–3 (1)	Jesus Martinez	KO	1 (10), 2:57	24 Feb 2023	Hialeah, Florida, U.S	
24	Loss	20–3 (1)	Vincent Astrolabio	UD	10	26 Feb 2022	Emirates Golf Club, Dubai, U.A.E.	For vacant WBC International bantamweight title
23	Loss	20–2 (1)	John Riel Casimero	SD	12	14 Aug 2021	Dignity Health Sports Park, Carson, California, U.S.	For WBO bantamweight title
22	Win	20–1 (1)	Liborio Solís	SD	12	8 Feb 2020	PPL Center, Allentown, Pennsylvania, U.S.	Won vacant WBA (Regular) bantamweight title
21	Win	19–1 (1)	Julio Ceja	TKO	8 (12), 2:59	23 Jun 2019	Mandalay Bay Events Center, Paradise, Nevada, U.S.	
20	Win	18–1 (1)	Giovanni Delgado	KO	1 (8), 2:59	13 Jan 2019	Microsoft Theater, Los Angeles, California, U.S.	
19	Loss	17–1 (1)	Vasiliy Lomachenko	RTD	6 (12), 3:00	9 Dec 2017	The Theater at Madison Square Garden, New York City, New York, U.S.	For WBO junior lightweight title
18	NC	17–0 (1)	Moises Flores	KO	1 (12), 3:00	17 Jun 2017	Mandalay Bay Events Center, Paradise, Nevada, U.S.	Retained WBA (Super) super bantamweight titles; For IBO super bantamweight title; Originally KO win for Rigondeaux, later ruled NC due to incorrect referee call
17	Win	17–0	Jazza Dickens	RTD	2 (12), 3:00	16 Jul 2016	Ice Arena, Cardiff, Wales	Retained WBA (Super) super bantamweight title
16	Win	16–0	Drian Francisco	UD	10	21 Nov 2015	Mandalay Bay Events Center, Paradise, Nevada, U.S.	Retained The Ring super bantamweight title; Won vacant WBC International Silver super bantamweight title
15	Win	15–0	Hisashi Amagasa	RTD	11 (12), 3:00	31 Dec 2014	Osaka Prefectural Gymnasium, Osaka, Japan	Retained WBA (Super), WBO, and The Ring super bantamweight titles
14	Win	14–0	Sod Kokietgym	KO	1 (12), 1:44	19 Jul 2014	Cotai Arena, Macau, SAR	Retained WBA (Super), WBO, and The Ring super bantamweight titles
13	Win	13–0	Joseph Agbeko	UD	12	7 Dec 2013	Boardwalk Hall, Atlantic City, New Jersey, U.S.	Retained WBA (Super), WBO, and The Ring super bantamweight titles
12	Win	12–0	Nonito Donaire	UD	12	13 Apr 2013	Radio City Music Hall, New York City, New York, U.S.	Retained WBA (Super) super bantamweight title; Won WBO and The Ring super bantamweight titles
11	Win	11–0	Roberto Marroquin	UD	12	15 Sep 2012	Thomas & Mack Center, Paradise, Nevada, U.S.	Retained WBA super bantamweight title
10	Win	10–0	Teon Kennedy	TKO	5 (12), 1:11	9 Jun 2012	MGM Grand Garden Arena, Paradise, Nevada, U.S.	Retained WBA super bantamweight title
9	Win	9–0	Rico Ramos	KO	6 (12), 1:29	21 Jan 2012	Pearl Concert Theater, Paradise, Nevada, U.S.	Won WBA super bantamweight title
8	Win	8–0	Willie Casey	TKO	1 (12), 2:35	19 Mar 2011	Citywest Hotel, Saggart, Ireland	Retained WBA interim super bantamweight title
7	Win	7–0	Ricardo Cordoba	SD	12	13 Nov 2010	Cowboys Stadium, Arlington, Texas, U.S.	Won vacant WBA interim super bantamweight title
6	Win	6–0	Jose Angel Beranza	RTD	7 (8), 0:10	21 Aug 2010	Auditorio Municipal, Tijuana, Mexico	
5	Win	5–0	Adolfo Landeros	KO	1 (8), 0:28	5 Feb 2010	Don Taft University Center, Fort Lauderdale, Florida, U.S.	
4	Win	4–0	Lante Addy	UD	8	16 Dec 2009	B.B. King Blues Club & Grill, New York City, New York, U.S.	
3	Win	3–0	Giovanni Andrade	TKO	3 (10), 2:53	18 Sep 2009	Fontainebleau Hotel, Miami Beach, Florida, U.S.	Won vacant WBA–NABA super bantamweight title
2	Win	2–0	Robert Guillen	TKO	1 (4), 2:57	17 Jul 2009	Planet Hollywood Resort & Casino, Paradise, Nevada, U.S.	
1	Win	1–0	Juan Noriega	TKO	3 (4), 1:09	22 May 2009	Fontainebleau Hotel, Miami Beach, Florida, U.S.	

Sporting positions
Regional boxing titles
Vacant Title last held by Olivier Lontchi	WBA–NABA super bantamweight champion 18 September 2009 – September 2010; Vacated	Vacant Title next held by Teon Kennedy
Vacant Title last held by Rey Vargas	WBC International Silver super bantamweight champion 21 November 2015 – September 2016; Vacated	Vacant Title next held by Rey Vargas
Major world boxing titles
Vacant Title last held by Poonsawat Kratingdaenggym	WBA super bantamweight champion Interim title 13 November 2010 – 20 January 2012; Won full title	Vacant Title next held by Scott Quigg
Preceded by Rico Ramos	WBA super bantamweight champion 20 January 2012 – 13 April 2013; Promoted to Super champion	Succeeded by Scott Quigg
Vacant Title last held by Celestino Caballero	WBA super bantamweight champion Super title 13 April 2013 – 30 October 2015; Status changed	Vacant Title next held by Carl Frampton
Preceded by Nonito Donaire	WBO super bantamweight champion 13 April 2013 – 28 October 2015; Stripped	Vacant Title next held by Nonito Donaire
Preceded by Nonito Donaire	The Ring super bantamweight champion 13 April 2013 – 9 February 2016; Stripped	Vacant
Vacant Title last held by Carl Frampton	WBA super bantamweight champion Super title 14 May 2016 – 9 December 2017; Stripped	Vacant Title next held by Daniel Roman
Vacant Title last held by Naoya Inoue	WBA bantamweight champion Regular title 8 February 2020 – 14 August 2021; Stripped	Title discontinued
Honorary boxing titles
New title	WBA super bantamweight champion In recess 30 October 2015 – 6 May 2016; Reinstated	Title discontinued
