= George Olteanu =

Romanian boxer

Personal information
- Full name: George Crinu Raicu-Olteanu
- Nationality: Romania
- Born: May 3, 1974 (age 52) Ștefănești, Argeș
- Height: 1.67 m (5 ft 6 in)
- Weight: 54 kg (119 lb)

Sport
- Sport: Boxing
- Weight class: Bantamweight
Medal record
World Amateur Championships
Gold medal – first place	1999 Houston	Bantamweight

George Olteanu (born May 3, 1974, in Ștefănești, Argeș) is a former boxer from Romania, who competed for his native country at the 1996 Summer Olympics in Atlanta, United States. There he was defeated in the quarter finals of the men's bantamweight division (– 54 kg) by István Kovács of Hungary: 2-24. In 1999 Olteanu won the world title in Houston, Texas. He also competed at the 2000 Summer Olympics where he was defeated 19–26 in the quarter finals by America's Clarence Vinson.
