= Bekzod Khidirov =

Uzbekistani boxer (born 1981)

Personal information
- Born: December 18, 1981 (age 44)

Sport
- Sport: Boxing
- Weight class: Bantamweight, Featherweight, Lightweight
Medal record
Men's boxing
Representing Uzbekistan
Asian Games
Silver medal – second place	2002 Busan	Bantamweight
Bronze medal – third place	2006 Doha	Lightweight
Asian Championships
Gold medal – first place	2002 Seremban	Bantamweight
Silver medal – second place	2007 Ulan Bator	Lightweight
Bronze medal – third place	2004 Puerto Princesa	Featherweight

Bekzod Khidirov (Бекзод Хидиров; born December 18, 1981) is a boxer from Uzbekistan, who participated at the 2004 Summer Olympics for his native Asian country. There he was stopped in the round of sixteen of the Featherweight (57 kg) division by Kazakhstan's Galib Jafarov.
