= Teon Kennedy =

American boxer

Personal information
- Nickname: The technical
- Nationality: American
- Born: Johnny; June 26, 1986 (age 40) Philadelphia, Pennsylvania
- Height: 5 ft 5 in (165 cm)
- Weight: Super bantamweight

Boxing career
- Reach: 72 in (183 cm)
- Stance: Orthodox

Boxing record
- Total fights: 23
- Wins: 19
- Win by KO: 7
- Losses: 2
- Draws: 2
- No contests: 0

Teon Kennedy (born June 26, 1986) is an American inactive boxer who was previously the IBF and WBA-NABA dual Super Bantamweight champion.

== Amateur career ==
Kennedy was the 2004 National Golden Gloves flyweight champion and a two-time Pennsylvania Golden Gloves champion.

== Professional career ==
In November 2009, Kennedy stopped Francisco Rodriguez in the tenth round, who died two days later.

On Saturday, September 25, 2010, Kennedy stopped Alex Becerra of El Paso, Texas, to win the vacant NABA Super Bantamweight title in the Grand Ballroom main event at Bally's Atlantic City Hotel and Casino.

=== Professional boxing record ===
19 Wins (7 knockouts), 2 Losses 2 Draws 0 No Contest
Res.	Record	Opponent	Type	Rd., Time	Date	Location	Notes
Loss	17–2	(United States) Guillermo Rigondeaux	TKO	5 (12), 1:11	2012-06-09	(United States) MGM Grand Hotel & Casino, Las Vegas, Nevada	For WBA Super Bantamweight title.
Win	17-0	(United States) Jorge Diaz	UD	12 (12)	2011-03-26	(United States) Boardwalk Hall, Atlantic City, New Jersey	USBA super bantamweight title.
