= Alisher Rahimov =

Uzbekistani boxer (born 1977)

Personal information
- Nationality: Uzbekistan
- Born: October 23, 1977 (age 48) Tashkent, Uzbek SSR, Soviet Union
- Height: 1.62 m (5 ft 4 in)
- Weight: 54 kg (119 lb)

Sport
- Sport: Boxing
- Weight class: Bantamweight
Medal record
Asian Championships
Gold medal – first place	1999 Tashkent	Bantamweight

Alisher Rahimov (Russian: Алишер Рахимов; born October 23, 1977) is an amateur boxer from Uzbekistan. He won the gold medal at the 1999 Asian Amateur Boxing Championships in his home nation and competed for the bantamweight division at the 2000 Summer Olympics in Sydney. He defeated South Korea's Cho Seok-Hwan and Algeria's Hicham Blida in the first two rounds, until he lost to Russia's Raimkul Malakhbekov in the quarterfinal match.
