= Artur Mikaelyan =

Armenian boxer

Medal record

Men's Boxing

Representing Armenia

World Championships
Bronze medal – third place	1995 Berlin	Bantamweight

Representing Greece

Mediterranean Games
Bronze medal – third place	2001 Tunis	Bantamweight

Artur Mikaelyan (Armenian: Արթուր Միքայելյան, Greek: Αρτούρ Μικαελιάν; born March 8, 1970, in Kirovakan, Armenian SSR) is an Armenian–Greek amateur boxer.

Mikaelyan won a bronze medal at the 1995 World Amateur Boxing Championships in the bantamweight division. In 1997, he moved to Greece and competed for the country at the 2000 Summer Olympics.

He also won a bronze medal at the 2001 Mediterranean Games and a gold medal at the 2002 Acropolis Cup.
