= Roberto Benitez =

American boxer

Roberto Benitez (born July 30, 1980, in Brooklyn, New York) is a professional boxer from the United States.

== Amateur career ==
Benitez was a highly decorated amateur boxer, and was a four-time United States Amateur champion, winning at Flyweight (1999, 2000, 2001) and Bantamweight (2004). Benitez also won two National Golden Gloves title at Flyweight (1997, 1999).

=== Amateur highlights ===
- In 1998 won the Goodwill Games Gold Medal.
- Won the Olympic trials in the 125 lbs division in 2004 but failed to qualify for the Olympic games.
- Won a gold medal in the 1996 US Junior Olympics at 112 lbs.
- Won a gold medal in 1996 at Junior Olympics International tournament at 112 lbs.
- Won a bronze medal in the 1997 United States championships at 112 lbs.
- Won a gold medal in the 1997 US Junior championships at 112 lbs.
- Won a bronze medal in the 1997 Muhammad Ali Cup at 112 lbs.
- Gold medalist in the 1997 National Golden Gloves at 112 lbs.
- Won a bronze medal in the 1998 United States championships at 112 lbs.
- Won a silver medal in the 1998 Goodwill games at 112 lbs.
- Won a gold medal in the 1999 National Golden Gloves at 112 lbs.
- Won a gold medal in the 2000 United States championships, beating Jose Navarro and Gabriel Elizondo.
- Competed in the Americas Olympic qualifiers representing the Dominican Republic, but losses to Andrew Koomer and Omar Narvaez meant he failed to qualify.
- Won 2001 United States Challenge tournament at 112 lbs. Won gold medal in the 2001 United States championships at 112 lbs. Competed in the 2001 World championships.
- Won a silver medal in the 2002 United States championships at 112 lbs, losing to Raul Martinez.
- Won a silver medal in the 2002 National Golden Gloves at 112 lbs, losing to Ron Siler.
- Won a gold medal in the 2003 American Boxing Classics Tournament at 112 lbs.
- Won a silver medal in the 2003 United States championships at 112 lbs, losing to Raul Martinez.
- Won a bronze medal in the 2003 National Golden Gloves at 112 lbs, losing to Ron Siler.
- Won a gold medal in the 2004 championships at 119 lbs.

== Olympics ==
Benitez competed in the 2000 US Olympic Trials, beating Jose Aguiniga, Rasheem Jefferson, losing to Jose Navarro, beating Aguiniaga again but losing to Jose Navarro in a box-off. Benitez won the 2004 US Olympic trials at 119 lbs beating Miguel Albares, Eric Hunter, Sergio Ramos and Torrence Daniel then beating Hunter in a box-off. Benitez then lost in the Americas Olympic qualifiers to Juan Manuel Lopez at 54 kg.

== Pro career ==
Benitez turned professional in 2005 and won his first five bouts. He then was absent from the ring before returning in late 2009 with a victory.
