= Roberto Marroquin =

American boxer

Personal information
- Born: Roberto Marroquin; August 21, 1989 (age 37) Dallas, Texas
- Height: 5 ft 9 in (175 cm)
- Weight: Super Bantamweight; Featherweight; Super Featherweight; Lightweight

Boxing career
- Reach: 72 in (182 cm)
- Stance: Orthodox

Boxing record
- Total fights: 35
- Wins: 29
- Win by KO: 20
- Losses: 5
- Draws: 1
- No contests: 0

Roberto Marroquin (born August 21, 1989) is an American professional boxer and was signed to Bob Arum's Top Rank.

== Amateur career ==
During his amateur career Marroquin won silver medals at the 2005 National Junior Olympics, 2006 International Aliyev Cup, 2006 National PAL Championships, a Gold medal at the 2006 National Junior Olympics, and another silver medal at the 2008 U.S. Olympic Team Trials. He also has a win over Gary Russell. Marroquin finished with a record of 165–15.

== Professional career ==
In the under card of Manny Pacquiao vs. Joshua Clottey at Cowboys Stadium, Marroquin beat veteran Samuel Sanchez in the second round by K.O.

=== Professional record ===
29 Wins (20 knockouts), 5 Losses, 1 Draw
Res.	Record	Opponent	Type	Rd., Time	Date	Location	Notes
Win	29–5–1	(United States) Darryl Hayes	MD	6	March 26, 2022	(United States) Mesquite Arena, Mesquite, Texas	
Win	28–5–1	(Mexico) Pedro Navarette	SD	6	February 28, 2019	(United States) Hanger No.2 Love Field, Dallas, Texas	
Loss	27–5–1	(Philippines) Rey Perez	KO	8 (8), 1:03	July 28, 2018	(United States) Staples Center, Los Angeles, California	
Win	27–4–1	(Mexico) Ruben Tamayo	KO	5 (8), 1:49	October 14, 2017	(United States) Stub Hub Center, Carson, California	
Win	26–4–1	(Colombia) Jonathan Perez	KO	4 (8), 2:23	June 11, 2017	(United States) Pioneer Event Center, Lancaster, California	
Loss	25–4–1	(Mexico) Carlos Diaz Ramirez	UD	10	May 14, 2016	(Mexico) Gimnasio UAT, Reynosa, Tamaulipas	
Win	25–3–1	(United States) Kuin Evans	TKO	2 (8), 2:31	November 5, 2015	(United States) The Empire Room, Dallas, Texas	
Win	24–3–1	(Puerto Rico) Miguel Soto	RTD	4 (8), 0:10	September 26, 2014	(United States) Mesquite Arena, Mesquite, Texas	
Draw	23–3–1	(Mexico) Alejandro Rodriguez	PTS	8	February 1, 2014	(United States) Laredo Energy Arena, Laredo, Texas	
Loss	23–3	(Nicaragua) Daniel Diaz	SD	10	June 29, 2013	(United States) WinStar World Casino, Thackerville, Oklahoma	
Win	23–2	(Mexico) Antonio Escalante	TKO	3 (10), 0:49	March 16, 2013	(United States) WinStar World Casino, Thackerville, Oklahoma	
Loss	22–2	(Cuba) Guillermo Rigondeaux	UD	12	September 15, 2012	(United States) Thomas & Mack Center, Las Vegas, Nevada	For WBA super Bantamweight title
Win	22–1	(Puerto Rico) Arturo Santiago	KO	2 (8), 1:32	June 16, 2012	(United States) Sun Bowl Stadium, El Paso, Texas	
Win	21–1	(Puerto Rico) Carlos Valcárcel	UD	10	December 17, 2011	(United States) WinStar World Casino, Thackerville, Oklahoma	
Win	20–1	(Mexico) Jose Angel Beranza	UD	8	July 30, 2011	(United States) Softball Country Arena, Denver, Colorado	
Loss	19–1	(Mexico) Francisco Leal	SD	10	April 23, 2011	(United States) WinStar World Casino, Thackerville, Oklahoma	
Win	19–0	(Mexico) Gilberto Sanchez Leon	UD	8	February 26, 2011	(United States) Palms Casino Resort, Las Vegas, Nevada	
Win	18–0	(Mexico) Eduardo Arcos	TKO	4 (8), 1:21	January 22, 2011	(United States) Texas Station, North Las Vegas, Nevada	
Win	17–0	(Mexico) Francisco Dominguez	TKO	1 (6), 1:27	November 13, 2010	(United States) Cowboys Stadium, Arlington, Texas	
Win	16–0	(Mexico) Rafael Cerrillo	UD	6	October 16, 2010	(Mexico) Estadio de Beisbol, Monterrey, Nuevo León	
Win	15–0	(Mexico) Jesus Quintero	TKO	3 (8), 1:40	August 7, 2010	(Mexico) Estadio Hector Espino, Hermosillo, Sonora	
Win	14–0	(Mexico) Arturo Camargo	KO	2 (6), 2:20	May 15, 2010	(Mexico) Estadio Centenario, Los Mochis, Sinaloa	
Win	13–0	(United States) Samuel Sanchez	KO	2 (6), 1:36	March 13, 2010	(United States) Cowboys Stadium, Arlington, Texas	
Win	12–0	(United States) Robert Guillen	TKO	1 (6), 2:30	February 6, 2010	(United States) Convention Center, McAllen, Texas	
Win	11–0	(Kenya) Anthony Napunyi	TKO	3 (6), 0:31	November 13, 2009	(United States) Mandalay Bay House of Blues, Las Vegas, Nevada	
Win	10–0	(Colombia) Jose Garcia Bernal	UD	6	October 17, 2009	(United States) Whataburger Field, Corpus Christi, Texas	
Win	9–0	(United States) Steven Johnson	TKO	2 (6), 1:40	August 29, 2009	(United States) Quick Trip Ballpark, Grand Prairie, Texas	
Win	8–0	(Mexico) Jose Manuel Garcia	TKO	3 (6), 1:27	June 19, 2009	(United States) Dr Pepper Arena, Frisco, Texas	
Win	7–0	(United States) Robert DaLuz	UD	6	May 16, 2009	(United States) Buffalo Bill's Star Arena, Primm, Nevada	
Win	6–0	(Mexico) Julio Valadez	KO	4 (4), 2:15	May 1, 2009	(United States) Hard Rock Hotel and Casino, Las Vegas, Nevada	
Win	5–0	(United States) Isaac Hidalgo	TKO	1 (6), 2:46	December 6, 2008	(United States) MGM Grand, Las Vegas, Nevada	
Win	4–0	(United States) Gino Escamilla	UD	6	November 5, 2008	(United States) Isleta Casino & Resort, Albuquerque, New Mexico	
Win	3–0	(Mexico) Roberto Perez	RTD	2 (4), 0:10	July 11, 2008	(United States) American Bank Center, Corpus Christi, Texas	
Win	2–0	(Puerto Rico) Luis Angel Paneto	TKO	2 (4), 0:02	February 29, 2008	(United States) Municipal Auditorium, Harlingen, Texas	
Win	1–0	(Mexico) Genaro Castorena	RTD	2 (4), 0:10	January 18, 2008	(United States) Jacob Brown Auditorium, Brownsville, Texas	
