= Moez Zemzemi =

Tunisian boxer (1975–2012)

Personal information
- Born: August 18, 1975
- Died: May 1, 2012 (aged 36)
Medal record
Men's Boxing
All-Africa Games
Bronze medal – third place	1999 Johannesburg	Bantamweight
Mediterranean Games
Bronze medal – third place	2001 Tunis	Flyweight

Moez Zemzemi (Arabic: معز زمزمي; August 18, 1975 - May 1, 2012) was a boxer from Tunisia. He represented his country at the 2000 Summer Olympics in Sydney, Australia. He was stopped in the first round of the bantamweight (– 54 kg) competition by Cuba's eventual gold medalist Guillermo Rigondeaux.

Zemzemi won bronze medals at the 1999 All-Africa Games and the 2001 Mediterranean Games.
