= Teimuraz Khurtsilava =

Georgian boxer

Theimuraz Khurtsilava
Personal information
- Full name: Theimuraz Khurtsilava
- Nationality: Georgia
- Born: 15 September 1979 (age 46)
- Height: 1.71 m (5 ft 7 1/2 in)
- Weight: 54 kg (119 lb)

Sport
- Sport: Boxing
- Weight class: Bantamweight

Theimuraz Khurtsilava (born 15 September 1979) is a retired male boxer from Georgia, who competed for his native country at the 2000 Summer Olympics in Sydney, Australia in the men's bantamweight (– 54 kg) division. There he was eliminated in the second round by Russia's eventual silver medalist Raimkul Malakhbekov.
