= Raúl Martínez (boxer) =

American boxer

Raúl Martínez (born January 21, 1982, in San Antonio, Texas) is an American former professional boxer who competed from 2004 to 2014. He challenged for the IBF flyweight title in 2009 and the IBF super-flyweight title in 2011.

== Professional career ==
Martínez fought Rodrigo Guerrero for the vacant IBF super flyweight title on 8 October 2011.
