= Taalaibek Kadiraliev =

Kyrgyzstani boxer (born 1968)

Personal information
- Nationality: Kyrgyzstani
- Born: 7 September 1968 (age 57)

Sport
- Sport: Boxing

Taalaibek Kadiraliev (born 7 September 1968) is a Kyrgyzstani former boxer. He competed in the men's bantamweight event at the 2000 Summer Olympics where he was defeated by America's Clarence Vinson 7–12.
