= Abdusalom Khasanov =

Tajikistani boxer

Medal record
Men's Boxing
Representing Tajikistan
World Amateur Championships
Bronze medal – third place	2003 Bangkok	Featherweight
Asian Games
Bronze medal – third place	2002 Busan	Bantamweight

Abdusalom Khasanov (Tajik:Абдусалом Ҳасанов) is an amateur boxer from Tajikistan.

== Career ==
He competed at the 2001 World Amateur Boxing Championships, but was stopped in the round of 16.

He won a bronze medal at bantamweight at the 2002 Asian Games.

In the Featherweight (57 kg) division he won bronze at the 2003 World Amateur Boxing Championships in Bangkok.
