= Kazumasa Tsujimoto =

Japanese boxer (born 1975)

Kazumasa Tsujimoto (辻本 和正, Tsujimoto Kazumasa) (born January 6, 1975, in Nara) is a retired boxer from Japan who represented his country at the Summer Olympics in 1996 and 2000. After having competed in the men's flyweight division (– 51 kg) in Atlanta, Georgia, he changed weights, and fought in the bantamweight class (– 54 kg) in Sydney, Australia. There he was stopped in the second round by Cuba's eventual gold medalist Guillermo Rigondeaux.
