= Boxing at the 2008 Summer Olympics – Light heavyweight =

Boxing competitions

The light heavyweight competition was the third-highest weight class featured in amateur boxing at the 2008 Summer Olympics, and was held at the Workers Indoor Arena. Light heavyweights were limited to a maximum of 81 kilograms in body mass.

Like all Olympic boxing events, the competition was a straight single-elimination tournament. Both semifinal losers were awarded bronze medals, so no boxers competed again after their first loss. Bouts consisted of four rounds of two minutes each, with one-minute breaks between rounds. Punches scored only if the white area on the front of the glove made full contact with the front of the head or torso of the opponent. Five judges scored each bout; three of the judges had to signal a scoring punch within one second for the punch to score. The winner of the bout was the boxer who scored the most valid punches by the end of the bout.

The round of 32 was marked by injury when Samoa's Farani Tavui was taken to hospital after being knocked unconscious during his first match.

== Medalists ==
Gold	Zhang Xiaoping; China
Silver	Kenneth Egan; Ireland
Bronze	Tony Jeffries; Great Britain
Bronze	Yerkebulan Shynaliyev; Kazakhstan

== Schedule ==
All times are China Standard Time (UTC+8)

Date	Time	Round
Saturday, August 9, 2008	15:30-16:30; 19:00-20:30	Round of 32
Thursday, August 14, 2008	14:30-16:30	Round of 16
Tuesday, August 19, 2008	21:01-22:00	Quarterfinals
Friday, August 22, 2008	21:01-21:30	Semifinals
Sunday, August 24, 2008	15:51-16:05	Final Bout

== Draw ==
=== Finals ===
Semifinals
1	Tony Jeffries (GBR)	3
4	Kenneth Egan (IRL)	10
3	Zhang Xiaoping (CHN)	4+
2	Yerkebuian Shynaliyev (KAZ)	4

Final
Kenneth Egan (IRL)	7
Zhang Xiaoping (CHN)	11

=== Top half ===
Round of 32
Azea Augustama (HAI)	2
Washington Silva (BRA)	6
Bastir Samir (GHA)	RSC
Dauda Izobo (NGR)
Julius Jackson (ISV)	2
Kenneth Egan (IRL)	22
Aziz Ali (KEN)	3
Bahram Muzaffer (TUR)	8

Round of 16
Eleider Álvarez (COL)	5
Tony Jeffries (GBR)	+5
Luis González (VEN)
Imre Szellő (HUN)	RSCH
Washington Silva (BRA)	9
Bastir Samir (GHA)	7
Kenneth Egan (IRL)	10
Bahram Muzaffer (TUR)	2

Quarterfinals
Tony Jeffries (GBR)	10
Imre Szellő (HUN)	2
Washington Silva (BRA)	0
Kenneth Egan (IRL)	8

Semifinals
Tony Jeffries (GBR)	3
Kenneth Egan (IRL)	10

=== Bottom half ===
Round of 32
Mourad Sahraoui (TUN)	1
Zhang Xiaoping (CHN)	3
Artur Beterbiyev (RUS)	15
Kennedy Katende (SWE)	3
Ramadan Yasser (EGY)	+10
Ramazan Magomedov (BLR)	10
Dinesh Kumar (IND)
Abdelhafid Benchabla (ALG)	RSCOS
Marijo Šivolija (CRO)	RSCH
Satupaitea Farani Tavui (SAM)
Abbos Atoev (UZB)	3
Dzhakhon Kurbanov (TJK)	11
Mehdi Ghorbani (IRI)	4
Carlos Negrón (PUR)	13
Yerkebulan Shynaliyev (KAZ)	11
Daugirdas Semiotas (LTU)	3

Round of 16
Zhang Xiaoping (CHN)	8
Artur Beterbiyev (RUS)	2
Ramadan Yasser (EGY)	6
Abdelhafid Benchabla (ALG)	13
Marijo Šivolija (CRO)	1
Dzhakhon Kurbanov (TJK)	8
Carlos Negrón (PUR)	3
Yerkebulan Shynaliyev (KAZ)	9

Quarterfinals
Zhang Xiaoping (CHN)	12
Abdelhafid Benchabla (ALG)	7
Dzhakhon Kurbanov (TJK)	DSQ
Yerkebulan Shynaliyev (KAZ)

Semifinals
Zhang Xiaoping (CHN)	4+
Yerkebulan Shynaliyev (KAZ)	4

== See also ==
- 2009 World Amateur Boxing Championships – Light heavyweight
