= Boxing at the 2000 Summer Olympics – Super heavyweight =

Boxing competitions

Men's super heavyweight boxing at the Games of the XXVII Olympiad
- Venue: Sydney Convention and Exhibition Centre
- Date: 23 September to 1 October 2000
- Competitors: 16 from 16 nations

Medalists
1st place, gold medalist(s)		Audley Harrison	Great Britain
2nd place, silver medalist(s)		Mukhtarkhan Dildabekov	Kazakhstan
3rd place, bronze medalist(s)		Paolo Vidoz	Italy
3rd place, bronze medalist(s)		Rustam Saidov	Uzbekistan

The men's super heavyweight boxing competition at the 2000 Olympic Games in Sydney was held from 23 September to 1 October at the Sydney Convention and Exhibition Centre. Being the heaviest class, super heavyweights were limited to those boxers weighing over 91 kilograms (200.6 pounds).

== Competition format ==
Like all Olympic boxing events, the competition was a straight single-elimination tournament. This event consisted of 16 boxers who have qualified for the competition through various qualifying tournaments held in 1999 and 2000. The competition began with a preliminary round on 23 September, where the number of competitors was reduced to 8, and concluded with the final on 1 October. Both semi-final losers were awarded bronze medals.

All bouts consisted of four rounds of two minutes each, with one-minute breaks between rounds. Punches scored only if the white area on the front of the glove made full contact with the front of the head or torso of the opponent. Five judges scored each bout; three of the judges had to signal a scoring punch within one second for the punch to score. The winner of the bout was the boxer who scored the most valid punches by the end of the bout.

== Competitors ==
Name	Country
Ahmed Abdel Samad	Egypt
Rustam Saidov	Uzbekistan
Art Binkowski	Canada
Michael Macaque	Mauritius
Mukhtarkhan Dildabekov	Kazakhstan
Grzegorz Kiełsa	Poland
Alexis Rubalcaba	Cuba
Cengiz Koc	Germany
Constantin Onofrei	Romania
Samuel Peter	Nigeria
Paolo Vidoz	Italy
Calvin Brock	United States
Audley Harrison	Great Britain
Alexei Lezin	Russia
Angus Shelford	New Zealand
Aleksey Masikin	Ukraine

== Schedule ==
All times are Australian Time (UTC+10)

Date	Time	Round
Saturday, September 23, 2000	13:00 & 19:30	Round of 16
Wednesday, September 27, 2000	13:00 & 19:30	Quarterfinals
Friday, September 29, 2000	19:30	Semifinals
Sunday, October 1, 2000	13:00	Final Bout

== Results ==
Round of 16
Ahmed Abdel Samad (EGY)	8
Rustam Saidov (UZB)	21
Art Binkowski (CAN)	21
Michael Macaque (MRI)	14
Mukhtarkhan Dildabekov (KAZ)	16
Grzegorz Kiełsa (POL)	5
Alexis Rubalcaba (CUB)	KO
Cengiz Koc (GER)
Constantin Onofrei (ROM)	14
Samuel Peter (NGR)	17
Paolo Vidoz (ITA)	RSC
Calvin Brock (USA)
Audley Harrison (GBR)	RSC
Alexei Lezin (RUS)
Angus Shelford (NZL)	5
Aleksey Masikin (UKR)	19

Quarter-finals
Rustam Saidov (UZB)	RSC
Art Binkowski (CAN)
Mukhtarkhan Dildabekov (KAZ)	25
Alexis Rubalcaba (CUB)	12
Samuel Peter (NGR)	3
Paolo Vidoz (ITA)	14
Audley Harrison (GBR)	19
Aleksey Masikin (UKR)	9

Semi-finals
Rustam Saidov (UZB)	22
Mukhtarkhan Dildabekov (KAZ)	28
Paolo Vidoz (ITA)	16
Audley Harrison (GBR)	32

Final
Mukhtarkhan Dildabekov (KAZ)	16
Audley Harrison (GBR)	30
