= Boxing at the 2006 Asian Games =

Boxing competitions

- Venue: Aspire Hall 5
- Dates: 2–13 December 2006
- Competitors: 192 from 32 nations

Boxing at the 2006 Asian Games took place in the Academy for Sports Excellence (ASPIRE) in Sports City, 8 kilometers to the west of Doha. The event was only open to men in eleven weight classes, and the bouts were contested over four rounds of two minutes each.

Asian Games Boxing is governed by the rules and regulations set by the amateur International Boxing Association (AIBA).

== Schedule ==
| P | Round of 32 | R | Round of 16 | ¼ | Quarterfinals | ½ | Semifinals | F | Final |

| Event↓/Date → | 2nd Sat | 3rd Sun | 4th Mon | 5th Tue | 6th Wed | 7th Thu | 8th Fri | 9th Sat | 10th Sun | 11th Mon | 12th Tue | 13th Wed |
|---|---|---|---|---|---|---|---|---|---|---|---|---|
| Men's 48 kg | P | | R | | | | ¼ | | | ½ | | F |
| Men's 51 kg | P | R | | | | ¼ | | | ½ | | F | |
| Men's 54 kg | P | | R | | | | ¼ | | | ½ | | F |
| Men's 57 kg | P | R | | | | ¼ | | | ½ | | F | |
| Men's 60 kg | P | | R | | | | | ¼ | | ½ | | F |
| Men's 64 kg | P | | | R | | ¼ | | | ½ | | F | |
| Men's 69 kg | P | | | | R | | | ¼ | | ½ | | F |
| Men's 75 kg | | | | R | | | ¼ | | ½ | | F | |
| Men's 81 kg | | | | | R | | | ¼ | | ½ | | F |
| Men's 91 kg | | | | R | | | ¼ | | ½ | | F | |
| Men's +91 kg | | | | | | | | ¼ | | ½ | | F |

== Medalists ==
| Event | Gold | Silver | Bronze |
|---|---|---|---|
| Light flyweight (48 kg) | Zou Shiming; China | Suban Pannon; Thailand | Godfrey Castro; Philippines |
| Light flyweight (48 kg) | Zou Shiming; China | Suban Pannon; Thailand | Hong Moo-won; South Korea |
| Flyweight (51 kg) | Violito Payla; Philippines | Somjit Jongjohor; Thailand | Katsuaki Susa; Japan |
| Flyweight (51 kg) | Violito Payla; Philippines | Somjit Jongjohor; Thailand | Yang Bo; China |
| Bantamweight (54 kg) | Joan Tipon; Philippines | Han Soon-chul; South Korea | Worapoj Petchkoom; Thailand |
| Bantamweight (54 kg) | Joan Tipon; Philippines | Han Soon-chul; South Korea | Enkhbatyn Badar-Uugan; Mongolia |
| Featherweight (57 kg) | Bahodirjon Sultonov; Uzbekistan | Zorigtbaataryn Enkhzorig; Mongolia | Kim Song-guk; North Korea |
| Featherweight (57 kg) | Bahodirjon Sultonov; Uzbekistan | Zorigtbaataryn Enkhzorig; Mongolia | Galib Jafarov; Kazakhstan |
| Lightweight (60 kg) | Hu Qing; China | Uranchimegiin Mönkh-Erdene; Mongolia | Genebert Basadre; Philippines |
| Lightweight (60 kg) | Hu Qing; China | Uranchimegiin Mönkh-Erdene; Mongolia | Bekzod Khidirov; Uzbekistan |
| Light welterweight (64 kg) | Manus Boonjumnong; Thailand | Shin Myung-hoon; South Korea | Dilshod Mahmudov; Uzbekistan |
| Light welterweight (64 kg) | Manus Boonjumnong; Thailand | Shin Myung-hoon; South Korea | Serik Sapiyev; Kazakhstan |
| Welterweight (69 kg) | Bakhyt Sarsekbayev; Kazakhstan | Angkhan Chomphuphuang; Thailand | Hanati Silamu; China |
| Welterweight (69 kg) | Bakhyt Sarsekbayev; Kazakhstan | Angkhan Chomphuphuang; Thailand | Mohammad Sattarpour; Iran |
| Middleweight (75 kg) | Elshod Rasulov; Uzbekistan | Bakhtiyar Artayev; Kazakhstan | Zhang Jianting; China |
| Middleweight (75 kg) | Elshod Rasulov; Uzbekistan | Bakhtiyar Artayev; Kazakhstan | Vijender Singh; India |
| Light heavyweight (81 kg) | Jahon Qurbonov; Tajikistan | Song Hak-sung; South Korea | Huzam Nabaah; Qatar |
| Light heavyweight (81 kg) | Jahon Qurbonov; Tajikistan | Song Hak-sung; South Korea | Mehdi Ghorbani; Iran |
| Heavyweight (91 kg) | Ali Mazaheri; Iran | Jasur Matchanov; Uzbekistan | Dmitriy Gotfrid; Kazakhstan |
| Heavyweight (91 kg) | Ali Mazaheri; Iran | Jasur Matchanov; Uzbekistan | Nasser Al-Shami; Syria |
| Super heavyweight (+91 kg) | Rustam Saidov; Uzbekistan | Mukhtarkhan Dildabekov; Kazakhstan | Varghese Johnson; India |
| Super heavyweight (+91 kg) | Rustam Saidov; Uzbekistan | Mukhtarkhan Dildabekov; Kazakhstan | Jasem Delavari; Iran |

== Medal table ==
| Rank | Nation | Gold | Silver | Bronze | Total |
|---|---|---|---|---|---|
| 1 | Uzbekistan (UZB) | 3 | 1 | 2 | 6 |
| 2 | China (CHN) | 2 | 0 | 3 | 5 |
| 3 | Philippines (PHI) | 2 | 0 | 2 | 4 |
| 4 | Thailand (THA) | 1 | 3 | 1 | 5 |
| 5 | Kazakhstan (KAZ) | 1 | 2 | 3 | 6 |
| 6 | Iran (IRI) | 1 | 0 | 3 | 4 |
| 7 | Tajikistan (TJK) | 1 | 0 | 0 | 1 |
| 8 | South Korea (KOR) | 0 | 3 | 1 | 4 |
| 9 | Mongolia (MGL) | 0 | 2 | 1 | 3 |
| 10 | India (IND) | 0 | 0 | 2 | 2 |
| 11 | Japan (JPN) | 0 | 0 | 1 | 1 |
| 11 | North Korea (PRK) | 0 | 0 | 1 | 1 |
| 11 | Qatar (QAT) | 0 | 0 | 1 | 1 |
| 11 | Syria (SYR) | 0 | 0 | 1 | 1 |
| Totals (14 entries) | | 11 | 11 | 22 | 44 |

== Participating nations ==
A total of 192 athletes from 32 nations competed in boxing at the 2006 Asian Games:

- Afghanistan (4)
- China (10)
- Chinese Taipei (4)
- India (10)
- Iran (10)
- Iraq (5)
- Japan (3)
- Jordan (2)
- Kazakhstan (10)
- Kuwait (2)
- Kyrgyzstan (10)
- Laos (3)
- Lebanon (3)
- Macau (5)
- Malaysia (3)
- Mongolia (7)
- Nepal (1)
- North Korea (4)
- Pakistan (10)
- Philippines (7)
- Qatar (8)
- Saudi Arabia (5)
- South Korea (10)
- Sri Lanka (6)
- Syria (7)
- Tajikistan (10)
- Thailand (8)
- Timor-Leste (2)
- Turkmenistan (5)
- United Arab Emirates (3)
- Uzbekistan (10)
- Vietnam (5)
