= Boxing at the 2006 Asian Games – Men's 81 kg =

Boxing competitions

Men's 81 kg at the 2006 Asian Games
- Venue: Aspire Hall 5
- Date: 6–13 December 2006
- Competitors: 12 from 12 nations

Medalists
gold medal	Jahon Qurbonov	Tajikistan
silver medal	Song Hak-sung	South Korea
bronze medal	Huzam Nabaah	Qatar
bronze medal	Mehdi Ghorbani	Iran

The men's light heavyweight (81 kilograms) event at the 2006 Asian Games took place from 6 to 13 December 2006 at Aspire Hall 5, Doha, Qatar.

== Schedule ==
All times are Arabia Standard Time (UTC+03:00)

Date	Time	Event
Wednesday, 6 December 2006	14:00	Preliminary
Saturday, 9 December 2006	14:00	Quarterfinals
Monday, 11 December 2006	14:00	Semifinals
Wednesday, 13 December 2006	14:00	Final

== Results ==
Legend

- RSCH — Won by referee stop contest head blow
- RSCO — Won by referee stop contest outscored

Preliminary
Zhang Xiaoping (CHN)	13
Jahon Qurbonov (TJK)	23
Yerdos Zhanabergenov (KAZ)	RSCH
Mohammad Sadeq Mirzaei (AFG)
Mehdi Ghorbani (IRI)	RSCO
Salem Al-Shemmari (KUW)
Rami Zock (LIB)	3
Utkirbek Haydarov (UZB)	25

Quarterfinals
Muhammad Nadir Khan (PAK)
Huzam Nabaah (QAT)	RSCO
Kymbatbek Ryskulov (KGZ)
Song Hak-sung (KOR)	RSCO
Jahon Qurbonov (TJK)	33
Yerdos Zhanabergenov (KAZ)	21
Mehdi Ghorbani (IRI)	31
Utkirbek Haydarov (UZB)	18

Semifinals
Huzam Nabaah (QAT)	15
Song Hak-sung (KOR)	29
Jahon Qurbonov (TJK)	RSCO
Mehdi Ghorbani (IRI)

Final
Song Hak-sung (KOR)	15
Jahon Qurbonov (TJK)	30
