= Tajikistan national amateur boxing athletes =

Tajikistan national amateur boxing athletes represent Tajikistan in regional, continental and world tournaments and matches sanctioned by the Amateur International Boxing Association (AIBA).

== Olympics ==
Year	Venue	Medalists		
Year	Venue	Gold	Silver	Bronze
1996	Atlanta	-	-	-
2000	Sydney	No Tajikistani boxers competed		
2004	Athens	-	-	-
2008	Beijing	-	-	-
2012	London	-	-	Mavzuna Chorieva
2016	Rio de Janeiro	-	-	-

== Asian Games ==
Year	Venue	Medalists		
Year	Venue	Gold	Silver	Bronze
1994	Hiroshima	No Tajikistani boxers competed		
1998	Bangkok	No Tajikistani boxers competed		
2002	Busan	-	-	Abdusalom Khasanov; Mekhrodj Umarov
2006	Doha	Jahon Qurbonov	-	-
2010	Guangzhou	-	-	Jahon Qurbonov
2014	Incheon	-	-	-
