= Samoa at the 2008 Summer Olympics =

- IOC code: SAM
- NOC: Samoa Association of Sports and National Olympic Committee Inc.
- Website: www.oceaniasport.com/samoa

in Beijing
- Competitors: 6 in 5 sports
- Flag bearers: Ele Opeloge (opening); Aunese Curreen (closing)
- Medals Ranked 70th: Gold 0 Silver 1 Bronze 0 Total 1

Summer Olympics appearances (overview)
- 1984; 1988; 1992; 1996; 2000; 2004; 2008; 2012; 2016; 2020; 2024; 2028

Samoa sent a delegation to compete at the 2008 Summer Olympics in Beijing, China. The country was represented by a total of six athletes. The country's flagbearer during the Games' opening ceremony was weightlifter Ele Opeloge. Samoa won its first Olympic medal due to medals reallocation after the IOC's retesting of doping samples in 2016.

== Medalists ==
Medal	Name	Sport	Event	Date
Silver	Ele Opeloge	Weightlifting	Women's +75 kg	August 16

== Archery ==
Samoa sent an archer to the Olympics for the first time. Joseph Muaausa earned the nation's first Olympic archery qualifying spot, in the men's competition, by placing second in the 2008 Oceanian championship.

Athlete	Event	Ranking round		Round of 64	Round of 32	Round of 16	Quarterfinals	Semifinals	Final / BM	
Athlete	Event	Score	Seed	Opposition Score	Opposition Score	Opposition Score	Opposition Score	Opposition Score	Opposition Score	Rank
Joseph Muaausa	Men's individual	563	64	Serrano (MEX) (1); L 88–116	Did not advance					

== Athletics ==
Aunese Curreen set a national record in the men's 800 metres, with a time of 1:47.45.

Men

Athlete	Event	Heat		Semifinal		Final	
Athlete	Event	Result	Rank	Result	Rank	Result	Rank
Aunese Curreen	800 m	1:47.45 NR	6	Did not advance			

Women

Athlete	Event	Qualification		Final	
Athlete	Event	Distance	Position	Distance	Position
Serafina Akeli	Javelin throw	49.26	49	Did not advance	

Key

- Note–Ranks given for track events are within the athlete's heat only
- Q = Qualified for the next round
- q = Qualified for the next round as a fastest loser or, in field events, by position without achieving the qualifying target
- NR = National record
- N/A = Round not applicable for the event
- Bye = Athlete not required to compete in round

== Boxing ==
Samoa qualified one boxer for the Olympic boxing tournament. Satupaitea Farani Tavui earned Oceania's qualifying spot in the light heavyweight class by winning the Oceanian continental qualifying tournament. Tavui lost his first match against Croatia's Marijo Šivolija, being eliminated by knockout. He had to be taken to hospital.

Athlete	Event	Round of 32	Round of 16	Quarterfinals	Semifinals	Final	
Athlete	Event	Opposition Result	Opposition Result	Opposition Result	Opposition Result	Opposition Result	Rank
Satupaitea Farani Tavui	Light heavyweight	Šivolija (CRO); L RSC	Did not advance				

== Canoeing ==
=== Sprint ===
Athlete	Event	Heats		Semifinals		Final	
Athlete	Event	Time	Rank	Time	Rank	Time	Rank
Rudolph Berking-Williams	Men's K-1 500 m	1:47.839	8 QS	DNS		Did not advance	
Rudolph Berking-Williams	Men's K-1 1000 m	4:00.784	7 QS	4:04.658	9	Did not advance	

Qualification Legend: QS = Qualify to semi-final; QF = Qualify directly to final

== Weightlifting ==
Athlete	Event	Snatch		Clean & Jerk		Total	Rank
Athlete	Event	Result	Rank	Result	Rank	Total	Rank
Ele Opeloge	Women's +75 kg	119	2	150	3	269	2nd place, silver medalist(s)
