= Boxing at the 2002 Asian Games – Men's +91 kg =

Boxing competitions

Men's +91 kg at the 2002 Asian Games
- Venue: Masan Gymnasium
- Date: 6–13 October 2002
- Competitors: 9 from 9 nations

Medalists
gold medal	Rustam Saidov	Uzbekistan
silver medal	Mukhtarkhan Dildabekov	Kazakhstan
bronze medal	Zhang Junlong	China
bronze medal	Muzaffar Iqbal Mirza	Pakistan

The men's super heavyweight (+91 kilograms) event at the 2002 Asian Games took place from 6 to 13 October 2002 at Masan Gymnasium, Masan, South Korea.

== Schedule ==
All times are Korea Standard Time (UTC+09:00)

Date	Time	Event
Sunday, 6 October 2002	14:00	Preliminary
Monday, 7 October 2002	14:00	Quarterfinals
Friday, 11 October 2002	14:00	Semifinals
Sunday, 13 October 2002	14:00	Final

== Results ==
Legend

- RSCI — Won by referee stop contest injury
- RSCO — Won by referee stop contest outclassed

Preliminary
Ali Mansour (LIB)	16
Harpal Singh (IND)	20

Quarterfinals
Mukhtarkhan Dildabekov (KAZ)	26
Lee Kang-un (KOR)	12
Pan Min-nan (TPE)
Zhang Junlong (CHN)	RSCO
Ruslan Avasov (KGZ)	8
Muzaffar Iqbal Mirza (PAK)	24
Rustam Saidov (UZB)	RSCO
Harpal Singh (IND)

Semifinals
Mukhtarkhan Dildabekov (KAZ)	28
Zhang Junlong (CHN)	19
Muzaffar Iqbal Mirza (PAK)
Rustam Saidov (UZB)	RSCI

Final
Mukhtarkhan Dildabekov (KAZ)	21
Rustam Saidov (UZB)	29
