= Boxing at the 2006 Asian Games – Men's 51 kg =

Boxing competitions

Men's 51 kg at the 2006 Asian Games
- Venue: Aspire Hall 5
- Date: 2–12 December 2006
- Competitors: 20 from 20 nations

Medalists
gold medal	Violito Payla	Philippines
silver medal	Somjit Jongjohor	Thailand
bronze medal	Katsuaki Susa	Japan
bronze medal	Yang Bo	China

The men's flyweight (51 kilograms) event at the 2006 Asian Games took place from 2 to 12 December 2006 at Aspire Hall 5, Doha, Qatar.

== Schedule ==
All times are Arabia Standard Time (UTC+03:00)

Date	Time	Event
Saturday, 2 December 2006	14:00	Qualification
Sunday, 3 December 2006	14:00	Preliminary
Thursday, 7 December 2006	14:00	Quarterfinals
Sunday, 10 December 2006	14:00	Semifinals
Tuesday, 12 December 2006	14:00	Final

== Results ==
Legend

- RSCO — Won by referee stop contest outscored

=== Final ===
Final
Somjit Jongjohor (THA)	15
Violito Payla (PHI)	31

=== Top half ===
Qualification

Preliminary
Chamila Prasad Abeyratne (SRI)	33
Mohammed Al-Salem (KSA)	21
Katsuaki Susa (JPN)	RSCO
Majeed Kettan (IRQ)
Anvar Yunusov (TJK)	20
Somjit Jongjohor (THA)	25
Mirat Sarsembayev (KAZ)	25
Pürevdorjiin Serdamba (MGL)	3

Quarterfinals
Chamila Prasad Abeyratne (SRI)
Katsuaki Susa (JPN)	RSCO
Somjit Jongjohor (THA)	20
Mirat Sarsembayev (KAZ)	11

Semifinals
Katsuaki Susa (JPN)
Somjit Jongjohor (THA)	RSCO

=== Bottom half ===
Qualification
Violito Payla (PHI)	33
Omran Akbari (IRI)	13
Othman Arbabi (QAT)	8
Trần Quốc Việt (VIE)	28
Kam Wai Tong (MAC)	14
Nauman Karim (PAK)	28
Kwak Hyok-ju (PRK)	7
Jitender Kumar (IND)	22

Preliminary
Lee Ok-sung (KOR)	24
Avazbek Abdullaev (KGZ)	18
Yang Bo (CHN)	20
Nhothin Holapatiphone (LAO)	7
Violito Payla (PHI)	35
Trần Quốc Việt (VIE)	11
Nauman Karim (PAK)	6
Jitender Kumar (IND)	14

Quarterfinals
Lee Ok-sung (KOR)	21
Yang Bo (CHN)	41
Violito Payla (PHI)	RSCO
Jitender Kumar (IND)

Semifinals
Yang Bo (CHN)
Violito Payla (PHI)	RSCO
