= Kenny Egan =

Irish boxer and politician

Kenneth Egan
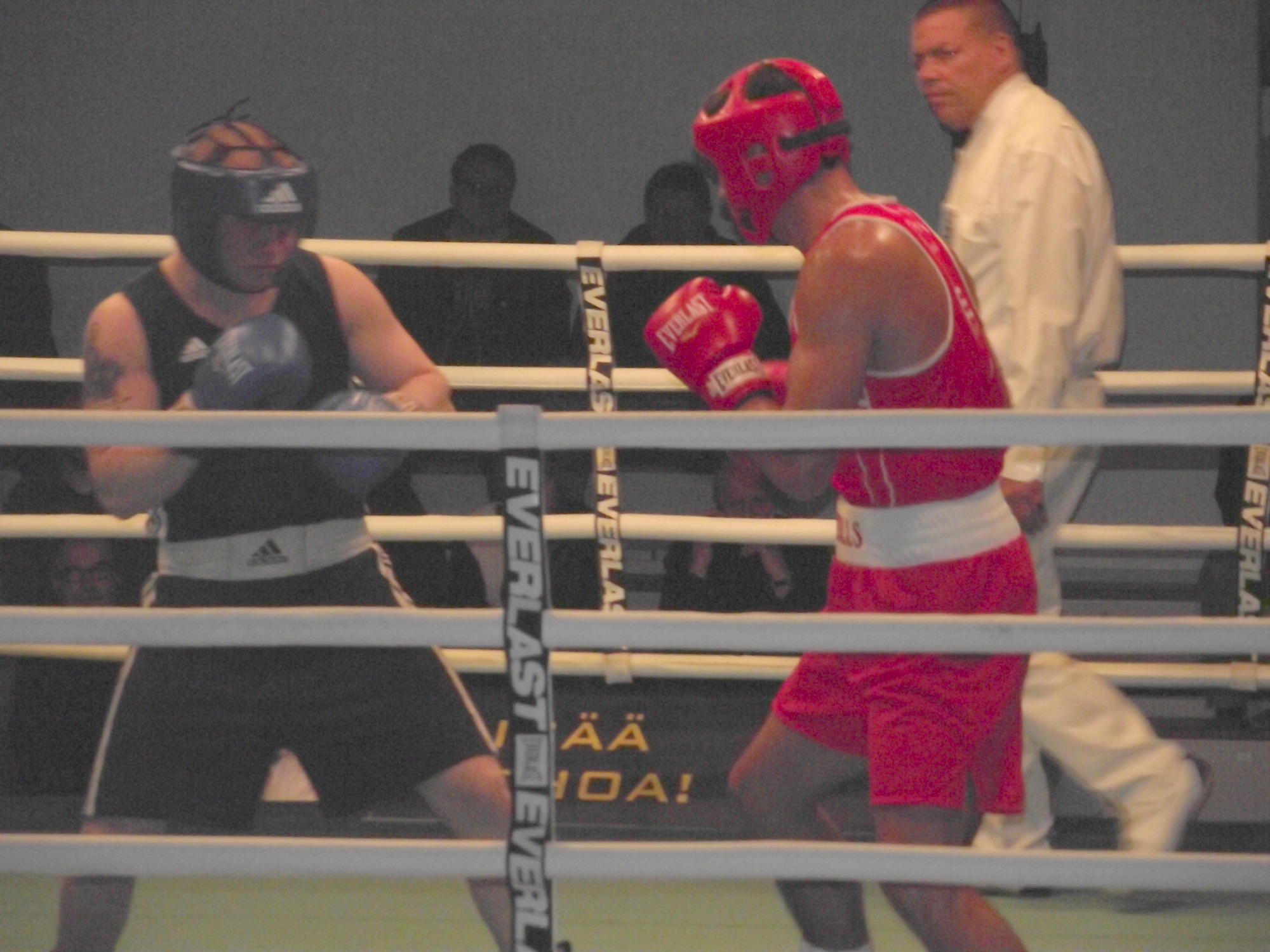
- Egan (right) vs. Sinkevich in Gee Bee 2011

Personal information
- Nickname: Kenny
- Nationality: Irish
- Born: Kenneth Egan; 7 January 1982 (age 44) Clondalkin, Dublin, Ireland
- Height: 6 ft 2 in (1.88 m)
- Weight: Light-Heavyweight

Boxing career
- Stance: Southpaw

Boxing record
- Total fights: 2
- Wins: 1
- Win by KO: 0
- Losses: 0
- Draws: 1
- No contests: 0

Kenny Egan
Medal record

Representing Ireland

Men's Boxing

2008 Olympic Games
Silver medal – second place	2008 Beijing	Light-Heavyweight

European Amateur Championships
Bronze medal – third place	2006 Plovdiv	Light-Heavyweight
Bronze medal – third place	2010 Moscow	Light-Heavyweight

EU Amateur Championships
Gold medal – first place	2005 Cagliari	Light-Heavyweight
Gold medal – first place	2007 Dublin	Light-Heavyweight
Gold medal – first place	2008 Centriewo	Light-Heavyweight
Bronze medal – third place	2006 Pecs	Light-Heavyweight
Bronze medal – third place	2009 Odense	Light-Heavyweight

Kenneth Egan (born 7 January 1982) is an Irish politician and boxer from Clondalkin, Dublin best known for winning a silver medal in the final of the 81 kg, Light-Heavyweight boxing final at the 2008 Olympics. He won the European Gold Medal in the 2008 Athens Olympic Qualifiers and a European Bronze Medal in 2006 and 2010 at Light-heavyweight. He was elected to South Dublin County Council for Fine Gael in the 2014 local elections.

== Career ==
Egan fought out of the Neilstown Boxing Club that is based in Dublin. He fought in the 81 kg class that is more commonly known in boxing circles as Light-Heavyweight. Egan won the national championships from 2005 to 2007, where he twice beat Darren O'Neill in the final. In all he has won 10 Irish titles, including 7 light-heavyweight belts. Egan announced his retirement following a defeat to Westmeath's Joe Ward in the National Stadium, 22 Feb 2013.

=== 2006 European Amateur Boxing Championships – Bulgaria ===
At the 2006 European Amateur Boxing Championships in Plovdiv, Bulgaria he lost his semifinal to Russian eventual winner Artur Beterbiyev.

==== Results ====
- Defeated Robert Woge (Germany) RSCO 2
- Defeated Mamadou Diambang (France) RSCO 3
- Beaten by Artur Beterbiyev (Russia) RSCO 2

=== 2007 World Amateur Boxing Championships, Chicago ===
At the 2007 World Amateur Boxing Championships held at the University of Illinois Chicago's UIC Pavilion. He beat Julius Jackson and Julio Castillo then lost to Marijo Sivolija.

==== Results ====
- Defeated Julius Jackson (Virgin Islands) RSCO 2
- Defeated Julio Castillo (Ecuador) 16–10
- Beaten by Marijo Sivolija (Croatia) 17–9

=== Beijing 2008 Olympics campaign ===
At the first Olympic qualifier the southpaw was upset by Ramazan Magomedov, at the second he beat four fighters including Kennedy Katende and made it to Beijing.

At the 2008 Olympics he once again defeated Julius Jackson from The Virgin Islands in the round of 32. In the round of 16 he defeated Bahram Muzaffer, the Turkish boxer, before overcoming Brazilian Washington Silva in the quarter-final. This third victory guaranteed Egan and Ireland a medal, the third medal secured following Paddy Barnes and Darren Sutherland's advancement to the semi-finals. Egan beat Tony Jeffries, the British boxer, in the semi-final round. He lost to China's Xiaoping Zhang in the Olympic Final Gold Medal match in Beijing on Sunday 24 August 2008.

==== European Olympic Qualifications – Pescara, Italy ====
- Defeated Myasnik Sargsyan (Armenia) RSCO 3
- Defeated Emil Krastev (Bulgaria) 29–8
- Beaten by Ramazan Magomedov (Belarus) 17–13

==== European Olympic Qualifications – Athens, Greece ====
- Defeated Alessandro Sinacore (Italy) 23–14
- Defeated Daniel Kooij (Netherlands) 13–4
- Defeated Gottlieb Weiss (Germany) 21–11
- Defeated Kennedy Katende (Sweden) 15–10

==== 2008 Olympic results ====
- Defeated Julius Jackson (Virgin Islands) 22–2
- Defeated Bahram Muzaffer (Turkey) 10–2
- Defeated Washington Silva (Brazil) 8–0
- Defeated Tony Jeffries (Great Britain) 10–3
- Beaten by Xiaoping Zhang (China) 11–7

==== Tributes ====
Following the final President Mary McAleese and Taoiseach Brian Cowen gave Egan some tributes.

"I am delighted to learn of Kenny's wonderful accomplishment today in Beijing," the President said. "The people of Ireland are uplifted by this outstanding achievement which continues a tradition of Irish Olympic boxing excellence dating back to 1952."

Cowen echoed these remarks by saying "Kenny fought a brave fight and gave everything in a wonderful bout of top class boxing".

==== Final controversy ====
At the end of the third round in the gold medal contest between Egan and Xiaoping, the judges failed to score several punches landed by Egan that would have given him the lead. NBC announcers concurred on this point. The scoring system throughout the Olympics had been the topic of many debates, not only in this bout, but throughout many of the games. Irish bookmaker, Paddy Power, paid out all bets on Egan to win the gold, despite this not being the actual result.

=== Post Olympics ===
Kenny returned home from the Olympics with the rest of the Olympic team at Dublin Airport and went back to Clondalkin to a hero's welcome. Since the Olympics, he has become a popular figure in Ireland and has appeared on TV chat shows and advertisements, and has been a part of the celebrity scene in Ireland. In November 2008 he released a DVD titled "Kenny Egan – Back from Beijing" which chronicles his journey to the silver medal in Beijing.

On Friday 28 February 2009 he was scheduled to fight at the national stadium in a match against the US, but he failed to turn up for the fight and appeared to have left the country, with more reports of him having left the country due to messages left on social networking site Twitter. On Tuesday 3 March it was reported that he was in New York City and would return in a couple of days. He released a statement apologising to his teammates for the non-show against the US and for disappearing to New York. He also pulled out of the undercard programme of Bernard Dunnes's World Title Fight Night at The O2 arena Dublin on Saturday 21 March, admitting that he would not be ready for it.

On 17 July 2009, Egan was back in action at the National Stadium where he outpointed Crumlin light middleweight Darren Cruise, who retired at the start of round three when Egan was in the lead 16–2, in the Open Senior Light Heavyweight final. On 1 August 2009, Egan lost a match to Sweden's Babacar Kamara. He won the bronze medal at the 2010 European Amateur Boxing Championships at Moscow, Russia after he lost to Abdelkader Bouhenia from France in the semifinals.

In January 2011, Egan publicly said he suffers from a drink problem and has gotten help. "I was drinking too much. I was in a bad place. I was drinking too much. Ever since I got back from the games I just went mad on it and didn't stop" he said. In February 2012 his long-time girlfriend Sharon McHugh, who was credited with helping him get back on the straight and narrow, called time on their 18-month relationship. In 2012, Egan was an analyst on the 2012 Olympics boxing coverage on RTÉ Sport. Egan was beaten by Joe Ward for the third consecutive time in the Elite Senior Finals in February 2013. The defeat forced Egan to retire. Westmeath powerhouse Ward credited Egan on the night but also said that he (Egan), was "the second best boxer in Ireland".

==== COVID-19 controversy ====
In August 2020, Egan breached public health guidelines during the COVID-19 pandemic. It emerged that Egan failed to restrict his movements when he returned from a boxing event in Essex, England in early August 2020. He flew home to Ireland on August 15, according to a tweet on his Twitter page. However, it was later reported that Egan travelled to County Cork on August 22, just seven days later - public health guidelines at that time stated clearly that individuals who travel from countries that were not on the green list, such as Britain, must restrict their movements for 14 days when they arrive in Ireland.

Egan, a serving Dublin councillor at the time, subsequently resigned the Fine Gael party whip.

Egan was a pundit on RTÉ for the coverage of the Tokyo 2020 Olympic Boxing events.

== Politics ==
In February 2014, Egan confirmed that he would be running in the 2014 local elections as a Fine Gael candidate in the Clondalkin area. He was subsequently elected. In December 2014 he got engaged to girlfriend Karen O'Sullivan. In October 2015 he announced on Twitter the birth of their daughter Kate. He was re-elected at the 2019 local elections. He did not contest the 2024 local elections.

== Therapy and counselling ==
Kenneth Egan pursued a career in psychotherapy and counselling in 2018, having been awarded a BA (Hons) in integrative counselling & psychotherapy and a higher diploma in addiction studies, he began to practice as a counsellor based in his native Clondalkin. He helps people with motivation, resilience, leadership, alcohol misuse & abuse/addiction, mental health, therapy, health & well-being and trauma.
