= Boxing at the 2006 Asian Games – Men's +91 kg =

Boxing competitions

Men's +91 kg at the 2006 Asian Games
- Venue: Aspire Hall 5
- Date: 9–13 December 2006
- Competitors: 8 from 8 nations

Medalists
| gold medal | Rustam Saidov | Uzbekistan |
| silver medal | Mukhtarkhan Dildabekov | Kazakhstan |
| bronze medal | Varghese Johnson | India |
| bronze medal | Jasem Delavari | Iran |

The men's super heavyweight (+91 kilograms) event at the 2006 Asian Games took place from 9 to 13 December 2006 at Aspire Hall 5, Doha, Qatar.

== Schedule ==
All times are Arabia Standard Time (UTC+03:00)

| Date | Time | Event |
|---|---|---|
| Saturday, 9 December 2006 | 14:00 | Quarterfinals |
| Monday, 11 December 2006 | 14:00 | Semifinals |
| Wednesday, 13 December 2006 | 14:00 | Final |

== Results ==
Legend

- RET — Won by retirement
- RSCO — Won by referee stop contest outscored
- WO — Won by walkover

Quarterfinals
Varghese Johnson (IND) | WO
Ibrahim Al-Zaabi (UAE)
Mukhtarkhan Dildabekov (KAZ) | 46
Mir Wais Khan (PAK) | 22
Ahmad Sheikh Ismael (SYR) | 13
Jasem Delavari (IRI) | 26
Rustam Saidov (UZB) | RSCO
Nurpais Torobekov (KGZ)

Semifinals
Varghese Johnson (IND)
Mukhtarkhan Dildabekov (KAZ) | RET
Jasem Delavari (IRI)
Rustam Saidov (UZB) | RSCO

Final
Mukhtarkhan Dildabekov (KAZ)
Rustam Saidov (UZB) | RSCO
