= 2005 European Union Amateur Boxing Championships =

Boxing competitions

2005 Men's European Union Boxing Championships
- Host city: Sardinia
- Country: Italy
- Athletes: 92
- Dates: 4–11 June

The Men's 2005 European Union Amateur Boxing Championships were held in Cagliari, Sardinia, Italy from June 4 to June 11. The 3rd edition of the annual competition was organised by the European governing body for amateur boxing, EABA. A total number of 92 fighters from across Europe competed at these championships.

== Medal winners ==
Event	Gold	Silver	Bronze
Light Flyweight (– 48 kilograms)	Alfonso Pinto; Italy	Iulius Poczo; Romania	Krastan Krastanov; Bulgaria Łukasz Maszczyk; Poland
Flyweight (– 51 kilograms)	Sofiane Takoucht; France	Andrzej Rżany; Poland	Salim Salimov; Bulgaria Don Broadhurst; England
Bantamweight (– 54 kilograms)	Detelin Dalakliev; Bulgaria	Daniel Enache; Romania	Ozgur Yildirim; Turkey Wilhelm Gratschow; Germany
Featherweight (– 57 kilograms)	Alexey Shaydulin; Bulgaria	Daouda Sow; France	Vasile Sandu; Romania Andrzej Liczik; Poland
Lightweight (– 60 kilograms)	Domenico Valentino; Italy	Krzysztof Szot; Poland	Filip Palic; Croatia Frankie Gavin; England
Light Welterweight (– 64 kilograms)	Gyula Kate; Hungary	Carmine Cirillo; Italy	Önder Şipal; Turkey Mariusz Koperski; Poland
Welterweight (– 69 kilograms)	Neil Perkins; England	Istvan Szili; Hungary	Borna Katalinic; Croatia Aleksandrs Sotniks; Latvia
Middleweight (– 75 kilograms)	Nikolais Grisunins; Latvia	Gary Barr; England	Artur Zwarycz; Poland Ronald Gavril; Romania
Light Heavyweight (– 81 kilograms)	(Republic of Ireland) Kenneth Egan; Ireland	Marijo Šivolija; Croatia	Istvan Szucs; Hungary Tony Jeffries; England
Heavyweight (– 91 kilograms)	Clemente Russo; Italy	Lukas Viktora; Czech Republic	Vedran Djipalo; Croatia Alexander Povernov; Germany
Super Heavyweight (+ 91 kilograms)	Roberto Cammarelle; Italy	Kubrat Pulev; Bulgaria	Csaba Kurtucz; Hungary Kurban Gunebakan; Turkey
