= David Cadieux =

Canadian boxer (born 1974)

Personal information
- Full name: David Cadieux
- Nationality: Canada
- Born: November 25, 1974 (age 51) Saint-Jean-sur-Richelieu, Quebec
- Height: 6 ft 6 in (198 cm)
- Weight: 91 kg (201 lb)

Sport
- Sport: Boxing
- Weight class: Light Heavyweight
Medal record
Commonwealth Games
Silver medal – second place	2002 Manchester	Super Heavyweight

David Cadieux (born November 25, 1974) is a Canadian professional boxer. As an amateur, he won the silver medal at the 2002 Commonwealth Games.

== Career ==
As a professional boxer, on May 12, 2006, at the Aréna Jacques Plante, Cadieux won the Canadian belt stopping former Canuck champion Patrice L'Heureux at the very beginning of the 7th round by a powerful left hook on the side of the head dropping him down for the 4th and last time of the evening. In 2007 he lost the national title to Raymond Olubowale by KO.

== Professional boxing record ==
17 Wins (12 knockouts, 5 decisions), 3 Losses (1 knockout, 2 decisions), 1 No Contest
Result	Record	Opponent	Type	Round	Date	Location	Notes
Loss	4-1-1	(Canada) Raymond Olubowale	TKO	6	21/09/2007	Trois-Rivieres, Quebec, Canada	Canada Heavyweight Title. Referee stopped the bout at 1:53 of the sixth round.
Win	14-18	(United States) Wade Lewis	TKO	1	03/08/2007	Montreal, Quebec, Canada	Referee stopped the bout at 2:48 of the first round.
Loss	14-2	(France) Josue Blocus	SD	12	12/05/2007	Montreal, Quebec, Canada	WBO NABO Heavyweight Title.
Win	18-6-2	(United States) Ray Lunsford	TKO	1	14/04/2007	Montreal, Quebec, Canada	Referee stopped the bout at 1:56 of the first round.
Win	30-19-3	(United States) Ross Puritty	UD	10	10/02/2007	Montreal, Quebec, Canada	
Win	20-2-1	(Canada) Patrice L'Heureux	UD	12	18/11/2006	Trois-Rivieres, Quebec, Canada	Canada/CQB Heavyweight Titles.
Win	39-16	(Brazil) Rogerio Lobo	RTD	4	23/06/2006	Montreal, Quebec, Canada	
Win	19-1-1	(Canada) Patrice L'Heureux	KO	7	12/05/2006	Shawinigan, Quebec, Canada	Canada/CQB Heavyweight Titles. Patrice knocked out at 0:23 of the seventh round.
Win	6-1	(United States) Matthew Greer	UD	8	11/02/2006	Montreal, Quebec, Canada	
Win	14-8	(United States) Marcus McGee	UD	8	10/12/2005	Montreal, Quebec, Canada	
Win	8-9	(United States) Demetrice King	UD	8	01/10/2005	Trois-Rivieres, Quebec, Canada	
Win	3-2	(United States) Clinton Boldridge	TKO	2	18/06/2005	Montreal, Quebec, Canada	Referee stopped the bout at 2:08 of the second round.
Win	3-0	(Canada) Raymond Olubowale	KO	5	16/04/2005	Victoriaville, Quebec, Canada	Raymond knocked out at 2:15 of the fifth round.
Win	8-10-1	(United States) Vernon Woodward	KO	1	12/03/2005	Montreal, Quebec, Canada	Woodward knocked out at 1:44 of the first round.
Win	6-28-1	(Canada) Marcelo Aravena	TKO	2	03/03/2005	Montreal, Quebec, Canada	Referee stopped the bout at 1:15 of the second round.
Win	7-2	(United States) William Cook	TKO	1	12/02/2005	Montreal, Quebec, Canada	Referee stopped the bout at 1:03 of the first round.
Win	2-0	(United States) Robert Murphy	KO	1	17/12/2004	Montreal, Quebec, Canada	Murphy knocked out at 1:17 of the first round.
Win	3-2-1	(United States) Matt Anderson	TKO	3	13/11/2004	Montreal, Quebec, Canada	Referee stopped the bout at 2:38 of the third round.
Win	--	(United States) Monte Cutshall	KO	1	09/10/2004	Montreal, Quebec, Canada	Cutshall knocked out at 1:45 of the first round.
Loss	1-1	(Romania) Claudio Rasco	SD	4	29/09/2004	Montreal, Quebec, Canada	
No Contest	0-4	(United States) Daryl Smith	NC	2	11/09/2004	Montreal, Quebec, Canada	Referee stopped the bout at 2:50 of the second round due to a severe cut caused by an accidental headbutt.
