= Varghese Johnson =

Indian boxer

Medal record

Men's Boxing

Representing India

Asian Games
Bronze medal – third place	Doha 2006	Super Heavyweight

Varghese Johnson (born April 28, 1982) is an amateur boxer from India who repeatedly medaled in the Super Heavyweight (+ 91 kg) division.

== Career ==
In Melbourne at the Commonwealth Games 2006 he won Bronze, losing to David Price, who arose from three knockdowns to stop Johnson.

At the 2006 Asian Games he also won the bronze medal in a lost bout against Kazakhstan's Mukhtarkhan Dildabekov 13–32.
