= Patrice L'Heureux =

Canadian boxer (1972–2018)

Personal information
- Nickname: Le Granit
- Born: Patrice L'Heureux; 1 February 1972 Grand-Mère, Quebec, Canada
- Died: 7 October 2018 (aged 46)
- Height: 6 ft 5 in (1.96 m)
- Weight: Heavyweight

Boxing career
- Reach: 81 in (205.7 cm)
- Stance: Orthodox

Boxing record
- Total fights: 29
- Wins: 24
- Win by KO: 13
- Losses: 4
- Draws: 1
- No contests: 0

Patrice L'Heureux (1 February 1972 – 7 October 2018) was a Canadian professional boxer.

== Amateur ==
L'Heureux participated in the 1999 Pan American Games but was knocked out by Alexis Rubalcaba.

== Professional career ==
On 13 November 2004, L'Heureux challenged Steve McKay (record 5–1) for the vacant Canadian heavyweight championship in Montreal. After knocking down McKay in the eighth round with a body shot, L'Heureux then knocked him out for good 27 seconds into the ninth round. However, in his first fight after winning the prestigious title in 2005, L'Heureux was viciously pummelled by American clubfighter Steve Pannell (33-8) to lose his undefeated ring record by a technical knock out at 2:31 of the first round. He beat undefeated Olympian Art Binkowski on points later that year.

The 6-foot 5-inch tall right-hander suffered his second loss when he was knocked out in the seventh round by David Cadieux on 12 May 2006. He lost the rematch on points. On 26 May 2007, he suffered his fourth loss to the undefeated Alexander Povetkin by a knockout in the second round. L'Heureux subsequently won four straight fights including two fights against Stephane Tessier. His first fight with Tessier earned L'Heureux the Quebec Boxing Council (CQB) Heavyweight Title. He died of a heart attack on 7 October 2018, aged 46.

== Professional boxing record ==
24 Wins (13 knockouts, 11 decisions), 5 Losses (4 knockouts, 1 decision), 1 Draw Archived August 15, 2013, at the Wayback Machine
Result	Record	Opponent	Type	Round	Date	Location	Notes
Loss	3-0	(Canada) Wayne John	TKO	5	11 June 2010	Montreal, Quebec, Canada	Referee stopped the bout at 2:22 of the fifth round.
Win	3-20-1	(Canada) Stephane Tessier	SD	8	14 May 2009	Trois-Rivières, Quebec, Canada	CQB Canada Heavyweight Title.
Win	11-16-2	(United States) Joe Stofle	TKO	5	4 April 2009	Montreal, Quebec, Canada	Referee stopped the bout at 1:12 of the fifth round.
Win	19-22-2	(Canada) Ken Murphy	UD	6	5 April 2008	Montreal, Quebec, Canada	
Win	3-12	(Canada) Stephane Tessier	UD	8	21 September 2007	Trois-Rivières, Quebec, Canada	CQB Canada Heavyweight Title.
Loss	11-0	(Russia) Alexander Povetkin	KO	2	26 May 2007	Bamberg, Germany	Patrice knocked out at 1:02 of the second round.
Loss	13-1	(Canada) David Cadieux	UD	12	18 November 2006	Trois-Rivières, Quebec, Canada	CQB Canada/Canada Heavyweight Title.
Win	14-15	(United States) Travis Fulton	TKO	3	30 September 2006	Montreal, Quebec, Canada	Referee stopped the bout at 2:03 of the third round.
Loss	11-1	(Canada) David Cadieux	KO	7	12 May 2006	Shawinigan, Quebec, Canada	CQB Canada/Canada Heavyweight Title. Patrice knocked out at 0:23 of the seventh round.
Win	17-4	(United States) Josh Gutcher	KO	1	12 November 2005	Montreal, Quebec, Canada	Gutcher knocked out at 2:45 of the first round.
Win	44-19-2	(United States) Troy Weida	TKO	3	12 October 2005	Grand-Mère, Quebec, Canada	Referee stopped the bout at 2:10 of the third round.
Win	14-0-2	(Canada) Art Binkowski	UD	10	18 June 2005	Montreal, Quebec, Canada	Canada Heavyweight Title.
Win	26-17	(Brazil) Marcos Celestino	TKO	2	14 May 2005	Montreal, Quebec, Canada	Referee stopped the bout at 1:57 of the second round.
Win	10-2	(Brazil) Adenilson Rodrigues	TKO	2	9 April 2005	Montreal, Quebec, Canada	Referee stopped the bout at 2:40 of the second round.
Loss	33-8	(United States) Steve Pannell	TKO	1	26 February 2005	Hull, Quebec, Canada	Referee stopped the bout at 2:31 of the first round.
Win	5-1	(Canada) Steve MacKay	TKO	9	13 November 2004	Montreal, Quebec, Canada	Canada Heavyweight Title. Referee stopped the bout at 0:27 of the ninth round.
Win	22-37-2	(United States) Garing Lane	UD	8	11 September 2004	Montreal, Quebec, Canada	
Win	26-6	(Brazil) Jose Arimatea Da Silva	UD	8	24 April 2004	Quebec City, Canada	
Win	3-2	(United States) Marcus Harden	KO	3	20 December 2003	Montreal, Quebec, Canada	Harden knocked out at 1:15 of the third round.
Win	4-6-1	(United States) Charles Brown	UD	8	22 November 2003	Montreal, Quebec, Canada	
Win	8-4	(United States) Tali Kulihaapai	TKO	3	24 May 2003	(United States) Reno, Nevada, U.S.	Referee stopped the bout at 1:25 of the third round.
Win	7-12-1	(Canada) Ritchie Goosehead	TKO	1	28 February 2003	Granby, Quebec, Canada	Referee stopped the bout at 2:00 of the first round.
Draw	13-17-2	(United States) Willie Chapman	PTS	4	15 February 2003	(United States) Laughlin, Nevada, U.S.	
Win	9-3-1	(United States) Billy Zumbrun	TKO	4	13 October 2002	(United States) Choctaw, Mississippi, U.S.	
Win	4-1	(United States) Charles Spear	TKO	2	6 September 2002	Montreal, Quebec, Canada	Referee stopped the bout at 0:29 of the second round.
Win	25-11-1	(Canada) Shane Sutcliffe	UD	6	30 November 2001	Montreal, Quebec, Canada	
Win	4-8-1	(Canada) Dean Storey	UD	4	5 June 2001	Trois-Rivières, Quebec, Canada	
Win	3-10	(Canada) Marcelo Aravena	UD	4	2 March 2001	Montreal, Quebec, Canada	
Win	1-2	(Canada) Conrad Browne	TKO	3	8 September 2000	Montreal, Quebec, Canada	Referee stopped the bout at 2:08 of the third round.
Win	4-6	(Canada) Ritchie Goosehead	DQ	4	6 May 2000	Maniwaki, Quebec, Canada	

== Football career ==
L'Heureux is a former Canadian football player with the Diablos of Trois-Rivières in Quebec.
