= Uzbekistan national amateur boxing athletes =

Uzbekistan national amateur boxing athlete

Uzbekistan national boxing athletes represents Uzbekistan in regional, continental and world tournaments sanctioned by the Amateur International Boxing Association (AIBA).

== Olympics ==
=== 2004 Athens Olympics ===
Uzbekistan sent nine boxers to Athens. All nine made it past the round of 32, with five victories and four byes. Four of the boxers fell in the round of 16 (two of which had not had matches in the round of 32). Three more barely missed medalling by being defeated in the quarterfinals, while the two that had won their quarterfinal bouts both lost in the semifinals to earn bronze medals. These two bronze medals put the Uzbekis in a four-way tie for 12th place in the boxing medals count. The combined record of the nine boxers was 12-9.

==== Entry list ====
- Tulashboy Doniyorov (Flyweight)
- Bahodirjon Sooltonov (Bantamweight) - Bronze medalist
- Bekzod Khidirov (Featherweight)
- Dilshod Mahmudov (Light Welterweight)
- Sherzod Husanov (Welterweight)
- Sherzod Abdurahmonov (Middleweight)
- Utkirbek Haydarov (Light Heavyweight) - Bronze medalist
- Igor Alborov (Heavyweight)
- Rustam Saidov (Super Heavyweight)

== Asian Games ==
=== 2006 Doha Asian Games ===
10 amateur boxers represents Uzbekistan in this edition of the Asiad. This country brought home 5 gold medals at the last Asian Games in Busan, South Korea.

==== Entry list ====
- Utkirbek Haydarov (Light Heavyweight)
- Bekzod Khidirov (Lightweight)
- Dilshod Mahmudov (Light Welterweight)
- Jasur Matchanov (Heavyweight)
- Elshod Rasulov (Middleweight)
- Rustam Saidov (Super Heavyweight)
- Orzubek Shayimov (Bantamweight)
- Bahodirjon Sultonov (Featherweight)
- Rafikjon Sultonov (Light Flyweight)
- Behzodbek Yunusov (Welterweight)
