= Neven Pajkić =

Canadian boxer

Personal information
- Nickname: No Surrender
- Nationality: Canadian
- Born: 25 August 1977 (age 49) Sarajevo, SR Bosnia and Herzegovina, SFR Yugoslavia
- Height: 1.91 m (6 ft 3 in)
- Weight: Heavyweight

Boxing career
- Stance: Orthodox

Boxing record
- Total fights: 18
- Wins: 17
- Win by KO: 5
- Losses: 1
- Draws: 0
- No contests: 0

Neven Pajkić (Serbian Cyrillic: Невен Пајкић; born 25 August 1977) is a Bosnian-born Canadian former professional boxer. His professional debut was on 18 November 2005 against Sheldon Hinton. On 4 February 2011, he won the vacant NABA Canada heavyweight title in a match against Johnnie White. His first and only professional defeat was against Tyson Fury on 12 November 2011, after the referee stopped the fight in the third round. Prior to the stoppage, he became the first man to knock Fury down in his professional career, dropping him with an overhand right in the second round.

== Early life ==
Pajkić was born in Sarajevo to a Bosnian Serb family. When the Bosnian War started, the family moved to Belgrade, and later to Canada.

== Amateur career ==
He began amateur matches in 2003. After 17 wins in a row, he had his professional debut in 2005. Due to training for the professional debut, he was unable to compete in the 2004 Summer Olympics. His idol since he was a child is Mike Tyson.

== Personal life ==
He is married.

== Acting career ==
He has appeared in Against the Ropes, A History of Violence, Phantom Punch and ZOS: Zone of Separation. He has also appeared in season 2, episode 2 of Reacher on Amazon Prime .

== Professional boxing record ==
18 fights	17 wins	1 loss
By knockout	5	1
By decision	12	0

No.	Result	Record	Opponent	Type	Round, time	Date	Location	Notes
18	Win	17–1	Shane Andreesen	UD	10	Dec 14, 2012	Caboto Hall, Windsor, Ontario, Canada	Retained Canadian heavyweight title
17	Loss	16–1	Tyson Fury	TKO	3 (12), 2:44	Nov 12, 2011	EventCity, Manchester, England	For Commonwealth heavyweight title
16	Win	16–0	Johnnie White	UD	10	Feb 4, 2011	Molson Centre, Barrie, Ontario, Canada	Won vacant NABA Canadian heavyweight title
15	Win	15–0	Andreas Sidon	UD	8	Oct 30, 2010	Casino Rama, Rama, Ontario, Canada	
14	Win	14–0	Raphael Butler	UD	10	Sep 4, 2010	Royal York Hotel, Toronto, Ontario, Canada	
13	Win	13–0	Grzegorz Kielsa	UD	10	Jun 30, 2010	Casino Rama, Rama, Ontario, Canada	Retained Canadian heavyweight title
12	Win	12–0	Grzegorz Kielsa	UD	10	Mar 27, 2010	Casino Rama, Rama, Ontario, Canada	Won Canadian heavyweight title
11	Win	11–0	Jason Gavern	UD	6	Jan 16 2010	Hershey Centre, Mississauga, Ontario, Canada	
10	Win	10–0	Edward Dawson	TKO	2 (4), 0:42	Oct 15, 2009	The Gates on Roblin, Winnipeg, Winnipeg, Manitoba, Canada	
9	Win	9–0	Nicolai Firtha	UD	8	Apr 2, 2009	Royal York Hotel, Toronto, Ontario, Canada	
8	Win	8–0	Shane Andreesen	UD	8	Sep 27, 2008	Powerade Centre, Brampton, Ontario, Canada	
7	Win	7–0	Ryan Thompson	UD	6	May 31, 2008	Brantford Civic Centre, Brantford, Ontario, Canada	
6	Win	6–0	Sam Comming	UD	4	Nov 10, 2007	Brantford Civic Centre, Brantford, Ontario, Canada	
5	Win	5–0	Darrell Flint	TKO	1 (4), 2:22	Mar 16, 2007	Fort Garry Place, Winnipeg, Winnipeg, Manitoba, Canada	
4	Win	4–0	Jason Weiss	TKO	3 (4), 3:00	Nov 18, 2006	Powerade Centre, Brampton, Ontario, Canada	
3	Win	3–0	Stephane Tessier	MD	4	May 12, 2006	Jacques-Plante Arena, Shawinigan, Quebec, Canada	
2	Win	2–0	Walter Kienbaum	TKO	2 (4), 1:40	Mar 9, 2006	Hershey Centre, Mississauga, Ontario, Canada	
1	Win	1–0	Sheldon Hinton	KO	3 (4)	Nov 18, 2005	Shaw Conference Centre, Edmonton, Alberta, Canada	
