= Violito Payla =

Filipino boxer (born 1979)

Personal information
- Full name: Violito Payla
- Nationality: Philippines
- Born: January 8, 1979 (age 47) Cagayan de Oro, Misamis Oriental
- Height: 1.62 m (5 ft 4 in)
- Weight: 51 kg (112 lb)

Sport
- Sport: Boxing
- Weight class: Flyweight
Medal record
Asian Games
Gold medal – first place	2006 Doha	Flyweight
Asian Championships
Gold medal – first place	2004 Puerto Princesa	Flyweight
SEA Games
Bronze medal – third place	2001 Negeri Sembilan	Flyweight

Violito Payla (born January 8, 1979, in Cagayan de Oro, Misamis Oriental) is a Filipino amateur boxer, private, and coach best known for winning the Asian Games 2006 at flyweight.

At the 2002 Asian Games he beat Tulashboy Doniyorov but lost to Noman Karim. He competed at the 2004 Athens Olympics in the flyweight (– 48 kg) division but lost his bout in the round of 32 to Doniyorov of Uzbekistan, 36–26. Payla qualified for the Athens Games by winning the gold medal at the 2004 Asian Amateur Boxing Championships in Puerto Princesa, Philippines. In the final he defeated South Korea's Kim Ki-Suk.

At the 2006 Asian Games he won the gold medal in the flyweight division. He beat Yang Bo who had beaten world champ Lee in the semis and upset 2003 world champion Somjit Jongjohor of Thailand in the final, 31–15.

== Amateur career ==
Payla got his start in boxing at the Palarong Pambansa and in tournaments held by the ABAP. He was scouted by Bobby Jalnaiz, who is also from Cagayan de Oro. He first joined the Philippine national boxing team in 2001. In his first international tournament at the Balado Cup, a prestigious amateur tournament in Cuba, he won the flyweight division gold medal at 22 years old. He was recognized as the best foreign boxer in the tournament. This led to his first SEA Games stint, where he won a bronze medal, but lost to Somjit Jongjohor of Thailand 20–10 in the semis. Jongjohor went on to win the gold medal that year. Payla then capped off the year by winning the silver medal at the Feliks Stamm International Boxing Championships.

In 2002, Payla won three international tournaments and got a bronze medal at an international boxing tournament held in Pyongyang. He then competed in the 2002 Asian Games flyweight division. There, he lost to Pakistan's Nauman Karim and was not able to medal. In 2003, Payla competed at the 2003 Xinjiang International Boxing Championships where he lost to China's Guo Xianshuan despite protests from the Philippine team. He then competed at the 2003 Afro-Asian Games, where he took home a silver medal after losing to Akhil Kumar. He also competed at the 2003 SEA Games.

In 2004, Payla competed at the 2004 Asian Amateur Boxing Championships in the flyweight division. In the semifinals, he won over Tulashboy Doniyorov of Uzbekistan, which qualified him for a slot at the 2004 Athens Olympics. He then won the gold medal by defeating South Korea's Kim Ki-Suk. At the Olympics, he failed to make it out of the first round, losing to Doniyorov.

Payla once again competed at the Asian Games in 2006. He qualified for the semifinals by stopping India's Kumar Jitender. In the semifinals, he won over Yang Bo. This gave him an opportunity to face off against Jongjohor once again, who by this time had been a world champion in 2003. He had also said earlier that Payla would be "a piece of banana" if they met in the final. Payla then upset Jongjohor 31–15, and won the gold medal. This was the Philippines' first gold medal in boxing since the 1994 Asian Games. He was one of four Filipino athletes to win the gold medal at that year's Asian Games along with Antonio Gabica (billiards), Joan Tipon (boxing), and Rene Catalan (wushu). They were given ₱1,500,000 by the Philippine government as an incentive for winning.

In 2007, Payla competed at that year's AIBA World Boxing Championships, a qualifier for the 2008 Beijing Olympics. He picked up his first win of the tournament by beating Welsh boxer Andrew Selby and went on to beat England's Khalid Said. However, he failed to make the quarterfinals as he lost to American boxer Rau'shee Warren. It was also during this time that it is believed that he suffered a rotator cuff injury.

The following year, Payla continued trying to qualify for the Olympics. In one of the qualifiers, he lost to Anvar Yunusov of Tajikistan. He then tore a tendon on his left shoulder while training for the final Asian Olympic qualifying tournament. The injury made him inactive for the rest of the year. In 2009, Payla officially retired.

== Training career ==
Following retirement, Payla became one of the national boxing team's coaches. He handled the junior youth national team, and also scouted for new talent.

Around 2012, Payla was also the coach of the Leyte Sports Academy. It was there that he discovered Aira Villegas, and brought her to Manila. Villegas went on to win a bronze medal at the 2024 Olympics.

== Military service ==
While starting his boxing career, Payla served in the Philippine Army as a private. He and fellow national team boxer Harry Tañamor served as privates in the army's special service. Payla achieved the rank of private first class. After his boxing career, he continued serving in the military through his duties with the national team.

== Personal life ==
Payla is married with two children. His father was a mango plantation caretaker in Cagayan de Oro.
