= Zhang Xiaoping =

Chinese boxer

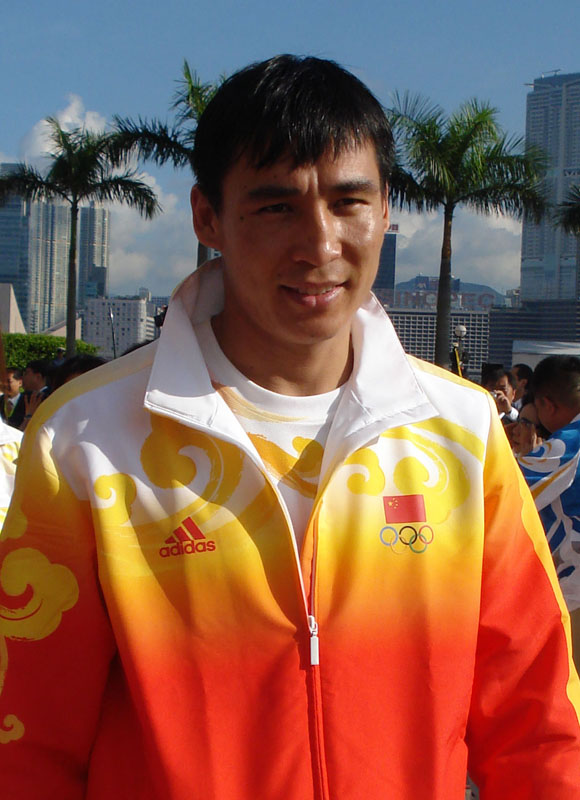
- Zhang Xiaoping during the Olympic Games 2008

Medal record

Men's Boxing

Representing China

Olympic Games
Gold medal – first place	2008 Beijing	Light Heavyweight

Asian Championships
Silver medal – second place	2007 Ulan Bator	Light Heavyweight

Zhang Xiaoping (simplified Chinese: 张小平; traditional Chinese: 張小平; pinyin: Zhāng Xiǎopíng; born April 1, 1982, in Xilinhot, Inner Mongolia) is a Chinese amateur boxer of Mongol ethnicity who won a gold medal as a light heavyweight in the 2008 Beijing Olympics.

== Career ==
He won two matches at the world championships 2007 including an upset over Germany's world military champion Gottlieb Weiss but lost to veteran Yerkabulan Shinaliev and fell one win short of direct qualification.

At the qualifier he beat Mehdi Ghorbani and Dinesh Kumar, a loss to Jahon Qurbonov was meaningless.

In the final of the 2008 Beijing Olympics he beat Kenneth Egan of Ireland to win the gold medal. The final match was controversial in that the judges failed to record multiple points for Egan, the NBC announcers concurred on this point.

=== Beijing Olympic games results ===
2008 (as a Light heavyweight)

- Defeated Mourad Sahraoui (Tunisia) 3–1
- Defeated Artur Beterbiyev (Russia) 8–2
- Defeated Abdelhafid Benchabla (Algeria) 12–7
- Defeated Yerkebulan Shynaliyev (Kazakhstan) 4–4
- Defeated Kenneth Egan (Ireland) 11–7

=== World amateur championships results ===
2007 (as a Light heavyweight)

- Defeated Jasveer Singh (India) 17–3
- Defeated Gottlieb Weiss (Germany) 17–13
- Lost to Yerkebulan Shynaliyev (Kazakhstan) 5–14
