= Zhang Junlong =

Chinese boxer (born 1981)

Zhang Junlong 張君龍
Personal information
- Nickname: Dragon King
- Born: Junlong Zhang; 12 November 1981 (age 44) Qingdao, China
- Height: 6 ft 4 in (193 cm)
- Weight: Heavyweight

Boxing career
- Reach: 76 in (193 cm)
- Stance: Orthodox

Boxing record
- Total fights: 20
- Wins: 19
- Win by KO: 18
- Losses: 1
- Draws: 0
Medal record
Men's boxing
Representing China
Asian Games
Bronze medal – third place	2002 Busan	Super heavyweight
Asian Championships
Bronze medal – third place	2002 Seremban	Super heavyweight

Zhang Junlong (Chinese: 张君龙) (born 12 November 1981) is a Chinese professional boxer who held the WBA Oceania heavyweight title between 2016 and 2017.

== Professional career ==
Zhang made his professional debut in 2012 at the age of 31, winning all of his 20 fights by knockout.

On January 23, 2014, he faced David Koswara to win his first professional titles, the inaugural WBA Asian and CPBF Asian heavyweight titles. One month later he defeated unknown fighter Timor Benz to win the vacant WBF Asia Pacific heavyweight title. During May of the same year he won via a fifth-round knockout against former cruiserweight Nico Toriri for the vacant IBO Asia Pacific heavyweight title.

On November 30, 2014, Zhang faced veteran journeyman Jason Gavern, stopping him in the third round to win the vacant WBF Intercontinental and WBU heavyweight interim (German version) titles, making him one of the few Chinese fighters to win a minor world title.

On 11 April 2016, Zhang extended his perfect record and took out Brazilian George Arias (56-16, 42) in 2 rounds in Jinghong to claim the WBA Oceania Heavyweight title.

In 2017, Zhang refused to pay the WBA's sanctioning fees, thus he was removed from their rankings.

It was reported on January 26, 2022, that Zhang's wife, Nana, died.

== Professional boxing record ==
21 fights	21 wins	0 losses
By knockout	20	0
By decision	1	0
Draws	0	

No.	Result	Record	Opponent	Type	Round, time	Date	Location	Notes
21	Win	21-0	(Argentina) Guillermo Casas	UD	10	14 May 2022	China Show, Beijing, China	
20	Win	20-0	Osborne Machimana	KO		12 Nov 2018		
19	Win	19-0	(Argentina) Victor Emilio Ramirez	KO	1 (12), 1:36	18 Dec 2017	China Show, Beijing, China	Retained WBA Oceania heavyweight title
18	Win	18-0	(South Africa) Osborne Machimana	KO	1 (12), 2:10	30 Jul 2017	Grand Regency Hotel, Qingdao, China	Retained WBA Oceania heavyweight title
17	Win	17-0	(Brazil) Pedro Otas	KO	2 (12)	9 May 2017	Beijing, China	Retained WBA Oceania heavyweight title
16	Win	16-0	(Bolivia) Saul Farah	KO	1 (12), 1:28	29 Mar 2017	Grand Regency Hotel, Qingdao, China	Retained WBA Oceania heavyweight title
15	Win	15-0	(Argentina) Rogelio Omar Rossi	KO	1 (12)	23 Jan 2017	China Show, Beijing, China	Retained WBA Oceania heavyweight title
14	Win	14-0	(Brazil) Julio Cesar Dos Santos	TKO	2 (12)	7 Aug 2016	The Oulebao Dream World, Penglai, China	Retained WBA Oceania heavyweight title
13	Win	13-0	(Brazil) George Arias	TKO	2 (12), 0:47	11 Apr 2016	Sport Hall, Jinghong, China	Won vacant WBA Oceania heavyweight title
12	Win	12-0	(Argentina) Juan Pedro Guglielmetti	KO	3 (12), 2:15	30 Jan 2016	The Oulebao Dream World, Penglai, China	
11	Win	11-0	(Barbados) Shawn Cox	KO	2 (12)	29 May 2015	Sport Hall, Beijing, China	
10	Win	10-0	(United States) Jason Gavern	TKO	3 (12)	30 Nov 2014	Sport Hall, Wuhan, China	Won vacant WBF Intercontinental and WBU (German) heavyweight titles
9	Win	9-0	(Indonesia) Nico Toriri	KO	5 (12), 2:28	31 May 2014	Tian He Stadium, Guangzhou, China	Won vacant IBO Asia Pacific heavyweight title
8	Win	8-0	(Thailand) Atthapong Sangthep	KO	2 (12), 0:35	28 Feb 2014	Guoxin Gym, Qingdao, China	Won vacant WBF heavyweight title
7	Win	7-0	(Indonesia) David Koswara	KO	1 (12), 1:16	23 Jan 2014	Guoxin Gym, Qingdao, China	Won vacant WBA Asia-CPBF heavyweight titles
6	Win	6-0	(Kenya) Peter Omondi Okello	KO	2 (10), 2:10	30 Nov 2013	Guoxin Gym, Qingdao, China	
5	Win	5-0	(Thailand) Sura Isaak	KO	2 (10), 1:28	28 Sep 2013	Sport Hall, Penglai, China	
4	Win	4-0	(United States) Cullen Rogers	TKO	3 (6), 2:46	27 Jul 2013	Sport Hall, Penglai, China	
3	Win	3-0	(China) Liu Min Feng	KO	1 (6), 0:42	26 Jan 2013	Sport Hall, Beijing, China	
2	Win	2-0	(China) Chang Yu	KO	1 (4)	21 Dec 2012	Sport Hall, Haikou, China	
1	Win	1-0	(China) Chang Xin	KO	2 (4), 1:37	27 Oct 2012	Beijing Senki Boxing Club, Beijing, China	

Achievements
Vacant Title last held by Mark de Mori	WBU Heavyweight Champion; Interim Title; November 30, 2014 – September 19, 2015	Vacant Title next held by Werner Kreiskott
Vacant Title last held by Joseph Parker	WBA Oceania Heavyweight Champion; April 11, 2016 – present	Incumbent
