= Yerkebulan Shynaliyev =

Kazakhstani boxer (born 1987)

Personal information
- Full name: Еркебулан Шыналиев
- Nationality: Kazakh
- Born: October 7, 1987 (age 38) Karabastau near Shymkent, Kazakh SSR, Soviet Union
- Height: 1.78 m (5 ft 10 in)
- Weight: 81 kg (179 lb)

Sport
- Sport: Boxing
- Weight class: Light Heavyweight
Medal record
Olympic Games
| Bronze medal – third place | 2008 Beijing | Light Heavyweight |
World Amateur Championships
| Bronze medal – third place | 2007 Chicago | Light Heavyweight |

Yerkebulan Shynaliyev (born October 7, 1987) is an amateur boxer from Kazakhstan best known for winning bronze medals at light heavyweight at the 2007 World Amateur Boxing Championships and at the 2008 Summer Olympics.

== Career ==
Shynaliyev won silver at the World Junior Championships in 2006.

At the seniors 2007, the short southpaw beat Asian Champ Jahon Qurbonov and Tony Jeffries 20:9 but lost to eventual winner Abbos Atoev 8:17 in the semifinal.

=== Olympic games results ===
2008 (as a Light heavyweight)

- Defeated Daugirdas Semiotas (Lithuania) 11–3
- Defeated Carlos Negrón (Puerto Rico) 9–3
- Defeated Djakhon Kurbanov (Tajikistan) WDQ 3 (2:43)
- Lost to Zhang Xiaoping (China) 4–4

Note: Shynaliyev was leading 12-6 when Kurbanov was disqualified for biting Shynaliyev on the shoulder.

=== World amateur championship results ===
2007 (as a Light heavyweight)

- Defeated Evgeni Chernovol (Moldava) 28–10
- Defeated Djakhon Kurbanov (Tajikistan) DQ 4
- Defeated Zhang Xiaoping (China) 14–5
- Defeated Tony Jeffries (England) 20–9
- Lost to Abbos Atoev (Uzbekistan) 8-17
