= Kurban Günebakan =

Turkish boxer (born 1978)

Personal information
- Nickname: Kaplan (English: Tiger)
- Nationality: Turkish
- Born: September 13, 1978 (age 47) Kars, Turkey
- Weight: Super heavyweight

Boxing career
Medal record
Representing Turkey
Men's Boxing
European Amateur Championships
Bronze medal – third place	2006 Plovdiv	Super Heavyweight
EU Amateur Championships
Bronze medal – third place	2005 Cagliari	Super Heavyweight

Kurban Günebakan (born September 13, 1978 in Kars), nicknamed Kaplan (English: Tiger), is a Turkish amateur boxer best known to win the bronze medal in the super heavyweight division at the 2006 European Amateur Boxing Championships held in Plovdiv, Bulgaria. He competes for Bursa Emniyet, the sports club of the Police Department in Bursa.

He was the bronze medal winner at the 2005 European Union Amateur Boxing Championships held in Cagliari, Sardinia, Italy. At the 2007 World Amateur Boxing Championships in Chicago, USA, he defeated Juan Oliva Aleman from Spain by 22:11, lost then to American champion Michael Hunter Jr. by 7:30 in the round of 16.
