= Daugirdas Šemiotas =

Lithuanian boxer (born 1983)

Medal record

Men's Boxing

Representing Lithuania

World Amateur Championships
Bronze medal – third place	2007 Chicago	Light Heavyweight

Daugirdas Šemiotas (born May 20, 1983) is an amateur boxer from Lithuania who is best known for winning the bronze medal in the light heavyweight division at the 2007 World Amateur Boxing Championships.

He defeated Egypt's Ramadan Yasser 18:9 but was injured and did not fight in the semi-final against Russia's Artur Beterbiyev. At the 2008 Summer Olympics he lost his first bout 3:11 to Yerkebuian Shynaliyev from Kazakhstan. He failed to qualify for the 2004 Summer Olympics after ending up in third place at the 1st AIBA European 2004 Olympic Qualifying Tournament in Plovdiv, Bulgaria.
