= Ramadan Yasser =

Egyptian boxer (born 1980)

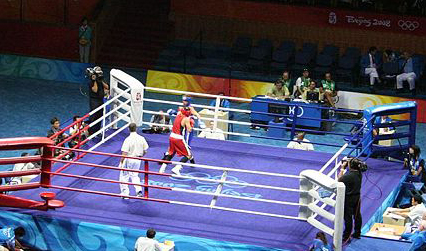
- Ramadan Yasser (in red) v. Ramazan Magomedov (BLR)

Personal information
- Full name: Ramadan Yasser Abdel Ghaffar
- Nationality: Egypt
- Born: 19 July 1980 (age 45) Gharbîya el-Saqriya, Al-Wadi Al-Jadid
- Height: 1.85 m (6 ft 1 in)
- Weight: 75 kg (165 lb)

Sport
- Sport: Boxing
- Weight class: Light Heavyweight
Medal record
All-Africa Games
Gold medal – first place	1999 Johannesburg	Middleweight
Gold medal – first place	2003 Abuja	Middleweight
Gold medal – first place	2007 Algiers	Light Heavyweight
Mediterranean Games
Gold medal – first place	2001 Tunis	Middleweight

Ramadan Yasser Abdel Ghaffar (Arabic: ياسر رمضان عبد الغفار; born July 19, 1980, in Gharbîya el-Saqriya, Al-Wadi Al-Jadid) is a boxer from Egypt.

== Career ==
Yasser won the gold medal in the men's middleweight division at the 1999 All-Africa Games and went to the Olympics 2000 where he lost his first match 7:8 to Korea's Im Jung-Bin. In 2003, he repeated his win at the All-Africa Games in Abuja, Nigeria.

Yasser also participated at the 2004 Summer Olympics for his native North African country. He was beaten in the quarterfinals of the middleweight (– 75 kg) division by Kazakhstan's world champion and eventual runner-up Gennady Golovkin.

In 2007, he won the All-Africa Games as a light heavyweight. Yasser reached the quarterfinals of the 2007 AIBA World Boxing Championships in Chicago, fighting in the Light Heavyweight (81 kg) division. After having a bye in the first round, Yasser defeated Jack Badou of Sweden (PTS 18:9) in the Preliminaries, and PanAm champion Eleider Alvarez of Colombia (KO R4 1:10) in the Round of 16, both of whom also had a bye in the first round. He then lost 9:18 to Lithuania's Daugirdas Semiotas.

At the 2008 Summer Olympics he was upset by Algeria's Abdelhafid Benchabla 6:13.
