= Satupaitea Farani Tavui =

Samoan boxer

Personal information
- Born: November 6, 1985 (age 39)
- Height: 1.67 m (5 ft 5 1/2 in)
- Weight: 81 kg (179 lb)

Sport
- Country: Samoa
- Sport: Boxing

Satupaitea Farani Tavui (born November 6, 1985) is an amateur boxer from Samoa who won the Oceania title in the light-heavyweight division in 2007 and 2008, thereby qualifying for the 2008 Olympics.

He lost his only Olympic bout against veteran Marijo Šivolija, suffering a severe knockout and being taken to Beijing's Chaoyang Hospital. He was later reported as recovering well.
