= Grzegorz Kielsa =

Polish boxer

Personal information
- Nickname: The Steel Pole
- Nationality: Polish
- Born: 26 May 1979 (age 47) Białystok, Poland
- Weight: heavyweight

Boxing career
- Stance: southpaw

Boxing record
- Total fights: 14
- Wins: 11
- Win by KO: 3
- Losses: 2
- Draws: 0
- No contests: 1

Grzegorz Kielsa (born 26 May 1979) is a Canada-based Polish professional boxer.

== Amateur career ==
He fought at both the 2000 and 2002 European Boxing Championships but did not gain a medal at either.

Kielsa represented Poland at the 2000 Olympics in Sydney, Australia. He lost to the Kazakhstan's Mukhtarkhan Dildabekov in his first fight, Dildabekov went on to win the silver medal.

At the 2003 World championships in Bangkok he beat China's Zhang Zhilei in the first round but lost to eventual winner Alexander Povetkin in the next round.

=== Amateur Boxing Highlights ===
- 2000 at the Olympic Games in Sydney, Australia at Superheavyweight. Results were:
  - Lost to Mukhtarkhan Dildabekov (KAZ) PTS (16-5)
- 2003 at the World Championships in Bangkok at Superheavyweight. Results were:
  - Defeated Zhang Zhilei (China) PTS (22-8)
  - Lost to Alexander Povetkin (Russia) PTS (20-9)

== Professional career ==
=== Debut fight ===
Kielsa has fought all of his professional bouts in Canada. His first fight as a professional boxer was in March 2006, in Montreal, Quebec, Canada, when he beat American fighter Mike Jones with a first round knockout.

=== First title fight ===
Kielsa won his first 6 fights, 3 wins by KO, and in November 2008, he fought for his first title belt against Toronto based Raymond Olubowale at the Casino Rama, Ontario, for the Canadian heavyweight title. Kielsa, won the title on points being clearly ahead on points all scorecards after ten rounds.

== Professional boxing record ==
11 Wins (5 knockouts, 6 decisions), 2 Losses (0 knockouts, 2 decisions), 1 No Contest
Result	Record	Opponent	Type	Round	Date	Location	Notes
Loss	12-0	(Canada) Neven Pajkic	UD	10	30/06/2010	Rama, Ontario, Canada	Canada Heavyweight Title.
Loss	11-0	(Canada) Neven Pajkic	UD	10	27/03/2010	Rama, Ontario, Canada	Canada Heavyweight Title.
Win	9-8-2	(United States) Jason Bergman	UD	6	21/11/2009	Rama, Ontario, Canada	
Win	17-6-1	(United States) Kevin Montiy	NC	2	04/09/2009	Rama, Ontario, Canada	Fight stopped due to Montiy's inability to see out of his left eye.
Win	23-9-1	(United States) Byron Polley	TKO	4	26/06/2009	Rama, Ontario, Canada	Referee stopped the bout at 2:12 of the fourth round.
Win	14-4-2	(Canada) Arthur Cook	TKO	8	20/03/2009	Rama, Ontario, Canada	Canada Heavyweight Title. Referee stopped the bout at 1:16 of the eighth round.
Win	7-2-1	(Canada) Raymond Olubowale	UD	10	21/11/2008	Rama, Ontario, Canada	Canada Heavyweight Title.
Win	7-4	(The Bahamas) Jerry Butler	UD	8	29/08/2008	Rama, Ontario, Canada	
Win	3-1-4	(Mexico) Alvaro Morales	UD	4	20/06/2008	(United States) Las Vegas, Nevada, U.S.	
Win	9-5-1	(United States) Kenny Lemos	TKO	3	05/04/2008	Rama, Ontario, Canada	
Win	3-9	(Canada) Stephane Tessier	UD	6	28/10/2006	Gatineau, Quebec, Canada	
Win	0-1	(Trinidad and Tobago) Mickey Richards	TKO	2	23/06/2006	Toronto, Ontario, Canada	Referee stopped the bout at 3:00 of the second round.
Win	3-5	(Canada) Stephane Tessier	UD	4	08/04/2006	Montreal, Quebec, Canada	
Win	2-3	(United States) Mike Jones	KO	2	11/03/2006	Montreal, Quebec, Canada	Jones knocked out at 2:10 of the second round.
