= Ramazan Magomedov =

Belarusian boxer

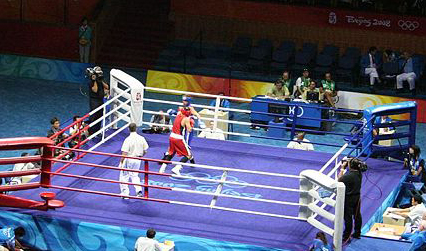
Ramadan Yasser (Egypt) v. Ramazan Magomedov

Ramazan Magomedov (born in Dagestan) whose second name is also sometimes spelt Magamedau is a Belarusian amateur boxer who qualified for the 2008 Olympics at light-heavyweight.

The elusive Magomedov lost to Tony Jeffries at the 2007 World Championships.

He beat Kenneth Egan at the first qualifier, though, and punched his ticket to Beijing where he was edged out in his first bout by Ramadan Yasser.

He currently boxes for the World Series Boxing team Azerbaijan Baku Fires, with a record of 12 wins and 0 losses .
