= Alexis Rubalcaba =

Cuban boxer (born 1972)

Personal information
- Full name: Alexis Rubalcaba Polledo
- Nationality: Cuba
- Born: September 9, 1972 (age 54) Pedro Betancourt, Matanzas
- Height: 2.04 m (6 ft 8 in)
- Weight: 95 kg (209 lb)

Sport
- Sport: Boxing
- Weight class: Super Heavyweight
Medal record
World Amateur Championships
Silver medal – second place	1997 Budapest	Super Heavyweight
Pan American Games
Gold medal – first place	1999 Winnipeg	Super Heavyweight
Goodwill Games
Silver medal – second place	1998 New York	Super Heavyweight

Alexis Rubalcaba (born September 9, 1972) is a retired boxer from Cuba, who competed in the Super Heavyweight division. He twice represented his native country at the Summer Olympics: in 1996 (where he suffered a shocking loss to Paea Wolfgramm of Tonga in the quarter-finals) and in 2000. One of his biggest achievements in amateur boxing was winning the gold medal at the 1999 Pan American Games in Winnipeg, Manitoba, Canada. Two years earlier, at the 1997 World Amateur Boxing Championships in Budapest, Hungary, he won a silver medal.

== Results ==
1996 Summer Olympics

- 1st round bye
- Defeated Paolo Vidoz (Italy) RSC 1 (2:39)
- Lost to Paea Wolfgramm (Tonga) 12–17

1999 Pan American Games

- Defeated Ruben Pallardel (Peru) KO 1
- Defeated Patrice L'Heureux (Canada) RSC 2
- Defeated Claudio Silva (Brazil) RSCH 1
- Defeated Davin King (United States) WO.

2000 Summer Olympics

- Defeated Cengiz Koc (Germany) KO 1
- Lost to Mukhtarkhan Dildabekov (Kazakhstan) 12–25
