= Ahmed Abdel Samad =

Egyptian boxer (born 1972)

Personal information
- Born: 15 September 1972 (age 53)
Medal record
Men's Boxing
Representing Egypt
All-Africa Games
Gold medal – first place	1999 Johannesburg	Super Heavyweight

Ahmed Ali Ibrahim Abdel Samad (born 15 September 1972) is a retired amateur boxer from Egypt, who is best known for winning the gold medal in the men's super heavyweight division (+ 91 kg) at the 1999 All-Africa Games in Johannesburg, South Africa. He represented his native country at the 2000 Summer Olympics in Sydney, Australia, where he was defeated in the first round by eventual bronze medal winner Rustam Saidov from Uzbekistan.
