= Angus Shelford =

New Zealand professional boxer

Personal information
- Full name: Angus Whare Shelford
- Nationality: New Zealand
- Born: 2 October 1976 (age 49) Ōtāhuhu, Auckland
- Height: 1.80 m (5 ft 11 in)
- Weight: 100 kg (220 lb)

Sport
- Sport: Boxing
- Weight class: Super Heavyweight

Angus Whare Shelford (born 2 October 1976 in Otahuhu, New Zealand) is a boxer from New Zealand, who competed at the 2000 Summer Olympics in Sydney. There he was defeated in the first round of the Super Heavyweight (+ 91 kg) division by Oleksil Mazikin of Ukraine.

Attempting to qualify for the 2004 Summer Olympics in the super heavyweight division, Shelford was disqualified by a medical panel from the Oceania Boxing Championships due to an ear infection.
