= Yang Bo (boxer) =

Chinese boxer

Personal information
- Nationality: Chinese
- Born: October 11, 1983 (age 42) Inner Mongolia, China
- Height: 169 cm (5 ft 7 in)
- Weight: 51 kg (112 lb)

Boxing career

Yang Bo
Medal record

Men's Boxing

Representing China

Asian Games
Bronze medal – third place	2006 Doha	Flyweight

Asian Championships
Silver medal – second place	2007 Ulan Bator	Flyweight

Yang Bo (simplified Chinese: 杨波; traditional Chinese: 楊波; pinyin: Yáng Bō; born October 11, 1983) is a Chinese boxer who won bronze at the Asian Championships 2006 at flyweight.

He upset world champion Lee Ok-Sung but lost in the semifinal to Violito Payla by RSCO.

2005 at the World Championships in his home country he lost in the first round to Juan Carlos Payano 22:36.

== Life experience ==
Yang Bo received boxing training at Baotou Sports School in Inner Mongolia in 1995. The coach is Dan Yongqiang. Three years later, he went to Guangdong to continue to participate in training, with Dong Tingjiang as his coach. In 2005, he got a chance to be promoted to the national team, with Zhang Chuanliang as his coach.

In the same year, Yang Bo defeated his Shanghai opponent with a 39:24 result in the 51 kg sub-item final of the Boxing Event of the Tenth National Games and won one of the three gold medals in the boxing competition for the People's Liberation Army. In December of the same year, he eliminated the 2005 World Championship winner with 41:21 points in the quarter-finals of the 51 kg sub-item of the Doha Asian Games. South Korea's Lee Ok Sung advanced to the semi-finals and eventually won a bronze medal after losing to his opponent in the Philippines.

In March 2007, Yang Bo won the national championship. He was eliminated in the last eight of the world championships. In June, he finished third at the Asian Championships in Mongolia. At the 11th National Games two years later, Yang took part in the same event, but he was eliminated in the last eight and was unable to defend his gold medal.
