= Art Binkowski =

Canadian boxer

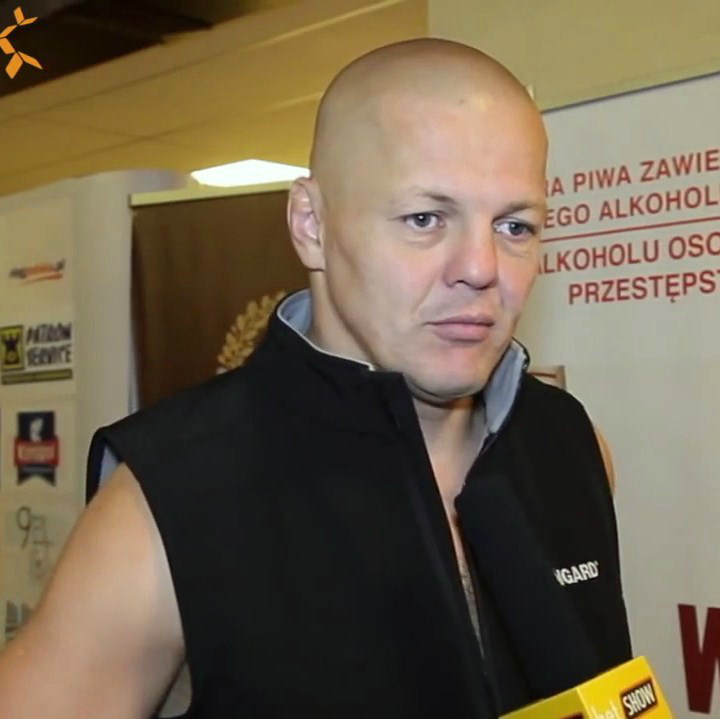
- Art Binkowski (2013)

Personal information
- Full name: Artur Binkowski
- Nickname: "Polish Warrior"
- Nationality: Poland
- Born: February 19, 1975 (age 51) Bielawa, Dolnośląskie
- Height: 1.85 m (6 ft 1 in)
- Weight: 91 kg (201 lb)

Sport
- Sport: Boxing
- Weight class: Super Heavyweight
- Club: Aviva Jerusalem

Artur "Art" Binkowski (Polish pronunciation: [ˈartur biŋˈkɔfskʲi]; born February 19, 1975) is a Polish-born Canadian heavyweight boxer who competed for his adoptive country Canada at the 2000 Summer Olympics in Sydney, Australia.

== Background ==
Binkowski came to Canada from Poland at the age of 13. He studied psychology at the University of Waterloo.

== Amateur career ==
Binkowski was Ontario amateur heavyweight champion for 6 years. He took part in the Olympics 2000 at superheavyweight. There he was defeated in the quarterfinals by Uzbekistan's Rustam Saidov.

== Professional career ==
Nicknamed "The Polish Warrior", the resident of Mississauga, Ontario, made his debut as a professional on November 23, 2001, in Southfield, Michigan, against Michael Moncrief of the United States.

In 2005, Binkowski lost to a lightly regarded countryman Patrice L'Heureux. Although Binkowski sported the better record, he came in as an underdog against hard-hitting American amateur star Rafael Butler on ShoBox in April 2007. He hit the deck three times in the first round but scored a stunning come-from-behind TKO in the final round of their bout.

Binkowski was crushed in a 2nd-round TKO loss to Mike Mollo in October 2007.

On 19 October 2013, Binkowski was defeated by Krzysztof Zimnoch in Poland, Wieliczka.

== Outside the ring ==
He also played the boxer John 'Corn' Griffin in the movie "Cinderella Man", starring Russell Crowe.

In his social media posts Binkowski frequently promotes songs from the repertoire of the neo-Nazi bands, he also posts his own comments with racist and antisemitic contents. In 2018 following the action taken by the "Never Again" Association, exposing racist statements made in public by Binkowski, his participation in the National Boxing Gala, announced as the biggest boxing event in Polish history, has been cancelled.

== See also ==
- List of University of Waterloo people
