= Rustam Saidov =

Uzbekistani boxer (born 1978)

Personal information
- Full name: Рустам Саидов
- Nationality: Uzbekistan
- Born: 6 February 1978 (age 48) Tashkent, Uzbek SSR, Soviet Union
- Height: 1.88 m (6 ft 2 in)
- Weight: 96 kg (212 lb)

Sport
- Sport: Boxing
- Weight class: Super heavyweight
Medal record
Olympic Games
Bronze medal – third place	2000 Sydney	Super heavyweight
World Amateur Championships
Bronze medal – third place	2003 Bangkok	Super heavyweight
Asian Games
Gold medal – first place	2002 Busan	Super heavyweight
Gold medal – first place	2006 Doha	Super heavyweight
Asian Championships
Gold medal – first place	1999 Tashkent	Super heavyweight
Gold medal – first place	2002 Seremban	Super heavyweight
Gold medal – first place	2007 Ulan Bator	Super heavyweight
Silver medal – second place	2005 Ho Chi Minh City	Super heavyweight

Rustam Saidov (Рустам Саидов; born 6 February 1978) is a boxer from Uzbekistan, who competed in the Super Heavyweight (+91 kg) at the 2000 Summer Olympics and won the bronze medal.

== Career ==
In Athens at the 2004 Summer Olympics, he was eliminated in the first round of the Super Heavyweight (over 91 kg) division by Cuba's southpaw Michel Lopez Nuñez (13–18). He qualified for the Athens Games by winning the gold medal at the 2004 Asian Amateur Boxing Championships in Puerto Princesa, Philippines. In the final, he defeated Tajikistan's Sergei Kharitonov.

In 2002 and 2006, he became Asian champ beating Olympic silver medallist Mukhtarkhan Dildabekov in the final both times.

2005 he lost to Russian southpaw Roman Romanchuk at the World Championships.

2007 he again made an early exit from the World Championships.

=== Olympic results ===
2000

- Defeated Ahmed Abdel Samad (Egypt) 21–8
- Defeated Art Binkowski (Canada) RSC 2
- Lost to Mukhtarkhan Dildabekov (Kazakhstan) 22–28

2004

- Lost to Michel López Núñez (Cuba) 13-18
