= Julius Jackson =

Virgin Islands boxer (born 1987)

Personal information
- Nickname: The Chef
- Born: Julius Jackson; August 1, 1987 (age 39) Saint Thomas, U.S. Virgin Island
- Height: 6 ft 2 in (188 cm)
- Weight: Middleweight; Super middleweight; Light heavyweight

Boxing career
- Reach: 78 in (198 cm)

Boxing record
- Total fights: 22
- Wins: 20
- Win by KO: 16
- Losses: 2

Julius Jackson (born August 1, 1987) is a professional boxer from the Virgin Islands who qualified for the 2008 Olympics at light-heavyweight, as did his brother John Jackson. Their father is boxer Julian Jackson.

== Amateur career ==
At the 2007 World Championships he lost to Ireland's Kenneth Egan by RSCO. At the first Olympic qualifier he lost 3:10 to Julio Castillo.

At the second qualifier he benefited from a bye and defeated boxers from Nicaragua and Mexico to qualify. His loss to Eleider Alvarez did not have an effect on his qualification. At the Olympics he lost in the round of 32 to Kenneth Egan again, by 22–2.

== Professional career ==
Julius Jackson is currently professionally fighting with a record of 20–2 (16 KOs). He previously held the WBC USNBC Title and the WBA Fedebol Title.

== Acting ==
Julius Jackson has acted in the role of a boxer in the Telemundo series El César on the life of Julio César Chávez.
