= Huzam Nabaah =

Qatari boxer

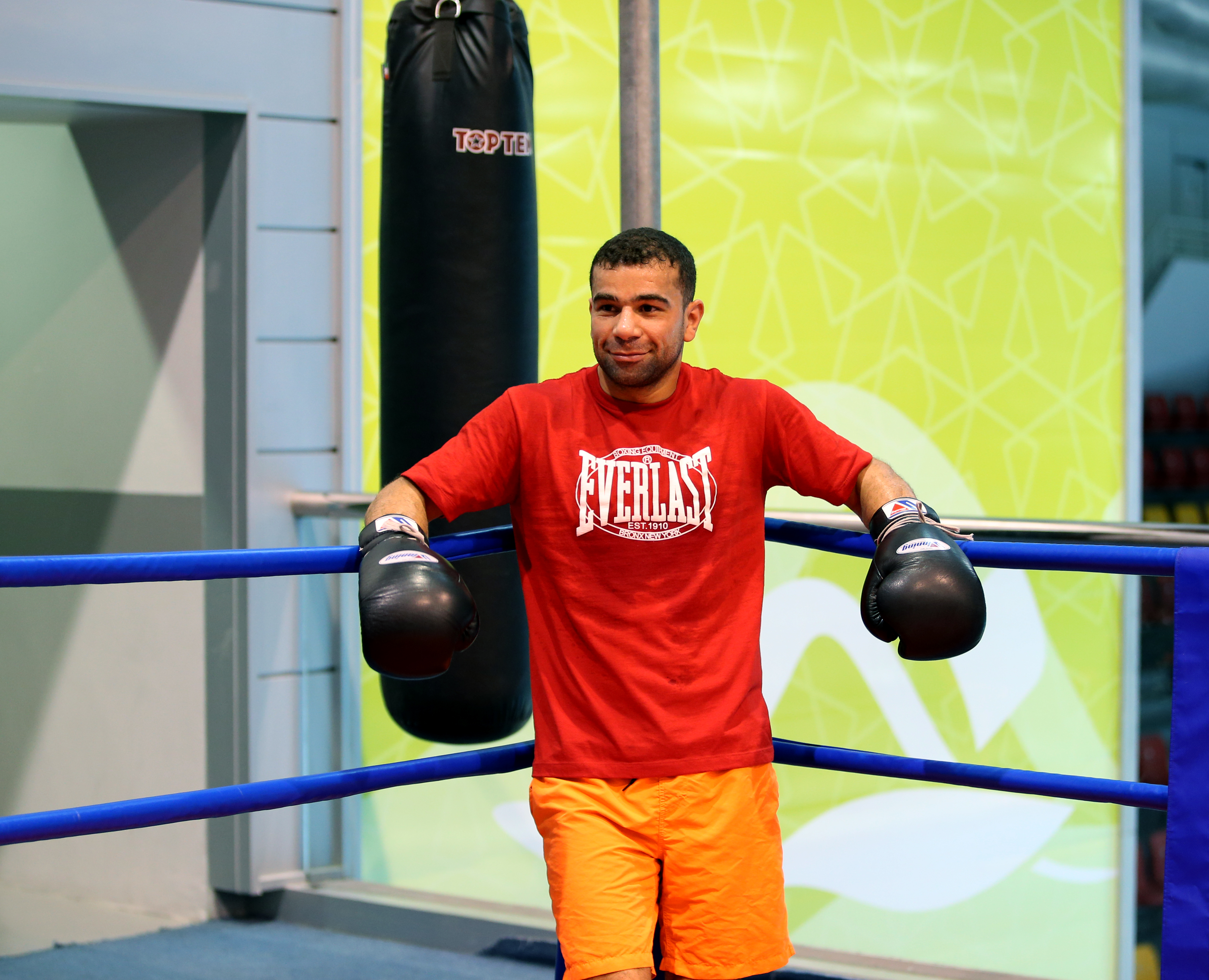

Medal record

Representing Qatar

Men's Boxing

Asian Games
Bronze medal – third place	Doha 2006	Light Heavyweight

Huzam Nabaah (Arabic: حزام نبعة, born January 2, 1981) is an amateur boxer from Qatar who competed in the Light Heavyweight (-81 kg) division at the 2006 Asian Games winning the bronze medal in a lost bout against Korea's Sung Song Hak 15-29.
