= Lee Ok-sung =

South Korean boxer (born 1981)

Lee Ok-Sung
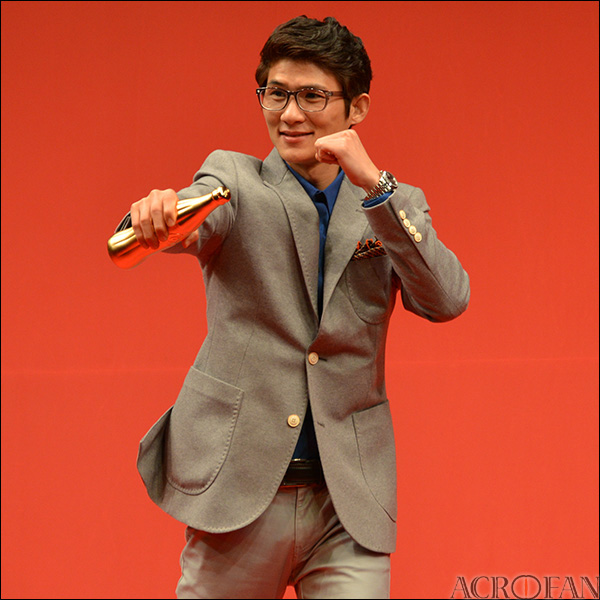

Personal information
- Full name: 이옥성
- Nationality: South Korea
- Born: February 7, 1981 (age 45) Jinju, Gyeongsangnam-do
- Height: 1.72 m (5 ft 8 in)
- Weight: 51 kg (112 lb)

Sport
- Sport: Boxing
- Weight class: Flyweight
Medal record
World Amateur Championships
Gold medal – first place	2005 Mianyang	Flyweight
Asian Championships
Gold medal – first place	2005 Ho Chi Minh City	Flyweight

Lee Ok-Sung (born February 7, 1981, in Jinju, Gyeongsangnam-do, South Korea) is a South Korean amateur boxer best known for winning the 2005 World Amateur Boxing Championships in the men's flyweight division.

== Career ==
Lee is relatively tall for a flyweight (170 cm). At the 2005 World Championships In Mianyang, China, he beat young southpaw Rau'shee Warren to set up his championship final. In the finals he defeated Cuban Andry Laffita who had beaten Somjit Jongjohor (THA) and Jérôme Thomas (FRA). He became the first South Korean amateur boxer to win a gold medal at the World Amateur Boxing Championships since 1986 when Moon Sung-Kil won the gold in Reno, United States.

At the 2006 Asian Games Lee just as surprisingly lost to Yang Bo of China in the quarterfinals, and his winning streak in international competition ended at 28 games.

He did not participated in the national trials for the 2007 World Championships in order to complete his master's degree.

In the first round of the 2008 Olympic Games Lee reached the second round.

== Results ==
2005 World Championships

Event	Round	Result	Opponent	Score
Flyweight	First	bye		
Flyweight	Second	Win	(Moldova) Igor Samoilenco	30-20
Flyweight	Third	Win	(Georgia (country)) Nikoloz Izoria	26-17
Flyweight	Quarterfinal	Win	(Tajikistan) Anvar Yunusov	15-9
Flyweight	Semifinal	Win	(United States) Rau'shee Warren	16-15
Flyweight	Final	Win	(Cuba) Andry Laffita	33-22

2008 Summer Olympics

Event	Round	Result	Opponent	Score
Flyweight	First	Win	(United States) Rau'shee Warren	9-8
Flyweight	Second	Loss	(Tunisia) Walid Cherif	5-11
