= Tony Jeffries =

British boxer (born 1985)

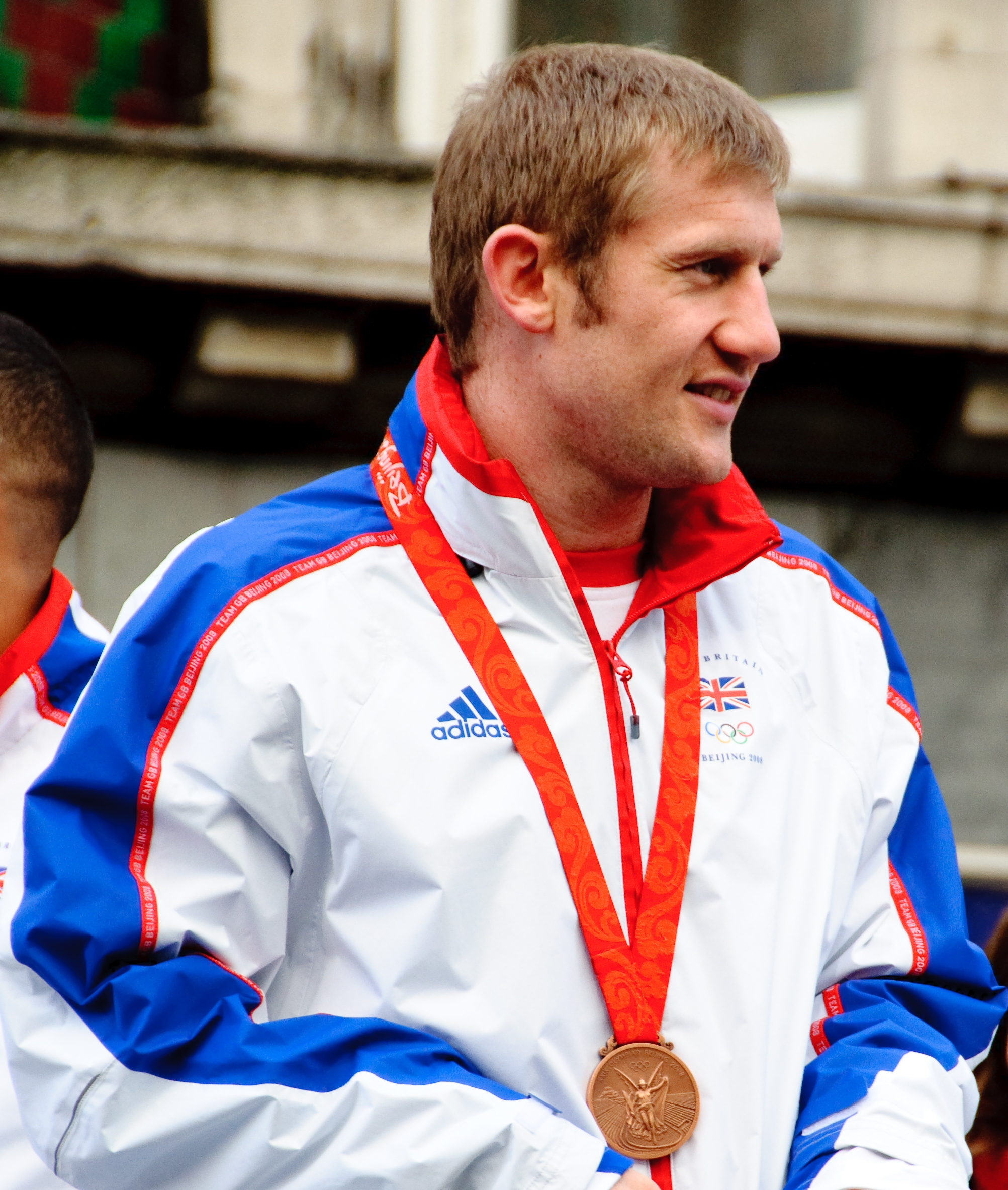
- Jeffries in 2008

Personal information
- Nicknames: Jaffa; The Mighty Mackem
- Born: 2 March 1985 (age 41) Sunderland, England
- Height: 6 ft 2 in (188 cm)
- Weight: Light-heavyweight

Boxing career
- Stance: Orthodox

Boxing record
- Total fights: 10
- Wins: 9
- Win by KO: 6
- Draws: 1
Medal record
Men's amateur boxing
Representing Great Britain
Olympic Games
Bronze medal – third place	Beijing 2008	Light-heavyweight
European Union Championships
Representing England
Silver medal – second place	2008 Cetniewo	Light-heavyweight
Bronze medal – third place	2004 Madrid	Light-heavyweight
Bronze medal – third place	2005 Cagliari	Light-heavyweight
Commonwealth Boxing Championships
Silver medal – second place	2005 Glasgow	Light-Heavyweight
Strandja Memorial
Silver medal – second place	2006 Pleven	Light-Heavyweight
Gee-Bee
Silver medal – second place	2005 Urheilutalo	Light-Heavyweight
Algirdas Socikas
Silver medal – second place	2005 Kaunas	Light-Heavyweight
European Junior Boxing Championships
Bronze medal – third place	2003 Warsaw	Middleweight
European Cadet Boxing Championships
Gold medal – first place	2001 Patras	Light Middleweight
English National Championships
Gold medal – first place	2006 London	Light-Heavyweight
Schoolboy National Boxing Championships
Gold medal – first place	2000 Barnsley	69 kg
Gold medal – first place	1999 Barnsley	63 kg

Tony David Jeffries (born Tony David Bryce; 2 March 1985) is a British former Professional boxer who competed from 2009 to 2011. As an amateur, he won the light-heavyweight bronze medal at the 2008 Olympics. In 2012, Jeffries was forced to retire due to hand injuries. He has since become a YouTuber who began posting boxing tutorials in 2007; he has amassed 2.56 million subscribers and 400 million views as of November 2024.

== Life and career ==
Jeffries was born in Sunderland, Tyne and Wear and grew up around the East Herrington area of the city whilst attending Farringdon Community Sports College. He began to box at the age of ten, inspired by his uncle William Young "Billy" Bryce, a former professional boxer. He joined Sunderland Amateur Boxing Club, and in 1999 won the School Boys' Championships, gold in the European Cadets (U17) in 2001 and won the juniors of the 2003 YMCA International Cup in New Delhi. He was also a semifinalist in the 2003 Junior Brandenburg Cup and 2003 European Junior Championships in Warsaw.

At the 2005 Commonwealth Championships he lost in the finals to Shawn Cox of Barbados, and in the quarterfinals of the 2006 Commonwealth Games he lost to Scotland's tourney winner Kenny Anderson at light-heavy (had right hand surgery after). In other open international competitions, he was a finalist in Kaunas Lithuania's 2005 Szocikas Tournament and Finland's 2005 GeeBee tournament and Bulgaria's 2006 Strandja Memorial.

At the 2007 World Amateur Boxing Championships he beat Daniel Kooij, Christopher Downs and Ramazan Magomedov in the preliminaries, but lost to Kazakhstan southpaw Yerkebuian Shynaliyev in the quarters. He did, however, qualify for the 2008 Olympics, becoming the first ever boxer from Tyne and Wear to do so. He won a bronze medal after losing to the Irish Boxer Kenny Egan in the semi-final round. Not long after, he presented his medal to the Sunderland people at the Stadium of Light, being a supporter of Sunderland A.F.C. Jeffries signed his first professional contract during the half-time break of Sunderland's match against the Bolton Wanderers on Saturday 29 November, after a row over unpaid bonuses from the Amateur Boxing Association of England.

On 23 September 2012, Tony Jeffries announced on Facebook that he has retired. The numerous issues with his hands and unsuccessful surgery and treatment left him with no choice but to retire. Tony now owns and works at Box 'N Burn boxing gym in Santa Monica, Los Angeles, with Kentucky fitness expert Kevan Watson.

Tony Jeffries began posting vlogs, podcasts, boxing tutorials, and self-defense tutorials on his YouTube channel in 2007. His podcast is named Box N' Life where he invited numerous guests but stopped podcasting in 2018.

=== World Amateur Championships results ===
2007 (as a Light heavyweight)

- Defeated Daniel Kooij (Netherlands) 13–6
- Defeated Christopher Downs (United States) 18–9
- Defeated Ramazan Magomedov (Belarus) 16–8
- Lost to Yerkabulan Shinaliev (Kazakhstan) 9–20

=== Olympic Games results ===
2008 (as a Light heavyweight)

- 1st round bye
- Defeated Eleider Álvarez (Colombia) 5–5
- Defeated Imre Szellő (Hungary) 10–2
- Lost to Kenneth Egan (Ireland) 3–10

== Retirement ==
Jeffries retired from boxing after his hands failed to heal following surgery attempting to address his long-term struggle with hand issues in 2012. Following his retirement, he moved to Los Angeles where he waited anticipating this healing process. Tony Jeffries started to work in a gym in Santa Monica where he met another trainer who is from Kentucky. Jeffries and his fellow trainer left this gym and started a boxing bootcamp in Santa Monica which received investment from actor Mickey Rourke. The terms of the premises were changed by Rourke contrary to what Jeffries and the other trainer originally agreed upon, so they went separate ways. The Santa Monica Bootcamp got voted Los Angeles' number 1 gym in 2013 on Yelp and the gym Box 'N Burn was successful after just a year of opening in 2014. Jeffries and the other trainer opened Box 'N Burn's second location in Brentwood, Los Angeles. Alongside his ventures in boxing, Jefferies played a role in NBC TV's Blacklist in 2013 and was one of the figures in Levi's world campaign in the same year. His Levi's modelling pictures were on billboards across the world. Tony was also the head trainer for MMA fighter Brendan Schaub, cornering him for his bouts against Matt Mitrione, and Travis Browne, which ultimately led to Schaub's retirement. He has also featured in the video for Cannonball (Skylar Grey song). In June 2022, Jeffries also starred in a Dhar Mann video.

== Brazilian jiu-jitsu career ==
Jeffries has taken up Brazilian jiu-jitsu since retiring from boxing and in 2024 he had first competition, winning a gold medal in a white belt masters division.

== Professional boxing record ==
10 fights	9 wins	0 losses
By knockout	6	0
By decision	3	0
Draws	1	

No.	Result	Record	Opponent	Type	Round, time	Date	Location	Notes
10	Win	9–0–1	Paul Morby	PTS	8	3 Sep 2011	Dome Leisure Centre, Doncaster, England	
9	Win	8–0–1	Tommy Tolan	KO	2 (8), 1:03	15 Dec 2010	Kings Hall, Belfast, Northern Ireland	
8	Draw	7–0–1	Michał Bańbuła	PTS	8	23 Jul 2010	Rainton Meadows Arena, Houghton-le-Spring, England	
7	Win	7–0	Matt Hainy	TKO	2 (6), 2:04	4 Jun 2010	Leisure Centre, Peterlee, England	
6	Win	6–0	Nathan King	PTS	6	23 Apr 2010	Coventry Skydome, Coventry, England	
5	Win	5–0	Andrejs Tolstihs	TKO	1 (6), 2:17	11 Dec 2009	Newport Centre, Newport, Wales	
4	Win	4–0	Artsiom Salomka	PTS	6	16 Oct 2009	Seaburn Centre, Sunderland, England	
3	Win	3–0	Iliya Shakura	TKO	1 (4), 1:36	10 Jul 2009	Seaburn Centre, Sunderland, England	
2	Win	2–0	Roy Meissner	TKO	2 (4), 1:27	2 May 2009	Crowtree Leisure Centre, Sunderland, England	
1	Win	1–0	Aliaksandr Vaiavoda	TKO	1 (4), 2:42	27 Feb 2009	Metrodome, Barnsley, England	
