= Song Hak-sung =

South Korean boxer (born 1979)

Personal information
- Nationality: South Korean
- Born: 2 July 1979 (age 45)

Sport
- Sport: Boxing

Song Hak-sung (born 2 July 1979) is a South Korean boxer. He competed in the men's light heavyweight event at the 2004 Summer Olympics.
