= Mehdi Ghorbani =

Iranian boxer (born 1988)

Personal information
- Born: January 12, 1988 (age 38)
Medal record
Representing Iran
Men's Boxing
Asian Games
Bronze medal – third place	2006 Doha	81 kg

Mehdi Ghorbani (Persian: مهدی قربانی, born January 12, 1988) is a professional boxer from the Islamic Republic of Iran who competed in the Light Heavyweight (-81 kg) division at the 2006 Asian Games winning the bronze medal in a lost semifinal bout against Tajikistan's Djakhon Kurbanov 10–30. He was born in Tehran, Iran.

At the first Olympic qualifier he lost to Zhang Xiaoping but at the second qualifier he qualified for the 2008 Olympics, where he later lost to Carlos Negron.
