= Mukhtarkhan Dildabekov =

Kazakhstani boxer (born 1976)

Personal information
- Full name: Mukhtarkhan Dildabekov
- Nationality: Kazakhstan
- Born: March 19, 1976 (age 50) Shymkent, Ontustik Qazaqstan, Kazakh SSR, Soviet Union
- Height: 1.97 m (6 ft 6 in)
- Weight: 97 kg (214 lb)

Sport
- Sport: Boxing
- Weight class: Super Heavyweight
Medal record
Olympic Games
| Silver medal – second place | 2000 Sydney | Super heavyweight |
World Amateur Championships
| Silver medal – second place | 1999 Houston | Super heavyweight |
Asian Games
| Gold medal – first place | 1998 Bangkok | Super heavyweight |
| Silver medal – second place | 2002 Busan | Super heavyweight |
| Silver medal – second place | 2006 Doha | Super heavyweight |
Asian Championships
| Silver medal – second place | 1999 Tashkent | Super heavyweight |
| Bronze medal – third place | 2004 Puerto Princesa | Super heavyweight |

Mukhtarkhan Qabylanbekuly Dildabekov (Kazakh: Мұхтархан Қабыланбекұлы Ділдәбеков, Mūhtarhan Qabylanbekūly Dıldäbekov; born March 19, 1976) is a Kazakh boxer, best known for winning the silver medal in the Super Heavyweight division (+91 kg) at the 2000 Summer Olympics.

== Career ==
Dildabekov (left) with Timur Ibragimov (center) at the King's Cup awards ceremony, Bangkok, 1998

At the 1999 World Amateur Boxing Championships in Houston, Texas, he won silver, losing to Sinan Şamil Sam.

At the 2000 Olympics, he lost in the final to the Briton Audley Harrison. On his way to the final, he defeated Cuban Alexis Rubalcaba and the Uzbek fighter Rustam Saidov. Results:

- Defeated Grzegorz Kiełsa (Poland) 16–5
- Defeated Alexis Rubalcaba (Cuba) 25–12
- Defeated Rustam Saidov (Uzbekistan) 28–22
- Lost to Audley Harrison (Great Britain) 16–30

He won gold at the Asian Games 1998 but had to settle for silver in 2002 and 2006 losing twice to Saidov. 2004 he finished third.

2003 at the world championships he lost to Sebastian Köber.

He beat him at the Olympics in Athens 2004, but lost to in an early round to eventual winner Alexander Povetkin. Dildabekov qualified for the 2004 Athens Games by ending up in first place at the 1st AIBA Asian 2004 Olympic Qualifying Tournament in Guangzhou, China. In the decisive final match of the event, he defeated Kyrgyzstan's Ruslan Abasov.
