= Jahon Qurbonov =

Tajikistani boxer

Personal information
- Full name: Джахон Курбонов
- Nationality: Tajikistani
- Born: 12 February 1986 (age 40) Leninabad, Tajik SSR, USSR
- Height: 1.86 m (6 ft 1 in)
- Weight: 81 kg (179 lb)

Sport
- Sport: Boxing
- Weight class: Light Heavyweight
Medal record
Asian Games
Gold medal – first place	2006 Doha	Light Heavyweight
Bronze medal – third place	2010 Guangzhou	Heavyweight
Asian Championships
Gold medal – first place	2005 Ho Chi Minh City	Middleweight

Jahon Qurbonov (Russian: Dzhakhon Kurbanov; born 12 February 1986, in Leninabad, now Khujand) is an amateur boxer from Tajikistan, who competed in the 2006 Asian Games in the Light Heavyweight (-81 kg) division. There he beat Mehdi Ghorbani in the semifinals and won the gold medal in a decisive final bout against Korea's Hak Sung Song 30–15.

At the 2007 World Championships he beat Luis Gonzalez but was DQd against Yerkebulan Shynaliyev.

At the 2008 Summer Olympics in Beijing, Qurbanov beat Abbos Atoev of Uzbekistan and then Croatia's Marijo Šivolija before being eliminated by Shynaliyev, again via DQ for biting.

He qualified for the 2012 Olympics in London, where he was knocked out by Yahia El-Mekachari in the first round.
