= Marijo Šivolija =

Croatian boxer

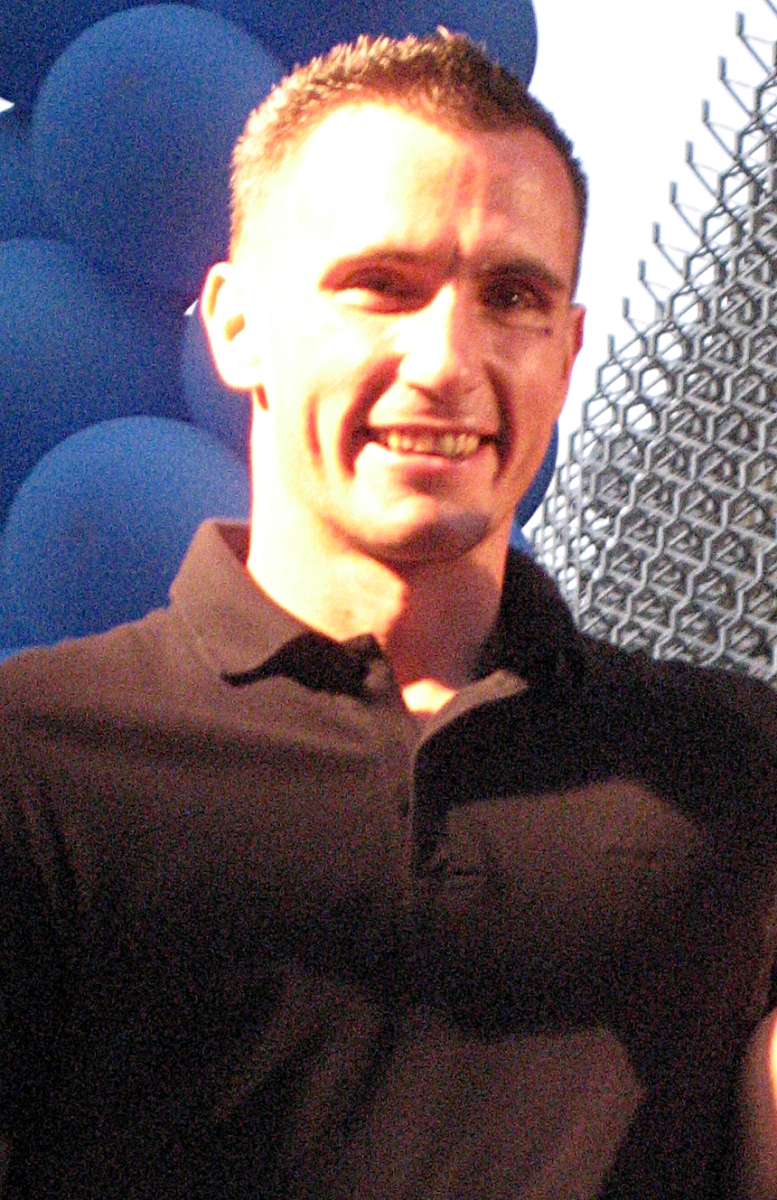
- Mario Šivolija-Jelica

Personal information
- Full name: Marijo Šivolija-Jelica
- Nationality: Croatia
- Born: 29 June 1981 (age 45) Omišalj, Primorje-Gorski
- Height: 1.87 m (6 ft 2 in)
- Weight: 81 kg (179 lb)

Sport
- Sport: Boxing
- Weight class: Light Heavyweight
- Club: BC Rijeka
Medal record
World Amateur Championships
Silver medal – second place	2005 Mianyang	Light Heavyweight
European Amateur Championships
Silver medal – second place	2004 Pula	Light Heavyweight
EU Amateur Championships
Silver medal – second place	2005 Cagliari	Light Heavyweight
Bronze medal – third place	2006 Pécs	Light Heavyweight
Bronze medal – third place	2007 Dublin	Light Heavyweight

Marijo Šivolija-Jelica (born 29 June 1981 in Omišalj) is a Croatian amateur boxer and two-time Olympian best known to medal repeatedly in international competition at light heavyweight.

He also manages heavyweight boxer Mark de Mori.

== Career ==
In 2003 he won a silver medal at the European Championships.

In Athens at the Olympics 2004 he was upset in the first round by Edgar Muñoz.

In 2005 he won a silver medal at the World Championships where he beat Armenian Artak Malumyan 20:10 in the semis but was defeated in the final by Kazakh Yerdos Dzhanabergenov 12:27.

At the Euros he was upset early by Frenchman Mamadou Diambang 23:27.

In 2007 at the World Championships he lost to eventual winner Abbos Atoev in the quarterfinals 6:17.

At the Olympics 2008 he lost his second match to Dzhakhon Kurbanov 1:8.

He has since become the manager of heavyweight boxer Mark de Mori.
