= Tony Bellew =

English boxer (born 1982)

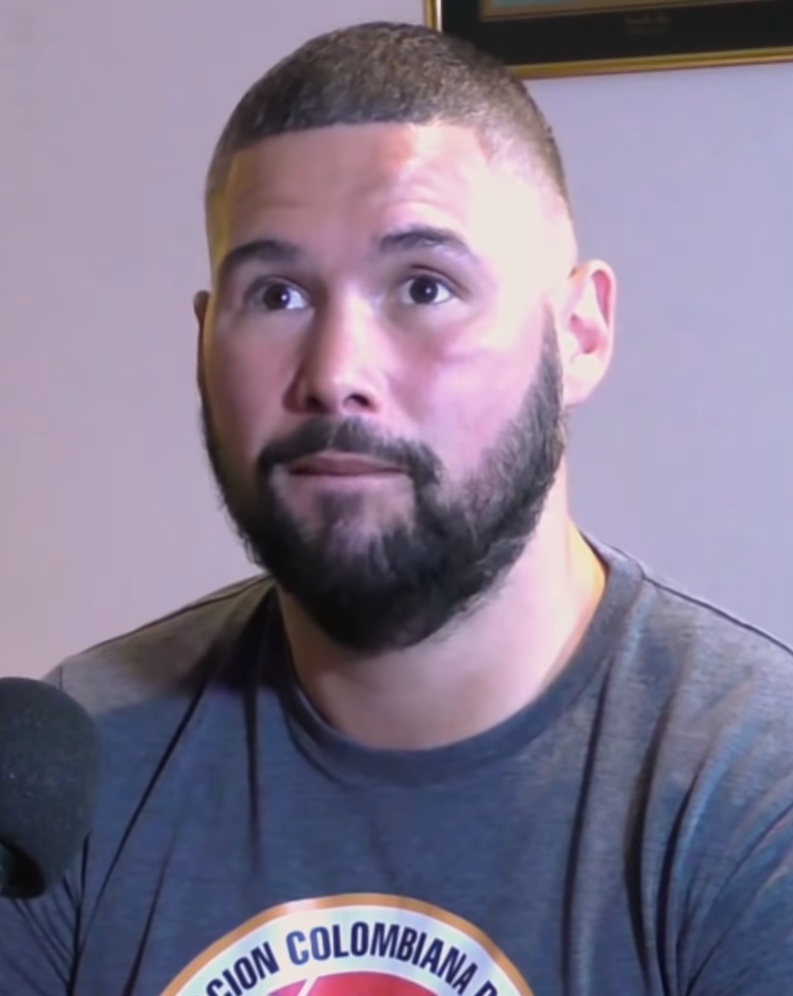
- Bellew in 2020

Personal information
- Nickname: Bomber
- Born: Anthony Lewis Bellew; 30 November 1982 (age 43) Liverpool, England
- Height: 6 ft 3 in (191 cm)
- Weight: Light-heavyweight; Cruiserweight; Heavyweight

Boxing career
- Reach: 74 in (188 cm)
- Stance: Orthodox

Boxing record
- Total fights: 34
- Wins: 30
- Win by KO: 20
- Losses: 3
- Draws: 1
Medal record
Men's amateur boxing
English National Championships
Gold medal – first place	2004 London	Heavyweight
Gold medal – first place	2005 London	Heavyweight
Gold medal – first place	2006 London	Heavyweight
Silver medal – second place	2007 London	Heavyweight

Anthony Lewis Bellew (born 30 November 1982) is an English former professional boxer who competed from 2007 to 2018, and has since worked as a boxing analyst and commentator. He held the World Boxing Council (WBC) cruiserweight title from 2016 to 2017. At regional level, he held the British and Commonwealth light-heavyweight titles between 2010 and 2014, and the European cruiserweight title from 2015 to 2016. As an amateur, he is a three-time ABA heavyweight champion. He portrayed antagonist boxer Ricky Conlan in the films Creed and Creed III.

== Early life ==
Anthony Lewis Bellew was born in the Toxteth area of Liverpool on 30 November 1982. Bellew's father was white, while his mother was biracial, with both black/African and white/European ancestry. He first lived on Mulgrave Street in Toxteth, later moving to Smithdown Road in nearby Wavertree.

== Professional career ==
=== Light-heavyweight ===
==== Early career ====
Bellew made his professional boxing debut on 6 October 2007 with a 2nd-round TKO against journeyman Jamie Ambler. He followed up the victory with further wins in 2007 over Adam Wilcox, fighting at the Millennium Stadium in Cardiff and Wayne Brooks at the Bolton Arena.

In 2008 Bellew defeated Paul Bonson, Ayitey Powers, Hastings Rasani, Jevgēņijs Andrejevs, and Phil Goodwin to take his record up to 8–0. During 2009 he advanced to an unbeaten 12–0 with further wins against Matthew Ellis, Nick Okoth, Jindrich Velecky, and Martial Bella Oleme.

==== Commonwealth champion ====
On 12 March 2010 Bellew challenged for the vacant Commonwealth light-heavyweight title, defeating Atoli Moore at the Echo Arena in Liverpool. He made his first defence of the title on 24 September 2010, defeating Bob Ajisafe at the Grosvenor House Hotel in London with Bellew having to recover from a flash knockdown during the fight. He made his second defence of the title on 9 December 2010, returning to the Echo Arena to stop former Commonwealth champion Ovill McKenzie in the eighth-round despite suffering two knockdowns himself in both the first and second rounds.

On 18 May 2011 it was announced that Bellew would challenge Nathan Cleverly for the WBO light-heavyweight title following a pullout from Cleverly's scheduled opponent Jürgen Brähmer with the fight due to be held only three days later on 21 May 2011. Bellew however, failed to make the weight and was replaced with Aleksy Kuziemski. On 16 July 2011 Bellew made the third defence of his Commonwealth title and also won the vacant British title with a repeat victory over Ovill McKenzie, with the bout this time lasting the full twelve rounds.

==== Bellew vs. Cleverly ====
It was announced that Bellew would fight Nathan Cleverly in Liverpool, on 15 October 2011, for the WBO light-heavyweight title. Cleverly won the fight via majority decision (MD). One judge scored the bout at 114–114 whereas the other two judges scored the bout at 116–113, and 117–112.

After losing to Cleverly, Bellew took on Danny McIntosh for the vacant British light-heavyweight title, knocking McIntosh out in the fifth round. Next he took on former world title challenger Edison Miranda for the WBC International title, and stopped Miranda in the ninth round.

==== Bellew vs. Chilemba I, II ====
On 17 November 2012 he beat Roberto Bolonti for the WBC Silver title. Bellew was cut badly but went the full twelve rounds to a win unanimous decision (UD), taking him one step further to a second world title fight. On 30 March 2013, he fought Isaac Chilemba in a title eliminator. The judges scored it a controversial draw. Chilemba granted a rematch which Bellew won on the scorecards after twelve rounds via UD (unanimous decision), with 117–112, and 116–112 twice.

==== Bellew vs. Stevenson ====
Bellew was made mandatory challenger for the WBC light-heavyweight title following the win against Chilemba. However, a fight between Adonis Stevenson and Tavoris Cloud occurred on 28 September 2013 with the winner being made to defend his title against Bellew before the end of the year. Stevenson became the first boxer to stop Bellew, winning the fight via technical knockout (TKO). In round six, Stevenson put Bellew down with a left hand, he beat the count and the referee let the fight go on. Bellew was then on the receiving end of another pair of left hands before the referee could get in and put a stop to the bout. At the time of stoppage, Stevenson was ahead on the scorecards with 50–45 twice, and 49–46. Bellew contemplated moving up to cruiserweight after the loss. According to Nielsen Media Research firm, the fight attracted an average of 1.3 million viewers on the HBO network, making it the fifth most watched bout of 2013.

=== Cruiserweight ===
Bellew celebrated his first fight as a cruiserweight with a twelfth-round knockout (KO) of Valery Brudov on 15 March 2014 at the Echo Arena in Liverpool. This was for the vacant WBO International cruiserweight title. Bellew successfully defended the title on 12 July 2014 against Julio Cesar Dos Santos via fifth-round TKO. Dos Santos went down following a left to the jaw.

==== Bellew vs. Cleverly II ====
On 22 November 2014 Bellew got his rematch against Nathan Cleverly, this time fighting as cruiserweights. The fight took place at the Echo Arena in Liverpool also a WBO cruiserweight championship eliminator. The title was held by Marco Huck at the time. The bout went twelve rounds as Bellew won via split decision (SD). One judge scored the bout 115–114 in favour of Cleverly whereas the other two judges scored the bout 116–112, and 115–113 in favour of Bellew. In the post-fight interview, Bellew said, "I'm over the moon, listen it's over, it's put to bed. We said a lot of things. I don't like him now, but it's been settled tonight. It's over, it's done and I've outworked a great athlete." He also stated that he would accept a rematch at Millennium Stadium if there was any demand for it. Cleverly said he struggled with dealing with Bellew at a higher weight. After the fight, Cleverly moved back down to light-heavyweight.

In 2015, Bellew fought two lower ranked opponents, defeating Ivica Bačurin via tenth-round TKO and Artūrs Kuļikauskis via fifth-round TKO.

==== Bellew vs. Masternak ====
On 29 November 2015, Sky Sports confirmed that Bellew would fight highly ranked contender and former world title challenger Mateusz Masternak (36–3, 26 KOs) for the vacant European cruiserweight title. The fight took place on 12 December at the O2 Arena in London, as part of the undercard for Anthony Joshua vs. Dillian Whyte. Bellew produced a solid performance as the fight with Masternak was back and forth throughout. Going into the twelfth round, Bellew was winning by one round. Bellew won the fight via UD, with scores of 115–113, and 115–112 twice to capture the European title. Bellew earned an £80,000 purse for the bout.

==== Bellew vs. Makabu ====
On 29 May 2016, Bellew challenged for the WBC cruiserweight title, vacated by Grigory Drozd, who had been injured and not fought since his KO win in May 2015. Bellew faced Ilunga Makabu (19–1, 18 KOs), who had not lost since his debut back in 2008, at Goodison Park in Liverpool. Makabu was scheduled to fight Drozd, only for the Russian to pull out with an injury, prompting the WBC to strip him. Bellew weighed in at 14st 3lbs 1oz while Makabu took to the scales at just over 14st. Bellew overcame a first-round knockdown to KO Makabu and become WBC champion, winning his first world title. During the post-fight interview, Bellew called out Denis Lebedev, but not in Russia and David Haye at cruiserweight.

==== Bellew vs. Flores ====
Bellew announced he would be making his first voluntary defence of his world title at the Echo Arena on 15 October, against 37-year-old BJ Flores (32–2–1, 20 KOs) live on Sky Sports. This was the first time Flores challenged for a major world title, having previously fought for an interim title and the IBO title. The WBC stated the winner had to fight Mairis Briedis next, the mandatory challenger, following his win over Olanrewaju Durodola. Briedis also fought on the undercard, stopping unbeaten prospect Simon Vallily. Briedis agreed to take a step aside fee to allow this fight to take place.

After an even first round, the second round produced more action as Bellew hit Flores with a low blow. The referee did not see this as below the belt, however, Flores stopped for a few seconds to motion the referee that he had been hit with a low blow. Whilst doing so, Bellew piled on more pressure, eventually knocking Flores down. Bellew knocked Flores down a further two times in round two, securing a 10–6 round in his favour. After a fourth knockdown in round three, Flores failed to beat the referee's count, the referee declaring Bellew the winner via KO and Bellew making a first successful defence of his WBC title. Following the win, Bellew called out former Cruiserweight and heavyweight world champion David Haye, who was ringside, repeating that he was next. Referring to Haye as 'SpongeBob', Bellew carried on the verbal assault in the post-fight interview using profanity and taunting Haye, stating he has been 'conning the British public' since he announced his comeback. Eddie Hearn claimed the fight could take place at heavyweight or at cruiserweight for Bellew's WBC title.

=== Heavyweight ===
==== Bellew vs. Haye I, II ====
On 25 November 2016, Eddie Hearn announced via Twitter that Bellew's next fight would be against Haye. The fight date was set for 4 March 2017 at The O2 Arena, London and was shown on Sky Box Office and was Bellew's first heavyweight fight. Due to the fight being at heavyweight, Bellew's WBC cruiserweight title was not on the line.

At the first press conference on 30 November, a fight broke out as Bellew and Haye went face to face and it appeared on the replay, Haye had managed to land a left hook on Bellew, leaving a mark. Both fighters were then separated before going their ways. On 3 March 2017, Haye weighed 224.9 lbs, heavier than Bellew who came in at 213 lbs, a career high. The bout started as a stalemate until the sixth round, where Haye injured his ankle and fell twice. Bellew then took control of the fight as Haye opted to continue. Bellew knocked Haye down and out of the ropes late in the eleventh round. Haye managed to make it to his feet, but his trainer Shane McGuigan threw in the towel, giving Bellew a TKO win. Bellew credited Haye for his bravery, while Haye refused to blame his injury and stated that Bellew was "by far the better fighter", though stated that he wanted a rematch. Bellew contemplated retiring after claiming he had done it all. He also revealed he broke his hand in the early rounds. At the time of stoppage, Bellew led on all three scorecards 96–93. With a 60–40 split of the £7 million purse, Haye earned £4.2 million while Bellew earned £2.8 million, his biggest purse by far. It was reported that the fight generated 890,000 buys on Sky Box Office PPV.

On 14 March, Hearn said that Bellew would fight again in 2017, a day later, he told Sky Sports that Bellew may need surgery on his broken hand which could see him out of action for up to five months. On 28 March, the WBC changed Bellew's world championship status to emeritus champion. This also meant the winner between Marco Huck and Mairis Briedis on 1 April would become new world champion and not interim, as it was initially announced. The bout was won by Briedis, thus making him the new WBC champion. In June 2017, Bellew stated that he would next fight in either November or December 2017. He had three potential names to consider, those being WBO heavyweight champion Joseph Parker, WBC heavyweight champion Deontay Wilder and a rematch with Haye. Parker was his main interest.

In July 2017, Bellew admitted that a potential fight with widely regarded pound for pound number one fighter and unified light-heavyweight champion Andre Ward was of interest and the teams of the respective fighters were currently in negotiations. On 3 August, Hearn stated a rematch between Bellew and Haye was 'virtually dead', due to both fighters believing they are the A-side and have the right to demand ring walks, poster, changing rooms and split of purse. On 6 September, Hearn stated a deal could be made within seven days. According to trainer David Coldwell, both Haye and Bellew had held positive talks and looking more likely to agree to a fight, as long they stay on the same page and agree to the same terms. On 19 September, Haye agreed all the terms and tweeted Bellew to sign the contract. He said, "It's taken months of negotiating but teams have finally agreed all terms for Haye-Bellew 2. Will Bellew put pen to paper?" The fight was reported to take place on Sunday 17 December 2017. Promoter Eddie Hearn stated the fight was not a done deal, but he had hoped to confirm the fight within a week. Bellew replied the following day, tweeting, "I OBLIGE YOU @mrdavidhaye , happy? Now leave me alone with my family please. I'll see you soon enough!" The fight was officially confirmed on 29 September for the fight to take place at The O2 Arena in London. Bellew claimed the rematch wasn't personal any more, just business and hoping to dedicate a win to his late brother-in-law, who had died in August. Haye stated that Bellew wouldn't win the lottery twice. Like the first fight, it was scheduled to be shown live on Sky Box Office.

On 20 November, it was reported that Haye had injured his arm and forced to pull out of the fight. In a statement, Haye said, "I am devastated to announce my much-anticipated rematch against Tony Bellew has been postponed until 24 March or 5 May, subject to scheduling. It was believed that the injury occurred during a stair conditioning session." Bellew was said to be disappointed with Haye's announcement, but stated he may take an interim bout. Hours after the cancellation was confirmed, Tyson Fury released a video on social media calling out Bellew. In the video, he said, "I'll be ready, willing and waiting to fight Tony Bellew, May 5, O2 Arena, London." Dillian Whyte tweeted Hearn about taking Haye's place and then called Bellew a coward for declining the fight. Speaking about a potential Fury fight, trainer Dave Coldwell said, "That's not a fight I would entertain whatsoever. Fury is big, long and very, very clever in that ring. There's no way that I'd be interested in that fight." Fury himself denigrated Bellew and his corner stating that: "They are not good enough to tie my shoelaces. They're not good enough to hold my jock strap." The fight was rescheduled for 5 May 2018. Haye weighed 220.2 lbs, 4 lbs lighter than the first fight. Bellew also came in lighter 210.4 lbs.

Bellew knocked Haye down three times, eventually winning the fight via TKO in round five. Haye started the opening two rounds using his jab, leaving a mark around Bellew's right eye. As round three began, both boxers started getting closer and unloading power shots. As Haye started to step backwards around the ring, Bellew landed clean, dropping Haye. At this point it appeared Haye may have injured his ankle, with the Sky Sports commentary team mentioning this, as well as the post-fight interviewer. Haye later denied he was injured. Bellew then dropped Haye again with a hard combination. Bellew came out cautiously in round four, still wary of Haye's power. In round five, both traded punches, but it was a left hook from Bellew that dropped Haye a third time. Haye managed to beat the count again, not long before Bellew started unloading a barrage of punches. With Haye against the ropes, referee Howard Foster stepped in at 2 minutes 14 seconds, giving Bellew his second stoppage win over Haye. Immediately after the fight Haye congratulated Bellew on the win. Bellew went on to dedicate the win to Ashley, his brother-in-law, who had died in August 2017. He also mentioned Andre Ward, who his team had brief negotiations with in 2017. Haye stated he would review the tapes and see what went wrong. According to CompuBox stats, Haye landed 42 of 189 punches thrown (22%), only 6 being power punches and Bellew landed 70 of his 219 thrown (32%), with 34 being power punches. Both boxers earned a minimum purse of £2.5 million for the fight, which would increase based on TV revenue and PPV shares.

=== Return to cruiserweight ===
==== Bellew vs. Usyk ====
On 21 July 2018, Oleksandr Usyk (15–0, 11 KOs) defeated Murat Gassiev via UD to become the undisputed cruiserweight world champion. When asked who he would like to fight next, Usyk said, "At this time I have heard that Tony Bellew wants to fight the winner of the Muhammad Ali Trophy. I hope he will see me talking.... 'hey Tony Bellew, are you ready?' If he doesn't want to go down, I will go up for him. I will eat more spaghetti for my dinner!" Bellew responded via social media that he would accept the fight, however stated the fight would need to take place in 2018 and for the undisputed championship. Bellew believed a fight at heavyweight would not be as appealing as he would not gain much with a win. Bellew also stated it would be his last fight as a professional. By the end of July, it was said the fight would likely take place in November 2018 in London. After positive meetings between Eddie Hearn and K2's Alexander Krassyuk, on 20 August, Boxing Scene reported the fight was likely to take place on 10 November 2018. A week later, K2 Promotions confirmed the date of the fight. On 5 September, the WBA ordered Usyk to start negotiating with Denis Lebedev, who was their 'champion in recess' and gave them until the first week of October 2018 to complete negotiations. This was said to be a stumbling block for the potential Usyk vs. Bellew fight. According to Hearn, the fight was likely to be pushed back to 2019. Prior to negotiations, Bellew stated the fight must happen in 2018. On 7 September, Usyk signed a multi-fight deal with Matchroom Boxing, which meant he would fight exclusively on Sky Sports in the UK and DAZN in the US. A week after signing with Matchroom, the Usyk vs. Bellew fight was announced to take place on 10 November at the Manchester Arena, live and exclusive on Sky Box Office. Experienced British referee Terry O'Connor was named as the official. Bellew weighed 199¼ lbs, just over 2 years since he last made the cruiserweight limit and Usyk weighed 198¼ lbs. Bellew's guaranteed purse for the fight was £4 million.

On fight night, Usyk, who is usually a slow starter, eventually took full control of the bout and stopped Bellew in round eight to retain all the cruiserweight belts. The official time of the stoppage was at 2 minutes of round eight. There was very little action in round one as both boxers showed each other respect. Due to the lack of action, the crowd began to boo towards the end of the round. Overall, Usyk landed just three jabs and Bellew landed one power shot. Round two was similar, however Bellew stepped on the gas and landed some clean shots along with some showboating. Bellew took control in round three, landing two straight right hands. Usyk began using his jab more and after landing an overhand left, Bellew was left slightly shaken. By the end of round four, Bellew was backed up against the ropes and looked to tire. Bellew aimed most of his shots to Usyk's body and by round seven, was missing a lot of shots, mostly due to Usyk's foot movement, and ended the round with a bloodied nose. In round eight, whilst in a neutral corner, Usyk landed a hard left, again buzzing Bellew, forcing him to move away against the ropes. Another left hand wobbled Bellew before Usyk finished him off with another left which dropped Bellew backwards with his head landing on the bottom rope. A brave Bellew tried to get up slowly and beat the count but referee Terry O'Connor stopped the fight. Bellew's ten-fight winning streak came to an end. Judges Alejandro Cid and Steve Gray scored the first seven rounds 68–65 and 67–66 respectively in favour of Bellew, while Yury Koptsev had the fight 67–67.

Afterwards, Bellew paid tribute to Usyk and announced his retirement from boxing, saying, "I have been doing this for 20 years, and it is over." Usyk stated 2018 was the most difficult year of his career, but most successful. "We need to put goals in front of us and move towards them," Usyk later stated. There was a small concern during Bellew's post-fight interview as many felt he was clearly concussed. According to CompuBox stats, Usyk landed 112 of his 424 punches thrown (26%) and Bellew landed 61 of his 268 thrown (23%). Both landed 47 power shots each.

=== Retirement ===
Bellew announced his retirement in the ring following his defeat to Usyk. He retired with a record of 30 wins from 34 professional bouts, with 20 coming inside the distance. He suffered 3 losses and one draw. All three losses came against reigning world champions. During the post-fight press conference, Bellew stated, "It's definitely over now, you won't see me in a boxing ring again. I just want a normal life, I don't want this pressure. I only created the name Tony Bellew to make my dad proud. I've never been Tony Bellew, I've always been Anthony. Everyone who truly knows me calls me Anthony. Tony Bellew died on Saturday, Anthony Bellew comes back alive. I want reality back." He claimed his body could no longer take it. On 22 November 2018, via social media, Bellew posted a video and a statement officially confirming his retirement from boxing.

In 2021, Tony Bellew joined the UK commentary team for DAZN, contributing to their UK boxing coverage and schedule.

== Personal life ==
Bellew and his wife, Rachael, have four sons. He is an avid supporter of his home town football team Everton F.C., and has been paraded on the pitch at Goodison Park before a home game against Cardiff City in November 2018. During his career, he entered the ring to the "Theme from Z-Cars", the same song to which the team enters the pitch at their home ground.

== Outside boxing ==
In 2020, Tony took part in the 2nd series of the Channel 4 Show SAS: Who Dares Wins, which was filmed on the island of Raasay in Scotland. He was culled in episode 6.

In 2023, Bellew was a contestant in the 23rd series of I'm a Celebrity...Get Me Out of Here!, entering as a late arrival alongside jockey Frankie Dettori where he finished runner-up to Sam Thompson.

Since retiring from boxing, he has appeared on TV shows such as Football Focus and Gogglebox, amongst others.

== Professional boxing record ==
34 fights	30 wins	3 losses
By knockout	20	2
By decision	10	1
Draws	1	

No.	Result	Record	Opponent	Type	Round, time	Date	Location	Notes
34	Loss	30–3–1	Oleksandr Usyk	KO	8 (12), 2:00	10 Nov 2018	Manchester Arena, Manchester, England	For WBA (Super), WBC, IBF, WBO, and The Ring cruiserweight titles
33	Win	30–2–1	David Haye	TKO	5 (12), 2:14	5 May 2018	The O2 Arena, London, England	
32	Win	29–2–1	David Haye	TKO	11 (12), 2:16	4 Mar 2017	The O2 Arena, London, England	
31	Win	28–2–1	BJ Flores	KO	3 (12), 2:11	15 Oct 2016	Echo Arena, Liverpool, England	Retained WBC cruiserweight title
30	Win	27–2–1	Ilunga Makabu	KO	3 (12), 1:20	29 May 2016	Goodison Park, Liverpool, England	Won vacant WBC cruiserweight title
29	Win	26–2–1	Mateusz Masternak	UD	12	12 Dec 2015	The O2 Arena, London, England	Won vacant European cruiserweight title
28	Win	25–2–1	Artūrs Kuļikauskis	TKO	5 (8), 2:07	5 Sep 2015	First Direct Arena, Leeds, England	
27	Win	24–2–1	Ivica Bačurin	TKO	10 (10), 1:12	26 Jun 2015	Echo Arena, Liverpool, England	
26	Win	23–2–1	Nathan Cleverly	SD	12	22 Nov 2014	Echo Arena, Liverpool, England	
25	Win	22–2–1	Julio Cesar Dos Santos	TKO	5 (12), 1:17	12 Jul 2014	Echo Arena, Liverpool, England	Retained WBO International cruiserweight title
24	Win	21–2–1	Valery Brudov	KO	12 (12), 2:24	15 Mar 2014	Echo Arena, Liverpool, England	Won vacant WBO International cruiserweight title
23	Loss	20–2–1	Adonis Stevenson	TKO	6 (12), 1:50	30 Nov 2013	Colisée Pepsi, Quebec City, Quebec, Canada	For WBC and The Ring light-heavyweight titles
22	Win	20–1–1	Isaac Chilemba	UD	12	25 May 2013	The O2 Arena, London, England	Retained WBC Silver light-heavyweight title
21	Draw	19–1–1	Isaac Chilemba	SD	12	30 Mar 2013	Echo Arena, Liverpool, England	Retained WBC Silver light-heavyweight title
20	Win	19–1	Roberto Bolonti	UD	12	17 Nov 2012	Capital FM Arena, Nottingham, England	Won vacant WBC Silver light-heavyweight title
19	Win	18–1	Edison Miranda	TKO	9 (12), 1:54	8 Sep 2012	Alexandra Palace, London, England	Won vacant WBC International Silver light-heavyweight title
18	Win	17–1	Danny McIntosh	KO	5 (12), 0:38	27 Apr 2012	Echo Arena, Liverpool, England	Retained British light-heavyweight title
17	Loss	16–1	Nathan Cleverly	MD	12	15 Oct 2011	Echo Arena, Liverpool, England	For WBO light-heavyweight title
16	Win	16–0	Ovill McKenzie	UD	12	16 Jul 2011	Echo Arena, Liverpool, England	Retained Commonwealth light-heavyweight title; Won vacant British light-heavyweight title
15	Win	15–0	Ovill McKenzie	TKO	8 (12), 2:46	11 Dec 2010	Echo Arena, Liverpool, England	Retained Commonwealth light-heavyweight title
14	Win	14–0	Bob Ajisafe	UD	12	24 Sep 2010	Grosvenor House Hotel, London, England	Retained Commonwealth light-heavyweight title
13	Win	13–0	Atoli Moore	TKO	1 (12), 2:27	12 Mar 2010	Echo Arena, Liverpool, England	Won vacant Commonwealth light-heavyweight title
12	Win	12–0	Martial Bella Oleme	PTS	6	5 Dec 2009	Metro Radio Arena, Newcastle, England	
11	Win	11–0	Jindrich Velecky	TKO	1 (8), 1:28	30 Oct 2009	Echo Arena, Liverpool, England	
10	Win	10–0	Nick Okoth	TKO	3 (8)	18 Sep 2009	Marriott Hotel Grosvenor Square, London, England	
9	Win	9–0	Mathew Ellis	TKO	4 (6), 0:37	15 May 2009	Odyssey Arena, Belfast, Northern Ireland	
8	Win	8–0	Phil Goodwin	KO	2 (4), 1:49	12 Dec 2008	Kingsway Leisure Centre, Widnes, England	
7	Win	7–0	Jevgēņijs Andrejevs	PTS	4	10 Oct 2008	Everton Park Sports Centre, Liverpool, England	
6	Win	6–0	Hastings Rasani	TKO	1 (4), 1:52	6 Sep 2008	Manchester Arena, Manchester, England	
5	Win	5–0	Ayitey Powers	PTS	4	10 Jul 2008	Goresbrook Leisure Centre, London, England	
4	Win	4–0	Paul Bonson	PTS	4	5 Apr 2008	Bolton Arena, Bolton, England	
3	Win	3–0	Wayne Brooks	KO	3 (4), 3:00	8 Dec 2007	Bolton Arena, Bolton, England	
2	Win	2–0	Adam Wilcox	TKO	3 (4), 1:56	3 Nov 2007	Millennium Stadium, Cardiff, Wales	
1	Win	1–0	Jamie Ambler	TKO	2 (4), 1:00	6 Oct 2007	Nottingham Arena, Nottingham, England	

== Titles in boxing ==
=== Major world titles ===
- WBC cruiserweight champion (200 lbs)

=== Silver world titles (Note: In 2010, the WBC created the "Silver Championship", intended as a replacement for interim titles.) ===
- WBC Silver light-heavyweight champion (175 lbs)

=== Regional/International titles ===
- WBC International Silver light-heavyweight champion (175 lbs)
- WBO International light-heavyweight champion (175 lbs)
- Commonwealth light-heavyweight champion (175 lbs)
- British light-heavyweight champion (175 lbs)
- European cruiserweight champion (200 lbs)

=== Honorary titles ===
- WBC Emeritus Champion

== Pay-per-view bouts ==
United Kingdom
Date	Fight	Network	Buys	Source
22 Nov 2014	Bellew vs. Cleverly II	Sky Box Office	131,000	
4 Mar 2017	Haye vs. Bellew	Sky Box Office	1,515,000	
5 May 2018	Bellew vs. Haye II	Sky Box Office	1,048,000	
9 Nov 2018	Usyk vs. Tony Bellew	Sky Box Office	819,000	
Total sales		Sky Box Office	3,513,000	

== Filmography ==
Year	Title	Role	Notes
2015	Creed	"Pretty" Ricky Conlan	
2020	Celebrity SAS: Who Dares Wins	Contestant	
2023	Creed III	"Pretty" Ricky Conlan	
2023	I'm A Celebrity... Get Me Out of Here!	Contestant; Series 23	Runner up

== Notes and references ==
=== References ===
Sporting positions
Amateur boxing titles
Previous: Mick O'Connell	ABA heavyweight champion 2004–2006	Next: John Dickenson
Regional boxing titles
Vacant Title last held by Nathan Cleverly	Commonwealth light-heavyweight champion 12 March 2010 – 16 July 2011; Vacated	Vacant Title next held by Ovill McKenzie
Vacant Title last held by Nathan Cleverly	British light-heavyweight champion 16 July 2011 – March 2014; Vacated	Vacant Title next held by Bob Ajisafe
New title	WBC International Silver light-heavyweight champion 12 March 2010 – 17 November 2012; Won full Silver title	Vacant Title next held by Ryno Liebenberg
Vacant Title last held by Mikkel Kessler	WBC Silver light-heavyweight champion 17 November 2012 – 30 November 2013; Lost bid for world title	Vacant Title next held by Ryno Liebenberg
Vacant Title last held by Neil Dawson	WBO International cruiserweight champion 15 March 2014 – November 2014; Vacated	Vacant Title next held by Noel Gevor
Vacant Title last held by Rakhim Chakhkiev	European cruiserweight champion 12 December 2015 – 6 January 2016; Vacated	Vacant Title next held by Dmytro Kucher
World boxing titles
Vacant Title last held by Grigory Drozd as champion in recess	WBC cruiserweight champion 29 May 2016 – 28 March 2017; Status changed	Vacant Title next held by Mairis Briedis
