= Dmitry Sukhotsky =

Russian boxer

Dmitry Sukhotsky Дмитрий Сухотский
Personal information
- Nickname: The Hunter
- Born: Dmitry Vladimirovich Sukhotsky; 16 May 1981 (age 45) Pavlovsk, Pushkinsky, Saint Petersburg, Soviet Union
- Height: 1.81 m (5 ft 11 in)
- Weight: Super-middleweight; Light-heavyweight

Boxing career
- Reach: 192 cm (76 in)
- Stance: Orthodox

Boxing record
- Total fights: 31
- Wins: 23
- Win by KO: 16
- Losses: 8

Dmitry Vladimirovich Sukhotsky (Russian: Дмитрий Владимирович Сухотский; born 16 May 1981) is a Russian professional boxer who has challenged twice for a light-heavyweight world title, in 2009 and 2014.

== Professional career ==
Sukhotsky made his professional debut on 1 December 2005, stopping Andrey Simonov in one round. For the next four years, Sukhotsky remained undefeated while fighting at super-middleweight exclusively in Russia. On 19 December 2009, he travelled abroad for the first time to fight WBO light-heavyweight champion Jürgen Brähmer in his native Germany, but lost a clear unanimous decision (UD). He would stay at light-heavyweight for his next four successful outings, all in Russia, until a second UD loss to Cornelius White on 14 July 2012.

A second opportunity at a world title came on 19 December 2014, this time against WBC, Ring magazine and lineal light-heavyweight champion Adonis Stevenson. After four uncompetitive rounds, Sukhotsky was brutally knocked out in the fifth.

== Professional boxing record ==
| 31 fights | 23 wins | 8 losses |
|---|---|---|
| By knockout | 16 | 4 |
| By decision | 7 | 4 |

| No. | Result | Record | Opponent | Type | Round, time | Date | Location | Notes |
|---|---|---|---|---|---|---|---|---|
| 31 | Loss | 23–8 | Ali Izmailov | UD | 6 | 12 Oct 2019 | Arēna Rīga, Riga, Latvia | |
| 30 | Loss | 23–7 | Paweł Stępień | TKO | 9 (10), 0:30 | 10 Nov 2018 | Gliwice Arena, Gliwice, Poland | For Republic of Poland International title |
| 29 | Loss | 23–6 | Ulugbek Khakberdiev | TKO | 6 (8), 1:57 | 30 Sep 2017 | Sports Palace Quant, Moscow, Russia | |
| 28 | Loss | 23–5 | Steve Geffrard | RTD | 7 (12), 3:00 | 3 Dec 2016 | Bao'an Stadium, Shenzhen, China | For vacant WBO Asia Pacific light-heavyweight title |
| 27 | Win | 23–4 | Apti Ustarkhanov | SD | 12 | 27 Nov 2015 | Sport Palace, Barnaul, Russia | Won vacant CISBB super-middleweight title |
| 26 | Loss | 22–4 | Dilmurod Satybaldiev | SD | 12 | 23 Aug 2015 | Mriya Resort & Spa, Yalta, Crimea | For vacant WBA Continental (Europe) super-middleweight title |
| 25 | Loss | 22–3 | Adonis Stevenson | KO | 5 (12), 2:42 | 19 Dec 2014 | Colisée Pepsi, Quebec City, Quebec, Canada | For WBC and The Ring light-heavyweight titles |
| 24 | Win | 22–2 | Joseph Lubega | UD | 12 | 6 Jun 2014 | Sport Palace, Barnaul, Russia | |
| 23 | Win | 21–2 | Eduard Gutknecht | RTD | 4 (12), 3:00 | 23 Nov 2013 | Stechert Arena, Bamberg, Germany | |
| 22 | Win | 20–2 | Mikhail Krinitsin | KO | 3 (10), 1:25 | 4 Jun 2013 | Sport Palace, Barnaul, Russia | |
| 21 | Win | 19–2 | Volodymyr Borovskyy | TKO | 1 (6), 2:36 | 8 Dec 2012 | Sport Service, Podolsk, Russia | |
| 20 | Loss | 18–2 | Cornelius White | UD | 12 | 14 Jul 2012 | Pearl Concert Theater, Paradise, Nevada, US | For vacant IBF International light-heavyweight title |
| 19 | Win | 18–1 | Nadjib Mohammedi | TKO | 2 (12), 2:18 | 8 Oct 2011 | Typhoon Club, Saint Petersburg, Russia | Retained WBO Inter-Continental light-heavyweight title |
| 18 | Win | 17–1 | Konstantin Piternov | TKO | 5 (12), 2:40 | 11 Mar 2011 | Athletic Arena, Kemerovo, Russia | Retained WBO Inter-Continental light-heavyweight title |
| 17 | Win | 16–1 | Aleksy Kuziemski | TKO | 6 (12), 1:34 | 29 Oct 2010 | Yubileyny Sports Palace, Saint Petersburg, Russia | Won EBA and vacant WBO Inter-Continental light-heavyweight titles |
| 16 | Win | 15–1 | Pablo Daniel Zamora Nievas | TKO | 1 (12), 1:36 | 27 Apr 2010 | Yubileyny Sports Palace, Saint Petersburg, Russia | Won vacant IBF International light-heavyweight title |
| 15 | Loss | 14–1 | Jürgen Brähmer | UD | 12 | 19 Dec 2009 | Sport- und Kongresshalle, Schwerin, Germany | For WBO light-heavyweight title |
| 14 | Win | 14–0 | Juan Nelongo | TKO | 8 (12), 2:11 | 25 Sep 2009 | Atmosphere Night Club, Saint Petersburg, Russia | Won vacant WBO European light-heavyweight title |
| 13 | Win | 13–0 | Ihar Filonau | KO | 1 (6) | 2 Jul 2009 | Gladiator Fight Club, Saint Petersburg, Russia | |
| 12 | Win | 12–0 | Amilcar Medina da Silva | TKO | 2 (10), 1:21 | 13 Feb 2009 | Triumph, Lyubertsy, Russia | |
| 11 | Win | 11–0 | Ayittey Okainjah | RTD | 6 (12), 3:00 | 18 Sep 2008 | Montreal Club, Moscow, Russia | |
| 10 | Win | 10–0 | Mbaruku Kheri | KO | 3 (12), 0:25 | 10 May 2008 | Sport Palace, Barnaul, Russia | |
| 9 | Win | 9–0 | David Gogiya | MD | 8 | 23 Jan 2008 | Sport Palace, Barnaul, Russia | |
| 8 | Win | 8–0 | Kanstantsin Makhankou | UD | 12 | 24 Nov 2007 | Sport Palace, Barnaul, Russia | Retained CISBB super-middleweight title |
| 7 | Win | 7–0 | Yuri Tsarenka | TKO | 7 (10), 2:43 | 31 May 2007 | Palace of Sporting Games, Yekaterinburg, Russia | Retained CISBB super-middleweight title |
| 6 | Win | 6–0 | Vasily Andriyanov | UD | 10 | 24 Mar 2007 | Colosseum, Barnaul, Russia | Retained Russia super-middleweight title |
| 5 | Win | 5–0 | Artem Vychkin | UD | 10 | 2 Dec 2006 | Hippodrome, Nalchik, Russia | Won vacant Russia and CISBB super-middleweight titles |
| 4 | Win | 4–0 | Ruslan Semenov | RTD | 1 (6), 3:00 | 10 Sep 2006 | Sport Palace, Murom, Russia | |
| 3 | Win | 3–0 | Ruslan Semenov | RTD | 4 (6), 3:00 | 1 Jun 2006 | Sport Palace, Barnaul, Russia | |
| 2 | Win | 2–0 | Seifudin Barakhoev | MD | 4 | 9 Apr 2006 | Megapolis Complex, Chelyabinsk, Russia | |
| 1 | Win | 1–0 | Andrey Simonov | TKO | 1 (4) | 1 Dec 2005 | Sport Palace, Barnaul, Russia | |

Sporting positions
Regional boxing titles.
| Vacant Title last held by David Gogiya | Russia super-middleweight champion 2 December 2006 – May 2007; Vacated | Vacant Title next held by Konstantin Piternov |
| Vacant Title last held by David Gogiya | CISBB super-middleweight champion 2 December 2006 – January 2008; Vacated | Vacant Title next held by Fedor Chudinov |
| New title | WBO European light-heavyweight champion 25 September 2009 – 19 December 2009; Failed to win world title | Vacant Title next held by Alejandro Lakatos |
| Vacant Title last held by Daniel Judah | IBF International light-heavyweight champion 27 April 2010 – October 2010; Vacated | Vacant Title next held by Sofiane Sebihi |
| Vacant Title last held by Karo Murat | WBO Inter-Continental light-heavyweight champion 29 October 2010 – July 2012; Vacated | Vacant Title next held by Vyacheslav Uzelkov |
| Vacant Title last held by Aleksy Kuziemski | EBA light-heavyweight champion 29 October 2010 – ? | Defunct sanctioning body |
| Vacant Title last held by Dilmurod Satybaldiev | WBC–CISBB super-middleweight champion 27 November 2015 – June 2017; Vacated | Vacant Title next held by Geard Ajetović |
