= Dawid Kostecki =

Polish boxer (1981–2019)

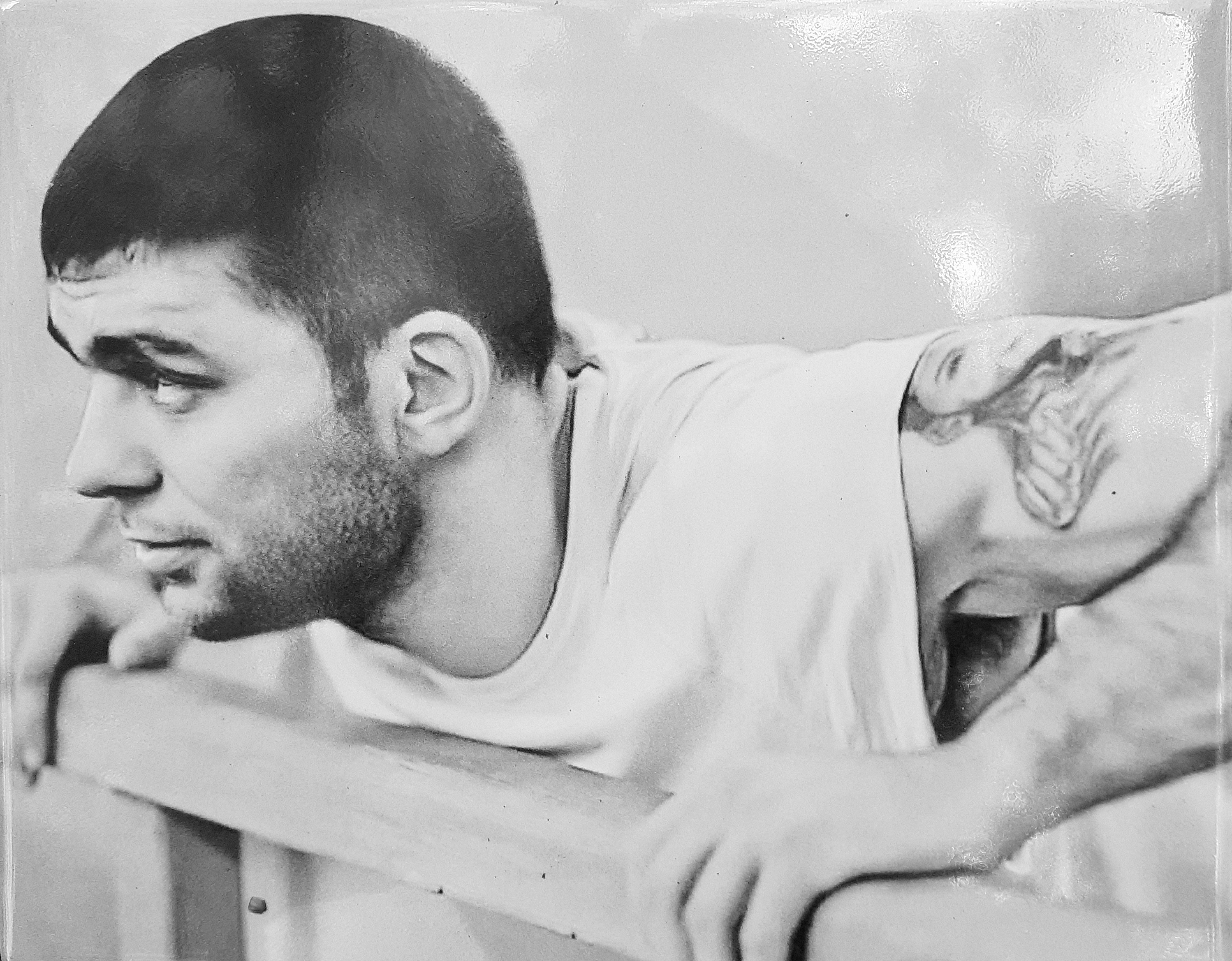

Personal information
- Nickname: Cygan ("Gypsy")
- Nationality: Polish
- Born: 27 June 1981 Rzeszów, Poland
- Died: 2 August 2019 (aged 38) Warsaw, Poland
- Height: 1.83 m (6 ft 0 in)
- Weight: Light-heavyweight

Boxing career
- Stance: Orthodox

Boxing record
- Total fights: 41
- Wins: 39
- Win by KO: 25
- Losses: 2
- Draws: 0

Dawid Kostecki (27 June 1981 – 2 August 2019) was a Polish professional boxer who fought at light heavyweight.

== Boxing titles ==
- WBC Youth Light Heavyweight Title (2004)
- WBF Light Heavyweight Title (2005)
- IBC Light Heavyweight Title (2010)
- (2) WBF Light Heavyweight Title (2010)
- WBC Baltic Light Heavyweight Title (2010)
- WBA Inter-Continental Light Heavyweight Title (2011)

== Scheduled bout against Roy Jones Jr. ==
Dawid Kostecki is best remembered in boxing circles for a scheduled bout which never took place. In a major opportunity bout which could have propelled Kostecki into the worldwide light heavyweight ratings, Roy Jones was supposed to face Kostecki in a 10 round bout at Atlas Arena on 30 June 2012. Days before the fight, Kostecki was convicted of being the ringleader of a criminal organization and was imprisoned. Another Polish boxer, Paweł Głażewski stepped in to fight Jones instead. Jones defeated the 17-0 Głażewski by 10 round split decision. Kostecki missed the biggest chance of his career by not being able to fight the legendary ex-world champion Jones, who had signed for the bout, who showed up in Poland contractually anyway, and who fought a different Polish contender instead.

== Escort business and prison ==
On 31 October 2011, the District Court in Rzeszów sentenced Kostecki to 2.5 years in prison for setting up and co-owning a criminal group. From 2003 to 2007 the group conducted three escort agencies. Investigators also accused him of trafficking in amphetamine, but the court acquitted him of the charge. He lodged an appeal. On 10 May 2012 the Court of Appeal upheld the judgment of 2.5 years imprisonment. On 13 August 2014, he was released from prison early. He was subsequently returned to prison again in Warsaw in 2016 for five years after his fifth conviction, for drug trafficking, car theft, running a prostitution escort ring, and income tax evasion.

== Comeback to ring ==
After emerging from prison in 2014, Kostecki extended his contract by four years with Andrzej Wasilewski, owner of the Poland's Knockout Promotions. Kostecki's comeback attempt ended in failure as he lost an eight round decision to Andrzej Soldra in Krakow Arena in Krakow Poland on 8 November 2014. Kostecki never fought again, finishing with a pro record of 39-2 with 25 knockouts.

== Death ==
Kostecki committed suicide by hanging in a Warsaw prison using bedsheets on 2 August 2019. He was survived by his wife and children.

== Professional record ==
39 Wins (25 knockouts), 2 Loss, 0 Draw
Result	Record	Opponent	Type	Round	Date	Location	Notes
Loss	39-2	(Poland) Andrzej Sołdra	UD	8	2014-11-08	(Poland) Kraków	
Win	39–1	(Georgia (country)) Sandro Siproshvili	UD	6	2012-04-21	(Poland) Zabrze	
Win	38–1	(United States) Byron Mitchell	KO	4 (10)	2011-12-03	(Poland) Warsaw	Retained WBC Baltic and WBA Inter-Continental Light Heavyweight titles
Win	37–1	(Denmark) Lolenga Mock	UD	10	2011-06-25	(Poland) Rzeszów	Won vacant WBA Inter-Continental Light Heavyweight title Retained WBC Baltic Light Heavyweight title
Win	36–1	(Spain) Juan Nelongo	UD	6	2011-03-05	(Poland) Krynica Zdrój	
Win	35–1	(Trinidad and Tobago) Shawn Corbin	TKO	4 (10)	2010-10-23	(Poland) Warsaw	Won vacant WBC Baltic Light Heavyweight title
Win	34–1	(Romania) Giulian Ilie	UD	12	2010-04-24	(Poland) Gdynia	Won vacant WBF Light Heavyweight title
Win	33–1	(Italy) Dario Cichello	TKO	7 (12)	2010-02-06	(Poland) Rzeszów	Won vacant IBC Light Heavyweight title
Win	32–1	(Romania) Istvan Varga	TKO	1 (8)	2009-12-18	(Poland) Łódź	
Win	31–1	(Poland) Grzegorz Soszyński	UD	10	2009-10-24	(Poland) Łódź	
Win	30–1	(France) Martial Bella Oleme	UD	8	2009-02-28	(Poland) Lublin	
Win	29–1	(Kenya) Samson Onyango	TKO	5 (10)	2008-12-13	(Poland) Ketrzyn	
Win	28–1	(Brazil) Marcelo Leandro Da Silva	TKO	1 (8)	2008-09-14	(Poland) Kielce	
Win	27–1	(Georgia (country)) Armen Azizian	UD	8	2008-02-29	(Poland) Lublin	
Win	26–1	(Portugal) Antonio Pedro Quiganga	TKO	2 (10)	2007-12-15	(Poland) Rzeszów	
Win	25–1	(Germany) Bernard Donfack	UD	8	2007-10-13	(Russia) Moscow	
Win	24–1	(Romania) Paul David	KO	1 (8)	2007-09-22	(Poland) Bytom	
Win	23–1	(Algeria) Ramdane Serdjane	DQ	6 (8)	2006-10-28	(Poland) Dębica	
Win	22–1	(Germany) Andreas Günther	KO	2 (6)	2006-07-01	(Poland) Kepno	
Loss	21–1	(France) Rachid Kanfouah	KO	9 (12)	2006-05-06	(Poland) Krosno	For vacant IBC Light Heavyweight title
Win	21–0	(Nigeria) Richard Nwoba	KO	2 (10)	2006-01-21	(Poland) Busko Zdrój	
Win	20–0	(Belgium) Ismail Abdoul	UD	12	2005-10-15	(Poland) Rzeszów	Won vacant WBF Light Heavyweight title
Win	19–0	(Tanzania) Joseph Marwa	TKO	5 (10)	2005-05-21	(Poland) Zdzieszowice	
Win	18–0	(Democratic Republic of the Congo) Mukadi Shambuyi	KO	3 (10)	2005-03-12	(Poland) Poznań	Retained WBC Youth Light Heavyweight title
Win	17–0	(United States) Tucker Lambert	KO	3 (6)	2005-01-21	(United States) Elk Grove	
Win	16–0	(United States) Dhafir Smith	UD	10	2004-12-19	(Poland) Rzeszów	Retained WBC Youth Light Heavyweight title
Win	15–0	(Netherlands) Talal Santiago	PTS	6	2004-11-20	(Poland) Strzelce Opolskie	
Win	14–0	(Tanzania) Gasper Mathew	TKO	5 (10)	2004-09-25	(Poland) Opole	Won vacant WBC Youth Light Heavyweight title
Win	13–0	(Russia) Dmitry Treskov	TKO	6 (6)	2004-06-05	(Poland) Dąbrowa Górnicza	
Win	12–0	(Croatia) Ivica Cukusic	KO	2 (6)	2004-04-24	(Poland) Dąbrowa Górnicza	
Win	11–0	(Kenya) George Adipo Odour	TKO	6 (6)	2004-03-27	(Poland) Radom	
Win	10–0	(Slovakia) Stefan Stanko	KO	1 (4)	2004-03-13	(Germany) Berlin	
Win	9–0	(Czech Republic) Pavel Zima	TKO	3 (6)	2003-12-13	(Poland) Opole	
Win	8–0	(Hungary) Otto Nemeth	TKO	2 (6)	2003-10-24	(Poland) Wrocław	
Win	7–0	(Turkey) Bruce Özbek	PTS	6	2003-09-27	(Poland) Gorzów Wielkopolski	
Win	6–0	(Romania) Florian Benche	PTS	4	2003-06-28	(Poland) Opole	
Win	5–0	(Belarus) Dmitry Adamovich	KO	3 (4)	2002-05-24	(Poland) Płońsk	
Win	4–0	(Hungary) Sandor Szakaly	TKO	1 (6)	2002-04-13	(Poland) Bielsko Biała	
Win	3–0	(Poland) Piotr Ścieszka	TKO	2 (4)	2002-02-23	(Poland) Włocławek	
Win	2–0	unknown	KO	2 (4)	2001-12-29	(Poland) Konin	
Win	1–0	(Poland) Marcin Najman	TKO	4 (4)	2001-11-24	(Poland) Łódź	Kostecki's professional debut.
