= Roberto Bolonti =

Argentine boxer

Personal information
- Nicknames: La Bestia, sicuta
- Born: Roberto Feliciano Bolonti; December 30, 1978 (age 47) General Piran Buenos Aires, Argentina
- Height: 5 ft 11 in (1.80 m)
- Weight: Light Heavyweight

Boxing career
- Stance: Orthodox

Boxing record
- Total fights: 46
- Wins: 39
- Win by KO: 26
- Losses: 6
- No contests: 1

Roberto Feliciano Bolonti (born March 2, 1984) is an Argentine professional boxer.

== Professional career ==
On 17 November 2012, Bolonti was beat by Tony Bellew for the WBC silver title. Bellew was cut badly but went the full 12 rounds to a win unanimous decision.

June 7, 2014 on a fight for the WBA light heavyweight title, Bolonti lost in a Unanimous Decision against Juergen Braehmer.

December 6, 2014 his fight against Jean Pascal ended in no contest after Canadian's unintentional foul.

On 19 August 2015, Roberto will face Danny Green on his comeback after almost 3 years outside the ring.

== Professional boxing record ==
39 wins (26 knockouts), 6 losses, 0 draws
Res.	Record	Opponent	Type	Rd., Time	Date	Location	Notes
Win	39-6	(Argentina) Dario Balmaceda	SD	12 (12)	2017-02-11	Club Once Unidos, Mar del Plata, Buenos Aires, Argentina	
Win	38-6	(Argentina) Dario Balmaceda	UD	8 (8)	2016-11-12	Polideportivo Pte Perón, Coronel Vidal, Buenos Aires, Argentina	
Loss	37-6	(South Africa) Kevin Lerena	UD	10 (10)	2016-06-11	Emperors Palace, Kempton Park, South Africa	
Win	37-5	(Argentina) Walter David Cabral	KO	6 (8)	2016-01-29	Club Social y Deportivo Santa Clara, Buenos Aires, Argentina	
Loss	36-5	(France) Youri Kayembre Kalenga	KO	9 (10)	2015-11-07	Salle des Étoiles, Monte Carlo, Monaco	
Loss	36-4	(Australia) Danny Green	UD	12	2015-08-19	Hisense Arena, Melbourne, Australia	
Win	36-3	(Venezuela) Williams Ocando	TKO	2 (10)	2015-07-25	GAP Disco, Mar del Plata, Buenos Aires, Argentina	Won vacant WBC Latino light heavyweight title
NC	35-3	(Canada) Jean Pascal	NC	2 (10)	2014-12-06	Bell Centre, Montreal, Canada	
Loss	35-3	(Germany) Juergen Braehmer	UD	12 (12)	2014-06-07	Sport and Congress Center, Schwerin, Germany	For WBA light heavyweight title
Win	35-2	(Argentina) José Alberto Clavero	KO	6 (10)	2014-01-24	Polideportivo Municipal, Pinamar, Buenos Aires, Argentina	Retain WBC Latino light heavyweight title.
Win	34-2	(Colombia) Manuel Banquez	KO	5 (10)	2013-11-15	GAP Disco, Mar del Plata, Buenos Aires, Argentina	Retain WBC Latino light heavyweight title.
Win	33-2	(Chile) Rodrigo Chavez	KO	4 (8)	2013-09-13	GAP Disco, Mar del Plata, Buenos Aires, Argentina	
Win	32-2	(Uruguay) Jorge Rodriguez Olivera	KO	3 (10)	2013-03-06	Club Social y Deportivo Santa Clara, Buenos Aires, Argentina	Retain WBC Latino light heavyweight title.
Win	31-2	(Argentina) Franco Raul Sanchez	RTD	8 (10)	2013-01-19	Club Social y Deportivo, Santa Clara, Buenos Aires, Argentina	Retain WBC Latino light heavyweight title.
Loss	30-2	(United Kingdom) Tony Bellew	UD	12 (12)	2011-04-02	(United Kingdom) Capital FM Arena, Nottingham	For vacant WBC Silver light heavyweight title
Win	30-1	(Argentina) José Alberto Clavero	KO	8 (12)	2012-09-22	Estadio Luna Park, Buenos Aires, Argentina	
Win	29-1	(Colombia) Evert Bravo	TKO	3 (10)	2012-05-12	Club América, General Pirán, Buenos Aires, Argentina	
Win	28-1	(Argentina) Jose Emilio Mazurier	KO	6 (10)	2011-12-10	General Piran, Buenos Aires, Argentina	
Win	27-1	(Brazil) Jose Hilton Dos Santos	TKO	4 (10)	2011-10-14	Estadio Luna Park, Buenos Aires, Argentina	Retain WBC Latino light heavyweight title.
Win	26-1	(Argentina) Jose Emilio Mazurier	TKO	6 (10)	2011-08-20	Ce.De.M. N° 1, Caseros, Buenos Aires, Argentina	
Win	25-1	(Argentina) Martin David Islas	UD	10 (10)	2011-05-01	Club América, General Pirán, Buenos Aires, Argentina	
Win	24-1	(Argentina) Martin David Islas	UD	8 (8)	2011-03-26	Polideportivo Gabriel Atilio, Buenos Aires, Argentina	
Win	23-1	(Argentina) Martin David Islas	TKO	2 (6)	2010-12-18	Club Once Unidos, Mar del Plata, Buenos Aires, Argentina	
Win	22-1	(Argentina) Pablo Daniel Zamora Nievas	KO	3 (10)	2010-09-11	Estadio Pedro Estremador, San Carlos de Bariloche, Rio Negro, Argentina	
