= Antonio Brancalion =

Italian boxer

Personal information
- Nationality: Italian
- Born: 5 February 1976 (age 50) Rovigo, Veneto, Italy
- Height: 1.85 m (6 ft 1 in)
- Weight: Super-middleweight; Light-heavyweight

Boxing career
- Reach: 183 cm (72 in)
- Stance: Orthodox

Boxing record
- Total fights: 42
- Wins: 32
- Win by KO: 8
- Losses: 8
- Draws: 2

Antonio Brancalion (born 5 February 1976) is an Italian former professional boxer who competed from 1996 to 2010. He held the European Union light-heavyweight title from 2007 to 2009, and challenged three times for the European light-heavyweight title. Dal 2022 è rinchiuso in carcere, prima a Rovigo, poi a Padova, per una lunga serie di reati commessi contro il patrimonio e contro le persone, usando violenza in particolare contro le donne, verso le quali commetteva atti persecutori violenti

== Professional career ==
Brancalion made his professional debut on 20 December 1996, winning a six-round points decision over Stefan Magyar. His first three losses were all against Vincenzo Imparato, with the Italy super-middleweight title at stake each time. On 29 October 2004, Brancalion won his first regional championship—the vacant IBF International light-heavyweight title—by stopping Gabor Halasz in six rounds. Brancalion made his first of three attempts at winning the European light-heavyweight title on 7 January 2006, losing a wide unanimous decision to Stipe Drews. A year later, on 24 March 2007, Brancalion won the vacant European Union light-heavyweight title by majority decision over Kai Kurzawa. Two defences were made, against Tomas Adamek on 28 June 2007 (via split decision) and Dario Cichello on 2 December 2008 (via unanimous decision).

On 6 June 2009, Brancalion tried for a second time to win the European light-heavyweight title, but was stopped in one round by defending champion Jürgen Brähmer. Brancalion's third attempt at the now-vacant title came against Nathan Cleverly on 13 February 2010.

he is currently incarcerated in the Rovigo prison for a sum of sentences

== Professional boxing record ==
42 fights	32 wins	8 losses
By knockout	8	2
By decision	22	6
By disqualification	2	0
Draws	2	

No.	Result	Record	Opponent	Type	Round, time	Date	Location	Notes
42	Loss	32–8–2	Nathan Cleverly	TKO	5 (12), 1:15	13 Feb 2010	Wembley Arena, London, England	For vacant European light-heavyweight title
41	Loss	32–7–2	Jürgen Brähmer	TKO	1 (12), 1:23	6 Jun 2009	König-Pilsener-Arena, Oberhausen, Germany	For European light-heavyweight title
40	Win	32–6–2	Dario Cichello	UD	12	2 Dec 2008	Palazzetto dello Sport, Pisa, Italy	Retained European Union light-heavyweight title
39	Win	31–6–2	Mihaly Kratki	TKO	3 (6)	7 Nov 2008	Palasport, Piove di Sacco, Italy	
38	Win	30–6–2	David Greter	UD	8	29 Mar 2008	Palasport Comunale Villa Romiti, Forlì, Italy	
37	Win	29–6–2	Mihaly Kratki	PTS	6	16 Nov 2007	Palazzetto dello Sport, Pisa, Italy	
36	Win	28–6–2	Tomas Adamek	SD	12	28 Jun 2007	Sportovní hala, Chomutov, Czech Republic	Retained European Union light-heavyweight title
35	Win	27–6–2	Kai Kurzawa	MD	12	24 Mar 2007	Alsterdorfer Sporthalle, Hamburg, Germany	Won vacant European Union light-heavyweight title
34	Win	26–6–2	Roman Vanicky	PTS	6	14 Nov 2006	Palasport Comunale Villa Romiti, Forlì, Italy	
33	Loss	25–6–2	Stipe Drews	UD	12	7 Jan 2006	Zenith, Munich, Germany	For WBO Inter-Continental and vacant European light-heavyweight titles
32	Win	25–5–2	Dmitry Adamovich	PTS	6	1 Jul 2005	Palermo, Italy	
31	Win	24–5–2	Djamel Selini	UD	12	13 May 2005	Palazzetto dello Sport, Piacenza, Italy	Retained IBF International light-heavyweight title
30	Win	23–5–2	Massimiliano Saiani	UD	10	18 Feb 2005	Rovigo, Italy	Won vacant Italy light-heavyweight title
29	Win	22–5–2	Christopher Robert	PTS	6	18 Dec 2004	Palazzetto dello Sport, Rezzato, Italy	
28	Win	21–5–2	Gabor Halasz	TKO	6 (12)	29 Oct 2004	Ariano nel Polesine, Italy	Won vacant IBF International light-heavyweight title
27	Win	20–5–2	Danny de Beul	PTS	6	12 Mar 2004	Camisano Vicentino, Italy	
26	Win	19–5–2	Christopher Robert	PTS	6	6 Feb 2004	Ariano nel Polesine, Italy	
25	Draw	18–5–1	Marco Urbinati	PTS	6	19 Oct 2003	Rubiera, Italy	
24	Draw	18–5–1	Fabio Minelli	PTS	6	10 Aug 2003	Discoteca Rio, Serramazzoni, Italy	
23	Loss	18–5	Mario Veit	UD	8	12 Jul 2003	Wilhelm-Dopatka-Halle, Leverkusen, Germany	
22	Loss	18–4	Massimiliano Saiani	PTS	6	26 Dec 2002	Castel Mella, Italy	
21	Loss	18–3	Vincenzo Imparato	MD	10	12 Apr 2002	Ariano nel Polesine, Italy	Lost Italy super-middleweight title
20	Win	18–2	Alessandro Filippo	TKO	5 (10)	2 Nov 2001	Rovigo, Italy	Won vacant Italy super-middleweight title
19	Win	17–2	Alessandro Filippo	DQ	5 (8)	11 May 2001	Traversetolo, Italy	
18	Win	16–2	Maurizio Colombo	PTS	6	30 Mar 2001	San Donà di Piave, Italy	
17	Win	15–2	Ivica Cukusic	PTS	8	30 Dec 2000	Quartu Sant'Elena, Italy	
16	Win	14–2	Ivica Cukusic	PTS	6	16 Dec 2000	Guidonia Montecelio, Italy	
15	Loss	13–2	Vincenzo Imparato	TD	8 (10)	17 Nov 2000	Lumezzane, Italy	For Italy super-middleweight title; Unanimous TD after Brancalion was cut from an accidental head clash
14	Win	13–1	Eliseo Nogueira	PTS	6	28 Jul 2000	Rovigo, Italy	
13	Loss	12–1	Vincenzo Imparato	PTS	10	5 May 2000	Rosolina, Italy	For Italy super-middleweight title
12	Win	12–0	Domenico Alfano	PTS	6	22 Oct 1999	Brembate di Sopra, Italy	
11	Win	11–0	Tibor Horvath	TKO	4	8 Jul 1999	Rovigo, Italy	
10	Win	10–0	Massimiliano Moncini	DQ	2	13 May 1999	Padua, Italy	
9	Win	9–0	Jorge Ortiz	PTS	6	14 Apr 1999	Lonato del Garda, Italy	
8	Win	8–0	Jorge Ortiz	PTS	6	27 Feb 1999	Rovigo, Italy	
7	Win	7–0	Stefan Dimitrov	TKO	3	21 Nov 1998	Langhirano, Italy	
6	Win	6–0	Francesco Fiorentino	PTS	6	26 Dec 1997	San Donà di Piave, Italy	
5	Win	5–0	Constantin Timofte	TKO	3	28 Nov 1997	San Donà di Piave, Italy	
4	Win	4–0	Lajos Patko	PTS	6	23 May 1997	San Donà di Piave, Italy	
3	Win	3–0	Ferenc Olah	TKO	6	21 Mar 1997	San Donà di Piave, Italy	
2	Win	2–0	Richard Raffesberger	KO	2 (6)	7 Feb 1997	San Donà di Piave, Italy	
1	Win	1–0	Stefan Magyar	PTS	6	20 Dec 1996	San Donà di Piave, Italy	Professional debut

Sporting positions
Regional boxing titles
Preceded by Alessandro Filippo	Italy super-middleweight champion 2 November 2001 – 12 April 2002	Succeeded by Vincenzo Imparato
Vacant Title last held by Alexey Trofimov	IBF International light-heavyweight champion 29 October 2004 – January 2006; Vacated	Vacant Title next held by Daniel Judah
Vacant Title last held by Massimiliano Saiani	Italy light-heavyweight champion 18 February 2005 – December 2005; Vacated	Vacant Title next held by Leonardo Turchi
Vacant Title last held by Jean-Louis Mandengue	European Union light-heavyweight champion 24 March 2007 – 6 June 2009; Lost bid for European title	Vacant Title next held by Nadjib Mohammedi
