= Danny McIntosh =

English professional boxer (born 1980)

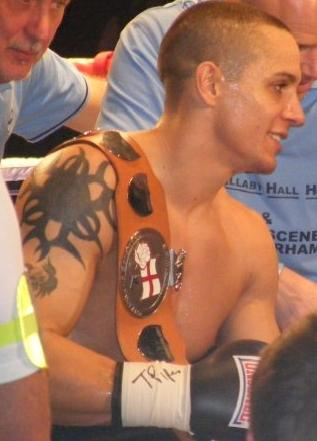

Personal information
- Nicknames: The Big Mac; The Mac Man
- Nationality: British
- Born: Daniel McIntosh; 1 March 1980 (age 46) Norwich, Norfolk, England
- Height: 6 ft 2 in (188 cm)
- Weight: Light-heavyweight

Boxing career
- Stance: Orthodox

Boxing record
- Total fights: 20
- Wins: 14
- Win by KO: 7
- Losses: 6

Danny McIntosh (born 1 March 1980) is a British former professional boxer who competed from 2005 to 2014. He held the European light-heavyweight title in 2011 and competed in the 30th Prizefighter series.

== Professional career ==
McIntosh's first professional fight took place in April 2005 at the Sports Village in Norwich and resulted in a six-round points victory over Omid Bourzo. He fought twice more in 2005 winning on both occasions leaving him with a record of 3–0 at the end of his first year. McIntosh then had a full year away from the ring before returning in October 2006 with a win over the then unbeaten Matty Hough (5–0) in Walsall. Only two fights followed in 2007 with victories over experienced journeyman Rob Burton and a career best performance ending the unbeaten record of Joey Vegas (then 10–0). One more victory in February 2008 enhanced his record to 7-0 and set him up for a shot at the English light heavyweight title.

=== English Champion ===
Danny's first professional title win came on the undercard of Jonathon Thaxton's European title victory over Juan Diaz Melero at the Norwich Showground on 4 October 2008. The experienced Steve Spartacus represented a step up for McIntosh but he won in the 7th round to claim the title. McIntosh has since made two defences of the belt beating Nottingham's Rod Anderton on 6 December 2008 and Southampton's Matthew Barney on 28 March 2009.

On 18 July 2009 McIntosh challenged Commonwealth champion Nathan Cleverly for the vacant British title in what was only his 11th fight as a professional. He was defeated for the first time when, having been knocked down on four occasions, the fight was stopped in the 7th round. Following the fight McIntosh said he would learn from the "nightmare", saying that Cleverly had taught him a boxing lesson. His next fight on 19 February 2010 saw him put that night behind him with a third successful defence of his English title. The fight, on the undercard of a Ricky Hatton promoted bill, saw him retain the title with a 2nd round stoppage over former British champion Tony Oakey. McIntosh stepped up to cruiserweight in his next fight at the Castle Leisure Center in Bury on 6 November 2010 beating journeyman Hastings Rasani in the 3rd round of what was a non-title contest.

=== European Title challenge ===
On 22 January 2011 McIntosh traveled to France to challenge Thierry Karl for the vacant European title. Despite being behind on points, McIntosh was able to take control of the fight in the 11th round prompting the referee to stop the fight and hand the title to McIntosh. The first defence of the title was, however, to end in defeat when on 7 May 2011 McIntosh traveling to Germany to defend against local boxer Eduard Gutknecht, losing in the 8th round.

== Professional boxing record ==
20 fights	14 wins	6 losses
By knockout	7	5
By decision	6	1
By disqualification	1	0

No.	Result	Record	Opponent	Type	Round, time	Date	Location	Notes
20	Loss	14–6	Travis Dickinson	TKO	3 (10), 1:16	22 Mar 2014	Ponds Forge Arena, Sheffield, England	For vacant English light-heavyweight title
19	Loss	14–5	Hari Miles	UD	3	18 May 2013	York Hall, London, England	Prizefighter 30: cruiserweight semi-final
18	Win	14–4	Neil Dawson	UD	3	18 May 2013	York Hall, London, England	Prizefighter 30: cruiserweight quarter-final
17	Loss	13–4	Eleider Álvarez	KO	8 (10), 2:02	14 Dec 2012	Bell Centre, Montreal, Quebec, Canada	For WBO–NABO light-heavyweight title
16	Loss	13–3	Tony Bellew	TKO	5 (12), 0:38	27 Apr 2012	Echo Arena, Liverpool, England	For British light-heavyweight title
15	Loss	13–2	Eduard Gutknecht	TKO	8 (12), 1:28	7 May 2011	Jahnsportforum, Neubrandenburg, Germany	Lost European light-heavyweight title
14	Win	13–1	Thierry Karl	TKO	11 (12), 1:24	22 Jan 2011	Palais des sports Marcel-Cerdan, Levallois-Perret, France	Won vacant European light-heavyweight title
13	Win	12–1	Hastings Rasani	TKO	3 (6), 0:55	6 Nov 2010	Castle Leisure Centre, Bury, England	
12	Win	11–1	Tony Oakey	TKO	2 (12), 2:22	19 Feb 2010	Fenton Manor Sports Complex, Stoke-on-Trent, England	Retained English light-heavyweight title
11	Loss	10–1	Nathan Cleverly	TKO	7 (12), 1:30	18 Jul 2009	York Hall, London, England	For Commonwealth and vacant British light-heavyweight titles
10	Win	10–0	Matthew Barney	DQ	5 (10), 2:46	28 Feb 2009	Norwich Showground, Norwich, England	Retained English light-heavyweight title; Barney disqualified for repeated holding
9	Win	9–0	Rod Anderton	TKO	1 (10), 1:17	6 Dec 2008	Trent FM Arena, Nottingham, England	Retained English light-heavyweight title
8	Win	8–0	Steve Spartacus	TKO	7 (10), 1:35	4 Oct 2008	Norwich Showground, Norwich, England	Won vacant English light-heavyweight title
7	Win	7–0	Nick Okoth	TKO	3 (4), 2:10	22 Feb 2008	York Hall, London, England	
6	Win	6–0	Joey Vegas	PTS	6	4 Oct 2007	Hotel Café Royal, London, England	
5	Win	5–0	Rob Burton	PTS	4	16 Mar 2007	Norwich Showground, Norwich, England	
4	Win	4–0	Matty Hough	TKO	6 (6), 0:26	7 Oct 2006	Town Hall, Walsall, England	
3	Win	3–0	Michael Banbula	PTS	6	6 Oct 2005	Thistle Heathrow Hotel, London, England	
2	Win	2–0	Howard Clarke	PTS	4	3 Sep 2005	Carrow Road, Norwich, England	
1	Win	1–0	Omid Bourzo	PTS	6	9 Apr 2005	Sports Village, Norwich, England	

Sporting positions
Regional boxing titles
Vacant Title last held by Peter Haymer	English light-heavyweight champion October 4, 2008 – November 2010; Vacated	Vacant Title next held by Bob Ajisafe
Vacant Title last held by Nathan Cleverly	European light-heavyweight champion January 22, 2011 – May 7, 2011	Succeeded by Eduard Gutknecht
