= Nathan Cleverly =

Welsh boxer (born 1987)

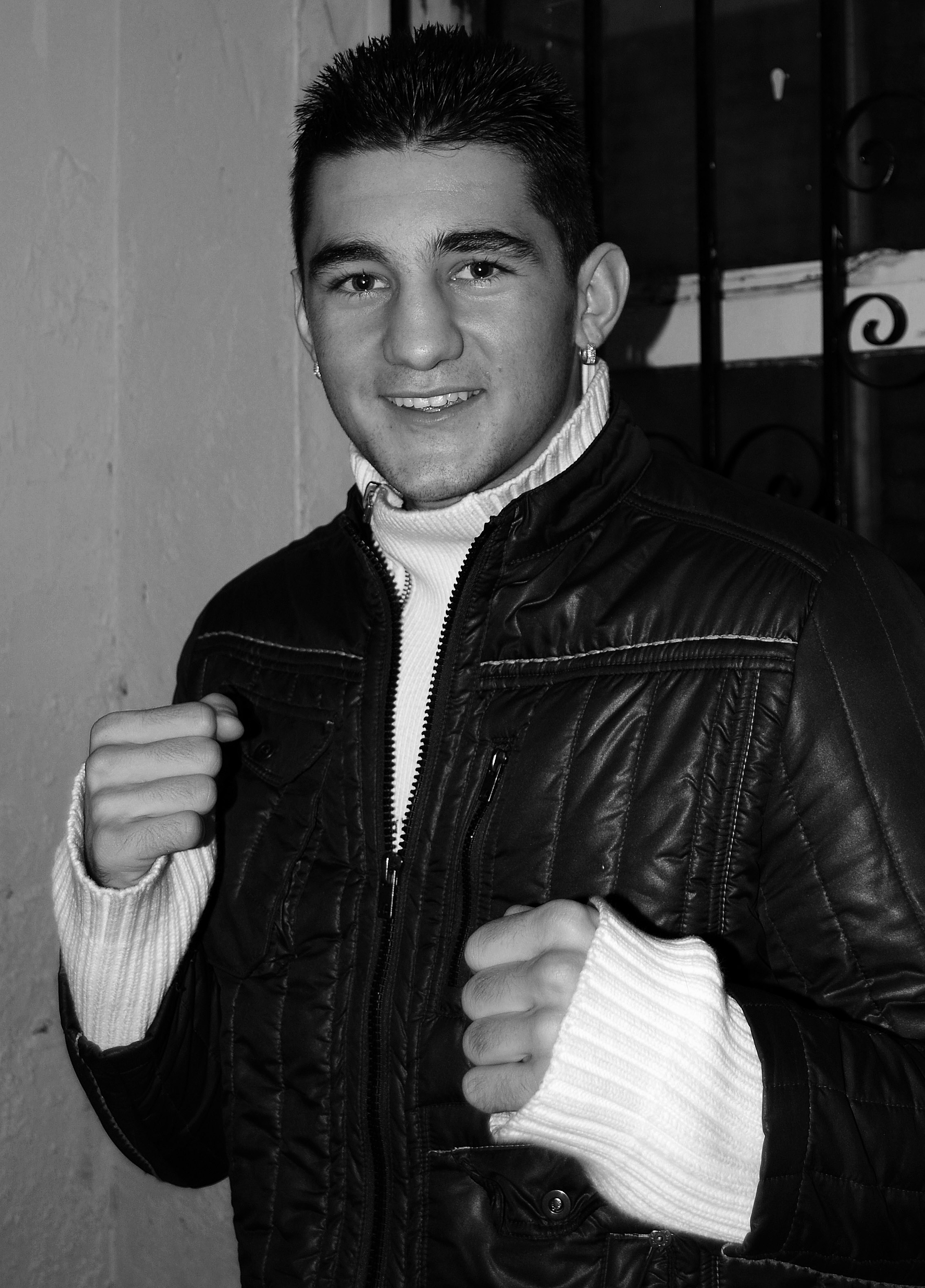
- Cleverly in 2007

Personal information
- Nationality: Welsh
- Born: 17 February 1987 (age 39) Caerphilly, Wales
- Height: 6 ft 2 in (188 cm)
- Weight: Light-heavyweight; Cruiserweight

Boxing career
- Reach: 76 in (193 cm)
- Stance: Orthodox

Boxing record
- Total fights: 34
- Wins: 30
- Win by KO: 16
- Losses: 4

Nathan Cleverly (born 17 February 1987) is a Welsh former professional boxer who competed from 2005 to 2017. He is a two-time light-heavyweight world champion, having held the WBO title from 2011 to 2013, and the WBA (Regular) title from 2016 to 2017. At regional level, he held multiple light-heavyweight championships, including the European, British, and Commonwealth titles between 2008 and 2010.

Cleverly graduated with a BSc in mathematics from Cardiff University in 2010.

== Professional career ==
=== Light heavyweight ===
==== Early career ====
Cleverly made his professional debut in July 2005 with a four-round victory over journeyman Ernie Smith at the Meadowbank Sports Center in Edinburgh and within a year had compiled a winning ledger of 6–0. His first fight of substance however was in October 2006 when he met Liverpool's Tony Quigley at the MEN Arena in Manchester. The fight which was on the undercard to the match up between Joe Calzaghe and Sakio Bika ended in a 5th round stoppage for Cleverly and handed Quigley his first pro defeat.

The next big test for the young prospect took place at the Millennium Stadium in Cardiff just over a year later in September 2007 when Cleverly met tough Ugandan Joey Vegas. Cleverly at that time boasted a record of 10–0 and Vegas 10–1. The fight ended with a gruelling points win over 8 rounds for the Welshman in what was his toughest fight to date. Speaking about the result to the BBC and referring to the sparring he received in the Enzo Calzaghe gym, Cleverly said "I'm still young and won't be hitting my peak for about eight years, but think how good the wars I'm having in the gym now are doing me for the future ... I want to keep on progressing, to go for the British title, then maybe a world crown in a couple of years."

Cleverly had made a point of fighting on the undercards of his stablemate Joe Calzaghe with the Vegas fight being one of the prelims to Calzaghe's World title unification fight against Mikkel Kessler. The next stop however was the real Vegas, Las Vegas to support Calzaghe's attempt to win The Ring's Light heavyweight belt against American fighter Bernard Hopkins. Cleverly, fighting outside the UK for the first time as a pro also faced American opposition and beat Antonio Baker over 8 rounds.

In September 2008, the young boxer chose to leave Enzo Calzaghe's Newbridge boxing club where he had trained throughout his career and begin training at his father's gym in South Wales. Speaking about his decision to leave the gym Cleverly said "I have been trained by Enzo Calzaghe for six years since my youth days so leaving him has been one of the hardest decision I've ever had to make ... Enzo is largely responsible for where I am in my career and I cannot thank him enough for what he has done for me." Cleverly had been concerned following the legal wranglings between promoter Frank Warren and his former stablemate Joe Calzaghe and added "I cannot take any chances with my career ... I take boxing very seriously and want to be world champion. Hopefully Frank can sort that out for me."

==== Commonwealth and British champion ====
"I have worked hard for this but this is just the start for me – I want to rule the world"

— Nathan Cleverly, speaking after winning the commonwealth title

In October 2008, Cleverly landed a shot at the vacant Commonwealth light heavyweight title topping the bill for the first time in his career at the Everton Park Sports Centre in Liverpool. His opponent was the experienced former British champion Tony Oakey who he beat on points over 12 rounds. Speaking after picking up his first belt Cleverly said "What a memorable night for me, winning a title is something I have dreamed of since I was a kid ... I have worked hard for this but this is just the start for me – I want to rule the world."

Cleverly defended his title just two months later in December against Kenyan Douglas Otieno. The African fighter, who came into the contest with a record of 18–1, was no match for the Welshman and was stopped in the 4th round. In February 2009 he defended for the second time against another Kenyan, Samson Onyang winning via knockout in the 1st round. On 22 May 2009 he scored a second round stoppage over Billy Boyle for his third defence of the title.

The victory over Boyle set Cleverly up for a shot at the vacant British title on 18 July 2009 against English champion Danny McIntosh. Fighting at the York Hall Cleverly knocked McIntosh down on four occasions before the referee stepped in to stop the fight in the 7th round ensuring that Cleverly could add the Lonsdale Belt to his Commonwealth. Following the victory Cleverly laid claim to being the best light heavyweight in Britain, despite the fact that fellow Brit Clinton Woods was soon to be travelling to Florida in a challenge for the vacant IBF World title against Tavoris Cloud. Cleverly saying that whenever the fight between himself and Woods could be made, he would be ready for it. Former champion Woods would go on to lose the fight and promptly announced his retirement from boxing. On 25 September 2009 Cleverly was pipped to the prestigious Boxing Writers Club young boxer of the year award by only one vote losing out to British welterweight champion Kell Brook in what was the closest vote in the history of the award.

On 9 October 2009 Cleverly defended both belts for the very first time against former Commonwealth Games gold medallist Courtney Fry. The fight, at the York Hall, resulted in an 8th round stoppage for Cleverly against a man who had been a successful amateur. Even more crucial for the Welshman was the news that prior to the fight he had been nominated to fight for the European title and that any loss to Fry would have scuppered those plans.

==== European champion ====
"As well as crunching numbers, I've had to fight for the British, Commonwealth and European titles as well, and spend most evenings hitting the heavy bag and doing numerous press ups and sit ups"

— Nathan Cleverly, on studying for a Maths degree whilst being a professional boxer

On 13 February 2010 Cleverly took on Antonio Brancalion at Wembley Arena in a bid to gain the vacant European light-heavyweight title. The fight was won in the fifth round, the victory coming by way of knock out after two earlier knock downs in the previous round. In winning he became only the seventh Welshman to hold the British, Commonwealth and European titles. In addition to winning titles, Cleverly had during the same time period been studying for a Maths degree at Cardiff University eventually gaining a 2:2 degree. Speaking after securing his degree in May 2010 he claimed the studying and the boxing combined had taken its toll saying "All the other students in my year have been able to concentrate full-time on getting their degrees ... But as well as crunching numbers, I've had to fight for the British, Commonwealth and European titles as well, and spend most evenings hitting the heavy bag and doing numerous press ups and sit ups."

==== Cleverly vs. Murat ====
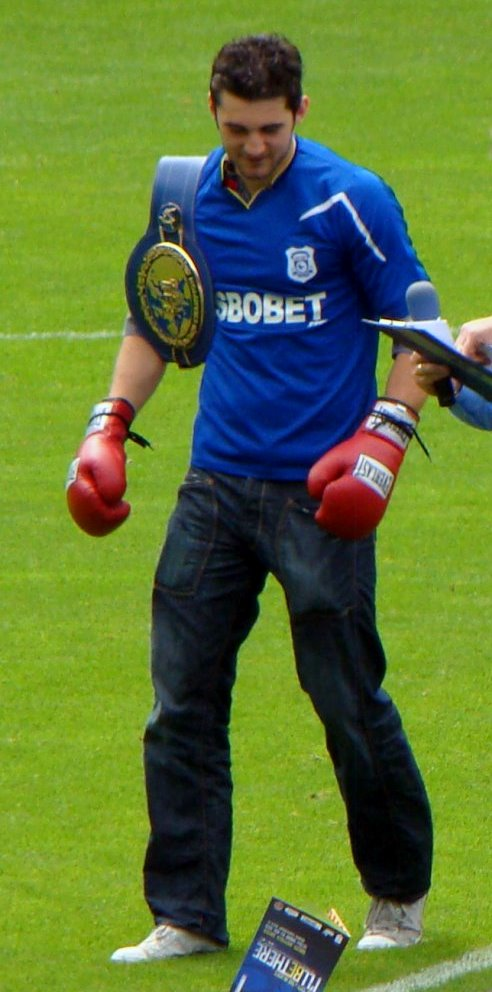
Cleverly at the Cardiff City Stadium in Wales in August 2010.

On 18 September 2010 Cleverly faced the unbeaten Karo Murat at the LG Arena in Birmingham in an eliminator for the WBO light heavyweight title. Cleverly moved one step closer to a match up with reigning champion Jürgen Brähmer with a ninth-round TKO to win the fight which was one of the main events on Frank Warren's 'Magnificent Seven' event. Murat, a former European champion at super middleweight, struggled to match the Welshman after an explosive start and after being rocked in the 9th, the referee decided to stop the fight prior to the commencement of the 10th.

==== Cleverly vs. Mohammedi ====
Cleverly earned the interim version of the belt on 11 December 2010 in an unimpressive contest with the Frenchman Nadjib Mohammedi at the Echo Arena in Liverpool. Winning 115–112, 116–111 and 115–113 on the scorecards despite also having a point deducted Cleverly described his opponent as "very awkward" and said "he was making me miss and dragging me in but this is the way it goes sometimes." Cleverly had fought for the interim title as the full champion Jürgen Brähmer was in the midst of an appeal against a 16-month jail sentence for assault and insulting behaviour. An appeal heard in Germany on 13 December 2010 would, if Brähmer had been unsuccessful and sent to prison, have resulted in the belt being vacated and Cleverly being upgraded to the full champion status. Proceedings however didn't result in the champion being sent to prison and a fight with Brähmer was scheduled for 21 May 2011 Speaking of the match up Cleverly said that he was glad that it was going to happen saying "He's the champion and the only way I would consider myself a true champion is if I took the belt from him, rather than picking up the vacant title."

==== Cleverly vs. Kuziemski ====
Prior to the fight at The O2 Arena in London, Brähmer pulled out citing an eye injury received in training which had failed to heal properly. The pullout resulted in the loss of the main event for the show and speculation that Cleverly would be awarded the full WBO title by default. Brähmer's replacement was found in undefeated British fighter Tony Bellew, then the Commonwealth champion.

Bellew, however, failed to make the weight and a second replacement was found in Polish veteran Aleksy Kuziemski, a man ranked at number 11 in the world by the WBO. Despite the disruption, Cleverly, who had been awarded the full title following Brähmers pullout, made a successful first defence to retain the title. The fight ended in the fourth round after a cut to the Kuziemski was deemed bad enough for the referee to stop the fight. Speaking of his achievement Cleverly said "I felt it was my destiny tonight ... Ever since I first put the gloves on when I was 11 this was the night I've been dreaming of ... Now I'll say Nathan Cleverly is the light-heavyweight champion of the world".

==== Cleverly vs. Bellew ====
Cleverly made his first defence of his WBO title on 15 October 2011 with a hard-fought majority points decision against Tony Bellew in Liverpool. The fight, at the Echo Arena, was considered to be one of Cleverly's "hardest days in the office" with one judge scoring the contest a draw. The fight had an ill-tempered build up with the two clashing during the weigh in resulting in a hostile reception for the champion against the home challenger.

==== Cleverly vs. Karpency ====
Warren announced on 3 January 3, 2012, that Cleverly would return to Wales to make a defence of his WBO title against 25 year old American contender Tommy Karpency (21–2–1, 14 KOs). The fight was scheduled to take place on 25 February at the Motorpoint Arena in Cardiff. It was regarded an odd title defence as Karpency wasn't ranked in the top 15 with the WBO. Warren initially offered unification fights to Beibut Shumenov and Bernard Hopkins. Although Shumenov wanted the fight, he claimed he was not ready. Hopkins had a rematch already set with Chad Dawson. In front of 5,000 strong, the fight went the full 12 round distance as Cleverly won every round on all three judges scorecards comfortably (120–108), to retain his world title.Cleverly showed he clearly had the better workrate and technique, winning every round dominantly. Karpency was not a threat as many thought, but showed durability in lasting the distance, having previously not been stopped. This was the first time in 12 fights that Cleverly fought in Cardiff. According to puch stats, Cleverly landed 374 of his 987 punches (38%), while Karpency landed only 87 in 692 thrown (13%), showing very little workrate.

==== Cleverly vs. Hawk ====
On 5 November 2012, Cleverly traveled to the United States to make a third title defence against American boxer Shawn Hawk (23–2–1, 17 KOs) at the Staples Center in Los Angeles. The fight took place on 10 November. Prior to the fight, Hawk had never been stopped as a professional and was a former sparring partner of Cleverly. Cleverly was originally scheduled to defend his title against Ryan Coyne, but the fight was called off due to contract disputes involving infamous promoter Don King. Hawk was unranked by the WBO, however, they sanctioned the bout, only if Cleverly would fight a mandatory challenger next. Cleverly retained the WBO title with an 8th round stoppage against Hawk. Prior to the stoppage, Hawk was dropped twice in round 7. Cleverly used his hand speed and worked Hawk down to the body shots, but carelessly took some shots himself. As referee Tony Crebs stepped in to halt the fight, Hawk's corner also threw in the towel, to avoid their man receiving any more punishment. Cleverly spoke to BBC Wales after the fight, "This proves I'm ready for the States, I just hope their best fighters are ready to fight me," Cleverly was next.

==== Cleverly vs. Krasniqi ====
On 20 December 2012, it was announced that Cleverly world make a defence of his WBO title against mandatory challenger Robin Krasniqi (39–2, 15 KOs) on 16 March 2013. Cleverly's promoter, Frank Warren, won the purse bid. The WBO threatened Cleverly, who was hoping to pursue a unification fight against WBA champion Beibut Shumenov, if he didn't fight Krasniqi next. Cleverly said, "If it all goes well with the Krasniqi fight, Shumenov is definitely in my sights and I would definitely like to fight the winner of Hopkins and Tavoris Cloud." Although Cleverly wanted the fight to take place in Cardiff, he was open to the idea of fighting in Germany. Krasniqi, who lost two of his first three professional fight, had not lost in seven years, winning 38 consecutive fights.

In what was supposed to be Cleverly's toughest fight to date, he out skilled and out pointed Krasniqi winning by unanimous decision at the Wembley Arena on 20 April 2013. The judges gave Cleverly every round (120–108) whilst one judge credited Krasniqi with some even rounds, scoring it (119–111). Cleverly set the pace of the fight throughout behind his jab and when he saw the chance, landed a flurry of punches. In the post-fight, Cleverly spoke of his game plan going into the fight, I thought sooner or later he was going to have to go but he was very tough. Plan A was to box and Plan B was to get inside. He was hurt a lot but he wasn't quite ready to go, so in the end I had to revert to Plan A." With the win, Cleverly stayed on course for a unification fight against Bernard Hopkins.

==== Cleverly vs. Kovalev ====
Cleverly made his fifth defence of the title against undefeated Russian Sergey Kovalev (21–0–1, 19 KOs) on 17 August 2013 at the Motorpoint Arena in Cardiff. On 9 July 2013, the official press conference took place to announce the fight. Cleverly, as champion, was given the underdog status by bookmakers. Cleverly said he had trained hard and was expecting the fight to be toughest of his career so far. Kovalev, who knocked out most of his opponents within three rounds, came out throwing heavy shots in the first round, hurt Cleverly badly in the third round, dropping him twice and nearly finishing him off. Kovalev picked things right back up in the fourth, throwing bombs to send Cleverly down for a third time and the referee waved things off 29 seconds into the round. Cleverly considered retiring after the bout, but decided not to. In October 2013, Cleverly told the Daily Mirror that he wanted to rematch Kovalev.

=== Cruiserweight ===
Cleverly made his Cruiserweight debut on 17 May 2014, defeating Shawn Corbin by second-round technical knockout to win the vacant WBA Inter-Continental Cruiserweight title. Cleverly successfully defended the title against Alejandro Emilio Valori on 12 July 2014 via fourth-round technical knockout.

==== Cleverly vs. Bellew II ====
On 22 November 2014 Cleverly and Tony Bellew had their rematch, this time they were both fighting as cruiserweights. The fight took place at the Echo Arena in Liverpool. This was also a WBO cruiserweight title eliminator. The title was held by Marco Huck at the time. The bout went 12 rounds as Bellew won via split decision (115–113, 116–112 & 114–115). In the post-fight interview, Bellew said, "I’m over the moon, listen it’s over, it’s put to bed. We said a lot of things. I don’t like him now, but it’s been settled tonight. It’s over, it’s done and I've outworked a great athlete." He also stated that he would do a rubber match at Millennium Stadium if there was any demand for it. Cleverly said he struggled with dealing with Bellew at a higher weight.

=== Return to light heavyweight ===
Cleverly moved back to light heavyweight following the loss to Bellew. His first fight back at his original weight was against Tomas Man (13–8, 8KOs) on 30 May 2015. Cleverly won via 1st-round KO.

==== Cleverly vs. Fonfara ====
On 16 October 2015 Cleverly fought Polish former world title challenger Andrzej Fonfara (27–3, 16 KOs) at UIC Pavilion in Chicago for the WBC International Light Heavyweight title. Fonfara outlasted Cleverly over 12 entertaining rounds to claim a victory by unanimous decision in the main event of a Premier Boxing Champions card. The judges scored it 115–113, 116–112, 116–112 for Fonfara. Combined, Cleverly and Fonfara set CompuBox records for the most combined punches thrown and landed in a light heavyweight fight, throwing 2,524 punches and landing 936, both CompuBox records. Fonfara also set individual records for a light heavyweight by landing 474 punches and attempting 1,413. Despite bleeding from a grotesquely swollen nose over the second half of the fight, Cleverly never stopped coming forward.

==== Cleverly vs. Brähmer ====
On 22 July 2016 it was announced on Sky Sports that Cleverly would finally meet his long-standing rival Jürgen Brähmer (48–2, 35 KOs) for the WBA 'Regular' light-heavyweight title on 1 October at the Jahnsportforum in Mecklenburg-Vorpommern in Germany. They were initially supposed to meet in 2011 at the O2, in London, and another fight was mooted in 2015, only for Cleverly to decide to fight in America against Fonfara. This was Braehmer's seventh defence of his title that he had held since 2013. On the night, Cleverly became a two-time world champion at light heavyweight, after Braehmer retired on his stool with an injured elbow at the end of the 6th round, which his promoter later confirmed was dislocated. The fight itself was back and forth action, with Braehmer winning most due to landing the more effective shots, particularly the left hook to the head. At the time of the stoppage, Braehmer was ahead 58–56 three times on the scorecards.

There was a rematch clause in the contract, which Braehmer said he would be taking. A day after the fight, there was already dispute between both camps as to where the rematch would be held, with promoter Eddie Hearn claiming Cleverly should have the home advantage.

==== Cleverly vs. Jack ====
After Badou Jack (21–1–2, 12 KOs) moved up to light heavyweight, on 19 June 2017, he revealed that his team were working towards a deal for him to fight Cleverly. He expected when the fight gets announced, it would be on the undercard of Floyd Mayweather Jr. vs. Conor McGregor in Las Vegas on 26 August 2017. On 19 July, according to sources, a deal was being close to being agreed from sides. On 27 July, the World Boxing Association ordered Cleverly for fight undefeated WBA interim champion Dmitry Bivol (11–0, 9 KOs), which would eventually establish a mandatory challenger for 'super' champion Andre Ward. Both camps were given 30 days or it would go to purse bids. On August 9, Eddie Hearn confirmed that terms had been agreed for a fight between Jack and Cleverly. It was also reported that whether the WBA 'regular' title would be at state at this point was uncertain, as mandatory challenger Bivol was yet to agree a step aside fee. On 12 August, the WBA's Championships Committee granted special permission for the fight to be contested for their light heavyweight title. They also made it clear that the winner would need to negotiate a deal to fight Bivol by 11 September 2017. Cleverly lost the bout via 5th round stoppage, losing his WBA title in the process. Cleverly had some success in round 2, throwing and landing continuously without hurting Jack. In round 4, Jack piled the pressure on Cleverly, who left himself open and ended up with a bloodied nose. The end came with Cleverly against the ropes and Jack pounding him with combinations. Referee stepped in and called an end to the fight at 2 minutes and 47 seconds of round 5. At the time of stoppage, Jack had landed 172 punches of 442 thrown (39%), while Cleverly, who threw 409, only landed 82 punches (20%). In the post-fight, Jack said, "I wanted to box him and feel him out while establishing my jab. Then the plan was to break him down from there. The plan was to finish him." Cleverly stated that he suffered a broken nose in the third round. Jack also told Jim Gray of Showtime, “You can’t leave it in the hands of the judges. You have to go for the kill,” referring to his previous fight decisions. Jack received a base purse of $750,000 and Cleverly earned $100,000.

=== Retirement ===
On 27 August 2017, Cleverly announced his retirement from boxing at the age of 30, having lost four of his last eight fights. He wrote on Twitter, "Time to say goodbye. Thank you and goodbye boxing. I've lived it and loved every second of this sport. A few too many miles on the clock." He ended with a record of 30 wins from 34 fights with 16 wins inside the distance. He suffered 4 losses.

== Professional boxing record ==
34 fights	30 wins	4 losses
By knockout	16	2
By decision	14	2

No.	Result	Record	Opponent	Type	Round, time	Date	Location	Notes
34	Loss	30–4	Badou Jack	TKO	5 (12), 2:47	26 Aug 2017	T-Mobile Arena, Paradise, Nevada, US	Lost WBA (Regular) light-heavyweight title
33	Win	30–3	Jürgen Brähmer	RTD	6 (12), 3:00	1 Oct 2016	Jahnsportforum, Neubrandenburg, Germany	Won WBA (Regular) light-heavyweight title
32	Loss	29–3	Andrzej Fonfara	UD	12	16 Oct 2015	UIC Pavilion, Chicago, Illinois, US	For WBC International light-heavyweight title
31	Win	29–2	Tomas Man	KO	1 (8), 0:24	30 May 2015	The O2 Arena, London, England	
30	Loss	28–2	Tony Bellew	SD	12	22 Nov 2014	Echo Arena, Liverpool, England	
29	Win	28–1	Alejandro Emilio Valori	TKO	4 (12), 1:16	12 Jul 2014	Echo Arena, Liverpool, England	Retained WBA Inter-Continental cruiserweight title
28	Win	27–1	Shawn Corbin	TKO	2 (12), 2:19	17 May 2014	Motorpoint Arena, Cardiff, Wales	Won vacant WBA Inter-Continental cruiserweight title
27	Loss	26–1	Sergey Kovalev	TKO	4 (12), 0:29	17 Aug 2013	Motorpoint Arena, Cardiff, Wales	Lost WBO light-heavyweight title
26	Win	26–0	Robin Krasniqi	UD	12	20 Apr 2013	Wembley Arena, London, England	Retained WBO light-heavyweight title
25	Win	25–0	Shawn Hawk	TKO	8 (12), 1:53	10 Nov 2012	Staples Center, Los Angeles, California, US	Retained WBO light-heavyweight title
24	Win	24–0	Tommy Karpency	UD	12	25 Feb 2012	Motorpoint Arena, Cardiff, Wales	Retained WBO light-heavyweight title
23	Win	23–0	Tony Bellew	MD	12	15 Oct 2011	Echo Arena, Liverpool, England	Retained WBO light-heavyweight title
22	Win	22–0	Aleksy Kuziemski	TKO	4 (12), 1:27	21 May 2011	The O2 Arena, London, England	Retained WBO light-heavyweight title
21	Win	21–0	Nadjib Mohammedi	UD	12	11 Dec 2010	Echo Arena, Liverpool, England	Won vacant WBO interim light-heavyweight title
20	Win	20–0	Karo Murat	RTD	9 (12), 3:00	18 Sep 2010	LG Arena, Birmingham, England	
19	Win	19–0	Antonio Brancalion	TKO	5 (12), 1:15	13 Feb 2010	Wembley Arena, London, England	Won vacant European light-heavyweight title
18	Win	18–0	Courtney Fry	TKO	8 (12), 2:51	9 Oct 2009	York Hall, London, England	Retained British and Commonwealth light-heavyweight titles
17	Win	17–0	Danny McIntosh	TKO	7 (12), 1:30	18 Jul 2009	York Hall, London, England	Retained Commonwealth light-heavyweight title; Won vacant British light-heavyweight title
16	Win	16–0	Billy Boyle	TKO	2 (12), 2:22	22 May 2009	York Hall, London, England	Retained Commonwealth light-heavyweight title
15	Win	15–0	Samson Onyango	TKO	1 (12), 2:15	13 Feb 2009	Oasis Leisure Centre, Swindon, England	Retained Commonwealth light-heavyweight Title
14	Win	14–0	Douglas Otieno Okola	TKO	4 (12), 2:39	12 Dec 2008	Kingsway Leisure Centre, Widnes, England	Retained Commonwealth light-heavyweight title
13	Win	13–0	Tony Oakey	UD	12	10 Oct 2008	Everton Park Sports Centre, Liverpool, England	Won vacant Commonwealth light-heavyweight title
12	Win	12–0	Antonio Baker	UD	8	19 Apr 2008	Thomas & Mack Center, Paradise, Nevada, US	
11	Win	11–0	Joey Vegas	PTS	8	3 Nov 2007	Millennium Stadium, Cardiff, Wales	
10	Win	10–0	Ayitey Powers	KO	6 (8), 2:43	21 Jul 2007	International Arena, Cardiff, Wales	
9	Win	9–0	Nick Okoth	PTS	8	7 Apr 2007	Millennium Stadium, Cardiff, Wales	
8	Win	8–0	Varuzhan Davtyan	PTS	4	18 Nov 2006	Newport Centre, Newport, Wales	
7	Win	7–0	Tony Quigley	TKO	5 (6), 0:57	14 Oct 2006	MEN Arena, Manchester, England	
6	Win	6–0	Mark Phillips	PTS	4	8 Jul 2006	Millennium Stadium, Cardiff, Wales	
5	Win	5–0	Brendan Halford	PTS	4	1 Jun 2006	Metrodome, Barnsley, England	
4	Win	4–0	Jon Foster	PTS	4	4 Mar 2006	MEN Arena, Manchester, England	
3	Win	3–0	Lance Hall	TKO	3 (4), 2:27	4 Dec 2005	Oakengates Theatre, Telford, England	
2	Win	2–0	Darren Gethin	PTS	4	10 Sep 2005	International Arena, Cardiff, Wales	
1	Win	1–0	Ernie Smith	PTS	4	23 Jul 2005	Meadowbank Sports Centre, Edinburgh, Scotland	

== See also ==
- List of Welsh boxing world champions

Sporting positions
Regional boxing titles
Vacant Title last held by Dean Francis	Commonwealth light-heavyweight champion 10 October 2008 – 12 March 2010; Vacated	Vacant Title next held by Tony Bellew
Vacant Title last held by Dean Francis	British light-heavyweight champion 18 July 2009 – 15 January 2011; Vacated	Vacant Title next held by Tony Bellew
Vacant Title last held by Jürgen Brähmer	European light-heavyweight champion 13 February 2010 – September 2010; Vacated	Vacant Title next held by Danny McIntosh
Vacant Title last held by Iago Kiladze	WBA Inter-Continental cruiserweight champion 17 May 2014 – November 2014; Vacated	Vacant Title next held by Mateusz Masternak
World boxing titles
Vacant Title last held by Jürgen Brähmer	WBO light-heavyweight champion Interim title 11 December 2010 – 19 May 2011; Promoted	Vacant
Preceded by Jürgen Brähmer stripped	WBO light-heavyweight champion 19 May 2011 – 17 August 2013	Succeeded by Sergey Kovalev
Preceded by Jürgen Brähmer	WBA light-heavyweight champion Regular title 1 October 2016 – 26 August 2017	Succeeded by Badou Jack
