= Andre Thysse =

South African boxer (1969–2021)

Personal information
- Nationality: South African
- Born: Andre Thysse; 24 March 1969 Germiston, South Africa
- Died: 22 July 2021 (aged 52)
- Height: 6 ft 1 in (185 cm)
- Weight: super middle/light heavyweight

Boxing career
- Stance: Orthodox

Boxing record
- Total fights: 28
- Wins: 20 (KO 12)
- Losses: 8 (KO 2)

Andre Thysse (24 March 1969 – 22 July 2021) was a South African professional super middle/light heavyweight boxer of the 1990s and 2000s.

== Biography ==
He won the Gauteng super middleweight title, South African super middleweight title, and Commonwealth super middleweight title. He was a challenger for the International Boxing Organization (IBO) super middleweight title against Brian Magee, World Boxing Council (WBC) super middleweight title against Markus Beyer, World Boxing Council (WBC) International super middleweight title against Mikkel Kessler, WBC International super middleweight title against Jürgen Brähmer, World Boxing Council (WBC) Continental Americas super middleweight title against Lucian Bute, World Boxing Council (WBC) International light heavyweight title against Adrian Diaconu, and International Boxing Federation (IBF) Australasian super middleweight title against Sakio Bika. His professional fighting weight varied from 163 3/4 lb (74.3 kg; 11 st 9.8 lb), i.e. super middleweight to 175 lb (79 kg; 12 st 7 lb), i.e. light heavyweight.

Thysse died on 22 July 2021 at the age of 52 after having contracted COVID-19.
