= Eduard Gutknecht =

German boxer (born 1982)

Personal information
- Nickname: Energy Eddy
- Nationality: German
- Born: 19 March 1982 (age 44) Dzhetysai, Kazakh SSR, Soviet Union
- Height: 1.82 m (6 ft 0 in)
- Weight: Super-middleweight; Light-heavyweight

Boxing career
- Stance: Orthodox

Boxing record
- Total fights: 36
- Wins: 30
- Win by KO: 13
- Losses: 5
- Draws: 1

Eduard Gutknecht (born 19 March 1982) is a German former professional boxer who competed from 2006 to 2016. He won the European light-heavyweight title in 2011, making three successful defences before losing it to Jürgen Brähmer in 2013. Gutknecht also challenged for the WBA light-heavyweight title, losing in a rematch against Brähmer in 2016.

In November 2016, he was rushed to a London hospital and had emergency surgery following a losing bout with George Groves. Gutknecht suffered a bleed in the skull and collapsed in the dressing room. His injuries left him unable to walk or talk and he suffered multiple strokes.

== Professional record ==
=== Gutknecht vs. Braehmer ===
On March 12, 2016, Gutknecht faced Juergen Braehmer for the WBA regular light heavyweight title. Braehmer won via unanimous decision, 118-110, 116-111 and 116-111.

=== Gutknecht vs. Groves ===
On November 18, 2016, Gutknecht faced George Groves. Groves won the fight convincingly, winning 119-109, 119 - 109 and 119-110 on the scorecards.

30 wins (13 knockouts), 5 losses, 1 draw
Result	Record	Opponent	Type	Round	Date	Location	Notes
Loss	30-5-1	(United Kingdom) George Groves	UD	12 (12)	2016-11-18	(United Kingdom) London	For WBA International super-middleweight title.
Win	30-4-1	(Ukraine) Artem Redko	KO	3 (8)	2016-06-18	(Germany) Niedersachsen	
Loss	29-4-1	(Germany) Jürgen Brähmer	UD	12 (12)	2016-03-12	(Germany) Neubrandenburg	For WBA Regular Light heavyweight title.
Win	29-3-1	(Armenia) Arman Torosyan	TKO	4 (10)	2015-11-21	(Germany) Niedersachsen	
Win	28-3-1	(Germany) Slavisa Simeunovic	RTD	5 (8)	2015-07-11	(Germany) Brandenburg	
Win	27–3-1	(Germany) Steve Kroekel	TKO	3 (8)	2015-05-02	(Germany) Berlin	
Win	26–3-1	(Germany) Christian Pawlak	UD	8	15 Nov 2014	(Germany) Hamburg	
Draw	25–3-1	(Argentina) Pablo Sosa	SD	8	2014-05-03	(Germany) Berlin	
Loss	25–3	(Russia) Dmitry Sukhotsky	RTD	4 (12)	2013-11-23	(Germany) Bamberg, Bayern	
Win	25–2	(Uruguay) Richard Vidal	UD	12	2013-06-08	(Germany) Prenzlauer Berg	Won vacant WBA Inter-Continental Light heavyweight title.
Loss	24–2	(Germany) Jürgen Brähmer	UD	12	2013-02-02	(Germany) Prenzlauer Berg	Lost EBU (European) Light heavyweight title. For vacant WBO International Light heavyweight title.
Win	24–1	(France) Tony Averlant	UD	12 (12)	2012-03-31	(Germany) Kiel	Defends EBU (European) Light heavyweight title.
Win	23–1	(Ukraine) Vyacheslav Uzelkov	UD	12 (12)	2012-02-04	(Germany) Frankfurt	Defends EBU (European) Light heavyweight title.
Win	22–1	(Italy) Lorenzo Di Giacomo	UD	12 (12)	2011-07-16	(Germany) Munich	Defends EBU (European) Light heavyweight title.
Win	21–1	(United Kingdom) Danny McIntosh	TKO	8 (12)	2011-05-07	(Germany) Neubrandenburg	Won EBU (European) Light heavyweight title.
Win	20–1	(Ukraine) Oleksandr Cherviak	UD	8 (8)	2011-02-12	(Germany) Mülheim	
Win	19–1	(Czech Republic) Michal Bilak	RTD	2 (8)	2010-07-17	(Germany) Schwerin	
Loss	18–1	(Germany) Robert Stieglitz	UD	12 (12)	2010-04-17	(Germany) Magdeburg	For WBO super middleweight title.
Won	18–0	(Hungary) Karoly Balzsay	SD	12 (12)	2009-12-04	(Austria) Sölden	Defends WBO Inter-Continental super middleweight title.
Won	17–0	(Brazil) Josival Lima Teixeira	UD	12 (12)	2009-08-22	(Hungary) Budapest	Won vacant WBO Inter-Continental super middleweight title.
Won	16–0	(United States) Rubin Williams	TKO	5 (10)	2009-02-07	(Germany) Rostock	
Won	15–0	(Germany) Christian Pawlak	UD	10 (10)	2008-11-22	(Germany) Rostock	
Won	14–0	(France) Philippe Mendy	UD	8 (8)	2008-08-29	(Germany) Düsseldorf	
Won	13–0	(Brazil) Jose Hilton Dos Santos	UD	8 (8)	2008-05-31	(Germany) Düsseldorf	
Won	12–0	(Argentina) Valentin Antonio Ochoa	UD	8 (8)	2008-03-08	(Germany) Krefeld	
Won	11–0	(France) Laurent Goury	UD	8 (8)	2007-11-13	(Germany) Göppingen	
Won	10–0	(Czech Republic) Roman Vanicky	UD	8 (8)	2007-09-15	(Germany) Rostock	
Won	9–0	(Germany) Christian Pawlak	UD	6 (6)	2007-07-14	(Germany) Hamburg	
Won	8–0	(Slovakia) Joseph Sovijus	KO	2 (6)	2007-05-18	(Germany) Gifhorn	
Won	7–0	(France) Magid Ben Driss	UD	6 (6)	2007-03-30	(Germany) Cologne	
Won	6–0	(Hungary) Gabor Zsalek	TKO	2 (6)	2007-02-27	(Germany) Cuxhaven	
Won	5–0	(Hungary) Zoltan Kallai	TKO	4 (6)	2007-01-27	(Germany) Düsseldorf	
Won	4–0	(Slovakia) Richard Remen	KO	1 (6)	2006-10-21	(Germany) Halle	
Won	3–0	(Slovakia) Gabriel Botos	TKO	2 (4)	2006-08-22	(Germany) Hamburg	
Won	2–0	(Belarus) Andrei Staliarou	KO	1 (4)	2006-07-29	(Germany) Oberhausen	
Won	1–0	(Slovakia) Lubo Hantak	UD	4 (4)	2006-05-27	(Germany) Munich	Professional debut.
