= Jürgen Brähmer =

German boxer (born 1978)

Personal information
- Nationality: German
- Born: 5 October 1978 (age 48) Stralsund, East Germany (now Germany)
- Height: 1.81 m (5 ft 11 in)
- Weight: Super-middleweight; Light-heavyweight

Boxing career
- Reach: 181 cm (71 in)
- Stance: Southpaw

Boxing record
- Total fights: 55
- Wins: 52
- Win by KO: 38
- Losses: 3

Jürgen Brähmer (born 5 October 1978) is a German professional boxer, who held the WBO title from 2009 to 2011, and the WBA (Regular) title from 2013 to 2016.

== Amateur career ==
As an amateur, Brähmer accumulated 95 wins in 100 fights including victories against Ricky Hatton in 1996, Felix Sturm in 1997 and Carl Froch in the final at the German championship in 1998.

== Professional career ==
=== Early career ===
Brähmer went undefeated in his first 27 professional fights, losing for the first time to fellow German Mario Veit by majority decision in May 2006. Brähmer avenged the loss a year later, beating Veit with a fourth-round knockout. Brähmer's first title challenge came against WBA light heavyweight champion Hugo Garay. Brähmer started the fight well but as the rounds went on, Garay was more consistent and he secured a unanimous decision in the end. The bout was broadcast by ZDF.

=== WBO light heavyweight champion ===
Brähmer won the EBU title on his next fight, beating Rachid Kanfouah with a round 5 technical knockout. Brähmer won the WBO interim light heavyweight title by knocking out Aleksy Kuziemski on 22 August 2009. On 13 November 2009, Brähmer became the WBO world light heavyweight world champion after the title was vacated by Zsolt Erdei, who moved up to cruiserweight. Brähmer successfully defended the title on 19 December 2009, winning a unanimous decision over Dmitry Sukhotsky and then again in 2010 against Mariano Plotinsky.

In January 2010, Brähmer was sentenced to 16 months in prison due to two separate instances of assault. During this time, the WBO issued an interim title, which was won by Nathan Cleverly. Brähmer was due to face Cleverly on 21 May 2011, but Brähmer withdrew from the bout the week of the fight citing an eye injury. Brähmer had previously called off a unification bout against Beibut Shumenov on less than a weeks' notice, citing "acute gastrointestinal illness". Due to his withdrawal, the WBO stripped Brähmer of his title and awarded it to Cleverly.

=== WBA (Regular) light heavyweight champion ===
Brähmer returned to the ring in January 2012, beating Jose Maria Guerrero by round 4 TKO. Brähmer went on to reclaim the European title against Eduard Gutknecht in February 2013.

After Beibut Shumenov was elevated to Super champion status by the WBA, Brahmer was given the chance to fight for the vacant WBA (Regular) title. In December 2013, he defeated Marcus Oliveira in Germany to claim the world title. He went on to successfully defend it against Enzo Maccarinelli, Roberto Bolonti, Pawel Glazewski, Robin Krasniqi, Konni Konrad, and Eduard Gutknecht on a rematch, winning four of those fights by stoppage. Brähmer lost the WBA title on October 1, 2016, to Nathan Cleverly. This was his seventh defence of the title. Brähmer retired on his stool after round 6, claiming a shoulder injury. A rematch was talked about following the fight.

=== World Boxing Super Series ===
In July 2017, Brähmer joined the super middleweight World Boxing Super Series. Brähmer hadn't fought at super middleweight in roughly a decade. He fought Rob Brant in the first round of the tournament, beating him by unanimous decision. He had to withdraw from the next fight and therefore the series due to an influenzal infection.

=== Post WBSS ===
In his first fight after dropping out of the WBSS, Brähmer fought veteran Pablo Nievas in Hamburg, Germany. It was an easy win for the German, who was in control throughout the fight and managed to force the referee to stop the fight with a flurry of punches towards Nievas in the fifth round.

In his next fight, Brähmer again won comfortably, this time bz way of knockout, flooring his opponent Kadrija in the second round with a vicious shot in the liver.

Brähmer scored his fourth win in a row over Jürgen Doberstein, on 21 December 2019. Brähmer scored a seventh-round KO win and looked impressive doing it, stating that he is ready for another world title run.

== Professional boxing record ==
55 fights	52 wins	3 losses
By knockout	38	1
By decision	14	2

No.	Result	Record	Opponent	Type	Round, time	Date	Location	Notes
55	Win	52–3	Jürgen Doberstein	KO	7 (12), 1:20	21 Dec 2019	Cruise Terminal, Hamburg, Germany	Won vacant IBF Inter-Continental super-middleweight title
54	Win	51–3	Erdogan Kadrija	KO	2 (8), 1:42	15 Jun 2019	Sport- und Kongresshalle, Schwerin, Germany	
53	Win	50–3	Pablo Daniel Zamora Nievas	TKO	5 (8), 2:18	15 Dec 2018	Sporthalle, Hamburg, Germany	
52	Win	49–3	Rob Brant	UD	12	27 Oct 2017	Sport- und Kongresshalle, Schwerin, Germany	World Boxing Super Series: super-middleweight quarter-final
51	Loss	48–3	Nathan Cleverly	RTD	6 (12), 3:00	1 Oct 2016	Jahnsportforum, Neubrandenburg, Germany	Lost WBA (Regular) light-heavyweight title
50	Win	48–2	Eduard Gutknecht	UD	12	12 Mar 2016	Jahnsportforum, Neubrandenburg, Germany	Retained WBA (Regular) light-heavyweight title
49	Win	47–2	Konni Konrad	RTD	7 (12), 3:00	5 Sep 2015	EnergieVerbund Arena, Dresden, Germany	Retained WBA (Regular) light-heavyweight title
48	Win	46–2	Robin Krasniqi	RTD	9 (12), 3:00	21 Mar 2015	Rostock, Germany	Retained WBA (Regular) light-heavyweight title
47	Win	45–2	Paweł Głażewski	KO	1 (12), 0:55	6 Dec 2014	Large EWE Arena, Oldenburg, Germany	Retained WBA (Regular) light-heavyweight title
46	Win	44–2	Roberto Bolonti	UD	12	7 Jun 2014	Sport- und Kongresshalle, Schwerin, Germany	Retained WBA (Regular) light-heavyweight title
45	Win	43–2	Enzo Maccarinelli	RTD	5 (12), 3:00	5 Apr 2014	StadtHalle, Rostock, Germany	Retained WBA (Regular) light-heavyweight title
44	Win	42–2	Marcus Oliveira	UD	12	14 Dec 2013	Jahnsportforum, Neubrandenburg, Germany	Won vacant WBA (Regular) light-heavyweight title
43	Win	41–2	Stefano Abatangelo	UD	12	24 Aug 2013	Sport- und Kongresshalle, Schwerin, Germany	Retained WBO International and European light-heavyweight titles
42	Win	40–2	Tony Averlant	TKO	2 (12), 2:36	27 Apr 2013	Alsterdorfer Sporthalle, Hamburg, Germany	Retained European light-heavyweight title
41	Win	39–2	Eduard Gutknecht	UD	12	2 Feb 2013	Max-Schmeling-Halle, Berlin, Germany	Won European and vacant WBO International light-heavyweight titles
40	Win	38–2	Vikapita Meroro	UD	10	21 Apr 2012	Sport- und Kongresshalle, Schwerin, Germany	
39	Win	37–2	Jose Maria Guerrero	TKO	4 (8), 2:37	28 Jan 2012	Grand Elysée Hotel, Hamburg, Germany	
38	Win	36–2	Mariano Plotinsky	TKO	5 (12), 2:36	24 Apr 2010	Alsterdorfer Sporthalle, Hamburg, Germany	Retained WBO light-heavyweight title
37	Win	35–2	Dmitry Sukhotsky	UD	12	19 Dec 2009	Sport- und Kongresshalle, Schwerin, Germany	Retained WBO light-heavyweight title
36	Win	34–2	Aleksy Kuziemski	TKO	11 (12), 0:39	22 Aug 2009	SYMA Sports and Conference Centre, Budapest, Hungary	Won vacant WBO interim light-heavyweight title
35	Win	33–2	Antonio Brancalion	TKO	1 (12), 1:23	6 Jun 2009	König Pilsener Arena, Oberhausen, Germany	Retained European light-heavyweight title
34	Win	32–2	Rachid Kanfouah	TKO	5 (12), 2:30	7 Mar 2009	Freiberger Arena, Dresden, Germany	Won vacant European light-heavyweight title
33	Loss	31–2	Hugo Garay	UD	12	22 Nov 2008	StadtHalle, Rostock, Germany	For WBA light-heavyweight title
32	Win	31–1	Karim Bennama	TKO	9 (10), 1:43	5 Apr 2008	Burg-Wächter Castello, Düsseldorf, Germany	
31	Win	30–1	Mario Veit	KO	4 (12), 0:47	15 Sep 2007	StadtHalle, Rostock, Germany	Retained WBO Inter-Continental super-middleweight title
30	Win	29–1	Héctor Javier Velazco	UD	12	19 May 2007	Color Line Arena, Hamburg, Germany	Won vacant WBO Inter-Continental super-middleweight title
29	Win	28–1	Francisco Mora	KO	8 (10), 1:55	28 Oct 2006	Porsche-Arena, Stuttgart, Germany	
28	Loss	27–1	Mario Veit	MD	12	27 May 2006	Zenith, Munich, Germany	Lost WBC International super-middleweight title
27	Win	27–0	Andre Thysse	UD	12	4 Feb 2006	Burg-Wächter Castello, Düsseldorf, Germany	Won vacant WBC International super-middleweight title
26	Win	26–0	Henry Porras	TKO	7 (10), 1:52	26 Nov 2005	Wilhelm-Dopatka-Halle, Leverkusen, Germany	
25	Win	25–0	Roman Aramyan	TKO	6 (8), 0:05	15 Oct 2005	Burg-Wächter Castello, Düsseldorf, Germany	
24	Win	24–0	Omar Eduardo Gonzalez	UD	12	12 Oct 2002	Sport- und Kongresshalle, Schwerin, Germany	Won vacant WBC International super-middleweight title
23	Win	23–0	Francisco Lares	TKO	3 (6), 2:43	6 Apr 2002	Universum Gym, Hamburg, Germany	
22	Win	22–0	Roberto Martins	TKO	2 (8)	16 Mar 2002	Hanns-Martin-Schleyer-Halle, Stuttgart, Germany	
21	Win	21–0	Mike Coker	TKO	2 (8)	15 Dec 2001	Estrel Hotel, Berlin, Germany	
20	Win	20–0	Ray Domenge	KO	3 (8), 0:25	24 Nov 2001	Universum Gym, Hamburg, Germany	
19	Win	19–0	Rudi Lupo	KO	2 (8)	29 Sep 2001	Universum Gym, Hamburg, Germany	
18	Win	18–0	Tony Menefee	TKO	1 (8), 2:43	28 Jul 2001	Estrel Hotel, Berlin, Germany	
17	Win	17–0	George Klinesmith	KO	1, 1:55	5 May 2001	Volkswagen Halle, Braunschweig, Germany	
16	Win	16–0	Juan Carlos Viloria	TKO	5	7 Apr 2001	Universum Gym, Hamburg, Germany	
15	Win	15–0	Rob Bleakley	TKO	4	24 Mar 2001	Rudi-Sedlmayer-Halle, Munich, Germany	
14	Win	14–0	Patrick Swann	TKO	5	24 Feb 2001	Alsterdorfer Sporthalle, Hamburg, Germany	
13	Win	13–0	Pat Lawlor	TKO	1	10 Feb 2001	Estrel Hotel, Berlin, Germany	
12	Win	12–0	Jerry Williams	UD	6	5 Dec 2000	Universum Gym, Hamburg, Germany	
11	Win	11–0	Domenico Alfano	TKO	1 (8)	25 Nov 2000	Preussag Arena, Hanover, Germany	
10	Win	10–0	Marino Monteyne	TKO	3 (6), 0:34	14 Oct 2000	Kölnarena, Cologne, Germany	
9	Win	9–0	Jason Collins	KO	1 (6)	1 Oct 2000	Universum Gym, Hamburg, Germany	
8	Win	8–0	Vedran Akrap	UD	6	28 May 2000	Universum Gym, Hamburg, Germany	
7	Win	7–0	Mario Lupp	KO	1 (6)	6 May 2000	Swissotel, Neuss, Germany	
6	Win	6–0	Antonio Ribeiro	TKO	2 (6)	15 Apr 2000	Preussag Arena, Hanover, Germany	
5	Win	5–0	Robert Davis	KO	2 (6)	1 Apr 2000	Estrel Hotel, Berlin, Germany	
4	Win	4–0	Zsolt Janko	TKO	1 (6)	18 Mar 2000	Alsterdorfer Sporthalle, Hamburg, Germany	
3	Win	3–0	Ramdane Kaouane	KO	2 (4)	11 Mar 2000	Hansehalle, Lübeck, Germany	
2	Win	2–0	Ferousi Ilunga	KO	1 (4)	5 Feb 2000	Rhein-Ruhr Halle, Duisburg, Germany	
1	Win	1–0	Ramdane Kaouane	PTS	4	11 Dec 1999	Alsterdorfer Sporthalle, Hamburg, Germany	

Sporting positions
Regional boxing titles
Vacant Title last held by Markus Beyer	WBC International super-middleweight champion 12 October 2002 – April 2003; Vacated	Vacant Title next held by Mikkel Kessler
Vacant Title last held by Otis Grant	WBC International super-middleweight champion 4 February 2006 – 27 May 2006	Succeeded by Mario Veit
Vacant Title last held by Lucian Bute	WBO Inter-Continental super-middleweight champion 19 May 2007 – November 2007; Vacated	Vacant Title last held by Károly Balzsay
Vacant Title last held by Yuri Barashian	European light-heavyweight champion 7 March 2009 – August 2009; Vacated	Vacant Title last held by Nathan Cleverly
Vacant Title last held by Robin Krasniqi	WBO International light-heavyweight champion 2 February 2013 – December 2013; Vacated	Vacant Title last held by Robin Krasniqi
Preceded by Eduard Gutknecht	European light-heavyweight champion 2 February 2013 – December 2013; Vacated	Vacant Title last held by Igor Mikhalkin
World boxing titles
New title	WBO light-heavyweight champion Interim title 22 August 2009 – 13 November 2009; Promoted	Vacant Title next held by Nathan Cleverly
Preceded by Zsolt Erdei vacated	WBO light-heavyweight champion 13 November 2009 – 19 May 2011; Stripped	Succeeded by Nathan Cleverly promoted from interim status
Vacant Title last held by Fabrice Tiozzo	WBA light-heavyweight champion Regular title 15 December 2013 – 1 October 2016	Succeeded by Nathan Cleverly
