= Shawn Corbin =

Trinidad and Tobago boxer

Personal information
- Nationality: (Trinidad and Tobago) Trinidadian
- Born: Shawn Corbin; 21 February 1975 (age 51) Guyana
- Height: 6 ft 3 in (1.91 m)
- Weight: Light Heavyweight; Cruiserweight

Boxing career

Boxing record
- Total fights: 23
- Wins: 17
- Win by KO: 12
- Losses: 6
- Draws: 0

Shawn Corbin (born 21 February 1975) is a Trinidadian professional boxer, competing in the Cruiserweight weight class.

== Professional career ==
On January 30, 2010, Corbin fought Karo Murat for the WBO Inter-Continental Light Heavyweight title, but lost by second-round technical knockout.

On April 13, 2013, Corbin fought Mateusz Masternak for the vacant WBC International Silver Cruiserweight title, but lost by ninth-round technical knockout.

On May 17, 2014, Corbin fought Nathan Cleverly for the vacant WBA Inter-Continental Cruiserweight title, but lost by second-round technical knockout.

== Professional boxing record ==
17 Wins (12 knockouts, 4 decisions, 1 disqualification), 5 Losses, 0 Draws
Res.	Record	Opponent	Type	Rd., Time	Date	Location	Notes
Loss	17–5	(United Kingdom) Nathan Cleverly	TKO	2 (12), 2:19	2014-05-17	(United Kingdom) Motorpoint Arena Cardiff, Cardiff, Wales	For vacant WBA Inter-Continental Cruiserweight title.
Win	17–4	(Guyana) Anthony Augustin	RTD	2 (6)	2013-12-26	(Guyana) Mackenzie Sports Club, Linden	
Win	16–4	(Trinidad and Tobago) Kenneth Bishop	TKO	3 (8), 0:33	2013-12-01	(Trinidad and Tobago) Marabella	
Loss	15–4	(Poland) Mateusz Masternak	TKO	9 (12), 1:01	2013-04-13	(Denmark) Arena Nord, Frederikshavn	For vacant WBC International Silver Cruiserweight title.
Win	15–3	(Guyana) Wayne Braithwaite	UD	12	2012-10-26	(Guyana) Cliff Anderson Sports Hall, Georgetown	Won vacant WBC CABOFE Cruiserweight title.
Loss	14–3	(Poland) Dawid Kostecki	TKO	4 (10), 2:51	2010-10-23	(Poland) Hotel Hilton ul., Grzybowska 63, Warsaw	For vacant WBC Baltic Light Heavyweight title.
Win	14–2	(Guyana) Cleveland Fraser	TKO	5 (10)	2010-04-24	(Trinidad and Tobago) Central Indoor Regional Auditorium, Chaguanas	Retained WBC CABOFE Light Heavyweight title.
Loss	13–2	(Germany) Karo Murat	TKO	2 (12), 2:41	2010-01-30	(Germany) Jahnsportforum, Neubrandenburg, Mecklenburg-Vorpommern	For WBO Inter-Continental Light Heavyweight title.
Win	13–1	(Barbados) Curtis Murray	RTD	7 (8), 0:10	2010-01-02	(Trinidad and Tobago) Central Indoor Regional Auditorium, Chaguanas	
Win	12–1	(Guyana) Theophilus King	TKO	3 (?), 2:59	2009-07-31	(Trinidad and Tobago) Indoor Sports Arena, Saith Park	
Win	11–1	(Guyana) Leon Gilkes	TKO	5 (10), 2:29	2008-12-26	(Trinidad and Tobago) Jean Pierre Sports Complex, Mucurapo	Won vacant WBC CABOFE Light Heavyweight title.
Win	10–1	(Colombia) Tomas Orozco Rodriguez	TKO	5 (12), 2:44	2008-03-29	(Trinidad and Tobago) Dr. João Havelange Centre of Excellence, Tunapuna	
Win	9–1	(Guyana) Leon Gilkes	UD	8	2007-11-30	(Trinidad and Tobago) Cosmic Gym, Marabella	
Loss	8–1	(Panama) Tito Mendoza	TKO	10 (10), 1:30	2007-04-25	Atlapa Convention Centre, Panama City	
Win	8–0	(Trinidad and Tobago) John Monroy	KO	2 (6), 1:23	2007-04-09	(Trinidad and Tobago) Beetham Gardens Recreation Ground, Port of Spain	
Win	7–0	(Barbados) Julian Tannis	TKO	3 (4), 1:38	2007-01-07	(Trinidad and Tobago) Africa Recreation Ground, Port of Spain	
Win	6–0	(Colombia) Antonio Mercado	DQ	5 (6)	2006-12-26	(Trinidad and Tobago) Jean Pierre Sports Complex, Mucurapo	
Win	5–0	(Barbados) Julian Tannis	KO	3 (?), 1:58	2005-10-28	(Trinidad and Tobago) Camp Ogden, Saint James	
Win	4–0	Trevor Greaves	TKO	2 (6), 1:49	2005-08-13	(Trinidad and Tobago) Camp Ogden, Saint James	
Win	3–0	(Trinidad and Tobago) John Monroy	TKO	5 (6)	2005-06-16	(Trinidad and Tobago) Petrotrin Grounds, Fyzabad	
Win	2–0	(United States) Jameson Bostic	UD	4	2004-10-14	(United States) New York Hilton Midtown, New York City, New York	
Win	1–0	(Trinidad and Tobago) Ricardo Innes	PTS	4	2001-11-02	(Trinidad and Tobago) Port of Spain	Professional debut.
