= Paweł Głażewski =

Polish boxer

Personal information
- Nickname: Głaz ("Stone")
- Nationality: Polish
- Born: 1 October 1982 (age 43) Białystok, Poland
- Height: 1.79 m (5 ft 10 in)
- Weight: Light-heavyweight

Boxing career
- Stance: Orthodox

Boxing record
- Total fights: 28
- Wins: 23
- Win by KO: 5
- Losses: 5

Paweł Głażewski (born 1 September 1982) is a Polish professional boxer who has challenged once for the WBA light-heavyweight title.

== Amateur career ==
Głażewski was the Polish Senior Champion in amateur boxing three times. In 2005, 2006 and 2008.

== Professional career ==
Paweł Głażewski turned pro in 2007. When he won the fight against Leo Tchoula, he won the BBU International Champion. On August 18 he won the WBC Baltic Silver belt. He stopped French boxer Abdelkader Benzinia.

=== Roy Jones vs. Paweł Głażewski ===
Jones was supposed to face Dawid Kostecki in a ten-round bout at Atlas Arena, Poland on June 30. Days before the fight, Kostecki was convicted of being the ringleader of a criminal organization and was thrown in jail. Paweł Głażewski stepped in to fight Jones instead. Jones defeated the 17–0 Głażewski by split decision.

Jones was knocked down in round six. Many felt Głażewski deserved the decision in a close fight. Judges scored 96–93 96–94 for Jones, and 95–94 for Głażewski. Polish TV scored the fight 97–94 for Głażewski.

== Professional boxing record ==
23 Wins (5 knockouts, 18 decisions), 5 Losses (2 knockout, 3 decisions), 0 Draws
Res.	Record	Opponent	Type	Round	Date	Location	Notes
Loss	23–5	(Poland) Bartłomiej Grafka	SD	8	2015-10-17	(Poland) Wieliczka	
Loss	23–4	(Poland) Maciej Miszkin	UD	10	2015-04-18	(Poland) Legionowo	For WBC Baltic Light heavyweight title
Loss	23–3	(Germany) Jürgen Brähmer	KO	1 (12)	2014-12-06	(Germany) Oldenburg	For WBA World Light Heavyweight title
Win	23–2	(United States) Rowland Bryant	UD	8	2014-08-16	(Poland) Międzyzdroje	
Win	22–2	(Poland) Maciej Miszkin	MD	8	2014-02-26	(Poland) Legionowo	
Win	21–2	(Belarus) Andrei Salakhutdzinau	UD	8	2013-12-06	(Poland) Białobrzegi	
Loss	20–2	(France) Hadillah Mohoumadi	TKO	7 (12)	2013-06-29	(Poland) Ostróda	
Win	20–1	(Poland) Bartlomiej Grafka	UD	10	2013-02-23	(Poland) Gdańsk	
Win	19–1	(Ukraine) Oleksandr Garashchenko	TKO	3 (8)	2012-12-09	(Poland) Białobrzegi	
Win	18–1	(Algeria) Sofiane Sebihi	UD	10	2012-10-13	(Poland) Wieliczka	Retained Polish International Light heavyweight title
Loss	17–1	(United States) Roy Jones Jr.	SD	10	2012-06-30	(Poland) Łódź	
Win	17–0	(United Kingdom) Matthew Barney	UD	6	2011-12-03	(Poland) Warsaw	
Win	16–0	(France) Doudou Ngumbu	SD	10	2011-09-16	(Poland) Warsaw	Retained WBC Baltic Silver and Polish International Light heavyweight titles
Win	15–0	(Albania) Orial Kolaj	PTS	6	2011-03-20	(Poland) Nowy Dwór Mazowiecki	
Win	14–0	(Czech Republic) Tomáš Adámek	UD	10	2010-11-12	(Poland) Wieliczka	Retained Polish International Light heavyweight title
Win	13–0	(France) Abdelkader Benzinia	UD	10	2010-08-18	(Poland) Międzyzdroje	Won vacant WBC Baltic Silver and Polish International Light heavyweight title.
Win	12–0	(France) Tony Averlant	UD	6	2010-06-19	(Poland) Kielce	
Win	11–0	(Germany) Mounir Toumi	TKO	2 (6)	2010-04-24	(Poland) Gdynia	
Win	10–0	(France) Martial Bella Oleme	UD	8	2010-03-07	(Poland) Warsaw	
Win	9–0	(Latvia) Andrejs Tolstihs	UD	6	2009-11-21	(Poland) Białystok	
Win	8–0	(Cameroon) Leo Tchoula	PTS	6	2009-10-25	(Poland) Nowy Dwór	Won Baltic Boxing Union International Light heavyweight title.
Win	7–0	(Germany) Steve Krökel	UD	6	2009-08-18	(Poland) Międzyzdroje	
Win	6–0	(Lithuania) Kirill Psonko	PTS	4	2009-06-13	(Poland) Oleśnica	
Win	5–0	(Latvia) Martins Kukulis	TKO	5 (6)	2009-05-31	(Poland) Warka	
Win	4–0	(Latvia) Florians Strupits	UD	4	2009-04-24	(Poland) Jarosław	
Win	3–0	(Poland) Mariusz Radziszewski	UD	4	2009-02-28	(Poland) Lublin	
Win	2–0	(Latvia) Aleksandrs Dunecs	TKO	2 (4)	2009-02-22	(Poland) Łomianki	
Win	1–0	(Slovakia) Miroslav Kvocka	TKO	3 (4)	2008-12-14	(Poland) Białystok	Professional debut
