= Aleksy Kuziemski =

Polish boxer

Personal information
- Nickname: Ali
- Nationality: Polish
- Born: 9 May 1977 (age 49) Świecie, Poland
- Height: 5 ft 11 in (1.80 m)
- Weight: Light heavyweight

Boxing career
- Reach: 72 in (183 cm)
- Stance: Orthodox

Boxing record
- Total fights: 28
- Wins: 23
- Win by KO: 7
- Losses: 5
Medal record
Men's boxing
Representing Poland
World Amateur Championships
| Bronze medal – third place | 2003 Bangkok | Light heavyweight |
European Amateur Championships
| Bronze medal – third place | 2004 Pula | Light heavyweight |
EU Amateur Championships
| Silver medal – second place | 2004 Madrid | Light heavyweight |

Aleksy Kuziemski (born 9 May 1977) is a Polish professional boxer and light-heavyweight world title challenger.

== Amateur career ==
As an amateur, Kuziemski for Astoria Bydgoszcz won a bronze medal at the 2003 World Amateur Boxing Championships in the light heavyweight division, and another bronze at the 2004 European Amateur Boxing Championships. He then participated in the 2004 Summer Olympics, where he lost in the first round of the light heavyweight division to Beibut Shumenov.

== Professional career ==
On 22 August 2009, Kuziemski challenged Jürgen Brähmer for the WBO interim light heavyweight title. Brähmer won by eleventh-round stoppage. On 21 May 2011, Kuziemski challenged Nathan Cleverly for the WBO world light heavyweight title, but was stopped in four rounds.

== Professional boxing record ==
28 fights, 23 wins (7 knockouts), 5 losses
| Res. | Record | Opponent | Type | Round | Date | Location | Notes |
| Loss | 23-5 | (Canada) Jean Pascal | UD | 10 | 2012-12-14 | (Canada) Montreal | |
| Win | 23-4 | (Germany) Leo Tchoula | TKO | 2 (6) | 2012-03-10 | (Poland) Łomża | |
| Loss | 22-4 | (France) Doudou Ngumbu | UD | 12 | 2011-11-26 | (Poland) Białystok | For vacant WBF Light heavyweight title. |
| Win | 22-3 | (Czech Republic) Roman Vanicky | TKO | 2 (6) | 2011-08-05 | (Poland) Częstochowa | |
| Loss | 21-3 | (United Kingdom) Nathan Cleverly | TKO | 3 (12) | 2011-05-21 | (United Kingdom) London | For WBO Light heavyweight title. |
| Win | 21-2 | (Latvia) Arturs Kulikauskis | PTS | 6 | 2011-04-15 | (Poland) Stare Jeżewo | |
| Win | 20-2 | (Estonia) Dmitri Protkunas | TKO | 3 (6) | 2010-12-19 | (Poland) Białystok | |
| Loss | 19-2 | (Russia) Dmitry Sukhotsky | TKO | 6 (12) | 2010-10-29 | (Russia) Saint Petersburg | |
| Win | 19-1 | (Russia) Igor Mikhalkin | UD | 10 | 2010-05-22 | (Germany) Rostock | Won vacant German International Light heavyweight title. |
| Win | 18-1 | (Germany) Lars Buchholz | UD | 8 | 2010-03-06 | (Poland) Katowice | |
| Loss | 17-1 | (Germany) Jürgen Brähmer | TKO | 11 (12) | 2009-08-22 | (Hungary) Budapest | For interim WBO Light heavyweight title. |
| Win | 17-0 | (Germany) Armin Dollinger | TKO | 5 (12) | 2009-03-07 | (Germany) Dresden | |
| Win | 16–0 | (Lithuania) Mantas Tarvydas | TKO | 7 (12) | 2008-11-22 | (Germany) Rostock | |
| Win | 15–0 | (Latvia) Jevgenijs Andrejevs | UD | 8 | 2008-05-10 | (Germany) Halle an der Saale | |
| Win | 14–0 | (Brazil) Peter Venancio | UD | 12 | 2007-12-04 | (Austria) Sölden | |
| Win | 13–0 | (Argentina) Julio Cesar Dominguez | TKO | 12 (12) | 2007-09-15 | (Germany) Rostock | |
| Win | 12–0 | (Czech Republic) Ladislav Kutil | UD | 8 | 2007-06-12 | (Slovenia) Maribor | |
| Win | 11–0 | (France) Karim Bennama | UD | 8 | 2007-02-27 | (Germany) Cuxhaven | |
| Win | 10–0 | (Czech Republic) Roman Vanicky | UD | 8 | 2007-01-27 | (Germany) Düsseldorf | |
| Win | 9–0 | (Belarus) Sergey Karanevich | UD | 8) | 2006-12-02 | (Germany) Neukölln | |
| Win | 8–0 | (Belarus) Mahamed Ariphadzhieu | MD | 8 | 2006-07-25 | (Germany) Eimsbuettel | |
| Win | 7–0 | (France) Christopher Robert | UD | 6 | 2006-03-07 | (Germany) Cuxhaven | |
| Win | 6–0 | (Belarus) Artem Solomko | UD | 6 | 2006-01-24 | (Germany) Wandsbek | |
| Win | 5–0 | (Italy) Dario Cichello | UD | 6 | 2005-11-15 | (Germany) Göppingen | |
| Win | 4–0 | (Serbia) Enad Licina | UD | 6 | 2005-09-20 | (Czech Republic) Prague | |
| Win | 3–0 | (Georgia (country)) Alexander Beroshvili | UD | 4 | 2005-06-18 | (Croatia) Pula | |
| Win | 2–0 | (Czech Republic) Radek Seman | UD | 4 | 2005-04-19 | (Austria) Bischofshofen | |
| Win | 1–0 | (Democratic Republic of the Congo) Mayala Mbungi | TKO | 3 (4) | 2005-03-05 | (Germany) Leverkusen | Professional debut. |
