= Sofiane Sebihi =

Algerian boxer

Personal information
- Nationality: (Algeria) Algerian
- Born: Sofiane Sebihi; February 27, 1979 (age 47) Koléa, Algeria
- Height: 6 ft 0 in (1.83 m)
- Weight: Light Heavyweight

Boxing career
- Stance: Musulman

Boxing record
- Total fights: 25
- Wins: 20
- Win by KO: 14
- Losses: 5
- Draws: 0
- No contests: 0

Sofiane Sebihi (born February 27, 1979, in Koléa) is an Algerian professional boxer. He is currently training in Geneva, Switzerland.

== Personal ==
Sebihi was born on February 27, 1979, in the town of Koléa, Tipaza, and grew up in Bou Ismaïl.

== Career ==
Sebihi began boxing at the age of 7. He fought over 200 amateur fights in Algeria, including the Algerian championships, African civil and military championships and the World Military Championships in Ireland in 2002 (he lost by points against Russian champion Matvey Korobov, world military champion 2002 + 2003).

September 2003, Sebihi travelled to Switzerland for his professional fight against Sébastien Kialanda, October 1. Sebihi won the fight by knockout in the 5th round. Then he stayed in the country and started his European professional career from Geneva.

October 18, 2005, Sebihi surprised by winning the undefeated French light-heavyweight champion Jean-Louis Mandengue live on Eurosport. He shocked his opponent by a first violent knock out from the first round. During the second, Mandengue was sent spectacularly outside the ring. The fight went on until the 9th round when the French corner abandoned after two new k.o.'s

February 25, 2011, Sebihi beats Vigan Mustafa by knockout in the 11th round and wins the IBF International light heavyweight title. Once again the terrific final knock out was seen live on TV (RaiSport 1): the Italian referee did not interrupt the action while Mustafa, still standing, was already groggy: Sebihi hit him three more times and Mustafa went on the ground, inanimate during some eternal minutes. The referee had to leave the hall of Florence under escort of 8 policemen...

October 13, 2012, Sebihi went to Poland to fight for a WBC Silver Baltic title against Pawel Glazewski in the salt mine of Wieliczka (125 meters underground). The day before the fight, without a single explanation, the title WBC was cancelled. The fight would be maintained but judged only by polish judges. Sebihi decided to fight, hoping he would win by knock out. The evening came, Sebihi was clearly winning since the beginning while Glazewski was impeding the match by hanging on all the time (the referee never sanctioned him). The k.o. did not come and Sebihi absurdly and largely lost on the judges' scorecards (Wlodzimierz Gulc 92-99|Piotr Kozlowski 94-98|juge: Eugeniusz Tuszynski 91–100). It was live on the polish Canal+ Sport TV.
