= Sport- und Kongresshalle =

Multi-purpose hall in Schwerin, Germany

Coordinates: 53°37′38.74″N 11°23′34.12″E

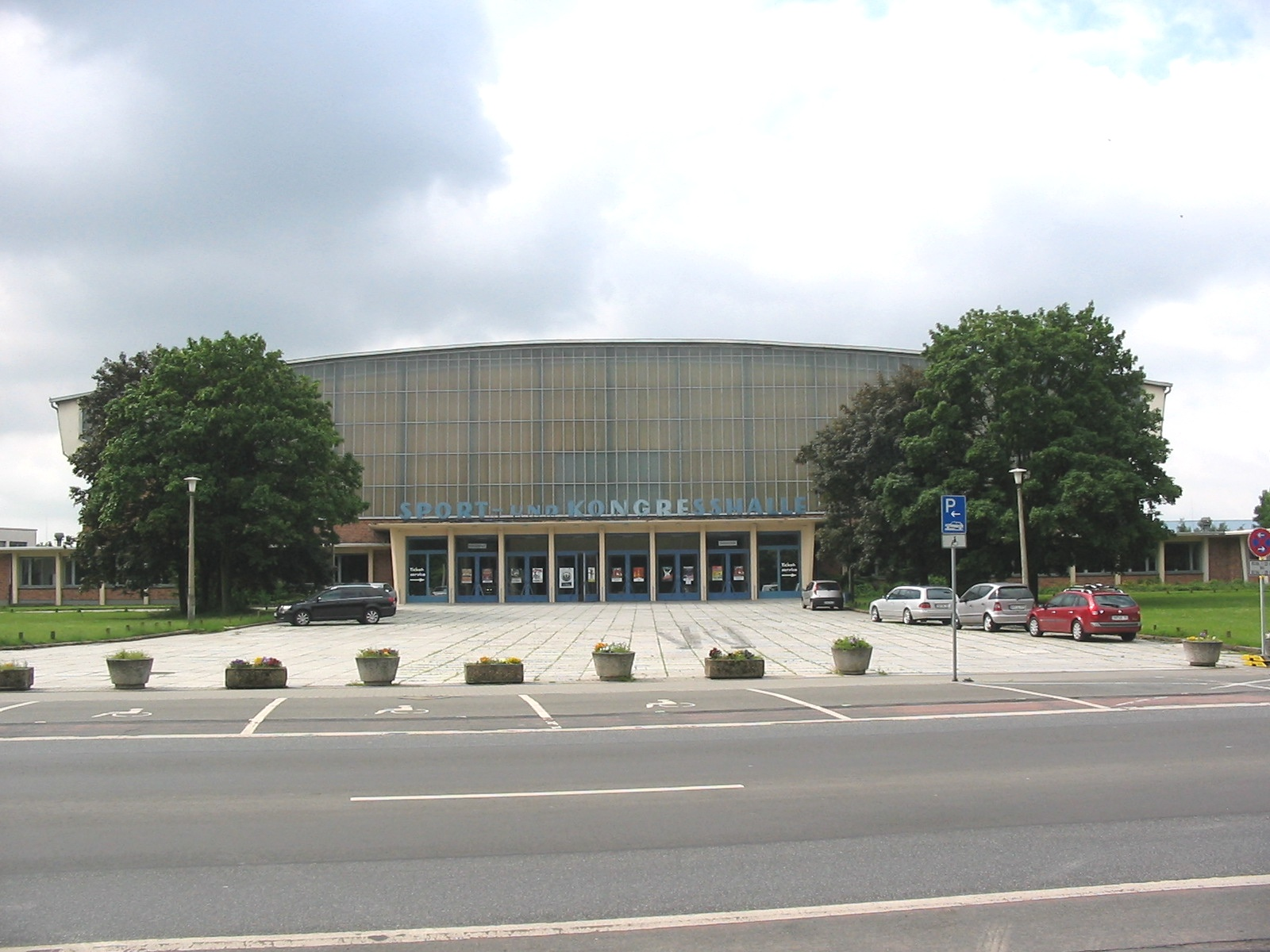
- Interactive map of Sport- und Kongresshalle
- Location: Schwerin, Mecklenburg-Vorpommern; Germany
- Owner: City of Schwerin
- Capacity: 8,000 handball); 8,000 (Boxing)

Construction
- Groundbreaking: 1958
- Opened: 1962
- Renovated: 2009

Tenant
- SV Post Schwerin (handball) (1966–present)

Sport- und Kongresshalle is an indoor sporting arena located in Schwerin, Germany. The capacity of the arena is 8,000 people. It is currently home to the SV Post Schwerin handball team.
