= Carl Froch vs. Lucian Bute =

Boxing match

No Easy Way Out
- Date: 26 May 2012
- Venue: Nottingham Arena, Nottingham, East Midlands, UK
- Title on the line: IBF Super Middleweight Championship

Tale of the tape
Boxer	(Romania) Lucian Bute	(United Kingdom) Carl Froch
Nickname	"Le Tombeur"; Mister KO	"The Cobra"
Hometown	Pechea, Sud-Est, Romania	Nottingham, East Midlands, United Kingdom
Pre-fight record	30–0 (24 KO)	28–2 (20 KO)
Age	32 years, 2 months	34 years, 10 months
Height	6 ft 2 in (188 cm)	6 ft 1 in (185 cm)
Weight	167 3/4 lb (76 kg)	167 1/4 lb (76 kg)
Style	Southpaw	Orthodox
Recognition	IBF; Super Middleweight Champion; The Ring; No. 1 Ranked Super Middleweight	IBF; No. 1 Ranked Super Middleweight; The Ring; No. 2 Ranked Super Middleweight

Result
- Froch beats Bute by KO in 5th round

Carl Froch vs. Lucian Bute, billed as No Easy Way Out, a professional boxing match contested on 26 May 2012 for the IBF Super Middleweight title at the Capital FM Arena in Nottingham, United Kingdom.

The card was a co-production of Eddie Hearn's Matchroom Boxing and Jean Bedard's Interbox promotions and televised via Epix and Sky Sports. Showtime was not interested in this fight. Bute had one fight left on his Showtime deal. Rumours said that Showtime wanted to put on a fight between Lucian Bute and Bernard Hopkins or Andre Ward instead of Froch.

== Background ==
=== Froch ===
Carl Froch was involved in Showtime's Super Six World Boxing Classic tournament. He ended up reaching the final, losing to Andre Ward. Then, IBF officially enforced Carl Froch as Lucian Bute's number one mandatory.

=== Bute ===
Lucian Bute's 3-fight Showtime deal was supposed to culminate in a showdown against the Super 6 winner, but Andre Ward was injured in the final. The American also criticised Bute's record, saying he would need to beat some top opponents to earn the right to face him

Bute agreed then to take a break from his contract with the Showtime channel and to accept what may end up being less than half his usual purse in order to travel to England to face Carl Froch, a two-time WBC champion with established credibility.

"In recent years, I've been criticized for only fighting at home but we never got offers to go elsewhere and I had to keep boxing," Bute said. "I decided that this time, I'll make my 10th defence in Nottingham."

== The fight ==
Despite being the overwhelming underdog with bookmakers, critics and fans around the world, Froch dominated the fight to win the IBF Super-Middleweight championship of the world by TKO in round 5 to become a three-time world champion.

== Fight card ==
Confirmed bouts:

- Super Middleweight Championship (United Kingdom) Carl Froch vs. (Romania) Lucian Bute (c)
  - Froch defeats Bute via KO in 5th round.
- Super-Bantamweight Championship (United Kingdom) Carl Frampton vs. (Mexico) Raúl Hirales, Jr.
  - Frampton defeats Hirales via unanimous decision.
- Light Middleweight bout (United Kingdom) Erick Ochieng vs. (United Kingdom) A.A Lowe
  - Ochieng defeats Lowe via unanimous decision.
- Light Welterweight bout (United Kingdom) Mark Loyd vs. (Canada) Pier-Olivier Côté
  - Côté defeats Loyd via KO in 5th round.
- Middleweight bout (United Kingdom) John Ryder vs. (United Kingdom) Luke Robinson
  - Ryder defeats Robinson via decision.
- Middleweight bout (United Kingdom) Ryan Aston vs. (United Kingdom) Paul Samuels
  - Aston defeats Samuels via 5th round.
- Welterweight bout (United Kingdom) Adnan Amar vs. (United Kingdom) Terry Carruthers
  - Carruthers defeats Amar via decision.
- Lightweight bout (United Kingdom) Scott Cardle vs. (Nigeria) Ideh Ockuko
  - Cardle defeats Ockuko via decision.
- Featherweight bout (United Kingdom) Leigh Wood vs. (United Kingdom) Delroy Spencer
- Lightweight bout (United Kingdom) Kieran Farrell vs. (United Kingdom) Jason Nesbitt
  - Farrell defeats Nesbitt via decision.

== International broadcasting ==
Country	Broadcaster
Argentina	Combate Space
Australia	Main Event
Canada	Canal Indigo
Chile	Combate Space
Colombia	Combate Space
Costa Rica	Combate Space
Czech Republic	Sport 1
Denmark	TV 2 Sport
Ecuador	Combate Space
Estonia	Viasat Sport Baltic
Guyana	Combate Space
Hungary	Sport 1
Latvia	Viasat Sport Baltic
Lithuania	Viasat Sport Baltic
Mexico	Combate Space
Norway	Viasat Sport
Panama	Combate Space
Paraguay	Combate Space
Peru	Combate Space
Philippines	AKTV
Poland	Canal+ Sport
Romania	The Money Channel
Slovakia	Sport 1
South Africa	SuperSport
Sweden	TV10
United Kingdom	Sky Sports
United States	Epix
Uruguay	Combate Space
Venezuela	Combate Space

Preceded by vs. Glen Johnson	Lucian Bute's bouts 26 May 2012	Succeeded by vs. Denis Grachev
Preceded by vs. Andre Ward	Carl Froch's bouts 26 May 2012	Succeeded by vs. Yusaf Mack
