= Ambriz (surname) =

Ambriz or Ambríz is a surname. Notable people with the surname include:

- Aris Ambríz (born 1985), Mexican American professional boxer
- Franco Ambriz, playwright and director
- Héctor Ambriz (born 1984), American baseball pitcher
- Ignacio Ambríz (born 1965), Mexican footballer
- Jaime Ambriz (born 1978), American soccer player
- Lourdes Ambriz (1958–2025), Mexican soprano

== See also ==
- Ambriz, a village and municipality in Bengo Province, Angola
- SS Ambriz, a steamship in service 1873-1903
