= James Obede Toney =

Ghanaian boxer

Personal information
- Nickname: Hot Ice
- Nationality: Ghanaian
- Born: 5 August 1980 (age 46) Accra, Ghana
- Height: 5 ft 6 in (168 cm)
- Weight: Middleweight; Super middleweight Light heavyweight Cruiserweight

Boxing career
- Stance: Orthodox

Boxing record
- Total fights: 28
- Wins: 24
- Win by KO: 21
- Losses: 3
- Draws: 1

James Obede "Hot Ice" Toney (born 5 August 1980) is a Ghanaian professional boxer who competed from 2000 to 2010. He held the African middleweight title, World Boxing Council (WBC) International middleweight title, and Commonwealth middleweight title. He also challenged for the World Boxing Council (WBC) International middleweight title against Sergey Tatevosyan, and North American Boxing Federation (NABF) super middleweight title, North American Boxing Association (NABA) super middleweight title, and World Boxing Council (WBC) Continental Americas super middleweight title, against Lucian Bute. His professional fighting weight varied from middleweight to cruiserweight.

== Professional boxing record ==
| 28 fights | 24 wins | 3 losses |
|---|---|---|
| By knockout | 21 | 2 |
| By decision | 3 | 1 |
| Draws | 1 | |

| No. | Result | Record | Opponent | Type | Round, time | Date | Location | Notes |
|---|---|---|---|---|---|---|---|---|
| 28 | Win | 24–3–1 | Edward Brews | TKO | 4 (8) | 11 Sep 2010 | Lebanon House, Accra, Ghana | |
| 27 | Win | 23–3–1 | Daniel Adjei Sowah | TKO | 6 (?) | 16 Aug 2008 | Baba Yara Stadium, Kumasi, Ghana | |
| 26 | Win | 22–3–1 | Mohammed Bameyi | PTS | 8 | 4 Jul 2008 | Plaza Cinema, Mamprobi, Accra, Ghana | |
| 25 | Loss | 21–3–1 | Roman Karmazin | TKO | 4 (10), 2:05 | 6 Jan 2007 | Seminole Hard Rock Hotel & Casino Hollywood, Hollywood, Los Angeles, California, U.S. | |
| 24 | Loss | 21–2–1 | Lucian Bute | TKO | 8 (12), 2:49 | 15 Sep 2006 | Bell Centre, Montreal, Canada | For WBA-NABA, WBC-NABF and WBC Continental Americas super middleweight titles |
| 23 | Win | 21–1–1 | Micky Stackhouse | TKO | 2 (4), 1:40 | 23 Feb 2006 | The Plex, North Charleston, South Carolina, U.S. | |
| 22 | Draw | 20–1–1 | Randy Griffin | SD | 12 | 3 Sep 2005 | Gund Arena, Cleveland, Ohio, U.S. | Retained WBC International middleweight title |
| 21 | Win | 20–1 | Osiris Ayise | KO | 7 (8), 1:12 | 28 Apr 2005 | The Plex, North Charleston, South Carolina, U.S. | |
| 20 | Win | 19–1 | Ahorlu Kodzo | TKO | 3 (?) | 6 Nov 2004 | Metro TV Studios, Accra, Ghana | |
| 19 | Win | 18–1 | Ayitey Powers | UD | 12 | 3 Jul 2004 | Accra Sports Stadium, Accra, Ghana | Won vacant Commonwealth and WBC International middleweight titles |
| 18 | Win | 17–1 | Mohammed Konde | TKO | 4 (?) | 20 Dec 2003 | Opera Cinema, Accra, Ghana | |
| 17 | Win | 16–1 | Ekpenyong Bassey | TKO | 4 (?) | 3 Oct 2003 | Accra, Ghana | |
| 16 | Loss | 15–1 | Sergey Tatevosyan | UD | 12 | 29 May 2003 | Centr na Tulskoy, Moscow, Russia | For vacant WBC International middleweight title |
| 15 | Win | 15–0 | Mojeed Okedara | TKO | 7 (8) | 6 Mar 2003 | Accra Sports Stadium, Accra, Ghana | |
| 14 | Win | 14–0 | Jean Thomas | RTD | 3 (?), 3:00 | 6 Dec 2002 | Globe Cinema, Accra, Ghana | |
| 13 | Win | 13–0 | Philibert Sodjinou | TKO | 3 (10) | 11 May 2002 | Accra Sports Stadium, Accra, Ghana | |
| 12 | Win | 12–0 | Mathurin Sechegbe | TKO | 6 (10), 1:33 | 23 Feb 2002 | Accra Sports Stadium, Accra, Ghana | |
| 11 | Win | 11–0 | Bob Rasheed | TKO | 2 (?) | 19 Jan 2002 | Accra, Ghana | |
| 10 | Win | 10–0 | Vincent Kokpochichi | TKO | 1 (?) | 28 Dec 2001 | Benin | |
| 9 | Win | 9–0 | Basil Osigwe | TKO | 3 (?) | 30 Nov 2001 | Kaneshie Sports Complex, Accra, Ghana | |
| 8 | Win | 8–0 | Sunday King Hammer | KO | 6 (12) | 12 Oct 2001 | Kaneshie Sports Complex, Accra, Ghana | African middleweight title at stake |
| 7 | Win | 7–0 | Sabou Ballogou | UD | 8 | 8 Sep 2001 | Kaneshie Sports Complex, Accra, Ghana | |
| 6 | Win | 6–0 | Khaled Zorkot | TKO | 3 (?), 0:45 | 27 Jul 2001 | Kaneshie Sports Complex, Accra, Ghana | |
| 5 | Win | 5–0 | Golley Ballogou | KO | 2 (?) | 6 Jul 2001 | Kumasi, Ghana | |
| 4 | Win | 4–0 | Ali Mohammed | KO | 2 (6) | 25 May 2001 | Kaneshie Sports Complex, Accra, Ghana | |
| 3 | Win | 3–0 | Anyetei Sowah | KO | 1 (8) | 27 Apr 2001 | Kaneshie Sports Complex, Accra, Ghana | |
| 2 | Win | 2–0 | M'Boum Moulawa | KO | 3 (6) | 26 Jan 2001 | Kaneshie Sports Complex, Accra, Ghana | |
| 1 | Win | 1–0 | Bob Abiro | TKO | 1 (6), 1:40 | 13 Nov 2000 | Kaneshie Sports Complex, Accra, Ghana | |
