= Pier-Olivier =

Pier-Olivier is a masculine given name. Notable people with the name include:

- Pier-Olivier Côté (born 1984), Canadian boxer
- Pier-Olivier Lestage (born 1997), Canadian football lineman
