= Eleventh grade =

Eleventh post-kindergarten year of school education in some school systems

Eleventh grade (also known as 11th Grade, Grade 11, or Junior year) is the eleventh year of formal or compulsory education. It is typically the second or third year of high school. Students in eleventh grade are usually 16-17 years of age.

== Australia ==
In Australia, Year 11 is the twelfth year of education and fifth year of high school education. Although there are slight variations between the states, most students in Year 11 are aged around fifteen, sixteen, or seventeen. In Queensland, Year 11 students are the youngest in the country, as they usually enter at age fifteen.

In New South Wales, Year 11 is the shortest year as it only lasts three whole terms. Students commence Year 12 in Term 4 instead of completing a fourth term of Year 11.

Year 11 is followed by Year 12, the final year of high school.

== Bangladesh ==
In Bangladesh, students get admitted in the 11th grade after passing the Secondary School Certificate (SSC) examinations. Educational institutions offering the 11th–12th grade education are known as colleges. To study in the 11th grade, students must choose one of the three streams. (i.e., science, humanities, business studies.)

== Belgium ==
In Belgium, the 11th grade is called "5e secondaire" in the French-speaking part of the country, "5de middelbaar" in the Dutch-speaking part and "5te sekundäre" in the German-speaking part of Belgium.

== Brazil ==
In Brazil, the eleventh grade is the "segundo ano do ensino médio", meaning "second grade of high school". Students tend to be 16 years old.

== Bulgaria ==
In Bulgaria, the 11th grade is the penultimate year of the high-school (gymnasium) stage. Students tend to be 16–17 years old.

== Canada ==
In Canada, the equivalent is Grade 11. In all provinces and territories except Quebec, a student continues to Grade 12 to complete their high school (or secondary) education. In Quebec, Grade 11 (sec. 5) is the final year of secondary education, followed by CEGEP (college), a pre-university level unique to Quebec.

== Colombia ==
In Colombia, all eleventh-grade students are required to complete a community service internship, known as alfabetización (literacy instruction), which differs from the professional internships required at the university level. These internships typically involve activities such as teaching in schools, assisting in hospitals, or supporting libraries.

Students must take the ICFES national standardized exam, which is required for graduation and admission to higher education. They are also required to present themselves for the Colombian Army draft. However, since most eleventh-grade students are 16–17 years old, the army cannot legally recruit them due to age restrictions. In most cases, participation in the draft process is fulfilled by paying a monetary fee.

== Egypt ==
Among Egyptian students it is called تانية ثانوي (tanya thanawy), which means "the second year of secondary school". In this year, students have the choice to enter either the scientific or literature section. In the scientific section, applied mathematics, biology, chemistry and physics are studied, while in the literature section, history, geography, philosophy and psychology are studied. Both sections study Arabic, foreign languages and mathematics as common subjects between them. After finishing 3 years of secondary school, students can apply to a college depending on their chosen section.

== Finland ==
In Finland there are three years of high school. 11th grade is the second.

== France ==
In France, the equivalent is the Première, which is the penultimate year of Secondary education in France (followed by the Terminale).

== Greece ==
In Greece, the 11th grade is called the second year of lyceum school, high school, or upper secondary school. (Deutera Lykeiou – Δευτέρα Λυκείου) It is the penultimate year of secondary education, but it is not compulsory to attend.

== Hong Kong ==
In Hong Kong, 11th grade is called Form 5. Students attending local schools study four core subjects to prepare for the Hong Kong Diploma of Secondary Education (HKDSE): Chinese language, English language, mathematics, and citizenship and social development.

== India ==
In India, Class 11 is the first year of senior secondary education, as part of the country's 10+2 system of schooling. It follows Class 10, the final year of junior secondary education, and precedes Class 12. Class 11 is offered under multiple education boards in India, including the Central Board of Secondary Education (CBSE), the Council for the Indian School Certificate Examinations (CISCE), and various other state boards of education.

Students entering Class 11 choose one among several academic "streams," which determine the subjects they will study for the rest of their secondary education. The major streams are the Science stream (including Physics, Chemistry, Biology, Mathematics, and Computer Science), the Commerce stream (with subjects such as Accountancy and Economics), and the Humanities/Arts stream (with subjects including History, Political Sciences, Psychology, Sociology, and more). Several state boards and central boards also offer vocational courses focusing on skill development and improving employability.

== Indonesia ==
In Indonesia, after appearing for Class X Boards, students entering Class 11 opt for the programs they want to study for the rest of their secondary education. There are three major programs available, which include: the "science" program, which comprises physics, chemistry and biology; the "social" program, which usually comprises subjects including economy, geography and sociology; and the "literature" program, with subjects such as foreign languages, Indonesian literature, and anthropology.

== Ireland ==
In Ireland, it is the Fifth Year or Cúigú Bhliain of Secondary School. (for 15 to 17-year-olds, as there is an optional year beforehand) In this year, students prepare for their Leaving Certificate.

== Kazakhstan ==
In Kazakhstan, Grade 11 (11‑сынып) is the final year of upper secondary education (жоғары орта білім). Students typically enter at 16–17 years old and complete the State Final Attestation (SFA; Қорытынды аттестаттау) exams to receive a certificate of general secondary education (жалпы орта білім туралы аттестат), which are required for graduation and eligibility for higher education or vocational programs. Upper secondary education allows students to focus on academic tracks (preparing for university) or vocational tracks (preparing for technical professions).

== Lebanon ==
In Lebanon, 11th Grade is also known as grade 11 or premiere. Students are divided into either scientific (which then becomes life science [LS or SV]) or general science (GS or SG) in grade 12, as well as economics (ES or SE) which becomes economics (ES or SE) or humanities (H) in grade 12. The choice of division is done according to grades and sometimes according to what the student wants to do in college. A student can go from scientific to economics later in grade 12, but not the opposite.

== Nepal ==
In Nepal, students complete their Secondary Education Examination (SEE) before entering Grade 11, which is part of higher secondary education (Grades 11 and 12). Students select one of three academic streams:

- Science
- Arts
- Management

Mathematics, social studies, Nepali, and English are compulsory subjects in all streams, although students may choose between mathematics and social studies as one of their electives.

== Israel ==
In Israel, eleventh grade is known as "Yud-Aleph" (11 in Hebrew numerals, י"א). Ages of the students average at around 16-17. Eleventh grade is when Israeli students do their final tests for most of the subjects for their high school diploma (Called "te'udat bagrut", roughly translates to 'diploma of maturity').

It is generally regarded as the most demanding year, as most schools hold final examinations in every subject except English, mathematics, and the student's chosen Megamot electives (one or two specialisation courses, of which at least one is mandatory).

== Palestinian Territories ==
In 11th Grade, ages of the students average at around 16–17. 11th Grade is when Palestinian students do their final tests for most of the subjects for their high school diploma.

Many students regard it as the most demanding year of their schooling. In most schools, final examinations are held in every subject except English, mathematics, and Arabic.

== Malaysia ==
In Malaysia, 11th grade is also known as Form 5. Students at this stage are 17 years old, and it is the fifth and final year of secondary school. At the end of Form 5, students sit for the Sijil Pelajaran Malaysia (SPM), a national standardised examination. Results from the SPM determine students' pathways after secondary school, including Form 6, A-Levels, foundation programmes, diploma courses, or entry into employment.

== Mexico ==
In some parts of Mexico, 11th Grade is the second year of high school. Most students enter this grade at age 16, but some might enter as early as 15 or as late as 17.

== Norway ==
In Norway, the eleventh year of education is the first year of Videregående skole, equivalent to high school. It is not referred to as the 11th Grade, but the first grade of Videregående, or VG1. Although Videregående skole is not compulsory for Norwegians, approximately 93% of people aged 16–18 enroll. There is no upper age limit for starting or finishing Videregående skole, but students cannot enroll earlier than the year they turn 16.

== New Zealand ==
In New Zealand, Year 12 is the equivalent of 11th Grade, with students aged 16 or 17 during the years. It is the fourth year of secondary school and the twelfth year of compulsory education. During Year 12, most students complete Level 2 of the National Certificate of Educational Achievement (NCEA), the country's main national qualification for secondary school students. Students in Year 12 typically study English (or Te Reo Māori) and a minimum of five elective subjects with mathematics highly recommended.

== Pakistan ==
In Pakistan, 11th Grade is the first of the two years in college (12th Grade being the last and final year before university education) and is equivalently referred to as "first year." Students in this year level are, most times, 15 to 16 years old.

Students select from the following programs:

- Pre-medical (biology, physics, chemistry)
- Pre-engineering (math, physics, chemistry)
- Commerce
- Humanities
- Science
- Home economics
- Arts

And the compulsory subjects Urdu, Islamic studies, (1st year only) and Pakistan studies. (2nd year only) The students can select the preferred subject based on SSC results. (9th and 10th grade)

== Philippines ==
In the Philippines, Grade 11 is the first of two-year senior high, and the fifth year of the overall high school curriculum. Being the first year of senior high after junior high, students are required to select a program track and strand. Senior high was implemented since the shift to K–12 curriculum in the school year 2016–17. Students are usually 15 to 17 years old.

Topics discussed to a student depends on the program track and strand selected by the student, which could be one of the following:

- Academic track
  - Accountancy, business and management (ABM)
  - Science, technology, engineering and mathematics (STEM)
  - Humanities and social sciences (HUMSS)
  - General academic strand (GAS)
- Technical-Vocational track
  - Agricultural-fishery arts
  - Home economics
  - Industrial arts
  - Information Communications Technology (ICT)
- Sports track
- Arts and design track

== Russia ==
In Russia, the 11th grade is the final year of secondary education and the conclusion of high school. It is also an examination year, in which preparation for the Unified State Exam (USE) becomes the primary focus. Educational priority in this year is given to reviewing material covered in grades 5 through 10, particularly in mathematics, the Russian language, and the elective examination subjects chosen by each student.

== Singapore ==
In Singapore, 11th grade is the equivalent of Secondary 5.

Only students in the Normal Academic stream proceed to Secondary 5. Students in the Express stream sit their O-Level (Ordinary Level) examinations in Secondary 4, after which they may continue to a Junior College for two years or a Polytechnic for three years.

== Spain ==
In Spain, the closest equivalent to the eleventh grade is the first year of Bachillerato. It is for pupils aged 16 to 17. It is a year of many changes when pupils can choose what they would like to study in the future at university. There are three types of "Bachilleratos":

- Main subjects: Spanish, English, Physical education and philosophy.
- Science: math, physics and chemistry and biology and geology (health-orientated degrees) or technical drawing.
- Humanities/Sociology: Latin and Greek or math oriented for sociology and economy, history and literature.
- Arts: music, drama class, design, history of art.

== Sweden ==
In Sweden, eleventh grade is the first year of Upper Secondary School.

== United Kingdom ==
=== England and Wales ===
Year 12, or Lower Sixth form, is comparable to the 11th grade in the US. It is the sixth and penultimate year of secondary education. During Year 12, students usually take the first half of three or four A-Level or equivalent subjects. Some students take Advanced Subsidiary Level (AS-Level) exams at the end of Year 12.

Students then enter Year 13 (equivalent to 12th grade) continuing to study three or four A-Levels, with most (65.8%) taking three A-Levels at 18. Successful completion generally results in the award of A-Level qualifications, though BTECs can be received.

=== Scotland ===
In Scotland, fifth year of secondary education (S5) is optional. Pupils will generally sit Higher qualifications, which typically form the minimum entry requirements for university admission. S5 is followed by an optional sixth year (S6). Students in this year are normally aged 16 to 17.

=== Northern Ireland ===
The system is similar to the English one at this age. Lower Sixth Form (Year 13) pupils start on a two-year course; at the end of which they will hopefully have gained three 'A' Levels in their chosen subjects.

== United States ==
In the U.S., a student in the eleventh grade is typically referred to as a junior.

The vast majority of students who are classified as juniors take the SAT and/or ACT in the second semester of their third year of high school.

Math students usually take algebra II, but classes like trigonometry or precalculus are sometimes offered for students who wish to take Advanced Placement math classes in their fourth or senior year of high school. Depending on the location, there may be a combination of the listed subjects. They may also take easier courses such as algebra I and geometry if they do not have the required prerequisites for the more advanced courses that are listed above. Students who are advanced in mathematics often take calculus or statistics.

In science classes, third-year students are typically taught biology, physics, or chemistry, with a strong emphasis on laboratory work.

In English class, a college-preparatory curriculum commonly includes American literature. Often, English literature is taught in the third year of high school. Key works may include The Glass Menagerie, The Scarlet Letter, The Crucible, The Great Gatsby, Of Mice and Men, The Adventures of Huckleberry Finn, The Grapes of Wrath, and works by authors like Jonathan Edwards, Amy Tan, and Lorraine Hansberry.

In a social studies curriculum, third-year students in the United States are typically taught US history, often covering the period from the 1870s to the 21st century. These courses may also be taught in ninth or tenth grade. Students may also explore more advanced world culture and geography, as well as other social sciences such as psychology, economics, sociology, and government.

Many high school third-year students in the United States choose to take a foreign language, even though it is not always required in all secondary school curricula.

While normally followed by twelfth grade, some colleges will accept excelling students out of this grade as part of an early college entrance program. Alternatively, some students may choose to graduate early through standardized testing or advanced credits.

== See also ==
- Educational stage
- Ninth grade
- Tenth grade
- Twelfth grade
- Senior secondary education

Preceded by Tenth grade	Eleventh grade age 16–17	Succeeded by Twelfth grade or College (Québec only)
