= Lucian Bute vs. Glen Johnson =

Boxing competition

- Date: 5 November 2011
- Venue: Colisée Pepsi, Quebec City, Quebec, Canada
- Title(s) on the line: IBF Super Middleweight Championship

Tale of the tape
Boxer	(Romania) Lucian Bute	(Jamaica) Glen Johnson
Nickname	"Le Tombeur"	"The Road Warrior"
Hometown	Pechea, Galați, Romania	Clarendon, Middlesex, Jamaica
Pre-fight record	29–0 (24 KO)	51–15–2 (34 KO)
Age	31 years, 8 months	42 years, 10 months
Height	6 ft 1 1/2 in (187 cm)	5 ft 11 in (180 cm)
Weight	167 1/2 lb (76 kg)	166 1/2 lb (76 kg)
Style	Southpaw	Orthodox
Recognition	IBF; Super Middleweight Champion; The Ring; No. 3 Ranked Super Middleweight	IBF; No. 10 Ranked Super Middleweight; The Ring; No. 7 Ranked Super Middleweight

Result
- Bute defeated Johnson via unanimous decision.

Lucian Bute vs. Glen Johnson was a professional boxing match contested on 5 November 2011, for the IBF Super Middleweight championship.

== Background ==
In July, Bute returned to his native Romania, where he had fought once earlier in his career but had dreamed of making a title defence there. He scored a fourth-round knockout against mandatory challenger Jean Paul Mendy.

He had then hoped to match him with former titleholder Mikkel Kessler of Denmark. When Kessler declined the bout—he will instead challenge titlist Robert Stieglitz on Nov. 5 in Denmark. They then turned to former middleweight champion Kelly Pavlik, who said he wanted the fight but he also ended up turning down the bout because he was unhappy with the $1.35 million offer he received from Top Rank to challenge Bute.

Johnson was bumped out of Showtime's Super Six World Boxing Classic semifinals in June when he lost a competitive decision to titleholder Carl Froch. But it was a good enough performance to earn Johnson another title shot.

This bout marked the first time Bute had gone back-to-back fights away from Montreal since 2004.

== The fight ==
Lucian Bute defeated Johnson via unanimous decision.

== Undercard ==
Confirmed bouts:

=== Televised ===
- Super Middleweight Championship (Romania) Lucian Bute (c) vs. (Jamaica) Glen Johnson

Bute defeated Johnson via unanimous decision. (119-109, 120-108, 120-108)

- Super Lightweight bout: (Canada) Pier Olivier Cote vs. (United States) Jorge Teron

Cote defeated Teron via KO at 0:33 of the third round.

=== Preliminary card ===
- Super Bantamweight bout: (Canada) Steve Molitor vs. (Canada) Sebastien Gauthier

Molitor defeated Gauthier via split decision. (96-94, 94-96, 96-94)

- Super Middleweight bout: (United States) Allan Green vs. (Canada) Sébastien Demers

- Welterweight bout: (Canada) Kevin Bizier vs. (Mexico) Ivan Valle

Bizier defeated Valle via KO of the third round.

- Super Featherweight bout: (Cuba) Rances Barthelemy vs. (Dominican Republic) Luis Ernesto Jose

Barthelemy defeated Jose via TKO of the sixth round.

- Light Heavyweight bout: (Canada) Schiller Hyppolite vs. (Canada) Dale Golden

Hyppolite defeated Golden via TKO at 2:28 of the first round.

== International Broadcasting ==
Country / Region	Broadcaster
Canada	Canal Indigo
Hungary	DigiSport
Romania	The Money Channel
United Kingdom	BoxNation
United States	Showtime

Preceded by vs. Jean-Paul Mendy	Lucian Bute's bouts November 5, 2011	Succeeded by vs. Carl Froch
Preceded by vs. Carl Froch	Glen Johnson's bouts November 5, 2011	Succeeded by vs. Andrzej Fonfara
