= Schiller Hyppolite =

Canadian boxer

Personal information
- Nationality: Canadian
- Born: May 23, 1986 (age 40) Haiti
- Height: 183 cm (6 ft 0 in)
- Weight: Super middleweight; Light heavyweight

Boxing career
- Stance: Orthodox

Boxing record
- Total fights: 23
- Wins: 21
- Win by KO: 14
- Losses: 2

Schiller Rudolph Hyppolite (born May 23, 1986) is a Canadian former professional boxer who competed from 2011 to 2016.

== Early life ==
In his youth, Hyppolite practiced several individual and team sports. His behavioral problems meant that he was suspended three times from the basketball team at his high school. At age 16 he practiced kickboxing, but after he injured both legs, he opted for boxing.

== Amateur career ==
Hyppolite has been crowned champion several times in Quebec.

== Professional career ==
Hyppolite's professional career started against Patrick Tessier. This fight was on the Bute vs. Magee undercard. His nickname was Batman. He was allocated after his only defeat against Francy Ntetu.

In December 2014, Hyppolite won the vacant WBC International Silver Light Heavyweight title by referee stoppage. It was against Hungarian Norbert Nemesapati.

== Professional boxing record ==
21 wins (14 knockouts), 2 losses, 0 draws, 0 no contests
Res.	Record	Opponent	Type	Round	Date	Location	Notes
Loss	21-2	(Turkey) Avni Yildirim	TKO	3 (10)	2016-11-05	(Germany) Ballhaus Forum, Munich, Bayern	Lost vacant WBC International Silver Super Middleweight title.
Win	21-1	(Argentina) Pablo Daniel Zamora Nievas	KO	5 (10)	2016-05-13	(Canada) Metropolis, Montréal, Québec	
Win	20-1	(United States) Darnell Boone	UD	10	2016-03-12	(Canada) Olympia, Montréal, Québec	
Win	19-1	(Croatia) Ivan Jukic	KO	1 (10)	2016-02-21	(Canada) Casino du Lac-Leamy, Gatineau, Quebec	
Win	18-1	(French Polynesia) Cedric Bellais	TKO	4 (8)	2015-12-04	(Canada) Métropolis, Montréal, Quebec	
Win	17-1	(Mexico) Victor Manuel Palacios	RTD	2 (8)	2015-11-06	(Canada) Parc de l'Exposition, Trois-Rivières, Quebec	
Win	16-1	(France) Kevin Thomas Cojean	UD	10	2015-06-20	(Canada) Bell Centre, Montreal, Quebec	
Win	15-1	(Argentina) Ricardo Marcelo Ramallo	UD	10	2015-04-17	(Canada) Colisée Cardin, Sorel-Tracy, Quebec	
Win	14-1	(Hungary) Norbert Nemesapati	TKO	11 (12)	2014-12-06	(Canada) Bell Centre, Montreal, Quebec	Won vacant WBC International Silver Light Heavyweight title.
Win	13-1	(Republic of Ireland) JJ McDonagh	UD	10	2014-08-16	(Canada) Pavillon de la Jeunesse, Quebec City, Quebec	
Win	12-1	(Ghana) Mohammed Akrong	RTD	5 (8)	2014-06-13	(Canada) Centre Pierre-Charbonneau, Montreal, Quebec	
Win	11-1	(Uruguay) Rafael Sosa Pintos	KO	1 (10)	2014-05-22	(Canada) Holiday Inn, Pointe-Claire, Quebec	Won WBC FECARBOX Super Middleweight Title.
Win	10-1	(The Bahamas) Jermain Mackey	RTD	6 (10)	2014-03-28	(Canada) Casino du Lac-Leamy, Gatineau, Quebec	
Win	9-1	(Poland) Daniel Urbanski	TKO	3 (8)	2014-02-05	(Canada) New City Gas, Montreal, Quebec	
Win	8-1	(Mexico) Jaudiel Zepeda	TKO	3 (8)	2013-09-06	(Canada) Casino du Lac-Leamy, Gatineau, Quebec	
Win	7-1	(Mexico) Martin Avila	KO	3 (6)	2013-05-17	(Canada) Hilton Lac-Leamy, Gatineau, Quebec	
Win	6-1	(France) Hassene Azouz Neffati	TKO	3 (6)	2013-02-16	(Canada) Hilton Lac-Leamy, Gatineau, Quebec	
Loss	5-1	(Canada) Francy Ntetu	SD	6	2012-11-13	(Canada) Bell Centre, Montreal, Quebec	
Win	5-0	(Latvia) Ruslans Pojonisevs	UD	6	2012-08-17	(Canada) Holiday Inn, Pointe-Claire, Quebec	
Win	4-0	(Hungary) Ferenc Sarkozi	KO	1 (4)	2012-05-19	(Canada) Holiday Inn, Pointe-Claire, Quebec	
Win	3-0	(Canada) Martin Desjardins	UD	4	2012-04-20	(Canada) Bell Centre, Montreal, Quebec	
Win	2-0	(Canada) Dale Golden	KO	1 (4)	2011-11-05	(Canada) Colisée Pepsi, Quebec City, Quebec	
Win	1-0	(Canada) Patrick Tessier	UD	4	2011-03-09	(Canada) Bell Centre, Montreal, Quebec	Professional debut.
