= Pier-Olivier Côté =

Canadian boxer

Personal information
- Nickname: Apou
- Nationality: Canadian
- Born: Pier-Olivier Côté; May 30, 1984 (age 42) Cali, Colombia
- Height: 5 ft 8 in (173 cm)
- Weight: Super Lightweight

Boxing career
- Reach: 69 in (175 cm)
- Stance: Orthodox

Boxing record
- Total fights: 19
- Wins: 19
- Win by KO: 13
- Losses: 0
- Draws: 0

Pier-Olivier Côté (born May 30, 1984) is a Canadian professional boxer. Cote was born in Cali, Colombia, but at 18 months old he was adopted by Réjean Côté and Christiane Pleau of Charlesbourg, Quebec and grew up in the Quebec City suburb. In a relationship with Geneviève Bussières

== Professional career ==
=== Super Lightweight ===
Côté needed only two minutes and fifty seconds to send Michael Lozada to the canvas three times and win his fight at the Bell Centre on March 19, 2011. He was the co-feature of Lucian Bute's defence of his IBF Super-middleweight title against Brian Magee of Ireland.

On Feb 27, 2010 Cote made his U.S debut when took on Willshaun Boxley in Augusta, Georgia. On May 7, 2011 Cote made his second U.S appearance when took on Aris Ambriz in the opening bout of the Showtime coverage of the Manny Pacquiao vs. Shane Mosley event. Cote dominated Ambriz in all rounds. Cote wasn't able to finish the fight in round three but as Cote continued to land punches in the fourth it led to the referee jumping in and calling a halt to the bout.

His next scheduled fight was postponed due to illness. He has been inactive since.

== Professional boxing record ==
19 Wins(13 knockouts, 6 decisions), 0 Losses, 0 Draw(s)
Res.	Record	Opponent	Type	Rd., Time	Date	Location	Notes
Win	19–0	(United Kingdom) Mark Lloyd	TKO	5 (8)	2012-05-26	(United Kingdom) Nottingham Arena, Nottingham, England	
Win	18–0	(United States) Jorge Teron	KO	2 (12), 0:33	2011-11-05	(Canada) Pepsi Coliseum, Quebec City	Won vacant IBF Inter-Continental Light Welterweight title.
Win	17–0	(Mexico) Pedro Navarrete	UD	8	2011-07-09	Romexpo, Bucharest, Romania	
Win	16–0	(United States) Aris Ambríz	TKO	4 (8), 0:46	2011-05-07	(United States) MGM Grand, Las Vegas	
Win	15–0	(Mexico) Michael Lozada	TKO	1 (8), 2:50	2011-03-19	(Canada) Bell Centre, Montreal	
Win	14–0	(Mexico) Cesar Soriano	TKO	1 (8), 0:30	2010-12-18	(Canada) Pepsi Coliseum, Quebec City	
Win	13–0	(Argentina) Walter Sergio Gomez	KO	6 (8), 1:56	2010-10-15	(Canada) Bell Centre, Montreal	
Win	12–0	(Mexico) Hugo Armenta	UD	4 (4)	2010-05-28	(Canada) Pepsi Coliseum, Quebec City	
Win	11–0	(Mexico) Hugo Pacheco	TKO	3 (6), 1:02	2010-04-17	(Canada) Bell Centre, Montreal	
Win	10–0	(United States) Willshaun Boxley	UD	6 (6)	2010-02-27	(United States) Bell Auditorium, Augusta, Georgia	
Win	9–0	(Canada) Jason Hayward	UD	10 (10)	2009-11-28	(Canada) Pepsi Coliseum, Quebec City	
Win	8–0	(Peru) Leonardo Rojas	TKO	1 (6), 1:21	2009-09-25	(Canada) Bell Centre, Montreal	
Win	7–0	(Haiti) Jean Charlemagne	TKO	6 (6), 0:45	2009-06-19	(Canada) Bell Centre, Montreal	
Win	6–0	(Mexico) Luis Acevedo	TKO	2 (6), 2:56	2009-04-04	(Canada) Bell Centre, Montreal	
Win	5–0	(Mexico) Jesus Gutierrez	KO	1 (4), 0:58	2009-03-13	(Canada) Bell Centre, Montreal	
Win	4–0	(Paraguay) Ramon Elizer Esperanza	UD	4 (4)	2008-10-24	(Canada) Bell Centre, Montreal	
Win	3–0	(Argentina) Juan Carlos Pastrana	TKO	2 (4), 2:45	2008-07-08	(Canada) Salle de spectacle l'Étoile, Brossard, Quebec	
Win	2–0	(The Bahamas) Damian Tinker	UD	4 (4)	2008-04-25	(Canada) Arena de Repentigny, Repentigny, Quebec	
Win	1–0	(Canada) Martin Huppe	KO	3 (4), 1:50	2008-02-29	(Canada) Bell Centre, Montreal	

== Titles in boxing ==
Minor Sanctioning Bodies:

- IBF Inter-Continental Light Welterweight World Champion (140 lbs)
- Canada Super Featherweight National Champion (130 lbs)
