= Manny Pacquiao vs. Shane Mosley =

2011 boxing match

The Undaunted
- Date: May 7, 2011
- Venue: MGM Grand, Paradise, Nevada, U.S.
- Title(s) on the line: WBO welterweight title

Tale of the tape
Boxer	Manny Pacquiao	Shane Mosley
Nickname	Pac-Man	Sugar
Hometown	General Santos, Soccsksargen, Philippines	Pomona, California, U.S.
Purse	$20,000,000	$5,000,000
Pre-fight record	52–3–2 (38 KO)	46–6–1 (1) (39 KO)
Age	32 years, 4 months	39 years, 8 months
Height	5 ft 5 1/2 in (166 cm)	5 ft 8 1/2 in (174 cm)
Weight	145 lb (66 kg)	147 lb (67 kg)
Style	Southpaw	Orthodox
Recognition	WBO; Welterweight Champion; The Ring; No. 1 Ranked Welterweight; The Ring No. 1 ranked pound-for-pound fighter 8-division world champion	WBO/The Ring; No. 3 Ranked Welterweight; 3-division world champion

Result
- Pacquiao wins via 12-round unanimous decision (119-108, 120-108, 120-107)

Manny Pacquiao vs. Shane Mosley, billed as The Undaunted, was a professional boxing match contested on May 7, 2011, for the WBO welterweight championship.

== Background ==
The bout was held at MGM Grand, in Las Vegas. Pacquiao won by unanimous decision and retained his WBO welterweight championship. The fight was Manny Pacquiao's first PPV fight on Showtime boxing.

=== Promotion ===
Top Rank promoted the fight, which took place at the MGM Grand in Las Vegas. Pacquiao's team turned down a fight with Mosley twice a year before, but they accepted the fight after Mosley had a lopsided loss to Floyd Mayweather Jr. and a draw to Sergio Mora. A Showtime series, Fight Camp 360°, documented Pacquiao's and Mosley's training preparations in the lead up to their bout. Shane Mosley stated that if he lost badly to Pacquiao he may retire. Pacquiao was heavily favored to win, as many fans and critics believed the 39-year-old Mosley was past his prime. Pacquiao's promoter Bob Arum stated that should Pacquiao win, it could set up a third fight with Juan Manuel Marquez in November.

=== National Anthem singers ===
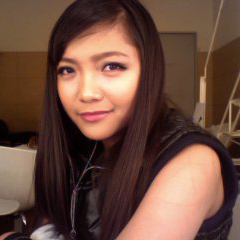
Charice sings Lupang Hinirang for the Philippines National Anthem.

- Philippines (Lupang Hinirang) – Charice
- United States (The Star-Spangled Banner) – Tyrese Gibson
- United States (America the Beautiful) – Jamie Foxx

=== Entrance performers ===
In addition, rapper LL Cool J performed as Mosley entered the arena, while vocalist Jimi Jamison of the rock band Survivor sang "Eye of the Tiger" as Pacquiao approached the ring.

=== Referee and judges ===
The referee for the fight was Kenny Bayless, and the judges were Nevadans Duane Ford, Dave Moretti, and Glen Trowbridge. Bayless had previously been referee for fights involving Pacquiao and Mosley before, including the Floyd Mayweather Jr. vs. Shane Mosley and Manny Pacquiao vs. Miguel Cotto fights.

== The fight ==
In the third round, Pacquiao knocked Mosley down, using a one-two capped with a left straight. Mosley was left dazed by the knockdown but managed to stand up. From that point on, Mosley backpedaled and seemed very reluctant to engage Pacquiao, throwing few combinations, trying to potshot with occasional counter right hands, and looking for one big punch. Mosley floored Pacquiao in the tenth round with a push, but referee Kenny Bayless ruled it a knockdown. None of the judges seemed to have agreed with this view, judging from the scores. Replays showed that Pacquiao was throwing a punch off balance, slipped and went down with a little help from Mosley's right hand and with his right foot trapped under Mosley's left foot. Bayless apologized for this mistake to Roach, Pacquiao's coach, after the fight. Pacquiao gained one-sided verdicts from all three judges – 119–108, 120–108 and 120–107.

== Aftermath ==
Pacquiao reported that he had a cramp in his legs. Freddie Roach said that Pacquiao had problems with cramping before, but usually only in training sessions and not in the middle of bouts.

== Main card ==
Confirmed bouts:

- Welterweight Championship (Philippines) Manny Pacquiao vs. (United States) Shane Mosley

Pacquiao defeated Mosley via unanimous decision (119–108, 120–108, 120–107).

- Super Bantamweight Championship bout: (Mexico) Jorge Arce vs. (Puerto Rico) Wilfredo Vázquez, Jr.

Arce defeated Vázquez via technical knockout at 0:55 in the twelfth round.

- Super Middleweight bout: (United States) Alfonso López III vs. (United States) Kelly Pavlik

Pavlik defeated López via majority decision (95–95, 98–92, 99–91).

- Light Welterweight bout: (United States) Mike Alvarado vs. (Ghana) Raymond Narh

Alvarado defeated Narh via technical knockout at 3:00 in the third round.

=== Preliminary card ===
- Light Welterweight bout: (United States) José Benavidez vs. (United States) James Hope

Benavidez defeated Hope via technical knockout at 1:43 in the fifth round.

- Lightweight bout: (United States) Aris Ambríz vs. (Canada) Pier-Olivier Côté

Cote defeated Ambríz via technical knockout at 0:46 in the fourth round.

- Super Flyweight bout: (Mexico) Javier Gallo vs. (Philippines) Rodel Mayol

Mayol defeated Gallo via majority decision (95–95, 98–92, 98–92).

- Light Welterweight bout: (United States) Karl Dargan vs. (United States) Randy Arrellin

Dargan defeated Arrellin via unanimous decision (60–54, 60–54, 59–55).

== Reported fight earnings ==
The fight generated 1.3 million PPV buys. These are the payouts to the fighters as reported to the executive director of the Nevada State Athletic Commission Keith Kizer. These are the official purses as per the Nevada bout agreements, It does not include sponsor money or other common forms of revenue paid through other streams. Pacquiao's official purse on the Nevada contract is six million, Top Rank has guaranteed Manny twenty million, because of PPV. According to fight promoter Bob Arum, Manny Pacquiao may earn US$30 million. Mosley's official purse on the Nevada contract is $3.95 million but he is guaranteed five million.

- Manny Pacquiao $20,000,000 vs. Shane Mosley ($3,950,100)
- Jorge Arce $125,000 vs. Wilfredo Vázquez, Jr. ($165,000)
- Alfonso López III $40,000 vs. Kelly Pavlik ($270,000)
- Mike Alvarado $50,000 vs. Raymond Narh ($22,000)

== International broadcasting ==
Country	Broadcaster
Australia	Main Event
China	CCTV-5
Czech Republic	Sport 1
Hungary	Sport 2
Indonesia	tvOne
Italy	Sportitalia
Japan	WOWOW
Malaysia	Astro Box Office Sport 971
Mexico	TV Azteca
New Zealand	Sky Arena
Philippines	Solar Sports (Pay, live)
Philippines	GMA Network and TV5(Terrestrial, delayed)
Poland	Polsat Sport Extra
Qatar	Al Jazeera Sports 1
Romania	Digi Sport
Russia	NTV Plus Sport
Slovakia	Sport 1
South Africa	SuperSport 2
Spain	Marca TV
Thailand	Channel 7
United Kingdom	Sky Sports 1
United States	Showtime PPV
United States	US Military via AFN Sports
Venezuela	Meridiano

Preceded by vs. Antonio Margarito	Manny Pacquiao's bouts 7 May 2011	Succeeded by vs. Juan Manuel Marquez III
Preceded by vs. Sergio Mora	Shane Mosley's bouts 7 May 2011	Succeeded by vs. Canelo Álvarez
