= Carl Froch vs. Glen Johnson =

Boxing competition

- Date: June 4, 2011
- Venue: Boardwalk Hall, Atlantic City, New Jersey, U.S.
- Title(s) on the line: WBC super middleweight championship

Tale of the tape
| Boxer | (United Kingdom) Carl Froch | (Jamaica) Glen Johnson |
| Nickname | "The Cobra" | "Road Warrior" |
| Hometown | Nottingham, East Midlands, UK | Clarendon, Middlesex, Jamaica |
| Pre-fight record | 27–1 (20 KO) | 51–14–2 (35 KO) |
| Age | 33 years, 11 months | 42 years, 5 months |
| Height | 6 ft 1 in (185 cm) | 5 ft 11 in (180 cm) |
| Weight | 167 1/2 lb (76 kg) | 166 1/2 lb (76 kg) |
| Style | Orthodox | Orthodox |
| Recognition | WBC; Super Middleweight Champion; The Ring; No. 3 Ranked Super Middleweight | WBC; No. 2 Ranked Super Middleweight; The Ring; No. 7 Ranked Super Middleweight; Former Light heavyweight champion |

Result
- Froch defeated Johnson via majority decision

Carl Froch vs. Glen Johnson was a professional boxing match contested on June 4, 2011, for the WBC super middleweight championship. The winner of the bout went on to the Finals of the Super Six World Boxing Classic and face WBA Champion Andre Ward, after his decision win over Arthur Abraham in May 2011. It was held at Boardwalk Hall, in Atlantic City, New Jersey, United States, and televised on Showtime.

== Background ==
Froch defeated Andre Dirrell by split decision in a WBC super-middleweight title defense. In his second bout of the Super Six, the contestant was Danish boxer Mikkel Kessler. Kessler prevailed via a unanimous decision. After the loss, Froch's next fight would be against rugged fighter Arthur Abraham. He regained his WBC Title, claiming a unanimous point victory over Abraham in Helsinki, Finland.

Former light heavyweight champion Johnson joined the Super Six World Boxing Classic when he replaced the injured Mikkel Kessler. Johnson, 41, has not fought at super middleweight since 2000, but dropped down to the 168-pound weight class to face, and beat, Allan Green in a Group Stage 3 bout on November 6 to advance to Semi Finals and gain 3 points for the knockout. The fight took place at the MGM Grand in Las Vegas on the undercard of the Juan Manuel Lopez vs. Rafael Marquez Featherweight title fight.

Froch spent three hours in a US hospital in the week before the bout receiving treatment for a blocked left eardrum.

== The fight ==
Froch retained his title with a majority decision victory, with the judges' scorecards reading 117–111, 116–112, and 114–114.

== Aftermath ==
Froch was due to face Ward in Atlantic City on October 29 in the final of the Super Six, but an injury to Ward required the rescheduling of the bout to December 17, 2011.

== Fight Card ==
Confirmed bouts:

=== Televised bout ===
- Super Middleweight Championship bout: (United Kingdom) Carl Froch vs. (Jamaica) Glen Johnson

Froch defeated Johnson via majority decision (116-112, 117-111, 114-114).

=== Untelevised bouts ===
- Light Heavyweight bout: (Colombia) Edison Miranda vs. (United States) Rayco Saunders

Miranda defeated Saunders via unanimous decision (80-73, 79-73, 79-73).

- Light Heavyweight bout: (Hungary) Zsolt Erdei vs. (United States) Byron Mitchell

Erdei defeated Mitchell via technical knockout at 1:58 in the sixth round.

- Light Welterweight bout: (Ukraine) Ivan Redkach vs. (Puerto Rico) Alberto Amaro

Redkach defeated Amaro via technical knockout at 1:46 in the sixth round.

- Light Heavyweight bout: (Sweden) Badou Jack vs. (United States) Hajro Sujak

Jack defeated Sujak via technical knockout in the fifth round.

- Middleweight bout: (United States) J'Leon Love vs. (United States) Lamar Harris

Love defeated Harris via unanimous decision (40-35, 40-35, 40-35).

== Broadcasting ==
As part of their television broadcast, Showtime featured former super middleweight champion and former Super Six participant Mikkel Kessler in a comeback bout against Mehdi Bouadla. Kessler won by way of TKO in the sixth round, ending a 14-month layoff. The bout was for the vacant WBO European super middleweight title.

| Country | Broadcaster |
|---|---|
| Hungary | Sport 2 |
| United Kingdom | Sky Sports |
| United States | Showtime |

| Preceded by vs. Arthur Abraham | Carl Froch's bouts 4 June 2011 | Succeeded by vs. Andre Ward |
| Preceded by vs. Allan Green | Glen Johnson's bouts 4 June 2011 | Succeeded by vs. Lucian Bute |
