= Costică Silion =

Romanian general (born 1955)

General Costică Silion (born 29 September 1955 in Pechea) is a Romanian general. Between March 2005 and December 2009 he was the chief (General Inspector) of the Romanian Gendarmerie.
