= Sergey Tatevosyan =

Russian boxer (born 1973)

Personal information
- Nationality: Russian
- Born: 4 January 1973 (age 53) Novosibirsk, Russia
- Height: 1.78 m (5 ft 10 in)
- Weight: Light middleweight; Middleweight; Super middleweight

Boxing career
- Stance: Southpaw

Boxing record
- Total fights: 34
- Wins: 26
- Win by KO: 14
- Losses: 8
- Draws: 0

Sergey Tatevosyan (born 4 January 1973) is a Russian former professional boxer who competed from 2000 to 2007.

== Professional career ==
Tatevosyan made his professional debut on 29 January 2000, when he beat countryman Alexander Komarov on technical knockout in the fourth round. On 24 June 2000, he won for the first time the Russia middleweight title to Nikolay Talalakin. In 2003, he won vacant WBC International middleweight title by unanimous decision against Ghanaian boxer James Obede Toney.

Tatevosyan fought Lucian Bute on 26 January 2007 in Montreal for WBO Inter-Continental super middleweight title. He lost fight by unanimous decision 120-108, 119-109, 119-109 at the Bell Centre.

== Professional boxing record ==
34 fights	26 wins	8 losses
By knockout	14	1
By decision	12	7

No.	Result	Record	Opponent	Type	Round, time	Date	Location	Notes
34	Loss	26-8	(United Kingdom) Carl Froch	TKO	2 (12)	23 Mar 2007	(United Kingdom) Nottingham Arena, Nottingham, England	
33	Loss	26-7	(Romania) Lucian Bute	UD	12	26 Jan 2007	Bell Centre, Montreal, Quebec, Canada	For WBO Inter-Continental super middleweight title
32	Win	26-6	(Denmark) Rudy Markussen	KO	7 (8)	14 Oct 2006	Parken Stadium, Copenhagen, Denmark	
31	Loss	25-6	(Russia) Dmitry Pirog	UD	10	16 Apr 2006	Casino Crystall, Moscow, Russia	For Russia middleweight title
30	Win	25-5	(Russia) Ruslan Semenov	UD	6	26 Jul 2005	KRC Arbat, Moscow, Russia	
29	Win	24-5	(Russia) David Gogiya	SD	10	28 Apr 2005	USC Soviet Wings, Moscow, Russia	Retained Russia super middleweight title
28	Win	23-5	(Russia) Viktor Geraschenko	UD	10	17 Dec 2004	Vodoley, Ekaterinburg, Russia	Won Russia super middleweight title
27	Win	22-5	(Belgium) Kanstantsin Makhankou	UD	8	17 Jun 2004	(Belgium) Entertainmt Center Aurora, Vitebsk, Belarus	
26	Loss	21-5	(Armenia) Khoren Gevor	UD	8	18 May 2003	Hanshalle, Lübeck, Germany	
25	Loss	21-4	(Guyana) Howard Eastman	UD	12	30 Jan 2004	(United Kingdom) Goresbrook Leisure Centre, Essex, England	For EBU European title
24	Win	21-3	(Belgium) Yuri Tsarenk	UD	12	8 Oct 2003	Luzhniki, Moscow, Russia	Retained WBC International middleweight title
23	Win	20-3	(Russia) Viktor Geraschenko	UD	8	7 Sep 2003	Krasnoyarsk, Russia	
22	Win	19-3	(Ghana) James Obede Toney	UD	12	29 May 2003	Centr na Tulskoy, Moscow, Russia	Won vacant WBC International middleweight title
21	Win	18-3	(Russia) Ruslan Yakupov	UD	6	19 Apr 2003	Circus, Saint Petersburg, Russia	
20	Win	17-3	(Kazakhstan) Bekzhan Altynbekov	TKO	3 (8)	6 Nov 2002	Novosibirsk, Russia	
19	Win	16-3	(Sweden) Armand Krajnc	TKO	7 (10)	14 Sep 2002	Volkswagen Halle, Braunschweig, Germany	
18	Win	15-3	(Russia) Dmitry Treskov	TKO	4 (6)	31 Aug 2002	Novosibirsk, Russia	
17	Win	14-3	(Ukraine) Oleksandr Harashchenko	UD	10	15 Jun 2002	Druzhba Arena, Donetsk, Ukraine	
16	Win	13-3	(Russia) Dmitry Treskov	TKO	6 (8)	25 May 2002	Kamyshlov, Russia	
15	Loss	12-3	(Russia) Roman Karmazin	UD	8	10 Apr 2002	Conti Casino, St. Petersburg, Russia	
14	Loss	12-2	(Russia) Aslanbek Kodzoev	SD	10	16 Feb 2002	Ice Palace, Novosibirsk, Russia	For vacant Russia middleweight title
13	Win	12-1	(Belarus) Aliaksandr Syrovatka	TKO	6 (8)	11 Dec 2001	Ice Palace, Novosibirsk, Russia	
12	Win	11-1	(Russia) Vage Kocharyan	UD	8	10 Nov 2001	Ice Palace, Novosibirsk, Russia	
11	Win	10-1	(Russia) Askhab Nigaev	TKO	3 (6)	16 Oct 2001	Radio GaGa Club, Moscow, Russia	
10	Win	9-1	(Uzbekistan) Karim Tulaganov	UD	6	30 Jun 2001	Ice Palace, Novosibirsk, Russia	
9	Win	8-1	(Russia) Anatoly Kanaev	KO	1 (8)	26 May 2001	Ice Palace, Tyumen, Russia	
8	Win	7-1	(Uzbekistan) Karim Tulaganov	TKO	2 (8)	6 Apr 2001	Ice Palace, Novosibirsk, Russia	
7	Win	6-1	(Russia) Roman Babaev	RTD	8 (10)	2 Feb 2001	Ice Palace, Novosibirsk, Russia	
6	Loss	5-1	(Belgium) Lansana Diallo	SD	12	25 Dec 2000	Sporthall, Izegem, Belgium	Lost IBF Inter-Continental middleweight title
5	Win	5-0	(Dominican Republic) Alejandro De Leon	TKO	9 (12)	13 Oct 2000	Novosibirsk, Russia	Won vacant IBF Inter-Continental middleweight title
4	Win	4-0	(Russia) Nikolay Talalakin	TKO	2 (12)	24 Jun 2000	Novosibirsk, Russia	Won vacant Russia middleweight title
3	Win	3-0	(Russia) Alexey Ustyantsev	UD	8	30 Apr 2000	Novosibirsk, Russia	
2	Win	2-0	(Russia) Ruslan Dzhanbekov	TKO	5 (6)	10 Mar 2000	Novosibirsk, Russia	
1	Win	1-0	(Russia) Alexander Komarov	TKO	4 (?)	29 Jan 2000	Novosibirsk, Russia	
