= Steluța Luca =

Romanian handball player (born 1975)

Personal information
- Full name: Steluța Lazar
- Born: 20 April 1975 (age 51) Pechea, România
- Height: 1.78 m (5 ft 10 in)

Sport
- Sport: Handball
- Position: Right-back
- Current club: Retired

Youth career
- Years: Team
- 1989–1992: CSȘ Galați

Senior clubs
- Years: Team
- 1992–1993: HC Textila Zalău
- 1993–2002: CS Oltchim Rm. Vâlcea
- 2002–2003: Dossobuono Verona
- 2003–2004: Randers HK
- 2004–2006: FCK Handball
- 2006–2011: CS Oltchim Râmnicu Vâlcea
National team
Years	Team	Apps	(Gls)
–	Romania	223	(1013)
Medal record
IHF Junior World Championship
Gold medal – first place	1995 Brazil	Team
World Championship
Silver medal – second place	2005 Russia	Team
- Updated on 23 June 2011

Steluța Luca (née Lazăr, born 20 April 1975 in Pechea) is a former Romanian international handball player and current coach. She competed in the women's tournament at the 2000 Summer Olympics.

== International honours ==
- EHF Champions League:
  - Finalist: 2010
  - Semifinalist: 2009
- EHF Champions Trophy:
  - Winner: 2007
- EHF Cup Winners' Cup:
  - Winner: 2007
  - Finalist: 2002
- World Championship:
  - Silver Medallist: 2005
  - Fourth Place: 2007

== Personal life ==
She is cousin with boxer Lucian Bute. Both of them were born in Pechea, Galați County.

== See also ==
- List of women's handballers with 1000 or more international goals
