= Azumah Nelson Sports Complex =

Sports Stadium

- Interactive map of Azumah Nelson Sports Complex
- Full name: Azumah Nelson Sports Complex
- Former names: Kaneshie Sports Complex
- Location: Accra, Ghana
- Coordinates: 5.5751596°N 0.2254343°W
- Owner: National Sports Council
- Capacity: 10,000

Construction
- Built: 1970s
- Renovated: 2007

Azumah Nelson Sports Complex, also known as Kaneshie Sports Complex, is a multi-use stadium in Accra, Ghana. The stadium was originally built during the era of the Supreme Military Council under General Acheampong in the 1970s. It was used mostly for football matches, on club level by Accra Hearts of Oak SC and Great Olympics of the Ghana Premier League while the Ohene Djan Stadium was being re-built in 2007. The stadium has a capacity of 10,000 spectators. It is named after Azumah Nelson.

== Overview ==
Azumah Nelson Sports Complex was initially called the "Kaneshie Sports Complex, has been a recreational facility for schools and students in Accra and beyond." Secondary and Primary Schools make use of the sports complex due to the capacity of attendance, besides, it is believed to be among the big sporting centres often used for inter-school sporting competitions and other activities in Accra, Ghana. The reconstruction of Azumah Nelson Sports Complex was carried out by the company called: "New Case Construction Limited." The reconstruction was supposed to be completed in July 2020 but the outbreak of COVID-19 Pandemic has made it uncompleted.

Aside that, the complex also exist to serve as facility as a Youth Resource Centre after it was renovated, facilities including a swimming pool, a standard football pitch, basketball court, running tracks, a tennis court as well as an ICT centre, counselling centre and an entrepreneurship centre were added to the renovated complex.

== See also ==
- Ghana national theatre
- Accra Sports Stadium disaster
- Accra Sports Stadium
- Accra International Conference Center
