= Ismail Sillakh =

Ukrainian boxer

Personal information
- Nationality: (Ukraine) Ukrainian
- Born: Ісмаїл Сіллах; February 9, 1985 (age 41) Zaporizhia, Ukrainian SSR
- Height: 6 ft 1 in (1.85 m)
- Weight: Light Heavyweight; Cruiserweight

Boxing career
- Stance: Orthodox

Boxing record
- Total fights: 34
- Wins: 27
- Win by KO: 21
- Losses: 7
- Draws: 0
- No contests: 0

Ismail Sillakh
Medal record

Men's Boxing

Representing Ukraine

World Amateur Championships
Silver medal – second place	2005 Mianyang	Middleweight

European Amateur Championships
Silver medal – second place	2006 Plovdiv	Light Heavyweight

European Olympic Qualifying
Gold medal – first place	2008 Roseto degli Abruzzi–Pescara	Light Heavyweight

Ismail Sillakh (born February 9, 1985, in Zaporizhia) is a Ukrainian professional boxer who has medaled in important international tournaments as an amateur.

== Amateur career ==
Ismail Sillakh was born in Zaporizhia, then he moved with his family to Industrial city of Mariupol (one of the most important port cities in Ukraine) His parents — Mohammad of Sierra Leone and Natalya, a Ukraine native—met in college and had no particular connection to boxing but he took up the sport at a local recreation center at age seven and quickly discovered that he had the athletic ability to excel at it. In Mariupol he went to the boxing club of City's Metal Construction Factory of the name of Lenin. He was trained by one of the best city's boxing coaches. In Ismayl's career has played big role his old brother Adjick Sillakh. Adjick Sillakh was for years one of the best masters in Ukrainian amateur boxing, Ismayl gained good experience by boxing with his older brother Adjick. He began competing at age nine and was recognized as one of Ukraine’s better amateurs a few years later before establishing himself as one of Europe’s premier open-class boxers. Ismayl Sillakh had been a world-ranked amateur for two years going into the 2007 World Amateur Boxing Championships in Chicago where he lost a close and spirited slug-fest to the more mature Christopher Downs.

=== Amateur highlights ===
Amateur Record: 302-16

2001 (October 11–21) Gold Medalist World Cadet Championships in Baku, Azerbaijan, boxing as a Welterweight (67 kg):

- Round of 16 - Defeated Robert Blazo (Slovakia)
- Quarterfinal - Defeated Rodriguez (Cuba)
- Semifinal - Defeated Artur Beterbiyev (Russia)
- Final - Defeated Elchin Alizade (Azerbaijan)

2005 (November 13–20) Silver Medalist World Championships in Mianyang, China, boxing as a Middleweight (75 kg):

- Round of 32 - Defeated Nabil Kassel (Algeria) RSCI
- Round of 16 - Defeated Donatas Bondorovas (Lithuania) RSCI 1
- Quarterfinal - Defeated Mamadou Diambang (France) RSCO
- Semifinal - Defeated Mohamed Hikal (Egypt) 28-22
- Final - Lost to Matvey Korobov (Russia) RSCO 2

2006 (July 14–23) Silver Medalist European Championships in Plovdiv, Bulgaria, boxing as a Light-Heavyweight (81 kg):

- Round of 32 - Defeated David Tsiklauri (Georgia) RSC 1
- Round of 16 - Defeated Andrey Miruk (Belarus) RSCO 2
- Quarterfinal - Defeated Imre Szello (Hungary) RSCI 1
- Semifinal - Defeated Constantin Bejenaru (Romania) RSCO 3
- Final - Lost to Artur Beterbiyev (Russia) 23-34

== Pro ==
As a pro he is managed by Ivaylo Gotzev and trained by Shadeed Suluki. In 2010 he KOd Daniel Judah for his first minor title (NABF), in 2011 he beat the undefeated Cuban Yordanis Despaigne by unanimous decision. After 17 wins he suffered a setback against undefeated but unsung Denis Grachev, after scoring a knockdown he got careless in the 8th round and Grachev knocked him out, Sillakh's chin looked somewhat suspect. He has won four comeback bouts to go to 21-1, but was knocked out by Sergey Kovalev in the second round of their title bout, leaving Sillakh with two career losses.

== Professional boxing record ==
27 Wins (21 Knockouts), 7 Losses, 0 Draws
Res.	Record	Opponent	Type	Rd., Time	Date	Location	Notes
Loss	25–6	(Poland) Andrzej Fonfara	TKO	6 (10), 2:14	2018-06-16	Torwar Sport Hall, Warsaw, Poland	
Loss	25–5	(Russia) Aleksei Papin	KO	1 (10), 2:07	2017-11-27	Luzhniki, Moscow, Russia	
Loss	25–4	(Poland) Mateusz Masternak	UD	10	2017-06-24	Ergo Arena, Gdańsk, Poland	
Win	23-2	(Georgia (country)) Giorgi Tevdorashvili	TKO	1 (8), 2:17	2015-10-31	Circus, Kryvyi Rih, Ukraine	
Win	22-2	(Latvia) Arturs Kulikauskis	UD	8	2015-06-13	Budivelnik, Cherkasy, Ukraine	
Loss	21-2	(Russia) Sergey Kovalev	KO	2 (12) 2:12	2013-11-30	Colisée Pepsi, Quebec City, Quebec, Canada	For WBO light heavyweight title
Win	21-1	(Russia) Konstantin Piternov	RTD	6 (10), 3:00	2013-08-24	Donbass Arena, Donetsk, Ukraine	
Win	20-1	(Mexico) Alvaro Enriquez	KO	1 (8), 1:58	2013-06-28	(United States) Quiet Cannon, Montebello, California, U.S.	
Win	19-1	(United States) Mitch Williams	UD	10	2013-03-30	(United States) Westin Bonaventure Hotel, Los Angeles, California, U.S.	
Win	18-1	(Ghana) Daniel Adotey Allotey	KO	2 (10), 2:06	2013-02-23	(United States) Quiet Cannon, Montebello, California, U.S.	
Loss	17-1	(Russia) Denis Grachev	TKO	8 (10), 2:18	2012-04-27	(United States) Frank Erwin Center, Austin, Texas, U.S.	Lost NABF light heavyweight title
Win	17-0	(Azerbaijan) Ali Ismailov	TKO	4 (10), 2:06	2011-11-04	Khodynka Ice Palace, Moscow, Russia	
Win	16-0	(Sweden) Hamza Wandera	TKO	3 (10), 2:03	2011-05-21	Sport Complex Krylatskoe, Moscow, Russia	
Win	15-0	(Cuba) Yordanis Despaigne	UD	10	2011-03-04	(United States) Jostens Center, Lake Buena Vista, Florida, U.S.	Retained NABF light heavyweight title
Win	14-0	(United States) Rayco Saunders	UD	10	2010-12-17	(United States) Monroeville Convention Center, Monroeville, Pennsylvania, U.S.	
Win	13-0	(Latvia) Jevgenijs Andrejevs	TKO	5 (8)	2010-10-09	National Palace of Culture, Sofia, Bulgaria	
Win	12-0	(United States) Daniel Judah	TKO	2 (10), 0:49	2010-04-03	(United States) Mandalay Bay Resort & Casino, Paradise, Nevada, U.S.	Won vacant NABF light heavyweight title
Win	11-0	(United States) Larry Pryor	TKO	4 (6), 0:47	2010-02-06	(United States) Prudential Center, Newark, New Jersey, U.S.	
Win	10-0	(United States) Julius Jackson	TKO	1 (6), 1:27	2010-01-16	(United States) Hard Rock Hotel and Casino, Paradise, Nevada, U.S.	
Win	9-0	(United States) Ray Smith	TKO	2 (6), 1:55	2009-08-15	(United States) Hard Rock Hotel and Casino, Paradise, Nevada, U.S.	
Win	8-0	(Canada) David Whittom	TKO	6 (6), 2:25	2009-05-09	(United States) Hard Rock Hotel and Casino, Paradise, Nevada, U.S.	
Win	7-0	(United States) Carlos Reyes	TKO	3 (6), 1:42	2009-03-27	(United States) Nokia Theater, Los Angeles, California, U.S.	
Win	6-0	(Mexico) Jose Humberto Corral	TKO	2 (4), 1:13	2008-12-20	(United States) Hollywood Park Casino, Inglewood, California, U.S.	
Win	5-0	(United States) Dewayne Warren	TKO	1 (6), 0:54	2008-11-07	(United States) Cicero Stadium, Cicero, Illinois, U.S.	
Win	4-0	(Georgia (country)) Armen Azizian	UD	6	2008-10-11	O2 World Arena, Berlin, Germany	
Win	3-0	(United States) Walter Edwards	TKO	1 (4)	2008-08-15	(United States) Ibiza Nightclub, Washington, D.C., U.S.	
Win	2-0	(United States) Jose Grace	KO	1 (4), 1:01	2008-07-24	(United States) 4th and B, San Diego, California, U.S.	
Win	1-0	(United States) Matt Halvorsen	KO	1 (4), 1:18	2008-07-18	(United States) Buffalo Bill's, Primm, Nevada, U.S.	
