= Denis Grachev (fighter) =

Russian boxer and mixed martial arts fighter

- Born: Denis Alexandrovich Grachev; August 3, 1982 (age 44); Chaykovsky, Perm Oblast, Russian SFSR, Soviet Union
- Native name: Денис Грачев
- Other names: Drago's Son; The Pirate
- Nationality: Russian
- Height: 6 ft 1 in (185 cm)
- Division: Light Heavyweight (boxing); Light Cruiserweight (kickboxing); Welterweight (mixed martial arts)
- Reach: 175 cm (68.9 in)
- Style: Kickboxing, boxing
- Stance: Orthodox
- Fighting out of: San Diego, California, U.S.
- Team: City Boxing
- Trainer: Vernon Lee; Manny Melchor
- Rank: International Master of Sport in Kickboxing
- Years active: 1997–2014

Professional boxing record
- Total: 38
- Wins: 20
- By knockout: 11
- Losses: 17
- By knockout: 3
- Draws: 1

Kickboxing record
- Total: 20
- Wins: 17
- By knockout: 7
- Losses: 3

Mixed martial arts record
- Total: 4
- Wins: 3
- By knockout: 1
- By submission: 2
- Losses: 1
- By decision: 1

Other information
- Occupation: Kickboxing Instructor
- Spouse: Marika
- Children: 1
- Notable schools: San Diego City College; Chaykovsky State Institute of Physical Culture
- Boxing record from BoxRec
- Mixed martial arts record from Sherdog

Denis Grachev
Medal record

Representing Russia

Men's Kickboxing

World Championships
Gold medal – first place	2005 Szeged	-81 kg (Full Contact)
Bronze medal – third place	2004 Basel	-81 kg (Low Kick)

Russian Championships
Bronze medal – third place	2006 Chelyabinsk	-86 kg (Full Contact)
Gold medal – first place	2006 Samara	-81 kg (Low Kick)
Gold medal – first place	2006 Cherepovets	-84 kg (Light Contact)
Gold medal – first place	2005 Nevinnomyssk	-81 kg (Full Contact)
Gold medal – first place	2004 Perm	-81 kg (Light Contact)

Denis Alexandrovich Grachev (Russian: Денис Александрович Грачев) (born August 3, 1982) is a Russian boxer, kickboxer, and mixed martial artist residing in the United States. Grachev was the IKF Muay Thai world light cruiserweight champion.

== Biography ==
Grachev was born in 1982 in the city of Chaykovsky, Perm Oblast, Russian SFSR, Soviet Union. Grachev started training in kickboxing at the age of 14 and was trained by Gregory Golubkova, Mikhail Stepanov, Alik Basharov, Vyacheslav Tutubalina, Yuri Vtyurina and Vladimir Lavrov throughout the years. In 2005, Grachev graduated from the Chaykovsky State Institute of Physical Culture with a bachelor's degree in Physical Education.

In 2006, Grachev moved to San Diego, California, United States with Evgeny Khil — long-time friend and fellow kickboxer — after appointing Mark Dion of City Boxing as his manager. Grachev would represent City Boxing's professional fight team, as well as being the gym's kickboxing instructor. Although competing mostly under low kick/international and full contact rules, Grachev competed under Muay Thai rules while in the United States. When Grachev first moved into the United States, he had no understanding of English at all and was enrolled in English classes at San Diego City College by his manager Mark Dion. At this stage of Grachev's migration into the United States, he had been dabbling in mixed martial arts and boxing — his manager Mark Dion had plans of moving Grachev's career away from kickboxing since there was little money in the sport. Due to the lack of popularity of kickboxing in the United States, Denis Grachev eventually made the full-time commitment to boxing in 2011 and is primarily trained by former IBF minimumweight world champion Manny Melchor. Grachev states he has always enjoyed boxing, though resorted to kickboxing while growing up in Russia because there weren't any good boxing gyms in Chaykovsky.

== Kickboxing career ==
As an amateur in kickboxing, Grachev achieved a record of 123-18, with 40 of his wins coming by way of (T)KO. In the 2004 WKA/IAKSA Amateur World Championships in Basel, Switzerland — the first joint federation world championship — Grachev won the bronze medal under low kick/international rules. The following year in WAKO's Amateur World Championships in Szeged, Hungary, Grachev won the gold medal under full contact rules, also earning the classification of International Master of Sport in kickboxing.

During his professional career in Russia, Grachev competed most of his bouts in World BARS Kickboxing Federation. On September 13, 2006, he won WBKF's vacant Commonwealth of Independent States -81 kg championship under international/low kick rules when he defeated Denis Goncharenko of Belarus.

After moving to the United States in 2006, Grachev competed in his first kickboxing bout under Muay Thai rules against kickboxing legend Manson Gibson on July 7, 2007. The bout was for International Kickboxing Federation's Muay Thai light cruiserweight world championship. Grachev went on to win the world title with a third round TKO over Gibson after Gibson's corner threw in the towel from too much punishment.

On November 29, 2007, Grachev took on WBC Muaythai light heavyweight world champion Joe Schilling — who is currently renowned for being a sparring partner of mixed martial arts world champion Nick Diaz. Grachev defeated Schilling with a 47-second knockout in the first round after Grachev delivered a spinning heel kick to the body, as Schilling was unable to beat the referee's 10-count. In result, Grachev won IKKC's vacant U.S. super middleweight national championship.

== Boxing career ==
Denis Grachev made the transition to boxing in 2007 when he faced Rosendo Rubalcaba on June 24 — the professional debut for both combatants. Grachev won his professional debut with a second round knockout after knocking down Rubalcaba a total of four times the entire bout.

On December 11, 2009 (in a 6-round fight), Grachev fought to a controversial majority draw against Ernesto Castaneda in a fight where he was the effective aggressor, more ring-general, landed more punches and the harder punches in a majority of the rounds, and the fact that almost every ringside observer thought that Grachev had done enough to win. One judge scored it in his favour, with the other to judges scoring the fight even.

On July 4, 2011, Grachev went on to capture his first major championship in boxing when he defeated Eddie Caminero with a third round TKO and becoming the WBC Continental Americas light heavyweight champion.

On April 27, 2012, Grachev took on then-reigning NABF light heavyweight champion Ismayl Sillakh. At the time, Sillakh was a consensus top-10 ranked light heavyweight and was going into the bout as a heavy 11 to 1 odds favorite over Grachev. After being knocked down in the third round by Sillakh, as well as losing most rounds on the judges' scorecards, Grachev rallied an upset of the year TKO victory in the 8th round; also becoming the new NABF light heavyweight champion

Denis Grachev put his NABF light heavyweight title against former IBF super middleweight world champion Lucian Bute on November 3, 2012. The bout took place in Bute's hometown. Despite a tough, solid effort over 12 rounds, Grachev lost by unanimous decision. Though some believed that Grachev won the majority of the rounds (and therefore the fight) with his sheer aggression and the fact that he landed more punches, most analysts and ringside observers agreed and believed that Bute had the upper hand throughout the bout, as he out-boxed Grachev throughout a majority of the rounds of the fight and managed to land the harder punches of both of the fighters.

On March 30, 2013, Grachev added another big name to his boxing resume when he fought Zsolt Erdei in a 10-round fight and defeated him via split decision.

== Championships and accomplishments ==
=== Boxing ===
- Golden Gloves Ltd
  - 2013 Monte-Carlo Million Dollar Super Four Tournament runner-up
- World Boxing Council
  - NABF Light Heavyweight Championship (one time)
  - WBC Continental Americas Light Heavyweight Championship (one time)
  - 2012 NABF Upset of the Year vs. Ismayl Sillakh on April 27

=== Kickboxing ===
- International Kickboxing Federation
  - IKF Muay Thai World Light Cruiserweight Championship (one time)
- International Karate Kickboxing Council
  - IKKC Muay Thai United States Super Middleweight Championship (one time)
- World BARS Kickboxing Federation
  - WBKF Low Kick Commonwealth of Independent States -81 kg Championship (one time)
  - WBKF Low Kick Commonwealth of Independent States -86 kg Championship (one time)
- World Association of Kickboxing Organizations
  - 2005 WAKO Amateur World Championships Full Contact Light Heavyweight gold medalist
  - 2000 WAKO Amateur Junior World Championships Low Kick Light Middleweight gold medalist
- World Kickboxing Association/International Amateur Kickboxing Sports Association
  - 2004 WKA/IAKSA Amateur World Championships Low Kick Light Heavyweight bronze medalist
- Kickboxing Federation of Russia
  - 2006 Russia Amateur National Championships Full Contact bronze medalist
  - 2006 Russia Amateur National Championships Low Kick gold medalist
  - 2006 Russia Amateur National Championships Light Contact gold medalist
  - 2005 Russia Amateur National Championships Full Contact gold medalist
  - 2004 Russia Amateur National Championships Light Contact gold medalist
  - 2001 Cup of Peter International Tournament Low Kick gold medalist
- Federal Executive Body in the Field of Physical Culture & Sports
  - International Master of Sport (2001)

== Professional boxing record ==
13 wins (8 knockouts, 4 decisions), 5 losses, 1 draw
Res.	Record	Opponent	Type	Rd., time	Date	Location	Notes
Loss	13–5–1	Thomas Oosthuizen	RTD	11 (12)	2014-11-15	Emperors Palace, Kempton Park, South Africa	
Loss	13–4–1	Ryno Liebenberg	UD	12	2014-08-09	Emperors Palace, Kempton Park, South Africa	For vacant WBC Silver light heavyweight title
Loss	13–3–1	Isaac Chilemba	UD	10	2014-03-15	Sands Casino Resort Bethlehem, Bethlehem, Pennsylvania, U.S.	
Loss	13–2–1	Edwin Rodriguez	TKO	1 (10), 2:50	2013-07-13	Salle des Etoiles, Monte-Carlo, Monaco	Monte-Carlo Million Dollar Super Four Tournament Final.
Win	13–1–1	Zsolt Erdei	SD	10	2013-03-30	Salle des Etoiles, Monte-Carlo, Monaco	Monte-Carlo Million Dollar Super Four Tournament Semifinal.
Loss	12–1–1	Lucian Bute	UD	12	2012-11-03	Centre Bell, Montréal, Québec, Canada	Lost NABF light heavyweight title
Win	12–0–1	Ismayl Sillakh	TKO	8 (10), 2:18	2012-04-27	Frank Erwin Center, Austin, Texas, U.S.	Won NABF light heavyweight title
Win	11–0–1	Eddie Caminero	TKO	3 (10), 1:29	2011-07-09	Seminole Hard Rock Hotel and Casino Hollywood, Hollywood, Florida, U.S.	Won vacant WBC Continental Americas light heavyweight title
Win	10–0–1	Vladine Biosse	TKO	4 (10), 2:56	2011-05-06	Foxwoods Resort Casino, Mashantucket, Connecticut, U.S.	
Win	9–0–1	Azea Augustama	MD	8	2011-01-14	Magic City Casino, Miami, Florida, U.S.	
Draw	8–0–1	Ernesto Castaneda	MD	6	2009-12-11	Memorial Auditorium, Sacramento, California, U.S.	
Win	8–0	Roberto Baro	KO	3 (6), 2:58	2009-11-12	Four Points Sheraton Hotel, San Diego, California, U.S.	
Win	7–0	Carlos Raul Ibarra	MD	6	2009-08-27	Four Points Sheraton Hotel, San Diego, California, U.S.	
Win	6–0	Ayodeji Fadeyi	TKO	4 (6), 1:00	2009-04-30	4th and B, San Diego, California, U.S.	
Win	5–0	Thomas Haines	TKO	3 (6), 0:54	2008-10-23	Four Points Sheraton Hotel, San Diego, California, U.S.	
Win	4–0	Caleb Caldwell	KO	2 (4), 2:26	2008-07-24	4th and B, San Diego, California, U.S.	
Win	3–0	Freeman Taft	UD	4	2007-10-11	Oceanview Pavilion, Port Hueneme, California, U.S.	
Win	2–0	Robert Ryan	UD	4	2007-07-29	Quiet Cannon, Montebello, California, U.S.	
Win	1–0	Rosendo Rubalcaba	KO	2 (4), 2:06	2007-06-24	Del Mar Fairgrounds, Del Mar, California, U.S.	

== Kickboxing record (incomplete) ==
Kickboxing record
17 wins (7 (T)KOs, 10 decisions), 3 losses, 0 draws
Date	Result	Opponent	Event	Location	Method	Round	Time
October 2, 2010	Win	(United States) Fernando Gonzalez	WCK: Full Rules Muay Thai	(United States) Pala, California	UD	5	3:00
November 29, 2007	Win	(United States) Joe Schilling	WCK: Full Rules Muay Thai	(United States) Pala, California	KO	1	0:47
Won vacant IKKC Muay Thai United States Super Middleweight Championship.
July 7, 2007	Win	(United States) Manson Gibson	WCK: Full Rules Muay Thai	(United States) Inglewood, California	TKO	3	0:27
Won vacant IKF Muay Thai World Light Cruiserweight Championship.
September 13, 2006	Win	(Belarus) Denis Goncharenko	BARS: CIS Middleweight Championship 2006	(Russia) Moscow, Moscow Oblast	UD	8	3:00
Won vacant WBKF International Rules Commonwealth of Independent States -81 kg Championship.
July 19, 2006	Win	(Belarus) Andrey Gerasimchuk	BARS: Eurasian Super Heavyweight Championship 2006	(Russia) Moscow, Moscow Oblast	UD	3	3:00
June 7, 2006	Win	(Belarus) Alexander Shlakunov	BARS: Yashinov vs Zhuravlev	(Russia) Moscow, Moscow Oblast	UD	3	3:00
May 10, 2006	Win	(Belarus) Pavel Turuk	BARS: European Welterweight Championship 2006	(Russia) Moscow, Moscow Oblast	UD	3	3:00
March 29, 2006	Win	(Ukraine) Alexander Romaschenko	BARS: European Super Heavyweight Championship 2006	(Russia) Moscow, Moscow Oblast	UD	3	3:00
March 16, 2006	Win	(Russia) Kirill Ivanov	World BARS Kickboxing Federation	(Russia) Perm, Perm Oblast	UD	3	3:00
Won vacant WBKF International Rules Commonwealth of Independent States -86 kg Championship.
September 21, 2005	Win	(Belarus) Alexander Svitin	BARS: Zdragush vs Podolyachin	(Russia) Moscow, Moscow Oblast	UD	3	3:00
June 18, 2005	Loss	(Russia) Oleg Utenin	World BARS Kickboxing Federation	(Russia) Dedovsk, Moscow Oblast	SD	8	3:00
For Russia International Rules -81 kg Championship.
May 11, 2005	Win	(Belarus) Alexander Shlakunov	World BARS Kickboxing Federation	(Russia) Moscow, Moscow Oblast	UD	3	3:00
October 6, 2004	Loss	(Russia) Mikhail Chalykh	BARS: Shvoev vs Tsgoev	(Russia) Moscow, Moscow Oblast	UD	3	3:00
April 14, 2004	Loss	(Ukraine) Dmitry Borulko	World BARS Kickboxing Federation	(Russia) Moscow, Moscow Oblast	UD	3	3:00
March 24, 2004	Win	(Ukraine) Vladimir Todorov	World BARS Kickboxing Federation	(Russia) Moscow, Moscow Oblast	SD	3	3:00
Legend: Win Loss Draw/no contest Notes

== Mixed martial arts record ==
Professional record breakdown
4 matches	3 wins	1 loss
By knockout	1	0
By submission	2	0
By decision	0	1

Res.	Record	Opponent	Method	Event	Date	Round	Time	Location	Notes
Loss	3–1	Ricardo Funch	Decision (unanimous)	Cage Fight MMA 2: Blunt Force Trauma	August 23, 2008	3	5:00	Manchester, New Hampshire, United States	
Win	3–0	Daniel McWilliamson	Submission (guillotine)	Fist Series: WinterFist 2008	February 20, 2008	2	0:47	Irvine, California, United States	
Win	2–0	Chris Reed	TKO (punches)	Primal MMA: Noche de los Muertos	November 3, 2007	1	2:55	Tijuana, Baja California, Mexico	
Win	1–0	Kevin Greenwall	Submission (guillotine)	Ultimate Combat Experience: Round 27 - Finals	September 22, 2007	1	2:31	Salt Lake City, Utah, United States	

Achievements
Preceded by Ismail Sillakh	NABF Light Heavyweight Champion; April 27, 2012 – November 3, 2012	Succeeded by Lucian Bute
