= Aris Ambríz =

American boxer

Personal information
- Nickname: Killer
- Born: Aris Ambríz; December 18, 1985 (age 40) Azusa, California
- Height: 5 ft 11 in (182 cm)
- Weight: Welterweight; Light Welterweight

Boxing career
- Reach: 73 in (185 cm)
- Stance: Orthodox

Boxing record
- Total fights: 20
- Wins: 16
- Win by KO: 8
- Losses: 3
- Draws: 1
- No contests: 0

Aris Ambríz (born December 18, 1985) is an American professional boxer.

== Amateur career ==
In 2005 Ambríz fought at the National Golden Gloves Championships in the Light Welterweight division.

== Professional career ==
On February 28, 2011, Ambríz upset title contender Héctor Serrano, they fought at the Orange County Fairgrounds in Costa Mesa, California.

In his next fight Aris lost an undefeated Pier Olivier Cote, this bout was on Showtime's televised portion of the Pacquiao vs. Mosley undercard.
