= Franco Ambriz =

American dramatist

Franco Ambriz was a playwright and director. His plays have been produced in New York City, London, Israel and Los Angeles. He co-wrote Footsteps In The Dark with the late Iranian director Reza Abdoh for the Los Angeles Festival, artistic director Peter Sellars. The movie Upside Down, directed by the Mexican filmmaker Mário Mandujano, was based on his stage play Four Cows In New York City. His one-act ‘’The Date’’ was produced by HBO at the Lambs Theatre and the Puerto Rican Traveling Theatre in New York City; and published by Lazy Bee Scripts in the UK. “The Virgin Mary Is Alive and Living In The East Village” was produced at the ‘’West Bank Cafe’’ and directed by Katie Laris.

CIA
