= Adnan Amar =

English boxer (born 1983)

Personal information
- Nickname: "Nanito"
- Nationality: British
- Born: 17 February 1983 (age 43) Nottingham, Nottinghamshire, England
- Height: 177 cm (5 ft 10 in)
- Weight: light middleweight

Boxing career
- Stance: Orthodox

Boxing record
- Total fights: 29
- Wins: 26
- Win by KO: 7
- Losses: 3
- Draws: 0

Adnan Amar (born 17 February 1983) is an English professional boxer.

== Personal life ==
Amar was born in Nottingham to a family of British Pakistani origin. Amar took up the sport aged 15, inspired by Naseem Hamed and Brendan Ingle, stating Ingle as the biggest influence in his career. He has stated he didn't have much of an amateur career, coming on and off the sport for two years before turning professional at 18. Amongst his boxing heroes are Muhammad Ali, Naseem Hamed, Junior Witter and Sugar Ray Leonard.

== Professional career ==
=== Light Middleweight ===
He started his career as a Light Middleweight, where he won the British Masters Light Middleweight Title, by way of 6th-round TKO.

=== Light-Welterweight ===
Amar fought then undefeated prospect Dean Hickman at light-welterweight, only to lose the fight. He later stated that he wanted to avenge his loss but at welterweight as light-welterweight was not a division he could healthily fight in.

=== Welterweight ===
He later moved to Welterweight where he won the BBBofC Midlands Area welterweight title, winning it by way of 10th-round TKO, and the BBBofC English welterweight title. He had hoped to challenge Craig Watson for the Commonwealth welterweight stating "It's a title I just can't wait to fight for...Hopefully my promoter will bring the fight to Nottingham." Although the fight never took place. He later lost his English welterweight title to Lee Purdy, and stated that dehydration was the cause of his loss and that he plans to move back up in weight.

=== Cancelled fights ===
Several boxers have avoided facing Amar in the past, including unbeaten prospect Frankie Gavin and Colin Lynes, to which Amar has stated "... (It's) frustrating. I have seen fights fall through on the day or day before I'm due to fight." Amar has stated that among the reasons he believes he has not had a shot at the British titles was due to many opponents having pulled out of scheduled title challenges.

== Championships held ==
- English welterweight title
- Midlands Area welterweight title
- British Masters Light Middleweight title

== See also ==
- British Pakistanis
