= Lucian Bute =

Romanian boxer (born 1980)

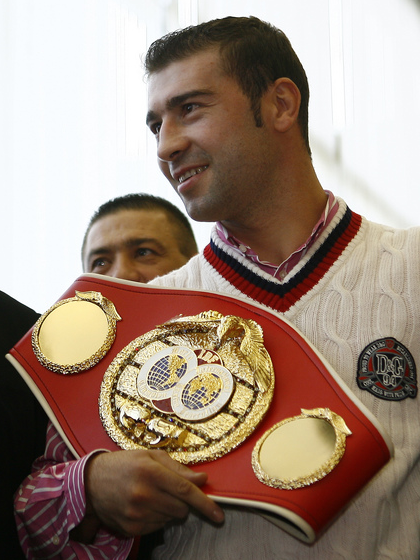
- Bute with the IBF title

Personal information
- Nicknames: Le Tombeur; Mister KO
- Nationality: Romanian; Canadian
- Born: February 28, 1980 (age 46) Pechea, Galați, Socialist Republic of Romania
- Height: 6 ft 1 1/2 in (187 cm)
- Weight: Super-middleweight; Light-heavyweight

Boxing career
- Reach: 72 in (183 cm)
- Stance: Southpaw

Boxing record
- Total fights: 37
- Wins: 32
- Win by KO: 25
- Losses: 5
Medal record
Men's amateur boxing
Representing Romania
World Championships
Bronze medal – third place	1999 Houston	Welterweight
Jeux de la Francophonie
Gold medal – first place	2001 Ottawa-Hull	Welterweight

Lucian Bute (born February 28, 1980) is a Romanian-Canadian former professional boxer who competed from 2003 to 2017. He held the IBF super-middleweight title from 2007 to 2012.

== Personal life ==
Lucian Bute was born on February 28, 1980, in Pechea, Galați County, Romania. After fighting for the Romanian national team as an amateur, winning multiple titles in both his homeland and abroad, Bute relocated to Laval, Quebec, Canada.

He also holds Canadian citizenship as of 2012.

He is the cousin of handball player Steluța Luca. She was also born in Pechea, Galați County.

== Amateur career ==
As an amateur, Bute won the bronze medal at the 1999 World Amateur Boxing Championships in Houston, Texas, and the gold medal at the 2001 Francophone Games. Bute also represented Romania at the 2003 World Amateur Boxing Championships in Bangkok, Thailand as a middleweight, where he was defeated and eliminated from the 2003 World Amateur Boxing Championship by the current middleweight champion Gennady Golovkin with a superb knockout at round 4. Before KO Golovkin, who won 2003 World Amateur Boxing Championship, was outpointing Bute with 13 points.

=== 1999 World Amateur Championship results ===
- Defeated Nurhan Süleymanoğlu (Turkey) 9-5
- Defeated Mihály Kótai (Hungary) 8-4
- Defeated Kejstutis Sandanavicius (Lithuania) 18-5
- Lost to Timur Gaydalov (Russia) 7-10

=== 2003 World Amateur Championship results ===
- Lost to Gennady Golovkin (Kazakhstan) KO-4

Bute claimed an amateur record of 235–15.

== Professional career ==
Lucian Bute turned pro in 2003. On September 11, 2014, Bute announced that he would be trained by Fredie Roach. He was previously trained by Stéphan Larouche, who also trained former world champions Éric Lucas and Leonard Doroftei.

=== IBF super-middleweight champion ===
On June 15, 2007, Bute faced super middleweight contender and former Olympian Sakio Bika at the Bell Centre in Montreal in an elimination bout for the IBF title. Bute beat Bika by unanimous decision (116-111, 118-109, 118-109) and, as a result, he got his shot at the IBF Super Middleweight Champion Alejandro Berrio on October 19, 2007. Bute beat Berrio via TKO in the 11th round. With this victory, Bute became the third professional boxing world champion of Romania in its short history after the fall of communism after Leonard Doroftei and Mihai Leu and also the third champion in InterBox's history after Eric Lucas and Dorin.

==== Bute vs. Andrade and last-round controversy ====
On October 24, 2008, Bute defeated Mexico's Librado Andrade by unanimous decision but the end of the fight was marred with controversy. Andrade became Bute's mandatory challenger by defeating Robert Stieglitz. While Bute dominated his opponent through most of the fight, he nearly lost the title when he was knocked down by Andrade with two seconds left in the 12th and final round. When the referee, Marlon B. Wright, reached the eight count, the bell sounding the end of the match rang. However, the referee stopped the count temporarily when he signaled Andrade to return to his corner.

==== Bute vs. Zúñiga ====
Bute defeated three-time world title challenger Fulgencio Zúñiga on March 13, 2009. In round four, Bute knocked Zúñiga down with a left uppercut to the body. Zúñiga got up, but Bute continued the assault, eventually leading to a stoppage by the referee.

==== Bute vs. Andrade II ====
On November 29, 2009, Lucian Bute fought Andrade in a rematch and won with a fourth-round KO at Colisee Pepsi in Quebec City, Canada. Bute retained his IBF Super Middleweight title. The first three rounds saw Andrade as the aggressor and Bute played the role of counter-puncher, as had been the case in the first fight. HBO's unofficial scorecard had Bute up 30-27 after the 3rd round. In round 4, Bute landed a short left hook to the jaw of Andrade sending to the canvas. Andrade beat the count but was soon caught by a left uppercut to the body that sent him down for the count at 2:57 of round 4.

==== Bute vs. Miranda, Brinkley ====
On April 17, 2010, Bute stopped Edison Miranda at 1:22 of the third round to retain his IBF Super Middleweight title in Montreal in front of nearly 15,000 fans. Miranda lost the first two rounds and he was knocked out during the third round with a left uppercut to the jaw. Miranda got back on his feet but the referee decided to stop the fight seconds after, so the result was a technical knockout.

On October 15, at the Bell Centre in Montréal, IBF Super Middleweight Champion Lucian Bute scored an impressive ninth round KO over mandatory challenger Jesse Brinkley. It was mostly a tactical fight until Bute dropped Brinkley with a left uppercut to the body in round five. Brinkley barely beat the count. Bute floored Brinkley for the second time in round eight and knocked him out with an uppercut in round nine. It was Bute's sixth title defense.

==== Bute vs. Magee ====
Bute dominated and stopped European Super Middleweight Champion Brian Magee in the 10th round in a mostly one-sided fight at the Bell Centre in Montreal, Quebec. Magee showed incredible heart throughout and had some good moments in the earlier rounds. However, Bute wore Magee down, knocking him down three times – once in the 6th, another time in the 7th and a final time in the 10th. Bute won the fight with an uppercut in the 10th round. The bout was stopped at 2:04 of the round. The fight took place on March 19, 2011. This was Bute's seventh successful defense in a row.

==== Bute vs. Mendy ====
Bute successfully defended his IBF Super Middleweight title for the eighth time in a row in Romania on 9 July 2011 against the previously unbeaten Jean-Paul Mendy of France. The Frenchman was the IBF's number one contender and the mandatory challenger. This was Bute's first defense in Romania and his second fight there since 2005. The event took place at Romexpo and Bute won in the fourth round by knockout.

==== Bute vs. Johnson ====
Bute defeated Glen Johnson (51-15-2, 35 KOs) via unanimous decision at Québec City's Colisée Pepsi. The judges scorecards read 119-109 and 120-108 twice.

==== Bute vs. Froch ====
The IBF officially enforced Carl Froch (28-2, 20 KOs) as Bute's number one mandatory. The fight, billed as No Easy Way Out, took place on 26 May 2012 in Froch's hometown of Nottingham. Despite being the overwhelming underdog with bookmakers, critics and fans around the world, Froch dominated Bute throughout the fight to become the IBF super-middleweight champion via TKO in round five.

=== Light-heavyweight ===
==== Bute vs. Grachev ====
On November 3, 2012, in his first fight since his loss to Froch, Bute fought Denis Grachev for the latter's NABF light heavyweight title. The bout took place in Montreal, Quebec. Despite strong opposition from Grachev, who was very aggressive throughout the fight, Bute was still able to not only narrowly out-box Grachev in a majority of the rounds (including a huge rally in the twelfth and final round that saw him land punches filled with loads of power over and over again on Grachev), but land the harder punches throughout the fight and was able to win the fight via unanimous decision. Unofficial ringside scorer, Russ Anber, scored the fight: 118-112, for Bute.

==== Bute vs. Pascal, Di Luisa ====
It was announced that Bute would fight Jean Pascal on May 25, 2013, in Montreal, Quebec. Bute would be making his first defense of his NABF light heavyweight championship, and the winner of the fight would become the WBC Diamond champion in the class. However, on May 8, 2013, Bute was forced to pull out of the fight due to an injury that required surgery to remove bone fragments from his left hand. The fight was rescheduled for January 18, 2014. Pascal ended up winning the fight by unanimous decision 117-110, 117-111 and 116-112.

On August 15, 2015, coming off a 19-month layoff due in part to a back injury, Lucian Bute displayed little signs of ring rust as he stopped Andrea Di Luisa in four one-sided rounds.

=== Return to super-middleweight ===
==== Bute vs. DeGale ====
In mid-2015, it was announced that Bute would take part in a title fight against IBF super-middleweight champion James DeGale. The fight was DeGale's first defence of the IBF belt, and took place in Bute's adopted home-town of Quebec on 28 November 2015. After 12 rounds, the fight went to the judge's scorecards, and DeGale was awarded a unanimous decision; 116-112, 117-111, 117-111. Despite suffering the third loss of his career, Bute emerged with credit from what several commentators described as an exciting fight.

==== Bute vs. Jack ====
On Labor Eve 2016, Bute was named as the replacement for Julio Cesar Chavez Jr. to challenge Badou Jack for the WBC Super Middleweight Championship. The bout was declared a majority draw and, as such, Bute failed to capture the title. This would also mean Bute's first draw in his entire boxing career.

On May 27, 2016, Bute tested positive for a banned substance ostarine, which is not an anabolic steroid but is said to increase stamina and recovery ability and produce similar results. It has been on the World Anti-Doping Agency banned list since 2008. His B sample came back on August 12, just like his A sample showed in late May, it was positive again for the banned substance.

Bute denied having knowingly taken a banned substance. The Washington commission, following its investigation, went along with Bute's assertion that he ingested the substance due to contamination of nutritional supplements prescribed by Bute's conditioning trainer and created by a laboratory in California.

Subsequently, Bute was allowed to resume his career after a six-month suspension and a $50,000 fine. In-depth analyses has demonstrated beyond all doubt that the positive result of the drug test was due to contamination of nutritional supplements. On April 24, 2017, the DC commission changed the outcome of the fight to a disqualification win in favour of Jack.

=== Return to light-heavyweight ===
==== Bute vs. Álvarez ====
Following the two super middleweight world title challenges, Bute announced he would move back up to the light heavyweight division. On December 8, 2016, promoter Yvon Michel announced a deal had been agreed for Bute to fight undefeated light heavyweight contender and WBC #1 ranked fighter Eleider Álvarez on February 24, 2017, at the Centre Videotron in Quebec, Canada. At the time the fight was made, Álvarez had a scheduled fight with Norbert Dabrowski on December 10, which he won and a win over Bute would put him in line for a WBC title match against Adonis Stevenson in 2017. Bute lost the fight via 5th round stoppage in a fairly competitive fight.

=== Retirement ===
After months of pondering whether or not to retire, on March 21, 2019, Bute officially announced his retirement from professional boxing, having not fought in over two years. He retired with a record of 32 wins, with 25 coming inside the distance and 5 losses.

== Professional boxing record ==
37 fights	32 wins	5 losses
By knockout	25	2
By decision	7	2
By disqualification	0	1

No.	Result	Record	Opponent	Type	Round, time	Date	Location	Notes
37	Loss	32–5	Eleider Álvarez	TKO	5 (12), 2:22	Feb 24, 2017	Videotron Centre, Quebec City, Quebec, Canada	For WBC Silver light-heavyweight title
36	Loss	32–4	Badou Jack	DQ	12	Apr 30, 2016	D.C. Armory, Washington, D.C., U.S.	For WBC super-middleweight title; Originally MD, later ruled DQ after Bute failed a drug test
35	Loss	32–3	James DeGale	UD	12	Nov 28, 2015	Videotron Centre, Quebec City, Quebec, Canada	For IBF super-middleweight title
34	Win	32–2	Andrea Di Luisa	TKO	4 (10), 1:53	Aug 15, 2015	Bell Centre, Montreal, Quebec, Canada	
33	Loss	31–2	Jean Pascal	UD	12	Jan 18, 2014	Bell Centre, Montreal, Quebec, Canada	Lost NABF light-heavyweight title
32	Win	31–1	Denis Grachev	UD	12	Nov 3, 2012	Bell Centre, Montreal, Quebec, Canada	Won NABF light-heavyweight title
31	Loss	30–1	Carl Froch	TKO	5 (12), 1:05	May 26, 2012	Nottingham Arena, Nottingham, England	Lost IBF super-middleweight title
30	Win	30–0	Glen Johnson	UD	12	Nov 5, 2011	Colisée Pepsi, Quebec City, Quebec, Canada	Retained IBF super-middleweight title
29	Win	29–0	Jean-Paul Mendy	KO	4 (12), 2:48	Jul 9, 2011	Romexpo, Bucharest, Romania	Retained IBF super-middleweight title
28	Win	28–0	Brian Magee	TKO	10 (12), 2:04	Mar 19, 2011	Bell Centre, Montreal, Quebec, Canada	Retained IBF super-middleweight title
27	Win	27–0	Jesse Brinkley	KO	9 (12), 2:48	Oct 15, 2010	Bell Centre, Montreal, Quebec, Canada	Retained IBF super-middleweight title
26	Win	26–0	Edison Miranda	TKO	3 (12), 1:22	Apr 17, 2010	Bell Centre, Montreal, Quebec, Canada	Retained IBF super-middleweight title
25	Win	25–0	Librado Andrade	KO	4 (12), 2:57	Nov 28, 2009	Colisée Pepsi, Quebec City, Quebec, Canada	Retained IBF super-middleweight title
24	Win	24–0	Fulgencio Zúñiga	TKO	4 (12), 2:25	Mar 13, 2009	Bell Centre, Montreal, Quebec, Canada	Retained IBF super-middleweight title
23	Win	23–0	Librado Andrade	UD	12	Oct 24, 2008	Bell Centre, Montreal, Quebec, Canada	Retained IBF super-middleweight title
22	Win	22–0	William Joppy	TKO	10 (12), 1:08	Feb 29, 2008	Bell Centre, Montreal, Quebec, Canada	Retained IBF super-middleweight title
21	Win	21–0	Alejandro Berrio	TKO	11 (12), 1:27	Oct 19, 2007	Bell Centre, Montreal, Quebec, Canada	Won IBF super-middleweight title
20	Win	20–0	Sakio Bika	UD	12	Jun 15, 2007	Bell Centre, Montreal, Quebec, Canada	
19	Win	19–0	Sergey Tatevosyan	UD	12	Jan 26, 2007	Bell Centre, Montreal, Quebec, Canada	Retained WBO Inter-Continental super-middleweight title
18	Win	18–0	James Obede Toney	TKO	8 (12), 2:49	Sep 15, 2006	Bell Centre, Montreal, Quebec, Canada	Retained NABF, NABA and WBC Continental Americas super-middleweight titles
17	Win	17–0	Lolenga Mock	UD	12	May 16, 2006	Bell Centre, Montreal, Quebec, Canada	Won WBO Inter-Continental super-middleweight title
16	Win	16–0	Andre Thysse	UD	12	Mar 24, 2006	Bell Centre, Montreal, Quebec, Canada	Retained WBC Continental Americas super-middleweight title
15	Win	15–0	Donnell Wiggins	KO	2 (12), 2:53	Dec 2, 2005	Bell Centre, Montreal, Quebec, Canada	Retained NABA super-middleweight title
14	Win	14–0	Kabary Salem	TKO	8 (12), 3:00	Sep 16, 2005	Bell Centre, Montreal, Quebec, Canada	Won vacant NABF and WBC Continental Americas super-middleweight titles
13	Win	13–0	Jose Spearman	KO	8 (12), 2:13	Jun 3, 2005	Maurice Richard Arena, Montreal, Quebec, Canada	Retained NABA super-middleweight title
12	Win	12–0	Donny McCrary	KO	4 (12), 2:10	Apr 21, 2005	Sports Hall, Galați, Romania	Retained NABA super-middleweight title
11	Win	11–0	Christian Cruz	TKO	12 (12), 2:18	Mar 18, 2005	Bell Centre, Montreal, Quebec, Canada	Won vacant NABA super-middleweight title
10	Win	10–0	Carl Handy	TKO	4 (12), 2:09	Feb 19, 2005	Pavillon de la Jeunesse, Quebec City, Quebec, Canada	Won vacant NABF light-heavyweight title
9	Win	9–0	Dingaan Thobela	TKO	4 (8), 1:22	Dec 3, 2004	Bell Centre, Montreal, Quebec, Canada	
8	Win	8–0	Norman Johnson	TKO	2 (6), 1:19	Nov 1, 2004	The Roxy, Boston, Massachusetts, U.S.	
7	Win	7–0	Willard Lewis	TKO	3 (8), 3:00	Oct 30, 2004	Le Medley, Montreal, Quebec, Canada	
6	Win	6–0	Rico Cason	TKO	2 (6), 2:43	Oct 16, 2004	Club Ovation, Boynton Beach, Florida, U.S.	
5	Win	5–0	Tyler Hughes	TKO	3 (6), 2:46	Jul 24, 2004	Boardwalk Hall, Atlantic City, New Jersey, U.S.	
4	Win	4–0	Zane Marks	TKO	1 (4), 2:35	Apr 24, 2004	Colisée Pepsi, Quebec City, Quebec, Canada	
3	Win	3–0	Jean Pascal Service	KO	1 (4), 1:48	Mar 20, 2004	Montreal Casino, Montreal, Quebec, Canada	
2	Win	2–0	Darin Johnson	TKO	1 (4), 2:50	Dec 20, 2003	Bell Centre, Montreal, Quebec, Canada	
1	Win	1–0	Robert Muhammad	TKO	2 (4), 2:05	Nov 22, 2003	Bell Centre, Montreal, Quebec, Canada	

Sporting positions
Regional boxing titles
Vacant Title last held by Donnell Wiggins	NABF light-heavyweight champion February 19, 2005 – March 2005; Vacated	Vacant Title next held by Eric Harding
Vacant Title last held by Librado Andrade	NABA super-middleweight champion March 18, 2005 – June 2007; Vacated	Vacant Title next held by Jean Pascal
Vacant Title last held by Scott Pemberton	NABF super-middleweight champion September 16, 2005 – June 2007; Vacated	Vacant Title next held by Jean Pascal
Vacant Title last held by Éric Lucas	WBC Continental Americas super-middleweight champion September 16, 2005 – June 2007; Vacated	Vacant Title next held by Jean Pascal
Preceded by Lolenga Mock	WBO Inter-Continental super-middleweight champion May 16, 2006 – May 2007; Vacated	Vacant Title next held by Jürgen Brähmer
Preceded by Denis Grachev	NABF light-heavyweight champion November 3, 2012 – Jan 18, 2014	Vacant Title next held by Jean Pascal
World boxing titles
Preceded by Alejandro Berrio	IBF super middleweight champion October 19, 2007 – May 26, 2012	Succeeded by Carl Froch
