= Pechea =

- Commune
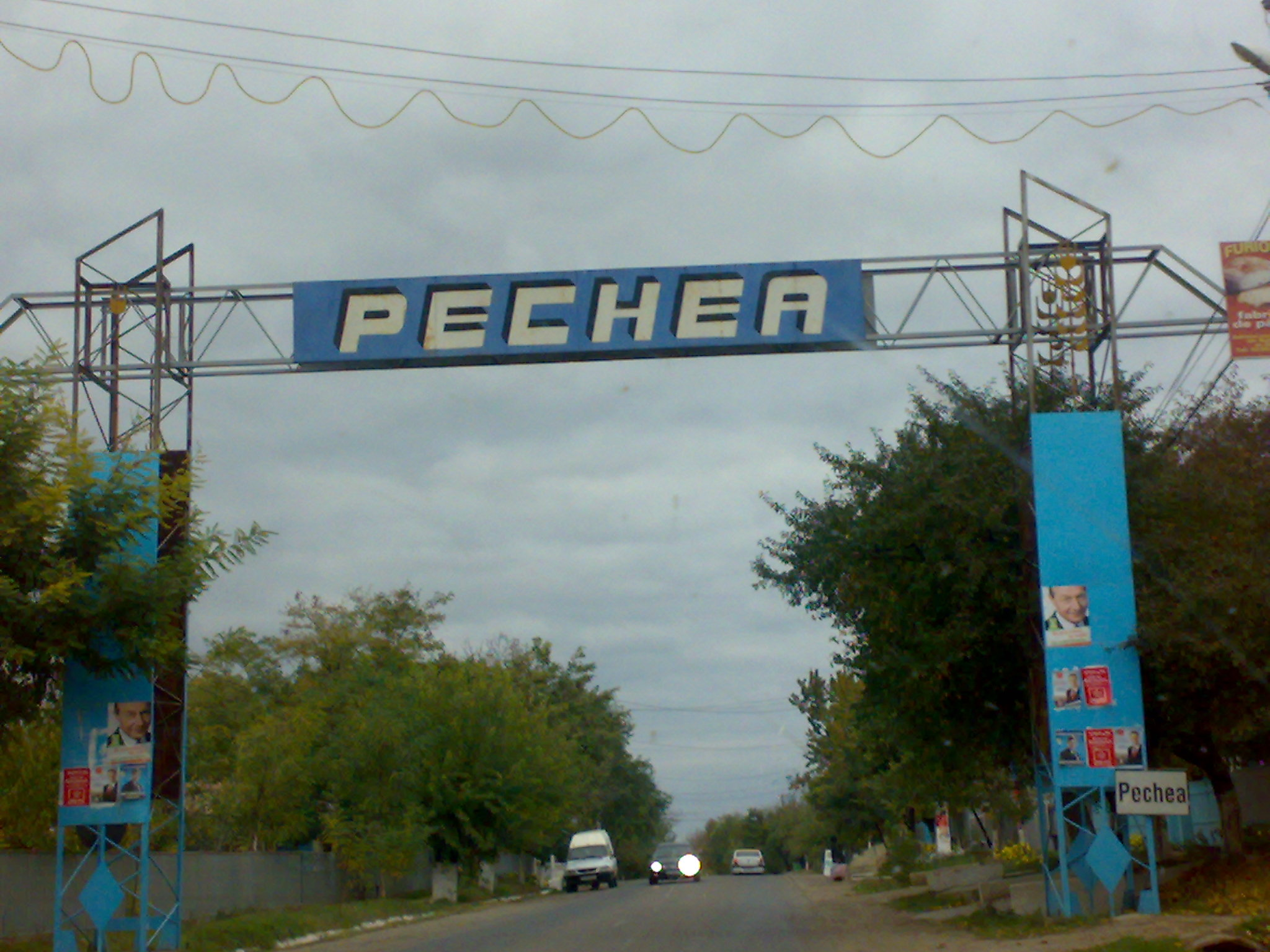
- Entrance to the commune

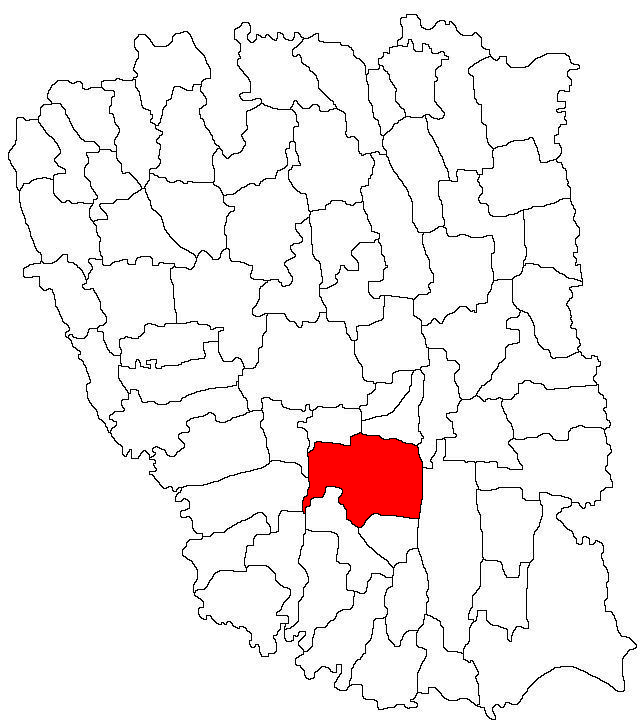
- Location in Galați County

- Location in Romania
- Coordinates: 45°38′N 27°48′E
- Country: Romania
- County: Galați

Government
  - Mayor (2024–2028): Mihăiță Mâncilă (PSD)
- Area: 116.1 km^{2} (44.8 sq mi)
- Elevation: 41 m (135 ft)
- Population (2021-12-01): 10,197
  - Density: 87.83/km^{2} (227.5/sq mi)
- Time zone: UTC+02:00 (EET)
  - Summer (DST): UTC+03:00 (EEST)
- Postal code: 807240
- Area code: +(40) 236
- Vehicle reg.: GL
- Website: comunapechea.ro

Pechea is a commune in Galați County, Western Moldavia, Romania. It is composed of two villages, Lupele and Pechea.

Historical population
Year	Pop.	±%
2002	11,421	—
2011	10,152	−11.1%
2021	10,197	+0.4%
Source: Census data

At the 2021 census, the commune had a population of 10,197, of which 93.16% were Romanians.

== Natives ==
- Lucian Bute (born 1980), boxer
- Christian Hammer (born 1987), boxer
- Steluța Luca (born 1975), handball player and coach
- Costică Silion (born 1955), general
