= Information Communications Technology education in the Philippines =

Information Communications Technology is usually included in the Home Economics and Livelihood Education program in grade school and taught through the Technology and Home Economics program in high school. The recent status of ICT education in the Philippines, along with other Southeast Asian countries, was surveyed by the Southeast Asian Ministers of Education Organization (SEAMEO) in 2011. Using the UNESCO model of ICT Development in Education, the countries were ranked as Emerging, Applying, Infusing or Transforming. The Philippines (with Indonesia, Thailand, and Vietnam) were ranked at the Infusing stage of integrating ICT in education, indicating that the country has integrated ICT into existing teaching, learning and administrative practices and policies. This includes components such as a national vision of ICT in education, national ICT plans and policies, complementary national ICT and education policies, professional development for teachers and school leaders, community or partnership and teaching and learning pedagogies. A 2012 study reported that public high schools in Metro Manila had a computer to student ratio of 1:63. While 88 percent of schools have internet connections, half of the students claimed not to be using it.

== History ==
=== Early modernization efforts ===
In 1996, the Department of Education initialized a 10-year modernization program, which included a computerization project and the School of the Future project. The modernization project aimed to implement information technology in the improvement of teaching and learning processes, as well as in educational management and operations. This project was supported by numerous other government agencies and private sectors. Three-fourths of its budget of PHP 375 million was used on hardware and software procurement, while the remaining quarter on staff training on ICT. The modernization program also established a Center of Education and Technology (CET) whose main purpose was the development and production of multimedia instruction materials, hardware, software and training of DECS personnel. An additional of PHP 300 million was allocated in 1997 to computerize 97 state universities and colleges and another PHP 210 million was allocated in 1999 to equip 325 schools with computers and train 4000 teachers.

=== Project Cares ===
In March 2001, The Senate of Committee on Education launched Project Cares, designed to improve upon the current public elementary and secondary school educational systems through the use and application of ICT. It provided public and district school offices with computer-based management and operation support tools that aimed to make the school more efficient and productive with their work.

To improve upon the number and quality of skill of ICT professionals, both the Senate and the House of Representatives contemplated laws to make public and private institutions incorporate ICT into their curriculum at all levels of education. Among those plans proposed to improve ICT in the Philippines were tax incentives to encourage private companies to donate computer equipment to schools or research institutions and a bill that would have mandated the installation of computer equipment on all public schools.

=== Other non-government efforts ===
Other non-government organizations such as Philippine Business for Social Progress (PBSP) have expressed the need for ICT education as well. The group formulated a portfolio of project proposals to build schools that would be focused on ICT personnel training and software development. Companies would review the portfolio and select the projects that they would want to fund. One of the projects, entitled "Computer Laboratories Program for Secondary Schools", sought to provide computer laboratories in at least 50 public and private high schools. This initiative produced numerous ICT experts from various schools and equipped institutions with the proper equipment.

=== Recent development ===
In 2011, the Department of Education implemented the Enhanced Basic Education Information System, an online facility for encoding, storage and report generation of all school information such as enrolment, resource inventories and special programs. It was to create an online and automated system of gathering data to provide the department with more relevant and accurate information for decision making and planning. With this improved system, it aims to improve budget allocations in the Philippines, providing more schools with more equipment.

=== ICT on K-12 Program ===
In 2012, The Department of Education and the United States Agency for International Development undertook a review on the computer accessibility in public schools as well as the past and ongoing ICT projects being implemented there. They aimed to improve upon those projects with regard to the new educational curriculum. The DepEd Computerization program has been implemented which deployed computer packages to 5409 public elementary and high schools to support the teaching and learning process.

Under the K-12 Program, ICT is a strand subsumed under the Technology and Livelihood Education (TLE) and Technical-Vocational-Livelihood (TVL), which is one of the four tracks under the Senior High School Specialized Subjects. This track also includes Agri-Fishery Arts, Home Economics, Industrial Arts, and TVL Maritime professional strands. A senior high school student can specialize in ICT or any of these strands and will receive a certificate that could be used for employment or a basis for further college education upon completion.

The ICT strand allows students to learn writing computer programs, digital illustration, and website design/development. Students also take up technical drafting, animation, and Java programming, which are expected to equip students with the skills necessary to succeed in the creative technological field. Other subjects in the strand include medical transcription and telecom installation, which could be useful to students planning to work for the telecommunications industry or further study a bachelor's degree related to it.

ICT IN EDUCATION

If designed and implemented properly, ICT-supported education can promote the acquisition of the knowledge and skills that will empower students for lifelong learning. When used appropriately, ICTs, especially computers and Internet technologies, enable new ways of teaching and learning rather than simply allow teachers and students to do what they have done before in a better way. These new ways of teaching and learning are underpinned by constructivist theories of learning and constitute a shift from a teacher-centered pedagogy, in its worst form characterized by memorization and rote learning, to one that is learner-centered (Tinio, 2002). The introduction of the modern library and the pencil in the mid-1600s marked the beginning of the use of technology in education? In the latter part of the 1970s, the very first computer was integrated into schools. By the early 1980s when IBM created the first PC, nearly twenty percent of schools in the UK and the US had computers in use. By the year 2005, more than 50% of public schools included laptops for students in their technology budget. It was at this same time, more than 90% of schools had access to the Internet. By 2011, many schools were including tablet PCs for students and teachers in their technology budget. Concerns over educational relevance and quality coexist with the imperative of expanding education- al opportunities to those made most vulnerable by globalization—developing countries in general; low-income groups, girls and women, and low-skilled workers in particular. Global changes also put pressure on all groups to constantly acquire and apply new skills. The International Labor Organization defines the requirements for education and training in the new global economy simply as “Basic Education for All” “Core Work Skills for All” and “Lifelong Learning for All”.

Information and communication technologies (ICTs)—which include radio and television, as well as newer digital technologies such as computers and the Internet—have been touted as potentially powerful enabling tools for educational change and reform. When used appropriately, different ICTs are said to help expand access to education, strengthen the relevance of education to the increasingly digital workplace, and raise educational quality by, among others, helping make teaching and learning into an engaging, active process connected to real life. However, the experience of introducing different ICTs in the classroom and other educational settings all over the world over the past several decades suggests that the full realization of the potential educational benefits of ICTs is not automatic. The effective integration of ICTs into the educational system is a complex, multifaceted process that involves not just technology—indeed, given enough initial capital, getting the technology is the easiest part!—but also curriculum and pedagogy, institutional readiness, teacher competencies, and long-term financing, among others. How can ICTs help expand access to education? ICTs are a potentially powerful tool for extending educational opportunities, both formal and non-for- mal, to previously underserved constituencies—scattered and rural populations, groups traditionally excluded from education due to cultural or social reasons such as ethnic minorities, girls and women, persons with disabilities, and the elderly, as well as all others who for reasons of cost or because of time constraints are unable to enroll on campus. • Anytime, anywhere. One defining feature of ICTs is their ability to transcend time and space. ICTs make possible asynchronous learning, or learning characterized by a time lag between the delivery of instruction and its reception by learners. Online course materials, for example, may be accessed 24 hours a day, 7 days a week. ICT-based educational delivery (e.g., educational programming broadcast over radio or television) also dispenses with the need for all learners and the instructor to be in one physical location. Additionally, certain types of ICTs, such as teleconferencing technologies, enable instruction to be received simultaneously by multiple, geo- graphically dispersed learners (i.e., synchronous learning). Access to remote learning resources. Teachers and learners no longer have to rely solely on printed books and other materials in physical media housed in libraries (and available in limited quantities) for their educational needs. With the Internet and the World Wide Web, a wealth of learning materials in almost every subject and in a variety of media can now be accessed from anywhere at any time of the day and by an unlimited number of people. This is particularly significant for many schools in developing countries, and even some in developed countries, that have limited and outdated library resources. ICTs also facilitate access to resource persons— mentors, experts, researchers, professionals, business leaders, and peers—all over the world. Integrating Information and Communication Technology or ICT into teaching and learning has become a great concern for many educators in developing countries like the Philippines. ICT must be used and taught in powerful and meaningful ways. With its rapid development, educators should find ways to integrate technology in the learning process. ICT should not drive education, rather, educational goals and needs must drive its use in schools. Targeting holistic growth for learners is a crucial factor in realizing the need to develop ICT curriculum standards for K-12 schools in the Philippines. The researcher believes that developing these standards is a decision making process that will dictate how Filipino students will acquire ICT concepts and skills to help them achieve the greater benefits of learning.

This can lead to better retention of information and improved academic performance for students. Additionally, technology can provide opportunities for students to collaborate and communicate with each other, which can enhance their social and communication skills. With technology, teachers can work on customizing learning for students. Also, it enables teachers to compare student performance in a quantified manner given tools such as student management systems have pre-built reports to track student performance, progress, and participation in classroom activities.Nov 25, 2022

== Curricula ==
=== NSEC (1989–2002) ===
As of 1989, the New Secondary Education Curriculum (NSEC) was implemented under the 1989 Secondary Education Development Program (SEDP). Though its aim is to make it a technology-oriented curriculum, no basic computer technology courses are part of the general education yet. However, there were already technical schools, college and universities offering vocational and technical courses in computer technology—ranging from 5 months to 3 years.

==== Secondary education ====
Some of the common courses related to ICT include the following (as of 1991):

1. System and Programming Skills Courses
  - Computer Fundamentals
  - Structured BASIC Course
  - Programming Fundamentals
  - COBOL
  - C
  - PASCAL
  - FORTRAN
  - DBASE iii Programming
  - FOXBASE+ Programming
  - Turbo Pascal
  - Systems Analysis and Design
  - Comprehensive Programming
  - Assembler RPG
2. User-Oriented Computer Courses
  - Personal Computer Concepts
  - WordStar Professional
  - Multimate
  - DBASE III+ for Users
  - Lotus 123
  - Quattro
  - Word Perfect
3. Five-Month Computer Secretarial Course
  - Targeted towards secretaries or clerks in Wordstar, Multimate and some other related computer skills
4. Special Computer Technician Course
  - A rapid (3-6 months) course to train students in simple repair and maintenance of computer hardware.

==== Vocational and technical courses ====
- One-Year Computer Technology course

Designed to train computer programmers and operators, this course concentrates on developing skills in programming and systems development. Open to high school graduates, this course focuses on providing hands-on learning experiences.

- Two-Year Computer Science and Technology

A post-secondary program, this is designed to train programmers and systems analysts. Graduates are expected to use the languages of the computer; go through hands-on exercises and problem-solving exercises; and develop their own software. The course also includes general education courses trained to broaden the overall education of the graduate.

- Two-Year Business Data Processing course

A post-secondary course targeted at developing skills in programming and the use of computer language in payrolls, inventories, and other similar business problems. It also includes planning tools such as PERT, CPM, Gantt charts, simulation and other techniques that are business related. Beyond the specialized computer and business education components, it also includes general education. Completion of this course leads to a Certificate in Business Data Processing.

- Two-Year Junior Computer Secretarial course

A post-secondary course designed in producing computer-oriented secretaries. The course includes various subjects such as office procedures and techniques, computer application, computer software and other relevant general education courses to meet the needs of a modern office secretary.

- Two-Year Computer Technician course

A post-secondary course with aims to train computer technicians. The course concerns mostly with the hardware, such as the assembly, maintenance and repair of computers: including trouble-shooting, testing, method of prototyping, and instrumentation. To check how the computer functions, the course also includes instruction in computer software.

- Three-Year Computer Technology course

A course for computer technicians, its curriculum discusses technology education in trades and industries. This course is designed to train graduates in the construction and operation of computers, electronic circuits, computer circuit analysis, troubleshooting and servicing of computer hardware, facility in computer language for scientific problem solving, data processing and other application. This course includes two summers of on-the-job training such that the student can be immersed in the computer industry. Completion of the course yields a diploma in Computer Technology.

- Three-Year Computer Engineering Technology course

A relatively new program in computer education during its time, this course was designed to produce computer engineering technicians proficient in computer hardware and software technologies, similar to the three-year computer technology course. After completing this course, graduates are awarded a diploma in Computer Engineering Technology. This three-year program gives the graduate two options: to either complete a bachelor's degree in computer engineering or seek employment as a computer technician.

==== Undergraduate degree programs ====
- Bachelor of Technology (Major in Computer Technology)

Designed to train computer technologists who are proficient in the assembly, maintenance and servicing of computer hardware, and in computer software; this program expects to help supply the computer industry with proficient upper-level technical and management workers in computer production and maintenance services. Students admitted to this program are graduates of the three-year Industrial Technology/Technician course, major in computer technology and who have at least a minimum of two years work experience in the computer industry.

- Bachelor of Science in Computer Science (BSCS)

This degree program aims to create highly proficient computer professionals. This curriculum consists of a balance between general education and technical courses in computers designed to provide professional training in the languages of the computers and in designing systems. The graduates are expected to be able to use each of the computer languages and software in solving problems that need to be computerized. Graduates are trained and required to be able to develop their own software.

- Bachelor of Science in Computer Information Science (BSCIS)

Similar to the BSCS, this program specializes in information systems design and development. This includes general education studies and a series of specialized computer courses in programming and systems development. Similar to BSCS graduates, graduates of the BSCIS are expected to be able to develop software and become proficient in the area of computerized information systems.

- Computer Education Teacher/Trainer Development

Intended for teachers, this course aims to train professional teachers in computer software in various levels of the educational system. As of 1991, the sourcing of computer teachers is mainly done by getting existing computer professionals into teaching.

- Trainers Training Program (Computer Software)

Taking from one to six weeks, this course is designed for computer teachers or for computer professionals who are already teaching. This course includes basic computer fundamentals, teaching principles, techniques, and practicum in the design of training materials, machine problems, and exercises.

- Bachelor of Technician Teacher Education

This program provides teaching competence. Considering the necessity to integrate computer education in all levels of the educational system, a teaching training program in computer education should be considered.

=== BEC (2002–2010) ===
The premise of the new curriculum was an attempt to improve upon the existing curriculum (which was NSEC). Like the previous curriculum, it included Filipino, English, math and science; BEC includes the Makabayan. There were numerous rationales behind the revision of the curriculum to include the Makabayan. One of the notable rationales with respect to the addition of computer technology is as follows: “... to increase each individual’s ability to cope in the fast-changing world. Likewise, to increase the time allotted for science, math, engineering, and to connect these subjects to the related areas.”

In the primary level, technology was not yet part of the curriculum. However, BEC includes the technology and livelihood education (TLE) at the secondary level, with 6 hours and 40 minutes devoted to the subject every week.

=== K-12 (2012–present) ===
Similar to BEC's implementation of the TLE, it is available after primary education (TLE starts at Grade 7). Exploratory Subjects are at 40 hours per quarter during Grades 7-8, while specializations are taken from Grades 9-12.

A sample list of courses for specializations in Information and Communications Technology is provided as follows:

- Animation - 320 hours
- Computer Programming (.NET Technology) - 320 hours
- Computer Programming (Java) - 320 hours
- Computer Programming (Oracle Database) - 320 hours
- Computer Systems Servicing - 640 hours
- Contact Center Services - 320 hours
- Illustration - 320 hours
- Medical Transcription - 320 hours
- Technical Drafting - 320 hours
- Broadband Installation (Fixed Wireless Systems) - 160 hours (Prerequisite: Computer Systems Servicing)
- Telecom OSP and Subscriber Line Installation (Copper Cable/POTS and DSL) - 320 hours (Prerequisite: Computer Systems Servicing)
- Telecom OSP Installation (Fiber Optic Cable) - 160 hours (Prerequisite: Computer Systems Servicing)

== Policies and government projects ==
The Philippine government especially the Department of Education and Department of Science and Technology has forwarded ICT educations through policies and projects. The Restructured Basic Education Curriculum which aimed to implement an interactive curriculum was launched in 2002. It aimed to integrate technology in instruction and in education, with great emphasis on computer literacy. To engage the private sector, The Act of 1998 (R.A. 8525) was passed to generate participation of companies. This was done in order to upgrade and modernize public schools, especially in the provinces. The program led to 110 public high schools receiving computers in 1996 under the DOST Engineering Science Education Project (ESEP). An additional 68 public high schools were recipients under the DOST Computer Literacy Program. Annually, DOST continues to allocate PHP 20,000,000 (US$400,000) to support buying computers in school. In 2002 and 2003, 125 public high schools were to be provided with 10 to 15 computers along with the corresponding teacher training programs.

Technology centres in each regions were set up as centres of excellence in information technology, crossing traditional boundaries, were established in order to focus on the needs of a greater number of learners. The centres were provided with computer laboratories fully equipped with printers, peripherals, projectors and air-conditioning units. Teacher training was also a component that was focused on. Funds were provided by the Philippine government for the first year of operation, while local government units were expected to continue the funding and maintenance.

Furthermore, the Department of Education has come up with programs to improve ICT education through streamline data collection. The department has also laid down rules and procedures that schools may follow to enhance ICT Education in the country. Schools are required to go through certain steps to acquire these.

The Learners' Information Systems (LIS) and Enhanced Basic Education Information Systems (EBEIS) are programs created by the Department of Education to help in the data gathering for current enrollees and available facilities in schools respectively. The Learning Resources Management and Development System (LRDMS) was implemented in order to support increased distribution and access to learning and teaching resources. The DepEd Computerization Program (DCP) was implemented to help schools participate in ICT-related programs.

=== Learners' Information System ===
The LIS is an online facility implemented by DepEd that records all registered students in public schools. This program was able to optimize the collecting data of registered public students and reduced the data collection time from 10 months to 3 months.

For public school personnel, the school principal and ICT coordinator shall be in charge of distributing user accounts to advisers to their appropriate sections. The homeroom adviser shall enrol all their registered students in their section. Incoming students for kindergarten and grade 1 students shall be issued new Learners Registration Number (LRN) by the system. For transferees from private schools, and other pupils enrolled but do not have LRN after checking the database shall be enrolled by the adviser into the LIS and submit their supporting documents to the Division Planning Unit (DPU). The DPU shall approve the issuance of a new LRN to a learner after documents have been checked and the learner does not have an existing LRN. Homeroom advisers shall update all learners’ data at the beginning of every school year.

Private school personnel is to use a separate form and link for submission. The DepEd Central Office shall build up the initial registry of all private school learners in the LIS but all succeeding updates of the master list will be done online through LIS online facility. The DepEd Central Office shall build up the initial registry of all private school learners in the LIS but all succeeding updates of the master list will be done online through the LIS online facility.

=== Enhanced Basic Education Information System ===
EBEIS is the data gathering program implemented by the DepEd that records the school's profile, and list of official enrollments from LIS.

For Government Elementary School Profile and Government Secondary School Profile (GESP/GSSP), they get:

- Pupil Data and Student Data:

This includes the number of late enrollees, pupils enrolled into the school after the cut-off date of July 31 and the number of continuing pupils and students who were enrolled in the Alternative Delivery Mode (ADM) and who have not yet completed the requirements for the grade/year level.

- Existing Number of Instructional Rooms in the School by Status:

Standard Rooms are rooms deemed to be safe and usable and having the standard dimensions as defined in the instructional rooms. This includes partially incomplete classroom constructions. Non-Standard or Makeshift Rooms are safe and usable rooms which are considered temporary structures to be used in classroom shortages and/or temporary shelter during emergencies.

- Number of Teachers by Teaching Assignment and by Year Level (GSSP only).

This indicates the number of nationally funded teachers by gender.

The school principals shall update all required school data for each incoming school years. After ensuring all required data have been accurately updated, they shall submit the profile into the system and the school will be able to download its GESP, GSSP, Private School Profile (PSP), or SUCs Laboratory School Profile which contains its official enrollment from LIS and school data from the EBEIS.

=== Learning Resources Management and Development System ===
The LRMDS is an online library created by international education partners and teachers. It is a web-based catalogue and online repository of learning, teaching, and professional development resources. It includes the following: information on quantity, quality, and location of textbooks and supplementary materials, and other teaching-learning resources; access to learning, teaching, and professional development resources in digital format; and standards, specifications, and guidelines for four subsystems: (1) Assessment and Evaluation; (2) Development, Acquisition, and Production; (3) Storage and Maintenance; and (4) Publication and Delivery.

=== DepEd Computerization Program ===
The DepEd Computerization Program was implemented to help supply the schools to be ready for training its students in basic ICT programs. This program contains two packages which contain models for a computer lab and an e-classroom. These models will be used in training the students in basic ICT programs in school. For schools with large enrollments, the following criteria will be followed: a minimum of 150 terminals for 9,000 enrollees, 50-100 terminals for 5000-8999 enrollees, and 50 terminals for 2000-4999 enrollees.

To be recipients of the DCP, public schools must have a stable and continuous supply of electricity preferably with telephone facilities; at least one teacher assigned to handle Computer Education classes, to manage the computer laboratory and willing to be trained on lab management; at least one teacher of each English, Science, and Math who are willing to be trained on pedagogy-technology to echo training to their colleagues; capacity to mobilize counterpart support from other stakeholders in the community for needed structures or facilities; never been recipient of computer from other similar government programs unless the equipment is due for replacement and augmentation; and strong partnership with other stakeholders to ensure sustainability of the program.

The Computer Lab Model shall include the following: 11 desktop PCs, 1 wireless broadband router, 11 uninterruptible power supply (UPS), 1 3-in-1 inkjet printer, and a set of face to face lecture and hands-on training basic software and hardware installation.

The E-Classroom Model shall include the following: 1 host PC, 6 - 17 inch LCD monitor, 6 keyboards and mouse, 2 desktop virtualization kit using shared computing technology, 1 UPS, 1 interactive whiteboard, 1 3-in-1 inkjet printer, 1 LCD projector, and a set of face to face lecture and hands-on training for all equipment mentioned.

=== DepEd Partnership Programs ===
Some notable external efforts also supported by DepEd are the PCs for Public Schools Project, Partners in Learning (PIL) IT Academy Laboratories, and Discounted PCs for Public School Teachers.

The PCs for Public Schools Project is a PHP 600 million yearly grant from the Japanese Government through DTI consisting of a package of 20 stand-alone computers per recipient school. The computer package shall be used solely for instructional purposes. The funds for maintenance, operating needs and other budgetary costs shall be ensured by recipient schools with local government units (LGUs), non-government organizations (NGOs), and/or the private sector.

Partners in Learning (PIL) IT Academy Laboratories is a DepEd project in partnership with Microsoft Philippines. It is Microsoft's global initiative for education to improve student performance through the integration of ICT in teaching and learning process. Grants have been provided to teachers in order to support ICT pilot projects. This program focuses on educating the teachers who will be introducing ICT to the current curriculum.

Data and information available show that the Philippines has eagerly embraced ICT in education. With facilitation by the Department of Education and collaboration with the private sector, several initiatives have successfully equipped a number of schools with ICT facilities. Nevertheless, the initiatives have not insured that teachers fully use the facilities for teaching purposes.

== Factors that affect ICT implementation ==
Numerous factors contribute to the integration of ICT in Philippine education. Some of whom are policymakers and educators. The government's role in ICT education is to create a framework and exercise decision making with regards to all aspects of implementing programs. As for educators, their task is to implement the educational policies and programs in ICT education. Teachers have a vital role of effectively and appropriately using technology in educational institutions.

In order to ensure that success factors in the frameworks are all satisfied DepEd implemented systems and programs that would aid in improving competency, provision of equipment and ease of access to online material, the following factors are the e-learning success factors used as frameworks for ICT implementations in developing countries:

- Instructors’ Characteristics

Instructors play an important role in teaching the students and must be well trained in order to achieve effectiveness in ICT programs. The use of technology and/or implementation of ICT impacts educational learning outcomes. The general characteristics of the instructor's teaching methods also fall under this factor.

- E-learning Environment

This pertains to the students’ access to online resources, online systems for access to curriculum and communication, tutoring and assessment. A positive e-learning environment encourages students to interact with their instructors to achieve the maximum benefit from e-learning outcomes.

- Institution and Service Quality

Providing support, equipment, and training are the key qualities of this success criteria. Administrative concerns such as management, funding, maintenance, and the delivery of resources also fall under service quality.

- Infrastructure and System Quality

System quality concerns itself with facilitating interactions, organization and collection of data. Factors that are relevant for infrastructure and system quality include Internet quality, facilitating conditions, reliability, ease of use, system functionality, system interactivity, system response, and equipment accessibility.

- Course and Information Quality

Course quality focuses on well-designed courses, curriculum, and learning materials facilitate meaningful educational experiences. Information quality is about the data's accuracy, relevance, consistency and timeliness.
