= Boxing at the 2004 Summer Olympics – Middleweight =

Middleweight boxing at the Games of the XXVIII Olympiad
- Venue: Peristeri Olympic Boxing Hall
- Date: 14–28 August 2004
- Competitors: 28 from 28 nations

Medalists
1st place, gold medalist(s)		Gaydarbek Gaydarbekov	Russia
2nd place, silver medalist(s)		Gennady Golovkin	Kazakhstan
3rd place, bronze medalist(s)		Suriya Prasathinphimai	Thailand
3rd place, bronze medalist(s)		Andre Dirrell	United States

The middleweight boxing competition at the 2004 Summer Olympics in Athens was held from 14 to 28 August at Peristeri Olympic Boxing Hall. This is limited to those boxers weighing between 69 and 75 kilograms.

== Competition format ==
Like all Olympic boxing events, the competition was a straight single-elimination tournament. This event consisted of 28 boxers who have qualified for the competition through various tournaments held in 2003 and 2004. The competition began with a preliminary round on 14 August, where the number of competitors was reduced to 16, and concluded with the final on 28 August. As there were fewer than 32 boxers in the competition, a number of boxers received a bye through the preliminary round. Both semi-final losers were awarded bronze medals.

All bouts consisted of four rounds of two minutes each, with one-minute breaks between rounds. Punches scored only if the white area on the front of the glove made full contact with the front of the head or torso of the opponent. Five judges scored each bout; three of the judges had to signal a scoring punch within one second for the punch to score. The winner of the bout was the boxer who scored the most valid punches by the end of the bout.

== Schedule ==
All times are Greece Standard Time (UTC+2)

Date	Time	Round
Saturday, 14 August 2004	13:30 & 19:30	Round of 32
Saturday, 21 August 2004	13:30 & 19:30	Round of 16
Wednesday, 25 August 2004	19:30	Quarterfinals
Friday, 27 August 2004	13:30	Semifinals
Saturday, 28 August 2004	19:30	Final

== Qualifying athletes ==
Athlete	Country
Ahmed Ali Khan	Pakistan
Gennady Golovkin	Kazakhstan
Ramadan Yasser	Egypt
Marian Simion	Romania
Nabil Kassel	Algeria
Glaucelio Abreu	Brazil
Andre Dirrell	United States
Ha Dabateer	China
Yordanis Despaigne	Cuba
Jean Pascal	Canada
Károly Balzsay	Hungary
Mohamed Sahraoui	Tunisia
Gaydarbek Gaydarbekov	Russia
Christopher Camat	Philippines
Sherzod Abdurahmonov	Uzbekistan
Serdar Ustuner	Turkey
Andy Lee	Ireland
Alfredo Angulo	Mexico
Hassan N'Dam N'Jikam	Cameroon
Juan Ubaldo	Dominican Republic
Javid Taghiyev	Azerbaijan
Georgios Gazis	Greece
Suriya Prasathinphimai	Thailand
Joseph Lubega	Uganda
Lukas Wilaschek	Germany
Jamie Pittman	Australia
Oleg Mashkin	Ukraine
Khotso Motau	South Africa

== Results ==
Round of 32
Nabil Kassel (ALG)	41
Glaucelio Abreu (BRA)	36
Andre Dirrell (USA)	25
Ha Dabateer (CHN)	18
Yordanis Despaigne (CUB)	36
Jean Pascal (CAN)	24
Károly Balzsay (HUN)	29
Mohammed Sahraoui (TUN)	24
Gaydarbek Gaydarbekov (RUS)	35
Christopher Camat (PHI)	13
Sherzod Abdurahmonov (UZB)	34
Serdar Ustuner (TUR)	16
Andy Lee (IRL)	38
Alfredo Angulo (MEX)	23
Hassan N'Dam N'Jikam (CMR)	22+
Juan Ubaldo (DOM)	22
Javid Taghiyev (AZE)	32
Georgios Gazis (GRE)	31
Suriya Prasathinphimai (THA)	30
Joseph Lubega (UGA)	21
Lukas Wilaschek (GER)	24
Jamie Pittman (AUS)	23
Oleg Mashkin (UKR)	25
Khotso Motau (RSA)	22

Round of 16
Ahmed Ali Khan (PAK)	10
Gennady Golovkin (KAZ)	31
Ramadan Yasser (EGY)	36
Marian Simion (ROU)	24
Nabil Kassel (ALG)
Andre Dirrell (USA)	RSC
Yordanis Despaigne (CUB)	38
Károly Balzsay (HUN)	25
Gaydarbek Gaydarbekov (RUS)	33
Sherzod Abdurahmonov (UZB)	19
Andy Lee (IRL)	27
Hassan N'Dam N'Jikam (CMR)	27+
Javid Taghiyev (AZE)	19
Suriya Prasathinphimai (THA)	19+
Lukas Wilaschek (GER)	24
Oleg Mashkin (UKR)	34

Quarterfinals
Gennady Golovkin (KAZ)	31
Ramadan Yasser (EGY)	20
Andre Dirrell (USA)	12
Yordanis Despaigne (CUB)	11
Gaydarbek Gaydarbekov (RUS)	26
Hassan N'Dam N'Jikam (CMR)	13
Suriya Prasathinphimai (THA)	28
Oleg Mashkin (UKR)	22

Semifinals
Gennady Golovkin (KAZ)	23
Andre Dirrell (USA)	18
Gaydarbek Gaydarbekov (RUS)	24
Suriya Prasathinphimai (THA)	18

Finals
Gennady Golovkin (KAZ)	18
Gaydarbek Gaydarbekov (RUS)	28
