= Boxing at the 2002 Asian Games – Men's 71 kg =

Boxing competitions

Men's 71 kg at the 2002 Asian Games
- Venue: Masan Gymnasium
- Date: 4–13 October 2002
- Competitors: 14 from 14 nations

Medalists
gold medal	Gennady Golovkin	Kazakhstan
silver medal	Suriya Prasathinphimai	Thailand
bronze medal	Song In-joon	South Korea
bronze medal	Sirojiddin Naimov	Uzbekistan

The men's light middleweight (71 kilograms) event at the 2002 Asian Games took place from 4 to 13 October 2002 at Masan Gymnasium, Masan, South Korea.

== Schedule ==
All times are Korea Standard Time (UTC+09:00)

Date	Time	Event
Friday, 4 October 2002	14:00	Preliminary
Tuesday, 8 October 2002	14:00	Quarterfinals
Friday, 11 October 2002	14:00	Semifinals
Sunday, 13 October 2002	14:00	Final

== Results ==
Legend

- RET — Won by retirement
- RSCH — Won by referee stop contest head blow
- RSCO — Won by referee stop contest outclassed
- WO — Won by walkover

Preliminary
Nagimeldin Adam (QAT)	25
Sandagsürengiin Erdenebayar (MGL)	17
Abdullah Shekib (AFG)
Gennady Golovkin (KAZ)	RET
Sirojiddin Naimov (UZB)	WO
Subarna Sapkota (NEP)
Ha Dabateer (CHN)	RSCO
Koja Sato (JPN)
Suriya Prasathinphimai (THA)	14
Regues Feros Christoper (INA)	7
Christopher Camat (PHI)	11
Kashif Mumtaz (PAK)	18

Quarterfinals
Song In-joon (KOR)	22
Kymbatbek Ryskulov (KGZ)	6
Nagimeldin Adam (QAT)
Gennady Golovkin (KAZ)	RSCO
Sirojiddin Naimov (UZB)	RSCO
Ha Dabateer (CHN)
Suriya Prasathinphimai (THA)	RSCH
Kashif Mumtaz (PAK)

Semifinals
Song In-joon (KOR)	12
Gennady Golovkin (KAZ)	18
Sirojiddin Naimov (UZB)
Suriya Prasathinphimai (THA)	RSCH

Final
Gennady Golovkin (KAZ)	RSCO
Suriya Prasathinphimai (THA)
