= Dmitry Pirog =

Russian boxers

Dmitry Pirog Дмитрий Пирог
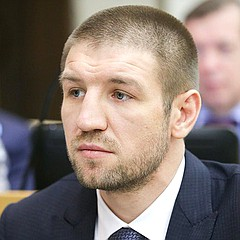
- Pirog in 2018

Personal information
- Nickname: The Grandmaster
- Nationality: Russian
- Born: Dmitry Yurievich Pirog; 27 June 1980 (age 46) Temryuk, Russian SFSR, Soviet Union (now Russia)
- Height: 1.85 m (6 ft 1 in)
- Weight: Middleweight

Boxing career
- Reach: 178 cm (70 in)
- Stance: Orthodox

Boxing record
- Total fights: 20
- Wins: 20
- Win by KO: 15

Dmitry Yurievich Pirog (Russian: Дмитрий Юрьевич Пирог; born 27 June 1980) is a Russian politician and former professional boxer. In boxing he competed from 2005 to 2012, and held the World Boxing Organization (WBO) middleweight title from 2010 to 2012. Although his career was cut short due to a debilitating back injury, he is one of the few professional boxers to win a world championship and retire undefeated.

== Early life and amateur career ==
At the age of eight, Pirog was a keen chess player and won some tournaments in the town of Temryuk, Russia. However, he soon felt as though he was not getting enough activity from chess, and decided to seek a sport instead. At his local gym, he discovered boxing and began fighting as an amateur, having relocated to the city of Krasnodar. At the early stages of his amateur career he didn't have a trainer, instead he studied carefully VHS tapes of Sugar Ray Leonard and later Floyd Mayweather Jr., which affected his style heavily. In his amateur career, Pirog claims to have won 200 fights and lost 30, all of which prepared him for the professional ranks.

== Professional career ==
=== Early career ===
Pirog made his professional debut on 29 July 2005, scoring a sixth-round technical knockout over fellow debutant Sasun Oganyan. On his fourth fight, he defeated Sergey Tatevosyan to become the Russian national middleweight champion. Tatevosyan was an experienced veteran and gave Pirog a tough fight, but Pirog's skills ultimately prevailed and he won a unanimous decision 98–91, 98–93, and 97–95. From late 2007 to early 2010, Pirog won many regional and international middleweight titles from both the WBC and WBO.

=== WBO middleweight champion ===
Pirog's first world title shot arrived on 31 July 2010, against fellow undefeated prospect Daniel Jacobs, with the vacant WBO middleweight title on the line. The belt had last belonged to Sergio Martínez, who was stripped due to not complying with the WBO's rules. Pirog came in as a relatively unknown contender to American audiences, while Jacobs had the overwhelming backing of manager Al Haymon and promoters Golden Boy, as well as a very high knockout percentage. Jacobs started the fight well and was ahead by 39–37 on all scorecards by round four. However, Pirog managed to hurt Jacobs with a right hand. In the fifth round of the fight, Pirog scored a major upset when he knocked Jacobs down with a hard right hand. Jacobs was unable to get back up and the referee waved off the fight, giving Pirog a knockout win and making him the new WBO middleweight champion. After the fight, Pirog said "After the second round, I knew I was good. I hurt him in the second and I knew I could come back and do it again."

Pirog's exposure to worldwide audiences grew overnight, as the fight took place on HBO pay-per-view as part of the undercard to Juan Manuel Márquez vs. Juan Díaz II. However, in his subsequent two years as champion, Pirog only managed to make three defences, the last of which took place on 1 May 2012. In this fight, Pirog scored a wide unanimous decision, with scores of 120–108, 119–109, and 117–111, against Nobuhiro Ishida.

=== Injury and retirement ===
On 25 August 2012, Pirog was stripped of his title by the WBO after choosing to fight WBA and IBO middleweight champion Gennady Golovkin instead of WBO interim champion Hassan N'Dam N'Jikam. During training for the Golovkin fight, Pirog suffered a serious back injury—a ruptured disc—which forced cancellation of the fight. Several comeback attempts by Pirog to face Golovkin on an HBO pay-per-view main event were thwarted by ongoing back problems, effectively forcing his premature retirement.

== Personal life ==
Pirog is a diploma graduate of Kuban State University and holds a managerial boxing license. Some of the boxers he has managed include Fedor Papazov and Vasily Lepikhin. In 2010, Pirog was the vice president of the Professional Boxing Federation in the Southern Federal District of Russia.

== Political career ==
In March 2017, Pirog replaced Alexander Metkin in the State Duma, the Russian lower house, representing governing party United Russia.

=== Sanctions ===
Pirog was sanctioned by the British government in 2022 in relation to the Russo-Ukrainian War. He was also sanctioned by the United States Treasury on 24 March 2022.

== Professional boxing record ==
20 fights	20 wins	0 losses
By knockout	15	0
By decision	5	0

No.	Result	Record	Opponent	Type	Round, time	Date	Location	Notes
20	Win	20–0	Nobuhiro Ishida	UD	12	1 May 2012	Krylatskoye Sports Palace, Moscow, Russia	Retained WBO middleweight title
19	Win	19–0	Gennady Martirosyan	RTD	10 (12), 3:00	25 Sep 2011	Sports Palace Olymp, Krasnodar, Russia	Retained WBO middleweight title
18	Win	18–0	Javier Maciel	UD	12	26 Mar 2011	Palace of Sporting Games, Yekaterinburg, Russia	Retained WBO middleweight title
17	Win	17–0	Daniel Jacobs	KO	5 (12), 0:57	31 Jul 2010	Mandalay Bay Events Center, Paradise, Nevada, US	Won vacant WBO middleweight title
16	Win	16–0	Sergei Melis	TKO	6 (10), 2:42	27 Apr 2010	Yubileyny Sports Palace, Saint Petersburg, Russia	Won WBC Baltic middleweight title
15	Win	15–0	Eric Mitchell	TKO	5 (12), 1:07	6 Feb 2010	Aquarium Hotel, Myakinino, Russia	Retained WBO Asia Pacific middleweight title
14	Win	14–0	Kofi Jantuah	UD	12	26 Jun 2009	Völklingen, Saarland, Germany	Won vacant WBC International middleweight title
13	Win	13–0	Kuvanych Toygonbayev	RTD	5 (12), 3:00	6 Dec 2008	Circus, Nizhny Novgorod, Russia	Retained ABCO and WBO Asia Pacific middleweight titles
12	Win	12–0	Geard Ajetovic	UD	10	19 Jul 2008	Olimpyskiy Sports Palace, Chekhov, Russia	
11	Win	11–0	Aslanbek Kodzoev	KO	4 (12), 1:27	12 Apr 2008	Palace of UGMC, Verkhnyaya Pyshma, Russia	Retained ABCO middleweight title; Won vacant WBO Asia Pacific middleweight title
10	Win	10–0	Alexey Chirkov	RTD	2 (12), 3:00	25 Oct 2007	Casino Vodoley, Ekaterinburg, Russia	Won vacant ABCO middleweight title
9	Win	9–0	Aliaksandr Vaiavoda	TKO	9 (10)	2 Jun 2007	Hotel Olimp, Krasnodar, Russia	Won vacant CISBB middleweight title
8	Win	8–0	Juan Manuel Alaggio	TKO	4 (10)	24 Mar 2007	FK Yunost, Kaliningrad, Russia	
7	Win	7–0	Rodrigues Moungo	TKO	1 (6), 2:54	10 Dec 2006	Olympic Stadium, Moscow, Russia	
6	Win	6–0	Zviadi Purtskhvanidze	RTD	5 (10), 3:00	25 Oct 2006	Casino Crystall, Moscow, Russia	Retained Russia middleweight title
5	Win	5–0	Islam Yusupov	TKO	2 (10)	17 Jul 2006	Akademia, Gelendzhik, Russia	
4	Win	4–0	Sergey Tatevosyan	UD	10	16 Apr 2006	Casino Crystall, Moscow, Russia	Won vacant Russia middleweight title
3	Win	3–0	Sergey Gribkov	TKO	3 (6)	23 Dec 2005	Vityaz Podolsk, Russia	
2	Win	2–0	Denis Balandin	RTD	3 (6), 3:00	4 Nov 2005	Stavropol, Russia	
1	Win	1–0	Sasun Oganyan	TKO	6 (6)	29 Jul 2005	Gelendzhik, Russia	

== See also ==
- List of middleweight boxing champions
- List of WBO world champions
- List of undefeated boxing world champions

Sporting positions
Regional boxing titles
Vacant Title last held by Sergey Khomitsky	Russia middleweight champion 16 April 2006 – October 2007; Vacated	Vacant Title next held by Gennady Martirosyan
Vacant Title last held by Sergey Khomitsky	CISBB middleweight champion 2 June 2007 – October 2007; Vacated	Vacant Title next held by Sandor Micsko
New title	ABCO middleweight champion 16 April 2006 – June 26, 2009; Won International title	Vacant Title next held by Pradeep Singh
Vacant Title last held by Jamie Pittman	WBO Asia Pacific middleweight champion 16 April 2006 – 31 July 2010; Won world title	Vacant Title next held by Les Sherrington
Vacant Title last held by Domenico Spada	WBC International middleweight champion 26 June 2009 – June 2010; Vacated	Vacant Title next held by David Lemieux
Vacant Title last held by Sergei Melis	WBC Baltic middleweight champion 27 April 2010 – July 2010; Vacated	Vacant Title next held by Daniel Urbanski
World boxing titles
Vacant Title last held by Sergio Martínez stripped	WBO middleweight champion 31 July 2010 – 25 August 2012; Stripped	Succeeded by Hassan N'Dam N'Jikam
