= Gaydarbek Gaydarbekov =

Russian boxer (born 1976)

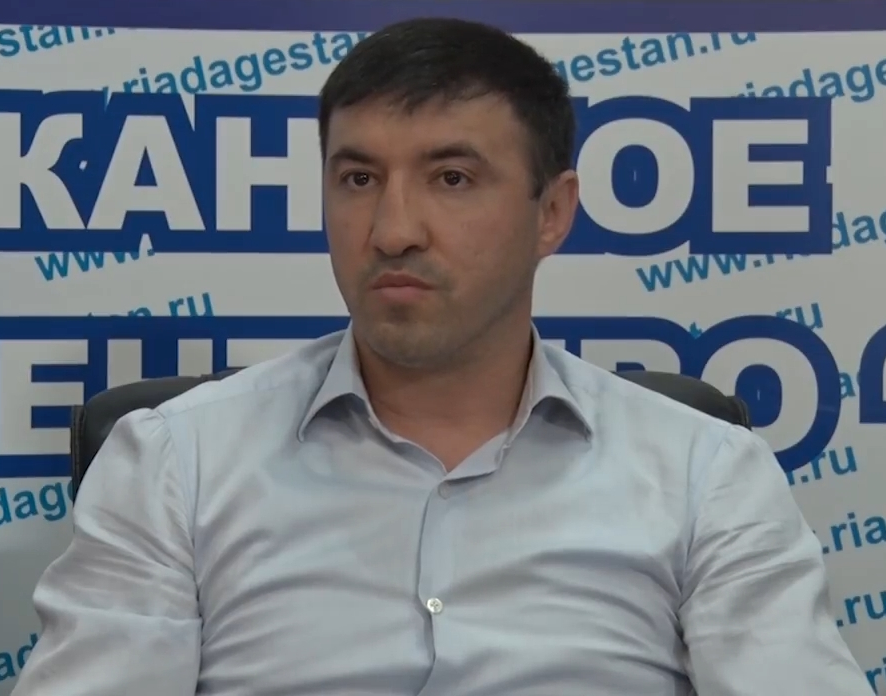
- Gaydarbek Gaydarbekov in July 2017

Personal information
- Native name: Гайдарбек Абдулович Гайдарбеков
- Full name: Gaydarbek Abdulayevich Gaydarbekov
- Nationality: Russian
- Born: October 6, 1976 (age 49) Kaspiysk, Dagestan ASSR, Russian SFSR, Soviet Union
- Height: 1.83 m (6 ft 0 in)
- Weight: 75 kg (165 lb)

Sport
- Sport: Boxing
- Weight class: Middleweight
- Club: Dynamo, Kaspiyusk
Medal record
Men's amateur boxing
Representing Russia
Olympic Games
Gold medal – first place	2004 Athens	Middleweight
Silver medal – second place	2000 Sydney	Middleweight
European Championships
Gold medal – first place	2004 Pula	Middleweight

Gaydarbek Abdulovich Gaydarbekov (Russian: Гайдарбек Абдулович Гайдарбеков) (born October 6, 1976) is a Russian boxer who has won two Olympic medals in Middleweight, including the gold medal at the 2004 games. He qualified for the Athens Olympics by winning the 2004 European Amateur Boxing Championships in Pula, Croatia. Today he is perhaps best known for defeating future boxing superstar Gennady Golovkin, from Kazakhstan, in the 2004 Olympic finals. Despite his brilliant amateur pedigree, he never turned professional.

At the 2000 Summer Olympics, he got the silver medal after losing 15–17 in a closely contested final against Cuba's Jorge Gutiérrez.

== Amateur highlights ==
- Russian Champion 1999, 2001 and 2002
- 1994 2nd place as a Flyweight at the Junior World Championships in Istanbul, Turkey. Results were:
  - Defeated A. Kopanov (Kazakhstan) PTS (15–2)
  - Defeated A. Mahdi (Algeria) DSQ-2
  - Defeated Borislav Nikolov (Bulgaria) RSC-2
  - Defeated Jesus Vega (USA) PTS (11–8)
  - Lost to Alexander Jimenez (Cuba) PTS (3–11)
- 1998 2nd place as a Light Middleweight at the Goodwill Games in New York. Results were:
  - Defeated Mohamed Hikal (Egypt) PTS (8–1)
  - Defeated Jermain Taylor (USA) PTS (13–9)
  - Lost to Juan Hernández Sierra (Cuba) PTS (5–16)
- 2001 won the Goodwill Games in Brisbane, Australia. Results were:
  - Defeated Utkirbek Haydarov (Uzbekistan) RSC-1
  - Defeated Paul Miller (Australia) PTS (9–5)
- 2004 won the European Championships in Pula, Croatia. Beat Lukas Wilaschek (Germany) in the final.

== Olympic results ==
2000 Olympics

- Defeated Utkirbek Haydarov (Uzbekistan) 11–10
- Defeated Eromosele Albert (Nigeria) 19–9
- Defeated Jeff Lacy (USA) TKO 3
- Defeated Zsolt Erdei (Hungary) 24–16
- Lost to Jorge Gutiérrez (Cuba) 15–17

2004 Olympics

- Defeated Christopher Camat (Philippines) 35–13
- Defeated Sherzod Abdurahmonov (Uzbekistan) 33–19
- Defeated Hassan Ndam Njikam (Cameroon) 26–13
- Defeated Suriya Prasathinphimai (Thailand) 24–18
- Defeated Gennady Golovkin (Kazakhstan) 28-18
