= Javid Taghiyev (boxer) =

Azerbaijani boxer

Personal information
- Born: 6 October 1981 (age 44)
Medal record
Men's Boxing
Representing Azerbaijan
European Amateur Championships
Bronze medal – third place	2004 Pula	Middleweight

Javid Taghiyev (Azerbaijani: Cavid Tağıyev; born 6 October 1981, in Lankaran) is a retired boxer from Azerbaijan.

He participated in the 2004 Summer Olympics for his native European country. There he was stopped in the second round of the Middleweight (75 kg) division by Thailand's eventual bronze medalist Suriya Prasathinphimai.

Taghiyev won the bronze medal in the same division six months earlier, at the 2004 European Amateur Boxing Championships in Pula, Croatia.

After retiring from boxing, Taghiyev moved to Iraq, where he professionally trains local boxers.
