= Nabil Kassel =

Algerian boxer (born 1984)

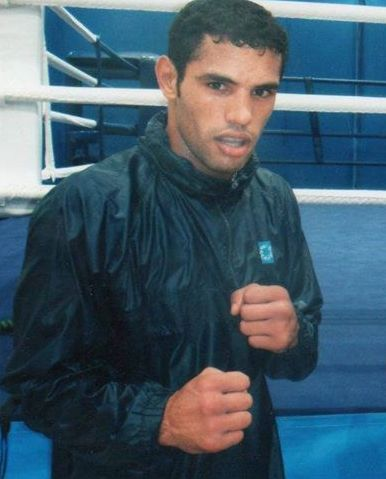

Personal information
- Full name: نبيل كاسيل
- Nationality: Algeria
- Born: March 10, 1984 (age 42)
- Height: 1.82 m (6 ft 0 in)
- Weight: 75 kg (165 lb)

Sport
- Sport: Boxing
- Weight class: Middleweight
Medal record
All-Africa Games
Bronze medal – third place	2003 Abuja	Middleweight
Gold medal – first place	2007 Algiers	Middleweight

Nabil Kassel (born March 10, 1984) is an Algerian boxer best known for winning the middleweight gold at the 2007 All-Africa Games. The family name is Kassel, Algerians generally write this first (Kassel Nabil).

== Career ==
Kassel participated at the 2004 Olympics at the age of 19 but lost to southpaw American Andre Dirrell by RSC-2. He qualified for the Athens Games by winning the gold medal at the 2nd AIBA African 2004 Olympic Qualifying Tournament in Gaborone, Botswana. In the final he defeated Tunisia's Mohamed Sahraoui.

He won the 2005 African Championships, and was a member of the team that competed for Africa at the 2005 Boxing World Cup in Moscow, Russia. .

At the Arab Championships 2007 he lost to Mohammed Hikal.

At the All-African Games he beat Hikal 17:15 in the first round and won.

He later qualified for the Olympics. At the qualifier he lost again to veteran Hikal but beat Daniel Shishia for the third spot. At the Olympics he lost to Darren Sutherland.
