= Jamie Pittman =

Australian boxer

Personal information
- Nickname: Mr. Business
- Nationality: Indigenous Australian
- Born: Jamie Michael Pittman; 18 July 1981 (age 45) Brisbane, Queensland, Australia
- Height: 1.86 m (6 ft 1 in)
- Weight: Middleweight

Boxing career
- Stance: Southpaw

Boxing record
- Total fights: 25
- Wins: 22
- Win by KO: 7
- Losses: 3
- Draws: 0
- No contests: 0

Jamie Michael Pittman (born 18 July 1981) is a professional Australian indigenous boxer in the middleweight division.

Representing Australia at the 2004 Summer Olympics, he finished his amateur career with 150 wins 37 losses from 187 fights before turning pro the following year, after which he held a record of twenty-five bouts throughout his professional career (22 victories, 11 knockouts and three losses).

In November 2021, Pittman was appointed as Boxing Australia's National Coach.

In April 2024, Pittman was found by National Sports Tribunal to have committed a large number of offences relating to sexual misconduct involving female fighters between 16 July 2023 and 26 October 2023 which Pittman admitted to and apologised for. Consequently, he withdrew from the 2024 Olympic Games and also stood down from the Australian Olympic Committee's Indigenous Advisory Committee.

== Amateur career ==
Pittman started boxing as a form of rehabilitation at the age of ten, when he fell through the window that left him with 72 stitches in his arm. Since then, he trained most of his sporting career for the Newcastle PCYC in Newcastle, New South Wales, and was later selected to be a member of the boxing team under the Australian Institute of Sport in Canberra. Pittman sought his official bid to compete for the host nation at the 2000 Summer Olympics in Sydney, but the match was called off during the AIBA Oceania Qualification Tournament, because of a controversial decision. According to him, he got a cut under his eye, which doctors presumed that was counted as a punch from the opponent.

Pittman represented Australia at the 2002 Commonwealth Games. In his first bout, he defeated Hassan Mraba Mzonge of Tanzania but lost his quarterfinal contest to Jean Pascal of Canada. Pittman won 3 fights in 3 days to Win the gold medal at the 2003 Commonwealth Championships, beating Eamonn_OKane from Northern Ireland in the final. Pittman then qualified for the men's middleweight division (75 kg) at the 2004 Summer Olympics in Athens. Having trained eight years for his Olympic debut in Sydney and missed out, he bounced back to guarantee a spot on the Australian boxing team after finishing first in the AIBA Oceania Qualification Tournament in Tonga. Pittman suffered a contentious one-point defeat to Germany's Lukas Wilaschek with a tough 24–23 decision in his opening match.

== Professional career ==
Shortly after the Games, Pittman turned himself into pro in 2005. Because of his unorthodox athleticism, tremendous amateur tactics, and daunting fists to punish his opponents, he was considered one of the young prospects in boxing. As of August 2014, Pittman obtains a combined record of twenty-two victories (8 KO) in twenty-five professional bouts with three defeats.

At the peak of his pro career, Pittman campaigned his defence with PABA and WBA Asia Pacific middleweight titles to establish an impressive 15–0 boxing record, until he swiftly moved into the super middleweight division three years after his pro debut.

On 5 April 2008, Pittman faced three-time defending WBA super middleweight champion Felix Sturm in Düsseldorf, Germany. He enjoyed his early success at the start of the match with two straight victories over Sturm upon the decision of the judges. After two rounds, Pittman continued to box Sturm with another quick punch, but his opponent rocked him at the very end with his right eye being severely cut. As the fight sustained in the fifth round, Sturm took control of the ring and knocked Pittman down with a body shot. With only 36 seconds left into the seventh round, he was floored and battered again by Sturm with a flurry of punches until referee Russell Mora stepped in to halt the fight, declaring Sturm a champion in a one-sided defence of his WBA middleweight title. Nevertheless, Pittman claimed a professional defeat in his sporting career for the first time, since he captained the Australian team at the Olympics.

Following his first-ever defeat in pro career, Pittman bounced back to earn three boxing bouts and generated a boxing record of 18–1. In early 2010, Pittman's game plan had been overwhelmed with another debacle, after being knocked out by Ghana's Joseph Kwadjo for the IBF Australasian super middleweight title during the seventh round of their match at Le Montage Reception Centre in Sydney.

In 2011, Pittman lost the PABA super middleweight title to fellow Australian boxer Serge Yannick in an unprecedented second round of their match in Hobart, Tasmania. Two years later, Pittman restored his form in the boxing scene with a clinical shutout over Zac Awad in the eighth round of their match, and ultimately clinched the PABA super middleweight title at the Sydney Entertainment Centre, hastening his pro record to 22–3 (8 KO).

== Professional boxing record ==
22 Wins (8 knockouts, 14 decisions), 3 Losses, 0 Draws
Res.	Record	Opponent	Type	Round	Date	Location	Notes
Win	22–3	(Australia) Zac Awad	UD	8 (8)	2013-01-30	(Australia) Sydney Entertainment Centre, Sydney	
Loss	21–3	(Australia) Serge Yannick	TKO	2 (12)	2011-08-31	Derwent Entertainment Centre, Hobart, Tasmania, Australia	PABA super middleweight title
Win	21–2	(Australia) Tim Kanofski	UD	6 (6)	2011-01-29	Gold Coast Convention Centre, Broadbeach, Queensland, Australia	
Win	20–2	(Samoa) Togasilimai Letoa	UD	6 (6)	2010-10-31	State Sports Centre, Homebush, New South Wales, Australia	
Loss	19–2	(Ghana) Joseph Kwadjo	KO	7 (12)	2010-04-08	Le Montage Reception Centre, Lilyfield, New South Wales, Australia	IBF Australasia super middleweight title
Win	19–1	(Australia) Frank Ciampa	UD	6 (6)	2009-07-26	Town Hall, Melbourne, Australia	
Win	18–1	(Australia) Josh Clenshaw	UD	8 (8)	2009-02-20	Newcastle Panthers Club, Newcastle, New South Wales, Australia	
Win	17–1	(Argentina) Eduardo Rojas	TKO	2 (6)	2008-11-07	Central Coast Leagues Club, Gosford, New South Wales, Australia	
Loss	16–1	(Germany) Felix Sturm	TKO	7 (12)	2008-04-05	Burg-Wächter Castello, Düsseldorf, Germany	WBA middleweight title
Win	16–0	(Indonesia) Andreas Seran	UD	12 (12)	2007-11-26	Iguana's Bar & Brasserie, Gosford, New South Wales, Australia	PABA middleweight title
Win	15–0	(South Africa) Tshepo Mashego	UD	12 (12)	2007-09-14	RSL Club, Davistown, New South Wales, Australia	
Win	14–0	(Philippines) Nonoy Gonzales	UD	12 (12)	2007-09-14	Crowne Plaza Hotel, Terrigal, New South Wales, Australia	WBO Asia Pacific middleweight title
Win	13–0	(Thailand) Komgrit Nanakorn	UD	6 (6)	2007-04-27	Magic Millions Complex, Gold Coast, Queensland, Australia	
Win	12–0	(South Africa) William Gare	TD	8 (12)	2006-11-24	Crowne Plaza Hotel, Terrigal, New South Wales, Australia	WBF super middleweight title
Win	11–0	(New Zealand) Paz Viejo	TKO	2 (12)	2006-10-20	Bundamba Basketball Stadium, Ipswich, Queensland, Australia	
Win	10–0	(Thailand) Somchai Chimlum	TKO	4 (6)	2006-08-04	Magic Millions Complex, Gold Coast, Queensland, Australia	
Win	9–0	(Thailand) Anont Donpradith	UD	6 (6)	2006-06-09	Southport RSL Club, Southport, Queensland, Australia	
Win	8–0	(Thailand) Dechapon Suwunnalird	UD	6 (6)	2006-05-12	Aquatic Bar & Grill, Tweed Heads South, New South Wales, Australia	
Win	7–0	(Australia) Les Sherrington	KO	4 (10)	2006-03-03	Royal Pines Resort, Gold Coast, Queensland, Australia	Australian super middleweight title
Win	6–0	(Thailand) Saiseelek Chanthanyakarn	TKO	2 (8)	2005-09-08	Panthers World of Entertainment, Penrith, New South Wales, Australia	
Win	5–0	(Australia) Peter Brennan	KO	1 (6)	2005-09-02	Club Nova, Newcastle, New South Wales, Australia	
Win	4–0	(New Zealand) Gerrard Zohs	KO	2 (6)	2005-07-23	Tuggerah Lakes Memorial Club, The Entrance, New South Wales, Australia	
Win	3–0	(Australia) Clint Johnson	KO	3 (5)	2005-05-13	Central Coast Leagues Club, Gosford, New South Wales, Australia	
Win	2–0	(Australia) Peter Brennan	UD	6 (6)	2005-03-27	State Sports Centre, Homebush, New South Wales, Australia	
Win	1–0	(Australia) Sean Connell	UD	6 (6)	2004-11-09	Blacktown RSL Club, Blacktown, New South Wales, Australia	

== Coaching career ==
Since fighting professionally, Pittman has been focussed on coaching existing and new Australian talent as part of Team Business working with both elite and pro athletes on the Central Coast (New South Wales), including Kaye Scott and Tyson Lantry. He is currently the National Regional Development Coach and the head of talent identification and development for Boxing Australia. Pittman's coaching experience includes being the Australian Assistant Coach at the AIBA World Junior Championships in Russia 2015 and Australian Assistant Coach at the AIBA Youth World Boxing Championships where Australia won a gold and a bronze medal. Pittman has Coached at 2 @ufc tournaments and in 2019 was named the National Futures Coach for Boxing Australia.

=== Sexual misconduct findings ===
In April 2024, Pittman admitted to and apologised for sexual misconduct involving female fighters. At the National Sports Tribunal, Pittman was found to have committed a large number of offences between 16 July 2023 and 26 October 2023, with his conduct being described by the tribunal as "disgusting", "inappropriate" and "offensive".

Pittman admitted to the code of conduct breaches, which consisted of 11 separate incidents across two separate team camps following overseas tours organised by the Combat Institute of Australia, with one incident in particular being described as "a sexually lewd act in the presence of a female athlete under Mr Pittman's care". The tribunal also stated that most of the incidents involved "inappropriate comments or conduct involving the sexual objectification of women that is puerile, infantile and lacking in sensitivity or awareness".

During the hearing, Pittman said he felt ashamed and embarrassed and accepted that certain comments were inappropriate. He also said he would not be contesting the findings. The tribunal recommended a six-month ban backdated to November 2023, and for Pittman to apologise in writing to a physiotherapist and at least two athletes. Pittman subsequently withdrew from the 2024 Olympic Games and stood down from the Australian Olympic Committee's Indigenous Advisory Panel.
