= Sherzod Abdurahmonov =

Uzbekistani boxer (born 1982)

Personal information
- Full name: Sherzod Abdurahmonov
- Nationality: Uzbekistan
- Born: January 12, 1982 (age 44)
- Height: 1.78 m (5 ft 10 in)
- Weight: 73 kg (161 lb)

Sport
- Sport: Boxing
- Weight class: Middleweight
Medal record
Asian Championships
Bronze medal – third place	2005 Ho Chi Minh City	Middleweight

Sherzod Abdurahmonov (born January 12, 1982) is an Uzbekistani boxer. He represented his country at the 2004 Summer Olympics. There he was stopped in the quarterfinals of the Men's Middleweight (– 75 kg) division by Russia's eventual runner-up Gaydarbek Gaydarbekov. He qualified for the Athens Games by ending up in second place at the 1st AIBA Asian 2004 Olympic Qualifying Tournament in Guangzhou, China. In the final he lost to China's Ha Dabateer.

== Notes ==
- sports-reference
