= Hany Atiyo =

Egyptian former professional boxer

Personal information
- Nickname: Egyptian Hurricane
- Nationality: Egyptian
- Born: Hany Atiya Ramadan; 8 November 1983 (age 42) Kafr El Sheikh, Egypt
- Height: 6 ft 2 1/2 in
- Weight: Light-heavyweight; Cruiserweight

Boxing career
- Stance: Orthodox

Boxing record
- Total fights: 24
- Wins: 18
- Win by KO: 13
- Losses: 6

Hany Atiyo (born 8 November 1983) is an Egyptian former professional boxer who competed from 2009 to 2020 and held the ABU light-heavyweight title from 2011 to 2012.

== Professional boxing record ==
20 fights	15 wins	5 losses
By knockout	11	5
By decision	4	0

No.	Result	Record	Opponent	Type	Round, time	Date	Location	Notes
20	Loss	15-5	(Sweden) Badou Jack	KO	1 (10), 0:45	21 May 2022	Etihad Arena, Abu Dhabi, UAE	
19	Loss	15–4	(Cameroon) Rolly Lambert	TKO	5 (10), 1:39	20 Nov 2020	JW Marriott Marquis Dubai, Dubai, United Arab Emirates	For UBO African cruiserweight title
18	Win	15–3	(Egypt) Medhat El Housny	TKO	6 (8)	26 Feb 2016	Bahja Hall, Qurum, Oman	
17	Loss	14–3	(United States) Roy Jones Jr.	KO	1 (12), 1:15	26 Sep 2014	Basket-Hall, Krasnodar, Russia	For WBU (German Version) cruiserweight title
16	Loss	14–2	(Uganda) Joey Vegas	KO	4 (12), 2:58	14 Jun 2013	Kyadondo Rugby Grounds, Kampala, Uganda	For WBC International light-heavyweight title
15	Win	14–1	(Egypt) Adel Faragaly	TKO	2 (12), 1:22	30 Mar 2013	Cairo University Indoor Hall, Giza, Egypt	Retained Egyptian light-heavyweight title
14	Win	13–1	(Egypt) Ramadan Mahmoud	TKO	5 (8), 1:25	25 Jul 2012	Met Wani Club, Kafr El Sheikh, Egypt	
13	Loss	12–1	(Uganda) Joey Vegas	TKO	11 (12)	6 Apr 2012	Cairo University Indoor Hall, Giza, Egypt	Lost African light-heavyweight title
12	Win	12–0	(Egypt) Mazur Ali	UD	12	27 Jan 2012	Cairo University Indoor Hall, Giza, Egypt	Retained Egyptian light-heavyweight title
11	Win	11–0	(Burkina Faso) Boniface Kabore	RTD	4 (12), 3:00	14 Oct 2011	Le palais des Sports de Ouaga 2000, Ouagadougou, Burkina Faso	Won vacant African light-heavyweight title
10	Win	10–0	(Egypt) Mahmoud Suleiman	PTS	12	24 Aug 2011	Basaten Youth Center Maadi, Cairo, Egypt	Won vacant Egyptian light-heavyweight title
9	Win	9–0	(Egypt) Mahmoud Suleiman	TKO	1 (6), 2:55	12 Jul 2011	Basaten Youth Center Maadi, Cairo, Egypt	
8	Win	8–0	(Egypt) Alaa Mustafa	TKO	5 (6), 2:15	12 Jun 2011	Met Wani Club, Kafr El Sheikh, Egypt	
7	Win	7–0	(Egypt) Mahmoud Suleiman	TKO	6 (6), 2:50	15 Apr 2011	Kafrelsheikh University, Kafr El Sheikh, Egypt	
6	Win	6–0	(Egypt) Adel Faragaly	RTD	4 (12), 3:00	31 Mar 2011	Kafrelsheikh University, Kafr El Sheikh, Egypt	Won vacant UBO African light-heavyweight title
5	Win	5–0	(Egypt) Ramadan Mahmoud	PTS	4	29 Oct 2010	Youth Center, Assiut, Egypt	
4	Win	4–0	(Egypt) Adel Faragaly	UD	6	10 Jun 2010	Sere El Kroba Sports Club, Cairo, Egypt	
3	Win	3–0	(Egypt) Khaled Rusholt	TKO	1 (6), 1:22	28 May 2009	Matoba Youth Center, Giza, Egypt	
2	Win	2–0	(Egypt) Nehad Said	TKO	1 (4)	19 Mar 2009	Egyptian Railway Sporting Club, Cairo, Egypt	
1	Win	1–0	(Egypt) Sayed Ablaziz	TKO	2 (6)	20 Feb 2009	Indoor Hall Olympic Center Maadi, Cairo, Egypt	
