= Hassan N'Dam N'Jikam =

Cameroonian boxer (born 1984)

Personal information
- Nickname: Phenomeno
- Born: 18 February 1984 (age 42) Buea, Cameroon
- Height: 1.81 m (5 ft 11 in)
- Weight: Middleweight; Super-middleweight

Boxing career
- Reach: 1.87 m (74 in)
- Stance: Orthodox

Boxing record
- Total fights: 44
- Wins: 38
- Win by KO: 21
- Losses: 6
Medal record
Men's amateur boxing
Representing Cameroon
All-Africa Games
Silver medal – second place	2003 Abuja	Middleweight
African Championships
Gold medal – first place	2003 Yaoundé	Middleweight

Hassan N'Dam N'Jikam (born 18 February 1984) is a Cameroonian-French professional boxer. He has held WBO middleweight title in 2012 and the WBA (Regular) title in 2017, and has challenged once for a super-middleweight world title in 2019.

== Amateur career ==
N'dam N'Jikam won a silver medal in the middleweight division at the 2003 All-Africa Games, losing to Ramadan Yasser of Egypt in the final. N'jikam represented Cameroon in the middleweight bracket at the 2004 Olympics, defeating Juan Ubaldo of the Dominican Republic and Andy Lee of Ireland on close countback decisions, but losing in the quarter-finals to eventual gold medallist Gaydarbek Gaydarbekov of Russia.

Following the Olympics, and having no means of boxing professionally in his native Cameroon, N'Jikam moved to France due to the shared language.

At the 2016 Olympics, professional boxers were permitted to compete at the Olympics for the first ever time. As one of the few professionals who entered, N'Jikam once again represented Cameroon and qualified for the light-heavyweight bracket, but lost in the first round to Michel Borges of Brazil. This was seen as a surprise to many boxing observers, who predicted that amateurs would not fare well against experienced professionals.

== Professional career ==
N'Jikam made his professional debut on 4 December 2004, scoring a third-round stoppage against Alexis Culit. On 30 October 2010, having fought mainly in his adoptive France, N'Jikam won the vacant WBA interim middleweight title with a close unanimous decision (117-111, 115-114, 115-114) over Avtandil Khurtsidze at the Palais des sports Marcel-Cerdan.

N'Jikam's only defense of his title was made on 2 April 2011 against Giovanni Lorenzo. He won a wide unanimous decision (119-109, 119-110, 116-111) However, major controversy arose during the fight when N'Jikam was knocked out of the ring by a series of punches from Lorenzo in round five. A WBA official then helped N'Jikam back into the ring, which was against the sanctioning body's rules. Lorenzo's team later argued that this should have been grounds for immediate disqualification, as well as disputing the overly wide scorecards.

A purse bid was ordered between N'Jikam and WBA (Regular) champion Gennady Golovkin. The purse bid was scheduled for 2 February 2012. However, days before the purse bid N'Jikam vacated his title rather than face Golovkin.

On 4 May 2012, N'Jikam won the vacant WBO interim middleweight title via unanimous decision against Max Bursak.

He was later promoted to full world champion status on 25 August, after Dmitry Pirog was stripped of the title for choosing to fight Gennady Golovkin instead of mandatory challenger N'Jikam. In his first world title defence on 20 October, as well as his first fight in the United States, N'Jikam suffered six knockdowns en route to a unanimous decision loss (107-115, 107-115, 107-115) to Peter Quillin.

N'Jikam won an IBF title eliminator over Curtis Stevens with a unanimous decision (119-108, 116-111, 116-111). Stevens was knocked down in round 8. A second opportunity to become world champion came on 20 June 2015, against David Lemieux for the vacant IBF middleweight title. N'Jikam again endured multiple knockdowns—four in total—but managed to go the distance to lose on the cards (109-115, 109-115, 110-114).

2016 saw N'Jikam reel off four consecutive victories, with a brief pause in August to compete in the 2016 Olympics. On 17 December, he emphatically re-entered the world title scene by becoming WBA interim middleweight champion for a second time, following a brutal one-punch knockout of Alfonso Blanco in only 22 seconds of the first round.

N'Jikam then won the full (Regular) title with a controversial split decision (116-111, 115-112, 110-117) win over Ryōta Murata on 27 May 2017. N'Jikam was knocked down in round 4 but survived and got the decision. When the result was announced, the crowd at Ariake Colosseum jeered. The two judges who scored the fight for N'Jikam were immediately suspended and WBA president Gilberto Mendoza issued a public apology. A rematch was immediately ordered by the WBA, and scheduled for 22 October.

On 22 October, Murata decisively beat N'Jikam, who threw in the towel after round 7. Murata's body attack wore his opponent down, he was also able to hurt him with a series of combinations. The fight was attended by 8,500 people at the Ryōgoku Kokugikan. This was N'Jikam's first stoppage loss.

On 22 December 2018, N'Jikam managed to overcome a knockdown and beat former title-challenger Martin Murray via a majority-decision win. N'Jikam won on the scorecards, 117-112 and 116-112, while the third judge scored the fight a draw, 114-114.

On the Joshua vs Ruiz undercard, N'Jikam fought Callum Smith for his WBA world title. Smith would end up dropping N'Jikam three times. Despite getting up from the third knockdown too, the referee decided to stop the fight and award Smith the victory.

In his next fight, N'Jikam lost again, this time against WBA #1, WBC #6, IBF #8 and WBC #11 Fedor Chudinov in Russia.

On June 8, 2020, N'Jikam announced that he will transition into MMA, signing with French MMA promotion ARES FC.

== Professional boxing record ==
44 fights	38 wins	6 losses
By knockout	21	3
By decision	17	3

No.	Result	Record	Opponent	Type	Round, time	Date	Location	Notes
44	Loss	38–6	Janibek Alimkhanuly	TKO	8 (10), 2:40	20 Nov 2021	Michelob Ultra Arena, Paradise, Nevada, U.S.	For WBC Continental Americas and WBO Global middleweight titles
43	Win	38–5	Gabor Gorbics	UD	8	2 Jul 2021	Restaurant U Nichjaretu, Calvi, France	
42	Loss	37–5	Fedor Chudinov	UD	12	13 Dec 2019	Manezh, Vladikavkaz, Russia	For inaugural WBA Gold super-middleweight title
41	Loss	37–4	Callum Smith	TKO	3 (12), 2:56	1 Jun 2019	Madison Square Garden, New York City, New York, US	For WBA (Super) and The Ring super-middleweight titles
40	Win	37–3	Martin Murray	MD	12	22 Dec 2018	Manchester Arena, Manchester, England	Won WBC Silver middleweight title
39	Loss	36–3	Ryōta Murata	RTD	7 (12), 3:00	22 Oct 2017	Ryōgoku Kokugikan, Tokyo, Japan	Lost WBA (Regular) middleweight title
38	Win	36–2	Ryōta Murata	SD	12	20 May 2017	Ariake Colosseum, Tokyo, Japan	Won vacant WBA (Regular) middleweight title
37	Win	35–2	Alfonso Blanco	KO	1 (12), 0:22	17 Dec 2016	Stade de l'Est, Saint-Denis, France	Won WBA interim middleweight title
36	Win	34–2	Tomasz Gargula	TKO	7 (8)	30 Jul 2016	La Palestre, Le Cannet, France	
35	Win	33–2	Robert Świerzbinski	TKO	2 (8)	27 May 2016	Cirque d'Hiver, Paris, France	
34	Win	32–2	Patrick Mendy	UD	8	12 Mar 2016	Palais des sports Marcel-Cerdan, Levallois-Perret, France	
33	Loss	31–2	David Lemieux	UD	12	20 Jun 2015	Bell Centre, Montreal, Quebec, Canada	For vacant IBF middleweight title
32	Win	31–1	Curtis Stevens	UD	12	1 Oct 2014	Barker Hangar, Santa Monica, California, US	
31	Win	30–1	Fulgencio Zúñiga	UD	10	16 Apr 2014	Barker Hangar, Santa Monica, California, US	
30	Win	29–1	Ricardo Marcelo Ramallo	TKO	4 (10), 1:32	15 Feb 2014	National Stadium, Dublin, Ireland	
29	Win	28–1	Anthony Fitzgerald	UD	10	14 Dec 2013	Pavelló de la Vall d'Hebron, Barcelona, Spain	
28	Loss	27–1	Peter Quillin	UD	12	20 Oct 2012	Barclays Center, New York City, New York, US	Lost WBO middleweight title
27	Win	27–0	Max Bursak	UD	12	4 May 2012	Palais des sports Marcel-Cerdan, Levallois-Perret, France	Won vacant WBO interim middleweight title
26	Win	26–0	Giovanni Lorenzo	UD	12	2 Apr 2011	La Palestre, Le Cannet, France	Retained WBA interim middleweight title
25	Win	25–0	Avtandil Khurtsidze	UD	12	30 Oct 2010	Palais des Sports, Paris, France	Won vacant WBA interim middleweight title
24	Win	24–0	Omar Gabriel Weis	KO	8 (12)	12 Jun 2010	Jemaa el-Fnaa, Marrakesh, Morocco	Won WBA International middleweight title
23	Win	23–0	Cagri Ermis	TKO	10 (10)	10 Dec 2009	La Palestre, Le Cannet, France	
22	Win	22–0	Sergio Jose Sanders	TKO	6 (10)	10 Dec 2009	Cirque d'Hiver, Paris, France	
21	Win	21–0	Jefferson Gonçalo	UD	10	24 Oct 2009	La Palestre, Le Cannet, France	
20	Win	20–0	Gennady Martirosyan	KO	10 (10)	27 Jun 2009	La Palestre, Le Cannet, France	
19	Win	19–0	Michael Monaghan	TKO	7 (8)	28 May 2009	Cirque d'Hiver, Paris, France	
18	Win	18–0	Samir Santos Barbosa	TKO	4 (10)	5 Mar 2009	Cirque d'Hiver, Paris, France	
17	Win	17–0	Affif Belghecham	UD	10	11 Dec 2008	Cirque d'Hiver, Paris, France	
16	Win	16–0	Woulid Guarras	KO	5 (10)	18 Sep 2008	Cirque d'Hiver, Paris, France	
15	Win	15–0	Mehdi Amar	UD	8	15 May 2008	Cirque d'Hiver, Paris, France	
14	Win	14–0	Eugen Stan	PTS	8	17 Apr 2008	Cirque d'Hiver, Paris, France	
13	Win	13–0	Mounir Sahli	RTD	3 (6)	21 Feb 2008	Cirque d'Hiver, Paris, France	
12	Win	12–0	Kamel Belhachemi	KO	1 (6)	24 Jan 2008	Cirque d'Hiver, Paris, France	
11	Win	11–0	Mike Algoet	UD	6	8 Dec 2007	La Palestre, Le Cannet, France	
10	Win	10–0	Ali Benchabla	TKO	3 (6)	27 Oct 2007	Centre des Congrès des Vieilles-Forges, Les Mazures, France	
9	Win	9–0	Mike Algoet	UD	6	29 Jun 2007	Palais des Sports, Marseille, France	
8	Win	8–0	Malkaz Berkatsashvili	RTD	5 (8)	6 Apr 2007	Gymnase Maurice Baquet, Pantin, France	
7	Win	7–0	Vepkhia Tchilaia	TKO	5 (6)	24 Mar 2007	Palais des Sports, Tours, France	
6	Win	6–0	Zied Sassi	TKO	2 (6)	17 Jun 2006	Palais des Sports, Bondy, France	
5	Win	5–0	Pavel Florin Madalin	KO	2 (8)	24 Feb 2006	Centre sportif, Pétange, Luxembourg	
4	Win	4–0	Adrian Cerneaga	TKO	3 (8)	31 Oct 2005	Centre sportif, Pétange, Luxembourg	
3	Win	3–0	Lubo Hantak	TKO	2 (4)	25 Jun 2005	Gymnase Georges Buffenoir, Rivery, France	
2	Win	2–0	Didier Nkuku Mupeko	PTS	8	4 Feb 2005	Châteauroux, France	
1	Win	1–0	Alexis Culit	TKO	3 (6)	4 Dec 2004	Tours, France	

Sporting positions
Regional boxing titles
Vacant Title last held by Mahir Oral	WBA International middleweight champion 12 June 2010 – 30 October 2010; Won interim world title	Vacant Title next held by Mehdi Bouadla
Preceded by Martin Murray	WBC Silver middleweight champion 22 December 2018 – 1 June 2019; Failed to win Diamond title	Vacant Title next held by Liam Williams
Minor world boxing titles
Vacant Title last held by Gennady Golovkin	WBA middleweight champion Interim title 30 October 2010 – February 2012; Vacated	Vacant Title next held by Martin Murray
Vacant Title last held by Héctor Javier Velazco	WBO middleweight champion Interim title 4 May 2012 – 25 August 2012; Promoted	Vacant Title next held by Avtandil Khurtsidze
Preceded by Alfonso Blanco	WBA middleweight champion Interim title 7 December 2016 – 20 May 2017; Won full title	Vacant Title next held by Chris Eubank Jr.
Vacant Title last held by Daniel Jacobs	WBA middleweight champion Regular title 20 May 2017 – 22 October 2017	Succeeded by Ryōta Murata
World boxing titles
Preceded by Dmitry Pirog stripped	WBO middleweight champion 25 August 2012 – 20 October 2012	Succeeded by Peter Quillin
Awards
Previous: Canelo Álvarez; Canelo Álvarez vs. James Kirkland	ESPN Knockout of the Year; KO1 Alfonso Blanco; 2016	Next: Srisaket Sor Rungvisai; KO4 Román González
