= Suriya Prasathinphimai =

Thai boxer

Suriya Prasathinphimai TBh
Personal information
- Full name: สุริยา ปราสาทหินพิมาย
- Nationality: Thai
- Born: April 2, 1980 (age 46) Nakhon Ratchasima
- Height: 175 cm (5 ft 9 in)
- Weight: 75 kg (165 lb)

Sport
- Sport: Boxing
- Weight class: Middleweight; Light Middleweight
Medal record
Olympic Games
Bronze medal – third place	2004 Athens	Middleweight
Asian Games
Silver medal – second place	2002 Busan	Light Middleweight
Asian Championships
Bronze medal – third place	2007 Ulan Bator	Middleweight

Suriya Prasathinphimai (Thai: สุริยา ปราสาทหินพิมาย; born April 2, 1980) is a Thai boxer who competed in the Middleweight (75 kg) at the 2004 Summer Olympics and won the bronze medal. He qualified for the 2004 Athens Games by ending up in second place in the 2nd AIBA Asian 2004 Olympic Qualifying Tournament in Karachi, Pakistan. In the final he lost to Pakistan's Ahmed Ali Khan.

He is the grandson of Sook Prasathinphimai, a legendary Muay Thai kickboxer in the 50s.

He also has a career in professional Muay Thai, under the name as "Suriya Sor Ploenchit" (สุริยา ส.เพลินจิต).

== Biography ==
=== Professional career ===
On December 2, 2000, he fought against Masato from Japan in the memorial event of Thai King's Birthday. He won by the unanimous decision after 5th round and he also won the world title of IWM(International World Muaythai) at super welterweight.

On May 20, 2001, he fought against Hiroyuki Doi in Japan, and he won by the unanimous decision after 5th round. He knocked down Doi during 4th round with left cross, and Doi was docked one point when he threw Suriya during 5th round because Doi had been in the habit of throwing his opponents as he was a shoot boxer.

=== Winning Bronze medal at Olympic Games ===
On August 28, 2004, he won the bronze medal in middleweight (75 kg) at the 2004 Summer Olympics.

On March 4, 2004, Suriya participated "S-1 World Championship", the tournament of Muay Thai, at the Rajadamnern Stadium in Bangkok, Thailand. He fought against Jean-Charles Skarbowsky from France in the quarter-final, but he was beaten by the unanimous decision after 3rd round.

In 2005 he competed for Thailand at the Boxing World Cup in Moscow, Russia, losing both his matches in the preliminary round. Prasathinphimai is also a professional kickboxer, the winner of World S-1 Kings Cup 2003 Tournament.

Replacing Kaoklai Kaennorsing, he challenged Simon Marcus for his WPMF World Light Heavyweight (-79 kg/175 lb) Championship at Muaythai Superfight in Pattaya, Thailand on June 14, 2013, and losing by unanimous decision.

== Olympic results ==
- Defeated Joseph Lubega (Uganda) 30–21
- Defeated Javid Taghiyev (Azerbaijan) 19-19, won decision
- Defeated Oleg Mashkin (Ukraine) 28–22
- Lost to Gaydarbek Gaydarbekov (Russia) 18–24

== Muay Thai record ==
Professional kickboxing record
72 Wins, 16 Losses, 2 Draws.
Date	Result	Opponent	Event	Location	Method	Round	Time
2013-06-14	Loss	(Canada) Simon Marcus	Muaythai Superfight	Pattaya, Thailand	Decision (unanimous)	5	3:00
For the WPMF World Light Heavyweight (-79kg/175lb) Championship.
2013-03-23	Win	(Suriname) Marco Piqué	Thailand vs. Europe 2013	Neu-Ulm, Germany	Decision (unanimous)	5	3:00
2012-03-16	Win	(United States) Chike Lindsay	San Wan Muaythai Naikhanomtom	Bangkok, Thailand	Decision	5	3:00
2012-02-27	Win	(Belgium) Youssef Boughanem	Europe vs. Thailand	Pattaya, France	Decision	5	3:00
2004-03-04	Loss	(France) Jean-Charles Skarbowsky	S1 World Championships, Quarter-final	Bangkok, Thailand	Decision (Unanimous)	3	3:00
2003-12-05	Win	(France) Farid Villaume	King's Birthday event: S1 World Championships, Final	Sanam Luang, Thailand	Decision	3	3:00
Wins 1st tournament of S1 World Championship.
2003-12-05	Win	(Cambodia) Eh Phoutong	King's Birthday event: S1 World Championships, Semi-final	Sanam Luang, Thailand	Decision	3	3:00
2003-12-05	Win	(Russia) Arslan Magomedov	King's Birthday event: S1 World Championships, Quarter-final	Sanam Luang, Thailand	Decision	3	3:00
2001-12-05	Loss	(Australia) John Wayne Parr	King's Birthday event: Kings Cup Tournament Quarter-final	Sanam Luang, Thailand	Decision (Unanimous)	3	3:00
2001-05-20	Win	(Japan) Hiroyuki Doi	MAJKF "Searching For The Strongest! World Conquest"	Bunkyo, Tokyo, Japan	Decision (Unanimous)	5	3:00
2000-12-02	Win	(Japan) Masato	King's Birthday event	Sanam Luang, Thailand	Decision	5	3:00
Wins the vacant title of IWM World Super welterweight Championship.
2000-10-14	Win	(Thailand) Orono Por Muang Ubon	Lumpinee Stadium	Bangkok, Thailand	Decision	5	3:00
2000-07-13	Win	(Thailand) Orono Tang	Lumpinee Stadium	Bangkok, Thailand	Decision	5	3:00
2000-05-08	Win	(Thailand) Toto Sor.Prantalay	Lumpinee Stadium	Bangkok, Thailand	Decision	5	3:00
2000-04-22	Win	(Thailand) Sak Muangsurin	Lumpinee Stadium	Bangkok, Thailand	Decision	5	3:00
2000-02-11	Win	(Thailand) Toto Sor.Prantalay	Lumpinee Stadium	Bangkok, Thailand	Decision	5	3:00
1997-08-15	Loss	(Thailand) Saifa Sor.Pannut	Lumpinee Stadium	Bangkok, Thailand	Decision	5	3:00
Legend: Win Loss Draw/No contest Notes

== Titles ==
- Amateur
  - 2004 Summer Olympics Boxing Middleweight 3rd place
- Professional
  - IWM World Super welterweight champion
  - S1 World Championship tournament winner
