= Joseph Lubega =

Ugandan boxer

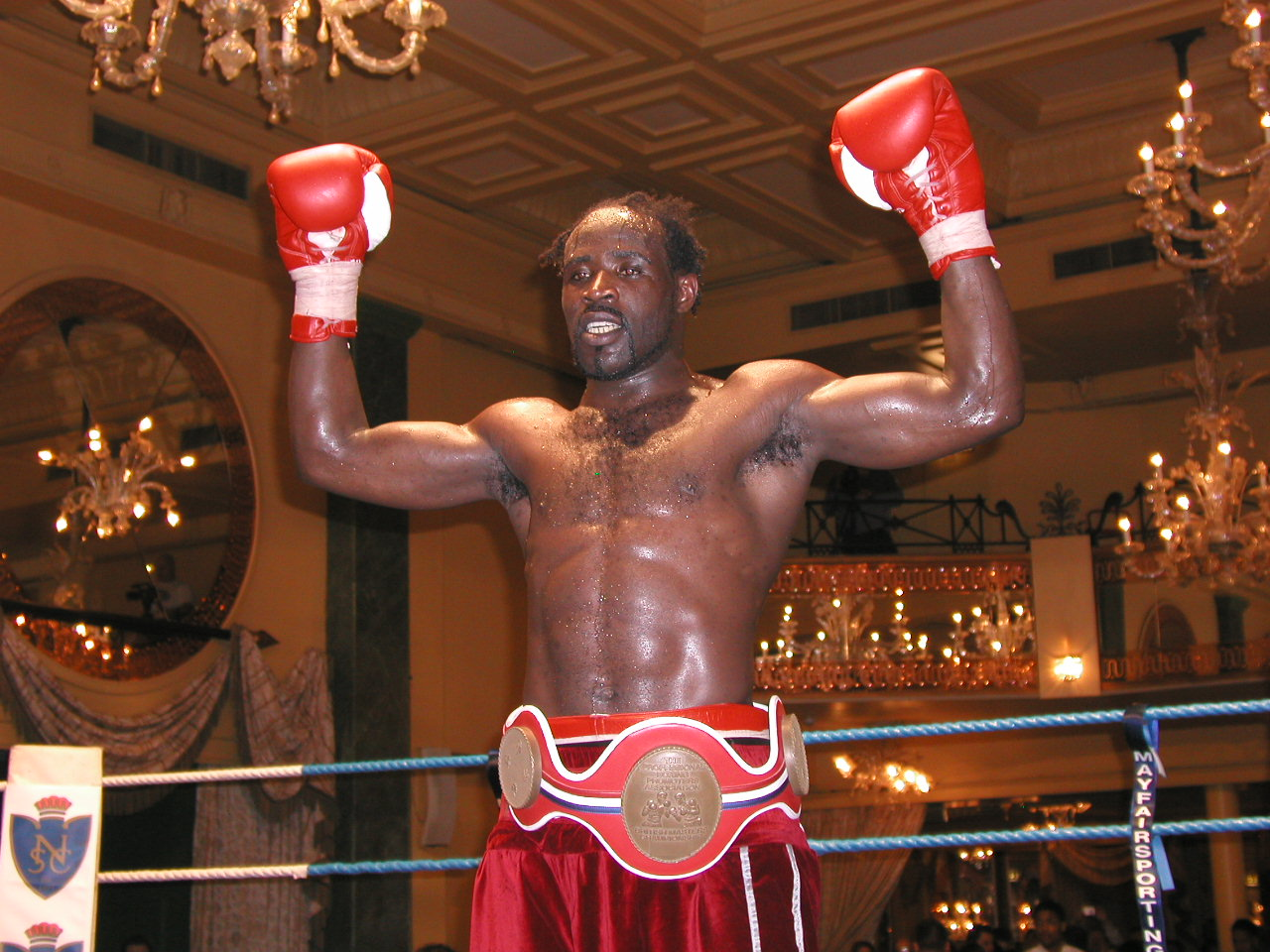

Personal information
- Born: 1 January 1982 (age 44) Namirembe, Kampala, Uganda
Medal record
Men's Boxing
Representing Uganda
Commonwealth Games
Silver medal – second place	2002 Manchester	Light-Heavyweight

Joseph Lubega (born 1 January 1982) is an Ugandan professional boxer. As an amateur, he participated in the 2004 Summer Olympics for his country. There he was stopped in the first round of the middleweight division by Thailand's eventual bronze medal winner Prasathinphimai Suriya.

Two years earlier Lubega won the silver medal at the 2002 Commonwealth Games in the light heavyweight division. He qualified for the Athens Games by winning the silver medal at the 1st AIBA African 2004 Olympic Qualifying Tournament in Casablanca, Morocco. In the final of the event he lost to South African fighter Khostso Motau.

== Professional career ==
Since turning pro Lubega has fought under the alias of "fabulous" Joey Vegas

He was formerly the British Masters Super Middleweight title holder.

In 2008 Vegas challenged Gary 'JJ' Ojuederie for the Southern Area Light Heavyweight title.

In 2009 Vegas held current British and former Commonwealth Light Heavyweight Champ Dean Francis to a draw.

Vegas is currently trained by John Vanner, and is managed by London promoter Michael Helliet.

Joseph Lubega has also won the World Boxing Council International light heavyweight title.

Lubega knocked out Kurt Sinette in the fourth round in Trinidad and Tobago's city of Port of Spain to win the previously vacant title.

Not even the spirited home support for the Caribbean fighter could stop the Ugandan who stretched his record to 13(6kos)- 6-1.

== Professional boxing record ==
42 fights	21 wins	18 losses
By knockout	14	12
By decision	7	6
Draws	3	

No.	Result	Record	Opponent	Type	Round, time	Date	Location	Notes
42	Loss	21–18–3	(Russia) Timur Sakulin	RTD	6 (10) 3:00	16 September 2019	Korston Club, Moscow, Russia	
41	Loss	21–17–3	(China) Qu Peng	KO	1 (10) 1:02	22 December 2018	Wansheng Binjiang Rd Venue, Chongqing, China	For vacant OPBF Silver cruiserweight title
40	Win	21–16–2	(Tanzania) Karama Nyilawila	RTD	5 (12) 3:00	25 August 2018	Lugogo Cricket Ground, Kampala, Uganda	
39	Loss	20–16–3	(Russia) Arsen Aziev	KO	1 (8) 0:30	30 December 2017	(Latvia) Sports Palace Quant, Moscow, Russia	
38	Draw	20–15–3	(United Kingdom) Kenny Egan	MD	6	20 October 2017	Big Zone Club, Nansana, Uganda	
37	Loss	20–15–2	(Latvia) Andrejs Pokumeiko	TKO	3 (8) 2:00	25 May 2017	Studio 69, Riga, Latvia	
36	Win	20–14–2	(Uganda) Charles Kakande	KO	2 (6) 2:54	23 April 2017	New Obligato, Kampala, Uganda	
35	Win	19–14–2	(Uganda) Saidi Chako	TKO	2 (6)	5 April 2017	Bombo Military Barracks Grounds, Bombo, Uganda	
34	Loss	18–14–2	(Russia) Movsur Yusupov	TKO	5 (8) 2:22	10 December 2016	USC Soviet Wings, Moscow, Russia	
33	Win	18–13–2	(Kenya) Ken Oyolo	KO	2 (8) 2:01	17 April 2016	Lugogo Indoor Arena, Kampala, Uganda	
32	Loss	17–13–2	(Russia) Umar Salamov	TKO	2 (10) 0:36	5 March 2016	Colosseum Sport Hall, Grozny, Russia	
31	Loss	17–12–2	(Russia) Alexander Kubich	KO	3 (8) 0:56	5 December 2015	Olympic Reserve Centre of Boxing, Gomel, Belarus	
30	Loss	17–11–2	(Russia) Dmitry Bivol	KO	4 (8) 1:10	22 May 2015	Luzhnik, Moscow, Russia	
29	Draw	17–10–2	(Uganda) Zebra Mando Ssenyange	PTS	8	27 February 2015	Hotel Africana, Kampala, Uganda	
28	Loss	17–10–1	(Russia) Egor Mekhontsev	UD	8	28 November 2014	Luzhnik, Moscow, Russia	
27	Win	17–9–1	(Uganda) Juma Iga	KO	7 (10)	31 August 2014	Club Obligatto, Kampala, Uganda	
26	Loss	16–9–1	(Latvia) Mairis Briedis	TKO	9 (10) 1:09	26 July 2014	Sport Palace, Barnaul, Russia	For vacant WBC Baltic cruiserweight title
25	Loss	16–8–1	(Russia) Dmitry Sukhotsky	UD	12	4 June 2014	Sport Palace, Barnaul, Russia	
24	Loss	16–7–1	(South Africa) Ryno Liebenberg	TKO	1 (12) 2:56	1 March 2014	Emperors Palace, Kempton Park, South Africa	For vacant WBC International light heavyweight title
23	Win	16–6–1	(Egypt) Hany Atiyo	KO	4 (12) 2:58	14 June 2013	Kyadondo Rugby Grounds, Kampala, Uganda	Retained WBC International light heavyweight title
22	Win	15–6–1	(Uganda) Mustapha Noor	KO	3 (10) 0:57	24 February 2013	Little Flowers Arena, Kampala, Uganda	
21	Win	14–6–1	(Trinidad and Tobago) Kirt Sinnette	KO	4 (12) 2:31	2 September 2012	Woodbrook Youth Facility, Port of Spain, Trinidad and Tobago	Won vacant WBC International light heavyweight title
20	Win	13–6–1	(Egypt) Hany Atiyo	TKO	11 (12)	6 April 2012	Cairo University Indoor Hall, Giza, Egypt	Won African light-heavyweight title
19	Win	12–6–1	(Uganda) Mustapha Noor	TKO	4 (10) 1:55	20 October 2011	Charter Hall, Nairobi, Kenya	
18	Loss	11–6–1	(Ukraine) Dmytro Kucher	UD	8	28 August 2010	Independence Square, Kyiv, Ukraine	
17	Loss	11–5–1	(Colombia) Edison Miranda	TKO	5 (10) 2:31	20 March 2009	(United Kingdom) York Hall, London, England	
16	Draw	11–4–1	(United Kingdom) Dean Francis	PTS	8	13 February 2009	(United Kingdom) Oasis Leisure Centre, Swindon, England	
15	Loss	11–4–0	(United Kingdom) JJ Ojuederie	PTS	10	5 October 2008	(United Kingdom) Watford Town Hall, Watford, England	For BBBoC Southern Area light heavyweight title
14	Win	11–3–0	(United Kingdom) JJ Ojuederie	TKO	7 (10) 1:20	1 August 2008	(United Kingdom) Watford Town Hall, Watford, England	
13	Loss	10–3–0	(Serbia) Geard Ajetović	TKO	4 (6) 0:39	14 November 2007	(United Kingdom) York Hall, London, England	
12	Loss	10–2–0	(United Kingdom) Nathan Cleverly	PTS	8	3 November 2007	(United Kingdom) Millennium Stadium, Cardiff, Wales	
11	Loss	10–1–0	(United Kingdom) Danny McIntosh	PTS	6	4 October 2007	(United Kingdom) Café Royal, London, England	
10	Win	10–0–0	(United Kingdom) Neil Tidman	PTS	4	18 April 2007	(United Kingdom) Savoy Hotel, London, England	
9	Win	9–0–0	(Armenia) Varujan Davtyan	TKO	1 (4) 0:47	13 December 2006	(United Kingdom) Savoy Hotel, London, England	
8	Win	8–0–0	(United Kingdom) Michael Monaghan	PTS	10	30 November 2006	(United Kingdom) Café Royal, London, England	
7	Win	7–0–0	(United Kingdom) Simeon Cover	PTS	4	12 July 2006	(United Kingdom) York Hall, London, England	
6	Win	6–0–0	(United Kingdom) Simeon Cover	PTS	10	30 March 2006	(United Kingdom) Café Royal, London, England	
5	Win	5–0–0	(United Kingdom) Conroy McIntosh	TKO	3 (6) 1:23	17 November 2005	(United Kingdom) Café Royal, London, England	
4	Win	4–0–0	(United Kingdom) Gareth Lawrence	PTS	4	26 May 2005	(United Kingdom) Café Royal, London, England	
3	Win	3–0–0	(United Kingdom) Egbui Ikeagwu	PTS	4	26 March 2005	(United Kingdom) Empire Theatre, London, England	
2	Win	2–0–0	(United Kingdom) Egbui Ikeagwu	PTS	4	27 January 2005	(United Kingdom) Café Royal, London, England	
1	Win	1–0–0	(United Kingdom) Cello Renda	TKO	3 (6) 1:58	4 November 2004	(United Kingdom) Café Royal, London, England	
