= Floyd Mayweather Jr. vs. Don Moore =

2022 boxing match

The Showcase in the Skies of Dubai
- Date: May 21, 2022
- Venue: Etihad Arena, Abu Dhabi, United Arab Emirates

Tale of the tape
Boxer	Floyd Mayweather Jr.	Don Moore
Nickname	"Money"	"Dangerous"
Hometown	Grand Rapids, Michigan, U.S.	Gary, Indiana, U.S.
Pre-fight record	50–0 (27 KOs)	18-0-1
Height	5 ft 8 in (173 cm)	5 ft 8 in (173 cm)
Weight	155 lb (70 kg)	154 lb (70 kg)
Style	Orthodox	Orthodox
Recognition	5-division world champion	(none)

Result
- Non-scored Bout

Floyd Mayweather Jr. vs. Don Moore, billed as The Showcase in the Skies of Dubai, was an exhibition boxing match between former five-division world champion Floyd Mayweather Jr. and undefeated boxer Don Moore. It took place on May 21, 2022, at the Etihad Arena in Abu Dhabi, United Arab Emirates. The fight went the distance resulting in being a non-scored bout.

== Background ==
The event was originally scheduled for May 14, 2022, but the event was postponed to May 21, 2022 due to the death of the president of the United Arab Emirates.

Mayweather fought an eight round exhibition bout with former sparring partner Don Moore at a boxing event in Abu Dhabi. The fight was one-sided and Mayweather was in full control of the meeting including dropping Moore with a punch to the body in the eighth round. Moore survived the knockdown and would go the full eight rounds, there was no scoring and it ended without an official verdict.

== Fight card ==
Weight Class		vs.		Method	Round	Time	Notes
Super welterweight	Floyd Mayweather Jr.	vs.	Don Moore	N/A	8	2:00	Exhibition bout, no winner was declared
Catchweight	Anderson Silva	vs.	Bruno Machado	N/A	8	2:00	Exhibition bout, no winner was declared
Cruiserweight	Badou Jack	def.	Hany Atiyo	KO	1 (10)	0:45
Super featherweight	Delfine Persoon	def.	Elhem Mekhaled	UD	10	2:00
