= Gennady Martirosyan =

Armenian boxer

Personal information
- Nationality: Armenian
- Born: Gennady Martirosyan; 23 February 1980 (age 46) Yerevan, Armenia
- Height: 5 ft 7 in (1.70 m)
- Weight: Middleweight

Boxing career
- Stance: Orthodox

Boxing record
- Total fights: 33
- Wins: 26
- Win by KO: 11
- Losses: 7
- Draws: 0
- No contests: 0

Gennady Martirosyan (born 23 February 1980) is a Russian-based Armenian professional boxer. He held the WBO European middleweight title, as well as being a contender for the WBO World middleweight title, losing against Dmitry Pirog.

== Pro ==
Martirosyans debut came on 30 September 2005. In November 2008, 15 fights and 14 wins later, he won his first title match, beating Alexey Chirkov for the Vacant Russian Middleweight title in Saint Petersburg.

In his next fight, on 20 February 2009, Martirosyan knocked out Thailand's Kiatchai Singwancha for the PABA middleweight title. In April he successfully defended this title with a unanimous decision victory over Vedran Akrap.

on 27 June 2009 he faced his biggest challenge yet in fighting the undefeated future interim champion Hassan N'Dam N'Jikam. After going down in the third round but recovering, Martirosyan was knocked out in the tenth round and registered his second defeat.

Back in St Petersburg and a recovery win later, Martirosyan fought for the vacant WBO European middleweight title. He was successful, on 31 October 2009 he stopped Miguel Angel Pena by 5th-round TKO.

Martirosyan spent 2010 defending his title. After knockout wins over Aziz Daari and Vitor Sa, he became WBOs number one ranked middleweight contender.

This of course finally meant the chance to face Dmitry Pirog to become world champion. The battle took place on 25 September 2011 in Krasnodar and would be the second to last fight for both fighters. They fought for ten rounds, with Pirog leading and Martirosyan cut badly. Martirosyan could not come out of his corner for the 11th and the bout was stopped with Pirog victorious.

In 2017, after four years of inactivity, Martirosyan made a comeback, defeating Georgian Nikolozi Tasidis Gviniashvili by decision in Germany.

== Professional boxing record ==
33 fights	26 wins	7 losses
By knockout	11	5
By decision	15	2

No.	Result	Record	Opponent	Type	Round, time	Date	Location	Notes
33	Loss	26–7	Orkhan Gadzhiev	TKO	3 (10)	20 Sep 2022	USC Soviet Wings, Moscow, Russia	
32	Loss	26–6	Edgard Moskvichev	UD	10	11 Jun 2021	Vegas City Hall, Krasnogorsk, Russia	For vacant WBA Asia middleweight title
31	Loss	26–5	Ibrahim Guemes	TKO	6 (12), 0:46	16 Nov 2019	Sartory Säle, Cologne, Germany	For vacant IBF Mediterranean middleweight title
30	Loss	26–4	Fouad El Massoudi	SD	10	27 Oct 2018	Arena Armeec, Sofia, Bulgaria	
29	Win	26–3	Artem Karasev	UD	6	19 Aug 2018	Korston Club, Moscow, Russia	
28	Win	25–3	Artem Karpets	PTS	6	11 Nov 2017	Werner-Seelenbinder-Sportpark, Berlin, Germany	
27	Win	24–3	Nikolozi Gviniashvili	UD	6	30 Jun 2017	Werner-Seelenbinder-Sportpark, Berlin, Germany	
26	Win,	23–3	Omar Marabayev	UD	6	2 Nov 2013	Giant Hall Casino Conti, Saint Petersburg, Russia	
25	Loss	22–3	Dmitry Pirog	RTD	10 (12), 3:00	25 Sep 2011	Olimp, Krasnodar, Russia	For WBO middleweight title
24	Win	22–2	Antonio Valentín Ochoa	TKO	6 (10), 2:42	16 Apr 2011	Typhoon Club, Saint Petersburg, Russia	
23	Win	21–2	Vítor Sá	TKO	3 (12), 2:42	29 Oct 2010	Yubileyny Sports Palace, Saint Petersburg, Russia	Retained WBO European middleweight title
22	Win	20–2	Aziz Daari	RTD	10 (12), 3:00	27 Feb 2010	Atmosphere Night Club, Saint Petersburg, Russia	Retained WBO European middleweight title
21	Win	19–2	Miguel Ángel Peña	TKO	5 (12), 2:33	31 Oct 2009	Gladiator Fight Club, Saint Petersburg, Rusisa	Won inaugural WBO European middleweight title
20	Win	18–2	Leonti Vorontsuk	TKO	1 (6), 2:20	18 Sep 2009	Gladiator Fight Club, Saint Petersburg, Russia	
19	Loss	17–2	Hassan N'Dam N'Jikam	KO	10 (10)	27 Jun 2009	La Palestre, Le Cannet, France	
18	Win	17–1	Vedran Akrap	UD	10	24 Apr 2009	Atmosphere Night Club, Saint Petersburg, Russia	Retained WBA-PABA middleweight title
17	Win	16–1	Kiatchai Singwancha	KO	9 (11), 1:18	20 Feb 2009	Giant Hall Casino Conti, Saint Petersburg, Russia	Won vacant WBA-PABA middleweight title
16	Win	15–1	Alexey Chirkov	RTD	3 (10), 3:00	27 Nov 2008	Yubileyny Sports Palace, Saint Petersburg, Russia	Won vacant Russian middleweight title
15	Win	14–1	Attila Kovács	UD	10	4 Oct 2008	PetersburgRegionGaz, Vyborg, Russia	
14	Win	13–1	Steven Conway	UD	8	5 Jul 2008	León, Province of León, Spain	
13	Win	12–1	Emanuel González	MD	10	12 Apr 2008	Giant Hall Casino Conti, Saint Petersburg, Russia	
12	Win	11–1	Kai Kauramaki	TKO	1 (8), 2:38	1 Mar 2008	Giant Hall Casino Conti, Saint Petersburg, Russia	
11	Win	10–1	Jairo Álvarez	UD	8	4 Oct 2007	Galdiator Fight Club, Saint Petersburg, Russia	
10	Win	9–1	Deniss Aleksejevs	RTD	3 (8), 3:00	21 Jun 2007	Gladiator Fight Club, Saint Petersburg, Russia	
9	Win	8–1	Tagir Rzaev	UD	8	3 May 2007	Gladiator Fight Club, Saint Petersburg, Russia	
8	Win	7–1	Dmitri Protkunas	UD	6	16 Mar 2007	Kuopio Hall, Kuopio, Finland	
7	Win	6–1	Ruslan Semenov	UD	8	10 Feb 2007	Giant Hall Casino Conti, Saint Petersburg, Russia	
6	Win	5–1	Andrei Staliarou	KO	2 (6)	18 Nov 2006	Petrodvorets, Saint Petersburg Governorate, Russia	
5	Win	4–1	Andrey Tylilyuk	UD	6	12 Oct 2006	Giant Hall Casino Conti, Saint Petersburg, Russia	
4	Win	3–1	Ruslan Akhmedzanov	UD	4	18 May 2006	Giant Hall Casino Conti, Saint Petersburg, Russia	
3	Win	2–1	Islam Yasupov	UD	4	22 Mar 2006	Giant Hall Casino Conti, Saint Petersburg, Russia	
2	Loss	1–1	Ruslan Yakupov	TKO	4 (6)	24 Dec 2005	SKK Energetik, Sosnovy Bor, Russia	
1	Win	1–0	Vladimir Zavgorodniy	TKO	2 (4)	30 Sep 2005	Ice Palace, Saint Petersburg, Russia	
