= Badou Jack =

Swedish boxer (born 1983)

Badou Johannes Gabriel Jack
Personal information
- Nickname: The Ripper
- Born: 31 October 1983 (age 42) Stockholm, Sweden
- Height: 6 ft 1 in (185 cm)
- Weight: Super-middleweight; Light-heavyweight; Cruiserweight

Boxing career
- Reach: 73 in (185 cm)

Boxing record
- Total fights: 35
- Wins: 29
- Win by KO: 17
- Losses: 4
- Draws: 3

Badou Jack (born 31 October 1983) is a Swedish professional boxer. He has held world titles in three weight classes, including the World Boxing Council (WBC) super-middleweight title from 2015 to 2017, the World Boxing Association (WBA) light-heavyweight title in 2017, and the WBC cruiserweight title twice between 2023 and 2025. As an amateur, he represented Gambia at the 2008 Olympics, reaching the first round of the middleweight bracket.

== Early life ==
Jack was raised in Stockholm, where he was influenced by both Swedish culture and his Gambian heritage. He developed an interest in various athletic activities during his childhood, participating in several sports. However, boxing became his main focus.

== Amateur career ==
Jack began his amateur boxing career in 2001 at the age of 18. He held a record of 150 wins and 25 losses. He won Sweden's national championship five years in a row, 2004–2008, 4 times at middleweight and once at light heavyweight. Jack boxed for Djurgårdens IF. In 2007, Jack was named the boxer of the year by the Swedish Boxing Federation. In his last national championship in 2008 he defeated fellow rising star Erik Skoglund in the finals. He represented Sweden at light-heavyweight before changing to Gambia, where he qualified for the 2008 Games.

At the 2nd AIBA African 2008 Olympic Qualifying Tournament he breezed through the competition to win; the final was a shutout win over DR Congo's Herry Saliku Biembe. Jack qualified for the 2008 Olympics for Gambia in the middleweight division, and was the nation's flag bearer at the Opening Ceremonies. He lost in the first round to India's Vijender Singh.

== Professional career ==
=== Super middleweight ===
==== Early career ====
Jack started his professional career in his native Sweden where he won his debut fight by unanimous decision on 6 June 2009. His next four fights were contested in Sweden and Finland, with Jack winning each by KO/TKO, two in the first round.

==== Fighting in the United States ====
In 2009, Jack met former heavyweight champion Shannon Briggs at a Swedish boxing event, held in honor of the Swedish boxing legend Ingemar Johansson, where Jack was fighting and Briggs was brought in as a guest. Jack would later move to the United States in 2010 to train with Briggs and eventually sign with Lou DiBella and the Warrior Boxing Promotions in 2011, bringing his 5–0 record over to the states.

In 2011 and 2012 Jack would fight and win 6 times. 4 by TKO and 2 by decision. Including defeating Adam Collins by TKO on 16 December 2011 and a unanimous decision over 6 rounds (60–54, 59–55 and 58–56) over Grover Young on 7 March 2012.

The biggest win came against fellow undefeated, 17–0, prospect Alexander Brand on 11 May 2012 by eight-round split decision 77–75, 77–75, and 75–77.

==== Mayweather Promotions ====
Following his success extending his record to 11–0, Jack was spotted by Floyd Mayweather in a sparring session in opposite Andre Dirrell. Mayweather was impressed and quickly signed Jack to Mayweather Promotions and to his team. On 2 February 2013 he defeated Jonel Tapia by knockout in the first round. Three weeks later he fought Don Mouton 23 February 2013 and won by unanimous decision (78–74 on all scorecards). On 4 May 2013 Jack took on Michael Gbenga and won by TKO from a body shot in round 3. Jack fought Farah Ennis on 19 July 2013. Jack won the fight by unanimous decision 100–90, 98–92, and 98–92.

In his first title fight, Jack challenged Marco Antonio Periban for the NABF super middleweight championship on 12 September 2013. After 10 rounds the fight was scored as a majority draw. In his next fight he took on Rogelio Medina on 6 December 2013. He won the fight by TKO after scoring 3 knockdowns in round 6.

On 28 February 2014 Jack fought Derek Edwards and lost for the first time after being stopped by TKO in the first round. Edwards knocked down Jack twice in first round after catching him with an overhand right counter. Prior to the loss, Jack had been in line for an elimination bout against James DeGale. The upset result was also a candidate for Upset of the Year in 2014.

Jack got back into the win column on 30 August 2014 when he fought Jason Escalera at the Palms Casino and Resort, Pearl Theater in Las Vegas, Nevada, and won by unanimous decision 100–90, 100–90, and 99–91.

Jack's next fight was due to take place on 12 December 2014 against Mexican boxer Francisco Sierra at the Alamodome in San Antonio, Texas on the undercard of Erislandy Lara vs. Ishe Smith. Sierra gained 20 pounds between the weigh in and the opening bell, coming into the ring at 192 pounds. Jack dominated the fight from the start. The end came in round 6. Jack landed some combinations, which went unanswered by Sierra. The referee stopped the fight at 1:58 giving Jack the TKO win.

==== Jack vs. Dirrell ====
On 17 February 2015 it was announced that Jack would be challenging undefeated Anthony Dirrell (27–0–1, 22 KOs) for his WBC super middleweight championship. As a voluntary defence, Jack was given little chance, most thinking that he would be knocked out. Prior to the fight, Dirrell spoke to PBC about Jack being his next opponent, "[Jack is] nothing spectacular. He's just a fighter. I'm going to go in there and stick to my game plan, not rush anything and take it however it comes." The fight took place on 24 April at the UIC Pavilion in Chicago, Illinois. Jack upset the boxing world by defeating Dirrell via majority decision 116–112, 115–113, and 114–114, taking more and more control of the fight as it went on and exposing the champions inability to fight on the inside. After the fight, Jack said, "I was in great shape and I believed in myself. All that talk don't matter. I knew they couldn't rob me. I thought I clearly won. It was a tough start to my career, but now, I'm a world champ."

==== Jack vs. Groves ====
On 17 June 2015, it was announced that Jack would make his first defence against mandatory challenger George Groves (21–2, 16 KOs) on 22 August in Las Vegas. A venue hadn't been confirmed. This fight was Groves' third world title challenge, having lost back to back challenges against then world champion Carl Froch in 2013 and 2014 respectively. On 21 July, the fight was pushed back to instead take place on the undercard of Floyd Mayweather Jr. vs. Andre Berto on 12 September at the MGM Grand Garden Arena. There was no injuries as Showtime gave no reason as to why the fight was postponed. Jack was once again the underdog. Jack upset the odds again, defeating Groves. He dropped Groves in the first round and remained in control of the fight as it went on, making effective use of his body punches especially. He was victorious via split decision 115–112, 116–111, and 113–114. Groves felt as though he did enough to win and said, "Losing a world title fight is the worst feeling in the world." In October 2016, Jack admitted that Groves was the toughest opponent he had faced in his career so far.

==== Jack vs. Bute ====
Jack was set to defend his title next against Julio Cesar Chavez Jr. on 30 April 2016. However, Chavez Jr. would later withdraw from the bout due to an injury. He was replaced by Lucian Bute. Where the winner would go on to fight the winner of DeGale & Medina in the fall in a super middleweight unification bout. The fight was declared a majority draw 117–111, 114–114, and 114–114 and, as such, Jack retained the title. The draw was controversial since it appeared as Jack had done enough to be handed the victory by all of the judges. Most of the media scorecards also had Jack as the winner by 3-4 rounds. However, on 26 May 2016 it was revealed that Bute had tested positive for a banned substance in the post-fight drug test. The substance found in Bute's test was ostarine (also called enobosarm), which is a performance-enhancing drug, not an anabolic steroid but is still said to increase stamina and recovery ability and produce similar results that steroids would. It has been on the World Anti-Doping Agency banned list since 2008. On 24 April 2017, the DC commission changed the outcome of the fight to a DQ win in favor of Jack.

==== Jack vs. DeGale ====
Showtime Boxing confirmed that a unification fight between Jack and IBF world champion James DeGale (23–1, 14 KOs) was set for 14 January 2017. The fight was supposed to be announced for the fall of 2016, however it had taken a little longer for the negotiations to complete. The vacant Ring magazine title would also be at stake as well as the WBC and IBF titles. On 15 November, it was officially confirmed that the fight will take place at the Barclays Center in Brooklyn, New York. The first time both fighters would be fighting at the arena.

Jack retained his title after his fight was declared a majority draw when judge Glenn Feldman scored it 114–112 for DeGale and judges Julie Lederman and Steve Weisfeld both scored it 113–113 draw. Both fighters were knocked down during the bout, Jack hitting the canvas in the first round while DeGale was dropped in the twelfth. Post-fight Jack's promoter Floyd Mayweather Jr, complained about the result saying his fighter had done enough to win and calling the decision "bad for boxing." When DeGale said he wanted a rematch possibly in London, Jack stated he would do it light heavyweight, with Mayweather also saying Jack had become too big for super-middleweight. Jack's purse for the fight was $700,000, while DeGale made $750,000. According to CompuBox, Jack landed 231 of 745 punches thrown, a connect rate of 31%, more than DeGale, who landed 172 of 617, connect rate of 28%.

=== Light heavyweight ===
On 16 January 2017, the WBC ordered negotiations to begin for Jack to make a mandatory defence against British boxer Callum Smith (22–0, 17 KOs). The deadline was set for 17 February, or it would go to purse bid. On 18 January, Jack officially vacated his WBC belt in order to move up to light heavyweight.

==== Jack vs. Cleverly ====
On 19 June, Jack revealed that his team were working towards a deal for him to fight WBA (Regular) champion Nathan Cleverly. He expected when the fight gets announced, it would be on the undercard of Floyd Mayweather Jr. vs. Conor McGregor in Las Vegas on 26 August 2017. Jack's light heavyweight goal was to challenge WBC champion Adonis Stevenson, after Cleverly. On 19 July, according to sources, a deal was being close to being agreed from sides. On 27 July, the WBA ordered Cleverly to fight undefeated WBA interim champion Dmitry Bivol (11–0, 9 KOs), which would eventually establish a mandatory challenger for WBA (Super) champion Andre Ward.

On 9 August, however, Eddie Hearn confirmed that terms had been agreed for a fight between Jack and Cleverly. It was also reported that whether the WBA (Regular) title would be at stake at this point was uncertain, as mandatory challenger Bivol was yet to agree a step aside fee. On 12 August, the WBA's Championships Committee granted special permission for the fight to be contested for their light heavyweight title. They also made it clear that the winner would need to negotiate a deal to fight Bivol by 11 September 2017. Jack won the WBA title on his light heavyweight debut via stoppage victory in round five. Cleverly had some success in round two, throwing and landing continuously without hurting Jack. In round four, Jack piled the pressure on Cleverly, who left himself open and ended up with a bloodied nose. The end came with Cleverly against the ropes and Jack pounding him with combinations. Referee stepped in and called an end to the fight at 2 minutes and 47 seconds of round five. At the time of stoppage, Jack had landed 172 punches of 442 thrown (39%), while Cleverly, who threw 409, only landed 82 punches (20%). In the post-fight, Jack said, "I wanted to box him and feel him out while establishing my jab. Then the plan was to break him down from there. The plan was to finish him." Cleverly stated that he suffered a broken nose in the third round. Jack also told Jim Gray of Showtime, "You can't leave it in the hands of the judges. You have to go for the kill", referring to his previous fight decisions. Jack received a base purse of $750,000 and Cleverly earned $100,000. The next day, Cleverly announced his retirement from boxing at the age of 30.

Jack was set to enter a purse bid with Bivol per the WBA agreement on 25 September, but this was cancelled when Jack instead vacated the title on 23 September.

==== Jack vs. Stevenson ====
After Jack defeated Cleverly, he began to call out WBC and lineal titleholder Adonis Stevenson, knowing that Stevenson had a mandatory challenger. Stevenson shrugged it off, claiming he was ready for anyone, "It was a good performance. He beat Cleverly now. So now he called me out and I'm ready. I'm ready to fight and I'm ready to unify the title." On 8 September 2017 promoter Yvon Michel disclosed that there was serious ongoing negotiations between Stevenson and mandatory challenger Eleider Álvarez (23-0, 11 KOs) to fight before the end on 2017. He revealed the fight would take place in Quebec. In September, Michel said that he had a difficult time finalizing a date and venue for the fight, which meant the fight could get pushed to the end of January 2018. He also responded to claims of Jack wanting to fight Stevenson, saying it would only be possible if it were a unification. Michel confirmed the fight would take place on Showtime in January 2018. Michel spoke to Showtime about not going head to head locally with David Lemieux's next fight, which would take place on 16 December on HBO. On 8 November, there was rumours stating that Stevenson would once again pay Álvarez a step-aside fee, in order to fight Jack. Álvarez spoke to TVA Sports saying, "I do not think I'm going to fight Stevenson. I do expect to receive that (step-aside offer), and then I will analyze it with my team." On 1 December, it was reported that GYM had offered Álvarez a step-aside deal which would give him 'a multi-fight agreement with six-figure guarantee per fight', with Stevenson being part of deal as well. On 6 December, the WBC announced that they would investigate into Stevenson's title reign and lack of mandatories. A week later, the WBC stated they would allow Stevenson to avoid Álvarez once again in order to fight Jack. The WBC went on to state they would order Álvarez to fight Ukrainian boxer Oleksandr Gvozdyk (14–0, 12 KOs) for the interim title. Álvarez withdrew from the fight before the purse bid was scheduled on 12 January 2018. On 24 January 2018 Showtime confirmed the fight would take place on 19 May in Canada. The Bell Centre in Montreal was confirmed as the venue.

On 11 April, news broke out from Álvarez's manager, Stephane Lepine that a deal was yet to be reached with Álvarez to be properly compensated. Yvon Michel admitted he was working on a deal to keep Álvarez happy and this was the same reason as to why tickets had not yet gone on sale for the Stevenson-Jack fight, which was a month away. On 18 April, it was announced that a deal had been reached for Álvarez to challenge Sergey Kovalev (32–2–1, 28 KOs) for the WBO light heavyweight title on HBO. Kovalev was originally scheduled to fight contender Marcus Browne in the summer of 2018, however due to having been arrested for domestic violence, Kovalev's promoter, Kathy Duva of Main Events got in contact with Álvarez's manager Lepine about a potential fight. Due to Álvarez fighting Kovalev, this meant the announcement of Stevenson vs. Jack would be imminent. On 23 April, the card was moved from Montreal and instead scheduled to take place at the Air Canada Centre in Toronto, Ontario, Canada. A day later, the official press conference was held to announce the fight.

Stevenson and Jack fought to a majority draw in a competitive bout. One judge scored the fight 115–113 in favor of Jack, whilst the remaining two judges overruled the decision, scoring the fight 114–114. Stevenson outpointed Jack in the early rounds being more active, however from round five, it was Jack who was the busier and accurate of the two. From rounds seven through ten, Jack out landed Stevenson 114–40 in total shots landed. It was in round ten where Jack was hurt from multiple body shots from Stevenson's right hand. Stevenson carried the momentum into round eleven but it was Jack who finished the fight stronger. In round seven, Stevenson complained to referee Ian John Lewis about low blows and in round eight, Jack was warned. Jack later explained Stevenson's cup was low, hence why the shots looked like low blows. With the draw, Stevenson retained his WBC and lineal titles for the ninth time.

During the post fight interviews, Stevenson told Steve Gray, "I won the fight because I hurt him in the body. I hurt him in the body and he got slowed down. I kept the pressure on him. He was moving and moving – slick, slick – but I touched him more of the time and I think I won this fight." Speaking on the third draw in his last four fights (before Bute was DQ'd for failed drug test), Jack stated, "I have no idea. It could be they're jealous of Floyd (Mayweather). I'm one of Floyd's top fighters. Maybe they don't like Floyd. Maybe they're trying to – you know, I don't know. To be honest, I don't know. I’ve gotta thank God for everything. ... I can't do anything about it. I thought I definitely won the fight, definitely won the fight. Nobody's complaining and no judge had him winning." According to CompuBox Stats, Stevenson landed 165 of 622 punches thrown (27%), 87 of which were power shots landed to the body and Jack landed 209 of his 549 thrown (38%) The fight averaged 535,000 viewers and peaked at 611,000 viewers on Showtime. The fight aired on pay-per-view in Canada.

==== Jack vs. Browne ====
In November 2018, speaking to Swedish news agency TT, Jack revealed he would not fight again in the year and would likely return in early January 2019. Light heavyweight upcomer Marcus Browne (22–0, 16 KOs) called out Jack to fight him in what was an 'open division' as both traded words on Instagram. Both boxers claimed they were available to take the fight next, A few days later, Jack stated he was open to fighting WBA champion Dmitry Bivol, after Bivol's successful defence against veteran boxer Jean Pascal. Jack also went on to explain that he did not turn down a fight against Bivol in 2018. According to RingTV.com on 26 November, a deal was close to being reached for Jack and Browne to fight on the Manny Pacquiao vs. Adrien Broner Showtime PPV undercard on 19 January 2019. On 17 December, the fight was announced to take place on the PPV undercard, taking place at the MGM Grand Garden Arena in Paradise, Nevada. Although both were ranked highly with the WBC, the fight would be contested for the WBA interim light heavyweight title. Browne was ranked #1 by the WBA and WBC and #7 by the WBO, while Jack was ranked #2 by the WBA, WBC and the WBO. Browne was 'honored and a privileged' to be able to fight on a big PPV undercard. He was also excited with the opportunity of fighting his first big name on his way to becoming a household name.

Browne used his youth, speed and power advantage to pound out a one-sided twelve round unanimous decision win over Jack, who suffered a horrendous cut on his forehead in round seven. The judges’ scores were 117–110, 116–111 and 119–108 in Browne's favor. Both boxers started fight off slow, but it was Browne who managed to do more to win the early rounds. In round seven, following an accidental clash of heads, a vertical cut appeared on Jack's forehead, with blood streaming down. The head clash seemed to be initiated by Jack, who according to Browne, was coming forward with his head all fight. Jack had his best round in round twelve, as he attacked Browne hard in landing some nice shots. At this point, Jack needed a knockout, but was not able to hurt Browne. He lacked the power, and had taken so much punishment. After the fight, Browne said, "He was a real tough competitor. He thought he would take me deep in the rounds and drown me but I came in shape. I used my athletic ability. I did what I do best -- box the crap out of people. I was too slick, too sharp." Jack did not stay long after the bout and was taken to a hospital. After being stitched up, Jack congratulated Browne, "I would like to thank all of the fans for your support! The cut was a nasty one, but I'm fine now, Alhamdulillah. Congrats to Marcus Browne who fought a great fight. Regardless of the cut he was the better man tonight. I am a warrior and will never quit. I dedicated this fight to the refugee children across the world who fight a much tougher fight than I did tonight. I will continue to fight for them until the end." Browne landed 145 of 515 punches thrown (28%) and Jack landed 66 of his 303 thrown (22%). Jack received $500,000 and Browne was guaranteed a $250,000 purse.

==== Jack vs. Pascal ====
Next Jack would be booked for another world title fight, set for 28 December 2019 against the champion Jean Pascal (34–6–1, 20 KO's) for the WBA (Regular) light-heavyweight title and WBC Silver light heavyweight titles. The fight took place at State Farm Arena in Atlanta on the undercard of Gervonta Davis vs. Yuriorkis Gamboa. Pascal was ranked #3 by the WBC at light heavyweight. The card was televised on Showtime. The card marked the first time since 1998, in which a world title was contested in Atlanta. Pascal was ready to put on another performance in the US, but admitted Jack was a tough opponent. Both weighed 174½ pounds for the contest.

It was a close hard fought fight, where Pascal had the better start, winning the majority of the opening rounds and scoring a knockdown at the end of a right hook in round 4. However, Jack found his way back into the fight, using his jab and body punches to render damage to his opponent and win rounds. In the 12th and final round Jack returned the knockdown favor and dropped Pascal to the canvas with a overhand right and a flurry of right hooks. Even despite his success in the middle- and later rounds, and the big knockdown in the 12th, Jack once again found himself on the losing end of a close fight, losing by a somewhat controversial split decision (114–112, 112–114, 112–114). According to CompuBox Fight Stats, Pascal landed 155 of 556 punches thrown (28%) while Jack had a bigger output, landing 244 of 632 punches thrown (39%). Due to the controversial result, talks of an immediate rematch started right away, with both parties interested in making it happen during 2020.

Pascal acknowledged the fight was close, but adamant he did enough to win and claimed there was no robbery. As per the split decision outcome, Jack felt he did enough to win and asked Pascal if he would give him a rematch, to which Pascal replied, "Anytime." The event was attended by 14,129 fans, a near sell-out.

Mayweather Promotions' CEO Leonard Ellerbe spoke to reporters after the fight. He said. “We just can't seem to catch a break. I feel bad, each and every fight he comes out there, he gives it his all. He's come up short a few times.” The comment was in regards to many close world title decisions not going in Jack's favor.

==== Jack vs. McKernan ====
While a rematch between Jack and Pascal had been discussed for a while, instead Jack would be booked to fight Blake McKernan (13–0, 6 KO's) on 28 November 2020 at the Mike Tyson vs. Roy Jones Jr. card. With McKernan's regular weight being at cruiserweight, it was first discussed that he would drop down and face Jack at light heavyweight. However, later it was revealed that Jack instead would move up to fight McKernan at cruiserweight. Jack also stated that he would like make a permanent move to cruiserweight later in the future. But he was also vocal about still wanting a second fight against Pascal, and many felt that the McKernan fight would be a fight for Jack to just stay active while waiting on the rematch. Jack declared that he would be donating all of his fight proceedings to charity, through the Badou Jack Foundation. Jack had a dominant performance, winning the 8-round bout by a lopsided unanimous decision (80–72 on all scorecards). As of statistics from CompuBox, Jack landed 203 of 520 punches thrown (39%) while McKernan only landed 92 of 471 punches thrown (20%).

==== Cancelled Jean Pascal rematch ====
A rematch between Jack and Jean Pascal was signed and confirmed on February 13, 2020 to take place on FOX or Showtime, likely in May 2020. The rematch was put on hold due to the COVID-19 pandemic. Ellerbe stated Jack's first priority was to take the rematch with Pascal, but Pascal wanted to wait until fans are allowed to attend. Jack took stay busy fight on Triller Pay-Per-View, on the undercard of Mike Tyson vs. Roy Jones Jr. exhibition in November 2020. Jack won a lop-sided 8-round decision against Blake McKernan.

In April 2021, the rematch against announced to take place on the undercard of Floyd Mayweather Jr. vs. Logan Paul on 6 June 2021 on Showtime PPV at the Hard Rock Stadium in Miami Gardens, Florida. The fight was cancelled when it emerged on 28 May that Pascal had failed random Voluntary Anti-Doping Association-administered tests and had tested positive for three different banned PEDs: drostanolone, drostanolone metabolite and epitrenbolone. Jack posted on his twitter the fight was off, making a statement that his team believed Pascal was 'dirty' for the first bout. Jack's place on the card remained, now looking for a new opponent. Pascal responded to the news, saying that he was "shocked and embarrassed". He also stated this was an isolated incident.

==== Jack vs. Colina ====
Undefeated Venezuelan Dervin Colina (15-0, 13 KOs) stepped in to fight Jack. On 3 June, reports surfaced that Pascal had failed yet another drugs test, testing positive for a fourth banned substance, erythropoietin, also known as EPO. Jack said to reporters on the fourth failed test, “It just proves he's a piece of sh-t, and he should be banned for life, in my opinion.” Jack was hoping for the first fight to be changed to a 'no-contest'.

The gulf in class was apparent very quickly, with Colina being deducted two points in the second and third round for excessive clinching. Jack dropped his opponent three times in the fourth round, forcing the referee to halt the contest, with Jack being declared the winner by fourth-round technical knockout.

=== Cruiserweight ===
==== Jack vs. Crossed ====
Jack fought Samuel Crossed (11–1–1, 7 KO's) in a stay-busy fight on 26 November 2021, at the Motospace Dubai Investment Park in Dubai. The ten-round bout was broadcast by ESPN on the American continents, and could be seen on IFL TV worldwide. Jack entered the fight as an overwhelming -4000 favorite, while most odds-makers had Crossed as a +1100 underdog. Jack won the second cruiserweight fight of his career by a second-round knockout. Referee called off the fight after Crossed was knocked down for the third time in the round.

==== Jack vs. Atiyo, Rivera ====
Jack was scheduled to face Hany Atiyo on 14 May 2022, on the Mayweather Jr. vs. Moore card. However, due to the death of the president of the United Arab Emirates, the event was postponed to 21 May. Jack entered as the clear favorite. From the opening bell, Jack established dominance. He connected with a leaping left hook early in the opening minute, sending Atiyo to the canvas and securing the knockout victory in the first round. The fight lasted less than a minute. Jack landed 6 punches, (40% of total thrown) and Atiyo landed just 1 punch (8%).

On 21 July 2022, it was announced that Jack would next fight unbeaten Richard Rivera on the undercard of Oleksandr Usyk vs Anthony Joshua II on 20 August. Jack looked forward to his debut in Saudi Arabia and the possibilities for upcoming events in the area. Rivera was enthusiastic about the fight and saw it as a chance to demonstrate his skills and possibly succeed the veteran Jack. Jack weighed in at 199 pound. Rivera, who was moving up in weight came in at a career high 194.9 pounds. Jack won a split decision against Rivera that sparked controversy. The eighth round's events likely influenced the outcome in Jack's favor. Rivera dominated the first half of the fight, landing significant uppercuts and maintaining a high pace, which kept Jack on the defensive. Jack faced challenges with Rivera's unpredictable style, landing some body shots but struggling to take control. Due to a timekeeper error, the eighth round was extended to four minutes, almost a minute longer than allowed. In this extra time, Jack managed to corner Rivera and deliver powerful punches. Although Rivera endured the additional time, the contentious round negatively impacted his chances. In the final rounds, Jack intensified his efforts, landing effective punches that briefly staggered Rivera. Two judges scored the bout 96–94 in favor of Jack, while one judge scored it 96-94 for Rivera. DAZN commentator Chris Mannix noted that the extra minute might have cost Rivera the fight. Rivera's promoter, Joe DeGuardia, criticized the extended eighth round as "absolutely inexcusable" and suggested the possibility of a rematch.

==== Jack vs. Makabu ====
On 27 January 2023, it was announced that Jack would challenge Ilunga Makabu for the WBC cruiserweight title on the undercard of Jake Paul vs Tommy Fury on 26 February in Diriyah, Saudi Arabia. Makabu was confident in retaining his world title and made a statement about inflicting physical damage on Jack. Jack was more focused on his goal of winning the title and making history as the first Muslim fighter to become a world champion in Saudi Arabia. Jack dropped Makabu twice before winning the bout via TKO in the twelfth round, to capture the WBC title and becoming a three-weight world champion. The referee stopped the fight at 54 seconds of the final round. The fight was competitive throughout, with Jack demonstrated superior composure, speed, and accuracy, consistently outpacing Makabu. Makabu struggled with balance and often threw wild punches, although he did manage to land some effective body shots against Jack. The first knockdown took place in the fourth round, followed by a second knockdown in the eleventh round. After this, Jack continued to apply pressure on Makabu, who started to show signs of fatigue. In the final round, Jack launched a series of unanswered punches that led the referee to stop the fight. Jack received a $500,000 purse, while Makabu earned approximately $350,000.

==== Attempt at bridgerweight ====
On 6 July 2023, Skills Challenge Entertainment reported that Jack was expected to challenge Łukasz Różański (15-0, 14 KOs) for the WBC bridgerweight title later in the year, in Saudi Arabia. The WBC originally mandated Różański to defend the title against Kevin Lerena, however Lerena agreed to step aside to allow the fight between Różański and Jack. Jack was considered for a fight against Saul Álvarez, who was interested in pursuing a fifth divisional title. However, negotiations fell through due to Canelo's demands for a catch-weight of 180 pounds and a rehydration clause. On 16 September, Jack was declared champion in recess at cruiserweight. The fight did not come off, and on 22 March 2024 it was announced that Rozanski would instead defend his title against Lawrence Okolie in May. At this point, Jack considered retirement.

==== Cancelled Rozicki fight ====
Jack was reinstated to WBC cruiserweight champion in December 2024. On 13 January 2025, Jack was ordered by the WBC to defend his cruiserweight title against Ryan Rozicki.(20–1–1, 9 KOs), giving both teams until 4 February, to negotiate, before eventually going to purse bids. Three Lions Promotions were the lone bidders, securing the rights to the fight for $320,000 and scheduled to hold the fight in Canada in April. Rozicki's team scheduled a date and location for the fight, but on February 27, they were still awaiting Jack's signature on the contract. He had until the end of the month before the WBC would intervene. Jack was looking forward to returning to the ring after a two-year break. He intended to unify the cruiserweight division in 2025. He believed he was in very good shape and was training with coach Johnathon Banks, planning to modify his training schedule to accommodate Ramadan. On 17 March, it was officially announced that the fight would occur in Riyadh as part of the Saul 'Canelo' Álvarez and William Scull undercard on 3 May 2025. On 9 April, Rozicki had to withdraw because of a torn biceps he sustained during training. Jack was looking for a new opponent for his title defense, with Noel Mikaelian appearing as a possible challenger.

==== Jack vs. Mikaelian I, II ====
It was announced that Jack would defend his title against Noel Mikaelian (27–2, 2 KOs) on 3 May 2025 in Riyadh, Saudi Arabia. Jack retained his title via majority decision in a closely contested fight. The early rounds were tactical, with Jack attacking the body with jabs and a one-two combination, while Mikaelian pressured with volume punches and body shots. During the middle rounds, Mikaelian continued attacking the body, attempting to slow Jack's pace. Jack found his rhythm with successive right hands, regaining control during the sixth round. The body attack and hard punches from Jack's body shots began to tell, while Mikaelian increased his jab output but with reduced impact. During the championship rounds, Jack absorbed flurries from Mikaelian without hesitation, pressing forward and landing powerful rights. Mikaelian showed urgency to close off the fight. One judge scored it even 114-114, whist the other two scored it 115-113, 115-113 for Jack. Jack landed 122 of 369 punches thrown (33%), while Mikaelian landed 153 of 670 (23%).

Following the defeat, Mikaelian's promoter Don King appealed the decision to WBC, who then, on the 2 June 2025 ordered an immediate rematch between Jack and Mikaelian (27-3, 12 KOs), with purse bids scheduled for 1 July 2025. No deal was made and the fight headed to purse bids on 15 July. On the day of the purse bids, WBC were notified that a deal had been reached. On 11 October. the rematch was announced to take place on 13 December in Los Angeles at the Ace Mission Studios. Mikaelian was confident to reclaim the title, stating he believed he won the first fight despite the challenging circumstances he faced, including short notice and time zone changes. Mikaelian was set to have a slight advantage heading into the fight, as the Armenian population exceeded 200,000 in Los Angeles. The event was titled "Championing Mental Health presents CMH 2: Rematch Season," which aimed to raise awareness for mental health issues. The event was scheduled to be broadcast on Pay-Per-View for $29.99 across various platforms, with $1 of the proceeds donated to Championing Mental Health. During fight week, Jack was confident ahead of the fight, stating that Mikaelian did not deserve the rematch, despite the fight being a narrow majority decision and Jack being out landed in punches. Jack was referring to how he never received any rematches in his previous close decision fight, such as Stevenson, DeGale and Jean Pascal. He stated that he would have performed better had he not been inactive for 25 months. In a foul-filled bout, which saw both boxers deducted points, Mikaelian emerged victorious after 12 rounds, winning by unanimous decision and reclaiming the WBC title. The fight was competitive in the early rounds but turned into an intense inside battle with frequent exchanges and heated moments. In the middle rounds, Mikaelian focused on attacking Jack's body, which drained his energy, while Jack found openings for successful counterattacks. Tensions heightened, especially in the sixth and seventh rounds, resulting in a point deduction for Mikaelian for hitting behind the head in round seven. Jack was then deducted a point in the eighth round for hitting on the break. Mikaelian finished the fight strong, taking control in the later rounds. Jack had begun to reduce his pace since the seventh round and encountered difficulties in maintaining control. The judges scored the fight 116-110, 116-110, and 115-111 in favor of Mikaelian. During the post-fight, Jack hinted that this may have been one of his last fights, stating, “I don’t feel great. I had a great career, but we’ll see what’s next.”

== Personal life ==
Jack was born to a Gambian father and a Swedish mother. He was raised in his father's religion of Islam and still adheres to it to this day. Jack now resides in Las Vegas, Nevada.

Jack is a close friend of the Swedish actor Joel Kinnaman. He has helped Kinnaman physically prepare for roles in Robocop and Suicide Squad.

== Professional boxing record ==
36 fights	29 wins	4 losses
By knockout	17	1
By decision	11	3
By disqualification	1	0
Draws	3	

No.	Result	Record	Opponent	Type	Round, time	Date	Location	Notes
36	Loss	29–4–3	Noel Mikaelian	UD	12	13 Dec 2025	Ace Mission Studios, Los Angeles, California, US	Lost WBC cruiserweight title
35	Win	29–3–3	Noel Mikaelian	MD	12	3 May 2025	Anb Arena, Riyadh, Saudi Arabia	Retained WBC cruiserweight title
34	Win	28–3–3	Ilunga Makabu	TKO	12 (12), 0:54	26 Feb 2023	Diriyah Arena, Diriyah, Saudi Arabia	Won WBC cruiserweight title
33	Win	27–3–3	Richard Rivera	SD	10	20 Aug 2022	King Abdullah Sports City, Jeddah, Saudi Arabia	
32	Win	26–3–3	Hany Atiyo	KO	1 (10), 0:45	21 May 2022	Etihad Arena, Abu Dhabi, UAE	
31	Win	25–3–3	Samuel Crossed	KO	2 (10), 2:20	26 Nov 2021	Motospace Dubai Investment Park, Dubai, UAE	
30	Win	24–3–3	Dervin Colina	TKO	4 (10), 2:46	6 Jun 2021	Hard Rock Stadium, Miami Gardens, Florida, US	
29	Win	23–3–3	Blake McKernan	UD	8	28 Nov 2020	Staples Center, Los Angeles, California, US	
28	Loss	22–3–3	Jean Pascal	SD	12	28 Dec 2019	State Farm Arena, Atlanta, Georgia, US	For WBA (Regular) and WBC Silver light-heavyweight titles
27	Loss	22–2–3	Marcus Browne	UD	12	19 Jan 2019	MGM Grand Garden Arena, Paradise, Nevada, US	For vacant WBA interim and WBC Silver light-heavyweight titles
26	Draw	22–1–3	Adonis Stevenson	MD	12	19 May 2018	Air Canada Centre, Toronto, Ontario, Canada	For WBC light-heavyweight title
25	Win	22–1–2	Nathan Cleverly	TKO	5 (12), 2:47	26 Aug 2017	T-Mobile Arena, Paradise, Nevada, US	Won WBA (Regular) light-heavyweight title
24	Draw	21–1–2	James DeGale	MD	12	14 Jan 2017	Barclays Center, New York City, New York, US	Retained WBC super-middleweight title; For IBF, and vacant The Ring super-middleweight titles
23	Win	21–1–1	Lucian Bute	DQ	12	30 Apr 2016	DC Armory, Washington, DC, US	Retained WBC super-middleweight title; Originally an MD, later ruled a DQ after Bute failed a drug test
22	Win	20–1–1	George Groves	SD	12	12 Sep 2015	MGM Grand Garden Arena, Paradise, Nevada, US	Retained WBC super-middleweight title
21	Win	19–1–1	Anthony Dirrell	MD	12	24 Apr 2015	UIC Pavilion, Chicago, Illinois, US	Won WBC super-middleweight title
20	Win	18–1–1	Francisco Sierra	TKO	6 (10), 1:58	12 Dec 2014	Alamodome, San Antonio, Texas, US	
19	Win	17–1–1	Jason Escalera	UD	10	30 Aug 2014	Pearl Concert Theater, Paradise, Nevada, US	
18	Loss	16–1–1	Derek Edwards	TKO	1 (10), 1:01	28 Feb 2014	Turning Stone Resort Casino, Verona, New York, US	
17	Win	16–0–1	Rogelio Medina	TKO	6 (10), 2:30	6 Dec 2013	Little Creek Casino Resort, Shelton, Washington, US	
16	Draw	15–0–1	Marco Antonio Peribán	MD	10	12 Sep 2013	MGM Grand Marquee Ballroom, Paradise, Nevada, US	For WBC-NABF super-middleweight title
15	Win	15–0	Farah Ennis	UD	10	19 Jul 2013	The Joint, Paradise, Nevada, US	
14	Win	14–0	Michael Gbenga	KO	3 (8), 2:26	4 May 2013	MGM Grand Garden Arena, Paradise, Nevada, US	
13	Win	13–0	Don Mouton	UD	8	23 Feb 2013	Masonic Temple, Detroit, Michigan, US	
12	Win	12–0	Jonel Tapia	KO	1 (8), 1:47	2 Feb 2013	Cosmopolitan of Las Vegas, Paradise, Nevada, US	
11	Win	11–0	Alexander Brand	SD	8	11 May 2012	Texas Station, North Las Vegas, Nevada, US	
10	Win	10–0	Grover Young	UD	6	7 Mar 2012	B.B. King Blues Club & Grill, New York City, New York, US	
9	Win	9–0	Adam Collins	TKO	1 (6), 2:28	25 Dec 2011	Mandalay Bay Islander Ballroom, Paradise, Nevada, US	
8	Win	8–0	Eddie Caminero	TKO	5 (6), 1:47	21 Oct 2011	Foxwoods Resort Casino, Ledyard, Connecticut, US	
7	Win	7–0	Timothy Hall Jr.	TKO	2 (4), 1:31	29 Jul 2011	Cosmopolitan of Las Vegas, Paradise, Nevada, US	
6	Win	6–0	Hajro Sujak	TKO	5 (6)	4 Jun 2011	Boardwalk Hall, Atlantic City, New Jersey, US	
5	Win	5–0	Aliaksandr Paluyanau	TKO	3 (4)	10 Sep 2010	Baltiska hallen, Malmö, Sweden	
4	Win	4–0	Aleksandrs Taputs	TKO	1 (4), 2:28	14 Nov 2009	Maapohjahalli, Vaasa, Finland	
3	Win	3–0	Vadim Chromych	TKO	3 (4)	4 Sep 2009	Löfbergs Arena, Karlstad, Sweden	
2	Win	2–0	Dmitry Gavrilov	KO	1 (4), 0:47	8 Aug 2009	Ulvila, Finland	
1	Win	1–0	Maxim Nikonorov	UD	4	6 Jun 2009	Sporthall, Tidaholm, Sweden	

== Titles in boxing ==
=== Major world titles ===
- WBC super middleweight champion (168 lbs)
- WBA light heavyweight champion (Note: Badou Jack was considered the Primary champion upon the announcement of Andre Ward's retirement on September 21, 2017.) (175 lbs)
- WBC cruiserweight champion (200 lbs)

=== Secondary major world titles ===
- WBA (Regular) light heavyweight champion (175 lbs)

=== Honorary titles ===
- WBC cruiserweight champion in recess

== See also ==
- List of world super-middleweight boxing champions
- List of world light-heavyweight boxing champions
- List of world cruiserweight boxing champions
- List of boxing triple champions

== Notes and references ==
=== References ===
Olympic Games
Preceded by Jaysuma Saidy Ndure	Flag bearer for Gambia; Beijing 2008	Succeeded by Suwaibou Sanneh
Sporting positions
World boxing titles
Preceded by Anthony Dirrell	WBC super middleweight champion 24 April 2015 – 18 January 2017; Vacated	Vacant Title next held by David Benavidez
Preceded by Nathan Cleverly	WBA light-heavyweight champion Regular title 26 August – 21 September 2017; Promoted	Vacant Title next held by Jean Pascal
Preceded by Andre Ward as Super Champion	WBA light-heavyweight champion 21 – 23 September 2017; Vacated	Succeeded by Dmitry Bivol
Preceded by Ilunga Makabu	WBC cruiserweight champion 26 February – 16 September 2023; Vacated	Vacant Title next held by Noel Mikaelian
Preceded by Noel Mikaelian; Status changed	WBC cruiserweight champion 11 December 2024 – 13 December 2025	Succeeded by Noel Mikaelian
Awards
Previous: Keith Thurman vs. Shawn Porter	PBC Fight of the Year vs. James DeGale; 2017	Next: Deontay Wilder vs. Luis Ortiz
