= Lukas Wilaschek =

German boxer

Personal information
- Born: 30 April 1981 (age 45) Katowice, Upper Silesia, Poland
- Height: 181 cm (5 ft 11 in)

Boxing career
- Weight class: Junior middleweight, Middleweight
- Stance: orthodox

Boxing record
- Total fights: 23
- Wins: 22
- Win by KO: 7
- Losses: 1
Medal record
Men's boxing
Representing Germany
European Amateur Championships
Silver medal – second place	2002 Perm	Junior middleweight
Silver medal – second place	2004 Pula	Middleweight

Lukas Wilaschek (born 30 April 1981 in Katowice, Upper Silesia, Poland) is a German former professional boxer who won several medals at major events as an amateur and competed professionally from 2004 to 2008.

== Amateur career ==
2002 he lost the Euro junior middleweight final to Russian Andrey Mishin, in 2004 he competed at middleweight and lost again to a Russian in Gaydarbek Gaydarbekov.

At the 2004 Olympics he lost early to Oleg Mashkin.

== Professional career ==
Wilaschek turned pro in 2004 and won 22 of his 23 bouts. He lost his last fight to Robert Stieglitz.
