= Christopher Camat =

Filipino boxer (born 1979)

Personal information
- Full name: Christopher Camat
- Nationality: Filipino
- Born: September 7, 1979 (age 46) San Manuel, Pangasinan, Philippines
- Height: 5 ft 9 in (175 cm)
- Weight: 165 lb (75 kg)

Sport
- Sport: Boxing
- Weight class: Middleweight
- Club: Team Caltex
- Coached by: Nolito Velasco
Medal record
Men's boxing
Representing the Philippines
Asian Championships
Silver medal – second place	2004 Puerto Princesa	Middleweight

Christopher Camat (born September 7, 1979) is a Filipino-American retired amateur boxer. He captured two bronze medals in the middleweight division at the Southeast Asian Games (2001 and 2003), and later represented the Philippines at the 2004 Summer Olympics. Throughout his sporting career, Camat has been training as an elite athlete for Team Caltex Boxing Club under his head coach and mentor Nolito Velasco.

== Early life ==
Born and raised in Pangasinan, Camat emigrated to the United States at the age of ten. His father Eduardo left the nation alone for California in 1979, until he petitioned for his wife Mercedes and their three children (including Camat) to join and accompany him. Lasted for two years, Camat's father was deported back to Manila, when the U.S. immigration authorities discovered that he misrepresented his petition. While his father started a new family in Manila, Camat managed to remain in the United States with his mother and sisters despite their allegations over the deportation case.

Camat studied at Morro Bay High School in San Luis Obispo, California, where he lettered and excelled in boxing, basketball, football, and track and field. He trained in the Police Athletic League under his coach Pat Murphy, and eventually brought home numerous trophies in local tournaments, moving him up to second in the U.S. amateur boxing standings for the middleweight class. After graduating from high school, Camat offered a boxing scholarship at Northern Michigan University, but later deferred it because of his impending deportation. Admittedly, Camat resided in San Jose, California where he works as a finance manager for a car dealership.

== Career ==
As a member of the Philippine boxing squad, Camat made his official sporting debut at the 2001 Southeast Asian Games, where he claimed a bronze medal in the light middleweight class. The following year, at the 2002 Asian Games in Busan, South Korea, Camat expectedly failed to surpass Pakistani boxer Kashif Mumtaz Karim in the opening bout with a decisive score of 11–18, despite displaying a clean fight that could have brought him into the medal rounds.

Recovering from a fatal loss at the Asian Games, Camat added another bronze medal to his career hardware, when he lost the semifinal match to Thailand's Somchai Chimlum in the men's middleweight division at the 2003 Southeast Asian Games in Hanoi, Vietnam.

Camat qualified for his naturalized Filipino squad in the men's middleweight division (75 kg) at the 2004 Summer Olympics in Athens by receiving a berth and finishing second behind Kazakhstan's Gennady Golovkin from the Asian Championships in Puerto Princesa, Palawan. Camat was also expected to become the Filipino flag bearer in the opening ceremony, but later surpassed his privilege to fellow boxer Romeo Brin, as he decided to witness his action and prepare fully for the next day's bout. He ousted his opening match to a vastly superior Russian boxer and top medal contender Gaydarbek Gaydarbekov in an effortless decision 13–35.
