= Mohammed Sahraoui =

Tunisian boxer (born 1978)

Personal information
- Nationality: Tunisian
- Born: 23 February 1978 (age 47)

Sport
- Sport: Boxing

Mohammed Sahraoui (born 23 February 1978) is a Tunisian boxer. He competed in the men's middleweight event at the 2004 Summer Olympics.
