= Khotso Motau =

South African boxer

Khotso Godfrey Motau (born 7 October 1981) is a South African former professional boxer who competed from 2004 to 2009. As an amateur he represented his country at the 2004 Summer Olympics.

Motau, nicknamed "Masterpiece" was born in Soweto, a township outside of Johannesburg. He qualified for the 2004 Summer Olympics, where he fought as a middleweight. He lost in his only bout to Ukraine's Oleg Maskin. Motau has been compared to South African boxing great Dingaan Thobela.
