= Ha Dabateer =

Chinese boxer (born 1977)

Personal information
- Nationality: Chinese
- Born: 27 April 1977 (age 49) Chifeng, Inner Mongolia, China

Sport
- Sport: Boxing
- Weight class: Light middleweight, Middleweight
Medal record
Asian Championships
Gold medal – first place	2002 Seremban	Light middleweight

Ha Dabateer (born 27 April 1977) is a Chinese boxer. He competed in the men's middleweight event at the 2004 Summer Olympics.
