= Oleg Mashkin =

Ukrainian boxer (born 1979)

Personal information
- Nationality: Ukrainian
- Born: 30 May 1979 (age 47) Mykolaiv, Ukrainian SSR, Soviet Union

Sport
- Sport: Boxing
Medal record
Men's amateur boxing
Representing Ukraine
European Championships
| Gold medal – first place | 2002 Perm | Middleweight |
Junior World Championships
| Silver medal – second place | 1996 Havana | Lightweight |

Oleg Mashkin (Ukrainian: Олег Валерійович Машкін; born 30 May 1979) is a Ukrainian boxer. He competed in the men's middleweight event at the 2004 Summer Olympics.
