= Floyd Mayweather Jr. vs. Conor McGregor =

2017 professional crossover boxing match

The Money Fight
- Date: August 26, 2017
- Venue: T-Mobile Arena; Paradise, Nevada, United States
- Title on the line: ceremonial WBC (Money) light middleweight title

Tale of the tape
Boxer	Floyd Mayweather Jr.	Conor McGregor
Nickname	Money	The Notorious
Hometown	Grand Rapids, Michigan, U.S.	Crumlin, Dublin, Ireland
Purse	$280,000,000	$130,000,000
Pre-fight record	49–0 (26 KO)	0–0 (Professional boxing); 21–3 (18 KO) (MMA)
Age	40 years, 6 months	29 years, 1 month
Height	5 ft 8 in (173 cm)	5 ft 9 in (175 cm)
Weight	149 1/2 lb (68 kg)	153 lb (69 kg)
Style	Orthodox	Southpaw
Recognition	5-division world champion	2-division world champion in the UFC

Result
- Mayweather Jr. wins via 10th-round TKO

Floyd Mayweather Jr. vs. Conor McGregor, billed as The Money Fight, was a professional crossover boxing match between undefeated eleven-time five-division boxing world champion Floyd Mayweather Jr. and two-division mixed martial arts (MMA) world champion and, at the time, UFC World Lightweight Champion and former Undisputed World Featherweight Champion Conor McGregor. The fight took place on August 26, 2017 at T-Mobile Arena in Paradise, Nevada, United States. It was scheduled for twelve rounds, at the light middleweight limit (154 lbs; 69.9 kg). The event recorded the second highest pay-per-view buy rate in history, behind Mayweather vs. Pacquiao.

Mayweather extended his professional boxing undefeated streak to 50 victories and 0 defeats (50–0), surpassing the 49–0 record of Hall of Famer Rocky Marciano, after defeating McGregor by technical knockout (TKO) in the 10th round. Mayweather's guaranteed disclosed paycheck was $100 million and McGregor's guaranteed disclosed paycheck was $30 million. However, the purse for the two fighters was expected to be substantially higher for each, with Mayweather reportedly earning $280 million from the fight and McGregor earning $130 million.

== Background ==
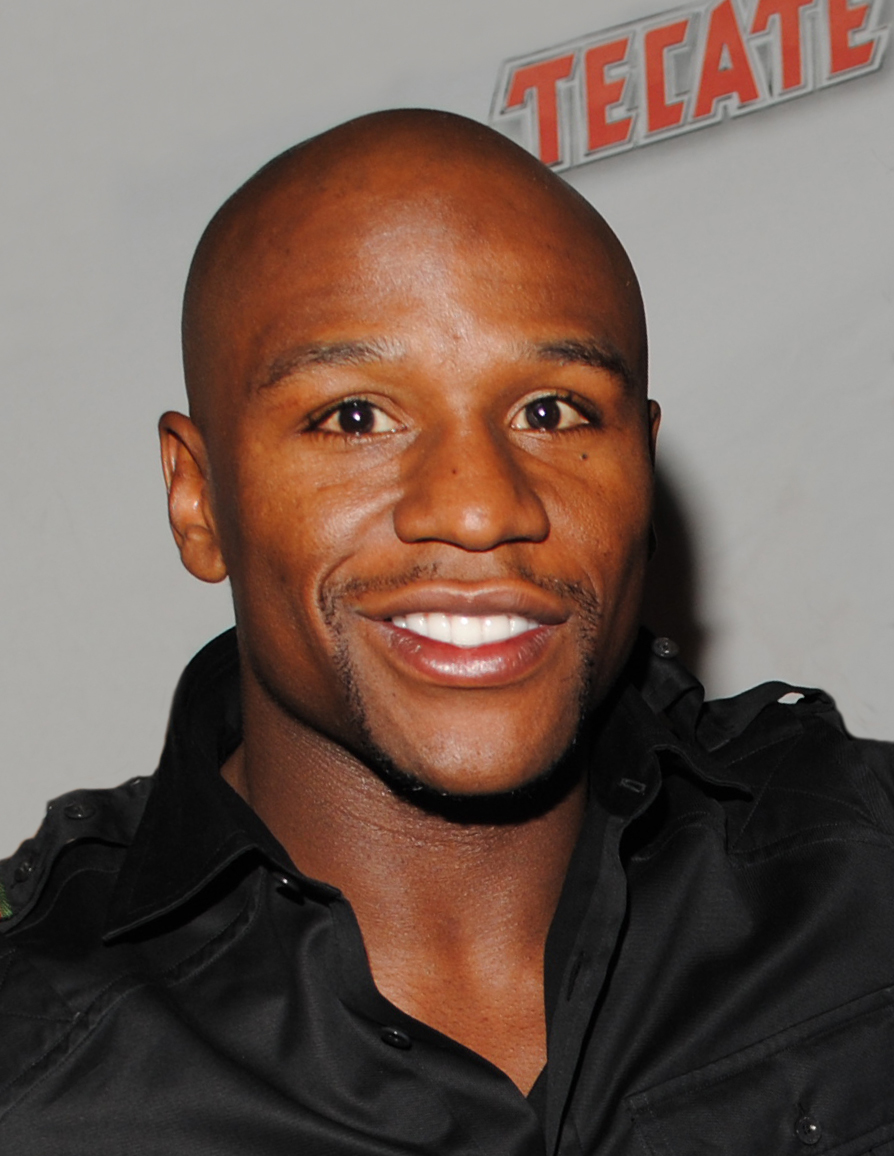
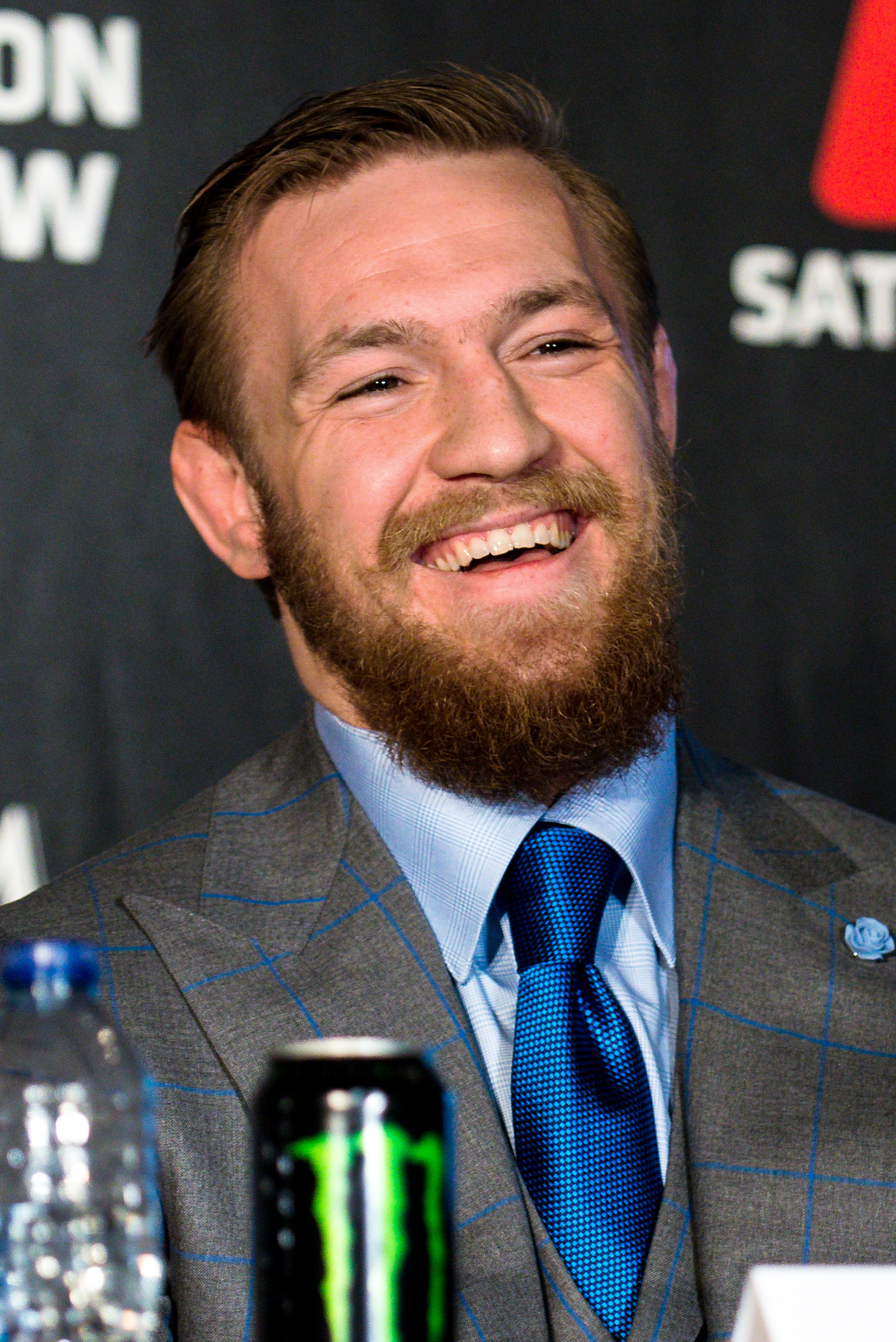
Floyd Mayweather Jr. (left) and Conor McGregor (right)

During his successful UFC mixed martial arts career McGregor maintained an interest in boxing and entertained the idea of a "money fight" with Mayweather. UFC president Dana White dismissed the rumors of a fight with Mayweather on The Dan Patrick Show, stating that Mayweather would have to contact him since McGregor was under contract with the UFC. White even went as far as stating, "Here's what I think the chances are [of the fight happening]: About the same of me being the backup quarterback for Brady on Sunday," referring to Super Bowl LI. In January 2017, it was reported that the two parties had entered an "exploratory phase" in negotiating a potential match between Mayweather and McGregor. On The Herd with Colin Cowherd, White openly offered to pay Mayweather $25 million to hold the proposed bout during a UFC event. He also predicted that pay-per-view viewership of the hypothetical bout could possibly rival Mayweather vs. Pacquiao.

On March 7, 2017, Mayweather called upon McGregor to "sign the paper" and "make it happen", arguing that "if Conor McGregor really wants this fight to happen, stop blowing smoke up everybody's ass." On March 10, 2017, Mayweather stated that only a fight with McGregor would make him come out of retirement. On March 16, 2017, Dana White backpedaled on his stance against a Mayweather–McGregor bout and said that he would not deprive McGregor of a massive payday. On May 18, 2017, McGregor reportedly agreed to all of Mayweather's updated terms and signed the contract. The official confirmation of the fight was made on June 14. An international press tour was held from July 11–14.

In July 2017, IBF junior lightweight champion Gervonta Davis was reported to be going to participate in a co-main event. Earlier in 2017 McGregor called Mayweather a Malteser with eyeballs. On July 19, additional undercard details were released. By that time, three names had been confirmed on the undercard, including British amateur boxer Savannah Marshall, who signed up earlier in the year with Mayweather Promotions, and Badou Jack, who stepped up to fight at light heavyweight. On July 26, 2017, it was announced that former welterweight titleholder Shawn Porter would be headlining the preliminary card, facing Thomas Dulorme. On August 17, Porter pulled out of the fight for personal reasons, including a death in the family. He was replaced by Cuban boxer Yordenis Ugás. On July 29, it was reported that Gervonta Davis would defend his IBF junior lightweight title against former WBO champion Roman 'Rocky' Martinez. Martínez was dropped due to not having enough time to make the 130 pound [59 kg] limit. Instead Davis has been rescheduled to fight unbeaten prospect Francisco Fonseca. On August 9, 2017, it was announced that Nathan Cleverly would defend his WBA light heavyweight title against Money Team fighter Badou Jack.

A mural was painted in McGregor's Dublin training facility, Straight Blast Gym, depicting McGregor hitting Mayweather with a left-handed punch.

== Fight card ==
Main Card (PPV)
Weight class				Method	Round	Time	Notes
Light middleweight (154 lbs.)	(United States) Floyd Mayweather Jr.	def.	(Republic of Ireland) Conor McGregor	TKO	10	1:05	(Note: For the ceremonial WBC (Money) light middleweight title)
Junior lightweight (130 lbs.)	(United States) Gervonta Davis	def.	(Nicaragua) Francisco Fonseca	KO	8	0:39	(Note: For vacant IBF junior lightweight title (only Fonseca is eligible to win the title))
Light heavyweight (175 lbs.)	(Sweden) Badou Jack	def.	(United Kingdom) Nathan Cleverly (c)	TKO	5	2:47	(Note: For WBA (Regular) light heavyweight title)
Cruiserweight (200 lbs.)	(United States) Andrew Tabiti	def.	(United States) Steve Cunningham	Decision (unanimous) (97–93, 100–90, 100–90)	10		(Note: For vacant USBA cruiserweight title)
Preliminary Card (Fox prelims)
Welterweight (147 lbs.)	(Cuba) Yordenis Ugás	def.	(Puerto Rico) Thomas Dulorme	Decision (unanimous) (94–91, 93–92, 93–92)	10
Welterweight (147 lbs.)	(United States) Juan Heraldez	def.	(Mexico) Jose Miguel Borrego	Decision (unanimous) (98–96, 97–92, 97–92)	10
Preliminary Card (Unaired)
Super middleweight (168 lbs.)	(United States) Marcos Hernandez	def.	(United States) Kevin Newman II	Decision (unanimous) (59–54, 59–54, 57–56)	6
Super middleweight (168 lbs.)	(United Kingdom) Savannah Marshall	def.	(United States) Sydney LeBlanc	Decision (unanimous) (40–36, 40–36, 40–36)	4

== Fight details ==
=== Broadcasting ===
==== Domestic ====
In the United States, the fight was televised via Showtime pay-per-view, available through both traditional television providers and various digital services, including the Showtime PPV website and apps, and UFC.tv. Fathom Events organized public screenings at venues such as movie theaters. On July 10, 2017, it was announced that pricing for the PPV in the U.S. would mirror that of Mayweather vs. Pacquiao, being set at US$89.95 (with an additional $10 charge for high definition).

The fight was called by Showtime's lead commentary team of Mauro Ranallo (play-by-play), Al Bernstein (color), and Paulie Malignaggi (color), along with ringside reporter Jim Gray. Showtime produced a four-part documentary series, All Access: Mayweather vs. McGregor, focusing on the preparations for the fight. Fox Sports (the television rightsholder of the UFC) provided shoulder programming for the fight, including coverage of the press tour on UFC Tonight, as well as a pre-show and preliminary card on Fox and Fox Deportes.

Due to the high demand, a large number of television providers, as well as UFC.tv, experienced technical issues with their carriage of the PPV, including errors, buffering and low video quality. The main event was delayed by an hour from its projected start time in order to address these problems. Following the fight, a class-action lawsuit was proposed in Oregon against Showtime Networks for unlawful trading practices and unjust enrichment, alleging that the network knowingly advertised a level of quality it was unable to deliver with the amount of bandwidth it allocated for the PPV stream. Showtime and the UFC stated that they were investigating their respective customer complaints, and would issue refunds on a case-by-case basis.

==== International ====
Country	Broadcaster
Albania	SuperSport
Argentina	Fox Premium
Australia	Main Event
Austria	DAZN
Azerbaijan	CBC Sport
Belarus	Belarus 5
Belgium	Eleven Sports
Bosnia and Herzegovina	Sport Klub
Brazil	Canal Combate PPV
Brunei	Astro PPV
Bulgaria	Mtel Sport
Croatia	Sport Klub
Croatia	RTL Televizija
Cambodia	CTN
China	CCTV-5
Cyprus	CytaVision
Czech Republic	Nova Sport 1
Denmark	Viaplay PPV
Estonia	Viaplay PPV
Fiji	Sky Pacific PPV
Finland	Viaplay PPV
France	Canal+
Georgia	Silk Universal
Germany	DAZN
Greece	Cosmote Sport
Hong Kong	Now TV PPV
Hungary	Sport 1
Iceland	Stöð 2 Sport
Ireland	Sky Sports Box Office
India	VEQTA
Israel	Sport 1
Israel	5 LIVE
Indonesia	tvOne
Indonesia	iflix
Italy	UFC PPV
Japan	DAZN
Kazakhstan	Khabar
Kyrgyzstan	KTRK
Latvia	Viaplay PPV
Macedonia	Sport Klub
Malaysia	Astro PPV
Mexico	Azteca 7
Mexico	Canal 5
Moldova	ProTV Chișinău
Montenegro	Sport Klub
Myanmar	SkyNet Sports
Netherlands	Fox Sports
New Zealand	Sky Arena
Nigeria	SuperSport
Norway	Viaplay PPV
Philippines	Cignal PPV
Poland	Cyfrowy Polsat PPV
Portugal	Sport TV
Puerto Rico	Claro TV PPV
Romania	Pro TV
Russia	Channel One
Serbia	Sport Klub
Singapore	SuperSports PPV
Slovakia	Dajto
Slovenia	Sport Klub
South Africa	SuperSport
South Korea	KBS2
South Korea	SpoTV On
Spain	beIN Sports
Sweden	Viaplay PPV
Switzerland	DAZN
Taiwan	Eleven Sports
Tajikistan	Varzish Sport
Thailand	Workpoint TV
Turkey	S Sport
Ukraine	2+2
Middle East and North Africa	OSN Sports Box Office
United Kingdom	Sky Sports Box Office (television)
United Kingdom	BBC Radio
United States	Showtime PPV
United States	AFN Sports
Uzbekistan	Uzreport TV
Vietnam	Kplus

Sky Sports Box Office held broadcasting rights to the fight in McGregor's native Ireland, and the United Kingdom. Although it was initially believed that the price would match that of the U.S. PPV, the price was set at €24.95 (£19.95). The fight was called for Sky Sports by lead commentator, Adam Smith alongside Carl Froch and British MMA fighter and UFC analyst, Dan Hardy. British radio rights were held by the BBC, with Mike Costello and Steve Bunce on commentary for BBC Radio 5 Live.

In Hispanic America, the fight aired on Fox Premium Action. In Brazil, the event aired on Globosat-owned Combate.

==== Unauthorized online streams ====
As with Mayweather vs. Pacquiao, it was expected that many viewers would seek unauthorized streams of the fight due to the high cost of the PPV. Showtime successfully received a preliminary injunction against the registrant of a group of 44 websites who planned to illegally stream the fight in violation of its copyrights, and all parties in active concert or participation with them.

It was estimated that nearly 2.93 million viewers illegally streamed the fight, on video streaming websites and social media channels such as Facebook, YouTube and Periscope.

=== Purses ===
Mayweather was expected to earn at least $100 million, increasing up to four times that amount upon the event achieving all its metrics. McGregor was expected to earn $75 million, but both men signed non-disclosure agreements barring them from publicly communicating the financial details. According to the Nevada State Athletic Commission, Mayweather would earn a guaranteed purse of $100 million and McGregor was guaranteed $30 million.

In a Q&A session in Glasgow in September 2017, McGregor revealed, had he been disqualified, he would have been fined $10 million. The referee also warned him, had he lifted a leg, he would have not been warned and got a straight point deduction.

After the fight Conor McGregor revealed that he earned around $100 million in total.

Guaranteed Base Purses

- Gervonta Davis ($600,000) vs. Francisco Fonseca ($35,000)
- Nathan Cleverly ($100,000) vs. Badou Jack ($750,000)
- Andrew Tabiti ($100,000) vs. Steve Cunningham ($100,000)
- Thomas Dulorme ($75,000) vs. Yordenis Ugás ($50,000)
- Juan Heraldez ($12,500) vs. Jose Borrego ($5000)
- Kevin Newman II ($7500) vs. Marcos Hernandez ($7000)
- Savannah Marshall ($5000) vs. Sydney LeBlanc ($3500)

=== Championship belt ===
On August 23, 2017, the World Boxing Council (WBC) revealed that the ceremonial "Money" status recognition belt of World Light Middleweight Championship would be on the line, the winner of the fight will be crowned as the ceremonial WBC (Money) World Light Middleweight Champion; The ceremonial world championship belt is made from Italian-made alligator leather and encrusted with 3.3 pounds (1.5 kg) of 24-karat gold, 3,360 diamonds, 600 sapphires, and 300 emeralds.

=== Officials and rules ===
On August 16, 2017, the officials were named for the fight:

- Referee: Robert Byrd
- Judges: Burt Clements, Dave Moretti, and Guido Cavalleri

Both athletes initially agreed to box in 10-ounce (285 g) gloves per Nevada State Athletic Commission (NSAC) rules which require 10-ounce (285 g) gloves for boxing matches contracted over 147 pounds [67 kg] (the fight is contracted at 154 pounds [70 kg]). McGregor, accustomed to wearing 4-ounce (113 g) gloves in his UFC fights, wanted 8-ounce (225 g) gloves for the fight. Mayweather agreed, and both athletes submitted formal requests to box in 8-ounce (225 g) gloves, which was granted by the NSAC.

=== Betting ===
Experts expected that more money would be bet on the fight than any other boxing match in history; estimates ranged up to $85 million in bets. There were six separate $1 million bets on Mayweather in Las Vegas bookmakers, but a large majority of bets overall were on the underdog, McGregor.

=== Live gate and revenue ===
Nevada State Athletic Commission announced the live gate for the event was $55,414,865.79 from 13,094 tickets sold and 137 complimentary tickets given out. This was far less than the Mayweather vs. Pacquiao fight which grossed $72,198,500 from a paid attendance of 16,219 in 2015, despite claims from Ellerbe and Mayweather that it did more than $80 million.

Showtime Sports’ Stephen Espinoza told the LA Times the fight was expected to generate around 4.4 million domestic buys, which would fall just short of the 4.6 million record which was set by Mayweather-Pacquiao. On December 14, 2017, Showtime officially announced 4.3 million domestic buys, making it the 2nd highest buy rate in pay-per-view history.

Sky Sports initially estimated the fight garnered over a million PPV buys in the UK and grossed in excess of £20 million, which would've surpassed the record set in April 2017 when Anthony Joshua defeated Wladimir Klitschko in front of 90,000 at the Wembley Stadium. This would've also meant the fight generated more buys in the UK than Mayweather-Pacquiao which took place in 2015. Figures later revealed by the Broadcasters' Audience Research Board showed the Mayweather–McGregor fight drew 874,000 PPV buys in the UK.

== Fight summary ==
At the weigh-in, Mayweather tipped the scales at 149.5 lbs, with McGregor at 153 lbs. On the night of the fight, McGregor weighed nearly 20 lbs heavier than Mayweather. Mayweather and McGregor entered the ring following the Irish and American national anthems; the Irish singer, songwriter and multi-instrumentalist Imelda May performed on behalf of Conor McGregor, followed by the American singer-songwriter and actor Demi Lovato, who was personally chosen by Mayweather.

Mayweather was expected to dominate the fight early but McGregor started strong and was ahead on one judge's card for the first few rounds, due in part to Mayweather using the rope-a-dope technique in the early stages. Because of this, the fight looked closer than it actually was due to McGregor dominating the first 3 rounds and Mayweather turning his back to him most of the time. Mayweather eventually abandoned his usual stick-and-move style in order to knock McGregor out. As the fight progressed, McGregor began to fatigue heavily. In Round 9, Mayweather landed a series of punches to McGregor's face, and the onslaught continued into Round 10, when referee Robert Byrd eventually called the fight in favor of Mayweather after McGregor failed to defend himself.

After the match Mayweather stated that he had expected McGregor to be a fast starter and had allowed him to deliver his heavy blows early. McGregor on the other hand was disappointed by what he saw as an early stoppage, but respected the referee's decision. Former boxers such as George Foreman and Evander Holyfield expressed their impression regarding McGregor's boxing skills and the competitiveness of the fight, with Foreman claiming that experts who criticized the fight "should apologize. It was competitive". Mike Tyson gave McGregor an "A grade" for his performance, stating he was impressed. The fight was lauded for its entertaining and exciting nature, especially when compared to Mayweather's most recent bouts.

Mayweather announced in his post-fight interview that he had fought his final boxing match and would officially retire from the sport. Mayweather stated "Any guy that's calling me out? Forget it," putting an end to his boxing career. McGregor said in his post-fight interview that he would be willing to box again and that he would return to mixed martial arts and the UFC.

=== Undercard fights ===
Gervonta Davis failed to make weight at the August 25 weigh in, forcing the IBF to strip him of his title. The title was declared vacant, but would still be on the line for Francisco Fonseca if he secured victory. Davis would go on to win by KO in the eighth round. Nathan Cleverly lost his WBA light heavyweight title to Badou Jack in a one-sided bout which ended when the referee stopped the fight in the fifth. Cleverly retired from boxing after the fight.

== See also ==
- 2017 in combat sports
- 2017 in UFC
- Muhammad Ali vs. Antonio Inoki
- Anthony Joshua vs. Francis Ngannou
- Tyson Fury vs. Francis Ngannou
