= Martin Parlagi =

Slovak boxer

Personal information
- Nationality: Slovak
- Born: 26 March 1988 (age 38) Vranov nad Topľou, Slovak Socialist Republic, Czechoslovak Socialist Republic (now Slovakia)
- Height: 5 ft 6 1/2 in (1.69 m)
- Weight: Featherweight; Super-featherweight; Lightweight

Boxing career
- Reach: 70 in (178 cm)
- Stance: Orthodox

Boxing record
- Total fights: 33
- Wins: 27
- Win by KO: 15
- Losses: 5
- Draws: 1

Martin Parlagi (born 26 March 1988) is a Slovak professional boxer.

== Amateur career ==
Parlagi's amateur record includes about 220 fights with 190 victories. He participated in the World Amateur Boxing Championships in 2007 and 2009, although both times he was eliminated in the round of 32. His best amateur result in a major competition was reaching the quarterfinals of the 2008 European Amateur Boxing Championships. He attempted, but failed, to qualify for the 2008 Summer Olympics.

== Professional career ==
Parlagi turned professional in 2011. His biggest professional win so far came in 2012 when he defeated Michal Dufek for the vacant Czech lightweight title.

== Professional boxing record ==
30 fights	25 wins	4 losses
By knockout	14	1
By decision	11	3
Draws	1	

No.	Result	Record	Opponent	Type	Round, time	Date	Location	Notes
30	Loss	25–4–1	(Rwanda) Patrick Kinigamazi	UD	10	28 Jun 2019	Theatre du Leman, Geneva, Switzerland	
29	Loss	25–3–1	(United Kingdom) Alex Dilmaghani	TKO	8 (10), 0:44	25 May 2019	(United Kingdom) Victoria Warehouse, Manchester, England	
28	Win	25–2–1	(Czech Republic) Michal Dufek	UD	10	30 Dec 2018	Lucerna Hall, Prague, Czech Republic	Won vacant Czech lightweight title
27	Win	24–2–1	(Hungary) Roland Petrovics	TKO	1 (4)	18 Aug 2018	(Slovenia) Kaluža, Slovakia	
26	Win	23–2–1	(Hungary) Attila Csereklye	TKO	4 (6), 1:27	23 Jun 2018	Grandhotel Pupp, Karlovy Vary, Czech Republic	
25	Win	22–2–1	(Tanzania) Nasibu Ramadhani	UD	6	4 Mar 2018	Golf Club, Poděbrady, Czech Republic	
24	Win	21–2–1	(Poland) Krzysztof Rogowski	TKO	3 (4), 2:10	14 Oct 2017	(Slovenia) Steel Aréna, Kosiče, Slovakia	
23	Draw	20–2–1	(Ukraine) Oleg Yefimovych	SD	10	6 Nov 2016	Parkovy Convention Centre, Kyiv, Ukraine	For WBA Continental (Europe) featherweight title
22	Win	20–2	(Tanzania) Francis Miyeyusho	KO	2 (10)	2 Jul 2016	Burtarna U Peti Buku, Ústí nad Labem, Czech Republic	Won vacant UBO Inter-Continental featherweight title
21	Win	19–2	(Hungary) Tamas Laska	UD	6	23 Apr 2016	Sono, Brno, Czech Republic	
20	Win	18–2	(Georgia (country)) Artur Movsesian	TKO	2 (4), 2:20	5 Mar 2016	Home Monitoring Aréna, Plzeň, Czech Republic	
19	Win	17–2	(Czech Republic) Jiri Jaros	UD	4	19 Dec 2015	Hospudka Eden, Ústí nad Labem, Czech Republic	
18	Loss	16–2	(United Kingdom) Ben Jones	UD	10	30 Oct 2015	(United Kingdom) Troxy, London, England	
17	Win	16–1	(Hungary) Oszkar Fiko	UD	6	6 Mar 2015	Spolecenske Centrum Trutnovska, Trutnov, Czech Republic	
16	Win	15–1	(Poland) Krzysztof Rogowski	KO	1 (6), 1:30	19 Dec 2014	Conference Hall IC, Broumov, Czech Republic	
15	Loss	14–1	(United Kingdom) Marco McCullough	UD	10	20 Jun 2014	(United Kingdom) Waterfront Hall, Belfast, Northern Ireland	For vacant WBO European featherweight title
14	Win	14–0	(Bosnia and Herzegovina) Adnan Zilic	KO	1 (4), 2:01	1 Mar 2014	Mestske Divadlo, Jičín, Czech Republic	
13	Win	13–0	(Belarus) Khavazhy Khatsyhau	UD	6	30 Dec 2013	Lucerna Hall, Prague, Czech Republic	
12	Win	12–0	(Hungary) Csaba Toth	KO	2 (6), 2:02	21 Dec 2013	Hotel Palcat, Tábor, Czech Republic	
11	Win	11–0	(Belarus) Anton Bekish	TKO	1 (6), 0:55	28 Sep 2013	Spolecensky dum Strelnice, Děčín, Czech Republic	
10	Win	10–0	(Hungary) Zoltan Horvath	UD	6	17 Mar 2013	Arena Slavie, Prague, Czech Republic	
9	Win	9–0	(Slovakia) Peter Balaz	TKO	1 (4), 2:42	7 Feb 2013	Spolecenske Centrum Trutnovska, Trutnov, Czech Republic	
8	Win	8–0	(Czech Republic) Michal Dufek	UD	10	21 Dec 2012	Sluneta, Ústí nad Labem, Czech Republic	Won vacant Czech lightweight title
7	Win	7–0	(Poland) Rafal Piotrowski	TKO	1 (6), 2:58	15 Nov 2012	Vodova Arena, Brno, Czech Republic	
6	Win	6–0	(Poland) Maurycy Gojko	UD	6	23 Sep 2012	Hotel Hilton, Prague, Czech Republic	
5	Win	5–0	(Poland) Rafal Piotrowski	UD	4	11 Aug 2012	Hospudka Eden, Ústí nad Labem, Czech Republic	
4	Win	4–0	(Slovakia) Jozef Gabris	TKO	1 (4), 2:57	5 Apr 2012	Vodova Arena, Brno, Czech Republic	
3	Win	3–0	(Slovakia) Roman Rafael	TKO	1 (4), 2:34	24 Mar 2012	Tabor Arena, Maribor, Slovenia	
2	Win	2–0	(Poland) Damian Lawniczak	UD	4	17 Dec 2011	Ústí nad Labem, Czech Republic	
1	Win	1–0	(Czech Republic) Miroslav Prochazka	TKO	1 (4), 1:16	29 Nov 2011	Arena Sparta,, Prague, Czech Republic	
