= Samir Ziani =

French boxer

Personal information
- Nationality: French
- Born: 19 July 1990 (age 35) France
- Height: 5 ft 6 in (168 cm)
- Weight: Super-featherweight; Lightweight

Boxing career
- Stance: Southpaw

Boxing record
- Total fights: 40
- Wins: 36
- Win by KO: 8
- Losses: 3
- Draws: 1

Samir Ziani (born 19 July 1990) is a French professional boxer who has held the European super-featherweight.

== Professional career ==
Ziani made his professional debut on 21 May 2010, scoring a four-round points decision (PTS) victory against Jerry Cagniac at the Salle Polyvalente des Ramiers in Blagnac, France.

He compiled a record of 8–0–1 (1 KO) before defeating Carel Sandon via ninth-round corner retirement (RTD) on 8 July 2011, capturing the vacant WBC International Silver lightweight title at the Piazza XX Settembre in Civitanova Marche, Italy. After retaining his title with a unanimous decision (UD) victory against Ruddy Encarnacion in January 2012, Ziani defeated Andrey Kudryavtsev via UD on 29 April at the Donbass Arena in Kyiv, Ukraine, capturing the vacant WBA International lightweight title.

Following four more victories, one by stoppage, he suffered the first defeat of his career on 7 December 2013 at the Gymnase Georges Racine in Clichy, France, losing by twelve-round UD against Samir Kasmi in a bid for the vacant European Union super-featherweight title.

He bounced back with a PTS victory against Sebastien Cornu in March 2014 before defeating Yoann Portallier on 6 June at the Salle Polyvalente des Ramiers, capturing the French super-featherweight title via UD over ten rounds.

In his next fight he suffered the second defeat of his career, losing by UD over ten rounds in December 2014 against future IBF lightweight champion Richard Commey. Following the loss, Ziani went on a five-fight winning streak before facing Guillame Frenois for the vacant European super-featherweight title. The fight took place on 10 November 2016 at the Halle Georges Carpentier in Paris, France. All three judges scored the bout 115–113 in favour of Frenois, handing Ziani his third professional defeat.

After scoring two wins in April 2017, Ziani faced reigning French super-featherweight champion and former foe Samir Kasmi in a rematch on 18 May at the Cirque d'hiver in Paris. Ziani got his revenge over Kasmi with a ten-round majority decision (MD) victory to capture the French title for a second time. Two judges scored the bout 97–93 and 97–94 in favour of Ziani, while the third judge scored it a draw with 95–95.

Following three PTS victories, he made a second attempt at the vacant European super-featherweight title, facing Juli Giner on 2 February 2019 at the Palau Olímpic Vall d'Hebron in Barcelona, Spain. Ziani captured the vacant title with a sixth-round stoppage via RTD after Giner quit in his corner at the end of the round. After a PTS win against Wallington Orobio in a non-title fight in April, Ziani retained his European title with a UD victory against Faroukh Kourbanov on 26 October in Agen, France, with one judge scoring the bout 119–109 while the other two scored it 116–112.

In the second defence of his title, Ziani faced Alex Dilmaghani on 5 September 2020 at the Production Park Studios in South Kirkby, England. After eleven closely contested rounds, Ziani was behind on the judges' scorecards. At the end of the eleventh, Ziani caused Dilmaghani to stagger across the ring after a sustained attack. The champion followed up with a three-punch combination which visibly hurt the challenger. In the twelfth and final round Ziani resumed his assault, forcing Dilmaghani to the canvas twice, with referee Giuseppe Quartarone ruling both as slips. Ziani, now landing punches with ease, caught Dilmaghani with a left hook to send the challenger to the canvas with 30 seconds of the fight remaining, scoring the first official knockdown of the fight. Dilmaghani made it back to his left before Quartarone reached the count of ten, only to be knocked into the ropes and onto the canvas for a second time. Dilmaghani again made it to his feet but Quartarone decided to call a halt to the contest, handing Ziani a twelfth-round technical knockout (TKO) victory. At the time of the stoppage, Ziani was behind on two of the judges' scorecards with 106–103 and 105–104, while the third judge scored in favour of Ziani with 105–104.

Ziani was booked to face Serif Gurdijeljac for the vacant IBF Inter-Continental super-featherweight title on 27 November 2021. He won the fight by a ninth-round technical knockout, which his second consecutive stoppage victory.

== Professional boxing record ==
40 fights	36 wins	3 losses
By knockout	8	0
By decision	28	3
Draws	1	

No.	Result	Record	Opponent	Type	Round, time	Date	Location	Notes
40	Win	36–3–1	Jordan Rodriguez	UD	10	27 Apr 2024	Salle Vallier, Marseille, France	Retained WBC International Silver super-featherweight title
39	Win	35–3–1	Jose Macias Enriquez	MD	10	15 Dec 2023	Palais des Sports de Gerland, Lyon, France	Won vacant WBC International Silver super-featherweight title
38	Win	34–3–1	Hector Betancourt	UD	8	3 Mar 2023	Salle Pollyvalente des Ramiers, Blagnac, France	
37	Win	33–3–1	Serif Gurdijeljac	TKO	9 (12)	27 Nov 2021	Salle Mory, Villeneuve-sur-Lot, France	Won vacant IBF Inter-Continental super-featherweight title
36	Win	32–3–1	Alex Dilmaghani	TKO	12 (12), 2:51	5 Sep 2020	Production Park Studios, South Kirkby, England	Retained European super-featherweight title
35	Win	31–3–1	Faroukh Kourbanov	UD	12	26 Oct 2019	Agen Stadium, Agen, France	Retained European super-featherweight title
34	Win	30–3–1	Wallington Orobio	PTS	6	5 Apr 2019	Salle Pollyvalente des Ramiers, Blagnac, France	
33	Win	29–3–1	Juli Giner	RTD	6 (12), 3:00	2 Feb 2019	Palau Olimpic Vall d'Hebron, Barcelona, Spain	Won vacant European super-featherweight title
32	Win	28–3–1	Michael Dufek	PTS	8	22 Jun 2018	Gymnase St. Exupéry, Blagnac, France	
31	Win	27–3–1	Dame Seck	PTS	6	14 Apr 2018	Gymnase Massot, Le Puy-en-Velay, France	
30	Win	26–3–1	Sylvain Chapelle	PTS	6	21 Oct 2017	Gymnase St. Exupéry, Blagnac, France	
29	Win	25–4–1	Samir Kasmi	MD	10	18 May 2017	Cirque d'Hiver, Paris, France	Won French super-featherweight title
28	Win	24–3–1	Giorgi Gachechiladze	TKO	4 (6)	8 Apr 2017	Gymnase Massot, Le Puy-en-Velay, France	
27	Win	23–3–1	Dame Seck	PTS	8	1 Apr 2017	Salle des Trois Provinces, Brive-la-Gaillarde, France	
26	Loss	22–3–1	Guillaume Frenois	PTS	12	10 Nov 2016	Halle Georges Carpentier, Paris, France	For vacant European super-featherweight title
25	Win	22–2–1	Maurycy Gojko	UD	8	14 May 2016	Salle de L'Amphithéatre, Rodez, France	
24	Win	21–2–1	Dame Seck	UD	10	29 Jan 2016	Salle Mory, Villeneuve-sur-Lot, France	Retained French super-featherweight title
23	Win	20–2–1	Alix Djavoiev	UD	6	14 Nov 2015	Salles des Sports, Auxi-le-Château, France	
22	Win	19–2–1	Sebastien Cornu	TKO	8 (10)	12 Jun 2015	Salle Mory, Villeneuve-sur-Lot, France	Retained French super-featherweight title
21	Win	18–2–1	Alex Bone	PTS	10	30 Jan 2015	Salle Pollyvalente des Ramiers, Blagnac, France	
20	Loss	17–2–1	Richard Commey	UD	10	13 Dec 2014	MusikTeatret, Albertslund, Denmark	
19	Win	17–1–1	Yoann Portailler	UD	10	6 Jun 2014	Salle Pollyvalente des Ramiers, Blagnac, France	Won French super-featherweight title
18	Win	16–1–1	Sebastien Cornu	PTS	8	15 Mar 2014	Salles des Trois Provinces, Brive-la-Gaillarde, France	
17	Loss	15–1–1	Samir Kasmi	UD	12	7 Dec 2013	Gymnase Georges Racine, Clichy, France	For vacant European Union super-featherweight title
16	Win	15–0–1	Sebastien Benito	PTS	8	25 May 2013	Salle Mory, Villeneuve-sur-Lot, France	
15	Win	14–0–1	Hermin Isava	TKO	6 (6)	23 Feb 2013	Mazagan Beach and Gold Ressort, El Jadida, Morocco	
14	Win	13–0–1	Maurycy Gojko	PTS	8	23 Nov 2012	Salle Pollyvalente des Ramiers, Blagnac, France	
13	Win	12–0–1	Brahim Bouizem	UD	8	15 Jun 2012	Halle Aux Grains, Toulouse, France	
12	Win	11–0–1	Andrey Kudryavtsev	UD	12	29 Apr 2012	Donbass Arena, Donetsk, Ukraine	Won vacant WBA International lightweight title
11	Win	10–0–1	Ruddy Encarnacion	UD	10	26 Jan 2012	Salle Pollyvalente des Ramiers, Blagnac, France	Retained WBC International Silver lightweight title
10	Win	9–0–1	Carel Sandon	RTD	9 (10), 3:00	8 Jul 2011	Piazza XX Settembre, Civitanova Marche, Italy	Won vacant WBC International Silver lightweight title
9	Win	8–0–1	Sezer Erunsal	PTS	6	27 May 2011	Salle Pollyvalente des Ramiers, Blagnac, France	
8	Win	7–0–1	Mehdi Bounakab	UD	4	7 May 2011	Le Dôme de Marseille, Marseille, France	
7	Win	6–0–1	Mehdi Boubekeur	PTS	6	30 Apr 2011	Pierrelaye, France	
6	Win	5–0–1	Mounir Chaib	TKO	3 (6)	25 Feb 2011	Salle Bellegrave, Pessac, France	
5	Win	4–0–1	Yohan Garanx	PTS	4	4 Dec 2010	Salle Jean Moulin, Bergerac, France	
4	Win	3–0–1	Vergile Degonzaga	PTS	6	26 Nov 2010	Gymnase du Port Marchand, Toulon, France	
3	Draw	2–0–1	Marvin Petit	PTS	6	6 Nov 2010	Salle C.S Europe, Élancourt, France	
2	Win	2–0	Christophe Guedes	PTS	4	12 Jun 2010	Gymnase Raymond Boisset, Cournon d'Auvergne, France	
1	Win	1–0	Jerry Cagniac	PTS	4	21 May 2010	Salle Pollyvalente des Ramiers, Blagnac, France	

Sporting positions
Regional boxing titles
Inaugural title	WBC International Silver lightweight champion 8 July 2011 – 2012	Vacant Title next held by Tommy Coyle
Vacant Title last held by Oscar Jesus Pereya	WBA International lightweight champion 29 April 2012 – November 2012	Vacant Title next held by Emmanuel Tagoe
Preceded by Yoann Portallier	French super-featherweight champion 6 June 2014 – November 2016	Vacant Title next held by Samir Kasmi
Preceded by Samir Kasmi	French super-featherweight champion 18 May 2017 – 2018	Vacant Title next held by Matthieu Lehot
Vacant Title last held by James Tennyson	European super-featherweight champion 2 February 2019 – present	Incumbent
