= Alex Dilmaghani =

English boxer

Personal information
- Born: 29 July 1991 (age 35) Redhill, Surrey, England
- Height: 5 ft 8 in (173 cm)
- Weight: Super-featherweight; Lightweight

Boxing career
- Stance: Southpaw

Boxing record
- Total fights: 25
- Wins: 20
- Win by KO: 7
- Losses: 3
- Draws: 1
- No contests: 1

Alex Dilmaghani (born 29 July 1991) is an English professional boxer. He challenged for the IBO super-featherweight title in 2019 and the European super-featherweight title in 2020.

== Professional career ==
Dilmaghani made his professional debut on 23 April 2009, scoring a four-round points decision (PTS) victory against Baz Carey at the Troxy in London.

He scored another four victories, one by stoppage, before suffering the first defeat of his career against Mickey Coveney on 18 June 2011, losing via PTS over four rounds at the York Hall in London.

After spending the first part of his career training in England, and an inability to secure fights in England,, he began training in Mexico with famed trainer Ignacio Beristáin in 2011 and from 2013 to 2016, sparring with world champion boxers Juan Manuel Márquez, Jhonny González, Juan Carlos Salgado, and Rey Vargas. From 2014 to 2018 Dilmaghani fought twelve times abroad, in Mexico and Canada, scoring eleven wins with six stoppages and one no contest.

After fighting abroad for several years, Dilmaghani signed with Mick Hennessy and made his ring return to the United Kingdom on 25 May 2019 winning via technical knockout (TKO) in round 8 against Martin Parlagi at the Victoria Warehouse in Manchester.

=== Dilmaghani vs. Francisco Fonseca ===
In his next fight he challenged for his first world title, albeit a minor one, against former two-time world title challenger Francisco Fonseca for the vacant IBO super-featherweight title. The bout was originally scheduled to take place on 28 September 2019, but on the night Fonseca fell ill before walking to the ring, forcing promoter Mick Hennessey to cancel the main event at the last minute. The bout was rescheduled and took place on 16 November at the York Hall. Both men engaged in the centre of the ring, trading punches, with neither one taking a step back for the first seven rounds. In the eighth, Dilmaghani's relentless pace and body punches seemed to be having an effect on Fonseca. After an accidental clash of heads in the ninth which resulted in Fonseca being knocked to the canvas and Dilmaghani receiving a cut above his left eye, Fonseca began gaining the upper hand. After the twelve rounds were complete the result was announced as a majority draw, with one judge scoring the bout 115–114 to Fonseca while the other two scored it 114–114.

The fight reached just under 2 million viewers on Channel 5 (British TV channel) national television.

=== Dilmaghani vs. Samir Ziani ===
Following the draw with Fonseca, Dilmaghani challenged European super-featherweight champion Samir Ziani on 5 September 2020 at the Production Park Studios in South Kirkby. The first round saw both men stand toe-to-toe from the opening bell, with Dilmaghani landing punches to the body while Ziani repeatedly landed with left hooks to the head. The pace continued in the second round with the champion able to land more punches. Dilmaghani tightened up his defence in the third while landing short left hooks. His success continued for much of the fourth, with Ziani coming on strong at the end of the round, landing a left hook as the bell rang. Dilmaghani began using footwork in the fifth while landing the occasional illegal elbow. He suffered a cut under his right eye in the sixth round and received a warning from referee Giuseppe Quartarone for his use of the elbow. Ziani found success in the seventh as he pressured Dilmaghani, who managed to regain control in the eighth. After an accidental clash of heads left the champion with a cut under his right eye, Dilmaghani was able to continue his success in the ninth round. The pace eased off in the tenth but picked back up in the eleventh as both men went toe-to-toe. Dilmaghani was thrown across the ring in the twelfth and final round after an onslaught of punches from Ziani, who continued the attack, staggering Dilmaghani with a three punch combination. Under pressure and with his back against the ropes he went down to the canvas, only for Quartarone to rule it a slip. Ziani kept up the pressure and knocked Dilmaghani into the ropes and back onto the canvas, with Quartarone again deciding not to issue a count. The champion began to land with more frequency, with a left hand knocking Dilmaghani to the canvas with 30 seconds of the fight remaining. After Quartarone ruled it a knockdown, issued a count and allowed Dilmaghani to continue, Ziani landed again to send Dilmaghani flying into the ropes and back to the canvas. He again made it to his feet, but Quartarone decided enough was enough and called a halt to the contest with just nine seconds before the final bell, handing Dilmaghani a twelfth-round TKO loss and the second defeat of his career.

== Personal life ==
Dilmaghani has a law degree from Southampton University.

== Professional boxing record ==
24 fights	20 wins	2 losses
By knockout	7	1
By decision	13	1
Draws	1	
No contests	1	

No.	Result	Record	Opponent	Type	Round, time	Date	Location	Notes
24	Win	20–2–1 (1)	Michal Dufek	UD	6	27 Jan 2023	Salle du Casino, Aix-les-Bains, France	
23	Win	19–2–1 (1)	Victor Julio	UD	8	9 April 2022	Gråkjær Arena, Holstebro, Denmark	
22	Loss	18–2–1 (1)	Samir Ziani	TKO	12 (12), 2:51	5 Sep 2020	Production Park Studios, South Kirkby, England	For European super-featherweight title
21	Draw	18–1–1 (1)	Francisco Fonseca	MD	12	16 Nov 2019	York Hall, London, England	For vacant IBO super-featherweight title
20	Win	18–1 (1)	Martin Parlagi	TKO	8 (10), 0:44	25 May 2019	Victoria Warehouse, Manchester, England	
19	Win	17–1 (1)	Cristian Arrazola	TKO	1 (8), 3:00	20 Oct 2018	Montreal Casino, Montreal, Quebec, Canada	
18	Win	16–1 (1)	Andy Almendras	RTD	4 (8), 3:00	10 Feb 2018	17 Steakhouse, Mississauga, Ontario, Canada	
17	Win	15–1 (1)	Tuomo Eronen	UD	8	11 Nov 2017	Powerade Centre, Brampton, Ontario, Canada	
16	Win	14–1 (1)	Ulises Perez Torres	TKO	6 (10), 1:01	21 Jul 2017	The Danforth Music Hall, Toronto, Ontario, Canada	
15	Win	13–1 (1)	Miguel Angel González	UD	8	20 Apr 2017	The Danforth Music Hall, Toronto, Ontario, Canada	
14	NC	12–1 (1)	Laramie Carmona	NC	1 (6), 1:01	4 Feb 2017	Deerfoot Inn & Casino, Calgary, Alberta, Canada	
13	Win	12–1	Cecilio Santos	UD	6	10 Dec 2016	Montreal Casino, Montreal, Quebec, Canada	
12	Win	11–1	Juan Miguel Beltran	KO	2 (6), 1:19	2 Dec 2016	Club de Veteranos, Sinaloa de Leyva, Mexico	
11	Win	10–1	Felipe Diaz	KO	2 (6), 1:55	30 Apr 2016	Agua Prieta, Mexico	
10	Win	9–1	Rafael Falcon Estrella	UD	10	28 Nov 2015	Matehuala, Mexico	
9	Win	8–1	Uriel Gonzalez	UD	4	23 Aug 2014	Convention Center Surman Villa de las Flores, Coacalco, Mexico	
8	Win	7–1	Kristian Laight	PTS	4	26 Oct 2013	Civic Hall, Trowbridge, England	
7	Win	6–1	Billy Smith	PTS	4	30 Nov 2012	Guildhall, Southampton, England	
6	Loss	5–1	Mickey Coveney	PTS	4	18 Jun 2011	York Hall, London, England	
5	Win	5–0	Johnny Greaves	PTS	4	16 Apr 2010	Robin Park Sports Centre, Wigan, England	
4	Win	4–0	Sergejs Rozakmens	TKO	4 (6), 1:15	18 Feb 2010	Midland Hotel, Manchester, England	
3	Win	3–0	Jason Nesbitt	PTS	4	13 Nov 2009	Fenton Manor Sports Complex, Stoke-on-Trent, England	
2	Win	2–0	Daniel Thorpe	PTS	4	21 Aug 2009	Manchester Velodrome, Manchester, England	
1	Win	1–0	Baz Carey	PTS	4	23 Apr 2009	Troxy, London, England	
