= Francisco Fonseca (boxer) =

Nicaraguan boxer (born 1994)

Personal information
- Nationality: Nicaraguan; Costa Rican
- Born: Francisco Hernan Fonseca Lira; 24 March 1994 (age 32) El Rama, Nicaragua
- Height: 5 ft 7 1/2 in (171 cm)
- Weight: Super featherweight; Lightweight

Boxing career
- Reach: 69 1/2 in (177 cm)
- Stance: Orthodox

Boxing record
- Total fights: 43
- Wins: 37
- Win by KO: 29
- Losses: 4
- Draws: 2

Francisco Hernan Fonseca Lira (born 24 March 1994) is a Nicaraguan professional boxer. He has challenged twice for the IBF super featherweight title in 2017 and 2018.

== Professional career ==
Fonseca turned professional in December 2013 in San Jose, Costa Rica. On his debut as a professional, Fonseca faced Eduardo Urbina. The match ended in a draw.

Fonseca fought on the undercard in a super featherweight bout with undefeated IBF champion Gervonta Davis on the 26 August 2017 mega fight between Floyd Mayweather Jr. and Conor McGregor. Davis failed to make weight, therefore the fight continued without the belt on the line for Davis. Fonseca lost the fight via eighth-round knockout, the first loss of his professional career.

On 15 December 2018, Fonseca made his second challenge for the IBF super featherweight title, now held by Tevin Farmer, on the undercard of Canelo Álvarez vs. Rocky Fielding. Fonseca was once against unsuccessful, losing by unanimous decision with all three judges scoring the bout 117–111 in favor of Farmer.

On 16 November 2019, Fonseca travelled to London, England to face Alex Dilmaghani for the vacant IBO super featherweight title. After the 12 rounds, the bout ended in a majority draw, meaning that neither fighter won the IBO title.

In his following fight, Fonseca faced undefeated prospect Ryan García at the Honda Center, California on 14 February 2020. Fonseca suffered the second knockout defeat of his career, after being knocked out by García in just 80 seconds of the first round.

== Professional boxing record ==
43 fights	37 wins	4 losses
By knockout	29	2
By decision	8	2
Draws	2	

No.	Result	Record	Opponent	Type	Round, time	Date	Location	Notes
43	Win	37–4–2	Sofiane Oumiha	UD	10	8 Aug 2025	Benina Martyrs Stadium, Benghazi, Libya	
42	Win	36–4–2	Erick Encinia	UD	8	12 Apr 2025	Polideportivo de Alajuela, Alajuela, Costa Rica	
41	Win	35–4–2	Jesus Bravo	TKO	4 (10), 1:50	1 Nov 2024	Camara de Ganaderos, Liberia, Costa Rica	
40	Win	34–4–2	Jezreel Corrales	TKO	4 (10), 2:51	20 Jul 2024	Estadio Ricardo Saprissa Aymá, San Juan de Tibás, Costa Rica	
39	Win	33–4–2	Jesus Bravo	TKO	4 (8), 0:57	23 Dec 2023	San José, Costa Rica	
38	Win	32–4–2	Norwin Gutierrez	KO	1 (6), 0:50	25 Jul 2023	Gym de Yoka, San José, Costa Rica	
37	Loss	31–4–2	Zhora Hamazaryan	UD	10	6 May 2023	KRK, Yekaterinburg, Russia	
36	Win	31–3–2	Billel Dib	TKO	2 (12), 2:55	9 Dec 2022	Whitlam Leisure Centre, Liverpool, Australia	Won vacant IBF International super featherweight title
35	Win	30–3–2	Andres Tapia	TKO	2 (10), 2:13	1 May 2022	Polideportivo Alexis Arguello, Managua, Nicaragua	Retained WBA Fedelatin super featherweight title
34	Win	29–3–2	Franco Gutierrez	KO	2 (10), 1:39	29 Jan 2022	Polideportivo Alexis Arguello, Managua, Nicaragua	Won vacant WBA Fedelatin super featherweight title
33	Win	28–3–2	Robin Zamora	KO	8 (11), 1:00	30 Apr 2021	Puerto Salvador Allende, Managua, Nicaragua	For vacant WBA Fedelatin super featherweight title
32	Win	27–3–2	Lesther Lara	KO	2 (8), 2:00	18 Sep 2020	Nuevo Gimnasio Nicarao, Managua, Nicaragua	
31	Win	26–3–2	Eusebio Osejo	KO	1 (8), 2:28	8 Aug 2020	Nuevo Gimnasio Nicarao, Managua, Nicaragua	
30	Loss	25–3–2	Ryan Garcia	KO	1 (12), 1:20	14 Feb 2020	Honda Center, Anaheim, California, US	For WBC Silver lightweight title
29	Draw	25–2–2	Alex Dilmaghani	MD	12	16 Nov 2019	York Hall, London, England	For vacant IBO super featherweight title
28	Win	25–2–1	David Bency	TKO	7 (8), 2:50	13 Jul 2019	Nuevo Gimnasio Nicarao, Managua, Nicaragua	
27	Win	24–2–1	Robin Zamora	RTD	5 (8), 3:00	16 Mar 2019	Centro Mil Colores, Managua, Nicaragua	
26	Win	23–2–1	Stanley Mendez	TKO	1 (10), 2:08	2 Feb 2019	BN Arena, Hatillo, Costa Rica	
25	Loss	22–2–1	Tevin Farmer	UD	12	15 Dec 2018	Madison Square Garden, New York City, New York US	For IBF super featherweight title
24	Win	22–1–1	Sandro Hernandez	TKO	5 (10), 1:50	23 Aug 2018	Fantastic Casino de Albrook Mall, Panama City, Panama	Retained WBO Latino super featherweight title
23	Win	21–1–1	Daniel Miranda	TKO	5 (12), 2:18	14 Dec 2017	Fantastic Casino de Albrook Mall, Panama City, Panama	Won vacant WBO Latino super featherweight title
22	Win	20–1–1	Joel Blanco	TKO	3 (6), 1:45	24 Oct 2017	Fantastic Casino de Albrook Mall, Panama City, Panama	
21	Loss	19–1–1	Gervonta Davis	KO	8 (12), 0:39	26 Aug 2017	T-Mobile Arena, Paradise, Nevada, US	For vacant IBF super featherweight title
20	Win	19–0–1	Eliecer Lanzas	KO	3	31 Mar 2017	Parque Central, San Jose, Costa Rica	
19	Win	18–0–1	Miguel Corea	KO	3	14 Oct 2016	Gimnasio Shidokan Fitness, San Jose, Costa Rica	
18	Win	17–0–1	Luis Gonzalez	KO	4	19 Aug 2016	Gimnasio Shidokan Fitness, San Jose, Costa Rica	
17	Win	16–0–1	Azael Gonzalez	RTD	5	28 May 2016	Gimnasio Shidokan Fitness, San Jose, Costa Rica	
16	Win	15–0–1	Eliecer Lanzas	TKO	8	16 Apr 2016	Gimnasio Guy Rouck Chavez, Matagalpa, Nicaragua	
15	Win	14–0–1	Marcio Soza	UD	8	15 Jan 2016	San Salvador, El Salvador	
14	Win	13–0–1	Moises Castro	KO	4	19 Dec 2015	San Jose, Costa Rica	
13	Win	12–0–1	Jorge Luis Munguia	KO	6	28 Nov 2015	Alajuela, Costa Rica	
12	Win	11–0–1	Edwin Tellez	KO	2	17 Oct 2015	Liberia, Costa Rica	
11	Win	10–0–1	Danny Erazo	UD	6	1 Aug 2015	Alajuela, Costa Rica	
10	Win	9–0–1	Carlos Rivas	UD	6	13 Jun 2015	Alajuela, Costa Rica	
9	Win	8–0–1	Lenin Tellez	KO	2	18 Apr 2015	Alajuela, Costa Rica	
8	Win	7–0–1	Carlos Rivas	UD	6	14 Mar 2015	Alajuela, Costa Rica	
7	Win	6–0–1	Carlos Aguilera	TKO	6	28 Feb 2015	Alajuela, Costa Rica	
6	Win	5–0–1	Carlos Aguilera	UD	4	18 Oct 2014	Alajuela, Costa Rica	
5	Win	4–0–1	Julio Delgado	TKO	2	26 Jul 2014	Alajuela, Costa Rica	
4	Win	3–0–1	Eduardo Urbina	TKO	2	14 Jun 2014	Alajuela, Costa Rica	
3	Win	2–0–1	Brayan Suazo	KO	3	9 Mar 2014	San Jose, Costa Rica	
2	Win	1–0–1	Reyner Araya	KO	1	26 Jan 2014	San Jose, Costa Rica	
1	Draw	0–0–1	Eduardo Urbina	MD	4	21 Dec 2013	San Jose, Costa Rica	
