= 2017 in combat sports =

== Amateur boxing ==
- April 30 – May 7: 2017 Asian Amateur Boxing Championships in Tashkent
  - Uzbekistan won both the gold and overall medal tallies.
- June 10 – 18: 2017 AMBC Elite American Confederation Boxing Championships in (Honduras) Tegucigalpa
  - Cuba won the gold and overall medal tallies.
- June 16 – 24: 2017 European Amateur Boxing Championships (Men) in Kharkiv
  - Ukraine won the gold medal tally. England won the overall medal tally.
- June 17 – 25: 2017 AFBC Elite African Confederation Boxing Championships in (Republic of the Congo) Brazzaville
  - Note: This event was supposed to be held on May 27 to June 4.
  - Cameroon won the gold medal tally. Algeria won the overall medal tally.
- June 26 – 29: 2017 OCBC Elite Oceanian Confederation Boxing Championships (Men) in Gold Coast, Queensland
  - Australia won both the gold and overall medal tallies.
- August 4 – 13: 2017 Women's European Amateur Boxing Championships in Cascia
  - Turkey won the gold medal tally. Italy won the overall medal tally.
- August 25 – September 3: 2017 AIBA World Boxing Championships in (Germany) Hamburg
  - Cuba won both the gold and overall medal tallies.
- November 19 – 26: 2017 AIBA Women's Junior & Youth World Championships in Guwahati
  - India won both the gold and overall medal tallies.

== Fencing ==
=== World fencing events ===
- April 1 – 10: 2017 World Junior and Cadet Fencing Championships in (Bulgaria) Plovdiv
  - Russia won both the gold and overall medal tallies.
- July 19 – 26: 2017 World Fencing Championships in (Germany) Leipzig
  - Italy won both the gold and overall medal tallies.

=== Continental fencing events ===
- February 24 – March 5: 2017 Asian Junior and Cadet Fencing Championships in (Thailand) Bangkok
  - Junior: South Korea won the gold medal tally. Japan won the overall medal tally.
  - Cadet: Hong Kong won both the gold and overall medal tallies.
- February 27 – March 5: 2017 Pan American Junior and Cadet Fencing Championships in (Cuba) Havana
  - Junior: The United States won both the gold and overall medal tallies.
  - Cadet: United States
- February 28 – March 9: 2017 European Junior and Cadet Fencing Championships in (Bulgaria) Plovdiv
  - Junior: Russia won the gold medal tally. Russia and Italy won 12 overall medals each.
  - Cadet: Italy
- March 7 – 12: 2017 African Junior Fencing Championships in (Ivory Coast) Yamoussoukro
  - Tunisia won both the gold and overall medal tallies.
- June 8 – 12: 2017 African Fencing Championships in Cairo
  - Egypt won both the gold and overall medal tallies.
- June 12 – 17: 2017 European Fencing Championships in (Georgia (country)) Tbilisi
  - Italy won both the gold and overall medal tallies.
- June 13 – 18: 2017 Pan American Fencing Championships in (Canada) Montreal
  - The United States won both the gold and overall medal tallies.
- June 15 – 20: 2017 Asian Fencing Championships in Hong Kong
  - South Korea won both the gold and overall medal tallies.

=== 2016–17 Fencing Grand Prix ===
- Épée Grand Prix
  - December 9 – 11, 2016: Qatari Grand Prix in (Qatar) Doha
    - Winners: (South Korea) KWEON Young-jun (m) / (Tunisia) Sarra Besbes (f)
  - March 24 – 26: Hungarian Grand Prix in (Hungary) Budapest
    - Winners: (South Korea) Jung Jin-sun (m) / (Italy) Rossella Fiamingo (f)
  - May 26 – 28: Colombian Grand Prix in (Colombia) Bogotá
    - Winners: (Ukraine) Bohdan Nikishyn (m) / (Hungary) Emese Szász (f)
- Foil Grand Prix
  - December 2 – 4, 2016: Italian Grand Prix in (Italy) Turin
    - Winners: (Italy) Alessio Foconi (m) / (United States) Lee Kiefer (f)
  - March 18 & 19: American Grand Prix in (United States) Long Beach, California
    - Winners: (Russia) Timur Safin (m) / (United States) Lee Kiefer (f)
  - May 19 – 21: Chinese Grand Prix in (China) Shanghai
    - Winners: (United Kingdom) Richard Kruse (m) / (Italy) Martina Batini (f)
- Sabre Grand Prix
  - December 16 – 18, 2016: Mexican Grand Prix in (Mexico) Cancún
    - Winners: (Italy) Luigi Samele (m) / (Russia) Yana Egorian (f)
  - March 31 & April 1: Korean Grand Prix in (South Korea) Seoul
    - Winners: (South Korea) Kim Jung-hwan (m) / (Russia) Yana Egorian (f)
  - June 2 – 4: Russian Grand Prix in (Russia) Moscow
    - Winners: (Italy) Luca Curatoli (m) / (France) Charlotte Lembach (f)

=== 2016–17 Fencing World Cup ===
- Men's Épée World Cup
  - October 28 – 30, 2016: Swiss World Cup in (Switzerland) Bern
    - Winner: (Russia) Nikita Glazkov
    - Team winners: France
  - November 18 – 20, 2016: Argentinian World Cup in (Argentina) Buenos Aires
    - Winner: (South Korea) Park Sang-young
    - Team winners: Russia
  - January 26 – 28: German Épée World Cup in (Germany) Heidenheim an der Brenz
    - Winner: (South Korea) Park Kyoung-doo
    - Team winners: Italy
  - February 17 – 19: Canadian World Cup in (Canada) Vancouver
    - Winner: (Switzerland) Max Heinzer
    - Team winners: The Czech Republic
  - May 12 – 14: French Épée World Cup (final) in (France) Paris
    - Winner: (Italy) Marco Fichera
    - Team winners: South Korea
- Women's Épée World Cup
  - October 21 – 23, 2016: Estonian World Cup in Tallinn
    - Winner: (Russia) Tatiana Logunova
    - Team winners: Estonia
  - November 11 – 13, 2016: Chinese Épée World Cup in (China) Suzhou
    - Winner: (United States) Anna van Brummen
    - Team winners: Ukraine
  - January 20 – 22: Spanish Épée World Cup in (Spain) Barcelona
    - Winner: (China) Sun Yiwen
    - Team winners: China
  - February 10 – 12: Italian Épée World Cup in (Italy) Legnano
    - Winner: (Estonia) Julia Beljajeva
    - Team winners: China
  - May 5 – 7: Brazilian World Cup (final) in (Brazil) Rio de Janeiro
    - Winner: (Estonia) Kristina Kuusk
    - Team winners: Italy
- Men's Foil World Cup
  - October 21 – 23, 2016: Egyptian World Cup in (Egypt) Cairo
    - Winner: (United States) Race Imboden
    - Team winners: France
  - November 11 – 13, 2016: Japanese World Cup in (Japan) Tokyo
    - Winner: (United States) Miles Chamley-Watson
    - Team winners: Russia
  - January 20 – 22: French Men's Foil World Cup in (France) Paris
    - Winner: (United States) Alexander Massialas
    - Team winners: Italy
  - February 10 – 12: German Men's Foil World Cup in (Germany) Bonn
    - Winner: (Germany) Peter Joppich
    - Team winners: France
  - May 5 – 7: Russian World Cup (final) in (Russia) Saint Petersburg
    - Winner: (Italy) Daniele Garozzo
    - Team winners: France
- Women's Foil World Cup
  - October 14 – 16, 2016: Mexican World Cup in (Mexico) Cancún
    - Winner: (Italy) Arianna Errigo
    - Team winners: Italy
  - November 4 – 6, 2016: French Women's Foil World Cup in (France) Saint-Maur-des-Fossés
    - Winner: (Russia) Inna Deriglazova
    - Team winners: Italy
  - January 13 – 15: Algerian World Cup in (Algeria) Algiers
    - Winner: (France) Ysaora Thibus
    - Team winners: Italy
  - February 3 – 5: Polish Foil World Cup in (Poland) Gdańsk
    - Winner: (Russia) Svetlana Tripapina
    - Team winners: Italy
  - April 28 – 30: German Women's Foil World Cup (final) in (Germany) Tauberbischofsheim
    - Winner: (United States) Lee Kiefer
    - Team winners: Italy
- Men's Sabre World Cup
  - November 4 – 6, 2016: Senegalese World Cup in (Senegal) Dakar
    - Winner: (France) Vincent Anstett
    - Team winners: Iran
  - December 2 – 4, 2016: Hungarian World Cup in (Hungary) Győr
    - Winner: (South Korea) OH San-guk
    - Team winners: Italy
  - February 3 – 5: Italian Sabre World Cup in (Italy) Padua
    - Winner: (Hungary) András Szatmári
    - Team winners: South Korea
  - February 24 – 26: Polish Sabre World Cup in (Poland) Warsaw
    - Winner: (South Korea) Kim Jung-hwan
    - Team winners: Romania
  - May 19 – 21: Spanish Sabre World Cup (final) in (Spain) Madrid
    - Winner: (Germany) Max Hartung
    - Team winners: Italy
- Women's Sabre World Cup
  - November 18 – 20, 2016: French Sabre World Cup in (France) Orléans
    - Winner: (France) Manon Brunet
    - Team winners: Italy
  - January 27 – 29: American World Cup in (United States) New York City
    - Winner: (France) Cécilia Berder
    - Team winners: France
  - February 17 – 19: Greek World Cup in (Greece) Athens
    - Winner: (Hungary) Anna Márton
    - Team winners: Russia
  - March 24 – 26: Chinese Sabre World Cup in (China) Beijing
    - Winner: (France) Manon Brunet
    - Team winners: The United States
  - May 12 – 14: Tunisian World Cup (final) in (Tunisia) Tunis
    - Winner: (Ukraine) Olha Kharlan
    - Team winners: Italy

== Judo ==
=== International judo events ===
- April 14 – 16: 2017 African Judo Championships in (Madagascar) Antananarivo
  - Algeria won both the gold and overall medal tallies.
- April 20 – 23: 2017 European Judo Championships in (Poland) Warsaw
  - Russia, France, Ukraine, and Azerbaijan won 2 gold medals each. Russia won the overall medal tally.
- April 28: 2017 Oceania Judo Championships in (Tonga) Nuku'alofa
  - Australia won both the gold and overall medal tallies.
- April 28 – 30: 2017 Pan American Judo Championships in Panama City
  - Brazil won both the gold and overall medal tallies.
- May 6 & 7: 2017 Kata European Judo Championships in Pembroke, Malta
  - France won both the gold and overall medal tallies.
- May 26 – 28: 2017 Asian Judo Championships in Hong Kong
  - Japan won the gold medal tally. South Korea won the overall medal tally.
- June 15 & 16: 2017 Veteran European Judo Championships in (Croatia) Zagreb
  - France won both the gold and overall medal tallies.
- June 30 – July 2: 2017 Cadet European Judo Championships in (Lithuania) Kaunas
  - Russia and Georgia won 3 gold medals each. Russia won the overall medal tally.
- August 9 – 13: 2017 World Cadets Judo Championships in (Chile) Santiago
  - Japan won both the gold and overall medal tallies.
- August 28 – September 3: 2017 World Judo Championships in (Hungary) Budapest
  - Japan won both the gold and overall medal tallies.
- September 3: World Senior Championship Teams 2017 Championships in (Hungary) Budapest
  - Japan won all the gold medals. Japan and Brazil won 6 overall medals each.
- September 15 – 17: 2017 Junior European Judo Championships in (Slovenia) Maribor
  - Individual: Russia, Azerbaijan, France, and the Netherlands won 3 gold medals each. Russia won the overall medal tally.
  - Team: Azerbaijan (m) / France (f)
- October 18 – 21: 2017 World Junior Judo Championships in (Croatia) Zagreb
  - Note: This event was supposed to be hosted in Pyongyang, but the IJF took it away, due to the ongoing tensions in the region.
  - Japan won both the gold and overall medal tallies.
- November 10 – 12: 2017 U23 European Judo Championships in (Montenegro) Podgorica
  - Russia won both the gold and overall medal tallies.
- November 11 & 12: 2017 Oceania Open in Port Vila
  - Vanuatu won both the gold and overall medal tallies.
- November 11 & 12: 2017 World Open Judo Championships in (Morocco) Marrakesh
  - Winners: (France) Teddy Riner (m) / (Japan) Sarah Asahina (f)
- November 25: 2017 European Club Championships - Golden League in (Turkey) Ankara
  - Winners: (Russia) Team Yewara Neva (m) / (Russia) Team Yewara Neva (f)
- November 25 & 26: 2017 European Club Championships - Europa League in (Germany) Wuppertal
  - Winners: (Russia) Team Edelweiss (m) / (France) Team Flam 91 (f)

=== Judo Grand Slam ===
- February 11 & 12: Grand Slam #1 in (France) Paris
  - Japan won both the gold and overall medal tallies.
- March 10 – 12: Grand Slam #2 in Baku
  - The Netherlands won the gold medal tally. Azerbaijan won the overall medal tally.
- May 19 – 21: Grand Slam #3 in Yekaterinburg
  - Japan won the gold medal tally. Russia won the overall medal tally.
- October 27 – 29: Grand Slam #4 in (United Arab Emirates) Abu Dhabi
  - Russia won both the gold and overall medal tallies.
- December 1 – 3: Grand Slam #5 (final) in Tokyo
  - Japan won both the gold and overall medal tallies.

=== Judo Grand Prix ===
- February 24 – 26: Grand Prix #1 in (Germany) Düsseldorf
  - Japan won both the gold and overall medal tallies.
- March 31 – April 2: Grand Prix #2 in (Georgia (country)) Tbilisi
  - Brazil, Russia, and Georgia won 3 gold medals each. Brazil and Russia won 10 overall medals each.
- April 7 – 9: Grand Prix #3 in (Turkey) Antalya
  - Russia won both the gold and overall medal tallies.
- June 16 – 18: Grand Prix #4 in (Mexico) Cancún
  - Brazil won the gold medal tally. Great Britain won the overall medal tally.
- June 30 – July 2: Grand Prix #5 in (China) Hohhot
  - Japan won the gold medal tally. Russia won the overall medal tally.
- September 29 – October 1: Grand Prix #6 in (Croatia) Zagreb
  - Japan won both the gold and overall medal tallies.
- October 6 – 8: Grand Prix #7 in Tashkent
  - Israel won the gold medal tally. Uzbekistan won the overall medal tally.
- November 17 – 19: Grand Prix #8 (final) in The Hague
  - The Netherlands won both the gold and overall medal tallies.

=== Judo Union of Asia (JUA) ===
- July 8 & 9: Asia Open #1 in Taipei
  - South Korea won the gold medal tally. Chinese Taipei won the overall medal tally.
- December 9 & 10: Asia Open #2 (final) in Hong Kong
  - Japan won both the gold and overall medal tallies.

=== European Judo Union (EJU) ===
- January 9 – November 5: 2017 EJU Open and Cup events

==== EJU Open ====
- February 4 & 5: EJU Open #1 in (Bulgaria) Sofia (women only)
  - Japan won both the gold and overall medal tallies.
- February 4 & 5: EJU Open #2 in (Portugal) Odivelas (men only)
  - France and Russia won 2 gold medals each. France won the overall medal tally.
- February 18 & 19: EJU Open #3 in (Austria) Oberwart (women only)
  - Japan won both the gold and overall medal tallies.
- February 18 & 19: EJU Open #4 in (Italy) Rome (men only)
  - Japan won both the gold and overall medal tallies.
- March 4 & 5: EJU Open #5 in (Czech Republic) Prague (women only)
  - The Netherlands and Brazil won 2 gold medals each. Germany won the overall medal tally.
- March 4 & 5: EJU Open #6 in Katowice (men only)
  - Poland won both the gold and overall medal tallies.
- June 3 & 4: EJU Open #7 in (Romania) Bucharest
  - France won the gold medal tally. France and Italy won 9 overall medals each.
- July 22 & 23: EJU Open #8 in Minsk
  - Belarus won the gold medal tally. Belarus and Russia won 6 overall medals each.
- September 23 & 24: EJU Open #9 (final) in (Serbia) Belgrade
  - Israel and Romania won 3 gold medals each. France won the overall medal tally.

==== EJU Cup ====
- March 11 & 12: EJU Cup #1 in (Switzerland) Uster
  - Italy won both the gold and overall medal tallies.
- April 1 & 2: EJU Cup #2 in (Croatia) Dubrovnik
  - France won both the gold and overall medal tallies.
- April 29 & 30: EJU Cup #3 in Sarajevo
  - France, Croatia, Slovenia, and Bosnia and Herzegovina won 2 gold medals each. France won the overall medal tally.
- May 13 & 14: EJU Cup #4 in Orenburg
  - Russia won both the gold and overall medal tallies.
- June 17 & 18: EJU Cup #5 in (Slovenia) Celje–Podčetrtek
  - Germany won the gold medal tally. Germany, Russia, and France won 12 overall medals each.
- July 15 & 16: EJU Cup #6 in (Germany) Saarbrücken
  - The Netherlands won the gold medal tally. Russia won the overall medal tally..
- September 9 & 10: EJU Cup #7 in (Slovakia) Bratislava
  - Slovenia won the gold medal tally. Italy won the overall medal tally.
- October 28 & 29: EJU Cup #8 (final) in (Spain) Málaga
  - France won both the gold and overall medal tallies.

=== African Judo Union (AJU) ===
- January 14 & 15: AJU Open #1 in (Tunisia) Tunis
  - France won both the gold and overall medal tallies.
- March 18 & 19: AJU Open #2 in (Morocco) Casablanca
  - France won both the gold and overall medal tallies.
- November 18 & 19: AJU Open #3 in Dakar
  - Argentina won the gold medal tally. Senegal won the overall medal tally.
- November 25 & 26: AJU Open #4 (final) in Yaoundé
  - Cameroon won both the gold and overall medal tallies.

=== Pan American Judo Confederation (CPJ) ===
- March 11 & 12: CPJ Open #1 in Buenos Aires
  - Argentina and the United States won 5 gold medals each. Argentina won the overall medal tally.
- March 18 & 19: CPJ Open #2 in (Chile) Santiago
  - Brazil won both the gold and overall medal tallies.
- March 25 & 26: CPJ Open #3 in (Peru) Lima
  - Brazil won both the gold and overall medal tallies.
- October 7 & 8: CPJ #4 (final) in Santo Domingo
  - The Dominican Republic won both the gold and overall medal tallies.

== Karate ==
=== International karate events ===
- June 26 – July 2: 2017 Karate 1–Youth World Cup in (Croatia) Umag
  - Italy won both the gold and overall medal tallies.
- September 16 & 17: 2017 Mediterranean Junior & Cadet and U21 Karate Championships in (Morocco) Tangier
  - Egypt won both the gold and overall medal tallies.
- October 26 – 29: 2017 World U21, Junior, and Cadet Karate Championships in (Spain) Tenerife
  - Japan won both the gold and overall medal tallies.

=== 2017 Karate 1-Series A ===
- June 17 & 18: K1-SA #1 in Toledo
  - Spain won both the gold and overall medal tallies.
- September 23 & 24: K1-SA #2 in (Turkey) Istanbul
  - Iran won the gold medal tally. Iran and Japan won 12 overall medals each.
- October 7 & 8: K1-SA #3 in (Austria) Salzburg
  - Japan and France won 3 gold medals each. Japan won the overall medal tally.
- November 25 & 26: K1-SA #4 (final) in Okinawa
  - Japan won both the gold and overall medal tallies.

=== 2017 Karate 1–Premier League ===
- January 27 – 29: K1-PL #1 in (France) Paris
  - Japan won both the gold and overall medal tallies.
- March 17 – 19: K1-PL #2 in (Netherlands) Rotterdam
  - France and Japan won 4 gold medals each. France won the overall medal tally.
- March 31 – April 2: K1-PL #3 in (United Arab Emirates) Dubai
  - Iran won the gold medal tally. Turkey won the overall medal tally.
- April 14 – 16: K1-PL #4 in Rabat
  - Egypt won the gold medal tally. Morocco won the overall medal tally.
- September 8 – 10: K1-PL #5 (final) in (Germany) Leipzig
  - Japan won both the gold and overall medal tallies.

=== Asian Karatedo Federation (AKF) ===
- July 13 – 15: 2017 AKF Cadet, Junior & U-21 Championships in (Kazakhstan) Astana
  - Iran won both the gold and overall medal tallies.
- July 15 – 17: 2017 Asian Karate Championships in (Kazakhstan) Astana
  - Japan won both the gold and overall medal tallies.

=== European Karate Federation (EKF) ===
- February 17 – 19: 2017 EKF Junior & Cadet and U21 Karate Championships in (Bulgaria) Sofia
  - France and Italy won 6 gold medals each. Spain won the overall medal tally.
- May 4 – 7: 2017 EKF Senior Karate Championships in Kocaeli
  - Turkey won both the gold and overall medal tallies.
- June 3 & 4: 2017 EKF Karate Championships For Regions in (Kosovo) Pristina
  - Turkey won both the gold and overall medal tallies.

=== Panamerican Karate Federation (PKF) ===
- May 23 – 27: 2017 PKF Senior Karate Championships in Curaçao
  - Brazil won the gold medal tally. The United States won the overall medal tally.
- August 24 – 26: 2017 Pan American Junior, Cadet, & U21 Karate Championships in (Argentina) Buenos Aires
  - Brazil won both the gold and overall medal tallies.

=== African Karate Federation (UFAK) ===
- May 29 – June 5: 2017 UFAK Senior Karate Championships in Yaoundé
  - Tunisia won the gold medal tally. Cameroon won the overall medal tally.

=== Oceania Karate Federation (OKF) ===
- April 7 – 9: 2017 Oceania Karate Championships in Liverpool, New South Wales (Sydney)
  - Australia won both the gold and overall medal tallies.

== Kickboxing ==
=== International and Continental events ===
- April 24 – 30: 2017 WAKO Asian Kickboxing Championships in Ashgabat
  - Turkmenistan won both the gold and overall medal tallies.
- June 16 – 18: 2017 Bolivarian Kickboxing Championships in Santo Domingo
  - Peru won the gold medal tally. Ecuador won the overall medal tally.
- September 2 – 10: 2017 WAKO Cadets and Juniors European Championships in (North Macedonia) Skopje
  - Russia won both the gold and overall medal tallies.
- September 28 – October 1: 2017 Central American and Caribbean Region Championships in (Trinidad and Tobago) Port of Spain
  - Event postponed.
- November 4 – 12: 2017 WAKO Senior World Championships (All disciplines) in (Hungary) Budapest
  - Russia won both the gold and overall medal tallies.
- November 30 – December 3: 2017 South American Kickboxing Championships in Foz do Iguaçu
  - Brazil won both the gold and overall medal tallies.

=== Open ===
- February 17 – 19: Kickboxing Finnish Open 2017 in Järvenpää
  - Finland won both the gold and overall medal tallies.
- February 24 – 26: Slovak Open 2017 in (Slovakia) Bratislava
  - Hungary won both the gold and overall medal tallies.
- March 17 – 19: German Open 2017 in Munich
  - Germany won both the gold and overall medal tallies.
- March 24 – 26: Latvia Open 2017 in Riga
- April 6 – 9: Turkish Open 2017 in Antalya
  - Turkey won both the gold and overall medal tallies.
- April 7 & 8: Yokoso Dutch Open in Amsterdam
  - The Netherlands won both the gold and overall medal tallies.
- April 8: Bihac Open in Bosnia and Herzegovina
- May 5 & 6: Balkan Open in (Bosnia and Herzegovina) Tešanj
- May 27: Alpe Adria Open 2017 in (Croatia) Pula
- October 13 & 14: Czech Open for Tatami Sports in (Czech Republic) Prague
- October 13 & 14: Scandinavian Open 2017 in (Norway) Oslo
- November 25: Slovenia Open 2017 in Zagorje ob Savi
- December 8 – 10: Vilnius Open Championship in Lithuania

=== WAKO World Cup ===
- March 3 – 5: 2017 Irish Open International (WAKO World Cup) in (Republic of Ireland) Dublin
  - Great Britain won both the gold and overall medal tallies.
- April 20 – 23: 2017 The Austrian Classics (WAKO World Cup) in (Austria) Innsbruck
  - Italy won both the gold and overall medals tallies.
- May 18 – 21: Hungary World Cup (WAKO World Cup) in Budapest
  - Hungary won both the gold and overall medal tallies.
- June 16 – 18: Bestfighter (WAKO World Cup ) in Rimini
  - Italy won both the gold and overall medal tallies.
- September 19 – 24: Diamond World Cup (WAKO World Cup) in Anapa
  - Russia won both the gold and overall medal tallies.

=== WAKO Europe Cup ===
- January 21 & 22: Golden Glove 2017 in Treviso
  - Italy won both the gold and overall medal tallies.
- February 10 – 12: Karlovac Open 2017 in Croatia
  - Hungary won both the gold and overall medal tallies.
- September 27 – 30: WAKO K1 European Cup 2017 in Prague
  - The Czech Republic won both the gold and overall medal tallies.
- November 30 – December 3: 2017 WAKO European Cup in (Poland) Nowy Sącz
  - Event cancelled.

== Mixed martial arts ==
=== Ultimate Fighting Championship ===
- January 13 – 15: UFC Fight Night: Rodríguez vs. Penn in (United States) Phoenix, Arizona
  - (Mexico) Yair Rodríguez def. (United States) B.J. Penn from TKO (front kick and punches) in round 2.
  - (United States) Joe Lauzon def. (Poland) Marcin Held from Decision (split) (27–30, 29–28, 29–28) in round 3.
  - (United States) Ben Saunders def. (United States) Court McGee from Decision (unanimous) (29-28, 29-28, 29-28) in round 3.
  - (United States) Sergio Pettis def. (United States) John Moraga from Decision (unanimous) (29-28, 29-28, 30-27) in round 3.
- January 27 – 29: UFC on Fox: Shevchenko vs. Peña in (United States) Denver
  - (Kyrgyzstan) Valentina Shevchenko def. (United States) Julianna Peña from Submission (armbar) in round 2.
  - (United States) Jorge Masvidal def. (United States) Donald Cerrone from TKO (punches) in round 2.
  - (France) Francis Ngannou def. (Belarus) Andrei Arlovski from TKO (punches) in round 1.
  - (United States) Jason Knight def. (United States) Alex Caceres from Submission (rear-naked choke) in round 2.
- February 3 – 5: UFC Fight Night: Bermudez vs. Korean Zombie in (United States) Houston
  - (South Korea) Chan Sung Jung def. (United States) Dennis Bermudez from KO (punch) in round 1.
  - (United States) Felice Herrig def. (Mexico) Alexa Grasso from Decision (unanimous) (29-28, 29-28, 30-27) in round 3.
  - (United States) James Vick def. (United States) Abel Trujillo from Submission (D'Arce choke) in round 3.
  - (Switzerland) Volkan Oezdemir def. (United States) Ovince Saint Preux from Decision (split) (29-28, 28-29, 29-28) in round 3.
  - (United States) Marcel Fortuna def. (United States) Anthony Hamilton from KO (punch) in round 1.
  - (Brazil) Jéssica Andrade def. (United States) Angela Hill from Decision (unanimous) (30-27, 30-27, 30-27) in round 3.
- February 10 – 12: UFC 208 in (United States) Brooklyn
  - (Netherlands) Germaine de Randamie defeated (United States) Holly Holm from Decision (unanimous) (48-47, 48-47, 48-47) in round 5.
  - (Brazil) Anderson Silva defeated (United States) Derek Brunson from Decision (unanimous) (29-28, 29-28, 30-27) in round 3.
  - (Brazil) Ronaldo Souza defeated (United States) Tim Boetsch from Submission (kimura) in round 1.
  - (Brazil) Glover Teixeira defeated (United States) Jared Cannonier from Decision (unanimous) (30-26, 30-26, 30-26) in round 3.
  - (United States) Dustin Poirier defeated (United States) Jim Miller from Decision (majority) (28-28, 30-27, 29-28) in round 3.
- February 17 – 19: UFC Fight Night: Lewis vs. Browne in (Canada) Halifax, Nova Scotia
  - (United States) Derrick Lewis defeated (United States) Travis Browne from KO (punches) in round 2.
  - (United States) Johny Hendricks defeated (Australia) Hector Lombard from Decision (unanimous) (30-27, 30-27, 29-28) in round 3.
  - (Canada) Gavin Tucker defeated (United States) Sam Sicilia from Decision (unanimous) (30-27, 30-27, 30-27) in round 3.
  - (Canada) Elias Theodorou defeated (Brazil) Cezar Ferreira from Decision (unanimous) (30-27, 29-28, 29-28) in round 3.
  - (United States) Sara McMann defeated (United States) Gina Mazany from Submission (arm-triangle choke) in round 1.
  - (United States) Paul Felder defeated (Canada) Alessandro Ricci from TKO (elbow and punches) in round 1.
- March 3 – 5: UFC 209 in (United States) Paradise, Nevada
  - (United States) Tyron Woodley defeated (United States) Stephen Thompson from Decision (majority) (48-47, 47-47, 48-47) in round 5.
  - (Sweden) David Teymur defeated (United States) Lando Vannata from Decision (unanimous) (30-27, 30-27, 30-27) in round 3.
  - (Australia) Dan Kelly defeated (United States) Rashad Evans from Decision (split) (29-28, 28-29, 29-28) in round 3.
  - (United States) Cynthia Calvillo defeated (United States) Amanda Cooper from Submission (rear-naked choke) in round 1.
  - (United Kingdom) Alistair Overeem defeated (New Zealand) Mark Hunt from KO (knees) in round 3.
- March 10 – 12: UFC Fight Night: Belfort vs. Gastelum in (Brazil) Fortaleza
  - (United States) Kelvin Gastelum defeated (Brazil) Vitor Belfort from TKO (punches) in round 1.
  - (Brazil) Maurício Rua defeated (United States) Gian Villante from TKO (punches) in round 3.
  - (Brazil) Edson Barboza defeated (United States) Beneil Dariush from KO (flying knee) in round 2.
  - (United States) Ray Borg defeated (Brazil) Jussier Formiga from Decision (unanimous) (29-28, 29-28, 29-28) in round 3.
  - (United States) Marion Reneau vs. (Brazil) Bethe Correia; Result: Draw (majority) (29-27, 28-28, 28-28) in round 3.
  - (Brazil) Alex Oliveira defeated (United States) Tim Means from Submission (rear-naked choke) in round 2.
- March 17 – 19: UFC Fight Night: Manuwa vs. Anderson in (England) London
  - (United Kingdom) Jimi Manuwa defeated (United States) Corey Anderson from KO (punch) in round 1.
  - (Iceland) Gunnar Nelson defeated (United States) Alan Jouban from Submission (guillotine choke) in round 2.
  - (Ecuador) Marlon Vera defeated (United Kingdom) Brad Pickett from TKO (head kick and punches) in round 3.
  - (United Kingdom) Arnold Allen defeated (Finland) Makwan Amirkhani from Decision (split) (28–29, 30–27, 30–27) in round 3.
- April 7 – 9: UFC 210 in (United States) Buffalo, New York
  - (United States) Daniel Cormier defeated (United States) Anthony Johnson from Submission (rear-naked choke) in round 2.
  - (Netherlands) Gegard Mousasi defeated (United States) Chris Weidman from TKO (knees) in round 2.
  - (United States) Cynthia Calvillo defeated (United States) Pearl Gonzalez from Submission (rear-naked choke) in round 3.
  - (Brazil) Thiago Alves defeated (Canada) Patrick Côté from Decision (unanimous) (30–27, 30–27, 30–27) in round 3.
  - (Brazil) Charles Oliveira defeated (United States) Will Brooks from Submission (rear-naked choke) in round 1.
- April 14 – 16: UFC on Fox: Johnson vs. Reis in (United States) Kansas City, Missouri
  - (United States) Demetrious Johnson defeated (Brazil) Wilson Reis from Submission (armbar) in round 3.
  - (United States) Rose Namajunas defeated (United States) Michelle Waterson from Submission (rear-naked choke) in round 2.
  - (Australia) Robert Whittaker defeated (Brazil) Ronaldo Souza from TKO (head kick and punches) in round 2.
  - (Brazil) Renato Moicano defeated (United States) Jeremy Stephens from Decision (split) (29-28, 28-29, 29-28) in round 3.
- April 21 - 23: UFC Fight Night: Swanson vs. Lobov in (United States) Nashville
  - (United States) Cub Swanson defeated (Russia) Artem Lobov from Decision (unanimous) (49–46, 49–46, 50–45) in round 5.
  - (United States) Al Iaquinta defeated (United States) Diego Sanchez from KO (punches) in round 1.
  - (United States) Ovince Saint Preux defeated (Brazil) Marcos Rogério de Lima from Submission (Von Flue choke) in round 2.
  - (United States) John Dodson defeated (United States) Eddie Wineland from Decision (unanimous) (29–28, 30–27, 30–27) in round 3.
  - (Scotland) Stevie Ray defeated (United States) Joe Lauzon from Decision (majority) (28–27, 29–27, 28–28) in round 3.
  - (United States) Mike Perry defeated (United States) Jake Ellenberger from KO (elbow) in round 2.
- May 12 - 14: UFC 211 in (United States) Dallas
  - (United States) Stipe Miocic defeated (Brazil) Junior dos Santos from TKO (punches) in round 1.
  - (Poland) Joanna Jedrzejczyk defeated (Brazil) Jéssica Andrade from Decision (unanimous) (50–45, 50–44, 50–45) in round 5.
  - (Brazil) Demian Maia defeated (United States) Jorge Masvidal from Decision (split) (29–28, 28–29, 29–28) in round 3.
  - (United States) Frankie Edgar defeated (Mexico) Yair Rodríguez from TKO (doctor stoppage) in round 2.
  - (United States) David Branch defeated (Poland) Krzysztof Jotko from Decision (split) (29–28, 28–29, 29–28) in round 3.
- May 26 - 28: UFC Fight Night: Gustafsson vs. Teixeira in (Sweden) Stockholm
  - (Sweden) Alexander Gustafsson defeated (Brazil) Glover Teixeira from KO (punches) in round 5.
  - (Switzerland) Volkan Oezdemir defeated (Canada) Misha Cirkunov from TKO (punch) in round 1.
  - (Germany) Peter Sobotta defeated (United States) Ben Saunders from TKO (punches and knee) in round 2.
  - (Russia) Omari Akhmedov defeated (United States) Abdul Razak Alhassan from Decision (split) (30–27, 28–29, 30–27) in round 3.
  - (Canada) Nordine Taleb defeated (Sweden) Oliver Enkamp from Decision (unanimous) (30–27, 30–27, 29–28) in round 3.
  - (Norway) Jack Hermansson defeated (United States) Alex Nicholson from TKO (punches) in round 1.
- June 2 - 4: UFC 212 in (Brazil) Rio de Janeiro
  - (United States) Max Holloway defeated (Brazil) José Aldo from TKO (punches) in round 3.
  - (United States) Cláudia Gadelha defeated (Poland) Karolina Kowalkiewicz from Submission (rear-naked choke) in round 1.
  - (Brazil) Vitor Belfort defeated (United States) Nate Marquardt from Decision (unanimous) (29–28, 29–28, 29–28) in round 3.
  - (Brazil) Paulo Costa defeated (United States) Oluwale Bamgbose from TKO (punches) in round 2.
  - (United States) Yancy Medeiros defeated (Brazil) Erick Silva from TKO (punches) in round 2.
- June 9 - 11: UFC Fight Night: Lewis vs. Hunt in (New Zealand) Auckland
  - (New Zealand) Mark Hunt defeated (United States) Derrick Lewis from TKO (punches) in round 4.
  - (United States) Derek Brunson defeated (Australia) Dan Kelly from KO (punches) in round 1.
  - (New Zealand) Dan Hooker defeated (United Kingdom) Ross Pearson from KO (knee) in round 2.
  - (Moldova) Ion Cutelaba defeated (Brazil) Henrique da Silva from KO (punches) in round 1.
  - (Australia) Ben Nguyen defeated (United States) Tim Elliott from Submission (rear-naked choke) in round 1.
  - (Australia) Alexander Volkanovski defeated (Japan) Mizuto Hirota from Decision (unanimous) (30–27, 30–27, 30–27) in round 3.
- June 16 - 18: UFC Fight Night: Holm vs. Correia in (Singapore) Kallang
  - (United States) Holly Holm defeated (Brazil) Bethe Correia from KO (head kick and punches) in round 3.
  - (Poland) Marcin Tybura defeated (Belarus) Andrei Arlovski from Decision (unanimous) (29–28, 28–27, 29–27) in round 3.
  - (United States) Colby Covington defeated (South Korea) Dong Hyun Kim from Decision (unanimous) (30–25, 30–26, 30–27) in round 3.
  - (Brazil) Rafael dos Anjos defeated (United States) Tarec Saffiedine by Decision (unanimous) (30–27, 30–27, 29–28) in round 3.
- June 23 - 25: UFC Fight Night: Chiesa vs. Lee in (United States) Oklahoma City
  - (United States) Kevin Lee defeated (United States) Michael Chiesa from Technical Submission (rear-naked choke) in round 1.
  - (United States) Tim Boetsch defeated (United States) Johny Hendricks from TKO (head kick and punches) in round 2.
  - (United States) Felice Herrig defeated (United States) Justine Kish from Decision (unanimous) (30–26, 30–26, 29–27) in round 3.
  - (United States) Dominick Reyes defeated (Denmark) Joachim Christensen from TKO (punches) in round 1.
  - (United States) Tim Means defeated (Canada) Alex Garcia from Decision (unanimous) (29–28, 29–28, 29–28) in round 3.
  - (Germany) Dennis Siver defeated (United States) B.J. Penn from Decision (majority) (28–28, 29–28, 29–27) in round 3.
- July 6 - 8: The Ultimate Fighter: Redemption Finale in (United States) Paradise
  - (United States) Justin Gaethje defeated (United States) Michael Johnson from TKO (punches and knees) in round 2.
  - (United States) Jesse Taylor defeated (Brazil) Dhiego Lima from Submission (rear-naked choke) in round 2.
  - (United States) Drakkar Klose defeated (United Kingdom) Marc Diakiese from Decision (split) (29-28, 28-29, 29-28) in round 3.
  - (United States) Jared Cannonier defeated (United States) Nick Roehrick from TKO (elbows) in round 3.
  - (United States) Brad Tavares defeated (Canada) Elias Theodorou from Decision (unanimous) (29-28, 29-28, 29-28) in round 3.
  - (United States) Jordan Johnson defeated (United States) Marcel Fortuna from Decision (unanimous) (29-28, 29-28, 29-28) in round 3.
- July 7 - 9: UFC 213 in (United States) Paradise
  - (Australia) Robert Whittaker defeated (United States) Yoel Romero from Decision (unanimous) (48-47, 48-47, 48-47) in round 5.
  - (Netherlands) Alistair Overeem defeated (Brazil) Fabrício Werdum from Decision (majority) (28-28, 29-28, 29-28) in round 3.
  - (United States) Curtis Blaydes defeated (Poland) Daniel Omielanczuk from Decision (unanimous) (30-27, 30-27, 30-27)
  - (United States) Anthony Pettis defeated (United States) Jim Miller from Decision (unanimous) (30-27, 30-27, 30-27) in round 3.
  - (United States) Rob Font defeated (Brazil) Douglas Silva de Andrade from Submission (guillotine choke) in round 2.
- July 14 - 16: UFC Fight Night: Nelson vs. Ponzinibbio in (Scotland) Glasgow
  - (Argentina) Santiago Ponzinibbio defeated (Iceland) Gunnar Nelson from KO (punches) in round 1.
  - (United States) Cynthia Calvillo defeated (United States) Joanne Calderwood from Decision (unanimous) (30-27, 30-27, 29-28) in round 3.
  - (United States) Paul Felder defeated (Scotland) Stevie Ray from KO (elbows) in round 1.
  - (Wales) Jack Marshman defeated (Canada) Ryan Janes from Decision (unanimous) (29-28, 29-28, 29-28) in round 3.
  - (United States) Khalil Rountree Jr. defeated (Scotland) Paul Craig from KO (punches) in round 1.
  - (United States) Justin Willis defeated (United Kingdom) James Mulheron from Decision (unanimous) (30-27, 30-27, 30-27) in round 3.
- July 21 - 23: UFC on Fox: Weidman vs. Gastelum in (United States) Uniondale, New York
  - (United States) Chris Weidman defeated (United States) Kelvin Gastelum from Submission (arm-triangle choke) in round 3.
  - (United States) Darren Elkins defeated (United States) Dennis Bermudez from Decision (split) (29-28, 28-29, 29-28) in round 3.
  - (United States) Patrick Cummins defeated (United States) Gian Villante from Decision (split) (29-28, 28-29, 29-28) in round 3.
  - (United States) Jimmie Rivera defeated (Brazil) Thomas Almeida from Decision (unanimous) (29-28, 30-26, 30-27) in round 3.
- July 28 - 30: UFC 214 in (United States) Anaheim
  - (United States) Daniel Cormier vs. (United States) Jon Jones Result: No Contest (overturned by CSAC) in round 3.
  - (United States) Tyron Woodley defeated (Brazil) Demian Maia from Decision (unanimous) (50-45, 49-46, 49-46) in round 5.
  - (Brazil) Cris Cyborg defeated (United States) Tonya Evinger from TKO (knees) in round 3.
  - (United States) Robbie Lawler defeated (United States) Donald Cerrone from Decision (unanimous) (29-28, 29-28, 29-28) in round 3.
  - (Switzerland) Volkan Oezdemir defeated (United Kingdom) Jimi Manuwa from KO (punches) in round 1.
- August 4 - 6: UFC Fight Night: Pettis vs. Moreno in Mexico City
  - (United States) Sergio Pettis defeated (Mexico) Brandon Moreno from Decision (unanimous) (49-46, 48-46, 48-46) in round 5.
  - (Mexico) Alexa Grasso defeated (Canada) Randa Markos from Decision (split) (29-28, 28-29, 29-28) in round 3.
  - (United States) Niko Price defeated (United States) Alan Jouban from TKO (punches) in round 1.
  - (Peru) Humberto Bandenay defeated (Mexico) Martin Bravo from KO (knee) in round 1.
  - (United States) Sam Alvey defeated (United States) Rashad Evans from Decision (split) (28-29, 29-28, 29-28) in round 3.
  - (United States) Alejandro Pérez defeated (United States) Andre Soukhamthath from Decision (split) (29-28, 28-29, 29-28) in round 3.
- September 1 - 3: UFC Fight Night: Volkov vs. Struve in (Netherlands) Rotterdam
  - (Russia) Alexander Volkov defeated (Netherlands) Stefan Struve from TKO (punches) in round 3.
  - (Netherlands) Siyar Bahadurzada defeated (Australia) Rob Wilkinson from TKO (punches) in round 2.
  - (United States) Marion Reneau defeated (Brazil) Talita Bernardo from TKO (punches) in round 3.
  - (United Kingdom) Leon Edwards defeated (United States) Bryan Barberena from Decision (unanimous) (29-28, 29-28, 29-28) in round 3.
- September 8 - 10: UFC 215 in (Canada) Edmonton
  - (Brazil) Amanda Nunes defeated (Kyrgyzstan) Valentina Shevchenko from Decision (split) (47-48, 48-47, 48-47) in round 5.
  - (Brazil) Rafael dos Anjos defeated (United States) Neil Magny from Submission (arm-triangle choke) in round 1.
  - (United States) Henry Cejudo defeated (Brazil) Wilson Reis from TKO (punches) in round 2.
  - (Sweden) Ilir Latifi defeated (Australia) Tyson Pedro from Decision (unanimous) (29-28, 29-28, 30-27) in round 3.
  - (United States) Jeremy Stephens defeated (United States) Gilbert Melendez from Decision (unanimous) (30-26, 30-26, 30-25) in round 3.
- September 15 - 17: UFC Fight Night: Rockhold vs. Branch in (United States) Pittsburgh
  - (United States) Luke Rockhold defeated (United States) David Branch from Submission (punches) in round 2.
  - (United States) Mike Perry defeated (United States) Alex Reyes from KO (knee) in round 1.
  - (United States) Anthony Smith defeated (Australia) Hector Lombard from TKO (punches) in round 3.
  - (United States) Gregor Gillespie defeated (United States) Jason Gonzalez from Submission (arm-triangle choke) in round 2.
  - (United States) Kamaru Usman defeated (Brazil) Sérgio Moraes from KO (punch) in round 1.
  - (United States) Justin Ledet defeated (United States) Zu Anyanwu from Decision (split) (28-29, 29-28, 29-28) in round 3.
- September 22 - 24: UFC Fight Night: Saint Preux vs. Okami in (Japan) Saitama
  - (United States) Ovince Saint Preux defeated (Japan) Yushin Okami from Technical Submission (Von Flue choke) in round 1.
  - (Brazil) Jéssica Andrade defeated (United States) Cláudia Gadelha from Decision (unanimous) (30-25, 30-26, 30-27) in round 3.
  - (South Korea) Dong Hyun Ma defeated (Japan) Takanori Gomi from TKO (punches) in round 1.
  - (Turkey) Gökhan Saki defeated (Brazil) Henrique da Silva from KO (punch) in round 1.
  - (Japan) Teruto Ishihara defeated (Philippines) Rolando Dy from Decision (unanimous) (28-27, 28-27, 29-27) in round 3.
  - (Brazil) Jussier Formiga defeated (Japan) Ulka Sasaki from Submission (rear-naked choke) in round 1.

== Taekwondo ==
=== International taekwondo events ===
- February 6 – 9: 2017 WTF European Clubs Taekwondo Championships in Belek
  - Turkey won both the gold and overall medal tallies.
- April 6 – 9: 2017 European U21 Taekwondo Championships in (Bulgaria) Sofia
  - Russia won both the gold and overall medal tallies.
- April 7 – 9: 2017 WTF President's Cup (African Region) in (Morocco) Agadir
  - Iran won the gold medal tally. Croatia won the overall medal tally.
- April 13 & 14: 2017 WTF Asian Clubs Taekwondo Championships in Sari, Iran
  - Champions: (Iran) Shahrdari Varamin; Second: (Iran) Shohadaye Modafe Haram; Third: (Iran) Moghavemat
- April 19 – 21: 2017 Asian Junior Taekwondo Championships in (Kazakhstan) Atyrau
  - Iran won the gold medal tally. South Korea won the overall medal tally.
- April 24 – 30: ITF European Taekwon-Do Championships 2017 in (England) Liverpool
  - For results, click here.
- April 27 – 30: 2017 WTF President's Cup (European Region) in (Greece) Athens
  - Russia and Iran won 4 gold medals each. Turkey and Russia won 11 overall medals each.
- May 5 & 6: 2017 WTF Taekwondo Beach World Championships (Greece) Rhodes (debut event)
  - Thailand won the gold medal tally. Turkey won the overall medal tally.
- June 6 – 8: 2017 Asian Taekwondo Cadet Championships in (Vietnam) Ho Chi Minh City
  - Iran won both the gold and overall medal tallies.
- June 22 – 30: 2017 World Taekwondo Championships in Muju
  - South Korea won both the gold and overall medal tallies.
- August 4 – 6: 2017 World Taekwondo Grand-Prix Series 1 in (Russia) Moscow
  - South Korea won both the gold and overall medal tallies.
- August 11 – 13: 2017 WTF President's Cup (Asian Region) in Tashkent
  - Uzbekistan won both the gold and overall medal tallies.
- August 24 – 27: 2017 World Cadet Taekwondo Championships in (Egypt) Sharm El Sheikh
  - Thailand, Iran, and Mexico won 3 gold medals each. Thailand and Iran won 9 overall medals each.
- August 29 – 31: 2017 Pan American Cadet and Junior Taekwondo Championships in San José, Costa Rica
  - Junior: Mexico and the United States won 6 gold medals each. Mexico won the overall medal tally.
  - Cadet: The United States won both the gold and overall medal tallies.
- September 22 – 24: 2017 World Taekwondo Grand-Prix Series 2 in (Morocco) Rabat
  - South Korea won both the gold and overall medal tallies.
- September 27 & 28: 2017 Commonwealth Taekwondo Championships in Montreal
  - Canada won both the gold and overall medal tallies.
- October 5 – 8: 2017 WTF President's Cup (Pan American Region) in Las Vegas
  - Brazil won the gold medal tally. The United States won the overall medal tally.
- October 5 – 8: 2017 European Cadet Taekwondo Championships in (Hungary) Budapest
  - Russia won both the gold and overall medal tallies.
- October 20 – 22: 2017 World Taekwondo Grand-Prix Series 3 in (United Kingdom) London
  - Great Britain won the gold medal tally. Great Britain and Russia won 5 overall medals each.
- November 2 – 4: 2017 European Junior Taekwondo Championships in (Cyprus) Larnaca
  - Russia won both the gold and overall medal tallies.
- December 2 & 3: 2017 World Taekwondo Grand Prix Final in (Ivory Coast) Abidjan
  - South Korea and Great Britain won 2 gold medals each. South Korea won the overall medal tally.
- December 5 & 6: 2017 World Cup Taekwondo Team Championships in Abidjan
  - Men's Champions: Iran; Second: Russia; Third: South Korea & Ivory Coast
  - Women's Champions: China; Second: South Korea; Third: Morocco & Ivory Coast
  - Mixed Team Champions: China; Second: Russia; Third: South Korea & a joint team from Mexico & the United States

=== WTF's Open events ===
- January 21 & 22: 2017 German Open in (Germany) Hamburg
  - Great Britain won the gold medal tally. Russia won the overall medal tally.
- January 31 – February 3: 2017 US Open in Las Vegas
  - Thailand won the gold medal tally. The United States won the overall medal tally.
- February 11 – 14: 2017 Turkish Open in (Turkey) Belek
  - Russia won both the gold and overall medal tallies.
- February 17 – 19: 2017 Egyptian Open in Luxor
  - Egypt won both the gold and overall medal tallies.
- February 23 – 25: 2017 Fujairah Open in the United Arab Emirates
  - Russia won all the gold medals and the overall medal tally, too.
- March 4 & 5: 2017 Sofia Open in Bulgaria
  - Croatia won both the gold and overall medal tallies.
- March 11 & 12: 2017 Dutch Open in (Netherlands) Eindhoven
  - Turkey and Azerbaijan won 5 gold medals each. Turkey won the overall medal tally.
- March 14 – 17: 2017 Colombia Open Bogotá
  - Colombia won both the gold and overall medal tallies.
- March 17 – 19: 2017 Belgian Open in (Belgium) Lommel
  - Croatia, Sweden, and Thailand won 2 gold medals each. Germany won the overall medal tally.
- March 26: 2017 Spanish Open in Alicante
  - Spain won both the gold and overall medal tallies.
- April 16 & 17: 2017 Fajr Open in Sari
  - Iran won both the gold and overall medal tallies.
- April 22 – 24: 2017 Kazakh Open in Atyrau
  - Kazakhstan and Iran won 6 gold medals each. Kazakhstan won the overall medal tally.
- May 13 & 14: 2017 New Zealand Open in Auckland
  - Chinese Taipei won the gold medal tally. Australia won the overall medal tally.
- May 20 & 21: 2017 Moldova Open in Chișinău
  - Serbia, Great Britain, Hungary, and Slovenia won 2 gold medals each. Serbia and Turkey won 5 overall medals each.
- June 3 & 4: 2017 Austrian Open in (Austria) Innsbruck
  - Croatia won both the gold and overall medal tallies.
- June 10 & 11: 2017 Lux Open in Luxembourg City
  - Germany won both the gold and overall medal tallies.
- July 2 – 7: 2017 Korean Open in Chuncheon
  - South Korea won both the gold and overall medal tallies.
- August 8 & 9: 2017 Russian Open in Moscow
  - Russia won both the gold and overall medal tallies.
- August 18 – 20: 2017 Argentina Open in Buenos Aires
  - Brazil won both the gold and overall medal tallies.
- September 1 – 3: 2017 Costa Rica Open in San José, Costa Rica
  - The United States won both the gold and overall medal tallies.
- September 16 & 17: 2017 Polish Open in (Poland) Warsaw
  - Croatia won the gold medal tally. Russia won the overall medal tally.
- September 28 – 30: 2017 Palestinian Open in (Palestine) Ramallah
  - Jordan won both the gold and overall medal tallies.
- October 14 & 15: 2017 Serbia Open in Belgrade
  - Spain won both the gold and overall medal tallies.
- November 17 – 19: 2017 Greek Open in Athens
  - Greece won both the gold and overall medal tallies.
- November 18 & 19: 2017 French Open in Paris
  - Spain won the gold medal tally. France won the overall medal tally.
- November 25 & 26: 2017 Israeli Open in (Israel) Ramla
  - Moldova won the gold medal tally. Greece won the overall medal tally.

== Wrestling ==
=== International wrestling championships ===
- August 1 – 6: 2017 World Junior Wrestling Championships in (Finland) Tampere
  - Junior Men's Freestyle: Russia won the gold medal tally. The United States won the overall medal tally.
  - Junior Women's Freestyle: Japan won both the gold and overall medal tallies.
  - Junior Greco-Roman: Iran won the gold medal tally. Iran and Russia won 5 overall medals each.
- August 21 – 27: 2017 World Wrestling Championships in (France) Paris
  - Men's Freestyle: The United States and Georgia won 2 gold medals each. The United States won the overall medal tally.
  - Women's Freestyle: Japan won both the gold and overall medal tallies.
  - Greco-Roman: Turkey and Armenia won 2 gold medals each. Russia won the overall medal tally.
- September 5 – 10: 2017 World Cadet Wrestling Championships in (Greece) Athens
  - Cadet Men's Freestyle: The United States won the gold medal tally. Russia won the overall medal tally.
  - Cadet Women's Freestyle: Japan won both the gold and overall medal tallies.
  - Cadet Greco-Roman: Ukraine won the gold medal tally. Russia won the overall medal tally.
- September 20 – 23: 2017 World Military Wrestling Championships in (Lithuania) Klaipėda
  - Men's Freestyle: Russia won both the gold and overall medal tallies.
  - Women's Freestyle: China and Mongolia won 2 gold medals each. China won the overall medal tally.
  - Greco-Roman: Russia and Ukraine won 2 gold medals each. Russia won the overall medal tally.
- October 10 – 15: 2017 World Veteran Wrestling Championships in (Bulgaria) Plovdiv
  - For results, click here and click on the Results & Videos tab.
- October 13 – 15: 2017 World Beach Wrestling Championships in (Turkey) Dalyan
  - For results, click here and click on the Results & Videos tab.
- November 21 – 26: 2017 World U-23 Wrestling Championships in (Poland) Bydgoszcz
  - Men's U23 Freestyle: Russia won both the gold and overall medal tallies.
  - Women's U23 Freestyle: Japan won both the gold and overall medal tallies.
  - U23 Greco-Roman: Russia and Turkey won 2 gold medals each. Russia, Turkey, and Georgia won 4 overall medals each.
- December 14 – 17: 2017 Commonwealth Wrestling Championships in (South Africa) Johannesburg
  - Men's Freestyle: India won all the gold medals, in addition to winning the overall medal tally, too.
  - Women's Freestyle: India won both the gold and overall medal tallies.
  - Greco-Roman: India won all the gold and silver medals, in addition to winning the overall medal tally, too.

=== World Cup of wrestling ===
- February 16 & 17: 2017 Wrestling World Cup - Men's freestyle in Tehran
  - Champions: Iran; Second: United States; Third: Azerbaijan
- March 16 & 17: 2017 Wrestling World Cup - Men's Greco-Roman in Tehran
  - Champions: Russia; Second: Azerbaijan; Third: Iran
- December 1 & 2: 2017 Wrestling World Cup - Women's freestyle in (Russia) Cheboksary
  - Champions: Japan; Second: China; Third: Mongolia
- December 7 & 8: 2017 World Wrestling Clubs Cup (Men's Freestyle) in (Iran) Tehran
  - Champions: (Iran) Easy Pipe Kashan; Second: (United States) Titan Mercury; Third: (Iran) Setaregan Sari
- December 14 & 15: 2017 World Wrestling Clubs Cup (Greco-Roman) in (Iran) Tehran
  - Champions: (Iran) Bimeh Razi Isfahan; Second: (Iran) Sina Sanat Izeh; Third: (Turkey) Buyuksehir

=== Wrestling Grand Prix ===
- March 10 – 12: 2017 Grand Prix Zagreb Open in Croatia
  - Greco-Roman: Croatia and Hungary won 2 gold medals each. Croatia and the United States won 5 overall medals each.
- June 3 & 4: 2017 Grand Prix of Germany in Dormagen
  - Women's Freestyle: Canada won the gold medal tally. Germany won the overall medal tally.
- June 10 – 12: 2017 Grand Prix of Tbilisi in Georgia
  - Men's Freestyle: Georgia won both the gold and overall medal tallies.
  - Greco-Roman: Georgia won both the gold and overall medal tallies.
- July 15 & 16: 2017 Grand Prix of Spain in Madrid
  - Men's Freestyle: The United States won both the gold and overall medal tallies.
  - Women's Freestyle: The United States and Russia won 2 gold medals each. The United States won the overall medal tally.
  - Greco-Roman: Japan won both the gold and overall medal tallies.

=== Continental wrestling championships ===
- March 9 – 12: 2017 Oceania (Senior, Junior, & Cadet) Wrestling Championships in (French Polynesia) Pirae
  - Note: There was no Cadet Women's Freestyle event here.
  - Men's Freestyle: New Zealand won both the gold and overall medal tallies.
  - Women's Freestyle: New Zealand won both the gold and overall medal tallies.
  - Greco-Roman winners: (Federated States of Micronesia) Thomas Wichilbuch (71 kg) / (Palau) Skarlee Renguul (75 kg) / (French Polynesia) Tevaihi Trafton (85 kg) / (French Polynesia) Jean Tautu (130 kg)
  - Junior Men's Freestyle winners: (New Zealand) Samuel Harrison (55 kg) / (New Zealand) Suraj Singh (60 kg) / (Guam) Paul Aguon III (66 kg) / (American Samoa) Iafeta Peni Vou (74 kg)
  - Junior Women's Freestyle winners: (New Zealand) Mystique Townsend (48 kg) / (Australia) Aliena Coleman (72 kg)
  - Junior Greco-Roman winners: (Palau) Randy Ngeyus (60 kg) / (New Zealand) Nicholas Low (66 kg) / (American Samoa) Iafeta Peni Vou (74 kg)
  - Cadet Men's Freestyle winners: (New Zealand) Ryan Marshall (69 kg) / (French Polynesia) Terangi Vinckier (76 kg)
  - Cadet Greco-Roman: (New Zealand) Samuel Harrison (58 kg) / (New Zealand) Benjamin Tustin (63 kg) / (French Polynesia) Kylian Asin Moux (76 kg)
- March 28 – April 2: 2017 European U23 Wrestling Championship in (Hungary) Szombathely
  - Men's Freestyle: Georgia won the gold medal tally. Russia won the overall medal tally.
  - Women's Freestyle: Ukraine and Russia won 2 gold and 5 overall medals each.
  - Greco-Roman: Azerbaijan won the gold medal tally. Georgia won the overall medal tally.
- April 26 – 30: 2017 African (Senior, Junior, & Cadet) Wrestling Championships in Marrakesh
  - Men's Freestyle: Egypt and Nigeria won 3 gold medals each. Egypt and Tunisia won 5 overall medals each.
  - Women's Freestyle: Nigeria, Tunisia, and Cameroon won 2 gold medals each. Nigeria and Tunisia won 6 overall medals each.
  - Greco-Roman: Egypt won the gold medal tally. Morocco won the overall medal tally.
  - Junior Men's Freestyle: Algeria and Egypt won 3 gold and 5 overall medals each.
  - Junior Women's Freestyle: Tunisia won both the gold and overall medal tallies.
  - Junior Greco-Roman: Tunisia and Egypt won 3 gold medals each. Tunisia won the overall medal tally.
  - Cadet Men's Freestyle: South Africa and Algeria won 3 gold medals each. South Africa won the overall medal tally.
  - Cadet Women's Freestyle: Tunisia won both the gold and overall medal tallies.
  - Cadet Greco-Roman: Tunisia and Algeria won 3 gold medals each. Tunisia won the overall medal tally.
- May 2 – 7: 2017 European Wrestling Championships in (Serbia) Novi Sad
  - Men's Freestyle: Turkey won the gold medal tally. Russia won the overall medal tally.
  - Women's Freestyle: Russia won the gold medal tally. Russia, Belarus, Azerbaijan, and Ukraine won 3 overall medals each.
  - Greco-Roman: Hungary won the gold medal tally. Russia won the overall medal tally.
- May 5 – 7: 2017 Pan American Wrestling Championships in (Brazil) Salvador, Bahia
  - Men's Freestyle: The United States won the gold medal tally. The United States and Cuba won 7 overall medals each.
  - Women's Freestyle: Canada won both the gold and overall medal tallies.
  - Greco-Roman: Cuba won the gold medal tally. Cuba and the United States won 5 overall medals each.
- May 10 – 14: 2017 Asian Wrestling Championships in (India) New Delhi
  - Men's Freestyle: Iran won both the gold and overall medal tallies.
  - Women's Freestyle: Japan won both the gold and overall medal tallies.
  - Grecoo-Roman: Iran won both the gold and overall medal tallies.
- May 27 & 28: 2017 Nordic Junior and Cadet Wrestling Championships in (Denmark) Kolding
  - Note: There were no junior men's and women's freestyle events here.
  - Junior Greco-Roman: Sweden won the gold medal tally. Finland and Norway won 5 overall medals each.
  - Cadet Men's Freestyle: Finland won both the gold and overall medal tallies.
  - Cadet Women's Freestyle: Sweden won both the gold and overall medal tallies.
  - Cadet Greco-Roman: Finland and Sweden won 3 gold medals each. Finland won the overall medal tally.
- June 9 – 11: 2017 Pan American Junior Wrestling Championships in (Peru) Lima
  - Junior Men's Freestyle: The United States won both the gold and overall medal tallies.
  - Junior Women's Freestyle: Canada, Cuba, and the United States won 2 gold medals each. Canada won the overall medal tally.
  - Junior Greco-Roman: The United States won both the gold and overall medal tallies.
- June 10: 2017 Nordic Wrestling Championships in Panevėžys
  - Men's Freestyle: Lithuania won both the gold and overall medal tallies.
  - Women's Freestyle: Lithuania won both the gold and overall medal tallies.
  - Greco-Roman: Lithuania won the gold medal tally. Finland won the overall medal tally.
- June 15 – 18: 2017 Asian Junior Wrestling Championships in (Chinese Taipei) Taichung
  - Junior Men's Freestyle: Iran won both the gold and overall medal tallies.
  - Junior Women's Freestyle: China won both the gold and overall medal tallies.
  - Junior Greco-Roman: Iran won both the gold and overall medal tallies.
- June 16 – 18: 2017 South American Junior Wrestling Championships in Lima
  - Junior Men's Freestyle: Colombia won both the gold and overall medal tallies.
  - Junior Women's Freestyle: Ecuador won the gold medal tally. Peru won the overall medal tally.
  - Junior Greco-Roman: Peru won both the gold and overall medal tallies.
- June 27 – July 2: 2017 European Junior Wrestling Championships in (Germany) Dortmund
  - Junior Men's Freestyle: Russia won the gold medal tally. Russia and Azerbaijan won 6 overall medals each.
  - Junior Women's Freestyle: Russia won both the gold and overall medal tallies.
  - Junior Greco-Roman: Georgia won both the gold and overall medal tallies.
- July 7 – 9: 2017 Pan American Cadet Wrestling Championships in (Argentina) Buenos Aires
  - Cadet Men's Freestyle: The United States won both the gold and overall medal tallies.
  - Cadet Women's Freestyle: The United States won both the gold and overall medal tallies.
  - Cadet Greco-Roman: Mexico won the gold medal tally. The United States won the overall medal tally.
- July 13 – 15: 2017 South American Cadet Wrestling Championships in Buenos Aires
  - Cadet Men's Freestyle: Argentina and Brazil won 3 gold medals each. Argentina won the overall medal tally.
  - Cadet Women's Freestyle: Ecuador won the gold medal tally. Argentina won the overall medal tally.
  - Cadet Greco-Roman: Argentina won both the gold and overall medal tallies.
- July 20 – 23: 2017 Asian Cadet Wrestling Championships in (Thailand) Bangkok
  - Cadet Men's Freestyle: Iran won both the gold and overall medal tallies.
  - Cadet Women's Freestyle: Japan won both the gold and overall medal tallies.
  - Cadet Greco-Roman: Kazakhstan won the gold medal tally. Iran won the overall medal tally.
- July 25 – 30: 2017 European Cadet Wrestling Championships in (Bosnia and Herzegovina) Sarajevo
  - Cadet Men's Freestyle: Russia won both the gold and overall medal tallies.
  - Cadet Women's Freestyle: Russia won both the gold and overall medal tallies.
  - Cadet Greco-Roman: Russia and Azerbaijan won 3 gold medals each. Russia and Georgia won 5 overall medals each.
- October 27 – 29: 2017 Balkan Junior Wrestling Championships in Bursa
  - Junior Men's Freestyle: Turkey won both the gold and overall medal tallies.
  - Junior Women's Freestyle: Romania won the gold medal tally. Romania and Turkey won 8 overall medals each.
  - Junior Greco-Roman: Turkey won both the gold and overall medal tallies.
- November 22 & 23: 2017 South American Wrestling Championships in Rio de Janeiro
  - Men's Freestyle: Argentina and Peru won 3 gold medals each. Brazil won the overall medal tally.
  - Women's Freestyle: Brazil won both the gold and overall medal tallies.
  - Greco-Roman: Brazil won both the gold and overall medal tallies.
