= Canelo Álvarez vs. Alfredo Angulo =

2014 professional boxing match

Toe to Toe
- Date: March 8, 2014
- Venue: MGM Grand Garden Arena; Paradise, Nevada, United States

Tale of the tape
Boxer	Saúl Álvarez	Alfredo Angulo
Nickname	Canelo ("Cinnamon")	El Perro ("The Dog")
Hometown	Guadalajara, Jalisco, Mexico	Mexicali, Baja California, Mexico
Purse	> $1,250,000	> $850,000
Pre-fight record	42–1–1 (38 KOs)	22–3 (18 KOs)
Age	23 years, 7 months	31 years, 6 months
Height	5 ft 7 1/2 in (171 cm)	5 ft 9+1/2 in
Weight	155 lb (70 kg)	154 1/2 lb (70 kg)
Style	Orthodox	Orthodox
Recognition	WBC/TBRB; No. 2 Ranked Light Middleweight; The Ring; No. 1 Ranked Light Middleweight; WBA; No. 3 Ranked Light Middleweight; IBF; No. 5 Ranked Light Middleweight; The Ring No. 9 ranked pound-for-pound fighter	WBA; No. 7 Ranked Light Middleweight; Former WBO Interim light middleweight champion

Result
- Álvarez wins via 10th-round TKO

Canelo Álvarez vs. Alfredo Angulo, billed as Toe to Toe, was a professional boxing match contested on March 8, 2014, at the MGM Grand Garden Arena, shown on Showtime PPV.

== Background ==
On 9 January 2014, Golden Boy chief executive Richard Schaefer confirmed a deal had been made for a fight between Álvarez and Alfredo Angulo to take place on 8 March, on Showtime PPV at the MGM Grand in Las Vegas. In March, ESPN reported the fight would take place at a catchweight of 155 lbs, due to Álvarez not being able to make the light middleweight limit of 154 lbs. For the PPV fight, Álvarez agreed to pay $100,000 of his minimum $1.25 million purse to Angulo, which would raise his purse $850,000. Also in the negotiations, Álvarez agreed to weigh no more than 168 lbs on fight night. This was Álvarez's first of five fights which took place at the 155-pound catchweight. On fight night, Álvarez weighed 174 lbs on Showtime's scale and Angulo weighed 170 lbs.

== The fight ==
In front of 14,610 at the MGM, Álvarez came out strong, throwing combinations. In a fairly lopsided beating, Álvarez scored a tenth-round stoppage over Angulo punctuated by a lead left uppercut. The end of the fight began in round six, when Angulo's left eye started swelling. When the referee waived the fight off, the crowd was displeased and booed. At the time of stoppage, two judges had it 89–82 and the third judge had it 88–83, all in favor of Álvarez.

== Aftermath ==
Angulo stated post-fight how he was unhappy with the stoppage, "I told Tony he did the wrong job tonight. The referee tells us to take care of ourselves at all times. I can take care of myself. My plan was to work harder in the final four or three rounds. I had good preparation for this fight." His trainer Virgil Hunter was also unhappy with referee Tony Weeks, "I'm very upset. I told the referee and the doctor that if Canelo put two or three shots together that I would stop the fight. He landed one punch. Everyone knows Alfredo was coming on strong, everyone knows that."

== Fight card ==
Confirmed bouts:

Weight class		vs.		Type	Round	Time	Notes
Middleweight	(Mexico) Canelo Álvarez	def.	(Mexico) Alfredo Angulo	TKO	10/12	1:00
Super bantamweight	(Mexico) Léo Santa Cruz	def.	(Mexico) Cristian Mijares	UD	12		^{Note 1}
Lightweight	(Venezuela) Jorge Linares	def.	(Japan) Nihito Arakawa	UD	10		^{Note 2}
Lightweight	(Mexico) Sergio Thompson	def.	(Mexico) Ricardo Álvarez	UD	10		^{Note 3}
Preliminary bouts
Super featherweight	(United States) Jerry Belmontes	def.	(Australia) Will Tomlinson	UD	10
Super featherweight	(Mexico) Francisco Vargas	def.	(Puerto Rico) Abner Cotto	UD	10
Super bantamweight	(United States) Joseph Diaz	def.	(Puerto Rico) Jovany Fuentes	TKO	5/8	2:59
Light Welterweight	(United States) Keandre Gibson	def.	(Mexico) Antonio Wong	TKO	4/6	1:54
Cruiserweight	(Australia) Steve Lovett	def.	(Mexico) Francisco Molina	KO	2/4	1:13

^Note 1 For WBC Super Bantamweight title
^Note 2 WBC Lightweight title eliminator
^Note 3 WBC International lightweight title

== Broadcasting ==
Country	Broadcaster
United States	Showtime

Preceded by vs. Floyd Mayweather Jr.	Canelo Álvarez's bouts 8 March 2014	Succeeded by vs. Erislandy Lara
Preceded by vs. Erislandy Lara	Alfredo Angulo's bouts 8 March 2014	Succeeded by vs. James de la Rosa
