= Azat Hovhannisyan =

Armenian boxer

Personal information
- Nickname: Crazy A
- Born: 15 August 1988 (age 38) Yerevan, Armenia
- Height: 5 ft 6 in (168 cm)
- Weight: Super-bantamweight

Boxing career
- Reach: 65 in (165 cm)
- Stance: Orthodox

Boxing record
- Total fights: 29
- Wins: 23
- Win by KO: 17
- Losses: 6

Azat Hovhannisyan (born 15 August 1988) is an Armenian professional boxer who challenged for the WBC super-bantamweight title in 2018.

== Professional career ==
Hovhannisyan made his professional debut on 23 April 2011, losing by unanimous decision (UD) over four rounds against Juan Reyes at the Nokia Theatre L.A. Live in Los Angeles, California.

After compiling a record of 12–2 (10 KOs) he faced Sergio Frias for the vacant WBC Continental Americas super-bantamweight title on 23 September 2017, at The Forum in Inglewood, California. Serving as part of the undercard for the world title fight between Jorge Linares and Luke Campbell, Hovhannisyan captured his first professional title with a wide UD victory. Two judges scored the bout 100–90 and the third scored it 98–92.

He made a successful defence of his regional title in March 2018, defeating Ronny Rios via sixth-round knockout (KO), before challenging WBC super-bantamweight champion Rey Vargas on 12 May at the Turning Stone Resort Casino in Verona, New York. Hovhannisyan suffered his third professional defeat, losing by UD with the judges scorecards reading 118–110, 117–111, and 116–112.

== Professional boxing record ==
29 fights	23 wins	6 losses
By knockout	17	1
By decision	6	5

No.	Result	Record	Opponent	Type	Round, time	Date	Location	Notes
29	Win	23–6	Eduardo Baez	MD	10	5 Apr 2026	Meta Apex, Enterprise, Nevada, U.S.	
28	Win	22–6	Aidos Medet	UD	8	23 Jan 2026	Thunder Studios, Long Beach, California, U.S.	
27	Loss	21–6	Sebastian Hernandez	UD	10	10 May 2025	Pechanga Arena, San Diego, California, U.S.	
26	Loss	21–5	David Picasso	UD	12	24 Aug 2024	Mexico City Arena, Mexico City, Mexico	For vacant WBC Silver super-bantamweight title
25	Loss	21–4	Luis Nery	KO	11 (12), 1:51	18 Feb 2023	Pomona Fox Theater, Pomona, California, US	
24	Win	21–3	Dagoberto Aguero	TKO	2 (10), 1:11	9 Apr 2022	Alamodome, San Antonio, Texas, US	
23	Win	20–3	Jose Santos Gonzalez	UD	10	9 Jul 2021	Banc of California Stadium, Los Angeles, California, US	
22	Win	19–3	Enrique Bernache	KO	8 (10), 2:59	13 Feb 2021	Fantasy Springs Resort Casino, Indio, California, US	
21	Win	18–3	Franklin Manzanilla	KO	4 (12), 2:58	5 Sep 2019	Belasco Theater, Los Angeles, California, US	
20	Win	17–3	Glenn Porras	KO	4 (10), 2:09	13 Jun 2019	Avalon Hollywood, Los Angeles, California, US	
19	Win	16–3	Lolito Sonsona	KO	5 (10), 2:23	9 Feb 2019	Fantasy Springs Resort Casino, Indio, California, US	
18	Win	15–3	Jesus Martinez	KO	4 (8), 0:30	12 Oct 2018	Belasco Theater, Los Angeles, California, US	
17	Loss	14–3	Rey Vargas	UD	12	12 May 2018	Turning Stone Resort Casino, Verona, New York, US	For WBC super-bantamweight title
16	Win	14–2	Ronny Rios	KO	6 (10), 1:12	9 Mar 2018	The Forum, Costa Mesa, California, US	Retained WBC Continental Americas super-bantamweight title
15	Win	13–2	Sergio Frias	UD	10	23 Sep 2017	The Forum, Inglewood, California, US	Won vacant WBC Continental Americas super-bantamweight title
14	Win	12–2	Isao Gonzalo Carranza	UD	8	2 Jun 2017	Belasco Theater, Los Angeles, California, US	
13	Win	11–2	Diuhl Olguin	KO	6 (8), 2:47	23 Mar 2017	Fantasy Springs Resort Casino, Indio, California, US	
12	Win	10–2	Israel Rojas	KO	1 (6), 1:31	4 Nov 2016	Belasco Theater, Los Angeles, California, US	
11	Win	9–2	Mario Ayala	KO	5 (6), 2:18	15 Jul 2016	Fantasy Springs Resort Casino, Indio, California, US	
10	Win	8–2	Jesus Serrano	KO	3 (8), 2:29	24 Oct 2015	Marriott Convention Center, Burbank, California, US	
9	Win	7–2	Daniel Quevedo	TKO	3 (6), 0:36	31 Jul 2015	Fair Grounds, Chino, California, US	
8	Loss	6–2	Walter Santibanes	MD	6	29 Nov 2014	Westin Bonaventure Hotel, Los Angeles, California, US	
7	Win	6–1	Ali González	KO	3 (6), 2:16	19 Sep 2014	Westin Bonaventure Hotel, Los Angeles, California, US	
6	Win	5–1	Manuel Galaviz	KO	2 (6), 2:36	18 Jul 2014	Quiet Cannon, Montebello, California, US	
5	Win	4–1	Raymond Chacon	UD	4	21 Sep 2012	Chumash Casino Resort, Santa Ynez, California, US	
4	Win	3–1	Michael Wood	TKO	3 (4), 1:32	24 Aug 2012	Geelong Arena, Geelong, Australia	
3	Win	2–1	William Fisher	KO	4 (4), 2:43	17 Feb 2012	Chumash Casino Resort, Santa Ynez, California, US	
2	Win	1–1	Sergey Tasimov	TKO	2 (6), 2:50	3 Sep 2011	Karen Demirchyan Complex, Yerevan, Armenia	
1	Loss	0–1	Juan Reyes	UD	4	23 Apr 2011	Nokia Theatre L.A. Live, Los Angeles, California, US	

Sporting positions
Regional boxing titles
Vacant Title last held by Horacio García	WBC Continental Americas super-bantamweight champion 23 September 2017 – April 2018; Challenged for the world title	Vacant Title next held by Carlos Castro
