= Jorge Linares =

Venezuelan boxer (born 1985)

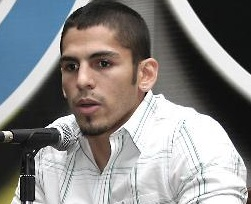
- Linares in 2013

Personal information
- Nicknames: El Niño de Oro ("The Golden Boy")
- Born: Jorge Luis Linares Palencia; 22 August 1985 (age 41) Barinas, Venezuela
- Height: 5 ft 7 in (170 cm)
- Weight: Super bantamweight; Featherweight; Super featherweight; Lightweight; Light welterweight

Boxing career
- Reach: 69 in (175 cm)
- Stance: Orthodox

Boxing record
- Total fights: 56
- Wins: 47
- Win by KO: 29
- Losses: 9

Jorge Luis Linares Palencia (born 22 August 1985) is a Venezuelan former professional boxer. He has held world championships in three weight classes, including the WBC featherweight title from 2007 to 2008; the WBA super featherweight title from 2008 to 2009; and the WBA, WBC and Ring magazine lightweight titles between 2014 and 2018.

== Amateur career ==
Linares compiled an 89-5 record as an amateur, winning several national junior championships in Venezuela. At the age of 17, Linares moved to Japan at the suggestion of his countryman, WBA president Gilberto Mendoza. Linares wanted to turn pro as soon as possible and he would've had to wait until he turned 18 in Venezuela.

== Professional career ==
=== Early career ===
Linares made his professional boxing debut managed by the Teiken Boxing Gym in December 2002. He was trained by Sendai Tanaka there, and Antonio Esparragoza who was trained by Tanaka's master Amílcar Bursa gave Linares the nickname of El Niño de Oro.

Linares made his debut at the age of 17 at featherweight. The fight took place at the Prefectural Gymnasium in Osaka, Japan on 15 December 2002. He knocked out Kyong-Soo Chung in the first round of their scheduled four round fight. His next fight took place in February 2003, a six-round bout against Chawal Sor Vorapin at the famous Korakuen Hall in Tokyo. The fight aired on NTV G+ in Japan. Vorapin was dropped in round 1 and Linares was down in round 2 as the fight went to the scorecards. Linares won a unanimous decision (59-54 58-54 58-54). In his next five fights, Linares floated between super bantamweight and featherweight and remained undefeated, winning three via stoppages.

On 31 January 2004 Linares, at the age of 19 fought for his first title, against 36 year old veteran and multiple weight world champion Hugo Rafael Soto (55-9-2, 38 KOs) in his home country of Venezuela at the El Poliedro in Caracas. Linares won the vacant WBA Fedelatin super bantamweight title after winning a unanimous decision with scores of 100-90, 100-90 and 99-91. Soto retired after this fight. In his tenth professional fight in August 2004, he won the vacant WBA Fedelatin featherweight title after defeating Renan Acosta (13–1, 5 KOs) at the Korakuen Hall in Tokyo. The fight went 10 rounds with the scores of 98-95 98-96 97-95 all in favor of Linares.

Following a string of four wins, all via stoppage, Linares challenged 30 year old Jean Javier Sotelo (13–2, 8 KOs) for the vacant WBA Fedecentro featherweight title. The fight took place at the Estadio Luna Park in Buenos Aires on 6 May 2005. Linares was knocked down for the first time in his career in round 2. He beat the count and knocked Sotelo down twice in round 2 forcing a stoppage win. Linares spent the next year fighting in Venezuela, Japan and South Korea.

=== Featherweight ===
==== Linares vs. Larios ====
On 21 July 2007, Linares fought on the undercard of Bernard Hopkins vs. Ronald Wright at the Mandalay Bay Resort & Casino in Nevada. It was the first time in his career that he would fight in the United States since turning professional. He fought former WBC super bantamweight champion Óscar Larios (59-5-1, 37 KOs) for the vacant WBC interim featherweight title. Linares dominated the action with his jab combinations and power punches which consequently backed up Larios, although he remained competitive. Larios did not try to counter anything thrown his way. In the tenth round, a flurry of power punches from Linares sent Larios to the canvas. Larios beat the count, but referee Vic Drakulich stopped the fight giving Linares the win via technical knockout. At the time stoppage, Linares was ahead on two of the judges scorecards 87-84 and 89-82 whilst the third judge had Larios ahead by one point 86-85.

==== Linares vs. Diaz ====
Linares made the first defense of his world title against former NABF featherweight champion Gamaliel Diaz (22-6-2, 9 KOs) on 15 December 2007 at the Plaza de Toros in Cancun, Mexico. Linares floored Diaz with a counter right hand in round eight, winning the bout via KO. Diaz was also knocked down in round four following a right uppercut. At the time of stoppage, Linares was ahead on two of the judges scorecards 68–64 and 67–65, whilst the third judge had it even at 66–66.

Linares relinquished the title on 13 August 2008, in order to move up to super featherweight. Another reason for vacating the title was that he needing more time to recover from injuries. Óscar Larios was elevated from Interim to full championship status.

=== Super featherweight ===
==== Linares vs. Garcia ====
Eleven months after his last fight, Linares challenged 27 year old Whyber Garcia (20–5, 14 KOs) for the vacant WBA super featherweight title. The fight took place on 28 November 2008 at the Centro de Convenciones Atlapa in Panama City. Linares won the fight and claimed the vacant WBA title via fifth-round technical knockout.

==== Linares vs. Perez ====
On 27 June 2009 Linares made his first defense against former Mexico lightweight champion Josafat Perez (12–1, 7 KOs), who was moving down in weight, in Mexico. Linares retained the title following an over right to the head of Perez which floored him. Perez beat the count and carried on with unsteady legs. The fight went on. Following some fast combinations from Linares, Perez stumbled backwards and referee Luis Pabon intervened to stop the fight. The time of stoppage was 1 minute 40 seconds into round 8.

Linares signed a contract with the Golden Boy Promotions in September 2009 whilst still remaining Teiken Promotions.

==== Linares vs. Salgado ====
On 10 October 2009 Linares traveled back to Japan to make a second defense at the Yoyogi #2 Gymnasium in Tokyo against unbeaten 24 year old Mexican boxer Juan Carlos Salgado (20-0-1, 14 KOs). Linares lost his WBA super featherweight title and his unbeaten streak after being knocked out in round one. Salgado came forward aggressively at the opening bell and knocked Linares down with a powerful left hook. Linares got back up, only to be attacked straight away with a barrage of left and right jabs to the head and body flooring him again, prompting the stoppage. The defeat was named Ring Magazine's 2009 Upset of the Year.

Linares took five months out before returning to Venezuela defeating 38 year old former interim WBC super featherweight champion Francisco Lorenzo in a scheduled 10 round bout via majority decision. The judges scored the fight 97-93, 97-94 and 95-95.

=== Lightweight ===
==== Linares vs. Juarez ====
In his second professional fight in the United States on 31 July 2010, Linares fought on the Juan Manuel Marquez-Juan Diaz II pay-per-view undercard at the Mandalay Bay Resort & Casino in Las Vegas and comfortably defeated Mexican-American boxer, five time world title challenger Rocky Juarez (28-6-1, 20 KOs) by unanimous decision. Linares scored a knockdown in round five. Judge Al Lefkowitz scored the fight 97-92, Dave Moretti and Richard Ocasio both scored the fight 99-90 in favor of Linares. Linares claimed the interim WBA Fedelatin lightweight title.

Linares defeated Mexico's Adrian Verdugo by a technical knockout in the seventh round of a ten-round lightweight bout in Mazatlán, Sinaloa, Mexico, on 28 May 2011. After that fight, Linares has trained with Freddie Roach at Wild Card Boxing Club in Hollywood, along with the U.S. Olympic boxing team in Colorado Springs, Colorado, and served as Manny Pacquiao’s sparring partner in Baguio in the Philippines.

==== Linares vs. DeMarco ====
Linares fought for the vacant WBC lightweight title against Antonio DeMarco at the Staples Center on 15 October 2011. He outlanded DeMarco 216 to 97 in overall punches landed, but lost by TKO after suffering a major cut on his nose eventually allowing DeMarco to begin pounding on it, forcing the referee to stop the fight in the eleventh round. In addition to his own wish, Golden Boy Promotions and Teiken Promotions appealed to the WBC for a rematch.

A rematch with DeMarco had been scheduled ahead of time to take place at the Home Depot Center on 7 July. However, Linares lost to Sergio Thompson in a WBC Lightweight title eliminator via a second round stoppage in Cancun, Mexico on 31 March 2012.

Linares faced Jorge Francisco Contreras on 10 November 2013, sensationally knocking out Contreras in the first round.

==== Linares vs. Arakawa ====
Following four consecutive wins, Linares was lined up to fight former Japanese lightweight champion Nihito Arakawa (24-3-1, 16 KOs) in a WBC lightweight title eliminator. The fight took place on the undercard of Canelo Álvarez vs. Alfredo Angulo at the MGM Grand Garden Arena on 8 March 2014. In the early rounds, Linares used his head and foot movement along with his superior boxing skills. The fight was full of back and forth action throughout, with an accidental clash of heads which opened up a cut to Linares' left eye. The fight went the 10 round distance as judges Tim Cheatham and Bill Lerch scored the fight a shutout 100-90 in favour of Linares. Judge Richard Houck scored the bout 98-92 for Linares.

Linares fought on the Shawn Porter vs. Kell Brook undercard at the StubHub Center in Carson, California in a stay busy fight on 16 August against journeyman Ira Terry (26–11, 16 KOs). Linares won via a 2nd-round knockout. The end came when Linares hit Terry with a left hook, which staggered him, followed by a right hand to the cheekbone. Without counting, the referee waived the fight off.

==== Linares vs. Prieto ====
On 10 November 2014 the WBC ordered Linares to fight their Silver lightweight champion and contender Javier Prieto (24-7-2, 18 KOs) for the vacant WBC lightweight title. The winner would then need to fight Omar Figueroa Jr., who was granted Interim status and named 'Champion in recess' after suffering an injury in his last fight. The bout was scheduled to take on Tuesday, 30 December 2014 in Tokyo at the Metropolitan Gym. Linares became the youngest Venezuelan to win a world title in three different weight divisions at the age of 29 and only the second from Venezuela after Leo Gamez, who was a four-division world champion, when he knocked Prieto out in four rounds to claim the WBC title in his second attempt. The end came when Linares connected with an overhand right to the side of Prieto's head, knocking him down and out.

==== Linares vs. Mitchell ====
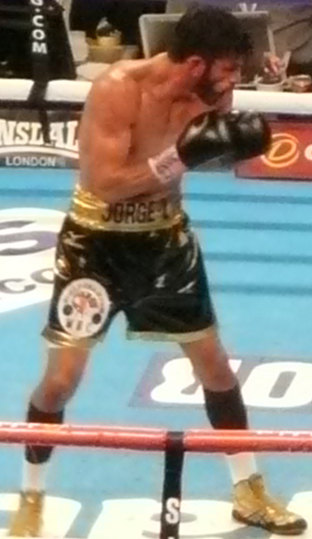
Linares vs. Mitchell, 2015

British lightweight contender Kevin Mitchell (39–2, 29 KOs) attempted to win a world title in his third attempt when he challenged Linares for his WBC title. The fight took place on 3 May 2015 at the O2 Arena in London live on Sky Box Office PPV. The fight was officially announced on 19 March by Eddie Hearn. He said, "This is a huge night for British boxing, and today's announcement is just the beginning. I'm delighted to deliver shots for Kevin and Lee in the U.K. and they have every chance of becoming world champions on May 30." Other bouts on the card included Kell Brook's IBF welterweight title defence against Frankie Gavin and Lee Selby challenging for his first world title against IBF featherweight champion Evgeny Gradovich. It was the first time Linares fought in the UK.

Linares was dropped in round five but went on to retain his world title in round 10 via technical knockout. Mitchell was badly cut above the left eye which closed up. Mitchell was dropped in the tenth before the referee stopped the bout. The cut was due to a clash of heads in round four, which also opened a cut on the side of Linares' head. At the time of stoppage, Mitchell was ahead on two of the judges scorecards at 82–88 and 84–86. The third judge had it even at 85–85.

==== Linares vs. Cano ====
Linares traveled back to his home country Venezuela for only the fourth time in his 12-year professional career and first time since 2010, to make a voluntary defence against 27 year old Mexican contender Ivan Cano (23-6-2, 15 KOs) at the El Poliedro in Caracas on October 10, 2015. It was also the first time Linares had a world title fight in Venezuela. Linares knocked Cano out in round four to retain his WBC title. Cano was also down in round three of this one sided fight.

==== Negotiations with Zlatičanin ====
Linares' next fight was scheduled to be against unbeaten mandatory Dejan Zlatičanin (21–0, 14 KO). Terms where agreed on January 8, 2016, for a fight to take place. This was also the day of the purse bids. A date in April was discussed for the fight. In February, Golden Boy Promotions revealed that Linares would have to withdraw from the fight due to a fracture in his right hand. There was talk that WBC president Mauricio Sulaiman would name Linares as Champion in recess and have Zlatičanin fight next available challenger, 39 year old Italian boxer Emiliano Marsili (32-0-1, 14 KOs), where Linares would have the option to the fight the winner upon his return. Linares was later stripped of the title, but made aware he had the option to fight for the belt when his hand injury had healed.

==== Linares vs. Crolla I, II ====
On 15 June 2016 it was announced on Sky Sports that a deal had been made for Linares to challenge WBA lightweight champion Anthony Crolla (31-4-3, 13 KOs) on 24 September at the Manchester Arena in Manchester. This was the second time Linares fought in the UK and the first time in Manchester. Linares won the WBA lightweight title and claimed the vacant The Ring Magazine and WBC Diamond title after winning the bout via unanimous decision. Two judges scored it close at 115-114 and 115-113. The third judge had it more wide at 117-111, all in favour of Linares. Linares' unique style, hand speed and power punches seemed to conquer Crolla's tactics of pressure fighting. Immediately after the fight, Linares offered Crolla a chance of a rematch, "I want to tell all the people thank you very much. We gave Manchester a beautiful fight and we can do it again."

On 6 October 2016 WBC ordered negotiations to begin between Linares and WBC titleholder Zlatičanin, which no deadlines in place. A doctors report revealed that Linares had hurt his right hand during the Crolla fight and wouldn't be returning to the ring in the near future. Due to that reason, the WBC allowed Zlatičanin to make a voluntary defence.

Reports in early December suggested a rematch could possibly take place in Manchester on 25 March 2017. The winner of the rematch would then be ordered to fight the winner of the Dejan Zlatičanin vs. Mikey Garcia, due to take place January, which was won by Garcia, in a unification fight. All three titles would be at stake in the rematch, with Eddie Hearn due to make an announcement in 2017. An official announcement was made on 4 January 2017 for the fight take place at the Manchester Arena in Manchester, a city which Linares said was open to returning to. The WBA, WBC Diamond and The Ring magazine world lightweight titles would be at stake. The fight was televised live on Sky Sports in the UK and on 24 January, Showtime announced they would cover the fight in the United States. Both fighters weighed in at 134.4 pounds.

On fight night, in front of 13,000 fans, Linares dropped Crolla in the seventh round with a left uppercut, and went the distance to win by wider margins (118–109 on all three scorecards) than the first fight. Crolla started off well hitting to body, but Linares quickly capitalized and started connected well to the body and landing combinations of uppercuts. Linares put in a more solid and dominant performance than their first encounter. At the end of round 11, Crolla's trainer Joe Gallagher came into the ring and walked towards referee Howard John Foster, possibly to stop the fight. After Crolla pleaded with him, Gallagher allowed him to go the distance. With the win, Linares retained the WBA, The Ring and WBC Diamond lightweight titles.

In the post-fight interview, he thanked his promoter Oscar De Le Hoya for making the trip and watching him ringside and said his next move would be a big pay day in Las Vegas against WBC lightweight champion Mikey Garcia. Crolla apologized to the live attendance, admitted he lost to the better man and said he would be back to rebuild, "Manchester, I am so sorry I couldn't do it for you. Your support means so much to me. He caught me but before that I thought I could get to him. I got beaten by the better man - no excuses. I am 30 years old, I am going to rest, but I believe I can go again." Both fighters embraced at the final bell and showed respect. Crolla meditated around moving up to super lightweight. This was the first time Crolla had lost consecutive fights and losing to the same opponent twice after his losses to Gary Sykes in 2009 and 2012.

==== Linares vs. Campbell ====
Golden Boy Promotions matchmaker, Robert Diaz, announced that Linares would next fight on 23 September 2017 and ruled out WBC Silver titlist Luke Campbell as his opponent. The plan being to have Campbell to fight on the undercard. If both fighters win their respected bouts, they would meet in the future. Linares reportedly moved to London with his wife and kids and was said to start his training camp with trainer Ismael Salas. On 21 July 2017 the WBA ordered Linares to make a mandatory defence against Luke Campbell (17–1, 14 KOs). As per WBA rules, a titleholder must fight a mandatory within 9 months, this time would expire on 23 July, having won the title from Crolla in September 2016. Campbell became the mandatory challenger when he stopped former interim world champion Darleys Pérez in April 2017. Both sides were given 30 days to come to an agreement for the fight. On 27 July a deal was reached for Linares and Campbell to fight at The Forum in Inglewood, California, on 23 September 2017. The bout will be shown live on Sky Sports in the United Kingdom and on HBO: Boxing After Dark in the United States. In an interview, Linares said, “I am excited to make my return to the US and to headline a HBO show for the first time. I know Campbell is a tough [...] I am confident that I will emerge victorious on September 23rd.” This fight would mark the second time Campbell fights professionally in California. Linares wishes to continue being on the main event HBO boxing card and continue with big fights.

In front of 4,125, Linares won his 12th straight fight, retaining his WBA world title after 12 rounds against Campbell. One judge scored the fight 115-113 for Campbell, the remaining two had it 115-112 and 114-113 in favour of Linares, giving him the split decision win. ESPN.com also scored the fight 115-112 for Linares. Linares dropped Campbell with a straight right hand to the head in round 2. Between rounds 5 to 9, Campbell took control of the fight. Linares later told HBO that he wanted to reduce his amount of offense so that he wouldn't get hurt. Once the championship rounds started, Linares regained control of the fight. Had Campbell not been dropped early in the fight, the verdict would have been a split decision draw. Due to Linares taking his foot off the gas, it prevented him from winning the fight with wider margins.

Campbell believed he won the fight, speaking to Max Kellerman he said, “I thought I won the fight. He’s a great champion, but I thought I out-classed him. I didn't think he was landing any shots whatsoever, and I was catching him with all the clean shots.” Linares praised Campbell for his efforts, “He was a tough opponent. Many people said he was very easy, but it’s not for no reason he’s an Olympic champion. I fought very well all the way to the 12th round. And I think in the fifth round, I started to box him a little bit because I didn't wanna get hurt.” Linares looked for the knockout in the final two rounds, but realized he would have to settle for a points decision. When asked who he would like to fight next, Linares said, "Mikey Garcia at 135. If we need to go to 140, we'll go to 140." CompuBox stats showed Linares landed 140 of 414 thrown (34%) , while Campbell was credited to landing 141 of his 524 thrown (27%). The fight drew an average of 687,000 viewers and peaked at 726,000 viewers on HBO.

==== Linares vs. Gesta ====
On 5 October the WBC ordered a fight between Mikey Garcia (37–0, 30 KOs) and Linares, as Linares holds the WBC Diamond title, making him the mandatory. Garcia commented on Twitter that a potential Cotto fight couldn't happen as Golden Boy Promotions required him signing an exclusive long-term contract with them in order to make the fight. Garcia also mentioned that the fight with Linares wouldn't happen before the end of the year as Linares was unavailable on December. Eric Gomez, president of Golden Boy sent out a message to Garcia stating if he wanted the fight with Linares, it could be made, without any add-ons to the contract. Garcia later replied, "No need to put it out [in] public. You also have my number, I'll call you later bro." Gomez later announced that Garcia had rejected their offer for the fight with Linares, despite Golden Boy meeting his terms. Garcia said he had received a more lucrative offer. He said, "I have more options, in fact [...] the guaranteed purse is better [...] just as Golden Boy is looking to do what's best for their company, I am also looking to do what's best for me." Gomez stated that Eddie Hearn had offered good money to get Linares back in the UK for a rematch with Luke Campbell.

On 27 November Golden Boy Promotions announced a double-header which would kick off 2018, with Linares headlining the card, defending his WBA and The Ring Magazine titles against Filipino boxer Mercito "No Mercy" Gesta (31-1-2, 17 KOs). The fight would take place at The Forum in Inglewood in January 2018. The co-main event would see Lucas Matthysse vs. Tewa Kiram for the WBA 'Regular' title. It was reported the card would air live on HBO: Boxing After Dark. In front of 6,143 at the Forum, Linares outclassed Gesta in handing him a defeat by a 12-round unanimous decision and also retained his world titles. The official judges scores were 118-110, 117-110 and 118-110. Gesta, although out worked still gave a good effort and remained in the fight. He started to let his hands go more in the championship rounds when Linares appeared to slow down. Throughout the fight, Linares was able to counter Gesta and land 4 and 5 punch combinations. After the fight, Linares said, "I didn't really feel his power. But I hurt my hand in the fourth or fifth round." In round 8, Linares suffered a cut early over his right eye and bled until the round ended. His corner were able to control the cut and it did not bother him for the remainder of the fight. CompuBox showed that Linares landed 171 out of 585 punches thrown (29%) and Gesta landed 120 of his 515 punches thrown (23%). In the post-fight presser, Linares named Mikey Garcia and Vasiliy Lomachenko as potential opponents, "You know what's nice? That people mention my name. That's fine that they mention my name. Let them get in the ring with me."

==== Linares vs. Lomachenko ====
On 30 January Top Rank's Bob Arum told ESPN that negotiations had begun in December 2017 for a fight between two-weight world champion Vasiliy Lomachenko (10–1, 8 KOs) and Linares after speaking to Teiken Promotions, Linares' lead promoter, with the fight to take place on either 28 April or 12 May 2018. The fight would main event an ESPN card. Arum was pushing for the fight to take place at Madison Square Garden on 12 May 2018. The reason behind the date was explained by Arum, "May 12th is an extraordinarily important date for ESPN programming. It's right in the middle of the basketball playoffs." Carl Moretti called Eric Gomez of Golden Boy informing them of the date. Gomez stated they were happy with the fight, however the date of 12 May was not a good date for them, as they already had plans for that date. HBO would likely air the pay-per-view replay of Gennady Golovkin vs. Canelo Álvarez rematch, along with a live bout. On 17 February Gomez stated the fight was not called off and Arum would need to be more flexible with the date as Golden Boy accepted Arum's terms that the fight would take place in New York. On 13 March, Los Angeles Times confirmed that terms had been agreed between both sides. The agreement was reached after ESPN agreed to televise the fight at 8 p.m. ET/5 p.m. PT, so it would broadcast before HBO's telecast on the same day. Madison Square Garden in New York City was confirmed as the venue. On 21 March the fight was officially announced. On 28 March Linares' trainer Ismael Salas stated that he would likely not be in his corner for the fight due to scheduling conflicts. Salas was in London at the time training David Haye for his rematch with Tony Bellew, which would take place a week before on 5 May. Linares later stated that veteran Rudy Hernandez would lead his corner. Both boxers weighed in 134.6 pounds.

In front of 10,429 in attendance, Lomachenko survived a knockdown in round 6 to win via TKO in round 10 after a perfectly placed liver shot to claim the WBA (Super) and The Ring lightweight titles. In doing so he became the fastest fighter ever to win titles in 3 different weight classes (only 12 professional fights) shattering the previous record of 20 fights, which was held by Jeff Fenech. Lomachenko wore Linares down with his fast shots through the first 9 rounds, before finishing the fight in round 10. Linares slowly beat the count but looked too hurt to continue. Referee Ricky Gonzalez stopped the fight at 2 minutes, 8 seconds of round 10. The loss snapped Linares' 13-fight win streak. At the time of stoppage, two judges had each fighter ahead 86-84 on their respective scorecards and the third judge Julie Lederman had it 85-85 even. After the fight, Lomachenko said, "It was a great fight. That right hand [that knocked me down], it was a great punch. It happens. I prepared for the last few rounds, and my father [and trainer Anatoly Lomachenko] told me, 'You need to go to the body.' Linares is a great champion, and the fight was good for the fans and everybody." Speaking of the knockout punch, Linares said it was 'perfectly landed.' De La Hoya also congratulated Arum on the fight and told Arum it was good experience working together. According to CompuBox Stats, Linares landed 207 of 739 punches thrown (28%), this included 139 power punches landed and a total amount of 77 body shots landed. Lomachenko landed 213 of 627 punches thrown (34%), with 112 jabs. For the fight, Linares was paid a career high $1 million, with Lomachenko receiving a $1.2 million purse. The card averaged 1,024,00 viewers. The fight itself averaged 1,439,000 viewers and peaked at 1,749,000 viewers, making it the most-watched boxing fight on cable television in 2018.

=== Light welterweight ===
==== Linares vs. Cotto ====
On 29 August 2018 Golden Boy announced that Linares would return to the ring, campaigning at light welterweight. The fight was confirmed to be the taking place at Fantasy Springs Resort Casino in Indio, California, on 29 September against Abner Cotto (23–3, 12 KOs) in a 12-round bout. In the US, the fight will be streamed live on Facebook Watch and globally on the Golden Boy Fight Night Page. Linares won the bout via KO in round 3. Linares dropped Cotto with a right hand to the head in round 2. In round 3, Linares knocked Cotto down with a hard right hand. Cotto was dropped again moments later, but dragged Linares down in the process. After getting up, Cotto was badly hurt. Referee Raul Caiz Sr. quickly stopped the fight. The official time of the stoppage was a 1:31 of round 3. Linares showed he was able to carry his power up in weight. In the post fight interview, Linares said, "It's my first fight with Facebook and I'm so happy with that. I'm ready, I'm happy. I feel better and better at 140. I'm ready for the big fights. I want to fight the best at 140." Linares said he would go back down to lightweight for a rematch against Lomachenko or to fight Mikey Garcia. Linares landed 58 of 132 shots (44%) while Cotto landed only 20 of 103 punches (19%). In round 3 alone, Linares landed 18 of 25 power shots.

In October 2018, the WBC stated they would likely order Linares to fight Adrien Broner (33-3-1, 24 KOs) in a final eliminator, as long as they abide by the code of ethics. The fight was put in doubt after it was announced that Broner would fight former eight-division world champion Manny Pacquiao in January 2019.

==== Linares vs. Cano ====
In early December 2018, it was reported that Matchroom promoter Eddie Hearn was looking to match WBO light welterweight champion Maurice Hooker (25-0-1, 19 KOs) with more credible opponents in 2019. Hearn planned for Chris Algieri and Linares fight in separate bouts on his 18 January 2019 DAZN card. DAZN announced Linares would fight 29 year old veteran Pablo César Cano (31–7–1, 21 KOs) on the card, which would take place at the Hulu Theater in New York City. Linares lost on a first round technical knockout.

=== Move back down to lightweight ===
==== Linares vs. Toyogon ====
On August 16, 2019, the Teiken Boxing Gym announced that Lineres would face Al Toyogon in a ten round bout on September 7, 2019. Linares won the fight convincingly via unanimous decision, 100–89, 100–90 and 99–90.

==== Linares vs. Morales ====
In his next fight, Linares faced Carlos Morales. Linares dropped his opponent twice en route to a fourth-round KO win.

==== Linares vs. Haney ====
In his first world title fight since facing Vasiliy Lomachenko in 2018, Linares challenged for Devin Haney's WBC lightweight title on 29 May 2021 in Paradise, Nevada. Haney controlled the action for most of the fight, but was hurt when Linares caught him with a powerful right-left combination toward the end of the tenth round. Haney survived the final two rounds largely by tying Linares up and negating the latter's attempts at trying to engage with him. Haney was awarded a unanimous decision with scores of 116–112, 116–112, 115–113, handing Linares the first decision loss of his professional career.

==== Linares vs. Abdullaev ====
Linares was booked to challenge the reigning WBC Silver lightweight champion Zaur Abdullaev on February 19, 2022. The bout was scheduled as the main event of an ESPN and Match TV broadcast card, that took place at the RCC Boxing Academy in Yekaterinburg, Russia. Despite a strong start, Linares began to fade as the fight went on, before eventually losing the fight by a twelfth-round technical knockout. He was knocked down twice, before being stopped with a flurry of punches at the 2:28 minute mark of the last round.

Linares announced his retirement from professional boxing on Sunday, October 22, 2023.

== Professional boxing record ==
56 fights	47 wins	9 losses
By knockout	29	6
By decision	18	3

No.	Result	Record	Opponent	Type	Round, time	Date	Location	Notes
56	Loss	47–9	Jack Catterall	UD	12	21 Oct 2023	M&S Bank Arena, Liverpool, England	
55	Loss	47–8	Zhora Hamazaryan	UD	10	11 Dec 2022	DIVS, Ekaterinburg, Russia	
54	Loss	47–7	Zaur Abdullaev	TKO	12 (12), 2:55	19 Feb 2022	RCC Boxing Academy, Ekaterinburg, Russia	For WBC Silver lightweight title
53	Loss	47–6	Devin Haney	UD	12	29 May 2021	Michelob Ultra Arena, Paradise, Nevada, U.S.	For WBC lightweight title
52	Win	47–5	Carlos Morales	KO	4 (12), 2:09	14 Feb 2020	Honda Center, Anaheim, California, U.S.	
51	Win	46–5	Al Toyogon	UD	10	7 Sep 2019	Korakuen Hall, Tokyo, Japan	
50	Loss	45–5	Pablo César Cano	TKO	1 (12), 2:48	18 Jan 2019	Hulu Theater, New York City, New York, U.S.	For WBC Silver International super lightweight title
49	Win	45–4	Abner Cotto	KO	3 (12), 1:31	29 Sep 2018	Fantasy Springs Resort Casino, Indio, California, U.S.	
48	Loss	44–4	Vasiliy Lomachenko	TKO	10 (12), 2:08	12 May 2018	Madison Square Garden, New York City, New York, U.S.	Lost WBA and The Ring lightweight titles
47	Win	44–3	Mercito Gesta	UD	12	27 Jan 2018	The Forum, Inglewood, California, U.S.	Retained WBA and The Ring lightweight titles
46	Win	43–3	Luke Campbell	SD	12	23 Sep 2017	The Forum, Inglewood, California, U.S.	Retained WBA and The Ring lightweight titles
45	Win	42–3	Anthony Crolla	UD	12	25 Mar 2017	Manchester Arena, Manchester, England	Retained WBA an The Ring lightweight titles
44	Win	41–3	Anthony Crolla	UD	12	24 Sep 2016	Manchester Arena, Manchester, England	Won WBA and vacant The Ring lightweight titles
43	Win	40–3	Ivan Cano	KO	4 (12), 0:58	10 Oct 2015	Poliedro, Caracas, Venezuela	Retained WBC lightweight title
42	Win	39–3	Kevin Mitchell	TKO	10 (12), 2:57	30 May 2015	The O2 Arena, London, England	Retained WBC lightweight title
41	Win	38–3	Javier Prieto	KO	4 (12), 1:50	30 Dec 2014	Metropolitan Gymnasium, Tokyo, Japan	Won vacant WBC lightweight title
40	Win	37–3	Ira Terry	KO	2 (8), 1:21	16 Aug 2014	StubHub Center, Carson, California, U.S.	
39	Win	36–3	Nihito Arakawa	UD	10	8 Mar 2014	MGM Grand Garden Arena, Paradise, Nevada, U.S.	
38	Win	35–3	Francisco Contreras	TKO	1 (10), 3:08	10 Nov 2013	Ryōgoku Kokugikan, Tokyo, Japan	
37	Win	34–3	Berman Sanchez	TKO	3 (10), 1:09	25 Aug 2013	Ariake Coliseum, Tokyo, Japan	
36	Win	33–3	David Rodela	TKO	8 (10), 2:51	16 Mar 2013	Grand Oasis, Cancún, Mexico	
35	Win	32–3	Héctor Velázquez	UD	10	6 Oct 2012	Memorial Auditorium, Sacramento, California, U.S.	
34	Loss	31–3	Sergio Thompson	TKO	2 (12), 2:27	31 Mar 2012	Grand Oasis, Cancún, Mexico	
33	Loss	31–2	Antonio DeMarco	TKO	11 (12), 2:32	15 Oct 2011	Staples Center, Los Angeles, California, U.S.	For vacant WBC lightweight title
32	Win	31–1	Adrian Verdugo	TKO	7 (10), 1:49	28 May 2011	Mazatlan International Center, Mazatlán, Mexico	
31	Win	30–1	Jesús Chávez	RTD	4 (12), 3:00	24 Oct 2010	Ryōgoku Kokugikan, Tokyo, Japan	
30	Win	29–1	Rocky Juarez	UD	10	31 Jul 2010	Mandalay Bay Events Center, Paradise, Nevada, U.S.	Won WBA Fedelatin interim lightweight title
29	Win	28–1	Francisco Lorenzo	MD	10	27 Mar 2010	Polideportivo José María Vargas, La Guaira, Venezuela	
28	Loss	27–1	Juan Carlos Salgado	TKO	1 (12), 1:13	10 Oct 2009	Yoyogi National Gymnasium, Tokyo, Japan	Lost WBA super featherweight title
27	Win	27–0	Josafat Perez	TKO	8 (12), 1:40	27 Jun 2009	Plaza de Toros, Nuevo Laredo, Mexico	Retained WBA super featherweight title
26	Win	26–0	Whyber Garcia	TKO	5 (12), 1:08	28 Nov 2008	Atlapa Convention Centre, Panama City, Panama	Won vacant WBA super featherweight title
25	Win	25–0	Gamaliel Díaz	KO	8 (12), 2:02	15 Dec 2007	Plaza de Toros, Cancún, Mexico	Retained WBC featherweight title
24	Win	24–0	Óscar Larios	TKO	10 (12), 2:37	21 Jul 2007	Mandalay Bay Events Center, Paradise, Nevada, U.S.	Won vacant WBC interim featherweight title
23	Win	23–0	Ramiro Lara	TKO	3 (10), 1:37	3 Feb 2007	Korakuen Hall, Tokyo, Japan	
22	Win	22–0	Humberto Martinez	TKO	6 (10), 2:34	7 Oct 2006	Korakuen Hall, Tokyo, Japan	
21	Win	21–0	Pedro Navarrete	UD	10	3 Jun 2006	Korakuen Hall, Tokyo, Japan	
20	Win	20–0	Saohin Srithai Condo	UD	10	1 Apr 2006	Korakuen Hall, Tokyo, Japan	
19	Win	19–0	Jeffrey Onate	KO	1 (10), 1:59	7 Jan 2006	Korakuen Hall, Tokyo, Japan	
18	Win	18–0	Denchai Sor Tiebkoon	TKO	1 (10), 2:30	3 Nov 2005	Seoul, South Korea	
17	Win	17–0	Ayon Naranjo	UD	6	25 Sep 2005	Yokohama Arena, Yokohama, Japan	
16	Win	16–0	Jesus Perez	RTD	4 (10), 3:00	13 Aug 2005	Circulo Militar, Maracay, Venezuela	
15	Win	15–0	Jean Javier Sotelo	TKO	2 (10), 1:56	26 May 2005	Estadio Luna Park, Buenos Aires, Argentina	Won vacant WBA Fedecentro featherweight title
14	Win	14–0	Luis Perez Vicente	KO	4 (6), 1:49	16 Apr 2005	Nippon Budokan, Tokyo, Japan	
13	Win	13–0	Melvin Ayudtud	KO	1 (10), 2:07	5 Feb 2005	Korakuen Hall, Tokyo, Japan	
12	Win	12–0	Rafael Castillo	TKO	4 (8), 2:16	3 Dec 2004	Figali Convention Center, Panama City, Panama	
11	Win	11–0	Sung-Hoon Park	KO	1 (10), 2:42	2 Oct 2004	Korakuen Hall, Tokyo, Japan	
10	Win	10–0	Renan Acosta	UD	10	7 Aug 2004	Korakuen Hall, Tokyo, Japan	Won vacant WBA Fedelatin featherweight title
9	Win	9–0	Michael Domingo	UD	10	1 May 2004	Korakuen Hall, Tokyo, Japan	
8	Win	8–0	Hugo Rafael Soto	UD	10	31 Jan 2004	Poliedro, Caracas, Venezuela	Won vacant WBA Fedelatin super bantamweight title
7	Win	7–0	Pederito Laurente	UD	10	18 Oct 2003	Korakuen Hall, Tokyo, Japan	
6	Win	6–0	Jung-Keun Woo	KO	2 (8), 2:12	20 Sep 2003	Korakuen Hall, Tokyo, Japan	
5	Win	5–0	Thunder Ito	TKO	3 (10), 2:44	12 Jul 2003	Pacifico, Yokohama, Japan	
4	Win	4–0	Ariel Austria	UD	8	19 Apr 2003	Korakuen Hall, Tokyo, Japan	
3	Win	3–0	Singdam Monsaichon	KO	3 (8), 1:02	15 Mar 2003	Korakuen Hall, Tokyo, Japan	
2	Win	2–0	Chawal Sor Vorapin	UD	6	15 Feb 2003	Korakuen Hall, Tokyo, Japan	
1	Win	1–0	Kyong-Soo Chung	KO	1 (6), 0:45	15 Dec 2002	Prefectural Gymnasium, Osaka, Japan	

== Titles in boxing ==
=== Major world titles ===
- WBC featherweight champion (126 lbs)
- WBA super featherweight champion (130 lbs)
- WBA lightweight champion (135 lbs)
- WBC lightweight champion (135 lbs)

=== The Ring magazine titles ===
- The Ring lightweight champion (135 lbs)

=== Interim world titles ===
- WBC interim featherweight champion (126 lbs)

=== Regional/International titles ===
- WBA Fedelatin super bantamweight champion (122 lbs)
- WBA Fedelatin featherweight champion (126 lbs)
- WBA Fedecentro featherweight champion (126 lbs)

=== Interim regional titles ===
- WBA Fedelatin interim lightweight champion (135 lbs)

=== Honorary titles ===
- WBC Diamond lightweight champion

== Personal life ==
On November 15, 2026, Linares was detained by Immigration and Customs Enforcement (ICE) agents at El Paso International Airport after flying there from Miami to attend a boxing event. ICE alleged Linares had entered the country in October 2023 but had overstayed his visa. As of November 18, he is being held at El Paso Processing Center.

== See also ==
- List of boxing triple champions
- Devin Haney
- Vasiliy Lomachenko

Sporting positions
Regional boxing titles
Vacant Title last held by Jose Rojas	WBA Fedelatin super bantamweight champion 31 January 2004 – May 2004; Vacated	Vacant Title next held by Sergio Manuel Medina
Vacant Title last held by Jose Pablo Estrella	WBA Fedelatin featherweight champion 7 August 2004 – October 2004; Vacated	Vacant Title next held by Whyber Garcia
Vacant Title last held by Jorge Solís	WBA Fedecentro featherweight champion 26 May 2005 – August 2005; Vacated	Vacant Title next held by Gabriel Dorado
Vacant Title last held by Ammeth Diaz	WBA Fedelatin lightweight champion Interim title 31 July 2010 – October 2010; Vacated	Vacant Title next held by Ismael Barroso
World boxing titles
Vacant Title last held by Humberto Soto	WBC featherweight champion Interim title 21 July 2007– 31 July 2007; Promoted	Vacant Title next held by Óscar Larios
Vacant Title last held by Chi In-jin	WBC featherweight champion 31 July 2007 – 13 August 2008; Vacated	Succeeded by Óscar Larios awarded title
Vacant Title last held by Edwin Valero	WBA super featherweight champion 28 November 2008 – 10 October 2009	Succeeded by Juan Carlos Salgado
Vacant Title last held by Omar Figueroa Jr.	WBC lightweight champion 30 December 2014 – 23 February 2016; Status changed	Vacant Title next held by Dejan Zlatičanin
Preceded by Anthony Crolla	WBA lightweight champion 24 September 2016 – 12 May 2018; Lost bid for Super title	Succeeded by Vasiliy Lomachenko as Super champion
Vacant Title last held by Terence Crawford	The Ring lightweight champion 24 September 2016 – 12 May 2018	Succeeded by Vasiliy Lomachenko
Honorary boxing titles
Vacant Title last held by Omar Figueroa Jr.	WBC lightweight champion In recess 23 February 2016 – 24 September 2016; Vacated	Vacant Title next held by Devin Haney
