= Jorge Linares vs. Luke Campbell =

Boxing match

- Date: 23 September 2017
- Venue: The Forum, Inglewood, California, U.S.
- Title(s) on the line: WBA and The Ring lightweight titles

Tale of the tape
Boxer	Jorge Linares	Luke Campbell
Nickname	"El Niño de Oro"	"Cool Hand"
Hometown	Barinas, Barinas, Venezuela	Kingston upon Hull, East Riding of Yorkshire, UK
Pre-fight record	42–3 (27 KO)	17–1 (14 KO)
Age	32 years, 1 month	29 years, 11 months
Height	5 ft 7 in (170 cm)	5 ft 9 in (175 cm)
Weight	134 1/4 lb (61 kg)	134 3/4 lb (61 kg)
Style	Orthodox	Southpaw
Recognition	WBA and The Ring; Lightweight Champion; TBRB; No. 2 Ranked Lightweight; 3-division world champion	WBA; No. 1 Ranked Lightweight

Result
- Linares defeats Campbell by split decision

Jorge Linares vs. Luke Campbell was a professional boxing match contested on 23 September 2017, for the WBA and The Ring lightweight championship.

== Background ==
In July 2017 Golden Boy Promotions' matchmaker, Robert Diaz, announced that Linares would next fight on 23 September and ruled out a return to Britain to face Luke Campbell. The plan being to have Campbell to fight on the undercard and if both fighters won their respected bouts, they would meet in the future. However on 21 July the WBA ordered Linares to make a mandatory defence against Campbell as per WBA rules, a titleholder must fight a mandatory within 9 months, this time would expire on 23 July, with Linares having won the title from Crolla in September 2016. Campbell became the mandatory challenger when he stopped former interim world champion Darleys Pérez in April 2017. Both sides were given 30 days to come to an agreement for the fight.

On 27 July a deal was reached for Linares and Campbell to fight at The Forum in Inglewood, California, U.S. on 23 September. The bout would be shown as part of HBO: Boxing After Dark in the United States. In an interview, Linares said, “I am excited to make my return to the US and to headline a HBO show for the first time. I know Campbell is a tough [...] I am confident that I will emerge victorious on September 23rd.” This bout would mark the second time Campbell had fought professionally in California having beaten Steve Trumble on the Shawn Porter vs. Kell Brook undercard in August 2014.

During the build up Linares expressed the wish to continue to be involved in big fights saying "I'm in the prime of my career. I think Luke Campbell is the best opponent for me, besides Mikey Garcia... I love the idea of once again returning to the American boxing market. I want the big fights. I want to fight with the best. I am past the fight with Anthony Crolla, and now I want the best. Mikey Garcia. [Vasyl] Lomachenko. I am ready for everybody,".

Campbell meanwhile insisted he would bring a "different game" to Crolla telling BBC Sport "Linares is a great champion but I feel this is the time. I am happy to be the underdog. I'm on this stage where the world will see how good I am. If anything I feel less pressured. When you have your home crowd it can sometimes add pressure to you. It's a fantastic way to introduce myself to the American market and this is my opportunity to show what I've got." However many pundits predicted that the Brit would struggle to beat Linares with BBC Radio 5 Live boxing analyst Steve Bunce saying "In 2008 Luke was the first English boxer to win a European title in 47 years but Linares is a respected quantity. Lots people feel he has one of the best styles out there. I love watching him. It doesn't matter which way you look at it, I'm really struggling to build a case for Luke Campbell. It's an odd fight. I understand Luke may have been pushing his promoter for a world title fight as he has a good ranking. It's a tough one. It seems harsh but I'm really struggling. I hope I'm wrong."

Linares was the 1/5 favourite to win.

== The fight ==
Linares dropped Campbell with a straight right hand to the head in round 2. Between rounds 5 to 9, Campbell took control of the fight. Linares later told HBO that he wanted to reduce his amount of offense so that he wouldn't get hurt. Once the championship rounds started, Linares regained control of the fight. Had Campbell not been dropped early in the fight, the verdict would have been a split decision draw. Due to Linares taking his foot off the gas, it prevented him from winning the fight with wider margins. At the end of 12 rounds, one judge scored the fight 115–113 for Campbell, the remaining two had it 115–112 and 114–113 in favour of Linares, giving him the split decision victory.

ESPN also scored the fight 115–112 for Linares. HBO's unofficial ringside scorer Harold Lederman scored the fight 116–111 for Linares.

CompuBox stats showed Linares landed 140 of 414 thrown (33.8%), while Campbell was credited to landing 141 of his 524 thrown (26.9%).

== Aftermath ==
Speaking after the bout Linares praised Campbell for his efforts, "He was a tough opponent. Many people said he was very easy, but it’s not for no reason he’s an Olympic champion. I fought very well all the way to the 12th round. And I think in the fifth round, I started to box him a little bit because I didn't wanna get hurt." When asked who he would like to fight next, Linares said, "Mikey Garcia at 135. If we need to go to 140, we'll go to 140." Campbell meanwhile believed he won the fight, speaking to HBO's Max Kellerman he said, "I thought I won the fight. He’s a great champion, but I thought I out-classed him. I didn't think he was landing any shots whatsoever, and I was catching him with all the clean shots."

The fight drew an average of 687,000 viewers and peaked at 726,000 viewers on HBO.

It was later revealed that Campbell's father, Bernard, who had been diagnosed with cancer in 2014, had died two weeks before the bout.

== Undercard ==
Confirmed bouts:

Winner	Loser	Weight division/title belt(s) disputed	Result
(Armenia) Azat Hovhannisyan	(Mexico) Sergio Frias	vacant WBC Continental Americas Super Bantamweight	Unanimous decision
Preliminary bouts
(United States) Rafael Gramajo	(Mexico) Pedro Melo	Super Bantamweight (6 rounds)	Unanimous decision
(United States) Abraham Lopez	(Mexico) Isao Gonzalo Carranza	Super Featherweight (6 rounds)	4th round RTD
(Philippines) Romero Duno	(Mexico) Juan Pablo Sanchez	Lightweight (8 rounds)	Unanimous decision

== Broadcasting ==
Country	Broadcaster
Latin America	Canal Space
Panama	Cable Onda Sports
United Kingdom	Sky Sports
United States	HBO

Preceded by vs. Anthony Crolla II	Jorge Linares's bouts 23 September 2017	Succeeded by vs. Mercito Gesta
Preceded by vs. Darleys Pérez	Luke Campbell's bouts 23 September 2017	Succeeded by vs. Troy James
