= Ricardo Álvarez (boxer) =

Mexican boxer (born 1981)

Personal information
- Nickname: Dinamita
- Born: Ricardo Álvarez Barragán; 21 November 1981 (age 44) Tlajomulco de Zúñiga, Jalisco, Mexico
- Height: 1.70 m (5 ft 7 in)
- Weight: Lightweight; Light welterweight

Boxing career
- Reach: 185 cm (73 in)
- Stance: Orthodox

Boxing record
- Total fights: 30
- Wins: 24
- Win by KO: 14
- Losses: 3
- Draws: 3

Ricardo Álvarez Barragán (born 21 November 1981) is a Mexican professional boxer. His brothers are welterweights Ramón Álvarez, WBC Middleweight Champion Canelo Álvarez and former WBA World Light Middleweight Champion Rigoberto Álvarez.

== Professional career ==
On June 28, 2008, Ricardo has seven brothers who made world history when all of them fought on the same card. The only downside being that three of them failed to win their pro debuts. The other four, more experienced brothers won.

== Professional boxing record ==
30 fights	24 wins	3 losses
By knockout	14	0
By decision	10	3
Draws	3	

No.	Result	Record	Opponent	Type	Round, time	Date	Location	Notes
30	Win	24-3-3	(United States) John Michael Johnson	UD	8 (8)	2014-09-29	(United States) State Farm Arena, Hidalgo	
29	Loss	23-3-3	(Mexico) Sergio Thompson	UD	10 (10)	2014-03-08	(United States) MGM Grand Garden Arena, Las Vegas	For WBC International Lightweight title
28	Win	23-2-3	(United States) Rod Salka	MD	10 (10)	2013-12-14	(United States) Alamodome, San Antonio	
27	Win	22-2-3	(Colombia) Humberto Martinez	RTD	4 (12)	2013-10-05	(Mexico) Salón de Usos Múltiples, Ocotlan	
26	Win	21-2-3	(Mexico) Reyes Sanchez	MD	12 (12)	2013-07-06	(Mexico) Auditorio General Arteaga, Queretaro	
25	Win	20-2-3	(Colombia) Carlos Valdez	KO	2 (12)	2013-04-06	(Mexico) Unidad Deportiva El Chamizal, Zamora	Won WBC Latino Super Lightweight title
24	Win	19-2-3	(Mexico) Mauricio Pintor	SD	12 (12)	2012-10-13	Palacio de los Deportes, Mexico City	
23	Loss	18-2-3	(Nicaragua) Rene Gonzalez	SD	11 (11)	2012-08-18	(Mexico) Gimnasio Miguel Hidalgo, Puebla	
22	Draw	18-1-3	(Mexico) Joksan Hernandez	PTS	10 (10)	2012-06-02	(Mexico) Coliseo Olimpico de la UG, Guadalajara	
21	Win	18-1-2	(Mexico) Adriel Jusaino Rios	KO	3 (10)	2012-03-24	(Mexico) Centro de Usos Multiples, Ciudad Obregon	
20	Win	17-1-2	(Mexico) Adrian Rodriguez	KO	1 (8)	2012-01-21	(Mexico) Coliseo Olimpico de la UG, Guadalajara	
19	Win	16-1-2	(Mexico) Victor Manuel Dominguez	TKO	4 (8)	2011-11-26	(Mexico) Plaza de Toros Rea, Mazatlan	
18	Win	15-1-2	(Mexico) Luis Enrique Luna	KO	7 (8)	2011-10-08	(Mexico) Los Cabos	
17	Win	14-1-2	(Mexico) Juan Carlos Pacheco	TKO	3 (8)	2011-09-10	(Mexico) Universidad Autónoma de Guadalajara, Zapopan	
16	Win	13-1-2	(Mexico) Leonardo Cordoba	KO	2 (6)	2011-08-20	(Mexico) Casino Black Pyramid, Manzanillo	
15	Win	12-1-2	(Mexico) Aldo Hernandez	UD	6 (6)	2011-07-23	(Mexico) Coliseo Olimpico de la UG, Guadalajara	
14	Win	11-1-2	(Mexico) Osvaldo Gonzalez	KO	1 (6)	2011-03-25	(Mexico) Arena Jalisco, Guadalajara	
13	Loss	10-1-2	(Mexico) Armando Patino	UD	6 (6)	2010-09-16	(Mexico) Arena Jalisco, Guadalajara	
12	Draw	10-0-2	(Mexico) Miguel Angel Mendoza	TD	1 (6)	2010-08-06	(Mexico) Arena Jalisco, Guadalajara	
11	Win	10-0-1	(Mexico) Oscar Ivan Perez Perez	KO	2 (4)	2010-05-07	(Mexico) Coliseo Olimpico de la UG, Guadalajara, Jalisco	
10	Win	9-0-1	(Mexico) Rafael Falcon Estrella	KO	1 (6)	2010-04-03	(Mexico) Coliseo Olimpico de la UG, Guadalajara, Jalisco	
9	Win	8-0-1	(Mexico) Luis Angel Hernandez Garcia	TKO	2 (6)	2010-02-27	(Mexico) Coliseo Olimpico de la UG, Guadalajara, Jalisco	
8	Win	7-0-1	(Mexico) Jorge Hernandez	KO	2 (6)	2009-10-03	(Mexico) Coliseo Olimpico de la UG, Guadalajara, Jalisco	
7	Win	6-0-1	(Mexico) Juan Carlos Fregoso	TKO	2 (4)	2009-02-21	(Mexico) Auditorio Benito Juarez, Guadalajara, Jalisco	
6	Win	5-0-1	(Mexico) Jesus Aceves	SD	4 (4)	2008-12-06	(Mexico) Palenque Calle 2, Zapopan, Jalisco	
5	Win	4-0-1	(Mexico) Jesus Guerrero	UD	4 (4)	2008-10-17	(Mexico) Auditorio Benito Juarez, Guadalajara, Jalisco	
4	Win	3-0-1	(Mexico) Jose Manuel Paredes	UD	4 (4)	2008-08-29	(Mexico) Coliseo Olimpico de la UG, Guadalajara, Jalisco	
3	Win	2-0-1	(Mexico) Ivan Orona	UD	4 (4)	2008-06-28	(Mexico) Palenque Calle 2, Zapopan, Jalisco	
2	Draw	1-0-1	(Mexico) Wily Medina	PTS	4 (4)	2008-05-16	(Mexico) Coliseo Olimpico de la UG, Guadalajara, Jalisco	
1	Win	1-0	(Mexico) Luis Medina	UD	4 (4)	2008-02-08	(Mexico) Coliseo Olimpico de la UG, Guadalajara, Jalisco	

== See also ==
- Notable boxing families
