= Jorge Linares vs. Vasiliy Lomachenko =

Boxing match

- Date: 12 May 2018
- Venue: Madison Square Garden, New York City, New York, U.S.
- Title(s) on the line: WBA and The Ring lightweight titles

Tale of the tape
Boxer	Jorge Linares	Vasiliy Lomachenko
Nickname	"El Niño de Oro"	"Loma"
Hometown	Barinas, Barinas, Venezuela	Bilhorod-Dnistrovskyi, Odesa Oblast, Ukraine
Purse	$1,000,000	$1,200,000
Pre-fight record	44–3 (27 KO)	10–1 (8 KO)
Age	32 years, 8 months	30 years, 2 months
Height	5 ft 7 in (170 cm)	5 ft 7 in (170 cm)
Weight	134 1/4 lb (61 kg)	134 1/2 lb (61 kg)
Style	Orthodox	Southpaw
Recognition	WBA and The Ring; Lightweight Champion; TBRB; No. 2 Ranked Lightweight; 3-division world champion	WBO; Super Featherweight Champion; The Ring/TBRB; No. 1 Ranked Super Featherweight; The Ring No. 3 ranked pound-for-pound fighter 2-division world champion

Result
- Lomachenko defeats Linares by 10th round TKO

Jorge Linares vs. Vasiliy Lomachenko, was a professional boxing match contested on 12 May 2018, for the WBA and The Ring Lightweight championship.

== Background ==
Following his 3rd title defence against Mercito Gesta in January 2018, WBA and The Ring lightweight champion Jorge Linares would name Mikey Garcia (who had previously refused to face Linares) and Vasiliy Lomachenko as potential opponents, "You know what's nice? That people mention my name. That's fine that they mention my name. Let them get in the ring with me."

On 30 January Top Rank's Bob Arum told ESPN that negotiations had begun in December 2017 for a fight between Linares and two-weight world champion Vasiliy Lomachenko with the fight to take place on either 28 April or 12 May as the main event on an ESPN card. On 13 March, Los Angeles Times confirmed that terms had been agreed between both sides with Madison Square Garden in New York City was confirmed as the venue.

On 21 March the fight was officially announced for 12 May with Linares quoted as saying "This is the fight that boxing fans wanted. This will be a super fight between two of the best champions. Not only will I demonstrate why I'm the best lightweight in the world, but also that I'm one of the best pound-for-pound fighters in the world. I have the speed, skill and power to win this battle. This May 12, Vasiliy Lomachenko will bow down to 'King' Jorge." Lomachenko meanwhile said "We are very excited about the fight. It should be a great one. Fans from around the world have been waiting for Jorge and me to fight. We appreciate the work Top Rank did to put this fight together, and thanks to the television networks that helped make it happen. I am looking forward to May 12 in New York to make my debut in the big arena at Madison Square Garden."

ESPN agreed to televise the fight at 8 p.m. ET/5 p.m. PT, so it would broadcast before HBO's telecast of the Golden Boy promoted Sadam Ali vs. Liam Smith, although Smith would later pull out with illness to be replaced by Jaime Munguía.

On 28 March Linares' trainer Ismael Salas stated that he would likely not be in his corner for the fight due to scheduling conflicts as he was in London training David Haye for his rematch with Tony Bellew, which was set to take place a week before on 5 May. Linares later stated that veteran Rudy Hernandez would lead his corner.

For the fight, Linares was paid a career high $1 million, with Lomachenko receiving a $1.2 million purse.

Speaking before the fight Linares rejected any suggestions that he would go the same way as the last four men to face Lomachenko and quit "Maybe they are cold minded and they quit. I didn't prepare myself for that. That's not who I am. He is a fighter that overwhelms, psychologically, the opponent. I am ready to go 15 rounds if that is what it takes and one thing I know for sure, I am not quitting. I want to be unique. I want the elite, that's what will put me at the top level."

== The fight ==
From the opening round Linares looked to use his jab to control the action while Lomachenko would make use of his advantage in hand speed to pepper the champion with quick punches on the inside and then spin away before he took any counter punches. Linares' right eye began to swell by the 4th round, then in the following round he received a warning from referee Ricky Gonzalez for a low blow. Lomachenko would end the round by rocking Linares with a left hook seconds before the bell. The challenger appeared to be on top in the 6th, before right at the very end of the round, a clean straight right hand right down the middle sent Lomachenko onto the canvas for the first time in his professional career. He beat the count and did not appear hurt with the bell preventing Linares from following up.

The two continued to trade back and forth as Linares' eye worsened until the 10th when an uppercut midway through the round rocked the champion. Later in the round Lomachenko sent Linares towards the ropes with a series of punches before a left hand to the body dropped Linares to one knee. He beat the count, but the referee didn't like what he saw and stopped the fight. At the time of stoppage, two judges had each fighter ahead 86–84 on their respective scorecards and the third judge Julie Lederman had it 85–85 even.

According to CompuBox, Linares landed 207 of 739 punches thrown (28.0%) while Lomachenko landed 213 of 627 punches thrown (34.0%).

== Aftermath ==
After the fight, Lomachenko said, "It was a great fight. That right hand [that knocked me down], it was a great punch. It happens. I prepared for the last few rounds, and my father [and trainer Anatoly Lomachenko] told me, 'You need to go to the body.' Linares is a great champion, and the fight was good for the fans and everybody." Speaking of the knockout punch, Linares said it was 'perfectly landed.' De La Hoya also congratulated Arum on the fight and told Arum it was good experience working together.

The card averaged 1,024,00 viewers. The fight itself averaged 1,439,000 viewers and peaked at 1,749,000 viewers, making it the most-watched boxing fight on cable television in 2018.

== Undercard ==
Confirmed bouts:

Winner	Loser	Weight division/title belt(s) disputed	Result
(Dominican Republic) Carlos Adames	(Mexico) Alejandro Barrera	Light middleweight (10 rounds)	Unanimous decision
(Republic of Ireland) Michael Conlan	(Spain) Ibon Larrinaga	Featherweight (8 rounds)	Unanimous decision
(United States) Teofimo Lopez	(Brazil) Vitor Jones	Lightweight (8 rounds)	1st-round KO
(United States) Mikaela Mayer	(New Zealand) Baby Nansen	Lightweight (6 rounds)	Unanimous decision
(United States) Jamel Herring	(Mexico) Juan Pablo Sanchez	Lightweight (8 rounds)	5th-round TKO
(Uzbekistan) Fazliddin Gaibnazarov	(Mexico) Jesus Silveyra Carrillo	Light Welterweight (8 rounds)	4th-round TKO

== Broadcasting ==
Country	Broadcaster
France	RMC Sport
Mexico	Azteca
Panama	RPC Channel 4
Ukraine	Inter
United Kingdom	BoxNation
United States	ESPN+

Preceded by vs. Mercito Gesta	Jorge Linares's bouts 12 May 2018	Succeeded by vs. Abner Cotto
Preceded by vs. Guillermo Rigondeaux	Vasiliy Lomachenko's bouts 12 May 2018	Succeeded by vs. José Pedraza
