= Daniel Estrada =

Daniel Estrada may refer to:

- Daniel Estrada (politician) (1947–2003), Peruvian lawyer and politician
- Daniel Estrada (boxer) (born 1985), Mexican boxer
- Daniel Estrada (athlete) (born 1990), Chilean long-distance runner
