= Shawn Porter vs. Kell Brook =

Boxing competition

- Date: August 16, 2014
- Venue: StubHub Center, Carson, California, U.S.
- Titles on the line: IBF welterweight title

Tale of the tape
Boxer	(United States) Shawn Porter	(United Kingdom) Kell Brook
Nickname	"Showtime"	"The Special One"
Hometown	Akron, Ohio, U.S.	Sheffield, South Yorkshire, UK
Purse	$500,000	$200,000
Pre-fight record	24–0–1 (15 KOs)	32–0 (22 KOs)
Age	26 years, 9 months	28 years, 3 months
Height	5 ft 6 in (168 cm)	5 ft 9 in (175 cm)
Weight	147 lb (67 kg)	147 lb (67 kg)
Style	Orthodox	Orthodox
Recognition	IBF; Welterweight Champion; The Ring; No. 4 Ranked Welterweight; TBRB; No. 6 Ranked Welterweight	IBF; No. 1 Ranked Welterweight; The Ring; No. 5 Ranked Welterweight; TBRB; No. 9 Ranked Welterweight

Result
- Brook defeats Porter by majority decision

Shawn Porter vs. Kell Brook was a professional boxing match contested on August 16, 2014, for the IBF welterweight championship. The bout took place on August 16, 2014 at the StubHub Center in Carson, California. Brook defeated Porter by majority decision, with two judges scoring the bout 117–111 and 116–112 in favour of Brook, while the third scored it a draw at 114–114.

== Background ==
=== Porter ===
Shawn Porter had won his world title by defeating Devon Alexander on December 7, 2013. He went on to defend his title against Paulie Malignaggi on April 19, 2014. He went into the fight with Brook as a heavy favourite, with boxers Keith Thurman, Amir Khan and Devon Alexander all predicting Porter would knock Brook out.

=== Brook ===
Kell Brook had been in line to face the IBF champion since October, 2012. Although he had been rated as the number 1 contender for nearly two years, many boxing experts questioned his previous opposition, and felt Porter would be too big a step up.

=== Fight Purses ===
- Shawn Porter ($500,000) lost Kell Brook ($200,000)
- Sakio Bika ($700,000) lost Anthony Dirrell ($500,000)
- Deontay Wilder ($50,000) def. Jason Gavern ($32,500)
- Omar Figueroa ($270,000) def. Daniel Estrada ($130,000)

== The Fight ==
Despite being a heavy underdog, Brook boxed well against Porter, and collected the victory via a majority decision.

Brook: 441 Thrown, 158 Landed, 36% Connect Rate

Porter: 626 Thrown, 154 Landed, 25% Connect Rate

== Aftermath ==
Brook stated he was confident he had won the fight afterwards, whilst Porter said he felt he was "still the champion." There was criticism from Kenny Porter, Shawn Porter's father and trainer, about what he perceived as excessive clinching from Kell Brook despite Porter being just as bad or more so by hitting Brook at the back of the head.

== Undercard ==
Confirmed bouts:

== Broadcasting ==
Country	Broadcaster
Australia	Main Event
Panama	RPC
Poland	Polsat Sport
United Kingdom	Sky Sports
United States	Showtime
