= Jorge Linares vs. Anthony Crolla II =

Boxing match

Repeat Or Revenge
- Date: 25 March 2017
- Venue: Manchester Arena, Manchester, England, UK
- Title(s) on the line: WBA and The Ring lightweight titles

Tale of the tape
Boxer	Jorge Linares	Anthony Crolla
Nickname	"El Niño de Oro"	"Million Dolla"
Hometown	Barinas, Barinas, Venezuela	Manchester, England, UK
Pre-fight record	41–3 (27 KO)	31–5–3 (13 KO)
Age	31 years, 7 months	30 years, 4 months
Height	5 ft 7 in (170 cm)	5 ft 8 1/2 in (174 cm)
Weight	134 1/4 lb (61 kg)	134 1/4 lb (61 kg)
Style	Orthodox	Orthodox
Recognition	WBA and The Ring; Lightweight Champion; TBRB; No. 2 Ranked Lightweight; 3-division world champion	WBA/The Ring; No. 4 Ranked Lightweight; TBRB; No. 6 Ranked Lightweight; Former Lightweight Champion

Result
- Linares defeats Crolla by unanimous decision

Jorge Linares vs. Anthony Crolla II, billed as Repeat Or Revenge, was a professional boxing match contested on 25 March 2017, for the WBA and The Ring lightweight championship.

== Background ==
After his close decision victory over Anthony Crolla in September 2016 to win the WBA and The Ring lightweight titles Jorge Linares told the Manchester crowd that he was open to a rematch saying "I want to tell all the people thank you very much. We gave Manchester a beautiful fight and we can do it again."

On 6 October the WBC ordered negotiations to begin between Linares and their titleholder Dejan Zlatičanin, which no deadlines in place. A doctors report revealed that Linares had hurt his right hand during the Crolla fight and wouldn't be returning to the ring in the near future. Due to that reason, Zlatičanin was permitted to make a voluntary defence.

Reports in early December suggested a rematch could possibly take place in Manchester on 25 March 2017 with the winner ordered to fight the winner of the Dejan Zlatičanin vs. Mikey Garcia bout, due to take place January, which was won by Garcia, in a unification fight. An official announcement was made on 4 January for the fight take place at the Manchester Arena in Manchester. The fight would be televised live on Sky Sports in the UK and on 24 January, Showtime announced they would cover the fight in the United States.

Speaking in the build up Crolla admitted that defeating Linares would take the best performance of his career "Winning it back on Saturday would, without doubt, be the highlight of my career. There's a lot of people out there who think there's no way I can beat Jorge Linares. Jorge is a great fighter but I'll prove an awful lot of people wrong. I'm a realist. I know it's going to take a career best performance."

Linares was a 8/15 favourite to win with the bookmakers, while Crolla was a 2/1 underdog.

== The fight ==
Crolla started off well hitting to body, but Linares quickly capitalised and started connected well to the body and landing combinations of uppercuts. Crolla was dropped in the 7th round by a left uppercut. At the end of round 11, Crolla's trainer Joe Gallagher came into the ring and walked towards referee Howard John Foster, possibly to stop the fight. After Crolla pleaded with him, Gallagher allowed him to go out for the final round.

The fight again went the distance with both fighters embracing at the final bell. Linares won via a wide 118–109 unanimous decision on all three scorecards.

== Aftermath ==
In the post-fight interview, Linares thanked his promoter Oscar De La Hoya for making the trip and watching him ringside and said his next move would be a big pay day in Las Vegas against WBC lightweight champion Mikey Garcia. Crolla apologized to the live attendance, admitted he lost to the better man and said he would be back to rebuild, "Manchester, I am so sorry I couldn't do it for you. Your support means so much to me. He caught me but before that I thought I could get to him. I got beaten by the better man - no excuses. I am 30 years old, I am going to rest, but I believe I can go again." Crolla also admitted that he was considering moving up to light welterweight to possibly face fellow former world champion Ricky Burns.

== Undercard ==
Confirmed bouts:

Winner	Loser	Weight division/title belt(s) disputed	Result
(United Kingdom) Lawrence Okolie	(Brazil) Geoffrey Cave	Cruiserweight (4 rounds)	1st-round KO
(United Kingdom) Jack Arnfield	(United Kingdom) Brian Rose	WBA International Middleweight title	Unanimous decision
(Republic of Ireland) Katie Taylor	(Bulgaria) Milena Koleva	Lightweight (8 rounds)	Unanimous decision
(United Kingdom) Jason Welborn	(United Kingdom) Marcus Morrison	WBC International Silver Middleweight title	Unanimous decision
(United Kingdom) Martin Joseph Ward	(United Kingdom) Maxi Hughes	British Super Featherweight title	Unanimous decision
(United Kingdom) Hosea Burton	(Hungary) Tamas Kozma	Light heavyweight (8 rounds)	Points decision
Preliminary bouts
(United Kingdom) Ben Sheedy	(United Kingdom) Rob Brown	Super middleweight (6 rounds)	Points decision
(United Kingdom) Sean McGoldrick	(United Kingdom) Brett Fidoe	Bantamweight (4 rounds)	Points decision
Non-TV bouts
(Czech Republic) Karel Horejsek	(United Kingdom) Tomi Tatham	Cruiserweight (8 rounds)	1st-round TKO
(United Kingdom) Nathan Wheatley	(United Kingdom) Chris Jenkinson	Middleweight (4 rounds)	Points decision

== Broadcasting ==
Country	Broadcaster
Hungary	Sport 2
Latin America	Canal Space
Panama	RPC Channel 4
United States	Showtime
United Kingdom	Sky Sports

Preceded by First bout	Jorge Linares's bouts 25 March 2017	Succeeded by vs. Luke Campbell
Preceded by First bout	Anthony Crolla's bouts 25 March 2017	Succeeded by vs. Ricky Burns
