= Omar Figueroa Jr. =

American boxer

Personal information
- Nickname: Panterita
- Nationality: American
- Born: December 13, 1989 (age 36) Weslaco, Texas, U.S.
- Height: 5 ft 7 1/2 in (171 cm)
- Weight: Lightweight; Light welterweight; Welterweight

Boxing career
- Reach: 73 in (185 cm)
- Stance: Orthodox

Boxing record
- Total fights: 32
- Wins: 28
- Win by KO: 19
- Losses: 3
- Draws: 1

Omar Figueroa Jr. (born December 13, 1989) is an American former professional boxer, of Mexican descent, who competed from 2008 to 2022. He held the WBC lightweight title in 2014.

== Amateur career ==
Figueroa had approximately 40 amateur bouts, mostly fought in Texas and Mexico, but quickly turned professional, admitting he "did not care for" the amateur ranks.

== Professional career ==
On January 6, 2012, Figueroa won an upset TKO over undefeated Puerto Rican-American prospect Michael Pérez in a bout televised on Showtime. Figueroa would go on to win a total of six bouts in 2012, including his debut for Golden Boy Promotions, a second-round knockout of Mexico's Ramon Ayala. Building on this success in 2013, Figueroa won a unanimous decision over Japan's Nihito Arakawa for the vacant WBC interim lightweight title, in a fight declared by the Showtime commentator Mauro Ranallo to be a candidate for 2013 Fight of the Year. Writer Scott Christ of the boxing blog Bad Left Hook later said of Figueroa and Arakawa's encounter:

"This fight was unreal and has to be seen to be believed. The brutality was simply off the charts. They might not agree with it today, but I heard more than one person last night say that this was the best fight they've ever seen, or the best fight of the 2000s.

=== Figueroa Jr vs. Burns ===
In 2015, Figueroa defeated former world titlist Ricky Burns via unanimous decision at the State Farm Arena in Hidalgo, Texas

=== Figueroa Jr vs. Molina Jr ===
On 16 February 2019, Figueroa Jr faced John Molina Jr. In a tough contest, Figueroa Jr managed to continuously beat Molina Jr to the punch and outbox Molina Jr, to win the fight via unanimous decision, 99–91, 98-92 and 97–93.

=== Figueroa Jr vs. Ugas ===
In his next bout, Figueroa Jr fought Yordenis Ugas, ranked #5 by the WBC at welterweight. Ugas won the fight convincingly, winning 119-107 across all three scorecards.

=== Figueroa Jr. vs Ramos ===
In his next bout, Figueroa Jr fought Abel Ramos, ranked #8 by the WBA at welterweight. After six rounds Figueroa Jr had taken a lot of punishment from Ramos, which prompted Figueroa Jr's trainer Joel Diaz to stop the fight after the end of the sixth round.

== Professional boxing record ==
| 32 fights | 28 wins | 3 losses |
|---|---|---|
| By knockout | 19 | 2 |
| By decision | 8 | 1 |
| By disqualification | 1 | 0 |
| Draws | 1 | |

| No. | Result | Record | Opponent | Type | Round, time | Date | Location | Notes |
|---|---|---|---|---|---|---|---|---|
| 32 | Loss | 28–3–1 | Sergey Lipinets | RTD | 8 (12), 3:00 | Aug 20, 2022 | Seminole Hard Rock Hotel & Casino, Hollywood, Florida, U.S. | |
| 31 | Loss | 28–2–1 | Abel Ramos | RTD | 6 (12), 3:00 | May 1, 2021 | Dignity Health Sports Park, Carson, California, U.S. | |
| 30 | Loss | 28–1–1 | Yordenis Ugás | UD | 12 | Jul 20, 2019 | MGM Grand Garden Arena, Paradise, Nevada, U.S. | |
| 29 | Win | 28–0–1 | John Molina Jr. | UD | 10 | Feb 16, 2019 | Microsoft Theater, Los Angeles, California, U.S. | |
| 28 | Win | 27–0–1 | Robert Guerrero | TKO | 3 (10), 1:30 | Jul 15, 2017 | Nassau Coliseum, Uniondale, New York, U.S. | |
| 27 | Win | 26–0–1 | Antonio DeMarco | UD | 12 | Dec 12, 2015 | AT&T Center, San Antonio, Texas, U.S. | |
| 26 | Win | 25–0–1 | Ricky Burns | UD | 12 | May 9, 2015 | State Farm Arena, Hidalgo, Texas, U.S. | |
| 25 | Win | 24–0–1 | Daniel Estrada | KO | 9 (12), 1:00 | Aug 16, 2014 | StubHub Center, Carson, California, U.S. | Retained WBC lightweight title |
| 24 | Win | 23–0–1 | Jerry Belmontes | SD | 12 | Apr 26, 2014 | StubHub Center, Carson, California, U.S. | Retained WBC lightweight title |
| 23 | Win | 22–0–1 | Nihito Arakawa | UD | 12 | Jul 27, 2013 | AT&T Center, San Antonio, Texas, U.S. | Won WBC interim lightweight title |
| 22 | Win | 21–0–1 | Abner Cotto | KO | 1 (10), 2:57 | Apr 20, 2013 | Alamodome, San Antonio, Texas, U.S. | Won WBC FECARBOX, vacant WBA–NABA and inaugural WBC Silver interim lightweight titles |
| 21 | Win | 20–0–1 | Henry Aurad | KO | 1 (8), 0:47 | Mar 2, 2013 | Our Lady of the Lake University Gym, San Antonio, Texas, U.S. | |
| 20 | Win | 19–0–1 | Dominic Salcido | UD | 10 | Jul 12, 2012 | U.S. Bank Arena, Cincinnati, Ohio, U.S. | |
| 19 | Win | 18–0–1 | Alain Hernandez | TKO | 1 (8), 1:34 | Jun 23, 2012 | Staples Center, Los Angeles, California, U.S. | |
| 18 | Win | 17–0–1 | Tyler Ziolkowski | KO | 1 (6), 2:00 | Jun 2, 2012 | Home Depot Center, Carson, California, U.S. | |
| 17 | Win | 16–0–1 | Robbie Cannon | TKO | 2 (8), 2:08 | May 5, 2012 | MGM Grand Garden Arena, Paradise, Nevada, U.S. | |
| 16 | Win | 15–0–1 | Ramon Ayala | KO | 2 (10), 2:53 | Mar 16, 2012 | Fantasy Springs Resort Casino, Indio, California, U.S. | |
| 15 | Win | 14–0–1 | Michael Pérez | RTD | 6 (10), 3:00 | Jan 6, 2012 | Fantasy Springs Resort Casino, Indio, California, U.S. | Won vacant WBO Youth Intercontinental lightweight title |
| 14 | Win | 13–0–1 | Marcos Herrera | KO | 2 (8), 1:19 | Aug 28, 2011 | UIC Pavilion, Chicago, Illinois, U.S. | |
| 13 | Win | 12–0–1 | Eric Cruz | UD | 8 | Jun 17, 2011 | State Farm Arena, Hidalgo, Texas, U.S. | |
| 12 | Win | 11–0–1 | John Figueroa | KO | 2 (8), 2:05 | Apr 23, 2011 | Nokia Theatre L.A. Live, Los Angeles, California, U.S. | |
| 11 | Draw | 10–0–1 | Arturo Quintero | SD | 8 | Nov 12, 2010 | State Farm Arena, Hidalgo, Texas, U.S. | |
| 10 | Win | 10–0 | Julian Rodriguez | DQ | 2 (6), 1:15 | Jun 18, 2010 | Events Center, McAllen, Texas, U.S. | Rodriguez disqualified for repeated low blows |
| 9 | Win | 9–0 | Edgar Portillo | UD | 6 | Mar 27, 2010 | The Joint, Paradise, Nevada, U.S. | |
| 8 | Win | 8–0 | Anthony Woods | TKO | 2 (4), 1:46 | Dec 12, 2009 | UIC Pavilion, Chicago, Illinois, U.S. | |
| 7 | Win | 7–0 | Jeremy Marts | TKO | 1 (4), 1:54 | Aug 22, 2009 | Toyota Center, Houston, Texas, U.S. | |
| 6 | Win | 6–0 | Jorge de Leon | TKO | 3 (6), 1:36 | Jun 4, 2009 | Events Center, Pharr, Texas, U.S. | |
| 5 | Win | 5–0 | Ramiro Torres | TKO | 1 (4), 1:59 | May 15, 2009 | Casa de Amistad, Harlingen, Texas, U.S. | |
| 4 | Win | 4–0 | Daniel Garcia | TKO | 3 (8), 1:10 | Feb 27, 2009 | Casa de Amistad, Harlingen, Texas, U.S. | |
| 3 | Win | 3–0 | Arturo Herrera | TKO | 2 (4), 1:20 | Nov 21, 2008 | Casa de Amistad, Harlingen, Texas, U.S. | |
| 2 | Win | 2–0 | Joe Reyes | TKO | 1 (4), 2:59 | Oct 18, 2008 | Casa de Amistad, Harlingen, Texas, U.S. | |
| 1 | Win | 1–0 | Edwin Espinoza | KO | 1 (4), 0:25 | Jun 21, 2008 | Rio Grande Valley Harley Davidson, McAllen, Texas, U.S. | |

== Personal life ==
Omar who is of Mexican descent from the state of Tamaulipas, is the older brother of former boxing champion Brandon Figueroa. Omar Figueroa brought light to mental health in his showtime special where he went on to discuss his childhood upbringing resulting in his struggles with PTSD, ADHD, and bi-polar disorder.He continues to be an advocate for not just athletes but to everyone who struggles with mental health.

== See also ==
- List of Mexican boxing world champions

Sporting positions
Regional boxing titles
| New title | WBO Youth Intercontinental lightweight champion January 6, 2012 – April 2013; Vacated | Title discontinued |
| Vacant Title last held by Dorin Spivey | WBA–NABA lightweight champion April 20, 2013 – July 2013; Vacated | Vacant Title next held by Samuel Kotey Neequaye |
| New title | WBC Silver lightweight champion Interim title April 20, 2013 – July 27, 2013; Won interim world title | Vacant |
| Preceded by Abner Cotto | WBC FECARBOX lightweight champion April 20, 2013 – May 2013; Vacated | Vacant Title next held by Anthony Lora |
World boxing titles
| Vacant Title last held by Antonio DeMarco | WBC lightweight champion Interim title July 27, 2013 – January 27, 2014; Promoted | Vacant Title next held by Devin Haney |
| Preceded by Adrien Broner stripped | WBC lightweight champion January 27, 2014 – November 10, 2014; Status changed | Vacant Title next held by Jorge Linares |
Honorary boxing titles
| Vacant Title last held by Edwin Valero | WBC lightweight champion In recess November 10, 2014 – October 2015; Stripped | Vacant Title next held by Jorge Linares |
