= Nihito Arakawa =

Japanese boxer (born 1981)

Personal information
- Nicknames: The Baby-faced Sniper; Japanese Rocky
- Nationality: Japanese
- Born: Nihito Arakawa; Japanese: 荒川 仁人; 23 December 1981 (age 44) Musashino, Tokyo, Japan
- Height: 5 ft 8 in (1.73 m)
- Weight: Lightweight

Boxing career
- Reach: 71 in (180 cm)
- Stance: Southpaw

Boxing record
- Total fights: 41
- Wins: 32
- Win by KO: 18
- Losses: 7
- Draws: 2

Nihito Arakawa (荒川 仁人, Arakawa Nihito; born 23 December 1981 in Musashino, Tokyo, Japan) is a professional boxer nicknamed "Japanese Rocky". He made his mark in the twelve-round lightweight slugfest against Omar Figueroa in July 2013, that earned him the nickname after the film Rocky. "The Japanese lefty gained a zillion fans with his rumble last year against Figueroa," TheSweetScience.com's Michael Woods said in 2014. He is the former Japanese and OPBF (Oriental and Pacific Boxing Federation) lightweight champion.

== Early life and amateur career ==
Arakawa was born in Musashino, Tokyo, Japan, and move to Fussa soon after. Fussa is the city well known by U.S. Air Force Base and Ryū Murakami's novel Almost Transparent Blue. He enjoyed basketball with fellow kids while living there from the age of two to thirteen, then relocated to Minamiizu, Shizuoka. He became involved in middle-distance running and tennis during junior high school, and served as the captain and pitcher for the high school's baseball team. It was also during high school that he watched the Félix Trinidad fights on WOWOW and was inclined into boxing. He later told that his most favorite fight as of May 2013 was Trinidad vs. Fernando Vargas in December 2000. After five years' stay in Minamiizu, he went back to Fussa and lived there until he moved to Hachioji in March 2012.

He started boxing at the age of nineteen at Hirotaka Nakaya's Hachioji Nakaya Boxing Gym in Hachioji. His amateur record was only 4–1 (3 KOs) that won him a minor title in the light welterweight class.

== Professional career ==
On February 10, 2004, Arakawa made a start to his professional career with a first round knockout at the Korakuen Hall. He defeated Yoshitaka Katō to be crowned the East Japan Rookie King in November 2005, and won the All-Japan Rookie King Tournament in December of that year. He rematched Katō in September 2006 where he suffered his first loss in a close decision. Issei Nakaya of Hachioji Nakaya Promotions had promoted Arakawa until the end of 2014. after having visited boxing venues around the world over years.

=== Regional title fights ===
In September 2008, Arakawa faced Filipino Randy Suico for the OPBF lightweight title, but the fight ended in a majority draw.

==== Japanese title ====
Arakawa won the Japanese lightweight title via a majority decision from Akihiro Kondō in April 2010, after being knocked down for the first time in his career in round one. In his second defense in January 2011, he stopped Hiroshi Nakamori in the eighth round after being floored again in round two. In May 2011, he went to Guadalajara, Mexico for a two-week workout at Julian Magdaleno Gym (Spanish: Gimnasio Julián Magdaleno) where Saúl Álvarez has been training. He defended his title three times all by stoppage before vacating it.

==== OPBF title ====
Arakawa successively captured the vacant OPBF lightweight title via a split decision over Filipino fighter Jay Solmiano in October 2011. It was a tough-fought close bout with Solmiano scoring a knockdown in round two. After defending his title against fellow Japanese Ryūji Migaki by a unanimous decision, he travelled to Los Angeles to spar with Miguel Vázquez and others for over a month. He stopped compatriot Takehiro Shimada in round eight in his second defense in August 2012 while throwing over a hundred punches each in two rounds, and then vacated his title.

=== Arakawa vs. Daniel Estrada ===
In November 2012, Arakawa competed with Mexican Pedro Daniel Estrada in Mexico City on the main event of the Gala Ring Telmex 2012. It was a WBC Silver lightweight title bout and was a title eliminator with a shot at Adrien Broner on the line. After eleven rounds, Estrada was called as the winner with a technical decision. Its refereeing processes and outcome caused controversy in Japan, and more in Mexico. The WBC's official Twitter account tweeted as follows: "There was a controversy in that fight where the winner would be fighting for the title, but because there was this problem, the WBC demanded a rematch. That is a fight for all ring officials to look at." A rematch between them never happened.

=== Arakawa vs. Omar Figueroa ===
On July 27, 2013, Arakawa made his U.S. debut at the event dubbed Knockout Kings II at the AT&T Center in San Antonio, Texas. His opponent fighting out of the blue corner was the undefeated Mexican-American fighter Omar Figueroa, Jr. and the WBC interim lightweight title was at stake. The interim title bout was made when reigning champion Adrien Broner decided to challenge the WBA welterweight title.

The incredibly tough fight that was aired live on Showtime Championship Boxing, and on WOWOW in Japan, ended in Figueroa's victory by a unanimous decision. RingTV.com's Douglass Fischer told as follows:

[Arakawa] epitomized warrior spirit. Watching him throw caution to the wind (and almost 100 punchers per round at Figueroa) was an emotional roller coaster for most of us.
We were entertained, then concerned for his well being, then awed by his fortitude and ultimately humbled by his valor willingness to seemingly sacrifice it all in the spirit of competition.
You know what? Somebody should produce an anime boxing series with Arakawa as the protagonist (or at the very least a Manga book). I'd watch it.

— Douglass Fischer, RingTV.com

"[In 2013,] no fighter raised his stature during the course of one fight as much as Japanese veteran Nihito Arakawa did with the heroic effort he put forth against Omar Figueroa Jr. last July in San Antonio," Fischer later described. At the year's end, MaxBoxing.com's Steve Kim awarded him the Purple Heart.

=== Arakawa vs. Jorge Linares ===
On March 8, 2014, Arakawa came back to the ring to face Japan-based Venezuelan Jorge Linares in a ten-round WBC title eliminator, with a mandatory shot against Omar Figueroa on the line. It was featured on the undercard of the fight between Saúl Álvarez and Alfredo Angulo at the MGM Grand Garden Arena in Las Vegas, Nevada. Figueroa was to fight in the same event, but a wrist injury forced him to postpone it. That is why Arakawa–Linares was carried live on Showtime pay-per-view. Arakawa was again fighting out of the red corner, but lost in a unanimous decision.

In the second half of 2014, he defeated Kondō in their rematch in July, and lost to Katō in their rubber match in December, both by unanimous decision at Korakuen Hall.

Arakawa then transferred to Hitoshi Watanabe's Watanabe Boxing Gym in April 2015. Among his new stable-mates are Takashi Uchiyama, Kōhei Kōno and Ryōichi Taguchi.

== Two nicknames ==
Arakawa's nickname is "The Baby-faced Sniper" because of his quite accurate shots. He is originally a sleek jabbing southpaw. Another characteristic is volume punching. From time to time, he has waged tough fights. His effort might be unsuccessful in one aspect and successful in another. According to Arakawa, the most tough fight for him was the OPBF title defense against Jay Solmiano in October 2011. Ryūji Migaki said in early 2012 that it would be Arakawa's nature. His style in the Omar Figueroa fight in July 2013 earned him a new nickname "Japanese Rocky". During and after the fight, Mauro Ranallo summarize his style as "Bushido".
