= El Inca (film) =

2016 film

- Film poster
- Directed by: Ignacio Castillo Cottin
- Written by: Ignacio Castillo Cottin
- Starring: Alexander Leterni
- Release date: 25 November 2016
- Country: Venezuela
- Language: Spanish

El Inca is a 2016 Venezuelan drama film directed by Ignacio Castillo Cottin. It was selected as the Venezuelan entry for the Best Foreign Language Film at the 90th Academy Awards, but it was not nominated.

== Plot ==
The film tells the story of real-life professional boxer Edwin Valero, undefeated two-weight world champion. His meteoric career tragically ends after he is arrested on suspicion of killing his wife.

== Cast ==
- Alexander Leterni as Edwin Valero
- Scarlett Jaimes as Joselin
- Miguel Ferrari as Zambrano
- Daniela Bueno as Wendy
- Leonidas Urbina as Domingo
- Eduardo Gulino as policemen
- Guillermo Garcia as passenger taxi
- Carla Muller as Emily

== See also ==
- List of submissions to the 90th Academy Awards for Best Foreign Language Film
- List of Venezuelan submissions for the Academy Award for Best Foreign Language Film
- List of banned films
