= Antonio DeMarco =

Mexican boxer (born 1986)

Personal information
- Born: Antonio de Marco Soto; January 7, 1986 (age 40) Los Mochis, Sinaloa, Mexico
- Height: 5 ft 10 in (178 cm)
- Weight: Lightweight; Light welterweight

Boxing career
- Reach: 71 in (180 cm)
- Stance: Southpaw

Boxing record
- Total fights: 43
- Wins: 33
- Win by KO: 24
- Losses: 9
- Draws: 1

Antonio de Marco Soto (born January 7, 1986), best known as Antonio "Tony" DeMarco, is a Mexican professional boxer. He held the WBC lightweight title from 2011 to 2012. DeMarco is a cousin of former world champion Humberto Soto.

== Professional career ==
=== Lightweight ===
DeMarco claimed an interim belt after he dominated José Alfaro for 10 rounds before a stoppage was called. Demarco won every round before dropping Alfaro three times in the 10th round. Demarco's unbeaten streak is 15-0-1 with 10 knockouts, including 12 consecutive wins, since losing a six-round, majority decision to Anthony Vasquez in February 2006. He lined himself up to face the monster-punching full WBC titlist, Edwin Valero.

DeMarco's first chance at being world champion was unsuccessful after he was stopped by the late Edwin Valero of Venezuela to retain his WBC Lightweight belt. After absorbing 9 rounds of punishment, DeMarco's trainer advised the referee to stop the fight. DeMarco later stated, “I'm a Mexican fighter, I never wanted to quit but my trainer saw that Edwin was just a better fighter.” When the fight ended, Valero was eight points up on the scorecards of all three judges.

DeMarco rebounded with a second-round TKO victory over Daniel Attah. In his following fight, he defeated Reyes Sanchez by unanimous decision to win the WBC Silver Lightweight title.

=== WBC lightweight champion ===
On October 15, 2011, DeMarco stopped former two division champion Jorge Linares in the 11th round to claim the vacant WBC Lightweight title.

On September 8, 2012, Demarco stepped into the ring to make his second world title defense against John Molina Jr. In round 1 DeMarco landed his straight left hand onto Molina's face and sent Molina back. As DeMarco had Molina hurt and up against the ropes, the referee jumped in and called a stop to the bout, only 44 seconds into the fight.

=== Light welterweight ===
==== DeMarco vs. Vargas ====
On November 22, 2014, Antonio DeMarco attempted to win his third world title in the junior welterweight division. DeMarco faced former olympian and current (Regular) WBA Junior Welterweight Champion Jesse Vargas. This fight took place at The Venetian Macao in Macau, SAR on the undercard of Manny Pacquiao vs. Chris Algieri on HBO PPV.

== Professional boxing record ==
43 fights	33 wins	9 losses
By knockout	24	2
By decision	8	7
By disqualification	1	0
Draws	1	

No.	Result	Record	Opponent	Type	Round, time	Date	Location	Notes
43	Loss	33–9–1	Giovani Santillan	MD	10	Jun 16, 2020	MGM Grand Conference Center, Paradise, Nevada, U.S.	
42	Loss	33–8–1	Jamal James	UD	10	Jul 13, 2019	Minneapolis Armory, Minneapolis, U.S.	
41	Loss	33–7–1	Maxim Dadashev	UD	10	Oct 20, 2018	Park MGM, Paradise, Nevada, U.S.	For NABF super lightweight title
40	Win	33–6–1	Eddie Ramirez	TKO	1 (10), 1:56	Oct 14, 2017	StubHub Center, Carson, California, U.S.	
39	Win	32–6–1	Luis Solis	UD	10	Feb 11, 2017	Gimnasio Municipal Gustavo Díaz Ordaz, Tecate, Mexico	
38	Loss	31–6–1	Omar Figueroa Jr.	UD	12	Dec 12, 2015	AT&T Center, San Antonio, Texas, U.S.	
37	Loss	31–5–1	Rances Barthelemy	UD	10	Jun 20, 2015	MGM Grand Garden Arena, Paradise, Nevada, U.S.	
36	Loss	31–4–1	Jessie Vargas	UD	12	Nov 22, 2014	Cotai Arena, Macau, SAR	For WBA (Regular) super lightweight title
35	Win	31–3–1	Lanardo Tyner	UD	10	Aug 23, 2014	Campos Deportivos de la Casa Social Cerveceria, Tecate, Mexico	
34	Win	30–3–1	Jesus Gurrola	TKO	2 (10), 2:58	Jan 11, 2014	Hipódromo de Agua Caliente, Tijuana, Mexico	
33	Win	29–3–1	Fidel Muñoz	TKO	5 (10), 1:21	Aug 10, 2013	Hipódromo de Agua Caliente, Tijuana, Mexico	
32	Loss	28–3–1	Adrien Broner	TKO	8 (12), 1:49	Nov 17, 2012	Boardwalk Hall, Atlantic City, New Jersey, U.S.	Lost WBC lightweight title
31	Win	28–2–1	John Molina Jr.	TKO	1 (12), 0:44	Sep 8, 2012	Oracle Arena, Oakland, California, U.S.	Retained WBC lightweight title
30	Win	27–2–1	Miguel Román	KO	5 (12), 2:59	Mar 17, 2012	Polideportivo Centenario, Los Mochis, Mexico	Retained WBC lightweight title
29	Win	26–2–1	Jorge Linares	TKO	11 (12), 2:32	Oct 15, 2011	Staples Center, Los Angeles, California, U.S.	Won vacant WBC lightweight title
28	Win	25–2–1	Reyes Sanchez	UD	12	Feb 26, 2011	Eihusen Arena, Grand Island, Nebraska, U.S.	Won WBC Silver lightweight title
27	Win	24–2–1	Daniel Attah	TKO	2 (10), 2:30	Jul 17, 2010	Agua Caliente Casino Resort Spa, Rancho Mirage, California, U.S.	
26	Loss	23–2–1	Edwin Valero	RTD	9 (12), 3:00	Feb 6, 2010	Monterrey Arena, Monterrey, Mexico	For WBC lightweight title
25	Win	23–1–1	José Alfaro	TKO	10 (12), 2:07	Oct 31, 2009	Treasure Island Hotel and Casino, Paradise, Nevada, U.S.	Won vacant WBC interim lightweight title
24	Win	22–1–1	Anges Adjaho	KO	9 (12)	Jul 11, 2009	BankAtlantic Center, Sunrise, Florida, U.S.	
23	Win	21–1–1	Almazbek Raiymkulov	RTD	9 (12), 3:00	Feb 7, 2009	Honda Center, Anaheim, California, U.S.	Won vacant WBO–NABO lightweight title
22	Win	20–1–1	Jose Reyes	SD	10	Sep 5, 2008	Star of the Desert Arena, Primm, Nevada, U.S.	
21	Win	19–1–1	Juan Castaneda Jr.	TKO	5 (8), 0:42	May 2, 2008	Chumash Casino Resort, Santa Ynez, California, U.S.	
20	Win	18–1–1	Juan Carlos Martinez	UD	8	Mar 1, 2008	Home Depot Center, Carson, California, U.S.	
19	Win	17–1–1	Arthur Brambila	TKO	2 (8), 2:24	Nov 30, 2007	Chumash Casino Resort, Santa Ynez, California, U.S.	
18	Win	16–1–1	Nick Casal	UD	10	Sep 7, 2007	Chumash Casino Resort, Santa Ynez, California, U.S.	
17	Win	15–1–1	Roberto Valenzuela	TKO	1 (8), 1:12	Jul 28, 2007	Emerald Queen Casino, Tacoma, Washington, U.S.	
16	Win	14–1–1	Jose Rivera	DQ	2 (4), 1:06	Jul 6, 2007	Auditorio Benito Juarez, Los Mochis, Mexico	
15	Win	13–1–1	Yahir Aguiar	TKO	3 (6), 1:01	Jun 1, 2007	Chumash Casino Resort, Santa Ynez, California, U.S.	
14	Win	12–1–1	Raymundo Gonzalez	TKO	2 (6)	Mar 3, 2007	Home Depot Center, Carson, California, U.S.	
13	Draw	11–1–1	Curtis Meeks	MD	6	Oct 6, 2006	Chumash Casino Resort, Santa Ynez, California, U.S.	
12	Win	11–1	Anthony Ivy	TKO	2 (6), 1:43	Jul 29, 2006	Chumash Casino Resort, Santa Ynez, California, U.S.	
11	Win	10–1	Ricardo Valencia	TKO	4 (6), 2:03	Jun 2, 2006	Chumash Casino Resort, Santa Ynez, California, U.S.	
10	Win	9–1	Hector Rivera	UD	4	May 25, 2006	Blancas Bazaar, Imperial Beach, California, U.S.	
9	Loss	8–1	Anthony Vasquez	MD	6	Feb 4, 2006	Don Haskins Center, El Paso, Texas, U.S.	
8	Win	8–0	Carlos Mota	TKO	2 (4), 1:10	Jan 13, 2006	4th & B, San Diego, California, U.S.	
7	Win	7–0	Joseph Tyrone Davis	TKO	3 (4), 2:54	Nov 18, 2005	Athletic Center, New Haven, Connecticut, U.S.	
6	Win	6–0	Ricky Alexander	TKO	2 (4), 1:07	Nov 5, 2005	Caesars Tahoe, Stateline, Nevada, U.S.	
5	Win	5–0	Abel Hernandez	UD	4	Oct 21, 2005	Chumash Casino Resort, Santa Ynez, California, U.S.	
4	Win	4–0	Valente Rojas	KO	2 (4), 2:19	Aug 8, 2005	Palenque del Hipódromo de Agua Caliente, Tijuana, Mexico	
3	Win	3–0	Crisanto Fernandez	TKO	2	Nov 15, 2004	Auditorio Municipal, Tijuana, Mexico	
2	Win	2–0	Alejandro Rivera	TKO	1	Jul 19, 2004	Auditorio Municipal, Tijuana, Mexico	
1	Win	1–0	Antonio Valencia	TKO	2 (4)	Jun 21, 2004	Discoteca Baby Rock, Tijuana, Mexico	

== See also ==
- List of WBC world champions
- List of Mexican boxing world champions

Sporting positions
Regional boxing titles
Vacant Title last held by Jorge Teron	WBO–NABO lightweight champion February 7, 2009 – July 2009; Vacated	Vacant Title next held by Martin Honorio
Vacant Title last held by Reyes Sanches	WBC Silver lightweight champion February 26, 2011 – October 15, 2011; Won world title	Vacant Title next held by Alejandro Sanabria
World boxing titles
Vacant Title last held by Joel Casamayor	WBC lightweight champion Interim title October 31, 2009 – February 6, 2010; Lost bid for full title	Vacant Title next held by Omar Figueroa
Vacant Title last held by Humberto Soto	WBC lightweight champion October 15, 2011 – November 17, 2012	Succeeded by Adrien Broner
