= Abner Cotto =

Puerto Rican boxer

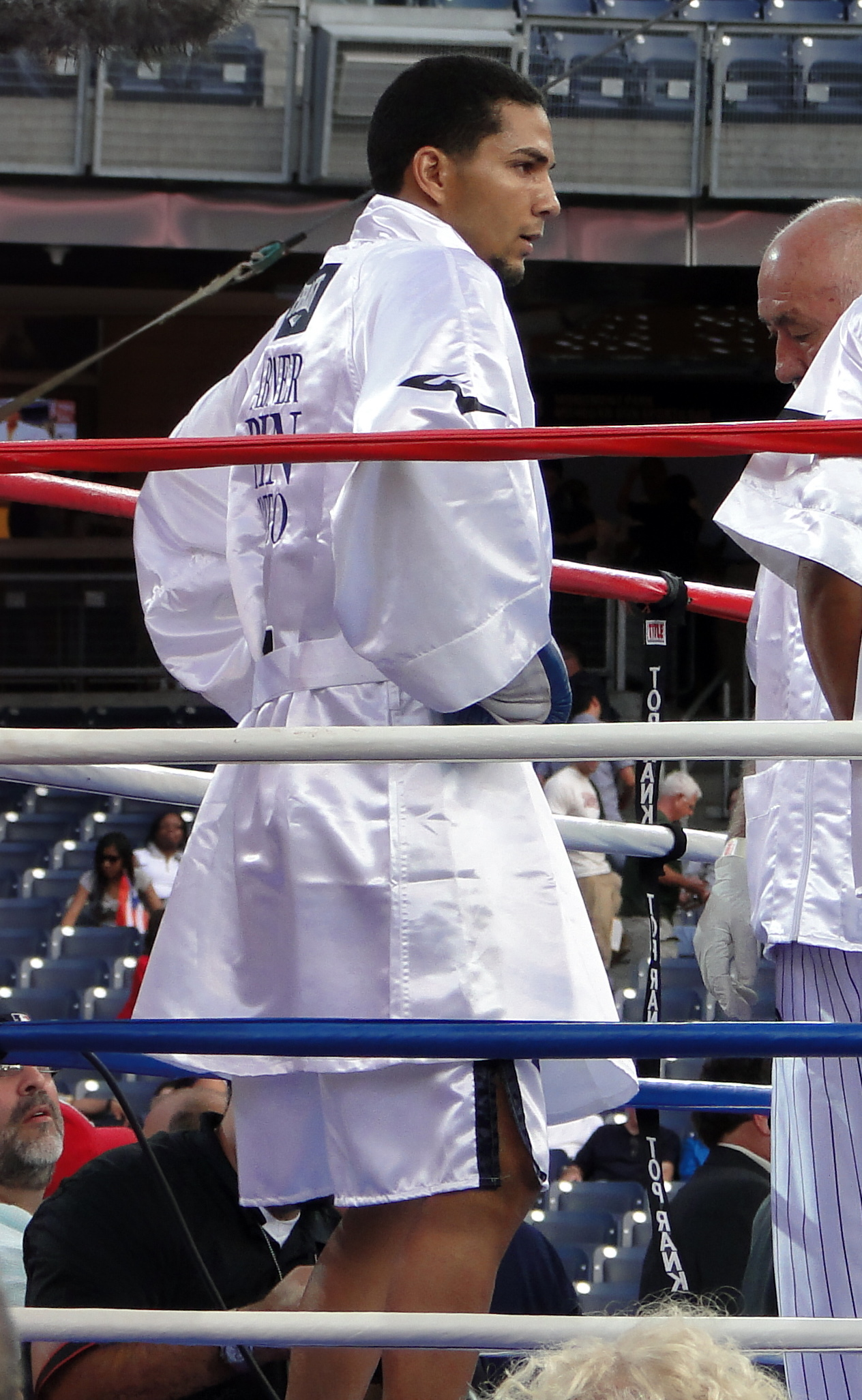
- Cotto in June 2010

Personal information
- Nickname: Pin
- Nationality: Puerto Rico
- Born: Abner Joel Cotto Román; August 10, 1987 (age 39) Caguas, Puerto Rico
- Height: 5 ft 9 in (175 cm)
- Weight: Lightweight

Boxing career
- Stance: Orthodox

Boxing record
- Total fights: 27
- Wins: 23
- Win by KO: 12
- Losses: 4
- Draws: 0
- No contests: 0
Medal record
Men's boxing
Representing Puerto Rico
Pan American Games
Silver medal – second place	2007 Rio de Janeiro	Featherweight

Abner Joel Cotto Román (Note: In this Spanish name, the first or paternal surname is Cotto and the second or maternal family name is Román.) (born August 10, 1987) is a Puerto Rican professional boxer who currently competes in the lightweight division. He is a member of the Cotto family, which has produced a professional world champion and multiple amateur medalists. As an amateur, Cotto has represented Puerto Rico in international competitions. The pugilist compiled several national championships and recognitions, including his division's silver medal at the 2007 Pan American Games.

== Amateur career ==
=== Early life ===
Cotto was the third of four brothers born to Simón Cotto and María Román. He is part of a family that has several members involved in the sport of boxing. Among his relatives there are pugilists, including his second cousin, multiple-division world champion Miguel Cotto and Pan American medalist José Miguel Cotto. Two of his uncles, Miguel Cotto Sr. and Evangelista Cotto were former boxers and worked in other aspects of the sport. Other members of the family practice other sports, such as professional wrestler Carlos Cotto. Following this tradition, he became involved in the discipline at the age of ten, receiving training from Efraín Román in Aguas Buenas' municipal gymnasium. He won championships in numerous minor categories, eventually conquering Puerto Rico's South Central Regional title. In 2004, while still incapable of competing in the adult division due to his age, Cotto was selected by the Puerto Rican Boxing Federation to form part of the national team's back up group. After receiving this position, he participated in the Torneo Internacional José "Cheo" Aponte, advancing to the finals, where he lost to Olympian Carlos Velázquez but injured his arm.

=== National championships and Pan American Games ===
In early 2005, Cotto won the amateur national championship at the featherweight division. Consequently, the pugilist was included in a team that participated in an international tournament held in the Dominican Republic. Upon returning from that competition, he competed in an eliminatory to determine the roster for the Pan American Championships. After winning the first contest against Velázquez by walk over, Cotto defeated Wilfredo Bone by points, 48:19. In the finals he defeated Marcos Jiménez with scores of 43:18. In May 2005, Cotto completed his secondary education graduating from Josefa Pastrana High School. Despite his lack of international experience, he won the bronze medal in the Pan American Championships that took place in September 2005. This was followed by preparatory workouts in the Dominican Republic and Guadeloupe. In the later, he was matched against Khedafi Djelkhir of France, with the contest being declared a draw. Between January 25–28, 2009, Cotto defended his national championship, defeating Velázquez in the process. After participating in a tournament held in Aruba, he participated in the Copa Romana held in the Dominican Republic, winning a bronze medal.

In March 2007, Cotto participated in the first classificatory for the 2007 Pan American Games, finishing second and classifying for the event. The following month he won a silver medal as part of a preparatory event held in Trinidad and Tobago, receiving a trophy for "Best Fighter" in the process. On July 9, 2007, Cotto's wife, Francesca Lavergne, gave birth to his first offspring, Alysha Cotto Lavergne. Only a week later, he debuted at the Pan American Games by defeating Miguel Escandón of Colombia with scores of 22:9. In the quarterfinals Cotto was matched against Luis Del Valle, a Puerto Rican who represented the United States, winning by points (13:9). In the semifinals, he defeated Davi Sousa of Brazil, 19:14. With this victory Cotto advanced to the finals, where he lost to Idel Torriente 5:7, after choosing to fight despite being affected by a cold. Cotto then participated in the 2007 World Amateur Boxing Championships, intending to gain a spot in the roster that participated in the 2008 Summer Olympics. However, he lost his first contest to European Youth Champion Vasyl Lomachenko (26:9). On November 10, 2007, Aguas Buenas' municipal sports hall of fame dedicates its induction ceremony to Cotto. After competing in a tournament held in Martinique, Cotto participated in the American Olympic Qualifications. He defeated Jesús Cuéllar of Argentina (9:8) in his debut and Miguel Marriaga of Colombia (19:18) in the quarterfinals, but didn't qualify for the Olympic Games after losing to Robson Conceiçao (24:6) in the semifinals. On July 20, 2008, he joined Miguel Cotto's team and traveled to Las Vegas, Nevada, following an invitation from Evangelista Cotto, who was interested in managing the pugilist as a professional. This marked the end of Cotto's amateur career, who signed a professional contract in March 2009, concluding with a record of 235-20. Due to his success as an amateur, the municipality of Aguas Buenas named its municipal gymnasium "Gimnasio Abner Cotto", in his honor.

== Professional career ==
A work group dubbed "Team Abner Cotto" and composed by trainer Efraín Román, assistant trainer Armando Alamo and Evangelista Cotto as manager was subsequently assembled. Cotto began his professional career performing for his cousin's promotion, Promociones Miguel Cotto. His first fight took place in Caguas, Puerto Rico, where he defeated Edwin Gómez by knockout in 26 seconds. A month later, Cotto defeated Nelson Agosto in the first of four scheduled rounds. On June 26, 2009, he was paired against Jonathan González, winning by knockout in the second round. In his next fight, Cotto won his first decision over Alberto Amaro repeating the result months later against Guadalupe Guzmán. He closed 2009 by dissolving Jorge Luis Pérez Adorno's undefeated record, defeating him by technical knockout in two rounds. On September 25, 2010, Cotto won a decision over Enrique Quiñónez in six rounds. He closed the year by defeating Alberto de Jesús Trinidad by technical knockout in three rounds. Cotto opened 2011 with a decision victory over Carlos Claudio.

On October 26, 2011, Cotto won the Puerto Rican National Lightweight Championship, earning a decision over Fernando Torres. In his first fight of 2012, he decisioned Hevison Herrera to secure the World Boxing Council's FECARBOX and World Boxing Board's Americas regional championships.

On May 12, 2018, Cotto won the World Boxing Council's Fecarbox (WBC's Caribbean Boxing Federation's) Super Lightweight title by disposing of 11 wins, 11 losses and 3 draws (ties) rival Samuel Santana in four rounds at Cidra, Puerto Rico. he followed that with a bout versus former world champion Jorge Linares, 44-4 with 27 knockout wins coming into their bout, on September 29, 2018, at Indio, California He lost to Linares by third round knockout to fall to 23-4, 12 knockouts himself, record-wise.

== Professional boxing record ==
27 fights	23 wins	4 losses
By knockout	12	3
By decision	11	1

No.	Result	Record	Opponent	Type	Round, time	Date	Location	Notes
27	Loss	23–4	Jorge Linares	KO	3 (12), 1:31	Sep 29, 2018	Fantasy Springs Casino, Indio, California, U.S.	
26	Win	23–3	Samuel Santana	TKO	4 (8), 1:37	May 12, 2018	Cancha Juanito Cabello, Cidra, Puerto Rico	Won vacant WBC-FECARBOX junior welterweight title
25	Win	22–3	Jorge Rodríguez	TKO	1 (8), 2:33	Aug 12, 2017	Coliseo Roger L. Mendoza, Caguas, Puerto Rico	
24	Win	21–3	Edwin López	KO	1 (8), 1:09	May 13, 2017	Coliseo Samuel Rodríguez, Aguas Buenas, Puerto Rico	
23	Win	20–3	Samuel Amoako	UD	6	May 13, 2016	D.C. Armory, Washington, D.C., U.S.	
22	Win	19–3	Edwin López	KO	1 (6), 1:35	Feb 6, 2016	Coliseo Roger L. Mendoza, Caguas, Puerto Rico	
21	Loss	18–3	Javier Fortuna	KO	5 (10), 1:32	Nov 1, 2014	UIC Pavilion, Chicago, Illinois, U.S.	
20	Win	18–2	Jerry Belmontes	SD	10	Aug 7, 2014	American Bank Center, Corpus Christi, Texas, U.S.	
19	Loss	17–2	Francisco Vargas	UD	10	Mar 8, 2014	MGM Grand Garden Arena, Paradise, Nevada, U.S.	
18	Win	17–1	Daniel Ruiz	TKO	4 (8), 0:40	Sep 21, 2013	Oasis Hotel Complex, Cancún, Mexico	
17	Loss	16–1	Omar Figueroa Jr.	KO	1 (10), 2:57	Apr 20, 2013	Alamodome, San Antonio, Texas, U.S.	Lost WBC FECARBOX lightweight title; For vacant WBA-NABA and inaugural WBC Silver interim lightweight titles
16	Win	16–0	Sergio Pérez	RTD	7 (10), 0:01	Dec 22, 2012	Coliseo Roger L. Mendoza, Caguas, Puerto Rico	
15	Win	15–0	Alejandro Rodríguez	UD	10	Nov 17, 2012	Coliseo Roger L. Mendoza, Caguas, Puerto Rico	
14	Win	14–0	Juan Montiel	TKO	8 (8), 2:31	Jul 14, 2012	Mandalay Bay Events Center, Paradise, Nevada, U.S.	
13	Win	13–0	Heivison Herrera	UD	10	Feb 18, 2012	Coliseo Roger L. Mendoza, Caguas, Puerto Rica	Won vacant WBC FECARBOX and WBB Americas lightweight titles
12	Win	12–0	Fernando Torres	UD	10	Oct 28, 2011	Centro de Convenciones, Guayama, Puerto Rico	Won vacant Puerto Rican lightweight title
11	Win	11–0	Carlos Claudio	UD	8	Jul 15, 2011	Coliseo Cosme Beitia Sálamo, Cataño, Puerto Rico	
10	Win	10–0	Alberto de Jesús Trinidad	TKO	3 (8), 2:31	Dec 10, 2010	Coliseo Samuel Rodríguez, Aguas Buenas, Puerto Rico	
9	Win	9–0	Enrique Quiñones	UD	8	Sep 25, 2010	Coliseo Ángel 'Cholo' Espada, Salinas, Puerto Rico	
8	Win	8–0	Edgar Portillo	UD	6	Jun 5, 2010	Yankee Stadium, New York City, New York, U.S.	
7	Win	7–0	Juan Sandoval	UD	4	Apr 30, 2010	Tropicana Las Vegas, Paradise, Nevada, U.S.	
6	Win	6–0	Jorge Luis Pérez Adorno	TKO	2 (6)	Dec 19, 2009	Coliseo Roger L. Mendoza, Caguas, Puerto Rico	
5	Win	5–0	Guadalupe Guzman	UD	6	Nov 14, 2009	MGM Grand Garden Arena, Paradise, Nevada, U.S.	
4	Win	4–0	Alberto Amaro	UD	6	Aug 29, 2009	Coliseo Ruben Viera, Las Piedras, Puerto Rico	
3	Win	3–0	Jonathan González	RTD	2 (4), 0:01	Jun 26, 2009	Coliseo Roger L. Mendoza, Caguas, Puerto Rico	
2	Win	2–0	Nelson Agosto	KO	1 (4)	May 29, 2009	Coliseo Roger L. Mendoza, Caguas, Puerto Rico	
1	Win	1–0	Edwin Gómez	KO	1 (4), 0:41	Apr 24, 2009	Coliseo Roger L. Mendoza, Caguas, Puerto Rico	

== Notes ==
Preceded by Vacant (Edwin Vázquez)	Puerto Rican Lightweight Championship; October 28, 2011 – Present	Succeeded by Incumbent
Preceded by Vacant (Daniel Estrada)	WBC FECARBOX Lightweight Championship; February 18, 2012 – April 20, 2014	Succeeded by Omar Figueroa
Preceded by None (Title Created)	World Boxing Board Americas Lightweight Championship; February 18, 2012 – Present	Succeeded by Incumbent
