= Will Tomlinson =

Australian super featherweight boxer, based in Sydney, New South Wales, Australia

Personal information
- Nickname: Wild
- Nationality: (Australia) Australian
- Born: Will Tomlinson; 13 June 1986 (age 40) Australia
- Height: 5 ft 6 in (1.68 m)
- Weight: Super Featherweight

Boxing career
- Stance: Orthodox

Boxing record
- Total fights: 29
- Wins: 25
- Win by KO: 13
- Losses: 3
- Draws: 1
- No contests: 0

Will Tomlinson (born 13 June 1986) is an Australian boxing promoter and retired super featherweight boxer, based in Melbourne, Victoria, Australia.

== Boxing career ==
=== Amateur career ===
It is unclear how many amateur fights Will Tomilson has had or if he won any titles as an amateur. No valid sources have been submitted.

=== Professional career ===
2008

Tomlinson made his professional debut on 4 July 2008 against Jerry Spanidis, scoring his first victory with a stoppage in the second round. Two months later Tomlinson returned to the ring to stop Troy Glover in the third round. In November Tomlinson KO'd Ekarat Kiatpaiboom in the first round after 54 seconds. After a successful start, Tomlinson fought Jurland Ceniza for the New South Wales State lightweight title in December. Ceniza's team threw in the towel during the second round handing Tomlinson another stoppage win, leaving his record at 4(4)-0-0.

2009

Tomlinson started 2009 in February knocking out Percy Samson in the third round, the following month Tomlinson stopped Kane Buckley in the fourth round. Tomlinson was granted a shot at the vacant Australian super featherweight title on 4 April against Junmar Dulog. The fight ended in a draw after an accidental clash of heads which caused a cuts on both fighters, the doctor stopped fight on Dulog's cut. The following month Tomlinson had another shot at the vacant Australian super featherweight title, this time defeating Matt Powell to win the title. Tomlinson finished the year fighting David Wiremu, Roel Mangan and Verquan Kimbrough, winning all within the scheduled rounds.

2010

Tomlinson first fight of 2010 was against Flash Villacura, who he defeated over 8 rounds on points. Tomlinson then went on to defeat Oscar Bravo (previously undefeated) with a Unanimous points decision over 12 rounds to secure the IBO Intercontinental super featherweight title at Challenge stadium, Perth on 14 April. After this achievement Tomlinson was back in the ring 5 weeks later to chalk up another victory, this time over Ramon Elizer Esperanza with a 4th round DQ. Tomlinson's next fight was for the WBO Oriental super featherweight title, where he dispatched of Elly Ray with an 8th-round TKO on 20 August At flemington Racecourse melbourne. Tomlinson's final fight for 2010 was also his biggest, taking on highly fancied Ray Labao for the WBO Asia Pacific super featherweight title. Tomlinson won a gruelly 12 round fight by unanimous decision.

2011

Tomlinson's first fight in 2011 was Indonesia's Billy Sumba (19–2) which he won on a shut out Unanimous Decision over 10 rounds. One month later he KO's Thailand's Bandung Patavikorngym (19–1) in the 7th round. On 30 November he finally had his first world title fight against Mexico's Alan Herrera (26–3) for the vacant IBO World Super featherweight title. After 12 gruelling rounds, Will Tomlinson was victorious with another shut out unanimous points decision in which many experts named 2011's "Australian fight of the year"

2012

On 18 May Will Tomlinson fought another Mexican named Daniel Ruiz in his first defence of his newly acquired title in Melbourne, Victoria. In front of a sold-out crowd of 2000 people, Tomlinson floored Ruiz in the first round. After that Tomlinson was in total control of the fight. In the 8th round as many tipped Tomlinson to stop Ruiz in that round, they touched gloves and the lights to the venue and the whole suburb went out. When not being able to turn the lights back on the fight was stopped due to unforeseen circumstances, so the referee, Steve Smoger awarded Will Tomlinson the winner at the end of the eighth round with a technical decision, 70 - 62 on all cards, again another shut out performance.

=== Titles won ===
- New South Wales State Lightweight Title
- Australian Super Featherweight Title
- IBO Intercontinental Super Featherweight Title
- WBO Oriental Super Featherweight Title
- WBO Asia Pacific Super Featherweight Title
- IBO World Super Featherweight Title

== Professional boxing record ==
24 Wins (13 Knockouts, 11 Decisions), 2 Loss, 1 Draws
Res.	Record	Opponent	Type	Rd., Time	Date	Location	Titles
Win	24-2-1	(Philippines) Adones Aguelo	MD	10	2015-08-14	(Australia) The Melbourne Pavilion, Flemington, Victoria	
Loss	23-2-1	(Mexico) Francisco Vargas	TKO	8(10)	2015-03-12	San Antonio, Texas, United States	WBC International Super Featherweight title NABF Super Featherweight title
Win	23-1-1	(Mexico) Miguel Zamudio	TKO	8(8)	2014-12-04	(United States) San Diego, California	
Win	22-1-1	(Mexico) Alberto Cupido	UD	8	2014-08-30	Cancun, Mexico	
Loss	21-1-1	(United States) Jerry Belmontes	UD	10	2014-03-08	(United States) USA	

== Later life ==
In 2013 he stood as a political candidate for the Palmer United Party.
