= Jerry Belmontes =

American boxer

Personal information
- Nickname: The Corpus Christi Kid
- Born: December 4, 1988 (age 37) Corpus Christi, Texas, U.S.
- Height: 5 ft 9 in (175 cm)
- Weight: Featherweight; Super featherweight Lightweight

Boxing career
- Reach: 69 in (175 cm)
- Stance: Orthodox

Boxing record
- Total fights: 31
- Wins: 21
- Win by KO: 6
- Losses: 10

Jerry Belmontes (born December 4, 1988) is an American former professional boxer who competed from 2008 to 2026. He signed a multi-fight deal with Golden Boy Promotions in early 2013, and challenged for the WBC lightweight title in 2014.

== Amateur career ==
Belmontes won a gold medal in the 2002 National Silver Gloves at 95 lbs in the 12-13 age range. Two years later, he participated in the 2004 National Junior Olympics at 125 lbs. He also won gold in the 2007 United States under-19 championships at 132 lbs. Additionally, he was a semi finalist to qualify for the 2008 Summer Olympics.

== Professional career ==
Belmontes made his pro debut against fellow 19-year-old Olvin Mejia in Brownsville, Texas, on January 18, 2008, winning by way of unanimous decision. This was the start of a 17 fight win streak spanning almost three years. He was scheduled to face USBA Super bantamweight champion Teon Kennedy in December 2012, but Kennedy was forced to pull out due to an ankle injury. Instead, he fought Eric Hunter, and subsequently lost by way of unanimous decision in a televised 10-round fight on December 8, 2012, in Philadelphia.

Shortly thereafter, he was dropped from Main Events Boxing, only 10 months into a 3-year deal. His next schedule fight against former world featherweight contender Rocky Juarez was scrapped after negotiations fell through. He split his next two fights, before receiving his first title shot one year later. He faced Francisco Vargas for his NABF and WBO Inter-continental Super featherweight titles, and lost via unanimous decision on December 13, 2013, at the Fantasy Springs Casino in Indio, California.

In his next bout, he upset previously undefeated Will Tomlinson, a former IBO Super featherweight champion, by way of unanimous decision on March 8, 2014, on the Saúl Álvarez vs. Alfredo Angulo undercard at the MGM Grand in Las Vegas. On April 26, he fought Omar Figueroa for his WBC lightweight title in the opening bout of a Showtime tripleheader at the StubHub Center in Carson, California. Belmontes had previously beaten Figueroa three times in the amateur ranks, but lost this one by split decision.

He has since lost by decision to fellow contenders Abner Cotto and Miguel Vázquez.

== Personal life ==
His father, Sal, is his trainer. Sal went 3–1 as a professional in the 1980s. Additionally, his brother, Steve, is also a professional boxer, with a 2–0 record.

== Professional boxing record ==
21 Wins (6 knockouts, 14 decisions), 9 Losses (1 knockouts, 8 decisions), 0 Draws
Res.	Record	Opponent	Type	Rd., Time	Date	Location	Notes
Loss	21–9	(Cuba) Richar Abril	UD	10	Jun 3, 2016	(United States) New York City, New York, U.S.	
Win	21–8	(Ukraine) Valentyn Golovko	MD	8	Jan 27, 2016	(United States) BB King Blues Club & Grill, New York City, New York, U.S.	
Win	20–8	(United States) Jerron Lockette	TKO	2 (6), 0:53	Dec 12, 2015	(United States) Richard M. Borchard Regional Fairgrounds, Robstown, Texas, U.S.	
Loss	19–8	(United States) Jason Sosa	KO	1 (8), 2:39	Aug 15, 2015	Coliseo Rubén Rodríguez, Bayamón, Puerto Rico	
Loss	19–7	(Canada) Dierry Jean	UD	10	Jun 20, 2015	Bell Centre, Montreal, Quebec, Canada	For NABF lightweight title
Loss	19–6	(Mexico) Miguel Vázquez	UD	10	Mar 13, 2015	(United States) Citizens Business Bank Arena, Ontario, California, U.S.	
Loss	19–5	(Puerto Rico) Abner Cotto	SD	10	Aug 7, 2014	(United States) American Bank Center, Corpus Christi, Texas, U.S.	
Loss	19–4	(United States) Omar Figueroa	SD	12	Apr 26, 2014	(United States) StubHub Center, Carson, California, U.S.	For WBC lightweight title
Win	19–3	(Australia) Will Tomlinson	UD	10	Mar 8, 2014	(United States) MGM Grand Hotel & Casino, Paradise, Nevada, U.S.	
Loss	18–3	(Mexico) Francisco Vargas	UD	10	Dec 13, 2013	(United States) Fantasy Springs Casino, Indio, California	For NABF and WBO Inter-Continental super featherweight titles
Loss	18–2	(United States) Andrew Cancio	UD	10	Jul 27, 2013	(United States) AT&T Center, San Antonio, Texas, U.S.	
Win	18–1	(Nicaragua) Daniel Díaz	MD	8	Apr 13, 2013	(United States) American Bank Center, Corpus Christi, Texas, U.S.	
Loss	17–1	(United States) Eric Hunter	UD	10	Dec 8, 2012	(United States) McGonigle Hall, Philadelphia, Pennsylvania, U.S.	
Win	17–0	(Dominican Republic) Joselito Collado	UD	8	Sep 8, 2012	(United States) Prudential Center, Newark, New Jersey, U.S.	
Win	16–0	(Dominican Republic) Ramesis Gil	UD	8	May 19, 2012	(United States) Convention Center, Pharr, Texas, U.S.	
Win	15–0	(United States) Justo Vallecillo	UD	6	Jun 24, 2011	(United States) Richard M. Borchard Regional Fairgrounds, Robstown, Texas, U.S.	
Win	14–0	(United States) Eddie Ramírez	TKO	4 (6), 2:27	Dec 7, 2010	(United States) Casa de Amistad, Harlingen, Texas, U.S.	
Win	13–0	(Mexico) Arturo Herrera	TKO	2 (4), 2:33	Aug 27, 2010	(United States) Jacob Brown Auditorium, Brownsville, Texas, U.S.	
Win	12–0	(United States) Gil García	MD	4	Apr 3, 2010	(United States) American Bank Center, Corpus Christi, Texas, U.S.	
Win	11–0	(Kenya) Morris Chule	UD	6	Feb 6, 2010	(United States) Convention Center, McAllen, Texas, U.S.	
Win	10–0	(Mexico) Adauto González	UD	6	Oct 17, 2009	(United States) Whataburger Field, Corpus Christi, Texas, U.S.	
Win	9–0	(United States) Tommy Atencio	UD	4	Aug 29, 2009	(United States) Quick Trip Ballpark, Grand Prairie, Texas, U.S.	
Win	8–0	(Mexico) Juan Velásquez	KO	1 (6)	Jun 20, 2009	Gimnasio Oscar 'Tigre' García, Ensenada, Mexico	
Win	7–0	(United States) Richard Flores	TKO	4 (4), 2:28	Mar 7, 2009	(United States) Mile High Events Center, Commerce City, Colorado, U.S.	
Win	6–0	(Mexico) Jesús Hernández	UD	4	Jan 24, 2009	(United States) Staples Center, Los Angeles, California, U.S.	
Win	5–0	(United States) Guadalupe de Leon	UD	6	Oct 31, 2008	(United States) Hard Rock Hotel and Casino, Paradise, Nevada, U.S.	
Win	4–0	(United States) Jairo Delgado	UD	4	Oct 3, 2008	(United States) National Western Complex Arena, Denver, Colorado, U.S.	
Win	3–0	(Mexico) Martin Armenta	UD	4	Jul 11, 2008	(United States) American Bank Center, Corpus Christi, Texas, U.S.	
Win	2–0	(Puerto Rico) Angel Rosado	KO	1 (4), 1:12	Feb 29, 2008	(United States) Municipal Auditorium, Harlingen, Texas, U.S.	
Win	1–0	(Mexico) Olvin Mejía	UD	4	Jan 18, 2008	(United States) Jacob Brown Auditorium, Brownsville, Texas, U.S.	
