= Edwin Valero =

Venezuelan boxer (1981–2010)

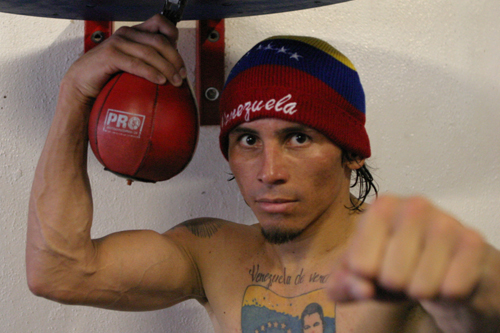
- Valero in 2009

Personal information
- Nicknames: El Inca ("The Inca"); El Dinamita ("The Dynamite"); El Terminator; The Liquidator
- Born: Edwin Antonio Valero Vivas; 3 December 1981 El Vigía, Mérida, Venezuela
- Died: 19 April 2010 (aged 28) Valencia, Carabobo, Venezuela
- Height: 5 ft 6 in (168 cm)
- Weight: Super featherweight; Lightweight

Boxing career
- Reach: 69 in (175 cm)
- Stance: Southpaw

Boxing record
- Total fights: 27
- Wins: 27
- Win by KO: 27

Edwin Antonio Valero Vivas (3 December 1981 – 19 April 2010), also known as El Inca Valero, was a Venezuelan professional boxer who competed from 2002 to 2010. He was an undefeated former world champion in two weight classes, having held the World Boxing Association (WBA) super featherweight title from 2006 to 2008 and the World Boxing Council (WBC) lightweight title from 2009 to 2010.

== Professional career ==
On 25 February 2006, Valero set a new world record by winning his first 18 fights as a professional by first-round knockout, breaking Arthur Susskind's historic record set in 1905. That record has since been broken by Tyrone Brunson, but most boxing experts do not acknowledge Brunson's claim owing to the extremely poor level of opposition he faced while making his way to the record; in contrast to Valero's opponents, just one of Brunson's 19 opponents had a winning record and six had failed to win a single fight in their careers.

Because of his punching power and perfect knockout ratio, Valero became a cult sensation in the community. His biggest backers in the sport included Doug Fischer of The Ring magazine (who, on the former boxing website he used to write for, Maxboxing.com, regularly covered Valero in his articles for the website, which also aired videos of his workouts and sparring sessions) and Boxing Inside with journalist Peter Palmiere. The Los Angeles local cable show also aired Valero's workouts, sparring sessions and interviews conducted by Palmiere.

In his first attempt at a world title, on 5 August 2006, Valero faced WBA super featherweight champion Vicente Mosquera. In what would arguably prove to be both boxers' toughest contest, Valero started out the match in signature fashion, knocking down the champion twice in the first round. However, Mosquera recovered and in the third round responded by knocking Valero down, which was to be Valero's only knockdown in his career. At this point in his 19–0 career, Valero's longest fight had only been two rounds, and the question remained as to whether the untested Valero had the stamina to go the distance. The answer came after ten grueling rounds when the ever-tenacious Mosquera finally started to wane under the challenger's continuous heavy-handed counters. Deciding Mosquera had received enough punishment, the referee called a halt to the match at 2:00 of round ten, making the 24-year-old Valero champion. Valero would go on to successfully defend the title four times before moving up in weight class, with his final defense a seventh-round stoppage of Takehiro Shimada in Tokyo on 12 June 2008.

On 3 September 2008, Valero vacated his WBA title to fight in the lightweight division. He fought Antonio Pitalua for the vacant WBC lightweight title on 4 April 2009, in Austin, Texas. The bout marked the first time Valero had fought in the United States since 2003. Pitalua came into the fight with 14 consecutive knockouts on his 46–3 record, and with Valero's 24 consecutive knockouts the stage was set for a decisive match between two heavy hitters. After an uneventful first round, Valero knocked Pitalua down just seconds into the second round with a right hook. Pitalua managed to get up but suffered two more knockdowns before the referee stopped the fight at 0:49 of round two.

Valero's next fight came on his home turf of Venezuela, in La Guaira, where he successfully defended his WBC lightweight title by a TKO victory over Hector Velasquez in the seventh round. Valero's second and final defense of the belt came against Antonio DeMarco in Mexico, on 6 February 2010. In the second round, Valero suffered a serious cut over his right eye after DeMarco landed an unintentional elbow. Valero was able to continue the fight and went on to win by corner retirement when DeMarco failed to answer the bell for the tenth round. This would be Valero's last match. In March 2010, Valero vacated his WBC title in order to compete in the light welterweight division. Valero's professional record at the time of his death was 27–0, making him one of the few world champions to finish their careers undefeated.

== Career roadblocks ==
On 5 February 2001, Valero was involved in a severe motorcycle accident in which he was not wearing a helmet. He fractured his skull and had surgery to remove a blood clot. This injury was sustained prior to his launching his pro career, and it created roadblocks to major bodies sanctioning his fights. Valero claimed that his doctor cleared him to fight on 17 January 2002, and he turned pro that July with a first-round KO.

Valero appeared to hit the jackpot when he was signed after his 12th pro fight by Golden Boy Promotions. Valero was scheduled to appear on HBO's Boxing After Dark, but in January 2004 he failed an MRI owing to brain scan irregularities in New York and thus was not allowed to fight in the United States; as a result, the fight did not take place. He continued to fight outside the US and on 25 March 2008, Valero was cleared to box in the state of Texas.

== Allegations of assault ==
It was reported on 27 September 2009, that Edwin Valero had been arrested on assault charges. A man alleged that the boxer attacked his mother and sister over a feud. Valero denied the allegations and considered them an attempt to harm his reputation. His mother came forward to tell the media that no foul play was involved.

On 25 March 2010, Valero was again accused of assault, this time by his wife, who was sent to hospital for bruises and a damaged lung. Valero denied any wrongdoing, stating his wife stumbled from a stairway, but investigators doubted him. His wife later told authorities that her injuries were caused by an accident on some stairs, despite the fact that she had been treated for similar injuries twice before at the hospital. Because of the vicious personality he showed at the hospital where his wife was treated, Valero was sent for six months of psychiatric rehabilitation.

== Death ==
On 18 April 2010, Valero was arrested after police found the body of his 24-year-old wife, Jennifer Carolina Viera de Valero, in a hotel in the city of Valencia, Carabobo. She had been stabbed three times. Valero was considered a suspect and was taken to jail. Valero allegedly admitted to hotel security and police that he had murdered his wife.

The day after being taken to jail, Valero was found hanging in his jail cell by his pants. He was pronounced legally dead at 1:30 am.

== In popular culture ==
Valero's life, his relationship with his wife and their deaths were dramatized in the 2016 film, El Inca, in which Valero was played by actor Alexander Leterni.

== Professional boxing record ==
27 fights	27 wins	0 losses
By knockout	27	0

No.	Result	Record	Opponent	Type	Round, time	Date	Location	Notes
27	Win	27–0	Antonio DeMarco	RTD	9 (12), 3:00	6 Feb 2010	Monterrey Arena, Monterrey, Mexico	Retained WBC lightweight title
26	Win	26–0	Héctor Velázquez	RTD	7 (12), 0:10	19 Dec 2009	Polideportivo José María Vargas, La Guaira, Venezuela	Retained WBC lightweight title
25	Win	25–0	Antonio Pitalúa	TKO	2 (12), 0:49	4 Apr 2009	Frank Erwin Center, Austin, Texas, U.S.	Won vacant WBC lightweight title
24	Win	24–0	Takehiro Shimada	TKO	7 (12), 1:55	12 Jun 2008	Nippon Budokan, Tokyo, Japan	Retained WBA super featherweight title
23	Win	23–0	Zaid Zavaleta	TKO	3 (12), 1:18	15 Dec 2007	Plaza de Toros, Cancún, Mexico	Retained WBA super featherweight title
22	Win	22–0	Nobuhito Honmo	TKO	8 (12), 1:54	3 May 2007	Ariake Coliseum, Tokyo, Japan	Retained WBA super featherweight title
21	Win	21–0	Michael Lozada	TKO	1 (12), 1:12	3 Jan 2007	Ariake Coliseum, Tokyo, Japan	Retained WBA super featherweight title
20	Win	20–0	Vicente Mosquera	TKO	10 (12), 2:00	5 Aug 2006	Figali Convention Center, Panama City, Panama	Won WBA super featherweight title
19	Win	19–0	Genaro Trazancos	TKO	2 (6), 1:48	25 Mar 2006	World Memorial Hall, Kobe, Japan	
18	Win	18–0	Whyber Garcia	TKO	1 (12), 2:57	25 Feb 2006	Centro Recreacional Yesterday, Turmero, Venezuela	Won WBA Fedelatin super featherweight title
17	Win	17–0	Aram Ramazyan	KO	1 (8), 0:20	5 Dec 2005	Palais Omnisports, Paris, France	
16	Win	16–0	Hero Bando	TKO	1 (6), 1:56	25 Sep 2005	Yokohama Arena, Yokohama, Japan	
15	Win	15–0	Jose Hernandez	KO	1 (10), 0:41	13 Aug 2005	Circulo Militar, Maracay, Venezuela	
14	Win	14–0	Esteban de Jesus Morales	KO	1 (10), 1:15	1 Jul 2005	Roberto Durán Arena, Panama City, Panama	
13	Win	13–0	Hernan Abraham Valenzuela	TKO	1 (10), 2:06	21 May 2005	Ce.De.M. N° 2, Buenos Aires, Argentina	
12	Win	12–0	Tomas Zambrano	TKO	1 (10), 1:45	18 Dec 2003	Marriott Hotel, Irvine, California, U.S.	
11	Win	11–0	Alejandro Heredia	KO	1 (10)	27 Oct 2003	Gimnasio José Beracasa, Caracas, Venezuela	
10	Win	10–0	Roque Cassiani	TKO	1 (8), 2:21	28 Aug 2003	Marriott Hotel, Irvine, California, U.S.	
9	Win	9–0	Emmanuel Ford	TKO	1 (6), 1:52	19 Jul 2003	Activity Center, Maywood, California, U.S.	
8	Win	8–0	Dairo Julio	TKO	1 (8)	23 May 2003	Hotel Tamanaco Intercontinental, Caracas, Venezuela	
7	Win	7–0	Edgar Mendoza	TKO	1 (8)	17 May 2003	Centro Recreacional Yesterday, Turmero, Venezuela	
6	Win	6–0	Danny Sandoval	KO	1 (8), 2:26	22 Mar 2003	Centro Recreacional Yesterday, Turmero, Venezuela	
5	Win	5–0	Julio Pineda	KO	1 (6), 1:57	30 Nov 2002	Caracas, Venezuela	
4	Win	4–0	Luis Soto	TKO	1 (6)	18 Nov 2002	Caracas, Venezuela	
3	Win	3–0	Angel Alirio Rivero	TKO	1 (4), 2:03	26 Oct 2002	Centro Recreacional Yesterday, Turmero, Venezuela	
2	Win	2–0	Danny Sandoval	TKO	1 (4)	23 Sep 2002	Caracas, Venezuela	
1	Win	1–0	Eduardo Hernandez	TKO	1 (4), 2:02	9 Jul 2002	Parque Naciones Unidas, Caracas, Venezuela	

== Titles in boxing ==
=== Major world titles ===
- WBA super featherweight champion (130 lbs)
- WBC lightweight champion (135 lbs)

=== Regional/International titles ===
- WBA Fedelatin super featherweight champion (130 lbs)

== See also ==
- Carlos Monzón
- Ali Raymi
- El Inca (film), a 2016 film about the life of Valero

Sporting positions
Regional boxing titles
Preceded by Whyber Garcia	WBA Fedelatin super featherweight champion 25 February 2006 – 5 August 2006; Won world title	Vacant Title next held by Santos Benavides
World boxing titles
Preceded by Vicente Mosquera	WBA super featherweight champion 5 August 2006 – 3 September 2008; Vacated	Vacant Title next held by Jorge Linares
Vacant Title last held by Manny Pacquiao	WBC lightweight champion 4 April 2009 – 9 February 2010; Status changed	Vacant Title next held by Humberto Soto
Records
Preceded by Young Otto; 15	Most consecutive first-round knockouts 18; 25 September 2006 – 29 March 2008	Succeeded by Tyrone Brunson; 19
Junior Light & Lightweight status
Preceded by Diego Corrales	Latest born world champion to die 19 April 2010 – present	Incumbent
Status (all weights)
Preceded by Diego Corrales	Latest born world champion to die April 19, 2010 – November 24, 2022	Succeeded by Moisés Fuentes
