= Daniel Estrada (boxer) =

Mexican boxer (born 1985)

Personal information
- Nickname: Tremendo
- Born: Pedro Daniel Estrada Espitia; 4 May 1985 (age 41) Iztapalapa, Mexico City, Mexico
- Height: 1.82 m (6 ft 0 in)
- Weight: Lightweight

Boxing career
- Reach: 188 cm (74 in)
- Stance: Orthodox

Boxing record
- Total fights: 37
- Wins: 32
- Win by KO: 24
- Losses: 4
- Draws: 1
- No contests: 0

Pedro Daniel Estrada Espitia (born 4 May 1985) is a Mexican professional boxer.

Pedro is the former WBC Silver lightweight Champion, WBC Youth World lightweight Champion, WBC FECARBOX lightweight Champion, WBC Continental Americas lightweight Champion and also the WBC Caribbean Boxing Federation (CABOFE) lightweight Champion.

He has lost to famous boxers such as the current WBC Lightweight Champion Omar Figueroa and WBO lightweight contender Kevin Mitchell.

== Early life ==
As a child Estrada would sell candy and wash car windows on the street, to help support his family.

== Professional career ==
His first loss was to undefeated lightweight prospect José Emilio Perea. On February 27, 2010, Daniel beat veteran Angel Alirio Rivero by 10th round T.K.O. in Guadalajara, Jalisco, Mexico.
