= Sergio Thompson =

Mexican boxer (born 1983)

Personal information
- Nickname: Yeyo
- Born: Sergio Fernando Díaz Santos; 29 October 1983 (age 42) Chetumal, Quintana Roo, Mexico
- Height: 1.65 m (5 ft 5 in)

Boxing career
- Reach: 173 cm (68 in)
- Stance: Orthodox

Boxing record
- Total fights: 35
- Wins: 30
- Win by KO: 26
- Losses: 5

Sergio Fernando Díaz Santos (born 29 October 1983) is a Mexican professional boxer.

== Professional career ==
On 17 August 2013, Thompson lost to Takashi Miura in Cancún for the WBC super featherweight title.

== Personal life ==
His birth name is Sergio Díaz Santos but he fights under the surname Thompson, which is his paternal grandmother's maiden name.
