= José Pedraza (boxer) =

Puerto Rican boxer (born 1989)

Personal information
- Nicknames: Sniper; Goldo
- Born: José Pedraza González; May 8, 1989 (age 37) Caguas, Puerto Rico
- Height: 5 ft 8 1/2 in (174 cm)
- Weight: Super featherweight; Lightweight; Light welterweight

Boxing career
- Reach: 70 1/2 in (179 cm)
- Stance: Ambidextrous

Boxing record
- Total fights: 37
- Wins: 29
- Win by KO: 14
- Losses: 7
- Draws: 1
Medal record
Men's amateur boxing
Representing Puerto Rico
World Championships
Silver medal – second place	2009 Milan	Lightweight
Boxing World Cup
Bronze medal – third place	2008 Moscow	Lightweight
Pan American Games
Bronze medal – third place	2007 Rio de Janeiro	Lightweight
Central American and Caribbean Games
Gold medal – first place	2010 Mayagüez	Lightweight

José Pedraza González (born May 8, 1989) is a Puerto Rican professional boxer. He won world championships in two weight divisions, having held the International Boxing Federation (IBF) super featherweight title from 2015 to 2017, and the World Boxing Organization (WBO) lightweight title in 2018.

As an amateur he represented Puerto Rico, winning medals in multiple international competitions. Among the awards he achieved are a bronze medal at the 2007 Pan American Games, silver at the 2009 World Championships and gold at the 2010 Central American and Caribbean Games, as well as participation in the 2008 Summer Olympics.

== Amateur career ==
=== Early career and Pan American Games ===
Pedraza participated in the 2006 Copa La Romana. In the quarter finals he defeated Javier Fortuna (27:5). He secured the bronze medal with a 12:9 victory over V.Castillo of Ecuador. Pedraza won the tournament's gold medal over localist boxer Jonathan Batista (10:5). In December, he won the lightweight national championship, defeating Hector Marengo (18:15) in the finals of the Torneo Nacional Isaac Barrientos. On February 4, 2007, Pedraza debuted in the Pan American Games Qualifier defeating Oscar Diaz of the Dominican Republic (13:6). He qualified to the event by winning the bronze medal, losing (16:8) to localist Lisandro Bolivar in the semifinals. On March 31, 2007, Pedraza participated in a dual against Trinidad, winning (26:19) a contest over Jules De Gannes. He entered the IX Torneo José "Cheo" Aponte, debuting with a victory over Shemuel Pagan of the United States. Pedraza won the event's silver medal, losing to Jean Gomis by hit count after the contest finished tied 8:8. At the Pan American Games, he debuted winning (26:7) his preliminary over Jose Virula Lopez of Guatemala. Pedraza advanced to the medal round defeating Lisandro Bolivar of Venezuela. He won the tournament's bronze medal, losing (7:2) to local Everton Lopes. Pedraza entered the 2007 World Amateur Boxing Championships, but lost (25:17) his preliminary contest against Sadam Ali. He closed the year participating in a dual against France, losing (15:5) to Daouda Sow.

=== Summer Olympics and World Cup ===
In January 2008, Pedraza defended the lightweight national championship, defeating Reynaldo Ojeda (20:11) in the finals of the Torneo Nacional Isaac Barrientos. At the American Olympic Qualifier, he debuted with a 20:4 victory over Valentino Knowles of Bahamas. In the quarterfinals he lost (13:5) to Yordenis Ugas. In April 2008, he entered the second American Olympic Qualifier, stopping Omar Ward of Barbados in the second round of his preliminary. He was guaranteed a medal after defeating (15:8) Juan Cuellar of Argentina. In the semifinals, Pedraza stopped Alexis Folleco of Ecuador in the third round. He won the tournament's gold medal and qualified for the 2008 Summer Olympics by defeating Lopes in a rematch. Pedraza debuted in the X Torneo José "Cheo" Aponte with a victory (19:8) over countryman Alberto Mercado. In the finals he defeated Shemuel Pagan of the United States by walkover. Prior to the Olympics Pedraza participated in the XXXVIII International Golden Belt Tournament, advancing to the semifinals before losing (37:25) to Vladimir Saruhanyan of Russia. As part of their training the boxing team moved to South Korea, in order to adapt to the time-zone. After training and participating in a series of exhibition matches, the team traveled from Corea to Beijin.

In his first Olympic fight, Pedraza defeated Onur Şipal of Turkey by points, with scores of 10–3. Throughout the event, his strategy focused on maintaining a solid defense while connecting combinations to his opponent's body. Pedraza lost his second preliminary to Daouda Sow of France by points, 13:9. He entered the 2008 Boxing World Cup, advancing to the semifinals with an 8:2 win over Georgian Popescu of Romania. He won the bronze medal, losing (14:4) his next contest to Albert Selimov of Russia. In February 2008, Pedraza defended the lightweight national championship in the Torneo Nacional Isaac Barrientos, defeating Reynaldo Cintron in the preliminaries, Erick Vidal in the quarterfinals (WO), Edgardo Rivera in the semifinals and Ken Alvarez in the final (10:3). In May 2009, he entered the XII Torneo José "Cheo" Aponte and competed in the light welterweight limit, winning his first contest over Pedro Vicente by stoppage in three rounds. Pedraza won the silver medal, losing to Bernard Lebron in the finals by hit score following a 16:16 tie.

=== World medalist and regional championship ===
At the 2009 World Amateur Boxing Championships, Pedraza debuted by defeating Abdlay Anarbay of Kazakhstan (10:4). In his second contest, he defeated Zorigtbaataryn Enkhzorig of Mongolia (4:3). In the third date Pedraza defeated (6:5) Ljubomir Marjanovic of Serbia. A medal was secured with a (14:4) victory over Serdar Khudayberdiyev of Turkey in the quarterfinals. He advanced winning his contest against Albert Selimov, 9:5. In the finals, he lost a decision (9:4) to localist Domenico Valentino, winning the silver medal. In December 2009, Pedraza participated in the AIBA Presidents Cup, winning in his debut over Enkhzorig Zorigtbaatar. He lost a 21 decision to Semen Grivachev in the semifinals. An invitation was extended to him and the Arroyo brothers to participate in the World Series of Boxing, but it was declined. In January 2010, Pedraza defended the lightweight national championship in the finals of the Torneo Nacional Isaac Barrientos, defeating Jorge Maysonet, Jr. (4:3) in the quarterfinals, Jose Davila (3:2) in the semifinals and Edgardo Lopez in the finals. In April 2010, he defeated Davila (5:3) in the national team's selection meeting. In May 2010, he entered the XIII Torneo José "Cheo" Aponte, defeating Antonio Ortiz in the semifinals and Davila (5:0) in the final. He entered the 2010 Copa Olimpica, defeating Antonio Ortiz by points. In June 2010, Pedraza participated in the 2010 Pan-American Championships, debuting with a 14:1 victory over Joan Gonzalez of Venezuela. In the semifinals he defeated Erick Bonez (7:0). Pedraza won the silver medal, losing (8:3) to Yasnier Toledo Lopez in the final. In July he participated in the 2010 Central American and Caribbean Games, debuting with a 22:7 victory over Angel Gutierrez of Mexico. Pedraza advanced stopping Omar Ward in the second round. He defeated (10:1) Wellington Arias of the Dominican Republic in the semifinals. Pedraza won the old medal with a 10:2 victory over Cesar Villarraga of Colombia. On December 3, 2010, Pedraza participated in a dual against the United States defeating Duran Caferro, 16:3.

== Professional career ==
=== Early career ===
Pedraza's intention to become a professional was made public on January 3, 2011. A press conference was held a week later, where he signed a contract with three different promoters, Universal Promotions of Puerto Rico, Gary Shaw Productions and DiBella Entertainment, who agreed to co-promote his career. His professional debut was scheduled for February 18, 2011. The opponent was Felix Rivera, who also debuted after compiling an amateur record of 68–5. Pedraza won the contest by technical knockout in the first round, following a combination to the head and body. The following month he participated in his first contest outside of Puerto Rico, defeating Corben Page in the same manner. On June 10, 2011, Pedraza was included in a boxing card held prior to the Puerto Rican Day Parade, a tradition among the diaspora in New York. The contest was stopped in the first round, following two knockdowns over his opponent, Tomi Archambault. The opponent for his first six-round fight was Pedro Antonio Salcedo. Pedraza outboxed and injured Salcedo several times, earning a unanimous decision, with identical scores of 60–54. Following a short hiatus, he defeated John Wampash by technical knockout in the fourth round. On December 30, 2011, only ten months after his debut, Pedraza participated in his first titular match, challenging for the World Boxing Council's Super Featherweight Youth World Championship. He won by technical knockout in the fifth round, when the referee retired an injured Herbert Quartey from the contest. He headlined Team Puerto Rico's first local card of 2012, "Pa' Bravo Yo", defeating Anthony Woods in the fourth round after his opponent's corner submitted the contest by throwing a towel into the ring.

=== IBF super-featherweight champion ===
On June 13, 2015, Pedraza captured the vacant International Boxing Federation junior lightweight world championship by defeating Russia's Andrey Klimov via unanimous decision. Pedraza successfully defended his championship twice, against Edner Cherry and Stephen Smith.

On January 14, 2017, he lost his IBF title to Gervonta Davis by seventh-round technical knockout.

=== Lightweight ===
On October 30, 2017, it was announced that Pedraza was now being managed by Victory Sports. It was also announced that Pedraza would now campaign in the lightweight division. On March 2, Top Rank announced they had signed Pedraza to a multi-fight promotional agreement.

March 17, Pedraza made his lightweight and Top Rank debut at Hulu Theater at Madison Square Garden, outpointing Jose Luis Rodriguez.

=== WBO lightweight champion ===
On August 25, 2018, Pedraza knocked Raymundo Beltrán down in the eleventh round and beat him by unanimous decision, with scores of 117–110, 117–110 and 115–112, to win the WBO lightweight title and become a two-division world champion.

Pedraza's next fight was a unification bout on December 8, 2018, against WBA (Super) and The Ring lightweight champion Vasiliy Lomachenko. Pedraza lost by unanimous decision, with scores of 117–109, 117–109 and 119–107.

==== Pedraza vs. Lozara Jr ====
In his next fight, Pedraza fought Antonio Lozada Jr, who was ranked #13 by the WBC at lightweight. Pedraza won the fight via a ninth-round TKO.

==== Pedraza vs. Zepeda ====
In his next fight, Pedraza fought Jose Zepeda. Zepeda was ranked #9 by the WBC. Zepeda started off the fight strong. Pedraza fought his way back into at later in the fight, but it was not enough as Zepeda did enough through most of the rounds to earn the unanimous decision victory.

==== Pedraza vs. LesPierre ====
On July 2, 2020, Pedraza fought Mikkel LesPierre. Pedraza dominated his opponent and dropped him twice en route to a convincing unanimous decision victory.

=== Post-championship ===
==== Pedraza vs. Davis ====
On February 8, 2024 in Las Vegas, Pedraza was defeated by Keyshawn Davis by TKO in the sixth round.

==== Pedraza vs. Mercado ====
Pedraza is scheduled to face Ernesto Mercado in Las Vegas on January 25, 2025.

== Professional boxing record ==
37 fights	29 wins	7 losses
By knockout	14	3
By decision	15	4
Draws	1	

No.	Result	Record	Opponent	Type	Round, time	Date	Location	Notes
37	Loss	29–7–1	Ernesto Mercado	TKO	4 (10), 2:08	Jan 25, 2025	The Cosmopolitan, Paradise, Nevada, U.S.	
36	Loss	29–6–1	Keyshawn Davis	TKO	6 (10), 1:09	Feb 8, 2024	Michelob Ultra Arena, Paradise, Nevada, U.S.	For WBO Inter-Continental, WBC USNBC and vacant IBF USBA lightweight titles
35	Loss	29–5–1	Arnold Barboza Jr.	UD	10	Feb 3, 2023	Desert Diamond Arena, Glendale, Arizona, U.S.	For WBO Inter-Continental light welterweight title
34	Draw	29–4–1	Richard Commey	SD	10	Aug 27, 2022	Hard Rock Hotel & Casino, Tulsa, Oklahoma, U.S.	
33	Loss	29–4	José Ramírez	UD	12	Mar 4, 2022	Save Mart Center, Fresno, California, U.S.	For vacant WBO International light welterweight title
32	Win	29–3	Julian Rodriguez	RTD	8 (10), 3:00	Jun 12, 2021	Virgin Hotels Las Vegas, Paradise, Nevada, U.S.	
31	Win	28–3	Javier Molina	UD	10	Sep 19, 2020	MGM Grand Conference Center, Paradise, Nevada, U.S.	
30	Win	27–3	Mikkel LesPierre	UD	10	Jul 2, 2020	MGM Grand Conference Center, Paradise, Nevada, U.S.	
29	Loss	26–3	Jose Zepeda	UD	10	Sep 14, 2019	T-Mobile Arena, Paradise, Nevada, U.S.	
28	Win	26–2	Antonio Lozada Jr.	TKO	9 (10), 2:34	May 25, 2019	Osceola Heritage Park, Kissimmee, Florida, U.S.	Won vacant WBO Latino lightweight title]]
27	Loss	25–2	Vasiliy Lomachenko	UD	12	Dec 8, 2018	Hulu Theater, New York City, New York, U.S.	Lost WBO lightweight title; For WBA (Super) and The Ring lightweight titles
26	Win	25–1	Raymundo Beltrán	UD	12	Aug 25, 2018	Gila River Arena, Glendale, Arizona, U.S.	Won WBO lightweight title
25	Win	24–1	Antonio Morán	UD	10	Jun 9, 2018	MGM Grand Garden Arena, Paradise, Nevada, U.S.	Won WBO Latino lightweight title]]
24	Win	23–1	José Luis Rodríguez	UD	8	Mar 17, 2018	Hulu Theater, New York City, New York, U.S.	
23	Loss	22–1	Gervonta Davis	TKO	7 (12), 2:36	Jan 14, 2017	Barclays Center, New York City, New York, U.S.	Lost IBF super featherweight title
22	Win	22–0	Stephen Smith	UD	12	Apr 16, 2016	Mohegan Sun Arena, Montville, Connecticut, U.S.	Retained IBF super featherweight title
21	Win	21–0	Edner Cherry	SD	12	Oct 3, 2015	U.S. Bank Arena, Cincinnati, Ohio, U.S.	Retained IBF super featherweight title
20	Win	20–0	Andrey Klimov	UD	12	Jun 13, 2015	Bartow Arena, Birmingham, Alabama, U.S.	Won vacant IBF super featherweight title
19	Win	19–0	Michael Farenas	UD	12	Nov 14, 2014	Coliseo Roberto Clemente, San Juan, Puerto Rico	
18	Win	18–0	Juan Carlos Martinez	RTD	6 (10), 3:00	Aug 15, 2014	Chumash Casino, Santa Ynez, California, U.S.	
17	Win	17–0	Arturo Uruzquieta	TKO	1 (6), 2:19	Jun 7, 2014	Madison Square Garden, New York City, New York, U.S.	
16	Win	16–0	Alberto Garza	UD	12	Mar 22, 2014	Morongo Casino Resort & Spa, Cabazon, California, U.S.	Won IBO super featherweight title
15	Win	15–0	Alejandro Rodriguez	KO	3 (10), 0:48	Oct 26, 2013	Estadio Jesús M. Freire, Cidra, Puerto Rico	
14	Win	14–0	Gabriel Tolmajyan	UD	10	Aug 9, 2013	Morongo Casino Resort & Spa, Cabazon, California, U.S.	Won vacant IBF-USBA super featherweight title]]
13	Win	13–0	Sergio Villanueva	TKO	7 (10), 2:59	Jun 8, 2013	Bell Centre, Montreal, Quebec, Canada	
12	Win	12–0	Gerardo Zayas	TKO	1 (8)	Feb 23, 2013	Auditorio Juan Pachín Vicéns, Ponce, Puerto Rico	
11	Win	11–0	Tevin Farmer	TKO	8 (8), 0:47	Oct 12, 2012	Ameristar Casino, Saint Charles, Missouri, U.S.	
10	Win	10–0	Jose Valderrama	UD	8	Aug 31, 2012	Guillermo Angulo Coliseum, Carolina, Puerto Rico	
9	Win	9–0	Carlos Claudio	UD	8	Jun 15, 2012	Mario 'Quijote' Morales Coliseum, Guaynabo, Puerto Rico	
8	Win	8–0	Gil Garcia	UD	8	Apr 27, 2012	Buffalo Run Casino, Miami, Oklahoma, U.S.	
7	Win	7–0	Anthony Woods	TKO	4 (8), 2:30	Feb 24, 2012	Salvador Dijols Coliseum, Ponce, Puerto Rico	
6	Win	6–0	Herbert Quartey	TKO	5 (8), 1:20	Dec 30, 2011	Morongo Casino Resort & Spa, Cabazon, California, U.S.	Won vacant WBC Youth super featherweight title
5	Win	5–0	John Wampash	KO	4 (6), 2:11	Nov 11, 2011	Cohen Stadium, El Paso, Texas, U.S.	
4	Win	4–0	Pedro Antonio Salcedo	UD	6	Aug 19, 2011	Auditorio Juan Pachín Vicéns, Ponce, Puerto Rico	
3	Win	3–0	Tomi Archambault	TKO	1 (4), 2:21	Jun 10, 2011	Roseland Ballroom, New York City, New York, U.S.	
2	Win	2–0	Corben Page	TKO	1 (4), 2:25	Mar 29, 2011	BB King Blues Club & Grill, New York City, New York, U.S.	
1	Win	1–0	Felix Rivera	TKO	1 (4), 1:25	Feb 18, 2011	Auditorio Juan Pachín Vicéns, Ponce, Puerto Rico	

== Titles in boxing ==
=== Major world titles ===
- IBF super featherweight champion (130 lbs)
- WBO lightweight champion (135 lbs)

=== Major world titles ===
- IBO super featherweight champion (130 lbs)

=== Regional/International titles ===
- IBF-USBA super featherweight champion (130 lbs)
- WBC Youth super featherweight champion (130 lbs)
- WBO Latino lightweight champion (135 lbs) (2x)

== See also ==
- List of super-featherweight boxing champions
- List of lightweight boxing champions
- List of IBF world champions
- List of WBO world champions
- List of IBO world champions
- List of Puerto Rican boxing world champions

Sporting positions
Regional boxing titles
Vacant Title last held by Argenis Mendez	USBA super featherweight champion August 9, 2013 – June 13, 2015; Won IBF title	Vacant Title next held by Jamel Herring
Minor world boxing titles
Vacant Title last held by Will Tomlinson	IBO super featherweight champion March 22, 2014 – 2014; Vacated	Vacant Title next held by Jack Asis
Major world boxing titles
Vacant Title last held by Rances Barthelemy	IBF super featherweight champion June 13, 2015 – January 14, 2017	Succeeded by Gervonta Davis
Vacant Title last held by Ray Beltran	WBO lightweight champion August 25, 2018 – December 8, 2018	Succeeded by Vasiliy Lomachenko
