= Mykola Kovalchuk =

President of the World Boxing Council Ukraine

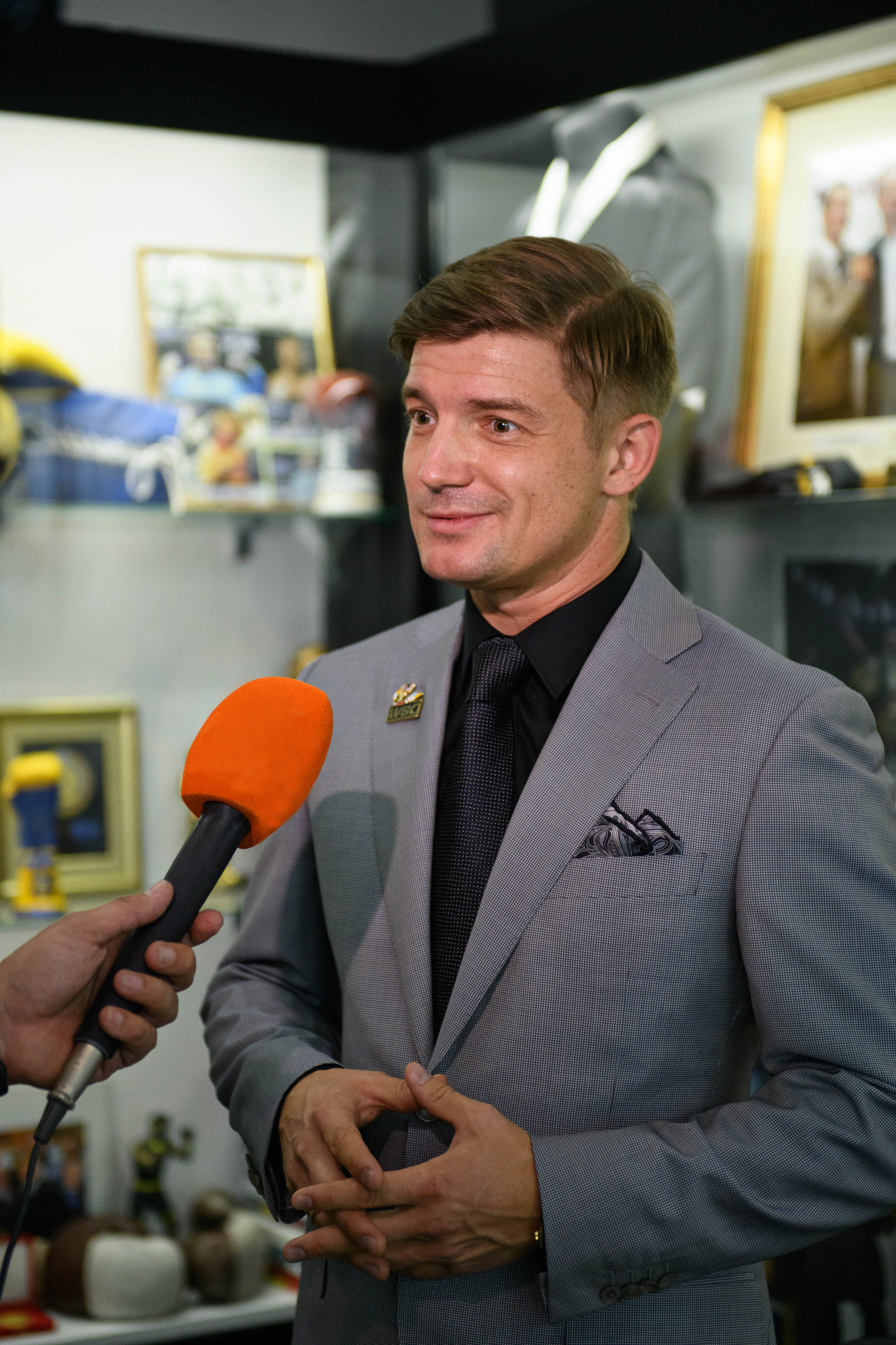

1st President of the World Boxing Council Ukraine
- Incumbent
- Assumed office 2021
- Preceded by: Position established

Executive director of WBC Cares Ukraine

Personal details
- Born: April 17, 1984 (age 42) Ivano-Frankivsk, Ukraine
- Occupation: President of the world boxing council ukraine (wbc)
- Profession: Lawyer, sports official
- Sports career
- Sport: Boxing, professional boxing

Mykola Kovalchuk (Ukrainian: Ковальчук Микола Миколайович; born April 17, 1984, in Ivano-Frankivsk, Ukraine) is a Ukrainian lawyer and sports administrator in professional boxing. He is the founder and president of the official representative office of the World Boxing Council Ukraine (WBC). He also serves as the executive director of the charitable organization WBC Cares Ukraine.

== Career ==
Since 2021, Mykola Kovalchuk has served as president of the Ukrainian branch of the World Boxing Council (WBC), one of the world's leading boxing federations with representation in 178 countries. In this capacity, he has worked to strengthen the boxing infrastructure in Ukraine and promote the sport internationally.

He also acts as the executive director of the charitable initiative WBC Cares Ukraine, which supports disadvantaged social groups across the country.

Kovalchuk is a member of the supervisory board of the National League of Professional Boxing of Ukraine. He played a role in organizing the 2024 Peace Summit in Switzerland, held in collaboration with the Office of the President of Ukraine and the Ministry of Youth and Sports of Ukraine.

== See also ==
- World Boxing Council (WBC)
- World Boxing Council Ukraine (WBC Ukraine)
