= Andrey Klimov (boxer) =

Russian boxer (born 1982)

Personal information
- Nationality: Russian
- Born: Andrey Klimov; 26 July 1982 (age 44) Klimovsk, Russia
- Height: 5 ft 10 in (178 cm)
- Weight: Lightweight

Boxing career
- Reach: 72 in (183 cm)
- Stance: Orthodox

Boxing record
- Total fights: 26
- Wins: 20
- Win by KO: 10
- Losses: 6

Andrey Klimov (born 26 July 1982) is a Russian professional boxer who challenged for the IBF super-featherweight title in 2015.

== Professional career ==
=== Klimov vs. Crawford ===
Klimov won the first 16 fights of his career, before losing a unanimous decision to Terence Crawford on 5 October 2013.

=== Klimov vs. Pedraza ===
On 13 June 2015, he fought José Pedraza and lost by unanimous decision, 120-108, 120-108 and 119-109 in favor of Pedraza.

=== Klimov vs. Walsh ===
In his next bout, Klimov fought Liam Walsh in a final eliminator for the IBF world super featherweight title. Walsh won convincingly on the scorecards, 120-107, 120-107 and 119-108.

== Professional boxing record ==
25 fights	20 wins	5 losses
By knockout	10	1
By decision	10	4

Result	Record	Opponent	Type	Round, time	Date	Location	Notes
Loss	20–5	(Argentina) Fabián Maidana	KO	7 (10)	Jul 28, 2018	Staples Center, Los Angeles, United States	
Win	20–4	(Georgia (country)) Ruben Movsesiani	TKO	2 (10)	Sep 30, 2017	Sport Service, Podolsk, Russia	
Loss	19–4	(United States) Alejandro Luna	UD	10	Apr 9, 2017	(United States) The Novo at L.A. Live, Los Angeles	
Loss	19–3	(United Kingdom) Liam Walsh	UD	12	Oct 8, 2016	(United Kingdom) Harrow Leisure Centre, Harrow, UK	
Loss	19–2	(Puerto Rico) Jose Pedraza	UD	12	Jun 13, 2015	(United States) Bartow Arena, Birmingham, U.S.	For vacant IBF super-featherweight title
Win	19–1	(Mexico) Gabino Cota	UD	10	Nov 28, 2014	Luzhniki, Moscow, Russia	
Win	18–1	(Mexico) Guillermo Avila	RTD	8 (10)	Aug 1, 2014	(United States) A La Carte Event Pavilion, Tampa, U.S.	
Win	17–1	(Dominican Republic) Francisco Contreras	UD	12	Apr 25, 2014	(Russia) Dynamo Palace of Sports in Krylatskoye, Moscow	Won vacant WBO Inter-Continental super-featherweight title.
