= Ray Beltrán =

Mexican boxer (born 1981)

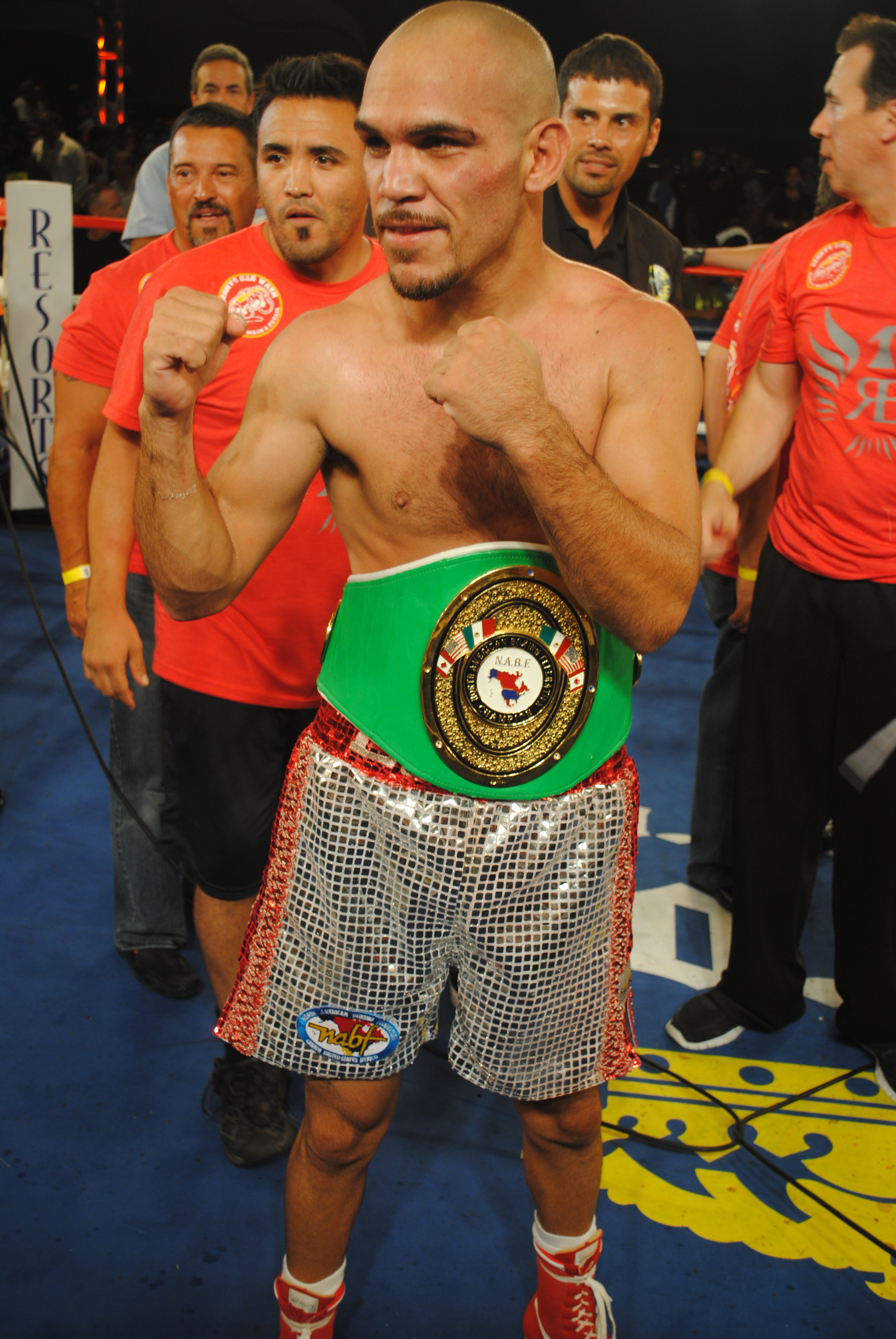
- Beltrán with the WBC–NABF lightweight title, 2012

Personal information
- Nickname: Sugar
- Born: Raymundo Beltrán; July 23, 1981 (age 45) Los Mochis, Sinaloa, Mexico
- Height: 5 ft 8 in (173 cm)
- Weight: Featherweight; Super featherweight; Lightweight; Light welterweight

Boxing career
- Reach: 71 in (180 cm)
- Stance: Orthodox

Boxing record
- Total fights: 48
- Wins: 37
- Win by KO: 23
- Losses: 9
- Draws: 1
- No contests: 1

Raymundo Beltrán (born July 23, 1981) is a Mexican professional boxer. He held the WBO lightweight title in 2018.

== Professional career ==
Born in Los Mochis, Sinaloa, Mexico, Beltrán beat the veteran Moises Pérez to win the WBC Continental Americas Super Featherweight Championship in March 2008.

=== Beltran vs. Lundy ===
In July 2012, Beltran, trained by Freddie Roach and a sparring partner of Manny Pacquiao, won the WBC NABF Lightweight title in an upset with a majority ten-round decision over the WBC number one lightweight contender Henry Lundy. Before the bout, Lundy had to weigh in four times to make the 135 pound limit. Beltran, in top condition, came forward more aggressively and landed more punches overall by the CompuBox statistics. With the win, Beltran won the opportunity to fight the winner of Antonio DeMarco versus John Molina for the WBC Lightweight title for the title later in 2012. Beltran defeated Ji-Hoon Kim by unanimous decision to retain the NABF lightweight title in December 2012.

=== Beltran vs. Burns ===
WBO Lightweight titleholder Ricky Burns' promoter Eddie Hearn announced a title defence against Beltran at the Scottish Exhibition and Conference Centre on September 7, 2013. Beltran knocked down Burns in the 8th round. The bout ended in a controversial split-decision draw. Many observers believed Beltran had clearly won, Burns fought on from as early as the second round with a broken Jaw and the draw was awarded. Burns then granted Beltran a rematch but boxing bosses cancelled the proposed rematch instead favoring a bout with the undefeated Terrance Crawford to be Burns next opponent. Beltran has since been critical of the Scot despite being granted a rematch claiming that he "whooped" Burns and "beat him clear".

=== Beltran vs. Pedraza ===
On 25 August 2018, Beltran defended his WBO title for the first time, against Jose Pedraza, ranked #2 by the WBO at lightweight. Beltran lost the fight convincingly on the scorecards, with all three judges scoring it favor of Pedraza, 117–110, 117-110 and 115–112.

=== Beltran vs. Okada ===
In his next fight, Beltran fought Hiroki Okada, then ranked #2 by the WBO, #3 by the WBA, #5 by the IBF and #10 by the WBC at super lightweight. In an action-filled fight, Beltran managed to outbox Okada and finish him in the ninth round.

=== Beltran vs. Commey ===
On 28 June 2019, Beltran was scheduled to fight Richard Commey for Commey's IBF lightweight title. Beltran, however, failed to make weight before the fight and Commey's belt was ultimately not at stake. On fight night, Commey managed to drop Beltran four times before finishing him in the eighth round via TKO.

== Professional boxing record ==
48 fights	37 wins	9 losses
By knockout	23	3
By decision	13	6
By disqualification	1	0
Draws	1	
No contests	1	

No.	Result	Record	Opponent	Type	Round, time	Date	Location	Notes
48	Win	37–9–1 (1)	Edgar Ramirez	RTD	6 (10), 3:00	Oct 1, 2021	Glendale Civic Center, Glendale, Arizona, U.S.	
47	Loss	36–9–1 (1)	Richard Commey	KO	8 (12), 0:54	Jun 28, 2019	Pechanga Resort & Casino, Temecula, California, U.S.	
46	Win	36–8–1 (1)	Hiroki Okada	KO	9 (10), 2:09	Feb 10, 2019	Save Mart Center, Fresno, California, U.S.	Won WBC Continental Americas and WBO Inter-Continental light welterweight titles
45	Loss	35–8–1 (1)	José Pedraza	UD	12	Aug 25, 2018	Gila River Arena, Glendale, Arizona, U.S.	Lost WBO lightweight title
44	Win	35–7–1 (1)	Paulus Moses	UD	12	Feb 16, 2018	Grand Sierra Resort, Grand Theatre, Reno, Nevada, U.S.	Won vacant WBO lightweight title
43	Win	34–7–1 (1)	Bryan Vázquez	MD	10	Aug 5, 2017	Microsoft Theater, Los Angeles, California, U.S.	
42	Win	33–7–1 (1)	Jonathan Maicelo	KO	2 (12), 1:25	May 20, 2017	Madison Square Garden, New York City, New York, U.S.	
41	Win	32–7–1 (1)	Mason Menard	KO	7 (10), 0:51	Dec 10, 2016	CenturyLink Center, Omaha, Nebraska, U.S.	
39	Win	30–7–1 (1)	Ivan Najera	TKO	2 (8), 2:58	May 21, 2016	Laredo Energy Arena, Laredo, Texas, U.S.	
38	NC	29–7–1 (1)	Takahiro Ao	ND	2 (12), 1:29	May 1, 2015	The Cosmopolitan of Las Vegas, Paradise, Nevada, U.S.	Originally a TKO win for Beltrán, later ruled an NC after he failed a drug test
37	Loss	29–7–1	Terence Crawford	UD	12	Nov 29, 2014	CenturyLink Center, Omaha, Nebraska, U.S.	For WBO and vacant The Ring lightweight titles
36	Win	29–6–1	Arash Usmanee	UD	12	Apr 12, 2014	MGM Grand Garden Arena, Paradise, Nevada, U.S.	Won vacant WBO–NABO lightweight title
35	Draw	28–6–1	Ricky Burns	SD	12	Sep 7, 2013	Exhibition and Conference Centre, Glasgow, Scotland	For WBO lightweight title
34	Win	28–6	Alejandro Rodriguez	UD	10	Apr 27, 2013	Erwin Center, Austin, Texas, U.S.	
33	Win	27–6	Kim Ji-hoon	UD	10	Dec 6, 2012	Mirage Hotel & Casino, Las Vegas, Nevada, U.S.	Retained WBC-NABF lightweight title
32	Win	26–6	Hank Lundy	MD	10	Jul 27, 2012	Resorts Casino Hotel, Atlantic City, New Jersey, U.S.	Won WBC-NABF lightweight title
31	Loss	25–6	Luis Ramos Jr.	UD	10	Jan 6, 2012	Fantasy Springs Casino, Indio, U.S.	
30	Win	25–5	Darien Ford	KO	2 (8)	Sep 9, 2011	Desert Diamond Casino, Tucson, U.S.	
29	Loss	24–5	Sharif Bogere	UD	10	May 13, 2011	Buffalo Bill's Star Arena, Primm, U.S.	For vacant WBO-NABO lightweight title
28	Win	24–4	Carlos Vinan	RTD	7 (12), 3:00	Mar 4, 2011	Warner Center Marriott, Woodland Hills, U.S.	
27	Win	23–4	David Torres	TKO	7 (10), 2:20	Jan 9, 2010	Emerald Queen Casino, Tacoma, U.S.	
26	Loss	22–4	Ammeth Diaz	TKO	5 (11), 0:48	Sep 18, 2008	Centro de Convenciones Figali, Panama City, Panama	For WBA Fedelatin lightweight title
25	Win	22–3	Moises Perez	TKO	9 (12), 2:42	Mar 8, 2008	Plaza de Toros, Cancun, Mexico	Won vacant WBC Continental Americas super featherweight title
24	Win	21–3	Baudel Cardenas	KO	2 (10), 2:59	Sep 29, 2007	Arco Arena, Sacramento, California, U.S.	
23	Win	20–3	Jose Montes	TKO	1 (10), 2:10	Jul 20, 2007	Forum del Mayo, Navojoa, Sonora, Mexico	
22	Win	19–3	Carlos Gamez	TKO	2 (10), 2:22	Mar 2, 2007	Forum del Mayo, Navojoa, Sonora, Mexico	
21	Win	18–3	Joel Yocupicio	RTD	1 (8), 3:00	Oct 13, 2006	Auditorio Benito Juarez, Los Mochis, Sinaloa, Mexico	
20	Win	17–3	Jaime Orrantia	TKO	1 (8), 1:43	Jul 9, 2005	Convention Center, Tucson, Arizona, U.S.	
19	Loss	16–3	Agnaldo Nunes	SD	8	Mar 25, 2005	Desert Diamond Casino, Phoenix, Arizona, U.S.	
18	Win	16–2	Jaime Orrantia	UD	6	Dec 16, 2004	Olympic Auditorium, Los Angeles, California, U.S.	
17	Win	15–2	Ivan Cazarez	TKO	4 (6), 1:27	Sep 3, 2004	Desert Diamond Casino, Phoenix, Arizona, U.S.	
16	Win	14–2	Roque Cassiani	UD	8	Jun 24, 2004	Bren Events Center, Irvine, California, U.S.	
15	Win	13–2	Freddy Castro	MD	6	Jan 22, 2004	Marriott Hotel, Irvine, California, U.S.	
14	Win	12–2	Edel Ruiz	UD	10	Feb 7, 2003	The Palace, Auburn Hills, Michigan, U.S.	
13	Win	11–2	Sean Fletcher	DQ	9 (10), 1:50	Nov 19, 2002	Dodge Theater, Phoenix, Arizona, U.S.	
12	Win	10–2	Carlos Diaz	TKO	2 (12), 1:16	Oct 1, 2002	Dodge Theater, Phoenix, Arizona, U.S.	Won vacant WBC FECARBOX featherweight title
11	Win	9–2	Carlos Rocha	TKO	1	Apr 19, 2002	Auburn Hills, U.S.	
10	Win	8–2	Wilson Santos	KO	1 (8)	Dec 14, 2001	PA Convention Center, Philadelphia, Pennsylvania, U.S.	
9	Win	7–2	Guillermo Vara	TKO	2 (6), 2:52	Nov 23, 2001	The Palace, Auburn Hills, Michigan, U.S.	
8	Win	6–2	Robert Enriquez	TKO	1 (6), 2:01	Oct 14, 2001	Veteran's Memorial Coliseum, Phoenix, Arizona, U.S.	
7	Loss	5–2	Steve Trumble	TKO	4 (4), 0:22	May 26, 2001	Van Andel Arena, Grand Rapids, Michigan, U.S.	
6	Win	5–1	Francisco Rodriguez	TKO	3 (4), 1:41	Apr 7, 2001	MGM Grand Garden Arena, Paradise, Nevada, U.S.	
5	Win	4–1	Juan Carlos Martinez	PTS	4	Jan 8, 2000	University Arena, Albuquerque, New Mexico, U.S.	
4	Win	3–1	Joel Padilla	UD	4	Dec 17, 1999	Celebrity Theater, Phoenix, Arizona, U.S.	
3	Loss	2–1	Victor Manuel Mendoza	SD	4	Dec 4, 1999	Bush Co. Tent, Phoenix, Arizona, U.S.	
2	Win	2–0	Rafael Magana	TKO	3 (4), 2:18	Nov 6, 1999	Bush Co. Tent, Phoenix, Arizona, U.S.	
1	Win	1–0	Victor Manuel Mendoza	UD	4	Jul 2, 1999	Convention Center, Tucson, Arizona, U.S.	

== See also ==
- List of Mexican boxing world champions

Regional boxing titles
Preceded by Mason Menard	NABO lightweight champion December 10, 2016 – February 16, 2018; Won world title	Vacant Title next held by Mercito Gesta
World boxing titles
Vacant Title last held by Terry Flanagan	WBO lightweight champion February 16, 2018 – August 25, 2018	Succeeded by José Pedraza
