= Sharif Bogere =

Ugandan boxer

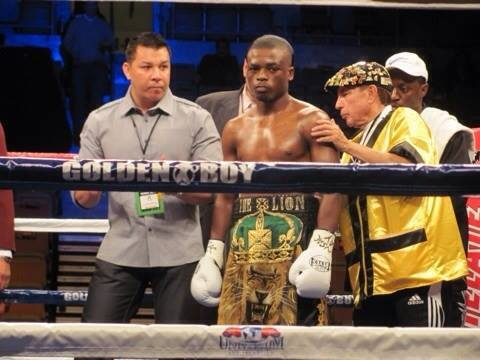
- Sharif Bogere in the Golden Boy ring, November 2013.

Personal information
- Nicknames: The Lion; Lion Warrior
- Nationality: Ugandan
- Born: October 8, 1988 (age 37) Uganda
- Height: 5 ft 6 1/2 in (169 cm)
- Weight: Lightweight

Boxing career
- Reach: 68 in (173 cm)
- Stance: Orthodox

Boxing record
- Total fights: 35
- Wins: 32
- Win by KO: 20
- Losses: 2
- Draws: 0
- No contests: 1

Sharif Bogere (born October 8, 1988) is a Ugandan professional boxer in the Lightweight division. He is a one-time WBO NABO Lightweight Champion and was named the 2010 Outstanding Young Male Boxer of the Year. Bogere is currently signed to Mayweather Promotions. Bogere is known for his flamboyant ring entrances and aggressive fighting style. He is currently trained by legendary trainer Kenny Adams.

== Early life ==
Sharif grew up living the first 18 years of his life in Kampala, the capital city of Uganda.

Bogere began fighting when he was 7 years old, fending off thieves and bullies. Eventually, he made his way into a legitimate gym, where the older veteran boxers took notice of the kid whose shadowboxing looked so fluid and natural. He started spending all of his time at the gym, sometimes practicing for hours without hand wraps or spare change for a drink of water.

== Amateur career ==
Sharif was a five-time African Champion and the captain of the Ugandan national boxing team

Bogere finished his amateur career with an astounding record of 68 wins with just 4 losses (68-4-0).

== Professional career ==
=== Fighting style ===
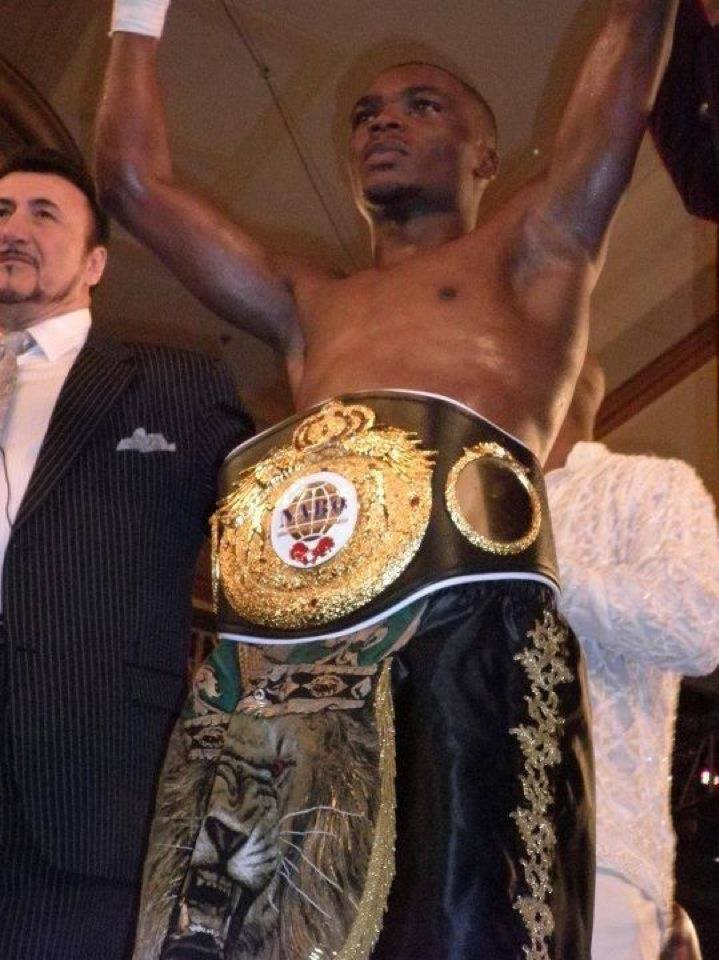
Bogere poses with the WBO NABO Lightweight Championship.

Sharif is an orthodox boxer who has gotten praise from the boxing legend Mike Tyson. "I have watched him four times in Vegas and he seems to possess the potential to go far," Tyson said to BoxingScene. "He’s got speed and agility with some pomp. He is very agile."

=== Trademark ===
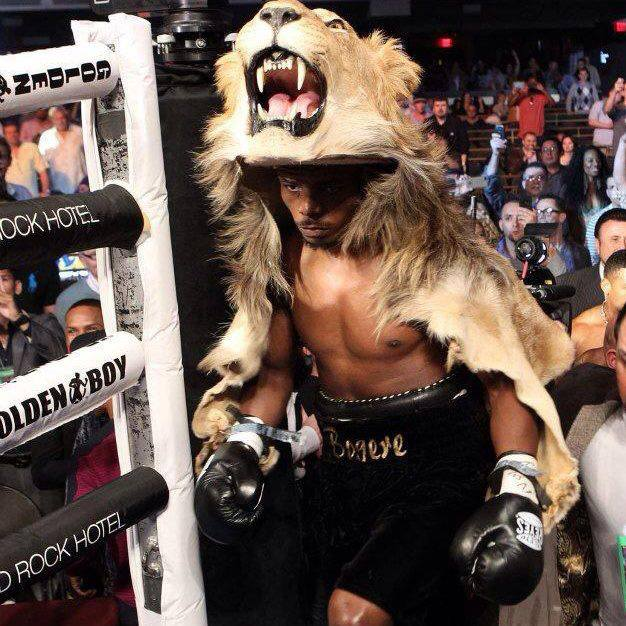
Bogere enters the ring with this trademark lion's head.

Sharif Bogere is nicknamed "The Lion" and the "Lion Warrior". He has used ring entrances in which he was carried in a cage and wore a lion head and skin. Bogere has said that the entrance was intended to make his ring walk distinctive and to recognize his Ugandan supporters.

=== Lightweight ===
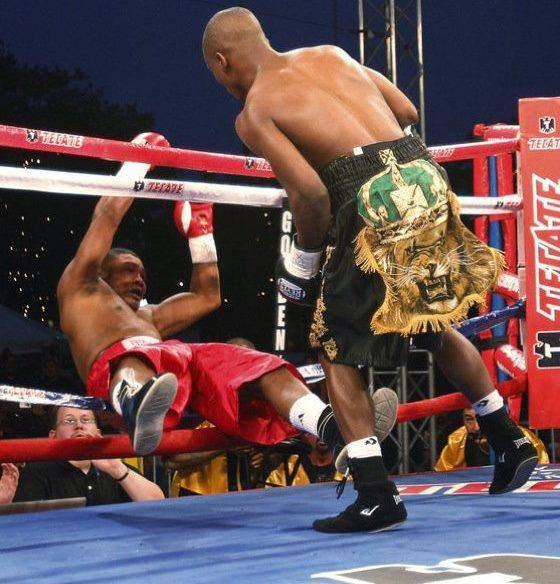
Bogere knocks Ilido Julio through the ring ropes with a punch.

On September 18, 2010 Bogere stopped Mexico's Julian Rodriguez at 1:43 of the second round on the undercard of Shane Mosley vs. Sergio Mora by knockout in round 2, on HBO PPV. He dropped Rodriguez, who was unsteady when he got to his feet and referee called it off.

On May 21, 2010, Bogere continued to make a name for himself when he defeated veteran Ilido Julio handily. Bogere nearly drilled Julio out of the ring in the closing seconds of the first round. Julio refused to come out for the start of the sixth round, remaining on his stool and signaling an end to the onslaught.

==== Bogere vs. Beltran ====
On May 13, 2011 Bogere defeated Raymundo Beltran in a bloody, headbutt-filled 10 Round main event, for the vacant WBO NABO lightweight title. He had a clear speed advantage against Beltran. Beltran constantly stalked Bogere, walking through his punches and looking to engage him in close quarters. This worked for Beltran at times, but Bogere came through the fight to win the WBO NABO lightweight title by unanimous decision.

On October 7, 2011 Bogere defended his WBO NABO lightweight title by fighting Francisco Contreras. Contreras was also undefeated in 16 fights with 13 by way of KO. Bogere was constantly in control and by the 3rd round stopped Contreras with a knockout blow to the back of the head. Although controversial, referee Jay Nady deemed it to be legitimate and Bogere retained the WBO NABO lightweight title.

==== Bogere vs. Abril ====
After two back-to-back victories against Mexico's Sergio Rivera and Manuel Leyva, Bogere would fight Richar Abril for the unified WBA Lightweight Title on March 2, 2013. The fight was originally scheduled for November 24 on the HBO undercard of Robert Guerrero vs. Andre Berto, however Bogere suffered a partial tear of his left Achilles tendon during training and the fight was postponed.

Abril handed Bogere his first professional defeat. After the fight, it was revealed that Bogere had re-injured his Achilles during a middle round, which severely affected his ability to pull out a victory.

==== Return from injury ====
On April 26, 2014, Bogere returned from successful Achilles tendinitis surgery on the Keith Thurman-Julio Diaz undercard. He won his first fight back in action against Arturo Urena, via TKO when Urena's trainer threw in the towel during the sixth round. Just two months later, on June 21, 2014, Bogere would earn another quick victory stopping Miguel Zamudio in the third round on the Robert Guerrero-Yoshihiro Kamegai undercard. Following the victory, Bogere was then again ranked as a top 10 lightweight by The Ring Magazine and ESPN.

On October 30, 2014, Bogere returned to national television with his third straight decisive victory. Live on Fox Sports 1, Bogere knocked out Fernando Garcia in the 5th round with a straight right. Bogere landed an impressive 195 punches out of 498 thrown (39%) in just the five round bout. Garcia landed only 39 out of his 157 thrown (25%). Following this performance, announcers Brian Custer and Paulie Malignaggi agreed that Bogere's speed, sharp offensive combinations and his consistency had put his name into the title shot conversation for a lightweight championship. Bogere sparred with WBO Light Welterweight Champion Chris Algieri out of the Long Life Fighter Gym in Las Vegas in preparation for this fight.

==== Pursuit of World title ====
In an interview with Fight-Hype, Bogere exclaimed, "There are some tough guys in my division, but I'm not afraid of any of them. I'm a warrior and a lion and I can take care of any of these guys on any given night."

In an interview with Kawowo Sports, Bogere explained, "I am adamant that I was the better fighter against Abril and he can't ask for a rematch because he knows I will beat him. I have become a much better fighter and I now have been trained to land punches that will finish off my opponent."

At the 2015 WBC Convention, his promoter Oscar De La Hoya stated, "The Lion is going to eat someone up in 2015 and it's going to be a big year for Sharif. It's going to be Lion time."

In a documentary piece shown by The Africa Channel, Shane Mosley praised Bogere, stating that "I noticed right off when I watched him working that he's very strong - physically strong. Not only that, but mentally strong. When he gets in there he's very determined, regardless of whether he takes a couple shots or not, he's coming right back. He is one of the best fighters out there. He needs a chance at a title, in my opinion."

== Professional record ==
32 Wins (20 knockouts, 12 decisions), 2 Loss, 0 Draws, 1 No Contest
Result	Record	Opponent	Date	Result	Time	Location	Notes
Win	31–1–1	(Mexico) Arturo Santos Reyes	January 27, 2018	UD 10	3:00	(United States) Sam's Town Hotel & Gambling Hall, Las Vegas, USA	
Win	30–1–1	(Mexico) Jose Luis Rodriguez	October 21, 2017	UD 10	3:00	(United States) Sam's Town Hotel & Gambling Hall, Las Vegas, USA	
Win	29–1–1	(Colombia) Luis Eduardo Florez	September 16, 2016	TKO 5	2:05	(United States) Cosmopolitan of Las Vegas, Las Vegas, USA	
Win	28–1–1	(Ghana) Samuel Amoako	April 30, 2016	UD 10	3:00	(United States) Armory, Washington, USA	
NC	27–1	(Mexico) Jose Daniel Ruiz	August 21, 2015	NC	2 (10)	Plaza 28 de Julio, Playa del Carmen, Quintana Roo, Mexico	
Win	27–1	(Mexico) Joksan Hernandez	April 24, 2015	KO 2	—N/a	Foro Polanco, Mexico City, Distrito Federal, Mexico	
Win	26–1	(Mexico) Fernando Garcia	October 30, 2014	KO 5	2:30	Memorial Hall, Plymouth, Massachusetts, United States	
Win	25–1	(Mexico) Miguel Zamudio	June 21, 2014	RTD 3	3:00	StubHub Center, Carson, California, United States	
Win	24–1	(Mexico) Arturo Urena	April 26, 2014	TKO 6	0:50	StubHub Center, Carson, California, United States	First fight back since Achilles injury (420 days).
Loss	23–1	(Cuba) Richar Abril	March 2, 2013	UD 12	3:00	Hard Rock Hotel and Casino, Las Vegas, Nevada, United States	For vacant WBA Lightweight Title.
Win	23–0	(Mexico) Manuel Leyva	June 2, 2012	KO 2	0:38	Home Deport Center, Carson, California, United States	
Win	22–0	(Mexico) Sergio Rivera	February 25, 2012	TKO 3	3:00	Scottrade, Saint Louis, Missouri, United States	Co-main event of Adrien Broner-Eloy Perez.
Win	21–0	(Dominican Republic) Francisco Contreras	October 7, 2011	KO 3	2:01	Texas Station Casino, Las Vegas, Nevada, United States	Retained WBO NABO Lightweight Title.
Win	20–0	(Mexico) Raymundo Beltran	May 13, 2011	UD 10	3:00	Buffalo Bill's Star Arena, Primm, Nevada, United States	Won vacant WBO NABO Lightweight Title.
Win	19–0	(United States) Shamir Reyes	March 4, 2011	KO 1	2:37	Fantasy Springs Casino, Indio, California, United States	
Win	18–0	(Mexico) Christopher Fernandez	December 11, 2010	UD 8	3:00	Mandalay Bay Resort & Casino, Las Vegas, Nevada, United States	Undercard of Amir Khan-Marcos Maidana.
Win	17–0	(Mexico) Julian Rodriguez	Sep 18, 2010	KO 2	1:43	Staples Center, Los Angeles, California, United States	
Win	16–0	(Colombia) Ilido Julio	May 21, 2010	RTD 5	0:10	Chisholm Trail Mural Parking Lot, Fort Worth, Texas, United States	
Win	15–0	(United States) Martin Tucker	April 6, 2010	RTD 1	3:00	Rio Casino, Las Vegas, Nevada, United States	
Win	14–0	(United States) Jose Hernandez	February 26, 2010	TKO 3	0:44	Don Haskins Convention Center, El Paso, Texas, United States	
Win	13–0	(Mexico) Cristian Favela	December 17, 2009	UD 6	3:00	Commerce Casino, Commerce, California, United States	
Win	12–0	(Mexico) Rodolfo Armenta	August 7, 2009	TKO 2	1:07	Buffalo Bill's Star Arena, Primm, Nevada, United States	
Win	11–0	(Puerto Rico) Mike Gonzalez	July 17, 2009	UD 6	3:00	Planet Hollywood Resort and Casino, Las Vegas, Nevada, United States	
Win	10–0	(United States) Broderick Antoine	June 12, 2009	UD 6	3:00	Palms Casino Resort, Las Vegas, Nevada, United States	
Win	9–0	(United States) Kevin Carmody	May 16, 2009	TKO 2	0:40	Buffalo Bill's Star Arena, Primm, Nevada, United States	
Win	8–0	(United States) Marcos Herrera	May 8, 2009	TKO 2	2:43	Plaza Hotel & Casino, Las Vegas, Nevada, United States	
Win	7–0	(United States) Courtney Landis	April 24, 2009	KO 1	2:33	Scottrade Center, Saint Louis, Missouri, United States	
Win	6–0	(United States) Carlos Small	February 14, 2009	UD 4	3:00	Buffalo Bill's Star Arena, Primm, Nevada, United States	
Win	5–0	(United States) Manny Cotrich	January 9, 2009	TKO 2	0:42	Buffalo Bill's Star Arena, Primm, Nevada, United States	
Win	4–0	(United States) Mike Peralta	October 31, 2008	UD 4	3:00	Hard Rock Hotel and Casino, Las Vegas, Nevada, United States	
Win	3–0	(United States) Alejandro Lopez	September 19, 2008	UD 4	3:00	Buffalo Bill's Star Arena, Primm, Nevada, United States	
Win	2–0	(United States) Reymundo Hernandez	April 19, 2008	TKO 1	0:41	Civic Arena, Saint Joseph, Missouri, United States	
Win	1–0	(United States) Ed Lee Humes	April 5, 2008	KO 1	1:09	Prairie Band Casino & Resort, Mayetta, Kansas, United States	Professional debut.

== Titles in boxing ==
Minor world title:

- WBO NABO Lightweight World Champion (135 lbs) - 5/13/2011 to 3/2/2013 (660 days)

== In other media ==
In a 2009 episode of Sports Soup, Versus showed a clip of Bogere clipping opponent Rodolfo Armenta with a flurry of punches, causing him to lose his footing. Host Matt Iseman joked that that was the "first time he'd seen a guy get hit so hard, he contracted polio."

== Entrance themes ==
- "Talk Is Cheap" by Blaq Fuego (March 2, 2013 – present)
- "Stronger" by Nubia (August 7, 2009 - July 2, 2012)
- "Warrior Lion" by Blaq Fuego (April 5, 2008 – July 17, 2009)
