= Justin Savi =

Beninese boxer (born 1984)

Justin Savi (born 30 October 1984) is a Beninese professional boxer who goes by the nickname of "Le Malin" (The Bad Guy). His professional record includes 51 fights: 31 wins (21 knockouts), 18 losses (8 knockouts) and 2 draws. He lives in Cotonou, Benin. On April 16, 2010, he won the first ever WBC silver world title against French boxer Cyril Thomas who quit after 7 rounds.

He also won the IBF Mediterranean featherweight title in 2008 and the ABU featherweight title in 2012.

== Professional boxing record ==
51 fights	31 wins	18 losses
By knockout	21	8
By decision	10	10
Draws	2	

No.	Result	Record	Opponent	Type	Round, time	Date	Location	Notes
51	Loss	31–18–2	(United States) Bill Hutchinson	TKO	5 (8), 2:49	4 Aug 2018	(United States) Meadows Racetrack & Casino, Washington, Pennsylvania, U.S.	
50	Loss	31–17–2	(United States) Daniel Gonzalez	TKO	2 (8), 2:59	8 Jun 2018	(United States) Paramount Theater, Huntington, New York, U.S.	
49	Loss	31–16–2	(Argentina) Fabián Maidana	RTD	3 (6), 3:00	21 Apr 2018	(United States) Barclays Center, Brooklyn, New York, U.S.	
48	Loss	31–15–2	(United States) Jonathan Navarro	UD	8	12 Apr 2018	(United States) Fantasy Springs Resort Casino, Indio, California, U.S.	
47	Loss	31–14–2	(United States) Jeremy Cuevas	TKO	3 (4), 1:25	22 Sep 2017	(United States) SugarHouse Casino, Philadelphia, Pennsylvania, U.S.	
46	Win	31–13–2	(Ghana) Kofi Ansah Raymond	TKO	6 (8)	17 Jun 2017	Seconds Out Boxing Gymnasium, Accra, Ghana	
45	Loss	30–13–2	(Tajikistan) Anvar Yunusov	UD	6	20 May 2017	(United States) Renaissance Palm Springs Hotel, Palm Springs, California, U.S.	
44	Win	30–12–2	(Ghana) Saidu Amadu	TKO	4 (10)	7 May 2017	Napoleon Gymnasium Centre, Accra, Ghana	
43	Loss	29–12–2	(United States) Albert Bell	UD	4	8 Apr 2017	(United States) St. Clement's Hall, Toledo, Ohio, U.S.	
42	Loss	29–11–2	(United States) Justin Pauldo	UD	4	14 Mar 2017	(United States) Fitzgerald's Casino & Hotel, Tunica, Mississippi, U.S.	
41	Loss	29–10–2	(United States) Raynell Williams	TKO	2 (8), 3:00	10 Feb 2017	(United States) Huntington Center, Toledo, Ohio, U.S.	
40	Loss	29–9–2	(United States) Stan Martyniouk	UD	8	7 Jan 2017	(United States) Hyatt Regency Hotel, Minneapolis, Minnesota, U.S.	
39	Win	29–8–2	(Ghana) Joseph Adu	TKO	6 (8)	27 Nov 2016	Seconds Out Boxing Gymnasium, Accra, Ghana	
38	Loss	28–8–2	(United States) Chris Singleton	UD	6	16 Sep 2016	(United States) Belle of Baton Rogue Casino, Baton Rouge, Louisiana, U.S.	
37	Loss	28–7–2	(United States) Rod Salka	UD	8	27 Aug 2016	(United States) Meadows Racetrack & Casino, Washington, Pennsylvania, U.S.	
36	Loss	28–6–2	(United States) Rico Ramos	UD	8	11 Jun 2016	(United States) Los Angeles Badminton Club, El Monte, California, U.S.	
35	Loss	28–5–2	(Mexico) Jhonny González	TKO	2 (10), 1:45	2 Apr 2016	Centro de Convenciones, Tlalnepantla de Baz, Mexico	For WBC International Silver super featherweight title
34	Draw	28–4–2	(Benin) Fatiou Fassinou	PTS	6	12 Feb 2016	Hall des Arts, Cotonou, Benin	
33	Loss	28–4–1	(Ghana) Rafael Mensah	UD	10	26 Dec 2015	Baba Yara Sports Stadium, Kumasi, Ghana	
32	Win	28–3–1	(Ghana) Galley Cudjoe	RTD	4 (?), 3:00	13 Jun 2015	Aborigines Beach Resort, Keta, Ghana	
31	Win	27–3–1	(Ghana) Edward Kambasa	PTS	8	9 May 2015	Centre Sportif Soweto de Dedokpo, Cotonou, Benin	
30	Draw	26–3–1	(Ghana) Benjamin Lamptey	PTS	8	3 Jan 2015	Unity Park, Accra, Ghana	
29	Loss	26–3	(South Africa) Malcolm Klassen	TKO	4 (10)	29 Sep 2014	Emperors Palace, Kempton Park, South Africa	
28	Win	26–2	(Togo) Mouibi Sarouna	UD	12	24 Nov 2012	Palaia du 29 juillet, Niamey, Niger	Won vacant African featherweight title
27	Loss	25–2	(Cuba) Angelo Santana	TKO	3 (10), 1:51	23 Jun 2012	(United States) Seminole Hard Rock Hotel & Casino, Hollywood, California, U.S.	
26	Win	25–1	(Algeria) Yacine Aberkane	KO	2 (10)	20 Jan 2012	Palais du 29 juillet, Niamey, Niger	Trophée de la Francophonie de Boxe
25	Win	24–1	(Ghana) Saidu Amadu	TKO	1 (8)	15 Apr 2011	Hall des Arts, Cotonou, Benin	
24	Loss	23–1	(Mexico) Alberto Garza	UD	12	20 Nov 2010	Arena Monterrey, Monterrey, Mexico	Lost WBC Silver featherweight title
23	Win	23–0	(France) Cyril Thomas	RTD	7 (12), 3:00	16 Apr 2010	Palais des Sports, Saint-Quentin, France	Won inaugural WBC Silver featherweight title
22	Win	22–0	(Nigeria) Alfred Tete Junior	KO	5 (8)	12 Dec 2009	Maison de Peuple, Ouagadougou, Burkina Faso	
21	Win	21–0	(Nigeria) Dare Oyewole	TKO	3 (8)	26 Jul 2009	Maison de Peuple, Ouagadougou, Burkina Faso	
20	Win	20–0	(Nigeria) Kazeem Ariyo	TKO	4 (8)	11 Apr 2009	Palais congrès de Lomé, Lomé, Togo	
19	Win	19–0	(Nigeria) Ola Adebakin	TKO	6 (8)	14 Feb 2009	la Place de la Nation, Ouagadougou, Burkina Faso	
18	Win	18–0	(Nigeria) Akim Shegun	TKO	6 (8)	31 Oct 2008	Ouagadougou, Burkina Faso	
17	Win	17–0	(Ukraine) Mykyta Lukin	UD	8	30 Aug 2008	Max-Schmeling-Halle, Prenzlauer Berg, Germany	
16	Win	16–0	(Argentina) Pastor Humberto Maurin	UD	12	7 Jun 2008	Hall des Arts, Cotonou, Benin	Won inaugural IBF Mediterranean featherweight title
15	Win	15–0	(Nigeria) King Sharafa	TKO	3 (8)	3 May 2008	Maison du Peuple, Ouagadougou, Burkina Faso	
14	Win	14–0	(Nigeria) Odimbu Edi	TKO	5 (8)	15 Mar 2008	Lomé, Togo	
13	Win	13–0	(France) Abdallah Ben Saïd	PTS	6	17 Mar 2007	Palais des sports Marcel-Cerdan, Levallois-Perret, France	
12	Win	12–0	(Puerto Rico) Michael Mendez	KO	2 (4), 0:48	4 Nov 2006	(United States) Chase Field, Phoenix, Arizona, U.S.	
11	Win	11–0	(United States) Terrance Roy	TKO	3 (6), 2:33	7 Oct 2006	(United States) Allstate Arena, Rosemont, Illinois, U.S.	
10	Win	10–0	(France) Jeannick Gonthier	PTS	?	3 Jun 2006	Lomé, Togo	
9	Win	9–0	(Algeria) Samir Ferhat	TKO	3 (8)	8 Apr 2006	Parc des Sports, Pont-Audemer, France	
8	Win	8–0	(Ghana) Osumana Akaba	UD	8	18 Dec 2004	Ohene Djan Sports Stadium, Accra, Ghana	
7	Win	7–0	(Nigeria) Azeez Onikoyi	PTS	8	17 Oct 2004	Ilrin stadium, Ilorin, Nigeria	
6	Win	6–0	(Togo) Gakpa Kokouvi	PTS	8	4 Apr 2004	Hall des Arts, Cotonou, Benin	
5	Win	5–0	(Burkina Faso) Dramane Nabaloum	PTS	8	3 Oct 2003	Maison du Peuple, Ouagadougou, Burkina Faso	
4	Win	4–0	(Ivory Coast) Frank Amissi	KO	7 (8)	29 Nov 2002	Hall des Arts, Cotonou, Benin	
3	Win	3–0	(Benin) Mohammed Kabiru	TKO	2 (6)	6 Jul 2002	Hall des Arts, Cotonou, Benin	
2	Win	2–0	(Benin) Louis Tossavi	KO	4 (6)	2 Mar 2002	Hall des Arts, Cotonou, Benin	
1	Win	1–0	(Benin) Sebastian Gouvide	KO	2 (6)	1 Dec 2001	Hall des Arts, Cotonou, Benin	
