= Ernesto Mercado =

American boxer (born 2001)

Personal information
- Nickname: Tito
- Nationality: American
- Born: October 29, 2001 (age 24) Upland, California, U.S.
- Height: 5 ft 10 in (178 cm)
- Weight: Super Lightweight

Boxing career
- Stance: Orthodox

Boxing record
- Total fights: 19
- Wins: 19
- Win by KO: 18

Ernesto Mercado (born October 29, 2001) is an American professional boxer who competes in the super lightweight division.

== Amateur career ==
Mercado had a successful amateur career with a record of 278-11 fights and going unbeaten in the olympic trials but missed the games due to covid. He was also a 21 time national champions.

== Professional career ==
=== Mercado vs Ndongeni ===
Mercado went the distance for the first time in his 11th fight against the South African Xolisani Ndongeni. Despite failing to get the stoppage, Mercado dominated the fight with his jab and overhand right hands. All three judges scored the fight 99-91 in favour of Mercado.

=== Mercado vs Nakathila ===
Mercado faced former interim world title challenger Jeremia Nakathila in his 13th fight and became the first man to stop the durable Namibian. After dropping Nakathila in round 2 the referee stopped the fight after an immediate onslaught from Mercado.

=== Mercado vs Pedraza ===
Mercado achieved the biggest win of his career so far over former world champion Jose Pedraza. After dominating the first three rounds, Mercado dropped Pedraza in the fourth round. Despite beating the count the referee felt stopped the fight feeling Pedraza was not able to continue.

== Professional boxing record ==
19 fights	19 wins	0 losses
By knockout	18	0
By decision	1	0

No.	Result	Record	Opponent	Type	Round, time	Date	Location	Notes
19	Win	19–0	Juan Carlos Burgos	KO	2 (10), 2:40	Jun 19, 2026	Thunder Studios, Long Beach, California, U.S.	Retained WBO International super lightweight title
18	Win	18–0	Antonio Moran	KO	6 (10), 2:37	Dec 13, 2025	Stockton Arena, Stockton, California, U.S	Won WBO International super lightweight title
17	Win	17–0	Jose Pedraza	TKO	4 (10), 2:07	Jan 25, 2025	Chelsea Ballroom, Las Vegas, Nevada, U.S.	
16	Win	16–0	Hector Edgardo Sarmiento	RTD	3 (10), 3:00	Jul 27, 2024	Little Caesars Arena, Detroit, Michigan, U.S.	
15	Win	15–0	Denier Berrio	RTD	3 (10), 3:00	Apr 5, 2024	Red Owl Boxing Arena, Houston, Texas, U.S.	
14	Win	14–0	Cristian Bielma	KO	2 (10), 0:42	Feb 24, 2024	Evolution Club, Tijuana, Mexico	
13	Win	13–0	Jeremia Nakathila	KO	2 (10),	Nov 11, 2023	Phoenix Center, Ontario, California, U.S.	
12	Win	12–0	Carlos Manuel Portillo	KO	1 (10), 1:36	Aug 26, 2023	Phoenix Center, Ontario, California, U.S.	
11	Win	11–0	Xolisani Ndongeni	UD	10	Jul 8, 2023	Puerto Salvador Allende, Managua, Nicaragua	
10	Win	10–0	Henry Lundy	KO	1 (10), 2:29	Apr 15, 2023	Phoenix Center, Ontario, California, U.S.	
9	Win	9–0	Jose Angulo	KO	7 (8), 1:05	Feb 4, 2023	Phoenix Center, Ontario, California, U.S.	
8	Win	8–0	Jayson Velez	KO	6 (8), 3:00	Oct 22, 2022	Phoenix Center, Ontario, California, U.S.	
7	Win	7–0	Alfredo Rodolfo Blanco	KO	2 (8), 0:45	Aug 25, 2022	The Hangar, Costa Mesa, California, U.S.	
6	Win	6–0	Jose Zaragoza	KO	2 (6), 1:07	May 12, 2022	Quiet Cannon Country Club, Montibello, California, U.S.	
5	Win	5–0	Daniel Evangelista Jr	KO	1 (6), 1:37	Apr 14, 2022	The Hangar, Costa Mesa, California, U.S.	
4	Win	4–0	Marc Misiura	KO	1 (6), 2:58	Apr 3, 2021	Commerce Casino, Commerce, California, U.S.	
3	Win	3–0	Nathan Benichou	KO	1 (6), 2:42	Oct 14, 2021	The Hangar, Costa Mesa, California, U.S.	
2	Win	2–0	Osmel Mayorga	RTD	1 (6), 3:00	Sep 25, 2021	Sports Arena, Pico Rivera, California, U.S.	
1	Win	1–0	Christopher Johnson	KO	2 (4), 2:26	Jul 31, 2021	Osceola Heritage Park, Decatur, Georgia, U.S.	
