= Hank Lundy =

American boxer (born 1984)

Personal information
- Nickname: Hammerin'
- Born: Henry Lundy; January 3, 1984 (age 42) Philadelphia, Pennsylvania, U.S.
- Height: 5 ft 7 in (170 cm)
- Weight: Lightweight; Light welterweight

Boxing career
- Reach: 68 in (173 cm)
- Stance: Orthodox

Boxing record
- Total fights: 43
- Wins: 31
- Win by KO: 14
- Losses: 11
- Draws: 1

Henry "Hank" Lundy (born January 3, 1984) is a professional American boxer. He challenged once for the WBO junior welterweight title in 2016, having previously held the regional WBO–NABO lightweight title in 2010, and the NABF lightweight title from 2011 to 2012. On December 30, 2016, Lundy defeated John Delperdang for the vacant UBF lightweight world title.

== Early life ==
Lundy's first love growing up was football; he earned a partial scholarship to play collegiate football at Kutztown University of Pennsylvania, but declined upon learning his aunt could not afford to send both him and his sister, Muneerah, to college. "Send my little sister", Lundy told his aunt, "and I'll find another way."

Lundy eventually took a liking to boxing at the age of 18 after knocking out a would-be schoolyard bully with an uppercut. "I put him to sleep", Lundy recalled. Fearing the repercussions, Lundy ran home to his uncle, who told him to put his quick hands to use. "People ain't fighting people – they're shooting people!" he told Lundy, "So get your butt in the gym!"

== Amateur career ==
Lundy took his family's advice and began a successful amateur boxing career in which he finished 65–5 overall and won the 2003 Pennsylvania Golden Gloves. Lundy also won a silver medal at the 2005 National Golden Gloves and won the Junior Lightweight Open Division championship at the Middle Atlantic Championships and East Central Championships before his amateur career ended with a narrow loss in the 2007 Pan-Am Games.

== Professional career ==
Lundy began his professional career in 2006 under the guidance of promoter Jimmy Burchfield Sr. and Classic Entertainment and Sports, defeating Steve Thomas by first-round knockout at the Cape Cod Melody Tent in Hyannis, Massachusetts.

Lundy quickly rose to 10–0 within the next 16 months, including wins in Providence, Rhode Island; Lincoln, Rhode Island; and Mashantucket, Connecticut, at Foxwoods Resort Casino, establishing an early reputation as one of boxing's most promising road warriors.

On March 28, 2008, Lundy faced his toughest test to date when he traveled to Salamanca, New York, to face undefeated hometown favorite Darnell Jiles Jr. at the Seneca Allegany Casino on ESPN's Friday Night Fights. The bout ended in a draw with all three judges scoring the fight, 38–38.

Lundy returned to ESPN two months later, facing another unbeaten prospect in Esteban Almarez. This time, Lundy earned the win, narrowly beating Almarez by unanimous decision, 38–37, 38–37, 38–36 at the Twin River Casino in Lincoln, Rhode Island.

A year later, Lundy earned a breakthrough victory, knocking out undefeated Jason Cintron, the younger brother of former world champion Kermit Cintron, in the fifth round of their scheduled eight-round bout at the Prudential Center in Newark, New Jersey, on April 24, 2009.

Lundy called out Cintron prior to the bout, questioning Cintron's background and predicting a knockout win. "I guarantee this fight will be over in three rounds", Lundy said. "I hold no punches in the ring. When you look at my resume, I'm fighting people that can fight. Who has he fought? There's a buzz going around that he's planning to knock me out. You have, what, three knockouts on paper? Look at my knockout ratio. Look at the type of guys I’m fighting. He's not on my level. He's nowhere in the same league as me."

Lundy breezed through his next three bouts, stopping former New England amateur standout Josh Beeman in the fifth round, knocking out Justo Sanchez in the sixth round of a scheduled 10-round bout two months later, and annihilating Aldo Valtierra in 2 minutes, 41 seconds at Mohegan Sun on October 31, 2009.

Lundy began 2010 with another tough challenge, facing former Cuban amateur standout Richard Abril at The Roxy in Boston, Massachusetts, on January 22. Despite getting knocked down in the sixth round on what appeared to be a slip, Lundy held on for a narrow, 98–91, 96–94, 94–95 split-decision victory to improve to 17–0–1.

With eight consecutive wins under his belt, Lundy issued a challenge to lightweights willing to face him in the ring. "Look at the records of the guys who I have fought", Lundy said. "I was fighting opponents with fifty-plus fights in my sixth bout. I have fought many veterans, undefeated guys and now contenders. I am ready for the next level, any lightweight out there, preferably in the top 10, because I know I am very close to realizing my dream to become world champion."

=== NABO championship ===
Undefeated lightweight Tyrese Hendrix answered Lundy's challenge, agreeing to face Lundy on April 16, 2010, at the Omni New Daisy Theater in Memphis, Tennessee, for the vacant NABO lightweight title on Friday Night Fights.

Lundy dominated, knocking down Hendrix twice in the first and again in the sixth en route to a 98–90, 100–88, 99–88 unanimous-decision victory to capture the NABO title.

=== First career loss ===
Three months after winning the title, Lundy made his first defense against John Molina Jr. in the main event of ESPN's Friday Night Fights at Twin River Casino in Lincoln, Rhode Island, on July 9, 2010.

Lundy's speed and power overwhelmed Molina through the first half of the fight before Molina sent Lundy to the canvas in the eighth round courtesy of a hard, overhand right. Lundy made it back to his feet, but struggled down the stretch; Molina caught Lundy against the ropes in the 11th round and finished him off with a flurry, prompting referee Ricky Gonzalez to stop the bout at the 2:18 mark.

Molina improved to 21–1 while Lundy dropped to 18–1–1.

Lundy returned to the ring five weeks later, again on ESPN, with a unanimous decision win over Omri Lowther in Montreal, Quebec – a fight Lundy agreed to take on three days' notice.

=== NABF championship ===
Lundy earned another shot at a title on April 1, 2011, when he faced former Venezuelan Olympian Patrick Lopez for the vacant NABF lightweight championship on Friday Night Fights at Foxwoods Resort Casino.

Lundy sent Lopez to the canvas in the second round and ultimately won the fight by unanimous decision, 99–91, 97–92, 95–94.

The win was Lundy's second in a row since losing to Molina, improving his overall record to 20–1–1.

=== Showdown against David Diaz ===
Four months after beating Lopez, Lundy again traveled to an opponent's backyard, agreeing to face former world champion and fan favorite David Diaz at the Horseshoe Casino in Hammond, Indiana, a short distance from Diaz's hometown of Chicago, Illinois.

The fight took place August 19, 2011 on ESPN. Lundy took control early before Diaz caught him with a right hook in the fourth round, sending Lundy tumbling to the canvas. Diaz tried desperately to end the fight in the fourth, but Lundy survived and eventually cut Diaz above the eye in the fifth. Referee Gerald Scott threatened to stop the fight due to the damage over Diaz's eye, but ultimately allowed the former world champion to continue. Lundy finished Diaz in the sixth with a left hand that put Diaz on his back 37 seconds into the round.

=== Second NABF title defense ===
After making his first title defense against Diaz, Lundy squared off against little-known power-puncher Dannie Williams of St. Louis, Missouri. Williams began the war of words in December by threatening to "hurt" Lundy if the two were to meet in the ring.

The match was scheduled as the 10-round main event of ESPN's Friday Night Fights on March 30, 2012, at the Foxwoods Resort Casino's MGM Grand Theater. After months of talk from both camps, Williams got off to a strong start, dropping Lundy with a hard right hand to the temple in the opening round. Lundy bounced back to dominant the final nine rounds in arguably his most impressive victory to date. Lundy won unanimously on all three scorecards, 97–92, 97–92, 98–91, utilizing his jab to neutralize Williams' counter-punching abilities.

=== Third NABF title defense ===
On July 27, 2012, Lundy defended his title against Mexican challenger Ray Beltran in the main event of ESPN's Friday Night Fights at Resorts Casino Hotel in Atlantic City, New Jersey. Lundy entered the fight ranked No. 1 among lightweights in the WBC. Beltran applied pressure throughout the fight, constantly driving Lundy against the ropes. Both fighters exchanged clean blows at the end of the third round, with Lundy striking Beltran at the bell, wobbling Beltran momentarily, but Beltran escaped with a 96–94, 96–94, 95–95 majority-decision, claiming the NABF crown and handing Lundy just the second loss of his professional career.

=== Move to 140-pound division ===
Following the loss to Beltran, Lundy moved up from lightweight to light welterweight and challenged then undefeated and No. 3 ranked World Boxing Council light welterweight contender Viktor Postol on March 21, 2013, in Kyiv, Ukraine. Lundy gave Postol his toughest test to date, particularly in the late rounds of their scheduled 12-round bout, but lost a 116–112, 116–112, 116-113 unanimous decision.

Shortly thereafter, Lundy returned to ESPN's Friday Night Fights in Salem, New Hampshire, to face 33-year-old Nigerian veteran Ajose Olusegun in the 10-round main event at Rockingham Park on July 19, 2013. Despite taking the fight on short notice, Lundy pieced together arguably his most impressive performance to date, dominating Olusegun to earn a 100–90, 98–92, 98-92 unanimous decision win. The win snapped Lundy's two-fight losing streak.

=== Return to prominence ===
With the win over Olusegun generating significant buzz in the boxing world, Lundy faced another tall task early in 2014 when he battled rising prospect and Cuban defector Angelo Santana in the main event of the Friday, Feb. 21, 2014 edition of ShoBox: The Next Generation, Lundy's first appearance on Showtime.

It was a breakthrough performance for Lundy, who outboxed Santana over 10 rounds at the Wolstein Center in Cleveland, Ohio, to win unanimously on all three scorecards, 98–91. Lundy sealed the lopsided victory with a knockdown in the ninth round.

Lundy returned to the ring on May 31, 2014, at Mohegan Sun in Uncasville, Connecticut, where he beat Mexican challenger Gerardo Cuevas, the son of former world champion Pipino Cuevas, via second-round knockout, his third consecutive win.

=== HBO debut ===
Lundy put his winning streak on the line in his HBO debut against NABF super lightweight champion Thomas Dulorme on December 6, 2014, at the Barclays Center in Brooklyn, New York. The two also fought for the vacant NABO title.

Dulorme sent Lundy to the canvas in the opening round of their scheduled 10-round bout, but Lundy made his push in the later rounds, at one point hurting Dulorme in the sixth with a hard left hook. Dulorme held on and won by split decision, 97–92, 96–93, 93–96.

A month later, Lundy agreed to fight Boxcino lightweight tournament champion Petr Petrov on just eight days' notice in the main event of an ESPN telecast at the Turning Stone Resort & Casino in Verona, New York. Lundy missed weight by four pounds and the bout was cancelled.

Lundy fought again on national television on July 11, 2015, this time challenging Mauricio Herrera in the main event on HBO Latino for the vacant NABF 140-pound title. Lundy lost on the scorecards via technical decision when the fight was stopped toward the end of the fifth round due to a pair of cuts over each of Herrera's eyes caused by accidental head-butts. Each judge scored the bout even after four, but judges Eddie Hernandez and Fernando Villareal awarded the partial fifth round to Herrera while Zac Young ruled it an even 10-10 round. Herrera won, 48–47, 48–47, 48-48.

=== Return to lightweight division ===
After the bout with Petrov was cancelled, Lundy vowed to return to 135 pounds to silence the critics who suggested he could no longer make that weight in his 30s. On October 17, 2015, Lundy made his long-awaited return to the lightweight division at Mohegan Sun in Connecticut, defeating Carlos Winston Velasquez by fifth-round knockout to capture the vacant WBC Continental Americas Titles. Lundy dominated the fight from the opening bell, dropping Velasquez twice before the referee stopped the bout in the fifth.

=== First world title shot ===
After winning in October, Lundy earned his first shot at a world title when he faced reigning World Boxing Organization (WBO) junior welterweight champion Terence Crawford in the main event of HBO's World Championship Boxing Telecast Feb. 27th, 2016 at The Theater at Madison Square Garden. Panned as a second-rate fight for the undefeated Crawford, the bout picked up considerable steam in the weeks leading up to the telecast as Lundy boldly predicted a knockout win. Following a heated press conference in New York City in which Crawford pushed Lundy during their face-off, Crawford stopped Lundy at the 2:09 mark of the fifth round.

== Professional boxing record ==
43 fights	31 wins	11 losses
By knockout	14	3
By decision	17	8
Draws	1	

No.	Result	Record	Opponent	Type	Round, time	Date	Location	Notes
43	Loss	31–11–1	Alex Martin	UD	10	Aug 6, 2022	Dickies Arena, Fort Worth, Texas	
42	Loss	31–10–1	Robbie Davies Jr.	KO	2 (10), 1:23	Dec 11, 2021	Echo Arena, Liverpool, England	For WBA Continental light welterweight title
41	Loss	31–9–1	Jose Zepeda	UD	10	May 22, 2021	Virgin Hotels Las Vegas, Paradise, Nevada, U.S.	For WBC Silver light welterweight title
40	Win	31–8–1	Ezequiel Victor Fernandez	UD	8	Feb 29, 2020	PAL Center, Hockessin, Delaware, U.S.	
39	Win	30–8–1	Robert Franckel	UD	8	Oct 5, 2019	PAL Center, Hockessin, Delaware, U.S.	
38	Loss	29–8–1	Avery Sparrow	MD	10	Mar 15, 2019	Liacouras Center, Philadelphia, Pennsylvania, U.S.	
37	Loss	29–7–1	Zaur Abdullaev	UD	12	Sep 7, 2018	Traktor Sport Palace, Chelyabinsk, Russia	For WBC Silver lightweight title
36	Win	29–6–1	DeMarcus Corley	UD	8	Feb 10, 2018	2300 Arena, Philadelphia, Pennsylvania, U.S.	
35	Win	28–6–1	Daniel Evangelista Jr.	TKO	5 (8), 2:53	Jun 2, 2017	2300 Arena, Philadelphia, Pennsylvania, U.S.	
34	Win	27–6–1	John Delperdang	UD	12	Dec 30, 2016	B.O.O.M. Fitness Center, Cincinnati, Ohio, U.S.	Won vacant UBF lightweight title
33	Loss	26–6–1	Terence Crawford	TKO	5 (12), 2:09	Feb 27, 2016	The Theater at Madison Square Garden, New York City, New York, U.S.	For WBO light welterweight title
32	Win	26–5–1	Carlos Winston Velasquez	TKO	5 (8), 0:23	Oct 17, 2015	Mohegan Sun Arena, Montville, Connecticut, U.S.	Won vacant WBC Continental Americas lightweight title
31	Loss	25–5–1	Mauricio Herrera	TD	5 (12), 2:09	Jul 11, 2015	Memorial Sports Arena, Los Angeles, California, U.S.	For vacant NABF light welterweight title; Majority TD after Herrera was cut from accidental head clashes
30	Loss	25–4–1	Thomas Dulorme	SD	10	Dec 6, 2014	Barclays Center, New York City, New York, U.S.	For NABF and vacant WBO–NABO light welterweight titles
29	Win	25–3–1	Gerardo Cuevas	KO	2 (10)	May 31, 2014	Mohegan Sun Arena, Montville, Connecticut, U.S.	
28	Win	24–3–1	Angelo Santana	UD	10	Feb 21, 2014	Wolstein Center, Cleveland, Ohio, U.S.	
27	Win	23–3–1	Ajose Olusegun	UD	10	Jul 19, 2013	Rockingham Park, Salem, New Hampshire, U.S.	
26	Loss	22–3–1	Viktor Postol	UD	12	Mar 21, 2013	Club Sport Life, Kyiv, Ukraine	For vacant WBC International light welterweight title
25	Loss	22–2–1	Ray Beltrán	MD	10	Jul 27, 2012	Resorts Casino Hotel, Atlantic City, New Jersey, U.S.	Lost NABF lightweight title
24	Win	22–1–1	Dannie Williams	UD	10	Mar 30, 2012	Foxwoods Resort Casino, Ledyard, Connecticut, U.S.	Retained NABF lightweight title
23	Win	21–1–1	David Díaz	KO	6 (10), 0:37	Aug 19, 2011	Horseshoe, Hammond, Indiana, U.S.	Retained NABF lightweight title
22	Win	20–1–1	Patrick López	UD	10	Apr 1, 2011	Foxwoods Resort Casino, Ledyard, Connecticut, U.S.	Won vacant NABF lightweight title
21	Win	19–1–1	Omri Lowther	UD	10	Aug 28, 2010	Métropolis, Montreal, Quebec, Canada	
20	Loss	18–1–1	John Molina Jr.	TKO	11 (12), 2:18	Jul 9, 2010	Twin River Event Center, Lincoln, Rhode Island, U.S.	Lost WBO–NABO lightweight title
19	Win	18–0–1	Tyrese Hendrix	UD	10	Apr 16, 2010	The New Daisy Theatre, Memphis, Tennessee, U.S.	Won vacant WBO–NABO lightweight title
18	Win	17–0–1	Richar Abril	SD	10	Jan 22, 2010	The Roxy, Boston, Massachusetts, U.S.	
17	Win	16–0–1	Aldo Valtierra	TKO	1 (10), 2:41	Oct 31, 2009	Mohegan Sun Arena, Montville, Connecticut, U.S.	
16	Win	15–0–1	Justo Sanchez	TKO	6 (10), 0:21	Sep 26, 2009	Yesha Ministries Worship Center, Philadelphia, Pennsylvania, U.S.	
15	Win	14–0–1	Josh Beeman	TKO	5 (6), 1:34	Jul 17, 2009	Twin River Event Center, Lincoln, Rhode Island, U.S.	
14	Win	13–0–1	Jason Cintron	KO	5 (8)	Apr 24, 2009	Prudential Center, Newark, New Jersey, U.S.	
13	Win	12–0–1	Ben Odamattey	UD	6	Nov 22, 2008	4 Bears Casino & Lodge, New Town, North Dakota, U.S.	
12	Win	11–0–1	Esteban Almaraz	UD	4	May 23, 2008	Twin River Event Center, Lincoln, Rhode Island, U.S.	
11	Draw	10–0–1	Darnell Jiles Jr.	UD	4	Mar 28, 2008	Seneca Allegany Casino, Salamanca, New York, U.S.	
10	Win	10–0	Damon Antoine	UD	6	Jan 25, 2008	The Blue Horizon, Philadelphia, Pennsylvania, U.S.	
9	Win	9–0	Starr Johnson	TKO	1 (4), 2:44	Oct 12, 2007	The Blue Horizon, Philadelphia, Pennsylvania, U.S.	
8	Win	8–0	Andre Baker	UD	4	Aug 3, 2007	National Guard Armory, Philadelphia, Pennsylvania, U.S.	
7	Win	7–0	Devarise Crayton	TKO	2 (4), 1:48	Jun 20, 2007	Foxwoods Resort Casino, Ledyard, Connecticut, U.S.	
6	Win	6–0	Reggie Sanders	UD	4	Jun 1, 2007	The Blue Horizon, Philadelphia, Pennsylvania, U.S.	
5	Win	5–0	Jose Velazquez	TKO	2 (4), 2:49	May 11, 2007	Twin River Event Center, Lincoln, Rhode Island, U.S.	
4	Win	4–0	Jesse Francisco	TKO	2 (4), 1:55	Jan 26, 2007	National Guard Armory, Philadelphia, Pennsylvania, U.S.	
3	Win	3–0	Michael Williams	TKO	1 (4), 2:20	Oct 14, 2006	Dunkin' Donuts Center, Providence, Rhode Island, U.S.	
2	Win	2–0	Olade Thomas	UD	4	Aug 9, 2006	Foxwoods Resort Casino, Ledyard, Connecticut, U.S.	
1	Win	1–0	Steve Thomas	TKO	1 (4), 2:28	Jul 7, 2006	Cape Cod Melody Tent, Hyannis, Massachusetts, U.S.	

Sporting positions
Regional boxing titles
Vacant Title last held by Martin Honorio	WBO–NABO lightweight champion April 16, 2010 – July 9, 2010	Succeeded by John Molina Jr.
Vacant Title last held by Brandon Ríos	NABF lightweight champion April 1, 2011 – July 27, 2012	Succeeded by Ray Beltrán
Vacant Title last held by Tony Luis	WBC Continental Americas lightweight champion October 17, 2015 – February 2016; Vacated	Vacant Title next held by Jairo Lopez
Minor world boxing titles
Vacant Title last held by Steve Quinonez	UBF lightweight champion December 30, 2016 – present	Incumbent
