= Omri Lowther =

American boxer

Personal information
- Nickname: Ominous
- Nationality: American
- Born: December 27, 1983 (age 42) Valdosta, Georgia
- Height: 5 ft 10 in (178 cm)
- Weight: Lightweight; Light welterweight

Boxing career
- Reach: 72 in (183 cm)
- Stance: Orthodox

Boxing record
- Total fights: 19
- Wins: 15
- Win by KO: 11
- Losses: 4
- Draws: 0
- No contests: 0

Omri Lowther (born December 27, 1983) is an American former professional boxer who competed from 2006 to 2012, holding the WBA Fedecaribe lightweight title in 2009.

== Professional career ==
Omri won his first title the WBA Fedecaribe lightweight title by beating Juan Carlos Batista of the Dominican Republic.

In August 2006, on ESPN's Friday Night Fights he would go on to lose a ten-round decision to title contender Henry Lundy.

On November 13, 2010 Lowther fought Brandon Rios in Cowboys Stadium, Arlington, Texas. The fight ended in a loss for Lowther after a TKO in the fifth round.
