= Luis Ramos Jr. =

American boxer

Personal information
- Nickname: El Zurdo
- Nationality: (United States) American
- Born: Luis Ramos Jr. Santa Ana, California
- Height: 5 ft 8 in (173 cm)
- Weight: Welterweight; Light Welterweight; Lightweight

Boxing career
- Reach: 66½″ in (169 cm)
- Stance: Southpaw

Boxing record
- Total fights: 28
- Wins: 26
- Win by KO: 10
- Losses: 2
- Draws: 0
- No contests: 0

Luis Ramos Jr. is a Mexican American former professional boxer.

== Amateur career ==
Ramos began boxing at the age of 10 in Santa Ana, California. His first trainer was Manuel Garcia. After a few years, he moved on to train with Hector Lopez. He went on to compete as a top amateur, winning several national championships. As an amateur, he ended his career with a 120–16 record. After falling short of a spot on the 2008 Olympic team, Ramos turned pro.

== Professional career ==
Ramos made his pro debut as a lightweight on October 19, 2007, knocking out Christian Jose Reyes in one round. Over the next year, Luis continued his strong start, knocking out two of his four opponents in the first round. On July 30, 2007, Luis faced fellow rising prospect Aaron Dominguez, stopping him in the fifth round.

In July 2009 Ramos was signed to Oscar De La Hoya's Golden Boy Promotions.

Ramos won his next eight fights in the lightweight division before moving up to light welterweight.

On May 1, 2010, Ramos faced Allen Litzau on the undercard of the Floyd Mayweather Jr. vs. Shane Mosley bout at the MGM Grand Las Vegas. The first of his fights at light welterweight, he defeated Litzau via second-round TKO.

On January 6, 2012, Ramos fought Raymundo Beltran in the headline event of Showtime's ShoBox. A veteran boxer and sparring partner of Manny Pacquiao, Beltran was Ramo's toughest opponent to date. In a hard-fought contest, Ramos won by unanimous decision, winning the vacant NABA USA lightweight title.

Ramos was stopped in his last two fights, one against Ricardo Williams Jr. on December 8, 2012, and recently Fidel Maldonado on November 11, 2013, on Fox Sports 1. In both fights, Ramos suffered cuts. Against Williams, the referee and doctor put a stop to the action in the 5th round due to the cut. In his fight against Maldonado, Ramos Jr. was cut in the first round and ultimately being KO'd in the 7th round at the 17 second mark. Ramos is now in a scary portion of his career where his dream to chase a world championship is starting to drift away following these two fights against inferior opponents.

=== Professional boxing record ===
26 Wins (10 knockouts), 2 Losses 0 Draws
Res.	Record	Opponent	Type	Rd., Time	Date	Location	Notes
Win	26–2	(Mexico) Cristobal Cruz	UD	8 (8)	April 2, 2016	(United States) Oceanview Pavilion, Port Hueneme	
Win	25–2	(Mexico) Moises Delgadillo	UD	4 (4)	December 12, 2015	(United States) Convention Center, Tucson	
Win	24–2	(Mexico) Sergio Reyes	UD	6 (6)	August 22, 2015	(United States) Churchill County Fairgrounds, Fallon	
Loss	23–2	(United States) Fidel Maldonado, Jr.	TKO	7 (10)	November 11, 2013	(United States) Cowboys Dance Hall, San Antonio	
Loss	23–1	(United States) Ricardo Williams Jr.	RTD	5 (10)	December 8, 2012	(United States) Business Expo Center, Anaheim	
Win	23–0	(Mexico) Noe Bolaños	TKO	8 (10)	September 8, 2012	(United States) The Hangar, Costa Mesa	
Win	22–0	(Nigeria) Daniel Attah	UD	10 (10)	April 21, 2012	(United States) Don Haskins Convention Center, El Paso	
Win	21–0	(Mexico) Raymundo Beltran	UD	10 (10)	January 6, 2012	Fantasy Springs Casino, Indio, California	Won vacant NABA USA lightweight title
Win	20–0	(United States) David Rodela	KO	5 (10), (1:57)	September 30, 2011	Orange County Fairgrounds, Costa Mesa, California	
Win	19–0	(Dominican Republic) Francisco Lorenzo	UD	8 (8)	June 3, 2011	Fantasy Springs Casino, Indio, California	
Win	18–0	(United States) Jose Hernandez	UD	8 (8)	March 18, 2011	Orange County Fairgrounds, Costa Mesa, California	
Win	17–0	(Puerto Rico) John Figueroa	UD	8 (8)	September 17, 2010	Parking Lot 7 at LA Live, Los Angeles, California	
Win	16–0	(Ghana) Joshua Allotey	UD	8 (8))	June 18, 2010	Convention Center, McAllen, Texas	
Win	15–0	(United States) Allen Litzau	TKO	2 (8), (0:55)	May 1, 2010	MGM Grand, Las Vegas, Nevada	
Win	14–0	(Colombia) Walter Estrada	UD	4 (4)	February 25, 2010	Club Nokia, Los Angeles, California	
Win	13–0	(Mexico) Cristian Favela	UD	6 (6)	September 24, 2009	Hard Rock Hotel and Casino, Las Vegas, Nevada	
Win	12–0	(Mexico) Sandro Marcos	TKO	6 (6), (0:59)	July 30, 2009	Club Nokia, Los Angeles, California	
Win	11–0	(Mexico) Baudel Cardenas	KO	5 (6), (2:26)	June 11, 2009	Club Nokia, Los Angeles, California	
Win	10–0	(Nicaragua) Anthony Martinez	UD	4 (4)	March 7, 2009	HP Pavilion, San Jose, California	
Win	9–0	(United States) Justo Vallecillo	UD	6 (6)	December 11, 2008	Marriott Hotel, Irvine, California	
Win	8–0	(Puerto Rico) Sadot Vazquez	UD	6 (6)	October 24, 2008	Doubletree Hotel, Ontario, California	
Win	7–0	(Puerto Rico) Celestino Rodriguez	TKO	1 (6), (2:30)	September 26, 2008	Doubletree Hotel, Ontario, California	
Win	6–0	(Mexico) Aaron Dominguez	RTD	5 (6), (3:00)	July 30, 2008	Sycuan Resort & Casino, El Cajon, California	
Win	5–0	(Mexico) Noe Jimenez	KO	1 (4), (2:30)	June 27, 2008	Doubletree Hotel, Ontario, California	
Win	4–0	(United States) Michaelangelo Lynks	UD	4 (4)	April 24, 2008	Marriott Hotel, Irvine, California	
Win	3–0	(Puerto Rico) Daniel Lorenzana	UD	4 (4)	February 21, 2008	Marriott Hotel, Irvine, California	
Win	2–0	(United States) Terrence Harris	TKO	1 (4), (1:44)	November 29, 2007	Marriott Hotel, Irvine, California	
Win	1–0	(Puerto Rico) Christian Jose Reyes	KO	1 (4), (2:17)	October 19, 2007	Doubletree Hotel, Irvine, California	
