= Alberto Garza =

Mexican boxer (born 1985)

Personal information
- Nickname: Q
- Born: Alberto Jesús Garza; 6 June 1985 (age 41) Mexico City, Mexico
- Height: 1.80 m (5 ft 11 in)
- Weight: Featherweight; Super featherweight

Boxing career
- Reach: 183 cm (72 in)
- Stance: Orthodox

Boxing record
- Total fights: 37
- Wins: 26
- Win by KO: 21
- Losses: 9
- Draws: 1
- No contests: 1

Alberto Jesús Garza (born 6 June 1985) is a Mexican former professional boxer who competed from 2003 to 2014. He challenged for the WBA featherweight title in 2013.

== Professional career ==
In April 2009, Garza knocked out Genaro Camargo and won the WBC Continental Americas featherweight title.

On 20 November 2010, Garza upset an undefeated champion, Justin Savi to win the WBC Silver Featherweight title.
