= Kenny Adams =

American boxer and trainer (1940–2025)

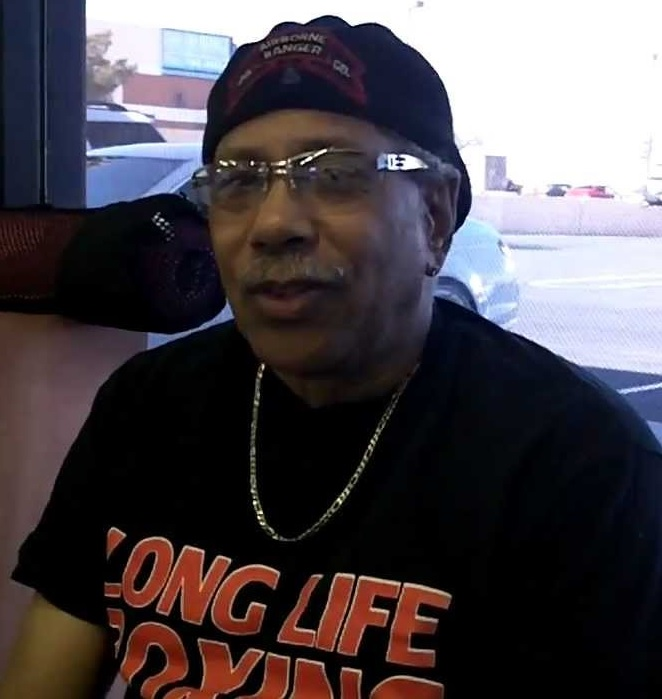
- Adams in 2008

Personal information
- Nicknames: The Master; Old School; King Kenny; Little Sugar
- Nationality: American
- Born: September 25, 1940 Springfield, Missouri, U.S.
- Died: April 7, 2025 (aged 84)
- Weight: Flyweight; Bantamweight

Boxing career
- Stance: Orthodox

Kenneth Adams (September 25, 1940 – April 7, 2025) was an American professional boxing trainer and onetime Olympic amateur boxer. Adams was a highly respected boxing trainer. Adams was a pioneer in boxing, having been the first American trainer to implement strength training. He was also the first African-American selected as head coach of the American national boxing team. Adams brought such a strict disciplinarian training style that the eight-time, five-division World champion Floyd Mayweather Jr. refused to work with him. In 1999, the multiple-time World champion Wladimir Klitschko asked Adams to assist him in properly turning over his fist on the left hook for power. In 2005, eight-division World champion Manny Pacquiao requested to train with Adams, but Adams declined in order to aid his ill wife at the time.

Adams was the boxing coach of twenty-six professional World champions, thirty four Olympians and a total of fifty-six boxers who became World Champion. This list includes Edwin Valero, Vince Phillips, Diego Corrales, Freddie Norwood, Charles Murray, Kennedy McKinney, Frankie Liles, Michael Nunn, Johnny Tapia, Ruslan Chagaev, Samuel Peter, Cory Spinks, and Michael Bentt. Adams also trained notable boxers Evander Holyfield, Pernell Whitaker, Roy Jones Jr., and Riddick Bowe in the Summer Olympic Games with Team USA.

Adams is considered a legend among boxing culture, once going 22 straight World championship bouts without a loss.

Adams' last most promising boxer was lightweight contender Sharif Bogere. Adams later retired from the sport due to health issues.

He came out of retirement in 2018 and started training Dee-Jay Kriel while he was a WBC International Champion and went on to win an IBF world title at minimumweight.

Adams was inducted into the International Boxing Hall of Fame in the Non-Participant category as part of the class of 2024.

== Boxing career ==
Adams grew up with 5 brothers and 4 sisters. He first became interested in boxing when he was 5 or 6, and he admits to always fighting as a little kid. Adams is on record as saying that he had a reputation although he was small in stature, he packed quick hands and was brave. He also learned how to curse at a very young age from being around people in the pub where he grew up. Once as a kid in gym class, Adams knocked an older boy out that outweighed him by over one hundred pounds.

Adams never had a trainer, having his first amateur fight at the age of 12 at a weight of 95 pounds. He had a successful amateur career, winning all Army and Service championships, as well as the East Coast & Florida AU’s titles fighting at Flyweight and Bantamweight. He was nicknamed “Little Sugar” as his good friend Ray Owens, who was a 1964 Olympic alternate, was known as “Big Sugar” both in homage to the great Sugar Ray Robinson.

By 17 years old he was in the army and continued to box, but never elected to turn professional. When he was 26 years old, he was offered a pro contract. He considered it, but came to the conclusion that he only boxed for the love of the sport – never for the money. Adams fought in over 200 bouts as an amateur.

Adams considered Carlton Brooks, Pat Nappi, Barron Walker, Bernie Callahan and Thomas Boudion as his boxing teachers.

== Military service ==
Adams would go on to complete 30 years of service during which he served in Vietnam and was in the 101 Airborne Division, where as part of a 5-man team he went behind enemy lines.

While serving, Adams was in charge of constructing and training the United States Army team, who had been losing to Germany handily. Adams made a strong emphasis in that the fighters were in shape and were sound technically. After much success against the Germans, Adams grew confident in his abilities to coach and was invited to bring a team to the German Olympic training camp. There and then, Adams would become the first American ever to implement strength training into boxing. Adams also utilized plyometrics to boost the fighters cardio and wind.

== Boxing trainer ==
After completing his service time, Adams would assist the 1984 American Olympic team in achieving 9 gold medals, one silver and one bronze. His students would include future World champions in Evander Holyfield, Meldrick Taylor, Pernell Whitaker, Mark Breland, Frank Tate, Henry Tillman, and Virgil Hill.

Four years later, he moved up as head trainer for the 1988 American Olympic team. Adams was suspended for six months for assaulting USA/ABF controller J. Kersten Dahl in an incident at the federation's headquarters in Colorado Springs, Colorado. The two engaged in a shouting match that ended with Adams grabbing him by the throat. Adams would be reinstated after he appealed the decision to the federation's board of directors.

He was again very successful winning three gold medals, three silver, and two bronze. His students would include even more future world champions in Roy Jones Jr., Riddick Bowe, Michael Carbajal, Kennedy McKinney, Kenneth Gould, Anthony Hembrick, Andrew Maynard, and Ray Mercer. Many believe that Roy Jones Jr. was robbed of the gold medal in the final against Park Si-hun of South Korea. Adams similarly believed that Michael Carbajal also suffered the same fate. To add, Adams believed that the Riddick Bowe fight was stopped prematurely against Lennox Lewis of Canada.

At the professional level, his first world champion was Rene Jacquot of France, who stunned Donald Curry in 1989 in what was voted "Upset of the Year" by The Ring magazine. His first American champion was Eddie Cook, who stopped Israel Contreras in early 1992.

At the professional level, Adams also trained world champions in William Abelyan, Michael Bentt, Al Cole, Diego Corrales, B.J. Flores, Michael Nunn, Johnny Tapia, Samuel Peter, Ruslan Chagaev, Cory Spinks, Frankie Liles, Kennedy McKinney, Ray Mercer, Charles Murray, Freddie Norwood, Vince Phillips, and James Kirkland (briefly after his second prison stint).

Adams trained lightweight contender Sharif Bogere, middleweight Bastie Samir, and Cuban amateur standout lightweight Raul Cespedes out of the Long Life Fighter Gym in Las Vegas, Nevada.

== Style and philosophy ==
Adams marveled at studying and watching his opponents' films and tapes. He was known for successfully predicting in what round and with what combination his fighter would win. He was also known for never losing a re-match with any opponent, due to his great ability to make adjustments after the first fight. One of Adams' many sayings is "nobody beats me twice!".

Adams brought an extremely strict disciplinarian style to the gym with him. He demanded a strong work ethic and he lived with the mentality that he was always the boss – it was his way or the highway. Adams exclaimed that “they asked me to work with Floyd Mayweather Jr. back in the late 90s and early 2000s, so I headed over to the gym and was working out with another guy out front. When he showed up, he had one of his guys come and tell me he was ready for me out back. I told his guy that 'I'm the boss' and to come out front. In the end, we went our own separate ways.”

Adams worked with the undisciplined World champion Edwin Valero up until his death in 2010. Adams stated that “Valero always used to try to overrule people, but I was always up with him. The way I catch mitts I think drew him to me. I'd bust a cat upside the head if his defense wasn't working. So when he made mistakes, I'd bust him by the side of his head. I think he respected that because most people didn't stand up to him".

Adams was a strong believer in the "hit and don't get hit" style of boxing. He mastered the defensive art of "stepping to the side, using angles and moving your head". He believed that his fighters would have longer careers if they could master his defensive techniques, while also learning his gritty, offensive attacks.

== Illness and death ==
In late November 2010, Adams, then aged 69, was admitted to a hospital in Las Vegas when his bladder and prostate swelled up, leaving him close to kidney failure. He recovered very quickly, in time to be ringside to see his fighter Sharif Bogere win on the undercard of Khan-Miadana in mid December. Adams was back on the mitts just two days later.

Adams died on April 7, 2025, at the age of 84.

== Honors ==
- Two-time "Coach of the Year"
- Ring Magazine "Upset of the Year" (Rene Jacquot) in 1992.
- Won three gold medals, three silver and two bronze in the 1988 Summer Olympics (USA).
- Won nine gold medals, one silver and one bronze in the 1984 Summer Olympics (USA).
- Won every Army and Service championship fighting at flyweight (amateur).
- Won East Coast & Florida AU’s titles fighting at bantamweight (amateur).
- Inducted into the Nevada Boxing Hall of Fame in July 2016.

== Notable boxers trained ==
=== Key ===
^{−}	Former World Champions
*	Current World Champions

Nationality	Name	Weight Class	Notes
(Armenia) Armenian	^{−}William Abelyan	Featherweight	
(United States) American	^{−}Michael Bentt	Heavyweight	
(Uganda) Ugandan	Sharif Bogere	Lightweight	
(United States) American	^{−}Riddick Bowe	Heavyweight	
(United States) American	^{−}Mark Breland	Welterweight	Only for 1984 Olympics
(United States) American	^{−}Michael Carbajal	Light Flyweight	Only for 1988 Olympics
(United States) American	Israel Cardona	Lightweight	Only for Paul Spadafora fight
(Russia) Russian	^{−}Ruslan Chagaev	Heavyweight	
(United States) American	^{−}Al Cole	Heavyweight	
(United States) American	^{−}Eddie Cook	Bantamweight	First pro USA Champion (1992)
(United States) American	^{−}Diego Corrales	Lightweight	
(United States) American	^{−}B. J. Flores	Cruiserweight	
(United States) American	Kenneth Gould	Welterweight	Only for 1988 Olympics
(United States) American	Andrew Maynard	Light Heavyweight	Only for 1988 Olympics
(United States) American	Anthony Hembrick	Middleweight	Only for 1988 Olympics
(United States) American	^{−}Virgil Hill	Light Heavyweight	Only for 1984 Olympics
(United States) American	^{−}Evander Holyfield	Light Heavyweight	
(Federation of Rhodesia and Nyasaland) France	^{−}René Jacquot	Light Middleweight	First pro Champion (1989)
(United States) American	^{−}Roy Jones Jr.	Light Middleweight	
(United States) American	^{−}James Kirkland	Light Middleweight	Briefly after his second prison stint
(United States) American	Deandre Latimore	Light Middleweight	
(United States) American	^{−}Frankie Liles	Super Middleweight	
(Venezuela) Venezuelan	^{−}Jorge Linares	Lightweight	
(United States) American	^{−}Ray Mercer	Heavyweight	
(United States) American	^{−}Kennedy McKinney	Bantamweight	
(United States) American	^{−}Charles Murray	Light Welterweight	
(United States) American	^{−}Freddie Norwood	Featherweight	
(United States) American	^{−}Michael Nunn	Middleweight	
(Nigeria) Nigerian	^{−}Samuel Peter	Heavyweight	
(United States) American	^{−}Vince Phillips	Light Welterweight	
(United States) American	^{−}David Reid	Light Middleweight	
(Kenya) Kenyan	Chris Sande	Middleweight	
(United States) American	^{−}Cory Spinks	Middleweight	
(United States) American	^{−}Johnny Tapia	Super Flyweight	
(United States) American	^{−}Frank Tate	Middleweight	Only for 1984 Olympics
(United States) American	Henry Tillman	Heavyweight	
(United States) American	^{−}Meldrick Taylor	Light Welterweight	Only for 1984 Olympics
(Venezuela) Venezuelan	^{−}Edwin Valero	Lightweight	
(Kenya) Kenyan	Robert Wangila	Welterweight	
(United States) American	^{−}Pernell Whitaker	Lightweight	Only for 1984 Olympics

== Notable mixed martial artists trained ==
=== Key ===
^{−}	Former World Champions
*	Current World Champions

Nationality	Name	Weight Class	Notes
(United States) American	^{−}Keith Berry	Light Heavyweight	UFC
(United States) American	^{−}Frank Mir	Heavyweight	UFC
