= World Boxing Council Ukraine =

Sanctioning organization for professional boxing bouts

- Abbreviation: WBC Ukraine
- Formation: 2021; 5 years ago
- Type: Non-profit institution
- Purpose: Boxing sanctioning organization
- Headquarters: Kyiv, Ukraine
- Region served: Worldwide, Ukraine
- Official language: English, Ukraine
- President: Mykola Kovalchuk
- Main organ: General Assembly
- Parent organization: World Boxing Council
- Website: wbc-ukraine.com/uk/

The World Boxing Council Ukraine (abbreviated WBC Ukraine) is a public and professional boxing organization that sanctions title fights in Ukraine. It is a member of the world professional boxing governing body World Boxing Council in Ukraine (WBC). The opening of the WBC office in Ukraine took place on August 10, 2021 in Kyiv. Ukraine.

== History ==
The idea of establishing the WBC Ukraine office emerged long before its official opening. Following the 56th WBC Convention in Kyiv, hosted and organized by Vitali Klitschko—the only “eternal” WBC Champion in history - the concept was conceived, and the initial steps toward founding WBC Ukraine were taken. At the 57th WBC Convention in Cancun, Mykola Kovalchuk discussed with the organizing team the opening of an office in Ukraine, with the support of the President of the National Professional Boxing League of Ukraine Mykhailo Zavialov and WBC Ambassador Chico Lopez. Mykola Kovalchuk has been selected as the President of World Boxing Council Ukraine.

== WBC Ukraine activities ==
The entire WBC Ukraine office team has now focused its efforts on supporting Ukraine during the war and has launched the “WBC Cares Ukraine” Charitable Fund.

=== WBC Cares Ukraine ===
The WBC Ukraine headquarters arranged a visit to hospitals and care centers for orphaned or at-risk children, where they conducted open training sessions and skill-building activities for both boys and girls. Several boxing tournaments were organized throughout Ukraine to help develop young athletes and motivate them to excel in their matches. Each young boxer received special diplomas and medals for their participation, with former world champion and WBC ambassador Oleksandr Gvozdyk personally signing the gloves of the top male and female competitors. WBC Cares Ukraine also supported volunteers working in animal shelters. In addition to youth tournaments, boxing competitions were held for cadets from the National University of Ukraine's military unit, with the best athletes being awarded WBC medals and diplomas. To promote peace in Ukraine, and in collaboration with OPUS, the Luxury Book Company released a special edition of WBC Greatest Fights, which features a collection of the most memorable bouts in WBC history.

== See also ==
- World Boxing Council (WBC)
- European Boxing Union (EBU)
