= Angelo Santana =

Cuban boxer

Personal information
- Nicknames: La Cobra; The Cobra
- Nationality: Cuba
- Born: Carlos Angelo Santana; April 19, 1988 (age 38) San Cristóbal, Pinar del Rio
- Weight: Light welterweight

Boxing career
- Stance: Southpaw

Boxing record
- Total fights: 16
- Wins: 14
- Win by KO: 11
- Losses: 2
- Draws: 0
- No contests: 0

Carlos Angelo Santana (born 19 April 1988) is a Cuban professional boxer, fighting out of Miami, Florida, promoted by Don King.

== Early life and amateur career ==
Santana was born the middle brother among the three sons of Pedro and Felicia Santana. He is a member of a boxing family as his father and uncle are former national champions. Encouraged by his father, Santana started boxing at an early age, which led his father to turn into his amateur trainer. He was not allowed to travel abroad due to the fact that some of his family members are defectors to the United States. In order to reunite with his girlfriend Anay and achieve higher life standards, he sailed to Florida on a raft made of wood and tire inner tubes on a three-day journey in September 2007. After 10 days he arrived in the US where he met Don King who instantly became his promoter for professional boxing. He ended his amateur boxing career with a record of 180 wins and 3 losses.

== Professional career ==
Four months after arriving in the US, he had his professional debut against Kenny Keaton in a potential 4-rounder in which he mismatched his opponent in the first round via TKO. He won his first 4 bouts with stoppers in initial rounds.

He moved his weight level up and had his first bout at 140 lbs (63.5 kg) and faced Ramzan Adaev from Russia for WBA Fedecaribe Light Welterweight title in Hard Rock Hotel and Casino, Las Vegas in which he got through via doctor stoppage TKO in round 2. This was the first pro-defeat for Adaev. Santana kept training along with Jorge Rubio at the Xtreme Gym in Hialeah, Miami. He has matched up Beninese Justin Savi on 23 June.

== Professional boxing record ==
14 Wins (11 knockouts), 2 Losses (1 knockout), 0 Draws
Res.	Record	Opponent	Type	Rnd. Time	Date	Location	Notes
Loss	14-2	(United States) Hank Lundy	UD	10	2014-02-21	Cleveland, Ohio, United States	
Loss	14-1	(Uzbekistan) Bahodir Mamadjonov	TKO	9 (12), 0:51	2013-04-12	Las Vegas, Nevada, United States	For vacant WBA International Lightweight title
Win	14-0	(United States) Johnny Garcia	KO	5 (10), 1:41	2012-11-16	Miami Jai Alai Fronton, United States	
Win	13-0	(Benin) Justin Savi	TKO	3 (10), 1:51	2011-06-23	Las Vegas, Nevada, United States	
Win	12-0	(United States) Broderick Antoine	TKO	1 (9), 2:52	2011-11-05	Miami, Florida, United States	Retained WBA Fedecaribe Light Welterweight title
Win	11-0	(Russia) Ramzan Adaev	TKO	2 (9), 2:02	Aug 13, 2011	The Joint, Las Vegas, Nevada, United States	Won WBA Fedecaribe Light Welterweight title
Win	10-0	(United States) John David Charles	TKO	3 (8), 2:59	2010-12-17	Miami, Florida, United States	
Win	9-0	(United States) Darryl Watson	TKO	1 (4), 2:32	2010-06-18	Corbin, Kentucky, United States	
Win	8-0	(United States) Darien Ford	TKO	4 (6)	2010-03-06	Uncasville, Connecticut, United States	
Win	7-0	(United States) Miguel Gonzalez	UD	6	2009-10-31	Las Vegas, Nevada, United States	
Win	6-0	(United States) Jaime Rodriguez	UD	4	2009-07-11	Sunrise, Florida, United States	
Win	5-0	(Mexico) Mario Garcia Vargas	TKO	2 (4), 1:36	2009-02-14	Sunrise, Florida, United States	
Win	4-0	(United States) Anthony Woods	UD	4	2008-09-26	Miami, Florida, United States	
Win	3-0	(United States) Alain Olivero	TKO	1 (4), 0:18	2008-07-18	Miami, Florida, United States	
Win	2-0	(United States) Rasool Shakoor	KO	1 (4), 0:28	2008-03-27	Saint Louis, Missouri, United States	
Win	1-0	(United States) Kenny Keaton	TKO	1 (4), 0:33	2008-01-19	New York, New York, United States	
