= Francisco Contreras (boxer) =

Dominican boxer (born 1984)

Personal information
- Nickname: The Phenom
- Nationality: Dominican
- Born: 24 March 1984 (age 42) La Romana, Dominican Republic
- Height: 175 cm (5 ft 9 in)
- Weight: Light welterweight Lightweight

Boxing career
- Reach: 182 cm (72 in)
- Stance: Orthodox

Boxing record
- Total fights: 46
- Wins: 31
- Win by KO: 24
- Losses: 15
- Draws: 0
- No contests: 0

Francisco Contreras (born 21 March 1984) is a Dominican boxer. He is trained by former world champion Robert Garcia.

== Biography ==
Contreras was raised in a poor family, he first entered a boxing gym at the age of five. His father Bonifacio was also a boxer and even had two brothers who were also boxers.

Contreras was a member of the Dominican national team and ended his amateur career with a record of 350–14.

In September 2008, Contreras beat José Herley Zúñiga Montaño to win the WBC CABOFE light welterweight title.
