= Cyril Thomas (boxer) =

French boxer

Cyril Thomas (born October 30, 1976) is a professional boxer from France.

Thomas was born in Saint-Quentin, Aisne, France, where he also lives. The orthodox stance featherweight fighter has a professional record of 44 fights: 36 wins (10 KO), four losses and four draws.

Thomas is a former France and European featherweight champion.
