= World Boxing Council =

Sanctioning organization for professional boxing bouts

- Abbreviation: WBC
- Formation: 1963; 63 years ago
- Type: Non-profit institution
- Purpose: Boxing sanctioning organization
- Headquarters: Mexico City, Mexico
- Region served: Worldwide
- President: Mauricio Sulaimán
- Main organ: General Assembly
- Website: wbcboxing.com

The World Boxing Council (WBC) is an international professional boxing organization. It is among the four major organizations which sanction professional boxing bouts, alongside the World Boxing Association (WBA), International Boxing Federation (IBF) and World Boxing Organization (WBO).

Many historically high-profile bouts have been sanctioned by the organization with various notable fighters having been recognised as WBC world champions. All four organizations recognise the legitimacy of each other and each have interwoven histories dating back several decades.

== History ==
The WBC was initially established by 11 countries: the United States, Argentina, United Kingdom, France, Mexico, Tunisia, the Philippines, Panama, USSR, Chile, Peru, Venezuela and Brazil. Representatives met in Mexico City on 14 February 1963, upon invitation of Adolfo López Mateos, then President of Mexico, to form an international organization to unify all commissions of the world to control the expansion of boxing.

The groups that historically had recognized several boxers as champions included the New York State Athletic Commission (NYSAC), the National Boxing Association (NBA) of the United States, the European Boxing Union (EBU) and the British Boxing Board of Control (BBBC); but for the most part, these groups lacked the all-encompassing 'international' status they claimed.

Today, it has 161 member countries. The current WBC President is Mauricio Sulaimán. Former Presidents include Luis Spota and Ramon G. Velázquez of Mexico, Justiniano N. Montano Jr. of the Philippines and José Sulaimán of Mexico from 1975 until his death in 2014.

In response to the Russian invasion of Ukraine, the Council blocked championship fights involving Russian and Belarusian boxers.

=== Championship ===
The WBC's green championship belt portrays the flags of all of the 161 member countries of the organization. All WBC world title belts look identical regardless of weight class; however, there are minor variations on the design for secondary and regionally themed titles within the same weight class.

The WBC has nine regional governing bodies affiliated with it, such as the North American Boxing Federation, the Oriental and Pacific Boxing Federation, the European Boxing Union, and the African Boxing Union.

Although rivals, the WBC's relationship with other sanctioning bodies has improved over time and there have even been talks of unification with the WBA. Unification bouts between WBC and other organizations' champions are becoming more common in recent years. Throughout its history, the WBC has allowed some of its organization's champions to fight unification fights with champions of other organizations, although there were times it stepped in to prevent such fights. For many years, it also prevented its champions from holding the WBO belt. When a WBO-recognized champion wished to fight for a WBC championship, he had to abandon his WBO title first, without any special considerations. This, however, is no longer the case.

In 1983, following the death of Kim Duk-koo from injuries sustained in a 14-round fight against Ray Mancini, the WBC took the unprecedented step of reducing the distance of its world championship bouts, from 15 rounds to 12 — a move other organizations soon followed for boxers' safety.

Among those to have been recognized by the WBC as world champions are the undefeated and undisputed champions Manny Pacquiao, Terence Crawford, Errol Spence Jr., Joe Calzaghe, Floyd Mayweather Jr., Roy Jones Jr., Wilfred Benítez, Wilfredo Gómez, Julio César Chávez, Muhammad Ali, Joe Frazier, Larry Holmes, Sugar Ray Leonard, Thomas Hearns, Mike Tyson, Salvador Sánchez, Héctor Camacho, Marvin Hagler, Carlos Monzón, Rodrigo Valdez, Roberto Durán, Juan Laporte, Félix Trinidad, Edwin Rosario, Bernard Hopkins, Alexis Argüello, Nigel Benn, Lennox Lewis, Vitali Klitschko, Érik Morales, Miguel Cotto, Naoya Inoue, Oleksandr Usyk, Canelo Álvarez, Tony Bellew, Mairis Briedis, and Grigory Drozd.

At its discretion, the WBC may designate and recognize, upon a two-thirds majority vote of its Board of Governors, one or more emeritus world champions in each weight class. Such a recognition is for life and is only bestowed upon present or past WBC world champions. The following boxers have earned the "Emeritus Championship" appellation throughout their careers: Lennox Lewis, Vitali Klitschko, Roy Jones Jr., Bernard Hopkins (Honorary Champion), Mikkel Kessler, Sergio Martínez, Andre Ward, Floyd Mayweather Jr., Kostya Tszyu, Manny Pacquiao, Danny García, Érik Morales, Toshiaki Nishioka, Vic Darchinyan, Édgar Sosa, Tony Bellew, Jelena Mrdjenovich, and Katie Taylor. This allows the fighters, should they return to competition, to take part in a title bout in the division they have been crowned emeritus champion. During the WBC's 51st Convention in Bangkok, Thailand, Floyd Mayweather Jr. was named "Supreme Champion", a designation that nobody before him has ever achieved.

The WBC bolstered the legitimacy of women's boxing by recognizing fighters such as Christy Martin and Lucia Rijker as contenders for female world titles in 16 weight divisions. The first WBC World Female Champion (on 30 May 2005) was the super bantamweight Jackie Nava from Mexico. With her former-champion father at ringside, Laila Ali won the super middleweight title on 11 June 2005.

=== Silver Championship ===
In 2010, the WBC created a "Silver Championship", intended as a replacement for interim titles. Justin Savi was the first boxer to win a Silver title after defeating Cyril Thomas on 16 April 2010. Unlike its interim predecessor, a boxer holding the Silver title cannot automatically inherit a full world title vacated by the champion. The WBC continues to recognize interim and Silver Champions, as well as interim Silver Champions. A year later, the WBC introduced Silver versions to its International titles. As of 2020, there are Silver titles of the female world title, Youth World title, USNBC title, Latino title and also FECARBOX title.

=== Diamond Championship ===
In September 2009, the WBC created its new "Diamond Championship" belt. This belt was created as an honorary championship exclusively to award the winner of a historic fight between two high-profile and elite boxers. The inaugural Diamond belt was awarded on 14 November 2009 to Manny Pacquiao, who won his 7th world title (in seven different divisions) via a 12th-round technical knockout (TKO) over Miguel Cotto at welterweight in Las Vegas, Nevada, United States. Other holders of this title have included Mairis Briedis (cruiserweight), Oleksandr Usyk, Bernard Hopkins (light heavyweight), Callum Smith (super middleweight), Sergio Martínez and Canelo Álvarez (middleweight), Floyd Mayweather Jr. (super welterweight), Errol Spence Jr. (welterweight), Regis Prograis and Josh Taylor (super lightweight), Nonito Donaire (super bantamweight and bantamweight), Naoya Inoue (super bantamweight and bantamweight), Léo Santa Cruz (featherweight), Jean Pascal and Sergey Kovalev (light heavyweight), Mikey Garcia (welterweight and super lightweight), Jorge Linares (lightweight), Alexander Povetkin (heavyweight), and Román González (super flyweight). At the WBC convention in December 2012, Muhammad Ali was awarded an honorary WBC Diamond belt. Female Diamond champions have included Claressa Shields (middleweight), Amanda Serrano (super bantamweight), Ana María Torres (bantamweight), Raja Amasheh (super flyweight), Ava Knight and Jessica Chávez (flyweight). Although this title can be defended, it is not a mandatory requirement. The title can also be vacated in the case of a fighter's long-term absence or retirement from boxing.

=== Franchise Championship ===
In 2019, the WBC Franchise Championship was introduced as an honorary title awarded to dominant champions that have represented the WBC and is a special designation and status which the WBC may honor to a current WBC World Champion, who is also an elite active fighter who has achieved and maintains the highest stature in the sport. Boxers who has been given the honorary title, must vacate their WBC world title in that division as the honorary title is transferable. Boxers who have been named WBC Franchise Champion include: Canelo Alvarez (middleweight; 2019–2020), Vasiliy Lomachenko (lightweight; 2019–2020), Teófimo López (lightweight; 2020–2021), Juan Francisco Estrada (super flyweight; since 2021), and George Kambosos Jr. (lightweight; 2021–2022).

=== Eternal Championship ===
The WBC Eternal Championship is an honorary title awarded to retired boxers that have never lost the WBC world title in the ring while having a solid number of successful title defenses. Jiselle Salandy was awarded the Eternal title as she defended the WBC female super welterweight title five times before her death on 4 January 2009. On 12 December 2016, Vitali Klitschko was recognized as "Eternal Champion", as he had 10 successful WBC heavyweight title defenses during his career before his retirement in 2013 and was never knocked down throughout his career either. Former WBC light flyweight and flyweight champion Ibeth Zamora Silva was also named Eternal Champion.

=== Commemorative World Championship Belts ===
The WBC also awards commemorative world championship belts to certain individuals or groups as trophies for winning historic fights or exhibition matches.

- 24K Gold — Floyd Mayweather Jr. (September 14, 2013)
- Emerald — Floyd Mayweather Jr. (May 2, 2015)
- Onyx — Joe Smith Jr. (December 17, 2016)
- Huichol I — Canelo Álvarez (May 6, 2017)
- Money — Floyd Mayweather Jr. (August 26, 2017)
- Huichol II — Gennady Golovkin (September 16, 2017)
- Chiapaneco I — Gennady Golovkin (May 5, 2018)
- Chiapaneco II — Canelo Álvarez (September 15, 2018)
- Maya I — Canelo Álvarez (May 4, 2019)
- Maya II — Tyson Fury (September 14, 2019)
- Mazahua — Heroes of Humanity (May 5, 2020)
- Otomi — Julio César Chávez and Jorge Arce (September 25, 2020)
- Frontline Battle — Mike Tyson and Roy Jones Jr. (November 28, 2020)
- Health Care Hero — Errol Spence Jr. (December 5, 2020)
- Mestizo — Canelo Álvarez (May 8, 2021)
- Freedom 2021 — Jermall Charlo (June 19, 2021)
- Teotihuacan — Canelo Álvarez (November 6, 2021)
- Union — Tyson Fury (April 23, 2022)
- Celtic-Boricua — Katie Taylor (April 30, 2022)
- Ubuntu African Spirit — Ludumo Lamati (May 22, 2022)
- Guerrero Jaguar Zapoteca — Canelo Álvarez (September 17, 2022)
- Elizabethan — Claressa Shields (October 15, 2022)
- Diriyah — Tommy Fury (February 26, 2023)
- Puebla-Jalisco — Canelo Álvarez (May 6, 2023)
- Freedom 2023 — Floyd Mayweather Jr. (June 11, 2023)
- Puebla — Canelo Alvarez (September 30, 2023)
- Riyadh Champion — Tyson Fury (October 28, 2023)
- Super Bowl LVIII — Kansas City Chiefs (February 11, 2024)
- Tamaulipas I — Canelo Álvarez (May 4, 2024)
- Undisputed I — Oleksandr Usyk (May 18, 2024)
- Freedom 2024 — Gary Russell Sr. (posthumous) (June 14, 2024)
- Tamaulipas II — Canelo Álvarez (September 14, 2024)
- Rumble in the Jungle — Oleksandr Usyk (December 21, 2024)
- Guerrero Azteca I — Isaac Cruz (February 1, 2025)
- Super Bowl LIX — Philadelphia Eagles (February 9, 2025)
- Undisputed II — Dmitry Bivol (February 22, 2025)
- Homecoming — Tiara Brown (March 22, 2025)
- Kun Khmer — Government of Cambodia (March 31, 2025)
- Xicotencatl — Canelo Álvarez (May 3, 2025)
- Gray in May — Naoya Inoue (May 4, 2025)
- Freedom 2025 — Franchón Crews-Dezurn (June 6, 2025)
- Africa — Andrew Tabiti (June 13, 2025)
- Guerrero Azteca II — Manny Pacquiao and Sebastian Fundora (July 29, 2025)
- Nahui Huey Altepemeh — Terence Crawford (September 13, 2025)
- Reynosa Tamaulipas — Miguel Berchelt (October 11, 2025)
- Brooklyn Brawler — Danny Garcia (October 18, 2025)
- Dia de Muertos — Vergil Ortiz Jr. and Gabriela Sánchez (November 8, 2025)
- Super Bowl XX — Chicago Bears (November 8, 2025)
- Samurai — Takuma Inoue (November 24, 2025)
- Dėl šlovės — Egidijus Kavaliauskas (November 28, 2025)
- Mental Health — Noel Mikaelian (December 13, 2025)
- Tollan Tlatequi — David Benavidez (May 2, 2026)
- King of the Nile — Oleksandr Usyk (May 23, 2026)
- Freedom 2026 — Tiara Brown (June 13, 2026)
- Independence — Bruce Carrington (July 4, 2026)
- Metta Humanitarian — Tyson Fury (July 24, 2026)
- Queen of the Celts — Katie Taylor (September 5, 2026)
- Tollan Topiltzin — Ryan Garcia (September 12, 2026)

=== WBC Crown Series ===
==== Undisputed Championship Ring ====
In conjunction with Rasheen Farlow (WBC Crown Series Creator) and Jason of Beverly Hills, the WBC created the first-ever WBC Crown Series Undisputed Championship ring to be awarded to the winner of the undisputed world super middleweight championship bout between Canelo Álvarez and Terence Crawford.

- Terence Crawford (September 13, 2025)
- Naoya Inoue (May 2, 2026)

==== Main Event World Championship Chain and Pendant ====
In February 2026, the WBC, in conjunction with Rasheen Farlow, WBC Head of Global Brand Strategy and Cultural Partnerships and the WBC Crown Series Creator and Architect, fabricated by the Bite Club LLC unveiled the Main Event World Championship Chain and Pendant to be awarded to the winner of a WBC World Championship bout serving as the headline match.

=== Trans athletes ===
In an exclusive interview with The Telegraph in 2022, WBC President Mauricio Sulaiman said that the WBC would ban transgender fighters from competing against cisgender fighters "so the dangers of a man fighting a woman will never happen", and would instead introduce a separate trans category of competition wherein athletes would be divided by their gender assigned at birth. Sulaiman called for current fighters who may be trans to come forward and register accordingly.

== Controversies ==
In early 1998, Roy Jones Jr. announced that he was relinquishing his WBC light heavyweight title. In response, the WBC ordered a bout between Graciano Rocchigiani from Germany and the former champion Michael Nunn to fill the vacancy, sanctioning it as a world championship match. On 21 March 1998, Rocchigiani won the fight and a WBC belt; in the subsequent WBC rankings, he was listed as "Light Heavyweight World Champion".

Jones, however, had a change of heart and asked if the WBC would reinstate him as the champion. In a move that violated nearly a dozen of its own regulations, the WBC granted the reinstatement. Rocchigiani received a letter from the WBC advising that the publication of his name as champion was a typographical error and he had never been the official title holder.

Rocchigiani immediately filed a lawsuit against the WBC in a U.S. federal court, claiming that the organization's actions were both contrary to their own rules and injurious to his earning potential (due to diminished professional stature). On 7 May 2003, the judge ruled in Rocchigiani's favor, awarding him $31 million (U.S.) in damages and reinstating him as a former WBC champion (Rocchigiani had lost a bout since his WBC title match).

The following day, the WBC sought protection by filing for Chapter 11 bankruptcy (i.e., corporate debt restructuring) in Puerto Rico. The organization spent the next 13 months trying to negotiate a 6-figure settlement with Rocchigiani, but the fighter at first rejected the proposal.

On 11 June 2004, the WBC announced it would enter Chapter 7 bankruptcy liquidation (i.e., business closing and total asset sell-off) proceedings, effectively threatening its existence. This action prompted some in the boxing community to plead with Rocchigiani to settle the dispute, which he did in mid-July 2004.

=== Don King ===
Many in the boxing community have accused the WBC of bending its rules to suit the powerful boxing promoter Don King. The journalist Jack Newfield wrote, "...[WBC President José Sulaimán] became more King's junior partner than his independent regulator". Another journalist, Peter Heller, echoes that comment: "Sulaimán...became little more than an errand boy for Don King". Heller quotes British promoter Mickey Duff as saying, "My complaint is that José Sulaimán is not happy his friend Don King is the biggest promoter in boxing. Sulaimán will only be happy when Don King is the only promoter in boxing."

Newfield and Heller take issue with the following actions of the WBC:

- When Leon Spinks won the WBA and WBC Heavyweight Championships from Muhammad Ali in 1978, the WBC stripped Leon Spinks of his title. José Sulaimán said the WBC did so because Spinks was signed for a rematch with Ali instead of fighting a Don King fighter, Ken Norton. Norton defended the WBC title against another Don King fighter, Larry Holmes, who won the belt.
- In 1983, WBC Super Featherweight Champion Bobby Chacon was signed to fight Cornelius Boza-Edwards, the WBC's mandatory challenger for his title. But, the promoter Don King wanted his fighter, Héctor Camacho, to fight for the title. Although WBC rules said the mandatory challenger should receive a shot at the title, the WBC withdrew its sanction from the fight. It stripped Chacon of his title for refusing to fight Camacho.
- Under WBC rules, a fighter is supposed to defend his title against a mandatory challenger at least once a year. For fighters controlled by Don King, this rule is often ignored. For instance, Alexis Argüello and Carlos Zárate were allowed to ignore their obligations as WBC champions to their mandatory contenders.
- When WBC Super Featherweight Champion Julio César Chávez wanted to fight top contender Roger Mayweather for a promoter other than Don King, the WBC withheld its sanction of the fight until Don King became promoter.
- When Mike Tyson lost to James "Buster" Douglas during an IBF, WBC and WBA Heavyweight Championship defense, King convinced the WBC (along with the WBA) to withhold recognition of Douglas as heavyweight champion. King claimed that Tyson had won the fight by knocking Douglas down, after which the referee gave Douglas a "long count". The referee, Octavio Meyran, claims in an affidavit that King threatened to have the WBC withhold payment of his hotel bill if he did not support King's protest. Because of intense public pressure, both the WBA and WBC backed down and recognized Douglas as champion.
- In 1992, the WBC threatened to strip Evander Holyfield of his title for defending it against Riddick Bowe instead of Razor Ruddock. Holyfield obtained a court order to stop the organization. In a taped deposition for the United States Senate Permanent Subcommittee on Investigations, Holyfield said that the WBC wanted him to defend his championship against Ruddock because Ruddock was managed by King.
- During the 1990s, the WBC did not allow its champions to engage in unification bouts with WBO champions. However, in 1993, the super middleweight showdown between WBC champion Nigel Benn and WBO champion Chris Eubank, promoted by Don King, was recognized as a title unification fight by the WBC. The bout ended in a draw and each retained their respective titles.
- When Mike Tyson was released from prison in 1995, the WBC installed him as their #1 contender for their heavyweight championship. Tyson had not fought in four years, but was promoted by Don King.
- In 1993, Julio César Chávez, managed and promoted by Don King, received a majority draw against Pernell Whitaker in their WBC welterweight title fight in San Antonio, Texas. Virtually every ringside observer and boxing analyst had Whitaker winning at least 8 or 9 rounds of the 12-round fight and CompuBox statistics showed Whitaker outlanding Chávez by a wide margin. But two of the three judges had the fight scored even. The fight was promoted by King and two of the judges were not appointed by the state's boxing commission (in this case, Texas) like any other time; instead, they were appointed by the WBC. It had been reported that Don King had a hand in helping to secure the WBC judges for the fight. To this day, the resulting draw is considered one of the most controversial decisions ever.
- In 2000, Chávez, still promoted by King, was made the mandatory challenger for Kostya Tszyu's WBC super lightweight title. Chávez did not appear to satisfy requirements for a mandatory challenger: he had not fought at super lightweight for two years, had recently lost to journeyman boxer Willy Wise and had not beaten a top contender since losing to Oscar De La Hoya for the first time in 1996.
- In 2005, the WBC stripped Javier Castillejo of his super welterweight title for fighting Fernando Vargas instead of Ricardo Mayorga, a fighter promoted by Don King. The WBC qualified Mayorga for a shot at the super welterweight title although he had never fought at that weight limit and had lost two of his last three fights.

== Current WBC world title holders ==
As of 9 November 2026

=== Boxing ===
==== Male ====
Weight class	Champion	Reign began	Days
Strawweight (105 lbs)	Siyakholwa Kuse	16 May 2026	177
Light flyweight (108 lbs)	Shokichi Iwata	15 March 2026	239
Flyweight (112 lbs)	Sergio Mendoza	10 October 2026	30
Flyweight (112 lbs)	Galal Yafai (interim)	30 November 2024	709
Super flyweight (115 lbs)	Ricardo Malajika	27 September 2026	43
Bantamweight (118 lbs)	Takuma Inoue	24 November 2025	350
Super bantamweight (122 lbs)	Naoya Inoue	25 July 2023	1203
Featherweight (126 lbs)	Bruce Carrington	31 January 2026	282
Super featherweight (130 lbs)	O'Shaquie Foster	2 November 2024	737
Lightweight (135 lbs)	William Zepeda	1 August 2026	100
Lightweight (135 lbs)	Jadier Herrera (interim)	10 January 2026	303
Super lightweight (140 lbs)	Dalton Smith	10 January 2026	303
Super lightweight (140 lbs)	Isaac Cruz (interim)	19 July 2025	478
Welterweight (147 lbs)	Ryan Garcia	21 February 2026	261
Super welterweight (154 lbs)	Sebastian Fundora	30 March 2024	954
Super welterweight (154 lbs)	Vergil Ortiz Jr. (interim)	10 August 2024	821
Middleweight (160 lbs)	Carlos Adames	7 May 2024	916
Super middleweight (168 lbs)	Canelo Álvarez	31 October 2026	9
Super middleweight (168 lbs)	Lester Martinez (Interim)	21 March 2026	233
Light heavyweight (175 lbs)	Willy Hutchinson	7 November 2026	2
Cruiserweight (190 lbs)	Michał Cieślak	14 September 2026	56
Bridgerweight (224 lbs)	Ryad Merhy	30 May 2026	163
Heavyweight (225+ lbs)	Agit Kabayel	27 June 2026	135

==== Female ====
Weight class	Champion	Reign began	Days
Atomweight (102 lbs)	Camila Zamorano	15 October 2025	390
Strawweight (105 lbs)	Yokasta Valle	1 November 2024	738
Strawweight (105 lbs)	Umi Ishikawa (interim)	3 May 2024	920
Light flyweight (108 lbs)	Lourdes Juárez	29 November 2024	710
Flyweight (112 lbs)	Gabriela Fundora	2 November 2024	737
Super flyweight (115 lbs)	Adelaida Ruiz	29 November 2025	345
Super flyweight (115 lbs)	Ginny Fuchs (interim)	31 August 2024	800
Bantamweight (118 lbs)	Cherneka Johnson	11 July 2025	486
Super bantamweight (122 lbs)	Vacant		
Super bantamweight (122 lbs)	Skye Nicolson (interim)	14 December 2025	330
Featherweight (126 lbs)	Tiara Brown	22 March 2025	597
Super featherweight (130 lbs)	Caroline Veyre	10 February 2026	272
Lightweight (135 lbs)	Caroline Dubois	11 December 2024	698
Super lightweight (140 lbs)	Vacant		
Welterweight (147 lbs)	Natasha Jonas	14 December 2024	695
Super welterweight (154 lbs)	Mikaela Mayer	30 October 2025	375
Middleweight (160 lbs)	Kaye Scott	20 December 2025	324
Super middleweight (168 lbs)	Franchón Crews-Dezurn	15 December 2023	1060
Heavyweight (168+ lbs)	Claressa Shields	27 July 2024	835

== Affiliated organizations ==
- Oriental and Pacific Boxing Federation (OPBF)
- North American Boxing Federation (NABF)
- European Boxing Union (EBU)
- Asian Boxing Council (ABCO)
- African Boxing Union (ABU)
- WBC Middle East Boxing Council (WBC MEBC)
- United States National Boxing Council (USNBC)
- Caribbean Boxing Federation (CABOFE)
- Central American Boxing Federation (FECARBOX)
- CIS and Slovenian Boxing Bureau (CISBB)
- South American Continental Boxing Federation (FECONSUR)
- Hispanic World Boxing Association (ABMH)
- World Boxing Council Muaythai (WBC Muaythai)
- World Boxing Council Ukraine (WBC Ukraine)
- World Boxing Council Baltic (WBC Baltic)

== See also ==
- List of major boxing sanctioning bodies
- List of WBC world champions
- List of WBC female world champions
- List of current world boxing champions
- List of WBC international champions
- List of WBC youth champions
- WBC Legends of Boxing Museum
