= Francisco Vargas (Mexican boxer) =

Mexican boxer (born 1984)

Personal information
- Nickname: El Bandido ("The Bandit")
- Born: Francisco Javier Vargas Peláez; December 25, 1984 (age 41) Mexico City, Mexico
- Height: 173 cm (5 ft 8 in)
- Weight: Super featherweight

Boxing career
- Reach: 178 cm (70 in)
- Stance: Orthodox

Boxing record
- Total fights: 33
- Wins: 27
- Win by KO: 19
- Losses: 4
- Draws: 2
- No contests: 0
Medal record
Representing Mexico
Pan American Games
Bronze medal – third place	2003 Santo Domingo	Lightweight

Francisco Javier Vargas Peláez (born December 25, 1984) is a Mexican professional boxer, also known for his nickname "El Bandido." As an amateur, Vargas represented Mexico at the 2008 Summer Olympics as a lightweight. He held the WBC super featherweight title between 2015 and 2017.

== Amateur career ==
At the 2006 Central American Games, Vargas lost to eventual winner Yordenis Ugás 7:14. At the 2007 Pan American Games, Vargas competed at featherweight. He lost to David Souza. At the first qualifier for the 2008 Olympics, Vargas was edged out by Juan Cuellar. At the second qualifier, the 23-year-old beat Franz Mamani and the Canadian southpaw Ibrahim Kamal. Vargas was then outpointed by Brazilian Éverton Lopes 6:11 but shut out Alexis Folleco 5:0 becoming the third Mexican boxer to qualify, after Arturo Santos Reyes and Óscar Valdez. At the Olympics, Vargas defeated Jean de Dieu Soloniaina in his first bout but lost in the round of 16 to Georgian Popescu.

== Professional career ==
=== Early career ===
Vargas made his professional debut in March 2010, beating Daniel Calzada by unanimous decision.

In March 2012, Vargas signed a promotional contract with Golden Boy Promotions.

On March 31, 2012, Vargas made his debut under the Golden Boy banner with a third-round TKO of Carlos Martinez, kicking off a busy year that saw him add six more wins to his record. In January 2013, Vargas faced veteran Ira Terry, knocking him out in just two rounds. On May, Vargas stopped Cristian Arrazola in three rounds. Vargas stepped up to the plate once again on August 9, 2013, when he met fellow unbeaten fighter Brandon Bennett for the NABF and WBO Intercontinental super featherweight titles. Vargas won both belts by nearly shutting Bennett out over 10 rounds.

On December 13, 2013, Vargas won all 10 rounds in a decision victory over formerworld title challenger Jerry Belmontes. On March 8, he made his first appearance of 2014, as he defeated Puerto Rico's Abner Cotto via unanimous decision. From there, Vargas fought on the Canelo Álvarez vs. Erislandy Lara undercard and delivered a thrilling KO victory over Puerto Rican legend and former world champion Juan Manuel Lopez. He followed that up with another knockout in Mexico against Genaro Camargo. In 2015, Vargas headlined his first HBO event against prospect Will Tomlinson in San Antonio on HBO Latino. Vargas made scored his third knockout victory in a row with an eighth-round TKO.

=== WBC super featherweight champion ===
Serving as the co-main event to the highly anticipated Miguel Cotto vs. Canelo Álvarez event on November 21, 2015, Vargas faced WBC super featherweight champion Takashi Miura. Miura and Vargas both performed well and received unanimous "Fight of the Year" nods from Sports Illustrated, ESPN, The Bleacher Report, USA TODAY’s Boxing Junkie, The Sweet Science and Boxing Scene. Vargas claimed the world title via ninth-round technical knockdown over Miura after suffering a knockdown during the fourth round. ESPN called the fight “the most dramatic comeback since the late Diego Corrales used a legendary 10th-round rally to stop Jose Luis Castillo and unify lightweight titles in 2005."

It was announced in March 2016 that Vargas would be defending his title on June 4 at the StubHub Center in Carson, California against former featherweight world champion Orlando Salido. A rematch clause was attached to the contract in case Salido defeated Vargas. In what was described as another "Fight of the Year" candidate, Salido and Vargas fought to a 12-round majority draw. Two judges had it 114-114 whilst the third had it 115-113 for Vargas, who as a result retained his WBC title. Both fighters thought they had done enough to take the decision. The fight was shown on HBO’s Boxing After Dark which averaged 833,000 viewers and hit a peak of 954,000 viewers.

On December 2, 2016, it was announced that Vargas and Miguel Berchelt would meet on January 29, 2017, at the Fantasy Springs Casino in Indio, California for the Vargas' WBC title. Vargas and Berchelt traded punches in the early rounds, with cuts from Vargas' previous fights with Takashi Miura and Orlando Salido re-opening. On the latter rounds, Vargas started to slowly fade and Berchelt started to dominate the defending champion. The referee stopped the fight with 2:19 minutes elapsed in the round 11. According to CompuBox Stats, Vargas landed 330 of 1032 punches thrown (32%) and Berchelt landed 430 of his 947 thrown (45%). Vargas stated he lost the fight due to cuts and would eventually want a rematch.

=== Comeback trail ===
In October 2017, the WBC ordered an eliminator between Vargas and Jhonny González, the winner will become the mandatory challenger to the WBC's super featherweight champion. Gonzalez took a stay-busy fight on November prior to facing Vargas. It was later announced that Vargas would face Miguel Román on December, with the fight backing up a WBC title bout between Salido and Berchelt. After it was announced that Berchelt would be unable to compete on that date due to a hand injury, negotiations for a rematch between Salido and Vargas started. On October 30, Ringtv announced that Salido would fight Román, leaving Vargas with no opponent. Days later it was announced that Vargas would be fighting Stephen Smith on December 9 at the Mandalay Bay Events Center in Nevada. Vargas fought hard to defeat Smith via a 9th-round technical decision. The fight was stopped at the end of round 9 due to Smith suffering a bad cut to his ear. After 9 rounds, the judges scored the fight 89–82, 88–83, and 88-83 all in favour of Vargas.

On March 14, 2017, Vargas announced he continue his comeback trail on April 12 at Fantasy Springs Casino in California against Rod Salka (24–4, 4 KOs), who was known for his gross mismatch against Danny García in 2014. The bout was scheduled to take place live on ESPN. In front of 1,456 fans in attendance, Vargas continued his comeback trail in defeating Salka, forcing him to retire after round 6. A solid combination put Salka down in round 5. Vargas was working with trainer Joel Díaz for the first time. Vargas started the fight as he always does, beginning on the front foot throwing punches. Salka's success came when he began to counter Vargas for any shots he missed. Vargas continued with his aggressive which eventually was too much for Salka. CompuBox stats showed that Vargas landed 112 of 415 punches thrown (27%) and Salka landed 75 of his 412 thrown (18%).

His next fight was against Miguel Berchelt, a rematch for the WBC super featherweight title, which Berchelt had won off of Vargas two years before. Vargas fought well and did provide a challenge for Berchelt, but in the end Berchelt was just the sharper and the fresher fighter. Following the end round six, after Vargas had taken a lot of punishment, his corner threw in the towel.

Vargas won his comeback fight against Ezequiel Aviles. Vargas won via technical decision in the ninth round, after the fight was stopped because of cut on Vargas, caused by a headbutt. The scores at the time of stoppage were 98–94, 98-94 and 96-97 for Vargas, who was announced the winner of the fight.

== Professional boxing record ==
34 fights	27 wins	5 losses
By knockout	19	3
By decision	8	2
Draws	2	

No.	Result	Record	Opponent	Type	Round	Date	Location	Notes
33	Loss	27–5–2	(Mexico) Guillermo Avila Godinez	SD	10	Nov 18, 2022	Centro Civico de Ecatepec, Ecatepec, Mexico	
33	Loss	27–4–2	(United States) José Valenzuela	KO	1 (10), 1:25	Apr 16, 2022	(United States) AT&T Stadium, Arlington, Texas U.S.	
32	Loss	27–3–2	(Mexico) Isaac Cruz	UD	10	Jun 19, 2021	(United States) Toyota Center, Houston, Texas U.S.	
31	Win	27–2–2	(Venezuela) Otto Gamez	TKO	3 (10), 1:08	Nov 20, 2020	Plaza Las Americas, Mexico City, Mexico	
30	Win	26–2–2	(Mexico) Ezequiel Avilés	TD	9 (10)	Oct 19, 2019	Gimnasio Rodrigo M. Quevedo, Chihuahua, Mexico	
29	Loss	25–2–2	(Mexico) Miguel Berchelt	RTD	6 (12), 3:00	May 11, 2019	(United States) Convention Center, Tucson, Arizona, U.S.	For WBC super featherweight title
28	Win	25–1–2	(United States) Rod Salka	RTD	6 (10), 3:00	Apr 12, 2018	(United States) Fantasy Springs Casino, Indio, California, U.S.	
27	Win	24–1–2	(United Kingdom) Stephen Smith	TD	9 (10), 1:31	Dec 9, 2017	(United States) Mandalay Bay Events Center, Paradise, Nevada, U.S.	
26	Loss	23–1–2	(Mexico) Miguel Berchelt	KO	11 (12), 2:19	Jan 28, 2017	(United States) Fantasy Springs Casino, Indio, California, U.S.	Lost WBC super featherweight title
25	Draw	23–0–2	(Mexico) Orlando Salido	MD	12	Jun 4, 2016	(United States) StubHub Center, Carson, California, U.S.	Retained WBC super featherweight title
24	Win	23–0–1	(Japan) Takashi Miura	TKO	9 (12), 1:31	Nov 21, 2015	(United States) Mandalay Bay Events Center, Paradise, Nevada, U.S.	Won WBC super featherweight title
23	Win	22–0–1	(Australia) Will Tomlinson	TKO	8 (10), 1:30	Mar 12, 2015	(United States) Freeman Coliseum, San Antonio, Texas, U.S.	Retained NABF and WBO International super featherweight title
22	Win	21–0–1	(Mexico) Genaro Camargo	KO	8 (8), 1:12	Dec 13, 2014	Salón Las Palmas, Pesquería, Mexico	Retained NABF and WBO International super featherweight title
21	Win	20–0–1	(Puerto Rico) Juan Manuel López	RTD	3 (10), 3:00	Jul 12, 2014	(United States) MGM Grand Garden Arena, Paradise, Nevada, U.S.	Retained NABF super featherweight title Won WBO International super featherweight title
20	Win	19–0–1	(Puerto Rico) Abner Cotto	UD	10	Mar 8, 2014	(United States) MGM Grand Garden Arena, Paradise, Nevada, U.S.	
19	Win	18–0–1	(United States) Jerry Belmontes	UD	10	Dec 13, 2013	(United States) Fantasy Springs Casino, Indio, California, U.S.	Retained NABF and WBO Inter-Continental super featherweight titles
18	Win	17–0–1	(United States) Brandon Bennett	UD	10	Aug 9, 2013	(United States) Fantasy Springs Casino, Indio, California, U.S.	Won vacant NABF and vacant WBO Inter-Continental super featherweight titles
17	Win	16–0–1	(Mexico) Cristian Arrazola	TKO	3 (8), 2:04	May 17, 2013	Grand Oasis Resort, Cancún, Mexico	
16	Win	15–0–1	(United States) Ira Terry	KO	2 (10), 1:46	Jan 26, 2013	(United States) The Joint, Paradise, Nevada, U.S.	
15	Win	14–0–1	(Mexico) Carlos Jacobo	TKO	3 (10), 0:21	Nov 17, 2012	Teatro del Pueblo, Cuautlancingo, Mexico	
14	Win	13–0–1	(United States) Victor Sanchez	UD	4	Sep 15, 2012	(United States) MGM Grand Garden Arena, Paradise, Nevada, U.S.	
13	Win	12–0–1	(Puerto Rico) Irving Torres	TKO	1 (8)	Jul 7, 2012	(United States) The Hangar, Costa Mesa, California, U.S.	
12	Win	11–0–1	(Mexico) Francisco Gabriel Pina	KO	3 (8), 0:55	May 26, 2012	Grand Oasis Resort, Cancún, Mexico	
11	Win	10–0–1	(Dominican Republic) Rafael Lora	TKO	3 (6), 2:27	Apr 21, 2012	(United States) Don Haskins Center, El Paso, Texas, U.S.	
10	Win	9–0–1	(Mexico) Carlos Perez	TKO	3 (4), 1:26	Mar 31, 2012	Grand Oasis Resort, Cancún, Mexico	
9	Win	8–0–1	(Mexico) Alberto Cupido	KO	1 (6), 1:57	Dec 17, 2011	Campo de Beisbol Froylan López, Cozumel, Mexico	
8	Win	7–0–1	(Mexico) Andres Uribe	TKO	1 (6), 2:15	Nov 5, 2011	Cancún, Mexico	
7	Win	6–0–1	(Mexico) Ramiro Mendoza	TKO	1 (6), 0:37	Oct 15, 2011	Gimnasio Revolución, Calpulalpan, Mexico	
6	Win	5–0–1	(Mexico) Gonzalo Rodriguez	KO	1 (6), 2:08	Aug 13, 2011	Deportivo Tlalli, Tlalnepantla, Mexico	
5	Win	4–0–1	(Mexico) Luis Eduardo Martinez	KO	2 (6)	Jun 11, 2011	Deportivo Trabajadores del Metro, Mexico City, Mexico	
4	Draw	3–0–1	(United States) Byron Gonzalez	MD	4	Sep 25, 2010	El Foro, Tijuana, Mexico	
3	Win	3–0	(Mexico) Juan Sandoval	UD	4	Jul 3, 2010	(United States) Grand Theatre, Reno, Nevada, U.S.	
2	Win	2–0	(Mexico) Mario Cruz	TKO	4 (4)	Apr 24, 2010	Centro de Usos Múltiples, Ciudad Obregón, Mexico	
1	Win	1–0	(United States) Daniel Calzada	UD	4	Mar 12, 2010	(United States) Gaylord Texan, Grapevine, Texas, U.S.	

== See also ==
- List of WBC world champions
- List of Mexican boxing world champions

Sporting positions
World boxing titles
Preceded by Takashi Miura	WBC Super Featherweight Champion; November 21, 2015 – January 28, 2017	Succeeded by Miguel Berchelt
Awards
Previous: Lucas Matthysse vs John Molina Jr.	BWAA Fight of the Year; The Ring Fight of the Year vs Takashi Miura; 2015	Next: Anthony Joshua vs. Wladimir Klitschko
Previous: Lucas Matthysse vs John Molina Jr.	BWAA Fight of the Year; The Ring Fight of the Year vs Orlando Salido; 2016	Next: Anthony Joshua vs. Wladimir Klitschko
Previous: Francisco Rodríguez Jr. vs Katsunari Takayama	ESPN Fight of the Year vs Takashi Miura; 2015	Next: Anthony Joshua vs. Wladimir Klitschko
Previous: Francisco Rodríguez Jr. vs Katsunari Takayama	ESPN Fight of the Year vs Orlando Salido; 2016	Next: Anthony Joshua vs. Wladimir Klitschko
