= Rod Salka =

American boxer

Personal information
- Nickname: Lightning Rod
- Nationality: American
- Born: February 28, 1983 (age 43) Bunola, Pennsylvania, U.S.
- Height: 5 ft 7 in (170 cm)
- Weight: Super featherweight; Lightweight; Light welterweight

Boxing career
- Reach: 67 1/2 in (171 cm)
- Stance: Orthodox

Boxing record
- Total fights: 30
- Wins: 24
- Win by KO: 4
- Losses: 6

Rod Salka (born February 28, 1983) is an American professional boxer and politician.

== Background ==
Born and raised in Bunola, Pennsylvania, Salka served ten years as part of the United States National Guard, joining in 2001. In 2016, he ran as a Republican in the 38th House District of Pennsylvania.

== Professional career ==
=== Salka vs. García ===
Salka is most notable for facing light welterweight world champion Danny García on August 9, 2014, a fight in which Salka was brutally knocked out in two rounds. Before and after the event, the fight was heavily criticized by boxing observers as a mismatch.

=== Salka vs. Vargas ===
On April 12, 2018, Salka faced former super featherweight world champion Francisco Vargas. During the fight, Salka created controversy by wearing trunks featuring a red, white and blue brick wall pattern and the phrase "America 1st", a reference to Donald Trump's proposed border wall and slogan and policy. Salka would go on to retire on his stool at the end of round six, after being knockdown down by a Vargas combination which left him cut over his left eye.

== Professional boxing record ==
30 fights	24 wins	6 losses
By knockout	4	3
By decision	20	3

No.	Result	Record	Opponent	Type	Round, time	Date	Location	Notes
30	Loss	24–6	Alex Saucedo	KO	1 (8), 2:17	Nov 2, 2019	Dignity Health Sports Park, Carson, California, U.S.	
29	Loss	24–5	Francisco Vargas	RTD	6 (8), 3:00	Apr 12, 2018	Fantasy Springs Resort Casino, Indio, California, U.S.	
28	Win	24–4	Jayro Duran	UD	8	Sep 23, 2017	Convention Center, Monroeville, Pennsylvania, U.S.	
27	Win	23–4	Justin Savi	UD	8	Aug 27, 2016	The Meadows Racetrack and Casino, North Strabane, Pennsylvania, U.S.	
26	Win	22–4	Michal Dufek	UD	8	May 13, 2016	The Fight Company, Pennsylvania, Pittsburgh, Pennsylvania, U.S.	
25	Win	21–4	Noel Echevarria	KO	6 (8), 2:57	May 16, 2015	The Meadows Racetrack and Casino, North Strabane, Pennsylvania, U.S.	Won vacant NABA USA super featherweight title
24	Win	20–4	Monty Meza-Clay	UD	10	Nov 14, 2014	Consol Energy Center, Pittsburgh, Pennsylvania, U.S.	Won vacant WBC FECARBOX lightweight title
23	Loss	19–4	Danny García	KO	2 (10), 2:31	Aug 9, 2014	Barclays Center, New York City, New York, U.S.	
22	Win	19–3	Alexei Collado	UD	10	Apr 18, 2014	Convention Center, Monroeville, Pennsylvania, U.S.	Won vacant WBC FECARBOX lightweight title
21	Loss	18–3	Ricardo Álvarez	MD	10	Dec 14, 2013	Alamodome, San Antonio, Texas, U.S.	For WBC Continental Americas super lightweight title
20	Win	18–2	Ryan Belasco	UD	10	Oct 12, 2013	Green Tree, Pittsburgh, Pennsylvania, U.S.	Retained NABA USA lightweight title; Won vacant IBO International lightweight title
19	Win	17–2	Osnel Charles	UD	8	May 3, 2013	Cal U Convocation Center, California, Pennsylvania, U.S.	
18	Win	16–2	Emmanuel Lucero	TKO	5 (10), 0:55	Feb 2, 2013	Court Time Sports Center, Elizabeth, Pennsylvania, U.S.	Won vacant NABA USA lightweight title
17	Loss	15–2	Dorin Spivey	MD	10	Oct 12, 2012	Tropicana Casino & Resort, Atlantic City, New Jersey, U.S.	For NABA lightweight title
16	Win	15–1	Joseph Laryea	SD	8	Jun 23, 2012	Green Tree, Pittsburgh, Pennsylvania, U.S.	
15	Win	14–1	Angel Rios	UD	8	Apr 7, 2012	Court Time Sports Center, Elizabeth, Pennsylvania, U.S.	
14	Win	13–1	Fernando Rodriguez	UD	6	Nov 17, 2011	Club South, Pittsburgh, Pennsylvania, U.S.	
13	Win	12–1	Gabriel Morris	UD	6	Aug 26, 2011	Court Time Sports Center, Elizabeth, Pennsylvania, U.S.	
12	Loss	11–1	Guillermo Sanchez	UD	8	Nov 24, 2010	Avalon Hotel, Erie, Pennsylvania, U.S.	
11	Win	11–0	Ikem Orji	UD	8	Jun 30, 2010	Heinz Field VIP Tent, Pittsburgh, Pennsylvania, U.S.	
10	Win	10–0	Mario Hayes	UD	6	Jan 22, 2010	Hilton, Pittsburgh, Pennsylvania, U.S.	
9	Win	9–0	Devarise Crayton	UD	6	Sep 30, 2009	Heinz Field VIP Tent, Pittsburgh, Pennsylvania, U.S.	
8	Win	8–0	James Ventry	UD	6	Jun 24, 2009	I.C. Light Amphitheater, Pittsburgh, Pennsylvania, U.S.	
7	Win	7–0	Victor Vasquez	UD	6	Mar 6, 2009	The Blue Horizon, Philadelphia, Pennsylvania, U.S.	
6	Win	6–0	Jose Caraballo	UD	4	May 30, 2008	ExpoMart, Monroeville, Pennsylvania, U.S.	
5	Win	5–0	Ryan Maraldo	UD	4	Apr 5, 2008	Wheeling Island Casino Racetrack, Wheeling, West Virginia, U.S.	
4	Win	4–0	Eric Burke	UD	4	Feb 29, 2008	Days Inn, Butler, Pennsylvania, U.S.	
3	Win	3–0	Shane Gierke	TKO	4 (4), 1:06	Oct 30, 2007	Heinz Field, Pittsburgh, Pennsylvania, U.S.	
2	Win	2–0	Ahmed Poskovic	RTD	3 (4), 3:00	Sep 22, 2007	IceoPlex at Southpointe, Pittsburgh, Pennsylvania, U.S.	
1	Win	1–0	Federico Flores Jr.	MD	4	Jul 21, 2007	Heinz Field South Plaza, Pittsburgh, Pennsylvania, U.S.	

Sporting positions
Regional boxing titles
Vacant Title last held by Luis Ramos Jr.	NABA lightweight champion February 2, 2013 – December 2013; Vacated	Vacant Title next held by Reynaldo Ojeda
Vacant Title last held by Ben Jones	IBO International lightweight champion October 12, 2013 – December 2013; Vacated	Vacant Title next held by Xolisani Ndongeni
Vacant Title last held by Anthony Lora	WBC FECARBOX lightweight champion April 18, 2014 – August 2014; Vacated	Vacant Title next held by Himself
Vacant Title last held by Himself	WBC FECARBOX lightweight champion November 14, 2014 – May 2015; Vacated	Vacant Title next held by Reynaldo Ojeda
Vacant Title last held by Omar Douglas	NABA super featherweight champion May 16, 2015 – February 2016; Vacated	Vacant Title next held by Bekman Soylybayev
