= Miguel Berchelt =

Mexican boxer (born 1991)

Personal information
- Nickname: El Alacrán ("The Scorpion")
- Born: Miguel Ángel Berchelt Cervera; 17 November 1991 (age 34) Cancún, Quintana Roo, Mexico
- Height: 5 ft 7 in (170 cm)
- Weight: Super featherweight Lightweight

Boxing career
- Reach: 71 1/2 in (182 cm)
- Stance: Orthodox

Boxing record
- Total fights: 44
- Wins: 41
- Win by KO: 36
- Losses: 3

Miguel Ángel Berchelt Cervera (born 17 November 1991) is a Mexican professional boxer who held the WBC super featherweight title from 2017 to 2021.

== Amateur career ==
Berchelt tried out at the age of 16 for the football club he supported as a child, Pumas UNAM. He turned to boxing after being rejected. During his amateur career, he was a three-time Mexican National Boxing Champion in the Elite category. Berchelt never represented his country internationally as Óscar Valdez was the highest-ranked boxer in the featherweight division at the time. The two never faced each other as amateurs.

== Professional career ==
=== Early career ===
Berchelt turned pro at the age of 18, moving from his native Cancún to Mérida. He debuted on his 19th birthday, defeating Armin Chan by way of technical knockout in the 2nd round. Berchelt lived in a single room above a gym with six other boxers during this time. He was considered the boxer of the year in 2011 by the World Boxing Council. He amassed a 15–0 record with 13 knockouts before getting his first chance to compete for a belt in September 2012. Berchelt defeated Berman Sánchez for the WBC Youth Intercontinental super featherweight by technical knockout after 2 rounds. Berchelt made his US debut in March 2013 beating Claudio Ríos by TKO in the first round in the undercard of Ríos-Alvarado II at the Mandalay Bay. Berchelt's career suffered a setback when he was knocked out in the first round by Luis Eduardo Florez. Berchelt struggled getting inside the range of his taller opponent. He was knocked down by a left hook and struggled to beat the count before the referee waved the fight off.

However, Berchelt would get his career back on track by rattling off seven consecutive wins by way of knockout and winning the NABO super featherweight title. Berchelt first fought for a world title by facing George Jupp for the vacant interim WBO super featherweight. Berchelt won the title, defeating Jupp with a round 6 TKO in Mérida, his adopted hometown. Jupp was outmatched, having taken the fight at seven days' notice. Berchelt defended his title against Chonlatarn Piriyapinyo before vacating it to challenge WBC champion Francisco Vargas.

=== WBC super featherweight champion ===
==== Berchelt vs. Vargas ====
On 2 December 2016 it was announced that Berchelt and Vargas would meet on 29 January 2017 at the Fantasy Springs Casino in Indio, California for the Vargas' WBC super featherweight title. Vargas and Berchelt traded punches in the early rounds, with cuts from Vargas' previous fights with Takashi Miura and Orlando Salido re-opening. On the latter rounds, Vargas started to slowly fade and Berchelt started to dominate the defending champion. The referee stopped the fight with 2:19 minutes elapsed in the round 11. According to CompuBox Stats, Vargas landed 330 of 1032 punches thrown (32%) and Berchelt landed 430 of his 947 thrown (45%). In the post fight interview, Berchelt said, "I wanted to fight the best of the best, and this fight happened because of that. Francisco is a great champion, he has fought the best and has been in two Fight of the Year contests. I knew what I was getting into I left my heart and soul on the mat. I am young and hungry. I want to thank Vargas for this incredible opportunity." Vargas stated he lost the fight due to cuts and would eventually want a rematch. The fight averaged 497,000 viewers and peaked at 561,000 viewers.

==== Initial defences ====
Berchelt's first defense came on 15 July at The Forum in Inglewood, California against former WBC super featherweight champion Takashi Miura. Miura lost his title to Vargas in The Ring's 2015 Fight of the year. Miura had defeated Miguel Román in the Vargas vs. Berchelt undercard to become the WBC's mandatory challenger. Berchelt knocked down Miura in the first round and proceeded to out-point the former champion en route to a comfortable win by unanimous decision (120–109, 119–108, 116–111). This fight marked only the third time that a Berchelt bout went to the scorecards. Miura announced his retirement 2 weeks after this bout.

In October 2017, it was announced that Berchelt would close out the year by defending his title against Orlando Salido. On 14 October, Sean Gibbons, Salido's manager, told the LA Times that the fight had been finalized to take place on 9 December, meaning it would fall on the same day as Vasiliy Lomachenko vs. Guillermo Rigondeaux. On 23 October, sources indicated that Berchelt was still having issues with his right hand and would not be able to fight. Berchelt was informed by the WBC that he would be allowed a voluntary defence before fighting the winner of Salido vs. Roman.

On 23 January 2018 a deal was finalized for Berchelt to defend his WBC title against 31 year old Philippine boxer Carlo Magali (29–9–3, 12 KOs) on 10 February in Cancún, Mexico. Berchelt had not fought in front of his home fans since July 2011. Originally, Cristian Mijares was scheduled to challenge Berchelt, however a deal could not be reached. A week before the fight, Magali was replaced by African boxer Maxwell Awuku (44–3–1, 30 KOs). Berchelt dropped Awuku twice, winning the bout via TKO in round 3. The referee stopped the bout with 14 seconds remaining in the round. The first knockdown occurred following a straight right and then the second knockdown, which followed after Awuku beat the count, was from a hard jab. The fight was then stopped with Awuku pinned against the ropes receiving power shots. The fight, which aired on TV Azteca in Mexico, was watched by 6 million viewers.

==== Berchelt vs. Barros ====
A couple days after defeating Awuku, it was reported that Berchelt would next fight his mandatory challenger Miguel Román (59–12, 46 KOs) in May 2018. Roman's promoter Osvaldo Küchle was willing to go to purse bids. He revealed Zanfer Promotions made an offer, however it was not satisfactory. Küchle wanted to take the fight to a football stadium. On 19 March, Zanfer Promotions announced that Berchelt would make a voluntary defence in Mérida, before fighting Román later in the year. Argentine boxer and former featherweight world champion Jonathan Victor Barros (41–5–1, 22 KOs) became the front runner to challenge Berchelt on 23 June 2018. The deal was confirmed on 25 May for the fight to take place at the Poliforum Zamna with ESPN+ covering the fight in the United States. Barros was coming off a loss entering this bout following his failed world title challenge against then-IBF champion Lee Selby in July 2017 and at the time ranked #9 at featherweight by the WBC. n an easy title defense, Berchelt defeated Barros via TKO in round 3, successfully retaining his WBC title a third time. Berchelt dropped Barros in round 2 with a left hand to the head. Barros beat the count, however spent the remainder of the bout taking heavy shots. He was dropped again in round 3. Barros' trainer stepped up on the apron advising the referee to stop the bout. Despite Barros beating the count again and wanting to continue, the referee stopped the fight 1:53 of round 3. On the same night, mandatory challenger Miguel Román (60–12, 47 KOs) defeated then-undefeated Michel Marcano via stoppage in round 2. Prior to their respective bouts, the WBC ordered Berchelt vs. Roman to take place.

==== Berchelt vs. Román ====
Whilst a deal was being finalized for the Berchelt vs. Miguel Román (60–12, 47 KOs) fight, it was said that HBO, who had showcased both boxers recent fights, would likely not broadcast the fight as there was interest from Showtime, ESPN+ and DAZN. On 24 August it was announced that ESPN+ had picked up the fight, to take place on 3 November 2018 in either Los Angeles or Texas. The Don Haskins Center in El Paso, Texas was later confirmed as the venue. Román became the mandatory after defeating Orlando Salido in December 2017. For the fight, Román trained with Rudy Hernandez and revealed they were doing high level sparring aiming to stop Berchelt. Both weighed under the limit at 129.6 pounds. Heading into the fight, despite promoting neither boxer, Bob Arum said the fight would be a candidate for ‘Fight of the Year.’ The fight was Román 's third attempt at winning a world title. The previous two attempts were unsuccessful at lower weights.

The fight delivered as expected, in front of 5,420 fans, as Berchelt made a successful fourth defence scoring a 9th-round TKO win against Román after dropping him twice. The boxers fought a phonebooth style for the first five rounds. Both trading shots in the inside. The first knockdown came in round 6 following a right hand. Román did well to just beat the count and was dropped again as the round ended after Berchelt applied constant pressure. The fight became one-sided after round 6 with Berchelt continuing to land shots. Referee Jon Schorle saw enough and decided to halt the fight with only 2 seconds remaining in round 9, giving Berchelt the win. Berchelt credited Román for his bravery and said the fight was his toughest title defence.

==== Berchelt vs. Vargas II ====
Berchelt was scheduled to face the former WBC super featherweight champion Francisco Vargas in his fifth title defense. Vargas was ranked #1 by the WBC at super featherweight. The bout was a rematch of their 28 January 2017 meeting, which Berchelt won by an eleventh-round knockout. The rematch was scheduled for 11 May 2019, for the undercard of the Emanuel Navarrete and Isaac Dogboe II WBO super bantamweight title bout. The card was broadcast by ESPN and took place at the Tucson Convention Center in Arizona. Berchelt justified his role as the betting favorite, as he won the fight by a sixth-round stoppage. He dominated the bout from the opening bell, with Vargas finding no success, which prompted his corner to retire their fighter at the end of the sixth round. Berchelt out-landed Vargas almost 2-to-1, landing 293 total punches to Vargas' 142.

==== Berchelt vs. Sosa ====
Berchelt was booked to make his sixth title defense against the former WBA (Regular) super featherweight champion Jason Sosa (2–-3–4, 16 KOs). Sosa was ranked #4 by the WBC and #15 by the IBF at super featherweight. The title bout was scheduled as the main event of an ESPN broadcast card, which took place on 2 November 2019 at the Dignity Health Sports Park in Carson, California. Berchelt entered the fight as the favorite to retain the title, with most odds-makers having him at -5000, while Sosa entered the fight as a +1400 underdog. To help prepare for the fight, Berchelt sparred with Jesús Quijada, Daniel Lugo, Bryan Acosta and Pedro Campa. Having lost two consecutive fights in 2017, Sosa picked up 3 wins, against fringe level contenders to put him back into title contention. When asked who he would like to fight after Sosa, Berchelt said he wanted Óscar Valdez amongst other big names. Both boxers weighed under the limit. Berchelt came in at 129.8 pounds and Sosa was 128.2 pounds.

Berchelt won the fight by a fourth-round TKO. Berchelt knocked Sosa down in round 2 with a barrage of punches and kept the pressure coming, ultimately forcing a corner stoppage with four seconds left in round 4. After Sosa beat the count in round 2, rather than over up, he began trading with Berchelt, which only resulted in Berchelt dominating what was left of the round. In round 4, Berchelt landed a combination to the head and a left hook to the body, which dropped Sosa a second time. Sosa got up at the count of 9 only to be pinned to the ropes and peppered Sosa with shots. It was at this point Sosa's corner had seen enough and threw in the towel. During the post-fight interviews, Berchelt said, “It was an excellent fight tonight. I respect Jason. He’s a great fighter. He came to fight and I have a lot of love for him.” Berchelt out-landed Sosa 3-to-1 in total punches (122 to 43) and 4-to-1 in power punches landed (116 to 30). Berchelt said he wanted Valdez next. Valdez was scheduled to make his super featherweight debut on November 30, against Andrés Gutierrez.

==== Berchelt vs. Valenzuela ====
Whilst waiting on the COVID restrictions which meant sporting events were being cancelled worldwide, Berchelt was hoping to stay busy. Zanfer Promotions were looking to put on a card in Mexico without any fan on 6 June. Berchelt was already in training camp and keeping in shape. On 17 June, Zanfer Promotions confirmed a card to take place at TV Azteca Studios in Mexico with Berchelt headlining in a non-title bout. His was opponent was announced to be Eleazar Valenzuela (21–13–4, 16 KOs), who was 8–3 with one no contest in his last 12 bouts. Berchelt weighed a career-heavy 135 pounds for the fight, with Valenzuela coming in at 135.5 pounds for the fight. It was reported that Berchelt would take a lower pay for the stay-busy fight, which he was not concerned with, as long as it meant he would get to fight. Berchelt said he was told when offered the opportunity, that he would not get his usual purses he had been getting fighting in United States arenas, to with he replied, "that does not matter to me.” The fight was televised on ESPN. As expected, Berchelt defeated Valenzuela inside the distance. The stoppage came in round 6. Berchelt worked his jab in the opening rounds. Berchelt was the clear aggressor and continued to land combinations from the second round. Berchelt was hit with the low blow in round 3. It was expected Valenzuela did this to slow down the tempo. Round four and five continued the same way, as Berchelt got the rounds in before a jab followed by a 3-punch combination or two rights and a left hook sent Valenzuela into ropes. This followed by some unanswered power shots to the head, forcing the fight to be stopped. Berchelt landed 232 of his 478 total punches (49%), a staggering 201 of them being power punches, with a connect rate of 63%. Valenzuela only landed 37 of his 305 punches thrown (12%). The whole card averaged 416,000 viewers, peaking at 793,000 viewers.

==== Berchelt vs. Valdez ====
On 25 September 2020, it was revealed that Berchelt would make his seventh title defense against the undefeated former WBO featherweight champion Óscar Valdez (28–0, 22 KOs) on 12 December in Las Vegas. Valdez was the mandatory challenger for Berchelt, as he had vacated the featherweight title in order to move up and challenge the reigning WBC super featherweight champion. Valdez was ranked #1 by the WBC and #2 by the WBO at super featherweight.

Although it was never officially announced, the fight was postponed on 4 November, as Berchelt had tested positive for COVID-19. A month later, Berchelt was testing negative for COVID and back in training. During that time, 23 year old Shakur Stevenson (14–0, 8 KOs) said he would step in for Berchelt, but doubted Valdez and his team would accept the fight. Valdez hit back with the claims and said he was not ducking anyone, claiming the Berchelt fight was much tougher for him than fighting Stevenson. Stevenson also accused Valdez of ducking him in June 2020 as well. On 6 January 2021, the bout was rescheduled for 20 February headlining a ESPN card, to took place at the MGM Grand Conference Center in Paradise, Nevada. Berchelt stated it was a dream fight for him, one he had looked forward to since amateur days. Berchelt was the favorite heading into the fight and entering on a 17-fight win streak.

On fight week, Berchelt arrived in Las Vegas, but without his trainer Alfredo Caballero due to a visa discrepancy. Berchelt and his team were confident the issue would be resolved. They were in communication with the U.S. immigration officials. Within a day, at the final press conference, Berchelt said the issue was resolved and he would have his full team behind him. Both boxers came in at the weight limit of 130 pounds. There was some significance on the day of the weigh in, as it was 21 years to the date from Marco Antonio Barrera and Erik Morales first meeting of their epic rivalry, which was also an all-Mexican fight. Veteran Russell Mora was named as the referee for the contest.

Berchelt lost the fight by a tenth-round TKO. Valdez used his skill and speed advantage, managed to wear down Berchelt and knock him down in rounds nine and ten. Valdez was the better boxer from the start. In round 4, Valdez caused Berchelt to stumble into the ropes after a left hook to the head. Referee Mora called a knockdown in favour of Valdez, due to the ropes holding Berchelt up. Berchelt did not recover and took some further punishment in round 5. Valdez was tired between rounds six to eight, but used his skill in countering Berchelt. Valdez came out in round 9 rejuvenated and dropped Berchelt again. The ending came with Valdez knocking Berchelt out cold with a left-hand shot that caused him to fall over face first on the canvas. The fight was immediately called off. Berchelt was then put on his back for several minutes before being helped sit up. Valdez was leading on the scorecards at the time of the stoppage, with scores of 89–80, 88–81 and 87–82, which was from Max DeLuca who scored the first 3 rounds for Berchelt. Valdez was happy with the win, calling it his biggest win of his career, and went on to call out Stevenson. Valdez's trainer, Eddy Reynoso, who was also well known for being the trainer of pound-for-pound star Canelo Álvarez, said the fight was the proudest moment of his career.

According to Compubox, Berchelt landed 99 of his 447 punches thrown (22.1%) and Valdez, who was constantly the more busier fighter, landed 149 of his 534 punches thrown (27.9%). Valdez outlanded Berchelt in 8 of the 10 rounds. Berchelt was taken to hospital following the fight, held for observation and released the next day. He was allowed to go back to his hotel after a CT scan showed no concerns.

Nielsen Media Research reported an average audience of 895,000 for the fight, and peak viewership at 960,000, which was during the main event. The number was likely to surpass 1 million viewers, as the fight was also shown on the ESPN+ app, which Nielsen do not report viewership number for.

=== Move to lightweight ===
On 6 March 2021, Berchelt revealed that he would likely move up in weigh to the lightweight division. He gave no excuses in his stoppage loss to Valdez and gave him full credit for his performance. He felt he was always in the fight and urged his trainer Alfredo Caballero to not stop the fight. The plan was to move up lightweight for a return bout, to then move back down in weight to super featherweight to challenge Valdez in a rematch. On 1 November, Bob Arum spoke to reporters after Shakur Stevenson became a 2-weight world champion, stating he would like Berchelt to challenge Stevenson next. The other fight he wanted to make was Valdez against WBO featherweight champion, Emanuel Navarrete, with the winners or both bouts to fight each other.

Also in November, Berchelt had parted ways with trainer Caballero after working together for over four years. Berchelt said he would now train in Las Vegas. He was seen training with Jorge Capetillo in Las Vegas and with Jorge Rubio in Miami. In January 2022, Berchelt announced his intentions of moving up to lightweight.

==== Berchelt vs. Nakathila ====
A month later, on 7 February, it was revealed that Berchelt would face the one-time WBO interim super featherweight title challenger Jeremiah Nakathila, who was also making his lightweight debut. The bout headlined an ESPN card on 26 March 2022, thirteen months after his loss to Valdez. The fight also marked only the third time in his professional career that Nakathila would fight outside of South Africa. The card was officially announced on 2 March to take place at the Resorts World Events Center at Resorts World Las Vegas. The main event was scheduled for 10 rounds. The event was the first to take place at the resort, which opened in June 2021. Ahead of the fight, Berchelt said, “I am ready to turn the page and show the fans I have what it takes to become a two-division world champion. The Valdez fight is in the past, and my focus is on Nakathila and a lightweight world title in 2022. ‘El Alacran’ is back, and I can't wait to come to Resorts World Las Vegas to put on a show.” Berchelt was a heavy 6-1 favorite favourite. He weighed on the 135 pound limit while Nakathila came in lighter at 133.6 pounds.

Berchelt retired from the fight at the end of the sixth round. He was knocked down with a jab in the third round and badly staggered near the end of the sixth round, after which his corner opted to withdraw their fighter from the contest. Berchelt showed a glimmer of hope of a comeback in round 5, only for Nakathila to take back control. After the fight, Berchelt said through a translator, "I'm going to get up; I'm going to rise from this. The great champions are not the ones who fall. The great champions are those who rise, and I will go home, spend time with my family, visit with them, get some rest and I am going to come back stronger than ever." Berchelt felt he could continue when the fight was stopped, but ultimately respected referee Russell Mora's decision, who had been advised by the ringside physicians. Berchelt landed less total punches (80 to 125) and power punches (27 to 78) than Nakathila, and was down 60–53 on all three of the judges' scorecards.

==== Back to winning ways ====
On 27 September 2023, Golden Boy Promotions announced a Fight Night on DAZN: Mexico Edition card to take place at the Poliforum Zamna in Mérida, Mexico on October 14, in co-promotion with Zanfer Promotions. With the announcement, it was revealed Berchelt would headline the card against Argentine boxer Diego “El Profeta” Ruiz (24–7–1, 12 KOs) in a 10-round lightweight fight. Ruiz was 1–4–1 in his last six fights heading into this bout and fought more recently at featherweight. He was best known for fighting in the UK, having upset Gamal Yafai over 10 rounds in February 2023 and splitting a draw with prospect Lee McGregor in February 2022. Berchelt won the fight via corner retirement at the end of round 2, picking up his first win in three years. Berchelt dominated the action in both rounds. Ruiz then cited an injury to his right hand, failing to come out for round 3.

Berchelt's next fight was scheduled to take place in Tlaxcala against Colombian boxer Jeremy Triana (15–5–3, 13 KO) for the Fecarbox lightweight title in a 10-round bout on 27 July 2024. He dominated the fight using his jab in round 1. Berchelt worked the body in round 2, but was on the receiving end of an uppercut. In round 3, Berchelt again hurt Triana to the body. The referee temporarily paused the action to call on the ringside doctor to check the cut above Triana's eye. He was cleared to return to action, but the end was near as Berchelt stepped up the pace and landed some unanswered punches, causing the referee to stop the fight. Berchelt was credited with a 3rd round stoppage win.

On 9 November 2024, Fernando Beltrán of Zanfer Promotions announced that Berchelt would fight 27 year old Argentina southpaw Mauro Hasan (16–9–1, 8 KOs) on 30 November at Yucatán Fair in Xmatkuil, which served as the location of Berchelt's debut in 2010. The fight took place at the lightweight division and the venue was the Plaza de Toros La Esperanza. For the first time in seven years, Berchelt was taken the distance, winning a unanimous decision. The judges scorecards read, 98–90, and 97–91 twice in Berchelt's favour. The scorecards suggested a dominant fight, however was closely contested until round 7 when Berchelt landed a left hook, dropping Hasan. He beat the count, but remained on unsteady legs. Hasan was deducted a point in the following round for spitting his mouthpiece out. The referee had already warned him earlier in the fight. Berchelt tried to get a stoppage win, but Hasan stayed on his feet. The win put Berchelt on three back-to-back wins, in an attempt to get back into world title contention.

Berchelt's next fight took place on 11 October 2025 against Venezuelan boxer Edixon Perez (30–13–1, 24 KOs) on a TV Azteca card in Reynosa, Mexico. The bout was scheduled doe 10-rounds. Perez had previously competed in Mexico on three occasions, without securing a victory in any of those fights. Berchelt defeated Perez via stoppage to secure his fourth consecutive win and further gain momentum heading into 2026, in search for bigger fights. He dominated the first seven rounds. The fight ended when Perez did not come out for round 8. Before the fight, Berchelt stated his desire to fight against top lightweights again.

On 10 July 2026, it was announced that Berchelt would make a return to the ring against Colombian contender Juan Manuel Cordoba (7–1, 4 KOs) at the Centro de Usos Multiples in Hermosillo, Mexico. The event was set to be broadcast live on YouTube and part of the "Noche Suprema" series. Upon the announcement, he said, "I am very motivated to fight in Hermosillo, my hometown for the last 15 years. I want to show all my fans that there is [more] 'Alacran' Berchelt [to come] for many years."

== Professional boxing record ==
| 45 fights | 42 wins | 3 losses |
|---|---|---|
| By knockout | 37 | 3 |
| By decision | 4 | 0 |
| By disqualification | 1 | 0 |

| No. | Result | Record | Opponent | Type | Round | Date | Location | Notes |
|---|---|---|---|---|---|---|---|---|
| 45 | Win | 42–3 | (Venezuela) Edixon Perez | RTD | 7 (10), 3:00 | 11 Oct 2025 | Gimnasio UAT, Reynosa, Mexico | |
| 44 | Win | 41–3 | (Argentina) Mauro Alex Hasan Perouene | UD | 10 | 30 Nov 2024 | Merida, Yucatán, Mexico | |
| 43 | Win | 40–3 | (Colombia) Jeremy Triana | TKO | 3 (10), 2:36 | 27 Jul 2024 | Tlaxcala, Mexico | |
| 42 | Win | 39–3 | (Argentina) Diego Alberto Ruiz | RTD | 2 (10), 3:00 | 14 Oct 2023 | Polyforum Zam Ná, Merida, Mexico | |
| 41 | Loss | 38–3 | (Namibia) Jeremiah Nakathila | RTD | 6 (10), 3:00 | 26 Mar 2022 | (United States) Resorts World Las Vegas, Winchester, Nevada, U.S. | |
| 40 | Loss | 38–2 | (Mexico) Óscar Valdez | KO | 10 (12), 2:59 | 20 Feb 2021 | (United States) MGM Grand Conference Center, Paradise, Nevada, U.S. | Lost WBC super featherweight title |
| 39 | Win | 38–1 | (Mexico) Eleazer Valenzuela | TKO | 6 (10), 1:13 | 27 Jun 2020 | Gimnasio TV Azteca, Mexico City, Mexico | |
| 38 | Win | 37–1 | (United States) Jason Sosa | KO | 4 (12), 2:56 | 2 Nov 2019 | (United States) Dignity Health Sports Park, Carson, California, U.S. | Retained WBC super featherweight title |
| 37 | Win | 36–1 | (Mexico) Francisco Vargas | RTD | 6 (12), 3:00 | 11 May 2019 | (United States) Convention Center, Tucson, Arizona, U.S. | Retained WBC super featherweight title |
| 36 | Win | 35–1 | (Mexico) Miguel Román | TKO | 9 (12), 2:58 | 3 Nov 2018 | (United States) Don Haskins Center, El Paso, Texas, U.S. | Retained WBC super featherweight title |
| 35 | Win | 34–1 | (Argentina) Jonathan Victor Barros | TKO | 3 (12), 1:53 | 23 Jun 2018 | (Mexico) Poliforum Zamna, Mérida, México | Retained WBC super featherweight title |
| 34 | Win | 33–1 | (Ghana) Maxwell Awuku | TKO | 3 (12), 2:46 | 10 Feb 2018 | (Mexico) Grand Oasis Resort, Cancún, México | Retained WBC super featherweight title |
| 33 | Win | 32–1 | (Japan) Takashi Miura | UD | 12 | 15 Jul 2017 | (United States) The Forum, Inglewood, California, U.S. | Retained WBC super featherweight title |
| 32 | Win | 31–1 | (Mexico) Francisco Vargas | KO | 11 (12), 2:19 | 28 Jan 2017 | (United States) Fantasy Springs Casino, Indio, California, U.S. | Won WBC super featherweight title |
| 31 | Win | 30–1 | (Thailand) Chonlatarn Piriyapinyo | KO | 4 (12), 2:59 | 16 Jul 2016 | (Mexico) Polideportivo Soraya Jiménez, Los Reyes La Paz, México | Retained WBO interim super featherweight title |
| 30 | Win | 29–1 | (United Kingdom) George Jupp | KO | 6 (12), 1:55 | 12 Mar 2016 | (Mexico) Poliforum Zamna, Mérida, México | Won WBO interim super featherweight title |
| 29 | Win | 28–1 | (Panama) Rolando Giono | KO | 3 (10), 1:50 | 19 Dec 2015 | (Mexico) Coliseo Yucatán, Mérida, México | |
| 28 | Win | 27–1 | (Nicaragua) Josué Bendana | TKO | 5 (10), 1:34 | 26 Sep 2015 | (Mexico) Centro Convenciones, Puerto Peñasco, México | |
| 27 | Win | 26–1 | (Mexico) Sergio Puente | RTD | 5 (10), 3:00 | 20 Jun 2015 | (Mexico) Palenque, Comitán, México | |
| 26 | Win | 25–1 | (Nicaragua) René González | RTD | 5 (12), 3:00 | 28 Mar 2015 | (Mexico) Poliforum Zamna, Mérida, México | Won vacant NABO super featherweight title |
| 25 | Win | 24–1 | (Mexico) Antonio Escalante | TKO | 3 (10), 2:36 | 11 Oct 2014 | (Mexico) Coliseo Yucatán, Mérida, México | |
| 24 | Win | 23–1 | (Dominican Republic) Carlos Manuel Reyes | KO | 4 (10), 2:54 | 5 Jul 2014 | (Mexico) La Inalámbrica, Mérida, México | |
| 23 | Win | 22–1 | (Mexico) Armando Mariscal | KO | 3 (10), 2:28 | 31 May 2014 | (Mexico) La Inalámbrica, Mérida, México | |
| 22 | Loss | 21–1 | (Colombia) Luis Eduardo Florez | TKO | 1 (10), 1:39 | 15 Mar 2014 | (Mexico) Palenque, México | |
| 21 | Win | 21–0 | (Mexico) Omar Estrella | KO | 5 (10), 2:51 | 2 Nov 2013 | (Mexico) Centro de Usos Múltiples, Hermosillo, México | |
| 20 | Win | 20–0 | (Mexico) Cristóbal Cruz | TKO | 5 (10), 2:25 | 31 Aug 2013 | (Mexico) La Inalámbrica, Mérida, México | |
| 19 | Win | 19–0 | (Philippines) Weng Haya | TKO | 2 (10), 2:57 | 22 Jun 2013 | (Mexico) La Inalámbrica, Mérida, México | |
| 18 | Win | 18–0 | (Puerto Rico) Carlos Claudio | TKO | 1 (8), 1:58 | 30 Mar 2013 | (United States) Mandalay Bay Events Center, Paradise, Nevada, U.S. | |
| 17 | Win | 17–0 | (Nicaragua) Oliver Flores | KO | 2 (10), 2:49 | 9 Nov 2012 | (Mexico) La Inalámbrica, Mérida, México | Retained WBC Youth Intercontinental super featherweight title |
| 16 | Win | 16–0 | (Nicaragua) Berman Sánchez | TKO | 2 (10), 0:57 | 7 Sep 2012 | (Mexico) La Inalámbrica, Mérida, México | Won vacant WBC Youth Intercontinental super featherweight title |
| 15 | Win | 15–0 | (Mexico) Sergio López | TKO | 1 (10), 1:39 | 6 Jul 2012 | (Mexico) Unidad Deportiva Víctor Cervera, Mérida, México | |
| 14 | Win | 14–0 | (Mexico) Carlos Ocampo | UD | 10 | 19 May 2012 | (Mexico) Arena TKT, Puerto Vallarta, México | |
| 13 | Win | 13–0 | (Mexico) Albert Chuc | TKO | 1 (8), 1:16 | 31 Mar 2012 | (Mexico) Poliforum Zamna, Mérida, México | |
| 12 | Win | 12–0 | (Mexico) Fernando Cruz | KO | 3 (8), 2:50 | 17 Dec 2011 | (Mexico) Arena Jorge Cuesy Serrano, Tuxtla Gutiérrez, México | |
| 11 | Win | 11–0 | (Mexico) Cristian Palafox | UD | 6 | 26 Nov 2011 | (Mexico) Feria de Xmatkuil, Mérida, México | |
| 10 | Win | 10–0 | (Mexico) Pablo Batres | TKO | 5 (6), 1:15 | 29 Oct 2011 | (Mexico) Centro de Usos Múltiples, Hermosillo, México | |
| 9 | Win | 9–0 | (Mexico) Miguel Ángel Chi | DQ | 5 (6), 2:17 | 10 Sep 2011 | (Mexico) Centro de Convenciones Siglo XXI, Mérida, México | |
| 8 | Win | 8–0 | (Mexico) Israel Barrón | TKO | 2 (6), 0:18 | 20 Aug 2011 | (Mexico) Valle de Guadalupe, México | |
| 7 | Win | 7–0 | (Mexico) Ricardo Hernández | TKO | 2 (6), 2:07 | 26 Jul 2011 | (Mexico) Plaza de Toros, Cancún, México | |
| 6 | Win | 6–0 | (Mexico) Freddy Hernández | TKO | 2 (6), 1:39 | 11 Jun 2011 | (Mexico) La Inalámbrica, Mérida, México | |
| 5 | Win | 5–0 | (Mexico) Alfredo de los Santos | TKO | 3 (6), 1:16 | 2 Apr 2011 | (Mexico) Auditorio del Estado, Mexicali, México | |
| 4 | Win | 4–0 | (Mexico) Aaron López | TKO | 1 (4), 2:30 | 2 Feb 2011 | (Mexico) Plaza de Toros, Mérida, México | |
| 3 | Win | 3–0 | (Mexico) Jonathan Quime | TKO | 3 (4), 2:57 | 18 Dec 2010 | (Mexico) Estadio 20 de Noviembre, Campeche, México | |
| 2 | Win | 2–0 | (Mexico) Eduardo Arévalo | TKO | 1 (4), 0:52 | 27 Nov 2010 | (Mexico) Feria de Xmatkuil, Mérida, México | |
| 1 | Win | 1–0 | (Mexico) Armin Chan | TKO | 1 (4), 1:26 | 17 Nov 2010 | (Mexico) Feria de Xmatkuil, Mérida, México | |

== See also ==
- List of world super-featherweight boxing champions
- List of Mexican boxing world champions

Sporting positions
World boxing titles
| Vacant Title last held by Orlando Salido | WBO super featherweight champion Interim title 12 March 2016 – November 2016; Stripped | Vacant Title next held by Shakur Stevenson |
| Preceded by Francisco Vargas | WBC super featherweight champion 28 January 2017 - 20 February 2021 | Succeeded by Óscar Valdez |
