= Takashi Miura =

Japanese boxer (born 1984)

Personal information
- Nickname: Bomber Left
- Nationality: Japanese
- Born: 14 May 1984 (age 42) Mitane, Yamamoto District, Akita
- Height: 1.70 m (5 ft 7 in)
- Weight: Super featherweight

Boxing career
- Stance: Southpaw

Boxing record
- Total fights: 37
- Wins: 31
- Win by KO: 24
- Losses: 4
- Draws: 2

Takashi Miura (三浦 隆司, Miura Takeshi; born 14 May 1984) is a Japanese former professional boxer who competed from 2003 to 2017. a former WBC Super featherweight Champion. He was born in the Akita Prefecture and lives in Tokyo.

== Professional career ==
=== Miura vs. Diaz ===
Miura won the WBC super featherweight title from Mexican Gamaliel Díaz via a ninth-round TKO in the latter's first title defence in Tokyo at the Kokugikan on April 8, 2013.

=== Miura vs. Vargas ===
He made four title defences before losing his belt in 2015 to Francisco Vargas, in a potential fight of the year candidate.

=== Miura vs. Roman ===
On January 28, 2017, Miura knocked out Miguel Roman, ranked #2 by the WBC and #6 by the WBA at super featherweight, in the 12th round of their fight to earn a second shot at the WBC Super featherweight title, was held by Miguel Berchelt who defeated Vargas for the belt later that same evening.

=== Miura vs. Berchelt ===
On July 15, 2017, Miura challenged Miguel Berchelt for his WBC super featherweight belt. Berchelt won convincingly on all three scorecards, 120–109, 119-108 and 116–111.

== Professional boxing record ==
37 fights	31 wins	4 losses
By knockout	24	2
By decision	7	2
Draws	2	

No.	Result	Record	Opponent	Type	Round	Date	Location	Notes
37	Loss	31–4–2	(Mexico) Miguel Berchelt	UD	12	2017-07-15	(United States) The Forum, Inglewood, California, U.S.	For WBC super-featherweight title
36	Win	31–3–2	(Mexico) Miguel Roman	KO	12 (12), 0:53	2017-01-28	(United States) Fantasy Springs Resort Casino, Indio, California, U.S.	
35	Win	30–3–2	(Philippines) Jimmy Borbon	KO	1 (10), 2:41	2016-05-10	Korakuen Hall, Tokyo, Tokyo, Japan	
34	Loss	29–3–2	(Mexico) Francisco Vargas	TKO	9 (12), 1:31	2015-11-21	(United States) Mandalay Bay Resort & Casino, Las Vegas, Nevada, U.S.	Lost WBC super-featherweight title
33	Win	29–2–2	(Australia) Billy Dib	TKO	3 (12), 1:29	2015-05-01	Ota City General Gymnasium, Tokyo, Japan	Retained WBC super-featherweight title
32	Win	28–2–2	(Mexico) Edgar Puerta	TKO	6 (12), 2:15	2014-11-22	Yokohama International Swimming Pool, Yokohama, Kanagawa, Japan	Retained WBC super-featherweight title
31	Win	27–2–2	(Mexico) Dante Jardón	TKO	9 (12), 0:55	2013-12-31	Ota City General Gymnasium, Tokyo, Japan	Retained WBC super-featherweight title
30	Win	26–2–2	(Mexico) Sergio Thompson	UD	12	2013-08-17	Plaza de Toros, Cancún, Quintana Roo, Mexico	Retained WBC super-featherweight title
29	Win	25–2–2	(Mexico) Gamaliel Díaz	TKO	9 (12), 1:21	2013-04-08	Ryōgoku Kokugikan, Tokyo, Japan	Won WBC super-featherweight title
28	Win	24–2–2	(Japan) Ryuji Migaki	TKO	1 (10), 1:37	2012-10-27	Tokyo International Forum, Tokyo, Japan	
27	Win	23–2–2	(Philippines) Desson Cag-ong	TKO	2 (8), 2:35	2012-06-02	Korakuen Hall, Tokyo, Japan	
26	Win	22–2–2	(Philippines) RJ Ano-os	UD	8	2012-02-04	Korakuen Hall, Tokyo, Japan	
25	Win	21–2–2	(Mexico) Jorge Perez	UD	10	2011-10-18	Korakuen Hall, Tokyo, Japan	
24	Loss	20–2–2	(Japan) Takashi Uchiyama	RTD	8 (12), 3:00	2011-01-31	Ariake Colosseum, Tokyo, Japan	For WBA super-featherweight title
23	Win	20–1–2	(Japan) Takashi Inagaki	TKO	9 (10), 1:21	2010-10-02	Korakuen Hall, Tokyo, Japan	Retained Japanese super-featherweight title
22	Win	19–1–2	(Japan) Hiroto Takeshita	TKO	3 (10), 2:57	2010-06-05	Korakuen Hall, Tokyo, Japan	Retained Japanese super-featherweight title
21	Win	18–1–2	(Japan) Seiichi Okada	SD	10	2010-02-06	Korakuen Hall, Tokyo, Japan	Retained Japanese super-featherweight title
20	Win	17–1–2	(Japan) Masayuki Koguchi	UD	10	2009-10-10	Yoyogi #2 Gymnasium, Tokyo, Japan	Retained Japanese super-featherweight title
19	Win	16–1–2	(Japan) Yoshimitsu Yashiro	TKO	7 (10), 0:30	2009-07-04	Korakuen Hall, Tokyo, Japan	Won Japanese super-featherweight title
18	Draw	15–1–2	(Japan) Yoshimitsu Yashiro	PTS	10	2009-01-17	Korakuen Hall, Tokyo, Japan	For Japanese super-featherweight title
17	Win	15–1–1	(Thailand) Daochai Sithsoei	KO	3 (8), 2:33	2008-10-06	Korakuen Hall, Tokyo, Japan	
16	Win	14–1–1	(Thailand) Insee Sithkawpon 1996	KO	1 (8), 1:37	2008-06-04	Korakuen Hall, Tokyo, Japan	
15	Win	13–1–1	(Thailand) Daorung Sithsoei	KO	2 (8), 1:50	2008-03-03	Korakuen Hall, Tokyo, Japan	
14	Loss	12–1–1	(Japan) Yusuke Kobori	UD	10	2007-09-15	Korakuen Hall, Tokyo, Japan	For Japanese super-featherweight title
13	Win	12–0–1	(Thailand) Mongkolchai Saendeegym	KO	2 (8), 1:05	2007-04-14	Korakuen Hall, Tokyo, Japan	
12	Win	11–0–1	(Thailand) Denlangoo Tor Tiebkoon	UD	8	2006-11-18	Korakuen Hall, Tokyo, Japan	
11	Win	10–0–1	(Japan) Hidekazu Matsunobu	KO	7 (10), 3:05	2006-07-01	Korakuen Hall, Tokyo, Japan	
10	Win	9–0–1	(Japan) Kentaro Ogura	KO	1 (8), 2:50	2006-03-04	Korakuen Hall, Tokyo, Japan	
9	Win	8–0–1	(Thailand) Phongpetch Chuwatana	TKO	1 (8), 1:48	2005-12-07	Korakuen Hall, Tokyo, Japan	
8	Win	7–0–1	(Thailand) Bunchai Kiatpailin	TKO	5 (8), 1:24	2005-09-22	City Gymnasium, Akita City, Akita, Japan	
7	Win	6–0–1	(Thailand) Singsamut Eausampan	TKO	6 (8), 1:55	2005-04-28	Korakuen Hall, Tokyo, Japan	
6	Draw	5–0–1	(Japan) Akinori Suzuki	PTS	8	2004-12-04	Korakuen Hall, Tokyo, Japan	
5	Win	5–0	(Japan) Hideki Tanaka	TKO	3 (8), 2:32	2004-08-07	Korakuen Hall, Tokyo, Japan	
4	Win	4–0	(Thailand) Sardtora Saendeegym	KO	1 (8), 2:55	2004-05-12	Korakuen Hall, Tokyo, Japan	
3	Win	3–0	(Japan) Osamu Nakamura	TKO	3 (8), 2:04	2004-02-26	Korakuen Hall, Tokyo, Japan	
2	Win	2–0	(Thailand) Padejsuek Twingym	KO	1 (6), 2:07	2003-09-09	Korakuen Hall, Tokyo, Japan	
1	Win	1–0	(Japan) Yutaka Sato	UD	6	2003-07-12	Pacifico Yokohama, Yokohama, Kanagawa, Japan	

== See also ==
- List of WBC world champions
- List of super featherweight boxing champions
- List of Japanese boxing world champions
- Boxing in Japan

Achievements
Preceded by Gamaliel Díaz	WBC Super Featherweight Champion; April 8, 2013 – November 21, 2015	Succeeded by Francisco Vargas
