= Jardon =

- Álvaro Jardón (born 1977), Spanish bassist
- Dante Jardón (born 1988), Mexican professional boxer
- Dorothy Jardon (1883–1966), American soprano and actress
- Henri-Antoine Jardon (1768–1809), French general of brigade
