= David Rodela =

American boxer

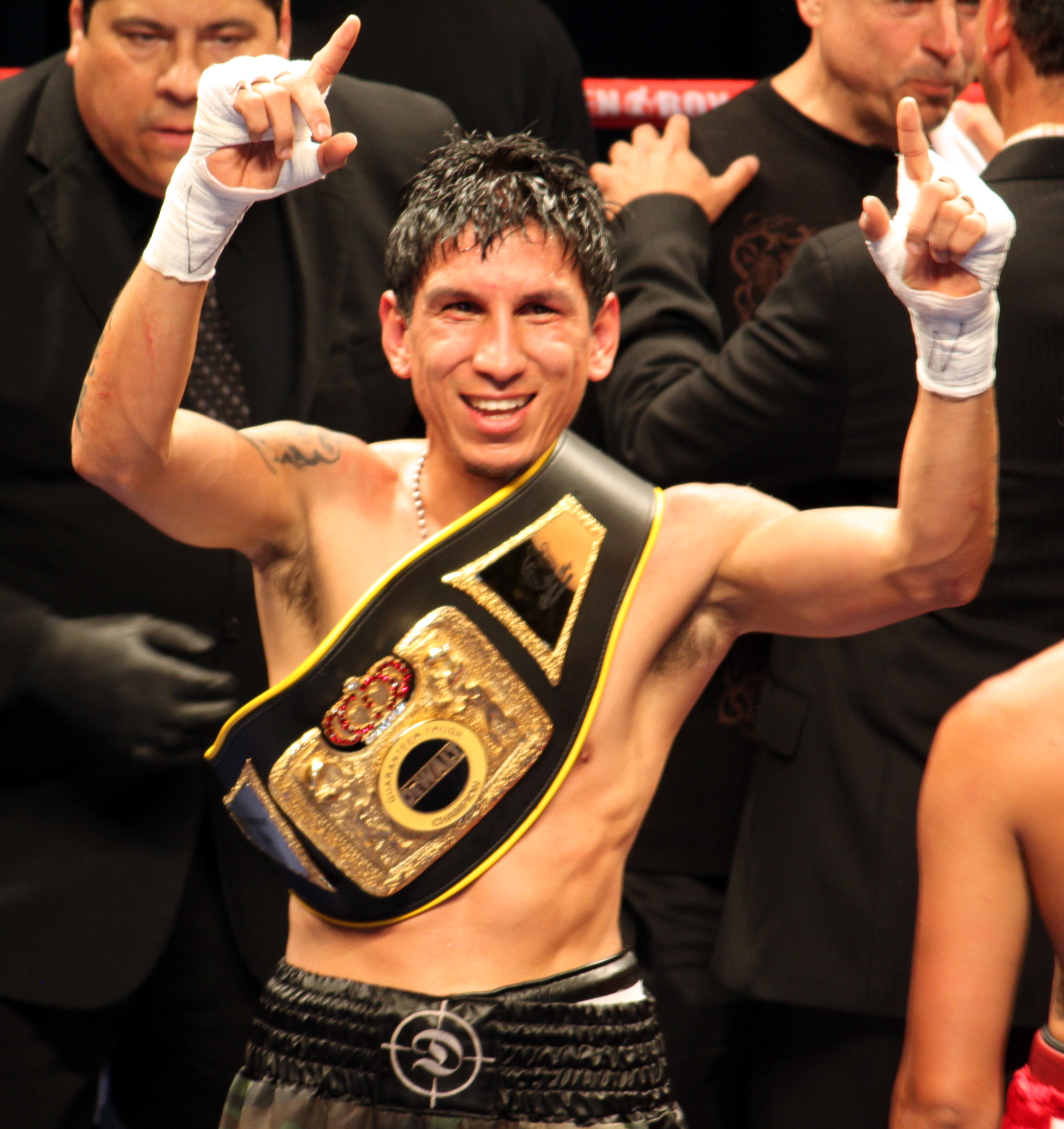
- Rodela in 2010

Personal information
- Nickname: Dangerous
- Born: October 25, 1986 (age 39) Oxnard, California
- Height: 5 ft 11 in (182 cm)
- Weight: Super featherweight

Boxing career
- Reach: 74 in (187 cm)
- Stance: Orthodox

Boxing record
- Total fights: 33
- Wins: 17
- Win by KO: 7
- Losses: 13
- Draws: 3
- No contests: 0

David Rodela (born July 15, 1982) is an American professional boxer.

== Amateur career ==
Rodela was the 2004 U.S. National Lightweight Champion.

== Professional career ==
Rodela is trained by Freddie Roach. He is also the main sparring partner of Jose Benavidez, Manny Pacquiao and Amir Khan. On March 26, 2010 he lost by 3rd round T.K.O to top Junior Lightweight prospect, Mexican Dante Jardon.

== Professional boxing record ==
| 33 fights | 17 wins | 13 losses |
|---|---|---|
| By knockout | 7 | 9 |
| By decision | 10 | 4 |
| Draws | 3 | |

| Res. | Record | Opponent | Type | Rd., Time | Date | Location | Notes |
|---|---|---|---|---|---|---|---|
| Loss | 17–13–3 | (United States) Christian Gonzalez | KO | 1 (8) | 2016-03-04 | (United States) Belasco Theater, Los Angeles | |
| Loss | 17–12–3 | (Argentina) Marcelino Nicolas Lopez | KO | 3 (8) | 2015-10-03 | (United States) StubHub Center, Carson | |
| Loss | 17–11–3 | (Puerto Rico) Zachary Ochoa | UD | 8 | 2015-07-11 | (United States) Sports Arena, Los Angeles | |
| Loss | 17–10–3 | (United States) Jose Carlos Ramirez | KO | 1 (8) | 2014-10-25 | (United States) Selland Arena, Fresno | For vacant NABF junior welterweight title |
| Win | 17–9–3 | (United States) Tyrell Samuel | UD | 8 | 2014-07-11 | (United States) Performing Arts Center, Oxnard | |
| Loss | 16–9–3 | (United States) Stan Martyniouk | UD | 8 | 2013-07-20 | (United States) Red Lion Hotel, Sacramento | |
| Loss | 16–8–3 | (Venezuela) Jorge Linares | TKO | 8 (10) | 2013-03-16 | (Mexico) Grand Oasis Resort, Cancun | |
| Loss | 16–7–3 | (United States) Ronny Rios | TKO | 9 (10) | 2012-07-28 | (United States) Fantasy Springs Casino, Indio | |
| Loss | 16–6–3 | (United States) Terence Crawford | TKO | 2 (6) | 2012-06-08 | (United States) Hard Rock Hotel and Casino, The Joint, Las Vegas | |
| Win | 16–5–3 | (Mexico) Baudel Cardenas | KO | 2 (6) | 2012-02-25 | (United States) Oceanview Pavilion, Port Hueneme | |
