= Miguel Cotto vs. Canelo Álvarez =

Boxing match

- Date: November 21, 2015
- Venue: Mandalay Bay Events Center, Paradise, Nevada, U.S.
- Title(s) on the line: The Ring, TBRB and vacant WBC middleweight titles

Tale of the tape
Boxer	(Puerto Rico) Miguel Cotto	(Mexico) Saúl Álvarez
Nickname	"Junito"	"Canelo" ("Cinnamon")
Hometown	Caguas, Puerto Rico	Guadalajara, Jalisco, Mexico
Purse	$15,000,000	$5,000,000
Pre-fight record	40–4 (33 KO)	45–1–1 (32 KO)
Age	35 years	25 years, 4 months
Height	5 ft 8 in (173 cm)	5 ft 8 in (173 cm)
Weight	153 1/2 lb (70 kg)	155 lb (70 kg)
Style	Orthodox	Orthodox
Recognition	The Ring/TBRB; Middleweight Champion; 4-division world champion	WBC; No. 1 Ranked Middleweight; The Ring/TBRB; No. 1 Ranked Light middleweight Former Unified Light middleweight champion

Result
- Álvarez wins via 12-round unanimous decision (117-111, 119-109, 118-110)

Miguel Cotto vs. Canelo Álvarez was a professional boxing match contested on November 21, 2015, for the WBC, The Ring and TBRB middleweight championship. It took place at the Mandalay Bay Events Center in Paradise, Nevada. It was televised by HBO pay-per-view.

== Background ==
Having made one defence of the middleweight championship he had won from Sergio Martinez, dominating former titleholder Daniel Geale, Miguel Cotto agreed to face former Unified Light middleweight champion Canelo Álvarez with the winner set to face WBC "interim" champion Gennady Golovkin.

The fight took place at a catchweight of 155 lbs at Cotto's request.

On November 17, four days before the bout, the WBC announced that they were withdrawing recognition of Cotto as their Middleweight World Champion. The WBC's reasoning was "After several weeks of communications, countless attempts and good faith time extensions trying to preserve the fight as a WBC World Championship, Miguel Cotto and his promotion did not agree to comply with the WBC Rules & Regulations, while Canelo Alvarez has agreed to do so." This meant that, though Cotto was stripped of his title, Alvarez still had the opportunity to win the championship. Cotto then stated publicly that the reason the WBC stripped him of his title was because he refused to pay their sanctioning fees, which he believed to be excessive.

Álvarez was a 3-1 favorite to win.

== The fights ==
=== Undercard ===
Among the preliminary bouts Zhilei Zhang survived a last round knockdown to outpoint Juan Goode.

The PPV card began with Ronny Rios scoring a decision over Jayson Velez, which was followed by Guillermo Rigondeaux earning a wide decision victory over Drian Francisco.

=== Miura vs. Vargas ===
Takashi Miura vs Francisco Vargas
- Title(s) on the line: WBC super featherweight title

Tale of the tape
Boxer	(Japan) Takashi Miura	(Mexico) Francisco Vargas
Nickname	"Bomber Left"	El Bandido ("The Bandit")
Hometown	Mitane, Akita-ken, Japan	Mexico City, Ciudad de México, Mexico
Purse	$400,000	$200,000
Pre-fight record	29–2–2 (22 KO)	22–0–1 (16 KO)
Age	31 years, 6 months	30 years, 10 months
Height	5 ft 7 in (170 cm)	5 ft 8 in (173 cm)
Weight	130 lb (59 kg)	129 1/2 lb (59 kg)
Style	Southpaw	Orthodox
Recognition	WBC; Super Featherweight Champion; The Ring; No. 1 Ranked Super Featherweight; TBRB; No. 2 Ranked Super Featherweight	WBC; No. 1 Ranked Super Featherweight; The Ring; No. 4 Ranked Super Featherweight; TBRB; No. 6 Ranked Super Featherweight

Result
- Vargas defeats Miura by 9th round TKO

The co-feature of the fight saw Takashi Miura, defending the WBC world super featherweight title for the fifth time against Francisco Vargas, who was the mandatory challenger.

Miura, who was fighting in the United States for the first time and for only the second time outside of Japan said during the build up "Francisco Vargas has proved himself to be a tough competitor, but I have repeatedly fought to keep my WBC title and on Nov. 21, I will show American fans once again why I am a champion.".

==== The fight ====
The bout would turn out to be a brutal affair, Vargas hurting the champion in the 1st round with a straight counter right. Miura would then have success with a straight left and body punches, opening a sizable cut under Vargas' right eye. In the 4th a right-left combination sent Vargas down. He beat the count but as the fight progressed his eye became more and more swelled as Miura landed a string of lefts. Vargas would start the 8th strongly before getting badly hurt by a furry in the corner at the end of the round. In the 9th, Vargas landed a hard right that knocked down Miura, the champion beat the count but Vargas kept landing punches including a left uppercut followed by a number of body shots. The heavy punishment prompted referee Tony Weeks to step in and wave the bout off.

At the time of the stoppage, Miura led on two of the scorecards 77–74 and 76–75, with the third scoring it 75–75.

==== Aftermath ====
The bout was eventually named The Ring magazine Fight of the Year for 2015.

Preceded by vs. Billy Dib	Takashi Miura's bouts 21 November 2015	Succeeded by vs. Jimmy Borbon
Preceded by vs. Will Tomlinson	Francisco Vargas's bouts 21 November 2015	Succeeded by vs. Orlando Salido
Awards
Previous: Lucas Matthysse vs. John Molina, Jr.	The Ring Fight of the Year; 2015	Next: Francisco Vargas vs. Orlando Salido
Previous: Lucas Matthysse vs. John Molina, Jr.	Ali–Frazier Award; 2015	Next: Francisco Vargas vs. Orlando Salido

=== Main Event ===
The fight was close throughout as both boxers were cautious in their attacks, neither fighter was seriously hurt. As Cotto attacked with a jab the whole fight, and didn't sit down on his punches, instead deciding to employ movement. Álvarez responded with power punches, landing especially to the body. Both fighters showed iron chins, with Cotto repeatedly coming back after hard shots to the head.

The scorecards at the end of the night were highly controversial as they did not show the competitiveness of the fight, with many boxing pundits having Álvarez winning by a round or two, others called it a draw. The official judges' scorecards read 119–109, 118–110, and 117–111 for Álvarez. ESPN.com had the fight much closer, but still scored it in favour of Álvarez at 115–113, as did The Guardian. HBO's unofficial scorer Harold Lederman scored the fight 117–111 for Álvarez, as did Doug Fischer of The Ring.

According to CompuBox, Álvarez landed 155 of 484 punches (32 percent), and Cotto landed 129 of 629 (21 percent), with Álvarez landing the heavier blows and inflicting more damage. There was a fraction of the boxing world that felt Cotto won by both a small margin, while others felt he won decisively. Cotto left immediately after hearing the scorecards, with his team and family.

== Aftermath ==
According to HBO, the fight generated 900,000 buys on PPV, which equated to around $58 million in domestic revenue. This was the first time since 2002, that a PPV generated 900,000 which didn't include Mayweather, Pacquiao or De La Hoya. That bout was a heavyweight title fight between Lennox Lewis and Mike Tyson.

== Fight card ==
Confirmed bouts:

Weight Class	Weight		vs.		Method	Round	Time	Notes
Middleweight	155 lbs.	(Mexico) Canelo Álvarez	def.	(Puerto Rico) Miguel Cotto (c)	UD	12		^{Note 1}
Super Featherweight	130 lbs.	(Mexico) Francisco Vargas	def.	(Japan) Takashi Miura (c)	TKO	9/12	1:31	^{Note 2}
Super Bantamweight	122 lbs.	(Cuba) Guillermo Rigondeaux	def.	(Philippines) Drian Francisco	UD	10
Featherweight	126 lbs.	(United States) Ronny Rios	def.	(Puerto Rico) Jayson Velez	UD	10
Preliminary Card
Super Featherweight	130 lbs.	(Mexico) Alberto Machado	def.	(United States) Tyrone Luckey	TKO	1/4	2:44
Super Flyweight	115 lbs.	(Puerto Rico) José Mercado	def.	(United States) Oscar Mojica	UD	8
Heavyweight	Unlimited	(China) Zhilei Zhang	def.	(United States) Juan Goode	UD	4
Lightweight	135 lbs.	(United States) Hector Tanajara Jr.	def.	(Mexico) Jose Fabian Naranjo	KO	1/4	2:10

^Note 1 For WBC and The Ring Middleweight titles. Only Canelo Álvarez may win the WBC Middleweight title. If Miguel Cotto wins, interim champion Gennady Golovkin becomes the WBC Middleweight champion, with Cotto having been stripped a few days prior due to a dispute over sanctioning fees.
^Note 2 For WBC Super Featherweight title.

== Broadcasting ==
Country	Broadcaster
Australia	Main Event
Mexico	Azteca
Panama	RPC
United Kingdom	BoxNation
United States	HBO

Preceded by vs. Daniel Geale	Miguel Cotto's bouts 21 November 2015	Succeeded by vs. Yoshihiro Kamegai
Preceded by vs. James Kirkland	Canelo Álvarez's bouts 21 November 2015	Succeeded by vs. Amir Khan
