= Irving Berry =

Panamanian boxer

Personal information
- Born: 11 January 1986 (age 40) Panama City, Panama
- Height: 5 ft 10 in (1.78 m)
- Weight: Featherweight

Boxing career
- Reach: 72 in (182 cm)
- Stance: Orthodox

Boxing record
- Total fights: 34
- Wins: 23
- Win by KO: 9
- Losses: 9
- Draws: 2
- No contests: 0

Irving Berry (born 11 January 1986) is a Panamanian professional boxer and is the second ranked featherweight for the WBA championship.

== Professional career ==
On 4 December 2010, Berry lost first title shot to WBA featherweight champion, Jonathan Victor Barros.

Achievements
New title	WBA International Featherweight Champion; June 4, 2010 – October 4, 2010; Lost bid for world title	Vacant
