= Marcelino Nicolas Lopez =

Argentine boxer

Marcelino Lopez
Personal information
- Nickname: Nino
- Born: Marcelino Nicolas Lopez; 6 May 1986 (age 40) Arribeños, Argentina
- Height: 1.68 m (5 ft 6 in)
- Weight: Lightweight

Boxing career
- Reach: 198 cm (78 in)
- Stance: Orthodox

Boxing record
- Total fights: 42
- Wins: 37
- Win by KO: 22
- Losses: 4
- Draws: 1

Marcelino Nicolas Lopez (born 6 May 1986) is an Argentine professional boxer. He held the WBC Latino lightweight title.

== Professional career ==
On 28 May 2010 Lopez won vacant WBC Latino Lightweight title against Alberto Leopoldo Santillan.

On 23 August, Lopez won Argentina (FAB) lightweight title against Sergio Gonzalez.

On 27 January 2018 Nino won by TKO over Breidis Prescott, dropped Prescott in the fifth round before repeating job and seeing the Colombian stay down for the ten count.

== Professional boxing record ==
37 Wins (22 knockouts), 2 Losses, 1 Draws
Res.	Record	Opponent	Type	Rd.,Time	Date	Location	Notes
Win	37–2–1	(Mexico) Jario Lopez	TKO	5 (10)	2021-03-20	(United States) Dickies Arena, Fort Worth, USA	
Win	36–2–1	(Mexico) Daniel Echeverria	KO	5 (10)	2019-08-10	(United States) The Theater at Grand Prairie, Grand Prairie, USA	
Win	35–2–1	(Mexico) Jose Guillermo Garcia	TKO	6 (8)	2019-06-29	(Mexico) Grand Oasis Arena, Cancun	
Win	34–2–1	(Colombia) Breidis Prescott	KO	5 (8)	2018-01-27	(United States) Forum, Inglewood, USA	
Win	33–2–1	(Mexico) Pablo Cesar Cano	KO	2 (10)	2017-10-13	(United States) Fantasy Springs Casino, Indio, USA	
Loss	32–2–1	(United States) Michael Perez	SD	10 (10)	2017-04-20	(United States) Turning Stone Resort & Casino, Verona, New York, USA	
Win	32–1–1	(United States) David Rodela	KO	3 (8)	2015-10-03	(United States) StubHub Center, Carson, California, USA	
Win	31–1–1	(Argentina) Sergio Javier Escobar	TKO	8 (12)	2015-03-13	Club Ciclista Juninense, Junín, Buenos Aires, Argentina	Retain South American light welterweight title
Win	30–1–1	(Argentina) Diego Martin Aguilera	TKO	5 (12)	2014-10-31	Centro de E. F. Nº 58, Buenos Aires, Argentina	Won vacant South American light welterweight title
Loss	29–1–1	(Argentina) Pablo Martin Barboza	UD	10 (10)	2014-07-25	Club Racing, Teodolina, Santa Fe, Argentina	Loss Argentina (FAB) lightweight title
Win	29–0–1	(Argentina) Sergio Javier Escobar	MD	10 (10)	2014-05-30	Club Ciclista Juninense, Junín, Buenos Aires, Argentina	Retain Argentina (FAB) lightweight title
Win	28–0–1	(Brazil) Sidney Siqueira	TKO	3 (10)	2014-01-17	Club Ciclista Juninense, Junín, Buenos Aires, Argentina	Retain WBC Latino lightweight title
Win	27–0–1	(Argentina) Sergio Eduardo Gonzalez	TKO	9 (10)	2013-08-23	Club Ciclista Juninense, Junín, Buenos Aires, Argentina	Retain WBC Latino lightweight title
Draw	26–0–1	(Argentina) Sergio Javier Escobar	PTS	10 (10)	2013-05-25	Villa Mercedes, San Luis, Argentina	Retain WBC Latino lightweight title
Win	26–0	(Colombia) Humberto Martinez	UD	10 (10)	2012-12-21	Polideportivo Fray Mamerto Esquiú, Catamarca, Catamarca, Argentina	
Win	25–0	(Argentina) Julio Cesar Ruiz	SD	10 (10)	2012-10-19	Club Ciclista Juninense, Junín, Buenos Aires, Argentina	Retained WBC Latino lightweight title
Win	24–0	(Colombia) Fabian Marimon	TKO	5 (10)	2012-05-11	Super Domo Orfeo, Cordoba, Cordoba, Argentina	Retained WBC Latino lightweight title
Win	23–0	(Argentina) Victor Hugo Velazquez	RTD	7 (10)	2012-04-13	Club Ciclista Juninense, Junín, Buenos Aires, Argentina	
Win	22–0	(Colombia) Fabian Marimon	TKO	7 (10)	2011-10-14	Polideportivo Hipolito Yrigoyen, Lujan, Mendoza, Argentina	Retained WBC Latino lightweight title
Win	21–0	(Argentina) Alberto Leopoldo Santillan	SD	10 (10)	2011-04-08	Club Ciclista Juninense, Junín, Buenos Aires, Argentina	
Win	20–0	(Colombia) Jailer Berrio	KO	3 (10)	2010-11-19	Estadio Aldo Cantoni, San Juan, San Juan, Argentina	
Win	19–0	(Argentina) Jeremias Ezequiel Castillo	RTD	6 (10)	2010-09-10	Santa Rosa, La Pampa, Argentina	Retained WBC Latino lightweight title
Win	18–0	(Argentina) Alberto Leopoldo Santillan	MD	10 (10)	2010-05-28	Estadio U.T.N., Santa Fe, Santa Fe, Argentina	Won vacant WBC Latino lightweight title
Win	17–0	(Argentina) Javier Osvaldo Alvarez	TKO	2 (6)	2009-11-21	Buenos Aires Lawn Tennis Club, Capital Federal, Argentina	
Win	16–0	(Argentina) Domingo Mariano Aguirre	UD	4 (4)	2009-10-23	Club Estudiantes, Santa Rosa, La Pampa, Argentina	
Win	15–0	(Argentina) Nestor Fabian Lagos	TKO	1 (6)	2009-09-26	Banderalo, Buenos Aires, Argentina	
Win	14–0	(Argentina) Gonzalo Gabriel Ovando	UD	6 (6)	2009-05-16	Estadio Cr. Gaston Guelfi/ Palacio Peñarol, Montevideo, Uruguay	
Win	13–0	(Argentina) Guillermo de Jesus Paz	UD	6 (6)	2009-03-06	Parque Prado Español, Ascension, Buenos Aires, Argentina	
Win	12–0	(Argentina) Miguel Dario Lombardo	UD	6 (6)	2008-11-28	Club Sportivo Rojas, Rojas, Buenos Aires, Argentina	
Win	11–0	(Argentina) Ricardo Fabricio Chamorro	RTD	2 (6)	2008-06-13	Club Ciclista Juninense, Junín, Buenos Aires, Argentina	
Win	10–0	(Argentina) Jorge Luis Rodriguez	KO	1 (8)	2008-05-16	Club El Linqueno, Lincoln, Buenos Aires, Argentina	
Win	9–0	(Argentina) Leandro Almagro	UD	4 (4)	2007-12-21	Club Alsina, Los Toldos, Buenos Aires, Argentina	
Win	8–0	(Argentina) Sergio Javier Escobar	MD	4 (4)	2007-11-30	Club Ciclista Juninense, Junín, Buenos Aires, Argentina	
Win	7–0	(Argentina) Nelson David Gil	KO	2 (4)	2007-11-09	Salon de los Deportes, Villa Maria, Cordoba, Argentina	
Win	6–0	(Argentina) Ariel Orlando Garcia	TKO	3 (4)	2007-10-12	Gimnasio Pedro Estremador, Bariloche, Rio Negro, Argentina	
Win	5–0	(Argentina) Marco Antonio Soraire	KO	2 (4)	2007-09-21	Salón de la Unión Ferroviaria, Buenos Aires, Argentina	
Win	4–0	(Argentina) Flavio Dario Pedemonte	UD	4 (4)	2007-08-31	Club Atlanta, Vedia, Buenos Aires, Argentina	
Win	3–0	(Argentina) Jose Edgardo Soraire	UD	4 (4)	2007-06-15	Arribenos, Buenos Aires, Argentina	
Win	2–0	(Argentina) Juan Manuel Chaves	UD	4 (4)	2007-03-31	Club Isidro Casanova, Isidro Casanova, Buenos Aires, Argentina	
Win	1–0	(Argentina) Juan Manuel Flores	UD	4 (4)	2006-12-15	Ce.De.M. N° 2, Caseros, Buenos Aires, Argentina	
