= Jonathan Victor Barros =

Argentine boxer (born 1984)

Personal information
- Nickname: Yoni
- Born: 30 January 1984 (age 42) Guaymallén, Mendoza, Argentina
- Height: 5 ft 6 in (168 cm)
- Weight: Featherweight; Super featherweight

Boxing career
- Stance: Orthodox

Boxing record
- Total fights: 52
- Wins: 43
- Win by KO: 22
- Losses: 8
- Draws: 1

Jonathan Victor Barros (born 30 January 1984) is an Argentine professional boxer. He held the WBA (Regular) featherweight title from 2010 to 2011.

== Professional career ==
=== IBF featherweight championship ===
In March 2010, Barros lost to IBF featherweight champion Yuriorkis Gamboa and his first shot at a World championship.

=== WBA featherweight championship ===
On 4 December 2010, Barros beat the veteran Irving Berry and won the WBA World featherweight championship. On 12 March 2011 Barros had his first successful title defense against Miguel Roman, followed by another against Celestino Caballero. However, Barros lost the title in a rematch against Caballero on 14 October 2011. Barros lost to undefeated Mikey Garcia on 10 November 2012.

=== IBF featherweight championship ===
On 15 July 2017, Barros faced Lee Selby for the IBF featherweight title. Selby started the fight off well, and looked livelier than Barros, moving well and trying to land left hooks. In the sixth, Barros showed resilience, as Selby did not look as good as in the early rounds. But Selby got back on his toes in the eighth, boxing well and keeping his advantage on the scorecards. Selby managed to drop Barros in the final round to cement a unanimous decision on the scorecards.

=== WBC super-featherweight championship ===
In his next fight, Barros again challenged for a world title, this time against WBC super featherweight champion Miguel Berchelt. Berchelt started strong and dropped Barros in the second round with a big left hook. Barros managed to get up and continued fighting, until he got dropped again in the third round, when his corner decided to stop the contest.

In his next fight, Barros faced an experienced veteran in Alfredo Santiago. Barros got dominated by his opponent, losing the fight by unanimous decision.

== Professional boxing record ==
52 fights	43 wins	8 losses
By knockout	22	3
By decision	20	5
By disqualification	1	0
Draws	1	

No.	Result	Record	Opponent	Type	Round, time	Date	Location	Notes
52	Loss	43–8–1	Jaime Arboleda	TKO	4 (10), 2:04	19 August 2021	Centro de Convenciones Vasco Nunez de Balboa, Bella Vista, Panama	
51	Win	43–7–1	Jorge Rodrigo Barrios	UD	10	20 February 2021	Arena Villa Carlos Paz, Villa Carlos Paz, Argentina	
50	Win	42–7–1	Guillermo Osvaldo Soloppi	UD	6	20 September 2019	Polideportivo Vicente Polimeni, Las Heras, Argentina	
49	Loss	41–7–1	Alfredo Santiago	UD	12	1 December 2018	Parque de Pelota Pedro "Perucho" Cepeda, Cataño, Puerto Rico	
48	Loss	41–6–1	Miguel Berchelt	TKO	3 (12), 1:53	23 June 2018	Poliforum Zamna, Mérida, Mexico	For WBC super featherweight title
47	Loss	41–5–1	Lee Selby	UD	12	15 July 2017	The SSE Arena, Wembley, England, U.K.	For IBF featherweight title
46	Win	41–4–1	Satoshi Hosono	SD	12	3 October 2016	Korakuen Hall, Tokyo, Japan	
45	Win	40–4–1	Pablo Martin Barboza	UD	10	19 December 2015	Salón Múltiple de la Sociedad Española, Villada, Argentina	
44	Win	39–4–1	Sergio Eduardo Gonzalez	TKO	6 (10)	14 March 2015	Club Sportivo Las Parejas, Las Parejas, Argentina	
43	Win	38–4–1	Sergio Javier Escobar	UD	10	25 October 2014	Club Atlético Talleres, Villa Gobernador Gálvez, Argentina	
42	Win	37–4–1	Cid Edson Bispo Ribeiro	KO	1 (10)	8 February 2014	Estadio F.A.B., Buenos Aires, Argentina	Retained IBF Latino featherweight title
41	Win	36–4–1	Isaias Santos Sampaio	KO	2 (10)	28 September 2013	Polideportivo Gustavo Toro Rodriguez, San Martín, Argentina	Won vacant IBF Latino featherweight title
40	Win	35–4–1	Diego Alberto Chaves	KO	5 (6)	18 May 2013	Gimnasio Sthimpra, General Fernández Oro, Argentina	
39	Loss	34–4–1	Mikey Garcia	TKO	8 (10)	10 November 2012	Wynn Resort, Paradise, Nevada, U.S.	
38	Loss	34–3–1	Juan Carlos Salgado	UD	12	18 August 2012	Gimnasio Miguel Hidalgo, Puebla, Mexico	For IBF super featherweight title
37	Win	34–2–1	Gustavo Bermudez	UD	10	23 June 2012	Palacio Contador Gastón Guelfi, Montevideo, Uruguay	
36	Loss	33–2–1	Celestino Caballero	UD	12	14 October 2011	Estadio Luna Park, Buenos Aires, Argentina	Lost WBA (Regular) featherweight title
35	Win	33–1–1	Celestino Caballero	SD	12	2 July 2011	Polideportivo La Colonia, Junín, Argentina	Retained WBA (Regular) featherweight title
34	Win	32–1–1	Miguel Roman	UD	12	12 March 2011	Polideportivo La Colonia, Junín, Argentina	Retained WBA (Regular) featherweight title
33	Win	31–1–1	Irving Berry	TKO	7 (12), 0:20	4 December 2010	Polideportivo Vicente Polimeni, Las Heras, Argentina	Won vacant WBA (Regular) featherweight title
32	Win	30–1–1	Gustavo Bermudez	KO	1 (10)	9 October 2010	Polideportivo San Pedro, San Martín, Argentina	
31	Win	29–1–1	Adrian Flamenco	UD	8	29 May 2010	Club Once Unidos, Mar del Plata, Argentina	
30	Loss	28–1–1	Yuriorkis Gamboa	UD	12	27 March 2010	Alsterdorfer Sporthalle, Hamburg, Germany	For WBA (Regular) featherweight title
29	Win	28–0–1	Lazaro Santos de Jesus	UD	6	13 February 2010	Hotel & Casino Conrad, Punta del Este, Uruguay	
28	Win	27–0–1	Luis Martinez	KO	3 (8), 2:04	18 December 2009	Polideportivo La Colonia, Junín, Argentina	
27	Win	26–0–1	Guillermo de Jesus Paz	UD	10	17 October 2009	Polideportivo Municipal, Tunuyán, Argentina	
26	Win	25–0–1	Carlos Rodriguez	RTD	5 (10), 0:01	16 May 2009	Estadio Luna Park, Buenos Aires, Argentina	Retained WBO Latino featherweight title
25	Win	24–0–1	Cristian Palma	KO	5 (12)	7 February 2009	Nuevo Palacio Aurinegro, Puerto Madryn, Argentina	Retained WBO Latino featherweight title
24	Win	23–0–1	Hardy Paredes	TKO	3 (10)	12 September 2008	Polideportivo Carlos Magalot, Río Grande, Argentina	
23	Win	22–0–1	Cristian Lopez	KO	1 (10), 2:29	26 July 2008	Polideportivo Fortunato Perazzoli, San Carlos, Argentina	
22	Win	21–0–1	Leandro Almagro	UD	6	26 April 2008	Ce.De.M. N° 1, Caseros, Argentina	
21	Win	20–0–1	Victor Hugo Paz	TKO	2 (10), 2:43	26 January 2008	Estadio Socios Fundadores, Comodoro Rivadavia, Argentina	Won vacant WBO Latino featherweight title
20	Win	19–0–1	Pastor Maurin	DQ	4 (10)	29 September 2007	Estadio Cerrado 8 de Junio, Paysandú, Uruguay	Won vacant Argentine featherweight title
19	Win	18–0–1	Hector Cisneros	TKO	5 (6), 1:01	24 August 2007	Estadio Pascual Perez, Mendoza, Argentina	
18	Win	17–0–1	Anibal Pieroni	TKO	4 (6), 1:37	22 June 2007	Polideportivo Vicente Polimeni, Las Heras, Argentina	
17	Win	16–0–1	Gerardo Gomez	KO	9 (10), 1:07	19 May 2007	Ce.De.M. N° 1, Caseros, Argentina	
16	Win	15–0–1	Victor Hugo Paz	UD	6	20 April 2007	Andes Talleres Sport Club, Godoy Cruz, Argentina	
15	Win	14–0–1	Gerardo Gomez	UD	6	24 February 2007	Auditorio Ángel Bustelo, Mendoza, Argentina	
14	Win	13–0–1	Eduardo Ramos	KO	2 (6)	25 November 2006	Club Sportivo Barraca, Armstrong, Argentina	
13	Draw	12–0–1	Victor Hugo Paz	PTS	6	26 August 2006	Polideportivo Municipal Malal Hue, Malargüe, Argentina	
12	Win	12–0	Rudy Mairena Ruiz	UD	6	27 May 2006	Ce.De.M. N° 1, Caseros, Argentina	
11	Win	11–0	Julio Martinez	TKO	4 (4), 2:23	28 January 2006	Polideportivo Municipal, Tunuyán, Argentina	
10	Win	10–0	Ricardo Arano	UD	8	1 November 2005	Ce.De.M. N° 1, Caseros, Argentina	
9	Win	9–0	Rudy Mairena Ruiz	UD	6	17 September 2005	Polideportivo Municipal Malal Hue, Malargüe, Argentina	
8	Win	8–0	Daniel Vega	TKO	2 (4), 0:44	8 July 2005	Estadio Polideportivo, Tunuyán, Argentina	
7	Win	7–0	Claudio Bejarano	TKO	4 (4), 2:36	3 June 2005	Estadio Pascual Perez, Mendoza, Argentina	
6	Win	6–0	Mauricio Crucce	TKO	4 (4), 1:52	9 April 2005	Estadio Pascual Perez, Mendoza, Argentina	
5	Win	5–0	José Luis Avila	UD	4	13 November 2004	Polideportivo Posta del Retamo, Junín, Argentina	
4	Win	4–0	Claudio Gomez	UD	4	30 October 2004	Club San Martín, Marcos Juárez, Argentina	
3	Win	3–0	Alejandro Gomez	TKO	4 (4), 0:40	10 September 2004	Polideportivo Posta del Retamo, Junín, Argentina	
2	Win	2–0	Alejandro Ontivero	UD	4	29 May 2004	Estadio Pascual Perez, Mendoza, Argentina	
1	Win	1–0	Luis Mena	TKO	3 (4)	26 March 2004	Estadio Pascual Perez, Mendoza, Argentina	

== See also ==
- List of world featherweight boxing champions

Sporting positions
Regional boxing titles
Vacant Title last held by Juan Gerardo Cabrera	Argentine featherweight champion 29 September 2007 – 4 December 2010; Won world title	Vacant Title next held by Jesús Cuellar
Vacant Title last held by Roinet Caballero	WBO Latino featherweight champion 26 January 2008 – 2010; Vacated	Vacant Title next held by Jesús Cuellar
Vacant Title last held by Mauricio Javier Munoz	IBF Latino featherweight champion 28 September 2013 – 2015; Vacated	Vacant Title next held by Keenan Carbajal
World boxing titles
Vacant Title last held by Yuriorkis Gamboa	WBA featherweight champion Regular title 4 December 2010 – 14 October 2011	Succeeded by Celestino Caballero
