= Sidney Siqueira =

Brazilian boxer (born 1977)

Personal information
- Born: Sidney Jose de Siqueira Santos; 22 July 1977 (age 48) Trindade, Pernambuco, Brazil
- Height: 5 ft 7 in (170 cm)
- Weight: Lightweight; Light welterweight

Boxing career
- Reach: 76 in (193 cm)
- Stance: Orthodox

Boxing record
- Total fights: 40
- Wins: 26
- Win by KO: 17
- Losses: 13
- Draws: 1

Sidney Jose de Siqueira Santos (born 22 July 1987) is a Brazilian former professional boxer who competed from 2005 to 2017. He is a former Conselho Nacional De Boxe (CNB) lightweight champion.

== Professional career ==
Siqueira began his career with a loss to Andre Marcos Nascimento, but rebounded with an eight-fight winning streak. During that run, he avenged the defeat against Nascimento, defeating him in their second meeting to capture the vacant Brazilian (CNB) lightweight title.

Siqueira notably faced future five-division world champion and three-division undisputed champion Terence Crawford, suffering a knockout loss in November 2012 at the Wynn Las Vegas. On 17 January 2014, he challenged Marcelino Nicolas Lopez for the WBC Latino lightweight title, but was knocked out in the third round. On 12 December 2015, Siqueira faced WBA interim lightweight champion José Benavidez Jr. in a non-title bout, losing by unanimous decision.

Siqueira retired with a professional record of 26–13–1.

== Professional boxing record ==
40 fights	26 wins	13 losses
By knockout	17	6
By decision	9	7
Draws	1	

No.	Result	Record	Opponent	Type	Round, time	Date	Location	Notes
40	Loss	26–13–1	Mike Alvarado	KO	4 (8)	19 Aug 2017	Pinnacle Bank Arena, Lincoln, Nebraska, U.S.	
39	Loss	26–12–1	Mike Reed	UD	8 (8)	10 Dec 2016	CenturyLink Center, Omaha, Nebraska, U.S.	
38	Loss	26–11–1	José Benavidez Jr.	UD	10 (10)	12 Dec 2015	Convention Center, Tucson, U.S.	
37	Loss	26–10–1	Vitor Jones	UD	10 (10)	15 Aug 2015	Arena Santos, Santos, Brazil	For Brazilian (CNB) lightweight title
36	Loss	26–9–1	Vitor Jones	UD	6 (6)	6 Jun 2015	Arena Santos, Santos, Brazil	
35	Win	26–8–1	Jailton de Jesus Souza	KO	4 (6)	13 Dec 2014	Sede A.G.B., Guarulhos, Brazil	
34	Win	25–8–1	Filipe dos Anjos Matos	TKO	3 (6)	8 Aug 2014	Alphaville, São Paulo, Brazil	
33	Win	24–8–1	Genival Roque de Azevedo Filho	TKO	2 (8)	15 Mar 2014	São Carlos, São Paulo, Brazil	
32	Loss	23–8–1	Marcelino Nicolas Lopez	TKO	3 (10)	17 Jan 2014	Club Ciclista Juninense, Junín, Argentina	For WBC Latino lightweight title
31	Win	23–7–1	Rafael Mactavisch	KO	1 (8)	14 Dec 2013	São Paulo, Brazil	
30	Win	22–7–1	Marilson Inacio Pereira	TKO	3 (8)	8 Jun 2013	Cordeirópolis, São Paulo, Brazil	
29	Win	21–7–1	Genival Roque de Azevedo Filho	TKO	4 (8)	4 May 2013	Itapira, São Paulo, Brazil	
28	Win	20–7–1	Rodolfo Franz	TKO	3 (6)	15 Dec 2012	ID Academia do Boxe, São Paulo, Brazil	
27	Loss	19–7–1	Terence Crawford	TKO	6 (8)	10 Nov 2012	Wynn, Paradise, Nevada	
26	Win	19–6–1	Genival Roque de Azevedo Filho	UD	4 (4)	9 Jun 2012	Ginasio Municipal do Polvilho, Cajamar, Brazil	
25	Win	18–6–1	Jack Welson	DQ	3 (6)	4 Feb 2012	Ginásio Municipal, Valparaíso, Brazil	
24	Win	17–6–1	Ubiraci Borges dos Santos	UD	6 (6)	3 Dec 2011	ID Academia do Boxe, São Paulo, Brazil	
23	Loss	16–6–1	Moses Paulus	UD	10 (10)	24 Sep 2011	Windhoek Country Club Resort, Windhoek, Namibia	
22	Win	16–5–1	Domingos de Jesus	TKO	3 (6)	26 Feb 2011	Ginásio Mane Garrincha, São Paulo, Brazil	
21	Win	15–5–1	Lucival Barradas	TKO	3 (10)	25 Jul 2010	Cachoeira do Arari, Pará, Brazil	Won Brazilian (CNB) lightweight title
20	Win	14–5–1	Carmelito de Jesus	UD	8 (8)	4 May 2010	Ginásio Baby Barione, São Paulo, Brazil	
19	Win	13–5–1	Reginaldo Silva Tavares	KO	1 (6)	17 Apr 2010	São Paulo, Brazil	
18	Loss	12–5–1	Emmanuel Lartey	UD	10 (10)	26 Sep 2009	Ohene Djan Sports Stadium, Accra, Ghana	
17	Loss	12–4–1	DeMarcus Corley	TKO	8 (8)	9 May 2009	Stadium Khadjimukan, Shymkent, Kazakhstan	
16	Loss	12–3–1	Brunet Zamora	KO	5 (12)	18 Sep 2008	Autodromo, Adria, Italy	For WBA Inter-Continental light welterweight title
15	Win	12–2–1	Jose Claudio da Silva	TKO	2 (6)	1 Mar 2008	Academia Unica, São Paulo, Brazil	
14	Win	11–2–1	Guilherme dos Santos	TKO	3 (4)	25 Sep 2007	Montes Claros, Minas Gerais, Brazil	
13	Win	10–2–1	Dione Rodrigues Gomes	UD	6 (6)	3 Aug 2007	Ginásio Municipal Blota Junior, Ribeirão Bonito, Brazil	
12	Win	9–2–1	Antonio Maria do Nascimento	TKO	2 (10)	2 Jun 2007	Rio de Janeiro, Brazil	Retained Brazilian (CNB) lightweight title
11	Loss	8–2–1	Alexandro de Matos	TKO	2 (8)	15 Nov 2006	Prefeitura Municipal, Itupeva, Brazil	
10	Draw	8–1–1	Sergio Rafael Liendo	TD	4 (10)	21 Oct 2006	Ginásio Municipal, Cajamar, Brazil	
9	Win	8–1–0	Andre Marcos Nascimento	SD	10 (10)	2 Sep 2006	Ginásio Lourenção, Bragança Paulista, Brazil	Won vacant Brazilian (CNB) lightweight title
8	Win	7–1–0	Antonio Santos Rosario	TKO	2 (4)	27 May 2006	Ginásio de Esportes, Pilar do Sul, Brazil	
7	Win	6–1–0	Andre Marcos Nascimento	UD	10 (10)	21 Jan 2006	Ilha Comprida, São Paulo, Brazil	
6	Win	5–1–0	Antonio Carlos Bispo	TKO	6 (8)	25 Nov 2005	Indaiatuba, São Paulo, Brazil	
5	Win	4–1–0	Renato Pedro	UD	4 (4)	29 Oct 2005	Cajamar, São Paulo, Brazil	
4	Win	3–1–0	Andre Luiz da Cunha Pereira	TKO	1 (4)	24 Sep 2005	Ginásio Municipal, Monte Mor, Brazil	
3	Win	2–1–0	Aldimar Silva	UD	4 (4)	23 Jul 2005	Gimnasio Municipal, Embu das Artes, Brazil	
2	Win	1–1–0	Francisco Almeida	KO	4 (6)	10 Jun 2005	Ferraz de Vasconcelos, São Paulo, Brazil	
1	Loss	0–1–0	Andre Marcos Nascimento	UD	4 (4)	1 May 2005	Carapicuíba, São Paulo, Brazil	
