= Hardy Paredes =

Chilean boxer (born 1983)

Personal information
- Nickname: El Huracán
- Born: Hardy Mauricio Paredes Barrera; 4 March 1983 (age 43) Osorno, Chile
- Height: 5 ft 5 in (165 cm)
- Weight: featherweight Lightweight

Boxing career
- Reach: 67 1/2 in (171 cm)
- Stance: Orthodox

Boxing record
- Total fights: 34
- Wins: 18
- Win by KO: 11
- Losses: 16

Hardy Mauricio Paredes Barrera (born 4 March 1983) is a Chilean former professional boxer who competed from 2004 to 2018. He is a former Chilean featherweight and lightweight champion. He is also a former WBA Fedebol lightweight champion.

== Professional career ==
Paredes opened his professional career with a 7–1 record before capturing the vacant Chilean featherweight title with a victory over Juan Nahuel on 25 November 2005. On 20 February 2009, he defeated Carlos Narvaez by fifth-round technical knockout to capture the vacant Chilean lightweight title, becoming a two-division Chilean champion.

Paredes notably faced five-division world champion and three-division undisputed champion Terence Crawford on 13 September 2012, suffering a fourth-round technical knockout loss. On 11 December 2015, Paredes defeated Jonivan Baretto Santos for the vacant WBA Fedebol lightweight title.

Paredes retired with a professional record of 18–16.

== Personal life ==
Outside the ring, Paredes worked as a mechanic, employed in a radiator and heavy-machinery workshop.

== Professional boxing record ==
34 fights	18 wins	16 losses
By knockout	11	8
By decision	7	8

No.	Result	Record	Opponent	Type	Round, time	Date	Location	Notes
34	Loss	18–16	Carlos Diaz	UD	10 (10)	9 Feb 2018	Medialuna Municipal, Lautaro, Chile	For Chilean lightweight title
33	Loss	18–15	Diego Martin Aguilera	KO	2 (8)	19 Nov 2016	Teatro Circo Caupolicán, Santiago, Chile	
32	Loss	18–14	Casey Ramos	KO	5 (8)	16 Jul 2016	Pioneer Event Center, Lancaster, Pennsylvania, U.S.	
31	Win	18–13	Jonivan Barreto Santos	KO	3 (9)	11 Dec 2015	Gimnasio Municipal, San Pablo, Chile	Won vacant WBA Fedebol lightweight title
30	Win	17–13	Miguel Leonardo Caceres	UD	8 (8)	26 Sep 2014	Gimnasio Municipal, San Pablo, Chile	
29	Loss	16–13	Robert Easter Jr.	KO	1 (8)	14 Dec 2013	Alamodome, San Antonio, Texas, U.S.	
28	Loss	16–12	Takahiro Ao	KO	2 (10)	13 Jul 2013	Hollywood Park Casino, Inglewood, California, U.S.	
27	Win	16–11	Eduardo Rafael Reyes	KO	2 (6)	2 Feb 2013	McAllen Convention Center, McAllen, Texas, U.S.	
26	Loss	15–11	Terence Crawford	TKO	4 (8)	13 Sep 2012	Hard Rock Hotel and Casino, Las Vegas, Nevada, U.S.	
25	Win	15–10	Cid Edson Bispo Ribeiro	TKO	1 (12)	18 Nov 2011	Gimnasio Español, Osorno, Chile	
24	Loss	14–10	Miguel Leonardo Caceres	UD	8 (8)	2 Sep 2011	Gimnasio Español, Osorno, Chile	
23	Win	14–9	Daniel Alberto Dorrego	TKO	2 (12)	27 May 2011	Gimnasio Municipal, Pergamino, Argentina	
22	Loss	13–9	Oscar Bravo	UD	8 (8)	10 Dec 2010	Gimnasio Club México, Santiago, Chile	
21	Win	13–8	Hector Medina	DQ	7 (8)	11 Jun 2010	Gimnasio Club México, Osorno, Chile	
20	Loss	12–8	Domingo Andino Vilpan	UD	10 (10)	18 Sep 2009	Estadio Pedro Estremador, Bariloche, Argentina	
19	Win	12–7	Carlos Narvaez	TKO	5 (10)	20 Feb 2009	Gimnasio Liceo Eleuterio Ramírez, Osorno, Chile	Won vacant Chilean lightweight title
18	Loss	11–7	Jonathan Victor Barros	TKO	3 (10)	12 Sep 2008	Polideportivo Carlos Magalot, Río Grande, Argentina	
17	Loss	11–6	Eduardo Daniel Roman	UD	12 (12)	1 Dec 2007	Club Basquetbol Córdoba, Corrientes, Argentina	For WBC Latino lightweight title
16	Loss	11–5	Roberto David Arrieta	KO	8 (10)	1 Sep 2007	Bernasconi, La Pampa, Argentina	
15	Loss	11–4	Cristian Palma	UD	10 (10)	21 Apr 2007	Gimnasio El Toqui, Lautaro, Chile	Lost Chilean featherweight title
14	Loss	11–3	Fernando David Saucedo	KO	2 (6)	20 Jan 2007	Polideportivo Municipal, Monte Hermoso, Argentina	
13	Win	11–2	Cristian Palma	KO	6 (6)	10 Nov 2006	Gimnasio Club México, Osorno, Chile	
12	Win	10–2	Sergio Daniel Ledesma	UD	8 (8)	30 Jun 2006	Gimnasio Español, Osorno, Chile	
11	Win	9–2	Diego Jose Reimundo Hernandez	UD	8 (8)	12 May 2006	Gimnasio Club México, Osorno, Chile	
10	Loss	8–2	Olivier Lontchi	UD	8 (8)	25 Feb 2006	Casino du Lac-Leamy, Gatineau, Quebec, Canada	
9	Win	8–1	Juan Nahuel	TKO	3 (10)	25 Nov 2005	Gimnasio Español, Osorno, Chile	Won vacant Chilean featherweight title
8	Win	7–1	Marcos Valdez	UD	8 (8)	28 Oct 2005	Gimnasio Club México, Osorno, Chile	
7	Win	6–1	Carlos Narvaez	UD	8 (8)	26 Aug 2005	Gimnasio Club México, Osorno, Chile	
6	Win	5–1	Mario Alberto Quintuman	TKO	4 (8)	24 Jun 2005	Gimnasio Club México, Osorno, Chile	
5	Win	4–1	Horacio Alfredo Basualdo	KO	2 (8)	29 Apr 2005	Gimnasio Club México, Osorno, Chile	
4	Win	3–1	Hugo Martinez	UD	6 (6)	20 Nov 2004	Gimnasio Municipal, Santa María, Chile	
3	Loss	2–1	Moises Gutierrez	MD	6 (6)	10 Sep 2004	Gimnasio Español, Osorno, Chile	
2	Win	2–0	Hugo Martinez	TKO	5 (6)	6 Aug 2004	Gimnasio Club México, Osorno, Chile	
1	Win	1–0	Ramon Garrido	TKO	1 (6)	2 Jul 2004	Gimnasio Español, Osorno, Chile	
