= Miguel Román (boxer) =

Mexican boxer (born 1985)

Personal information
- Nickname: Mickey
- Born: Luis Miguel Román Portillo; 14 November 1985 (age 41) Ciudad Juarez, Chihuahua, Mexico
- Height: 5 ft 5 in (165 cm)
- Weight: Super bantamweight; Featherweight; Super featherweight; Lightweight

Boxing career
- Reach: 67 in (170 cm)
- Stance: Orthodox

Boxing record
- Total fights: 87
- Wins: 71
- Win by KO: 51
- Losses: 15
- Draws: 0
- No contests: 1

Miguel Román (born 14 November 1985) is a Mexican professional boxer.

== Professional career ==
On 12 March 2011, he lost to Jonathan Victor Barros for the WBA Featherweight belt.

On 28 January 2017, in a Fight-of-the-Year candidate he had his 18 fight win streak snapped by Takashi Miura in a title eliminator for the WBC super featherweight title. He was knocked out in the 12th round of the fight.

On 9 December 2017, Miguel faced fellow battle hardened Mexican warrior Orlando Salido. Roman dropped Salido three times — in Rounds 4, 8 and 9 — en route to a ninth-round mercy stoppage by referee Robert Byrd. However, right up until the end came at 1:43 of Round 9, the 37-year-old war horse gave as good as he got in the kind of back-and-forth slugfest that he has become known for.

On 3 November 2018, Roman challenged Miguel Berchelt for his WBC super featherweight belt, in what was Berchelt's third title defense. Roman was at the top of his game throughout the fight, but just wasn't able to match Berchelt's size, power and skill. Berchelt dropped Roman three times throughout the fight, but despite that Roman kept going forward, even taunting Berchet at one point to come forward. However, in the ninth round, after the third time Vazquez was dropped, the referee had seen enough and the fight was stopped.

He bounced back from the loss by defeating Ramiro Blanco via a twelve-round unanimous decision.

In his next fight, Roman faced fellow Mexican Tomas Rojas. In a very entertaining and fast-paced fight, both fighters didn't take a step back and gave the fans a real show. Roman was aggressive and hurting Rojas throughout the fight, but Rojas did his fair share of damage on Roman too. In the end, Roman's aggression was sufficient for all three judges to name him the winner, 117–111, 117-112 and 116–112.

== Professional boxing record ==
87 fights	71 wins	15 losses
By knockout	51	5
By decision	19	10
By disqualification	1	0
No contests	1	

No.	Result	Record	Opponent	Type	Round, time	Date	Location	Notes
87	Loss	71–15 (1)	(Mexico) Mauricio Lara	TKO	1 (10), 2:05	18 October 2025	Gimnasio Universitario de la Universidad Autónoma de Ciudad Juárez, Ciudad Juarez, Chihuahua, Mexico	
86	Win	71–14 (1)	(Colombia) Óscar Escandón	TKO	5 (10), 2:58	11 April 2025	Malecón de Guaymas, Guaymas, Sonora, Mexico	
85	Win	70–14 (1)	(South Africa) Tshifhiwa Munyai	UD	10	8 November 2024	Gimnasio Municipal "Jose Neri Santos", Ciudad Juarez, Chihuahua, Mexico	
85	Win	69–14 (1)	(Argentina) Nestor Adrian Maidana	TKO	6 (10), 2:25	7 June 2024	Plaza de la Mexicanidad, Ciudad Juarez, Chihuahua, Mexico	
83	Win	68–14 (1)	(Japan) Takuya Watanabe	UD	10	8 March 2024	Gimnasio Municipal "Jose Neri Santos", Ciudad Juarez, Chihuahua, Mexico	
82	Win	67–14 (1)	(Argentina) Alexis Nahuel Torres	UD	10	8 December 2023	Gimnasio Municipal "Jose Neri Santos", Ciudad Juarez, Chihuahua, Mexico	
81	Win	66–14 (1)	(Argentina) Carlos Daniel Cordoba	UD	10	1 September 2023	Gimnasio Municipal "Jose Neri Santos", Ciudad Juarez, Chihuahua, Mexico	
80	NC	65–14 (1)	(Mexico) Jorge Mata Cuellar	NC	2 (10)	28 April 2023	Gimnasio Municipal "Jose Neri Santos", Ciudad Juarez, Chihuahua, Mexico	Unintentional headbutt and the fight is declared a no contest
79	Win	65–14	(Colombia) Darvin Galeano	TKO	8 (10), 2:08	15 December 2022	Gimnasio Municipal "Jose Neri Santos", Ciudad Juarez, Chihuahua, Mexico	
78	Win	64–14	(Nicaragua) Marcio Soza	UD	10	27 August 2022	Plaza de la Mexicanidad, Ciudad Juarez, Chihuahua, Mexico	Won vacant WBC International Silver super featherweight title
77	Win	63–14	(Mexico) Sergio Puente	TKO	4 (8), 1:59	27 August 2021	Gimnasio Municipal "Jose Neri Santos", Ciudad Juarez, Chihuahua, Mexico	
76	Loss	62–14	(United States) O'Shaquie Foster	KO	9 (10), 0:58	19 November 2020	(United States) Wild Card Boxing, Los Angeles, California, U.S.	For WBC Silver super featherweight title
75	Win	62–13	(Mexico) Tomás Rojas	UD	12	7 September 2019	Gimnasio Municipal "Jose Neri Santos", Ciudad Juarez, Chihuahua, Mexico	
74	Win	61–13	(Nicaragua) Ramiro Blanco	UD	12	23 March 2019	Gimnasio Municipal "Jose Neri Santos", Ciudad Juarez, Chihuahua, Mexico	
73	Loss	60–13	(Mexico) Miguel Berchelt	TKO	9 (12), 2:58	3 November 2018	(United States) Don Haskins Center, El Paso, Texas, U.S.	For WBC super featherweight title
72	Win	60–12	(Venezuela) Michel Marcano	KO	2 (12), 1:35	23 June 2018	Fería de Juárez, Ciudad Juarez, Chihuahua, Mexico	
71	Win	59–12	(Colombia) Aristides Pérez	KO	4 (10), 2:36	10 February 2018	Gimnasio Municipal "Jose Neri Santos", Ciudad Juarez, Chihuahua, Mexico	
70	Win	58–12	(Mexico) Orlando Salido	TKO	9 (10), 1:43	9 December 2017	(United States) Mandalay Bay Events Center, Paradise, Nevada, U.S.	
69	Win	57–12	(Mexico) Nery Saguilán	TKO	12 (12), 1:10	24 June 2017	Gimnasio Municipal "Jose Neri Santos", Ciudad Juarez, Chihuahua, Mexico	
68	Loss	56–12	(Japan) Takashi Miura	KO	12 (12), 0:53	28 January 2017	(United States) Fantasy Springs Casino, Indio, California, U.S.	
67	Win	56–11	(Philippines) Jerope Mercado	TKO	3 (10), 1:10	9 July 2016	Arena José Sulaimán, Monterrey, Nuevo León, Mexico	
66	Win	55–11	(Spain) Juli Giner	TKO	8 (12), 0:29	1 April 2016	Pabellón de la Vall d'Hebron, Barcelona, Cataluña, Spain	
65	Win	54–11	(Colombia) Yogli Herrera	RTD	3 (10), 3:00	30 January 2016	Hotel Ixtapa Azul, Zihuatanejo, Guerrero, Mexico	
64	Win	53–11	(Ghana) Samuel Amoako	KO	2 (12), 1:24	7 November 2015	Gran Estadio, Hidalgo Del Parral, Chihuahua, Mexico	
63	Win	52–11	(Philippines) Leonardo Doronio	KO	3 (8), 2:46	22 August 2015	Gimnasio Municipal "Jose Neri Santos", Ciudad Juarez, Chihuahua, Mexico	
62	Win	51–11	(United States) David Martinez	TKO	3 (6), 0:49	11 July 2015	(United States) Buchanan Event Center, El Paso, Texas, U.S.	
61	Win	50–11	(Mexico) Edgar Puerta	UD	10	25 April 2015	Arena Coliseo, Mexico City, Distrito Federal, Mexico	
60	Win	49–11	(Mexico) Adrian Verdugo	DQ	6 (10), 1:22	14 February 2015	Centro de Usos Multiples, Los Mochis, Sinaloa, Mexico	Verdugo disqualified when he comes in with his head down for the third time in the round
59	Win	48–11	(Mexico) Ricardo Castillo	TKO	3 (10), 1:32	6 December 2014	Arena José Sulaimán, Monterrey, Nuevo León, Mexico	
58	Win	47–11	(Mexico) Juan Jose Farias	TKO	3 (10), 1:55	6 September 2014	Gimnasio Miguel Hidalgo, Puebla, Puebla, Mexico	
57	Win	46–11	(Mexico) Daniel Ponce de León	TKO	9 (10), 1:50	7 June 2014	Estadio de Beisbol, Ciudad Cuauhtemoc, Chihuahua, Mexico	Won vacant WBC-USNBC Silver super featherweight title
56	Win	45–11	(Mexico) Mario Enrique Tinoco	KO	3 (10), 2:56	22 February 2014	Gimnasio Miguel Hidalgo, Puebla, Puebla, Mexico	
55	Win	44–11	(Mexico) Juan Salgado Zambrano	TKO	11 (12), 1:42	9 November 2013	Convention Center Surman Villa de las Flores, Coacalco, México, Mexico	Won vacant WBC International Silver lightweight title
54	Win	43–11	(Mexico) Carlos Urias Guerena	KO	1 (10), 0:42	5 October 2013	Gimnasio Manuel Bernardo Aguirre, Chihuahua, Chihuahua, Mexico	
53	Win	42–11	(Mexico) Diego Ledesma	KO	2 (10), 0:36	29 June 2013	Gimnasio Municipal "Jose Neri Santos", Ciudad Juarez, Chihuahua, Mexico	
52	Win	41–11	(Mexico) Rafael Urias	KO	5 (10)	24 May 2013	Arena California, La Paz, Baja California Sur, Mexico	
51	Win	40–11	(Mexico) Miguel Angel Mungiia	UD	8	9 March 2013	(United States) The Hangar, Costa Mesa, California, U.S.	
50	Win	39–11	(Mexico) Alejandro Barrera	TKO	2 (10), 2:21	19 January 2013	Arena Jalisco, Guadalajara, Jalisco, Mexico	
49	Loss	38–11	(Mexico) Dante Jardón	UD	12	13 October 2012	Palacio de los Deportes, Mexico City, Distrito Federal, Mexico	For vacant WBC Continental Americas super featherweight title
48	Win	38–10	(Mexico) Dante Jardón	SD	10	28 July 2012	Domo De Le Feria, Leon, Guanajuato, Mexico	
47	Loss	37–10	(Mexico) Antonio DeMarco	KO	5 (12), 2:59	17 March 2012	Polideportivo Centenario, Los Mochis, Sinaloa, Mexico	For WBC lightweight title
46	Loss	37–9	(Dominican Republic) Javier Fortuna	UD	10	16 December 2011	(United States) Mandalay Bay, Islander Ballroom, Paradise Nevada, U.S.	
45	Win	37–8	(Mexico) Pedro Navarrete	UD	10	5 November 2011	Domo De La Feria, Leon, Guanajuato, Mexico	
44	Win	36–8	(Mexico) Antonio Meza	KO	1 (10), 2:09	15 September 2011	(United States) County Coliseum, El Paso, Texas, U.S.	
43	Win	35–8	(Mexico) Abraham Rodriguez	TKO	7 (12), 2:34	13 August 2011	Centro Internacional Acapulco, Acapulco, Guerrero, Mexico	
42	Win	34–8	(Mexico) Hugo Salas	TKO	7 (12), 0:44	30 April 2011	Estadio de Beisbol Domingo Santana, Leon, Guanajuato, Mexico	
41	Loss	33–8	(Argentina) Jonathan Victor Barros	UD	12	12 March 2011	Polideportivo La Colonia, Junin, Mendoza, Argentina	For WBA (Regular) featherweight title
40	Win	33–7	(Colombia) Angel Antonio Priolo	TKO	1 (10), 2:25	1 January 2011	Auditorio Centenario, Torreon, Coahuila, Mexico	
39	Win	32–7	(Philippines) Joan de Guia	KO	1 (12), 1:16	30 October 2010	Gimnasio Rodrigo M. Quevedo, Chihuahua, Chihuahua, Mexico	
38	Win	31–7	(United States) Tyron Harris	KO	5 (12), 2:03	15 September 2010	(United States) Hilton Hotel, Paradise, Nevada, U.S.	IBO super featherweight title eliminator; No. 1 spot only at stake for harris as Roman came in overweight
37	Win	30–7	(Mexico) Juan Flores Salazar	KO	1 (8)	12 June 2010	Auditorio Centenario, Gomez Palacio, Durango, Mexico	
36	Win	29–7	(Mexico) Daniel Armando Valenzuela	TKO	3 (12), 1:17	29 May 2010	Auditorio Municipal "Jose Neri Santos", Ciudad Juarez, Chihuahua, Mexico	
35	Loss	28–7	(Mexico) Antonio Escalante	UD	10	26 February 2010	(United States) Don Haskins Center, El Paso, Texas, U.S.	
34	Loss	28–6	(Mexico) Miguel Beltrán Jr.	SD	10	18 December 2009	Auditorio Municipal, Tijuana, Baja California, Mexico	
33	Win	28–5	(Mexico) Daniel Ruiz	TKO	5 (8), 1:10	19 November 2009	Restaurante Arroyo, Mexico City, Distrito Federal, Mexico	
32	Win	27–5	(Mexico) Andres Romero	RTD	5 (6), 3:00	20 October 2009	Restaurante Arroyo, Mexico City, Distrito Federal, Mexico	
31	Win	26–5	(Mexico) Servando Solis Nevarez	KO	1 (8)	5 September 2009	Gimnasio Rodrigo M. Quevedo, Chihuahua, Chihuahua, Mexico	
30	Loss	25–5	(Mexico) Fernando Beltrán Jr.	SD	12	20 March 2009	(United States) Laredo Entertainment Center, Laredo, Texas, U.S.	For vacant IBF Latino featherweight title
29	Loss	25–4	(Mexico) Eduardo Escobedo	UD	10	20 September 2008	Arena Coliseo, Monterrey, Nuevo Leon, Mexico	
28	Loss	25–3	(Mexico) Jorge Solís	UD	10	17 May 2008	Plaza Monumental, Aguascalientes, Aguascalientes, Mexico	
27	Win	25–2	(Mexico) Giovanny Urbina	KO	3 (10), 1:50	29 March 2008	Gimnasio Municipal "Jose Neri Santos", Ciudad Juarez, Chihuahua, Mexico	
26	Win	24–2	(Mexico) Fermin de los Santos	UD	10	29 February 2008	Gimnasio Rodrigo M. Quevedo, Chihuahua, Chihuahua, Mexico	
25	Loss	23–2	(Mexico) Genaro García	UD	12	14 December 2007	Poliforo Juan Gabriel, Ciudad Juarez, Chihuahua, Mexico	
24	Win	23–1	(Mexico) Arturo Murillo	UD	10	29 September 2007	Gimnasio Rodrigo M. Quevedo, Chihuahua, Chihuahua, Mexico	Won vacant Mexican super bantamweight title
23	Loss	22–1	(Philippines) Michael Domingo	UD	6	11 August 2007	(United States) Arco Arena, Sacramento, California, U.S.	
22	Win	22–0	(Mexico) Jose Alfonso Moreno	TKO	5 (10), 1:29	30 June 2007	(Mexico) Don Haskins Center, El Paso, Texas, U.S.	
21	Win	21–0	(Mexico) Cuauhtemoc Gomez	RTD	6 (10), 3:00	28 April 2007	Gimnasio Rodrigo M. Quevedo, Chihuahua, Chihuahua, Mexico	
20	Win	20–0	(Mexico) Oscar Arciniega	KO	2 (10)	3 March 2007	Gimnasio Rodrigo M. Quevedo, Chihuahua, Chihuahua, Mexico	
19	Win	19–0	(Mexico) César Soto	UD	10	8 December 2006	Poliforo Juan Gabriel, Ciudad Juarez, Chihuahua, Mexico	
18	Win	18–0	(Colombia) Andrés Ledesma	KO	3 (10), 2:59	21 October 2006	(United States) Don Haskins Center, El Paso, Texas, U.S.	
17	Win	17–0	(Mexico) César Soto	SD	10	4 August 2006	Poliforo Juan Gabriel, Ciudad Juarez, Chihuahua, Mexico	
16	Win	16–0	(Mexico) Raul Juarez	KO	1 (10), 0:38	19 May 2006	Poliforo Juan Gabriel, Ciudad Juarez, Chihuahua, Mexico	
15	Win	15–0	(Mexico) Cuauhtemoc Gomez	RTD	7 (10), 3:00	10 March 2006	Poliforo Juan Gabriel, Ciudad Juarez, Chihuahua, Mexico	
14	Win	14–0	(United States) Phillip Payne	TKO	9 (10), 1:25	16 December 2005	Poliforo Juan Gabriel, Ciudad Juarez, Chihuahua, Mexico	
13	Win	13–0	(Philippines) Reman Salim	KO	4 (10), 2:59	14 October 2005	Poliforo Juan Gabriel, Ciudad Juarez, Chihuahua, Mexico	Retained WBC Youth super bantamweight title
12	Win	12–0	(Mexico) Francisco Mateos	SD	10	5 August 2005	Ciudad Juarez, Chihuahua, Mexico	
11	Win	11–0	(Mexico) Oscar Arciniega	TKO	5 (10), 2:40	27 May 2005	Poliforo Juan Gabriel, Ciudad Juarez, Chihuahua, Mexico	
10	Win	10–0	(Thailand) Kosol Sor Vorapin	KO	5 (10), 2:00	18 March 2005	Poliforo Juan Gabriel, Ciudad Juarez, Chiahuahua, Mexico	Won vacant WBC Youth super bantamweight title
9	Win	9–0	(Mexico) Cuauhtemoc Gomez	TKO	10 (10), 1:38	3 December 2004	Poliforo Juan Gabriel, Ciudad Juarez, Chihuahua, Mexico	
8	Win	8–0	(Mexico) David Murillo	TKO	9 (10), 0:55	22 October 2004	Poliforo Juan Gabriel, Ciudad Juarez, Chihuahua, Mexico	
7	Win	7–0	(Mexico) Pedro Davila	PTS	6	17 July 2004	(United States) Sky Ute Casino, Ignacio, Colorado, U.S.	
6	Win	6–0	(United States) Angelo Luis Torres	PTS	4	3 June 2004	(United States) Chinook Winds Casino, Lincoln City, Oregon, U.S.	
5	Win	5–0	(Mexico) Oscar Olivas	RTD	4 (8), 3:00	27 February 2004	Poliforo Juan Gabriel, Ciudad Juarez, Chihuahua, Mexico	Olivas claiming a broken right hand
4	Win	4–0	(Mexico) Roberto Soriano	KO	1 (4)	5 December 2003	Centro de Espectaculos Amazonas, Ciudad Juarez, Chihuahua, Mexico	
3	Win	3–0	(Mexico) Hector Cervantes Soriano	UD	6	10 October 2003	Poliforo Juan Gabriel, Ciudad Juarez, Chihuahua, Mexico	
2	Win	2–0	(Mexico) Ernesto Rivera	TKO	3 (4)	13 June 2003	Plaza de Toros, Ciudad Juarez, Chihuahua, Mexico	
1	Win	1–0	(Mexico) Miguel Caddie	TKO	4 (4), 0:49	28 March 2003	Poliforo Juan Gabriel, Ciudad Juarez Chihuahua, Mexico	
