= Dante Jardón =

Mexican boxer

Personal information
- Nickname: Crazy
- Born: 20 December 1988 (age 37) Mexico City, Mexico
- Height: 1.73 m (5 ft 8 in)
- Weight: Super featherweight

Boxing career
- Reach: 173 cm (68 in)
- Stance: Counterpuncher

Boxing record
- Total fights: 44
- Wins: 35
- Win by KO: 25
- Losses: 9
- Draws: 0
- No contests: 0

Dante Jardón (born 20 December 1988) is a Mexican professional boxer who challenged for the WBC super featherweight title in 2013.

== Early life ==
Before becoming a boxer, Jardón was a member of Club Universidad Nacional's youth teams.

== Professional career ==
=== Jardon vs. Ramirez ===
His first loss came by first-round technical knockout (TKO) to Tomas Ramírez. He won the rematch by third-round TKO

=== Jardon vs. Palma ===
After his win over Colombian Orlen Padilla, Dante was assaulted at gunpoint and shot in his left arm. He made his comeback by stopping in just two rounds José Palma.

=== Jardon vs. Rodela ===
On 26 March 2010 Jardón beat veteran David Rodela by 3rd round TKO.

=== Jarodn vs. Tamakoshi ===
On 10 December 2011 Jardón suffered an upsetting third-round KO defeat to Kyohei Tamakoshi, in what was supposed to be an stay-active fight.

=== Jardon vs. Tomlinson ===
On 27 August 2021, Jardon fought and defeated Anthony Tomlinson by knockout in the 9th round at the Ponds Forge Arena in Yorkshire.

== Professional record ==
26 Wins (21 knockouts), 5 Losses (3 knockouts), 0 Draw
Res.	Record	Opponent	Type	Rd., Time	Date	Location	Notes
Win	26-5-0	(Philippines) Jeffrey Arienza	TKO	6 (2:36)	25 April 2015	Arena Coliseo, Mexico City, Mexico	Won WBC International Silver lightweight title
Win	25-5-0	(Mexico) Patricio Moreno	UD	10	31 January 2015	Arena Coliseo, Mexico City, Mexico	Won WBC FECOMBOX lightweight title
Loss	24-5-0	(Mexico) Adrian Estrella	UD	12	5 July 2014	Domo Care, Guadalupe, Nuevo León, Mexico	For WBC FECARBOX super featherweight title
Loss	24-4-0	(Japan) Takashi Miura	TKO	9 (0:55)	31 December 2013	Ota-City General Gymnasium, Tokyo, Japan	For WBC super featherweight title
Win	24-3-0	(Mexico) Gamaliel Díaz	TKO	8 (0:52)	10 August 2013	Auditorio Plaza Condesa, Mexico City, Mexico	Retained WBC Continental Americas super featherweight title
Win	23-3-0	(Japan) Akinori Kanai	TKO	8 (2:23)	27 April 2013	Arena Mexico, Mexico City, Mexico	Retained WBC Continental Americas super featherweight title
Win	22-3-0	(Mexico) Adrian Verdugo	DQ	2 (2:06)	12 January 2013	Foro Polanco, Mexico City, Mexico	Retained WBC Continental Americas super featherweight title
Win	21-3-0	(Mexico) Miguel Roman	UD	12	13 October 2012	Palacio de Deporte, Mexico City, Mexico	Won WBC Continental Americas super featherweight title
Loss	20-3-0	(Mexico) Miguel Roman	SD	10	28 July 2012	Domo De La Feria, León, Guanajuato, Mexico	
Win	20-2-0	(Argentina) Berman Sanchez	RTD	7 (0:10)	7 April 2012	Oasis Hotel Complex, Cancún, Mexico	
Loss	19-2-0	(Japan) Kyohei Tamakoshi	KO	3 (1:41)	10 December 2011	Centro Expositor, Puebla, Puebla, Mexico	Lost WBC Youth super featherweight title
Win	19-1-0	(Philippines) Ricky Sismundo	KO	7 (2:57)	24 September 2011	Plaza de Toros, Juriquilla, Querétaro, Mexico	Retained WBC Youth super featherweight title
Win	18-1-0	(Mexico) Adrian Tellez	KO	2 (1:27)	29 July 2011	Cuervo Salon, Mexico City, Mexico	Retained WBC Youth super featherweight title
Win	17-1-0	(Argentina) Claudio Rosendo	TKO	3 (2:59)	4 June 2011	Foro Polanco, Mexico City, Mexico	Retained interim WBC Latino and WBO Latino super featherweight titles
Win	16-1-0	(Colombia) Humberto Martínez	TKO	1 (1:44)	18 March 2011	Cuervo Salon, Mexico City, Mexico	Won interim WBC Latino and WBO Latino super featherweight titles
Win	15-1-0	(Nicaragua) René González	UD	10 (10)	15 January 2011	Cuervo Salon, Mexico City, Mexico	Retained WBC Youth super featherweight title
Win	14-1-0	(Colombia) José Palma	DQ	2 (0:10)	25 September 2010	Cuervo Salon, Mexico City, Mexico	Retained WBC Youth super featherweight title
Win	13-1-0	(Colombia) Orlen Padílla	KO	1 (1:42)	8 May 2010	Plaza Condesa, Mexico City, Mexico	Retained WBC Youth super featherweight title
Win	12-1-0	(United States) David Rodela	TKO	3 (0:11)	26 March 2010	Auditorio Plaza Condesa, Mexico City, Mexico	Retained WBC Youth super featherweight title
Win	11-1-0	(Mexico) Adalberto Borquez	KO	2 (0:08)	19 December 2009	Foro Scotiabank, Mexico City, Mexico	Won WBC Youth super featherweight title
Win	10-1-0	(Mexico) Isaac Bejarano	TKO	1 (0:22)	30 September 2009	Auditorio Plaza Condesa, Mexico City, Mexico	
Win	9-1-0	(Mexico) Luis Pérez	TKO	4 (1:33)	24 June 2009	Foro Scotiabank, Mexico City, Mexico	
