= Fantasy Springs Resort Casino =

Casino and hotel in Palm Springs, California

- Interactive map of Fantasy Springs Resort Casino
- Location: 84245 Indio Springs Drive Indio, CA 92203 USA; 33.7209°N 116.1941°W
- Opened: December 21, 2004
- No. of rooms: 250
- Signature attractions: Special Events Center; Rock Yard Music; Fantasy Lanes; Eagle Falls Golf Course; Nautilus Fitness Center
- Casino type: Indian Casino
- Owner: Cabazon Band of Cahuilla Indians
- Architect: CallisonRTKL Inc.
- Renovated in: 2004
- Website: www.fantasyspringsresort.com

Fantasy Springs Resort Casino is a casino and hotel located southeast of Palm Springs near I-10 in Indio, California. It is owned and operated by the Cabazon Band of Cahuilla Indians, a federally recognized tribe. The hotel has 250 rooms and the casino consists of 1800 slot machines and video poker, 40 tables and 100,000 sq ft (9,300 m^{2}) of special events center space.

== History ==
The Indio Bingo Palace opened in 1991. In 1995, the Indio Bingo Palace closed and became the Fantasy Springs Casino. In October 2000, the casino underwent an expansion of its casino space.

In July 2003, Fantasy Springs Casino broke ground on a $145 million resort and a 97,000 square foot conference center.

The Fantasy Springs Hotel and Casino opened on December 21, 2004 by $200 million refurbishment. The property was designed by CallisonRTKL Inc. (Previously RTKL Associates Inc.)

In late April 2007, the 18-hole Eagle Falls Golf Course at Fantasy Springs opened to the public.

Fantasy Springs was a filming location for the 2014 film Welcome to Me starring Kristen Wiig.

== Dining ==
- The Bistro
- JOY Asian Cuisine
- POM
- The Fresh Grill Buffet
- The Pizza Kitchen
- Starbucks Coffee
- Lique
- LIT
- 12th Floor Cocktail Lounge & Wine Bar
- Rocky Mountain Chocolate Factory

== Amenities ==
- Swimming Pool (103-foot heated outdoor pool, open 6am-10pm for registered guests only)
- Hot tub/jacuzzi (seats 10-12 people)
- Private cabanas by the pool
- Poolside bar
- Special Events Center
- Rock Yard Music (Fridays and Saturdays)
- Fantasy Lanes (bowling alley)
- Eagle Falls Golf Course
- Nautilus Fitness Center
- In-room massage services (by reservation)
- Free valet and self-parking
- Express check-in/check-out
- Concierge services
- Business center with meeting facilities
- Laundry/dry cleaning services
- Gift shops and newsstands
- ATM
- Free Wi-Fi

=== Hotel Room Features ===
The 12-story hotel features 250 four-star caliber rooms with 32-inch LCD TVs, refrigerators, dining tables, coffee/tea makers, electric kettles, laptop-compatible in-room safes, hypo-allergenic bedding, blackout curtains, premium TV channels, and private bathrooms with shower/bath combinations, free toiletries, and hairdryers.
