= Mercito Gesta =

Filipino boxer

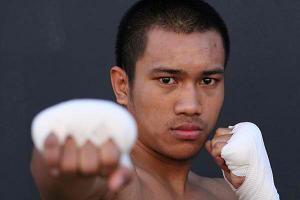

Personal information
- Nicknames: No Mercy; Guerrero
- Nationality: Filipino
- Born: 12 October 1987 (age 38) Labogon, Mandaue, Philippines
- Height: 5 ft 7 in (170 cm)

Boxing career
- Weight class: Lightweight; Light-welterweight
- Reach: 68 in (173 cm)
- Stance: Southpaw

Boxing record
- Total fights: 41
- Wins: 34
- Win by KO: 17
- Losses: 4
- Draws: 3

Mercito Moya Gesta (pronounced hes-ta, born 12 October 1987) is a Filipino professional boxer who challenged for the IBF lightweight title in 2012 and the WBA lightweight title in 2018. At regional level he held the WBO-NABO lightweight title in 2018.

Gesta began his professional career on 19 October 2003, with a unanimous decision win over Edwin Picardal.

== Professional career ==
=== lightweight ===
==== Gesta vs. Vázquez ====
Mercito Gesta vs. Miguel Vázquez was on the undercard of Manny Pacquiao vs. Juan Manuel Márquez IV on 8 December 2012. This fight was for the IBF lightweight title. On fight night Gesta was out boxed and outclassed by Vázquez and lost by unanimous decision. The score totals for this fight were 119–109, 118–110, and 117–111.

==== Gesta vs. Diaz ====
Gesta was scheduled to fight former IBF super featherweight champion Jojo Diaz on March 18, 2023, on Walter Pyramid, Long Beach, California. Gesta vs Diaz had been scheduled for the co-feature spot, but after light heavyweight contender Gilberto Ramirez came in overweight for his main event fight against Gabe Rosado, the fight was canceled, and the Diaz vs. Gesta fight moved to the headliner slot. The day of the fight Mercito Gesta defeats Joseph Diaz by 10 Round Split Decision the judges’ scores were 99–91, 98–92 for Gesta, and 97–93 for Diaz.

== Professional boxing record ==
41 fights	34 wins	4 losses
By knockout	17	2
By decision	17	2
Draws	3	

No.	Result	Record	Opponent	Type	Round, time	Date	Location	Notes
41	Loss	34–4–3	William Zepeda	TKO	6 (12), 1:31	16 Sep 2023	Commerce Casino, Commerce, California, US	For WBA Continental Americas lightweight title
40	Win	34–3–3	Joseph Diaz Jr.	SD	10	18 Mar 2023	Walter Pyramid, Long Beach, California, US	
39	Win	33–3–3	Joel Diaz Jr.	UD	10	21 Apr 2022	Fantasy Springs Resort Casino, Indio, California, US	
38	Draw	32–3–3	Carlos Morales	TD	6 (10), 3:00	14 Nov 2019	Belasco Theater, Los Angeles, California, US	
37	Loss	32–3–2	Juan Antonio Rodriguez	KO	9 (10), 2:55	21 Mar 2019	The Avalon, Los Angeles, California, US	
36	Win	32–2–2	Robert Manzanarez	MD	10	14 Jun 2018	Fantasy Springs Resort Casino, Indio, California, US	Won vacant WBO-NABO lightweight title
35	Loss	31–2–2	Jorge Linares	UD	12	27 Jan 2018	The Forum, Inglewood, California, US	For WBA lightweight title
34	Win	31–1–2	Martin Honorio	KO	8 (10), 0:18	15 Jul 2017	The Forum, Inglewood, California, US	
33	Win	30–1–2	Gilberto Josué González	UD	10	1 Apr 2017	Cosmopolitan of Las Vegas, Paradise, Nevada, US	
32	Win	29–1–2	Miguel Mendoza	UD	10	3 Oct 2015	Stub Hub Center, Carson, California, US	
31	Draw	28–1–2	Carlos Molina	SD	10	30 Apr 2015	Fantasy Springs Resort Casino, Indio, California, US	
30	Win	28–1–1	Luis Arceo	RTD	7 (10), 3:00	18 Jul 2014	Longshoremen's Hall, San Francisco, California, US	
29	Win	27–1–1	Edgar Riovalle	TKO	8 (8), 0:47	11 Apr 2014	Del Mar Fairgrounds, San Diego, California, US	
28	Loss	26–1–1	Miguel Vázquez	UD	12	8 Dec 2012	MGM Grand Garden Arena, Paradise, Nevada, US	For IBF lightweight title
27	Win	26–0–1	Ty Barnett	TKO	9 (10), 2:59	3 Aug 2012	Texas Station Casino, Las Vegas, Nevada, US	
26	Win	25–0–1	Oscar Cuero	TKO	8 (10), 1:38	14 Apr 2012	Mandalay Bay Resort & Casino, Paradise, Nevada, US	
25	Win	24–0–1	Ricardo Dominguez	UD	10	11 Nov 2011	Mandalay Bay Resort & Casino, Paradise, Nevada, US	
24	Win	23–0–1	Manuel Pérez	UD	10	17 Sep 2011	BlueWater Resort & Casino, Parker, Arizona, US	
23	Win	22–0–1	Jorge Pimentel	KO	3 (8), 2:23	9 Jul 2011	Home Depot Center, Carson, California, US	
22	Win	21–0–1	Genaro Trazancos	RTD	3 (8), 3:00	18 Feb 2011	Longshoremen's Hall, San Francisco, California, US	
21	Win	20–0–1	Ivan Valle	TKO	2 (8), 0:26	22 Oct 2010	Four Points Sheraton Hotel, San Diego, California, US	
20	Win	19–0–1	Genaro Trazancos	KO	7 (8), 0:53	20 Aug 2010	Casino Del Sol, Tucson, Arizona, US	
19	Win	18–0–1	Oscar Meza	RTD	4 (12), 3:00	4 Jun 2010	A La Carte Event Pavilion, Tampa, Florida, US	Won vacant WBO-NABO youth lightweight title
18	Win	17–0–1	Cristian Favela	UD	8	25 Feb 2010	Four Points Sheraton Hotel, San Diego, California, US	
17	Win	16–0–1	Devarise Crayton	TKO	3 (8), 1:13	10 Jul 2009	Hard Rock Hotel, San Diego, California, US	
16	Win	15–0–1	Alain Hernandez	TKO	1 (8), 0:44	21 May 2009	Hard Rock Hotel, San Diego, California, US	
15	Win	14–0–1	Cristian Favela	UD	8	7 Nov 2008	Casino Del Sol, Tucson, Arizona, US	
14	Win	13–0–1	Benito Zepeda	KO	1 (6), 1:47	18 Apr 2008	Casino Del Sol, Tucson, Arizona, US	
13	Win	12–0–1	Carlos Vinan	TKO	4 (6), 1:20	4 Oct 2007	Hard Rock Hotel and Casino, Paradise, Nevada, US	
12	Win	11–0–1	Carlos Madrid	MD	6	4 Aug 2007	Allstate Arena, Rosemont, Illinois, US	
11	Win	10–0–1	Lee Escobido	TD	7 (10)	16 Dec 2005	Kidapawan City Gymnasium, Kidapawan, Philippines	
10	Draw	9–0–1	Rey Llagas	TD	2 (8), 2:11	5 Nov 2005	San Andres Civic & Sports Center, Manila, Philippines	Fight stopped after Gesta was cut from an accidental head clash
9	Win	9–0	Alex Guevarra	UD	10	25 Sep 2005	San Andres Gym, Manila, Philippines	
8	Win	8–0	Chris Dujali	UD	8	13 Aug 2005	Barangay Alabang Junction, Muntinlupa, Philippines	
7	Win	7–0	Roldan Malinao	KO	2 (8),	12 Jun 2005	Liloan Sports Complex, Liloan, Philippines	
6	Win	6–0	Edwin Picardal	RTD	5 (6), 3:00	10 Dec 2004	Elorde Sports Center, Parañaque, Philippines	
5	Win	5–0	Sherwin Daguhoy	MD	6	21 May 2004	NBC Tent, Taguig, Philippines	
4	Win	4–0	Sherwin Daguhoy	UD	6	18 Apr 2004	Pusok Sports Complex, Lapu-Lapu, Philippines	
3	Win	3–0	Renato Nival	MD	4	25 Mar 2004	Joe Cantada Sports Center, Taguig, Philippines	
2	Win	2–0	Terry Tayao	TKO	1 (4), 2:25	7 Feb 2004	Joe Cantada Boxing Arena, Taguig, Philippines	
1	Win	1–0	Edwin Picardal	UD	4	19 Oct 2003	Joe Cantada Boxing Arena, Taguig, Philippines	

== Titles in boxing ==
Regional Title(s):

- WBO-NABO Youth lightweight title
- WBO-NABO lightweight title
