= Gamaliel Díaz =

Mexican boxer

Personal information
- Nickname: El Platano
- Born: Gamaliel Díaz Magaña; 14 February 1981 (age 45) Puerto Peñasco, Sonora, Mexico
- Height: 5 ft 8 1/2 in (174 cm)
- Weight: Featherweight; Super featherweight; Lightweight

Boxing career
- Reach: 68 1/2 in (174 cm)
- Stance: Orthodox

Boxing record
- Total fights: 63
- Wins: 40
- Win by KO: 19
- Losses: 20
- Draws: 3

Gamaliel Díaz Magaña (born 14 February 1981) is a Mexican professional boxer who held the WBC super featherweight title from 2012 to 2013.

== Professional career ==
In December 2005, Díaz upset the undefeated Mexican American future champion, Robert Guerrero, to win the NABF Featherweight Championship. He was defeated by Guerrero in a rematch by 6th-round knockout.

He defeated future champion Elio Rojas by split decision, handing the Dominican fighter his first loss, in a WBC Featherweight Title Eliminator. On December 15, 2007, he faced WBC Featherweight champion Jorge Linares, but was defeated by 8th-round knockout.

On October 11, 2008, Gamaliel lost to Interim WBC Super Featherweight Champion, Mexican Humberto Soto. The bout was at the Auditorio Centenario in Torreón, Coahuila, Mexico.

After scoring 13 consecutive victories, Diaz challenged WBC Super Featherweight champion Takahiro Ao in his hometown of Tokyo, on December 27, 2012. As an underdog, he defeated the Japanese champion in a 12-round unanimous decision to claim the title. Diaz lost the title in his first defense against Japanese boxer Takashi Miura.

== Professional boxing record ==
63 fights	40 wins	20 losses
By knockout	19	9
By decision	21	11
Draws	3	

No.	Result	Record	Opponent	Type	Round, time	Date	Location	Notes
63	Loss	40–20–3	Danielito Zorrilla	KO	2 (8)	2019-03-30	Fantasy Springs Resort Casino, Indio, California, U.S.	
62	Loss	40–19–3	Takahiro Ao	UD	8 (8)	2018-03-01	Ryōgoku Kokugikan, Tokyo, Japan	
61	Loss	40–18–3	Christian Gonzalez	UD	8 (8)	2017-10-06	Belasco Theater, Los Angeles, California, U.S.	
60	Loss	40–17–3	Damon Allen	TD	6 (8)	2017-06-30	Fantasy Springs Resort Casino, Indio, California, U.S.	
59	Loss	40–16–3	Robert Manzanarez	KO	4 (8)	2017-02-17	Belasco Theater, Los Angeles, California, U.S.	
58	Win	40–15–3	Manuel Valdez	TKO	6 (10)	2016-11-19	Auditorio Municipal, Villaflores, Mexico	
57	Loss	39–15–3	Vage Sarukhanyan	UD	10 (10)	2016-10-08	USC Soviet Wings, Moscow, Russia	
56	Loss	39–14–3	Tevin Farmer	UD	10 (10)	2016-03-30	BB King Blues Club & Grill, New York City, New York, U.S.	For NABF Super featherweight title
55	Loss	39–13–3	Emiliano Marsili	UD	12 (12)	2015-08-01	Stadio Comunale Cetorelli, Fiumicino, Italy	For vacant WBC Silver lightweight title
54	Loss	39–12–3	Petr Petrov	UD	10 (10)	2015-04-03	Omega Products International, Corona, California, U.S.	For NABO and NABA lightweight titles
53	Draw	39–11–3	Anthony Crolla	TD	3 (12)	2014-09-13	Phones 4u Arena, Manchester, England, U.K.	For WBO Inter-Continental lightweight title
52	Win	39–11–2	Jorge Canales Pulido	UD	12 (12)	2014-05-30	Centro de Convenciones IMSS, Tlalpan, Mexico	
51	Loss	38–11–2	Dante Jardón	KO	8 (12)	2013-08-10	Auditorio Plaza Condesa, Mexico City, Mexico	For WBC Continental Americas super-featherweight title
50	Loss	38–10–2	Takashi Miura	TKO	9 (12)	2013-04-08	Ryōgoku Kokugikan, Tokyo, Japan	Lost WBC super-featherweight title
49	Win	38–9–2	Takahiro Ao	UD	12 (12)	2012-10-27	International Forum, Tokyo, Japan	Won WBC super-featherweight title
48	Win	37–9–2	Moises Delgadillo	UD	12 (12)	2012-05-17	Expo Feria, Morelia, Mexico	
47	Win	36–9–2	John Carlo Aparicio	UD	10 (10)	2012-02-25	Arena México, Mexico City, Mexico	
46	Win	35–9–2	Adriel Jusaino Rios	TKO	2 (12)	2011-11-19	Sindicato de Trabajadores, Mexico City, Mexico	
45	Win	34–9–2	Abraham Gómez	UD	10 (10)	2011-07-30	Deportivo Trabajadores del Metro, Iztacalco, Mexico	
44	Win	33–9–2	Roberto Tamayo	TKO	3 (12)	2011-05-28	Foro Scotiabank, Polanco, Mexico	
43	Win	32–9–2	César Soto	UD	12 (12)	2011-04-09	Coliseum Don King, Texcoco de Mora, Mexico	
42	Win	31–9–2	Rafael Urias	TKO	3 (12)	2011-03-11	Jose Cuervo Salon, Polanco, Mexico	
41	Win	30–9–2	Rafael Falcon Estrella	TKO	2 (10)	2010-12-18	Palenque de la Feria, Celaya, Mexico	
40	Win	29–9–2	Pedro Navarrete	UD	12 (12)	2010-08-14	Hipódromo de las Américas, Mexico City, Mexico	
39	Win	28–9–2	Ismael González	TKO	10 (12)	2010-06-10	Jose Cuervo Salon, Polanco, Mexico	
38	Win	27–9–2	Eden Marquez	TKO	2 (12)	2010-03-13	Domo Deportivo Metropolitano, Ciudad Nezahualcóyotl, Mexico	
37	Win	26–9–2	Jorge Perez	UD	12 (12)	2010-01-23	Gimnasio Juan Fernández Albarrán, Zinacantepec, Mexico	
36	Win	25–9–2	Alirio Rivero	TKO	5 (12)	2009-06-13	Auditorio Municipal, Tijuana, Mexico	
35	Loss	24–9–2	Zolani Marali	UD	12 (12)	2009-04-02	Emperors Palace, Kempton Park, South Africa	For vacant IBO super-featherweight title
34	Loss	24–8–2	Humberto Soto	RTD	11 (12)	2008-10-11	Auditorio Centenario, Torreón, Mexico	For interim WBC super-featherweight title
33	Win	24–7–2	Juan Velasquez	TKO	4 (10)	2008-09-06	Grand Hotel, Tijuana, Mexico	
32	Win	23–7–2	Genaro Garcia Gutierrez	KO	1 (?)	2008-07-16	Mexico	
31	Loss	22–7–2	Jorge Linares	KO	8 (12)	2007-12-15	Plaza de Toros, Cancún, Mexico	For WBC featherweight title
30	Win	22–6–2	Elio Rojas	SD	10 (10)	2007-07-13	Auditorio Centenario, Gómez Palacio, Mexico	
29	Win	21–6–2	Ramon Mendez	SD	10 (10)	2007-02-03	Estadio Carlos Serdan, Veracruz, Mexico	
28	Loss	20–6–2	Robert Guerrero	KO	6 (12)	2006-06-23	Oakland Arena, Oakland, California, U.S.	Lost NABF featherweight title
27	Win	20–5–2	Robert Guerrero	SD	12 (12)	2005-12-02	Tachi Palace Hotel & Casino, Lemoore, California, U.S.	Won NABF featherweight title
26	Win	19–5–2	Makoto Uehara	TD	8 (10)	2005-07-29	Prefectural Gymnasium, Osaka, Japan	
25	Win	18–5–2	Naoto Fujiwara	TKO	9 (10)	2005-05-03	Orange Hall, Okayama, Japan	
24	Win	17–5–2	Gerardo Zayas	SD	10 (10)	2005-03-18	El Foro, Tijuana, Mexico	
23	Win	16–5–2	Sandro Marcos	UD	10 (10)	2005-01-07	El Foro, Tijuana, Mexico	
22	Win	15–5–2	Alfredo Guarneros	TKO	3 (12)	2004-11-18	El Jardín de la Malquerida, Metepec, Mexico	Retained WBC FECARBOX featherweight title
21	Win	14–5–2	Sergio Sanchez	UD	10 (10)	2004-09-24	Salon Las Pulgas, Tijuana, Mexico	
20	Win	13–5–2	Trino Cordoba	TKO	8 (12)	2004-07-08	Salon 21, Mexico City, Mexico	Retained WBC FECARBOX featherweight title
19	Win	12–5–2	Manuel Barreto	TKO	4 (12)	2004-05-27	Salon 21, Mexico City, Mexico	Retained WBC FECARBOX featherweight title
18	Win	11–5–2	Ismael González	MD	12 (12)	2004-02-21	Centro de Convenciones, Tlalnepantla de Baz, Mexico	Won WBC FECARBOX featherweight title
17	Win	10–5–2	Jorge Morua	KO	1 (?)	2003-12-06	Arena San Juan, Ciudad Nezahualcóyotl, Mexico	
16	Draw	9–5–2	Armando Hernandez	TD	3 (12)	2003-08-23	Salon La Maraka, Mexico City, Mexico	For vacant WBC FECARBOX featherweight title
15	Win	9–5–1	Isidro Vazquez	TKO	5 (12)	2003-06-14	Salon El Tapatío, Ecatepec de Morelos, Mexico	
14	Win	8–5–1	Armando Hernandez	SD	10 (10)	2002-11-23	Arena México, Mexico City, Mexico	
13	Win	7–5–1	Pedro Alejandro Olea	KO	7 (?)	2002-11-16	Ciudad Altamirano, Mexico	
12	Draw	6–5–1	Jose Luis Gaspar	PTS	8 (8)	2002-08-28	Arena Coliseo, Mexico City, Mexico	
11	Win	6–5	Aristeo Perez	TKO	5 (6)	2001-09-11	Salon 21, Mexico City, Mexico	
10	Win	5–5	Hugo Campos	TKO	1 (6)	2001-08-07	Salon 21, Mexico City, Mexico	
9	Win	4–5	Joaquin Ruiz Ramirez	UD	6 (6)	2001-07-03	Mexico City, Mexico	
8	Loss	3–5	Martin Honorio	TKO	3 (6)	2000-07-29	Mexico City, Mexico	
7	Loss	3–4	Juan Diaz	PTS	6 (6)	2000-04-05	Mexico City, Mexico	
6	Loss	3–3	Arturo Hernandez	PTS	6 (6)	2000-02-26	Mexico City, Mexico	
5	Loss	3–2	Francisco Dianzo	TKO	4 (6)	1999-09-15	Arena México, Mexico City, Mexico	
4	Win	3–1	Cesar Rivera	PTS	6 (6)	1999-07-14	Salon 21, Mexico City, Mexico	
3	Win	2–1	Raul Sandoval	PTS	4 (4)	1999-03-06	Mexico City, Mexico	
2	Win	1–1	Pedro Carbajal	PTS	4 (4)	1999-01-23	Mexico City, Mexico	
1	Loss	0–1	Luis Alberto Reyes	SD	4 (4)	1998-05-19	Discoteca La Boom, Lomas de Sotelo, Mexico	

== See also ==
- List of Mexican boxing world champions
- List of world super-featherweight boxing champions

Sporting positions
Regional boxing titles
Preceded by Ismael González	WBC FECARBOX featherweight champion February 21, 2004 – 2004; Vacated	Vacant Title next held by Héctor Velázquez
Preceded by Robert Guerrero	NABF featherweight champion December 2, 2005 – June 23, 2006	Succeeded by Robert Guerrero
World boxing titles
Preceded by Takahiro Ao	WBC super-featherweight champion October 27, 2012 – April 8, 2013	Succeeded by Takashi Miura
