= Francisco Lorenzo =

Dominican Republic boxer

Personal information
- Nickname: El Ahogado
- Nationality: Dominican
- Born: April 4, 1971 (age 55) San Cristóbal, Dominican Republic
- Height: 5 ft 7.5 in (1.71 m)
- Weight: Super featherweight; Lightweight; Light welterweight

Boxing career
- Reach: 71 in (182 cm)
- Stance: Orthodox

Boxing record
- Total fights: 54
- Wins: 39
- Win by KO: 17
- Losses: 14
- No contests: 1

Francisco Lorenzo (born October 27, 1971) is a Dominican former professional boxer who competed from 2000 to 2014. He challenged for the WBC super featherweight title in 2008, and originally won the WBC interim title that year, but was not awarded the title due to the controversy of his win over Humberto Soto.

== Pro career ==
In June 2005, Francisco upset future WBA World, IBF and WBA Lightweight champion Nate Campbell.

=== Interim WBC Super Featherweight Championship ===
On December 20, 2008 Lorenzo lost his second fight with Humberto Soto by twelve round decision, the bout was for the Interim WBC Super Featherweight championship.

== After boxing ==
Lorenzo opened a gym in the Dominican Repuvblic after retirement. In order to buy equipment for his gym, he got work on a construction company. In 2019, he suffered an accident while working for the construction company and had three fingers from his left hand amputated.

== Professional boxing record ==
54 fights	39 wins	14 losses
By knockout	17	3
By decision	21	11
By disqualification	1	0
No contests	1	

No.	Result	Record	Opponent	Type	Round, time	Date	Location	Notes
54	Loss	39–14 (1)	Braulio Rodriguez	KO	1 (10), 2:10	27 Sep 2014	Coliseo Pedro Julio Nolasco, La Romana, Dominican Republic	
53	Loss	39–13 (1)	Javier Fortuna	TKO	4 (10), 3:00	10 Mar 2014	Polideportvo Eleoncio Mercedes, La Romana, Dominican Republic	
52	Loss	39–12 (1)	Israel Héctor Perez	RTD	7 (10), 3:00	20 Jul 2013	Salon de Fiestas Egeo, Paysandú, Uruguay	
51	Win	39–11 (1)	Donny Garcias	SD	8	12 Aug 2012	Coliseo Carlos 'Teo' Cruz, Santo Domingo, Dominican Republic	
50	Win	38–11 (1)	Juan Carlos Contreras	UD	6	17 Dec 2011	Polideportivo, Cambita Garabitos, Dominican Republic	
49	Loss	37–11 (1)	Dierry Jean	UD	10	20 Oct 2011	Bell Centre, Montreal, Quebec, Canada	
48	Win	37–10 (1)	Juan Encarnacion	TKO	3 (6), 3:00	5 Sep 2011	Coliseo Carlos 'Teo' Cruz, Santo Domingo, Dominican Republic	
47	Loss	36–10 (1)	Luis Ramos Jr.	UD	8	3 Jun 2011	Fantasy Springs Resort Casino, Indio, California, U.S.	
46	Win	36–9 (1)	Aneudy Mesa	UD	8	24 Jan 2011	Parque del Este, Santo Domingo, Dominican Republic	
45	Loss	35–9 (1)	Érik Morales	UD	12	18 Dec 2010	Agua Caliente Racetrack, Tijuana, Mexico	For WBC Silver super-lightweight title
44	Win	35–8 (1)	Ambiorix Ciriaco	TKO	7 (10), 1:23	16 Oct 2010	Polideportivo, San Cristobal, Dominican Republic	
43	NC	34–8 (1)	Javier Fortuna	NC	1 (9), 1:46	19 Aug 2010	Dominican Fiesta Hotel & Casino, Santo Domingo, Dominican Republic	For vacant WBA Fedebol super-featherweight title
42	Loss	34–8	Jorge Linares	MD	10	27 Mar 2010	Polideportivo José María Vargas, La Guaira, Venezuela	
41	Loss	34–7	Yenifel Vicente	SD	10	16 Nov 2009	Coliseo Carlos 'Teo' Cruz, Santo Domingo, Dominican Republic	
40	Win	34–6	Leonardo Espinal	TKO	2 (6)	22 Aug 2009	Polideportivo, Nagua, Dominican Republic	
39	Loss	33–6	Mlungisi Dlamini	UD	12	7 Aug 2009	Mangaung Indoor Centre, Bloemfontein, South Africa	For WBF (Foundation) lightweight title
38	Loss	33–5	Humberto Soto	UD	12	20 Dec 2008	Parque Andrés Quintana Roo, Cozumel, Mexico	For vacant WBC super-featherweight title
37	Win	33–4	Humberto Soto	DQ	4 (12), 2:43	28 Jun 2008	Mandalay Bay Events Center, Paradise, Nevada, U.S.	Vacant WBC interim super-featherweight title at stake; Soto disqualified for hitting after a knockdown; Lorenzo not awarded title by WBC
36	Win	32–4	Jesús Salvador Pérez	UD	8	25 Apr 2008	Coliseo Antonio R. Barcelo, Toa Baja, Puerto Rico	
35	Win	31–4	Manuel Valdez	UD	8	17 Dec 2007	Coliseo Carlos 'Teo' Cruz, Santo Domingo, Dominican Republic	
34	Win	30–4	Jose Guadalupe Rosales	UD	10	9 Nov 2007	Paradise Theater, The Bronx, New York, U.S.	
33	Win	29–4	Baudel Cardenas	UD	10	13 Jul 2007	Congress Theater, Chicago, Illinois, U.S.	
32	Win	28–4	Cristóbal Cruz	UD	12	13 Apr 2007	Cicero Stadium, Cicero, Illinois, U.S.	Retained WBC–CABOFE super-featherweight title
31	Loss	27–4	Román Martínez	SD	12	2 Feb 2007	Coliseo Pedrin Zorrilla, San Juan, Puerto Rico	For vacant WBO Inter-Continental super-featherweight title
30	Win	27–3	Cristóbal Cruz	UD	8	1 Dec 2006	Stadium 1909 S. Laramie, Cicero, Illinois, U.S.	
29	Win	26–3	Santiago Matos	TKO	3 (10)	22 Jul 2006	Polideportivo, San Cristobal, Dominican Republic	
28	Win	25–3	Priest Smalls	UD	10	29 Jun 2006	American Airlines Arena, Miami, Florida, U.S.	Retained WBC–CABOFE super-featherweight title
27	Win	24–3	Alejandro Heredia	UD	12	8 May 2006	Coliseo Carlos 'Teo' Cruz, Santo Domingo, Dominican Republic	Retained WBC–CABOFE super-featherweight title
26	Win	23–3	Francisco Pena	KO	1 (12)	10 Dec 2005	Santo Domingo, Dominican Republic	Won vacant WBC–CABOFE super-featherweight title
25	Win	22–3	Nate Campbell	SD	10	14 Jun 2005	St. Petersburg Coliseum, Saint Petersburg, Florida, U.S.	
24	Win	21–3	Alexis Urena	TKO	2 (8)	28 May 2005	Gimnasio Internacional de Boxeo, Villa Mella, Dominican Republic	
23	Win	20–3	Ivan Valle	SD	10	10 Mar 2005	Municipal Auditorium, San Antonio, Texas, U.S.	
22	Loss	19–3	Courtney Burton	SD	12	5 Dec 2003	UVI Sports & Fitness Center, Charlotte Amalie, U.S. Virgin Islands	For vacant WBO–NABO lightweight title
21	Win	19–2	Ubaldo Hernandez	SD	10	3 Oct 2003	Reliant Park, Houston, Texas, U.S.	
20	Loss	18–2	Juan Díaz	UD	10	19 Jul 2003	Reliant Park, Houston, Texas, U.S.	For WBC Youth World lightweight title
19	Win	18–1	Genaro Trazancos	UD	10	10 May 2003	Pechanga Resort & Casino, Temecula, California, U.S.	
18	Win	17–1	Santiago Matos	KO	3 (12)	21 Mar 2003	Coliseo Carlos 'Teo' Cruz, Santo Domingo, Dominican Republic	Won vacant WBA Fedecaribe super-featherweight title
17	Win	16–1	Francisco Melendez	KO	4	19 Dec 2002	Coliseo Carlos 'Teo' Cruz, Santo Domingo, Dominican Republic	
16	Win	15–1	Luis Sosa	TKO	6	7 Nov 2002	Coliseo Carlos 'Teo' Cruz, Santo Domingo, Dominican Republic	
15	Win	14–1	Alexis Urena	TKO	4	20 Sep 2002	Coliseo Carlos 'Teo' Cruz, Santo Domingo, Dominican Republic	
14	Win	13–1	Santiago Matos	UD	12	15 Jun 2002	San Cristóbal, Dominican Republic	
13	Win	12–1	Rafael Valerio	TKO	1	10 May 2002	Santo Domingo, Dominican Republic	
12	Win	11–1	Julio Jerez	TKO	3	4 May 2002	La Romana, Dominican Republic	
11	Win	10–1	Luis Sosa	UD	8	29 Nov 2001	Santo Domingo, Dominican Republic	
10	Win	9–1	Andres Martinez	TKO	5	28 Sep 2001	Santo Domingo, Dominican Republic	
9	Win	8–1	Leonardo Espinal	TKO	2	9 Aug 2001	Santo Domingo, Dominican Republic	
8	Win	7–1	Francisco De Leon	UD	12	29 Jun 2001	Santo Domingo, Dominican Republic	Retained Dominican super-featherweight title
7	Loss	6–1	Victoriano Sosa	PTS	12	30 Apr 2001	Santo Domingo, Dominican Republic	For Dominican lightweight title
6	Win	6–0	Laureano Ramírez	UD	12	18 Feb 2001	Santo Domingo, Dominican Republic	Won vacant Dominican super-featherweight title
5	Win	5–0	Andres Martinez	TKO	3	21 Dec 2000	La Romana, Dominican Republic	
4	Win	4–0	Freddy Cruz	UD	10	23 Nov 2000	Santo Domingo, Dominican Republic	
3	Win	3–0	Luis Ernesto José	SD	6	15 Sep 2000	Santo Domingo, Dominican Republic	
2	Win	2–0	Marino Abreu	KO	1 (4)	26 Jun 2000	La Romana, Dominican Republic	
1	Win	1–0	Angel Santana	TKO	4 (4)	13 May 2000	Dominican Republic	
