= Luis Fuentes =

Luis Fuentes may refer to:

- Luis Fuentes (wrestler) (born 1946), Guatemalan wrestler
- Luis Fuentes (politician) (born 1960), Spanish politician
- Luis Fuentes (footballer, born 1971), Chilean footballer
- Luis Fuentes (footballer, born 1986), Mexican football left-back
- Luis Fuentes (footballer, born 1995), Chilean football midfielder

== See also ==
- Luis Fuente (born 1991), Mexican boxer
- Luisa Fuentes (born 1948), Peruvian volleyball player
