= Tiger Smalls =

American boxer

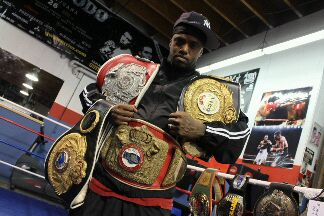
- Smalls in 2011

Personal information
- Nicknames: Tiger - The Pride of the Wild; The One and Only; The Bad Guy
- Born: Priest George Youngs Smalls; March 2, 1969 (age 57) New York, New York, United States
- Height: 5'9
- Weight: Super featherweight Featherweight; Junior featherweight

Boxing career
- Reach: 72"
- Stance: Orthodox

Boxing record
- Total fights: 38
- Wins: 21
- Win by KO: 11
- Losses: 16
- Draws: 1
- No contests: 0

Tiger Smalls (born Priest George Youngs Smalls on March 2, 1969) is a professional American boxing trainer who formerly held the World Boxing Organization Inter-Continental Featherweight title and North American Boxing Organization Featherweight title, as well as the Universal Boxing Association world featherweight title.

== Early life ==
Smalls spent his early years in the training camp of Muhammad Ali in Deer Lake, Pennsylvania and was featured in Jet magazine in 1973 at age three. He gained some minor celebrity for a photograph where Ali grimaces from one of young Smalls' punches.

== Career ==
Smalls was a standout amateur with a reported record of 92–11. With fast hands and feet and better than average power, Smalls is reported to have won several amateur titles in the Junior Olympics, Silver Gloves, the New York Golden Gloves, the Diamond Gloves, and the Amateur Athletic Union. He and also several military titles while serving in the U.S. Navy, including the 1988 All-Armed Forces bantamweight championship.

Smalls began his pro career on March 30, 1993. He became the Universal Boxing Association World Featherweight Champion in 1997 by knocking out Tony Green in the first round, and claimed the California State Featherweight title in 2002 by defeating Roger Medal with a technical knockout in the second round. Smalls earned the World Boxing Organization Inter-Continental Featherweight title in 2003 by defeating Christian Favela. The following year, he defeated Alvin Brown for the North American Boxing Organization Featherweight Championship.

Smalls was inducted into the California Boxing Hall of Fame in October 2013.

== Controversy ==
Controversy dogged Smalls throughout his career. Smalls upset the boxing establishment when he appeared in the February 2005 issue of High Times magazine, posing for a photo wearing his belts and holding a marijuana bud. The article quoted him as saying that he regularly smoked marijuana during training. Later that year, he angered ESPN when he showed up to defend his NABO featherweight title bearing a temporary tattoo for Golden Palace, the online casino.

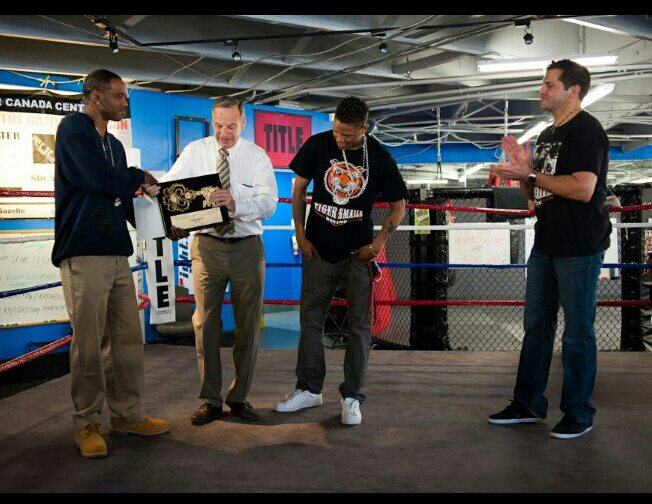
Tiger Smalls Receiving Key to the City

== Personal life ==
Tiger Smalls trains his son Prince Tiger Smalls and mentors students and fighters at the San Diego Combat Academy.

San Diego Mayor Bob Filner presented Smalls with the key to the City of San Diego on March 2, 2013.

== Professional boxing record ==
21 Wins (9 knockouts, 12 decisions), 16 Losses (14 decisions, 2 TKO), 1 Draw
Res.	Opponent	Type	Date	Location	Notes
Loss	Juan Castaneda Jr.	Decision (unanimous)	November 30, 2007	(United States) Santa Ynez, CA	
Loss	Vasyl Tarabarov	Decision (split)	October 13, 2007	(United States) Hoffman Estates, IL	
Loss	Nick Casal	Decision (split)	June 1, 2007	(United States) Santa Ynez, CA	
Loss	Vicente Escobedo	Decision (unanimous)	February 1, 2007	(United States) Arco Arena, Sacramento, CA	
Loss	Castulo Gonzalez	Decision (unanimous)	November 24, 2006	(United States) Boston, MA	
Win	Pete Frissina	Decision (split)	September 29, 2006	(United States) Tampa, FL	
Loss	Francisco Lorenzo	Decision (unanimous)	June 29, 2006	(United States) American Airlines Arena, Miami, FL	WBC Caribbean Boxing Federation (CABOFE) super featherweight title
Loss	Elio Rojas	TKO	January 7, 2006	(United States) Madison Square Garden New York, NY	
Loss	Juan Ruiz	Decision (unanimous)	November 22, 2005	(United States) Lancaster, CA	WBO-NABO junior featherweight title.
Loss	Marcos Ramirez	Decision (unanimous)	August 2, 2005	(United States) Kansas City, MO	Lost WBO-NABO featherweight title. Aired on ESPN2
Win	Alvin Brown	Decision (unanimous)	September 22, 2004	(United States) Kansas City, MO	Won WBO-NABO featherweight title.
Win	Anthony Martinez	Decision (unanimous)	August 27, 2004	(United States) Burbank, CA	WBO-INC featherweight title defense.
Win	Ramon Valle	Decision (unanimous)	April 9, 2004	(United States) Burbank, CA	WBO-INC featherweight title defense.
Loss	Ismael Gonzalez	Decision (split)	April 9, 2004	(United States) Montobello, CA	
Win	Pedro Mora	Decision (split)	November 14, 2003	(United States) Montobello, CA	
Win	Cristian Favela	Decision (unanimous)	July 17, 2003	(United States) City of Industry, CA	WBO Inter-Continental featherweight title.
Win	Roger Medal	TKO	September 20, 2002	(United States) Burbank, CA	California State featherweight title. Medal ruled unable to continue due to shoulder dislocation.
Win	Mario Camarena	Decision (unanimous)	August 23, 2002	(United States) Montebello, CA	
Win	Artur Petrosyan	Decision (unanimous)	November 29, 2001	(United States) Inglewood, CA	
Loss	Marcos Licona	Decision (unanimous)	May 11, 2000	(United States) Irvine, CA	
Loss	James Armah	TKO	September 13, 1999	(United States) Irvine, CA	California State Featherweight title.
Win	Roger Medal	Decision (split)	August 9, 1999	(United States) Anaheim, CA	California State featherweight title.
Win	Eddie Croft	KO	March 31, 1999	(United States) Monterey, CA	
Win	Fernando Trejo	Decision (unanimous)	December 27, 1998	(United States) Inglewood, CA	
Loss	Marcos Licona	Decision (split)	May 28, 1998	(United States) Irvine, CA	
Win	Tony Green	TKO	March 22, 1997	(United States) Pikeville, KY	Universal Boxing Association world featherweight title.
Loss	Danny Bostic	Decision (unanimous)	January 23, 1997	(United States) St. Louis, MO	
Win	Frankie Banda	KO	June 3, 1996	(United States) Anaheim, CA	
Loss	Sergio Sanchez	Points	December 13, 1995	(United States) Woodland Hills, CA	
Win	Gary Adkins	KO	November 10, 1995	(United States) Asheville, NC	
Win	Olegario DeLeon	TKO	October 26, 1995	(United States) Woodland Hills, CA	
Win	James McCloskey	TKO	June 2, 1995	(United States) Latham, NY	
Win	Jimmy Navaro	TKO 2nd	February 20, 1995	(United States) Inglewood, CA	
Draw	Oscar Zamora	Points	August 29, 1994	(United States) Inglewood, CA	
Win	Thomas Stiltner	KO	July 16, 1994	(United States) Asheville, NC	
Win	Hilario Guererro	Points	April 11, 1994	(United States) Inglewood, CA	
Win	Oscar Aguilar	KO	July 19, 1993	Tijuana, Mexico	
Loss	Richard Thiele	Points	March 30, 1993	(United States) San Diego, CA	
