= Miguel Vázquez =

Mexican boxer (born 1987)

Personal information
- Nickname: El Títere ("The Puppet")
- Born: Miguel Ángel Vázquez Bautista; 6 January 1987 (age 39) Guadalajara, Jalisco, Mexico
- Height: 5 ft 10 in (178 cm)
- Weight: Lightweight; Light welterweight; Welterweight

Boxing career
- Reach: 72 in (183 cm)
- Stance: Orthodox

Boxing record
- Total fights: 58
- Wins: 44
- Win by KO: 17
- Losses: 14

Miguel Ángel Vázquez Bautista (born 6 January 1987) is a Mexican professional boxer who held the IBF lightweight title from 2010 to 2014.

== Professional career ==
=== Early career ===
Vázquez made his professional debut on 20 January 2006 against Canelo Álvarez (who was just fifteen years old at the time) in a welterweight bout, losing a four-round split decision. He won his next eighteen bouts before losing a unanimous decision to Timothy Bradley on 27 July 2007, in a bout for the WBC Youth super lightweight title. Bradley would go on to say "I knew the fight was going to be tough—he's Mexican. I give him a lot of credit. He's a good fighter." In June 2008, Vázquez claimed the WBC FECARBOX light welterweight title, defeating veteran Aldo Valtierra by technical knockout after eleven rounds. The local commission later came under criticism by a ringside doctor, as the fight was too one-sided and risked the wellbeing of Valtierra. A rematch against Álvarez was fought on 28 June 2008, this time at light middleweight, in which Vázquez lost a ten-round unanimous decision.

On 17 July 2009, Vázquez won a ten-round split decision over then-undefeated world-ranked prospect Breidis Prescott. Prescott scored a knockdown early on but as the fight went, Vázquez accumulated rounds with his sharper boxing and ultimately got the nod over Prescott.

=== Lightweight title reign ===
On 14 August 2010, Vázquez fought Ji-Hoon Kim for the vacant IBF lightweight title. Vázquez beat Kim by unanimous decision to win the world title. His first successful title defense was against Ricardo Dominguez on 27 November 2010. Vázquez won the fight with another wide unanimous decision Vázquez made a second successful defense on 12 March 2011 against then-undefeated Leonardo Zappavigna, defeating him by a wide margin over the twelve-round distance. During the fight, Zappavigna landed a solid overhand right to the champion early, but Vázquez responded by opening up a cut over the challenger's left eye and outboxing him for most of the fight.

Vázquez made his third defense against Ammeth Díaz, scoring a knockdown in round 6 en route to another wide decision win. Vázquez headlined a show on HBO for the first, defeating Marvin Quintero via split decision. Vázquez notched a fifth successful defense against Mercito Gesta, whom he defeated by unanimous decision on the undercard of Manny Pacquiao vs. Juan Manuel Márquez IV.

=== Vázquez vs. Burns cancellation ===
On January 14, 2013, it was announced that Vázquez will meet lightweight titleholder Ricky Burns in a unification bout on March 16, the card would take place at Wembley Arena in London. Warren announced that he would reschedule the bout for April 20 because Vázquez suffered a viral infection due to food poisoning. After weeks of rumors about the fight being in doubt it fell apart.

In February 2014, Vázquez decisioned Denis Shafikov on Macau.

During his title reign, Vázquez often was criticised for being a boring fighter, as he focused on controlling the distance and keeping opponents at bay through his footwork and jab, as well as employing "dirty" tactics like headbutts and excessive clinching to outmaneuver his opponents.

On 13 September 2014, Vázquez faced Mickey Bey on the undercard of Floyd Mayweather Jr. vs. Marcos Maidana II. Vázquez lost the IBF title in a split decision, being defeated for the first time since 2008. The judges' scorecards were 119–109 and 115–113 for Bey, and 115-113 for Vázquez. Many ringside observers felt Vázquez had won the fight and criticized the decision, especially the 119–109 by Robert Hoyle.

=== Later career ===
Vázquez bounced back with a wide unanimous decision win over Jerry Belmontes. However, in October 2015 he suffered another setback, losing another controversial decision to Argenis Mendez. Vázquez won his next four fights against outmatched journeymen. In September 2017, it was announced that Vázquez would face Josh Taylor for the WBC Silver light welterweight title at the Royal Highland Centre on 11 November. Although Vázquez's style seem to pose problems for Taylor early on, Taylor wore him down as the fight went on. Vázquez went down in round 9 from body shots, and he failed to beat the count. This was Vázquez's first stoppage loss.

In his next more notable fight in the UK, Vazquez faced Ohara Davies. Vazquez lost the fight on a controversial points decision .

On 17 October 2020, Vazquez fought Lewis Ritson for the vacant WBA Inter-Continental light welterweight title. Vazquez boxed beautifully throughout the fight and seemed to be winning most of the rounds. Despite that, two of the referees scored the fight 117-111 and 115–113 in favor of Ritson, while the other referee had it 116-113 for Vazquez, awarding Ritson with a highly controversial split-decision victory. Promoter Eddie Hearn called it a disgrace of a card and terrible for the sport whilst the majority of observers also felt Vazquez won the fight clearly.

== Professional boxing record ==
56 fights	44 wins	12 losses
By knockout	17	3
By decision	27	9

No.	Result	Record	Opponent	Type	Round, time	Date	Location	Notes
56	Loss	44–12	Timo Schwarzkopf	UD	10	4 Feb 2023	Argensporthalle, Wangen im Allgaeu, Germany	
55	Loss	44–11	Gary Cully	KO	5 (10), 0:41	12 Mar 2022	Nottingham Arena, Nottingham, England	
54	Win	44–10	Oliver Flores	UD	10	2 Oct 2021	Verite Social Venue, Monterrey, Mexico	Won vacant WBA Fedelatin lightweight title
53	Win	43–10	Isai Hernandez	TKO	7 (10), 0:43	16 Apr 2021	Verite Social Venue, Monterrey, Mexico	
52	Loss	42–10	Lewis Ritson	SD	12	17 Oct 2020	East of England Arena, Peterborough, England	For vacant WBA Inter-Continental light welterweight title
51	Win	42–9	Jesus Velasco	TKO	5 (6), 2:45	28 Dec 2019	Auditorio Chalchocoyo, Matlapa, Mexico	
50	Loss	41–9	Batyrzhan Jukembayev	UD	10	26 Sep 2019	Montreal Casino, Montreal, Quebec, Canada	For vacant WBA Continental and IBF Inter-Continental light welterweight titles
49	Loss	41–8	Ohara Davies	PTS	10	28 Jun 2019	York Hall, London, England	
48	Win	41–7	Ghislain Maduma	SD	10	16 Mar 2019	Montreal Casino, Montreal, Quebec, Canada	
47	Loss	40–7	Thulani Mbenge	RTD	9 (12), 3:00	8 Dec 2018	Emperor's Palace, Kempton Park, South Africa	
46	Win	40–6	Cosme Rivera	UD	10	13 Apr 2018	Parque Revolucion, Culiacán, Mexico	
45	Loss	39–6	Josh Taylor	KO	9 (12), 2:30	11 Nov 2017	Royal Highland Centre, Edinburgh, Scotland	For WBC Silver light welterweight title
44	Win	39–5	Jose Daniel Ruiz	KO	4 (10), 2:09	2 Sep 2017	Tlaquepaque, Mexico	
43	Win	38–5	Javier Mercado	UD	8	1 Jul 2017	Arena Óscar Larios, Tonalá, Mexico	
42	Win	37–5	Armando Patino	KO	2 (8), 2:32	29 Apr 2017	Coliseo, La Barca, Mexico	
41	Win	36–5	Erick Bone	UD	10	28 May 2016	Cowboys Dancehall, San Antonio, Texas, U.S.	
40	Loss	35–5	Argenis Mendez	UD	10	6 Oct 2015	Cowboys Dancehall, San Antonio, Texas, U.S.	
39	Win	35–4	Jerry Belmontes	UD	10	13 Mar 2015	Citizens Business Bank Arena, Ontario, California, U.S.	
38	Loss	34–4	Mickey Bey	SD	12	13 Sep 2014	MGM Grand Garden Arena, Paradise, Nevada, U.S.	Lost IBF lightweight title
37	Win	34–3	Denis Shafikov	UD	12	22 Feb 2014	Cotai Arena, Macau, SAR	Retained IBF lightweight title
36	Win	33–3	Mercito Gesta	UD	12	8 Dec 2012	MGM Grand Garden Arena, Paradise, Nevada, U.S.	Retained IBF lightweight title
35	Win	32–3	Marvin Quintero	SD	12	27 Oct 2012	Turning Stone Resort Casino, Verona, New York, U.S.	Retained IBF lightweight title
34	Win	31–3	Daniel Attah	UD	10	16 Jun 2012	Sun Bowl, El Paso, Texas, U.S.	
33	Win	30–3	Ammeth Diaz	UD	12	21 Jan 2012	Coliseo Olímpico, Guadalajara, Jalisco	Retained IBF lightweight title
32	Win	29–3	Marlon Aguilar	KO	2 (10), 1:46	18 Jun 2011	Musica Hall, Toluca, Mexico	
31	Win	28–3	Leonardo Zappavigna	UD	12	12 Mar 2011	MGM Grand Garden Arena, Paradise, Nevada, U.S.	Retained IBF lightweight title
30	Win	27–3	Ricardo Dominguez	UD	12	27 Nov 2010	Auditorio Municipal, Tijuana, Mexico	Retained IBF lightweight title
29	Win	26–3	Kim Ji-hoon	UD	12	14 Aug 2010	Energy Arena, Laredo, Texas, U.S.	Won vacant IBF lightweight title
28	Win	25–3	Breidis Prescott	SD	10	17 Jul 2009	Planet Hollywood Resort & Casino, Paradise, Nevada, U.S.	
27	Win	24–3	Antonio Valencia	TKO	3 (4), 2:00	28 Feb 2009	Polideportivo Centenario, Los Mochis, Mexico	
26	Win	23–3	Manuel Bocanegra	TKO	3 (8), 2:34	19 Dec 2008	National Western Complex Arena, Denver, Colorado, U.S.	
25	Win	22–3	Rodrigo Juarez	UD	8	4 Oct 2008	Expo Forum, Hermosillo, Mexico	
24	Loss	21–3	Canelo Álvarez	UD	10	28 Jun 2008	Palenque Calle 2, Zapopan, Mexico	
23	Win	21–2	Aldo Valtierra	TKO	11 (12), 2:31	5 Jun 2008	Roots Magic Club, Mexico City, Mexico	Won vacant WBC FECARBOX light welterweight title
22	Win	20–2	Jorge Ortiz	UD	8	2 May 2008	Pharaoh's Casino, Managua, Nicaragua	
21	Win	19–2	Francisco Villanueva	UD	12	23 Nov 2007	Coliseo Olímpico, Guadalajara, Mexico	Won vacant Jalisco light welterweight title
20	Loss	18–2	Timothy Bradley	UD	10	27 Jul 2007	Omega Products International, Corona, California, U.S.	For WBC Youth light welterweight title
19	Win	18–1	Reyes Sanchez	UD	8	24 May 2007	Salon 21, Mexico City, Mexico	
18	Win	17–1	Juventino Barrera	UD	12	30 Mar 2007	Arena Jalisco, Guadalajara, Mexico	Won vacant Jalisco welterweight title
17	Win	16–1	Marco Nazareth	KO	2 (6)	16 Mar 2007	Guadalajara, Mexico	
16	Win	15–1	Victor Marquez	KO	4 (10)	16 Feb 2007	Guadalajara, Mexico	
15	Win	14–1	Mario Alberto Altamirano Becerra	KO	4 (6), 2:00	2 Feb 2007	Arena Jalisco, Guadalajara, Mexico	
14	Win	13–1	Juan Cario	KO	1 (8)	19 Jan 2007	Arena Jalisco, Guadalajara, Mexico	
13	Win	12–1	Juan Jose Garcia	TKO	2 (8)	8 Dec 2006	Arena Jalisco, Guadalajara, Mexico	
12	Win	11–1	Juan Avila	UD	8	24 Nov 2006	Arena Jalisco, Guadalajara, Mexico	
11	Win	10–1	Javier Zavala	KO	1 (6)	10 Nov 2006	Arena Jalisco, Guadalajara, Mexico	
10	Win	9–1	Francisco Villanueva	TKO	4 (6)	27 Oct 2006	Arena Jalisco, Guadalajara, Mexico	
9	Win	8–1	Azael Gonzalez	UD	6	13 Oct 2006	Arena Jalisco, Guadalajara, Mexico	
8	Win	7–1	Luis Romero	KO	1 (6), 2:47	29 Sep 2006	Tonalá, Mexico	
7	Win	6–1	Leonardo Perez	KO	1 (6)	15 Sep 2006	Guadalajara, Mexico	
6	Win	5–1	Baltazar Molina	UD	6	18 Aug 2006	Arena Coliseo, Guadalajara, Mexico	
5	Win	4–1	Alfonso Enrique	UD	4	6 Jul 2006	Salon 21, Mexico City, Mexico	
4	Win	3–1	Irving Sidarta	UD	4	1 Jun 2006	Salon 21, Mexico City, Mexico	
3	Win	2–1	Javier Prieto	UD	4	4 May 2006	Salon 21, Mexico City, Mexico	
2	Win	1–1	Christian Juarez	UD	4	23 Mar 2006	Salon 21, Mexico City, Mexico	
1	Loss	0–1	Canelo Álvarez	SD	4	20 Jan 2006	Guadalajara, Mexico	

== See also ==
- List of Mexican boxing world champions

Sporting positions
Regional boxing titles
Vacant Title last held by Damian Frias	WBC FECARBOX light welterweight champion 5 June 2008 – October 2008; Vacated	Vacant Title next held by Oscar Maximiliano James
World boxing titles
Vacant Title last held by Nate Campbell	IBF lightweight champion 14 August 2010 – 13 September 2014	Succeeded by Mickey Bey
