= César Figueroa =

Mexican boxer (born 1977)

Personal information
- Nickname: El César
- Born: César Figueroa Hernández; 19 October 1977 (age 48) Mexico City, Mexico
- Height: 1.70 m (5 ft 7 in)
- Weight: Lightweight; Super featherweight Super bantamweight

Boxing career
- Reach: 178 cm (70 in)
- Stance: Orthodox

Boxing record
- Total fights: 39
- Wins: 30
- Win by KO: 22
- Losses: 7
- Draws: 2
- No contests: 0

César Figueroa Hernández (born 19 October 1977) is a Mexican former professional boxer who competed from 1996 to 2008, challenging for the WBO super bantamweight title in 2008.

== Professional career ==
=== Mexico National Championship ===
In June 2001, Pérez upset the veteran Emidgio Gastelum by T.K.O. to win the Mexican National featherweight title.

On 28 February 2003 Marco Angel lost to Humberto Soto at the Orleans Hotel and Casino in Las Vegas.
