= Humberto Soto =

Mexican boxer (born 1980)

Personal information
- Nicknames: La Zorrita; The Crafty Little Fox
- Born: Armando Humberto Soto Ochoa; May 11, 1980 (age 46) Los Mochis, Sinaloa, Mexico
- Height: 5 ft 7 1/2 in (171 cm)
- Weight: Super bantamweight; Featherweight; Super featherweight; Lightweight; Light welterweight; Welterweight

Boxing career
- Reach: 69 in (175 cm)
- Stance: Orthodox

Boxing record
- Total fights: 82
- Wins: 69
- Win by KO: 37
- Losses: 10
- Draws: 2
- No contests: 1

Armando Humberto Soto Ochoa (born May 11, 1980), best known as Humberto Soto, is a Mexican former professional boxer who competed from 1997 to 2019. He was a world champion in two weight classes, having held the World Boxing Council (WBC) super featherweight title from 2008 to 2009, and the WBC lightweight title from 2010 to 2011. He also held the WBC interim featherweight title from 2005 to 2006.

== Professional career ==
Soto made his pro debut at the age of 17 and accumulated a record of 36–5–2, which included a 14 fight undefeated streak, before challenging for his first major title.

=== Featherweight ===
On August 20, 2005, Soto won the interim WBC Featherweight title by beating Rocky Juarez, in a fight which he accepted on two weeks notice.

On January 17, 2006, Soto defended his interim title by knocking out Oscar León in the 9th round. He vacated his interim featherweight title and defeated Ivan Valle in a WBC Super Featherweight title eliminator bout.

On January 22, 2007, Soto defeated Humberto Toledo (30–2–2) by third-round knockout. In his next bout, he defeated Bobby Pacquiao by seventh-round knockout.

On November 17, 2007, Soto fought reigning WBO Super Featherweight champion Joan Guzmán but lost the bout by unanimous decision.

=== Soto vs. Guzman ===
On November 17, 2007, Humberto Soto fought WBO Junior-Welterweight champion Joan Guzman. The Dominican champion dominated the fight based on his speed of hands, reflexes, and superior boxing skills, effectively counter punching the relentless attack of Soto, who showcased tremendous strength, courage and determination. Guzman won the bout by Unanimous Decision.

=== Super Featherweight ===
==== Soto vs. Lorenzo ====
On June 28, 2008, Soto faced off against Francisco Lorenzo (33–4, 14 KOs) for the vacant interim WBC Super Featherweight title. Soto knocked Lorenzo down twice in the fourth round with a barrage of punches. However, after lengthy consultations with officials at ringside, referee Joe Cortez disqualified Soto for hitting Lorenzo after he was down in what appeared to be a grazing punch. Cortez's decision was widely criticized and the WBC refused to award Lorenzo the title.

WBC president José Sulaimán condemned the decision as a "gross injustice" and one of the biggest he has seen in a long time. Sulaiman also announced that the WBC board of governors will vote on whether to declare the fight a no contest or to declare Soto the winner by knockout. Lorenzo, therefore, was not presented the green WBC belt as its champion, since it, though, opted to ignore the official verdict, and declared the title vacant. Sulaiman stated he wasn't seeking to overrule the decision, but: "While we respect the authority of the (Nevada commission) for a decision of the fight, we are the only ones to have the authority to decide on the decision relating to the WBC world title."

On October 11, 2008, Soto defeated Gamaliel Díaz to win the interim WBC Super Featherweight title by technical knock out. Soto knocked Diaz down in the first round and dominated him throughout the bout. Diaz was docked two points for excessive holding and his corner refused to send him out for the eleventh round.

On December 20, 2008, Soto captured the vacant WBC Super Featherweight Championship with a 12-round unanimous decision over Francisco Lorenzo in a rematch of their controversial bout. Lorenzo was repeatedly warned for low-blows and headbutting throughout the bout. Lorenzo was docked one point in the 7th round for headbutting and another in the 8th for excessive holding. The final scores were 117-109 from two of the judges and 118–108 on the other card in favor of Soto.

In 2009, Soto successfully defended his WBC Super Featherweight title 3 times. On December 12, 2009, Soto moved up to the lightweight division and defeated former two-time champion Jesús Chávez by a 10-round unanimous decision.

=== Lightweight ===
On March 13, 2010, Soto claimed the WBC Lightweight Championship by defeating David Diaz. Soto dropped Diaz in the opening and final rounds en route to a unanimous decision victory.

On May 15, 2010, Soto made his first title defense against Ricardo Dominguez. Soto won the fight with a 12-round unanimous decision with the judges scoring the fight, 118–110 on two of the scorecards and 117–112 on the other one for Soto.

Soto and Urbano Antillon staged a stirring world lightweight title bout at the Honda Center. Soto, relying on his ability to strike the challenger with barrages, made his third successful title defense by outlasting Maywood's Antillon in a close unanimous decision, December 4, 2010.

=== Super Lightweight ===
In July 2011 Soto relinquished his WBC Lightweight Title in anticipation of competing in the junior welterweight division.

A bout between hard-hitting Argentinian junior welterweight and Soto has been confirmed for late April. Soto is riding a 14-bout winning streak that includes six knockouts.

=== Soto vs. Matthysse ===
On June 23, 2012, Humberto Soto faced hard-hitting junior welterweight Lucas Matthysse. dropped Soto in the fifth round. Soto's corner stopped the bout between the rounds.

== Professional boxing record ==
82 fights	69 wins	10 losses
By knockout	37	3
By decision	32	6
By disqualification	0	1
Draws	2	
No contests	1	

No.	Result	Record	Opponent	Type	Round, time	Date	Location	Notes
82	Loss	69–10–2 (1)	Jessie Vargas	TKO	6 (10), 1:48	Apr 26, 2019	The Forum, Inglewood, California, U.S.	
81	Win	69–9–2 (1)	Brandon Ríos	UD	12	Feb 23, 2019	Auditorio Fausto Gutierrez Moreno, Tijuana, Mexico	
80	Win	68–9–2 (1)	Edgar Puerta	UD	10	Aug 3, 2018	Plaza Pueblo Antiguo, Ensenada, Mexico	
79	Win	67–9–2 (1)	Joel Juarez	TKO	2 (10), 2:35	May 26, 2018	Rosarito Beach, Mexico	
78	Win	66–9–2 (1)	Daniel Ruiz	TKO	2 (10), 2:08	Oct 1, 2016	Gimnasio Cuauhtémoc, Mexico City, Mexico	
77	Loss	65–9–2 (1)	Antonio Orozco	UD	10	Oct 3, 2015	StubHub Center, Carson, California, U.S.	
76	Win	65–8–2 (1)	John Molina Jr.	UD	10	Sep 13, 2014	MGM Grand Garden Arena, Paradise, Nevada, U.S.	Won vacant WBO–NABO light welterweight title
75	Win	64–8–2 (1)	Wilfrido Buelvas	UD	12	Jun 14, 2014	Explanada Municipal, Tlalnepantla de Baz, Mexico	Retained WBC Silver International light welterweight title
74	Win	63–8–2 (1)	Juan Carlos Abreu	UD	10	Mar 22, 2014	Polideportivo Centenario, Los Mochis, Mexico	
73	Win	62–8–2 (1)	Mahonri Montes	UD	12	Sep 28, 2013	Polideportivo Centenario, Los Mochis, Mexico	Retained WBC Silver International light welterweight title
72	Win	61–8–2 (1)	Hiroshi Nakamori	TKO	9 (12), 2:29	Jun 8, 2013	Monumental Villa Charra "Carlos Bowser González", Tijuana, Mexico	Retained WBC Silver International light welterweight title
71	Win	60–8–2 (1)	Silverio Ortiz	UD	12	Feb 9, 2013	Arena ITSON, Ciudad Obregón, Mexico	Retained WBF (Federation) welterweight title; Won vacant WBC Silver International light welterweight title
70	Win	59–8–2 (1)	Jose Lopez	UD	12	Nov 10, 2012	Estadio Morelos, Morelia, Mexico	Won WBF (Federation) welterweight title
69	Loss	58–8–2 (1)	Lucas Matthysse	RTD	5 (10), 3:00	Jun 23, 2012	Staples Center, Los Angeles, California, U.S.	For vacant WBC Continental Americas light welterweight title
68	Win	58–7–2 (1)	Claudinei Lacerda	UD	10	Apr 7, 2012	Grand Oasis, Cancún, Mexico	
67	Win	57–7–2 (1)	Adailton de Jesus	KO	4 (10), 0:26	Nov 26, 2011	Campo Futbol Colosio, Playa del Carmen, Mexico	
66	Win	56–7–2 (1)	José Alfaro	TKO	2 (10), 1:00	Sep 3, 2011	Estadio Centenario, Los Mochis, Mexico	
65	Win	55–7–2 (1)	Motoki Sasaki	TD	11 (12), 1:18	Jun 25, 2011	Parque Andrés Quintana Roo, Cozumel, Mexico	Retained WBC lightweight title; Unanimous TD after Soto could not continue from a slip
64	Win	54–7–2 (1)	Fidel Muñoz	UD	10	Mar 5, 2011	Palenque de Feria, Tepic, Mexico	
63	Win	53–7–2 (1)	Urbano Antillón	UD	12	Dec 4, 2010	Honda Center, Anaheim, California, U.S.	Retained WBC lightweight title
62	Win	52–7–2 (1)	Fidel Muñoz	UD	12	Sep 18, 2010	Estadio Banorte, Culiacán, Mexico	Retained WBC lightweight title
61	Win	51–7–2 (1)	Ricardo Domínguez	UD	12	May 15, 2010	Estadio Centenario, Los Mochis, Mexico	Retained WBC lightweight title
60	Win	50–7–2 (1)	David Díaz	UD	12	Mar 13, 2010	Cowboys Stadium, Arlington, Texas, U.S.	Won vacant WBC lightweight title
59	Win	49–7–2 (1)	Jesús Chávez	UD	10	Dec 19, 2009	Arena ITSON, Ciudad Obregón, Mexico	
58	Win	48–7–2 (1)	Aristides Pérez	TKO	2 (12), 1:21	Sep 15, 2009	Plaza de Toros, Cancún, Mexico	Retained WBC super featherweight title
57	Win	47–7–2 (1)	Benoit Gaudet	TKO	9 (12), 2:25	May 2, 2009	MGM Grand Garden Arena, Paradise, Nevada, U.S.	Retained WBC super featherweight title
56	Win	46–7–2 (1)	Antonio Davis	TKO	4 (12), 2:38	Mar 28, 2009	Bullring by the Sea, Tijuana, Mexico	Retained WBC super featherweight title
55	Win	45–7–2 (1)	Francisco Lorenzo	UD	12	Dec 20, 2008	Parque Andrés Quintana Roo, Cozumel, Mexico	Won vacant WBC super featherweight title
54	Win	44–7–2 (1)	Gamaliel Díaz	RTD	11 (12), 0:10	Oct 11, 2008	Coliseo Centenario, Torreón, Mexico	Won vacant WBC interim super featherweight title
53	Loss	43–7–2 (1)	Francisco Lorenzo	DQ	4 (12), 2:43	Jun 28, 2008	Mandalay Bay Events Center, Paradise, Nevada, U.S.	For vacant WBC interim super featherweight title; Soto disqualified for hitting Lorenzo after a knockdown
52	Win	43–6–2 (1)	Carlos Urias	TKO	5 (10)	Mar 14, 2008	Auditorio Benito Juarez, Los Mochis, Mexico	
51	Loss	42–6–2 (1)	Joan Guzmán	UD	12	Nov 17, 2007	Borgata, Atlantic City, New Jersey, U.S.	For WBO super featherweight title
50	Win	42–5–2 (1)	Ismael González	TKO	3 (10), 0:25	Sep 14, 2007	Auditorio Benito Juarez, Los Mochis, Mexico	
49	Win	41–5–2 (1)	Bobby Pacquiao	KO	7 (10), 1:48	Jun 9, 2007	Madison Square Garden, New York City, New York, U.S.	
48	Win	40–5–2 (1)	Humberto Toledo	TKO	3 (12), 1:50	Feb 22, 2007	Mountaineer Casino Racetrack and Resort, Chester, West Virginia, U.S.	
47	Win	39–5–2 (1)	Ivan Valle	TKO	4 (12), 0:48	Aug 12, 2006	Thomas & Mack Center, Paradise, Nevada, U.S.	
46	Win	38–5–2 (1)	Oscar León	TKO	9 (12)	Feb 17, 2006	Estadio Emilio Ibarra Almada, Los Mochis, Mexico	Retained WBC interim featherweight title
45	Win	37–5–2 (1)	Ulises Duarte	KO	1 (10), 2:20	Oct 13, 2005	Hotel Villa Cahita, Los Mochis, Mexico	
44	Win	36–5–2 (1)	Rocky Juarez	UD	12	Aug 20, 2005	Allstate Arena, Rosemont, Illinois, U.S.	Won WBC interim featherweight title
43	Win	35–5–2 (1)	Ismael González	TKO	10 (10), 1:23	Dec 10, 2004	El Foro, Tijuana, Mexico	
42	NC	34–5–2 (1)	Jorge Solís	NC	3 (10), 3:00	Sep 17, 2004	The Orleans, Paradise, Nevada, U.S.	NC after Solís was cut from an accidental head clash
41	Win	34–5–2	Gerardo Zayas	TKO	6 (10), 1:41	Jul 12, 2004	Salon Las Pulgas, Tijuana, Mexico	
40	Win	33–5–2	Wilson Alcorro	TKO	6 (10), 1:23	May 28, 2004	Congress Theater, Chicago, Illinois, U.S.	
39	Win	32–5–2	Manny Rivero	KO	1 (10)	Apr 30, 2004	Isleta Resort & Casino, Albuquerque, New Mexico, U.S.	
38	Win	31–5–2	Oscar Galindo	TKO	3 (10)	Feb 16, 2004	Salon Las Pulgas, Tijuana, Mexico	
37	Win	30–5–2	James Baker	UD	10	Dec 12, 2003	Edgewater Hotel and Casino, Laughlin, Nevada, U.S.	
36	Win	29–5–2	Luís Fuente	UD	10	Sep 12, 2003	The Orleans, Paradise, Nevada, U.S.	
35	Win	28–5–2	Hector Mancina	UD	10	Aug 15, 2003	Los Mochis, Mexico	
34	Win	27–5–2	Armando Cordoba	UD	10	Jun 27, 2003	The Orleans, Paradise, Nevada, U.S.	
33	Win	26–5–2	Abel Sepulveda	TKO	4	Jun 6, 2003	Auditorio Municipal, Rosarito Beach, Mexico	
32	Win	25–5–2	César Figueroa	TKO	7 (10), 2:36	Feb 28, 2003	The Orleans, Paradise, Nevada, U.S.	
31	Win	24–5–2	Emidgio Gastelum	TKO	12 (12), 1:49	Nov 22, 2002	The Orleans, Paradise, Nevada, U.S.	Won vacant WBC FECARBOX lightweight title
30	Win	23–5–2	Juan Ruiz	KO	4	Nov 15, 2002	Los Mochis, Mexico	
29	Loss	22–5–2	Kevin Kelley	MD	12	Jul 13, 2002	The Aladdin, Paradise, Nevada, U.S.	For vacant WBA–NABA super featherweight title
28	Win	22–4–2	Ricardo Martínez	TKO	9 (10)	Jun 14, 2002	Auditorio Benito Juarez, Los Mochis, Mexico	
27	Win	21–4–2	Marco Angel Pérez	TKO	3 (8), 1:16	May 17, 2002	The Orleans, Paradise, Nevada, U.S.	
26	Win	20–4–2	Mark Burse	MD	10	Apr 26, 2002	Spa Resort Casino, Palm Springs, California, U.S.	
25	Win	19–4–2	Cristin Rojas	TKO	1	Mar 15, 2002	Los Mochis, Mexico	
24	Win	18–4–2	Sergio Sanchez	PTS	10	Dec 15, 2001	Ensenada, Mexico	
23	Win	17–4–2	Francisco Reyna	KO	1	Nov 24, 2001	Plaza de Toros, Ciudad Juárez, Mexico	
22	Win	16–4–2	Hector Guzman	TKO	5 (10)	Sep 28, 2001	Gimnasio Oscar García, Ensenada, Mexico	
21	Win	15–4–2	Jesus Escalante	TKO	5 (12)	Aug 17, 2001	Ensenada, Mexico	Won vacant WBA Fedecentro super bantamweight title
20	Win	14–4–2	Enrique Colin	KO	2 (12)	Mar 31, 2001	Guasave, Mexico	Won vacant WBC Youth super featherweight title
19	Loss	13–4–2	David Murillo	UD	10	Nov 3, 2000	Poliforo Juan Gabriel, Ciudad Juarez, Mexico	Lost WBC Youth featherweight title
18	Win	13–3–2	Ramon Valles	KO	1 (12)	Sep 1, 2000	Los Mochis, Mexico	Won vacant WBC Mundo Hispano featherweight title
17	Loss	12–3–2	Hector Javier Marquez	RTD	11 (12), 0:10	May 27, 2000	Arena México, Mexico City, Mexico	For vacant Mexico featherweight title
16	Win	12–2–2	Carlos Ramon Mairena	TKO	4 (10)	Mar 10, 2000	Salon Rodeo, Los Mochis, Mexico	Won vacant WBC Youth featherweight title
15	Win	11–2–2	Emidgio Gastelum	PTS	12	Dec 10, 1999	Salon Rodeo, Los Mochis, Mexico	Won vacant WBC FECARBOX featherweight title
14	Win	10–2–2	Dave Hinds	PTS	6	Nov 13, 1999	Sports Arena, Hull, England	
13	Draw	9–2–2	Emidgio Gastelum	TD	2 (12)	Sep 10, 1999	Forum "El Gran Salon", Los Mochis, Mexico	For vacant WBA–NABA featherweight title
12	Win	9–2–1	Ramon Aragon	PTS	8	Aug 27, 1999	Gimnasio Municipal "Jose Neri Santos", Ciudad Juárez, Mexico	
11	Win	8–2–1	Gerardo Zayas	TKO	11 (12)	Jul 2, 1999	Auditorio Benito Juarez, Los Mochis, Mexico	
10	Win	7–2–1	Jesus Escalante	KO	6 (10)	May 20, 1999	Salon Rodeo, Los Mochis, Mexico	Retained Mexican Pacific Coast featherweight title
9	Loss	6–2–1	Luiz Claudio Freitas	UD	10	Apr 2, 1999	Grand Hotel, Tijuana, Mexico	
8	Win	6–1–1	Ramon Valles	UD	10	Jan 29, 1999	Auditorio Benito Juarez, Los Mochis, Mexico	Won vacant Mexican Pacific Coast featherweight title
7	Win	5–1–1	Cayetano Romero	PTS	8	Jun 6, 1998	Mexico City, Mexico	
6	Loss	4–1–1	Angel Eduardo Mata	PTS	6	May 15, 1998	Auditorio Benito Juarez, Los Mochis, Mexico	
5	Win	4–0–1	Cayetano Romero	TKO	2	May 5, 1998	Lomas de Sotelo, Mexico City, Mexico	
4	Win	3–0–1	Carlos Rios	PTS	4	Mar 27, 1998	Ciudad Obregón, Mexico	
3	Win	2–0–1	Emidgio Gastelum	PTS	4	Dec 5, 1997	Ciudad Obregón, Mexico	
2	Draw	1–0–1	Ivan Gutierrez Valencia	PTS	4	Oct 24, 1997	Auditorio Benito Juarez, Los Mochis, Mexico	
1	Win	1–0	Guillermo Guerra	PTS	4	Sep 26, 1997	Auditorio Benito Juarez, Los Mochis, Mexico	

== Titles in boxing ==
=== Major world titles ===
- WBC super featherweight champion (130 lbs)
- WBC lightweight champion (135 lbs)

=== Interim world titles ===
- WBC interim featherweight champion (126 lbs)
- WBC interim super featherweight champion (130 lbs)

=== Minor world titles ===
- WBF (Federation) welterweight champion (147 lbs)

=== Regional/International titles ===
- Mexican Pacific Coast featherweight champion (126 lbs)
- WBC FECARBOX featherweight champion (126 lbs)
- WBC Youth featherweight champion (126 lbs)
- WBC Mundo Hispano featherweight champion (126 lbs)
- WBA Fedecentro super featherweight champion (130 lbs)
- WBC Mundo Youth super featherweight champion (130 lbs)
- WBC FECARBOX lightweight champion (135 lbs)
- WBC Silver International light welterweight champion (140 lbs)
- WBO-NABO light welterweight champion (140 lbs)

== See also ==
- List of Mexican boxing world champions

Sporting positions
World boxing titles
Vacant Title last held by Érik Morales	WBC featherweight champion Interim title August 20, 2005 – June 29, 2006; Vacated	Vacant Title next held by Jorge Linares
New title	WBC super featherweight champion Interim title October 11, 2008 – December 20, 2008; Won full title	Vacant Title next held by Humberto Mauro Gutiérrez
Vacant Title last held by Manny Pacquiao	WBC super featherweight champion December 20, 2008 – March 18, 2010; Vacated	Succeeded by Vitali Tajbert promoted from interim status
Vacant Title last held by Edwin Valero	WBC lightweight champion March 13, 2010 – July 1, 2011; Vacated	Vacant Title next held by Antonio DeMarco
