= Kim Ji-hoon (boxer) =

South Korean boxer (born 1987)

Personal information
- Nickname: Volcano
- Nationality: (South Korea) South Korean
- Born: January 17, 1987 (age 39) Goyang City, South Korea
- Height: 5 ft 9.5 in (1.77 m)
- Weight: Welterweight

Boxing career
- Stance: Orthodox

Boxing record
- Total fights: 34
- Wins: 25
- Win by KO: 19
- Losses: 9
- Draws: 0
- No contests: 0

- Kim Ji-hoon
- Hangul: 김지훈
- Hanja: 金智勲
- RR: Gim Jihun
- MR: Kim Chihun

Kim Ji-hoon (born January 17, 1987, Goyang City) is a South Korean super featherweight/lightweight boxer.

== Boxing career ==
"Volcano" Kim Ji-hoon began his boxing career in October 2004 in South Korea, winning eight of his first 12 fights. In July 2006, he fought his first match abroad at the International Conference Hall in Nagoya, Aichi, Japan, where he lost to Makyo Sugita by unanimous decision after 10 rounds.

In May 2008, he fought his first United States match in Las Vegas, Nevada, where he defeated Georgian born Koba Gogoladze by technical knockout in the first round. Kim survived a series of punishing blows from his opponent before knocking him down with a devastating left hook, ultimately finishing the match with a flurry of punches moments later. In March 2009, he fought his second U.S. fight in Laredo, Texas, defeating Gilbert Salinas by TKO in the eighth round.

On February 12, 2010, Kim fought national amateur champion Tyrone Harris as part of the Friday Night Fights main event. Kim won by TKO in the fifth round after the referee stopped the fight.

On May 21, 2010, Kim fought Ameth Díaz as part of the Friday Night Fights main event. Kim defeated Diaz by TKO in the first round at 2:59.

Kim lost his first fight in four years on August 15, 2010, to Miguel Vázquez for the vacant IBF Lightweight title by unanimous decision.

== Professional boxing record ==
34 fights	25 wins	9 losses
By knockout	19	2
By decision	6	7

No.	Result	Record	Opponent	Type	Round, time	Date	Location	Notes
34	Win	25–9	Roy Tua Manihuruk	TKO	3 (12), 0:57	20 Jul 2013	Yesan Highschool, Yesan, South Korea	Won vacant WBO Asia Pacific welterweight title
33	Loss	24–9	Mauricio Herrera	UD	10	2 May 2013	Omega Products International, Corona, California, U.S.	
32	Loss	24–8	Ray Beltrán	UD	10	6 Dec 2012	Mirage Hotel & Casino, Las Vegas, Nevada, U.S.	For WBC-NABF lightweight title
31	Win	24–7	Alisher Rahimov	UD	10	25 May 2012	Ameristar Casino, Saint Charles, Missouri, U.S.	
30	Win	23–7	Yakubu Amidu	UD	10	27 Jan 2012	Northern Quest Casino, Airway Heights, Washington, U.S.	
29	Win	22–7	Kim Dong-hyuk	SD	10	27 Feb 2011	Gymnasium, Mungyeong, South Korea	Won vacant South Korean lightweight title
28	Loss	21–7	Lenny Zappavigna	TKO	1 (12), 1:41	31 Oct 2010	Olympic Park Sports Centre, Sydney, Australia	
27	Loss	21–6	Miguel Vázquez	UD	12	14 Aug 2010	Laredo Energy Arena, Laredo, Texas, U.S.	Won vacant IBF lightweight title
26	Win	21–5	Ammeth Díaz	TKO	1 (12), 2:59	21 May 2010	Laredo Energy Arena, Laredo, Texas, U.S.	
25	Win	20–5	Tyron Harris	TKO	5 (10), 1:52	12 Feb 2010	Pechanga Resort & Casino, Temecula, California, U.S.	
24	Win	19–5	Zolani Marali	TKO	9 (12), 0:28	12 Sep 2009	Emperors Palace, Kempton Park, South Africa	Won IBO super featherweight title
23	Win	18–5	Yu In-soo	TKO	4 (6), 2:05	20 Jul 2009	Yangnam Spa, Ulsan, South Korea	
22	Win	17–5	Yum Hyung-joo	TKO	2 (4), 2:39	17 Apr 2009	I Park Mall, Seoul, South Korea	
21	Win	16–5	Gilbert Salinas	TKO	8 (8), 2:45	20 Mar 2009	Laredo Entertainment Center, Laredo, Texas, U.S.	
20	Win	15–5	Mo Jung-suk	KO	2 (4), 2:05	13 Dec 2008	Ramada Plaza Hotel, Jeju, South Korea	
19	Win	14–5	Koba Gogoladze	TKO	1 (6), 2:27	26 May 2008	Thomas & Mack Center, Paradise, Nevada, U.S.	
18	Win	13–5	Edward Apaap	KO	3 (12), 2:46	4 Nov 2007	Goyang High School of Arts, Goyang, South Korea	Retained WBA-PABA featherweight title
17	Win	12–5	Jung Jae-kwang	KO	6 (12), 2:07	1 Jul 2007	Oulim Nuri Arts Center, Goyang, South Korea	Retained WBA-PABA featherweight title
16	Win	11–5	Promboot Taweesin	KO	3 (12), 2:36	16 Dec 2006	Jeongeup Health Center, Jeongeup, South Korea	Retained WBA-PABA featherweight title
15	Win	10–5	Mark Sales	SD	12	29 Oct 2006	Dobong High School, Seoul, South Korea	Won vacant WBA-PABA featherweight title
14	Win	9–5	Bae Soo-myung	KO	2 (10), 1:42	7 Oct 2006	Oulim Nuri Arts Center, Goyang, South Korea	Retained South Korean featherweight title
13	Loss	8–5	Makyo Sugita	UD	10	16 Jul 2006	International Conference Hall, Nagoya, Japan	
12	Win	8–4	Lee Dong-kook	KO	5 (10), 2:09	22 Apr 2006	Shingoo University, Seongnam, South Korea	Retained South Korean featherweight title
11	Loss	7–4	Lim Heung-shik	UD	10	14 Dec 2005	Jeonju College, Jeonju, South Korea	
10	Win	7–3	Wuxiao Song	KO	6 (10), 0:10	27 Oct 2005	Jangchung Gymnasium, Seoul, South Korea	
9	Win	6–3	Kim Jung-hoon	KO	2 (10), 1:58	25 Sep 2005	Gyeongju Gymnasium, Gyeongju, South Korea	Won vacant South Korean featherweight title
8	Win	5–3	Nam Won-chang	PTS	8	15 Jul 2005	Shinheung University, Uijeongbu, South Korea	
7	Win	4–3	Bae Han-wook	KO	5 (8), 2:37	6 May 2005	Jangchung Gymnasium, Seoul, South Korea	
6	Win	3–3	Park Hoon-suk	PTS	6	2 Apr 2005	Chungmu Gymnasium, Daejeon, South Korea	
5	Loss	2–3	Yoon Byung-kyung	KO	1 (6), 0:37	26 Jan 2005	Dreamtower Club, Bucheon, South Korea	
4	Loss	2–2	Jo Joo-hwan	PTS	4	22 Dec 2004	Culture Hall, Muju, South Korea	
3	Win	2–1	Lee Woo-suk	KO	2 (4), 0:26	20 Dec 2004	Culture Hall, Muju, South Korea	
2	Win	1–1	Bae Han-wook	KO	2 (4), 2:22	24 Oct 2004	Chungmu Gymnasium, Daejeon, South Korea	
1	Loss	0–1	Woo Woo-sung	PTS	4	5 Oct 2004	Chungju Gymnasium, Chungju, South Korea	

Achievements
Preceded by Zolani Marali	IBO Super Featherweight Champion; September 12, 2009 – 2010	Vacant
