= Zolani Marali =

South African boxer (1977–2022)

Personal information
- Nickname: Untouchable
- Nationality: South African
- Born: 5 May 1977 Mdantsane, Eastern Cape, South Africa
- Died: 4 February 2022 (aged 44)
- Weight: Lightweight

Boxing career
- Stance: Southpaw

Boxing record
- Total fights: 30
- Wins: 24
- Win by KO: 13
- Losses: 6
- Draws: 0
- No contests: 0

Zolani Marali (5 May 1977 – 4 February 2022) was a South African lightweight boxer.

== Life and career ==
Marali was born in Eastern Cape, South Africa. Marali won a bronze medal in the flyweight category at the 1999 All-Africa Games in Johannesburg. In April 2009, he won the International Boxing Organization (IBO) superfeatherweight boxing title after defeating Gamaliel Diaz. He had previously won the titles for World Boxing Foundation super bantamweight and super featherweight as well as IBO super bantamweight.

Marali died on 4 February 2022, at the age of 44.

Titles in pretence
Vacant Title last held by Paulie Ayala	World Super Bantamweight Champion; IBO Recognition; 11 July 2003 – 22 May 2004	Succeeded by Thomas Mashaba
Vacant Title last held by Billy Dib	World Super Featherweight Champion; IBO Recognition; 2 April 2009 – 12 October 2009	Succeeded by Ji-Hoon Kim
