= Floyd Mayweather Jr. vs. Marcos Maidana II =

Boxing competition

Mayhem
- Date: September 13, 2014
- Venue: MGM Grand Garden Arena, Paradise, Nevada, U.S.
- Title(s) on the line: WBC light middleweight title, WBA (Unified), WBC, and The Ring welterweight titles

Tale of the tape
Boxer	Floyd Mayweather Jr.	Marcos Maidana
Nickname	Money	El Chino ("The Chinaman")
Hometown	Grand Rapids, Michigan, U.S.	Margarita, Santa Fe, Argentina
Purse	$32,000,000	$3,000,000
Pre-fight record	46–0 (26 KO)	35–4 (31 KO)
Age	37 years, 6 months	31 years, 1 month
Height	5 ft 8 in (173 cm)	5 ft 7 in (170 cm)
Weight	146 1/2 lb (66 kg)	146 lb (66 kg)
Style	Orthodox	Orthodox
Recognition	WBA (Unified), WBC, and The Ring; Welterweight Champion; TBRB; No. 1 Ranked Welterweight; WBA (Super), WBC, and The Ring; Light Middleweight Campion; The Ring No. 1 ranked pound-for-pound fighter 5-division world champion	WBA; No. 2 Ranked Welterweight; WBC; No. 3 Ranked Welterweight; The Ring/TBRB; No. 5 Ranked Welterweight; Former welterweight champion

Result
- Mayweather Jr. wins via 12-round unanimous decision (115-112, 116-111, 116-111)

Floyd Mayweather Jr. vs. Marcos Maidana II, billed as Mayhem, was a professional boxing match contested on September 13, 2014, for the WBC light middleweight title and the WBA, WBC, and The Ring welterweight championship.

== Background ==
The pair fought earlier that year at the MGM Grand. Despite the bout being closer than most Mayweather bouts, Mayweather won by Majority Decision. Maidana proved himself to be one of Floyd's tougher opponents. Therefore, the rematch seemed inevitable.

It was announced in July that rematch was to take place in September at the MGM Grand Garden Arena in Las Vegas, Nevada. Mayweather said at the time "I only see the outcome one way and that's another successful night for me and my team. I'm not one to give second chances in the ring, but I want to give the fans what they want to see. His style is difficult at best, but with experience comes a way and will to win."

== The fight ==
The fight was won by Mayweather via unanimous decision, with scores of 116-111 twice and 115–112.

== Aftermath ==
On December 12, Mayweather proposed a May 2015, long muted bout with Manny Pacquiao. They had twice before entered into negotiations, with Pacquiao pulling out in January 2010 and Mayweather refusing the bout in July 2010.

On January 13, Pacquiao agreed to terms for the fight. On January 30, TMZ reported that the fight had been agreed upon by both sides and that a formal announcement would be made in the "next couple of days." However, members from both sides, including Bob Arum and Stephen Espinoza, refuted the report, saying that the deal had not been finalized yet and that negotiations on what would be a joint pay-per-view (Showtime–HBO) telecast of the fight were still clearing out the last significant issues before the deal could be finalized.

On February 20, Mayweather announced that the fight was official and a contract had been signed for a fight to take place on May 2, at the MGM Grand.

This would the last bout of Maidana's career, he would announce his retirement two years later.

== Fight card ==
Confirmed bouts:

Weight Class		vs.		Method	Round	Time	Notes
Welterweight	(United States) Floyd Mayweather Jr. (c)	def.	(Argentina) Marcos Maidana	UD	12		^{Note 1}
Super Bantamweight	(Mexico) Léo Santa Cruz (c)	def.	(Mexico) Manuel Roman	TKO	2/12	0:55	^{Note 2}
Lightweight	(United States) Mickey Bey	def.	(Mexico) Miguel Vázquez (c)	SD	12		^{Note 3}
Middleweight	(Mexico) James de la Rosa	def.	(Mexico) Alfredo Angulo	UD	10
Preliminary bouts
Junior welterweight	(Mexico) Humberto Soto	def.	(United States) John Molina Jr.	UD	10		^{Note 4}
Non-TV bouts
Cruiserweight	(United States) Andrew Tabiti	def.	(United States) Caleb Grummet	TKO	6/6	2:01
Junior welterweight	(United States) Wilberth Lopez	def.	(Argentina) Damian Sosa	UD	6
Welterweight	(Argentina) Fabián Maidana	def.	(United States) Jared Teer	TKO	1/4	2:07
Super middleweight	(United States) Kevin Newman II	vs.	(Tajikistan) Azamat Umarzoda	SD	4

^Note 1 for WBA (Super), WBC and The Ring welterweight titles; WBC and The Ring super welterweight titles
^Note 2 For WBC super bantamweight title
^Note 3 For IBF lightweight title
^Note 4 For NABO light welterweight title

== Broadcasting ==
Country	Broadcaster
Australia	Main Event
Hungary	Sport 1
New Zealand	Sky Arena
Panama	RPC-TV
Philippines	TV5
United Kingdom	BoxNation
United States	Showtime PPV

Preceded by First bout	Floyd Mayweather Jr.'s bouts 13 September 2014	Succeeded by vs. Manny Pacquiao
Preceded by First bout	Marcos Maidana's bouts 13 September 2014	Retired
