= Koba Gogoladze =

Georgian boxer

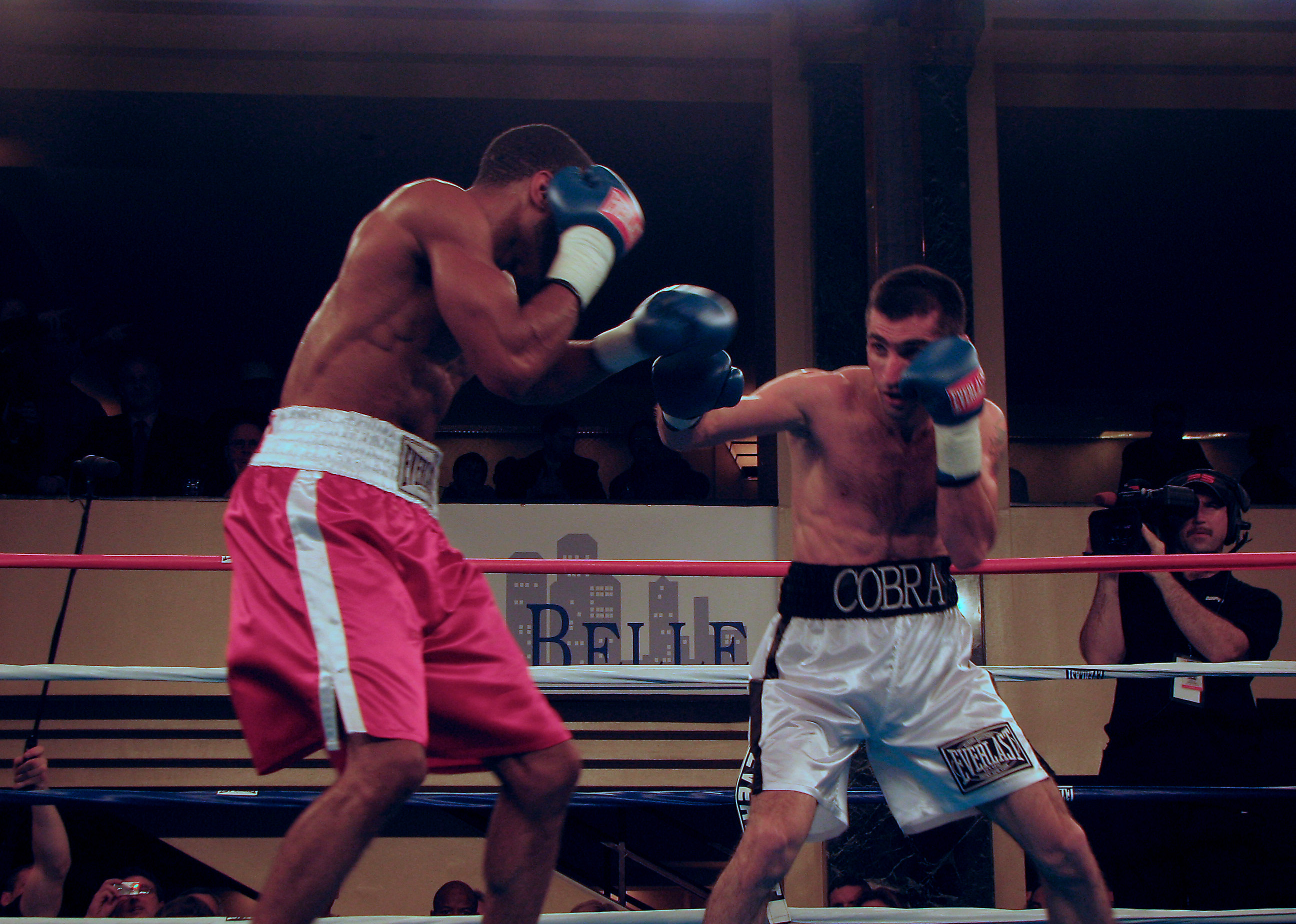
- Koba Gogoladze (right) versus Antonio Davis (left)

Personal information
- Nickname: The Cobra
- Nationality: Georgian
- Born: კობა გოგოლაძე January 7, 1973 (age 53) Poti, Georgian SSR, Soviet Union
- Weight: Super Featherweight

Boxing career
- Stance: Southpaw

Boxing record
- Total fights: 23
- Wins: 20
- Win by KO: 8
- Losses: 3
- Draws: 0
- No contests: 0

Koba Gogoladze (Georgian: კობა გოგოლაძე; born January 7, 1973, in Poti, Samegrelo-Zemo Svaneti) is a professional boxer from Georgia. He competed in the 1996 Summer Olympics as a lightweight, losing on points in the quarterfinals to Leonard Doroftei.

== Olympic career ==
Koba Gogoladze
Medal record

Representing Georgia

Men's Boxing

World Amateur Championships
Bronze medal – third place	1997 Budapest	Lightweight

European Amateur Championships
Silver medal – second place	1998 Minsk	Lightweight

- 1996 Lightweight competitor at Olympic Games in Atlanta, United States. Results were:
  1. First Round — Defeated Ri Chol (North Korea), 17-9
  2. Second Round — Defeated Julio Gonzalez Valladares (Cuba), 14-9
  3. Quarter Finals — Lost to Leonard Doroftei (Romania), 8-17

== Professional career ==
Gogoladze turned professional in 1999, boxing mainly in England, although he did also fight once in Cyprus (winning the minor World Boxing Federation (WBF) International Lightweight title) and twice in his native Georgia. He took two years off, and moved to Philadelphia. He faced stiffer competition in the US, recording his first loss against Almazbek Raiymkulov. After two more bouts, he faced Scotland's Alex Arthur for the interim WBO title where he was stopped by a 10th round TKO. A final loss, to Ji-Hoon Kim, this time a 1st round TKO, closed out his career.
