= Carlos Urías =

Mexican boxer (born 1975)

Personal information
- Nickname: El Toro
- Born: 1 January 1975 (age 51) Los Mochis, Sinaloa, Mexico
- Height: 1.82 m (6 ft 0 in)
- Weight: Welterweight; Light welterweight Lightweight

Boxing career
- Reach: 189 cm (74 in)
- Stance: Orthodox

Boxing record
- Total fights: 76
- Wins: 47
- Win by KO: 36
- Losses: 28
- Draws: 1
- No contests: 0

Carlos Urías (born 1 January 1975) is a Mexican professional boxer. He's the former WBA Fedebol, WBA Fedecentro, and WBC FECOMBOX lightweight Champion.

== Professional career ==
On March 14, 2008, Urías lost to Humberto Soto at the Auditorio Benito Juárez in Los Mochis.

In June 2008, Urías beat the veteran José Luis Soto Karass by T.K.O. to win the WBA Fedecentro lightweight title.
