= Marco Angel Pérez =

Mexican boxer (born 1977)

Marco Ángel Pérez
Personal information
- Nickname: AR-15
- Born: Marco Ángel Pérez; 27 September 1977 (age 48) Culiacán, Sinaloa, Mexico
- Height: 5 ft 10 in (178 cm)
- Weight: Light Middleweight; Welterweight; Light Welterweight; Super Featherweight

Boxing career
- Reach: 72 in (183 cm)
- Stance: Orthodox

Boxing record
- Total fights: 36
- Wins: 25
- Win by KO: 15
- Losses: 11
- Draws: 0
- No contests: 0

Marco Ángel Pérez (born 27 September 1977) is a Mexican former professional boxer who competed from 1996 to 2012. He held the WBC FECARBOX super featherweight title.

== Professional career ==
=== WBC FECARBOX title ===
In July 1999, Pérez upset the veteran Ernesto Benitez by T.K.O. to win the WBC FECARBOX Super Featherweight Championship.

On 17 May 2002 Marco Angel lost to Mexican Humberto Soto, the bout was at the Orleans Hotel and Casino in Las Vegas, Nevada.
