= Humberto Toledo =

Ecuadorian boxer

Personal information
- Nickname: Bam Baby
- Born: Humberto Toledo Valverde; August 10, 1979 (age 46) Esmeraldas, Ecuador
- Height: 5 ft 7.5 in (1.71 m)
- Weight: Light Welterweight; Lightweight; Super Featherweight; Featherweight

Boxing career
- Reach: 72 in (184 cm)
- Stance: Orthodox

Boxing record
- Total fights: 60
- Wins: 42
- Win by KO: 25
- Losses: 15
- Draws: 3

Humberto Toledo Valverde (born August 10, 1979) is an Ecuadorian professional boxer. He's the former WBC Latino Super Featherweight and is the current WBC FECARBOX Lightweight champion.

== Professional career ==
In February 2007, Toledo lost to future three-time WBC champion Humberto Soto.

=== WBC FECARBOX Lightweight Championship ===
On October 16, 2009, Humberto beat Samir Torres to win the WBC FECARBOX Lightweight Championship.
