= Oscar Meza =

Mexican boxer (born 1986)

Personal information
- Nickname: Estudiante
- Nationality: (Mexico) Mexican
- Born: Oscar Meza; December 5, 1986 (age 39) El Dorado, Sinaloa, Mexico
- Height: 5 ft 10 in (180 cm)
- Weight: Light Welterweight

Boxing career
- Reach: 72 in (183 cm)
- Stance: Orthodox

Boxing record
- Total fights: 36
- Wins: 28
- Win by KO: 23
- Losses: 8
- Draws: 0
- No contests: 0

Oscar Meza (born December 5, 1986, in El Dorado, Sinaloa, Mexico) is a Mexican professional boxer in the Light Welterweight division.

== Pro career ==
On September 12, 2009, Meza lost to the Mexican American Brandon Rios in Buffalo Bill's Star Arena, Primm, Nevada.

Oscar lost to Mercito Gesta and his chance at the vacant WBO NABO Youth Lightweight Championship, in A La Carte Event Pavilion, Tampa, Florida.

He is also an audio engineer.
