= Frédéric Julan =

French boxer (born 1988)

Fred Julan
Personal information
- Nationality: French
- Born: Frédéric Julan; June 8, 1988 (age 38) Paris, France
- Height: 5 ft 10 in (178 cm)
- Weight: Light heavyweight

Boxing career
- Stance: Southpaw

Boxing record
- Total fights: 12
- Wins: 12
- Win by KO: 10
- Losses: 0

Frédéric (Fred) Julan (born June 8, 1988) is a French professional boxer. As an amateur, he became the first French boxer to win the Daily News New York Golden Gloves tournament in novice, having won it in both 2013 and 2015. He is also the founder of BoxingCulture.com a support platform for Boxers.

== Amateur career ==
Julan started boxing at the age of 16 at the ME Boxing Club in Emerainville under the tutelage of Malek Ikhenache who predicted, "If he [Julan] continues to work hard, he will one day go to New York to become world champion."

Julan arrived in New York in September 2012 and began training with Simon Bakinde in pursuit of the 2013 New York Golden Gloves which he won the following April, defeating Jesse Jezina in the final. Julan won the 178 Open Class division again in 2015 (against Patrick Aristhene) making him one of the few boxers to have won the competition more than once.

== Professional career ==
Julan made his professional debut in 2016 scoring a four-round unanimous decision against Damian Lewis in Queens, New York.

== Professional boxing record ==
12 fights	12 wins	0 losses
By knockout	10	0
By decision	2	0

No.	Result	Record	Opponent	Type	Round, time	Date	Location	Notes
12	Win	12–0	(Colombia) Fidel Muñoz	KO	2 (6), 0:38	25 Jan 2020	(United States) CURE Insurance Arena, Trenton, New Jersey, U.S.	
11	Win	11–0	(Colombia) Milton Núñez	RTD	4 (8), 3:00	23 Mar 2019	(United States) Showboat Atlantic City, Atlantic City, New Jersey, U.S.	
10	Win	10–0	(United States) Eric Abraham	TKO	2 (6), 2:29	9 Jun 2018	(United States) Kings Theatre, New York City, New York, U.S.	
9	Win	9–0	(Puerto Rico) Edgar Perez	RTD	3 (6), 3:00	24 Feb 2018	(United States) Showboat Atlantic City, Atlantic City, New Jersey, U.S.	
8	Win	8–0	(United States) Victor Barragan	TKO	6 (6), 2:45	16 Dec 2017	(United States) Plainridge Park Casino, Plainville, Massachusetts, U.S.	
7	Win	7–0	(United States) Willis Lockett	TKO	5 (6), 3:00	18 Nov 2017	(United States) The Claridge Hotel, Atlantic City, New Jersey, U.S.	
6	Win	6–0	(United States) Tahlik Taylor	TKO	6 (6), 1:15	19 Aug 2017	(United States) The Claridge Hotel, Atlantic City, New Jersey, U.S.	
5	Win	5–0	(Puerto Rico) Jose Valderrama	TKO	6 (6), 1:17	10 Jun 2017	(United States) The Claridge Hotel, Atlantic City, New Jersey, U.S.	
4	Win	4–0	(United States) Jermaine Corley	TKO	4 (4), 2:51	23 Mar 2017	(United States) The Skylands, Randolph, New Jersey, U.S.	
3	Win	3–0	(United States) Lanny Dardar	SD	4	15 Oct 2016	(United States) Memorial Hall, Melrose, Massachusetts, U.S.	
2	Win	2–0	(United States) Ralph Johnson	TKO	2 (4), 2:35	17 Sep 2016	(United States) Bank of New Hampshire Pavilion, Gilford, New Hampshire, U.S.	
1	Win	1–0	(United States) Damian Lewis	UD	4	Jul 22, 2016	(United States) 5 Star Banquet Hall, New York City, New York, U.S.	

== Boxing Culture ==
In July 2020, Frederic with the help of Nora Ikhenache, (Daughter of Malek Ikhenache) - developed Boxing Culture, a platform dedicated to supporting and accompanying Boxers during their career, along with the Boxing Culture Podcast which he hosts.
