= Fidel Monterrosa =

Colombian boxer (born 1988)

Fidel Muñoz
Personal information
- Nickname: El Ecatepec
- Nationality: Colombian
- Born: Fidel Alexander Monterrosa Muñoz; 25 July 1988 (age 37) Galapa, Colombia
- Height: 5 ft 10 in (1.78 m)
- Weight: Welterweight; Light welterweight Lightweight

Boxing career
- Reach: 72 in (183 cm)
- Stance: Orthodox

Boxing record
- Total fights: 80
- Wins: 43
- Win by KO: 35
- Losses: 35
- Draws: 1
- No contests: 1

Fidel Alexander Monterrosa Muñoz (born 25 July 1988) is a Colombian professional boxer who challenged for the WBC lightweight title in 2010.

== Professional career ==
In August 2008, Muñoz beat the undefeated Oscar Cuero to win the Colombian National lightweight title.

On 18 September 2010, Muñoz lost to WBC lightweight champion Humberto Soto over twelve rounds.

== Professional boxing record ==
80 fights	43 wins	35 losses
By knockout	35	31
By decision	8	4
Draws	1	
No contests	1	

No.	Result	Record	Opponent	Type	Round, time	Date	Location	Notes
80	Loss	43–35–1 (1)	Mikey Dahlman	TKO	2 (8), 0:29	17 May 2024	Club La Pradera, Carmen de Apicalá, Colombia	
79	Win	43–34–1 (1)	Carlos Quintero	KO	4 (6), 2:13	9 Apr 2024	Coliseo de Pescaito David Ruiz Ureche, Santa Marta, Colombia	
78	Win	42–34–1 (1)	Esneider Álvarez	TKO	4 (6), 1:15	2 Apr 2024	Coliseo de Pescaito David Ruiz Ureche, Santa Marta, Colombia	
77	Loss	41–34–1 (1)	José Muñoz	TKO	6 (8), 2:18	20 Dec 2023	Coliseo Menor de Villa Olímpica, Santa Marta, Colombia	
76	Loss	41–33–1 (1)	Laurent Humes	TKO	3 (6), 1:19	10 Feb 2023	Palladium, Worcester, Massachusetts, U.S.	For vacant UBF All America super-middleweight title
75	Loss	41–32–1 (1)	Tyrell Boyd	TKO	2 (6), 2:20	19 Nov 2022	Entertainment and Sports Arena, Washington, D.C., U.S.	
74	Loss	41–31–1 (1)	Steve Geffrard	TKO	1 (10), 2:03	8 Oct 2022	Tennis Center, Delray Beach, Florida, U.S.	
73	Loss	41–30–1 (1)	Elvis Figueroa	KO	2 (8), 2:00	20 Aug 2022	Cancha Rubén Zayas Montañez, Trujillo Alto, Puerto Rico	
72	Win	41–29–1 (1)	Eddy Julio	KO	3 (8), 0:50	30 Jul 2022	Club Aníbal González, Cartagena, Colombia	
71	Loss	40–29–1 (1)	Richard Rivera	KO	3 (10), 1:42	29 Apr 2022	AIC Gymnasium, Springfield, Massachusetts, U.S.	
70	Win	40–28–1 (1)	Mikey Dahlman	TKO	2 (6), 1:38	2 Apr 2022	Civic Center, Hammond, Indiana, U.S.	
69	Loss	39–28–1 (1)	Money Powell IV	KO	2 (6), 0:58	26 Feb 2022	International Convention Center, Atlanta, Georgia, U.S.	
68	Loss	39–27–1 (1)	Anthony Hines	UD	6	29 Oct 2021	Memorial Hall, Melrose, Massachusetts, U.S.	For American Boxing Federation Atlantic middleweight title
67	Loss	39–26–1 (1)	Rayton Okwiri	KO	2 (8), 2:03	14 Aug 2021	Thompson's Point Brich South, Portland, Maine, U.S.	
66	Loss	39–25–1 (1)	Akil Frederick	TKO	2 (6), 0:47	12 Jun 2021	Kentucky Center for African-American Heritage, Louisville, Kentucky, U.S.	
65	Loss	39–24–1 (1)	Sean Hemphill	TKO	2 (8), 2:59	18 Apr 2021	Revel, Atlanta, Georgia, U.S.	
64	Loss	39–23–1 (1)	Cecil McCalla	TKO	2 (6), 2:31	16 Oct 2020	Whitesands Events Center, Plant City, Florida, U.S.	
63	Loss	39–22–1 (1)	Frédéric Julan	KO	2 (6), 0:38	25 Jan 2020	Sun National Bank Center, Trenton, New Jersey, U.S.	
62	Loss	39–21–1 (1)	Dervin Colina	TKO	2 (6), 2:58	18 Dec 2019	Centro Comercial Gran Boulevard, Barranquilla, Colombia	
61	Loss	39–20–1 (1)	Carlos Monroe	KO	3 (8), 2:38	20 Apr 2019	Greensboro, North Carolina, U.S.	
60	Loss	39–19–1 (1)	James DeGale	KO	3 (8), 2:57	30 Sep 2018	Citizens Business Bank Arena, Ontario, California, U.S.	
59	Win	39–18–1 (1)	Oney Valdez	KO	4 (6), 1:11	10 Aug 2018	Coliseo Luis Patrón Rosano, Santiago de Tolú, Colombia	
58	Loss	38–18–1 (1)	Brandon Quarles	TKO	5 (6), 2:01	19 May 2018	MGM National Harbor, Oxon Hill, Maryland, U.S.	
57	Loss	38–17–1 (1)	Rashidi Ellis	TKO	4 (8), 1:33	24 Mar 2018	Complejo Ferial, Ponce, Puerto Rico	
56	Loss	38–16–1 (1)	Ivan Golub	TKO	3 (6), 2:48	20 Jan 2018	Barclays Center, Brooklyn, New York, U.S.	
55	Loss	38–15–1 (1)	Frederick Lawson	RTD	3 (8), 3:00	18 Nov 2017	Resorts World Casino, Queens, New York, U.S.	
54	Loss	38–14–1 (1)	Lenny Zappavigna	TKO	3 (8), 2:48	22 Sep 2017	Convention Center, Tucson, Arizona, U.S.	
53	Win	38–13–1 (1)	Tommy Rainone	UD	6	15 Jul 2017	Nassau Coliseum, Uniondale, New York, U.S.	
52	Win	37–13–1 (1)	Carlos Leal	KO	1 (8), 2:58	21 Oct 2016	Coliseo Mayor de Santa Marta, Santa Marta, Colombia	
51	Win	36–13–1 (1)	Ivan Pereyra	UD	10	1 Jul 2016	Auditorio Municipal, Torreón, Mexico	
50	Loss	35–13–1 (1)	Adrián Torres	KO	9 (10), 2:29	18 Dec 2015	Arena José Sulaimán, Monterrey, Mexico	
49	Win	35–12–1 (1)	Raúl Mosquera	KO	2 (8), 1:35	17 Apr 2015	Gimnasio Jorge García Beltrán, Barranquilla, Colombia	
48	Loss	34–12–1 (1)	Aristides Quintero	TKO	4 (10), 1:34	19 Dec 2014	Gimnasio Los Naranjos, Boquete, Panama	
47	Loss	34–11–1 (1)	Mario Meraz	KO	4 (12), 2:54	7 Nov 2014	Gimnasio Oscar 'Tigre' Garcia, Ensenada, Mexico	
46	Win	34–10–1 (1)	Julio Cardozo	TKO	1 (8), 2:45	19 Sep 2014	Centro Recreacional Las Vegas, Barranquilla, Colombia	
45	Win	33–10–1 (1)	Joel Casiani	TKO	3 (8), 2:15	7 Sep 2014	Gimnasio Cuadrilatero, Barranquilla, Colombia	
44	Loss	32–10–1 (1)	Kanat Islam	KO	5 (11), 2:50	7 Aug 2014	Estudios de Telecaribe, Barranquilla, Colombia	WBA Fedelatin light-middleweight title only at stake Islam as Monterrosa misses weight
43	Win	32–9–1 (1)	Óscar Carillo Villa	KO	2 (8), 2:30	7 Jun 2014	Gimnasio Jorge García Beltrán, Barranquilla, Colombia	
42	Loss	31–9–1 (1)	Alberto Mosquera	KO	5 (8), 2:59	20 Feb 2014	Centro de Convenciones Figali, Panama City, Panama	
41	Loss	31–8–1 (1)	Antonio DeMarco	TKO	5 (10), 1:21	10 Aug 2013	Arena Tecate, Tijuana, Mexico	
40	Win	31–7–1 (1)	Álvaro Vargas	TKO	2 (8), 1:50	28 Jun 2013	Centro Recreacional Las Vegas, Barranquilla, Colombia	
39	Win	30–7–1 (1)	Jhon Merino	KO	2 (8), 2:34	15 Jun 2013	Barrio San Isidro, Barranquilla, Colombia	
38	Draw	29–7–1 (1)	Miguel Ángel Mendoza	TD	3 (10)	10 May 2013	Coliseo Bernardo Caraballo, Cartagena, Colombia	
37	Loss	29–7 (1)	Roberto Ortiz	TD	6 (12)	16 Dec 2013	Domo Deportivo, Tulum, Mexico	Majority TD: Bout stopped due to Monterrosa's cut having worsened; For vacant WBC Silver welterweight title
36	NC	29–6 (1)	Alberto Mosquera	NC	10	17 Nov 2012	Fantastic Casino de Albrook Mall, Panama City, Panama	For vacant WBC Latino light-welterweight title; Originally a UD win for Mosquera, changed the result to no decision after Mosquera tested for Marijuana drug test
35	Loss	29–6	Pablo César Cano	KO	9 (10), 1:08	26 May 2012	Oasis Hotel Complex, Cancún, Mexico	
34	Win	29–5	Dunis Liñán	KO	5 (8)	30 Mar 2012	Coliseo Bernardo Caraballo, Cartagena, Colombia	
33	Win	28–5	Óscar Carillo Villa	TKO	4 (8), 2:39	22 Dec 2011	Gimnasio Jorge García Beltrán, Barranquilla, Colombia	
32	Loss	27–5	Claudio Alfredo Olmedo	KO	4 (10), 1:38	9 Dec 2011	Sálon de los Bomberos Voluntarios, General Villegas, Argentina	
31	Win	27–4	Julio Gómez	KO	1 (8), 1:05	18 Nov 2011	Coliseo Elías Chegwin, Barranquilla, Colombia	
30	Loss	26–4	Fernando Castañeda	KO	8 (10), 2:05	16 Jul 2011	Lobodome, Mazatlán, Mexico	For vacant WBC Youth light-welterweight title
29	Win	26–3	Jhon Merino	TKO	3 (8), 2:09	25 May 2011	Gimnasio Jorge García Beltrán, Barranquilla, Colombia	
28	Loss	25–3	Humberto Soto	UD	10	5 Mar 2011	Palenque de la Feria, Tepic, Mexico	
27	Win	25–2	Dunis Liñán	SD	8	28 Jan 2011	Centro Recreacional Las Vegas, Barranquilla, Colombia	
26	Win	24–2	Julio Gómez	TKO	1 (8), 1:23	13 Nov 2010	Plazoleta de Tecnicor, Barranquilla, Colombia	
25	Loss	23–2	Humberto Soto	UD	12	18 Sep 2010	Estadio Banorte, Culiacán, Mexico	For WBC lightweight title
24	Win	23–1	Óscar Carillo Villa	TKO	4 (10), 1:22	30 Apr 2010	Coliseo Gaira, Santa Marta, Colombia	
23	Win	22–1	Jesús Pérez	TKO	7 (10), 2:02	4 Feb 2010	Coliseo Kid Dumlop, Santa Marta, Colombia	
22	Win	21–1	Franklin Arroyo	TKO	1 (10), 1:55	27 Oct 2009	Coliseo Kid Dumlop, Santa Marta, Colombia	
21	Win	20–1	Edwin Reyes	KO	1 (6)	3 Oct 2009	Estadio Metropolitano, Barranquilla, Colombia	
20	Loss	19–1	Ali Chebah	RTD	4 (10), 3:00	3 Jul 2009	Palais des sports Marcel-Cerdan, Paris, France	For WBC Youth and WBC-NABF light-welterweight titles
19	Win	19–0	Edwin Ortiz	KO	2 (8), 2:48	17 Apr 2009	Centro Recreacional Las Vegas, Barranquilla, Colombia	
18	Win	18–0	Edwin Ortiz	KO	2 (8), 1:50	2 Dec 2008	Centro Recreacional Las Vegas, Barranquilla, Colombia	
17	Wim	17–0	Efran Arroyo	KO	2 (8), 1:40	14 Nov 2008	Parque del Barrio San Martín, Magangué, Colombia	
16	Win	16–0	Manuel Padilla	SD	8	23 Oct 2008	Cebtro Recreacional Las Vegas, Barranquilla, Colombia	
15	Win	15–0	Óscar Cuero	TKO	6 (10), 1:59	1 Aug 2008	Centro Recreacional Las Vegas, Barranquilla, Colombia	Won vacant Colombian lightweight title
14	Win	14–0	Julio Cardozo	KO	1 (4)	5 Jul 2008	Barrio El Carmen, Barranquilla, Colombia	
13	Win	13–0	José Batista	TKO	5 (6), 1:55	20 Jun 2008	Cebtro Recreacional Las Vegas, Barranquilla, Colombia	
12	Win	12–0	Freddy Barrios	KO	2 (8)	17 Nay 2008	Estadio Tomás Suri Salcedo, Barranquilla, Colombia	
11	Win	11–0	Wilmer Santana	KO	2 (8)	3 Apr 2008	Centro Recreacional Las Vegas, Barranquilla, Colombia	
10	Win	10–0	Luis Cardozo	UD	10	20 Dec 2007	Centro Recreacional Las Vegas, Barranquilla, Colombia	
9	Win	9–0	Luis Cardozo	UD	8	16 Nov 2007	Centro Recreacional Las Vegas, Barranquilla, Colombia	
8	Win	8–0	Daniel Mercado	TKO	2 (8)	21 Oct 2007	Gimnasio Kid Dumlop, Santa Marta, Colombia	
7	Win	7–0	Carlos Mercado	KO	2 (6)	10 Aug 2007	Centro Recreacional Las Vegas, Barranquilla, Colombia	
6	Win	6–0	José Orozco	PTS	4	16 Jul 2007	Coliseo Humberto Perea, Barranquilla, Colombia	
5	Win	5–0	Luis Ramos	KO	1 (4)	13 Apr 2007	Centro Recreacional Las Vegas, Barranquilla, Colombia	
4	Win	4–0	Enrique Rivera	PTS	4	16 Mar 2006	Centro Recreacional Las Vegas, Barranquilla, Colombia	
3	Win	3–0	Edwin Reyes	KO	2 (4)	2 Feb 2007	Centro Recreacional Las Vegas, Barranquilla, Colombia	
2	Win	2–0	José Orozco	KO	2 (4)	15 Dec 2006	Centro Recreacional Las Vegas, Barranquilla, Colombia	
1	Win	1–0	Miguel Ángel Suárez	KO	2 (4)	24 Nov 2006	Centro Recreacional Las Vegas, Barranquilla, Colombia	
