= Mickey Bey =

American boxer

Personal information
- Nickname: The Spirit
- Nationality: American
- Born: Mickey Bey Jr. June 27, 1983 (age 43) Cleveland, Ohio, U.S.
- Height: 5 ft 9 in (175 cm)
- Weight: Lightweight

Boxing career
- Reach: 69 in (175 cm)
- Stance: Orthodox

Boxing record
- Total fights: 28
- Wins: 23
- Win by KO: 11
- Losses: 3
- Draws: 1
- No contests: 1

Mickey Bey Jr. (born June 27, 1983) is an American professional boxer and former IBF lightweight champion.

== Professional career ==
=== Bey vs. Rodriguez ===
On February 2, 2013, Bey defeated Robert Rodríguez by third-round knockout, but tested positive for testosterone in the post-fight drug test. He was fined $1,000 and suspended for three months.

=== Bey vs. Vazquez ===
On September 13, 2014, Bey defeated Miguel Vázquez by twelfth-round split decision to win the IBF lightweight title, his first world title. This bout was on the card of Floyd Mayweather Jr. vs. Marcos Maidana II.

=== Vacating the IBF lightweight title ===
Bey was scheduled to face Denis Shafikov as his first defence, on April 30, as an ESPN2 main event in Las Vegas. Moretti and Leonard Ellerbe of Mayweather Promotions were even able to make a deal for the bout despite the poor relationship between the companies. However, Bey ultimately turned down a purse of about $200,000, and the bout was cancelled on short notice. The bout was then put up for a purse bid, and Top Rank, the only bidder, won the promotional rights with an offer of $78,000.

Although Bey signed a contract to go to Macau, China, to make a mandatory defence of his lightweight world title against Shafikov on July 18, he has again backed out of the fight and the vacated the title on July 3, 2015, having failed to defend the title once. Whilst he did ultimately vacate the title the IBF were on the verge of stripping him for failing to meet his contractual obligation to face his mandatory challenger.

=== Bey vs. Barthelemy ===
Bey fought Rances Barthelemy on 3 June 2016, for the IBF lightweight championship of the world. Barthelemy won by split decision. The scorecards were announced as 117-110, 110-117, 116-111 in favor of Barthelemy.

=== Bey vs. Kambosos Jnr ===
George Kambosos Jnr fought Bey on 14 December 2019 at Madison Square Garden in New York. Kambosos Jnr won by split decision in their 10 round contest. The scorecards were announced as 94-95, 97-92, 96-93 in favor of Kambosos Jnr.

== Professional boxing record ==
30 fights	25 wins	3 losses
By knockout	13	1
By decision	12	2
Draws	1	
No contests	1	

No.	Result	Record	Opponent	Type	Round, time	Date	Location	Notes
30	Win	25–3–1 (1)	Javier Rodriguez Lepe	TKO	2 (8)	2024-05-25	San Francisco del Rincon, Guanajuato, Mexico	
29	Win	24–3–1 (1)	Francisco Bonilla Zambrano	KO	2 (4)	2023-10-28	Chihuahua, Mexico	
28	Loss	23–3–1 (1)	George Kambosos Jr.	SD	10 (10)	2019-12-14	Madison Square Garden, New York City	
27	Win	23–2–1 (1)	Luis Humberto Valdivia	TKO	1 (8)	2018-09-21	Cheer's Bar, Tijuana	
26	Loss	22–2–1 (1)	Rances Barthelemy	SD	12 (12)	2016-06-03	Hard Rock Live, Hollywood	For IBF lightweight title
25	Win	22–1–1 (1)	Naim Nelson	UD	10 (10)	2015-12-18	Palms Casino Resort, Las Vegas	
24	Win	21–1–1 (1)	Miguel Vázquez	SD	12 (12)	2014-09-13	MGM Grand Garden Arena, Las Vegas	Won IBF lightweight title
23	Win	20–1–1 (1)	Alan Herrera	UD	10 (10)	2014-05-02	The Joint, Las Vegas	
22	Win	19–1–1 (1)	Carlos Cardenas	TKO	3 (10)	2013-12-06	Little Creek Casino Resort, Shelton	
21	Loss	18–1–1 (1)	John Molina Jr.	TKO	10 (10)	2013-07-19	The Joint, Las Vegas	
20	NC	18–0–1 (1)	Robert Rodríguez	KO	3 (10)	2013-02-02	The Cosmopolitan, Chelsea Ballroom, Las Vegas	Result overturned
19	Win	18–0–1	Héctor Velázquez	UD	8 (8)	2011-11-19	NRG Arena, Houston	
18	Win	17–0–1	Alejandro Rodriguez	TKO	4 (8)	2011-07-01	Freeman Coliseum, San Antonio	
17	Draw	16–0–1	Jose Hernandez	MD	8 (8)	2011-02-19	Mandalay Bay Events Center, Las Vegas	
16	Win	16–0	Eric Cruz	UD	6 (6)	2010-11-06	MGM Grand Garden Arena, Las Vegas	
15	Win	15–0	Tyrone Wiggins	KO	1 (6)	2009-12-19	Cotton Eyed Joe, Knoxville	
14	Win	14–0	Michaelangelo Lynks	UD	6 (6)	2009-10-10	Arena Theatre, Houston	
13	Win	13–0	Rashad Ganaway	SD	8 (8)	2009-08-22	Toyota Center, Houston	
12	Win	12–0	Miguel Angel Munguia	KO	1 (4)	2008-10-24	Morongo Casino Resort & Spa, Cabazon	
11	Win	11–0	Wilson Alcorro	UD	10 (10)	2008-05-17	Buffalo Bill's Star Arena, Primm	
10	Win	10–0	Roberto Acevedo	UD	8 (8)	2008-02-01	Grand Casino Hinckley, Hinckley	
9	Win	9–0	Castulo Gonzalez	TKO	2 (8)	2007-10-05	Omega Products International, Corona	
8	Win	8–0	Jose Magallon	KO	6 (6)	2007-09-01	Emerald Queen Casino, Tacoma	
7	Win	7–0	Felisiberto Fernandes	TKO	5 (6)	2007-06-09	Connecticut Convention Center, Hartford	
6	Win	6–0	Michael Mendez	KO	1 (6)	2007-04-07	Shrine Mosque, Springfield	
5	Win	5–0	Odilon Rivera Meza	UD	6 (6)	2007-02-02	Chumash Casino Resort, Santa Ynez	
4	Win	4–0	Tomondre King	UD	4 (4)	2005-12-17	The Palace, Auburn Hills	
3	Win	3–0	Lamont Sims	TKO	1 (4)	2005-10-01	Amalie Arena, Tampa	
2	Win	2–0	Hector de la Cruz	UD	4 (4)	2005-07-21	The Fonda Theatre, Los Angeles	
1	Win	1–0	Shane Gierke	KO	1 (4)	2005-04-29	Wolstein Center, Cleveland	

== See also ==
- List of lightweight boxing champions

Sporting positions
Amateur boxing titles
Previous: Aaron Garcia	U.S. Golden Gloves featherweight champion 2002	Next: Carney Bowman
World boxing titles
Preceded by Miguel Vázquez	IBF lightweight champion September 13, 2014 – June 25, 2015	Vacant Title next held by Rances Barthelemy
