= Rashidi Ellis =

American boxer (born 1993)

Personal information
- Nickname: Speedy
- Born: May 5, 1993 (age 33) Lynn, Massachusetts, U.S.
- Height: 5 ft 9 in (175 cm)
- Weight: Welterweight

Boxing career
- Reach: 72 in (183 cm)
- Stance: Orthodox

Boxing record
- Total fights: 29
- Wins: 28
- Win by KO: 19
- Losses: 1
- No contests: 0

Rashidi Ellis is an American professional boxer. He is currently ranked #25 in the world in the Welterweight category according to BoxRec.

== Professional career ==
Ellis made his professional debut on July 27, 2013, against Josh Beeman. Ellis won the fight via Unanimous Decision.

Ellis faced Marco Antonio Lopez on the undercard of Canelo Álvarez vs. Amir Khan. Ellis won the fight via a Unanimous decision.

After accumulating a record of 16–0, Ellis earned his first championship bout, where he faced Eddie Gomez on December 16, 2016, for the IBF North American Welterweight championship. Ellis won the fight via a first-round knockout, and thus won his first career championship.

His first title defense came on April 20, 2017, against John Karl Sosa. Ellis won the fight via a majority decision , retaining his championship in the process.

His next title defense came on October 13, 2018, against Saul Corral. Ellis won the fight via a seventh-round TKO, once again retaining his championship.

Ellis fought for his second career championship on October 30, 2020, where he faced Alexis Rocha for the vacant WBC International Welterweight championship. Ellis won the fight via a Unanimous Decision, winning his second career championship in the process.

Ellis faced Roiman Villa on January 7, 2023. This would mark Ellis's first career loss, as Villa won the fight via a majority decision.

Ellis fought for his third career championship on February 15, 2025, where he faced Jose Angulo for the WBC USA Silver Welterweight title. Ellis won the fight via a seventh-round corner retirement, winning his third career championship.

== Personal life ==
His younger sister, Rashida Ellis is also a professional boxer.

== Professional boxing record ==
31 fights	30 wins	1 loss
By knockout	19	0
By decision	11	1

No.	Result	Record	Opponent	Type	Round, time	Date	Location	Notes
29	Win	28–1	Javier Fortuna	TKO	4 (10), 1:53	Nov 1, 2025	Mohegan Sun Arena, Uncasville, Connecticut, U.S.	
28	Win	27–1	Josec Ruiz	TKO	3 (10), 2:19	Jun 21, 2025	Lowell Memorial Auditorium, Lowell, Massachusetts, U.S.	
27	Win	26–1	Jose Angulo	RTD	7 (10), 3:00	Feb 15, 2025	Mohegan Sun Arena, Uncasville, Connecticut, U.S.	Won WBC USA Silver welterweight title
26	Win	25–1	Brian Damian Chaves	RTD	2 (8), 3:00	Oct 25, 2024	Oceanside Events Center, Revere, Massachusetts, U.S.	
25	Loss	24–1	Roiman Villa	MD	12	Jan 7, 2023	Capital One Arena, Washington D.C., U.S.	
24	Win	24–0	Jose Marruffo	TKO	1 (8), 2:18	Jul 9, 2022	Alamodome, San Antonio, Texas, U.S.	
23	Win	23–0	Alexis Rocha	UD	12	Oct 30, 2020	Fantasy Springs Resort Casino, Indio, California, U.S.	Won vacant WBC International welterweight title
22	Win	22–0	Eddie Gomez	UD	10	Nov 23, 2019	Fantasy Springs Resort Casino, Indio, California, U.S.	
21	Win	21–0	Saul Corral	TKO	7 (10), 0:38	Oct 13, 2018	The Joint, Paradise, Nevada, U.S.	Retained IBF North American welterweight title
20	Win	20–0	Alberto Mosquera	UD	10	Jun 29, 2018	Grand Oasis Arena, Cancún, Mexico	
19	Win	19–0	Fidel Monterrosa	TKO	4 (8), 1:33	Mar 24, 2018	Complejo Ferial, Ponce, Puerto Rico	
18	Win	18–0	John Karl Sosa	MD	10	Apr 20, 2017	Turning Stone Resort & Casino, Verona, New York, U.S.	Retained IBF North American welterweight title
17	Win	17–0	Eddie Gomez	KO	1 (10), 1:19	Dec 16, 2016	Fantasy Springs Resort Casino, Indio, California, U.S.	Won IBF North American welterweight title
16	Win	16–0	Luis Hernandez	UD	8	Jul 15, 2016	Fantasy Springs Resort Casino, Indio, California, U.S.	
15	Win	15–0	Marco Antonio Lopez	UD	8	May 7, 2016	T-Mobile Arena, Paradise, Nevada, U.S.	
14	Win	14–0	Victor Gonzalez	TKO	4 (8), 1:04	Mar 14, 2015	Coliseo Roger L. Mendoza, Caguas, Puerto Rico	
13	Win	13–0	Joseph De los Santos	TKO	5 (6), 2:35	Nov 14, 2014	Roberto Clemente Coliseum, San Juan, Puerto Rico	
12	Win	12–0	Jose Martinez	TKO	1 (4), 2:23	Sep 17, 2014	Polideportivo De Sabana Perdida, Santo Domingo, Dominican Republic	
11	Win	11–0	Joananthony Vazquez	TKO	2 (6), 0:36	Aug 16, 2014	Coliseo Héctor Solá Bezares, Caguas, Puerto Rico	
10	Win	10–0	David Martinez	UD	4	Jul 19, 2014	Coliseo Pedro Julio Nolasco, La Romana, Dominican Republic	
9	Win	9–0	Regino Canales	TKO	3 (6), 2:55	Jul 11, 2014	Emilio Huyke Coliseum, Humacao, Puerto Rico	
8	Win	8–0	Juan Carlos Santos Guillen	KO	1 (6), 1:32	Jun 20, 2014	Gimnasio Pina Acevedo, Santo Domingo, Dominican Republic	
7	Win	7–0	Juan Santos Rodriguez	TKO	1 (6), 2:19	Jun 1, 2014	Coliseo Pedro Julio Nolasco, La Romana, Dominican Republic	
6	Win	6–0	Esteban Diaz	TKO	2 (6), 2:13	May 3, 2014	Gimnasio Pedro Cruz, Santiago de los Caballeros, Dominican Republic	
5	Win	5–0	Orlando Falcon	DQ	2 (6), 0:51	Mar 29, 2014	Coliseo Cosme Beitia Salamo, Catano, Puerto Rico	
4	Win	4–0	Bryan Abraham	TKO	2 (4), 1:08	Mar 17, 2014	House of Blues, Boston, Massachusetts, U.S.	
3	Win	3–0	Oscar Diaz	TKO	1 (4), 2:16	Nov 23, 2013	Royale Nightclub, Boston, Massachusetts, U.S.	
2	Win	2–0	Aguilando Brandao	TKO	1 (4), 1:53	Sep 7, 2013	Royale Nightclub, Boston, Massachusetts, U.S.	
1	Win	1–0	Josh Beeman	UD	4	Jul 27, 2013	Royale Nightclub, Boston, Massachusetts, U.S.	
