= Luis Fuente =

Mexican boxer (born 1981)

Personal information
- Nickname: Pumita
- Born: Luis Alberto Fuente; March 11, 1981 (age 45) Mérida, Yucatán, Mexico
- Height: 1.70 m (5 ft 7 in)
- Weight: Welterweight; Lightweight; Super featherweight Featherweight

Boxing career
- Reach: 178 cm (70 in)
- Stance: Orthodox

Boxing record
- Total fights: 31
- Wins: 26
- Win by KO: 15
- Losses: 4
- Draws: 1
- No contests: 0

Luis Alberto Fuente (born 11 March 1981) is a Mexican professional boxer and is the former Mexican National Featherweight Champion.

== Professional career ==
=== Mexico National Championship ===
In October 2001, Fuente beat the veteran Oscar Galindo by T.K.O. to win the Mexican National Featherweight title.

On September 12, 2003, Fuente lost to Humberto Soto at the Orleans Hotel and Casino in Las Vegas, Nevada.
