= Ricardo Domínguez =

Mexican boxer

Ricardo Dominguez
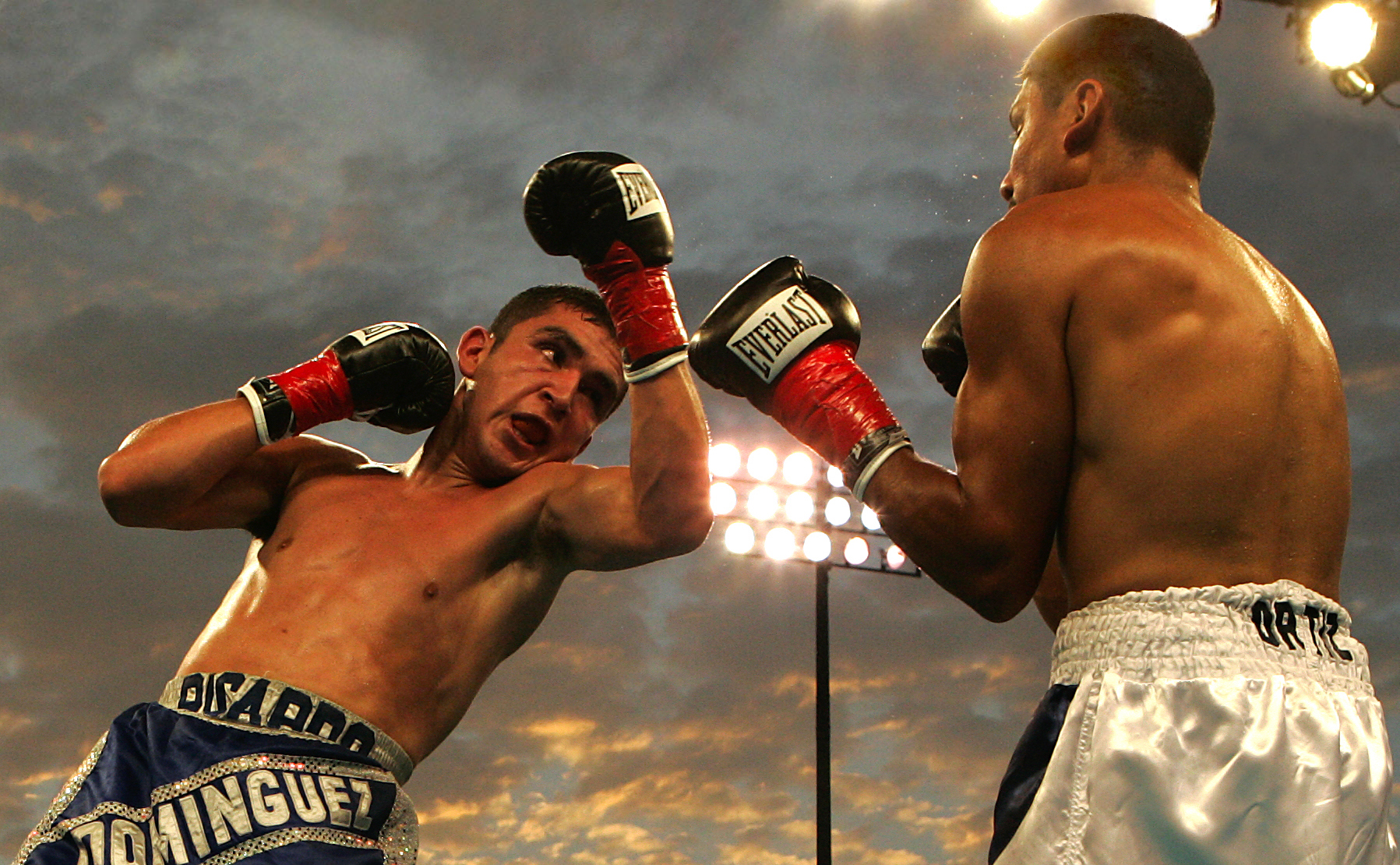

Personal information
- Nickname: Pelón
- Born: Ricardo Domínguez; 20 July 1985 Culiacán, Sinaloa, Mexico
- Died: February 22, 2017 (aged 31)
- Height: 1.78 m (5 ft 10 in)
- Weight: Welterweight; Light Welterweight; Lightweight

Boxing career
- Reach: 182 cm (72 in)

Boxing record
- Total fights: 50
- Wins: 37
- Win by KO: 22
- Losses: 11
- Draws: 2
- No contests: 0

Ricardo Domínguez (July 20, 1985 – February 22, 2017) was a Mexican professional boxer in the Light Welterweight division. He is best known for having won the 2009 Campeón Azteca tournament at Lightweight.

== Professional career ==
Domínguez won his pro debut against Eduardo Castillo in Culiacán, Sinaloa, Mexico.

=== Campeón Azteca ===
In 2009, he fought at the first Campeón Azteca tournament in the Lightweight division, where he beat Saul Carreon and Jesus Gonzalez in the first two rounds. At the tournament's championship fight he knocked out Reyes Sanchez to not only win the prize money, but also a title fight with the WBC Lightweight Champion.

=== WBC Lightweight Championship ===
In May 2010, Dominguez lost his first ever title fight to WBC champion Humberto Soto.

=== IBF Lightweight Championship ===
On November 27, 2010, Domínguez lost to Miguel Vazquez the IBF Lightweight champion in Tijuana, Baja California, Mexico. This was Dominguez' second title fight.

=== Professional record ===
37 wins (22 knockouts), 11 losses, 2 draws
Res.	Record	Opponent	Type	Rd., time	Date	Location	Notes
—N/a	—N/a	(Mexico) Antonio Lozada Jr.	—N/a	—N/a	April 16, 2011	Tijuana, Baja California, Mexico	
Loss	32-7-2	(Mexico) Miguel Vazquez	UD	12 (12)	November 27, 2010	Tijuana, Baja California, Mexico	For the IBF Lightweight title
