= Ismael González =

Mexican boxer (born 1978)

Ismael González Moreno (Note: In this Spanish name, the first or paternal surname is González and the second or maternal family name is Moreno.) (born 16 June 1978) is a Mexican former professional boxer who competed from 1997 to 2013. He held the WBC FECARBOX featherweight title from 2003 to 2004.

== Professional career ==
=== WBC FECARBOX Championship ===
In October 2003, González upset the veteran Armando Hernández to win the WBC FECARBOX featherweight title.

On 10 December 2004 González lost to Humberto Soto at El Foro in Tijuana, Mexico.
