= Robert Manzanarez =

American boxer (born 1994)

Robert Manzanárez
Personal information
- Nickname: Tito
- Born: Robert Manzanárez Sandoval; December 17, 1994 (age 31) Phoenix, Arizona, U.S.
- Height: 5 ft 8 in (174 cm)
- Weight: Super Bantamweight; Bantamweight; Lightweight

Boxing career
- Reach: 70 in (179 cm)
- Stance: Orthodox

Boxing record
- Total fights: 41
- Wins: 38
- Win by KO: 31
- Losses: 3
- Draws: 0
- No contests: 0

Robert Manzanárez Sandoval (born December 17, 1994, in Phoenix, Arizona) is an American professional boxer in the Lightweight division and fights out of Los Mochis, Sinaloa, Mexico.

== Professional career ==
On August 27, 2011, Manzanárez knocked out the veteran Édgar Martínez at the Centro de Espectaculos de la Feria de León in León, Guanajuato, Mexico.
