= Ivan Valle =

Mexican boxer (born 1980)

Personal information
- Nickname: Relampago
- Born: Ivan deJesus Valle Velazquez; 6 January 1980 (age 46) Los Mochis, Sinaloa, Mexico
- Height: 1.79 m (5 ft 10 in)
- Weight: Lightweight; Super featherweight Featherweight

Boxing career
- Reach: 182 cm (72 in)
- Stance: Orthodox

Boxing record
- Total fights: 42
- Wins: 28
- Win by KO: 24
- Losses: 11
- Draws: 3
- No contests: 0

Ivan deJesus Valle Velazquez (born 6 January 1980) is a Mexican former professional boxer who competed from 1997 to 2010. He's the former WBC Mundo Hispano featherweight champion.

== Professional career ==
In June 2001, Ivan beat the veteran Jose Luis Mendoza by T.K.O. to win the Mexican National super featherweight title.

On February 28, 2003, Valle lost to Humberto Soto at the Thomas & Mack Center in Las Vegas.
