= Vasiliy Lomachenko vs. Richard Commey =

Boxing match

Some Forces Can't Be Contained
- Date: December 11, 2021
- Venue: Madison Square Garden, New York City, New York, U.S.
- Title(s) on the line: vacant WBO Inter-Continental lightweight title

Tale of the tape
Boxer	Vasiliy Lomachenko	Richard Commey
Nickname	"Loma"	
Hometown	Bilhorod-Dnistrovskyi, Odesa Oblast, Ukraine	Accra, Greater Accra, Ghana
Pre-fight record	15–2 (11 KO)	30–3 (27 KO)
Age	33 years, 9 months	34 years, 9 months
Height	5 ft 7 in (170 cm)	5 ft 8 in (173 cm)
Weight	134 2/5 lb (61 kg)	134 1/5 lb (61 kg)
Style	Southpaw	Orthodox
Recognition	WBC/WBO/The Ring/TBRB; No. 1 Ranked Lightweight; WBA; No. 3 Ranked Lightweight; IBF; No. 6 Ranked Lightweight; The Ring No. 8 ranked pound-for-pound fighter 3-division world champion	WBC/WBO; No. 5 Ranked Lightweight; IBF; No. 7 Ranked Lightweight; The Ring/TBRB; No. 4 Ranked Lightweight; Former lightweight champion

Result
- Lomachenko wins via 12-round unanimous decision (117-110, 119-108, 119-108)

Vasiliy Lomachenko vs. Richard Commey, billed as Some Forces Can't Be Contained was a lightweight professional boxing match contested between former 3-division champion, Vasiliy Lomachenko, and former IBF lightweight champion, Richard Commey on December 11, 2021, at Madison Square Garden, in New York City, New York, U.S.

== Background ==
In August 2021, it was reported that Lomachenko was in talks to fight former world champion Richard Commey (30-3, 27 KOs) later in the year. On 13 October, in an attempt to put his name back into contention for a shot at his old titles, Lomachenko agreed to fight Commey on 11 December at Madison Square Garden in New York City. Commey returned to the ring after a 14-month lay off in February 2021 to defeat Jackson Mariñez via knockout. It was his first outing since losing the IBF title to Teofimo López. The fight was announced on 31 October and regarded as a top level non-title lightweight bout. A fight between Lomachenko and Commey was originally planned in 2019, with all aspects being agreed, only for Commey to pull out due to a hand injury.

Both Lomachenko and Commey share a common loss with former unified lightweight champion, Teófimo López. Commey was knocked out by López in round two in their bout in 2019, losing the IBF lightweight title. Lomachenko lost his unified lightweight titles in an upset in 2020, losing by unanimous decision.

Lomachenko bounced back from his defeat to López, knocking out lightweight contender Masayoshi Nakatani in June 2021, and called López out for a rematch, claiming he "still wanted to become the undisputed champion" at lightweight.

Commey also bounced back from his defeat to López, knocking out Jackson Maríñez in round six in February 2021.

The bout was aired live on ESPN in the US, and on Sky Sports in the UK and Ireland. There was mutual respect shown at the weigh in as Lomachenko weighed 134.4 pounds and Commey weighed 134.2 pounds.

== The fight ==
There was 8,555 fans in attendance. On fight night, where Lomachenko was listed as a 10-1 favorite, he dropped Commey in the seventh round courtesy of a short left hook, later pleading with the corner of the still unsteady Commey to stop the fight. They refused, and Commey survived and went the full 12 rounds. The judges scored it 119–108, 119–108, and 117–110, all for Lomachenko, who dominated the fight.

During the post-fight, Lomachenko was asked why he pleaded with Commey's corner to stop the fight. He replied, "I saw his situation, it was very hard for him. That's why I said, 'Hey, stop the fight.' He is a true warrior. He has a big heart and we continue and we show for people 12 great rounds." Commey's trainer Andre Rozier explained why he did not stop the fight. He said, "Richard is a warrior and Vasiliy is a great champion. When he signalled to stop it, for me to take his [Commey] pride and his energy and his diligence away, it would have been a horrible thing to do. I told Richard to get up and let's get it together. Try not to make any mistakes and keep working. As you see, he did go the entire 12 rounds of this fight and he fought his heart out." When asked about fighting newly crowned unified lightweight champion, George Kambosos Jr., who had upset Teofimo López a few weeks previously, Lomachenko jumped at the idea, stating that he 'needs this chance' and would be willing to fly to Australia if necessary. The fight averaged 1,129,000 viewers and peaked 1,243,000 viewers on ESPN.

== Aftermath ==
After the bout when asked about fighting newly crowned unified lightweight champion, George Kambosos Jr., who had upset Teofimo Lopez a few weeks previously, Lomachenko jumped at the idea, stating that he 'needs this chance' and would be willing to fly to Australia if necessary. However, on 24 February 2022 Russia launched an invasion of Ukraine and Lomachenko returned to his home country to aid in the war effort. On 20 March, Lomachenko was given permission to leave Ukraine in order to face George Kambosos Jr. in Australia. However, he declined, opting to stay and fight for his country. Kambosos Jr. instead lost his titles to WBC champion Devin Haney, who thereby became the undisputed lightweight champion.

== Undercard ==
Confirmed bouts:

== Broadcasting ==
Country	Broadcaster
United Kingdom	Sky Sports
United States	ESPN

Preceded by vs. Masayoshi Nakatani	Vasiliy Lomachenko's bouts 11 December 2021	Succeeded by vs. Jamaine Ortiz
Preceded by vs. Jackson Marinez	Richard Commey's bouts 11 December 2021	Succeeded by vs. José Pedraza
