= Vasiliy Lomachenko vs. Masayoshi Nakatani =

Boxing match

- Date: June 26, 2021
- Venue: Virgin Hotels Las Vegas, Paradise, Nevada, U.S.

Tale of the tape
| Boxer | (Ukraine) Vasiliy Lomachenko | (Japan) Masayoshi Nakatani |
| Nickname | "Loma" | |
| Hometown | Bilhorod-Dnistrovskyi, Odesa Oblast, Ukraine | Osaka, Kansai, Japan |
| Pre-fight record | 14–2 (10 KO) | 19–1 (13 KO) |
| Age | 33 years, 4 months | 32 years, 3 months |
| Height | 5 ft 7 in (170 cm) | 5 ft 11 1/2 in (182 cm) |
| Weight | 134 3/5 lb (61 kg) | 134 2/5 lb (61 kg) |
| Style | Southpaw | Orthodox |
| Recognition | WBC/The Ring/TBRB; No. 1 Ranked Lightweight; WBA/WBO; No. 2 Ranked Lightweight; IBF; No. 5 Ranked Lightweight; The Ring No. 9 ranked pound-for-pound fighter 3-division world champion | WBO; No. 5 Ranked Lightweight; WBC/WBA/The Ring/TBRB; No. 9 Ranked Lightweight; IBF; No. 10 Ranked Lightweight |

Result
- Lomachenko wins via 9th-round TKO

Vasiliy Lomachenko vs. Masayoshi Nakatani was a lightweight professional boxing match contested between three-division former unified lightweight world champion Vasiliy Lomachenko, and lightweight contender Masayoshi Nakatani. The bout took place on June 26, 2021, at the Virgin Hotels Las Vegas in Paradise, Nevada. Lomachenko won the fight by ninth-round technical knockout.

== Background ==
On 11 February 2021, Arum and Lomachenko began looking towards the next fight. Lomachenko wanted to fight in front of a crowd and was tired of fighting in The Bubble. His next fight was looking likely to he scheduled for the summer, with Japanese boxer Masayoshi Nakatani (19-1, 13 KOs) a frontrunner to land the fight. It was noted as an interesting clash of styles as Nakatani had a 6-inch height and reach advantage over Lomachenko. On 24 April, the fight between Lomachenko and Nakatani was announced by ESPN to take place on 26 June 2021 at The Theater at Virgin Hotels in Las Vegas. Lomachenko weighed 134.6 pounds, while Nakatani weighed 134.4 pounds. The pair share a common loss to Teófimo López. Lomachenko lost his unified titles to the American in October 2020, while Nakatani had also lost a unanimous decision to López in July 2019.

Lomachenko cited that he "still wanted to be undisputed lightweight champion". However, López declined to give Lomachenko a rematch, explaining that “everybody [in Lomachenko’s camp] was being a dick to me, my father. He [Lomachenko] didn’t want to put a rematch clause in our contract." Speaking on why he chose Nakatani as his next opponent, Lomachenko said "I want to compare myself with this guy, he was close with [López] in their fight."

Nakatani most recently fought in December 2020, where he stopped Félix Verdejo in the ninth round after being dropped for the first time in his professional career and behind on the scorecards. This was a bounce back win after losing to Teófimo López in 2019.

The bout was aired on ESPN+ in the US and Sky Sports in the UK and Ireland. It went head to head with Gervonta Davis' light welterweight clash with Mario Barrios on Showtime PPV in Atlanta, Georgia taking place on the same night. The fight was only the second time in Lomachenko's professional career that a world title was not on the line and first since his debut.

== Fight details ==
On the night, Lomachenko scored a knockdown in the fifth round en route to a ninth-round technical knockout victory. Nakatani proved to be over-matched and there was a clear difference in levels in how Lomachenko dominated the fight. Despite the pre-fight talk from boxing media, Nakatani was not able to use his advantage of height and reach against Lomachenko, who easily evaded Nakatani's power shots. In the fifth round, Nakatani began to hold as soon as Lomachenko go close. Nakatani was dropped from an over hand left followed by a right hand. The fight worsened for him as he took another beating in the sixth round. Nakatani saw some success in his body shots during the fight. After a barrage of left hands in round nine, referee Celestino Ruiz stepped in to call a halt to the fight. At the time of stoppage, Lomachenko was ahead 80-71, 80-71 and 78-73 on the judges scorecards.

According to CompuBox, Lomachenko landed 104 out of 204 punches thrown (48.6%), with 89 of those shots being power punches out of 152. Nakatani landed 29 of his 250 thrown (11.6%). The ninth round was significant alone which saw Lomachenko connect 19 power shots with a 65% connect rate.

== Aftermath ==
With the victory, Lomachenko earned the right to a potential rematch with López, a reward he has made no secret that he desperately seeks. "He has a fight in the future with [George] Kambosos, but after [we will fight]," Lomachenko said. "Maybe next year, beginning of the year. December, January, February. I am waiting." Lomachenko added: "Everybody saw how I won this fight, and everybody is waiting for the rematch, so let's make a rematch."

== Fight card ==
Confirmed bouts:

| Weight Class | | vs. | | Method | Round | Time | Notes |
|---|---|---|---|---|---|---|---|
| Lightweight | (Ukraine) Vasiliy Lomachenko | def. | (Japan) Masayoshi Nakatani | TKO | 9/12 | 1:48 |
| Middleweight | (Kazakhstan) Janibek Alimkhanuly | def. | (United States) Rob Brant | RTD | 8/10 | 3:00 |
| Heavyweight | (Italy) Guido Vianello | def. | (United States) Marlon Williams | TKO | 2/4 | 0:01 |
| Welterweight | (United States) Giovani Santillan | def. | (United States) Cecil McCalla | UD | 8/8 |
| Bantamweight | (Mexico) Luis Fernando Saavedra | def. | (United States) Robert Rodriguez | UD | 6/6 |
| Bantamweight | (United States) Floyd Diaz | def. | (United States) Jaime Jasso | UD | 4/4 |
| Super bantamweight | (Japan) Subaru Murata | def. | (United States) Keven Monroy | TKO | 2/4 | 1:42 | ^{Note 1} |
| Lightweight | (United States) DeMichael Harris | def. | (Argentina) Jonatan Hernan Godoy | RTD | 3/4 | 3:00 |

^Note 1 Murata's professional debut

== Broadcasting ==
| Country/Region | Broadcaster | | | |
| Country/Region | Free | Cable TV | PPV | Stream |
|---|---|---|---|---|
| United States (host) | —N/a | | | ESPN+ |
| Ukraine | —N/a | MEGOGO | —N/a | MEGOGO |
| Japan | —N/a | Wowow | —N/a | Wowow |
| Unsold markets | —N/a | | FITE TV | |
| France | —N/a | BeIN Sports | —N/a | BeIN Sports |
| Russia | Match TV | | —N/a | Match TV |
| United Kingdom | —N/a | Sky Sports | —N/a | Sky Sports |
| Ireland | —N/a | Sky Sports | —N/a | Sky Sports |

| Preceded by vs. Teófimo López | Vasiliy Lomachenko's bouts 26 June 2021 | Succeeded by vs. Richard Commey |
| Preceded by vs. Félix Verdejo | Masayoshi Nakatani's bouts 26 June 2021 | Succeeded by vs. Harmonito Dela Torre |
