= Juan Santiago (boxer) =

American boxer

Personal information
- Nickname: Chago
- Nationality: American
- Born: Juan Santiago; February 14, 1985 (age 41) Denver, Colorado
- Height: 5 ft 11 in (182 cm)
- Weight: Welterweight

Boxing career
- Reach: 73 in (185 cm)
- Stance: Orthodox

Boxing record
- Total fights: 43
- Wins: 16
- Win by KO: 9
- Losses: 24
- Draws: 3
- No contests: 0

Juan Santiago (born February 14, 1985, in Denver, Colorado) is an American professional boxer in the Light welterweight division.

== Pro career ==
Santiago's biggest career victory was over an undefeated Ty Barnett (16-0), he would knockout Barnett in the first round.

On October 1, 2010 Santiago lost by knockout to the undefeated Archie Ray Márquez in just three rounds, the bout was on Showtime.

Santiago has lost to six undefeated fighters Sonny Fredrickson, Felix Verdejo, Eloy Perez, Diego Magdaleno, Archie Ray Márquez, and Vernon Paris. The Perez fight was for the North American Boxing Organization super featherweight title.
