= Vasiliy Lomachenko =

Ukrainian boxer (born 1988)

Vasiliy Lomachenko Василь Ломаченко
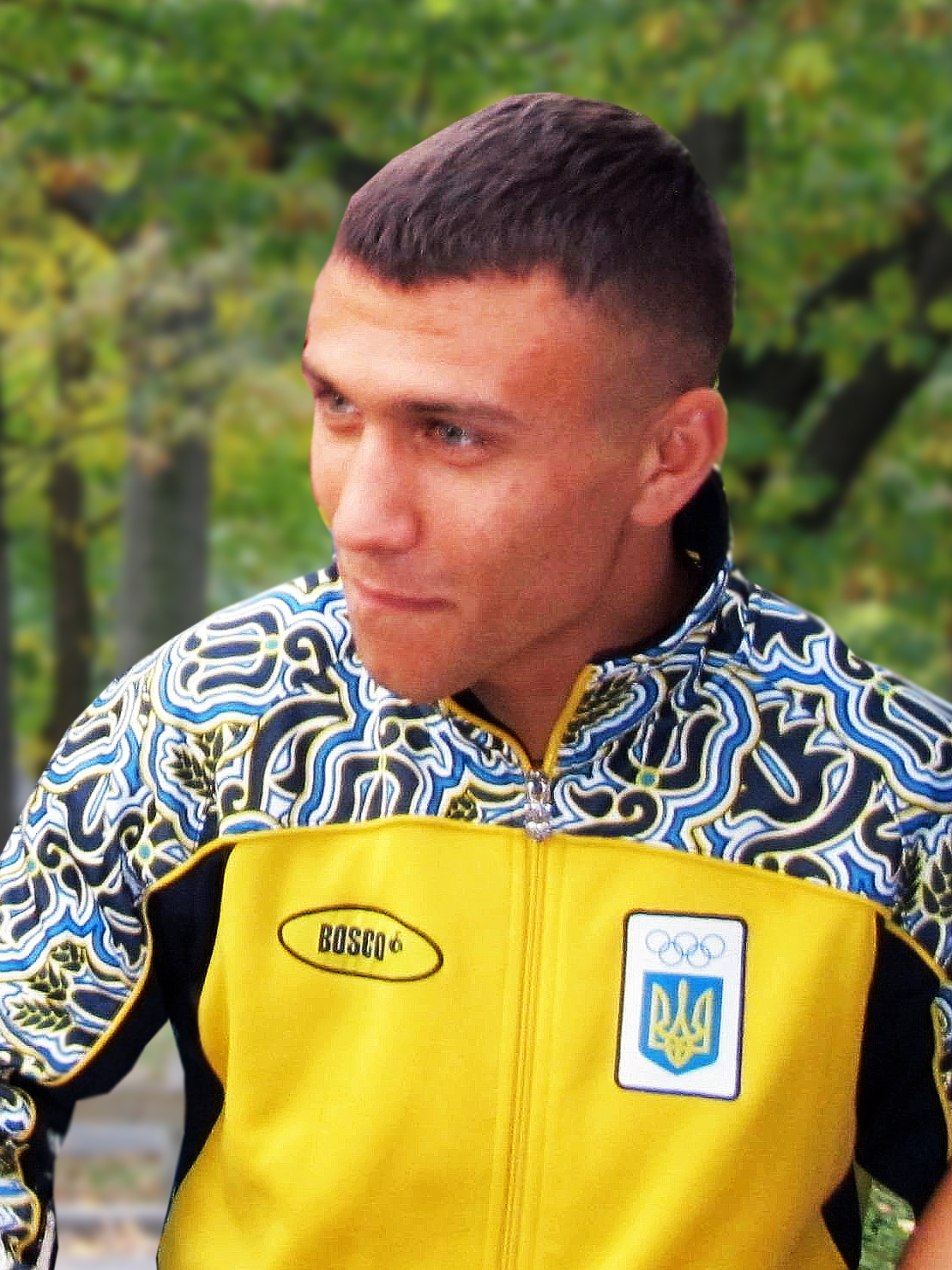
- Lomachenko in 2012

Personal information
- Nicknames: The Matrix; Hi-Tech; Loma
- Born: Vasyl Anatoliyovych Lomachenko; 17 February 1988 (age 38) Bilhorod-Dnistrovskyi, Ukrainian SSR, Soviet Union (now Ukraine)
- Height: 5 ft 7 in (170 cm)

Boxing career
- Weight class: Featherweight; Super featherweight; Lightweight
- Reach: 65 1/2 in (166 cm)
- Stance: Southpaw

Boxing record
- Total fights: 21
- Wins: 18
- Win by KO: 12
- Losses: 3
Medal record
Men's amateur boxing
Representing Ukraine
Olympic Games
Gold medal – first place	2008 Beijing	Featherweight
Gold medal – first place	2012 London	Lightweight
World Championships
Gold medal – first place	2009 Milan	Featherweight
Gold medal – first place	2011 Baku	Lightweight
Silver medal – second place	2007 Chicago	Featherweight
European Championships
Gold medal – first place	2008 Liverpool	Featherweight
Junior World Championships
Gold medal – first place	2006 Agadir	Flyweight
Cadet European Championships
Gold medal – first place	2004 Saratov	Atomweight

Vasiliy Anatolyevich Lomachenko (Note: The transliteration is based on the Russian language, rather than Ukrainian.) (also spelled Vasyl Anatoliyovych Lomachenko; Ukrainian: Василь Анатолійович Ломаченко, IPA: [wɐˈsɪlʲ lomɐˈtʃɛnko]; born 17 February 1988) is a Ukrainian professional boxer who originally competed between 2013 and 2024 when he retired. He announced a comeback in 2027. He has held multiple world championships in three weight classes, including the World Boxing Organization (WBO) featherweight title from 2014 to 2016, the WBO super featherweight title from 2016 to 2018, the unified World Boxing Association (WBA) (Super version), World Boxing Council (WBC), WBO, and Ring magazine lightweight titles from 2018 to 2020, and the International Boxing Federation (IBF) lightweight title from 2024 to 2025.

Lomachenko is one of the most successful amateur boxers of all time and often considered to be the greatest, possessing a record of 396 wins and 1 loss, with that loss avenged twice. Competing in the featherweight and lightweight divisions, he won a silver medal at the 2007 World Championships, gold at the 2008 European Championships, consecutive gold at the 2008 and 2012 Olympics, and consecutive gold at the 2009 and 2011 World Championships.

Making his professional debut in 2013, Lomachenko tied the record with Thailand's Saensak Muangsurin for winning a world title in the fewest professional fights, becoming the World Boxing Organization (WBO) featherweight champion in his third fight. He is known for his exceptional hand speed, timing, accuracy, creativity, athleticism, defence and footwork.

He has won several awards by media outlets throughout his career. The Ring and ESPN named him Prospect of the Year in 2013; CBS Sports named him Boxer of the Year in 2016; HBO Sports named him Boxer of the Year in 2016 and in 2017; and the Boxing Writers Association of America and The Ring named him Fighter of the Year in 2017.

On June 5, 2025, Lomachenko announced his retirement from professional boxing at the age of 37. In November 2026, he announced that he would be returning in early 2027.

== Early life ==
Lomachenko was coached by his father Anatoly Lomachenko from a young age. He claims that if his father had not been a boxing coach he probably would have chosen to play ice hockey professionally. According to Bob Arum in 2017, Lomachenko's father did not let him train for boxing until he attended traditional Ukrainian dance classes. He then went on to gymnastics before finally getting into the ring.

== Amateur career ==
At the 2007 World Championships in Chicago, he won silver by beating Abner Cotto in the first round, Theodoros Papazov, Mikhail Bernadski, Arturo Santos Reyes, and Li Yang in the semifinal to reach fellow southpaw and Russian favorite Albert Selimov, to whom he lost 11–16. This was the only loss in Lomachenko's amateur career.

Lomachenko won gold at the 2008 Olympic Games in Beijing. He beat his five opponents by an astonishing 45 point margin, outscoring them 58–13, en route to his first gold medal at the senior level. He was subsequently named the outstanding boxer of the tournament and awarded the Val Barker Trophy. Additionally, he won gold again that year to also become continental champion at the European Championships in Liverpool.

He won gold at the 2009 World Championships in Milan. He then competed as a lightweight at the 2011 World Championships in Baku after AIBA removed the featherweight division. There, he won his second consecutive gold medal to become a two-weight world champion.

Following a forced move up to lightweight, he won his second consecutive Olympic gold medal at the 2012 Olympic Games in London to become a rare two-weight Olympic champion. He defeated Han Soon-Chul of South Korea in the final, 19–9, and was a strong candidate to win the Val Barker Trophy for a second time in what would have historically been an unprecedented feat. Ultimately, he was edged out by welterweight gold medal winner, Serik Sapiyev, of Kazakhstan.

He finished his extensive amateur career with an impressive record of 396 wins and only 1 loss, to Albert Selimov, which was avenged twice. In November 2017, boxing website The Sweet Science conducted a readers' poll, which ran for several weeks, to determine the amateur boxer regarded by the public majority as the all-time best. Alongside Lomachenko, the five other standout finalists selected were: László Papp, Teófilo Stevenson, Félix Savón, Mark Breland, and Guillermo Rigondeaux. While none were able to claim the majority vote, Lomachenko won a plurality, having led the poll with nearly one-third of the total votes cast.

=== World Championships results ===
2007

- Defeated Abner Cotto (Puerto Rico) 26–9
- Defeated Theodoros Papazov (Greece) 19–5
- Defeated Mikhail Bernadski (Belarus) 21–6
- Defeated Arturo Santos Reyes (Mexico) RSCO 3 (0:25)
- Defeated Li Yang (China) 14–13
- Lost to Albert Selimov (Russia) 11–16

2009

- Defeated Mario Aleksić (Bosnia and Herzegovina) 16–2
- Defeated Craig Evans (Wales) 15–1
- Defeated Branimir Stanković (Serbia) 8–2
- Defeated Óscar Valdez (Mexico) 12–1
- Defeated Sergey Vodopyanov (Russia) 12–1

2011

- Defeated Lomalito Moala (Tonga) RSC 1 (2:06)
- Defeated José Carlos Ramírez (USA) 16–9
- Defeated Robson Conceição (Brasil) 19–18
- Defeated Fazliddin Gaibnazarov (Uzbekistan) 18–10
- Defeated Domenico Valentino (Italy) 17–11
- Defeated Yasniel Toledo (Cuba) 17–12

=== Junior World Championships results ===
2006

- Defeated Derenik Gizhlaryan (Armenia) 34–14
- Defeated Sergey Vodopyanov (Russia) 37–17
- Defeated Andrew Selby (Wales) RSCO
- Defeated Rahim Najafov (Azerbaijan) RSCO
- Defeated Albert Portuondo (Cuba) RSCO 3

=== Olympic Games results ===
2008

- Defeated Albert Selimov (Russia) 14–7
- Defeated Bahodirjon Sooltonov (Uzbekistan) 13–1
- Defeated Li Yang (China) 12–3
- Defeated Yakup Kılıç (Turkey) 10–1
- Defeated Khedafi Djelkhir (France) 9–1 RSC 1 (2:51)

2012

- 1st round bye
- Defeated Wellington Arias (Dominican Republic) 15–3
- Defeated Félix Verdejo (Puerto Rico) 14–9
- Defeated Yasniel Toledo (Cuba) 14–11
- Defeated Han Soon-Chul (Republic of Korea) 19–9

=== European Championships results ===
2008

- Defeated Vladimir Nikiforov (Estonia) 10–0
- Defeated David Oliver Joyce (Ireland) 10–2
- Defeated Hicham Ziouti (France) 2–1
- Defeated Araik Ambartsumov (Russia) 7–1

=== Cadet European Championships results ===
2004

- Defeated Constantin Paraschiv (Romania) 23–8
- Defeated Edgaras Žemaitis (Lithuania) RSCO
- Defeated Samvel Barseghyan (Armenia) RSCO 2
- Defeated Farid Aleshkin (Russia) 34–12

== World Series of Boxing ==
Prior to turning professional, Lomachenko competed in the lightweight division of the World Series of Boxing (WSB) from January to May 2013. Some outlets would later claim that the six fights Lomachenko had in this tournament should have counted towards his professional record, due to WSB being professional boxing by law, with no headgear and rounds being scored using the ten-point must system according to the regulations set by professional boxing commissions that license the boxers, promoters, and officials.

== Professional career ==
=== Featherweight ===
After winning his second Olympic gold medal, Lomachenko made the decision to turn professional. After meeting with several fight promoters, he signed a contract to fight for Top Rank. Lomachenko made his professional debut in United States on 12 October 2013 as part of the undercard to Timothy Bradley vs. Juan Manuel Márquez, defeating Mexican fighter José Ramirez with a fourth-round knockout.

==== Lomachenko vs. Salido ====
Lomachenko attempted to make history by winning a world championship in his second fight and breaking Saensak Muangsurin's record, who won a junior welterweight world title in his third pro fight in 1975. He challenged veteran boxer Orlando Salido for World Boxing Organization's featherweight title. The title became vacant after Salido failed to make weight, weighed in 128 1/4 pounds, over the 126 pound limit. On fight night, he rehydrated to 147 pounds, which was equivalent to the welterweight limit. All of which were still legal since there were no rehydration clauses disclosed in the contract. The fight took place in front of 7,323 at the Alamodome in San Antonio, Texas, on 1 March 2014. Lomachenko would earn $631,000, for what was his second professional bout.

Lomachenko seemed to shy away from engaging Salido throughout most of the fight, probably due to Salido landing numerous low blows and head-butts that the referee failed to call and/or deduct a point. A total of 52 low blows can easily be counted throughout the bout, something that his opponent exploited. A late surge, which saw him injure Salido in the final round, was unable to change the final result, losing by split decision. Two judges had it for Salido 116–112 and 115–113, while the third had it for Lomachenko 115–113. Lomachenko, for his part, stated he felt the decision was fair and accepted blame for not following through with his corner's game plan, promising to learn from the experience and come back stronger. The referee of the fight, Laurence Cole, was roundly criticized by many boxing media outlets for his seemingly ignoring the very many foul blows by Salido, and his perceived failure to properly conduct the match.

==== Lomachenko vs. Russell Jr. ====
The WBO title remained vacant due to Salido not making weight. On 20 March 2014 the WBO contacted Golden Boy Promotions and Top Rank to make them aware that they had 30 days to negotiate a fight between Lomachenko and Gary Russell Jr. (24–0, 14 KO) for the vacant WBO featherweight title. In an interview, WBO President Paco Valcarcel said that the fight should take place no later than July 2014. Purse bids were scheduled which Golden Boy won with a bid of $1,052,500, while Top Rank bid $1,050,000. Lomachenko was entitled to $631,350 (60%) and Russell Jr. was entitled to $420,900 (40%). Golden Boy CEO Richard Schaefer challenged Lomachenko's residency. According to the WBO, "If the fight is held in the country of origin, residence or nationality of one of the contenders, the resident contestant shall receive 40 percent and his opponent shall receive 60 percent off the total purse offered." Schaefer claimed Lomachenko resided in Marina del Rey, California. It was later ascertained that Lomachenko had rented a home in California to live in while training, while Ukraine remained his permanent residence.

The fight took place on 21 June at the StubHub Center in Carson, California. Lomachenko defeated Russell Jr. via twelve-round majority decision to win the vacant WBO featherweight title. Judge Lisa Giampa scored the fight a 114–114 draw, but judges Max DeLuca and Pat Russell scored the fight 116–112 in favor of Lomachenko. Lomachenko used his power and swift skills to maintain control of the fight until the final bell. Lomachenko began to hurt Russell Jr. more in the later rounds with power shots. Russell Jr. landed only 10% of his punches thrown, with a lot of combinations being missed or blocked. Lomachenko landed 183 of 597 punches thrown (31%) and Russell Jr. landed 83 of his 806 thrown. With this victory, Lomachenko joined Saensak Muangsurin as the only other boxer to have won a world title in the quickest amount of time since turning professional, accomplishing the feat in just his third professional bout. The fight averaged 578,000 viewers.

==== Lomachenko vs. Piriyapinyo ====
Lomachenko made his first title defense against mandatory challenger Chonlatarn Piriyapinyo of Thailand. This fight took place on the undercard of Manny Pacquiao vs. Chris Algieri on HBO PPV bout on November 22, 2014, at the Cotai Arena, Venetian Resort in Macao. Although Piriyapinyo's record of 52 wins and 1 loss made the fight sound challenging for Lomachenko, the only time he stepped up in his 11-year career was in 2012 against Chris John, which he lost via unanimous decision. Lomachenko handled his opponent easily, hurting him a few times and scoring a knockdown at the end of the fourth round. In the seventh round, Lomachenko stopped using his left hand; it was later confirmed that he injured that hand. Lomachenko won a unanimous decision with the scores of 120–107 on all three of the judges' scorecards. Lomachenko landed 368 of 1006 punches thrown (37%) and Piriyapinyo landed 94 of his 501 thrown (19%).

==== Lomachenko vs. Rodríguez ====
It was announced prior to Lomachenko's mandatory fight against Piriyapinyo that the winner would next fight 28 year old Puerto Rican boxer Gamalier Rodríguez. Rodriguez earned the title shot after knocking out Martin Cardona. The fight was announced to take place on 2 May 2015 on the under-card of Mayweather-Pacquiao at the MGM Grand Garden Arena. Prior to the fight, Rodriguez was on a 17-fight winning streak dating back to 2010, where the fight resulted in a first round technical draw. Top Rank announced before the fight that Lomachenko had signed a five-year contract extension. On fight night, Lomachenko retained his WBO title against Rodriguez via a ninth-round KO victory. Lomachenko's speed and precision was too much for Rodriguez, who took a knee twice in the fight, once in the seventh and again in the ninth, which ended the bout. He was also docked a point by referee in fifth round for a low blow. Lomachenko landed 227 of 586 punches thrown (39%) compared to Rodriguez who landed only 55 of 285 (19%). After the fight, Lomachenko spoke through a translator about his performance, "I was just boxing for the fans, having a good time out there." Top Rank were hoping to match Lomachenko with then-WBA featherweight champion Nicholas Walters in a unification fight. Lomachenko had a $750,000 purse for the defence.

==== Lomachenko vs. Koasicha ====
Lomachenko next fought on the Tim Bradley vs. Brandon Ríos undercard on HBO against #7 WBO ranked 24 year old Romulo Koasicha. The fight took place on 7 November 2015 at the Mandalay Bay Resort & Casino in Paradise, Nevada. He overwhelmed, dominated and stopped Koasicha in the tenth round on a body shot. In the post fight interview, Lomachenko told of how he wanted to put on a good show, "I was just having fun in there, "If I really wanted to knock him out, I would have done it earlier. I was having a good time, but I knew the end would be on a body shot. I just didn't know which one." Lomachenko earned a career high $750,000 for the fight and out landed Koasicha by 259 punches. CompuBox stats showed that Lomachenko dominated throughout, landing 334 of his 717 punches thrown (47%). Koasicha only managed to land 75 of 607 (12%) and earned $35,000 for the loss. The loss ended Koasicha's run of 4 straight wins and he suffered his first stoppage defeat.

=== Junior lightweight ===
==== Lomachenko vs. Martinez ====
Following a third successful defense, Lomachenko, still the reigning WBO featherweight champion decided to move up weight to junior lightweight to challenge Román Martínez for his WBO title on 11 June 2016 at the Madison Square Garden Theater. Martinez was coming off a draw against Orlando Salido in September 2015, after he controversially defeated him in their first fight in April 2015 for the WBO title. Lomachenko became the fastest boxer to win a world title in two weight divisions knocking out Martinez in the 5th round of the world title fight. Lomachenko dominated the fight from the start with superior footwork, hand speed and slick punching from different angles. According to CompuBox, Lomachenko out-landed Martinez 87 to 34. After the fight, Lomachenko called out Orlando Salido, "Hey Salido, I'm ready to fight you at any time, before the Vargas fight, I told him to win the fight but I never told him I wasn't going to fight him if he didn't, so let's do it. I want to revenge Salido for my fans and give them a win over him." Lomachenko was paid $850,000 for the bout, at the time a career-high purse.

==== Lomachenko vs. Walters ====
After failing to make the fight happen earlier in the year, Top Rank vice president Carl Moretti confirmed on September 28 that Lomachenko would defend his WBO title against 30 year old unbeaten Jamaican boxer Nicholas Walters at The Cosmopolitan in Las Vegas on 26 November on HBO. In previous negotiations, Walters turned down a career-high $550,000 purse, even after Lomachenko offered him a further $300,000 from his own purse if Walters won. HBO provided the remainder of Walter's purse for the fight to go ahead. The event marked Bob Arum's 2,000th promoted card, as well as celebrating his 50th anniversary as a promoter.

After Lomachenko dominated the first six rounds with his movement, he threw more combination punches in the seventh which left Walters visibly shaken. Lomachenko won the fight after Walters retired on his stool at the end of the seventh round. Upon returning to his corner, Walters got up and walked to referee Tony Weeks, where he reiterated twice he did not want to continue. A lot of boos followed the confirmation of the fight result as Walters seemed to back himself up for not returning for round 8, blaming his inactivity in the ring, "Listen to me, if I get the chance to fight two or three fights leading up to this fight, I'll definitely take him on in different circumstances where we are more active and definitely beat him but it was all him tonight... he fought me with three fights this year. So it was all him tonight... Nothing take away from him, he's a very good fighter, I learned a lot from fighting him and it was seven rounds of beautiful boxing until my corner decided to end it."

CompuBox stats showed Lomachenko landed 114 of 437 punches thrown (26 percent) while Walters landed 49 of 264 (19 percent). Lomachenko earned his first $1 million purse. Following the post fight, Arum told ESPN, he would like to make a rematch with Salido next, followed by a lightweight title fight against Terry Flanagan and then a super fight with Manny Pacquiao. The fight drew 761,000 viewers on HBO.

==== Lomachenko vs. Sosa ====
On 2 February 2017, Bob Arum spoke to ESPN. After failing to make a match up with WBA (Super) champion Jezreel Corrales, he announced Lomachenko's next fight would take place on 8 April at the MGM National Harbor in Washington, D.C., in a super featherweight unification against WBA (Regular) champion Jason Sosa. This would have been Sosa's third defence of his secondary title, but on 16 February, he vacated the title. Lomachenko weighed 129.6 pounds. Sosa weighed in at 130.4 pounds, he then stripped down naked and still over weighed at 130.2 and was given the time to trim the extra weight. He later returned to the Maryland commission's scale and successfully made weight exactly 130 pounds allowing himself to challenge for the WBO title. The fight headlined HBO World Championship Boxing. In front of a sell-out crowd of 2,828, mostly Ukrainian, Lomachenko successfully retained his WBO title for a second time after Sosa failed to return for round 10 when his trainer pulled him out. The bout was similar to Lomachenko's previous fight with Walters, who also pulled out. Lomachenko's flashy style and fast combinations won him the rounds. Sosa appeared more hurt in round 8 when he was hit hard on the body.

Sosa was the most successful opponent Lomachenko had fought since Salido in terms of landing punches. He landed 68 of his 286 thrown (24%). Lomachenko landed 275 of 696 punches (40%). Sosa's trainer, Raul Rivas explained why he pulled him out of the fight, "It was an accumulation of too many punches. I didn't want to get Jason hurt. He was out of the fight." Lomachenko said he wanted to follow this victory by only fighting current world champions at super featherweight for a chance to unify the division or he would move up lightweight. Lomachenko's purse for the fight was $800,000. The fight peaked at 886,000 viewers HBO and averaged 832,000 viewers. These numbers showed an increase in viewership for Lomachenko from his last fight on HBO against Walters.

==== Lomachenko vs. Marriaga ====
On 30 June 2017 Top Rank announced that a deal was in place for Lomachenko to make a third defense of his WBO title against Colombian former featherweight world title challenger Miguel Marriaga, who was coming off a loss and moving up to super featherweight. It was confirmed that the fight would take place live on ESPN on August 5, 2017, at the Microsoft Theater in Los Angeles. Carl Moretti of Top Rank stated that Salido had initially turned down a $720,000 purse to fight Lomachenko in a rematch. Even after negotiations to meet his financial needs, Salido still denied the offer due to other problems, mentioning weight and hand issues.

In front of 4,102 people, Lomachenko dominated the fight from the opening bell and proved too much for Marriaga, dropping him twice in the fight, before Marriaga's corner stopped the fight after round 7. Lomachenko retained his WBO title for the third time. The first knockdown came towards the end of the third round when Lomachenko landed a straight left to Marriaga, who was off balance. Marriaga got up straight away and didn't appear hurt. In the fourth round, an accidental clash of heads opened up a cut above Lomachenko's left eye. In the following round, Lomachenko protested to referee Jack Reiss, claiming he was being hit low and headbutted. In the seventh round, Lomachenko landed body shots and uppercuts, eventually dropping Marriaga for the second time with a left hook at 2 minutes and 59 seconds of round 7. Marriaga beat the count and walked towards his corner. The referee waved an end to the fight moments later. Although it was a corner retirement, the California State Athletic Commission ruled it a KO win. Lomachenko earned a $750,000 purse for the fight, compared to the $50,000 received by Marriaga.

During the post fight interviews, Marriaga praised Lomachenko, "He dominated the fight. I connected with some good punches, but I couldn't get the result I was looking for. I wanted to continue the fight, but my corner stopped the fight. He basically overwhelmed me with pressure." Bob Arum also showed his admiration of Lomachenko, comparing him to former heavyweight world champion and legend Muhammad Ali, who had 27 of his professional fight promoted by Arum. He said "I never saw anything like this. He's unbelievable. Not only does he have the knowledge, he has the skill set that I've never seen before. Fast, reflexes, everything and he really entertains. Who else did that? Muhammad Ali." The fight averaged 728,000 viewers on ESPN. The move from HBO to ESPN was done to expose Lomachenko and gain more viewership, but was down by 104,000 compared to Lomachenko's last fight against Sosa on HBO. Viewership was adversely affected by a channel switch when the broadcast began and the time at which their main event started.

==== Lomachenko vs. Rigondeaux ====
On 6 August, Arum stated that Lomachenko would fight for a third time in 2017, likely on 9 or 23 December. When asked who the potential options were, Arum stated, "Well, there's a few guys. (Guillermo) Rigondeaux if he answers Dino (Duva's) call. There's (Orlando) Salido, who's sniffing around and the third is (Miguel) Berchelt." Arum also mentioned lightweight contender Ray Beltrán, but said he would like to capture a world title at lightweight before a potential fight with Lomachenko. Salido informed his manager Sean Gibbons, that he had no issues with fighting Lomachenko in December. Gibbons believed Lomachenko needed Salido more than Salido would need Lomanchenko, as Lomachenko was looking to raise TV ratings and sell out a 10,000 capacity arena. On 14 August, Arum spoke to LA Times and confirmed either Rigondeaux or Salido would be Lomachenko's next opponent. He stated if the bout with Rigondeaux was made, it would likely take place at the Madison Square Garden Theatre and a potential rematch with Salido would take place in Los Angeles.

On 21 August Arum stated the Lomachenko and Rigondeaux camps were closing in on finalizing a deal for December 9. A fight with the two-weight world champion and reigning super bantamweight title holder, a two-time Olympic Gold Medalist and one of the most successful amateur boxers ever, would take place at 130 pounds. The fight was officially confirmed on 15 September. It was since confirmed that the fight would in fact be at the Theater, headlining an ESPN televised card. On 18 November, Carl Moretti of Top Rank revealed a re-hydration clause on the contract. Both fighters agreed to weigh in at 09:00 on the morning of the fight, where they would not be able to exceed 138 pounds. Any fighter over the limit would face a penalty of more than $10,000. On fight night, Lomachenko weighed 137.4 pounds and Rigondeaux weighed 130 pounds.

In front of a sell-out crowd of 5,102 at the Theater, Lomachenko retained his WBO title, dominating the fight with superior boxing skills, forcing Rigondeaux to retire on his stool after round 6. Rigondeaux stated he had broken the top of his left hand in round two, which was the reason he did not come out for round 7. Rigondeax became Lomachenko's fourth consecutive opponent to retire on his stool. The loss also marked the first time Rigondeaux had lost since 2003, when he was still an amateur. At the time of stoppage, Lomachenko was ahead on all three judges' scorecards, 60–53, 59–54, and 59–54.

In the post-fight interviews, Lomachenko was asked about Rigondeaux being his fourth consecutive opponent to retire on his stool, to which Lomachenko joked, "Maybe I should change my second name, now my name is 'No Mas Chenko'." He also went on to say, "This is not his weight, so it's not a big win for me. But he's a good fighter. He's got great skills. I adjusted to his style, low blows and all." Speaking to an interpreter, Rigondeaux said, "I lost, no excuses. I injured the top of my left hand in the second round. He's a very technical fighter. He's explosive. I'm gonna come back because that's what I do. The weight was not a factor in this fight. It was the injury to my hand." According to CompuBox statistics, Lomachenko landed 55 of 339 punches thrown (16%) and Rigondeax landed 15 of his 178 thrown (8%), landing no more than 3 punches per round. For the fight, Lomachenko was guaranteed a purse of $1.2 million whereas Rigondeaux earned a $400,000 purse. On December 12, Dino Duva of Roc Nation Sport, confirmed that Rigondeaux had bruised his hand and not fractured it, as initially stated. The card averaged 1.73 million viewers on ESPN, which did not include ESPN Deportes or the online streaming service.

=== Lightweight ===
The Los Angeles Times' Lance Pugmire was told by Bob Arum on 26 January 2018 that Lomachenko would have his next fight at lightweight. Arum stated he was unable to make unification fights at super featherweight against WBC champion Miguel Berchelt and WBA titleholder Alberto Machado which was the main reason for the move up.

==== Lomachenko vs. Linares ====
On 30 January, Arum told ESPN that negotiations had begun in December 2017 for a fight between Lomachenko and WBA, The Ring Magazine lightweight champion Jorge Linares after speaking to Teiken Promotions, Linares' lead promoter, with the fight to take place on either 28 April or 12 May 2018. The fight would main event an ESPN card. Arum was pushing for the fight to take place at Madison Square Garden on 12 May 2018. The reason behind the date was explained by Arum, "May 12th is an extraordinarily important date for ESPN programming. It's right in the middle of the basketball playoffs." Carl Moretti called Eric Gomez of Golden Boy informing them of the date. Gomez stated they were happy with the fight, however the date of 12 May was not a good date for them, as they already had plans for that date. HBO would likely air the pay-per-view replay of Gennady Golovkin vs. Canelo Álvarez rematch, along with a live bout. On 17 February, Gomez stated the fight was not called off and Arum would need to be more flexible with the date as Golden Boy accepted Arum's terms that the fight would take place in New York. On 13 March, Los Angeles Times confirmed that terms had been agreed between both sides. The agreement was reached after ESPN agreed to televise the fight at 8 p.m. ET/5 p.m. PT, so it would broadcast before HBO's telecast on the same day. Madison Square Garden in New York City was confirmed as the venue. On 21 March, the fight was officially announced. WBO president Francisco Valcarcel told Lomachenko, regardless of result, he would have 10 days to decide on whether he would return to super featherweight and defend his WBO or vacate. Both boxers weighed in 134.6 pounds.

In front of 10,429 in attendance, Lomachenko survived a knockdown in round 6 to win via TKO in round 10 after a perfectly placed liver shot to claim the WBA (Super) and The Ring lightweight titles. In doing so he became the fastest fighter ever to win titles in 3 different weight classes (only 12 professional fights) shattering the previous record of 20 held by Jeff Fenech. Lomachenko wore Linares down with his fast shots through the first 9 rounds, before finishing the fight in round 10. Linares slowly beat the count but looked too hurt to continue. Referee Ricky Gonzalez stopped the fight at 2 minutes, 8 seconds of round 10. The loss snapped Linares' 13-fight win streak. At the time of stoppage, two judges had each fighter ahead 86–84 on their respective scorecards and the third judge Julie Lederman had it 85–85 even. After the fight, Lomachenko said, "It was a great fight. That right hand [that knocked me down], it was a great punch. It happens. I prepared for the last few rounds, and my father [and trainer Anatoly Lomachenko] told me, 'You need to go to the body.' Linares is a great champion, and the fight was good for the fans and everybody." Speaking of the knockout punch, Linares said it was 'perfectly landed.' De La Hoya also congratulated Arum on the fight and told Arum it was good experience working together. According to CompuBox Stats, Linares landed 207 of 739 punches thrown (28%), this included 139 power punches landed and a total amount of 77 body shots landed. Lomachenko landed 213 of 627 punches thrown (34%), with 112 jabs. For the fight, Linares was paid a career high $1 million, with Lomachenko receiving a $1.2 million purse. The card averaged 1,024,00 viewers. The fight itself averaged 1,439,000 viewers and peaked at 1,749,000 viewers, making it the most-watched boxing fight on cable television in 2018. On 23 May, Lomachenko officially vacated his WBO super featherweight title.

==== Lomachenko vs. Pedraza ====
After winning the WBA (Super) and The Ring lightweight titles, promoter Arum stated that Lomachenko would defend the belts on 25 August 2018 at The Forum in Inglewood, California. A possible unification with WBO titleholder Raymundo Beltran was a likely possibility. After vacating his WBO title, Arum stated Lomachenko would not fight on 25 August. It was later revealed that earlier in the bout against Linares, Lomachenko suffered a torn labrum in his right shoulder. He underwent surgery on 30 May at the Cedars-Sinai Kerlan-Jobe Institute in Los Angeles. According to Lomachenko, the shoulder popped out and then back in during the second round. A new return date of December 2018 was targeted. On 10 July, Lomachenko revealed he would return on 25 August. However, on 31 July, his manager Egis Klimas told The Boxing Beat on ESPN+, Lomachenko would make his ring return on 1 December. In the interview, he also stated it would likely be a unification fight against the winner of the Raymundo Beltran vs. José Pedraza bout, which was scheduled to be contested on 25 August. Pedraza defeated Beltran via unanimous decision, winning the WBO title and setting up a fight with Lomachenko. In September, The Ring magazine announced the unification fight between Lomachenko and Pedraza would take place on 8 December 2018 at the Hulu Theatre in New York City.

For the first time as a professional, Lomachenko unified in a weight division as he beat Pedraza via unanimous decision to retain his WBA (Super) title and claim Pedraza's WBO lightweight title, before a sellout crowd of 5,312. Three judges scoring the bout 119–107, 117–109, and 117–109 in Lomachenko's favour. By mid-fight Lomachenko looked to have a solid lead on the cards, but the fight seemed closer in the ring. It was during the championship rounds where the fight came alive. Round 10 was arguably Pedraza's best as he landed a hard right hand to Lomachenko's body. He followed up with a few more bodyshots. Round 11, which was the round of the fight, saw Lomachenko come out quick and land a total of 42 power shots, his busiest round of the fight. In the middle of the round, Lomachenko shook Pedraza following a left hand, which eventually followed with a right hand to the body, dropping Pedraza. Although he beat the count, Pedraza was dropped a second time with over 10 seconds to go following a left to the body. Again, Pedraza beat the count and survived the round. Pedraza used the final round to stay out of reach and take Lomachenko the 12 round distance. The fight ended Lomachenko's 8-fight stoppage streak, in which he saw four consecutive opponents retire on their stool in between rounds. According to CompuBox stats, Lomachenko landed 240 of 738 punches thrown (33%), and Pedraza landed a very low 111 of his 931 punches thrown (12%). 506 of Pedraza's shots thrown where jabs in which only 31 landed. Lomachenko landed 158 power punches throughout the fight.

In the post-fight interview, Lomachenko credited Pedraza as being a tough and tricky fighter, which is why he couldn't score the stoppage victory. He added, "It was my dream to unify titles. It was my next goal. I can now focus on my next chapter." Pedraza was happy with his performance and that he went "12 rounds with the best fighter in the world." He thought the fight was close up until round 11. Arum stated Lomachenko only wanted challenges going forward and would likely next fight in May 2019. The fight averaged 2,013,000 viewers, making it the second most-watched boxing match on American cable or network television in 2018. The fight peaked over 2.1 million viewers and the entire ESPN telecast averaged 1,865,000 viewers. Lomachenko was guaranteed a purse of $1 million, rising to $2 million and Pedraza was guaranteed $350,000, potentially earning closer to $1 million.

==== Lomachenko vs. Crolla ====
Top Rank president Todd duBoef announced Lomachenko would return to the ring on 12 April 2019 at the Staples Center in Los Angeles, headlining Friday night Top Rank Boxing on ESPN. With Richard Commey and Isa Chaniev set to fight for the vacant IBF lightweight title, it was highly likely that the winner would fight Lomachenko in what would be Lomachenko's second unification fight. Top Rank intended to finalize the deal with promoter Lou DiBella, which would see Commey vs. Chaniev take place on 2 February 2019 at the Ford Center in Frisco, Texas. By the end of January 2019, purse bids for Lomachenko vs. Anthony Crolla were pushed back two days to 6 February 2019 with the minimum bid being $150,000.

Commey defeated Chaniev to become the new IBF lightweight champion, however picked up a hand injury during the fight. His promoter Lou DiBella advised Top Rank, Commey would be out of training for a minimum of two months. This prompted Top Rank to start searching for a new opponent for Lomachenko. On 20 February, it was announced that Lomachenko would defend his WBA (Super), WBO and The Ring titles against Crolla at the Staples Center in Los Angeles on 12 April 2019. The bout, including the full undercard would be streamed live and exclusive on ESPN+, to mark the one-year anniversary of the streaming service. The bout would mark Crolla's first time fighting in the US, having only fought once previously outside of his native UK. It was reported that Lomachenko would earn $1.2 million, but guaranteed closer to $3.2 million. Crolla, who was a heavy 100–1 underdog, had an official purse of $300,000 for the fight, however guaranteed more due to UK TV rights.

In front of 10,101 in attendance, Lomachenko stopped Crolla in the first minute of round 4. Lomachenko visibly started to out-throw Crolla during round 2. In round 3, Lomachenko became overwhelmingly dominant while forcing Crolla to spend a majority of his time against the ropes. With 11 seconds left in the round, Lomachenko's combination was interrupted by referee Jack Reiss. At first glance, Lomachenko, and even the crowd, thought it looked as if Reiss had stopped the fight, causing Lomachenko to celebrate by jumping on the corner ropes. However, Reiss immediately corrected the misunderstanding and forced out commissioners who had climbed into the ring, and resumed the fight after a 10-second count for Crolla — although with 1 second left, the round effectively ended immediately. Between rounds 3 and 4, Reiss explained he'd not actually waved off the fight, and instead called a technical knockdown — he was seen immediately pointing and saying "down". He explained he was accounting for the ropes' aid to Crolla's ability to stand, since if the ropes had been absent Crolla would've been down and it is against the rules for a fighter to have any outside support in standing throughout the entire duration of the fight, thus justifying this rarely used but sanctioned technical knockdown. Because of this, Crolla continued on into round 4 where after briefly trying to rally back he was knocked down in second 52 by a right hook to the temple. Crolla fell to the canvas face-first, unable to break his fall. After what looked to be a 3 to 4 second count by Reiss, the fight was waved off, giving Lomachenko the win and retaining his sanctioned belts. Crolla was unable to participate in the post-fight interviews, but did not decide to immediately go to hospital. According to CompuBox Stats, Lomachenko landed 72 of 249 shots (29%), and Crolla landed only 12 of his 96 thrown (13%), this included 7 power shots, compared to Lomachenko's 58 power shots.

In the post-fight press conference, Lomachenko said he thought it was a clear waving of the fight by Reiss, who had his back to Lomachenko and entered the exchange in a manner intent on protecting Crolla.

==== Lomachenko vs. Campbell ====
Lomachenko faced fellow 2012 Olympic gold medallist Luke Campbell on 31 August 2019, at The O2 Arena in London in front of a sold-out crowd of over 18,000. Lomachenko retained the WBA, WBO and The Ring lightweight titles, and gained the vacant WBC lightweight title by defeating Campbell by unanimous decision. He was in fine form, winning by 119–108 on two judges' cards, and 118–109 on the other. Despite being a heavy underdog, Campbell started well and took the first round. Lomachenko soon found his groove, however, and almost had Campbell down in the 5th round but for the bell. Campbell took more shots in round 6, but fired back and the fight remained competitive. Lomachenko knocked down Campbell in the 11th round after a series of body shots followed by a stiff jab. Campbell beat the count, and ultimately survived the round and the fight, receiving credit after the bout for his resilience. In his in-ring interview, Lomachenko called for a lightweight unification fight with the winner of Richard Commey vs. Teófimo López, who contested for the IBF title in December.

==== Lomachenko vs. López ====
In September 2020, Lomachenko agreed to fight newly crowned undefeated IBF lightweight champion, Teófimo López, on 17 October 2020 at the MGM Grand Conference Center in Paradise, Nevada. With no live audience due to the COVID-19 pandemic, Lomachenko suffered the second defeat of his career, losing by UD with the scorecards reading 116–112, 117–111, and 119–109. Judge Julie Lederman's scorecard of 119–109, was criticized for giving Lomachenko only a single round. The first seven rounds saw López staying behind his jab and going to the body, with Lomachenko offering little in response. In the second half, Lomachenko started coming out more offensively, landing more punches. In the final round, López landed 50 of 98 punches thrown (51%), the most an opponent has landed on Lomachenko in a round. According to CompuBox stats, Lomachenko landed 141 of 321 thrown (44%), while López landed 183 of 659 thrown (28%). Days after the fight, Lomachenko underwent surgery on his right shoulder.

López declined to give Lomachenko a rematch, explaining that "everybody [in Lomachenko's camp] was being a dick to me, my father. He [Lomachenko] didn't want to put a rematch clause in our contract."

According to Nielsen Media Research, the fight averaged 2,729,000 viewers and peaked at 2,898,000 viewers. The highest viewership for any boxing in the United States since Manny Pacquiao vs. Jeff Horn in 2017. Bob Arum estimated more than 4 million viewers watched including ESPN Deportes and ESPN+.

==== Lomachenko vs. Nakatani ====
Lomachenko made his comeback in a fight against Masayoshi Nakatani on 26 June 2021. Lomachenko and Nakatani both shared a common loss to undefeated unified lightweight champion Teófimo López, which Lomachenko cited as the reason why he chose Nakatani as his next opponent, saying, "I want to compare myself with this guy, he was close with [López] in their fight." Nakatani had a 6-inch height and reach advantage over Lomachenko. The fight against Nakatani was only the second fight of Lomachenko's career in which a world title was not at stake, after his professional debut against José Luis Ramírez in 2013. On the night, Lomachenko scored a knockdown in the fifth round en route to a ninth-round technical knockout victory. After the fight, he made clear his intentions of wanting to rematch López in the winter, saying, "December, January, February. I'm waiting."

==== Lomachenko vs. Commey ====
In an attempt to put his name back into contention for a shot at his old titles, Lomachenko agreed to face former IBF lightweight champion, Richard Commey, on 11 December 2021 in New York. On fight night Lomachenko was listed as a 10-1 favorite.

Lomachenko dropped Commey in the seventh round courtesy of a left hook, later pleading with the corner of the still unsteady Commey to stop the fight. They refused, and Commey survived and went the full 12 rounds. The judges scored it 119–108, 119–108, and 117–110, all for Lomachenko. When asked about fighting newly crowned unified lightweight champion, George Kambosos Jr., who had upset Teofimo López a few weeks previously, Lomachenko jumped at the idea, stating that he 'needs this chance' and would be willing to fly to Australia if necessary.

==== Cancelled Kambosos fight ====
In December 2021, Top Rank president, Todd DuBoef stated Lomachenko would fight in the first half of 2022, with a fight against newly crowned unified lightweight champion Kambosos on the cards. Kambosos was now insistent that he make his first world title defence in Australia, preferably a stadium, having been on the road for his last seven fights, going back to 2017. Lomachenko was Arum's first choice to land the fight. Eddie Hearn, promoter of WBC champion Devin Haney, was also trying to secure the fight for his boxer against Kambosos. Arum felt Lomachenko would make more commercial sense, as Haney was not well known, due to limited exposure. On 15 February 2022, ESPN reported that Kambosos would fight on 5 June at Marvel Stadium in Melbourne, Australia, with Lomachenko as the frontrunner. Lomachenko had agreed his side of the deal, which included a rematch clause for a return bout in Australia if Lomachenko was successful.

On 24 February, plans changed when Russia launched an invasion of Ukraine, which saw Lomachenko return to his home country to aid in the war effort. Arum was hopeful the fight with Kambosos could still take place in the fall. On 20 March, Lomachenko was given permission to leave Ukraine in order to face Kambosos in Australia. However, he declined, opting to stay and fight for his country. This allowed Haney to travel to Australia and challenge Kambosos. DuBoef told Sky Sports that Lomachenko would need to make a decision after their fight, as all parties agreed he should fight the winner. In June, Kambosos lost his titles to WBC champion Devin Haney, who thereby became the undisputed lightweight champion.

==== Lomachenko vs. Ortiz ====
On 7 July 2022, Top Rank president, Todd DuBoef, indicated Lomachenko was planning a return to the boxing ring in October. On 17 August, Lomachenko agreed to fight former sparring partner, 26 year old Jamaine Ortiz (16–0–1, 8 KOs), headlining a Top Rank ESPN card. The fight was a huge step up in competition for Ortiz, who burst onto the scene following his win over former world champion Jamel Herring in May. A week later it was confirmed the fight would take place on 29 October 2022, Lomachenko's first fight in 10 months, at the Hulu Theatre at Madison Square Garden in New York. Arum praised Lomachenko and said of the fight, "Vasiliy Lomachenko is a credit to his country and the sport of boxing. When his country needed him, Vasiliy did not hesitate. We are thrilled that he is safe and fighting once again at Hulu Theater at Madison Square Garden, his home away from home. Jamaine Ortiz is a young, hungry, undefeated fighter who understands that a victory over a living legend like Loma would be life-changing." A win here for Lomachenko would move him closer to challenging the winner of the Haney vs. Kambosos rematch. Lomachenko weighed 134.6 pounds, while Ortiz, who was jeered weighed 134 pounds.

After a very competitive 12 round battle, in front of 4,586 in the arena, Lomachenko emerged victorious with a unanimous decision, the three judges scoring the fight 115–113, 116–112, and 117–111. Despite the pressure from Lomachenko in the opening round, Ortiz's counter punching caused a red mark under his right eye. The injury worsened in the second round after a clash of heads. Ortiz's eye began to swell after Lomachenko picked up the pace in the fifth round, landing combinations. In the ninth, Lomachenko forced Ortiz to hold after badly wobbling him, only for Ortiz to come back strong in the final minute. Lomachenko did the better work in the championship rounds, showing his experience. Ortiz had only previously been the 10-round distance prior to this bout. Ortiz believed he won the fight. In the post-fight, he said, "I thought I won the fight. Decision is what it is. I thought this was gonna be my night." Lomachenko stated he wanted to be more active going forward. He also praised Ortiz for his efforts. Lomachenko was credited with landed 125 of 571 punches thrown (22%) and Ortiz landed 122 of 607 thrown (20%). Ortiz out-landed Lomachenko 107–92 in power shots landed.

==== Lomachenko vs. Haney ====
On 29 March 2023, it was confirmed that Lomachenko would take on undisputed lightweight champion Devin Haney on 20 May 2023 at the MGM Grand Garden Arena, Paradise, Nevada, U.S. With Lomachenko coming in as the underdog for the first time in his career, much of the bout turned out to be closely contested, with both men finding success, Lomachenko scoring with clean combinations to the head, while Haney countered consistently with solid body shots. Late in the fight, Lomachenko became increasingly dominant, finding particular success in the 10th and 11th rounds. However, Haney rallied to win the final round on all three judges' scorecards.

Ultimately, Lomachenko suffered his third professional defeat, losing via unanimous decision with scores of 116–112, 115–113 and 115–113, all in favor of the champion Haney who retained his world titles. However, the decision was greatly disputed, as many onlookers felt Lomachenko had done enough to win, including fellow boxers Shakur Stevenson and Jorge Linares, who had previously predicted a Haney victory. Judge Dave Moretti's scorecard, giving round 10 to Haney despite Lomachenko dominating that round, was heavily criticised. Others argued that as the fight had been close, a narrow result for Haney was not unreasonable. CompuBox punch stats suggested Lomachenko had landed 124 of 564 punches thrown (22%), while Haney landed 110 of 405 (27%), with both boxers outlanding the other in five rounds each, the other two rounds being even. Lomachenko believed he had won and his team subsequently stated they would file an appeal regarding the result. Haney on his part praised Lomachenko, calling him his toughest opponent yet.

Regardless of the result, the fight and the performances of both men were widely praised. It was described by multiple accounts as "thrilling", with Lomachenko's display against a substantially younger and larger opponent being highly lauded.

==== Lomachenko vs. Kambosos ====
On 16 August 2023, Arum squashed rumours that Lomachenko was ducking Shakur Stevenson. Stevenson also posted tweets labelling Lomachenko a "chicken". Arum stated the Lomachenko declined a fight with Stevenson due to the ongoing Russian-Ukraine conflict. Arum also denied rumours that Lomachenko would fight George Kambosos Jr. (21–2, 10 KOs) in Australia. According to Arum, Lomachenko would not discuss any fights for the remainder of 2023. In November 2023, Kambobos' promoter Lou DiBella said a fight between the two would happen in Spring of 2024. During an interview on 19 December, Arum said, "We're trying to finalize a world title fight at 135 pounds between Lomachenko and Kambosos. I really believe we've made a lot of progress. I believe that fight will happen sometime in April in Australia. I'm looking forward to it. Australia is a great country." The title in question was believed to be the vacant IBF lightweight belt. The belt was made vacant by Devin Haney, who decided to move up a weight class. A deal was finalised on 14 January 2024 to take place in Australia on 12 May for the vacant IBF title. On 31 January, the fight was made official to take place at the RAC Arena in Perth, Australia. The fight would air primetime in the United States on 11 May. During a presser, Lomachenko said his goal was to win the IBF title, and then aim for undisputed. Lomachenko admitted he was at the later stages of his career. He had found it more difficult after recent fights for his body recover. He was always the smaller man in the ring with anyone he fought in the lightweight division. Lomachenko weighed 134.9 pounds and Kambosos weighed 134.2 pounds.

The fight took place in front of a sold-out crowd of 14,147. In one of his most dominant performances of recent years, Lomachenko won the fight by TKO in the 11th round to become win the vacant IBF world title. With the win, he had now won a world title from all four major organizations. Lomachenko was in control throughout the fight, however Kambosos was credited for not giving up. By round 8, Kambosos had a cut on his right eyelid and in the ninth, he had blood streaming down his face. He dropped Kambosos once with body shots before downing him again soon after with a continued body attack, after which the referee stopped the fight, with Kambosos' corner throwing in the towel at the same time.

According to CompuBox, Kambosos landed just 40 of his 371 punches (11%), compared to Lomachenko's 175 of 480 (37%). After the fight, Kambosos paid respect, stating, "He's a legend of the sport ... He's one of the best fighters in history." Arum called it a "vintage Loma performance." At the time of stoppage, Lomachenko was ahead 99–91 (twice) and 98–92 on the scorecards. Lomachenko gave no indication on what he wanted to do next in his career, but regaining a world title was a start.

==== Failed Gervonta Davis negotiations ====
Following Lomachenko's victory over Kambosos, discussions for a unification bout against undefeated WBA lightweight champion Gervonta Davis commenced, with both sides initially showing interest. However, in July 2024, Lomachenko's manager Egis Klimas announced that talks had been cut short, due to Lomachenko refusing the fight: "Loma is not in the mood right now, he doesn't have the motivation at the moment. He's taking off, he wants to spend more time with the family. He doesn't want to do anything until the end of the year. So he's definitely not coming to the ring until the end of the year."

=== Retirement ===
After hinting at retirement since the beginning of 2025, Lomachenko officially announced his retirement on 5 June via a video he posted on his social media channels. In the video, he said:

"I'm grateful for every victory and defeat inside the ring and outside the ring. I'm thankful that as my career comes to an end, I've gained clarity about the direction a person must take in order to achieve true victory, not just in the ring.

I thank God for my honest and wonderful and kind parents for their care, love and warmth I've felt throughout my life. My father taught me not only boxing, but how to be a role model for my own children.

I've made many mistakes in life and in the gym but he was always by my side, correcting me when needed. I have many warm memories.

To my family, you have always stood by me. You shared in my victories and you felt the pain of my losses. Those losses only made us stronger."

Lomachenko also paid tribute to his father and trainer. There were multiple tribute posts from boxing media and his peers later that day praising Lomachenko for what he achieved in his career. He finished his professional career with 18 wins from 21 fights. 17 were world title fights.

=== Return at junior lightweight ===
On 12 May 2026, it was announced that Lomachenko would come out of retirement for a fight at the end of the year. Ring Magazine indicated that Lomachenko's contract with Top Rank expired on 12 May, making him a promotional free agent however did not rule him out of working with Top Rank in the future. For his return, Lomachenko wanted to target high-profile opponents only, rather than easy fights. Unified IBF and WBO super featherweight champion Emanuel Navarrete, was mentioned as a possible opponent, and then another high-profile fight against Gervonta Davis was a possible target. The WBO stated it would allow Lomachenko to challenge Navarrete, but only after Navarrete fulfilled his mandatory obligation, against Charly Suarez.

A return date in November 2026 was being reported with Suarez as a potential opponent. On 3 November, it was reported that a fight against Suarez (19–0, 11 KOs) was being planned to take place on 13 February 2027, with the winner earning a shot at unified champion O’Shaquie Foster. Lomachenko gave credit to his manager Egis Klimas for supporting his comeback. Klimas said, “I’m so happy Vasiliy has decided to return to the ring. He still has unfinished business and a dream that means so much to him: becoming the undisputed champion.” On 5 November, Lomachenko, along with his own Loma Power Promotions, signed a co-promotional, multi-year deal with Top Rank.

== Personal life ==
Lomachenko is a devout Orthodox Christian. He is a proud member of the Russian Orthodox Church (Ukrainian Orthodox Church – Moscow Patriarchate).

Lomachenko is married to Olena, and they have two children. As of 2019 (and since at least 2016), he lives in Camarillo, California, and trains in nearby Oxnard, just north of Los Angeles.

The face tattooed on Lomachenko's torso is that of his father and trainer, Anatoly Lomachenko.

During the 2022 Russian invasion of Ukraine, Lomachenko joined the Ukrainian army on paper. Lomachenko was in Greece when the invasion began (on 24 February 2022), and his flight home to Ukraine the next day was delayed due to air traffic being grounded. He managed to get into Ukraine by flying to Bucharest and travelling through Romania on 26 February 2022. He followed Ukrainian brothers Wladimir Klitschko and Vitali Klitschko, former heavyweight boxing champions, who also announced their pledge to protect the capital of Ukraine, Kyiv, in February 2022. Upon his return to Ukraine, Lomachenko joined the territorial defense battalion of his hometown of Bilhorod-Dnistrovskyi on 27 February 2022.

== Fighting style ==
Lomachenko is known for his exceptional footwork, head movement, speed, ability to switch stances, and skill at throwing punches at uncanny angles. Lomachenko's inspirations include Muhammad Ali, Mike Tyson, and Roy Jones Jr.

== Professional boxing record ==
21 fights	18 wins	3 losses
By knockout	12	0
By decision	6	3

No.	Result	Record	Opponent	Type	Round, time	Date	Location	Notes
21	Win	18–3	George Kambosos Jr.	TKO	11 (12), 2:49	12 May 2024	RAC Arena, Perth, Australia	Won IBO and vacant IBF lightweight titles
20	Loss	17–3	Devin Haney	UD	12	20 May 2023	MGM Grand Garden Arena, Paradise, Nevada, US	For WBA (Super), WBC, IBF, WBO, and The Ring lightweight titles
19	Win	17–2	Jamaine Ortiz	UD	12	29 Oct 2022	Hulu Theater, New York City, New York, US	
18	Win	16–2	Richard Commey	UD	12	11 Dec 2021	Madison Square Garden, New York City, New York, US	Won vacant WBO Inter-Continental lightweight title
17	Win	15–2	Masayoshi Nakatani	TKO	9 (12), 1:48	26 Jun 2021	Virgin Hotels Las Vegas, Paradise, Nevada, US	
16	Loss	14–2	Teofimo Lopez	UD	12	17 Oct 2020	MGM Grand Conference Center, Paradise, Nevada, US	Lost WBA (Super), WBO, and The Ring lightweight titles; For IBF lightweight title
15	Win	14–1	Luke Campbell	UD	12	31 Aug 2019	The O2 Arena, London, England	Retained WBA (Super), WBO, and The Ring lightweight titles; Won vacant WBC lightweight title
14	Win	13–1	Anthony Crolla	KO	4 (12), 0:58	12 Apr 2019	Staples Center, Los Angeles, California, US	Retained WBA (Super), WBO, and The Ring lightweight titles
13	Win	12–1	José Pedraza	UD	12	8 Dec 2018	Hulu Theater, New York City, New York, US	Retained WBA (Super) and The Ring lightweight titles; Won WBO lightweight title
12	Win	11–1	Jorge Linares	TKO	10 (12), 2:08	12 May 2018	Madison Square Garden, New York City, New York, US	Won WBA (Super) and The Ring lightweight titles
11	Win	10–1	Guillermo Rigondeaux	RTD	6 (12), 3:00	9 Dec 2017	The Theater at Madison Square Garden, New York City, New York, US	Retained WBO junior lightweight title
10	Win	9–1	Miguel Marriaga	RTD	7 (12), 3:00	5 Aug 2017	Microsoft Theater, Los Angeles, California, US	Retained WBO junior lightweight title
9	Win	8–1	Jason Sosa	RTD	9 (12), 3:00	8 Apr 2017	MGM National Harbor, Oxon Hill, Maryland, US	Retained WBO junior lightweight title
8	Win	7–1	Nicholas Walters	RTD	7 (12), 3:00	26 Nov 2016	Cosmopolitan of Las Vegas, Paradise, Nevada, US	Retained WBO junior lightweight title
7	Win	6–1	Román Martínez	KO	5 (12), 1:09	11 Jun 2016	The Theater at Madison Square Garden, New York City, New York, US	Won WBO junior lightweight title
6	Win	5–1	Romulo Koasicha	KO	10 (12), 2:35	7 Nov 2015	Thomas & Mack Center, Paradise, Nevada, US	Retained WBO featherweight title
5	Win	4–1	Gamalier Rodríguez	KO	9 (12), 0:50	2 May 2015	MGM Grand Garden Arena, Paradise, Nevada, US	Retained WBO featherweight title
4	Win	3–1	Chonlatarn Piriyapinyo	UD	12	22 Nov 2014	Cotai Arena, Macau, SAR	Retained WBO featherweight title
3	Win	2–1	Gary Russell Jr.	MD	12	21 Jun 2014	StubHub Center, Carson, California, US	Won vacant WBO featherweight title
2	Loss	1–1	Orlando Salido	SD	12	1 Mar 2014	Alamodome, San Antonio, Texas, US	For vacant WBO featherweight title
1	Win	1–0	José Luis Ramírez	KO	4 (10), 2:59	12 Oct 2013	Thomas & Mack Center, Paradise, Nevada, US	Won WBO International featherweight title

== Titles in boxing ==
=== Major world titles ===
- WBO featherweight champion (126 lbs)
- WBO super featherweight champion (130 lbs)
- WBA (Super) lightweight champion (135 lbs)
- WBC lightweight champion (135 lbs)
- IBF lightweight champion (135 lbs)
- WBO lightweight champion (135 lbs)

=== The Ring magazine titles ===
- The Ring lightweight champion (135 lbs)

=== Regional/International titles ===
- WBO International featherweight champion (126 lbs)
- WBO Inter-Continental lightweight champion (135 lbs)

=== Honorary titles ===
- WBC Franchise lightweight champion
- WBA Man of Triumph Gold champion
- WBO Super Champion

== Boxing awards ==
- Val Barker Trophy: 2008
- The Ring magazine Prospect of the Year: 2013
- The Ring magazine Fighter of the Year: 2017
- Sugar Ray Robinson Award: 2017
- Las Vegas Review-Journal Fighter of the Year: 2017
- El Paso Times Fighter of the Year: 2017
- WBO Fighter of the Year: 2019
- CBS Sports Fighter of the Year: 2016
- HBO Sports Fighter of the Year: 2016, 2017
- WBN Fighter of the Year: 2016
- WBN Stoppage of the Year: 2016
- WBN Pound for Pound Breakthrough: 2016
- WBN World Title Prospect of 2014: 2013
- ESPN Prospect of the Year: 2013
- Yahoo Sports Prospect of the Year: 2013
- WBA Fight of the Year: 2018
- BWAA John McCain-Bill Crawford Courage Award: 2022

== Pay-per-view bouts ==
United States
No.	Date	Fight	Buys	Network	Revenue
1	May 20, 2023	Haney vs. Lomachenko	150,000	ESPN	$9,000,000
	Total sales		150,000		$9,000,000

== See also ==
- List of featherweight boxing champions
- List of super-featherweight boxing champions
- List of lightweight boxing champions
- List of boxing triple champions

== Notes ==
Sporting positions
Regional boxing titles
Preceded by José Ramírez	WBO International featherweight champion 12 October 2013 – February 2014; Vacated	Vacant Title next held by Marvin Sonsona
Vacant Title last held by Francesco Patera	WBO Inter-Continental lightweight champion 11 December 2021 – April 2022; Vacated	Vacant Title next held by Isaac Cruz
Major world boxing titles
Vacant Title last held by Orlando Salido	WBO featherweight champion 21 June 2014 – 21 July 2016; Vacated	Vacant Title next held by Óscar Valdez
Preceded by Román Martínez	WBO junior lightweight champion 11 June 2016 – 23 May 2018; Vacated	Vacant Title next held by Masayuki Ito
Vacant Title last held by Juan Manuel Márquez	WBA lightweight champion Super title 12 May 2018 – 17 October 2020	Succeeded by Teófimo López
Preceded by Jorge Linares	The Ring lightweight champion 12 May 2018 – 17 October 2020	Succeeded by Teófimo López
Preceded by José Pedraza	WBO lightweight champion 8 December 2018 – 17 October 2020	Succeeded by Teófimo López
Vacant Title last held by Mikey Garcia	WBC lightweight champion 31 August 2019 – 23 October 2019; Status changed to Franchise champion	Succeeded by Devin Haney
Vacant Title last held by Devin Haney	IBF lightweight champion 12 May 2024 – 9 June 2025; Retired	Succeeded by Raymond Muratalla; Interim champion promoted
Awards
Previous: Keith Thurman	The Ring Prospect of the Year; 2013	Next: Anthony Joshua
Previous: David Price	ESPN Prospect of the Year; 2013	Next: Félix Verdejo
Achievements
Preceded by Terence Crawford	BWAA pound for pound #1 boxer 1 May 2018 – 18 December 2019	Succeeded by Canelo Álvarez
Preceded by Gennady Golovkin	The Ring pound for pound #1 boxer 18 September 2018 – 7 November 2019	Succeeded by Canelo Álvarez
Records
Preceded by Saensak Muangsurin; 3	Fewest professional fights to win a major world title 3; 21 June 2014 – present	Incumbent
Preceded by Naoya Inoue; 8	Fewest professional fights to win a major world title in two weight classes 7; 11 June 2016 – present	Incumbent
Preceded by Kazuto Ioka; 18	Fewest professional fights to win a major world title in three weight classes 12; 12 May 2018 – present With: Kosei Tanaka	Incumbent
