= Sonny Fredrickson =

American boxer (born 1994)

Personal information
- Nickname: Pretty Boi
- Nationality: American
- Born: July 15, 1994 (age 32) Toledo, Ohio, U.S.
- Height: 6 ft 1 in (185 cm)
- Weight: Light welterweight

Boxing career
- Reach: 76 in (193 cm)
- Stance: Orthodox

Boxing record
- Total fights: 27
- Wins: 21
- Win by KO: 14
- Losses: 6

Sonny Leonard Fredrickson (born July 15, 1994) is an American professional boxer who held the IBF-USBA light welterweight title from 2018 to 2019.

== Amateur career ==
Fredrickson had an amateur record of 120–8 (60 KO's). Highlights of his amateur career include a 2013 National PAL Bronze Medal (141 lbs), a final eight appearance in the 2013 National Golden Gloves, five Toledo Golden Gloves Championships and two Ohio State Junior Olympics Championships.

== Professional career ==
Fredrickson trains at the New generation Boxing Gym in Toledo with trainer Lamar Wright.

On June 20, 2015 Fredrickson scored a 2nd round technical knockout over veteran Juan Santiago. The bout took place on the undercard of Andre Ward vs. Paul Smith in Oakland, California at Oracle Arena.

On May 13, 2017 Fredrickson defeated veteran Daniel Montoya via 6th round TKO in Ypsilanti, Michigan.

November 1, 2017 Fredrickson beat previously undefeated Placido Ramirez by third round KO to win the WBA Fedebol light welterweight Title in Medellín, Colombia.

On January 12, 2018 Fredrickson lost by a TKO to undefeated Shojahon Ergashev at Turning Stone Resort Casino in Verona, New York.

On November 1, 2018 Fredrickson defeated Manuel Mendez via unanimous decision to capture the IBF-USBA light welterweight title.

== Personal life ==
On October 11, 2014 Fredrickson participated in a taco eating contest at a Toledo restaurant to raise money for local charities. In December 2015, he donated his time to a local food bank, and in June 2017 he donated time and money to Ronald McDonald House in his native Toledo.
