= Subaru Murata =

Japanese professional boxer

Personal information
- Nationality: Japanese
- Born: 村田昴; 19 October 1996 (age 29) Kinokawa, Wakayama, Japan
- Height: 5 ft 7 in (170 cm)
- Weight: Super bantamweight

Boxing career
- Stance: Southpaw

Boxing record
- Total fights: 11
- Wins: 10
- Win by KO: 10
- Losses: 1

Subaru Murata (村田昴, Murata Subaru, born October 19, 1996) is a Japanese professional boxer. He currently competes in the super-bantamweight division.

== Amateur career ==
Murata had a very successful amateur career. He won a bronze medal at the junior olympics as well and reached the quarter finals of the AIBA world championships. Domestically he won numerous Japanese domestic titles. He finished up with a record of 68–12.

== Professional career ==
Murata made his debut his debut in Las Vegas on the undercard of Vasiliy Lomachenko vs. Masayoshi Nakatani. He knocked his opponent out in the second round... In his second fight Murata made his home debut against John Mark Tihuk of the Philippines. Murata dominated the fight and forced his opponent to retire in the 4th round. Murata knocked out unbeaten Filipino fighter Bryan James Wild on July 6, 2024, at the Korakuen Hall. So far he has a perfect record of 10 wins all by way of stoppage.

== Professional boxing record ==
11 fights	10 wins	1 loss
By knockout	10	0
By decision	0	1

No.	Result	Record	Opponent	Type	Round, time	Date	Location	Notes
11	Loss	10–1	Gabriel Santisima	UD	10	7 Feb 2026	Korakuen Hall, Tokyo, Japan	Lost WBO Asia Pacific super bantamweight title
10	Win	10–0	Yukinori Oguni	TKO	6 (12), 1:42	20 May 2025	Korakuen Hall, Tokyo, Japan	Retained WBO Asia Pacific super bantamweight title
9	Win	9–0	Joseph Ambo	KO	2 (12), 1:40	1 Feb 2025	Korakuen Hall, Tokyo, Japan	Retained WBO Asia Pacific super bantamweight title
8	Win	8–0	Kaito Yamasaki	TKO	9 (12), 2:46	5 Oct 2024	Korakuen Hall, Tokyo, Japan	Won vacant WBO Asia Pacific super bantamweight title
7	Win	7–0	Bryan James Wild	TKO	6 (10), 1:49	6 Jul 2024	Korakuen Hall, Tokyo, Japan	
6	Win	6–0	Alex Santisima Jr	KO	7 (8), 1:45	2 Mar 2024	Korakuen Hall, Tokyo, Japan	
5	Win	5–0	Juan Centeno	RTD	3 (6), 3:00	28 Jul 2023	Palms Casino Resort, Paradise, Nevada, U.S.	
4	Win	4–0	Jose Negrete	KO	1 (4), 1:47	25 Mar 2023	Save Mart Arena, Fresno, California, U.S.	
3	Win	3–0	Marvilo Aballe	KO	2 (6), 2:45	1 Oct 2022	Korakuen Hall, Tokyo, Japan	
2	Win	2–0	John Mark Tihuk	RTD	4 (6), 3:00	13 Jun 2022	Korakuen Hall, Tokyo, Japan	
1	Win	1–0	Keven Monroy	TKO	3 (4), 1:42	26 Jun 2021	Virgin Hotels, Paradise, Nevada, U.S.	
