= Masayoshi Nakatani =

Japanese boxer

Personal information
- Nationality: Japanese
- Born: March 8, 1989 (age 37) Osaka, Japan
- Height: 5 ft 11.5 in (182 cm)
- Weight: Lightweight

Boxing career
- Reach: 71 in (180 cm)
- Stance: Orthodox

Boxing record
- Total fights: 23
- Wins: 20
- Win by KO: 14
- Losses: 3

Masayoshi Nakatani (中谷 正義, Nakatani Masayoshi, born March 8, 1989) is a Japanese professional boxer. He held the OPBF lightweight title between 2014 and 2019, and won the WBO Inter-Continental lightweight title in 2020.

== Professional career ==
=== Early career ===
Nakatani fought the first 18 bouts of his professional career in his native Japan. During this time, he won the OPBF lightweight title in January 2014, and successfully defended it 11 times.

=== Rise up the ranks ===
==== Nakatani vs. López ====
After compiling a perfect record of 18-0, Nakatani made his first appearance in the ring outside of Japan when he faced fellow undefeated contender Teófimo López on July 19, 2019 in Oxon Hill, Maryland in an eliminator for the IBF lightweight title. Nakatani lost a unanimous decision, with scores of 118-110, 118-110 and 119-109.

==== Nakatani vs. Verdejo ====
On December 12, 2020 in Paradise, Nevada, Nakatani defeated Félix Verdejo by ninth-round technical knockout despite being down on all three scorecards at the time of the stoppage to capture the vacant WBO Inter-Continental lightweight title. The bout was an exciting one, with both men exchanging two knockdowns apiece. In his post-fight interview, Nakatani stated his desire to avenge his loss to Teófimo López, who had since become unified lightweight champion: “I fought Teófimo López before and I want to fight him again. That’s why I kept going tonight. I want to go for the knockout [in a rematch with López] like I did today."

==== Nakatani vs. Lomachenko ====
Nakatani returned to the ring on June 26, 2021 in Paradise, Nevada to face former three-division world champion Vasiliy Lomachenko, with whom he shares a common loss to Teófimo López. Nakatani was knocked down twice en route to a ninth-round technical knockout loss.

== Professional boxing record ==
23 fights	20 wins	3 losses
By knockout	14	2
By decision	6	1

No.	Result	Record	Opponent	Type	Round, time	Date	Location	Notes
23	Loss	20–3	Shuichiro Yoshino	KO	6 (12), 1:14	Nov 1, 2022	Saitama Super Arena, Saitama, Japan	For WBO Asia Pacific lightweight title
22	Win	20–2	Harmonito Dela Torre	KO	1 (10), 1:16	Jun 13, 2022	Korakuen Hall, Tokyo, Japan	
21	Loss	19–2	Vasiliy Lomachenko	TKO	9 (12), 1:48	Jun 26, 2021	Virgin Hotels Las Vegas, Paradise, Nevada, US	
20	Win	19–1	Félix Verdejo	TKO	9 (10), 1:45	Dec 12, 2020	MGM Grand Conference Center, Paradise, Nevada, U.S.	Won vacant WBO Inter-Continental lightweight title
19	Loss	18–1	Teófimo López	UD	12	Jul 19, 2019	MGM National Harbor, Oxon Hill, Maryland, U.S.	
18	Win	18–0	Hurricane Futa	TKO	4 (12), 1:43	Dec 9, 2018	Edion Arena, Osaka, Japan	Retained OPBF lightweight title
17	Win	17–0	Izuki Tomioka	TKO	11 (12), 2:40	Jul 29, 2018	Edion Arena, Osaka, Japan	Retained OPBF lightweight title
16	Win	16–0	Amphol Suriyo	KO	6 (12), 1:45	Feb 24, 2018	Edion Arena, Osaka, Japan	Retained OPBF lightweight title
15	Win	15–0	Ryan Sermona	TKO	4 (12)	Sep 3, 2017	Shimazu Arena, Kyoto, Japan	Retained OPBF lightweight title
14	Win	14–0	Krai Setthaphon	UD	12	Apr 9, 2017	Edion Arena, Osaka, Japan	Retained OPBF lightweight title
13	Win	13–0	Allan Tanada	TKO	7 (12), 1:35	Nov 11, 2016	Central Gym, Kobe, Japan	Retained OPBF lightweight title
12	Win	12–0	Tosho Makoto Aoki	TKO	1 (12), 1:19	Apr 17, 2016	Edion Arena, Osaka, Japan	Retained OPBF lightweight title
11	Win	11–0	Kazuya Murata	RTD	5 (12), 3:00	Aug 28, 2015	Central Gym, Kobe, Japan	Retained OPBF lightweight title
10	Win	10–0	Accel Sumiyoshi	UD	12	Apr 5, 2015	Prefectural Gymnasium, Osaka, Japan	Retained OPBF lightweight title
9	Win	9–0	Futoshi Usami	UD	12	Oct 28, 2014	Central Gym, Kobe, Japan	Retained OPBF lightweight title
8	Win	8–0	Ricky Sismundo	UD	12	May 7, 2014	Bodymaker Colosseum, Osaka, Japan	Retained OPBF lightweight title
7	Win	7–0	Yoshitaka Kato	MD	12	Jan 11, 2014	Korakuen Hall, Tokyo, Japan	Won OPBF lightweight title
6	Win	6–0	Shuhei Tsuchiya	KO	3 (8), 1:58	Jul 25, 2013	Korakuen Hall, Tokyo, Japan	
5	Win	5–0	Weerayuth Patangwesang	KO	2 (8), 2:16	Apr 26, 2013	Central Gym, Kobe, Japan	
4	Win	4–0	Ronnel Esparas	KO	1 (8), 2:45	Aug 12, 2012	Central Gym, Kobe, Japan	
3	Win	3–0	Roel Laguna	TKO	5 (6), 1:32	Mar 20, 2012	IMP Hall, Osaka, Japan	
2	Win	2–0	Tetsuto Sebiyo Tonomura	UD	6	Oct 2, 2011	IMP Hall, Osaka, Japan	
1	Win	1–0	Katsuhisa Shiokawa	TKO	4 (4), 1:35	Jun 12, 2011	IMP Hall, Osaka, Japan	
