= Vasiliy Lomachenko vs. Teófimo López =

2020 boxing match in Nevada

Winner Takes All
- Date: October 17, 2020
- Venue: MGM Grand Conference Center, Paradise, Nevada, U.S.
- Title(s) on the line: WBA (Super), IBF, WBO, WBC (Franchise), and The Ring lightweight titles

Tale of the tape
Boxer	(Ukraine) Vasiliy Lomachenko	(United States) Teófimo López
Nickname	"Loma"	"The Takeover"
Hometown	Bilhorod-Dnistrovskyi, Odesa Oblast, Ukraine	Brooklyn, New York, U.S.
Purse	$3,250,000	$1,500,000
Pre-fight record	14–1 (10 KO)	15–0 (12 KO)
Age	32 years, 8 months	23 years, 2 months
Height	5 ft 7 in (170 cm)	5 ft 8 in (173 cm)
Weight	135 lb (61 kg)	135 lb (61 kg)
Style	Southpaw	Orthodox
Recognition	WBA, WBO and The Ring; Lightweight Champion; TBRB; No. 1 Ranked Lightweight; No. 1 ranked pound-for-pound fighter by ESPN; 3-division world champion	IBF; Lightweight Champion; The Ring; No. 1 Ranked Lightweight; TBRB; No. 2 Ranked Lightweight

Result
- López wins via 12-round unanimous decision (116–112, 119–109, 117–111)

Vasiliy Lomachenko vs. Teófimo López, billed as Winner Takes All, was a unification professional boxing match contested between WBA (Super), WBO, WBC (Franchise) and The Ring lightweight champion, Vasiliy Lomachenko, and IBF lightweight champion, Teófimo López. The bout took place on October 17, 2020, at the MGM Grand Conference Center in Paradise, Nevada. López defeated Lomachenko via unanimous decision (UD) with the judges' scorecards reading 119–109, 117–111, and 116–112.

== Background ==
López scored a second-round technical knockout victory against Richard Commey to capture the IBF lightweight title on December 14, 2019. In the same month, Lomachenko announced there was an agreement to face the newly crowned champion in a unification bout in April, saying, "On paper, there is an agreement that the match is going to happen, and it's going to happen in April. However, they have not yet established a date. This fight is happening in April." With the fight between Lomachenko and Lopez agreed, Arum set out possible venues. With the fight likely taking place in May 2020, Arum hinted the fight could take place in Saudi Arabia. Lomachenko admitted he did not learn anything about Lopez in his recent win over Commey. On February 8, López hinted at a date and location for the fight on Twitter, with lyrics from the song "New York, New York", posting, "May 30th. Start spreadin' the news, I'm leaving today, I want to be a part of it. PP_?". The proposed date was eventually scrapped due to the COVID-19 pandemic, with Lomachenko going back to his native home of Ukraine. Lopez accused team Lomachenko for making the negotiations difficult. Egis Klimas responded the only wait was finding the venue.

Bob Arum, promoter of both fighters, offered each an interim bout to take place in July, which both rejected. Arum stated the new date being looked at would be September. After October was chosen as a new date, the fight appeared to be in jeopardy due to a pay dispute from López, who was unhappy with an offer of $1.25m while Lomachenko was set to earn in excess of $3.5m. With López' manager, David McWater explaining, "We think that [Lomachenko] probably deserves more money, but not three times as much. We’re hoping that there is enough impetus to get this fight done, and Top Rank will come back and talk to us". According to Arum, Lomachenko agreed to reduce his own purse in order to get the fight across the line. It was reported that Lopez would receive closer to $2 million.

On September 8, after weeks of difficult negotiations, the bout was finally announced for October 17, with the venue set for the Top Rank Bubble, located at the MGM Grand Conference Center in Paradise, Nevada. Originally, the plan was for the card to be PPV. Arum praised ESPN for their efforts to have the card broadcast for cable and satellite viewers. He said, “What I’m most proud of is it’s clearly the best fight since the pandemic started. It would’ve been a major fight even without the pandemic, and now it’s being shown to the public without an extra charge. Nobody has to pay 5 cents to watch it. You don’t even have to be subscribed for $4.99 a month to watch it on ESPN+. If they’re a cable subscriber or a satellite subscriber, they get it for nothing.” Arum believed it would feel indelicate to ask the public to pay up to $70 for the event. This way the fight would be available to approximately 80 million homes.

There was no rematch clause in place for the fight. Lopez said this on the Ak And Barak Show. Arum later confirmed this stating if the fight warranted a rematch, the two boxers would eventually agree to the terms, without being contractually obliged. Arum said rematch clauses were overused and criticised Eddie Hearn, saying, "He puts a rematch clause in every contract, and that may indicate that he is not confident in how his fighter will perform." No tickets went on sale for the event. It was reported that 250 people would be allowed to attend under the NSAC's new protocols. Those attending would be a number of guests per fighter, a few reporters and mostly first responders from Nevada.

During fight week, Lopez hit out at reporters about Lomachenko giving up some of his purse. He said, “He never gave me money. I don’t know why people keep saying that sh-t. I thought I cleared that out a long time ago. Nah, man, my pride kicks in when that happens. I won’t ever take somebody else’s paycheck. You know what I mean?" The main reason Lopez was able to be offered more money was down to ESPN deciding not to have the fight behind a paywall. Both boxers weighed on the 135 pound limit. Neither wore masks during the face-off and the final hurdle would be testing negative to coronavirus on fight day. Lomachenko was listed a 4-1 favorite by the sports books.

== The fight ==
López defeated Lomachenko via unanimous decision with scores of 116–112, 119–109 and 117–111. Judge Julie Lederman's scorecard of 119–109, giving Lomachenko only a single round, received significant controversy. The fight started off with López finding his jab and going to the body to slow down his opponent. The first seven rounds saw López staying behind his jab and going to the body, with Lomachenko offering little in response. In the second half, Lomachenko started coming out more offensively, landing more punches. In the final round, López landed 50 of 98 punches thrown (51%), the most an opponent has landed on Lomachenko in a round. CompuBox stats showed López was the busier of the two, landing 183 of 659 thrown (28%), while Lomachenko was more accurate landing 141 of 321 thrown (44%). López out landed Lomachenko in 8 of the 12 rounds.

== Aftermath ==
For his performance, Lopez received heaps of praise from boxing peers, past and present. Speaking after the fight, Lomachenko felt he won, but accepted defeat. He said, “I think in the first half of the fight, he got more rounds than I did, but in the second half of the fight, I took it over and I was that much better. I’m definitely not agreeing with the scorecards. I thought I won the fight, but the results are the results, and I’m not going to argue it right now."

Days after the fight, Lomachenko underwent surgery on his right shoulder. López declined to give Lomachenko a rematch, explaining that "everybody [in Lomachenko's camp] was being a dick to me, my father. He [Lomachenko] didn't want to put a rematch clause in our contract."

=== Viewership ===
The fight drew about 4.2 million viewers in the United States. When it aired live on television, it drew an average of 2,729,000 viewers and a peak of 2,898,000 viewers. On the ESPN app and ESPN+, the fight drew nearly 1.5 million viewers.

== Fight card ==
Confirmed bouts:

Weight Class		Results		Method	Round	Time	Notes
Lightweight	(United States) Teófimo López (c)	def.	(Ukraine) Vasiliy Lomachenko (c)	UD	12		^{Note 1}
Junior welterweight	(United States) Arnold Barboza Jr.	def.	(United States) Alex Saucedo	UD	10		^{Note 2}
Super middleweight	(United States) Edgar Berlanga	def.	(United States) Lanell Bellows	TKO	1/8	1:19
Welterweight	(Puerto Rico) Josue Vargas	def.	(United States) Kendo Castaneda	UD	10
Super Featherweight	(Mexico) Enrique Vivas	def.	(Philippines) John Vincent Moralde	TKO	1 (8)	1:16
Welterweight	(United States) Quinton Randall	def.	(Puerto Rico) Jan Carlos Rivera	UD	6
Welterweight	(United States) Jahi Tucker	def.	(United States) Charles Garner	UD	4

^Note 1 For Unified WBA (Super), IBF, WBO, The Ring, and lineal lightweight titles
^Note 2 For vacant WBO International junior welterweight title

== Broadcasting ==
The fight was televised live on ESPN and streamed live on ESPN+ for the U.S. (in both English and Spanish languages) viewers only.

Country/Region	Broadcaster			
Country/Region	Free	Cable-TV	PPV	Streaming
United States (host)	—N/a	ESPN	—N/a	ESPN+
United States (host)	—N/a	ESPN Deportes	—N/a	ESPN+
Ukraine	MEGOGO			
Unsold markets	—N/a		FITE TV	
Unsold markets	—N/a	Fight Sports	—N/a	Fight Sports MAX
Australia	—N/a	Fox Sports	—N/a	Foxtel Now
Australia	—N/a	Fox Sports	—N/a	Kayo Sports
France	—N/a	beIN Sports	—N/a	beIN Sports Connect
Japan	—N/a	Wowow	—N/a	Wowow
Kazakhstan	Khabar	—N/a		Khabar
Latin America: Argentina; Chile; Colombia; Ecuador; Mexico; Panama; Peru; Uruguay; Venezuela	—N/a	Space	—N/a	TNT Go
Mexico	Azteca 7	Space	—N/a	TV Azteca Deportes
Mexico	Azteca 7	Space	—N/a	Azteca En Vivo
Poland	—N/a	Polsat Sport	—N/a	IPLA
Thailand	—N/a	Fight Sports	—N/a	—N/a

Preceded by vs. Luke Campbell	Vasiliy Lomachenko's bouts October 17, 2020	Succeeded by vs. Masayoshi Nakatani
Preceded by vs. Richard Commey	Teófimo López's bouts October 17, 2020	Succeeded by vs. George Kambosos Jr.
Awards
Preceded by Anthony Joshua vs. Andy Ruiz Jr.	The Ring Upset of the Year; 2020	Succeeded by Teófimo López vs. George Kambosos Jr.
