= Félix Verdejo =

Puerto Rican boxer and convicted murderer (born 1993)

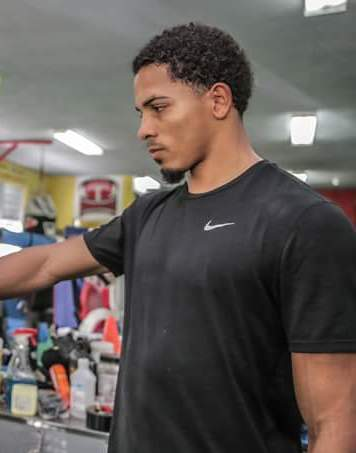
- Verdejo in 2018

Personal information
- Nickname: El Diamante ("The Diamond")
- Born: Félix Giomar Verdejo Sánchez; May 19, 1993 (age 33) San Juan, Puerto Rico
- Height: 5 ft 9 in (175 cm)
- Weight: Lightweight
- Criminal information
- Status: Incarcerated
- Convictions: killing an unborn child; kidnapping resulting in death
- Penalty: Life imprisonment
- Accomplice: Luis Antonio Cádiz-Martínez

Details
- Victims: Keishla Rodríguez Ortiz, 27 and her unborn child
- Date: April 29, 2021
- Country: Puerto Rico
- Locations: Laguna San José, San Juan
- Date apprehended: May 2, 2021
- Imprisoned at: USP Pollock

Boxing career
- Reach: 72 in (183 cm)
- Stance: Orthodox

Boxing record
- Total fights: 29
- Wins: 27
- Win by KO: 17
- Losses: 2

Félix Giomar Verdejo Sánchez (born May 19, 1993) is a Puerto Rican former professional boxer. As an amateur he represented Puerto Rico at the 2012 Olympics. Between 2012 and 2020 Verdejo competed professionally for Top Rank and held the WBO Latino lightweight title from 2015 to 2017.

In May 2021, Verdejo turned himself in to police to face federal charges in the murder of his pregnant mistress. In 2023, he was found guilty and sentenced to life in prison.

== Amateur career ==
Verdejo was the winner at lightweight at the 2012 American Boxing Olympic Qualification Tournament. Qualification was assured when Verdejo defeated a Mexican rival in the quarter-finals since the top-4 finishers qualified for the 2012 Olympics in his weight class.

At the 2012 Summer Olympics, Verdejo defeated Panamanian José Huertas in the first round with a score of 11–5. Then he defeated Tunisian Ahmed Mejri with a 16–7 score before losing to Vasyl Lomachenko of Ukraine in the quarterfinals 14–9.

Verdejo was also a Panamerican Youth Champion.

== Professional career ==
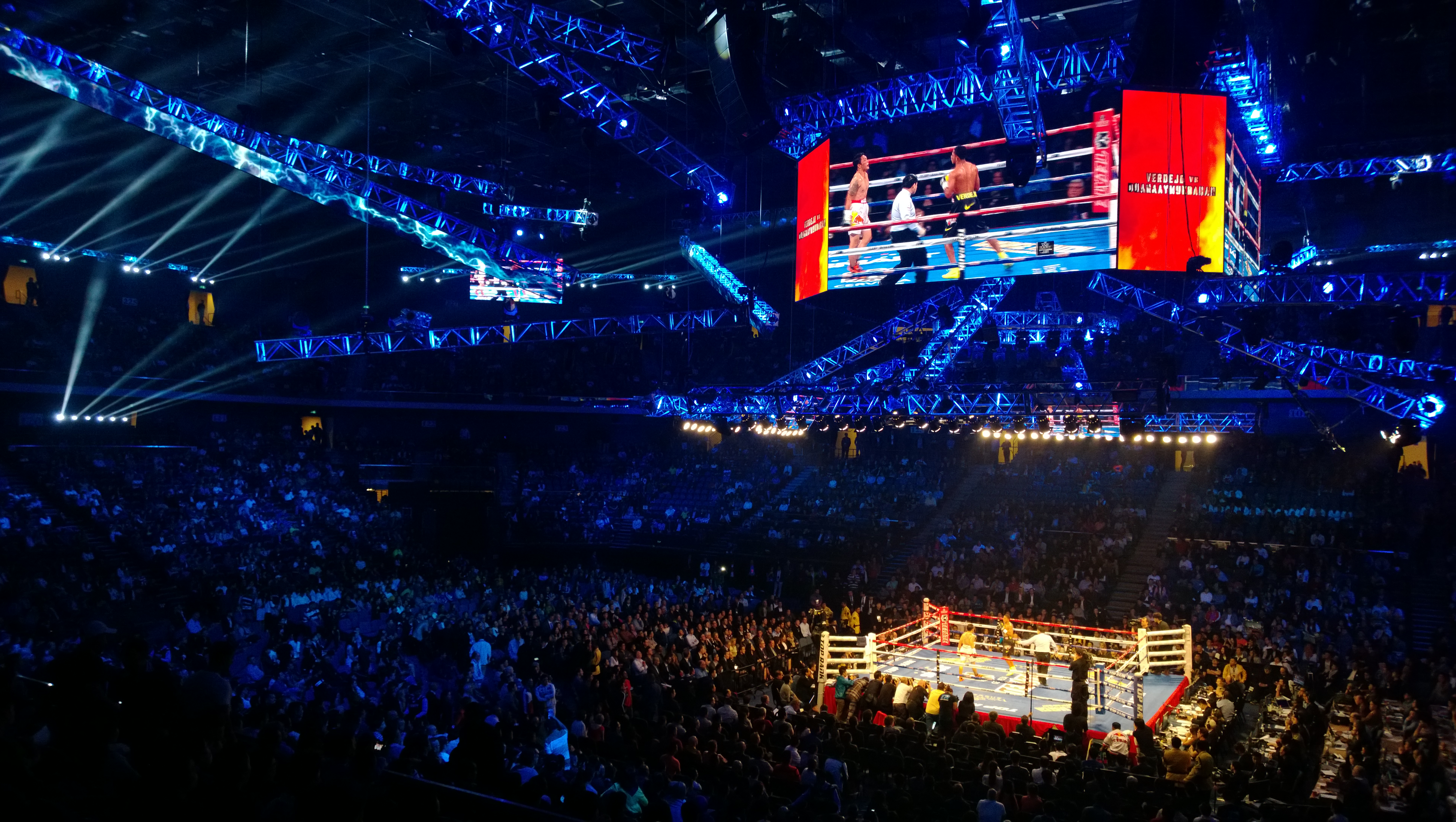
Verdejo vs. Petchsamuthr Duanaaymukdahan at CotaiArena in Macau in November 2013

=== Early career ===
In October 2012, a 19 year old Verdejo became a professional by joining Top Rank, signing for an undisclosed amount that reportedly included a bonification $600,000.

Verdejo won the "New Hispanic Promise" category of the 2013 Premios Juventud on July 18 of that year. After closing his 2013 campaign, Verdejo was voted "Prospect of the Year" by BoxingScene and Top Rank. He also finished second in Yahoo!'s list, which noted that any other year he would have been a "slam dunk winner". In his first fight of 2014, Verdejo faced undefeated Lauro Alcantar, winning by knockout in only 21 seconds. Verdejo continued his success throughout 2014, going 7–0 with 6 KO, making his career record 16–0 (KO 12). ESPN.com would go on to name Verdejo 'Prospect of the Year' for 2014.

==== WBO Latino champion ====
Verdejo would get his first chance to claim his first title, it was announced in January 2015. Top Rank announced Mexican Marco Antonio López (24–5, 15 KOs) as his opponent in a scheduled 8 round bout for February 28, however this was later changed to a 10-round bout and took place on April 25, due to Verdejo injuring his hand. The fight was contested for the vacant WBO Latino lightweight title, which was only at stake for Verdejo as Lopez weight 4 pounds over the lightweight limit. The fight took place in Puerto Rico as Verdejo claimed the vacant title via a fifth-round technical knockout. At the time of stoppage, all three judges had it 40–36 in favour of Verdejo.

Verdejo made his first defence against undefeated American Ivan Najera (16–0, 8 KOs) on June 13 at the Madison Square Garden Theater in New York City. Verdejo, making his HBO debut, defeated Najera in a wide unanimous decision to retain the title. Verdejo scored two knockdowns and outpointed Najera with two judges scoring the bout 100–88 and one judge had it 99–89. Verdejo connected with 40% of his punches thrown compared to 30% from Najera.

On December 11, Verdejo made a second successive defence of his WBO Latino title in Puerto Rico against Brazilian Josenilson Dos Santos (27–3, 17 KOs). In round two, Verdejo hit a big right hand that dropped dos Santos, although dos Santos beat the count, referee Roberto Ramirez Jr. stopped the fight after a count was given.

Verdejo started off 2016 with a defence against undefeated Brazilian William Silva (23–0, 14 KOs) on the undercard of Crawford-Lundy on February 27, 2016, at the Madison Square Garden Theater. The fight was televised on HBO. Verdejo landed 106 of 421 total punches as he cruised to a one sided 10 round unanimous decision win against Silva who connected 45 of 325 total punches. Two judges had it 100–90 for Verdejo and the third judge had it 99–91.

Verdejo would next fight two months later, returning to Puerto Rico against 29 year old Mexican Jose Luis Rodriguez (18–8, 11 KOs), who was on a four fight win streak, on April 16 in a 10-round bout at the Coliseo Roberto Clemente. Verdejo was originally supposed to fight Daniel Evangelista (18–6–2, 14 KOs), who withdrew from the fight due to tendonitis. Verdejo won a one sided 10 round unanimous decision win over Rodriguez. He won the fight by the judges scoring it 99–91, 99–91 and 98–92. Verdejo used his power and speed advantage to punish Rodriguez with big shots to the head and body throughout the ten rounds. With this win, Verdejo was guaranteed a return to HBO at the Madison Square Garden Theater on June 11 against lightweight contender Jose Felix Jr. (33–1–1, 25 KOs). Following this win, WBA ranked Verdejo at #2 lightweight and WBO ranked him #3.

Verdejo fought on the undercard of the title fight between WBO super featherweight champion Martinez vs. Lomachenko at Madison Square Garden Theater in New York on June 11, 2016. He defended his Latino title against 2nd tier Mexican boxer Juan Jose Martinez (25–2, 17 KOs), who had won six fights in a row since a seventh-round technical decision loss to Rey Bautista in September 2014. Verdejo was supposed to fight Felix Jr. however a deal could not be made, according to Top Rank vice president Carl Moretti, Felix asked for about 'four times the money available' for Verdejo's opponent. Verdejo, who had been criticized for his previous two decision wins, stopped Martinez in five rounds to retain his title. Verdejo was the aggressor, out-landing Martinez 90 to 36 and connected on 51 percent of his power shots. In Round 5, Martinez had a cut above his right eye and with 20 seconds remaining, Verdejo pinned Martinez against the ropes, before referee Michael Ortega jumped in at 2:40 and stopped the fight. Verdejo told his translator after the bout that he 'wants to fight the best'. Bob Arum spoke of the possibility of a world title fight between Verdejo and WBO champion Terry Flanagan for early November, however this would no longer be the case due to Verdejo suffering injuries in a motorcycle accident.

On December 6, 2016, Verdejo announced that he was close to returning to the ring, slated to be for February 3, 2017, in his native Puerto Rico. Weeks later Top Rank confirmed that he would indeed fight on that date against former super featherweight title challenger Oliver Flores (27–2–2, 17 KOs) at the Coliseo Roberto Clemente in San Juan. Flores is coming off a stoppage loss in December 2015 to then WBA junior lightweight champion Takashi Uchiyama. The fight will aired live on UniMas. Verdejo won the fight via a 10-round unanimous decision. The three judges scored the fight 99–91, 98–92, 96–94 all in favor or Verdejo. With the win Verdejo landed a shot at the WBO lightweight title.

==== World title mix ====
On June 12, 2017, the WBO president Francisco Valcarcel received word that promoters Bob Arum and Frank Warren were working closely together to come to an agreement for a fight to take place between Verdejo and undefeated WBO lightweight champion Terry Flanagan. Some sources claimed the fight would take place on September 9 in Manchester. There was a hold up in the negotiations due to Verdejo being offered $175,000, however his representatives were looking for him to earn in the region of $450,000 having to travel to Flanagan's home country to challenge for the title. A deal was finally reached for the fight to take place on September 16, 2017, at the Copper Box Arena in London. WBO middleweight champion Billy Joe Saunders was confirmed to take part on the same card. The fight would also mark the fight time Flanagan would fight in London. On July 17, Warren emailed Top Rank to make them aware that Flanagan had suffered a leg injury, thus postponing the fight. The WBO requested that medical evidence had to be sent to them. Flanagan's team confirmed the evidence would be sent the next day.

On August 5, 2017, Top Rank revealed that Verdejo would stay busy and fight on the September 22 undercard of Gilberto Ramírez vs. Jesse Hart in Tucson, Arizona. On August 14, Top Rank announced that Verdejo would fight Mexican boxer Antonio Lozada Jr. (37–2, 31 KOs) at the Convention Center in a 10 round bout. It would have marked the first time Lozada Jr. would ever fight professionally outside of Mexico, however Verdejo picked up an injury in training, forcing him to pull out of the fight.

In December 2017, WBO president Francisco Valcarcel stated that Verdejo would need to work his way back into the mandatory position. With Flanagan moving to light welterweight and vacating his WBO lightweight title, the WBO ordered their #1 Ray Beltrán to fight #3 Paulus Moses for the vacant title.

=== Career from 2018 ===
On December 22, 2017, it was announced that Verdejo would return to the ring after 13 months' inactivity at the Madison Square Garden Theater on March 17, 2018. A week later, Antonio Lozada Jr. was lined up to fight Verdejo. Lozada was scheduled to fight Verdejo in February 2017. In January 2018, Lozada signed the deal to make the fight official. Verdejo suffered his first loss as a professional, being stopped in round 10. Despite the ring rust, having not fought in over a year, going into the final round Verdejo was ahead 87-84 and 86-85 on two scorecards with Lozada ahead 86-85 on the remaining scorecard. In round 10, Lozada knocked Verdejo down once. After Verdejo beat the count and got to his feet, Lozada began to unload more shots which led to referee Eddie Claudio stopping the fight at 2:37 of the round.

Following his first professional career defeat, Verdejo took eight months out and returned to the ring in Puerto Rico on November 10, 2018, against Mexican journeyman Yardley Armenta Cruz. The fight took place at the Mario Quijote Morales Coliseum in Guaynabo. Verdejo returned to winning ways after stopping Cruz in round 2. It was a left hook which sent him down and he was unable to recover.

On April 20, 2019, Verdejo fought his second fight after his first loss, on the Crawford vs Khan undercard at the Madison Square Garden, against Bryan Vasquez, ranked #7 by the WBA at lightweight. Verdejo won by a 10-round unanimous decision, with the scorecards reading 97–93, 97–93, 98–92. It was a good win, but fans and media alike thought the once world-class prospect left a lot to be desired.

After that fight, some critics pointed out that Verdejo could use a new trainer in the future. In October 2019, he was announced to have met with numerous trainers in the United States, who were interested in working with him. The following month, he announced that he will be working with renowned boxing trainer Ismael Salas, known for training Cuban greats like Guillermo Rigondeaux, Luis Ortiz and Erislandy Lara, in a bid to regain control and restart his career.

In his first fight with a new trainer, Felix battled Manuel Rey Rojas to a unanimous ten-round decision. The first few rounds proved to be tougher for the Puerto Rican, but as the fight went on go got up to speed and managed to secure a clear win. Despite securing a clear win, critics were not impressed by the win, mostly because Verdejo felt like a blue-chip prospect and a star-in-making after the 2012 Olympics, but still hasn't delivered on the same level in the professional game.

On December 12, 2020, Verdejo fought for the vacant WBO Inter-Continental Lightweight title against Masayoshi Nakatani. Verdejo became the first boxer to knock down Nakatani, once in the first round and again in the fourth round. However Nakatani knocked Verdejo down twice in the ninth and the fight was stopped 1:45 into the round.

== Professional boxing record ==
| 29 fights | 27 wins | 2 losses |
|---|---|---|
| By knockout | 17 | 2 |
| By decision | 10 | 0 |

| No. | Result | Record | Opponent | Type | Round, time | Date | Location | Notes |
|---|---|---|---|---|---|---|---|---|
| 29 | Loss | 27–2 | Masayoshi Nakatani | TKO | 9 (10), 1:45 | Dec 12, 2020 | MGM Grand Conference Center, Paradise, Nevada, U.S. | For vacant WBO Inter-Continental lightweight title |
| 28 | Win | 27–1 | Will Madera | TKO | 1 (10), 2:59 | Jul 16, 2020 | MGM Grand Conference Center, Paradise, Nevada, U.S. | |
| 27 | Win | 26–1 | Manuel Rey Rojas | UD | 10 | Jan 18, 2020 | Turning Stone Resort Casino, Verona, New York, U.S. | |
| 26 | Win | 25–1 | Bryan Vásquez | UD | 10 | Apr 20, 2019 | Hulu Theater at Madison Square Garden, New York City, New York, U.S. | |
| 25 | Win | 24–1 | Yardley Armenta Cruz | KO | 2 (10), 0:24 | Nov 10, 2018 | Mario Morales Coliseum, Guaynabo, Puerto Rico | |
| 24 | Loss | 23–1 | Antonio Lozada Jr. | TKO | 10 (10), 2:37 | Mar 17, 2018 | Madison Square Garden Theater, New York City, New York, U.S. | |
| 23 | Win | 23–0 | Oliver Flores | UD | 10 | Feb 3, 2017 | Roberto Clemente Coliseum, San Juan, Puerto Rico | Retained WBO Latino lightweight title |
| 22 | Win | 22–0 | Juan José Martínez | TKO | 5 (10), 2:40 | Jun 11, 2016 | Madison Square Garden Theater, New York City, New York, U.S. | Retained WBO Latino lightweight title |
| 21 | Win | 21–0 | José Luis Rodríguez | UD | 10 | Apr 16, 2016 | Roberto Clemente Coliseum, San Juan, Puerto Rico | Retained WBO Latino lightweight title |
| 20 | Win | 20–0 | William Silva | UD | 10 | Feb 27, 2016 | Madison Square Garden Theater, New York City, New York, U.S. | Retained WBO Latino lightweight title |
| 19 | Win | 19–0 | Josenilson Dos Santos | KO | 2 (10), 2:26 | Dec 11, 2015 | Roberto Clemente Coliseum, San Juan, Puerto Rico | Retained WBO Latino lightweight title |
| 18 | Win | 18–0 | Iván Najera | UD | 10 | Jun 13, 2015 | Madison Square Garden Theater, New York City, New York, U.S. | Retained WBO Latino lightweight title |
| 17 | Win | 17–0 | Marco Antonio López | TKO | 5 (10), 1:45 | Apr 25, 2015 | Mario Morales Coliseum, Guaynabo, Puerto Rico | Won vacant WBO Latino lightweight title |
| 16 | Win | 16–0 | Karim El Ouazghari | TKO | 4 (8), 1:27 | Dec 13, 2014 | 2300 Arena, Philadelphia, Pennsylvania, U.S. | |
| 15 | Win | 15–0 | Sergio Villanueva | KO | 3 (8), 1:57 | Oct 4, 2014 | Bahía Shriners Events Center, Orlando, Florida, U.S. | |
| 14 | Win | 14–0 | Oscar Bravo | UD | 8 | Aug 16, 2014 | Héctor Solá Bezares Coliseum, Caguas, Puerto Rico | |
| 13 | Win | 13–0 | Engelberto Valenzuela | KO | 1 (6), 1:17 | Jun 7, 2014 | Madison Square Garden, New York City, New York, U.S. | |
| 12 | Win | 12–0 | Iván Zavala | KO | 1 (6), 1:14 | Apr 19, 2014 | Bahía Shriners Events Center, Orlando, Florida, U.S. | |
| 11 | Win | 11–0 | Juan Santiago | TKO | 3 (6), 1:26 | Mar 22, 2014 | Roger Mendoza Coliseum, Caguas, Puerto Rico | |
| 10 | Win | 10–0 | Lauro Alcantar | KO | 1 (6), 0:21 | Jan 25, 2014 | Madison Square Garden Theater, New York City, New York, U.S. | |
| 9 | Win | 9–0 | Petchsamuthr Duanaaymukdahan | UD | 6 | Nov 24, 2013 | The Venetian Macao, Macau, SAR | |
| 8 | Win | 8–0 | Gary Eyer | TKO | 2 (6), 2:53 | Oct 5, 2013 | Amway Center, Orlando, Florida, U.S. | |
| 7 | Win | 7–0 | Guillermo Delgadillo | UD | 6 | Aug 10, 2013 | Sands Casino Resort, Bethlehem, Pennsylvania, U.S. | |
| 6 | Win | 6–0 | Corben Page | TKO | 4 (6), 1:48 | May 18, 2013 | Rubén Zayas Montañez Coliseum, Trujillo Alto, Puerto Rico | |
| 5 | Win | 5–0 | Steve Gutierrez | TKO | 1 (4), 1:51 | Apr 13, 2013 | Radio City Music Hall, New York City, New York, U.S. | |
| 4 | Win | 4–0 | Martin Quezada | TKO | 2 (4), 0:51 | Mar 23, 2013 | Coliseo Rubén Zayas Montañez, Trujillo Alto, Puerto Rico | |
| 3 | Win | 3–0 | José Santiago | TKO | 3 (4), 0:26 | Feb 2, 2013 | Coliseo Rubén Rodríguez, Bayamón, Puerto Rico | |
| 2 | Win | 2–0 | Tomi Archambault | KO | 1 (4), 0:21 | Jan 19, 2013 | Madison Square Garden Theater, New York City, New York, U.S. | |
| 1 | Win | 1–0 | Leonardo Chavez | UD | 4 | Dec 6, 2012 | The Mirage, Paradise, Nevada, U.S. | |

== Personal life ==
Verdejo was born in San Juan, Puerto Rico, and has two brothers and two sisters. Verdejo, the only boxer in the family, started boxing when he was nine years old.

On August 7, 2016, Verdejo was involved in a motorcycle accident while traveling from Fajardo to Carolina, Puerto Rico. At first listed in critical condition, he recuperated quickly at a local hospital. He was with a companion, who was uninjured. He suffered a head injury and small lacerations. Verdejo was released from the hospital on August 19.

=== Murder charges ===
On April 30, 2021, Verdejo was named by police as a person of interest in the disappearance of a 27-year-old pregnant woman, Keishla Rodríguez. Rodriguez's family said that she was pregnant with Verdejo's child. Her body was found on the San José Lagoon the next day. On May 2, Verdejo turned himself in to police and appeared in court via video link, pleading not guilty on May 11. It was revealed on January 31, 2022, that Verdejo would not be facing the death penalty. On July 28, 2023, and after more than 25 hours of deliberation, a jury found Verdejo guilty in the kidnapping and killing of his pregnant mistress, as well as the killing of an unborn child. The jury could not reach unanimous verdicts on the other two charges against Verdejo, which included carjacking resulting in the death of a person, as well as possession and use of a firearm while committing a violent act. On November 3, 2023, Verdejo was sentenced to life in prison.

Sporting positions
Regional boxing titles
| Vacant Title last held by Jose A Gonzalez | WBO Latino lightweight champion April 25, 2015 – June 2017; Vacated | Vacant Title next held by Antonio Moran |
