= Richard Commey =

Ghanaian boxer

Personal information
- Nationality: Ghanaian
- Born: Richard Oblitey Commey; 10 March 1987 (age 39) Accra, Ghana
- Height: 5 ft 8 in (173 cm)
- Weight: Lightweight

Boxing career
- Reach: 71 in (180 cm)
- Stance: Orthodox

Boxing record
- Total fights: 36
- Wins: 30
- Win by KO: 27
- Losses: 5
- Draws: 1

Richard Oblitey Commey (born 10 March 1987) is a Ghanaian professional boxer who held the IBF lightweight title in 2019. He previously held multiple regional lightweight titles including; the Ghanaian title in 2011; the ABU title in 2013; and the Commonwealth title from 2014 to 2015.

== Professional career ==
On 9 September 2016, Commey fought for a world title for the first time in his career, against undefeated Robert Easter Jr. Both fighters had a strong start in the first four rounds. Commey managed to drop Easter Jr. in the eighth round, but it wouldn't be enough for the judges, two of them scoring the fight 115–112 and 114–113 in favor of Easter Jr., while the third judge scored the fight 114–113 for Commey, handing Easter Jr. the split-decision win.

After losing to Robert Easter Jr. for the vacant IBF lightweight title in 2016, Commey defeated Isa Chaniev in 2019 to capture the IBF title in his second attempt.

In his next fight, Commey made his first title defence, against former champion Ray Beltrán. The title however, was on the line for Beltran, since he failed to make the required weight limit for the fight. Commey dropped Beltrán four times during the fight, the last knockdown being the decisive one, since it prompted referee Eddie Hernandez Sr to stop the fight.

Next up, Commey squared off against undefeated 22-year old prospect Teófimo López on 14 December 2019, who was ranked #1 lightweight by the IBF. During the middle of the second round, both fighters tried to connect on a right hand, but López was the one who got to his target first, catching Commey with a vicious right hand which sent him down on the floor. Commey managed to beat the count, however, López immediately went in attack mode, forcing the referee to stop the fight.

On 13 February 2021, Commey rebounded from his defeat against López with a sixth-round knockout victory against Jackson Marinez.

On 11 December 2021, Commey faced recently deposed former champion Vasiliy Lomachenko from Ukraine in an almost one-sided fight. Lomachenko dominated the fight from round one to round twelve. In round 7 Commey was knocked down and visibly shaken, causing Lomachenko to tell Commey's corner to stop the fight because of the obvious damages done to the Ghanaian fighter. After some ringside verification at the start of round 8, Commey continued, and Lomachenko won nearly all the remaining rounds. Lomachenko defeated Commey in a unanimous decision.

== Professional boxing record ==
36 fights	30 wins	5 losses
By knockout	27	2
By decision	3	3
Draws	1	

No.	Result	Record	Opponent	Type	Round, time	Date	Location	Notes
36	Loss	30–5–1	José Ramírez	KO	11 (12), 2:34	26 Mar 2023	Save Mart Center, Fresno, California, US	
35	Draw	30–4–1	José Pedraza	SD	10	27 Aug 2022	Hard Rock Hotel & Casino, Tulsa, Oklahoma, US	
34	Loss	30–4	Vasiliy Lomachenko	UD	12	11 Dec 2021	Madison Square Garden, New York City, New York, US	For vacant WBO Inter-Continental lightweight title
33	Win	30–3	Jackson Maríñez	KO	6 (10), 2:35	13 Feb 2021	MGM Grand Conference Center, Paradise, Nevada, US	
32	Loss	29–3	Teófimo López	TKO	2 (12), 1:13	14 Dec 2019	Madison Square Garden, New York City, New York, US	Lost IBF lightweight title
31	Win	29–2	Ray Beltrán	KO	8 (12), 0:54	28 Jun 2019	Pechanga Resort & Casino, Temecula, California, US	Retained IBF lightweight title
30	Win	28–2	Isa Chaniev	TKO	2 (12), 0:39	2 Feb 2019	Ford Center at The Star, Frisco, Texas, US	Won vacant IBF lightweight title
29	Win	27–2	Yardley Armenta Cruz	TKO	2 (8), 0:29	4 Aug 2018	Nassau Coliseum, Uniondale, New York, US	
28	Win	26–2	Alejandro Luna	TKO	6 (12), 1:54	10 Mar 2018	Freeman Coliseum, San Antonio, Texas, US	
27	Win	25–2	Hedi Slimani	UD	12	11 Mar 2017	Bukom Boxing Arena, Accra, Ghana	Won vacant WBC International Silver lightweight title
26	Loss	24–2	Denis Shafikov	SD	12	2 Dec 2016	Tough Fight Gym, Moscow, Russia	
25	Loss	24–1	Robert Easter Jr.	SD	12	9 Sep 2016	Santander Arena, Reading, Pennsylvania, US	For vacant IBF lightweight title
24	Win	24–0	Anzor Gamgebeli	TKO	2 (8), 2:02	19 Mar 2016	MusikTeatret, Albertslund, Denmark	
23	Win	23–0	Kakha Avetisiani	TKO	5 (10), 1:17	17 Oct 2015	Dm-Arena, Karlsruhe, Germany	
22	Win	22–0	Bahodir Mamadjonov	TKO	8 (10), 1:48	22 May 2015	The D Hotel & Casino, Paradise, Nevada, US	Won vacant IBF Inter-Continental lightweight title
21	Win	21–0	Thompson Mokwana	TKO	7 (12), 0:29	14 Mar 2015	Emperors Palace, Kempton Park, South Africa	Retained Commonwealth lightweight title
20	Win	20–0	Mikheil Avakian	TKO	4 (8), 1:49	7 Feb 2015	Arena Nord, Frederikshavn, Denmark	
19	Win	19–0	Samir Ziani	UD	10	13 Dec 2014	MusikTeatret, Albertslund, Denmark	
18	Win	18–0	Gary Buckland	UD	12	12 Jul 2014	York Hall, London, England	Won vacant Commonwealth lightweight title
17	Win	17–0	Prince Ofotsu	TKO	8 (12), 0:10	26 Dec 2013	Sports Stadium, Accra, Ghana	Won vacant African lightweight title
16	Win	16–0	Paul Truscott	TKO	8 (12), 1:28	13 Jul 2013	York Hall, London, England	
15	Win	15–0	Bilal Mohammad	KO	7 (12), 1:37	8 Mar 2013	City Engineers Yard, Accra, Ghana	Won IBF Continental Africa lightweight title
14	Win	14–0	Fuseini Ahmed	TKO	7 (8), 2:12	8 Dec 2012	Will Power Boxing Complex, Accra, Ghana	
13	Win	13–0	Kris Hughes	RTD	4 (8), 3:00	15 Sep 2012	York Hall, London, England	
12	Win	12–0	Simas Volosinas	TKO	3 (6), 1:55	7 Jul 2012	York Hall, London, England	
11	Win	11–0	Korley Collison	TKO	6 (12), 2:13	16 Dec 2011	Cantonments, Accra, Ghana	Won Ghanaian lightweight title
10	Win	10–0	Yusif Salifu	TKO	3 (8), 1:27	2 Dec 2011	Cantonments, Accra, Ghana	
9	Win	9–0	Zakaria Salifu	TKO	4 (8), 1:23	4 Nov 2011	Prison's Canteen, Accra, Ghana	
8	Win	8–0	Tetteh Lamptey	TKO	3 (8), 2:42	21 Oct 2011	Prison's Canteen, Accra, Ghana	
7	Win	7–0	Emmanuel Odoi	KO	2 (8)	10 Sep 2011	Accra, Ghana	
6	Win	6–0	Dan Quartey	KO	2 (8), 2:43	30 Jul 2011	Lebanon House, Accra, Ghana	
5	Win	5–0	Zakaria Salifu	TKO	3 (8), 1:24	24 Jun 2011	Prison's Canteen, Accra, Ghana	
4	Win	4–0	Yaw Sakiya	TKO	3 (8), 2:52	21 May 2011	Lebanon House, Accra, Ghana	
3	Win	3–0	Kuma Doe	KO	3 (8)	29 Apr 2011	Prison's Canteen, Accra, Ghana	
2	Win	2–0	Obile Issaka	TKO	1 (6), 2:45	2 Apr 2011	Prison's Canteen, Accra, Ghana	
1	Win	1–0	Baba Nsor	TKO	2 (6), 0:59	26 Feb 2011	Prison's Canteen, Accra, Ghana	
