= Teofimo Lopez =

American boxer (born 1997)

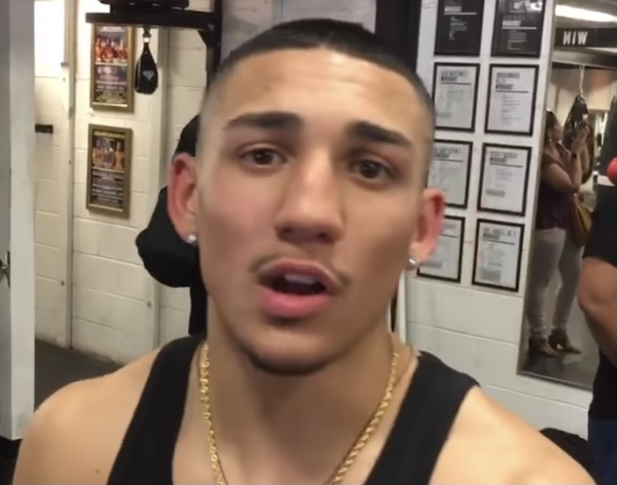
- Lopez in 2019

Personal information
- Nickname: The Takeover
- Born: Teófimo Andrés López Rivera; July 30, 1997 (age 29) Brooklyn, New York, U.S.
- Height: 5 ft 8 in (173 cm)
- Weight: Lightweight; Light welterweight; Welterweight

Boxing career
- Reach: 68 1/2 in (174 cm)
- Stance: Orthodox

Boxing record
- Total fights: 25
- Wins: 23
- Win by KO: 13
- Losses: 2
Medal record
Men's amateur boxing
Golden Gloves
Gold medal – first place	2015 Las Vegas	Lightweight
U.S. Youth National Championships
Bronze medal – third place	2013 Reno	Lightweight

Teófimo Andrés López Rivera (born July 30, 1997) is an American-Honduran professional boxer. He has held multiple world championships in three weight classes including the World Boxing Association (WBA) (Super version) welterweight title since August 2026.

As an amateur, Lopez represented Honduras at the 2016 Summer Olympics.

== Early life ==
Lopez was born to Honduran immigrants on July 30, 1997, in Brooklyn, New York. His paternal grandfather, a Spaniard from Ávila who was born in 1916, emigrated shortly after the Second World War, going to Brazil first before settling in Honduras. His father, Teofimo Lopez Sr. left Honduras with his mother at age 5, settling in Brooklyn. The family eventually relocated to Florida, where Lopez Sr. first started training his son at the age of 6.

== Amateur career ==
Lopez won the U.S. Olympic Trials but Carlos Balderas had already secured the United States' sole lightweight entry into the tournament as AIBA's World Series of Boxing champion, so Lopez was aware entering the trials that at best he could only qualify as an alternate for Balderas (who lost in the Olympic quarterfinals). Lopez was able to qualify for the Honduran team, where his parents are from, and reached the finals of the Olympic qualifying tournament for the Americas to earn his place in Rio. Lopez also won the 2015 National Golden Gloves. He competed in the men's lightweight event at the 2016 Summer Olympics representing Honduras, where he was defeated by the eventual silver medalist Sofiane Oumiha.

== Professional career ==
=== Early career ===
Lopez signed with Top Rank in October 2016, and made his debut on the undercard of the Manny Pacquiao vs. Jessie Vargas fight in November of the same year. After compiling a perfect 10–0 record, he announced himself to the world stage in December 2018 by beating veteran Mason Menard with a knockout of the year candidate.

In his next fight, Lopez, already ranked #9 by the WBA, #11 by the WBC and #10 by the WBO, faced another boxing veteran in Diego Magdaleno, which ended in another brutal knockout win for Lopez. He attracted some controversy after his exuberant celebration with Magdaleno still down on the canvas.

Lopez's winning streak continued, improving to 13–0 with a fifth-round knockout victory against former world title challenger Edis Tatli on April 20, 2019, on the undercard of Terence Crawford vs. Amir Khan at Madison Square Garden, New York City.

=== IBF lightweight champion ===
==== Lopez vs. Nakatani ====
On July 19, 2019, Lopez who was ranked #4 by the IBF at the time, faced undefeated Masayoshi Nakatani, who was ranked #3, in a final eliminator for the IBF world lightweight title. In the fourth round, Lopez knocked Nakatani down with his right hand, but the referee ruled it a slip. The fight marked the first time Lopez had gone 12 rounds in his career, and he was awarded a unanimous decision victory with scores of 118–110, 118–110, 119–109, setting up a clash with IBF champion Richard Commey.

==== Lopez vs. Commey ====
On December 14, 2019, Lopez challenged the IBF lightweight champion Richard Commey. Lopez won the IBF title in spectacular fashion after connecting on Commey with a big right hand, and finishing him with a second-round technical knockout. After the conclusion of the fight, Lopez was joined in the ring by fellow lightweight champion Vasiliy Lomachenko, with whom he took a photo with. When asked about his plans for his next fight and a possible unification bout with Lomachenko, Lopez replied, "You guys know who I want," referring to Lomachenko without explicitly naming him.

=== Unified and The Ring lightweight champion ===
==== Lopez vs. Lomachenko ====
In September 2020, Lopez agreed to fight unified WBA (Super), WBO, WBC (Franchise) and The Ring champion, Vasiliy Lomachenko, on October 17 at the MGM Grand in Las Vegas. It was the first major fight since the outbreak of the COVID-19 pandemic. With no live audience, Lopez defied the odds with a stunning upset victory as he beat the highly regarded Ukrainian by unanimous decision to unify the lightweight division and maintain his unbeaten record, with the judges' scorecards reading 116–112, 117–111 and 119–109. The first seven rounds saw Lopez staying behind his jab and going to the body, with his opponent offering very little in response. In the second half, Lomachenko started coming out more offensively, landing more punches. However, in the final round, Lopez landed 50 of 98 punches thrown (51%), the most an opponent has landed on Lomachenko in a round. According to CompuBox stats, Lomachenko landed 141 of 321 thrown (44%), while Lopez landed 183 of 659 thrown (28%).

Lopez declined to give Lomachenko a rematch, explaining that “everybody [in Lomachenko’s camp] was being a dick to me, my father. He [Lomachenko] didn’t want to put a rematch clause in our contract." In the wake of his victory, Lopez asserted that he is the undisputed lightweight champion, despite not holding the traditional WBC belt. However, the claim was contested by many boxing analysts and fans, as the 'Franchise' version of the WBC title won by Lopez against Lomachenko lacks recognition from a large portion of the boxing community, including Devin Haney, recognized by others as the holder of the legitimate WBC lightweight title.

==== Lopez vs. Kambosos Jr. ====
Lopez's first defense of his unified lightweight championship had been scheduled for June 5, 2021, against undefeated contender George Kambosos Jr., before being delayed multiple times due to complications involving Lopez testing positive for COVID-19, and disputes over the venue of the fight. The fight had gone to purse bids which was won by Triller with a winning bid of over US$6 million, leading to a fallout between Lopez and Bob Arum, head promoter at Top Rank. On October 6, it transpired that the IBF had found Triller in default of its contract obligation to stage the fight, and that its rights would be awarded to the second highest bidder, Eddie Hearn's Matchroom, meaning that the fight will be shown live exclusively on the streaming service DAZN. Despite Kambosos entering the bout as a 13 to 1 pre-fight betting underdog, he knocked down the champion in the first round of the fight. Despite returning the favor by knocking down Kambosos in the tenth round, Lopez ultimately lost the bout via split decision. One judge scored the bout 114–113 to Lopez, while the other two judges scored it 115–112 and 115–111 for Kambosos Jr.

=== Light welterweight ===
==== Lopez vs. Campa, Martin ====
For Lopez's eighteenth professional fight, he moved up to the light welterweight division. In his first bout at the weight class on August 13, 2022, he successfully rebounded from his loss against Kambosos by defeating Pedro Campa via seventh-round technical knockout after a dominant performance.

Lopez would return on December 10, 2022, against European light welterweight champion Sandor Martín in his second bout at the 140 lb limit. The first round saw an aggressive start from Lopez, where Martin busted his nose during a clash of heads. Martin was able to knock Lopez down in the second round with a check right hook. The fight was competitive, resulting in a split decision after the final bell, with judges' scorecards of 97–92 and 96–93 in Lopez's favor, and 95–94 in Martin's favor. Lopez was caught on camera in the ring post-fight candidly questioning his team: "Do I still got it?"

=== WBO and The Ring light welterweight champion ===
==== Lopez vs. Taylor ====
On April 8, 2023, it was officially announced that Lopez would attempt to become a two-division world champion and challenge undefeated WBO and The Ring light welterweight champion Josh Taylor on June 10 at the Hulu Theater in New York City. He won the fight by unanimous decision, becoming a 2 division world champion. On June 12, Lopez announced his retirement from boxing.

==== Lopez vs. Ortiz ====
On February 8, 2024, in Las Vegas, Lopez defeated Jamaine Ortiz by unanimous decision and made the first successful defence of WBO light welterweight title.

==== Lopez vs. Claggett ====
Lopez made the second defense of his title against Steve Claggett at James L. Knight Center in Miami, FL on June 29, 2024. Winning on a unanimous points decision.

==== Lopez vs. Barboza Jr. ====
In December 2024, it was announced that Lopez would make the third defense of his WBO junior welterweight title against former IBF champion Subriel Matías on March 15, 2025. The fight ultimately did not materialize however, with Lopez expressing dissatisfaction with his own promoter Top Rank for attempting to make the Lopez–Matías fight: "It's a shame that Top Rank has to put me with a guy, one offer, with Subriel Matías, who has no [commercial] value." Lopez instead expressed interest in facing Jaron Ennis or Richardson Hitchins, though those fights did not materialize either, ultimately returning to the ring on Turki Alalshikh's Times Square card as part of Riyadh Season on May 2, 2025, defending his WBO and The Ring titles against WBO interim champion Arnold Barboza Jr.

Lopez comprehensively outboxed Barboza Jr., recording his fourth consecutive unanimous decision victory. The official judges' scorecards read 116–112 twice and 118–110, with Lopez landing 127 of 574 punches. Barboza couldn't keep pace, with only 71 punches landed of 426 thrown. In his post-fight interview, Lopez again expressed interest in fighting unified welterweight champion Jaron Ennis, referring to Ennis by his moniker "Boots": "I want to see Boots. I'm Dora the Explorer and I'm looking for Boots."

==== Lopez vs. Stevenson ====
Following his victory over Barboza Jr., Lopez began negotiations for a highly anticipated matchup against WBC lightweight champion Shakur Stevenson. In October 2025, Lopez and Stevenson engaged in a public exchange on social media to promote their potential bout. Stevenson wrote: "Destiny is calling. I can feel it. Four-division champion on the way." Lopez responded: "I'm putting you to sleep for all the times you put your fans to sleep with your performances! Sorry ass [expletive]. I got a new nickname for you: Mr. Sandman." Stevenson countered by saying: "You stopped zero people at 140. Now you're gone, put me to sleep? Teofimo, your time is up. I hope you enjoyed your run – four-division champion on the way." The undefeated Stevenson (24–0, 11 KOs) and Lopez had both consistently alluded in recent weeks that they were negotiating to fight each other next, with the two appearing together on "Inside The Ring" in September to promote the potential matchup. Stevenson, ranked No. 8 on The Ring's pound-for-pound list, expressed his intentions to move up in weight without a tune-up fight: "Pound-for-pound, I'm going to beat the man at 140, get the Ring Magazine belt, and laugh at all who doubted. No tune ups, no fights to get comfortable at the weight — just big balls and big dreams."

The fight was expected to be part of a Premier Boxing Champions card and backed by Turki Alalshikh. Both expressed excitement for the matchup during the Crawford-Álvarez fight in Las Vegas. Stevenson was aiming to capture a fourth division title. While the Barclays Center in Brooklyn was the likely venue for the bout, it was stated that Stevenson's camp preferred Madison Square Garden to avoid Lopez's hometown advantage. On November 5, it was reported that negotiations were advancing positively regarding the fight. A potential date was identified as January 31, which would strategically place the event between the NFL conference championship games and the Super Bowl, potentially increasing its visibility and viewership. On December 1, the fight was announced to take place on January 31 in New York, as part of "The Ring VI", exclusively on DAZN. The fight would see Lopez defending his WBO junior welterweight title. Stevenson was aiming to become a four-division champion. On December 9, Madison Square Garden was confirmed as the venue. Stevenson was a heavy -350 favourite while Lopez was entering as a +250 underdog. According to Lopez, there was no rematch clause in the contract. Lopez revealed that his training focused on adjusting his fighting style to manage range and distance effectively. He described Stevenson as “one-of-one”, a unique and formidable opponent.

=== Welterweight ===
==== Lopez vs. Romero ====
On June 23, 2026, reports stated that Lopez and two-weight world champion, the current WBA welterweight champion, Rolly Romero (17–2, 13 KOs) had verbally agreed to a fight. Romero had not fought since defeating Ryan Garcia in May 2025, when he claimed the belt. On June 27, the fight was announced to take place on August 22 in Las Vegas. Romero had previously been linked with a possible tune-up fight but instead chose a higher-profile bout with Lopez, delaying a potential mandatory defense against Jack Catterall. Lopez had also declined an IBF title opportunity against Lindolfo Delgado after Richardson Hitchins vacated the belt following his move to Zuffa Boxing. The T-Mobile Arena was later confirmed as the venue. At the launch press conference on July 9, in Los Angeles, both boxers described each other as friends and sparred together, however, they said they needed to put that aside for the important fight. Romero said he had "so much love" for Lopez and welcomed the challenge, while Lopez stated that "everything" was at stake following his loss to Stevenson. Romero's trainer Ismael Salas stated that Lopez's style was favorable for Romero, whereas Lopez's father argued that his son was difficult to beat when mentally focused. DraftKings listed Lopez as a -225 betting favorite and Romero as the +175 underdog. Lopez won the fight by majority decision with two of the ringside judges scoring it 116–112 and 115–113 respectively in his favour, while the third had it a 114–114 draw.

== Personal life ==
On April 23, 2019, Lopez married his wife Cynthia Lopez, who is originally from Nicaragua. They first met on a Delta Air Lines flight from New York City to Las Vegas shortly after Lopez's victorious 9th pro fight against Vitor Jones Freitas, on which Cynthia was a flight attendant. Shortly after marrying, they spent their honeymoon vacation in Greece. In 2025, Lopez and his wife went through the divorce process.

On June 15, 2021, Lopez tested positive for COVID-19, leading to the postponement of his fight with George Kambosos Jr.

== Professional boxing record ==
25 fights	23 wins	2 losses
By knockout	13	0
By decision	10	2

No.	Result	Record	Opponent	Type	Round, time	Date	Location	Notes
25	Win	23–2	Rolando Romero	MD	12	Aug 22, 2026	T-Mobile Arena, Las Vegas, Nevada, U.S.	Won WBA (Super) welterweight title
24	Loss	22–2	Shakur Stevenson	UD	12	Jan 31, 2026	Madison Square Garden, New York City, New York, U.S.	Lost WBO and The Ring light welterweight titles
23	Win	22–1	Arnold Barboza Jr.	UD	12	May 2, 2025	Times Square, New York City, New York, U.S.	Retained WBO and The Ring light welterweight titles
22	Win	21–1	Steve Claggett	UD	12	Jun 29, 2024	James L. Knight Center, Miami Beach, Florida, U.S.	Retained WBO and The Ring light welterweight titles
21	Win	20–1	Jamaine Ortiz	UD	12	Feb 8, 2024	Michelob Ultra Arena, Paradise, Nevada, U.S.	Retained WBO and The Ring light welterweight titles
20	Win	19–1	Josh Taylor	UD	12	Jun 10, 2023	Hulu Theater at Madison Square Garden, New York City, New York, U.S.	Won WBO and The Ring light welterweight titles
19	Win	18–1	Sandor Martín	SD	10	Dec 10, 2022	Madison Square Garden, New York City, New York, U.S.	Retained WBO International light welterweight title
18	Win	17–1	Pedro Campa	TKO	7 (10), 2:14	Aug 13, 2022	Resorts World Las Vegas, Winchester, Nevada, U.S.	Won vacant NABF and WBO International light welterweight titles
17	Loss	16–1	George Kambosos Jr.	SD	12	Nov 27, 2021	Hulu Theater at Madison Square Garden, New York City, New York, U.S.	Lost WBA (Super), IBF, WBO, and The Ring lightweight titles
16	Win	16–0	Vasiliy Lomachenko	UD	12	Oct 17, 2020	MGM Grand Conference Center, Paradise, Nevada, U.S.	Retained IBF lightweight title; Won WBA (Super), WBO, and The Ring lightweight titles
15	Win	15–0	Richard Commey	TKO	2 (12), 1:13	Dec 14, 2019	Madison Square Garden, New York City, New York, U.S.	Won IBF lightweight title
14	Win	14–0	Masayoshi Nakatani	UD	12	Jul 19, 2019	MGM National Harbor, Oxon Hill, Maryland, U.S.	
13	Win	13–0	Edis Tatli	KO	5 (12), 1:32	Apr 20, 2019	Madison Square Garden, New York City, New York, U.S.	Retained NABF lightweight title
12	Win	12–0	Diego Magdaleno	KO	7 (10), 1:08	Feb 2, 2019	The Ford Center at The Star, Frisco, Texas, U.S.	Retained NABA, NABF, and USBA lightweight titles
11	Win	11–0	Mason Menard	KO	1 (10), 0:44	Dec 8, 2018	Hulu Theater at Madison Square Garden, New York City, New York, U.S.	Won vacant NABA, NABF, and USBA lightweight titles
10	Win	10–0	William Silva	TKO	6 (10), 0:15	Jul 14, 2018	Lakefront Arena, New Orleans, Louisiana, U.S.	Won vacant WBC Continental Americas lightweight title
9	Win	9–0	Vitor Jones Freitas	KO	1 (8), 1:04	May 12, 2018	Madison Square Garden, New York City, New York, U.S.	
8	Win	8–0	Juan Pablo Sanchez	UD	6	Feb 3, 2018	American Bank Center, Corpus Christi, Texas, U.S.	
7	Win	7–0	Josh Ross	TKO	2 (6), 1:57	Oct 13, 2017	A La Carte Event Pavilion, Tampa, Florida, U.S.	
6	Win	6–0	Christian Santibanez	UD	6	Jul 7, 2017	A La Carte Event Pavilion, Tampa, Florida, U.S.	
5	Win	5–0	Ronald Rivas	KO	2 (6), 2:21	May 20, 2017	Madison Square Garden, New York City, New York, U.S.	
4	Win	4–0	Jorge Luis Munguia	TKO	2 (6), 0:48	Apr 21, 2017	Osceola Heritage Center, Kissimmee, Florida, U.S.	
3	Win	3–0	Daniel Bastien	KO	2 (6), 0:39	Mar 17, 2017	The Theater at Madison Square Garden, New York City, New York, U.S.	
2	Win	2–0	Francisco Medel	TKO	4 (4), 0:58	Feb 24, 2017	Tony Rosa Community Center, Palm Bay, Florida, U.S.	
1	Win	1–0	Ishwar Siqueiros	KO	2 (4), 2:03	Nov 5, 2016	Thomas & Mack Center, Paradise, Nevada, U.S.	

== Titles in boxing ==
=== Major world titles ===
- WBA (Super) lightweight champion (135 lbs)
- WBC Franchise lightweight champion (135 lbs)
- IBF lightweight champion (135 lbs)
- WBO lightweight champion (135 lbs)
- WBO light welterweight champion (140 lbs)
- WBA (Super) welterweight champion (147 lbs)

=== The Ring magazine titles ===
- The Ring lightweight champion (135 lbs)
- The Ring light welterweight champion (140 lbs)

=== Regional/International titles ===
- WBC Continental Americas lightweight champion (135 lbs)
- NABA lightweight champion (135 lbs)
- USBA lightweight champion (135 lbs)
- NABF lightweight champion (135 lbs)
- NABF light welterweight champion (140 lbs)
- WBO International light welterweight champion (140 lbs)

== Boxing Awards ==
- The Ring magazine Fighter of the Year: 2020 (Note: Shared with Tyson Fury.)
- Sugar Ray Robinson Award: 2020
- Sports Illustrated Fighter of the Year: 2020
- BoxingScene Fighter of the Year: 2020
- WBN Fighter of the Year: 2020

== See also ==
- List of world lightweight boxing champions
- List of world light-welterweight boxing champions

== Notes ==
Sporting positions
Amateur boxing titles
Previous: Maliek Montgomery	U.S. Golden Gloves lightweight champion 2015	Next: Maliek Montgomery
Regional boxing titles
Vacant Title last held by Ryan Martin	WBC Continental Americas lightweight champion July 14, 2018 – November 2018; Vacated	Vacant Title next held by Adrian Estrella
Vacant Title last held by Ray Beltrán	NABF lightweight champion December 8, 2018 – November 2019; Vacated	Vacant Title next held by Oscar Duarte Jurado
Vacant Title last held by Devin Haney	USBA lightweight champion December 8, 2018 – November 2019; Vacated	Vacant Title next held by Michel Rivera
Vacant Title last held by Demond Brock	NABA lightweight champion February 2, 2019 – September 2019; Vacated	Vacant Title next held by Chris Colbert
Vacant Title last held by Lee Reeves	NABF light welterweight champion August 13, 2022 – December 2022; Vacated	Vacant Title next held by Steve Claggett
Vacant Title last held by Arnold Barboza Jr.	WBO International light welterweight champion August 13, 2022 – June 10, 2023; Won world title	Vacant Title next held by Steve Claggett
World boxing titles
Preceded by Richard Commey	IBF lightweight champion December 14, 2019 – November 27, 2021	Succeeded by George Kambosos Jr.
Preceded by Vasiliy Lomachenko	WBA lightweight champion Super title October 17, 2020 – November 27, 2021	Succeeded by George Kambosos Jr.
Preceded by Vasiliy Lomachenko	WBO lightweight champion October 17, 2020 – November 27, 2021	Succeeded by George Kambosos Jr.
Preceded by Vasiliy Lomachenko	The Ring lightweight champion October 17, 2020 – November 27, 2021	Succeeded by George Kambosos Jr.
Preceded by Josh Taylor	WBO light welterweight champion June 10, 2023 – January 31, 2026	Succeeded by Shakur Stevenson
Preceded by Josh Taylor	The Ring light welterweight champion June 10, 2023 – January 31, 2026	Succeeded by Shakur Stevenson
Preceded by Rolando Romero	WBA welterweight champion Super title August 22, 2026 – present	Incumbent
Awards
Previous: Jaime Munguia	The Ring Prospect of the Year; 2018	Next: Vergil Ortiz Jr.
Previous: Canelo Álvarez	The Ring Fighter of the Year; 2020; With: Tyson Fury	Next: Canelo Álvarez
Previous: Canelo Álvarez	BWAA Fighter of the Year; 2020	Next: Canelo Álvarez
