= Lamont Roach Jr. =

American boxer (born 1995)

Personal information
- Nickname: The Reaper
- Born: August 18, 1995 (age 31) Washington, D.C., U.S.
- Height: 5 ft 7 in (170 cm)
- Weight: Super featherweight; Lightweight; Light welterweight

Boxing career
- Reach: 68 in (173 cm)
- Stance: Orthodox

Boxing record
- Total fights: 30
- Wins: 25
- Win by KO: 10
- Losses: 2
- Draws: 3
Medal record
Men's Amateur boxing
Representing United States
Golden Gloves
| Gold medal – first place | 2013 Salt Lake City | Lightweight |

Lamont Roach Jr. (born August 18, 1995) is an American professional boxer. He held the World Boxing Association (WBA) super featherweight title from 2023 to 2025.

Roach was a decorated amateur, winning gold medals at the National Golden Gloves and USA Boxing Youth National Championships in 2013. He made his professional debut the following year, shortly after signing with Golden Boy Promotions, while studying at the University of Maryland. He went undefeated in his first 20 fights (19 wins, 1 draw), collecting three minor belts before he unsuccessfully challenged Jamel Herring for his WBO super featherweight title in 2019.

== Early life ==
Born in Washington, D.C., Roach was raised in Upper Marlboro, Maryland. When he was nine years old, he accompanied his father and his cousin to No “X” Cuse Boxing Club in Capitol Heights, where he got to hit a punching bag for the first time and learn some of the basics of boxing. He enjoyed it so much that he decided to continue training under his father and his cousin Bernard, and by middle school was in the gym five times a week. Although he had also been playing football throughout his youth, he dropped it to focus on boxing once he reached high school.

As an amateur, his record was 125–15, with two of those losses coming from Gervonta Davis. He won two Junior National Golden Gloves Championships, a national PAL Championship and five Ringside World Championships. In 2013, he was the USA Boxing Youth National Champion and the National Golden Gloves champion, both at 132 pounds (60 kg). He also claimed a bronze medal at the Klitschko Brothers Tournament in Ukraine and was honored with the USA Boxing Outstanding Boxer award for his performances that year.

== Professional career ==
=== Early career ===
In March 2014, he signed with Golden Boy Promotions to begin his professional career with his father Lamont Sr. serving as his manager. Roach made his professional debut on April 19, 2014, defeating Victor Galindo by unanimous decision at the D.C. Armory. Just 18 years old at the time, he was still a freshman at the University of Maryland studying mechanical engineering, following in his father's footsteps. Two months later, he defeated Miguel Antonio Rodríguez in Boston when his opponent failed to answer the bell for the second round. In his first televised match he faced Herbert Quartey, cousin of former world champion Ike Quartey, in Philadelphia on January 20, 2015. Roach dominated the more experienced fighter, scoring three knockdowns before the fight was stopped in his favor by the referee in the fourth round, extending his winning streak to six.

=== Super featherweight ===
On January 28, 2017, he stopped Alejandro Valdez inside of two minutes in Indio, California to capture the vacant WBC Youth Silver super featherweight title and move to 13–0. He dedicated the win to his recently deceased cousin Jermaine, who had accompanied him to his first boxing session more than a decade earlier. He successfully defended the belt against Jesús Valdez five months later, also in Indio. Just days before his next fight, a non-title bout versus Dominican veteran Luis Hinojosa in October, his cousin and life-long trainer Bernard "Boogaloo" Roach died of a heart attack. With his father taking over as his head coach, he went on to beat Hinojosa with a first-round TKO for his third stoppage victory in four fights. A month later Roach headlined his first professional card when he faced Rey Perez at the MGM National Harbor in Maryland, just 20 minutes from his hometown of Upper Marlboro. He defeated the Filipino journeyman by unanimous decision in the 10-round main event of the ESPN Deportes/ESPN2 telecast.

By the beginning of 2018 Roach had a record of 16–0. He was rewarded with an opportunity to challenge for the vacant WBO International super featherweight title, traveling to Puerto Rico to face former world title challenger Orlando Cruz. In what was his first fight outside of the continental United States, he fought Cruz to a controversial split draw in the main event of a Golden Boy Boxing on ESPN card. It was a close fight until the ninth round, when Roach hit the 36-year-old with a left hook to the head that made him stagger and fall, seemingly a knockdown. However, it was ruled a slip by Puerto Rican referee Luis Pabon, a crucial point that would have given him the victory. Three months later he defeated Deivis Julio Bassa for the still-vacant WBO International belt in Cancún, after the Colombian contender stayed in his corner at the conclusion of the sixth round. The victory catapulted him to No. 5 in the WBO rankings. On December 15, he defeated Alberto Mercado in his first title defense by unanimous decision on the undercard of the Canelo Álvarez–Rocky Fielding world title bout at Madison Square Garden. This further moved him up the WBO rankings to No. 2 in January 2019.

Roach faced veteran Puerto Rican fighter Jonathan Oquendo in a WBO junior lightweight final eliminator during the Álvarez–Daniel Jacobs undercard at T-Mobile Arena in May 2019. He retained his belt while also taking Oquendo's WBO–NABO belt with a unanimous decision victory.

==== Roach vs. Herring ====
On June 21, 2019, the WBO mandated Jamel Herring (20–2, 10 KOs), the recently crowned WBO super lightweight champion to make his first defence against Roach. The teams were given 30 day negotiation period before purse bids would be called. Herring won the title a month earlier dethroning Masayuki Ito via decision. On September 9, ESPN reported the fight was set to take place on Veterans Day weekend on November 9, at the Chukchansi Park in Fresno, California. The card aired on ESPN+. The two where known to each other having sparred in recent years. Herring did not disclose anything about the sessions, but believed he had the edge based on the time shared. Roach praised Herring for his accomplishments and was happy the location picked for the fight was neutral. He said, “He’s a tough and crafty fighter. He deserves to be a champion as he won his championship but his time is ticking. On November 9th - I will be champion soon.” Herring weighed 129.8 pounds and Roach was 129 pounds, in what was his first world title fight.

Roach was defeated in his quest to become world champion via unanimous decision. Herring, who had a height and reach advantage, used his range and jab, while Roach, who was shorter, had to rely on landing hooks and counters whilst fighting on the inside. Herring forced Roach into uncomfortable positions, having controlled the early and mid rounds. Roach did find success in the later rounds, notably landing a right hand in the eleventh round. The scorecards read 117–111 (twice) and 115–113 in favor of Herring, who retained his belt. Herring dedicated the win to the US Troops. According to CompuBox, Herring connected 143 of 665 punches (22%) and Roach landed with 84 of 403 (21%). Herring earned $300,000 for his defence and Roach took a $100,000 fight purse. This was Roach's first 12-round fight a professional. He felt the scorecard were sightly wide, but stated he would return stronger. Roach said he wished he’d pushed harder earlier in the fight. Missing that chance left him frustrated. His trainer, Joel Diaz, wasn’t happy and called Roach out for playing it too safe.

In December 2025, Roach looked back on the fight and called it a turning point. He admitted he hadn’t given Herring enough credit, and losing taught him a lot. The loss changed how he approached the rest of his career.

He was scheduled to face Neil John Tabanao (17–7, 11 KOs) at the Avalon Hollywood on March 19, 2020, but the fight was cancelled due to the COVID-19 pandemic.

==== Back to winning ways ====
The fight with Tabanao was rescheduled to take place on October 30, on the Jaime Munguia vs. Tureano Johnson undercard. During the build-up, Tabanao stated he contacted coronavirus, which affected his training and preparation. Roach was a heavy favorite going into the fight. Roach dominated and won the fight by a third-round knockout.

Roach next fought Daniel Rosas (22–4–1, 14 KOs) on July 9, 2021 on the undercard for the Gilberto Ramírez vs. Sullivan Barrera at the Banc of California Stadium in Los Angeles, California. From the opening bell, Roach pushed forward, not allowing Rosas to settle. In the second round, he landed a sharp left hook to Rosas’ head, followed by a right hand to his body. Rosas hit the canvas. Referee Jerry Cantu stopped the fight at 2:14 of round two. After the fight, Roach called for a fight against the winner of Roger Gutiérrez vs. René Alvarado, which was a rematch for the WBA junior lightweight title.

==== Roach vs. Alvarado ====
On November 11, 2021, Golden Boy Promotions announced a card to take place at the AT&T Center in San Antonio, Texas, on December 18, headlined by Gilberto Ramírez and Yunieski Gonzalez. The card was streamed live globally on DAZN. Announced for the undercard was Roach against René Alvarado (32–10, 21 KOs) in a 10-round bout for the vacant NABA title. Having met in 2015, Roach explained that Alvarado had been on his radar ever since. He admired Alvarado's toughness and his reputation for fighting high-level opponents. Using his counterpunching and accuracy, Roach was able to defeat Alvarado via unanimous decision. Alvarado pushed forward, trying to dominate the entire fight. He threw over 1,000 punches, landing only 99 of them (10%). Roach was able to effectively counter his aggressive attacks, which was a major factor in his victory. Roach also landed 99 punches but threw 597 (17%). Two judges scored the fight 98–92 for Roach, while the third judge awarded him a 100–90 scorecard. Roach showed that he could control the pace and range against a more aggressive opponent.

==== Roach vs. Rodriguez ====
Roach's next fight was announced on June 23, 2022 to take place at Crypto.com Arena in Los Angeles, on the Ryan Garcia vs. Javier Fortuna undercard. The card was scheduled for July 16, on DAZN. Roach was set to fight in a 12-round WBA super featherweight title eliminator against 34 year old Angel Rodriguez (20–1, 10 KOs). On the press release, Roach said, “Just in case the division forgot about me I'm putting them on notice on July 16. This is my opportunity to get closer to a world title shot and I am going to win and put on an impressive performance.” Roach weighed in at 129.8 pounds, while Rodriguez, who was on a 12-fight win streak, was 129.2 pounds. Roach moved another step closer to another world title shot, defeating Rodriguez via unanimous decision, outboxing him for the majority of the twelve rounds. In the fourth round, Roach went down after being hit accidentally below the belt following a right hand. He recovered from this and continued boxing. In the next round, he landed a strong counter right that rocked Rodriguez, with just over a minute remaining. Rodriguez was visibly affected by this shot but managed to see out the remainder of the fifth. The only other noticeable moment came in the eleventh round when Roach landed another right hand that caused Rodriguez to back away. The judges' scorecards read 117–111, 116–112, and 116–112. According to CompuBox, Roach landed 99 of 651 punches thrown (15%), and Rodriguez landed 62 of 547 (11%). Seventy-two of Roach's shots landed were power punches. Golden Boy Promotions did not renew Roach's contract after this bout, allowing him to become promotional free.

==== Roach vs. Garcia ====
On March 20, 2023, the WBA ordered Héctor García (16–1, 10 KOs; 3 NC) to enter negotiations to defend his world title against Roach before May 20. García won the title in August 2022 against Roger Gutiérrez, and was granted by the WBA to take a voluntary fight, as long as he fought his mandatory within 9 months. In this time, García moved up to lightweight in a losing attempt against Gervonta Davis in January 2023. On April 14, British promoter Eddie Hearn said he was interested in approaching Roach to defend his world title against Zelfa Barrett (31–2, 17 KOs) following Barrett’s impressive victory over Jordan Gill. The fight was never scheduled and Barrett believed all the world champions were avoiding him. Purse bids were scheduled for May 25, which was won by TGB Promotions on behalf of Premier Boxing Champions, which meant the fight was likely to be broadcast on Showtime. The winning bid was $410,000. The only other bidder was NoXcuse Boxing, led by Roach’s father Lamont Roach Sr., with a bid of $351,000. A per WBA purse splits, García was entitled to 75%, which equated to $307,500, with Roach taking the remaining $102,500 purse.

Speaking ahead of the fight, Roach said, “I wanna make him quit. Even if I don’t sleep him, I wanna make him quit. I want him to be like ‘alright, I don’t wanna to do this anymore.” This was a reference to García's fight against Davis, in which he quit on his stool after eight rounds. On November 1, it was announced that the fight would take place on the David Benavidez–Demetrius Andrade undercard November 25, 2023 at the Michelob ULTRA Arena in Las Vegas. García was happy to be fighting back at his natural weight, stating he had a good training camp. He also acknowledged Roach as a tough opponent. García was a 4-1 favorite heading into the fight. The weigh in took place behind closed doors. García was 129.4 pounds and Roach came in at 129.6 pounds.

In a closely contested, technical fight, Roach won via split decision, becoming the new WBA champion. The fight started off slow with García landing effective counters. Roach gained momentum in the later rounds, hurting García in the eleventh and dropping him in the final round with a left hook, with only 1:20 left of the round. One judges scored the bout 114–113 for García, but was overruled by the remaining judges who scored it 116–111, 114–113 for Roach. Roach landed 118 of 490 punches thrown (29%) with 79 power shots and García landed 93 of 468 (20%), landing 62 power shots. Following the win, Roach said, “Man, I’ve been waiting to hear ‘And the new’ for a long time. It’s about time though. All I needed was the spotlight. The first time I was a baby – I was 24 years old. Now I’m seasoned. I don’t think anyone can beat me. Nobody.” Roach offered an open challenge to the other champions at the weight for a unification. García and his team were not happy with the outcome due to the controversial knockdown, claiming it was an illegal punch. His trainer Bob Santos was hoping the WBA would call for an immediate rematch. A rematch was not ordered and the fight ended up being García's last as he retired in 2025.

==== Roach vs. McCrory ====
On May 6, 2024, ProBox TV announced that Roach would make his first defence of his WBA title on June 28, taking place at his hometown Washington D.C., against Northern Irishman Feargal McCrory (16–0, 8 KOs). The event was promoted by NoXcuse Promotions, run by Roach's father. Roach was excited to be the first fighter from his hometown since Lamont Peterson, to defend a world title. He was said to be training as if it was a unification bout. The fight took place at the Entertainment and Sports Arena. Roach spoke about his cousin Bernard “Boogaloo” Roach, paying tribute to him as the reason he and his father entered boxing. Roach saw his career as continuing his cousins legacy. It was Roach's first bout in Washington D.C. since 2017. Speaking ahead of the fight, McCrory said he was fully focused and had a good training camp. He requested that the officials are fair and did not think anything of being the 'away fighter'. Roach weighed in at the 130 pound limit, while McCrory weighed in at 129.6 pounds.

Roach dropped McCrory three times, stopping him in the eighth round. Roach dominated the fight. The first knockdown was from a left hook in the third round and the other two both came from body shots in the fourth round. The fight was stopped by McCrory's trainer Colin Morgan due to the ongoing punishment. Despite being dropped, McCrory showed good resilience, fighting back in the middle rounds. Pleased with his performance, Roach said, “I’ve been training my ass off to put on a spectacular performance.” He wanted to take unifications next. Roach landed 150 of 581 punches thrown (26%) and McCrory landed 62 of 422 (15%). During the post-fight press conference, Roach rated McCrory’s toughness as “1001 out of 10,” noting his resilience. He described McCrory’s physicality, in particular his “big head,” and his ability to absorb punishment without giving up. McCrory admitted Roach was the better fighter on the night. Though disappointed, he respected his trainers decision to stop the fight, knowing the importance of his responsibility.

=== Lightweight ===
==== Roach vs. Davis ====
On September 30, 2024 it was announced that Roach, who at that time was also a WBA super featherweight champion, was granted special permission by the WBA to move up a weight class and challenge Gervonta Davis for his WBA lightweight title on December 14, 2024. On October 6, 2024 the fight was confirmed to take place at Toyota Center in Houston, TX on December 14, 2024. Late October 2024, it was reported that the fight was postponed. On November 13, 2024 it was reported that the fight was targeted for March 1, 2025. On November 29, 2024, the bout between Roach and Davis has been confirmed to be held on March 1, 2025 at Barclays Center in Brooklyn, New York.

Davis would retain his WBA lightweight title in a majority draw (115–113 Davis, 114–114, and 114–114), the first of his professional career. The decision was met with significant controversy, particularly due to a moment in the 9th round in which Davis suddenly took a knee following a quick jab from Roach. Davis then walked to his corner, motioned toward his left eye, and was wiped with a towel. Referee Steve Willis incorrectly did not call it a knockdown against Davis. Had the knockdown been correctly called, Roach would have won via split decision and resulted in the first loss of Davis' career. Nevertheless, Roach was only the third fighter to go the distance with Davis, after Germán Meraz and Isaac Cruz. In the post-fight interview, Davis stated "I just got my hair done two days ago, and she put grease in it. [...] When you're sweating and things like that, the grease came into my face and burned my eyes." He then later expressed interest in rematching Roach. On March 4, 2025, it was reported that Roach's camp filed an appeal to the NYSAC to overturn the draw. 3 days later, the NYSAC stated that although Roach should have been credited with a knockdown against Davis, they opted not to overturn the result, claiming that "the referee's call was not outcome-determinative".

According to Dan Rafael, the PPV generated around 262,000 buys, grossing $21 million in revenue. The attendance was reported to be a record 19,250 for the Barclays Center. It was later reported the event sold 16,420 tickets with 766 comps, generating a $6,415,815 gate. The attendance was 2,064 lower than what was originally announced by PBC.

On April 3, ESPN reported a rematch was being planned for June 21 between Davis and Roach with T-Mobile Arena being the potential venue. Sources claimed the fight would instead take place at the end of Summer. In May, Brunch Boxing's Matthew “Bellini” Brown revealed the fight would take place on August 16 in Las Vegas. On June 20, Roach put out a tweet claiming Davis was yet to sign his end of the deal. After Davis was arrested for battery on July 11, the prospect of a rematch with Roach appeared increasingly doubtful. On August 16, Roach stated he would no longer pursue the rematch with Davis and felt Davis was never keen to give him a rematch. Four days later, Davis announced an exhibition fight with Jake Paul in November 2025. The WBA was expected to review Davis' championship status because of the failure to schedule the required rematch.

=== Super lightweight ===
==== Roach vs. Cruz ====
On October 3, 2025, Premier Boxing Champions announced that Isaac “Pitbull” Cruz (28–3–1, 18 KOs) would defend his interim WBC super lightweight title against Roach on December 6, to be broadcast on Prime Video PPV from the Frost Bank Center in San Antonio, Texas. The fight was originally planned a month prior. In a press release, Sean Gibbons stated, “We hoped for Gervonta, but this is a better fight against the guy in Lamont Roach who the fans and everyone but the New York State Boxing Commission believe beat Gervonta Davis. We know Roach wants to bang, and Cruz only knows one way to fight. You want fights where you know the fans will be fine spending their money for it, and this is absolutely a fight you’d be happy to pay for … San Antonio is getting a serious gift from boxing for Christmas.” Cruz sought to reinforce his position as a prominent figure in Mexican boxing, particularly in light of Canelo Álvarez's recent loss. Roach was favored to win the fight, being listed as a 2-to-1 favorite by DraftKings. He recognized Cruz's strengths but was confident that his adaptable fighting style would effectively counter Cruz's persistent pressure and power, and he intended to "dominate" the fight. The WBA stated they would allow Roach to enter the ring as the WBA super featherweight champion, he would however be stripped immediately after the opening bell, elevating James 'Jazza' Dickens to full championship status.

On the night, with an announced crowd of 10,230, despite appearing to dominate significant portions of the fight, Roach settled with a contentious majority draw against Cruz, which saw Cruz retain his interim title. This marked the second disputed majority draw of Roach’s 2025. Cruz start aggressively, using his face-first, high-pressure style to apply early pressure on Roach. In the third round, Cruz scored a pivotal knockdown with a left hook that caused Roach’s glove to touch the canvas, giving Cruz an early lead. Roach mounted a strong comeback, especially from the sixth round onward, effectively using jabs and counter shots to control the action, while Cruz shifted to a more outside, box-oriented style. Cruz was penalized a point in the seventh for frequent clinching and hitting to the hip. In the later rounds, Roach’s adjustments and accuracy earned him considerable success. He out landed Cruz in total punches, including power shots, and controlled the fight in majority of those rounds. One judge scored it 115–111 in favor of Cruz, while the other two judges scored it 113–113, resulting in a majority draw.

During the post-fight, Roach expressed deep frustration with the decision, feeling he had earned a clear victory. He stated, “All I want is a fair shake. It’s some bulls**. I don’t know what I got to do. I’m tired of this.” Cruz defended his performance but acknowledged the referee’s point deduction influenced the draw. He stated he was willing to engage in a rematch under the condition of a different referee, “Absolutely [we can rematch]. With a different referee, though. Without the referee being on his side.” CompuBox showed that Roach landed 191 of 467 punches thrown (41%) and Cruz landed 159 of 544 (29%). It was later confirmed that Roach had sustained a broken hand in the fifth round, which meant he fought for half of the bout using only one hand. Roach was seeking a rematch, to take place in Washington D.C. whereas at the same time, Cruz stated that he wanted to move on and fight more aggressively approaching boxers. and believed he gave a good account for himself.

=== Return to lightweight ===
==== Roach vs. Zepeda ====
In March 2026, the WBC ordered Roach and William Zepeda (33–1, 27 KOs) to fight for the vacant lightweight title. The title was made vacant when the WBC stripped former champion Shakur Stevenson, who moved up in weight, defeating Teofimo Lopez, however failed to pay them a sanctioning fee. Zepeda, who was coming off a loss to Stevenson was automatically bumped up to #1 position. One thing that was unusual in this was that interim champion Jadier Herrera was not elevated to full championship status, nor was he given the immediate opportunity to fight for the full champion. Instead the WBC explained that he would fight the winner of Roach and Zepeda. On May 30, Chris Mannix confirmed the fight would take place on August 1 in Las Vegas. The card would also feature a bout between IBF champion Raymond Muratalla and Robson Conceição, and the winners of their respected fights, likely to unify later in the year. On June 4, the fight was announced for the vacant WBC title, to take place at The Theater at Virgin Hotels in Las Vegas. The bout was scheduled to be broadcast in the United States on TNT and truTV, with global distribution on DAZN.

Zepeda defeated Roach via unanimous decision, putting on a performance based on relentless pressure to capture the vacant WBC title. Zepeda overwhelmed Roach with an incredible work rate. Roach had success early with counters and check hooks. From the third round, Zepeda began to break down Roach by cutting off the ring, using heavy combinations and body shots, which effectively slowed down Roach's movement. The three judges scored the bout 118–110, 117–111, and 117–111 in Zepeda's favour. In the aftermath, Roach offered no excuses, admitted that his timing was off and he had underestimated Zepeda's depth. He said, "Coming into the fight we just thought he was a one-trick pony. He actually used his feet, as you can see." Zepeda also admitted that he fought in 'survival mode' by loading up on single big shots, rather than letting his hands go. According to CompuBox, Zepeda landed 218 of 884 punches thrown (24.6%) and Roach landed 153 of his 591 thrown (25.7%). 60 of Zepeda's landed power punches were body shots. The 218 landed punches by Zepeda were the most ever recorded against Roach by an opponent.

== Professional boxing record ==
| 30 fights | 25 wins | 2 losses |
|---|---|---|
| By knockout | 10 | 0 |
| By decision | 15 | 2 |
| Draws | 3 | |

| No. | Result | Record | Opponent | Type | Round, time | Date | Location | Notes |
|---|---|---|---|---|---|---|---|---|
| 30 | Loss | 25–2–3 | William Zepeda | UD | 12 | Aug 1, 2026 | The Theater at Virgin Hotels, Las Vegas, Nevada, U.S | For vacant WBC lightweight title |
| 29 | Draw | 25–1–3 | Isaac Cruz | MD | 12 | Dec 6, 2025 | Frost Bank Center, San Antonio, Texas, U.S | For WBC interim super lightweight title |
| 28 | Draw | 25–1–2 | Gervonta Davis | MD | 12 | Mar 1, 2025 | Barclays Center, Brooklyn, New York, U.S. | For WBA lightweight title |
| 27 | Win | 25–1–1 | Feargal McCrory | TKO | 8 (12), 2:45 | Jun 28, 2024 | Entertainment and Sports Arena, Washington, D.C., U.S. | Retained WBA super featherweight title |
| 26 | Win | 24–1–1 | Héctor García | SD | 12 | Nov 25, 2023 | Michelob Ultra Arena, Paradise, Nevada, U.S. | Won WBA super featherweight title |
| 25 | Win | 23–1–1 | Angel Rodriguez | UD | 12 | Jul 16, 2022 | Crypto.com Arena, Los Angeles, California, U.S. | |
| 24 | Win | 22–1–1 | René Alvarado | UD | 10 | Dec 18, 2021 | AT&T Center, San Antonio, Texas, U.S. | Won WBA-NABA super featherweight title |
| 23 | Win | 21–1–1 | Daniel Rosas | TKO | 2 (10), 2:55 | Jul 9, 2021 | Banc of California Stadium, Los Angeles, California, U.S. | |
| 22 | Win | 20–1–1 | Neil John Tabanao | KO | 3 (10), 2:30 | Oct 30, 2020 | Fantasy Springs Resort Casino, Indio, California, U.S. | |
| 21 | Loss | 19–1–1 | Jamel Herring | UD | 12 | Nov 9, 2019 | Chukchansi Park, Fresno, California, U.S. | For WBO super featherweight title |
| 20 | Win | 19–0–1 | Jonathan Oquendo | UD | 10 | May 4, 2019 | T-Mobile Arena, Paradise, Nevada, U.S. | Retained WBO International super featherweight title Won WBO-NABO super featherweight title |
| 19 | Win | 18–0–1 | Alberto Mercado | UD | 10 | Dec 15, 2018 | Madison Square Garden, New York City, New York, U.S. | Retained WBO International super featherweight title |
| 18 | Win | 17–0–1 | Deivis Julio Bassa | RTD | 6 (10), 3:00 | Jul 20, 2018 | Grand Oasis Arena, Cancún, Quintana Roo, Mexico | Won vacant WBO International super featherweight title |
| 17 | Draw | 16–0–1 | Orlando Cruz | SD | 10 | Apr 19, 2018 | Coliseo José Miguel Agrelot, San Juan, Puerto Rico | For vacant WBO International super featherweight title |
| 16 | Win | 16–0 | Rey Perez | UD | 10 | Nov 30, 2017 | MGM National Harbor, Oxon Hill, Maryland, U.S. | |
| 15 | Win | 15–0 | Luis Hinojosa | TKO | 1 (10), 2:04 | Oct 21, 2017 | Turning Stone Resort Casino, Verona, New York, U.S. | |
| 14 | Win | 14–0 | Jesús Valdez Barrayan | UD | 10 | Jun 30, 2017 | Fantasy Springs Resort Casino, Indio, California, U.S. | Retained WBC Youth Silver super featherweight title |
| 13 | Win | 13–0 | Alejandro Valdez | KO | 1 (8), 1:41 | Jan 28, 2017 | Fantasy Springs Resort Casino, Indio, California, U.S. | Won vacant WBC Youth Silver super featherweight title |
| 12 | Win | 12–0 | Mario Antonio Macías | KO | 3 (8), 0:07 | Sep 2, 2016 | Belasco Theatre, New York City, New York, U.S. | |
| 11 | Win | 11–0 | José Arturo Esquivel | UD | 8 | May 7, 2016 | T-Mobile Arena, Paradise, Nevada, U.S. | |
| 10 | Win | 10–0 | Jesús Lule | UD | 8 | Mar 5, 2016 | D.C. Armory, Washington, D.C., U.S. | |
| 9 | Win | 9–0 | José Bustos | UD | 6 | Oct 17, 2015 | Madison Square Garden, New York City, New York, U.S. | |
| 8 | Win | 8–0 | Christian Santibanez | UD | 6 | Jun 30, 2015 | 2300 Arena, Philadelphia, Pennsylvania, U.S. | |
| 7 | Win | 7–0 | José Miguel Castro | UD | 6 | Apr 18, 2015 | Turning Stone Resort Casino, Verona, New York, U.S. | |
| 6 | Win | 6–0 | Herbert Quartey | TKO | 4 (6), 2:34 | Jan 20, 2015 | 2300 Arena, Philadelphia, Pennsylvania, U.S. | |
| 5 | Win | 5–0 | Alexander Charneco | UD | 4 | Dec 6, 2014 | Barclays Center, New York City, New York, U.S. | |
| 4 | Win | 4–0 | Rafael Francis | TKO | 1 (4), 2:11 | Oct 30, 2014 | Memorial Hall, Plymouth, Massachusetts, U.S. | |
| 3 | Win | 3–0 | Rocco Espinoza | MD | 4 | Sep 6, 2014 | U.S. Bank Arena, Cincinnati, Ohio, U.S. | |
| 2 | Win | 2–0 | Miguel Antonio Rodríguez | RTD | 1 (4), 3:00 | Jun 5, 2014 | House of Blues, Boston, Massachusetts, U.S. | |
| 1 | Win | 1–0 | Victor Galindo | UD | 4 | Apr 19, 2014 | D.C. Armory, Washington, D.C., U.S. | |

== See also ==
- List of world super-featherweight boxing champions

Sporting positions
Amateur boxing titles
| Previous: Albert Bell | Golden Gloves lightweight champion 2013 | Next: Maliek Montgomery |
Regional boxing titles
| Vacant Title last held by Cristian Ruben Gramajo | WBC Youth Silver super-featherweight champion January 28, 2017 – 2018; Vacated | Vacant Title next held by Moussa Gholam |
| Vacant Title last held by José López | WBO International super-featherweight champion July 20, 2018 – 2019; Vacated | Vacant Title next held by Mark Urvanov |
| Preceded by Jonathan Oquendo | NABO super-featherweight champion May 4, 2019 – 2019; Vacated | Vacant Title next held by Albert Bell |
| Vacant Title last held by Abraham Nova | NABA super-featherweight champion December 18, 2021 – November 25, 2023; Won world title | Vacant |
World boxing titles
| Preceded by Héctor García | WBA super-featherweight champion November 25, 2023 – December 6, 2025; Stripped | Succeeded by James Dickens; Interim champion promoted |
