= Gervonta Davis =

American boxer (born 1994)

- Davis in 2023

Personal information
- Nickname: Tank
- Born: Gervonta Bryant Davis; November 7, 1994 (age 32) Baltimore, Maryland, U.S.
- Height: 5 ft 5 in (165 cm)
- Weight: Super featherweight; Lightweight; Light welterweight

Boxing career
- Reach: 67 1/2 in (171 cm)
- Stance: Southpaw

Boxing record
- Total fights: 31
- Wins: 30
- Win by KO: 28
- Draws: 1
Medal record
Men's amateur boxing
Golden Gloves
Gold medal – first place	2012 Mesquite	Bantamweight

Gervonta Bryant Davis (/dʒərˈvɒnteɪ/ jər-VON-tay; born November 7, 1994), also known by his nickname "Tank", is an American professional boxer. He held the World Boxing Association (WBA) lightweight title from 2023 to 2026, and held the International Boxing Federation (IBF) super featherweight title in 2017, the WBA (Super version) super featherweight title twice between 2018 and 2020, the WBA super lightweight title (Regular version) in 2021, and WBA lightweight regular version from 2019 to 2023.

== Early life ==
Davis was raised in the Sandtown-Winchester community in West Baltimore, one of the most crime-ridden areas of the city. His parents were drug addicts, and were frequently in and out of jail. Davis has one brother named Damien. He attended Digital Harbor High School, a local magnet school, but dropped out to focus on his career. He later earned his secondary degree through a GED program.

== Amateur career ==
Davis has been training at Upton Boxing Center since he was five years old. Davis is trained by Calvin Ford who was the inspiration for the character Dennis "Cutty" Wise on the hit HBO television series, The Wire. Davis won the 2012 National Golden Gloves Championship, three straight National Silver Gloves Championships from 2006 to 2008, two National Junior Olympics gold medals, two National Police Athletic League Championships, and two Ringside World Championships. Davis finished his amateur career with a record of 206 wins and 15 losses.

== Professional career ==
=== Super featherweight ===
==== Early career ====
Davis made his debut at the age of 18 on February 22, 2013, against Desi Williams, who had a professional record of 0 wins and 4 losses, all by stoppage. The fight took place at the D.C. Armory in Washington on the undercard of IBF junior welterweight fight between Lamont Peterson and Kendall Holt. Davis won the bout via first-round knockout (KO). By August 2014, Davis had recorded 8 wins and no losses, with all wins coming inside the distance. Davis was taken the full distance for the first time in October 2014 against veteran 28-year-old Germán Meraz (47–31–1, 25 KOs). Davis knocked Meraz down in rounds three and five, and went on to win a unanimous decision (UD), with all three judges scoring the bout 60–52. Nonetheless, Meraz became the 1st fighter to go the full distance against Davis.

On February 20, 2015, at the CONSOL Energy Center in Pittsburgh, Pennsylvania, Davis became the first person to stop Israel Suarez (4–4–2, 1 KO), winning in devastating fashion with a first-round KO.

On May 22, 2015, at The Claridge Hotel in Atlantic City, New Jersey, Davis scored a technical knockout (TKO) against Alberto Mora (5–3, 1 KO) 1 minute 14 seconds into the fight. The normally durable Mora was stopped for the first time in his career. On September 12, 2015, at the MGM Grand Garden Arena in Las Vegas on Showtime as part of the Floyd Mayweather Jr. vs. Andre Berto undercard, Davis defeated Recky Dulay (8–1, 5 KOs) in only 94 seconds. On October 30, 2015, at The Venue at UCF in Orlando, Florida, on Bounce TV, Davis defeated veteran 38-years-old former featherweight title holder Cristobal Cruz (40–18–4, 24 KOs).

On December 18, 2015, at the Palms Casino Resort in Las Vegas on Spike TV, Davis scored a ninth-round KO over Luis Sanchez (17–4–1, 5 KOs). On April 1, 2016, at the D.C. Armory on Spike TV, Davis defeated Guillermo Avila (16–5, 13 KOs) by KO in the sixth round. On June 3, 2016, at the Seminole Hard Rock Hotel and Casino in Hollywood, Florida, as part of a Premier Boxing Champions card, Davis knocked out Mario Antonio Macias (28–18, 14 KOs) with his first punch of the fight, which lasted only 41 seconds.

==== Davis vs. Pedraza ====
On November 15, 2016 ESPN announced that Davis would challenge for the IBF super featherweight title against undefeated José Pedraza (22–0, 12 KOs) on January 14, 2017, at the Barclays Center in New York on Showtime. The fight would take place as an undercard fight to the super middleweight world title unification fight between James DeGale and Badou Jack. The IBF granted Pedraza an exemption to fight Davis, as he had a mandatory fight against Liam Walsh looming. Prior to the fight being announced, Mayweather Promotions matchmakers tried to make a deal for Davis to fight titleholder Jason Sosa. In a very competitive fight Davis defeated Pedraza in a seventh-round KO to win the IBF super featherweight title. After the fight, Davis said that he had studied the early career of his promoter and mentor, Floyd Mayweather Jr., in order to stay composed. He said, "I had a lot of experience [from the amateur ranks], but I learned how to keep my composure. Floyd told me to stay calm, and I studied Floyd Mayweather [videos] when he was 'Pretty Boy.' My uppercut was my best shot, and it was landing all night. It felt really good to fight the way I did. I could take it and dish it out." Mayweather Jr. himself enthusiastically branded his protégé as the future of boxing. For the fight, Davis earned $75,000 compared to Pedraza, who earned the larger sum of $225,000, in what was his third defense. At the time of stoppage, Davis was ahead 59–55 on all three judges' scorecards.

==== Davis vs. Walsh ====
On May 7, 2017, it was announced Davis would travel to London, England for his first title defense. The news came from Frank Warren, promoter of challenger Liam Walsh (21–0, 14 KO), who was also ranked number 1 by the IBF. The fight was scheduled to take place on May 20, 2017, and billed as 'Show me the Money'. At the official weigh in on May 19, Davis showed up overweight and was given 2 hours to make weight. His first attempt, although he was naked, he weighed two ounces over. He was then given two hours to attempt to lose the extra weight, although he came back earlier thinking he had lost it but was still over the limit. He eventually met the limit of 130 pounds on his third attempt. Davis stopped Walsh in the third-round to retain his IBF title. After two cagey rounds, which were controlled by Davis, he came out with power punches at the start of the third. Walsh's legs looked to give way and Davis pounced with accurate hooks to the head, eventually dropping Walsh. Walsh beat the count. The fight resumed and Davis went on the attack again, connecting with every shot he threw, then referee Michael Alexander decided stop the fight, even though Walsh wanted to continue. The time of stoppage was 2 minutes and 11 seconds of round three. Many at ringside believed the stoppage was premature, including Walsh, "That was a bad stoppage. He's very fast and very active but it was too quick. He won fair and square but in England sometimes they stop the fight too early." The fight was shown live on Showtime in the U.S. averaging 228,000 viewers and peaking at 253,000 viewers.

==== Davis vs. Fonseca ====
According to TMZ Sports in early July 2017, it was reported that Davis would feature in the co-main event of Floyd Mayweather Jr. vs. Conor McGregor on August 26, 2017, at the T-Mobile Arena in Paradise, Nevada. On July 29, The Ring magazine reported that Davis would likely defend his IBF title against former WBO champion Román Martínez, whose last fight was a KO loss to Vasyl Lomachenko in June 2016. On August 10, Ringtv reported that Davis would instead fight unbeaten prospect Francisco Fonseca (19–0–1, 13 KOs), who at the time was ranked number 7 by the IBF. According to some sources, the potential fight with Martínez was dropped due to it being short notice and Martínez would not have had enough time to make the 130-pound limit. Prior to the fight being announced, the IBF had ordered Fonseca to fight their number 3 ranked Billy Dib (42–4, 24 KOs) in a final eliminator, as they were the two highest ranked available. At the weigh in, Fonseca came in at the 130-pound limit. Davis showed up an hour late and came in at 132 pounds, 2 pounds over the weight limit. Davis declined to weigh in after two hours, thus he was stripped of the IBF title. The title was declared vacant, but the title would be still up for grabs if Fonseca secured victory. In what was billed as an easy fight for Davis, he won the fight via KO in round eight, with the ending being controversial. The final punch appeared to be an illegal punch to the back of the head to Fonseca and referee Russell Mora counted him out 39 seconds into the round. After the fight, Davis mocked Fonseca. Fonseca appeared hurt before the knockout blow, which Davis, who was being booed by the crowd, explained to Jim Gray of Showtime in the post fight interview, "I actually caught him with a body shot before that and he was hurt. So he took advantage of me hitting him in the back of his head and went down." With the win, Davis scored his tenth-straight KO victory. Due to Davis winning the fight, the IBF title remained vacant. For the fight, Davis earned a purse of $600,000 compared to the amount $35,000 that Fonseca received.

==== Davis vs. Cuellar ====
On November 15, 2017, Leonard Ellerbe, CEO of Mayweather Promotions announced that Davis would be making his in ring return in the first quarter of 2018 alongside stablemate Badou Jack. He also revealed that Davis would fight a high-level opponent. According to Ellerbe, Davis would remain at super featherweight and likely challenge for a world title in 2018. On January 24, 2018, Showtime announced that Davis would next appear on television on the undercard of Broner vs. Vargas on April 21 at the Barclays Center in New York. A day later, Ellerbe stated a deal was close to being reached for Davis to fight former world champion and IBF #3 Billy Dib (43–4, 24 KOs, 2 NC) in what would be an IBF eliminator. A purse bid, which was due to take place on January 25 was postponed to February 6. On February 21, it was reported by ESPN that the fight would not happen. Instead it was stated Davis' likely opponent would be Jesús Cuellar (28–2, 21 KOs). On March 5, the fight was finalized for the vacant WBA (Regular) super featherweight title. Cuellar was moving up from featherweight for the fight, he was coming off a loss, and 2 years of inactivity. Prior to the fight, Alberto Machado, the WBA (Super) champion at the same weight class, was inexplicably downgraded to 'Regular' champion, and the Davis-Cuellar fight was upgraded to be for Machado's WBA (Super) super featherweight title.

In front of 13,964 in attendance, Davis knocked out Cuellar in round three. Davis first knocked down Cuellar in round two courtesy of a left hook to the body and then put him down twice in round three to get the stoppage. Referee Benjy Esteves Jr. stopped the action at 2 minutes 45 seconds into the round. Davis landed 49% of his power shots in the fight. Both boxers earned $350,000 apiece. After the fight, Davis stated he wanted to unify with the winner of Tevin Farmer vs. Billy Dib, which would be contested for the IBF belt, the same belt Davis was stripped of. The bout opened Showtime's broadcast and averaged 460,000 viewers and peaked at 527,000 viewers.

==== Cancelled Abner Mares fight ====
In November 2018, Davis announced that he would defend his WBA title in February 2019 against former titlist Abner Mares (31–3–1, 15 KOs) in Southern California. The fight was first teased by Mayweather via social media in August 2018, with no mention of a date or venue. The fight would see Mares moving up from featherweight, having lost his last fight in June 2018 against Léo Santa Cruz. When the fight was announced, there was a lot of talk of Mares being 'thrown to the wolves' and that he had no real chance against Davis. Mares hit back at critics explaining it was his decision to move up in weight and test himself. On December 14, the fight was confirmed to take place on February 9, 2019, at Pechanga Arena in San Diego on Showtime. A week later the venue was changed to Dignity Health Sports Park, in Carson, California, formerly known as StubHub Center. Mares and Davis ultimately did not fight on the scheduled date after Mares suffered a potential career ending injury, a detached retina, during sparring.

==== Davis vs. Ruiz ====
On January 30, 2019, PBC announced that former WBC super bantamweight champion Hugo Ruiz (39-4, 33 KOs) had stepped in to replace Mares to challenge Davis for the WBA super featherweight title. The fight was scheduled to take place on February 9, broadcast on Showtime, at the Dignity Health Sports Park in Carson, California. Ruiz, who was known as an aggressive, all-action brawler, last fought at featherweight a month prior against Alberto Guevara. Ruiz's promoter, Oswaldo Küchle, confirmed that after his last win, he went back into training, so he was fully prepared to challenge Davis. According to PBC, the event was already sold out. When Ruiz was added to the card, Davis was initially unaware of him but soon learned that Ruiz was a larger and stronger opponent, presenting a different set of challenges. Davis expected a tougher fight than the one scheduled against Mares. Ruiz also believed he had more punching power than Mares. The weigh-in took place at the Los Angeles Airport Westin. Davis had to make a few attempts to reach the contracted weight. First, he stepped on the scale, weighing 130.4 pounds. He then removed his underwear and weighed 130.2 pounds. The commission granted him 30 minutes to lose the remaining weight. When he returned, he was below the limit, at 129.8 pounds. Davis blamed the discrepancy on the difference between the scale in his hotel room and the CSAC scale. He stated that he was not dehydrated and felt physically well. Davis did not show any signs of excessive weight cutting. Ruiz weighed in at 129.5 pounds. Davis later admitted that he did gain too much weight since his last fight, which was ten months before.

Davis dominated Ruiz with a first-round knockout to retain his WBA title. The attendance was 8,048 on the night. From the opening bell, Ruiz retreated and began defending cautiously. He was unprepared for Davis's aggressive pace and pressure. He landed powerful combinations. Towards the end of the round, Davis cornered Ruiz and landed a right hook, followed by a straight left, which broke Ruiz's nose and caused bleeding. Ruiz beat referee Jack Reiss's count after being knocked down but did not answer his call to continue. The fight was stopped with just one second remaining in the first round. This marked Davis' twelfth consecutive knockout and his eighth first-round KO. Ruiz’s corner confirmed he was too hurt to continue. After the fight, Davis said, “Tonight I just wanted to put on a great performance.” Reiss explained the stoppage to Jim Gray, “Ruiz didn’t answer me. I told him clearly, in the dressing room, what he needed to do. When I asked him in Spanish if he wanted to continue, he didn’t answer. He basically made the decision. If he just [nodded his head], we would have kept going.” Davis wanted a homecoming return in July 2019. According to CompuBox statistics, Davis landed 11 of 56 punches thrown (20%), and Ruiz landed only 3 of 19 (16%). According to Forbes, Davis was paid $1 million for the fight and Ruiz had a $100,000 purse. The fight averaged 429,000 viewers, peaking at 486,000 viewers.

==== Davis vs. Núñez ====
On May 7, 2019, Davis was ordered by the WBA to make a mandatory defense against Panamanian boxer Ricardo Núñez (21-2, 19 KOs), who had not lost a fight since 2015. Both teams were given a 30-day negotiation period. Núñez's last loss came against Barnie Arguelles, after which he avenged the defeat by knockout in a rematch. On May 16, it was reported that negotiations were underway, with both teams looking to agree on terms for a fight to take place at the Royal Farms Arena in Baltimore on July 27, on Showtime. Originally, the plans were for Davis to have his homecoming fight against former featherweight champion Yuriorkis Gamboa. The fight was officially announced on June 6. The event marked a significant milestone, as Davis was the first Baltimore native to defend a world title in his hometown since Harry Jeffra in 1940. It was also the first world championship in Baltimore in nearly 50 years. It was Núñez's first professional fight in the United States. Leonard Ellerbe stated that it was a long-standing desire to bring a world title fight to Baltimore for Davis, who aimed to deliver a memorable event for his Baltimore supporters. There were some pre-fight tensions and confident predictions from both fighters. Davis mocked Núñez’s claim that he could knock him out, then stated he urgently had to train and implied confidence in his own power. Núñez responded confidently, saying he was not intimidated by Davis’ undefeated status or power and promised a "great show" for the fans. Both promised the fight would not go the distance. Núñez had an 83% knockout rate; however, he fought a much lower calibre of opponents. Davis made weight with no issue, coming in at 129½ pounds. Núñez came in slightly lighter, at 128¾ pounds.

Davis retained his title, in front of a sell-out 14,686 fans in attendance, knocking Núñez out in the second round. Davis controlled the fight early, inviting Núñez forward before landing a left hook. Núñez was then pushed back against the ropes, defenseless, prompting referee Harvey Dock to stop the fight half way through the round. At the time, Núñez had taken several unanswered shots and was unable to defend himself. After the fight, Davis said, "It was amazing to fight in front of friends and family. It means a lot. This was not just a win for me, but a win for Baltimore." He also paid tribute to the recent deaths of boxers Maxim Dadashev and Hugo Alfredo Santillan during his post-fight speech. He then called for unification fights, mentioning Tevin Farmer. Mayweather praised Davis as “an unbelievable fighter” and “something special.” He also praised Davis’s charisma, projecting him as a future pay-per-view star and major figure in boxing. The fight peaked 594,000 viewers on Showtime.

=== Lightweight ===
In September 2019, it was reported that Davis had vacated his super featherweight title in order to move up in weight to lightweight. Not only did Davis want to establish himself as a multi-weight champion, but the move also stemmed from the lack of major fights at super featherweight. He also downplayed talks that he was moving up in weight due to weight issues, stating that he had no issues with making 130 pounds. He remained open to returning to the lower weight if a significant fight opportunity arose. Ahead of the move, the WBA placed Davis as the No. 1 contender at lightweight. Negotiations with Yuriorkis Gamboa (30–2, 18 KOs) were being held.

==== Davis vs. Gamboa ====
On October 16, 2019, Mike Coppinger reported that Davis would fight veteran 38-year-old former featherweight champion Gamboa on December 28, with the fight to be televised by Showtime as the main event of a tripleheader. On October 25, the fight was announced to take place at the State Farm Arena in Atlanta, Georgia, marking a significant boxing occasion for the city after a long hiatus. Davis was excited about bringing a major boxing event back to Atlanta, a city he considered his "second home." He expected a challenging fight, acknowledging Gamboa’s status as a respected and accomplished boxer. The fight was contested for the vacant WBA 'regular' lightweight title, with the winner being in position to challenge Lomachenko for the full championship status.

There were 14,129 fans in attendance. In a competitive fight, Davis dropped Gamboa three times, winning via twelfth-round technical knockout. The first knockdown came in the second round. Before the fourth, Gamboa's assistant taped his boot for extra support. In the fifth round, Davis rocked Gamboa multiple times but he stayed on his feet. In the eighth, Davis landed a powerful left hand that dropped Gamboa a second time. In the eleventh, Davis landed a hard straight left, pushing Gamboa to the ropes. In the final round, Davis delivered two knockdowns, forcing referee Jack Reiss to stop the fight at 1:17 with a left uppercut knockout. At the time of stoppage, two judges scored the fight 109–98, and the third judge scored it 109–97, all for Davis. According to CompuBox punch stats, Davis had landed 120 of 321 punches thrown (37%), while Gamboa landed 78 of 617 thrown (13%).

Gamboa experienced serious leg issues during the fight, including a possible Achilles tendon rupture in the second round, which he revealed after the bout: “I think I ruptured my Achilles tendon… I can’t put pressure on it. I wanted to keep going; I’m a warrior.” He also had problems with his shoe, which contributed to his mobility issues. Davis praised Gamboa for being a tough opponent and rated his own performance as a C+, admitting he did not feel his best. Davis expected a big year ahead in 2020 and felt comfortable at 130 or 135 pounds. His performance received some mixed reactions from fellow boxers. The fight, which marked the first time Davis had gone past nine rounds as a professional, peaked 604,000 viewers, averaging 577,000 viewers. This was behind Wilder’s first-round knockout of Breazeale, which lasted less than 3 minutes and averaged 886,000 viewers on Showtime.

In January 2020, Gamboa was diagnosed with a complete tear and retraction of his right Achilles tendon and required surgery. Having fought with the injury for ten rounds, he was hoping to gain another fight against Davis.

=== Return to super featherweight ===
==== Davis vs. Santa Cruz ====
In April 2020, Léo Santa Cruz (37-1-1, 19 KOs) revealed he planned on fighting Davis at 130 pounds. In May, Leonard Ellerbe announced that Davis and Santa Cruz had agreed on terms to fight later in the year. In July, Showtime announced the boxers would headline a PPV event on October 24 at Mohegan Sun Arena in Uncasville, Connecticut. Fans were not permitted to attend; however, there was potential for the venue to be moved to the West Coast if COVID-19 policies allowed. Santa Cruz stated he actively sought the bout against Davis through adviser Al Haymon, after facing criticism in recent years for the quality of his opposition. He collected the WBA (super) super featherweight title after defeating Miguel Flores in November 2019, the same belt Davis vacated. The card aired live on Channel 5 in the UK. Davis was moving back down in weight for the fight, however, his lightweight title would also be at stake along with Santa Cruz's super featherweight belt. The weight limit set for the fight was 130 pounds. In preparation for the fight, which was a big challenge for him, Santa Cruz sparred welterweights. This was to prepare for Davis’s power and size advantage. Although Santa Cruz had a height advantage of two inches over Davis, Davis was expected to be the more powerful and physically imposing fighter. Santa Cruz was given little chance of beating Davis. Teofimo Lopez called Davis "sad", stating he could be fighting boxers at lightweight instead. Despite the rumours surrounding Davis's weight issues, Santa Cruz had no concern regarding Davis making the contracted weight. He believed Davis would meet the requirement because of the financial penalties involved if he failed to do so. The penalty was in place for both boxers. Santa Cruz indicated the fines would motivate Davis to comply with the weight condition. Speaking in third person, Davis told Brian Custer, “Gervonta Davis definitely will make the weight.”

On October 1, the event was rescheduled to take place a week later on October 31, and the location was changed to the Alamodome in San Antonio, Texas. The move was done to allow fans to attend the event and allowed seven more days for tickets to sell. With it being his PPV headliner, Ellerbe said there was no turning back from this, and claimed Davis would now move forward as a PPV star. Davis weighed in at 129.8 pounds, whilst Santa Cruz weighed 129.6 pounds.

In front of 9,024 socially distanced fans in attendance, Davis defeated Santa Cruz via sixth-round knockout, successfully capturing the WBA (Super) super featherweight title, while retaining his WBA lightweight belt, with Santa Cruz visibly shaken but recovering post-fight. From the opening round, Davis established dominance with his jab and counterpunching, while Santa Cruz responded with aggressive body shots and right hands. He landed a straight right at 2:05, which dropped Davis, but it was ruled a trip due to tangled legs. Heavy combinations were landed by both boxers in the fourth round. Santa Cruz accurately landed his right hands, and Davis landed a notable left uppercut. The pace slowed down in the fifth round. The end came in the sixth round after Davis cornered Santa Cruz and landed a perfectly timed left uppercut, knocking him down flat on his back. Referee Rafael Ramos stopped the fight immediately at 2 minutes and 40 seconds. Santa Cruz lay motionless for several seconds but eventually got back on his feet, marking Davis as the first fighter to stop Santa Cruz in his career.

During the post-fight, Davis said of Santa Cruz, “He’s a tough warrior, and he came to fight.” On the knockout, he said, “He punches, but he doesn’t try to get out of the way. There was nowhere for him to go on that knockout because I got him into the corner.” Santa Cruz, although clearly affected by the loss, recovered after the fight and was conscious post-knockout, showing sportsmanship. During post-fight press conference, he stated he was unsure what he would do next in his career, with retirement also a possibility. Notable boxers and analysts reacted positively to the fight and knockout blow.

At the time of the stoppage, Davis was leading on all three judges' scorecards by the identical margin, 48–47. Over the course of just under six rounds, Davis had been out-landed and out-thrown by his opponent despite being the more accurate boxer: he landed 84 of 227 punches thrown (37%), while Santa Cruz landed 97 of 390 thrown (25%). His knockout of Santa Cruz was selected as the winner of The Ring Magazine Knockout of The Year award for 2020. Prior to the fight, Mayweather was hoping the fight would attract around 1 million PPV buys, up to 2 million. The event reportedly sold around 225,000 PPV's.

=== Super lightweight ===
==== Davis vs. Barrios ====
On April 15, 2021, PBC and Showtime announced that Davis would be moving up in weight to challenge Mario Barrios (26-0, 17 KOs) for his WBA (regular) super lightweight title, in his second consecutive PPV main event on June 26. Davis was giving up a height advantage, as well as facing a genuine super lightweight, with Barrios having fought in the weight class for four years. On May 19, the card was officially announced to take place at the State Farm Arena in Atlanta. The PPV was being priced at $74.99, the same amount charged for Davis' first PPV headline. This was an attempt for Davis to become a three-weight world champion. Some critics accused Davis of “cherry-picking” title fights, but Ellerbe rejected these claims, stating the dangers Davis had to overcome due to Barrios' size. Ellerbe did admit that he was not enthusiastic about the fight but praised Davis' determination to accept the challenge. Davis said he faced a challenging scenario, describing the fight as a "no-win situation" in the eyes of both critics and fans. If he won, detractors would dismiss Barrios as a "paper champion" chosen to avoid facing legitimate lightweight threats. If Barrios won, Davis's team’s matchmaking strategy and his PPV appeal would be seen as failures due to perceived greed in taking an unsafe challenge. Ahead of the fight, Davis was a 5-1 favorite. He weighed in at 139¾ pounds, and Barrios weighed 139½ pounds.

On the night, in front of a sell-out crowd of 16,570, Davis prevailed in a competitive fight, knocking his opponent down twice in the eighth round, and again in the eleventh round. Davis admitted it took him a while to adjust to the new weight. The beginning of the end came in the eighth round when he landed a sweeping right hook followed by a left hook, sending Barrios down twice, his first career knockdowns. Barrios came back in the ninth round, hurt Davis with a left hand, and managed to regain a round by out-landing him. Both traded heavy shots to the head and body in the tenth. In the eleventh, Davis landed a left uppercut to the body, sending Barrios down a third time. Barrios beat the count but was met with a flurry of shots, prompting referee Thomas Taylor to stop the fight at 2:13 of the round. Davis was leading on all three judges' scorecards, with scores of 97–91 and 96–92 twice, at the time of the stoppage. Despite this, Mayweather told Davis before round 11 that he was behind on the cards. The fight was much closer through the first six rounds (58-56 for Davis, 57-57 and 57-57), but Davis separated himself from Barrios thereafter.

According to CompuBox punch stats, Davis landed 96 of 296 total punches (32%), while Barrios connected on 93 of 394 total punches (24%). Davis was initially nervous about the risk of engaging too aggressively, particularly given the move up two weight classes and the difference in glove size. Davis’s caution was evident throughout the early rounds, as he sought to gauge Barrios’s strengths and avoid unnecessary risks. Sometime after the fight, Barrios revealed that the fight included a 10lb rehydration clause.

=== Return to lightweight ===
==== Davis vs. Cruz ====
On October 7, 2021, it was announced that Davis would headline his third consecutive Showtime pay-per-view on December 5, a special Sunday broadcast. His opponent was stablemate Rolly Romero (14–0, 12 KOs), who was also the mandatory challenger for Davis's WBA lightweight title. The fight took place at the Staples Center in Los Angeles. On October 30, Romero was pulled from the bout due to sexual assault allegations made against him. The accuser filed a police report, prompting an official investigation by the Henderson Police Department in Nevada. Mexican boxer Isaac Cruz (22-1-1, 15 KOs) was originally discussed as an opponent for Davis, before Romero landed the fight. He was the front-runner to replace Romero. On November 3, a month before the fight was scheduled, Cruz agreed a deal to fight Davis. Speaking on the new opponent, Davis said, “I respect Isaac Cruz for stepping up and taking the fight, but everyone knows what I do. I come in looking for the knockout and that’s exactly what I’m going to do in this fight." During fight week, British promoter Eddie Hearn and Ellerbe engaged in a dispute over the relative profiles and commercial appeal of their fighters and upcoming events. Hearn promoted a fight between Devin Haney and Joseph Diaz the night before Davis vs. Cruz. Hearn publicly criticized Ellerbe’s reliance on PPV, arguing that Haney’s fight with Diaz was more significant and commercially attractive. He stated that while Davis vs. Cruz was a decent fight, it lacked the profile to generate substantial PPV buys. Hearn mentioned that the Davis fight followed major recent events such as Crawford-Porter and Canelo, citing market saturation and a less impressive opponent in Cruz, who was less well-known. Ellerbe responded sharply, accusing Hearn of dishonesty and defending Davis’s commercial strength. He challenged Hearn’s claim about the size of Haney’s fight, pointing out that Haney had sold fewer than 4,000 tickets in a 15,000-seat venue, whereas Davis had already sold more tickets during his presale period.

There was an announced attendance of 15,580 in the arena. Davis won a hard-fought unanimous decision after 12 competitive rounds, despite suffering a hand injury mid-fight, to retain his world title. Both boxers delivered significant shots throughout the contest, with Davis landing his trademark hooks and uppercuts, while Cruz maintained constant pressure and never appeared to be seriously hurt. From the beginning, Cruz pursued Davis aggressively to close down the distance, while Davis adjusted his strategy by the third round, throwing uppercuts and using movement to control the fight. As the match progressed, Cruz's resilience and Davis’ hand injury made the fight increasingly competitive. Ultimately, Davis managed to edge out Cruz in key rounds, including the decisive final round, securing the victory on the judges’ scorecards 116-112, 115-113, 115-113.

After the bout, Davis confirmed the hand injury, stating he had to continue despite the pain: "I hurt my left hand in probably the sixth round but I've got to throw it. I have to go get it checked out. It's shaking but it is what it is." Davis landed 133 of 462 punches thrown (29%), and Cruz landed 121 of 553 (22%). Cruz called for a rematch, feeling he deserved the win, and Davis praised Cruz’s performance, saying, "He's a definite warrior. Even though he didn't get the win, a star was born tonight" This fight marked the first time Davis went to a decision since 2014 against Germán Meraz, ending a streak of 16 consecutive knockout victories. Following his win, Davis was required by the WBA to choose between weight divisions and subsequently vacated his WBA regular light welterweight title, opting instead to remain at lightweight.

==== Davis vs. Romero ====
On January 11, the investigation into sexual assault allegations against Rolando Romero (14–0, 12 KOs) was closed by Nevada police without charges due to insufficient evidence. The claims were found not to meet the legal criteria for sexual assault. Days later, the WBA again ordered Davis to make his WBA (Regular) title defense against Romero, and gave the pair until February 24 to come to terms. The fight aimed to resolve a long-standing rivalry. Romero began calling for a fight with Davis as early as 2017. According to Romero, the two were scheduled to spar in 2018; however, Davis did not turn up to the gym, which led to further public trash talk. The two also had a near altercation backstage at the Errol Spence vs. Mikey Garcia event in 2019. On March 4, it was announced that Davis would make a defense against Romero on June 4. Mayweather Promotions rescheduled the fight, as Romero remained the top contender and had already signed for the initial bout. Davis, who injured his left hand during his last fight, did not require surgery, which allowed him to return to the ring sooner. The fight was officially announced on March 8, to take place at the Barclays Center in New York, with a new date of May 28, on Showtime PPV. Davis entered as the favorite, while Romero prepared for the biggest opportunity of his career. Romero was vocal, criticizing Davis, claiming he built his career on smaller fighters and predicted a knockout victory. Davis dismissed Romero, stating relied on talk rather than skill. The event marked Davis' fourth straight PPV main event.

Davis began showing frustration with Floyd Mayweather as his contract neared its end. He posted and deleted criticism on social media directed at his promotional team. One specific issue arose when Mayweather held a press conference for his upcoming Dubai exhibition on the same day Davis was promoting his fight. Davis viewed this as undermining, though Mayweather denied any intention to overshadow him. Hall of Famer Roy Jones Jr. believed Davis could succeed without a promoter, stating he "doesn't need anybody anymore," and also stating that Davis already had strong name recognition. Davis later said the Romero fight would be his last with Mayweather and wanted to control his own career. Davis weighed in at 133¾ pounds and Romero weighed 134¼ pounds. After making the weigh-in, Davis pushed Romero off the stage following a tense face-off. No injuries occurred as Romero landed on his feet and immediately jumped back on the stage before being held back by security. Romero criticised Davis, calling the push reckless and dangerous, and argued that an injury to him could have cancelled the fight and cost both fighters significant earnings. He then accused Davis of being afraid, claiming he had a psychological advantage.

In front of a sold-out crowd of 18,970 in attendance, Davis defeated Romero via sixth-round technical knockout. Romero applied early pressure and enjoyed success with his jab, particularly in the second, third, and fifth rounds, landing shots that troubled Davis. Davis fought more cautiously early, choosing to wait for openings rather than engage immediately. In the sixth, after Romero appeared to lunge in, Davis landed a counter left hand that dropped Romero, prompting referee David Fields to stop the bout at 2:39 of the round. Davis led on two of three judges' scorecards, with scores of 49–46 and 48–47 at the time of the stoppage. The remaining judge had it 48–47 for Romero. During the post-fight interview, Davis said he was being patient intentionally: “I know when to take it to my opponents and when to chill out.” Asked about the knockout punch, he replied, “I didn’t even throw it that hard… he ran right into it.” Romero believed he exposed Davis and wanted a rematch, also acknowledging the mistake he made that led to the stoppage. According to CompuBox, Davis landed 25 of his 84 punches thrown (30%), and Romero landed 22 of 115 (19%). Davis initially laughed when he was told Romero wanted a rematch. He then dismissed the idea, suggesting the outcome of the fight did not justify another bout.

After the fight, a panic broke out inside Barclays Center when fans ran back into the arena after hearing a loud noise. Some believed there was an active shooter; however, authorities later confirmed that no shots were fired. The incident was caused by a “sound disturbance” outside the arena. Ten people were reported to have non-life-threatening injuries.

==== Davis vs. Héctor García ====
On November 18, 2022, Showtime announced Davis' next PPV fight to be held at the Capital One Arena in Washington, D.C. on January 7, 2023, against WBA super featherweight champion Héctor García (16–0, 10 KOs). The fight saw Garcia move up in weight to challenge for the lightweight world title. Garcia was happy for the opportunity, viewing it as life-changing, but believed he was being underestimated. Davis had already announced a future bout with Ryan Garcia. Garcia, who was entering the fight as an underdog, had previously upset Chris Colbert and defeated Roger Gutiérrez to win his title. He was focused on upsetting Davis and taking on Ryan Garcia next. Davis stated that his focus was on Héctor, as it was the fight he had to win, in order to fight Ryan next. The fight also marked Davis's first fight since splitting with long-time promoter Floyd Mayweather Jr. Davis was now self-promoting under his GTD brand. Despite the split, Davis said there was no bad blood with Mayweather or his team. He viewed this period as a trial phase where he could prove himself outside Mayweather’s influence. One of the main reasons for the split was Mayweather being focused on his own ventures, particularly exhibition fights, and being less active as a promoter. On December 27, Davis was arrested in Florida, on an alleged domestic violence incident. The next day, he was released on bail with a no-contact order and denied the accusations, claiming they were financially motivated. The fight was still scheduled to go ahead. Both weighed in at 134 pounds, one pound under the 135-pound limit. Unlike previous occasions, the weigh-in took place without drama. Heading into the fight, Davis was a heavy 14–1 favourite.

On the night, in front of a sell-out crowd of 19,731 in attendance, Davis defeated Garcia via ninth-round TKO, to retain his world title, and set up a high-profile showdown with Ryan Garcia. Davis started slowly, allowing Garcia to control the early rounds with his jab. From the fourth round onward, Davis adjusted and began landing more impactful punches. Davis began to find his rhythm as he landed a sharp counter right hand and several lefts that caught Garcia’s attention. It was evident that Garcia had started to feel Davis’s power. By the sixth round, Davis was more comfortable, landing heavier shots. Garcia was brave and continued trading but absorbed more damage. In the eighth round, the fight was briefly halted due to a ringside disturbance, disrupting momentum. After the restart, Davis landed a straight left hand that badly hurt Garcia. He followed up with a flurry of punches while Garcia was on unsteady legs. Garcia made it to the end of the round. As the ninth round began, Garcia informed his corner that he couldn't see properly and chose to retire on his stool 15 seconds into the round. At the time of stoppage, the three judges had it 78–73, 78–73, 78–74 in favor of Davis. According to CompuBox, Davis landed 99 of 239 punches thrown (41.4%) and Garcia landed 55 of 345 punches (15.9%).

Post-fight, Garcia explained his decision to retire on his stool. He said, “When I got the shot to my head in the final round, that’s when I couldn’t see from my eye. I didn’t know where I was when he hit me with that shot.” Garcia felt he was doing well up until that point. Some fans criticized Garcia, suggesting he quit, however he was praised by WBC president Mauricio Sulaiman, for his efforts and bravery to stay on his stool. Davis rejected the idea that the fight was close, despite being told otherwise mid-fight by his assistant trainer. He explained that he focused on outthinking Garcia rather than rushing in recklessly. His head trainer, Calvin Ford, praised his performance: “This fight right here, his IQ, he was analyzing … And then he came back to the corner… [assistant] coach Kenny [Ellis] was messing with him, saying, ‘It’s close’...” The fight generated approximately 200,000–225,000 PPV buys, making it the second-highest-selling PPV for Davis.

=== Catchweight ===
==== Davis vs. Ryan Garcia ====
The development of a fight between Davis and Ryan Garcia evolved over several years, beginning with early discussions in mid-2020 when both fighters publicly agreed, in principle, to face each other in 2021. On November 17, Davis and Garcia announced via Instagram that a deal had been reached for a fight in 2023, set at a 136-pound catchweight limit and planned as a Showtime Pay-Per-View main event. Davis confirmed he would fight on January 7, which was expected to headline a Showtime PPV event, taking place in Washington, D.C. Garcia had been planning to campaign at 140 pounds, but agreed to drop weight to face Davis. On January 18, De La Hoya confirmed that a contract had been received for the proposed bout, indicating that final details were being completed. The fight was targeted for April 15, 2023. The date was pushed back one week, to take place on April 22. The rematch clause was only in place for Davis, meaning that if Garcia was to lose the fight, he was not able to automatically activate a rematch clause. At the time of the fight being announced, Davis was a 3-1 favorite, according to Caesars Sportsbook. On March 7, the T-Mobile Arena was announced as the venue. On April 4, Davis claimed he had inside information from Garcia’s training camp, suggesting the existence of a “mole” or “snitch.” Davis indicated that this source had revealed details about Garcia being hurt during sparring, particularly to the body.

Ahead of the bout, Garcia revealed that his contract included a rehydration clause requiring him to weigh no more than 146 pounds on fight night, 10 pounds above the agreed catchweight of 136 pounds. Garcia stated that the restriction would not affect his performance, while De La Hoya described the clause as standard and had no concerns. Davis weighed 135¼ pounds and Garcia, weighed slightly more at 135½ pounds. There was a brief altercation during the face-off, where Davis lightly pushed Garcia before officials separated them. Both were required to adhere to a 146‑pound limit. Davis and Garcia both satisfied a contractual second-day weigh-in requirement, weighing 144.1 pounds and 144.9 pounds respectively.

In one of boxing's most anticipated fights of the year, Davis defeated Garcia via seventh-round knockout, with a decisive body shot. From the beginning, Garcia started aggressively, using right hands and hooks to back up Davis. The first round was largely an exploratory round, with both fighters working on distance and timing. In the second round, Garcia overextended with a left hook, allowing Davis to slip the punch and counter with a hard left hook, dropping Garcia. Despite beating the count, Garcia’s momentum slowed down, and he adopted a more cautious approach in the middle rounds. Between the third and sixth rounds, both exchanged jabs and body shots, with Davis targeting Garcia’s body, strategically to slow him down. Garcia regained some confidence in the sixth and landed several rights to Davis’ face, but Davis maintained composure. In the seventh round, Davis landed a powerful left hand to the body, causing Garcia to take a knee. He attempted to rise but, visibly in pain and struggling to breathe, could not continue. Referee Thomas Taylor counted him out at 1:44 of the round, resulting in a seventh-round knockout win for Davis. This marked Davis’ 29th professional win and 27th knockout, while Garcia suffered the first loss of his career, dropping to 23–1. At the time of stoppage, Davis was comfortably ahead on all 3 judges scorecards with scores 59–55 (twice) and 58–56.

After the stoppage, Davis stated that Garcia’s body language convinced him the fight was over even before the count was completed. He said: “I didn’t think it was over, but I seen his face. That’s what made me think it was over.” Davis also described the moment Garcia looked at him while on one knee: “When he was looking at me, I was looking at him like, trying to tell him, ‘Get up.’ And then he just shook his head no.” Davis also declared that he was the "face of boxing." According to CompuBox punch stats, Davis landed 35 of 103 punches thrown (34%) and Garcia landed 39 of his 163 thrown (24%). 18 of the shots landed from Davis were body shots, showing that he targeted the body, ultimately getting the stoppage win, via a body shot.

The fight reportedly sold over 1.2 million PPV buys on Showtime. It also generated approximately $22.8 million from ticket sales. The fight took place in front of a sell-out crowd of 20,842 fans.

=== 2nd return to lightweight ===
On November 29, 2023, WBA (Super) lightweight champion Devin Haney relinquished his title to move up to the super lightweight division to face WBC champion Regis Prograis. With Haney vacating his status as WBA (Super) lightweight champion, Davis was elevated to primary WBA lightweight champion.

==== Davis vs. Martin ====
In early February 2024, Frank Martin (18-0, 12 KOs) emerged as a leading contender for Davis’ next bout. He was undefeated and highly ranked across multiple sanctioning bodies and close to a world title opportunity. He had called for a fight with Davis multiple times and even shared a sparring history with him. Ellerbe commented on a potential bout, stating that although Martin was “a good” and “skilled” fighter, he did not believe he could defeat Davis. Ellerbe said that “Frank Martin can’t beat Tank Davis” and suggested that no current lightweight contender was capable of beating him. On February 22, it was reported that Davis would defend his title against Martin in a PBC PPV event scheduled for June 2024 in Las Vegas. The bout was expected to take place at the MGM Grand Garden Arena and marked Davis’ first fight in over 12 months. A week later, trainer Derrick James confirmed that Martin was already in the gym preparing despite the fight not being officially announced. Martin stated that "a lot of people are going to see the unexpected" and described the fight as an opportunity to "wake the world up” to his abilities. He also confirmed that the bout would take place under standard lightweight rules, with no rehydration clause or catchweight.

In April, the card was announced to take place on June 15, with David Benavidez featuring as co-main event. Davis described himself as “a different beast” ahead of the fight. He stated there were improvements in his skills, and discipline and ring intelligence. Davis indicated that he had evolved into a more complete fighter compared to earlier in his career. In May 2024, the WBA overturned plans to implement a 12-pound rehydration clause for the fight. The clause was initially proposed by WBA president Gilberto Mendoza. The decision was reversed after it emerged that the bout was already contracted without the provision and that Martin’s team had not been formally notified. Davis stated that he had been unaware of the proposal, while journalist Dan Rafael confirmed that "there is no rehydration clause" for the fight. The fight week press conference included both boxers exchange insults and threats without any escalation. They discussed past sparring sessions, where Martin claimed he had success, which Davis strongly disputed.

Davis defeated Martin via an eighth-round knockout, retaining his WBA title, in front of 13,249 fans. Martin began the fight by landing effective shots, using quick combinations and sharp footwork. Davis started cautiously, absorbing Martin’s shots while exploring Martin's tendencies. By the third round, Davis began to take control, pinning Martin against the ropes and increasing his output with power punches and body shots. In round 7, Davis increased his attack, landing repeated heavy blows, wearing down Martin. The fight ended in the eighth round when Davis trapped Martin in a corner, and landed a left uppercut followed by a left cross that knocked Martin flat on his back at 1:29. Martin was unable to rise before the referee counted ten, awarding Davis a victory via knockout. At the time of stoppage, all three judges had a scorecard of 67-66, in favor of Davis.

In the post-fight interview, Davis was satisfied with his performance, stating that he found his range early in the fight but ultimately executing his game plan effectively, allowed Martin expend energy before capitalizing with his power shots. He said, "I’m back... Once he tired himself out, I started picking him apart” and considered future opponents, including names like Vasiliy Lomachenko and Shakur Stevenson. According to CompuBox, Davis landed 79 of 178 punches thrown (44.4%) and Martin landed 81 of 270 (30%).

==== Davis vs. Roach ====
On September 30, 2024 it was announced that Lamont Roach, who at that time was also a WBA super featherweight champion, was granted special permission by the WBA to move up a weight class and challenge Davis for his WBA lightweight title on December 14, 2024. On October 6, 2024 the fight was confirmed to take place at Toyota Center in Houston, TX on December 14, 2024. Late October 2024, it was reported that the fight was postponed. On November 13, 2024 it was reported that the fight was targeted for March 1, 2025. On November 29, 2024, the bout between Davis and Roach was confirmed to be held on March 1, 2025 at Barclays Center in Brooklyn, New York.

Davis would retain his WBA lightweight title in a majority draw (115–113 Davis, 114–114, and 114–114), the first of his professional career. The decision was met with significant controversy, particularly due to a moment in the 9th round in which Davis suddenly took a knee following a quick jab from Roach. Davis then walked to his corner, motioned toward his left eye, and was wiped with a towel. Referee Steve Willis incorrectly did not call it a knockdown against Davis. Had the knockdown been correctly called, Roach would have won via unanimous decision and resulted in the first loss of Davis' career. Nevertheless, Roach was only the third fighter to go the distance with Davis, after Germán Meraz and Isaac Cruz. In the post-fight interview, Davis stated "I just got my hair done two days ago, and she put grease in it. [...] When you're sweating and things like that, the grease came into my face and burned my eyes." He then later expressed interest in rematching Roach. On March 4, 2025, it was reported that Roach's camp filed an appeal to the NYSAC to overturn the draw. 3 days later, the NYSAC stated that although Roach should have been credited with a knockdown against Davis, they opted not to overturn the result, claiming that "the referee's call was not outcome-determinative".

According to Dan Rafael, the PPV generated around 262,000 buys, grossing $21 million in revenue. The attendance was reported to be a record 19,250 for the Barclays Center. It was later reported the event sold 16,420 tickets with 766 comps, generating a $6,415,815 gate. The attendance was 2,064 lower than what was originally announced by PBC.

==== Inactivity and Loss of Title ====
On April 3, ESPN reported a rematch was being planned for June 21 between Davis and Roach with T-Mobile Arena being the potential venue. Sources claimed the fight would instead take place at the end of Summer. In May, Brunch Boxing's Matthew “Bellini” Brown revealed the fight would take place on August 16 in Las Vegas. On June 20, Roach put out a tweet claiming Davis was yet to sign his end of the deal. After Davis was arrested for battery on July 11, the prospect of a rematch with Roach appeared increasingly doubtful. On August 16, Roach stated he would no longer pursue the rematch with Davis and felt Davis was never keen to give him a rematch. Four days later, Davis announced an exhibition fight with Jake Paul in November 2025. The WBA was expected to review Davis' championship status because of the failure to schedule the required rematch. On January 17, 2026, the WBA downgraded his status to “Champion in recess” due to his ongoing legal troubles. On January 19, 2026, it was revealed more that Davis had in fact been stripped of the WBA lightweight title, with this decision initially being announced on January 16, 2026 by WBA president Gilberto Mendoza on a Spanish-language talk show, after an arrest warrant was issued against him for domestic violence accusations. On May 23, the WBA ordered Davis to defend his lightweight title against mandatory challenger Floyd Schofield. This was despite multiple reports in January 2026 stating that Davis had been placed in the WBA’s “Champion in Recess” status. Both camps had until June 22 to reach an agreement, after which a purse bid could be called. The order was issued because Davis’ mandatory title defense was overdue under WBA rules. On June 7, according to Schofield’s team, negotiations were on hold, likely due to Davis’ legal situation, which left the situation unresolved. They were waiting for the negotiation period to end on June 22. Davis was named WBA 'champion in recess', which allowed the organisation to order Schofield to fight Lucas Bahdi for the vacant world title.

On March 9, 2026, Ring Magazine reported that Davis was in negotiations for a rematch against Isaac Cruz (28-3-2, 18 KOs) at super lightweight in the Summer, on Prime Video PPV. Davis’ decision to grant a rematch to Cruz would see some criticism for not offering Roach an immediate rematch after their draw. On June 23, it was announced that Davis would be training with Jose Benavidez Sr., father and trainer of David Benavidez. During an interview days later, Benavidez Sr. dismissed the idea of Davis rematching Cruz, stating that Davis won the first bout and there was "no need" for a rematch. In July, it was reported that Davis would not return to the ring until early 2027. According to Mike Coppinger, Bill Haney had been informed by Al Haymon that Davis was unavailable for a fight later in 2026, putting a potential bout with Devin Haney on hold.

In November 2026, Davis posted on social media that he would return in Spring of 2027 against former world champion George Kambosos (22–4, 10 KOs) in Chicago.

== Exhibition bout ==
=== Cancelled Jake Paul fight ===
On August 20, 2025, it was announced that Davis would take on Jake Paul in an exhibition on November 14 at the State Farm Arena in Atlanta, Georgia, with Netflix livestreaming the event. On September 17, the event was moved to the Kaseya Center in Miami, Florida after both Paul and Davis withdrew their request for event permits in Atlanta. Rick Thompson, chairman of the Georgia Athletic and Entertainment Commission stated that the bout "is the dumbest (expletive) I've ever heard," and "it's a money grabber, and I'm not OK with that." Davis, unusually punctual, lacked enthusiasm at the press conference and missed fight details. Paul's reading jab created awkwardness. Davis rejected being boxing's face, while Paul cited stats to support his claim. The banter was weak: Davis called Paul a "clown," and Paul alluded to Davis's legal troubles. Davis dismissed fan opinions about fighting Paul instead of Roach, stating he prioritized his career over fleeting public sentiment and urged fans to enjoy the sport. The fight was scheduled to take place at 195 pounds. Davis showed growing disengagement from boxing. He perceived the exhibition as a standard financial opportunity for fighters approaching retirement. He indicated plans to retire from boxing after the exhibition, remarking that "boxing is dead" and criticizing the sport's absence of loyalty. During the press tour, Davis distanced himself from the designation of "face of boxing" but did not publicly affirm his retirement plans.

Two weeks prior to the fight, Davis was mentioned in a civil lawsuit that accused him of violent behavior, battery, and kidnapping. There were concerns that this situation could affect the scheduled fight. Promoters and stakeholders expressed serious apprehensions, prompting discussions about potential changes to the event. One consideration was that Netflix might withdraw as the broadcaster in light of the allegations. Alternatives included either postponing the event or securing a substitute opponent. On November 4, Most Valuable Promotions and Netflix announced the cancellation of the card. Paul publicly criticized Davis on the X platform, calling him unprofessional. Nakisa Bidarian mentioned that there were still plans for Paul to headline a Netflix event in 2025. On November 17, MVP announced that Paul would instead fight Anthony Joshua on December 19. Paul lost via knockout in the sixth round.

== Boxing style ==
Davis fights out of a southpaw stance. He is known for his knockout power and high ring IQ. Davis uses the jab for distance control and pivots for positioning. Gervonta uses slips and shoulder rolls to evade punches, and feints to set up counters. He uses a long guard to control distance, block his opponents vision, and hand trap. He uses footwork to avoid punches. Davis is known for attacking the body to lower his opponent's guard to set up head shots.

== Personal life ==
On August 21, 2021, Davis was on board a Gulfstream 4 that suffered a nosewheel collapse and subsequently skidded off the runway at Fort Lauderdale Executive Airport. He and the thirteen others on board sustained no injuries.

On December 24, 2023, Davis converted to Islam and adopted the Muslim name Abdul Wahid.

He has three children: his first daughter with ex-girlfriend Andretta Smothers, and his second daughter and first son from his relationship with Vanessa Posso.

== Legal issues ==
On September 19, 2017, an arrest warrant was issued for Davis, who was being accused of first-degree aggravated assault. According to Maryland court records, the alleged incident took place on August 1, 2017, but did not indicate who was involved or what happened. An amount of $100,000 unsecured bond was posted for Davis' release. Davis was due to appear in court on October 19. The charge was later changed to misdemeanor second-degree assault, which carries a maximum potential sentence of 10 years or a fine of $2,500 or both. At the court, Anthony Wheeler, a childhood friend, complained that Davis punched him on the side of the head with a "gloved fist". He then stated he was diagnosed with a concussion at the hospital. The incident took place at the Upton Boxing Center in West Baltimore. It was said that Davis would stand trial on November 29, 2017. On that day, the charges were dropped by Wheeler. The Baltimore Sun stated that Davis and Wheeler both embraced and walked out of the courtroom together.

On September 14, 2018, Davis was arrested in Washington, D.C. According to a police report, he and another man started a fist fight. Punches were being landed around the upper body. It was said that someone had tried to break up the fight and both men tried to flee before the police arrived.

On February 1, 2020, Davis was arrested on charges of simple battery/domestic violence against his former girlfriend. The incident occurred at the Watsco Center at the University of Miami during a basketball game where he was seen grabbing the woman's shirt "with his right hand close to her throat" and dragged her to a separate room. In May 2026, an arrest warrant was reported to have been issued in Maryland for Davis, stemming from an alleged violation of probation related to a 2020 hit-and-run case in Baltimore. The original incident had resulted in multiple injuries and led to Davis being placed under court supervision. The alleged probation violation arose after Davis was involved in a separate incident in Florida involving a former partner. A Maryland judge subsequently reviewed the Florida case and determined that the conduct constituted a breach of the terms of his probation.

On March 22, 2021, he was indicted on fourteen counts for allegedly causing a serious car crash after running a red light after a November 2020 birthday party in Downtown Baltimore. His Lamborghini Urus struck another car and left it smoking, sending its four occupants to the hospital, including a pregnant woman. He allegedly left the scene in a Camaro that pulled up minutes later. On February 16, Davis accepted a plea deal that saw him plead guilty to leaving the scene of an accident involving bodily injury, failing to notify an owner of property damage, driving on a suspended license and running a red light. He was sentenced on May 5, 2023, to 90 days house arrest and 3 years probation. On June 1, 2023, Davis was taken into custody for violating the terms of his home detention, and sentenced to serve the remainder of his sentence in jail. 44 days later, on July 14, 2023, Davis completed the confinement portion of his sentence and was released from a Baltimore jail.

On December 27, 2022, days before he was due to fight Héctor García, Davis was arrested and jailed in Florida on a charge of battery domestic violence. In the audio from 911 calls, a woman was heard begging police for help and saying "he's going to kill me." Police observed an abrasion on the inside of the woman's lip, with Davis accused of striking her with a "closed hand type slap." The woman eventually recanted her accusation, and the Héctor García bout pushed through.

On July 11, 2025, Davis was taken into custody in Miami Beach following an arrest on a battery charge. This comes approximately a month after he was accused of assaulting his ex-girlfriend. According to police reports, the alleged incident took place outside the victim's residence on Father's Day, June 15. According to the report, Davis arrived at the victim's residence to collect their children when a verbal dispute escalated into a physical confrontation. Davis allegedly instructed the victim to remove the children from his car, asserting that he would no longer be responsible for their transportation. As his ex-girlfriend attempted to get the children out of the vehicle, he reportedly struck her on the back of the head and slapped her, causing a small cut inside her lip. He was booked at 3:35 am at Turner Guilford Knight Correctional Center. He was released later that day on $10,000 bond. On August 12, 2025, it was announced that the domestic violence case against him had been dropped as the victim was declining to prosecute.

On October 31, 2025, it was reported that Davis was involved in a civil lawsuit filed by his former girlfriend, Courtney Rossel. She claimed multiple instances of violence, including battery and kidnapping. The lawsuit stated that an incident occurred on October 27, during which Davis reportedly assaulted Rossel, resulting in police involvement. It alleged he “choked her, threatened to kill her, and assaulted her both in private and in public settings.” The complaint sought damages instead of criminal prosecution. On January 14, 2026, the Miami Gardens Police Department issued an arrest warrant for Davis which was based on the alleged October 27, 2025 incident with Davis. Due to video surveillance evidence that allegedly supported Rossel’s account of what happened, Davis was facing charges of battery, false imprisonment, and attempted kidnapping. Davis would be arrested following a two week search on January 28, 2026, and released later that day on a $16,000 bond. On March 27, 2026, TMZ reported that the felony false imprisonment charge was dismissed by authorities as it was deemed redundant; however, the felony kidnapping charge remained active. On March 23, Davis filed a countersuit seeking damages exceeding $20 million. The suit alleged that Rossel provoked a confrontation as part of a scheme to frame and extort Davis. It also claimed that Rossel knew about Davis' lucrative fight against Jake Paul, which was expected to generate over $20 million. It alleged that, via her lawyer, Rossel demanded $1.1 million from Ravone Littlejohn, Davis' manager, threatening criminal and civil legal action. On November 6, 2026, Davis settled the lawsuit. The terms of the settlement were not disclosed as Rossel said they were "confidential". It was noted that the criminal charges, including attempted kidnapping, false imprisonment and battery, remained pending.

== Professional boxing record ==
31 fights	30 wins	0 losses
By knockout	28	0
By decision	2	0
Draws	1	

No.	Result	Record	Opponent	Type	Round, time	Date	Location	Notes
31	Draw	30–0–1	Lamont Roach Jr.	MD	12	Mar 1, 2025	Barclays Center, New York City, New York, U.S.	Retained WBA lightweight title
30	Win	30–0	Frank Martin	KO	8 (12), 1:29	Jun 15, 2024	MGM Grand Garden Arena, Paradise, Nevada, U.S.	Retained WBA lightweight title
29	Win	29–0	Ryan Garcia	KO	7 (12), 1:44	Apr 22, 2023	T-Mobile Arena, Paradise, Nevada, U.S.	
28	Win	28–0	Héctor García	RTD	9 (12), 0:13	Jan 7, 2023	Capital One Arena, Washington, D.C., U.S.	Retained WBA (Regular) lightweight title
27	Win	27–0	Rolando Romero	TKO	6 (12), 2:39	May 28, 2022	Barclays Center, New York City, New York, U.S.	Retained WBA (Regular) lightweight title
26	Win	26–0	Isaac Cruz	UD	12	Dec 5, 2021	Staples Center, Los Angeles, California	Retained WBA (Regular) lightweight title
25	Win	25–0	Mario Barrios	TKO	11 (12), 2:13	Jun 26, 2021	State Farm Arena, Atlanta, Georgia, U.S.	Won WBA (Regular) super lightweight title
24	Win	24–0	Léo Santa Cruz	KO	6 (12), 2:40	Oct 31, 2020	Alamodome, San Antonio, Texas, U.S.	Retained WBA (Regular) lightweight title; Won WBA (Super) super featherweight title
23	Win	23–0	Yuriorkis Gamboa	TKO	12 (12), 1:17	Dec 28, 2019	State Farm Arena, Atlanta, Georgia, U.S.	Won vacant WBA (Regular) lightweight title
22	Win	22–0	Ricardo Núñez	TKO	2 (12), 1:33	Jul 27, 2019	Royal Farms Arena, Baltimore, Maryland, U.S.	Retained WBA (Super) super featherweight title
21	Win	21–0	Hugo Ruiz	KO	1 (12), 2:59	Feb 9, 2019	Dignity Health Sports Park, Carson, California, U.S.	Retained WBA (Super) super featherweight title
20	Win	20–0	Jesús Cuellar	KO	3 (12), 2:45	Apr 21, 2018	Barclays Center, New York City, New York, U.S.	Won vacant WBA (Super) super featherweight title
19	Win	19–0	Francisco Fonseca	KO	8 (12), 0:39	Aug 26, 2017	T-Mobile Arena, Paradise, Nevada, U.S.	IBF super featherweight title at stake only for Fonseca after Davis missed weight
18	Win	18–0	Liam Walsh	KO	3 (12), 2:11	May 20, 2017	Copper Box Arena, London, England	Retained IBF super featherweight title
17	Win	17–0	José Pedraza	TKO	7 (12), 2:36	Jan 14, 2017	Barclays Center, New York City, U.S.	Won IBF super featherweight title
16	Win	16–0	Mario Antonio Macias	KO	1 (8), 0:41	Jun 3, 2016	Hard Rock Live, Hollywood, Florida, U.S.	
15	Win	15–0	Guillermo Avila	TKO	6 (10), 0:29	Apr 1, 2016	D.C. Armory, Washington, D.C., U.S.	
14	Win	14–0	Luis Sanchez	KO	9 (10), 2:05	Dec 18, 2015	Pearl Concert Theater, Paradise, Nevada, U.S.	
13	Win	13–0	Cristóbal Cruz	TKO	3 (8), 1:31	Oct 30, 2015	The Venue at UCF, Orlando, Florida, U.S.	
12	Win	12–0	Recky Dulay	TKO	1 (6), 1:34	Sep 12, 2015	MGM Grand Garden Arena, Paradise, Nevada, U.S.	
11	Win	11–0	Alberto Mora	TKO	1 (8), 1:14	May 22, 2015	The Claridge Hotel, Atlantic City, New Jersey, U.S.	
10	Win	10–0	Israel Suarez	KO	1 (6), 0:47	Feb 20, 2015	Consol Energy Center, Pittsburgh, Pennsylvania, U.S.	
9	Win	9–0	Germán Meraz	UD	6	Oct 8, 2014	Beau Rivage, Biloxi, Mississippi, U.S.	
8	Win	8–0	Hector Lopez	KO	1 (4), 1:16	Aug 1, 2014	Little Creek Casino Resort, Shelton, Washington, U.S.	
7	Win	7–0	Joshua Arocho	TKO	2 (4), 3:00	May 16, 2014	Foxwoods Resort Casino, Ledyard, Connecticut, U.S.	
6	Win	6–0	James Franks	TKO	2 (6), 2:29	Dec 14, 2013	Convention Center, Washington, D.C., U.S.	
5	Win	5–0	Eric Jamar Goodall	TKO	4 (4), 1:55	Oct 17, 2013	ArtsQuest Center at SteelStacks, Bethlehem, Pennsylvania, U.S.	
4	Win	4–0	Rafael Casias	TKO	2 (6), 2:26	Jul 20, 2013	Physical Education Complex, Baltimore, Maryland, U.S.	
3	Win	3–0	Jonathan Gears	KO	1 (4), 1:36	Jun 8, 2013	Echostage, Washington, D.C., U.S.	
2	Win	2–0	Jacob Ninow	TKO	2 (4), 2:04	Apr 20, 2013	The Show Place Arena, Upper Marlboro, Maryland, U.S.	
1	Win	1–0	Desi Williams	KO	1 (4), 1:29	Feb 22, 2013	D.C. Armory, Washington, D.C., U.S.	

== Titles in boxing ==
=== Major world titles ===
- WBA (Super) super featherweight champion (130 lbs) (2×)
- IBF super featherweight champion (130 lbs)
- WBA lightweight champion (135 lbs)

=== Secondary major world titles (Note: The secondary champion lineage lists the Regular or Unified champions while the primary champion is occupied.) ===
- WBA (Regular) lightweight champion (Note: Davis was secondary champion from December 28, 2018 – November 29, 2023 before being promoted to primary champion.) (135 lbs)
- WBA (Regular) light welterweight champion (Note: Davis was secondary champion from June 26 – December 7, 2021, but was never recognized as the primary champion.) (140 lbs)

=== Honorary titles ===
- WBA lightweight Champion in Recess

== Pay-per-view bouts ==
United States
No.	Date	Fight	Buys	Network	Revenue
1	October 31, 2020	Davis vs. Santa Cruz	225,000	Showtime	$16,872,750
2	June 26, 2021	Davis vs. Barrios	210,000	Showtime	$15,747,900
3	December 5, 2021	Davis vs. Cruz	200,000	Showtime	$14,990,000
4	May 28, 2022	Davis vs. Romero	275,000	Showtime	$20,622,250
5	January 7, 2023	Davis vs. H García	220,000	Showtime	$16,497,800
6	April 22, 2023	Davis vs. R Garcia	1,200,000	Showtime/DAZN	$87,000,000
7	June 15, 2024	Davis vs. Martin	350,000	Amazon Prime Video	$26,232,500
8	March 1, 2025	Davis vs. Roach	262,000	Amazon Prime Video	$21,000,000
	Total sales		2,942,000		$218,963,200

== See also ==
- List of boxing triple champions
- List of world super-featherweight boxing champions
- List of world lightweight boxing champions
- List of world light-welterweight boxing champions
- List of WBA world champions
- List of IBF world champions

== Notes and references ==
=== References ===
Sporting positions
Amateur boxing titles
Previous: Tramaine Williams	U.S. Golden Gloves bantamweight champion 2012	Next: Gary Antonio Russell
World boxing titles
Preceded by José Pedraza	IBF super featherweight champion January 14, 2017 – August 25, 2017; Stripped	Vacant Title next held by Tevin Farmer
Vacant Title last held by Jezreel Corrales	WBA super featherweight champion Super title April 21, 2018 – September 1, 2019; Vacated	Vacant Title next held by Léo Santa Cruz
Vacant Title last held by Brandon Ríos	WBA lightweight champion Regular title December 28, 2019 – November 29, 2023; Promoted	Vacant
Preceded by Léo Santa Cruz	WBA super featherweight champion Super title October 31, 2020 – August 28, 2021; Vacated	Vacant Title next held by Anthony Cacace
Preceded by Mario Barrios	WBA super lightweight champion Regular title June 26, 2021 – December 7, 2021; Vacated	Vacant
Vacant Title last held by Jorge Linares	WBA lightweight champion November 29, 2023 – January 16, 2026; Status changed	Vacant Title next held by Himself
Vacant Title last held by Himself	WBA lightweight champion March 25 – June 26, 2026; Status changed	Vacant Title next held by Floyd Schofield
Honorary boxing titles
Vacant Title last held by Richar Abril	WBA lightweight champion Champion in recess January 16 – March 25, 2026; Reinstated	Vacant
Vacant Title last held by Himself	WBA lightweight champion Champion in recess June 26, 2026 – present	Incumbent
