= Kenny Lally =

Canadian boxer (born 1989)

Personal information
- Born: 23 June 1989 (age 37) Prince George, British Columbia, Canada

Sport
- Sport: Boxing
Medal record
Representing Canada
Pan American Games
Bronze medal – third place	2015 Toronto	Bantamweight

Kenny Lally (born June 23, 1989) is a Canadian amateur boxer from Prince George, British Columbia. He won a bronze medal in the men's bantamweight category at the 2015 Pan American Games and a silver medal at the 2010 Continental Championships.

Lally is of Indian Punjabi Sikh descent.
