= Boxing at the 2015 Pan American Games – Men's bantamweight =

Men's Bantamweight at the 2015 Pan American Games
- Venue: Oshawa Sports Centre
- Dates: July 18–24
- Competitors: 10 from 10 nations

Medalists
Gold medal	Andy Cruz Gomez	Cuba
Silver medal	Héctor García	Dominican Republic
Bronze medal	Kenny Lally	Canada
Bronze medal	Francisco Martinez	United States

The bantamweight competition of the boxing events at the 2015 Pan American Games in Toronto, Ontario, Canada, was held between the 18 and 24 of July at the Oshawa Sports Centre. The defending champion is Lazaro Alvarez of Cuba. Bantamweights is limited to those boxers weighing less than or equal to 56 kilograms.

Like all Pan American boxing events, the competition is a straight single-elimination tournament. Both semifinal losers are awarded bronze medals, so no boxers compete again after their first loss. Bouts consist of a 3 rounds "10-point must" scoring system used in the pro game, where the winner of each round must be awarded 10 points and the loser a lesser amount, and the elimination of the padded headgear. Five judges scored each bout. The winner will be the boxer who scored the most at the end of the match.

== Qualification ==
A total of ten boxers qualified to compete.

== Results ==
=== Bracket ===
Preliminaries; July 18, 2015
Carlos Andre Dos Santos (BRA)	2
Juan Reyes (GUA)	1
Jose Diaz Azocar (VEN)	1
Jorvi Ferronan (PER)	2

Quarterfinals; July 20, 2015
Andy Cruz Gomez (CUB)	3
Carlos Andre Dos Santos (BRA)	0
Kenny Lally (CAN)	2
Segundo Padilla (ECU)	1
Franco Gutiérrez (NCA)	0
Héctor García (DOM)	3
Jorvi Ferronan (PER)
Francisco Martinez (USA)	TKO R2 1:47

Semifinals; July 22, 2015
Andy Cruz Gomez (CUB)	3
Kenny Lally (CAN)	0
Héctor García (DOM)	3
Francisco Martinez (USA)	0

Finals; July 24, 2015
Andy Cruz Gomez (CUB)	3
Héctor García (DOM)	0
