= Andrew Cancio =

Mexican-American boxer

Personal information
- Nickname: El Chango
- Born: October 21, 1988 (age 37) Blythe, California, U.S.
- Height: 5 ft 6 in (168 cm)
- Weight: Featherweight; Super featherweight

Boxing career
- Reach: 68 in (173 cm)
- Stance: Orthodox

Boxing record
- Total fights: 28
- Wins: 21
- Win by KO: 16
- Losses: 5
- Draws: 2

Andrew Anthony Cancio (born October 21, 1988) is an American professional boxer of Mexican descent who held the WBA (Regular) super featherweight title in 2019.

== Professional career ==
=== Cancio vs. Machado ===
Cancio turned pro in 2006 and had a record 19-4-2 before challenging and beating Puerto Rican boxer Alberto Machado for the WBA (Regular) super featherweight title.

=== Cancio vs. Machado II ===
The rematch against Machado was scheduled to take place in the summer of 2019. Machado was ranked #5 by the WBA at the time. On June 21 at the Fantasy Springs Resort Casino in Indio, California. Cancio retained his WBA title via third-round stoppage of Machado, landing a strong body shot to Machado's left side and causing him to go down.

=== Cancio vs. Alvarado ===
In his next fight, Cancio lost his belt to Rene Alvarado. Alvarado, ranked #1 by the WBA at super featherweight, dominated through most of the fight, before the referee decided to stop the fight after the end of the seventh round. Following his defeat, he was released by his promoter Golden Boy, but quickly signed a new contract with Top Rank.

== Professional boxing record ==
28 fights	21 wins	5 losses
By knockout	16	2
By decision	5	3
Draws	2	

No.	Result	Record	Opponent	Type	Round, time	Date	Location	Notes
28	Loss	21–5–2	Rene Alvarado	RTD	7 (12), 3:00	Nov 23, 2019	Fantasy Springs Resort Casino, Indio, California, U.S.	Lost WBA (Regular) super featherweight title
27	Win	21–4–2	Alberto Machado	KO	3 (12), 1:01	Jun 21, 2019	Fantasy Springs Resort Casino, Indio, California, U.S.	Retained WBA (Regular) super featherweight title
26	Win	20–4–2	Alberto Machado	KO	4 (12), 2:16	Feb 9, 2019	Fantasy Springs Resort Casino, Indio, California, U.S.	Won WBA (Regular) super featherweight title
25	Win	19–4–2	Dardan Zenunaj	UD	10	Aug 17, 2018	Fantasy Springs Resort Casino, Indio, California, U.S.	
24	Win	18–4–2	Aidar Sharibayev	TKO	10 (10), 0:43	Apr 12, 2018	Fantasy Springs Resort Casino, Indio, California, U.S.	Won vacant WBA Inter-Continental super featherweight title
23	Loss	17–4–2	Joseph Diaz	TKO	9 (10), 2:27	Sep 17, 2016	AT&T Stadium, Arlington, Texas, U.S.	For WBC-NABF featherweight title
22	Win	17–3–2	Hugo Cazares	KO	3 (10), 2:49	Mar 25, 2016	Fantasy Springs Resort Casino, Indio, California, U.S.	
21	Win	16–3–2	Rene Alvarado	KO	8 (10), 2:41	Dec 18, 2015	Fantasy Springs Resort Casino, Indio, California, U.S.	
20	Loss	15–3–2	Ronny Rios	UD	10	Apr 14, 2014	UIC Pavilion, Chicago, Illinois, U.S.	
19	Win	15–2–2	Jerry Belmontes	UD	10	Jul 27, 2013	AT&T Center, San Antonio, Texas, U.S.	
18	Loss	14–2–2	Roger Gonzalez	MD	10	Sep 29, 2012	Fantasy Springs Resort Casino, Indio, California, U.S.	
17	Win	14–1–2	Rocky Juarez	UD	10	Jun 02, 2012	Fantasy Springs Resort Casino, Indio, California, U.S.	
16	Win	13–1–2	Gerardo Zayas	UD	6	Mar 16, 2012	Fantasy Springs Resort Casino, Indio, California, U.S.	
15	Win	12–1–2	Fernando Carcamo	MD	8	Dec 2, 2011	Fantasy Springs Resort Casino, Indio, California, U.S.	
14	Win	11–1–2	Lowell Brownfield	KO	4 (6), 1:49	Aug 12, 2011	Fantasy Springs Resort Casino, Indio, California, U.S.	
13	Win	10–1–2	Michaelangelo Lynks	TKO	5 (6), 1:50	May 21, 2009	Sleep Train Arena, Sacramento, California, U.S.	
12	Win	9–1–2	Jaime Orrantia	KO	3 (4), 1:26	Feb 12, 2009	Four Points Sheraton Hotel, San Diego, California, U.S.	
11	Loss	8–1–2	Carlos Vinan	MD	6	Jul 5, 2008	Planet Hollywood Resort and Casino, Paradise, Nevada, U.S.	
10	Win	8–0–2	Noe Inzunza	KO	1 (6), 2:20	Nov 10, 2007	Fort McDowell Casino, Fountain Hills, Arizona, U.S.	
9	Win	7–0–2	Orlando Cobos	TKO	1 (4), 1:35	Oct 27, 2007	Centro de Espectáculos Promocasa, Mexicali, Mexico	
8	Win	6–0–2	Gilberto Luque	TKO	3 (4), 2:49	Feb 16, 2007	Celebrity Theatre, Phoenix, Arizona, U.S.	
7	Win	5–0–2	Ernesto Rivera	KO	2 (4)	Dec 15, 2006	Gimnasio de Mexicali, Mexicali, Mexico	
6	Draw	4–0–2	Freudis Rojas	PTS	4	Nov 20, 2006	DoubleTree Hotel, Ontario, California, U.S.	
5	Win	4–0–1	Manuel Castro	TKO	2 (4)	Aug 3, 2006	Plaza Gigante, Mexicali, Mexico	
4	Win	3–0–1	Javier Espinoza	TKO	1 (4)	May 25, 2006	Plaza del Sol, Mexicali, Mexico	
3	Win	2–0–1	Ivan Castro	KO	1 (4)	Apr 27, 2006	Mexicali, Mexico	
2	Win	1–0–1	Juan Carlos Aboyte	KO	1 (4)	Mar 30, 2006	El Dune, Mexicali, Mexico	
1	Draw	0–0–1	Juan Velazquez	PTS	4	Mar 23, 2006	Mexico	

== See also ==
- List of super-featherweight boxing champions

Sporting positions
World boxing titles
Preceded by Alberto Machado	WBA super featherweight champion Regular Title; February 9, 2019 – November 23, 2019	Succeeded by René Alvarado
