= Alberto Machado =

Puerto Rican boxer

Personal information
- Nickname: El Explosivo ("The Explosive Man")
- Nationality: Puerto Rican
- Born: Alberto Josué Machado Becerril; September 9, 1990 (age 36) Río Piedras, Puerto Rico
- Height: 5 ft 10 in (178 cm)
- Weight: Super featherweight; Lightweight

Boxing career
- Reach: 72 in (183 cm)
- Stance: Southpaw

Boxing record
- Total fights: 27
- Wins: 23
- Win by KO: 19
- Losses: 4

Alberto Josué Machado Becerril (born September 9, 1990) is a Puerto Rican professional boxer who held the World Boxing Association (WBA) super featherweight title from 2017 to 2018.

== Amateur career ==
Machado started boxing at 10, in Monte Hatillo, San Juan. Despite being right-handed, he's boxed as a southpaw ever since. Machado won several national competitions. Machado represented Puerto Rico at the 2008 AIBA Youth World Boxing Championships. He won two bouts before losing in the quarterfinals to Timacoy Williams. Machado took part in the 2012 American Boxing Olympic Qualification Tournament but failed to qualify for the 2012 Summer Olympics as he lost to Alberto Melián in the second round. He had about 168 fights as an amateur before turning pro at 22.

== Professional career ==
Machado won his first 8 fights before competing for the USNBC super featherweight title against fellow Puerto Rican prospect Alvin Torres. Machado would prove to be too much for Torres, winning by technical knockout in the second round. Between 2015 and 2016, Machado scored five consecutive first-round knockouts. Machado's second title would be the NABO super featherweight, for which he defeated Juan José Martínez by TKO in just one round. Machado unified North American titles against NABA super featherweight titlist, Carlos Morales. Morales was knocked down on the second round before losing a wide unanimous decision (99-90, 99-90, 98-91).

Machado challenged WBA (super) champion Jezreel Corrales on 21 October 2017. The fight headlined an HBO Boxing After Dark show. Corrales lost his title on the scales, coming in at 134 lb, 4 above the division's weight limit. Corrales started the fight dominating Machado with sharper boxing and better footwork. Machado was rocked by several punches early in the fight and he was dropped in round 5. However, Machado came out strong in round 6 and had Corrales badly hurt. Corrales resorted to holding and tackled Machado, with both fighters hit the canvas. From that point, the defending champion was unable to use his better technique to his advantage. One of his gloves touched the canvas during round 7 but the referee failed to score it a knockdown. In round 8, Machado landed a hard left hook that dropped Corrales. Corrales was unable to recover before he was counted out, giving Machado the win and the title. Machado dedicated the victory to the victims of Hurricane Maria in Puerto Rico. As Machado was interviewed by Max Kellerman, Corrales tried to interrupt and demand a rematch but he was brushed off.

== Professional boxing record ==
27 fights	23 wins	4 losses
By knockout	19	4
By decision	4	0

No.	Result	Record	Opponent	Type	Round, time	Date	Location	Notes
27	Loss	23–4	Steve Claggett	TKO	3 (10), 2:29	Jun 1, 2023	Montreal Casino, Montreal, Canada	For vacant WBC–NABF light welterweight title
26	Win	23–3	Jose Angulo	TKO	8 (10), 1:00	Dec 9, 2022	Coliseo Pedrin Zorilla, San Juan, Puerto Rico	Won vacant WBC FECARBOX light welterweight title
25	Loss	22–3	Angel Fierro	KO	6 (10), 0:47	Mar 18, 2021	Albergue Olímpico, Salinas, Puerto Rico	For vacant WBO–NABO lightweight title
24	Win	22–2	Luis Porozo	KO	2 (10), 2:59	Dec 13, 2019	Fantasy Springs Casino, Indio, California, U.S	
23	Loss	21–2	Andrew Cancio	KO	3 (12), 1:01	Jun 21, 2019	Fantasy Springs Casino, Indio, California, U.S.	For WBA (Regular) super featherweight title
22	Loss	21–1	Andrew Cancio	KO	4 (12), 2:16	Feb 9, 2019	Fantasy Springs Casino, Indio, California, U.S.	Lost WBA (Regular) super featherweight title
21	Win	21–0	Yuandale Evans	KO	1 (12), 2:25	Oct 27, 2018	Hulu Theater, New York City, New York, U.S.	Retained WBA (Regular) super featherweight title
20	Win	20–0	Rafael Mensah	UD	12	Jul 21, 2018	The Joint, Paradise, Nevada, U.S.	Retained WBA (Regular) super featherweight title
19	Win	19–0	Jezreel Corrales	KO	8 (12), 2:18	Oct 21, 2017	Turning Stone Resort Casino, Verona, New York, U.S.	Won vacant WBA super featherweight title
18	Win	18–0	Carlos Morales	UD	10	Aug 18, 2017	Complejo Ferial, Ponce, Puerto Rico	Retained WBO–NABO super featherweight title; Won WBA–NABA super featherweight title
17	Win	17–0	Juan José Martínez	TKO	1 (10), 2:27	Apr 1, 2017	Complejo Ferial, Ponce, Puerto Rico	Won vacant WBO–NABO super featherweight title
16	Win	16–0	Orlando Rizo	KO	2 (10), 2:38	Dec 10, 2016	Coliseo Cosme Beitia Salamo, Cataño, Puerto Rico	
15	Win	15–0	Yardley Armenta	KO	2 (8), 0:43	Aug 6, 2016	Coliseo Cosme Beitia Salamo, Cataño, Puerto Rico	
14	Win	14–0	Miguel Ángel Mendoza	TKO	1 (8), 2:20	Apr 23, 2016	Coliseo Roger L. Mendoza, Caguas, Puerto Rico	
13	Win	13–0	José Luis Araiza	KO	1 (8), 2:59	Feb 6, 2016	Coliseo Roger L. Mendoza, Caguas, Puerto Rico	
12	Win	12–0	Tyrone Luckey	TKO	1 (4), 2:44	Nov 21, 2015	Mandalay Bay Events Center, Paradise, Nevada, U.S.	
11	Win	11–0	Álvaro Ortiz	KO	1 (8), 1:31	Jun 27 2015	Palacio de los Deportes, Mayagüez, Puerto Rico	
10	Win	10–0	Jean Javier Sotelo	KO	1 (8), 2:19	Mar 14, 2015	Coliseo Roger L. Mendoza, Caguas, Puerto Rico	Retained WBC–USNBC super featherweight title
9	Win	9–0	Alvin Torres	TKO	2 (8), 2:25	Nov 1, 2014	Coliseo Héctor Solá Bezares, Caguas, Puerto Rico	Won vacant WBC–USNBC super featherweight title
8	Win	8–0	Eliezer Agosto	KO	4 (6), 1:54	Aug 16, 2014	Coliseo Héctor Solá Bezares, Caguas, Puerto Rico	
7	Win	7–0	Jesus Lule	KO	2 (6), 1:12	Apr 19, 2014	Bahia Shrine Temple, Orlando, Florida, U.S.	
6	Win	6–0	Nuwan Jayakody	TKO	2 (6), 1:34	Jan 25, 2014	Madison Square Garden Theater, New York, New York, U.S.	
5	Win	5–0	Jesus del Valle	UD	4	Oct 26, 2013	Coliseo Rafael G. Amalbert, Juncos, Puerto Rico	
4	Win	4–0	Andrew Moreno	KO	1 (4), 1:03	Aug 8, 2013	Frontier Field, Rochester, New York, U.S.	
3	Win	3–0	Luis Quezada	UD	4	Apr 27, 2013	Coliseo Roger L. Mendoza, Caguas, Puerto Rico	
2	Win	2–0	Efrain Salgado	TKO	1 (4), 2:19	Feb 23, 2013	Coliseo Cosme Beitia Salamo, Cataño, Puerto Rico	
1	Win	1–0	Alex Nazario	TKO	3 (4), 2:59	Nov 17, 2012	Coliseo Roger L. Mendoza, Caguas, Puerto Rico	

== See also ==
- List of Puerto Rican boxing world champions
- List of super featherweight boxing champions

Sporting positions
World boxing titles
Vacant Title last held by Jezreel Corrales as Super champion	WBA super featherweight champion October 21, 2017 – April 21, 2018; Relegated to Regular champion	Vacant Title next held by Gervonta Davis as Super champion
Vacant Title last held by Jason Sosa	WBA super featherweight champion Regular Title; April 21, 2018 – February 9, 2019	Succeeded by Andrew Cancio
