= Héctor García (Dominican Republic boxer) =

Dominican boxer (born 1991)

Hector Luis Garcia
Personal information
- Nickname: El Androide ("The Android")
- Born: Hector Luis García Mora; 1 November 1991 (age 34) San Juan de la Maguana, Dominican Republic
- Height: 5 ft 8 in (173 cm)
- Weight: Featherweight; Super featherweight; Lightweight

Boxing career
- Reach: 69 in (175 cm)
- Stance: Southpaw

Boxing record
- Total fights: 21
- Wins: 16
- Win by KO: 10
- Losses: 2
- No contests: 3
Medal record
Boxing
Representing Dominican Republic
Pan American Games
Silver medal – second place	2015 Toronto	Bantamweight

Hector Luis García Mora (born 1 November 1991) is a Dominican former professional boxer. He held the WBA super featherweight title between 2022 and November 2023.

He competed at the 2016 Summer Olympics in the men's bantamweight event, in which he was eliminated in the round of 32 by Dzmitry Asanau.

== Professional boxing career ==
=== Early career ===
Garcia made his professional debut against Marlembron Acuna on 16 December 2016. He won the fight by a third-round stoppage. Garcia made his first step up in competition on 10 November 2018, when he was booked to face Robin Zamora for the vacant WBA Fedelatin featherweight title. He won the fight by a second-round knockout. Garcia made his first WBA Fedelatin featherweight title defense against Anvar Yunusov on 27 July 2019. He won the fight by split decision, with scores of 105–103, 107–101 and 102–106.

Following a pair of victories against Miguel Moreno Gonzalez and Isaac Avelar, Garcia was booked to face Chris Colbert on 26 February 2022, in a WBA super featherweight title eliminator, as a late replacement for Roger Gutiérrez who withdrew as he tested positive for COVID-19. Coming in with only 19 days notice, Garcia, who was a +1500 underdog, won the fight by an upset unanimous decision, knocking Colbert down in the seventh round and winning a unanimous decision with judges' scorecards of 119–108 and 118–109 twice.

=== WBA super featherweight champion ===
==== García vs. Gutiérrez ====
García was expected to challenge the reigning WBA super featherweight champion Roger Gutiérrez on July 10, 2022, at the Poliedro de Caracas in Caracas, Venezuela. The fight was later postponed, as the promoters were unable to organize a bout in Venezuela. The WBA ordered both sides to renegotiate terms to avoid the fight heading to a purse bid hearing. The pair came to terms and rescheduled the fight for August 20. The bout took place on the Adrien Broner and Omar Figueroa Jr. undercard. García fought behind his jab for the first eight rounds of the bout, which kept his opponent relatively inactive. Although Gutiérrez picked up the pace in the ninth round, García had already built up a significant lead and won the fight by unanimous decision. Two judges scored the fight 117–111 in his favor, while the third judge scored the fight 118–110 for García.

==== García vs. Davis ====
García faced three weight world champion Gervonta Davis in a lightweight bout at the Capital One Arena in Washington, D.C., on January 7, 2023. The fight was a closely-contested affair, until Davis landed a flush straight left early in the eighth round. Soon after, a fight broke out in the crowd at ringside with 2 minutes and 8 seconds left in the eighth round, causing the fight to be temporarily halted. When the action was resumed, Davis found success again with his left hand, visibly hurting García. The latter was disoriented after retreating to his stool in his corner, complaining about his eyesight. The fight was stopped, with Davis winning via eighth-round corner retirement, marking the first loss of Garcia's career.

==== García vs. Roach ====
On March 20, 2023, the WBA ordered García to enter negotiations to defend his world title against Lamont Roach Jr. (23–1–1, 9 KOs) before May 20. Purse bids were scheduled for May 25, which was won by TGB Promotions on behalf of Premier Boxing Champions, which meant the fight was likely to be broadcast on Showtime. The winning bid was $410,000. The only other bidder was NoXcuse Boxing, led by Roach's father Lamont Roach Sr., with a bid of $351,000. A per WBA purse splits, García was entitled to 75%, which equated to $307,500, with Roach taking the remaining $102,500 purse.

Speaking ahead of the fight, Roach said, “I wanna make him quit. Even if I don’t sleep him, I wanna make him quit. I want him to be like ‘alright, I don’t wanna to do this anymore.” This was a reference to García's fight against Davis, in which he quit on his stool after eight rounds. On November 1, it was announced that the fight would take place on the David Benavidez-Demetrius Andrade undercard November 25, 2023 at the Michelob ULTRA Arena in Las Vegas. García was happy to be fighting back at his natural weight, stating he had a good training camp. He also acknowledged Roach as a tough opponent. García was a 4-1 favorite heading into the fight. The weigh in took place behind closed doors. García was 129.4 pounds and Roach came in at 129.6 pounds.

In a closely contested, technical fight, Roach won via split decision, becoming the new WBA champion. The fight started off slow with García landing effective counters. Roach gained momentum in the later rounds, hurting García in the eleventh and dropping him in the final round with a left hook, with only 1:20 left of the round. One judges scored the bout 114–113 for García, but was overruled by the remaining judges who scored it 116–111, 114–113 for Roach. Roach landed 118 of 490 punches thrown (29%) with 79 power shots and García landed 93 of 468 (20%), landing 62 power shots. Following the win, Roach said, “Man, I’ve been waiting to hear ‘And the new’ for a long time. It's about time though. All I needed was the spotlight. The first time I was a baby – I was 24 years old. Now I'm seasoned. I don't think anyone can beat me. Nobody.” Roach offered an open challenge to the other champions at the weight for a unification. García and his team were displeased with the outcome due to the controversial knockdown, claiming it was an illegal punch. His trainer Bob Santos was hoping the WBA would call for an immediate rematch.

=== Retirement ===
In August 2025, Garcia announced his retirement from boxing via social media. He concluded his career with a record of 16 wins, 2 losses, and 10 knockouts.

== Professional boxing record ==
21 fights	16 wins	2 losses
By knockout	10	1
By decision	6	1
No contests	3	

No.	Result	Record	Opponent	Type	Round, time	Date	Location	Notes
21	Loss	16–2 (3)	Lamont Roach Jr.	SD	12	25 Nov 2023	Michelob Ultra Arena, Paradise, Nevada, U.S.	Lost WBA super featherweight title
20	Loss	16–1 (3)	Gervonta Davis	RTD	9 (12), 0:13	7 Jan 2023	Capital One Arena, Washington, D.C., U.S.	For WBA (Regular) lightweight title
19	Win	16–0 (3)	Roger Gutiérrez	UD	12	20 Aug 2022	Hard Rock Hotel & Casino, Hollywood, Florida, U.S.	Won WBA super featherweight title
18	Win	15–0 (3)	Chris Colbert	UD	12	26 Feb 2022	The Cosmopolitan, Paradise, Nevada, U.S.	Won vacant WBA Gold super featherweight title
17	Win	14–0 (3)	Isaac Avelar	UD	8	18 Dec 2021	Armory, Minneapolis, Minnesota, U.S.	
16	Win	13–0 (3)	Miguel Moreno Gonzalez	TKO	4 (8), 0:57	21 Jul 2021	Pabellon de Boleibol, Santo Domingo, Dominican Republic	
15	NC	12–0 (3)	Marco Acevedo	NC	3 (8)	16 Dec 2020	Hotel Catalonia Malecon Center, Santo Domingo, Dominican Republic	
14	Win	12–0 (2)	Anvar Yunusov	SD	11	27 Jul 2019	Coliseo Carlos 'Teo' Cruz, Santo Domingo, Dominican Republic	Retained WBA Fedelatin featherweight title
13	Win	11–0 (2)	Ronal Ron	RTD, 3:00	3 (8)	27 Apr 2019	Club el Millon, Santo Domingo, Dominican Republic	
12	NC	10–0 (2)	Charlie Serrano	NC	1 (10)	2 Mar 2019	USF Sundome, Tampa, Florida, U.S.	
11	Win	10–0 (1)	Robin Zamora	KO	2 (11)	10 Nov 2018	Hotel Jaragua, Santo Domingo, Dominican Republic	Won vacant WBA Fedelatin featherweight title
10	Win	9–0 (1)	Leonel Lugo	TKO	2 (8), 2:33	25 Aug 2018	Polideportivo Maria Auxiliadora, Santo Domingo, Dominican Republic	
9	Win	8–0 (1)	Antoni Armas	KO	1 (8), 0:57	16 Jul 2018	Hotel Jaragua, Santo Domingo, Dominican Republic	
8	Win	7–0 (1)	Rafael Hernandez	KO	6 (6), 1:45	23 Jun 2018	Club el Millon, Santo Domingo, Dominican Republic	
7	Win	6–0 (1)	Jose Luis Graterol	TKO	4 (6), 0:39	24 Feb 2018	Club Mauricio Baez, Santo Domingo, Dominican Republic	
6	Win	5–0 (1)	Manuel Gonzalez Garcia	TKO	2 (8), 1:31	22 Dec 2017	Los Prados Social Club, Santo Domingo, Dominican Republic	
5	NC	4–0 (1)	Alfonso Perez	NC	3 (8)	14 Sep 2017	Hotel Jaragua, Santo Domingo, Dominican Republic	
4	Win	4–0	Maikol Beaumont	UD	6	26 Jul 2017	Hotel Jaragua, Santo Domingo, Dominican Republic	
3	Win	3–0	Miguel Encarnacion	TKO	2 (6), 1:03	24 Jun 2017	Hotel Jaragua, Santo Domingo, Dominican Republic	
2	Win	2–0	Robinson Garcia	UD	6	24 Feb 2017	Maunoloa Night Club y Casino, Santo Domingo, Dominican Republic	
1	Win	1–0	Marlembron Acuna	RTD	3 (4), 3:00	16 Dec 2016	Maunoloa Night Club y Casino, Santo Domingo, Dominican Republic	

== See also ==
- List of southpaw stance boxers
- List of world super-featherweight boxing champions

Sporting positions
World boxing titles
Preceded by Roger Gutiérrez	WBA super featherweight champion August 20, 2022 – November 25, 2023	Succeeded by Lamont Roach Jr.
