= René Alvarado =

Nicaraguan boxer (b. 1989)

Personal information
- Nickname: Gemelo ("Twin")
- Born: René Antonio Alvarado Sánchez; 15 February 1989 (age 37) Managua, Nicaragua
- Height: 5 ft 7 in (170 cm)
- Weight: Super bantamweight; Featherweight; Super featherweight

Boxing career
- Reach: 72 in (183 cm)
- Stance: Orthodox

Boxing record
- Total fights: 53
- Wins: 36
- Win by KO: 22
- Losses: 17

René Antonio Alvarado Sánchez (born 15 February 1989) is a Nicaraguan professional boxer who held the WBA (Regular) super featherweight title from 2019 to January 2021.

== Professional career ==
Growing up, Alvarado was always a fan of boxing, specifically Oscar De La Hoya. Alvarado said that meeting De La Hoya and signing with Golden Boy Promotions was always a dream of his.

Alvarado turned professional on 2 May 2008, scoring a second-round knockout victory over Cristobal Ramos at the Casino Pharaohs in Managua, Nicaragua. He compiled a record of 31–8 (20 KO) before facing and defeating Andrew Cancio in a rematch to win the WBA (Regular) super featherweight title.

== Professional boxing record ==
53 fights	36 wins	17 losses
By knockout	22	2
By decision	14	15

No.	Result	Record	Opponent	Type	Round, time	Date	Location	Notes
53	Loss	36–17	Dominic Valle	UD	8	7 Nov 2025	RP Funding Center, Lakeland, Florida, U.S.	
52	Win	36–16	Elysson Marquez	TD	6 (8) 3:00	12 Sep 2025	Polideportivo Alexis Argüello, Managua, Nicaragua	Unanimous TD: Alvarado cut from an accidental head clash
51	Win	35–16	Victor Morales Jr.	UD	10	28 Jun 2025	Honda Center, Anaheim, California, U.S.	
50	Loss	34–16	Geo Lopez	UD	10	5 Apr 2025	2300 Arena, Philadelphia, Pennsylvania, U.S.	
49	Loss	34–15	Hayato Tsutsumi	TKO	8 (10), 1:55	31 Dec 2024	Ota City General Gymnasium, Tokyo, Japan	
48	Win	34–14	Ricardo Blandon	UD	10	31 Aug 2024	Gimnasio Nacional, Managua, Nicaragua	
47	Loss	33–14	Vildan Minasov	UD	10	8 Sep 2023	Traktor Ice Arena, Chelyabinsk, Russia	
46	Win	33–13	Ricardo Cortez	TKO	3 (10), 1:33	25 Mar 2023	Paseo Xolotlan, Managua, Nicaragua	
45	Loss	32–13	Mark Urvanov	UD	10	19 Nov 2022	RCC Boxing Academy, Ekaterinburg, Russia	
44	Loss	32–12	William Zepeda	UD	10	14 May 2022	Toyota Arena, Ontario, California, U.S.	
43	Loss	32–11	Lamont Roach Jr.	UD	10	18 Dec 2021	AT&T Center, San Antonio, Texas, U.S.	For vacant NABA super-featherweight title
42	Loss	32–10	Roger Gutiérrez	UD	12	14 Aug 2021	Ford Center at The Star, Frisco, Texas, U.S.	For WBA (Regular) super-featherweight title
41	Loss	32–9	Roger Gutiérrez	UD	12	2 Jan 2021	American Airlines Center, Dallas, Texas, U.S.	Lost WBA (Regular) super-featherweight title
40	Win	32–8	Andrew Cancio	RTD	7 (12), 3:00	23 Nov 2019	Fantasy Springs Resort Casino, Indio, California, U.S.	Won WBA (Regular) super-featherweight title
39	Win	31–8	Eusebio Osejo	TD	6 (8), 0:16	26 Apr 2019	Nuevo Gimnasio Nicarao, Managua, Nicaragua	Unanimous TD after Osejo cut from accidental head clash
38	Win	30–8	Carlos Morales	UD	12	8 Dec 2018	Fantasy Springs Resort Casino, Indio, California, U.S.	
37	Win	29–8	Luis Gonzalez	KO	1 (8), 2:24	23 Mar 2018	Nuevo Gimnasio Nicarao, Managua, Nicaragua	
36	Win	28–8	Denis Shafikov	SD	10	9 Dec 2017	Mandalay Bay Events Center, Paradise, Nevada, U.S.	
35	Win	27–8	David Morales	KO	2 (8), 1:20	14 Oct 2017	Puerto Salvador Allende, Managua, Nicaragua	
34	Win	26–8	Roger Gutiérrez	KO	7 (8), 1:33	14 Jul 2017	Belasco Theater, Los Angeles, California, U.S.	
33	Win	25–8	Moises Olivas	KO	2 (8), 0:50	26 May 2017	Gimnasio Rosendo Álvarez, Managua, Nicaragua	
32	Loss	24–8	Yuriorkis Gamboa	UD	10	11 Mar 2017	Turning Stone Resort Casino, Verona, New York, U.S.	
31	Win	24–7	Jayson Vélez	SD	10	15 Jul 2016	Fantasy Springs Resort Casino, Indio, California, U.S.	
30	Loss	23–7	Manuel Ávila	UD	10	1 Apr 2016	Belasco Theater, Los Angeles, California, U.S.	
29	Loss	23–6	Andrew Cancio	KO	8 (10), 2:41	18 Dec 2015	Fantasy Springs Resort Casino, Indio, California, U.S.	
28	Win	23–5	Eusebio Osejo	TKO	1 (10), 1:47	10 Oct 2015	Gimnasio Rosendo Álvarez, Managua, Nicaragua	
27	Loss	22–5	Joseph Diaz	UD	10	11 Jul 2015	Sports Arena, Los Angeles, California, U.S.	
26	Win	22–4	Rafael Castillo	TKO	3 (8), 1:07	21 Mar 2015	Escuela de Danza, Managua, Nicaragua	
25	Loss	21–4	Eric Hunter	UD	10	20 Jan 2015	2300 Arena, Philadelphia, Pennsylvania, U.S.	
24	Win	21–3	Juan Pablo Sanchez	UD	12	11 Oct 2014	Oasis Hotel Complex, Cancún, Mexico	Won WBC International super-featherweight title
23	Loss	20–3	Rocky Juarez	UD	12	26 May 2014	Fort Bliss Arena, El Paso, Texas, U.S.	Lost WBC Silver featherweight title
22	Win	20–2	Robinson Castellanos	TKO	9 (12), 1:59	15 Feb 2014	C.I.C., Puerto Vallarta, Mexico	Won WBC Silver featherweight title
21	Win	19–2	Cristobal Ramos	RTD	3 (8), 3:00	25 Jan 2014	Parque John F. Kennedy, San Sebastián, Costa Rica	
20	Win	18–2	Ariel Vasquez	KO	1 (8), 2:50	15 Mar 2013	Pharaoh's Casino, Managua, Nicaragua	
19	Loss	17–2	Jezreel Corrales	UD	6	24 Jan 2013	Hotel RIU, Panama City, Panama	
18	Win	17–1	Eusebio Osejo	RTD	6 (10), 3:00	15 Dec 2012	Gimnasio Alexis Argüello, Managua, Nicaragua	
17	Win	16–1	Jose Gutierrez	TKO	3 (8), 1:32	13 Jul 2012	Hotel Holiday Inn, Managua, Nicaragua	
16	Win	15–1	Roberto Rodriguez Corea	UD	8	31 Mar 2012	Casino Princess, Managua, Nicaragua	
15	Loss	14–1	Orlando Rizo	SD	10	24 Sep 2011	Gimnasio Alexis Argüello, Managua, Nicaragua	Lost Nicaraguan super-bantamweight title
14	Win	14–0	Erick Aguilera	TKO	2 (6), 2:00	26 Aug 2011	Gimnasio Multiusos del IND, Managua, Nicaragua	
13	Win	13–0	Bismarck Alfaro	KO	2 (10), 1:41	5 Feb 2011	Casino La Perla, León, Nicaragua	
12	Win	12–0	Bismarck Alfaro	TKO	3 (6), 1:30	11 Dec 2010	Gimnasio Alexis Argüello, Managua, Nicaragua	
11	Win	11–0	Imer Velasquez	UD	6	23 Oct 2010	Gimnasio Alexis Argüello, Managua, Nicaragua	
10	Win	10–0	Reynaldo Cajina	TKO	5 (6), 2:06	28 Aug 2010	Gimnasio Alexis Argüello, Managua, Nicaragua	
9	Win	9–0	Orlando Rizo	MD	10	26 Jun 2010	Gimnasio Alexis Argüello, Managua, Nicaragua	Won vacant Nicaraguan super-bantamweight title
8	Win	8–0	Adonis Rivas	UD	8	12 Mar 2010	Gimnasio Alexis Argüello, Managua, Nicaragua	
7	Win	7–0	Jose Rizo	UD	6	6 Jun 2009	Polideportivo Espana, Managua, Nicaragua	
6	Win	6–0	Jose Rizo	UD	6	14 Mar 2009	Gimnasio Alexis Argüello, Managua, Nicaragua	
5	Win	5–0	Heyner Aragon	KO	1 (4), 1:45	4 Oct 2008	Gimnasio Alexis Argüello, Managua, Nicaragua	
4	Win	4–0	Nicolas Mercado	KO	1 (4), 2:36	12 Sep 2008	Centro Comercial Las Américas, Managua, Nicaragua	
3	Win	3–0	Francisco Castillo	KO	1 (4), 0:55	12 Jul 2008	Universidad de Managua, Managua, Nicaragua	
2	Win	2–0	Heyner Aragon	KO	2 (4), 2:00	20 Jun 2008	Gimnasio Alexis Argüello, Managua, Nicaragua	
1	Win	1–0	Cristobal Ramos	KO	2 (4), 2:59	2 May 2008	Pharaoh's Casino, Managua, Nicaragua	

== Personal life ==
Outside of boxing, Alvarado enjoys playing soccer, spending time with his family, and watching movies.

René has a twin brother, Felix Alvarado, who previously held the IBF light flyweight title.

== See also ==
- List of male boxers
- Notable boxing families
- List of world super-featherweight boxing champions

Sporting positions
Regional boxing titles
Vacant Title last held by Eusebio Osejo	Nicaraguan super-bantamweight champion 26 June 2010 – 24 September 2011	Succeeded by Orlando Rizo
Preceded by Robinson Castellanos	WBC Silver featherweight champion 15 February 2014 – 26 May 2014	Succeeded by Rocky Juarez
Preceded by Juan Pablo Sánchez	WBC International super-featherweight champion 11 October 2014 – 2015; Vacated	Vacant Title next held by Eden Sonsona
World boxing titles
Preceded by Andrew Cancio	WBA super-featherweight champion Regular title 23 November 2019 – 2 January 2021	Succeeded by Roger Gutiérrez
