= Roger Gutiérrez =

Venezuelan boxer

Personal information
- Nickname: The Kid
- Born: Roger Andrés Gutiérrez Cuevas; April 11, 1995 (age 31) Maracaibo, Venezuela
- Height: 5 ft 8 in (173 cm)
- Weight: Super featherweight; Lightweight

Boxing career
- Reach: 69 1/2 in (177 cm)
- Stance: Orthodox

Boxing record
- Total fights: 38
- Wins: 29
- Win by KO: 22
- Losses: 8
- Draws: 1

Roger Andrés Gutiérrez Cuevas (born April 11, 1995) is a Venezuelan professional boxer who held the WBA super featherweight title from 2021 to 2022.

== Professional career ==
=== Early career ===
Gutiérrez made his professional debut against Alexander Ponce on October 19, 2013. He won the fight by unanimous decision. Gutiérrez amassed a 20-3–1 record during the next five years, before winning his first step-up fight against Leonardo Padilla on December 20, 2018, whom he beat by a fifth-round knockout. Gutiérrez next beat the undefeated Eduardo Hernandez by a first-round knockout on July 13, 2019. Gutiérrez faced Andres Tapia on December 14, 2019, in his final fight before challenging for a world title. He won the bout by unanimous decision.

=== WBA Regular super featherweight champion ===
==== Gutiérrez vs. Alvardo II ====
On November 5, 2020, the WBA announced that their reigning super featherweight champion René Alvarado would make his first title defense against Gutiérrez. The fight was scheduled for the undercard of the Ryan Garcia and Luke Campbell interim lightweight WBC title bout, which took place on 2 January 2022, at the American Airlines Center in Dallas, United States. The pair previously fought on July 14, 2017, with Alvardo winning by a seventh-round knockout. Despite Alvardo entering the bout as a -300 favorite to retain, Gutiérrez won the fight by an upset unanimous decision, with all three judges awarding him a 113–112 scorecard. Although Alvardo was able to outbox for the majority of the rounds, Gutiérrez manage to knock the champion on three occasions, which allowed to narrowly edge him out. He first knocked Alvardo down with a right uppercut and a right straight in the third round, while the third knockdown occurred in the twelfth round, when he knocked Alvardo down with a short left hook.

==== Gutiérrez vs. Alvardo III ====
Gutiérrez was booked to face René Alvarado in his first title defense. Their rubber match was scheduled for the undercard of the Vergil Ortiz Jr. and Egidijus Kavaliauskas WBO International welterweight title bout, which took place on August 14, 2021, at the Ford Center at The Star in Frisco, Texas and was broadcast by DAZN. Despite his victory against Alvardo seven months prior, Gutiérrez once again entered the fight as an underdog, with most odds-makers having Gutiérrez at +115. He won the fight by unanimous decision. Two judges scored the fight 116–112 in his favor, while the third judge scored it 115–113 for him.

==== Gutiérrez vs. Garcia ====
On August 15, 2021, the WBA ordered Gutiérrez to make his second title defense against the interim WBA champion Chris Colbert, giving the pair until September 15 to come to terms. On October 25, 2021, it was revealed that Gutiérrez and Colbert had come to terms to face each other on February 19, 2022, on a Showtime broadcast card. The fight was officially announced on January 24, 2022, as the main event of February 26 PBC card, which will take place at The Cosmopolitan in Las Vegas, Nevada. Gutiérrez withdrew from the bout on February 10, after both he and several members of his team tested positive for COVID-19.

Gutiérrez was instead scheduled to face the mandatory WBA title challenger Héctor García in his second title defense, who had earned the mandatory position with a unanimous decision victory over Colbert. The bout was expected to place at the Poliedro de Caracas in Caracas, Venezuela on July 10, 2022, and was to be broadcast on the WBA's YouTube channel. The fight was later postponed, as the promoters were unable to organize a bout in Venezuela. Accordingly, ordered both sides to renegotiate terms to avoid the fight heading to a purse bid hearing. The bout was rescheduled for August 20, and took place on the Adrien Broner and Omar Figueroa Jr. undercard. Gutiérrez remained inactive throughout the first eight rounds of the bout, which let his opponent build an early lead, and although Gutiérrez picked up the pace from the ninth round onward, he nonetheless lost the fight by unanimous decision, with two scorecards of 117–111 and one scorecard of 118–110.

== Professional boxing record ==
38 fights	29 wins	8 losses
By knockout	22	4
By decision	7	4
Draws	1	

No.	Result	Record	Opponent	Type	Round, time	Date	Location	Notes
37	Loss	29–7–1	Lucas Bahdi	UD	12	Aug 23, 2025	Caribe Royale, Orlando, Florida, U.S.	
36	Win	29–6–1	Moises Flores	KO	2 (10), 2:55	Nov 15, 2024	Palacio de Eventos de Venezuela, Maracaibo, Venezuela	Won vacant WBA–NABA lightweight title
35	Win	28–6–1	Alan Ayala	UD	10	May 18, 2024	Palacio de Eventos de Venezuela, Maracaibo, Venezuela	Won vacant WBA Fedecentro lightweight title
34	Loss	27–6–1	Zaur Abdullaev	UD	10	Feb 10, 2024	KRK Uralets, Ekaterinburg, Russia	
33	Loss	27–5–1	Otar Eranosyan	RTD	8 (12), 3:00	Aug 9, 2023	Whitesands Events Center, Plant City, Florida, US	
32	Win	27–4–1	Henry Delgado	KO	2 (10), 1:46	Mar 3, 2023	Hotel Tibisay, Maracaibo, Venezuela	Won vacant WBA Fedelatin super featherweight title
31	Loss	26–4–1	Héctor García	UD	12	Aug 20, 2022	Hard Rock Hotel & Casino, Hollywood, Florida, U.S.	Lost WBA super featherweight title
30	Win	26–3–1	René Alvarado	UD	12	Aug 14, 2021	Ford Center at The Star, Frisco, Texas, U.S.	Retained WBA (Regular) super featherweight title
29	Win	25–3–1	René Alvarado	UD	12	Jan 2, 2021	American Airlines Center, Dallas, Texas, U.S.	Won WBA (Regular) super featherweight title
28	Win	24–3–1	Andres Tapia	UD	10	Dec 14, 2019	Auditorio del Estado, Mexicali, Mexico	
27	Win	23–3–1	Angel Mujica	TKO	3 (8), 0:52	Oct 19, 2019	Centro Recreacional Yesterday, Turmero, Venezuela	
26	Win	22–3–1	Eduardo Hernández	KO	1 (10), 2:39	Jul 13, 2019	Dignity Health Sports Park, Carson, California, U.S.	
25	Win	21–3–1	Leonardo Padilla	KO	5 (10), 2:13	Dec 20, 2018	Plaza de La Paz, Cartagena, Colombia	
24	Win	20–3–1	Eduardo Aguero	TKO	4 (6), 2:10	Nov 21, 2018	Gimnasio Mocho Navas, Petare, Venezuela	
23	Loss	19–3–1	Oscar Duarte	RTD	4 (8), 3:00	Sep 29, 2018	Fantasy Springs Casino, Indio, California, U.S.	
22	Loss	19–2–1	Hector Tanajara Jr.	UD	8	Jun 23, 2018	Belasco Theater, Los Angeles, California, U.S.	
21	Win	19–1–1	Willy Franklin Morillo	KO	1 (8), 2:47	May 24, 2018	Karibe Convention Center, Pétion-Ville, Haiti	
20	Win	18–1–1	Antonio Requena	KO	2 (8), 1:02	Feb 3, 2018	Centro Recreacional Yesterday, Turmero, Venezuela	
19	Win	17–1–1	Brayner Vazquez	KO	5 (8)	Oct 26, 2017	Karibe Convention Center, Pétion-Ville, Haiti	
18	Win	16–1–1	Juan Pina	TKO	2 (8), 2:40	Sep 9, 2017	Gimnasio Vertical El Dorado, Petare, Venezuela	
17	Loss	15–1–1	René Alvarado	KO	7 (8), 1:33	Jul 14, 2017	Belasco Theater, Los Angeles, California, U.S	
16	Win	15–0–1	Ciro Molero	TKO	2 (10), 1:45	Feb 11, 2017	Centro Recreacional Yesterday, Turmero, Venezuela	
15	Win	14–0–1	Alfredo Mirabal	TKO	1 (8), 2:44	Oct 1, 2016	Centro Recreacional Yesterday, Turmero, Venezuela	
14	Win	13–0–1	Moises Castro	TKO	1 (6), 2:09	Aug 16, 2016	Centro de Convenciones Vasco Núñez de Balboa (Hotel El Panama), Panama City, Panama	
13	Win	12–0–1	Denilson Herrera	KO	1 (8)	Apr 4, 2016	Jardín Terapeútico, Los Teques, Venezuela	
12	Win	11–0–1	Alexander Gonzalez	UD	8	Jan 30, 2016	Centro Recreacional Yesterday, Turmero, Venezuela	
11	Win	10–0–1	Gustavo Vera	TKO	2 (8), 1:16	Nov 14, 2015	Polideportivo Barrio Carmelo Urdaneta, Maracaibo, Venezuela	
10	Win	9–0–1	Luis Nino	TKO	2 (6), 2:07	Oct 10, 2015	El Poliedro, Caracas, Venezuela	
9	Win	8–0–1	Yohangel Romero	TKO	1 (6), 2:45	Aug 15, 2015	Centro Comercial Hyper Jumbo, Maracay, Venezuela	
8	Win	7–0–1	Christian Eduardo Gomez Garcia	TKO	6 (6), 0:25	Jun 27, 2015	Polideportivo José María Vargas, La Guaira, Venezuela	
7	Win	6–0–1	Miguel Urdaneta	TKO	2 (6), 2:46	May 30, 2015	Centro Recreacional Yesterday, Turmero, Venezuela	
6	Win	5–0–1	Daniel Caicedo	KO	1 (4), 1:59	Mar 7, 2015	Centro Recreacional Yesterday, Turmero, Venezuela	
5	Draw	4–0–1	Alfredo Mirabal	SD	4	Oct 11, 2014	Polideportivo de Corinsa, Cagua, Venezuela	
4	Win	4–0	Edgar Daniel Ahumada	UD	4	Aug 30, 2014	Parque Naciones Unidas, Caracas, Venezuela	
3	Win	3–0	Luis Nino	KO	1 (4)	May 5, 2013	Polideportivo José María Vargas, La Guaira, Venezuela	
2	Win	2–0	Jimzor Maytan	KO	3 (4), 2:05	Dec 14, 2013	Parque Naciones Unidas, Caracas, Venezuela	
1	Win	1–0	Alexander Ponce	UD	4	Oct 19, 2013	Parque Naciones Unidas, Caracas, Venezuela	

== See also ==
- List of world super-featherweight boxing champions

Sporting positions
World boxing titles
Preceded by René Alvarado	WBA super featherweight champion Regular title January 2, 2021 – August 28, 2021; Promoted	Title discontinued
Vacant Title last held by Gervonta Davis as Super champion	WBA super featherweight champion August 28, 2021 – August 20, 2022	Succeeded by Héctor García
