= Henderson Police Department =

Police department in Nevada

- Common name: Henderson Police
- Abbreviation: HPD

Agency overview
- Formed: 1953
- Preceding agency: Clark County Sheriff's Department

Jurisdictional structure
- Operations jurisdiction: Henderson, Nevada, United States
- Jurisdictional area shown within Clark County
- Area: 279.0
- Population: 302,539
- Legal jurisdiction: Henderson, Nevada

Operational structure
- Headquarters: 223 Lead St. Henderson, NV, 89015
- Police Officers: 350 (2009)
- Corrections and Civilians: 189 (2009)
- Elected officers responsible: Michelle Romero, Mayor; Richard Derrick, City Manager
- Agency executive: Reggie Rader, Chief of Police

Facilities
- Area Commands: 3
- Detention Centers: Henderson Detention Center 243 Water St

Website
- Henderson Police Department

The Henderson Police Department (HPD) is the police department of the City of Henderson in Clark County in southern Nevada. The department is accredited through the Commission on Accreditation for Law Enforcement Agencies (CALEA). It has 391 sworn police officers, along with support staff.

== History ==
The City of Henderson Police Department began in 1953 with just seven officers and a borrowed car from the Clark County Sheriff's Department to patrol the city.

On December 10, 2024, the Henderson Police Supervisory Association (HPSA) filed a complaint against Chief Hollie Chadwick for a series of activities deemed as "union busting" during the preceding six months. Henderson's ninth police chief during the past 25 years; Chadwick was issued an ultimatum to accept a buy-out and resign, or be fired with cause within three weeks, and placed on administrative leave. The deputy chief, Itzhak Henn, was appointed as the acting chief.

== Organization ==
The police chief is assisted by two deputy chiefs and five officers in the rank of captain. There is also a senior officer designated as corrections superintendent. One deputy chief heads the Operations Command, the other the Support Command. Each command has a number of divisions, all (except the Corrections Division) headed by a captain. Operations Command has East, West and North Patrol Divisions. Support Command has Investigative Service Division, Special Services Division, Technical Services Division and Corrections Division.

1. East Police Station
2. North Police Station
3. West Police Station

== Misconduct ==
During a traffic stop on October 29, 2010, HPD Sergeant Brett Seekatz was caught on video repeatedly kicking Adam Greene, a motorist suffering from a diabetic episode. The incident led to a $300,000 settlement and the resignation of Police Chief Jutta Chambers. Despite internal affairs findings of unnecessary force, Seekatz remained on the force and was later promoted to lieutenant.

In 2016, Sergeant Brett Seekatz, implicated in the 2010 Greene incident, was promoted to lieutenant despite his documented history of misconduct, sparking criticism from public accountability advocates.

Police Chief Patrick Moers resigned in 2017 following an external investigation that substantiated sexual harassment allegations against him. The city classified his departure as voluntary, allowing him to collect over $163,000 in unused leave, a decision criticized for concealing the nature of his exit.

Former Police Chief LaTesha Watson filed a lawsuit against the city, alleging racial discrimination and a hostile work environment during her tenure. Watson reported that HPD staff made derogatory comments about her appearance and referred to her by a racist nickname. She was eventually removed from her position under contentious circumstances.

In April 2021, an off-duty HPD officer, Katherine Cochran, was involved in a car crash suspected to be caused by intoxication. Internal investigations revealed efforts by officers Marissa Myers and John Bellow to cover up the incident by falsifying reports and muting body cameras. Despite recommendations for their dismissal, Police Chief Hollie Chadwick issued only minor disciplinary actions.

HPD faced significant staffing shortages, leading to $5 million in overtime costs for jail operations over three years. Reports also highlighted lapses in adherence to departmental policies during inmate supervision.

HPD settled a legal battle with the Las Vegas Review-Journal for $20,000 after attempting to suppress a video exposing jail staff's improper handling of detainees. The department faced criticism for undermining transparency and public accountability.

In 2018, James Herndon, a former game warden, was beaten by Henderson police officers after intervening during an armed shoplifting incident at a sporting goods store where he worked. Officers tackled Herndon alongside the fleeing suspect and used excessive force, including punches, kicks, a Taser, and striking him with the butt of an M4 rifle. Herndon sustained significant injuries, including fractured orbital bones, nerve damage, and a concussion, resulting in ongoing physical and cognitive impairments.

=== Rank structure ===
Title	Insignia
Chief of Police	
Deputy Chief	
Captain	
Lieutenant	
Sergeant	
Detective	
Police Officer	
