= Robert Frankel =

Robert Frankel may refer to:

- Robert J. Frankel (1941–2009), American thoroughbred race horse trainer
- Robert Frankel (boxer) (born 1980), American boxer
