= Rances Barthelemy =

Cuban boxer

Personal information
- Nickname: Kid Blast
- Born: 25 June 1986 (age 40) Arroyo Naranjo, Cuba
- Height: 5 ft 8 in (173 cm)
- Weight: Super featherweight; Lightweight; Light welterweight

Boxing career
- Reach: 68 in (173 cm)
- Stance: Orthodox

Boxing record
- Total fights: 36
- Wins: 30
- Win by KO: 15
- Losses: 4
- Draws: 1
- No contests: 1

Rances Barthelemy (born 25 June 1986) is a Cuban professional boxer. He is a world champion in two weight classes, having held the International Boxing Federation (IBF) junior lightweight title in 2014, and the IBF lightweight title from 2015 to 2016.

== Amateur career ==
Barthelemy was a standout amateur, competing in more than 200 fights and winning a Cuban junior national championship.

Barthelemy defected to the United States prior to the 2008 Summer Olympics. He left Cuba over frustration with how his brother Yan’s career was developing and the implications that it could have for his own future in the sport.

== Professional career ==
Barthelemy defeated Arash Usmanee on 4 January 2013 by a controversial twelve-round unanimous decision which many observers thought Usmanee had won and became the #2 contender for the IBF junior lightweight title. Barthelemy would later become the #1 contender by defeating Fahsai Sakkreerin on 21 June 2013 by second-round knockout.

Barthelemy originally defeated Argenis Mendez on 3 January 2014 to win the title, but the win was considered controversial, as Barthelemy knocked Mendez out seconds after the bell to signal the end of the second round came. Mendez and his team filled an appeal to the Minnesota Combative Sports Commission and IBF shortly after the fight, and after the appeal was successful on 30 January 2014, the result was changed to a no decision and Mendez was reinstated as the IBF junior lightweight champion. Barthelemy later defeated Mendez in a rematch on 10 July 2014 via unanimous decision to win the title. He vacated his title in February 2015 in anticipation of moving up in weight category.

In his next contest, fighting in the super lightweight division against Antonio DeMarco at the MGM Grand Garden Arena in Las Vegas, Nevada, on 21 June 2015, Barthelemy gained a convincing victory. Barthelemy showed his versatility early, coming out orthodox before switching up to southpaw midway throughout the first round. Barthelemy scored a knockdown with a huge left in the fourth round, but DeMarco survived the round. Barthelemy lost a point in the ninth round for excessive low blows, but it wasn’t enough to affect the outcome as he won 99–89 on all three cards.

On 20 May 2017, Barthelemy fought Kiryl Relikh in a WBA eliminator. Both fighters exchanged knockdowns in the fight, The judges scored the fight in favor of Barthelemy, 117-109, 116-110 and 115-111 the decision was seen as controversial. Shortly after the fight, the WBA ordered a rematch.

In the rematch, Relikh managed to get his revenge, clearly being the better man on the night, and getting the unanimous decision victory, while also winning the vacant WBA super lightweight title.

On 27 April 2019, Barthelemy fought Robert Easter Jr for the vacant WBA interim super lightweight title. In a very uneventful match, neither fighter looked like they deserve the win. The judges scored the fight as a split-draw, leaving both fighter without the secondary WBA belt.

On April 27, 2024 in Fresno, CA, Barthelemy was scheduled to face Jose Ramirez. He lost the fight by unanimous decision.

Barthelemy lost via knockout in the fourth round against Frank Martin at Frost Bank Center in San Antonio, Texas, on December 6, 2025.

== Professional boxing record ==
36 fights	30 wins	4 losses
By knockout	15	2
By decision	15	2
Draws	1	
No contests	1	

No.	Result	Record	Opponent	Type	Round, time	Date	Location	Notes
36	Loss	30–4–1 (1)	Frank Martin	KO	4 (10), 2:56	6 Dec 2025	Frost Bank Center, San Antonio, Texas, U.S.	
35	Loss	30–3–1 (1)	José Ramírez	UD	12	27 Apr 2024	Save Mart Center, Fresno, California, US	
34	Win	30–2–1 (1)	Omar Juarez	MD	10	13 May 2023	The Cosmopolitan of Las Vegas, Las Vegas, Nevada, US	
33	Loss	29–2–1 (1)	Gary Antuanne Russell	TKO	6 (10), 0:50	30 Jul 2022	Barclays Center, New York City, New York, US	
32	Win	29–1–1 (1)	Gustavo David Vittori	TKO	2 (8), 1:54	6 Nov 2021	MGM Grand Garden Arena, Las Vegas, Nevada, US	
31	Win	28–1–1 (1)	All Rivera	UD	10	30 Jan 2021	Shrine Exposition Center, Los Angeles, California, US	
30	Draw	27–1–1 (1)	Robert Easter Jr.	SD	12	27 Apr 2019	Cosmopolitan of Las Vegas, Paradise, Nevada, US	For vacant WBA (Regular) and IBO lightweight titles
29	Win	27–1 (1)	Robert Frankel	TKO	3 (10), 2:38	22 Dec 2018	Barclays Center, New York City, New York, US	
28	Loss	26–1 (1)	Kiryl Relikh	UD	12	10 Mar 2018	Freeman Coliseum, San Antonio, Texas, US	For vacant WBA super lightweight title
27	Win	26–0 (1)	Kiryl Relikh	UD	12	20 May 2017	MGM National Harbor, Oxon Hill, Maryland, US	
26	Win	25–0 (1)	Mickey Bey	SD	12	3 Jun 2016	Seminole Hard Rock Hotel and Casino, Hollywood, Florida, US	Retained IBF lightweight title
25	Win	24–0 (1)	Denis Shafikov	UD	12	18 Dec 2015	Palms Casino Resort, Paradise, Nevada, US	Won vacant IBF lightweight title
24	Win	23–0 (1)	Antonio DeMarco	UD	10	20 Jun 2015	MGM Grand Garden Arena, Paradise, Nevada, US	
23	Win	22–0 (1)	Angino Perez	TKO	2 (10), 0:15	26 Mar 2015	Park Race Track, Hialeah, Florida, US	
22	Win	21–0 (1)	David Saucedo	UD	12	4 Oct 2014	Foxwoods Resort, Ledyard, Connecticut, US	Retained IBF junior lightweight title
21	Win	20–0 (1)	Argenis Mendez	UD	12	10 Jul 2014	American Airlines Arena, Miami, Florida, US	Won IBF junior lightweight title
20	NC	19–0 (1)	Argenis Mendez	KO	2 (12), 2:59	3 Jan 2014	Target Center, Minneapolis, Minnesota, US	For IBF junior lightweight title; Originally KO win for Barthelemy, later ruled NC due to Barthelemy hitting after the bell
19	Win	19–0	Fahsai Sakkreerin	KO	2 (12), 1:26	21 Jun 2013	Convention Center, Minneapolis, Minnesota, US	
18	Win	18–0	Arash Usmanee	UD	12	4 Jan 2013	Magic City Casino, Miami, Florida, US	
17	Win	17–0	Alejandro Rodríguez	UD	8	18 Aug 2012	Doubletree Miamimart Hotel, Miami, Florida, US	
16	Win	16–0	Robert Osiobe	UD	8	11 May 2012	Texas Station Casino, North Las Vegas, Nevada, US	
15	Win	15–0	Hylon Williams, Jr.	UD	8	3 Feb 2012	Texas Station Casino, North Las Vegas, Nevada, US	Retained UBO International lightweight title
14	Win	14–0	Alejandro Barrera	KO	2 (6), 1:22	5 Nov 2011	Pepsi Coliseum, Quebec City, Quebec, Canada	
13	Win	13–0	Gerardo Robles	UD	8	29 Jul 2011	Cosmopolitan of Las Vegas, Paradise, Nevada, US	Won vacant UBO International lightweight title
12	Win	12–0	Rynell Griffin	TKO	2 (8), 2:59	29 Apr 2011	Cosmopolitan Resort, Paradise, Nevada, US	
11	Win	11–0	James Hope	TKO	4 (6), 2:04	25 Mar 2011	Cosmopolitan Resort, Paradise, Nevada, US	
10	Win	10–0	Anthony Woods	TKO	2 (6), 2:59	11 Feb 2011	Magic City Casino, Miami, Florida, US	
9	Win	9–0	Roberto Acevedo	TKO	1 (6), 2:59	19 Nov 2010	Magic City Casino, Miami, Florida, US	
8	Win	8–0	Àngel López	TKO	3 (6), 1:34	15 Sep 2010	Verizon Wireless Arena, Manchester, New Hampshire, US	
7	Win	7–0	John Temple	TKO	1 (6), 1:50	18 Aug 2010	Civic Center, Monroe, Louisiana, US	
6	Win	6–0	John Barnes	KO	1 (4), 0:44	30 Jul 2010	Buffalo Run Casino, Miami, Oklahoma, US	
5	Win	5–0	James Owens	UD	4	14 May 2010	Civic Center, Kissimmee, Florida, US	
4	Win	4–0	Robert Guillen	UD	4	12 Mar 2010	War Memorial Auditorium, Fort Lauderdale, Florida, US	
3	Win	3–0	Andrew Barnes	TKO	1 (4), 1:07	10 Oct 2009	Coliseum Complex Events Center, Greensboro, North Carolina, US	
2	Win	2–0	Vineash Rungea	KO	1 (4), 2:40	28 Aug 2009	Seminole Hard Rock Hotel and Casino, Hollywood, Florida, US	
1	Win	1–0	Jamal Clay	KO	1 (4), 0:14	8 Aug 2009	Metropolitan Convention Center, Columbia, South Carolina, US	

== Titles in boxing ==
=== Major world titles ===
- IBF junior lightweight champion (130 lbs)
- IBF lightweight champion (135 lbs)

=== Regional/International titles ===
- UBO International lightweight champion (135 lbs)

== See also ==
- List of super-featherweight boxing champions
- List of lightweight boxing champions

Sporting positions
World boxing titles
Preceded by Argenis Mendez	IBF junior lightweight champion 10 July 2014 – 10 February 2015; Vacated	Vacant Title next held by José Pedraza
Vacant Title last held by Mickey Bey	IBF lightweight champion 18 December 2015 – 6 June 2016; Vacated	Vacant Title next held by Robert Easter Jr.
