= John Molina =

John Molina may refer to:

- John John Molina, Puerto Rican boxer
- John Molina Jr., American boxer
