= José Félix Jr. =

Mexican boxer (born 1992)

Personal information
- Nickname: Josesito
- Born: José Félix Soto; May 5, 1992 (age 34) Los Mochis, Sinaloa, Mexico
- Height: 5 ft 8 in (173 cm)
- Weight: Super featherweight; Lightweight; Super lightweight; Welterweight

Boxing career
- Reach: 70 in (178 cm)
- Stance: Orthodox

Boxing record
- Total fights: 48
- Wins: 40
- Win by KO: 31
- Losses: 7
- Draws: 1

José Félix Soto (born May 5, 1992) is a Mexican professional boxer in the lightweight division.

Soto is currently serving a five-year ban set to expire in April 2029 for an anti-doping rule violation after testing positive for metandienone and stanozolol in 2024.

== Professional career ==
In November 2010, Félix beat the veteran Jesus Alberto Felix by technical knockout in the second round, the bout was held at Guaymas, Sonora, Mexico.

== Professional boxing record ==
48 fights	40 wins	7 losses
By knockout	31	3
By decision	9	4
Draws	1	

No.	Result	Record	Opponent	Type	Round, time	Date	Location	Notes
48	Loss	40–7–1	Lewis Crocker	TKO	5 (10), 1:54	27 Jan 2024	Ulster Hall, Belfast, Ireland	For Vacant WBO Inter-Continental welterweight title
47	Win	40–6–1	Gary Cully	TKO	3 (10), 2:34	20 May 2023	3Arena, Dublin, Ireland	
46	Loss	39–6–1	Sandor Martin	UD	10	1 Apr 2022	Pavelló de la Vall d'Hebron, Barcelona, Spain	
45	Loss	39–5–1	Tyrone McKenna	UD	10	6 Aug 2021	Falls Park, Belfast, Northern Ireland	For Vacant WBO Inter-Continental Super lightweight title
44	Win	39–4–1	Adalberto Borquez Covarrubias	RTD	2 (10), 3:00	14 Apr 2021	Televisora Grupo Pacifico, Culiacan, Mexico	
43	Win	38–4–1	Jesus Laguna	TKO	2 (8), 1:39	28 Nov 2020	Estacionamiento Chevrolet Zapata, Culiacan, Mexico	
42	Loss	37–4–1	Isaac Cruz	TKO	3 (8), 2:11	10 Nov 2018	Lienzo Charro Hermanos Ramírez, Corregidora, Mexico	
41	Win	37–3–1	Emmanuel Herrera	UD	8	18 Aug 2018	Centro de Usos Multiples, Los Mochis, Mexico	
40	Loss	36–3–1	Marcos Villasana	TKO	9 (12), 3:00	14 Apr 2018	Grand Oasis Arena, Cancun, Mexico	For Vacant WBC Latino lightweight title
39	Win	36–2–1	Jairo Lopez	TKO	4 (10), 1:09	16 Dec 2017	Grand Oasis Arena, Cancun, Mexico	
38	Loss	35–2–1	Jonathan Maicelo	UD	10	17 Feb 2017	Don Haskins Center, El Paso, Texas, U.S.	
37	Win	35–1–1	Jose Herrera Garcia	KO	3 (10), 1:42	14 Oct 2016	Sportsmen's Lodge, Studio City, Los Angeles, U.S.	
36	Win	34–1–1	Robert Franckel	TKO	6 (10), 2:23	27 Aug 2016	Churchill County Fairgrounds, Fallon, Nevada, U.S.	
35	Win	33–1–1	Ricky Sismundo	SD	10	30 Jan 2016	Marriott Convention Center, Burbank, California, U.S.	
34	Win	32–1–1	Marcos Leonardo Jimenez	UD	10	19 Sep 2015	Sportsmen's Lodge, Studio City, Los Angeles, U.S.	
33	Win	31–1–1	Yakubu Amidu	UD	10	13 Jun 2015	Florentine Gardens, Hollywood, California, U.S.	
32	Win	30–1–1	Raymond Sermona	KO	1 (8), 1:46	7 Mar 2015	Cotai Arena, Macao	
31	Win	29–1–1	Luis Solis	TKO	3 (8), 0:41	6 Dec 2014	Civic Auditorium, Glendale, California, U.S.	
30	Win	28–1–1	Alejandro Rodriguez	TKO	6 (8), 1:41	9 Aug 2014	Civic Auditorium, Glendale, California, U.S.	
29	Loss	27–1–1	Bryan Vázquez	UD	12	12 Apr 2014	MGM Grand Garden Arena, Las Vegas, Nevada, U.S.	For Interim WBA Super featherweight title
28	Win	27–0–1	Santos Benavides	TKO	3 (10), 1:50	16 Nov 2013	AVI Resort & Casino, Laughlin, Nevada, U.S.	
27	Win	26–0–1	Joseph Laryea	KO	1 (8), 2:37	28 Sep 2013	StubHub Center, Carson, California, U.S.	
26	Win	25–0–1	Fernando Garcia	KO	1 (10), 2:09	8 Jun 2013	Hard Rock Hotel and Casino, Las Vegas, Nevada, U.S.	
25	Win	24–0–1	Gerardo Robles	UD	10	2 Feb 2013	McAllen Convention Center, McAllen, Texas, U.S.	
24	Win	23–0–1	Meacher Major	TKO	3 (10), 2:23	15 Dec 2012	Toyota Center, Houston, Texas, U.S.	
23	Win	22–0–1	Luis Cruz	UD	10	13 Sep 2012	Hard Rock Hotel and Casino, Las Vegas, Nevada, U.S.	
22	Win	21–0–1	Alejandro Ramirez	KO	1 (4), 3:00	15 Jun 2012	La Paz, Mexico	
21	Win	20–0–1	Daniel Mendez	TKO	2 (8), 2:50	3 Mar 2012	Gimnasio German Evers, Mazatlan, Mexico	
20	Win	19–0–1	Tadeo Cerecer	UD	8	19 Nov 2011	Estadio Centenario, Los Mochis, Mexico	
19	Win	18–0–1	Arturo Gutierrez	KO	4 (10), 2:11	27 Aug 2011	Estacionamiento Sam´s, Mazatlan, Mexico	
18	Win	17–0–1	Juan Velasquez	KO	1 (8)	20 Aug 2011	La Cetto Vineyard, Valle de Guadalupe, Mexico	
17	Win	16–0–1	Maximiliano Galindo	KO	2 (8), 0:57	18 Jun 2011	Gimnasio La Bola, Guamuchil, Mexico	
16	Win	15–0–1	Alfredo Banaga Aguirre	TKO	6 (8)	16 Apr 2011	Plaza de Toros La Sanluquena, Cabo San Lucas, Mexico	
15	Win	14–0–1	Jorge Luis Alvarez Avila	UD	6	1 Apr 2011	Gimnasio German Evers, Mazatlan, Mexico	
14	Win	13–0–1	Gustavo Meza	TKO	1 (4), 2:45	12 Feb 2011	Coliseo Olimpico de la UG, Guadalajara, Mexico	
13	Win	12–0–1	Jesus Vidal	KO	1 (4)	18 Dec 2010	Estadio 20 de Noviembre, Campeche, Mexico	
12	Win	11–0–1	Jesus Alberto Felix	TKO	2 (8)	5 Nov 2010	Guaymas, Mexico	
11	Win	10–0–1	Carlos Rios	TKO	1 (6), 0:48	18 Sep 2010	Estadio Dorados, Culiacan, Mexico	
10	Win	9–0–1	Saul Hermosillo	MD	6	23 Jul 2010	Centro de Espectaculos Modelo, Ciudad Obregón, Mexico	
9	Draw	8–0–1	Maximiliano Galindo	MD	4	18 Jun 2010	Parque Revolucion, Culiacán, Mexico	
8	Win	8–0	Rafael Garcia	TKO	3 (6), 0:25	21 May 2010	Estadio de Beisbol Arturo C. Nahl, La Paz, Mexico	
7	Win	7–0	Norberto Gamez	KO	1 (6), 2:32	24 Apr 2010	Gimnasio La Bola, Guamúchil, Mexico	
6	Win	6–0	Hector Abundis	KO	2 (4)	13 Mar 2010	Modelo Center, La Paz, Mexico	
5	Win	5–0	Francisco Rodriguez	KO	2 (4), 1:27	5 Mar 2010	Centro de Usos Múltiples, San Carlos Nuevo Guaymas, Mexico	
4	Win	4–0	Abraham Verdugo	KO	1 (4)	3 Oct 2009	Auditorio Medardo Meza, Loreto, Mexico	
3	Win	3–0	Patricio Lugo	KO	2 (4), 2:05	25 Sep 2009	Polideportivo Centenario, Los Mochis, Mexico	
2	Win	2–0	Adan Garcia	TKO	5 (6), 1:30	4 Sep 2009	Polideportivo Centenario, Los Mochis, Mexico	
1	Win	1–0	Ruben Longoria	KO	1 (4), 1:14	31 Jul 2009	Malecon Turistico, Guaymas, Mexico	
