= Robert Easter Jr. =

American boxer (born 1991)

Personal information
- Nickname: E-Bunny
- Nationality: American
- Born: January 26, 1991 (age 35) Toledo, Ohio, U.S.
- Height: 5 ft 11 in (180 cm)
- Weight: Lightweight

Boxing career
- Reach: 76 in (193 cm)
- Stance: Orthodox

Boxing record
- Total fights: 25
- Wins: 23
- Win by KO: 14
- Losses: 1
- Draws: 1

Robert Easter Jr. (born January 26, 1991) is an American professional boxer who held the IBF lightweight title from 2016 to 2018. As of November 2020, he is ranked as the world's eighth best active light welterweight by BoxRec.

== Amateur career ==
As an amateur, Easter Jr. compiled a record of 213 wins and 17 losses, and was an alternate on the United States boxing team for the 2012 Olympics. Having not won any national amateur titles, his decision to turn professional later that year came at the recommendation of fellow Ohio native and former world champion Adrien Broner, with whom he currently shares a trainer in Mike Stafford.

== Professional career ==
=== Early years ===
Easter made his professional debut on November 10, 2012, stopping Eddie Corona in two rounds. A further seven consecutive fights were won by stoppage, until an eight-round unanimous decision (UD) against Daniel Attah on January 25, 2014. Easter scored his first notable win on April 1, 2016, stopping former world champion Argenis Mendez in five rounds.

=== IBF lightweight champion ===
==== Easter Jr. vs Commey ====
In his next fight, on September 9, 2016, Easter faced undefeated top contender Richard Commey of Ghana for the IBF lightweight title. The fight was a scintillating one and an extremely competitive bout. Commey was able to knock Easter down with a counter right hand in the eight round, albeit it was a controversial knockdown as Easter's glove barely grazed the canvas. Easter was then able to subsequently stagger Commey in the ninth as he was hit with a massive shot by Easter when he was against the ropes. Easter then hurt Commey again severely in the twelfth and final round with a right hand, nearly knocking him down as Commey's knees buckled and he had to hold on to survive. Easter was able to win a split decision (115–112, 114–113, and 113–114) on the judge's scorecards.

==== Title defenses ====
His first defense, on February 10, 2017, was rousingly successful, as he scored three knockdowns against Luis Cruz en route to a UD. On June 30, Easter had a much tougher outing against mandatory challenger Denis Shafikov, whom he defeated via unanimous decision after a competitive and hard-hitting slugfest.

Easter was scheduled to make his third defense of his IBF lightweight title against contender Javier Fortuna on January 20, 2018, in the Barclays Center on the undercard of the Errol Spence Jr. and Lamont Peterson fight. Fortuna came in overweight so it was no longer a defense for Easter Jr. as he would've retained his belt even if Fortuna won the fight. Nonetheless, Easter gave a shaky performance as the shorter southpaw Fortuna was able to trouble Easter with his hand-speed and movement, he was even able to rattle Easter multiple times throughout the fight. However Fortuna had a point deducted in the second round due to tactical misconduct. Even though Easter's performance was underwhelming he was able to earn a very controversial split decision from the judges (114–113, 115–112, and 113–114) which resulted in an on pour of boos from the crowd.

==== Easter Jr. vs. Garcia ====
On April 17, 2018, Mikey Garcia vacated the IBF light welterweight title, confirming he would drop back to lightweight to defend his WBC title. On April 24, WBC president Sulaiman stated Garcia would participate in a lightweight unification with Easter Jr in the summer. On May 1, it was reported that the fight would likely take place in July or August at the Staples Center in Los Angeles. July 28 was later confirmed as the fight date.

Before a crowd of 12,560, Garcia dropped Easter in round 3 on his way to a unanimous decision win with scores of 116–111, 117-110 and 118–109, to become the unified WBC and IBF lightweight champion. The fight started with Easter using his distance well to keep Garcia at arms reach. In round 3, Garcia knocked Easter down with a left hook to the head. Garcia did not seem to struggle to get close as Easter, who was using his long jab effectively as Garcia himself was also managing to land his jab, despite the reach disadvantage. From round 6, Garcia controlled the fight. It appeared that Easter became wary of Garcia's power and began to fight more cautiously. Both fighters traded in round 9 with Garcia landing hard shots to the body and Easter landing with his left hand. In rounds 10 and 11, Easter took punishment against the ropes. Garcia then finished strong in the final round. Easter was humble in defeat and gave full credit to Garcia, "He was just a better man tonight. I take my hat off to Mikey. He's a true warrior. Whenever we step in the ring, we are both putting our lives on the line, and tonight Mikey was victorious. I just couldn't find the timing and I just couldn't let my right hand go." CompuBox showed that Garcia outlanded him 95–34 in total punches over the final four rounds. Overall, Garcia landed 176 punches of 555 thrown (32%) and Easter landed 129 of his 507 (25%). Easter landed 89 of 343 jabs, however he had more success in the first half of the fight. The fight averaged 680,000 viewers and peaked at 725,000 viewers.

==== Easter Jr. vs. Barthelemy ====
On April 27, 2019, Easter Jr fought Rances Barthelemy for the vacant WBA regular lightweight title. Both fighters were reluctant to engage throughout the fight, with both only occasionally letting their hands go. According to ShoStats, Easter Jr landed 54 punches, while Barthelemy landed 52 punches altogether. Each fighter won on one judges' scorecard 115–113, while the third judge scored the fight as a draw 114-114, concluding the result to a split-decision draw.

==== Easter Jr. vs Granados ====
For his next fight, Easter Jr. moved up to 140 lbs and faced Adrián Granados. Unlike in his previous bout against Barthelemy, Easter Jr. came out firing from the first bell, and successfully landing on Granados. Granados did well in the closing rounds, throwing and landing more punches than Easter Jr., but it was not enough to overcome an early deficit. The judges scored the fight 100–90, 98-92 and 97–93, all in favor of Easter Jr.

Easter was shot in a robbery leaving a casino in Cincinnati, Ohio. The shooting occurred in the early morning hours February 7, 2022. Easter has not fought since.

== Professional boxing record ==
| 25 fights | 23 wins | 1 loss |
|---|---|---|
| By knockout | 14 | 0 |
| By decision | 9 | 1 |
| Draws | 1 | |

| No. | Result | Record | Opponent | Type | Round, time | Date | Location | Notes |
|---|---|---|---|---|---|---|---|---|
| 25 | Win | 23–1–1 | Ryan Martin | UD | 12 | Feb 20, 2021 | Mohegan Sun Arena, Montville, Connecticut, U.S. | |
| 24 | Win | 22–1–1 | Adrián Granados | UD | 10 | Oct 26, 2019 | Santander Arena, Reading, Pennsylvania, U.S. | |
| 23 | Draw | 21–1–1 | Rances Barthelemy | SD | 12 | Apr 27, 2019 | Cosmopolitan of Las Vegas, Paradise, Nevada, U.S. | For vacant WBA (Regular) and IBO lightweight titles |
| 22 | Loss | 21–1 | Mikey Garcia | UD | 12 | Jul 28, 2018 | Staples Center, Los Angeles, California, U.S. | Lost IBF lightweight title; For WBC lightweight title |
| 21 | Win | 21–0 | Javier Fortuna | SD | 12 | Jan 20, 2018 | Barclays Center, New York City, New York, U.S. | Retained IBF lightweight title |
| 20 | Win | 20–0 | Denis Shafikov | UD | 12 | Jun 30, 2017 | Huntington Center, Toledo, Ohio, U.S. | Retained IBF lightweight title |
| 19 | Win | 19–0 | Luis Cruz | UD | 12 | Feb 10, 2017 | Huntington Center, Toledo, Ohio, U.S. | Retained IBF lightweight title |
| 18 | Win | 18–0 | Richard Commey | SD | 12 | Sep 9, 2016 | Santander Arena, Reading, Pennsylvania, U.S. | Won vacant IBF lightweight title |
| 17 | Win | 17–0 | Argenis Mendez | TKO | 5 (10), 2:43 | Apr 1, 2016 | D.C. Armory, Washington, D.C., U.S. | |
| 16 | Win | 16–0 | Juan Ramon Solis | TKO | 3 (10), 0:45 | Oct 3, 2015 | U.S. Bank Arena, Cincinnati, Ohio, U.S. | |
| 15 | Win | 15–0 | Osumanu Akaba | TKO | 6 (10), 2:36 | Aug 28, 2015 | Convention Center, Washington, D.C., U.S. | |
| 14 | Win | 14–0 | Miguel Angel Mendoza | KO | 2 (10), 2:13 | Jun 20, 2015 | MGM Grand Garden Arena, Paradise, Nevada, U.S. | |
| 13 | Win | 13–0 | José Alejandro Rodríguez | TKO | 2 (8), 1:15 | Mar 7, 2015 | MGM Grand Garden Arena, Paradise, Nevada, U.S. | |
| 12 | Win | 12–0 | Angel Hernandez | UD | 10 | Dec 12, 2014 | UIC Pavilion, Chicago, Illinois, U.S. | |
| 11 | Win | 11–0 | Roberto Acevedo | KO | 1 (6), 1:22 | Sep 6, 2014 | U.S. Bank Arena, Cincinnati, Ohio, U.S. | |
| 10 | Win | 10–0 | Carlos Cardenas | UD | 8 | May 2, 2014 | The Joint, Paradise, Nevada, U.S. | |
| 9 | Win | 9–0 | Daniel Attah | UD | 8 | Jan 25, 2014 | D.C. Armory, Washington, D.C., U.S. | |
| 8 | Win | 8–0 | Hardy Paredes | KO | 1 (8), 2:30 | Dec 14, 2013 | Alamodome, San Antonio, Texas, U.S. | |
| 7 | Win | 7–0 | Lance Williams | TKO | 1 (8), 2:43 | Sep 12, 2013 | MGM Grand Premier Ballroom, Paradise, Nevada, U.S. | |
| 6 | Win | 6–0 | Lowell Brownfield | KO | 2 (6), 0:38 | Aug 9, 2013 | Fantasy Springs Resort Casino, Indio, California, U.S. | |
| 5 | Win | 5–0 | Antoine Knight | TKO | 3 (6), 1:46 | Jun 22, 2013 | Barclays Center, New York City, New York, U.S. | |
| 4 | Win | 4–0 | Eduardo Guillen | TKO | 2 (4), 1:30 | May 18, 2013 | Boardwalk Hall, Atlantic City, New Jersey, U.S. | |
| 3 | Win | 3–0 | Jose Valderrama | RTD | 1 (4), 3:00 | Feb 16, 2013 | Boardwalk Hall, Atlantic City, New Jersey, U.S. | |
| 2 | Win | 2–0 | David Castillo | KO | 1 (4), 1:43 | Dec 8, 2012 | Business Expo Center, Anaheim, California, U.S. | |
| 1 | Win | 1–0 | Eddie Corona | TKO | 2 (4), 2:39 | Nov 10, 2012 | Staples Center, Los Angeles, California, U.S. | |

Sporting positions
World boxing titles
| Vacant Title last held by Rances Barthelemy | IBF lightweight champion September 9, 2016 – July 28, 2018 | Succeeded by Mikey Garcia |
Awards
| Previous: Daniel Jacobs vs. Sergio Mora; Round 1 | PBC Round of the Year vs. Richard Commey; Round 9; 2016 | Next: John Molina Jr. vs. Ivan Redkach; Round 3 |
