= Jackson Mariñez =

Dominican boxer

Jackson Maríñez
Personal information
- Nickname: El Fénix
- Nationality: Dominican
- Born: December 21, 1990 (age 35) Santo Domingo, Dominican Republic
- Height: 5 ft 10 in (178 cm)
- Weight: Lightweight; Light welterweight

Boxing career
- Reach: 69 1/2 in (177 cm)
- Stance: Orthodox

Boxing record
- Total fights: 28
- Wins: 23
- Win by KO: 11
- Losses: 5
- Draws: 0
- No contests: 0

Jackson Maríñez (born December 21, 1990) is a Dominican professional boxer who challenged for the WBA interim lightweight title in 2020.

== Professional career ==
=== Maríñez vs. Romero ===
Maríñez faced undefeated Rolando Romero for the vacant WBA interim lightweight title on August 15, 2020, at the Mohegan Sun Arena in Uncasville, Connecticut. Romero captured the vacant WBA interim title via twelve-round unanimous decision with the judges' scorecards reading 118–110, 116–112, 115–113 in his favor. This decision was considered very controversial, with many feeling Marinez deserved the win.

=== Maríñez vs. Commey ===
In his next fight, he took on former IBF lightweight champion Richard Commey on February 13, 2021, in Paradise, Nevada. Maríñez suffered his second consecutive professional defeat, losing via sixth-round knockout.

== Professional boxing record ==
28 fights	23 wins	5 losses
By knockout	11	4
By decision	12	1

No.	Result	Record	Opponent	Type	Round, time	Date	Location	Notes
28	Loss	23–5	(United States) Avious Griffin	RTD	5 (10), 3:00	Aug 21, 2026	(United States) Pechanga Resort Casino, Temecula, California, U.S.	
27	Win	23–4	(Dominican Republic) Angel Apolinar Elena Perez	TKO	1 (8), 1:36	Nov 22, 2025	Coliseo Carlos 'Teo' Cruz, Santo Domingo, Dominican Republic	
26	Loss	22–4	(Mexico) Lindolfo Delgado	TKO	5 (10), 2:14	Dec 7, 2024	(United States) Footprint Center, Phoenix, Arizona, U.S.	For WBO Latino Super-lightweight Title
25	Win	22–3	(Dominican Republic) Franyel Perez Vasquez	KO	1 (8), 0:37	Jun 28, 2024	Pabellon De Esgrima, Centro Olimpico, Santo Domingo, Dominican Republic	
24	Win	21–3	(Dominican Republic) Osvaldo Cabrera Santana	KO	2 (8), 1:20	Mar 24, 2023	Dominican Republic	
23	Win	20–3	(Dominican Republic) Israel Valerio Nina	KO	1 (8), 2:17	Sep 25, 2022	Santo Domingo, Dominican Republic	
22	Loss	19–3	(United States) Frank Martin	TKO	10 (10), 2:30	Jul 9, 2022	(United States) Alamodome, San Antonio, Texas, U.S.	
21	Loss	19–2	(Ghana) Richard Commey	KO	6 (10), 2:35	Feb 13, 2021	(United States) MGM Grand Conference Center, Paradise, Nevada, U.S.	
20	Loss	19–1	(United States) Rolando Romero	UD	12	Aug 15, 2020	(United States) Mohegan Sun Arena, Montville, Connecticut, U.S.	For vacant WBA interim lightweight title
19	Win	19–0	(Mexico) Yardley Armenta Cruz	TKO	2 (8), 0:35	Dec 28, 2019	(United States) State Farm Arena, Atlanta, Georgia, U.S.	
18	Win	18–0	(Venezuela) Kenin Betancourt	RTD	1 (11), 3:00	Jul 27, 2019	Coliseo Carlos 'Teo' Cruz, Santo Domingo, Dominican Republic	Retained WBA Fedelatin lightweight title
17	Win	17–0	(Venezuela) Luis Enrique Romero	UD	8	Apr 27, 2019	Club el Millon, Santo Domingo, Dominican Republic	
16	Win	16–0	(Venezuela) Adrian Jose Perez Aparicio	UD	6	Mar 16, 2019	Coliseo Carlos 'Teo' Cruz, Santo Domingo, Dominican Republic	
15	Win	15–0	(Mexico) Jesus Arevalo	TKO	10 (11)	Nov 10, 2018	Hotel Jaragua, Santo Domingo, Dominican Republic	Retained WBA Fedelatin lightweight title
14	Win	14–0	(Venezuela) Esneiker Correa	UD	8	Aug 25, 2018	Polideportivo Maria Auxiliadora, Santo Domingo, Dominican Republic	
13	Win	13–0	(Panama) Rolando Giono	UD	11	May 24, 2018	Karibe Convention Center, Pétion-Ville, Haiti	Won vacant WBA Fedelatin lightweight title
12	Win	12–0	(Dominican Republic) Andres Zapata	TKO	7 (8), 2:31	Mar 17, 2018	Hotel Jaragua, Santo Domingo, Dominican Republic	
11	Win	11–0	(Venezuela) Alfonso Jesus Perez Mora	PTS	8	Nov 18, 2017	Hotel Jaragua, Santo Domingo, Dominican Republic	
10	Win	10–0	(Dominican Republic) Francisco Contreras Lopez	UD	8	Jul 26, 2017	Hotel Jaragua, Santo Domingo, Dominican Republic	
9	Win	9–0	(Venezuela) Pedro Verdu	UD	8	Feb 24, 2017	Maunoloa Night Club y Casino, Santo Domingo, Dominican Republic	
8	Win	8–0	(Venezuela) Jherson Pérez	TKO	4 (7), 2:44	Dec 16, 2016	Maunoloa Night Club y Casino, Santo Domingo, Dominican Republic	
7	Win	7–0	(Dominican Republic) Jesus Miguel Torres Perez	UD	6	Dec 3, 2016	Club Billy Thompson, Santo Domingo, Dominican Republic	
6	Win	6–0	(Venezuela) Jesus Cuadro	UD	9	Sep 16, 2016	Hotel Jaragua, Santo Domingo, Dominican Republic	Won vacant WBA Fedecaribe lightweight title
5	Win	5–0	(Dominican Republic) Franklin Fortuna	TKO	4 (6), 2:03	Aug 27, 2016	Club Rubén Espino, Santiago de los Caballeros, Dominican Republic	
4	Win	4–0	(Dominican Republic) Luis Ernesto José	UD	6	Jun 25, 2016	Gimnasio Billy Thompson, Santo Domingo, Dominican Republic	
3	Win	3–0	(Dominican Republic) Brayner Vazquez	SD	4	Apr 15, 2016	Hotel Jaragua, Santo Domingo, Dominican Republic	
2	Win	2–0	(Dominican Republic) Alberto Valenzuela	TKO	1 (4), 2:03	Mar 5, 2016	Club Rubèn Espino, Santiago de los Caballeros, Dominican Republic	
1	Win	1–0	(Dominican Republic) Juan Rafael Polanco	UD	4	Feb 6, 2016	Hotel Jaragua, Santo Domingo, Dominican Republic	
