= Rolando Giono =

Panamanian professional boxer (born 1987)

Rolando Giono (born March 8, 1987) is a Panamanian professional boxer.

Giono lost to Emanuel Lopez for the WBA interim lightweight title.

He also lost to Jackson Marinez for the WBA Fedelatin lightweight.

== Professional boxing record ==
35 fights	22 wins	12 losses
By knockout	16	3
By decision	6	8
By disqualification	0	1
No contests	1	

No.	Result	Record	Opponent	Type	Round, time	Date	Location	Notes
35	Loss	22–12 (1)	Oliver Flores	TKO	2 (8), 2:20	11 Sep 2019	Centro de Convenciones Vasco Núñez de Balboa, Panama City, Panama	
34	Loss	22–11 (1)	Barnie Argüelles	DQ	6 (8), 2:41	21 Aug 2019	Bohios Alegres, Panama City, Panama	
33	Loss	22–10 (1)	Jackson Mariñez	UD	11	24 May 2018	Karibe Convention Center, Pétion-Ville, Haiti	For vacant WBA Fedelatin lightweight title
32	Win	22–9 (1)	Edgar Guilén	TKO	2 (8), 2:09	22 Dec 2017	Sociedad Española, Panama City, Panama	
31	Loss	21–9 (1)	Frank Urquiaga	PTS	8	11 Nov 2017	Bilbao Arena, Bilbao, Spain	
30	Loss	21–8 (1)	Cristian Baéz	UD	10	20 May 2017	Hotel Veneto, Panama City, Panama	
29	Win	21–7 (1)	Addir Sánchez	RTD	3 (8)	1 Apr 2017	Hotel Veneto, Panama City, Panama	
28	Win	20–7 (1)	Kendry Galbán	TKO	1 (8), 2:53	11 Mar 2017	Centro Recreacional Yesterday, Turmero, Venezuela	
27	Win	19–7 (1)	Alfredo Mirabal	RTD	4 (8), 3:00	11 Feb 2017	Centro Recreacional Yesterday, Turmero, Venezuela	
26	Win	18–7 (1)	Denilson Herrera	TKO	4 (8), 1:26	9 Aug 2016	Fantastic Casino de Albrook Mall, Panama City, Panama	
25	Loss	17–7 (1)	Miguel Berchelt	TKO	3 (10), 1:50	19 Dec 2015	Coliseo Yucatán, Mérida, Mexico	
24	Loss	17–6 (1)	Emanuel López	TKO	10 (12), 1:34	20 Jun 2015	Palenque de Gallos, Comitán, Mexico	For WBA interim super featherweight title
23	Win	17–5 (1)	Tony Goméz	MD	9	27 Mar 2015	Hotel Sortis, Panama City, Panama	Won vacant WBA Fedecaribe super featherweight title
22	Win	16–5 (1)	Nelson Guillén	TKO	2 (8), 2:41	4 Oct 2014	Gimnasio Municipal, 24 de Diciembre, Panama	
21	Win	15–5 (1)	Julio Camano	TKO	4 (8), 0:37	25 Apr 2014	Hotel El Panama, Panama City, Panama	
20	NC	14–5 (1)	Nelson Guillén	NC	2 (8), 1:20	8 Feb 2014	Cancha de Canto del Llano, Santiago de Veraguas, Panama	
19	Win	14–5	José Fonseca	UD	6	2 Nov 2013	Turiscentro Panamá, Paso Canoas, Panama	
18	Win	13–5	Stanley Mendez	KO	3 (8), 1:48	22 May 2013	Hotel RIU, Panama City, Panama	
17	Win	12–5	Fabian Marimon	KO	1 (8), 2:10	17 Nov 2012	Fantastic Casino de Albrook Mall, Panama City, Panama	
16	Loss	11–5	Jezreel Corrales	SD	8	11 Apr 2012	Hotel Veneto, Panama City, Panama	For vacant Panamanian featherweight title
15	Loss	11–4	Jezreel Corrales	SD	8	23 Nov 2011	Roberto Durán Arena, Panama City, Panama	
14	Win	11–3	Javier Coronado	SD	8	8 Sep 2011	Roberto Durán Arena, Panama City, Panama	
13	Win	10–3	José Aguirre	TKO	4 (6), 1:25	28 Oct 2010	Hotel Veneto, Panama City, Panama	
12	Win	9–3	Saimon Siris	UD	6	5 Aug 2010	Hotel Veneto, Panama City, Panama	
11	Win	8–3	Elvis Aguirre	TKO	4 (8)	2 Jul 2010	Centro de Convenciones COOPEVE, Santiago de Veraguas, Panama	
10	Win	7–3	Aristides Quintero	TKO	3 (8), 1:11	21 Jan 2010	Centro de Convenciones Atlapa, Panama City, Panama	
9	Loss	6–3	Julio Camano	UD	6	9 Oct 2009	Roberto Durán Arena, Panama City, Panama	
8	Win	6–2	Daniel Deago	KO	1 (6), 2:37	8 Aug 2009	Gimnasio Yuyin Luzcando, Betania, Panama	
7	Win	5–2	Marcos Sune	SD	6	19 Feb 2009	Centro de Convenciones Atlapa, Panama City, Panama	
6	Loss	4–2	Antonio Fernández	MD	6	30 Oct 2008	Centro de Convenciones Figali, Panama City, Panama	
5	Win	4–1	Dennis Avilés	KO	1 (4), 1:30	18 Oct 2008	Gimnasio N° 1 de La Sabana, San José, Costa Rica	
4	Loss	3–1	Julio Camaño	UD	4	2 Aug 2008	Gimnasio Yuyin Luzcando, Betania, Panama	
3	Win	3–0	Javier Jiménez	TKO	2 (4), 2:06	25 Apr 2008	Gimnasio Yuyin Luzcando, Betania, Panama	
2	Win	2–0	Armando Carpintero	MD	4	17 Nov 2007	Gimnasio Escolar, David, Panama	
1	Win	1–0	Josue Arauz	KO	2 (4), 1:02	29 Sep 2007	Jardín Les Mellos, Alanje, Panama	
