= Jonathan Maicelo =

Peruvian boxer

Personal information
- Nicknames: El Depredador, La Cobra
- Born: Jonathan Maicelo Román; August 10, 1983 (age 42) Callao, Peru
- Height: 5 ft 7 in (1.70 m)
- Weight: Lightweight

Boxing career
- Stance: Orthodox

Boxing record
- Total fights: 30
- Wins: 26
- Win by KO: 13
- Losses: 3
- Draws: 0
- No contests: 1
Medal record
Men's amateur boxing
Representing Peru
Bolivarian Games
Silver medal – second place	2001 Ambato	Lightweight
Pre-Pan American Tournament
Silver medal – second place	2003 Tijuana	Lightweight

Jonathan Maicelo Román (born August 10, 1983) is a Peruvian professional boxer. He has a record of 20 wins (12 KO) and 2 losses (1 KO).

He was a silver medalist at the 2001 Bolivarian Games (Ambato) and at the 2003 Pre-Panamerican Tournament (Tijuana, Mexico), a quarterfinalist at the 2003 Pan American Games (Santo Domingo, Dominican Republic), and a semifinalist at the 2004 Pre-Olympic Tournament (Rio de Janeiro, Brazil).

== Professional record ==
29 fights	26 wins	3 losses
By knockout	13	2
By decision	13	1

Result	Record	Opponent	Type	Round, time	Date	Location	Notes
Win	26-3	(Venezuela) Angel Granados	December 16, 2017	RTD 6	3:00	Estadio Municipal de Surquillo, Lima, Peru	
Loss	25-3	(Mexico) Raymundo Beltran	May 20, 2017	KO 2	1:25	(United States) Madison Square Garden, New York City, New York, U.S.	For NABF, vacant WBA International and WBO NABO lightweight titles
Win	25-2	(Mexico) José Félix Jr.	February 17, 2017	UD 10		(United States) Don Haskins Convention Center, El Paso, Texas, U.S.	
Win	24-2	(Dominican Republic) Ramesis Gil	May 14, 2016	UD 8		(United States) PA Sheet Metal Workers Hall, Philadelphia, Pennsylvania, U.S.	
Win	23-2	(Ghana) Samuel Amoako	January 22, 2016	UD 6		(United States) PA Sheet Metal Workers Hall, Philadelphia, Pennsylvania, U.S.	
Win	22-2	(United States) Brandon Bennett	August 28, 2015	UD 10		(United States) Walter E. Washington Convention Center, Washington, D.C., U.S.	
Loss	21-2	(Colombia) Darleys Perez	January 9, 2015	UD 12		(United States) Chumash Casino, Santa Ynez, California, US	For interim WBA lightweight title
Win	21-1	(Armenia) Art Hovhannisyan	July 11, 2014	SD 10		(United States) Little Creek Casino Resort, Shelton, Washington, US	Won WBC International Silver lightweight title
NC	20-1	(Argentina) Jorge Luis Rodriguez	October 19, 2013	N 3	2:40	Coliseo Miguel Grau, Callao, Peru	
Win	20-1	(Mexico) Jose Alejandro Rodriguez	August 17, 2013	KO 10	0:22	(United States) Revel Resort, Atlantic City, New Jersey, U.S.	
Loss	19-1	(Russia) Rustam Nugaev	April 5, 2013	KO 8	2:03	(United States) Chumash Casino, Santa Ynez, California, U.S.	For USBA lightweight title
Win	19-0	(United States) Tyler Ziolkowski	January 26, 2013	TKO 2	1:51	(United States) Fitzgerald's Casino & Hotel, Tunica, Mississippi, U.S.	
Win	18-0	(Nicaragua) Wilfredo Acuna	August 10, 2012	UD 6	3:00	(United States) Morongo Casino Resort & Spa, Cabazon, California, U.S.	
Win	17-0	(Nigeria) Daniel Attah	July 20, 2012	TKO 3	1:47	(United States) Chumash Casino, Santa Ynez, California, U.S.	
Win	16-0	(Ecuador) Fernando Angulo	May 19, 2012	UD 9	3:00	Coliseo Miguel Grau, Callao, Peru	Won vacant WBA Fedecentro lightweight title
Win	15-0	(Argentina) Leonardo Esteban Gonzalez	April 16, 2011	TKO 9	1:29	(Peru) Estadio Monumental, Lima, Perú	
Win	14-0	(Colombia) Oscar Cuero	October 16, 2010	UD 10	3:00	(United States) Washington School, Union City, New Jersey, U.S.	
Win	13-0	(Argentina) Alberto Leopoldo Santillan	June 26, 2010	UD 10	3:00	(Peru) Lima, Perú	
Win	12-0	(Colombia) Victor Julio Salgado	February 27, 2010	KO 1	1:41	(Peru) Lima, Perú	Retained WBC Latino lightweight title
Win	11-0	(Argentina) Miguel Leonardo Caceres	September 5, 2009	UD 10	3:00	(Peru) Lima, Perú	Won vacant WBC Latino lightweight title
Win	10-0	(Mexico) Javier Gallegos	June 20, 2009	UD 10	3:00	(Peru) Lima, Perú	
Win	9-0	(Mexico) Daniel Montoya	May 28, 2009	TKO 8	2:00	(Peru) Lima, Perú	
Win	8-0	(Mexico) Jesus Camacho	March 20, 2009	KO 2	0:50	(Peru) Lima, Perú	
Win	7-0	(Mexico) Antonio Sanchez	November 15, 2008	KO 1	0:35	(Peru) Huancayo, Perú	
Win	6-0	(Ecuador) Gerardo Bermeo	June 21, 2007	TKO 4	1:31	(Peru) Lima, Perú	
Win	5-0	(Peru) Jesus Robladillo	July 25, 2006	TKO 2	1:25	(Peru) Lima, Perú	
Win	4-0	(Peru) Luis Paredes	May 18, 2006	UD 6	3:00	(Peru) Lima, Perú	
Win	3-0	(Peru) Richard Nunez	March 2, 2006	KO 1	2:15	(Peru) Lima, Perú	
Win	2-0	(Peru) Luis A. Gutierrez	December 17, 2005	TKO 4	1:30	(Peru) Lima, Perú	
Win	1-0	(Peru) Luis Noe	April 1, 2005	UD 4	3:00	(Peru) Lima, Perú	
