= Takashi Uchiyama =

Japanese boxer

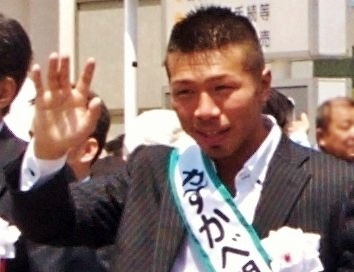
- Uchiyama during his 2012 triumphal parade in Kasukabe, Saitama, Japan

Personal information
- Nicknames: KO Dynamite; Knockout Dynamite
- Born: Takashi Uchiyama; 10 November 1979 (age 46) Nagasaki Prefecture, Japan
- Height: 5 ft 7.5 in (171 cm)
- Weight: Super-featherweight

Boxing career
- Reach: 71.5 in (182 cm)
- Stance: Orthodox

Boxing record
- Total fights: 27
- Wins: 24
- Win by KO: 20
- Losses: 2
- Draws: 1

Takashi Uchiyama (内山 高志, Uchiyama Takashi; born November 10, 1979) is a Japanese former professional boxer who competed from 2005 to 2016, having held the WBA (Super) super-featherweight title from 2010 to 2016.

== Early life ==
He was born in Nagasaki Prefecture, grew up in Kasukabe, Saitama, and lives in Tokyo.

== Boxing career ==
Uchiyama compiled an amateur record of 91–22 (59 KOs), including his accomplishments of winning four lightweight titles. He turned professional in 2005, and won his debut via the first round knockout on 16 July. On September 8, 2007, Uchiyama captured the OPBF super featherweight title, then defended it five times. He has been called by a nickname KO Dynamite (Knockout Dynamite) in Japan.

=== WBA super featherweight champion ===
Uchiyama won the WBA super featherweight title from Mexican Juan Carlos Salgado via a twelfth round TKO in the latter's first title defence in Tokyo at the Tokyo Big Sight on January 11, 2010.

On May 17, 2010, he defeated Venezuelan Angel Granados via a sixth round TKO for his first defence at the Saitama Super Arena.

On 31 December 2015, Uchiyama was slated to fight his eleventh title defense in a row. Uchiyama fought methodically in the opening rounds, and managed to land some big shots on his opponent. He finished it in the third round of the contest with a vicious body shot, to retain his WBA super featherweight belt for the eleventh time.

On April 27, 2016, Uchiyama fought 24-year old Jezreel Corrales. Corrales was aggressive from the opening bell, and shocked Uchiyama by dropping him three times in just two rounds. During the last knockdown, the referee decided he had seen enough and stopped the fight immediately.

On October 3, 2016, it was announced that a contract has been signed for a rematch against Corrales.

The rematch was a very different fight compared to their first matchup. It was more of a tactical battle, in which Uchiyama even managed to drop Corrales in the fifth round. However, Corrales ended up victorious again, with two of the judges awarding him with the win, scoring the fight 117–110 and 115–112 in his favor, while the third judge saw Uchiyama as the winner, scoring the fight 114–113 in his favor.

== Professional boxing record ==
27 fights	24 wins	2 losses
By knockout	20	1
By decision	4	1
Draws	1	

No.	Result	Record	Opponent	Type	Round, time	Date	Location	Notes
27	Loss	24–2–1	Jezreel Corrales	SD	12	Dec 31, 2016	Ota City General Gymnasium, Tokyo, Japan	For WBA (Super) super-featherweight title
26	Loss	24–1–1	Jezreel Corrales	KO	2 (12), 2:59	Apr 27, 2016	Ota City General Gymnasium, Tokyo, Japan	Lost WBA (Super) super-featherweight title
25	Win	24–0–1	Oliver Flores	TKO	3 (12), 1:47	Dec 31, 2015	Ota City General Gymnasium, Tokyo, Japan	Retained WBA (Super) super-featherweight title
24	Win	23–0–1	Jomthong Chuwattana	TKO	2 (12), 1:15	May 6, 2015	Ota City General Gymnasium, Tokyo, Japan	Retained WBA (Super) super-featherweight title
23	Win	22–0–1	Israel Héctor Perez	RTD	9 (12), 3:00	Dec 31, 2014	Ota City General Gymnasium, Tokyo, Japan	Retained WBA super-featherweight title
22	Win	21–0–1	Daiki Kaneko	UD	12	Dec 31, 2013	Ota City General Gymnasium, Tokyo, Japan	Retained WBA super-featherweight title
21	Win	20–0–1	Jaider Parra	KO	5 (12), 2:15	May 6, 2013	Ota City General Gymnasium, Tokyo, Japan	Retained WBA super-featherweight title
20	Win	19–0–1	Bryan Vázquez	TKO	8 (12), 2:59	Dec 31, 2012	Ota City General Gymnasium, Tokyo, Japan	Retained WBA super-featherweight title
19	Draw	18–0–1	Michael Farenas	TD	3 (12), 1:15	Jul 16, 2012	Comprehensive Gymnasium, Kasukabe, Japan	Retained WBA super-featherweight title; TD after Uchiyama cut from accidental head clash
18	Win	18–0	Jorge Solís	TKO	11 (12), 0:19	Dec 31, 2011	Cultural Gymnasium, Yokohama, Japan	Retained WBA super-featherweight title
17	Win	17–0	Takashi Miura	RTD	8 (12), 3:00	Jan 31, 2011	Ariake Colosseum, Tokyo, Japan	Retained WBA super-featherweight title
16	Win	16–0	Roy Mukhlis	TKO	5 (12), 2:27	Sep 20, 2010	Super Arena, Saitama, Japan	Retained WBA super-featherweight title
15	Win	15–0	Angel Granados	TKO	6 (12), 1:42	May 17, 2010	Super Arena, Saitama, Japan	Retained WBA super-featherweight title
14	Win	14–0	Juan Carlos Salgado	TKO	12 (12), 2:48	Jan 11, 2010	Big Sight, Tokyo, Japan	Won WBA super-featherweight title
13	Win	13–0	Aaron Melgarejo	TKO	7 (12), 1:01	Oct 3, 2009	Korakuen Hall, Tokyo, Japan	Retained OPBF super-featherweight title
12	Win	12–0	Thong Por Chokchai	TKO	5 (12), 1:05	May 2, 2009	Korakuen Hall, Tokyo, Japan	Retained OPBF super-featherweight title
11	Win	11–0	Byung-Joo Moon	TKO	4 (12), 1:55	Nov 1, 2008	Korakuen Hall, Tokyo, Japan	Retained OPBF super-featherweight title
10	Win	10–0	Hero Bando	UD	12	Jun 12, 2008	Nihon Budokan, Tokyo, Japan	Retained OPBF super-featherweight title
9	Win	9–0	Akira Yamazaki	TKO	10 (12), 1:37	Feb 2, 2008	Korakuen Hall, Tokyo, Japan	Retained OPBF super-featherweight title
8	Win	8–0	Nedal Hussein	KO	8 (12), 1:32	Sep 8, 2007	Korakuen Hall, Tokyo, Japan	Won vacant OPBF super-featherweight title
7	Win	7–0	Seung Won Baek	KO	3 (8), 2:01	Jun 2, 2007	Korakuen Hall, Tokyo, Japan	
6	Win	6–0	Muangfahlek Kiatwichian	UD	10	Feb 10, 2007	Korakuen Hall, Tokyo, Japan	
5	Win	5–0	Moses Seran	KO	3 (8), 1:45	Dec 9, 2006	Korakuen Hall, Tokyo, Japan	
4	Win	4–0	Tomoya Endo	UD	8	Sep 13, 2006	Korakuen Hall, Tokyo, Japan	
3	Win	3–0	Man Deuk Park	TKO	1 (8), 2:39	Nov 19, 2005	Korakuen Hall, Tokyo, Japan	
2	Win	2–0	Takamasa Ueno	KO	1 (6), 2:57	Sep 29, 2005	Korakuen Hall, Tokyo, Japan	
1	Win	1–0	Chandet Sithramkamhaeng	KO	1 (6), 0:35	Jul 16, 2005	Korakuen Hall, Tokyo, Japan	

== Awards ==
- Amateur
  - 2002 Amateur: Effort Award
  - 2003 Amateur: Valuable Player Award
- Professional
  - Fighter of the Year in Asia (WBA Annual Awards Dinner, 2010)
  - Boxer of the Month for March, 2011 (WBA)

== See also ==
- List of WBA world champions
- List of super featherweight boxing champions
- List of Japanese boxing world champions
- Boxing in Japan

Sporting positions
Regional boxing titles
Vacant Title last held by Yusuke Kobori	OPBF super-featherweight champion September 8, 2007 – December 2009; Vacated	Vacant Title next held by Koji Kawamura
World boxing titles
Preceded by Juan Carlos Salgado	WBA super-featherweight champion January 11, 2010 – February 21, 2015; Promoted	Vacant Title next held by Javier Fortuna as Regular champion
Vacant Title last held by Acelino Freitas	WBA super-featherweight champion Super title February 21, 2015 – April 27, 2016	Succeeded by Jezreel Corrales
