= Emanuel López =

Guatemalan boxer

Emanuel Lopez
Personal information
- Nickname: Pollo
- Born: Noé Emanuel López de León; February 22, 1990 (age 36) Guatemala City, Guatemala
- Height: 5 ft 6 in (168 cm)
- Weight: Super featherweight; Lightweight

Boxing career
- Stance: Orthodox

Boxing record
- Total fights: 47
- Wins: 30
- Win by KO: 14
- Losses: 16
- Draws: 1

Noé Emanuel López de León (born 22 February 1990) is a Guatemalan professional boxer who held the interim WBA super featherweight title in 2015.

== Professional career ==
Lopez turned pro in 2010 and had a record 17–4–1 before challenging and beating Colombia boxer Carlos Padilla for the interim WBA super featherweight title. He was stripped of the title for not defending it against mandatory challenger Jezreel Corrales.

== Professional boxing record ==
47 fights	30 wins	16 losses
By knockout	14	8
By decision	16	8
Draws	1	

No.	Result	Record	Opponent	Type	Round, time	Date	Location	Notes
47	Loss	30–16–1	Justin Gandoza	TKO	3 (10)	2023-02-25	Nezahualcóyotl, México State, Mexico	
46	Loss	30–15–1	Jamin Hernandez Mercado	KO	2 (10), 0:57	2022-08-20	Arena Neza, Ciudad Nezahualcoyotl, Mexico	
45	Loss	30–14–1	Steve Claggett	KO	4 (8), 0:35	2021-08-27	Hotel Holiday Inn, Cuernavaca, Mexico	
44	Loss	30–13–1	Denilson Jair Valtierra	KO	3 (10), 3:02	2021-05-14	Auditorio BB, Mexico City, Mexico	For WBC Latino Lightweight title
43	Loss	30–12–1	Ayanda Nkosi	RTD	7 (12)	2019-09-28	Portuguese Hall, Johannesburg, South Africa	For vacant WBF lightweight title
42	Loss	30–11–1	Michael Magnesi	KO	10 (12), 2:15	2019-06-21	Parco della Pace, Rome, Italy	For WBC International Silver super featherweight title
41	Win	30–10–1	Wilberth Venancio	TKO	7 (8), 1:30	2019-04-25	La Coleta, San Cristóbal de las Casas, Mexico	
40	Loss	29–10–1	Muhammadkhuja Yaqubov	UD	10	2019-02-22	KRK Uralets, Yekaterinburg, Russia	For WBC International super featherweight title
39	Win	29–9–1	Amaury Cottom	KO	3 (8), 2:48	2018-08-27	La Feria, Teopisca, Mexico	
38	Loss	28–9–1	Aram Avagyan	UD	10	2018-05-19	Pabellon Esperanza Lag, Elche, Spain	For WBC International Silver featherweight title
37	Win	28–8–1	Diego Fabian Eligio	SD	10	2018-02-17	Palenque de Gallos, Comitán, Mexico	
36	Loss	27–8–1	Carlos Diaz Ramirez	TKO	6 (10)	2017-10-14	Domo del Parque, Guadalajara, Mexico	
35	Loss	27–7–1	Shavkat Rakhimov	UD	12	2017-09-09	Traktor Ice Arena, Chelyabinsk, Russia	For vacant IBO super featherweight title
34	Win	27–6–1	Luis Zambrano	TKO	5 (10), 2:51	2017-07-21	Arena Azteca, Cintalapa, Mexico	
33	Win	26–6–1	Carlos Cardenas	UD	10	2017-06-17	Palenque de Gallos, Comitán, Mexico	
32	Win	25–6–1	Manuel Valdez	TKO	4 (10), 2:31	2017-04-28	Palenque de Gallos, Comitán, Mexico	
31	Win	24–6–1	Diego Vazquez	TKO	6 (10), 2:50	2017-03-18	Palenque de Gallos, Comitán, Mexico	
30	Win	23–6–1	Jesus Quijada	UD	10	2017-03-04	Restaurante Arroyo, Mexico City, Mexico	
29	Win	22–6–1	Antonio Moran	SD	8	2016-12-17	El Foro Chiapas, Tuxtla Gutiérrez, Mexico	
28	Win	21–6–1	Sergio Puente	UD	10	2016-10-15	Palenque de Gallos, Comitán, Mexico	
27	Loss	20–6–1	Edgar Puerta	MD	10	2016-07-16	Centro Recinto Ferial, Metepec, Mexico	
26	Win	20–5–1	Veimar Armegol	TKO	1 (10), 1:02	2016-05-06	Palenque de Gallos, Comitán, Mexico	
25	Loss	19–5–1	Juan Jose Martinez	UD	10	2016-03-26	Arena Coliseo, Mexico City, Mexico	
24	Win	19–4–1	Rolando Giono	TKO	10 (12), 1:34	2015-06-20	Palenque de Gallos, Comitán, Mexico	Retained interim WBA super featherweight title
23	Win	18–4–1	Carlos Padilla	TKO	9 (12), 2:24	2015-03-21	Palenque Mesoamericana, Tapachula, Mexico	Won interim WBA super featherweight title
22	Win	17–4–1	Fernando Cruz	TKO	2 (10), 1:47	2015-01-03	Palenque de Gallos, Comitán, Mexico	
21	Win	16–4–1	Alexander Acosta	TKO	1 (8), 2:47	2014-12-20	Lienzo Charro, Comitán, Mexico	
20	Loss	15–4–1	Marco Isaias González	UD	10	2014-12-05	Gimnasio Municipal, Ciudad Juárez, Mexico	
19	Win	15–3–1	Randy Lozano	UD	10	2014-09-13	Unidad Deportiva, Arriaga, Mexico	
18	Draw	14–3–1	Cristóbal Cruz	PTS	10	2014-06-27	Comitán, Mexico	
17	Win	14–3	Jesus Quijada	SD	8	2014-06-14	Arena Jorge Cuesy, Tuxtla Gutiérrez, Mexico	
16	Loss	13–3	Sergio Puente	SD	8	2014-03-22	Arena Monterrey, Monterrey, Mexico	
15	Loss	13–2	Jose Zepeda	KO	3 (10), 2:59	2013-12-21	Casino Hipódromo Agua Caliente, Tijuana, Mexico	
14	Win	13–1	Adalberto Borquez	UD	8	2013-10-19	Auditorio Municipal, Cabo San Lucas, Mexico	
13	Win	12–1	Devis Pérez	TKO	7 (10)	2013-07-27	Comitán, Mexico	
12	Loss	11–1	Eduardo Torres	UD	8	2013-06-22	Unidad Deportiva Inalámbrica, Mérida, Mexico	
11	Win	11–0	Julio David Roque Ler	UD	10	2013-06-14	Salon Los Laureles, Comitán, Mexico	
10	Win	10–0	Francisco Rojo	UD	8	2013-04-27	Centro de Convenciones, Mérida, Yucatán, Mexico	
9	Win	9–0	Luis Miguel Montano	UD	8	2013-03-15	Ciudad del Carmen, Mexico	
8	Win	8–0	Gerardo Cuevas	TKO	9 (10)	2012-10-06	Comitán, Mexico	
7	Win	7–0	Cesar Soriano Berumen	MD	12	2012-05-18	Palenque de Gallos, Comitán, Mexico	
6	Win	6–0	Sammy Ventura	UD	12	2012-02-03	Palenque de Gallos, Comitán, Mexico	
5	Win	5–0	Jose Calleca	UD	4	2011-12-17	Arena Jorge Cuesy, Tuxtla Gutiérrez, Mexico	
4	Win	4–0	Ivan Martinez	KO	2 (10)	2011-08-05	Comitán, Mexico	
3	Win	3–0	Braulio Lopez	UD	12	2011-02-18	Palenque de Gallos, Comitán, Mexico	
2	Win	2–0	Braulio Lopez	PTS	10	2010-12-04	Comitán, Mexico	
1	Win	1–0	Marcos Monjarez	KO	3 (4)	2010-07-29	Comitán, Mexico	

Achievements
Vacant Title last held by Bryan Vázquez	WBA super featherweight champion Interim title March 21, 2015 – 2015	Vacant Title next held by Jezreel Corrales
