= Frank Martin (boxer) =

American boxer (born 1995)

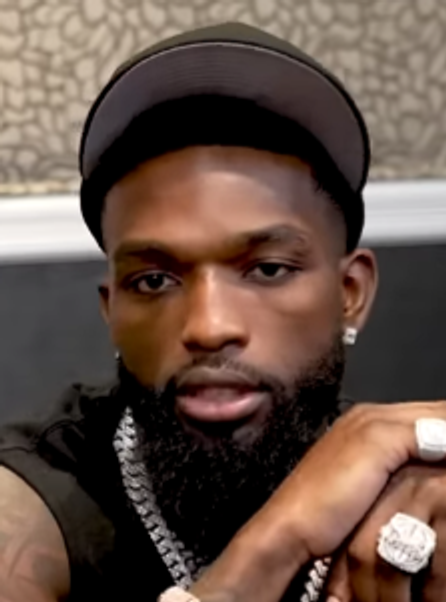
- Martin in 2024

Personal information
- Nickname: The Ghost
- Born: Frank Lamar Martin; 12 January 1995 (age 31) Detroit, Michigan, U.S.
- Height: 5 ft 8 in (173 cm)
- Weight: Lightweight; Light welterweight

Boxing career
- Reach: 68 in (173 cm)
- Stance: Southpaw

Boxing record
- Total fights: 22
- Wins: 20
- Win by KO: 14
- Losses: 1
- Draws: 1
Medal record
Men's amateur boxing
Golden Gloves
Gold medal – first place	2016 Salt Lake City	Super lightweight
National Championships
Silver medal – second place	2016 Kansas City	Super lightweight

Frank Lamar Martin (born January 12, 1995) is an American professional boxer. He challenged for the WBA lightweight title in 2024 and has held the NABO light-welterweight title since October 2026.

== Professional career ==
=== 2021 ===
Martin had the first step-up fight of his career on April 20, 2021, as he was booked to face fellow unbeaten prospect Jerry Perez in the main event of a Fox Sports 1 broadcast card, which took place at the Shrine Exposition Hall in Los Angeles, California. He won the fight by a seventh-round knockout, as he floored Perez with a looping left hook. Martin landed more than twice the amount of punches his opponent had, outlanding Perez 100 to 47. He was up on the scorecards at the time of the stoppage, with two judges awarding him every previous round of the bout, while the third judge scored all but one of the rounds in his favor.

Martin was booked to face Ryan Kielczweski in the featured bout of the preliminary portion of the Manny Pacquiao vs. Yordenis Ugás FOX Sports pay-per-view, which took place on August 21, 2021, at the T-Mobile Arena in Paradise, Nevada. He won the fight by a dominant unanimous decision, with all three judges scoring every round of the bout for him. Martin landed 198 total punches throughout the ten-round affair, while Kielczweski was able to land only 54 of the 322 punches he threw.

=== 2022 ===
On December 14, 2021, the Philippines-based Sanman Promotions announced that the twice-defeated Romero Duno would be Frank Martin's next opponent. The fight was scheduled to take place on January 1, 2022, on the undercard of the Luis Ortiz and Charles Martin Showtime pay-per-view. Duno's head coach Osmiri Fernandez threw in the towel at the 2:54 minute mark of the fourth round, after Martin had twice knocked Duno down. He was up 30–27 on all three of the judges' scorecards at the time of the stoppage.

Martin was expected to face the one-time WBA super featherweight title challenger Ricardo Núñez on July 9, 2022, as the opener of the Mark Magsayo versus Rey Vargas Showtime triple-header. Núñez withdrew from the fight on July 5, due to visa issues, and was replaced by the twice-defeated Jackson Maríñez. Martin won the fight by a tenth-round knockout. He twice knocked Maríñez down, once in the ninth and once in the tenth round. Martin was up on the scorecards, with scores of 88–82, 88–82 and 87–83.

Martin faced the unbeaten Michel Rivera on December 17, 2022, at the Cosmopolitan of Las Vegas in Las Vegas, Nevada in the main event of a Showtime broadcast card. Both fighters were ranked as top ten lightweights by The Ring at the time of the bout's booking. He won the fight by unanimous decision, with scores of 120–107, 117–110 and 118–109. Martin scored the sole knockdown of the bout in the seventh round, as he dropped Rivera with a counter left straight.

=== 2023 ===
Martin faced the undefeated 2016 Olympics bronze medalist Artem Harutyunyan in the main event of a Showtime broadcast card, which took place at Cosmopolitan of Las Vegas in Paradise, Nevada on July 15, 2023. He won the fight by a narrow unanimous decision. Two of the judges scored the fight 115–112 for Martin, while the third ringside official scored the contest 114–113 in his favor. Martin was able to knock Harutyunyan down in the final round.

On August 26, 2023, the WBC ordered Martin to face the former two-weight world champion Shakur Stevenson for the vacant lightweight title.

=== 2024–2026 ===
On June 15, 2024, Martin faced WBA lightweight champion Gervonta Davis at the MGM Grand Garden Arena, Paradise, Nevada. He lost by knockout in round eight. It was Martin's first loss in his professional career.

After almost 18 months away from the competitive boxing ring, Martin returned with a fourth round knockout win over Rances Barthelemy at Frost Bank Center in San Antonio, Texas, on December 6, 2025.

On February 21, 2026, Martin and Nahir Albright fought to a unanimous draw at T-Mobile Arena in Paradise, Nevada. Martin defeated Tarik Zaina via technical knockout in the seventh round to win the vacant NABO light-welterweight title at Frost Bank Center in San Antonio, Texas, on October 24, 2026.

== Professional boxing record ==
22 fights	20 wins	1 loss
By knockout	14	1
By decision	6	0
Draws	1	

No.	Result	Record	Opponent	Type	Round, time	Date	Location	Notes
22	Win	20–1–1	Tarik Zaina	TKO	7 (10), 2:38	Oct 24, 2026	Frost Bank Center, San Antonio, Texas, U.S.	Won vacant NABO light-welterweight title
21	Draw	19–1–1	Nahir Albright	UD	10	Feb 21, 2026	T-Mobile Arena, Paradise, Nevada, U.S.	
20	Win	19–1	Rances Barthelemy	KO	4 (10), 2:56	Dec 06, 2025	Frost Bank Center, San Antonio, Texas, U.S.	
19	Loss	18–1	Gervonta Davis	KO	8 (12), 1:29	Jun 15, 2024	MGM Grand Garden Arena, Paradise, Nevada, U.S.	For WBA lightweight title
18	Win	18–0	Artem Harutyunyan	UD	12	Jul 15, 2023	Cosmopolitan of Las Vegas, Las Vegas, Nevada, U.S.	
17	Win	17–0	Michel Rivera	UD	12	Dec 17, 2022	Cosmopolitan of Las Vegas, Las Vegas, Nevada, U.S.	
16	Win	16–0	Jackson Maríñez	TKO	10 (10), 2:30	Jul 9, 2022	Alamodome, San Antonio, Texas, U.S.	
15	Win	15–0	Romero Duno	TKO	4 (10), 2:54	Jan 1, 2022	Seminole Hard Rock Hotel & Casino Hollywood, Hollywood, Florida, U.S.	
14	Win	14–0	Ryan Kielczweski	UD	10	Aug 21, 2021	T-Mobile Arena, Paradise, Nevada, U.S.	
13	Win	13–0	Jerry Perez	KO	7 (10), 2:59	Apr 20, 2021	Shrine Exposition Hall, Los Angeles, California, U.S.	
12	Win	12–0	Tyrone Luckey	KO	5 (8), 2:13	Dec 5, 2020	AT&T Stadium, Arlington, Texas, U.S.	
11	Win	11–0	Reymond Yanong	TKO	4 (6), 0:50	Feb 28, 2020	Sam's Town Hotel & Gambling Hall, Las Vegas, Nevada, U.S.	
10	Win	10–0	Pablo Cupul	KO	2 (6), 0:37	Aug 24, 2019	The SportZone, Indianapolis, Indiana, U.S.	
9	Win	9–0	Larry Ventus	UD	6	Jun 7, 2019	Motor City Casino, Detroit, Michigan, U.S.	
8	Win	8–0	Deshawn Debose	TKO	4 (4), 0:38	Mar 9, 2019	Armory, Indianapolis, Indiana, U.S.	
7	Win	7–0	Efrain Cruz	UD	6	Feb 8, 2019	Motor City Casino, Detroit, Michigan, U.S.	
6	Win	6–0	Jermon Houck	TKO	2 (4), 2:24	Jul 13, 2018	Motor City Casino, Detroit, Michigan, U.S.	
5	Win	5–0	Kendrick Latchman	KO	2 (4), 1:57	Jun 8, 2018	Pierre's Entertainment Center, Fort Wayne, Indiana, U.S.	
4	Win	4–0	Terren Arrington	TKO	2 (4), 1:48	Apr 13, 2018	Motor City Casino, Detroit, Michigan, U.S.	
3	Win	3–0	Mundo Martinez	TKO	1 (4), 2:44	Mar 10, 2018	D1 Factory, Indianapolis, Indiana, U.S.	
2	Win	2–0	Darnell Pettis	UD	4	Dec 16, 2017	National Guard Armory, Indianapolis, Indiana, U.S.	
1	Win	1–0	John Edward Lockette	TKO	1 (4), 1:40	Oct 7, 2017	Division Armory, Indianapolis, Indiana, U.S.	

== Pay-per-view bouts ==
No.	Date	Fight	Buys	Network	Revenue
1	June 15, 2024	Martin vs. Davis	350,000	Amazon Prime Video	$26,232,506
