= Bryan Vázquez =

Costa Rican boxer

Personal information
- Nickname: El Tiquito
- Born: August 26, 1987 (age 38) San José, Costa Rica
- Height: 5 ft 5 in (165 cm)
- Weight: Featherweight; Super featherweight; Lightweight

Boxing career
- Reach: 66 1/2 in (169 cm)
- Stance: Orthodox

Boxing record
- Total fights: 41
- Wins: 37
- Win by KO: 20
- Losses: 4

Bryan Vázquez (born August 26, 1987) is a Costa Rican former professional boxer.

== Professional career ==
On November 3, 2011, Vázquez defeated Santos Benavides by twelfth round unanimous decision for the interim WBA Super featherweight title. On July 21, 2012 Vázquez defeated Jorge Lacierva to earn a match against WBA World super featherweight champion, Takashi Uchiyama. This was also a match up between two boxers in The Ring Magazine's top ten Junior Lightweights, with Vázquez having recently moved into the tenth spot and Uchiyama residing in the number one spot. The match took place on New Year's Eve, 2012 in Tokyo, Japan. Vázquez was defeated by TKO when Uchiyama landed several punches to the head and the referee stopped the fight after the bell ending the eighth round. His final fight was against Puerto Rican Félix Verdejo.

== Professional boxing record ==
41 fights	37 wins	4 losses
By knockout	20	1
By decision	17	3

No.	Result	Record	Opponent	Type	Round, time	Date	Location	Notes
41	Loss	37–4	Félix Verdejo	UD	10	2019-04-20	Madison Square Garden, New York City, New York, U.S.	For vacant WBA Gold lightweight title
40	Win	37–3	Carlos Cardenas	UD	10	2018-09-14	Save Mart Center, Fresno, California, U.S.	
39	Win	36–3	Miguel Angel Gonzalez	KO	11 (12)	2018-02-24	San Pedro, Perez Zeledon	Won vacant WBA Fedelatin super-featherweight title
38	Loss	35–3	Ray Beltrán	MD	10	2017-08-05	Microsoft Theater, Los Angeles, California, U.S.	
37	Win	35–2	Angel Granados	TKO	2 (10)	2016-07-02	Gimnasio Los Naranjos, Boquete, Panama	
36	Loss	34–2	Javier Fortuna	UD	12	2015-05-29	Barclays Center, New York City, New York, U.S.	For (Regular) WBA super-featherweight title
35	Win	34–1	Sergio Thompson	RTD	9 (12), 3:00	2014-12-20	Arena Quequi, Cancún, Quintana Roo, Mexico	Interim WBA super-featherweight title only at stake for Thompson as Vásquez fails to make weight
34	Win	33–1	José Félix Jr.	UD	12	2014-04-12	MGM Grand Garden Arena, Paradise, Nevada, U.S.	Retained Interim WBA super-featherweight title
33	Win	32–1	Rene Gonzalez	TD	5 (12)	2013-10-26	Sports City Gym, San José, Costa Rica	Won Interim WBA super-featherweight title
32	Win	31–1	Eugenio Lopez	TKO	4 (10)	2013-06-29	Camara Ganadera, Liberia, Costa Rica	
31	Win	30–1	Luis Ernesto Jose	KO	1 (10)	2013-02-28	Estadio Ricardo Saprissa Aymá, Tibás, Costa Rica	
30	Loss	29–1	Takashi Uchiyama	TKO	8 (12)	2012-12-31	Ota City General Gymnasium, Ōta, Japan	For WBA super-featherweight title
29	Win	29–0	Jorge Lacierva	TKO	9 (12)	2012-07-21	Auditorio Municipal, Tijuana, Mexico	Retained Interim WBA super-featherweight title
28	Win	28–0	Santos Benavides	UD	12	2011-11-03	Pepper's Night Club, Zapote, Costa Rica	Won Interim WBA super-featherweight title
27	Win	27–0	Alan Herrera	UD	11	2011-07-30	Gimnasio Nacional, San José, Costa Rica	Won vacant WBA Fedelatin super-featherweight title
26	Win	26–0	Michael Isaac Carrero	KO	1 (10)	2011-05-27	Gimnasio Turrialba 96, Turriabla, Costa Rica	
25	Win	25–0	Santos Martinez	UD	9	2011-03-31	National Stadium, San José, Costa Rica	Won vacant WBA Fedebol super-featherweight title
24	Win	24–0	Luis Armando Juarez	UD	6	2011-01-09	Hotel & Casino Conrad, Punta del Este, Uruguay	
23	Win	23–0	Luis Acevedo	TKO	1 (4)	2010-12-11	Salon Comunal de Santa Rosa, Cartago, Costa Rica	
22	Win	22–0	Hugo Pacheco	KO	1 (6)	2010-11-25	Club El Cubano, Guachipelin, Costa Rica	
21	Win	21–0	Santos Martinez	UD	8	2010-10-08	Pepper's Night Club, Zapote, Costa Rica	
20	Win	20–0	Virgilio Saavedra	KO	1 (6)	2010-09-01	La Rumba, San Rafael District, Costa Rica	
19	Win	19–0	Juan David Sierra	TKO	7 (8)	2010-06-26	Gimnasio German Evers, Mazatlán, Mexico	
18	Win	18–0	Freddy Oporta	UD	8	2009-09-19	Torre Gecko del Mall Real Cariari, Heredia, Costa Rica	
17	Win	17–0	Erick Sandoval	TKO	1 (6)	2009-07-18	Torre Gecko del Mall Real Cariari, Heredia, Costa Rica	
16	Win	16–0	Erick Sandoval	UD	6	2009-04-18	Gimnasio Nº 1 de La Sabana, San José, Costa Rica	
15	Win	15–0	Leopoldo Arrocha	RTD	3 (8)	2008-06-30	Hotel Barcelo San Jose Palacio, San José, Costa Rica	
14	Win	14–0	Jose Gutierrez	KO	6 (11)	2008-04-19	Gimnasio Nacional, San José, Costa Rica	Won vacant WBA Fedelatin featherweight title
13	Win	13–0	Leopoldo Arrocha	UD	10	2007-12-10	Hotel Barcelo San Jose Palacio, San José, Costa Rica	
12	Win	12–0	Freddy Oporta	UD	8	2007-10-15	Hotel Barcelo San Jose Palacio, San José, Costa Rica	
11	Win	11–0	Jose Gutierrez	SD	8	2007-07-30	Hotel Barcelo San Jose Palacio, San José, Costa Rica	
10	Win	10–0	Byron Moreno	KO	3 (6)	2007-04-30	Hotel Barcelo San Jose Palacio, San José, Costa Rica	
9	Win	9–0	Juan Carlos Acosta	KO	1 (4)	2007-03-19	Hotel Barcelo San Jose Palacio, San José, Costa Rica	
8	Win	8–0	William Baca	UD	8	2006-08-21	Hotel Barcelo San Jose Palacio, San José, Costa Rica	
7	Win	7–0	Emiliano Rodriguez	UD	4	2006-06-29	Hotel Barcelo San Jose Palacio, San José, Costa Rica	
6	Win	6–0	Ramon Estrada	KO	4 (4)	2006-04-30	Hotel Barcelo San Jose Palacio, San José, Costa Rica	
5	Win	5–0	Carlos Perez	UD	4	2006-03-20	Hotel Barcelo San Jose Palacio, San José, Costa Rica	
4	Win	4–0	Byron Moreno	RTD	3 (6)	2006-02-13	Hotel Barcelo San Jose Palacio, San José, Costa Rica	
3	Win	3–0	Ramon Urbina	UD	4	2005-11-17	Hotel Barcelo San Jose Palacio, San José, Costa Rica	
2	Win	2–0	Byron Moreno	KO	2 (4)	2005-10-16	Hotel Barcelo San Jose Palacio, San José, Costa Rica	
1	Win	1–0	Yader Ortiz	KO	1 (4)	2005-09-16	Hotel Barcelo San Jose Palacio, San José, Costa Rica	

Sporting positions
Regional boxing titles
Vacant Title last held by Roinet Caballero	WBA Fedelatin featherweight champion April 19, 2008 – 2008; Vacated	Vacant Title next held by Feider Viloria
Vacant Title last held by Oswaldo Miranda	WBA Fedebol super-featherweight champion March 31, 2011 – 2011; Vacated	Vacant Title next held by Berman Sanchez
Vacant Title last held by Jaider Parra	WBA Fedelatin super-featherweight champion July 30, 2011 – November 3, 2011; Won interim title	Vacant Title next held by Aristides Pérez
Vacant Title last held by Alfredo Santiago	WBA Fedelatin super-featherweight champion February 24, 2018 – 2019; Vacated	Vacant Title next held by Pablo Vicente
World boxing titles
Vacant Title last held by Jorge Solís	WBA super-featherweight champion Interim title November 3, 2011 – December 31, 2012; Lost bid for full title	Vacant Title next held by Yuriorkis Gamboa
Vacant Title last held by Yuriorkis Gamboa	WBA super-featherweight champion Interim title October 26, 2013 – December 19, 2014; Stripped, did not make weight	Vacant Title next held by Emanuel López
