= Jezreel Corrales =

Panamanian boxer

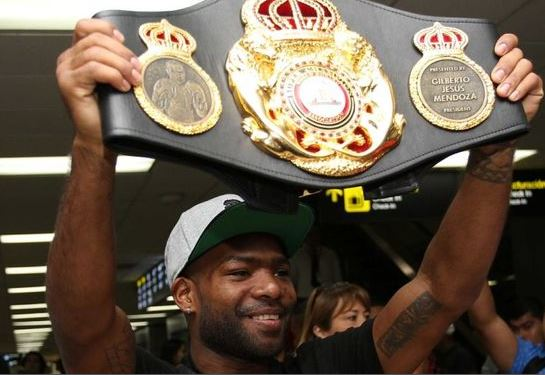

Personal information
- Nickname: El Invisible
- Born: Jezreel Corrales González; July 12, 1991 (age 35) San Miguelito, Panama
- Height: 5 ft 6 in (168 cm)
- Weight: Featherweight; Super featherweight

Boxing career
- Reach: 67 in (170 cm)
- Stance: Southpaw

Boxing record
- Total fights: 35
- Wins: 26
- Win by KO: 10
- Losses: 9
- No contests: 1

Jezreel Corrales González (born July 12, 1991) is a Panamanian professional boxer who held the WBA (Super) super featherweight title from 2016 to 2017.

== Professional career ==
Corrales made his professional debut on 2009, at the age of 17. Corrales lost his second fight by unanimous decision, being knocked down twice over four rounds. He is managed by Lesbia de Moss and trained by Juan Mosquera.

=== Corrales vs. Giono ===
In April 2012, Corrales defeated Rolando Giono by a narrow split decision (75-74, 75–74, 73-77), to become the Panamanian national featherweight champion. On 2013, one of Corrales' wins was overturned to a no contest by the Panama Boxing Commission after he tested positive for cannabis. On 2014, Corrales won the FECARBOX featherweight title, before moving up to super featherweight.

=== Corrales vs. Rodriguez ===
In December 2015, Corrales defeated Juan Antonio Rodríguez for the WBA interim super featherweight title. Corrales dominated Rodríguez from beginning to end, Rodríguez retired in his stool before round 12.

=== WBA super featherweight champion ===
==== Corrales vs. Uchiyama ====
In March 2016, it was announced that Corrales would be facing WBA (Super) champion Takashi Uchiyama on April. The fight would take place at the Ota-City Gymnasium, marking the first time Corrales fought outside Panama. In a big upset, Corrales won the world title with a second-round knockout victory Uchiyama. Uchiyama was looking to defend his world title for the twelfth time against Corrales. Corrales overwhelmed Uchiyama, knocking him down three times in round 2 before the referee waved off the fight.

==== Corrales vs. Uchiyama II ====
A rematch between Corrales and Uchiyama was agreed to for December 2016, at the same venue. Uchiyama scored a flash knockdown in round 5 but was unable to reclaim the world title, as Corrales retained with a split decision win (117–110, 115–112, 113–114).

==== Corrales vs. Castellanos ====
Corrales' second defense came against Robinson Castellanos in July 2017 at The Forum. Castellanos and Corrales traded knockdowns, with Corrales down twice in round 4 and Castellanos down in round 7, in a tense and thrilling encounter that ended prematurely as Castellanos was unable to continue due to an accidental headbutt in round 10. The fight went to the scorecards, which saw Corrales win a majority technical decision (96–92, 94–93, 94–94).

==== Corrales vs. Machado ====
Corrales lost his title against Alberto Machado on 21 October 2017 in a fight that headlined a HBO Boxing After Dark show. Machado was ranked #4 by the WBA at super featherweight. Corrales lost his title on the scales, coming in at 133.25 lb, 3.25 above the division's weight limit. Corrales started the fight dominating Machado with sharper boxing and better footwork. Machado was rocked by several punches early in the fight and he was dropped in round 5. However, Machado came out strong in round 6 and had Corrales badly hurt. Corrales resorted to holding and tackled Machado, with both fighters hit the canvas. From that point, the defending champion was unable to use his better technique to his advantage, one of his gloves touched the canvas during round 7 but the referee failed to score it a knockdown. In round 8, Machado landed a hard left hook that dropped Corrales. Corrales was unable to recover before he was counted out, giving Machado the win and the title. Machado dedicated the victory to the victims of Hurricane Maria in Puerto Rico. As Machado was interviewed by Max Kellerman, Corrales tried to interrupt and demand a rematch but he was brushed off.

==== Corrales vs. Colbert ====
On 18 January 2020, Corrales fought Chris Colbert, who was ranked #3 by the WBA at super featherweight. Colbert beat Corrales by unanimous decision in their 12 round contest The scorecards were 116–111, 117–110, 117–110 in favor of Colbert.

== Professional boxing record ==
31 fights	26 wins	4 losses
By knockout	10	1
By decision	15	3
By disqualification	1	0
No contests	1	

No.	Result	Record	Opponent	Type	Round, time	Date	Location	Notes
31	Win	26–4 (1)	Miguel Madueño	UD	12	Mar 12, 2022	Roberto Durán Arena, Panama City, Panama	
30	Win	25–4 (1)	Jesus Bravo	UD	10	Oct 15, 2021	Roberto Durán Arena, Panama City, Panama	
29	Win	24–4 (1)	Miguel Angel Martinez	KO	1 (10), 0:44	May 21, 2021	Los Andes Mall, Panama City, Panama	
28	Loss	23–4 (1)	Chris Colbert	UD	12	Jan 18, 2020	Liacouras Center, Philadelphia, Pennsylvania, U.S.	For vacant WBA interim super featherweight title
27	Loss	23–3 (1)	Ladarius Miller	SD	10	Jul 27, 2019	Royal Farms Arena, Baltimore, Maryland, U.S.	
26	Win	23–2 (1)	Onalvi Sierra	KO	2 (8), 1:00	Apr 30, 2019	Fantastic Casino de Albrook Mall, Panama City, Panama	
25	Loss	22–2 (1)	Alberto Machado	KO	8 (12), 2:18	Oct 21, 2017	Turning Stone Resort Casino, Verona, New York, U.S.	
24	Win	22–1 (1)	Robinson Castellanos	TD	10 (12), 0:31	Jul 15, 2017	The Forum, Inglewood, California, U.S.	Retained WBA (Super) super featherweight title; Majority TD after Castellanos cut from accidental head clash
23	Win	21–1 (1)	Takashi Uchiyama	SD	12	Dec 31, 2016	Ota City General Gymnasium, Tokyo, Japan	Retained WBA (Super) super featherweight title
22	Win	20–1 (1)	Takashi Uchiyama	KO	2 (12), 2:59	Apr 27, 2016	Ota City General Gymnasium, Tokyo, Japan	Won WBA (Super) super featherweight title
21	Win	19–1 (1)	Juan Antonio Rodríguez	RTD	11 (12), 3:00	Dec 17, 2015	Roberto Durán Arena, Panama City, Panama	Won vacant WBA interim super featherweight title
20	Win	18–1 (1)	Felix Sabez	TKO	2 (10), 2:13	Jul 23, 2015	Centro de Convenciones Atlapa, Panama City, Panama	Won vacant WBA Fedecaribe super featherweight title
19	Win	17–1 (1)	Edgar Guillen	TKO	1 (6), 2:08	Dec 19, 2014	Gimnasio Los Naranjos, Boquete, Panama	
18	Win	16–1 (1)	Walter Estrada	TKO	1 (10), 1:06	Nov 20, 2014	Hotel RIU, Panama City, Panama	Won vacant South American super featherweight title
17	Win	15–1 (1)	Carlos Rivas	KO	2 (8), 2:06	Jul 19, 2014	Gimnasio Los Naranjos, Boquete, Panama	
16	Win	14–1 (1)	Eusebio Osejo	DQ	10 (10)	Jan 25, 2014	Gimnasio Los Naranjos, Boquete, Panama	Won vacant WBC FECARBOX featherweight title; Osejo disqualified for using illegal blows
15	NC	13–1 (1)	Jonathan Perez	NC	8	Aug 3, 2013	Roberto Durán Arena, Panama City, Panama	WBC Latino featherweight title at stake; Originally a UD win for Corrales, later ruled an NC after he failed a drug test for cannabis
14	Win	13–1	Irving Berry	UD	10	May 22, 2013	Hotel RIU, Panama City, Panama	Retained Panamanian featherweight title; Won vacant WBC Latino featherweight title
13	Win	12–1	Rene Alvarado	UD	6	Jan 24, 2013	Hotel RIU, Panama City, Panama	
12	Win	11–1	Fabian Marimon	UD	8	Sep 1, 2012	Roberto Durán Arena, Panama City, Panama	
11	Win	10–1	Antonio Fernandez	TKO	1 (8), 1:55	May 24, 2012	Roberto Durán Arena, Panama City, Panama	Retained Panamanian featherweight title; Won vacant WBC FECARBOX interim featherweight title
10	Win	9–1	Rolando Giono	SD	8	Apr 11, 2012	Hotel Veneto, Panama City, Panama	Won vacant Panamanian featherweight title
9	Win	8–1	Rolando Giono	SD	8	Nov 23, 2011	Roberto Durán Arena, Panama City, Panama	
8	Win	7–1	Javier Coronado	UD	8	Aug 11, 2011	Roberto Durán Arena, Panama City, Panama	
7	Win	6–1	Jose Forero	MD	6	Jun 2, 2011	Hotel Veneto, Panama City, Panama	
6	Win	5–1	Omar Anderson	UD	6	Feb 10, 2011	Centro de Convenciones Atlapa, Panama City, Panama	
5	Win	4–1	Roris Samudio	TKO	1 (4), 1:55	Dec 18, 2010	Jardin La Union, La Chorrera, Panama	
4	Win	3–1	Saul Cedeno	UD	4	Aug 5, 2010	Hotel Veneto, Panama City, Panama	
3	Win	2–1	Antonio Luy	UD	4	Jun 17, 2010	Discoteca Dubai, Panama City, Panama	
2	Loss	1–1	Jhonatan Arenas	UD	4	Apr 30, 2009	Roberto Durán Arena, Panama City, Panama	
1	Win	1–0	Johnatan Calderon	UD	4	Feb 13, 2009	Sala de Eventos La Eskina, Panama City, Panama	

Sporting positions
Regional boxing titles
Vacant Title last held by Jhonatan Arenas	Panamanian featherweight champion April 11, 2012 – November 2013; Vacated	Vacant Title next held by Bryan De Gracia
Vacant Title last held by Lizardo Moreno	WBC FECARBOX featherweight champion Interim title May 24, 2012 – September 2012; Vacated	Vacant Title next held by Angel Fret
Vacant Title last held by Óscar Escandón	WBC Latino featherweight champion May 22, 2013 – September 2013; Vacated	Vacant Title next held by Celestino Caballero
Vacant Title last held by Andrés Gutiérrez	WBC FECARBOX featherweight champion January 25, 2014 – June 2014; Vacated	Vacant Title next held by Josec Ruiz
Vacant Title last held by Jans Nasem Barrera	South American super featherweight champion November 20, 2014 – December 2014; Vacated	Vacant Title next held by Mauricio Javier Munoz
Vacant Title last held by Rolando Giono	WBA Fedecaribe super featherweight champion July 25, 2015 – December 17, 2015; Won interim title	Vacant Title next held by Jaime Arboleda
World boxing titles
Vacant Title last held by Emanuel Lopez	WBA super featherweight champion Interim title December 17, 2015 – April 27, 2016; Won super title	Vacant
Preceded by Takashi Uchiyama	WBA super featherweight champion Super title April 27, 2016 – October 20, 2017; Stripped	Vacant Title next held by Gervonta Davis
