= Luis Cruz (boxer) =

Puerto Rican boxer

Personal information
- Nickname: El Artesano
- Nationality: Puerto Rican
- Born: Luis A. Cruz; October 10, 1985 (age 40) Las Piedras, Puerto Rico
- Height: 5 ft 9 in (1.75 m)
- Weight: Featherweight; Super featherweight; Lightweight

Boxing career
- Stance: Orthodox

Boxing record
- Total fights: 28
- Wins: 22
- Win by KO: 16
- Losses: 5
- Draws: 1

Luis Cruz (born October 10, 1985) is a Puerto Rican professional boxer who challenged for the IBF lightweight title in 2017.

== Amateur career ==
Had 71 amateur fights. Record was 50-21. Won the National Youth title two years in a row and was on the Puerto Rican national team for two and a half, three years - on 'Team B.' It was the alternate team.

=== Highlights ===
- 2006 JOSE CHEO APONTE TOURNAMENT, Caguas, Puerto Rico, 125 pounds: in the semifinals on 3-24-06 he lost a 9-8 decision against Alex Oliveira of Brazil.
- 2006 INDEPENDENCE CUP, Santiago de los Caballeros, Dominican Republic, 125 pounds: in the quarterfinals on 3-15-05 he lost a 15-9 decision against Dario de la Cruz of Dominican Republic.
- JOSE CHEO APONTE TOURNAMENT, Caguas, Puerto Rico, 125 pounds: in his first fight on 6-3-05 he had a 9-9 draw, but lost the tiebreaker against William Silva of Brazil.

== Professional career ==
He debuted at the age of 21 on March 3, 2007 in San Juan, PR, and knocked out Jose Gonzalez (0-2) at 1:23 of the 1st round.

== Professional boxing record ==
28 fights	22 wins	5 losses
By knockout	16	1
By decision	6	4
Draws	1	

No.	Result	Record	Opponent	Type	Round, time	Date	Location	Notes
28	Loss	22–5–1	(United States) Robert Easter Jr.	UD	12	Feb 10, 2017	(United States) Huntington Center, Toledo, Ohio, U.S.	For IBF lightweight title
27	Draw	22–4–1	(Ukraine) Ivan Redkach	SD	10	Apr 19, 2016	(United States) Sands Event Center, Bethlehem, Pennsylvania, U.S.	
26	Win	22–4	(Puerto Rico) Roberto Acevedo	UD	6	Nov 14, 2015	Coliseo Rubén Rodríguez, Bayamón, Puerto Rico	
25	Loss	21–4	(The Bahamas) Edner Cherry	KO	9 (10), 0:53	Jul 11, 2015	(United States) USF Sun Dome, Tampa, Florida, U.S.	
24	Loss	21–3	(United States) Joaquin Chavez	SD	8	Aug 1, 2014	(United States) Little Creek Casino Resort, Shelton, Washington, U.S.	
23	Win	21–2	(Nicaragua) Carlos Winston Velasquez	UD	6	Mar 21, 2014	(United States) A La Carte Event Pavilion, Tampa, Florida, U.S.	
22	Loss	20–2	(Mexico) José Félix, Jr.	UD	10	Sep 13, 2012	(United States) Hard Rock Hotel and Casino, Paradise, Nevada, U.S.	
21	Win	20–1	(Mexico) Tomas Sierra	KO	1 (8), 2:32	Jun 23, 2012	Centro de Usos Multiples, Hermosillo, Mexico	
20	Loss	19–1	(Mexico) Juan Carlos Burgos	MD	10	Nov 12, 2011	(United States) MGM Grand Garden Arena, Paradise, Nevada, U.S.	Lost WBO Latino super featherweight title; For vacant WBC Silver super featherweight title
19	Win	19–0	(United States) Antonio Davis	TKO	6 (10), 1:39	Sep 10, 2011	(United States) Boardwalk Hall, Atlantic City, New Jersey, U.S.	
18	Win	18–0	(Mexico) Martin Honorio	UD	10	Apr 16, 2011	Coliseo Rubén Rodríguez, Bayamón, Puerto Rico	Retained WBO Latino super featherweight title
17	Win	17–0	(Nicaragua) Wilfredo Acuna	TKO	2 (8), 2:27	Dec 10, 2010	Coliseo Samuel Rodriguez, Aguas Buenas, Puerto Rico	
16	Win	16–0	(Colombia) Hevinson Herrera	TKO	6 (10)	Aug 28, 2010	Coliseo Ruben Viera, Las Piedras, Puerto Rico	Won vacant WBO Latino super featherweight title
15	Win	15–0	(Mexico) Juan Jose Beltran	KO	1 (6), 2:24	Jul 16, 2010	Coliseo Cosme Beitia Salamo, Cataño, Puerto Rico	
14	Win	14–0	(United States) Eric Estrada	TKO	6 (10), 1:16	Jun 4, 2010	Coliseo Rafael G Amalbert, Juncos, Puerto Rico	
13	Win	13–0	(United States) Leon Bobo	TKO	9 (10), 2:48	Feb 27, 2010	Coliseo Roger L. Mendoza, Caguas, Puerto Rico	Won vacant WBC–USNBC featherweight title
12	Win	12–0	(Colombia) Yogli Herrera	UD	10	Aug 29, 2009	Coliseo Ruben Viera, Las Piedras, Puerto Rico	
11	Win	11–0	(Colombia) Jesús Salvador Pérez	TKO	4 (10), 1:40	Jun 26, 2009	Coliseo Roger L. Mendoza, Caguas, Puerto Rico	
10	Win	10–0	(United States) Juan Jaramillo	TKO	5 (8), 2:31	May 16, 2009	Coliseo Angel 'Cholo' Espada, Salinas, Puerto Rico	
9	Win	9–0	(Puerto Rico) Carlos Diaz	TKO	6 (8), 1:26	Feb 27, 2009	Coliseo Roger L. Mendoza, Caguas, Puerto Rico	
8	Win	8–0	(Mexico) Martin Armenta	TKO	1 (6), 2:54	Oct 17, 2008	Coliseum Francisco Deyda, Hatillo, Puerto Rico	
7	Win	7–0	(Mexico) Jaime Villa	TKO	1 (6), 2:59	Jul 26, 2008	(United States) MGM Grand Garden Arena, Paradise, Nevada, U.S.	
6	Win	6–0	(United States) Miguel Albares	TKO	3 (6), 1:39	Jun 26, 2008	(United States) Mandalay Bay Events Center, Paradise, Nevada, U.S.	
5	Win	5–0	(Mexico) Olvin Mejia	UD	6	Apr 12, 2008	(United States) Boardwalk Hall, Atlantic City, New Jersey, U.S.	
4	Win	4–0	(Puerto Rico) Javier Ortiz	UD	6	Feb 1, 2008	Coliseo Rafael G Amalbert, Juncos, Puerto Rico	
3	Win	3–0	(Puerto Rico) Luis Quinones	TKO	1 (4), 0:23	Aug 11, 2007	Coliseo Angel 'Cholo' Espada, Salinas, Puerto Rico	
2	Win	2–0	(Puerto Rico) Arturo Colon	TKO	2 (4), 2:28	May 11, 2007	Coliseo Angel 'Cholo' Espada, Salinas, Puerto Rico	
1	Win	1–0	(Puerto Rico) Jose L Gonzalez	KO	1 (4), 1:23	Mar 3, 2007	Coliseo Roberto Clemente, San Juan, Puerto Rico	

Sporting positions
Regional boxing titles
Vacant Title last held by Matt Remillard	WBC–USNBC featherweight champion Feb 27, 2010 – Jun 2010; Vacated	Vacant Title next held by Daniel Ponce de León
Vacant Title last held by Gonzalo Munguia	WBO Latino super featherweight champion Aug 28, 2010 – Nov 12, 2011	Succeeded by Juan Carlos Burgos
