= Iron Mike Productions =

Boxing promotion company based in Deerfield Beach, Florida

Iron Mike Productions (formerly Acquinity Sports) was a boxing promotion company, based in Deerfield Beach, Florida, United States. Acquinity Sports was founded in 2012 by Garry Jonas, CEO of Acquinity Interactive which abruptly ceased operations in 2013 after an FTC complaint. Jonas partnered with former heavyweight champion Mike Tyson in 2013, and changed the name of the company to Iron Mike Productions. They represented a diverse roster of boxers., including two-time Iraq War Veteran and undefeated Sammy Vazquez, Jr., Ukrainian amateur world champion, Ivgen Khytrov, super bantamweight champion JC Payano, and top U.S. amateur prospect, Erickson Lubin.

== Key people ==
- Mike Tyson, Owner
- Garry Jonas, CEO - NO LONGER AFFILIATED http://dc.org/files/negative_dnssec
- Azim Spicer, COO - NO LONGER AFFILIATED

== Fighters ==
Name	Division	Nationality	
Argenis Mendez	Super Featherweight	Dominican Republic	Former IBF Super-Featherweight Championship of the World
Claudio Marrero	Featherweight	Dominican Republic	Current WBA-NABA & FEDELATIN Champion, #2 WBA, #8 IBF
Juan Carlos Payano	Bantamweight	Dominican Republic	Current WBA FEDELATIN Champion, WBA #6
Isiah Thomas	Light Heavyweight	USA	Current WBA-NABA Light Heavyweight Champion, #10 WBA
Domonique Dolton	Light Middleweight	USA	Current WBA-NABA Champion, #12 WBA
Yudel Jhonson	Light Middleweight	Cuba	2004 Olympic Silver Medalist
Felix Diaz	Welterweight	Dominican Republic	2008 Olympic Gold Medalist
Alexei Collado	Super Bantamweight	Cuba	Undefeated
Farid Aghayev	Middleweight	Azerbaijan	Undefeated
Lenin Castillo	Light Heavyweight	Dominican Republic	2008 Olympian
Moises Flores	Super Bantamweight	Mexico	Undefeated
Ed Paredes	Welterweight	USA	Current WBC Latino & WBA-NABA Champion, #3 WBA, #3 WBC, #14 IBF, #11 WBO
Humberto Savigne	Light Heavyweight	Cuba	Current WBC #7
Albert Bell	Super Featherweight	USA	Pro Debut
Joan Guzman	Light Welterweight	Dominican Republic	2X World Champion, Current #5 WBA
Erickson Lubin	Welterweight	USA	Pro Debut
Dennis Galarza	Super Featherweight	USA	Pro Debut

== Notable events ==
Acquinity Sport's debut event was held on January 7, 2012 at Hollywood’s Westin Diplomat Resort and Spa, and was featured as the season opener of Telefutura's Solo Boxeo series. Its second major event, branded "D-Day, Dominican Domination" aired on ESPN 2's Friday Night Fights on March 2, 2012, and featured headliner Joan "Baby Tyson" Guzman, who had recently signed on with Acquinity Sports. On November 30, 2012, Acquinity and bsavings.com presented a combination boxing-music event. Dubbed "Beatdown 2012," it featured a championship fight between Guzman and Khabib Allakhverdiev, followed by musical performances by Fabolous, Flo Rida, Waka Flocka, DMX, Travis Porter and Fat Joe.

== Name change ==
In 2013 Acquinity CEO Garry Jonas and former heavyweight champion Mike Tyson partnered and formed Iron Mike Productions. This marked the hall-of-famer's return to boxing since his last appearance in the ring in 2005. The new promotion company's debut took place on August 23, 2013, at the Turning Stone Resort Casino in Verona, New York, and will be broadcast live on ESPN2's Friday Night Fights.
