= Argenis Mendez =

Dominican Republic boxer (born 1986)

Personal information
- Nickname: La Tormenta
- Nationality: (Dominican Republic) Dominican
- Born: Argenis Alexander Méndez Zapata; July 3, 1986 (age 40) San Juan, Dominican Republic
- Height: 5 ft 9 in (175 cm)
- Weight: Super featherweight; Lightweight; Super lightweight

Boxing career
- Reach: 70 in (178 cm)
- Stance: Orthodox

Boxing record
- Total fights: 36
- Wins: 25
- Win by KO: 12
- Losses: 7
- Draws: 3
- No contests: 1

Argenis Alexander Méndez Zapata (born July 3, 1986) is a Dominican former professional boxer who held the International Boxing Federation super-featherweight title from 2013 to 2014. As an amateur, he won the featherweight (57 kg) silver medal at the Junior World Championships in 2004, as well as the gold medal in the same division at the 2005 Pan American Championship.

== Early life and amateur career ==
Mendez started boxing at the age of 12. At Jeju, South Korea, he won the featherweight silver medal at the World Junior Championships in 2004, where he beat Eddy Flores Cotilla before losing to Eduard Ambartsumyan in the final.

He lost in the first round of the 2004 Olympics in Athens, Greece, against the Ukrainian Maksym Tretyak. Mendez had qualified for the Olympic Games by topping the 2nd AIBA American 2004 Olympic Qualifying Tournament in Rio de Janeiro, Brazil.

In 2005, he beat Abner Cotto on his way to winning featherweight gold at the PanAm Championships, held at Teresópolis, Brazil.

He also holds several wins over Carlos Velásquez.

In Mianyang, China, he defeated Naskali Jyri Jarmo on points, 20–8, at the 2005 World Amateur Boxing Championships, but lost early against Russian amateur standout Aleksei Tishchenko, who had beaten him earlier in the year.

== Professional career ==
He debuted in 2006, knocking out Jose Fonseco in the second round at Santo Domingo in the Dominican Republic. Achieving a 12-fight win streak, mainly at super featherweight, he suffered his first defeat by a close split decision to Jaime Sandoval, wherein he knocked down Sandoval in the first round.

He came back to win 6 consecutive fight including 12-round decision victories over fringe contender Martin Honorio and former IBF super-featherweight champion Cassius Baloyi. Mendez fought Honorio on May 8, 2010, in the StubHub Center in Carson, California, winning a close majority decision with scores of 114-114, 116–112, and 116–112. Honorio pressured Mendez using body attacks, while Mendez used his superior hand speed and combination punching to counter Honorio. In an IBF super-featherweight title eliminator, Mendez fought Baloyi in Brakpan, South Africa on January 29, 2011. Mendez won a unanimous decision victory, with scores of 117–110, 117–110, and 117–111, outclassing the former champion with his speed and combination punching.

Argenis Mendez finally got his chance for the vacant IBF super-featherweight against former World Boxing Council super-featherweight champion and Jorge Linares conqueror Juan Carlos Salgado. On September 10, 2011, at Zapopan, Mexico, Mendez lost a close decision victory to Salgado. Both boxers landed good combination punches and fought competitively. Mendez lost a point in the fifth round for hitting behind the head, but was able to drop Salgado in the final round.

He had a quick bounce-back victory over Alex Perez on November 18, 2011, in Santo Domingo, winning by knockout in the second round.

In April 2012, Mendez signed for the boxing promoter Acquinity Sports alongside compatriots Félix Díaz and Gilbert Lenin Castillo.

== Professional boxing record ==
36 fights	25 wins	7 losses
By knockout	12	2
By decision	13	5
Draws	3	
No contests	1	

No.	Result	Record	Opponent	Type	Round, time	Date	Location	Notes
36	Loss	25-7-3 (1)	(Uzbekistan) Batyr Akhmedov	TKO	8 (12)	2021-06-26	(United States) State Farm Arena, Atlanta	
35	Loss	25-6-3 (1)	(Haiti) Richardson Hitchins	SD	10 (10)	2020-12-12	(United States) Mohegan Sun Casino, Uncasville	
34	Draw	25-5-3 (1)	(United States) Juan Heraldez	MD	10 (10)	2019-05-18	(United States) Barclays Center, Brooklyn	
33	Draw	25-5-2 (1)	(United States) Anthony Peterson	SD	10 (10)	2019-03-24	(United States) MGM National Harbor, Oxon Hill	
32	Win	25-5-1 (1)	(United States) Eddie Ramirez	UD	10 (10)	2018-05-26	(United States) Beau Rivage Resort & Casino, Biloxi	
31	Win	24-5-1 (1)	(Ukraine) Ivan Redkach	SD	10 (10)	2017-05-02	(United States) Sportsmans Lodge, Studio City	
30	Loss	23-5-1 (1)	(United Kingdom) Luke Campbell	UD	12 (12)	2016-07-30	(United Kingdom) First Direct Arena, Leeds	For vacant WBC Silver lightweight title
29	Loss	23-4-1 (1)	(United States) Robert Easter Jr.	TKO	5 (10)	2016-04-01	(United States) D.C. Armory, Washington	
28	Win	23-3-1 (1)	(Mexico) Miguel Vázquez	UD	10 (10)	2015-10-06	(United States) Cowboys Dance Hall, San Antonio	
27	Win	22-3-1 (1)	(Mexico) Daniel Evangelista Jr.	RTD	6 (8)	2015-02-20	(United States) PPG Paints Arena, Pittsburgh	
26	Loss	21-3-1 (1)	(Cuba) Rances Barthelemy	UD	12 (12)	2014-07-10	(United States) American Airlines Arena, Miami	Lost IBF super-featherweight title
25	NC	21-2-1 (1)	(Cuba) Rances Barthelemy	KO	2 (12)	2014-01-03	(United States) Target Center, Minneapolis	Retained IBF super-featherweight title
24	Draw	21-2-1	(Afghanistan) Arash Usmanee	MD	12 (12)	2013-08-23	(United States) Turning Stone Resort Casino, Verona	Retained IBF super-featherweight title
23	Win	21-2	(Mexico) Juan Carlos Salgado	KO	4 (12)	2013-03-09	(United States) The Hangar, Costa Mesa	Won IBF super-featherweight title
22	Win	20-2	(Mexico) Martin Honorio	UD	12 (12)	2012-07-21	(United States) Seminole Hard Rock Hotel and Casino, Hollywood	
21	Win	19-2	(Cuba) Alex Perez	TKO	2 (10)	2011-11-18	(Dominican Republic) Hotel Jaragua, Santo Domingo	
20	Loss	18-2	(Mexico) Juan Carlos Salgado	UD	12 (12)	2011-09-10	(Mexico) Universidad Autónoma de Guadalajara, Zapopan	For vacant IBF super-featherweight title
19	Win	18-1	(South Africa) Cassius Baloyi	UD	12 (12)	2011-01-29	(South Africa) Carnival City, Brakpan	
18	Win	17-1	(United States) Shamir Reyes	UD	8 (8)	2010-07-28	(United States) BB King Blues Club & Grill, New York	
17	Win	16-1	(Mexico) Martin Honorio	MD	12 (12)	2010-05-08	(United States) Home Depot Center, Carson	Won vacant USBA super-featherweight title
16	Win	15-1	(Kenya) Morris Chule	UD	8 (8)	2009-12-12	(United States) UIC Pavilion, Chicago	
15	Win	14-1	(Kenya) Anthony Napunyi	TKO	5 (8)	2009-08-26	(United States) BB King Blues Club & Grill, New York	
14	Win	13-1	(Mexico) Arturo Gomez	UD	9 (9)	2008-12-20	(Dominican Republic) Palacio de Deportes, Santo Domingo	Won WBA Fedelatin super-featherweight title
13	Loss	12-1	(United States) Jaime Sandoval	SD	8 (8)	2008-10-03	(United States) National Western Complex Arena, Denver	
12	Win	12-0	(Mexico) Jose Navarrete	SD	6 (6)	2008-06-06	(United States) Santander Arena, Reading	
11	Win	11-0	(Mexico) Oscar De La Cruz	TKO	5 (6)	2008-04-03	(United States) Aviator Sports and Events Center, Brooklyn	
10	Win	10-0	(Dominican Republic) Luis Sosa	TKO	2 (6)	2007-12-22	(Dominican Republic) Coliseo Carlos 'Teo' Cruz, Santo Domingo	
9	Win	9-0	(Cuba) Jorge Ruiz	UD	8 (8)	2007-11-09	(United States) Paradise Theater, Bronx	
8	Win	8-0	(United States) Guadalupe Guzman	UD	6 (6)	2007-09-16	(United States) Hard Rock Hotel and Casino, Las Vegas	
7	Win	7-0	(Mexico) Martin Armenta	TKO	4 (6)	2007-08-30	(United States) Grand Plaza Hotel, Houston	
6	Win	6-0	(Puerto Rico) Daniel Lorenzana	KO	2 (6)	2007-08-03	(United States) Turner Agri-Civic Center, Arcadia	
5	Win	5-0	(United States) Bobby Campbell	TKO	1 (6)	9 Jun 2007	(United States) Madison Square Garden, New York	
4	Win	4-0	(Dominican Republic) Jose de la Rosa	KO	1 (6)	2007-03-17	(Dominican Republic) Coliseo Carlos 'Teo' Cruz, Santo Domingo	
3	Win	3-0	(United States) Oscar Gonzalez	TKO	1 (4)	2007-03-03	(Puerto Rico) Coliseo Roberto Clemente, San Juan	
2	Win	2-0	(United States) Ruben Jacoby	UD	4 (4)	2007-02-17	(United States) Hammerstein Ballroom, New York	
1	Win	1-0	(Nicaragua) Jose Fonseca	KO	2 (4)	2006-12-18	(Dominican Republic) Palacio Virgilio Travieso Soto, Santo Domingo	Professional debut

== See also ==
- List of world super-featherweight boxing champions

Achievements
Preceded by Juan Carlos Salgado	IBF super-featherweight champion March 9, 2013 – July 10, 2014	Succeeded by Rances Barthelemy
