= Arash Usmanee =

Afghan born Canadian boxer

Personal information
- Nationality: (Afghanistan) Afghan (Canada) Canadian
- Born: March 3, 1982 (age 44) Afghanistan
- Height: 5 ft 8 in (173 cm)
- Weight: Junior Lightweight

Boxing career
- Reach: 74 in (188 cm)
- Stance: Orthodox

Boxing record
- Total fights: 24
- Wins: 21
- Win by KO: 10
- Losses: 2
- Draws: 1

Arash Usmanee (born March 8, 1982) is an Afghan-Canadian professional boxer. He has been ranked as high as 3rd by the WBA (World Boxing Association) and 10th by the IBF. Usmanee has been a featured fighter on ESPN's Friday Night Fights when he fought Rances Barthelemy in a bout featuring two undefeated fighters.

== Background ==
Arash Usmanee was born in Afghanistan. In 1994, his family immigrated to Canada after his father was killed by a missile.

Arash became a boxer at the age of 17. He almost qualified for the Canadian boxing team for the 2008 Summer Olympics but just missed qualifying by one point at the end of the final bell to the Turkish boxer, who barely survived the fight. That fight was a controversial loss, another one on Usmanee's record. The Turkish boxer went on to capture a bronze medal at the 2008 Summer Olympics.

Arash decided to turn pro at the end of 2008 and had his first professional fight in January 2009 against Richar Cuaran.

To become more noticed in the boxing community, he left Alberta to establish himself in Montreal.

== Professional career ==
In January 2013, Usmanee lost on points in a controversial manner to the Cuban fighter Rances Barthelemy on Friday Night Fights. According to many observers, Usmanee had won the fight clearly.

In August 2013, Usmanee received his first shot at a world title in a fight against IBF Junior Lightweight titleholder Argenis Mendez. The fight ended in a draw with one judge scoring the fight for Usmanee (115-113) and the two others scoring it a draw (114-114). The draw meant Mendez retains the title. In contrast to Usmanee's last fight, observers felt the boxer was lucky to come out with a draw.

== Professional record ==
21 Wins (10 knockouts, 11 decisions), 2 Losses (0 knockouts, 2 decisions), 1 Draw
Res.	Record	Opponent	Type	Rd., Time	Date	Location	Notes
Win	21–2–1	(United States) Juan Ruiz	MD	8	2014-06-13	(Canada) Shaw Conference Centre, Edmonton, Alberta	
Loss	20–2–1	(Mexico) Raymundo Beltrán	UD	12	2014-04-12	(United States) MGM Grand Hotel & Casino, Paradise, Nevada	For vacant WBO NABO Lightweight title
Draw	20–1–1	(Dominican Republic) Argenis Mendez	MD	12	2013-08-23	(United States) Turning Stone Resort & Casino, Verona, New York	For IBF Super Featherweight title
Loss	20–1	(Cuba) Rances Barthelemy	UD	12	2013-01-04	(United States) Magic City Casino, Miami, Florida	
Win	20–0	(Peru) Alan Paredes	TKO	3 (10), 0:45	2012-06-16	(Canada) Chapiteau CCSE Maisonneuve, Montreal, Quebec	
Win	19–0	(Uruguay) Christian Faccio	TKO	3 (8), 1:58	2012-05-04	(Canada) Chapiteau CCSE Maisonneuve, Montreal, Quebec	
Win	18–0	(United States) Chris Howard	UD	10	2012-03-17	(United States) Grand Ballroom, Atlanta, Georgia	Won vacant WBC Continental Americas Lightweight title
Win	17–0	(Netherlands) Innocent Anyanwu	UD	8	2012-02-18	(Canada) Bell Centre, Montreal, Quebec	
Win	16–0	(Portugal) Antonio Joao Bento	UD	10	2011-12-10	(Canada) Bell Centre, Montreal, Quebec	
Win	15–0	(Hungary) Laszlo Robert Balogh	TKO	3 (8), 1:48	201-08-05	(Canada) Chapiteau CCSE Maisonneuve, Montreal, Quebec	
Win	14–0	(Argentina) Sergio Javier Escobar	UD	8	2011-06-18	(Canada) Claude-Robillard Center, Montreal, Quebec	
Win	13–0	(Mexico) Alejandro Barrera	KO	5 (8), 2:58	2011-05-14	(Canada) Capri Centre, Red Deer, Alberta	
Win	12–0	(Mexico) Aldo Valtierra	UD	8	2011-04-08	(Canada) Bell Centre, Montreal, Quebec	
Win	11–0	(Mexico) Isaac Bejarano	TKO	5 (8)	2011-03-04	(Canada) Métropolis, Montreal, Quebec	
Win	10–0	(Mexico) Pedro Navarrete	UD	10	2010-12-03	(Canada) Bell Centre, Montreal, Quebec	
Win	9–0	(United States) Anthony Flores	UD	8	2010-08-10	(United States) South Philly Arena, Philadelphia, Pennsylvania	
Win	8–0	(Mexico) Genaro Garcia	KO	1 (4), 0:47	2010-09-18	(Canada) Claude-Robillard Centre, Montreal, Quebec	
Win	7–0	(Mexico) Carlos Martinez	TKO	2 (4), 1:03	2010-08-28	(Canada) Métropolis, Montreal, Quebec	
Win	6–0	(Mexico) Hugo Pacheco	TKO	2 (4), 1:28	2010-08-14	(Canada) Bell Centre, Montreal, Quebec	
Win	5–0	(Cuba) Jorge Ruiz	TD	5 (6), 2:40	2010-01-29	(United States) Mohegan Sun Casino, Uncasville, Connecticut	
Win	4–0	(United States) Willshaun Boxley	UD	4	2009-12-05	(Canada) Montreal Casino, Montreal, Quebec	
Win	3–0	(Mexico) Edwin Perez	UD	4	2009-10-16	(Canada) Northlands Agricom, Edmonton, Alberta	
Win	2–0	(United States) John Hoffman	KO	2 (4), 1:26	2009-05-29	(Canada) Palace Banquet Centre, Edmonton, Alberta	
Win	1–0	(Colombia) Richar Cuaran	KO	1 (4), 0:35	2000-04-03	(Canada) Palace Banquet Centre, Edmonton, Alberta	
