= Juan Carlos Salgado =

Mexican boxer

Personal information
- Nickname: Matador
- Nationality: (Mexico) Mexican
- Born: Juan Carlos Salgado Zambrano; December 20, 1984 (age 41) Mexico City, Mexico
- Height: 5 ft 9 in (175 cm)
- Weight: Featherweight; Super featherweight; Lightweight; Light welterweight

Boxing career
- Reach: 69 1/2 in (177 cm)
- Stance: Orthodox

Boxing record
- Total fights: 40
- Wins: 28
- Win by KO: 17
- Losses: 10
- Draws: 1
- No contests: 1

Juan Carlos Salgado Zambrano (born December 20, 1984, in Mexico City, Mexico) is a Mexican professional boxer. He is the former World Boxing Association and International Boxing Federation Super Featherweight Champion.

== Professional career ==
Juan Carlos won the World Boxing Association Super Featherweight title in sensational fashion by knocking out undefeated Venezuelan star Jorge Linares in the first round. Salgado would lose the title in his first defense to undefeated Japanese fighter Takashi Uchiyama.

== Professional boxing record ==
40 fights	28 wins	10 losses
By knockout	17	5
By decision	11	5
Draws	1	
No contests	1	

No.	Result	Record	Opponent	Type	Round, time	Date	Location	Notes
40	Loss	28–10–1 (1)	(Cuba) Orestes Velazquez	TKO	2 (8), 0:49	7 May 2022	(United States) Hialeah Park Racing & Casino, Hialeah	
39	Win	28–9–1 (1)	(Mexico) Alberto Artiga Perez	RTD	4 (6), 3:00	23 Oct 2021	(Mexico) Lienzo Charro, Pachuca	
38	Loss	27–9–1 (1)	(United States) Vergil Ortiz Jr.	KO	3 (10), 1:52	23 Jun 2018	(United States) Belasco Theater, Los Angeles	
37	Loss	27–8–1 (1)	(United States) Logan Yoon	UD	10	23 Mar 2018	(United States) Seminole Hard Rock Hotel & Casino, Hollywood	For NABO Youth super-lightweight title
36	Win	27–7–1 (1)	(Mexico) Juan Bedolla Orozco	UD	8	13 Oct 2017	E.D. Cuauhtemoc, Mexico City	
35	Loss	26–7–1 (1)	(Haiti) Evens Pierre	UD	11	16 Nov 2016	(Haiti) Karibe Convention Center, Pétion-Ville	For WBA Fedelatin lightweight title
34	Loss	26–6–1 (1)	(Mexico) Dante Jardón	UD	12	26 Mar 2016	Arena Coliseo, Mexico City	For WBC International Silver lightweight title
33	Loss	26–5–1 (1)	(Mexico) Jairo Lopez	SD	10	31 Jan 2015	Arena Coliseo, Mexico City	
32	Loss	26–4–1 (1)	(Japan) Takahiro Ao	UD	10	22 Oct 2014	(Japan) Yoyogi National Gymnasium, Tokyo	
31	Loss	26–3–1 (1)	(Mexico) Miguel Roman	TKO	11 (12), 1:42	9 Nov 2013	(Mexico) Convention Center, Coacalco	For WBC International Silver lightweight title
30	Loss	26–2–1 (1)	(Dominican Republic) Argenis Mendez	KO	4 (12), 0:45	9 Mar 2013	(United States) The Hangar, Costa Mesa	Lost IBF super-featherweight title
29	Win	26–1–1 (1)	(Argentina) Jonathan Victor Barros	UD	12	18 Aug 2012	(Mexico) Gimnasio Miguel Hidalgo, Puebla	Retained IBF super-featherweight title
28	Win	25–1–1 (1)	(Mexico) Martin Honorio	MD	12	28 Apr 2012	(Mexico) Grand Oasis Resort, Cancun	Retained IBF super-featherweight title
27	NC	24–1–1 (1)	(Mexico) Miguel Beltrán Jr.	NC	2 (12), 2:34	10 Dec 2011	(Mexico) Estadio Centenario, Los Mochis	Retained IBF super-featherweight title
26	Win	24–1–1	(Dominican Republic) Argenis Mendez	UD	12	10 Sep 2011	(Mexico) U.D, Guadalajara, Zapopan	Won vacant IBF super-featherweight title
25	Win	23–1–1	(Mexico) Jose Rosales	UD	10	26 Feb 2011	(Mexico) Polyforum Zam Ná, Merida	
24	Win	22–1–1	(Mexico) Jose Rosales	TKO	4 (10), 1:22	26 Jun 2010	(Mexico) Estadio Centenario, Los Mochis	
23	Loss	21–1–1	(Japan) Takashi Uchiyama	TKO	12 (12), 2:48	11 Jan 2010	(Japan) Tokyo Big Sight, Tokyo	Lost WBA super-featherweight title
22	Win	21–0–1	(Venezuela) Jorge Linares	TKO	1 (12), 1:13	10 Oct 2009	(Japan) Yoyogi National Gymnasium, Tokyo	Won WBA super-featherweight title
21	Win	20–0–1	(Mexico) Angel Reyna	KO	1 (8)	23 May 2009	(Mexico) Arena Monterrey, Monterrey	
20	Win	19–0–1	(Mexico) Cristian Favela	UD	6	24 Jan 2009	(United States) Staples Center, Los Angeles	
19	Win	18–0–1	(Mexico) Ivan Valle	UD	10	29 Jun 2007	(United States) Cliff Castle Casino, Camp Verde	
18	Win	17–0–1	(Mexico) Marcos Licona	UD	6	18 Nov 2006	(United States) Thomas & Mack Center, Las Vegas	
17	Win	16–0–1	(Mexico) Adalberto Borquez	TKO	1 (6), 2:36	22 Sep 2006	(United States) Convention Center, Pasadena	
16	Win	15–0–1	(Venezuela) Alirio Rivero	TKO	2 (12), 2:44	26 May 2006	(Mexico) Plaza del Sol, Mexicali	
15	Win	14–0–1	(Mexico) Ismael Gonzalez	TKO	5 (12), 1:43	24 Feb 2006	(Mexico) Sindicato Nacional de Trabajador, Tlalnepantla	
14	Draw	13–0–1	(Nicaragua) Berman Sanchez	PTS	12	17 Nov 2005	(Costa Rica) Hotel Barcelo San Jose Palacio, San Jose	For WBA Fedecentro super-featherweight title
13	Win	13–0	(Mexico) Guadalupe Hernandez	TKO	5 (10)	22 Jul 2005	(Mexico) Salon Marbet Plus, Ciudad Nezahualcoyotl	
12	Win	12–0	(Mexico) Jose Luis Gaspar	KO	9 (12), 0:56	19 Nov 2004	(Mexico) Salon Marbet Plus, Ciudad Nezahualcoyotl	Won WBC FECARBOX featherweight title
11	Win	11–0	(Mexico) Joaquin Vargas	TKO	1 (10)	20 Aug 2004	(Mexico) Centro de Convenciones, Tlalnepantla	
10	Win	10–0	(Mexico) Isidro Salinas	TKO	1 (8)	8 Jul 2004	Salon 21, Mexico City	
9	Win	9–0	(Mexico) Ismael Ramirez	TKO	2 (8)	9 Jun 2004	Salon 21, Mexico City	
8	Win	8–0	(Mexico) Cesar Castillo	TKO	2 (6)	24 Apr 2004	(Mexico) Palenque de Gallos, Tuxtla Gutierrez	
7	Win	7–0	(Mexico) Moises Diaz	TKO	5 (6)	6 Mar 2004	Casino Real, Mexico City	
6	Win	6–0	(Mexico) Angel Navarrete	TKO	4 (6)	13 Dec 2003	Alvaro Obregon G-3 Gym, Mexico City	
5	Win	5–0	(Mexico) Rafael Checa	TKO	3 (6)	11 Oct 2003	Casino Real, Mexico City	
4	Win	4–0	(Mexico) Jorge Alberto Lopez	UD	4	28 Aug 2003	Salon La Maraka, Mexico City	
3	Win	3–0	(Mexico) Adrian Tellez	UD	4	10 Jul 2003	Centro de Espectaculos La Maraka, Mexico City	
2	Win	2–0	(Mexico) Isidro Reyes	TKO	4 (4)	8 May 2003	Foro Las Americas, Mexico City	
1	Win	1–0	(Mexico) Claudio Ricardo Flores	UD	4	13 Mar 2003	Foro Las Americas, Mexico City	Professional debut

== See also ==
- List of super-featherweight boxing champions
- List of Mexican boxing world champions

Achievements
Preceded by Jorge Linares	WBA super featherweight champion October 10, 2009 – January 11, 2010	Succeeded by Takashi Uchiyama
Vacant Title last held by Mzonke Fana	IBF super featherweight champion September 10, 2011 – March 9, 2013	Succeeded by Argenis Mendez
