= John Molina Jr. =

American boxer (born 1982)

Personal information
- Nickname: The Gladiator
- Born: December 28, 1982 (age 43) Covina, California, U.S.
- Height: 5 ft 10 in (178 cm)
- Weight: Lightweight; Light welterweight

Boxing career
- Reach: 72 in (183 cm)
- Stance: Orthodox

Boxing record
- Total fights: 39
- Wins: 30
- Win by KO: 24
- Losses: 9

John Molina Jr. (born December 28, 1982) is an American former professional boxer who competed from 2006 to 2019. He challenged twice for world titles; the WBC lightweight title in 2012 and the unified WBC and WBO light welterweight titles in 2016.

== Professional career ==
On April 24, 2010 in the HBO undercard of Chris Arreola vs Tomasz Adamek, Molina beat veteran Jose Antonio Izquierdo by second round K.O.

He fought against undefeated Henry Lundy on ESPN's Friday Night Fights for the WBO NABO Lightweight Championship. During the fight with Lundy, Molina would pressure him and would knockout the Philadelphia fighter in the eleventh round.

In May 2011, John stopped the tough veteran Alejandro Rodríguez to win the vacant WBC USNBC Lightweight Championship with his next fight was a T.K.O. victory on ESPN against Robert Frankel.

After knocking out Dannie Williams in another Friday Night Fights appearance in January 2013, Molina would lose to an undefeated Andrey Klimov by majority decision in June 2013.

After the Klimov loss, Molina fought unbeaten Cleveland lightweight Mickey Bey on the main event of a Mayweather Promotions card broadcast on ShoBox from Hard Rock Casino in Las Vegas on Friday, July 19, 2013. Bey controlled most of the bout up until the 10th and final round, in which Molina hurt Bey with a left hook, and then continued to pound him with hard shots until referee Vic Drakulich stepped in to call a halt to the bout at 2:01 of the 10th round. This round is to be considered by many round of the year for 2013.

Molina was defeated by Adrien Broner via unanimous decision in the first episode of the Premier Boxing Champions series of fights on NBC.

=== First world title shot ===
On September 8, 2012, John Molina Jr. got his first world title shot, in a bout against Mexican Antonio DeMarco for the WBC lightweight title. Immediately, Molina was tagged and hurt by a straight left hand from DeMarco, the first shot DeMarco landed. Molina covered up in his corner as DeMarco pelted him until Referee Jack Reiss called a halt to the bout. The end came before 44 seconds had passed in the first round, handing Molina his second career loss. The stoppage would not come without protest where Molina Jr was sitting on the ropes during this time and was expecting to get a standing eight count.

=== Second world title shot ===
On December 10, 2016, Molina Jr fought Terence Crawford for the WBC, WBO and The Ring light welterweight titles. Crawford dominated throughout the fight. In the eighth round, Crawford hurt Molina Jr badly with a body shot, which made Molina Jr backtrack, and paved the way for a finish for Crawford. Crawford was hitting Molina Jr from all sides which made the referee stop the fight.

Molina Jr bounced back in his next fight, against Ivan Redkach. Molina Jr once again was a part of a very entertaining fight. After he got dropped in the second round by Redkach, Molina Jr returned the favor, once in the third and once in the fourth round. The referee stopped the fight in the fourth, with 1:27 left on the clock.

In his next fight, Molina Jr faced Omar Figueroa Jr. Figureoa Jr outperformed Molina Jr, and controlled the pace for most of the fight with his superior jab. All three judges had scored the fight comfortably in favor of Figueroa Jr, 99-91, 98-92 and 97-93.

On September 28, 2019, Molina Jr battled former world title challenger Josesito Lopez. Lopez dropped Molina Jr twice in the opening round, and controlled most of the opening rounds of the fight. Molina Jr showed some fight during the middle rounds, but Lopez managed to drop him for the third time in the seventh round. As Molina Jr looked hurt, the referee informed him that the first clean shot he takes in the following rounds, would mean an end to the fight. That is exactly what happened in the eighth, and Lopez was awarded the eighth-round TKO win.

== Bare-knuckle boxing ==
In March 2026, Molina Jr. signed a multi-fight deal with BKB Bare Knuckle Boxing.

== Professional boxing record ==
39 fights	30 wins	9 losses
By knockout	24	4
By decision	6	5

No.	Result	Record	Opponent	Type	Round, time	Date	Location	Notes
39	Loss	30–9	Josesito López	TKO	8 (12), 0:39	Sep 28, 2019	Staples Center, Los Angeles, California, U.S.	
38	Loss	30–8	Omar Figueroa Jr.	UD	10	Feb 16, 2019	Microsoft Theater, Los Angeles, California, U.S.	
37	Win	30–7	Ivan Redkach	KO	4 (10), 1:27	Dec 15, 2017	Pioneer Event Center, Lancaster, California, U.S.	
36	Loss	29–7	Terence Crawford	TKO	8 (12), 2:32	Dec 10, 2016	CenturyLink Center, Omaha, Nebraska, U.S.	For WBC, WBO, and The Ring light welterweight titles
35	Win	29–6	Ruslan Provodnikov	UD	12	Jun 11, 2016	Turning Stone Resort Casino, Verona, New York, U.S.	Won vacant WBO International light welterweight title
34	Win	28–6	Jorge Romero	TKO	3 (10), 0:47	Nov 28, 2015	The Bomb Factory, Dallas, Texas, U.S.	
33	Loss	27–6	Adrien Broner	UD	12	Mar 7, 2015	MGM Grand Garden Arena, Paradise, Nevada, U.S.	
32	Loss	27–5	Humberto Soto	UD	10	Sep 13, 2014	MGM Grand Garden Arena, Paradise, Nevada, U.S.	
31	Loss	27–4	Lucas Matthysse	KO	11 (12), 0:22	Apr 26, 2014	StubHub Center, Carson, California, U.S.	For vacant WBC Continental Americas light welterweight title
30	Win	27–3	Jorge Pimentel	KO	2 (8), 2:59	Nov 16, 2013	Citizens Business Bank Arena, Ontario, California, U.S.	
29	Win	26–3	Mickey Bey	TKO	10 (10), 2:01	Jul 19, 2013	The Joint, Paradise, Nevada, U.S.	
28	Loss	25–3	Andrey Klimov	MD	10	Jun 7, 2013	Little Creek Casino Resort, Shelton, Washington, U.S.	
27	Win	25–2	Dannie Williams	KO	4 (10), 2:16	Jan 11, 2013	Pueblo Pavilion at the Santa Fe Indian School, Santa Fe, New Mexico, U.S.	
26	Loss	24–2	Antonio DeMarco	TKO	1 (12), 0:44	Sep 8, 2012	Oracle Arena, Oakland, California, U.S.	For WBC lightweight title
25	Win	24–1	Miguel Angel Munguia	UD	8	Jun 23, 2012	Sportsmen's Lodge, Los Angeles, California, U.S.	
24	Win	23–1	Robert Frankel	TKO	5 (10), 3:00	Jun 24, 2011	Pechanga Resort & Casino, Temecula, California, U.S.	
23	Win	22–1	José Alejandro Rodríguez	TKO	3 (10), 1:45	May 28, 2011	BlueWater Resort & Casino, Parker, Arizona, U.S.	Won vacant WBC–USNBC lightweight title
22	Win	21–1	Hank Lundy	TKO	11 (12), 2:18	Jul 9, 2010	Twin River Event Center, Lincoln, Rhode Island, U.S.	Won WBO–NABO lightweight title
21	Win	20–1	Jose Antonio Izquierdo	KO	2 (8), 2:55	Apr 24, 2010	Citizens Business Bank Arena, Ontario, California, U.S.	
20	Win	19–1	Ricardo Medina	KO	1 (8), 1:40	Mar 5, 2010	Pechanga Resort & Casino, Temecula, California, U.S.	
19	Loss	18–1	Martin Honorio	UD	10	Nov 28, 2009	Pechanga Resort & Casino, Temecula, California, U.S.	For vacant WBO–NABO and NABF lightweight titles
18	Win	18–0	Efren Hinojosa	KO	1 (8), 0:34	Sep 26, 2009	Staples Center, Los Angeles, California, U.S.	
17	Win	17–0	Frankie Archuleta	TKO	2 (8), 2:06	May 16, 2009	Oracle Arena, Oakland, California, U.S.	
16	Win	16–0	Carlos Vinan	TKO	2 (8), 2:40	Mar 27, 2009	Nokia Theatre L.A. Live, Los Angeles, California, U.S.	
15	Win	15–0	Joshua Allotey	KO	3 (8), 1:28	Feb 6, 2009	Tachi Palace Hotel & Casino, Lemoore, California, U.S.	
14	Win	14–0	Fernando Omar Lizarraga	RTD	5 (8), 3:00	Nov 20, 2008	San Manuel Indian Bingo & Casino, Highland, California, U.S.	
13	Win	13–0	Eddie Brooks	UD	6	Sep 5, 2008	Quiet Cannon, Montebello, California, U.S.	
12	Win	12–0	Luis Alfredo Lugo	TKO	4 (6), 2:15	May 23, 2008	Quiet Cannon, Montebello, California, U.S.	
11	Win	11–0	Carlos Madrid	UD	6	Mar 28, 2008	Industry Hills Expo Center, City of Industry, California, U.S.	
10	Win	10–0	Baladan Trevizo	TKO	2 (6)	Feb 15, 2008	Quiet Cannon, Montebello, California, U.S.	
9	Win	9–0	Eddie Brooks	KO	2 (6), 2:17	Dec 28, 2007	Quiet Cannon, Montebello, California, U.S.	
8	Win	8–0	Ron Boyd	TKO	1 (6), 2:28	Aug 18, 2007	Soboba Casino, San Jacinto, California, U.S.	
7	Win	7–0	Marcus Brashears	UD	6	Jun 22, 2007	Quiet Cannon, Montebello, California, U.S.	
6	Win	6–0	Rudy Paz	TKO	1 (4), 1:59	Jan 27, 2007	Honda Center, Anaheim, California, U.S.	
5	Win	5–0	Odilon Rivera	TKO	1 (4), 2:11	Nov 16, 2006	The Joint, Paradise, Nevada, U.S.	
4	Win	4–0	Julio Chavez	UD	4	Sep 14, 2006	The Orleans, Paradise, Nevada, U.S.	
3	Win	3–0	Ramiro Torres	KO	1 (4), 1:47	Jul 14, 2006	Charro Ranch, San Antonio, Texas, U.S.	
2	Win	2–0	Ignacio Flores	KO	1 (4), 0:38	May 5, 2006	Activities Center, Maywood, California, U.S.	
1	Win	1–0	Lester Balmores	KO	2 (4), 1:35	Mar 31, 2006	Activities Center, Maywood, California, U.S.	

Sporting positions
Regional boxing titles
Preceded by Hank Lundy	WBO–NABO lightweight champion July 9, 2010 – May 2011; Vacated	Vacant Title next held by Sharif Bogere
Vacant Title last held by Adrien Broner	WBC–USNBC lightweight champion May 28, 2011 – October 2011; Vacated	Vacant Title next held by Andrey Klimov
Vacant Title last held by Sharif Bogere	WBO–NABO lightweight champion January 11, 2013 – June 2013; Vacated	Vacant Title next held by Terence Crawford
Vacant Title last held by Jason Pagara	WBO International junior welterweight champion June 11, 2016 – December 10, 2016; Lost bid for world title	Vacant Title next held by Jose Zepeda
Awards
Previous: Timothy Bradley vs. Ruslan Provodnikov	The Ring Fight of the Year vs. Lucas Matthysse; 2014	Next: Francisco Vargas vs. Takashi Miura
Previous: Timothy Bradley vs. Ruslan Provodnikov	BWAA Fight of the Year vs. Lucas Matthysse; 2014	Next: Francisco Vargas vs. Takashi Miura
Previous: Robert Easter Jr. vs. Richard Commey; Round 9	PBC Round of the Year vs. Ivan Redkach; Round 3; 2017	Next: Deontay Wilder vs. Tyson Fury; Round 12
