= José Alejandro Rodríguez =

Mexican boxer (born 1988)

Personal information
- Nickname: Soma
- Born: March 17, 1988 (age 38) Guadalajara, Jalisco, Mexico
- Height: 5 ft 10 in (178 cm)
- Weight: Lightweight; Light welterweight

Boxing career
- Reach: 72 in (183 cm)
- Stance: Orthodox

Boxing record
- Total fights: 44
- Wins: 24
- Win by KO: 14
- Losses: 19
- Draws: 1

José Alejandro Rodríguez (born March 17, 1988) is a Mexican professional boxer.

== Professional career ==
On August 28, 2010, Rodríguez beat the undefeated Jhean Carlo Aparicio at the Arena Coliseo in Guadalajara, Jalisco, Mexico.

In May 2011, José lost to title contender John Molina, Jr. and his shot at the vacant WBC USNBC lightweight title.
