= Robert Frankel (boxer) =

American boxer

Personal information
- Nickname: Red Hot
- Nationality: American
- Born: Robert Frankel; June 20, 1980 (age 46) Albuquerque, New Mexico
- Height: 5 ft 8 in (173 cm)
- Weight: Light welterweight Lightweight

Boxing career
- Reach: 72 in (183 cm)
- Stance: Orthodox

Boxing record
- Total fights: 61
- Wins: 37
- Win by KO: 8
- Losses: 23
- Draws: 1
- No contests: 0

Robert Frankel (born June 20, 1980) is an American boxer.

== Professional career ==
Robert holds wins over veterans like Mike González, Michael Stewart, Ramón Montaño, Bobby Pacquiao, and Ricardo Dominguez.

On June 24, 2011, Frankel faced Mexican-American John Molina, Jr. in the main event on ESPN's Friday Night Fights.
