= José Valenzuela =

Mexican boxer (born 1999)

Personal information
- Nickname: El Rayo ("Lightning")
- Nationality: American
- Born: José Arturo Valenzuela Gastélum; 25 May 1999 (age 27) Los Mochis, Sinaloa, Mexico
- Height: 5 ft 10 in (178 cm)
- Weight: Lightweight; Light welterweight

Boxing career
- Reach: 70 in (178 cm)
- Stance: Southpaw

Boxing record
- Total fights: 19
- Wins: 16
- Win by KO: 10
- Losses: 3

José Arturo "Rayo" Valenzuela Gastélum (born 25 May 1999) is a Mexican-born American professional boxer who held the World Boxing Association (WBA) super lightweight title from 2024 to 2025.

== Professional career ==
Valenzuela turned professional in September 2018 and won his first 12 fights, eight of them by knockout. On April 16, 2022, on the undercard of Errol Spence Jr. vs. Yordenis Ugás at AT&T Stadium, he knocked out former WBC super featherweight champion Francisco Vargas in the first round.

He suffered his first defeat on September 4, 2022, an upset KO loss against Dominican challenger Edwin De Los Santos. He would also lose his next fight via controversial unanimous decision against Chris Colbert on March 25, 2023. Valenzuela scored a knockdown in the first round, and all three judges scored the fight 95–94 for Colbert. The decision was booed by the crowd; BoxingScene described it as unpopular with fans in the arena and with media covering the fight, and Bad Left Hook called it highly debatable. Valenzuela disputed the decision and sought a rematch, which Colbert initially refused before agreeing. He won the rematch on December 16, 2023, knocking Colbert out with a right hook in the sixth round, a finish that Premier Boxing Champions named its 2023 Knockout of the Year and The Ring called a Knockout of the Year contender.

=== WBA super lightweight champion ===
==== Valenzuela vs. Cruz ====
Valenzuela faced Isaac Cruz for the WBA super lightweight title at BMO Stadium in Los Angeles on August 3, 2024. Valenzuela, who entered as an underdog, won the bout by split decision to claim his first world title. It was his first fight at 140 pounds. Cruz had won the title by stopping Rolando Romero in March 2024.

==== Valenzuela vs. Russell ====
Valenzuela faced Gary Antuanne Russell in his first defense of the WBA super lightweight title at Barclays Center in Brooklyn, New York on March 1, 2025, where he lost the bout via unanimous decision.

=== Zuffa Boxing ===
==== Valenzuela vs. Torres ====
Valenzuela moved back down to lightweight for his Zuffa Boxing debut, facing Diego Torres at the Meta Apex in Enterprise, Nevada, on February 1, 2026. It was his first fight since losing the title to Russell and his first at lightweight since December 2023. He won by unanimous decision, with all three judges scoring the fight 99–91.

==== Valenzuela vs. De Los Santos 2 ====
Valenzuela faced Edwin De Los Santos in a 10-round lightweight rematch, the main event of Zuffa Boxing 08, at The Cosmopolitan in Las Vegas on June 28, 2026. He won by knockout at 2:05 of the second round. Referee Thomas Taylor ruled that a punch Valenzuela landed after the knockdown did not affect the result, and the Nevada Athletic Commission later rejected an appeal by De Los Santos's team. With the victory, Valenzuela had avenged both of his first two professional defeats, his only losses at lightweight, by knockout.

In November 2026 the WBA ordered its lightweight champion, Floyd Schofield, to make a mandatory defense against Valenzuela, then ranked No. 1 by the organization.

== Professional boxing record ==
19 fights	16 wins	3 losses
By knockout	10	1
By decision	6	2

No.	Result	Record	Opponent	Type	Round, time	Date	Location	Notes
19	Win	16–3	Edwin De Los Santos	KO	2 (10), 2:05	28 Jun 2026	The Cosmopolitan, Paradise, Nevada, U.S.	
18	Win	15–3	Diego Torres Nunez	UD	10	1 Feb 2026	Meta Apex, Enterprise, Nevada, U.S.	
17	Loss	14–3	Gary Antuanne Russell	UD	12	1 Mar 2025	Barclays Center, Brooklyn, New York, U.S.	Lost WBA super lightweight title
16	Win	14–2	Isaac Cruz	SD	12	3 Aug 2024	BMO Stadium, Los Angeles, California, U.S.	Won WBA super lightweight title
15	Win	13–2	Chris Colbert	KO	6 (12), 1:46	16 Dec 2023	Armory, Minneapolis, Minnesota, U.S.	
14	Loss	12–2	Chris Colbert	UD	10	25 Mar 2023	MGM Grand Garden Arena, Paradise, Nevada, U.S.	
13	Loss	12–1	Edwin De Los Santos	KO	3 (10), 1:08	4 Sep 2022	Crypto.com Arena, Los Angeles, California, U.S.	Lost WBC Continental Americas lightweight title
12	Win	12–0	Francisco Vargas	KO	1 (10), 1:25	16 Apr 2022	AT&T Stadium, Arlington, Texas, U.S.	Won vacant WBC Continental Americas lightweight title
11	Win	11–0	Austin Dulay	TKO	4 (10), 0:02	18 Dec 2021	Armory, Minneapolis, Minnesota, U.S.	
10	Win	10–0	Deiner Berrio	UD	10	18 Sep 2021	Mechanics Bank Arena, Bakersfield, California, U.S.	
9	Win	9–0	Donte Strayhorn	TKO	4 (8), 1:29	21 Aug 2021	T-Mobile Arena, Paradise, Nevada, U.S.	
8	Win	8–0	Nelson Hampton	KO	1 (8), 2:59	15 May 2021	Dignity Health Sports Park, Carson, California, U.S.	
7	Win	7–0	Clay Burns	KO	4 (8), 2:57	27 Feb 2021	Shrine Auditorium, Los Angeles, California, U.S.	
6	Win	6–0	Zack Kuhn	KO	1 (6), 1:48	29 Aug 2020	Microsoft Theater, Los Angeles, California, U.S.	
5	Win	5–0	Charles Clark	KO	1 (4), 1:06	28 Sep 2019	Staples Center, Los Angeles, California, U.S.	
4	Win	4–0	Eric Manriquez	UD	4	23 Jun 2019	Michelob Ultra Arena, Paradise, Nevada, U.S.	
3	Win	3–0	Christian Velez	KO	4 (4), 1:40	16 Mar 2019	AT&T Stadium, Arlington, Texas, U.S.	
2	Win	2–0	Hugo Rodriguez	UD	4	13 Oct 2018	CHI Health Center, Omaha, Nebraska, U.S.	
1	Win	1–0	Humberto Tellez	UD	4	22 Sep 2018	Sam's Town Hotel, Sunrise Manor, Nevada, U.S.	

== See also ==
- List of southpaw stance boxers
- List of Mexican boxing world champions
- List of world light-welterweight boxing champions

Sporting positions
Regional boxing titles
Vacant Title last held by Michel Rivera	WBC Continental Americas lightweight champion 16 April 2022 – 4 September 2022	Succeeded by Edwin De Los Santos
World boxing titles
Preceded by Isaac Cruz	WBA super lightweight champion 3 August 2024 – 1 March 2025	Succeeded by Gary Antuanne Russell
