= Edwin De Los Santos =

Dominican boxer (born 1999)

Personal information
- Nationality: Dominican
- Born: 7 October 1999 (age 26) Santo Domingo, Dominican Republic
- Height: 5 ft 8 in (173 cm)
- Weight: Lightweight

Boxing career
- Reach: 70 in (178 cm)
- Stance: Southpaw

Boxing record
- Total fights: 20
- Wins: 17
- Win by KO: 15
- Losses: 3

Edwin De Los Santos is a Dominican professional boxer who currently competes at lightweight. De Los Santos is also well known for his punching power, possessing an 88% KO-to-win ratio. He possesses a notable knockout win over future light-welterweight world champion José Valenzuela.

== Amateur career ==
According to De Los Santos, he only lost 12 times in over 100 fights. He also said he traveled the world as part of the Dominican Republican national team.

== Professional career ==
After winning the first 13 fights of his career all in his native Dominican Republic, De Los Santos made his U.S. debut at T-Mobile Arena in Las Vegas, Nevada. He faced unbeaten American William Foster III. Despite starting off strong, Foster turned the fight around and hurt De Los Santos in the final round. Two judges scored the fight in Foster's favor, handing De Los Santos his first defeat by split decision. De Los Santos rebounded with a second-round stoppage against unbeaten Luis Acosta. He then faced highly touted unbeaten José Valenzuela on the undercard of Andy Ruiz vs. Luis Ortiz. De Los Santos recovered from a first-round knockdown to knock Valenzuela down in the second and third rounds for a shock third-round stoppage win.

=== De Los Santos vs Stevenson ===
After Devin Haney announced he was vacating his belts, De Los Santos faced two-weight world champion Shakur Stevenson for the WBC lightweight title on November 16, 2023. In what was a remarkably inactive fight, De Los Santos lost by unanimous decision, resulting in Stevenson becoming a three-weight world champion.

=== Canceled Bout vs. Keyshawn Davis ===
After more than a year of inactivity, De Los Santos was scheduled to face WBO lightweight champion Keyshawn Davis at the Scope Arena in Norfolk, Virginia, on June 7, 2025. After failing to make the correct weight limit, Davis was stripped of the title, meaning only De Los Santos was eligible to win it. Subsequently, the two sides entered a lengthy negotiation in an effort to keep the main event intact. The fight was ultimately canceled after the two sides couldn't come to an agreement.

=== Zuffa Boxing ===
De Los Santos was scheduled to face José Valenzuela in a 10-round lightweight rematch at Zuffa Boxing 8 at the The Cosmopolitan in Paradise, Nevada, on June 28, 2026. He lost by knockout in the second round.

== Professional boxing record ==
20 fights	17 wins	3 losses
By knockout	15	1
By decision	2	2

No.	Result	Record	Opponent	Type	Round, time	Date	Location	Notes
20	Loss	17–3	José Valenzuela	KO	2 (10), 2:05	28 Jun 2026	The Cosmopolitan, Paradise, Nevada, U.S.	
19	Win	17–2	Eliot Chavez	TKO	1 (8), 0:45	13 Dec 2025	Coliseo Carlos 'Teo' Cruz, Santo Domingo, Dominican Republic	
18	Loss	16–2	Shakur Stevenson	UD	12	16 Nov 2023	T-Mobile Arena, Las Vegas, Nevada, US	For vacant WBC lightweight title
17	Win	16–1	Joseph Adorno	UD	10	8 Jul 2023	Boardwalk Hall, Atlantic City, New Jersey, US	
16	Win	15–1	José Valenzuela	KO	3 (10), 1:08	4 Sep 2022	Crypto.com Arena, Los Angelas, California, US	
15	Win	14–1	Luis Acosta	KO	2 (8), 0:48	Mar 11 2022	Deadwood Mountain Grand, Deadwood, South Dakota, US	
14	Loss	13–1	William Foster III	SD	8	7 Jan 2022	Caribe Royal Casino, Orlando, Florida, US	
13	Win	13–0	Marco Acevedo	TKO	3 (8), 1:25	15 May 2021	Santo Domingo, Dominican Republic	
12	Win	12–0	Luis Montana Alvarez	TKO	1 (10), 2:43	13 Mar 2021	Santo Domingo, Dominican Republic	
11	Win	11–0	Pedro Verdu	KO	2 (8), 0:45	16 Dec 2020	Santo Domingo, Dominican Republic	
10	Win	10–0	Juan Alberto Garcia Perez	TKO	1 (9), 1:02	22 Feb 2020	Santiago de los Caballeros, Dominican Republic	
9	Win	9–0	Andres Bens Zapata	TKO	1 (8), 2:43	12 Oct 2019	Nagua, Dominican Republic	
8	Win	8–0	Antoni Armas	TKO	1 (9), 0:52	25 May 2019	Yamasa, Dominican Republic	
7	Win	7–0	Jonatan Mariano	KO	1 (6), 0:52	27 Apr 2019	Santo Domingo, Dominican Republic	
6	Win	6–0	Francisco Contreras Lopez	UD	6	16 Mar 2019	Santo Domingo, Dominican Republic	
5	Win	5–0	Manuel Botis	KO	1 (6), 0:35	30 Nov 2018	Santo Domingo, Dominican Republic	
4	Win	4–0	Hector Nivar	KO	2 (4), 2:16	9 Nov 2018	Santo Domingo, Dominican Republic	
3	Win	3–0	Ray Acosta Olivero	TKO	2 (4), 1:10	6 Oct 2018	Santiago de los Caballeros, Dominican Republic	
2	Win	2–0	Carlos Antigua	TKO	2 (4), 2:41	30 Aug 2018	Santiago de los Caballeros, Dominican Republic	
1	Win	1–0	Jose Vidal Sanchez	KO	2 (4), 1:50	25 Aug 2018	San Ignacio de Sabaneta, Dominican Republic	
