= Isaac Cruz =

Mexican boxer (born 1998)

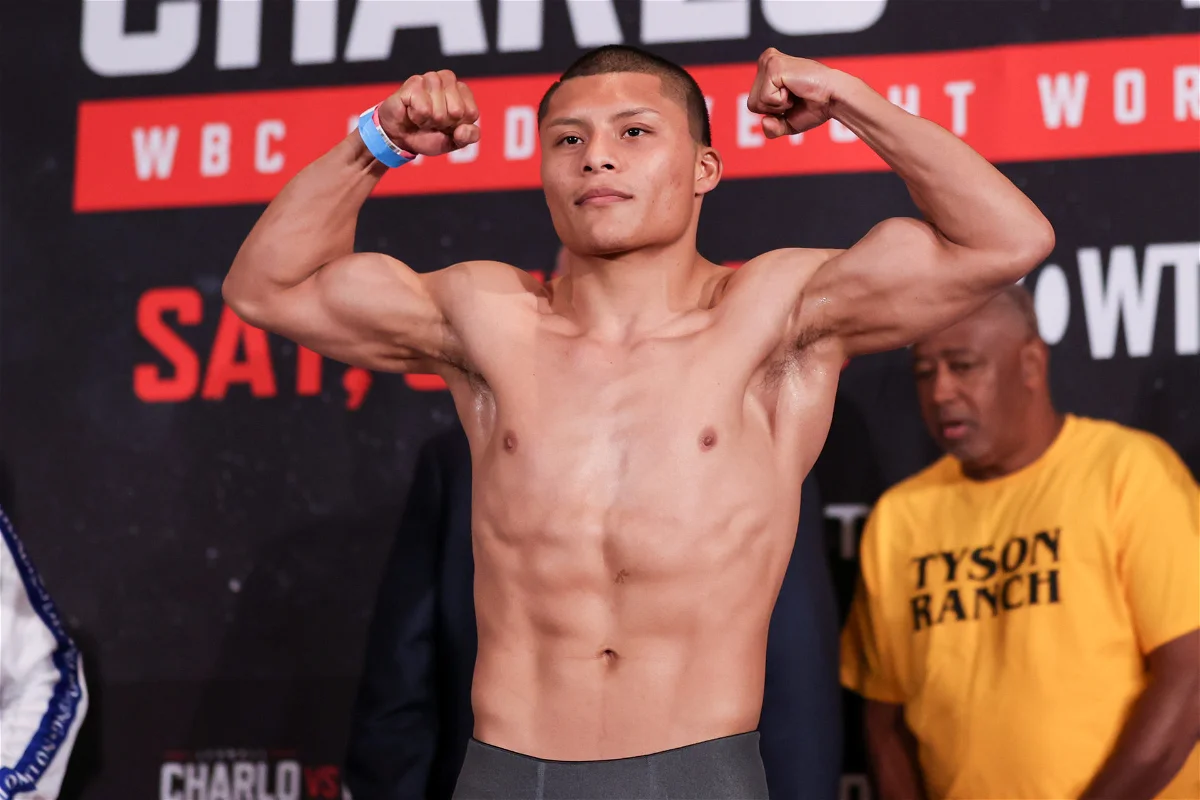

Personal information
- Nickname: Pitbull
- Born: Isaac Jonathan Cruz González; 23 May 1998 (age 28) Mexico City, Mexico
- Height: 5 ft 4 in (163 cm)
- Weight: Lightweight; Light welterweight

Boxing career
- Reach: 63 1/2 in (161 cm)
- Stance: Orthodox

Boxing record
- Total fights: 34
- Wins: 29
- Win by KO: 19
- Losses: 3
- Draws: 2

Isaac Jonathan Cruz González (born May 23, 1998) is a Mexican professional boxer who has held the World Boxing Council (WBC) interim super lightweight since July 2025. He also previously held the World Boxing Association (WBA) super lightweight title in 2024.

== Professional career ==
=== Early career ===
==== Cruz vs. Magdaleno ====
After amassing a professional record of 19–1–1, Cruz took on former world title contender Diego Magdaleno on the undercard of Gervonta Davis vs. Léo Santa Cruz on 31 October 2020 at the Alamodome in San Antonio, Texas. Cruz took just 53 seconds to stop Magdaleno in the first round of the bout.

==== Cruz vs. (Matias) Romero ====
In his next fight on 13 March 2021, Cruz took on Jose Matias Romero in a WBA lightweight title eliminator at the Mohegan Sun Arena in Uncasville, Connecticut. In a sloppy affair that saw Cruz docked a point in round six for a low blow, he prevailed by unanimous decision, with scores of 114–113, 115–112 and 118–109 all in his favor.

==== Cruz vs. Vargas ====
On 19 June 2021, Cruz took on former WBC super featherweight champion Francisco Vargas on the undercard of Jermall Charlo vs. Juan Macias Montiel. With 30 seconds left in the fight, Cruz opened up a serious cut over Vargas' right eye with an accidental headbutt, but the fight was allowed to continue. With roughly 17 seconds left in the fight, Cruz landed a left-right combination that sent Vargas to the canvas (Showtime's onscreen clock accidentally reset to 1:00 minute and started late, so it is not entirely clear when the knockdown occurred). Although the latter was able to finish out the fight and hear the final bell, Cruz prevailed as the winner via wide unanimous decision, with scores of 97–92, 99–90 and 100–89 all in his favor.

==== Cruz vs. Davis ====
WBA (Regular) lightweight champion Gervonta Davis had originally been slated to face Rolando Romero on 5 December 2021. However, when Romero was pulled from the bout due to sexual harassment allegations made against him, Cruz was announced as Davis' replacement opponent and was brought in at 2 weeks notice. It was the first time that Cruz was headlining a pay-per-view bout. The fight was a tightly contested affair, with the judges' scorecards reading 115–113, 115–113 and 116–112 in Davis' favor, resulting in the second loss of Cruz's professional career. Nevertheless, Cruz became the only second fighter after Germán Meraz to go the distance with Davis; as a result from Davis fighting the bout with a broken hand.

=== WBO (Inter-Continental) Lightweight Title ===
==== Cruz vs. Gamboa ====
Cruz rebounded from his loss against Davis on 16 April 2022, when he knocked down former unified featherweight champion Yuriorkis Gamboa multiple times en route to a fifth-round technical knockout victory at the AT&T Stadium in Arlington, Texas on the undercard of Errol Spence Jr. vs. Yordenis Ugás. And with that 23rd win, Cruz also won the (then) vacant WBO Inter-Continental lightweight title.

=== WBC (Silver) Lightweight Title and WBO (Latino) Lightweight Title ===
==== Cruz vs. Ramirez ====
Then on 4 September 2022, and serving as the co-main event feature of the Andy Ruiz vs Luis Ortiz fight, the Mexican Pit bull (Cruz) and southpaw featherweight Eduardo Ramirez—who was bravely coming up in weight—clashed for the then-vacant WBC Silver lightweight title. On fight-night, Ramirez utilized a well-educated jab, lateral movement, and smart-clinching to stave off Cruz's habitual come-forward pressure for the majority of the first round with Cruz sparsely landing proper right and left hooks whenever he could get in range. In the second round, Cruz adjusted to Ramirez's movements and began landing body shots in more frequency which had his opposition visibly slow down in his tracks and rely heavily on a clinching tactic. And in that same (2nd) round, Cruz pressured Ramirez to the ropes and scored a knock-down thanks to him feinting a left hook to Ramirez's liver before bringing it up top and landing that same left hook to Ramirez's exposed chin. Ramirez got up before referee Jack Reiss could finish the 10-count, but the southpaw was obviously still disoriented from that knock-down. Less than 30 seconds later Cruz pressured Ramirez to the ropes once again and ultimately knocked him out with a left hook and right cross combination.

==== Cruz vs Cabrera ====
Making the first defense of his WBC (Silver) lightweight title, Cruz took on Illinois' own southpaw Mexican-American boxer Giovanni "El Cabron" Cabrera on the 29th of July, 2023, at the T-Mobile Arena, Paradise, Nevada, United States. Their fight also served as the co-main event feature of the Errol Spence vs Terence Crawford Undisputed Welterweight bout and as a WBC and WBA Lightweight Title Eliminator. As well as on the line for their fight was the (then) vacant WBO (Latino) lightweight title.

On the night of the fight, despite the odds making it seem as if though it would be another Cruz domination, the bout turned out to be a closely contested affair as Cruz edged out a split decision victory over his scheduled opponent with two judges scoring it 115-112 and 114–113 in his favor while the third judge scored it 114–113 in favor of Cabrera.

The first 6 rounds saw Cabrera utilize his height and greater arm reach, as well as some good lateral movement, to keep Cruz at bay and pepper him with southpaw (right) jabs and check-hooks. And for the most part during that time, Cruz's signature come-forward pressure worked against him as Cabrera repeatedly circled to his right to keep the Mexican Pit-bull circling and unable to properly erase the gap between them. And whenever Cruz did manage to close the distance, and consequently land right and left hooks to the head and body, Cabrera would clinch and completely halt Cruz's offensive success.

From the 7th round onward, whether it had been because of fatigue or because of the body shots that Cruz managed to land across the first 6 rounds, Cabrera abandoned his footwork and opted to stand toe-to-toe with Cruz. This change in tactics played heavily into Cruz's favor because his superior in-fighting acumen and tight high-guard blocked and deflected most of Cabrera's punches and allowed him to land thudding right and left hooks and uppercuts in return. To Cabrera's credit, he showed a sturdy-chin as he never once looked like he was overly-hurt from the combinations Cruz was landing on him. And this pattern of Cruz hitting Cabrera and Cabrera clinching in response would go on to repeat itself across the remainder of the fight up until the latter half of the 12th and final round when Cabrera once again used his footwork and longer reach to keep circling Cruz and hit him with jabs and one-two combinations.

Back in the 8th round, Cruz was deducted a point because of the way his head repeatedly clashed with Cabrera's every time he closed in to attack. This point deduction ultimately led to the fight and the judge's scores to be a lot closer.

Regardless of it being generally considered by the boxing world to be bad performance from Cruz, he won the bout, retained his WBC (Silver) lightweight title and acquired the vacant WBO (Latino) lightweight title as well as the 25th victory of his professional boxing career.

=== WBA Super-Lightweight Champion ===
==== Romero vs. Cruz ====
On the 30th of March, 2024, at the T-Mobile Arena in Paradise, Nevada, United States, Cruz went on to make his Super-Lightweight debut by facing Rolando "Rolly" Romero in Romero's first defense of his WBA super-lightweight title. In the Press Conference, Rolando Romero was making fun of Isaac Cruz because of his ears calling him "Chihuahua Cruz" and Romero wore a chain with the face of Cruz with big ears like a Chihuahua.

Cruz started off strong in their scheduled 12-round bout by clocking Romero with a hard left hook in the 1st round that buckled his knees and had him stumbling backwards to the ropes. To Romero's credit, he managed to gather his wits quickly enough and staved off being knocked out by clinching Cruz and boxing at a distance right after.

Across the following 4 rounds, Cruz's relentless pressure and ever-prominent combination punching was visibly taking its toll on the champion as Romero found himself more and more relying on his clinching strategy. In the 5th round, the clinching ended up being so repetitive that the bout's referee, Thomas Taylor, ended up deducting 1 point from Romero.

From thereon forward, Cruz's domination heightened tenfold now that he had the luxury to be free of being clinched whenever he began landing his barrages on Romero. And the end came in the 8th round when Cruz, courtesy of spiteful left hook, rocked Romero to such an extent that he could not block or move away from the following 5 consecutive left and right haymakers that all landed flush on his chin and jaw.

With that emphatic victory, Cruz was crowned the WBA Champion of the Super-Lightweight division.

==== Cruz vs. Valenzuela ====
Cruz made his first defense of his WBA super lightweight title against José Valenzuela at BMO Stadium in Los Angeles on August 3, 2024. He lost the bout by split decision.

==== Cruz vs. Fierro ====
Cruz faced Angel Fierro in a 10-round super lightweight bout at T-Mobile Arena in Las Vegas on February 1, 2025. Cruz won the fight by unanimous decision (98–92, 97–93, 96–94). The WBC created an honorary title for this fight dubbed the WBC Aztec Warrior title.

==== Cruz vs. Salcido ====
Cruz was scheduled to face Angel Fierro in a rematch on July 19, 2025, at MGM Grand Garden Arena in Paradise, Nevada. On the day of the weigh-in, it was announced that Fierro had withdrawn due to a "medical emergency" and was replaced by Omar Salcido Gamez. Cruz won by unanimous decision to claim the WBC interim super-lightweight title.

==== Cruz vs. Roach Jr. ====
Cruz made the first defense of his title against Lamont Roach Jr. ar Frost Bank Center in San Antonio, Texas, on December 6, 2025, with the fught ending in a majority draw. He knocked his opponent to the canvas in the third round and, after 12 completed rounds, one ringside judge scored the contest 115–111 in his favour, while the other two had it a 113–113 tie.

==== Cruz vs. Bravo ====
Cruz knocked out Nestor Bravo in the sixth round of their fight at Pechanga Arena in San Diego, California, on September 19, 2026, to successfully defend his title for a second time.

== Professional boxing record ==
34 fights	29 wins	3 losses
By knockout	19	0
By decision	10	3
Draws	2	

No.	Result	Record	Opponent	Type	Round, time	Date	Location	Notes
34	Win	29–3–2	Nestor Bravo	KO	6 (12), 1:30	19 Sep 2026	Pechanga Arena, San Diego, California, U.S.	Retained WBC interim super lightweight title
33	Draw	28–3–2	Lamont Roach Jr.	MD	12	6 Dec 2025	Frost Bank Center, San Antonio, Texas, U.S.	Retained WBC interim super lightweight title
32	Win	28–3–1	Omar Salcido	UD	10	19 Jul 2025	MGM Grand Garden Arena, Paradise, Neveda, U.S.	Won vacant WBC interim super lightweight title
31	Win	27–3–1	Angel Fierro	UD	10	1 Feb 2025	T-Mobile Arena, Paradise, Neveda, U.S.	
30	Loss	26–3–1	José Valenzuela	SD	12	3 Aug 2024	BMO Stadium, Los Angeles, California, U.S.	Lost WBA super lightweight title
29	Win	26–2–1	Rolando Romero	TKO	8 (12), 0:56	30 Mar 2024	T-Mobile Arena, Paradise, Nevada, U.S.	Won WBA super lightweight title
28	Win	25–2–1	Giovanni Cabrera	SD	12	29 Jul 2023	T-Mobile Arena, Paradise, Nevada, U.S.	Retained WBC Silver lightweight title; Won vacant WBO Latino lightweight title
27	Win	24–2–1	Eduardo Ramirez	KO	2 (12), 2:27	4 Sep 2022	Crypto.com Arena, Los Angeles, California, U.S.	Won vacant WBC Silver lightweight title
26	Win	23–2–1	Yuriorkis Gamboa	TKO	5 (10), 1:32	16 Apr 2022	AT&T Stadium, Arlington, Texas, U.S.	Won vacant WBO Inter-Continental lightweight title
25	Loss	22–2–1	Gervonta Davis	UD	12	5 Dec 2021	Staples Center, Los Angeles, California, U.S.	For WBA (Regular) lightweight title
24	Win	22–1–1	Francisco Vargas	UD	10	19 Jun 2021	Toyota Center, Houston, Texas, U.S.	
23	Win	21–1–1	Jose Matias Romero	UD	12	13 Mar 2021	Mohegan Sun Arena, Uncasville, Connecticut, U.S.	
22	Win	20–1–1	Diego Magdaleno	KO	1 (12), 0:53	31 Oct 2020	Alamodome, San Antonio, Texas, U.S.	
21	Win	19–1–1	Thomas Mattice	MD	10	14 Feb 2020	2300 Arena, Philadelphia, Pennsylvania, U.S.	
20	Win	18–1–1	Miguel Angel Perez Aispuro	UD	8	7 Dec 2019	Barclays Center, New York City, New York, U.S.	
19	Win	17–1–1	Eleazar Valenzuela	KO	1 (10), 2:20	16 Feb 2019	Plaza de Toros La Coleta, San Cristóbal de las Casas, Mexico	
18	Win	16–1–1	Jose Felix	TKO	3 (8), 2:11	10 Nov 2018	Lienzo Charro Hermanos Ramírez, Corregidora, Mexico	
17	Win	15–1–1	Jose Angel Flores Chan	KO	1 (8), 2:44	6 Oct 2018	Arena Coliseo, Mexico City, Mexico	
16	Win	14–1–1	Heberto Persico	UD	8	16 Jun 2018	Auditorio Centenario, Gómez Palacio, Durango, Mexico	
15	Win	13–1–1	Juan Jose Martinez Alvarez	RTD	5 (8), 3:00	17 Feb 2018	Arena Coliseo, Mexico City, Mexico	
14	Win	12–1–1	Ricardo Juan Saenz	TKO	2 (6), 0:56	11 Nov 2017	Inforum, Irapuato, Mexico	
13	Draw	11–1–1	Jose Calyecac	PTS	6	30 Sep 2017	Centro Regional de Deporte de Las Américas, Ecatepec, Mexico	
12	Win	11–1	Dunis Liñán	TKO	7 (8), 0:55	1 Jul 2017	Auditorio Centenario, Gómez Palacio, Durango, Mexico	
11	Win	10–1	Ivan Basurto Monroy	TKO	3 (6), 2:55	22 Apr 2017	Unidad Deportiva Martín Alarcón, Metepec, Mexico	
10	Win	9–1	Raul Hinojosa	TKO	6 (8), 0:39	3 Dec 2016	Centro de Convenciones, Acapulco, Mexico	
9	Win	8–1	Daniel Evangelista Jr	TKO	3 (6), 2:17	22 Oct 2016	Arena Coliseo, Mexico City, Mexico	
8	Win	7–1	Carlos Marcelino Santiago	KO	1 (6), 0:47	27 Aug 2016	Arena Coliseo, Mexico City, Mexico	
7	Win	6–1	Italo Ortiz	TKO	1 (6), 0:31	2 Apr 2016	Centro de Convenciones, Tlalnepantla, Mexico	
6	Loss	5–1	Luis Miguel Montaño	UD	8	6 Feb 2016	Arena Coliseo, Mexico City, Mexico	
5	Win	5–0	Francisco Valadez	MD	6	5 Sep 2015	Centro de Espectáculos del Recinto Ferial, Metepec, Mexico	
4	Win	4–0	Rafael Lopez Garcia	KO	1 (4), 0:22	8 Aug 2015	Arena Coliseo, Mexico City, Mexico	
3	Win	3–0	Jose Eduardo Zamudio	TKO	3 (4), 1:47	27 Jun 2015	Centro Civico de Ecatepec, Ecatepec, Mexico	
2	Win	2–0	Brandon Gonzalez	SD	4	23 May 2015	Centro de Espectáculos del Recinto Ferial, Metepec, Mexico	
1	Win	1–0	Luis Yan Revilla	KO	1 (4), 1:30	14 Mar 2015	Auditorio Municipal, Naucalpan, Mexico	

== Titles in boxing ==
=== Major world titles ===
- WBA super lightweight champion (140 lbs)

=== Interim world titles ===
- WBC interim super lightweight champion (140 lbs)

=== Silver world titles (Note: In 2010, the WBC created the "Silver Championship", intended as a replacement for interim titles.) ===
- WBC Silver lightweight champion (135 lbs)

=== Regional/International titles ===
- WBO Inter-Continental lightweight champion (135 lbs)
- WBO Latino lightweight champion (135 lbs)

=== Honorary titles ===
- WBC Guerrero Azteca champion

== See also ==
- List of Mexican boxing world champions
- List of world light-welterweight boxing champions

== Notes and references ==
=== References ===
Sporting positions
Regional boxing titles
Vacant Title last held by Vasiliy Lomachenko	WBO Inter-Continental lightweight Champion; April 16, 2022 – 2022; Vacated	Vacant Title next held by Keyshawn Davis
Vacant Title last held by Zaur Abdullaev	WBC Silver lightweight Champion; September 4, 2022 – March 30, 2024; Won world title	Vacant Title next held by Mark Chamberlain
Vacant Title last held by Miguel Madueno	WBO Latino lightweight Champion; July 29, 2023 – March 30, 2024; Won world title	Vacant Title next held by Alan Abel Chaves
World boxing titles
Preceded by Rolando Romero	WBA super lightweight champion March 30 – August 3, 2024	Succeeded by José Valenzuela
Vacant Title last held by Alberto Puello	WBC super lightweight champion Interim title July 19, 2025 – present	Incumbent
