= Mario Barrios vs. Ryan Garcia =

Boxing competition

- Date: February 21, 2026
- Venue: T-Mobile Arena, Paradise, Nevada, U.S.
- Title(s) on the line: WBC welterweight title

Tale of the tape
Boxer	Mario Barrios	Ryan Garcia
Nickname	El Azteca	King Ry
Hometown	San Antonio, Texas, U.S.	Victorville, California, U.S.
Pre-fight record	29–2–2 (18 KOs)	24–2 (1) (20 KOs)
Age	30 years, 9 months	27 years, 6 months
Height	6 ft (183 cm)	5 ft 8 in (173 cm)
Style	Orthodox	Orthodox
Recognition	WBC welterweight champion The Ring; No. 4 Ranked Welterweight	Former WBC interim lightweight champion

Result
- Garcia wins via unanimous decision (119–108, 120–107, 118–109)

Mario Barrios vs. Ryan Garcia billed as The Ring: High Stakes was a welterweight professional boxing match contested between WBC welterweight champion Mario Barrios, and former WBC interim lightweight champion Ryan Garcia. The bout took place on February 21, 2026 at T-Mobile Arena in Paradise, Nevada, U.S. The event was shown live and exclusively on DAZN PPV worldwide. Garcia defeated Barrios by twelve round unanimous decision, with scores of 119–108, 120–107, and 118–109.

== Background ==
On January 12, 2026, it was officially announced that Mario Barrios would defend his WBC welterweight title against Ryan Garcia. Barrios was coming off back-to-back consecutive draws against Abel Ramos and Manny Pacquiao, leading to questions about his standing atop the division.

== The Fight ==
Garcia scores a knockdown within 30 seconds of the opening fight with an overhand right.

After twelve rounds of domination, all three judges awarded Garcia the victory by scores of 120–107, 119–108, and 118–109, making him the new WBC welterweight champion.

Shortly after victory, Garcia calls out Shakur Stevenson for a potential bout in the future.

== Fight card ==
Confirmed bouts:

Weight class		vs.		Method	Round	Time	Notes
Main card (DAZN PPV)
Welterweight	Ryan Garcia	def.	Mario Barrios (c)	UD	12	3:00	^{Note 1}
Super lightweight	Gary Antuanne Russell (c)	def.	Andy Hiraoka	UD	12	3:00	^{Note 2}
Super lightweight	Frank Martin	vs.	Nahir Albright	UD	10	3:00
Super middleweight	Bektemir Melikuziev	def.	Sena Agbeko	TKO	7 (10)	2:58	^{Note 3}
Middleweight	Amari Jones	def.	Luís Arias	RTD	4 (10)	3:00
Preliminary card (YouTube)
Super featherweight	Mohammed Alakel	def.	David Calabro	TKO	2 (6)	2:27
Heavyweight	Joshua Edwards	def.	Brandon Colantonio	UD	6	3:00

^Note 1 For WBC welterweight title
^Note 2 For WBA super lightweight title
^Note 3 For vacant WBA Continental Americas super middleweight title
