= Diego Magdaleno =

American boxer

Personal information
- Nickname: 2 Fuego
- Born: Diego Armando Magdaleno; October 28, 1986 (age 39) Los Angeles, California, U.S.
- Height: 5 ft 7 in (170 cm)
- Weight: Super featherweight; Lightweight

Boxing career
- Reach: 70 in (178 cm)
- Stance: Southpaw

Boxing record
- Total fights: 36
- Wins: 32
- Win by KO: 13
- Losses: 4
Medal record
Men's Boxing
US National Championships
Gold medal – first place	2007 Colorado Springs	Lightweight

Diego Armando Magdaleno (born October 28, 1986) is an American professional boxer. He challenged for the WBO super featherweight title in 2013 and the WBO lightweight title in 2015. At regional level, he held the WBC-NABF super featherweight title from 2011 to 2012. He's also the brother of boxer Jesús Magdaleno. He has been ranked in the top ten of The Ring magazine's super featherweight ratings.

== Early life ==
He was named after Diego Maradona and is the brother of boxer Jesús Magdaleno.

== Professional career ==
He is signed to Bob Arum's Top Rank. In April 2010, Diego won a ten-round decision over Manuel Perez

After receiving a top ten Super Featherweight ranking by the Ring Magazine, Magdaleno beat contender Alejandro Pérez.

== Professional boxing record ==
36 fights	32 wins	4 losses
By knockout	13	3
By decision	19	1

No.	Result	Record	Opponent	Type	Round, time	Date	Location	Notes
36	Loss	32–4	Isaac Cruz	KO	1 (12), 0:53	Oct 31, 2020	Alamodome, San Antonio, Texas, U.S.	
35	Win	32–3	Austin Dulay	UD	10	Feb 15, 2020	Bridgestone Arena, Nashville, Tennessee, U.S.	
34	Loss	31–3	Teófimo López	KO	7 (10), 1:08	Feb 2, 2019	The Ford Center at The Star, Frisco, Texas, U.S.	For WBC-NABF, IBF-USBA, and vacant WBA-NABA (USA) lightweight titles
33	Win	31–2	Jesus Cuadro	UD	10	Sep 22, 2018	Grand Oasis Arena, Cancún, Mexico	
32	Win	30–2	Emmanuel Herrera	TKO	5 (8), 2:19	May 19, 2018	Poliforum, Playa del Carmen, Mexico	
31	Win	29–2	Art Hovhannisyan	UD	10	Oct 7, 2016	Belasco Theater, Los Angeles, California, U.S.	
30	Loss	28–2	Terry Flanagan	TKO	2 (12), 2:38	Oct 10, 2015	Manchester Arena, Manchester, England	For WBO lightweight title
29	Win	28–1	Jose A Gonzalez	TKO	7 (12), 2:43	Jun 26, 2015	State Farm Arena, Hidalgo, Texas, U.S.	Won vacant WBO International lightweight title
28	Win	27–1	Hevinson Herrera	TKO	3 (10), 2:53	Nov 8, 2014	Pharr Events Center, Pharr, Texas, U.S.	
27	Win	26–1	Oscar Bravo	UD	8	May 17, 2014	The Forum, Inglewood, California, U.S.	
26	Win	25–1	Jorge Pazos	KO	4 (10), 2:27	Feb 2, 2014	C. Robert Lee Center, Hawaiian Gardens, California, U.S.	
25	Win	24–1	Edgar Riovalle	UD	10	Sep 29, 2013	StubHub Center, Carson, California, U.S.	
24	Loss	23–1	Román Martínez	SD	12	Apr 6, 2013	CotaiArena, Ilhas, Macau	For WBO super featherweight title
23	Win	23–0	Antonio Davis	TKO	4 (10), 2:59	Aug 4, 2012	Texas Station Casino, North Las Vegas, Nevada, U.S.	Retained WBC-NABF super featherweight title
22	Win	22–0	Fernando Beltran	TKO	7 (10), 2:28	Mar 23, 2012	Casino Del Sol, Tucson, Arizona, U.S.	Retained WBC-NABF super featherweight title
21	Win	21–0	Emmanuel Lucero	UD	10	Nov 11, 2011	Mandalay Bay Resort & Casino, Paradise, Nevada, U.S.	Retained NABF-WBC super featherweight title
20	Win	20–0	Alejandro Perez	UD	10	Sep 15, 2011	Texas Station Casino, North Las Vegas, Nevada, U.S.	Retained WBC-NABF super featherweight title
19	Win	19–0	Gilberto Sánchez	TKO	3 (12), 0:49	May 6, 2011	Mandalay Bay Resort & Casino, Paradise, Nevada, U.S.	Retained WBC-NABF super featherweight title
18	Win	18–0	Marcos Leonardo Jimenez	TKO	5 (12), 3:00	Jan 22, 2011	Texas Station, North Las Vegas, Nevada, U.S.	Won WBC-NABF super featherweight title
17	Win	17–0	Derrick Campos	TKO	4 (8), 1:15	Nov 6, 2010	MGM Grand, Paradise, Nevada, U.S.	
16	Win	16–0	Carlos Oliveira	TKO	5 (8), 1:13	Sep 11, 2010	Palms Casino Resort, Paradise, Nevada, U.S.	
15	Win	15–0	Manuel Perez	UD	10	Apr 10, 2010	Hard Rock Hotel and Casino, Paradise, Nevada, U.S.	
14	Win	14–0	Floriano Pagliara	UD	8	Feb 13, 2010	Las Vegas Hilton, Winchester, Nevada, U.S.	
13	Win	13–0	Gerardo Robles	UD	8	Jan 16, 2010	Hard Rock Hotel and Casino, Paradise, Nevada, U.S.	
12	Win	12–0	Josenilson Dos Santos	UD	8	Nov 13, 2009	Mandalay Bay House of Blues, Paradise, Nevada, U.S.	
11	Win	11–0	Carlos Vinan	UD	6	Aug 15, 2009	Hard Rock Hotel and Casino, Paradise, Nevada, U.S.	
10	Win	10–0	Juan Montiel	UD	6	May 16, 2009	Buffalo Bill's Star Arena, Primm, Nevada, U.S.	
9	Win	9–0	Juan Santiago	UD	4	May 1, 2009	Hard Rock Hotel and Casino, Paradise, Nevada, U.S.	
8	Win	8–0	Rodrigo Aranda	UD	6	Feb 6, 2009	Maywood Activity Center, Maywood, California, U.S.	
7	Win	7–0	Travis Thompson	UD	4	Oct 31, 2008	Hard Rock Hotel and Casino, Paradise, Nevada, U.S.	
6	Win	6–0	Jorge Ruiz	TKO	5 (6), 1:16	Sep 19, 2008	Buffalo Bill's Star Arena, Primm, Nevada, U.S.	
5	Win	5–0	Scott Furney	UD	6	Aug 2, 2008	Palms Casino Resort, Paradise, Nevada, U.S.	
4	Win	4–0	Angel Rodriguez	UD	4	Jun 26, 2008	The Orleans, Paradise, Nevada, U.S.	
3	Win	3–0	Jose Gomez	TKO	2 (4), 0:50	Mar 13, 2008	Hard Rock Hotel and Casino, Paradise, Nevada, U.S.	
2	Win	2–0	Quinton Webb	TKO	1 (4), 1:59	Feb 7, 2008	Hard Rock Hotel and Casino, Paradise, Nevada, U.S.	
1	Win	1–0	Francisco Palacios	UD	4	Dec 20, 2007	Hard Rock Hotel and Casino, Paradise, Nevada, U.S.	

== See also ==
- Notable boxing families
