= Román Martínez (boxer) =

Puerto Rican boxer

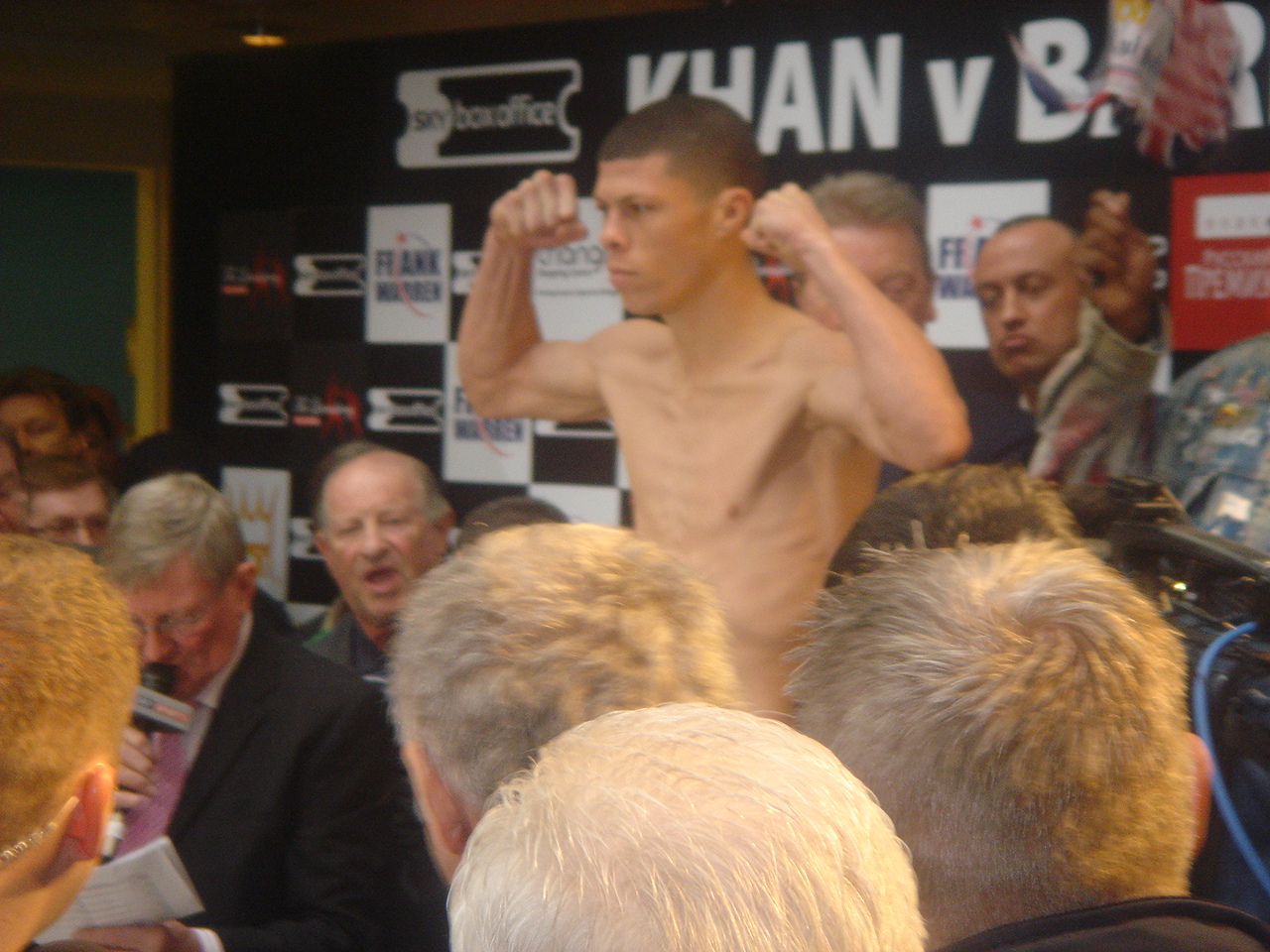
- Martínez in 2008

Personal information
- Nickname: Rocky
- Born: January 31, 1983 (age 43) Vega Baja, Puerto Rico
- Height: 5 ft 8 in (173 cm)
- Weight: Super featherweight

Boxing career
- Reach: 67 in (170 cm)
- Stance: Orthodox

Boxing record
- Total fights: 37
- Wins: 30
- Win by KO: 18
- Losses: 4
- Draws: 3

Román "Rocky" Martínez (born January 31, 1983) is a Puerto Rican professional boxer. He is a former WBO junior lightweight champion, having held the title three times between 2009 and 2016.

== Professional career ==
=== Lightweight ===
==== Early career ====
On December 22, 2001, Martinez began his professional career, beating fellow Puerto Rican Wilfredo Ramos with a fourth round knockout on the undercard of a bill headed by Irving Garcia in Manatí, Puerto Rico. After defeating Ricky Piedra by knockout, he won his first decision against Israel Galarza. During the next year, Martínez defeated Richard Boyd, Adisone Sengaroun and Joe Johnson by knockout and Israel Coraliz by unanimous decision, before scoring the first draw of his career against Jose Leonardo Cruz. After six months of inactivity, he returned to action on April 23, 2004, defeating Celestino Rodriguez by technical knockout. Martínez fought once more in 2004, defeating Johnny Walker by unanimous decision. On January 27, 2005, he fought Mario Lacey, defeating him by knockout after scoring three knockdowns in the fourth round. After defeating Derrick Moon by unanimous decision, Martínez fought to ten rounds for the first time in his career, defeating Jose Luis Soto Karass by unanimous decision. This fight was followed by eleven months of inactivity, when he returned to action by defeating Wilfredo Vargas by technical knockout in three rounds.

=== Super featherweight ===
On November 17, 2006, Martínez fought in the super featherweight division for the first time, defeating Baudel Cárdenas by technical decision in the tenth round. With this victory, he won the vacant WBO Latino super featherweight title, a regional championship sanctioned by the World Boxing Organization. Three months later he competed for his second professional championship against Francisco Lorenzo. Martínez won the contest by split decision and received the WBO Inter-Continental super featherweight title. After defeating Genaro Trazancos by technical knockout in a non-title fight, he participated in a unification match against Daniel Jimenez. Martínez won by knockout in the twelfth and final round, retaining the Inter-Continental super featherweight title and winning the WBO NABO super featherweight championship.

On February 23, 2008, he defended the first of these titles against Jose Anibal Cruz, winning by technical knockout in the third round. This was followed by a preparatory fight against Cristian Favela in the lightweight division, which he won by unanimous decision, with scores of 97-93, 98-92 and 99-91. On August 30, 2008, Martínez defended the NABO super featherweight title against Santos Benavides, winning the contest by technical knockout in the sixth round. He entered this fight ranked third in the WBO and expected to receive a championship opportunity against then-champion Alex Arthur if he won.

==== Martinez vs. Cook ====
On September 9, 2008, Nicky Cook defeated Arthur and inherited Martínez as his first contender. A fight between both pugilists was scheduled for March 14, 2009, as part of a card organized in Manchester, England. Early in the fight, Cook began his offensive by throwing jabs. Martínez responded by approaching his opponent to fight inside. Both connected solid body punches in the first two rounds. Cook closed the second stanza by injuring Martínez with a left hook, which he followed with a combination before the bell. During the third, they continued exchanging body punches, displaying tentative behavior throughout the period. In the fourth round, Martínez scored a knockdown, which was quickly followed by a hook that left Cook partially unconscious. The referee intervened immediately, awarding Martínez a technical knockout victory and his first world championship.

==== Martinez vs. Viloria, Munguia ====
In his first defense, Martínez competed against Feider Viloria. The first stages of the fight were slow, being used as study rounds by both pugilists. In the second round, Martínez began pursuing the offensive, forcing Viloria to employ a defensive strategy. This continued during the following chapter, when a previous injury re-opened under the challenger’s right eye. In the fifth round, both boxers traded combinations, with Martínez scoring the best punches. Viloria countered by employing multiple combinations during the following chapter, winning the round. Consequently, Martínez was more aggressive during the latter part of the fight. In the ninth round, he scored a combination that left Viloria unconscious, winning the contest by knockout.

On May 29, 2010, Martínez made his second defense after eight months of inactivity. His opponent was Gonzalo Munguía of Nicaragua. The contest opened with Gonzalo Munguía, who was physically stronger pursuing direct exchanges, while Martínez employed an uncommon strategy of technical sidestepping and counterattacks. During the second, Munguía employed his offensive to the body, but received a left hook that staggered him to close the round. The following round opened with both boxers exchanging, Martínez was able to gain control after thirty seconds. Munguía lowered his offensive output in the fourth round leaving openings in his defense. Martínez was able to exploit this, scoring a knockdown. Munguía was unable to stand up before the referee’s protective count concluded and the contest was stopped by knockout.

==== Martinez vs. Burns ====
On September 4, 2010, Martinez travelled to the United Kingdom to defend his WBO title against Scottish contender Ricky Burns (28-2, 7 KO). Martinez suffered his first professional defeat and dethroned of his world title in Glasgow as Burns emerged victorious after a 12-round decision. Martinez knocked Burns down in the opening round, but Burns rebounded from this as the judges scored it 115-112 (twice) and 115-113.

Following his defeat, Martinez took 11 months out of the ring and returned in October 2011. He defeated 32 year old fringe contender Daniel Attah in Puerto Rico. The fight ended in round 6. Attah was knocked down in round 3 and twice in round 6. At the time of stoppage, the fight was still close as the judges had it 49-45, 48-46, 47-47, although had round 6 finished, it would have widened the gap being a 10-7 round for Martinez.

==== Martinez vs. Beltran ====
On September 15, 2012, at the Thomas & Mack Center, Paradise, Nevada, U.S.A., Martinez defeated Mexican contender Miguel Beltran, Jr. to win the vacant WBO super featherweight title for a second time. Ricky Burns had vacated the title to move up to the lightweight division. The fight end as a split decision 2-1: judges Clark Sammartino and Duane Ford voted 114-113 for Martinez, and judge Lisa Giampa 116-111 for Beltrán, Jr. Martinez and Beltran both employed heavy offensive weapons. Beltran found a lot of success with his right hand, and Martinez seemed to put punches together better in combination. Neither did major body work, but Beltran had the advantage there with a strong left hook.

==== Martinez vs. Burgos, Magdaleno ====
In his first defence of his second title reign, Martinez fought former featherweight world title challenger Juan Carlos Burgos at Madison Square Garden on January 19, 2013. At the time of the fight, Martinez entered as the #3 super featherweight contender in the world according to The Ring Magazine. Burgos was ranked the #7 contender. The fight ended in a majority draw. Judge Tony Paolillo had it 116-112 for Martinez, judge Waleska Roldan had it 111-117 in favour of Burgos while the third judge John Signorile scored it a 114-114 even.

Although many routed for a rematch between Martinez and Burgos, some having Burgos a clear winner, Martinez travelled to Macau to fight at the Cotai Arena against undefeated challenger Diego Magdaleno (23-0, 9 KOs) on April 6. Martinez knocked down Magdaleno once in round 4 which helped earn him a split decision after 12 rounds with scores of (114-113, 115-112, and 111-116).

==== Martinez vs. Garcia ====
On August 1, 2013, the WBO ordered Martínez to make a mandatory defence against Mikey Garcia. On September 9, the date of the purse bid, a deal was set for the fight to take place on November 9 at the American Bank Center in Corpus Christi, Texas. Martinez knocked Garcia down in the second round with a counter right hand. Martinez could not press his early advantage and Garcia recovered and dominated the rest of the fight. A heavy Garcia left hook to the body in the eighth round left Martinez floored and unable to get up before the referee counted to ten. Garcia landed nearly half of his total 127 power punches. This included 52 punches landed in the last three rounds compared to 8 landed by Martínez.

Just like his first professional loss, Martinez took 11 months off after losing his world title to Garcia. Martinez returned to the ring in December 2014 in his home country of Puerto Rico. He fought 26 year old journeyman Herbert Quartey. The fight was ended in round 2 as Quartey was knocked down and out.

==== Martinez vs. Salido I & II ====
Martinez challenged WBO super featherweight champion Orlando Salido on April 11, 2015, at the Jose Miguel Agrelot Coliseum in San Juan, Puerto Rico. Salido came into this fight with a perfect record of (5-0, 4 KO's) against Puerto Rican fighters. Martinez defeated Salido by a 12-round unanimous decision when the judges scored the fight 114-111, 115-110 and 116-109. Martinez dropped Salido in rounds 3 and 5 and Salido lost one point for low blows in round 11, which didn't help the outcome. Martinez claimed the title for the third time.

A rematch was confirmed for September 12 at the MGM Grand Arena in Las Vegas on the undercard of Mayweather vs. Berto. Martinez retained his world title by split decision draw in the rematch with Salido. In what many believed was a win for Salido as he threw over 1000 punches landing 285 compared to Martinez who landed 189 from 691 thrown. The three official judges scored the bout (113-115, 115-113 & 114-114).

==== Martinez vs. Lomachenko ====
It was announced that Martinez would defend his WBO title against accomplished Ukrainian boxer Vasiliy Lomachenko on June 11, 2016, at The Theater at Madison Square Garden. Lomachenko was the current WBO featherweight champion and was moving up in weight looking to become a two-weight world champion. Lomachenko outboxed and outclassed Martinez for four rounds, landing left hands and right hooks, using his footwork to keep the range he wanted at all times. Lomachenko knocked out Martinez with a big right hook in the fifth round becoming a two-division world champion in his seventh pro fight.

==== Inactivity ====
According to TMZ Sports in early July 2017, it was reported that Gervonta Davis would feature in the co-main event of Floyd Mayweather Jr. vs. Conor McGregor on August 26, 2017, at the T-Mobile Arena in Paradise, Nevada. On July 29, The Ring Magazine reported that Davis would likely defend his IBF title against former WBO champion Martínez. On August 10, Ringtv reported that Davis would instead fight unbeaten prospect Francisco Fonseca (19-0-1, 13 KOs), who at the time was ranked number 7 by the IBF. According to some sources, the potential fight with Martínez was dropped due to notice and Martínez would not have had enough time to make the 130 pound limit.

== Professional boxing record ==
37 fights	30 wins	4 losses
By knockout	18	3
By decision	12	1
Draws	3	

No.	Result	Record	Opponent	Type	Round, time	Date	Location	Notes
37	Loss	30–4–3	Yuriorkis Gamboa	KO	2 (10), 2:00	Jul 27, 2019	Royal Farms Arena, Baltimore, Maryland, U.S.	
36	Win	30–3–3	William Gonzalez	TKO	8 (10), 1:03	Mar 29, 2019	Cancha Ruben Zayas Montanez, Trujillo Alto, Puerto Rico	
35	Loss	29–3–3	Vasiliy Lomachenko	KO	5 (12), 1:09	Jun 11, 2016	The Theater at Madison Square Garden, New York City, New York, U.S.	Lost WBO super featherweight title
34	Draw	29–2–3	Orlando Salido	SD	12	Sep 12, 2015	MGM Grand Garden Arena, Paradise, Nevada, U.S.	Retained WBO super featherweight title
33	Win	29–2–2	Orlando Salido	UD	12	Apr 11, 2015	José Miguel Agrelot Coliseum, San Juan, Puerto Rico	Won WBO super featherweight title
32	Win	28–2–2	Herbert Quartey	KO	2 (10), 2:33	Dec 20, 2014	El San Juan Resort & Casino, Carolina, Puerto Rico	
31	Loss	27–2–2	Mikey Garcia	KO	8 (12), 0:56	Nov 9, 2013	American Bank Center, Corpus Christi, Texas, U.S.	Lost WBO super featherweight title
30	Win	27–1–2	Diego Magdaleno	SD	12	Apr 6, 2013	Cotai Arena, Macau, SAR	Retained WBO super featherweight title
29	Draw	26–1–2	Juan Carlos Burgos	SD	12	Jan 19, 2013	The Theater at Madison Square Garden, New York City, New York, U.S.	Retained WBO super featherweight title
28	Win	26–1–1	Miguel Beltrán Jr.	SD	12	Sep 15, 2012	Thomas & Mack Center, Paradise, Nevada, U.S.	Won vacant WBO super featherweight title
27	Win	25–1–1	Daniel Attah	TKO	6 (12), 1:50	Oct 1, 2011	Coliseo Rubén Rodríguez, Bayamón, Puerto Rico	Won vacant WBO Inter-Continental super featherweight title
26	Loss	24–1–1	Ricky Burns	UD	12	Sep 4, 2010	Kelvin Hall, Glasgow, Scotland	Lost WBO super featherweight title
25	Win	24–0–1	Gonzalo Munguía	KO	4 (12), 1:48	May 29, 2010	Coliseo Rubén Rodríguez, Bayamón, Puerto Rico	Retained WBO super featherweight title
24	Win	23–0–1	Feider Viloria	KO	9 (12), 2:59	Sep 12, 2009	José Miguel Agrelot Coliseum, San Juan, Puerto Rico	Retained WBO super featherweight title
23	Win	22–0–1	Nicky Cook	TKO	4 (12), 2:20	Mar 14, 2009	MEN Arena, Manchester, England	Won WBO super featherweight title
22	Win	21–0–1	Walter Estrada	UD	10	Dec 13, 2008	José Miguel Agrelot Coliseum, San Juan, Puerto Rico	
21	Win	20–0–1	Santos Benavides	TKO	6 (12), 2:03	Aug 30, 2008	Coliseo Rubén Rodríguez, Bayamón, Puerto Rico	Retained WBO–NABO super featherweight title
20	Win	19–0–1	Cristian Favela	UD	10	Apr 25, 2008	Coliseo Antonio R. Barceló, Toa Baja, Puerto Rico	
19	Win	18–0–1	José Aníbal Cruz	TKO	3 (12)	Feb 23, 2008	Coliseo Héctor Solá Bezares, Caguas, Puerto Rico	Retained WBO Inter-Continental super featherweight title
18	Win	17–0–1	Daniel Jiménez	KO	12 (12), 1:51	Aug 25, 2007	Coliseo Rubén Rodríguez, Bayamón, Puerto Rico	Won WBO–NABO and vacant WBO Inter-Continental super featherweight titles
17	Win	16–0–1	Genaro Trazancos	TKO	3 (10), 2:43	Jun 22, 2007	José Miguel Agrelot Coliseum, San Juan, Puerto Rico	
16	Win	15–0–1	Francisco Lorenzo	SD	12	Feb 2, 2007	Coliseo Pedrín Zorrilla, San Juan, Puerto Rico	Won vacant WBO Inter-Continental super featherweight title
15	Win	14–0–1	Baudel Cárdenas	TD	10 (12), 0:41	Nov 17, 2006	Mario Morales Coliseum, Guaynabo, Puerto Rico	Won vacant WBO Latino super featherweight title
14	Win	13–0–1	Wilfredo Vargas	TKO	3 (6), 1:56	Sep 30, 2006	Coliseo Héctor Solá Bezares, Caguas, Puerto Rico	
13	Win	12–0–1	José Luis Soto Karass	UD	10	Oct 21, 2005	José Miguel Agrelot Coliseum, San Juan, Puerto Rico	
12	Win	11–0–1	Derrick Moon	UD	8	Mar 5, 2005	Mandalay Bay Events Center, Paradise, Nevada, U.S.	
11	Win	10–0–1	Mario Lacey	KO	5 (6), 1:35	Jan 27, 2005	Michael's Eighth Avenue, Glen Burnie, Maryland, U.S.	
10	Win	9–0–1	Johnny Walker	UD	8	Jul 15, 2004	Chumash Casino Resort, Santa Ynez, California, U.S.	
9	Win	8–0–1	Celestino Rodríguez	TKO	7 (8)	Apr 23, 2004	Coliseo Guillermo Angulo, Carolina, Puerto Rico	
8	Draw	7–0–1	José Cruz	SD	6	Oct 24, 2003	Miccosukee Resort & Gaming, Miami, Florida, U.S.	
7	Win	7–0	Joe Johnson	TKO	3	Apr 12, 2003	Miccosukee Resort & Gaming, Miami, Florida, U.S.	
6	Win	6–0	Adisone Sengaroun	KO	3 (4)	Feb 21, 2003	Miccosukee Resort & Gaming, Miami, Florida, U.S.	
5	Win	5–0	Israel Coraliz	UD	4	Oct 27, 2003	Mario Morales Coliseum, Guaynabo, Puerto Rico	
4	Win	4–0	Richard Boyd	KO	1 (4), 1:51	Oct 5, 2002	Cobo Hall, Detroit, Michigan, U.S.	
3	Win	3–0	Israel Galarza	SD	4	Mar 23, 2002	Bayamón, Puerto Rico	
2	Win	2–0	Ricky Piedra	KO	1 (4)	Feb 22, 2002	Miccosukee Resort & Gaming, Miami, Florida, U.S.	
1	Win	1–0	Wilfredo Ramos	TKO	4	Dec 22, 2001	Acropolis, Manatí, Puerto Rico	

Sporting positions
Regional boxing titles
Vacant Title last held by Matias Daniel Ferreyra	WBO Latino junior lightweight champion November 17, 2006 – February 2, 2007; Won Inter-Continental title	Vacant Title next held by Vicente Martín Rodríguez
Vacant Title last held by Kevin Mitchell	WBO Inter-Continental junior lightweight champion February 2, 2007 – July 2007; Vacated	Vacant Title next held by Kevin Mitchell
Vacant Title last held by Kevin Mitchell	WBO Inter-Continental junior lightweight champion August 25, 2007 – June 2008; Vacated	Vacant Title next held by Kevin Mitchell
Preceded by Daniel Jiménez	WBO–NABO junior lightweight champion August 25, 2007 – March 2009; Vacated	Vacant Title next held by Eloy Pérez
Vacant Title last held by Adrien Broner	WBO Inter-Continental junior lightweight champion October 1, 2011 – March 2012; Vacated	Vacant Title next held by Stephen Smith
World boxing titles
Preceded by Nicky Cook	WBO junior lightweight champion March 14, 2009 – September 4, 2010	Succeeded by Ricky Burns
Vacant Title last held by Adrien Broner	WBO junior lightweight champion September 15, 2012 – November 9, 2013	Succeeded by Mikey Garcia
Preceded by Orlando Salido	WBO junior lightweight champion April 11, 2015 – June 11, 2016	Succeeded by Vasiliy Lomachenko
