= Miguel Beltrán Jr. =

Mexican boxer (born 1989)

Personal information
- Nickname: Barreterito Yael
- Born: Miguel Guadalupe Beltrán Ruiz Jr. 21 July 1989 (age 37) Los Mochis, Sinaloa, Mexico
- Height: 5 ft 7 in (170 cm)
- Weight: Featherweight; Super Featherweight; Lightweight

Boxing career
- Reach: 65 in (165 cm)
- Stance: Orthodox

Boxing record
- Total fights: 44
- Wins: 35
- Win by KO: 24
- Losses: 8
- No contests: 1

Miguel Guadalupe Beltrán Ruiz Jr. (born 21 July 1989) is a Mexican professional boxer. He has challenged twice for junior lightweight world championships; the IBF title in 2011 and the WBO title in 2012.

== Professional career ==
Beltrán made his professional debut on 7 February 2007, scoring a first-round technical knockout (TKO) over Patricio López at Bar El Sinaloense in Los Mochis, Sinaloa, Mexico.

== Professional boxing record ==
| 44 fights | 35 wins | 8 losses |
|---|---|---|
| By knockout | 24 | 3 |
| By decision | 11 | 5 |
| No contests | 1 | |

| No. | Result | Record | Opponent | Type | Round, time | Date | Location | Notes |
|---|---|---|---|---|---|---|---|---|
| 44 | Win | 35–8 (1) | Abraham López | TKO | 5 (8), 0:10 | 2 Sep 2022 | Culiacán, Sinaloa, Mexico | |
| 43 | Win | 34–8 (1) | Geovanny Agustín López | TKO | 2 (8), 1:40 | 3 Dec 2020 | Box Time Gym, Culiacán, Mexico | |
| 42 | Loss | 33–8 (1) | Chris Colbert | KO | 1 (10), 2:57 | 21 Sep 2019 | Rabobank Theater, Bakersfield, California, U.S. | For vacant WBA-NABA USA lightweight title |
| 41 | Loss | 33–7 (1) | Yuriorkis Gamboa | UD | 10 | 10 Nov 2018 | Marlins Park, Miami, Florida, U.S. | |
| 40 | Win | 33–6 (1) | Luis Muñoz Durán | TKO | 1 (8), 2:58 | 14 Sep 2018 | Polideportivo Juan S. Millan, Culiacán, Mexico | |
| 39 | Loss | 32–6 (1) | Casey Ramos | UD | 10 | 28 Apr 2017 | Mariott Convention Center, Burbank, California, U.S. | |
| 38 | Win | 32–5 (1) | Maximiliano Galindo | UD | 10 | 9 Dec 2016 | Polideportivo Juan S. Millan, Culiacán, Mexico | |
| 37 | Loss | 31–5 (1) | Francisco Gabriel Piña | UD | 8 | 3 Sep 2016 | Deportivo Morelos Pavon, Mexico City, Mexico | |
| 36 | Win | 31–4 (1) | Juan Valdez | TKO | 2 (8), 1:58 | 6 May 2016 | Score Sport Bar, Guasave, Mexico | |
| 35 | Win | 30–4 (1) | Paul Salcido | RTD | 2 (10) | 18 Dec 2015 | Estadio Teodoro Mariscal, Mazatlán, Mexico | |
| 34 | Loss | 29–4 (1) | Luis Sánchez | UD | 8 | 20 Dec 2014 | Arena Quequi, Cancún, Mexico | |
| 33 | Win | 29–3 (1) | Francisco Javier Ríos Martínez | TKO | 1 (?), 2:17 | 30 Aug 2014 | Centro de Usos Multiples, Hermosillo, Mexico | |
| 32 | Loss | 28–3 (1) | Carlos Díaz | KO | 6 (10), 0:59 | 8 Feb 2014 | Hipódromo Caliente, Arena Tecate, Tijuana, Mexico | |
| 31 | Win | 28–2 (1) | Jaime Maldonado | KO | 2 (8), 2:59 | 2 Nov 2013 | Centro de Usos Multiples, Hermosillo, Mexico | |
| 30 | Loss | 27–2 (1) | Román Martínez | SD | 12 | 15 Sep 2012 | Thomas & Mack Center, Paradise, Nevada, U.S. | For vacant WBO junior lightweight title |
| 29 | Win | 27–1 (1) | Carlos Parra | UD | 6 | 19 May 2012 | Arena TKT Box Tour, Puerto Vallarta, Mexico | |
| 28 | NC | 26–1 (1) | Juan Carlos Salgado | NC | 2 (12), 2:34 | 10 Dec 2011 | Estadio Centenario, Los Mochis, Mexico | For IBF junior lightweight title; The doctor stopped the fight due to an injury in Salgado's left eyebrow caused by an accidental headbutt |
| 27 | Win | 26–1 | Sergio Pérez | UD | 8 | 24 Sep 2011 | Auditorio del Estado, Mexicali, Mexico | |
| 26 | Win | 25–1 | Fernando García | UD | 8 | 25 Jun 2011 | Estadio Banorte, Culiacán, Mexico | |
| 25 | Win | 24–1 | Roberto Tamayo | KO | 4 (8), 1:50 | 5 Mar 2011 | Palenque de la Feria, Tepic, Mexico | |
| 24 | Win | 23–1 | Arturo Gutiérrez | TKO | 3 (4) | 10 Dec 2010 | Gimnasio Municipal, Saltillo, Mexico | |
| 23 | Loss | 22–1 | Joksan Hernández | KO | 10 (10), 2:08 | 24 Apr 2010 | Centro de Usos Multiples, Ciudad Obregón, Mexico | |
| 22 | Win | 22–0 | Miguel Román | SD | 10 | 18 Dec 2009 | Auditorio Municipal, Tijuana, Mexico | |
| 21 | Win | 21–0 | Abraham Rodríguez | UD | 8 | 31 Oct 2009 | Complejo Deportivo La Inalámbrica, Mérida, Mexico | |
| 20 | Win | 20–0 | Eduardo Lazcano | UD | 6 | 8 Sep 2009 | Restaurante Arroyo, Mexico City, Mexico | |
| 19 | Win | 19–0 | Edén Márquez | TKO | 4 (8) | 6 Jun 2009 | Explanda Tecate, Ciudad Obregón, Mexico | |
| 18 | Win | 18–0 | Martín Armenta Chaparro | TKO | 3 (6), 2:25 | 11 Apr 2009 | Estadio de Béisbol Arturo C. Nahl, La Paz, Mexico | |
| 17 | Win | 17–0 | Victoriano Núñez | KO | 4 (10), 1:31 | 28 Feb 2009 | Polideportico Centenario, Los Mochis, Mexico | |
| 16 | Win | 16–0 | Ramón Camargo Beltrán | KO | 1 (6) | 14 Feb 2009 | Expo Forum, Hermosillo, Mexico | |
| 15 | Win | 15–0 | José Barrero | UD | 6 | 27 Sep 2008 | Centro de Convenciones Siglo XXI, Mérida, Mexico | |
| 14 | Win | 14–0 | José Luis López | KO | 3 (6) | 29 Aug 2008 | Gimnasio German Evers, Mazatlán, Mexico | |
| 13 | Win | 13–0 | Héctor Cervantes Soriano | TKO | 3 (6), 0:37 | 12 Jul 2008 | Palenque de la Expo Gan, Hermosillo, Mexico | |
| 12 | Win | 12–0 | Arturo Hernández | KO | 4 (6), 0:48 | 20 Jun 2008 | Gimnasio Dr. Solórzano, Mazatlán, Mexico | |
| 11 | Win | 11–0 | Wendell Codere | TKO | 4 (6), 2:42 | 31 May 2008 | Plaza de Toros Fermín Rivera, San Luis Potosí, Mexico | |
| 10 | Win | 10–0 | Jonathan Arias | KO | 2 (?) | 18 Apr 2008 | Gimnasio German Evers, Mazatlán, Mexico | |
| 9 | Win | 9–0 | Roberto Cuenca | KO | 4 (6) | 14 Mar 2008 | Gimnasio German Evers, Mazatlán, Mexico | |
| 8 | Win | 8–0 | Arturo Ruiz Torres | KO | 1 (4), 2:21 | 25 Jan 2008 | Auditorio Benito Juáres, Los Mochis, Mexico | |
| 7 | Win | 7–0 | Víctor Valencia | UD | 4 | 21 Dec 2007 | Gimnasio German Evers, Mazatlán, Mexico | |
| 6 | Win | 6–0 | Antonio Valencia | UD | 6 | 10 Aug 2007 | Polideportivo Centenario, Los Mochis, Mexico | |
| 5 | Win | 5–0 | Agapito Ontiveros | TKO | 2 (4), 0:45 | 14 Jul 2007 | Explanada Tecate, Ciudad Obregón, Mexico | |
| 4 | Win | 4–0 | Francisco Montiel | UD | 6 | 29 Jun 2007 | Auditorio Benito Juárez, Los Mochis, Mexico | |
| 3 | Win | 3–0 | Geovanny Pacheco | TKO | 1 (4), 2:13 | 25 May 2007 | Salon Rodeo, Los Mochis, Mexico | |
| 2 | Win | 2–0 | Rafael Solano | KO | 1 (4), 2:26 | 21 Apr 2007 | Gimnasio Municipal, Guaymas, Mexico | |
| 1 | Win | 1–0 | Patricio López | TKO | 1 (4), 1:06 | 2 Feb 2007 | Bar El Sinaloense, Los Mochis, Mexico | |
