= Alberto Puello =

Dominican Republic boxer (born 1994)

Personal information
- Nickname: La Avispa ("The Wasp")
- Born: Alberto Puello Calderón; 22 July 1994 (age 32) San Juan de la Maguana, Dominican Republic
- Height: 5 ft 9 in (175 cm)
- Weight: Super-lightweight

Boxing career
- Reach: 71 in (180 cm)
- Stance: Southpaw

Boxing record
- Total fights: 27
- Wins: 25
- Win by KO: 11
- Losses: 2

Alberto Puello Calderón (born 22 July 1994) is a Dominican professional boxer. He is a two-time super-lightweight champion, having held the WBA title from 2022 to 2023 and the WBC title from 2024 to 2025.

== Professional career ==
=== Early career ===
Puello made his professional debut against Marcos Hernandez on 7 March 2015. He won the fight by a first-round technical knockout. Puello amassed a 10–0 record during the next 18 months, before being scheduled to fight for his first title.

Puello faced Abrahan Peralta for the vacant WBA Fedelatin and WBC Latino super-lightweight titles on 24 February 2017. He captured his first professional title by an eight-round stoppage, as Peralta retired from the fight at the end of the eight round. After beating Patrick López by a seventh-round technical knockout on 24 June 2017, Puello was booked to make his first WBA Fedelatin and Latino title defenses against Ricardo Gutierrez on 18 November 2017. He made quick work of his opponent, winning the fight by a first-round knockout. Puello beat Francisco Contreras Lopez by unanimous decision on 22 December 2017, in another stay-busy non-title fight, before being scheduled to face Erick Lopez in his second WBA Fedelatin title defense. He won the fight by unanimous decision.

Puello was booked to face the undefeated Jonathan Alonso for the WBA interim super-lightweight title. The bout was scheduled as the main event of a card which took place at the Coliseo Carlos 'Teo' Cruz in Santo Domingo, Dominican Republic on 27 July 2019. Puello won the fight by unanimous decision, with all three judges scoring the fight 115–113 in his favor. Puello made his first WBA interim title defense against Cristian Rafael Coria on 17 December 2020, following a seventeen-month absence from the sport. He justified his role as the favorite, winning the fight by a seventh-round stoppage, as Coria retired from the bout at the end of the round. Puello made his second and final title defense against Jesus Antonio Rubio on 21 July 2021. The fight was booked as the co-headliner to the WBA interim minimumweight title bout between Erick Rosa and Ricardo Astuvilca. Puello won the fight by unanimous decision, with all three judges awarding him a 120–107 scorecard. On 25 August 2021, Puello was stripped of his interim title, as the WBA eliminated their interim champion designations.

Puello was booked to face Ve Shawn Owens on 18 December 2021, in a 143 pounds catchweight bout, on the undercard of the WBA super middleweight title bout between David Morrell and Alantez Fox. The fight represented Puello's United States debut, as it took place at the Armory in Minneapolis, Minnesota. Puello won the bout by unanimous decision, with scores of 98–92, 100–90 and 99–91.

=== WBA super lightweight champion ===
==== Puello vs. Akhmedov ====
On 9 March 2022 the undisputed light welterweight champion Josh Taylor was ordered by the WBA to make a mandatory title defense against Puello. As the pair failed to come to terms, a purse bid was called by the WBA for 22 April. The bid was won by TGB Promotions, with an offer of $200,000, with a 55/45 split in favor of Taylor. Taylor failed to proceed with the mandatory title defense, and was stripped of his light-welterweight belt as a result. On 11 June 2022 the WBA ordered Puello to face the one-time WBA (Regular) super-lightweight title challenger Batyr Akhmedov for the vacant light-welterweight championship. The fight was scheduled for 20 August 2022, and was set to take place on the undercard of the Adrien Broner and Omar Figueroa Jr. welterweight bout. Puello won the fight by split decision. Two judges scored the fight 117–111 for Puello, while the third judge scored the fight 115–113. Puello became the first super lightweight champion from the Dominican Republic.

==== PED suspension ====
It was revealed on 8 February 2023 that Puello would make his maiden title defense against the one-time WBA lightweight title challenger Rolando Romero. The championship bout was expected to take place on 13 May 2023, in the main event of a Showtime broadcast card. Puello tested positive for a performance-enhancing substance on 19 April. He was named champion-in-recess on 10 May 2023, and was handed a six-month suspension on 22 June.

=== WBC super lightweight champion ===
==== Puello vs. Russell ====
Puello was scheduled to face Gary Antuanne Russell for the interim WBC super lightweight title at MGM Grand Garden Arena in Las Vegas on 15 June 2024. Puello defeated Russell by split decision. On 24 June 2024 it was announced that Devin Haney was declared "WBC World Champion in Recess", and Puello was elevated to a full champion.

==== Puello vs. Martín ====
Puello made the first defense of his title against Sandor Martín at Barclays Center in Brooklyn, New York on March 1, 2025. He won by split decision.

==== Puello vs. Matías ====
Puello made his second title defense against Subriel Matías at Louis Armstrong Stadium in New York on July 12, 2025. He lost by majority decision with two of the ringside judges scoring the fight 115–113 in favour of his opponent, while the third had it a 114–114 draw.

=== Post-championship ===
==== Puello vs. Smith ====
Puello was scheduled to challenge Dalton Smith for his WBC super lightweight title in Sheffield, England, on June 6, 2026.On 27 April 2026, Smith pulled out of the fight due to an elbow injury. Dan Rafael reported that Smith's fight with Puello had been rescheduled to 24 October 2026 at the same venue. Puello lost by split decision, with one judge scoring the fight 116–112 in his favour, and the other two scoring it 115–113 for Smith.

== Professional boxing record ==
27 fights	25 wins	2 losses
By knockout	11	0
By decision	14	2

No.	Result	Record	Opponent	Type	Round, time	Date	Location	Notes
27	Loss	25–2	Dalton Smith	SD	12	24 Oct 2026	Sheffield Arena, Sheffield, England	For WBC super lightweight title
26	Win	25–1	Miguel Angel Bolano	TKO	4 (10), 0:22	18 Jul 2026	Coliseo Carlos 'Teo' Cruz, Santo Domingo, Dominican Republic	
25	Loss	24–1	Subriel Matías	MD	12	12 Jul 2025	Louis Armstrong Stadium, New York City, New York, U.S.	Lost WBC super lightweight title
24	Win	24–0	Sandor Martín	SD	12	1 Mar 2025	Barclays Center, New York City, New York, U.S.	Retained WBC super lightweight title
23	Win	23–0	Gary Antuanne Russell	SD	12	15 Jun 2024	MGM Grand Garden Arena, Paradise, Nevada, U.S.	Won vacant WBC interim super lightweight title
22	Win	22–0	Ector Madera	UD	8	16 Dec 2023	Armory, Minneapolis, Minnesota, U.S.	
21	Win	21–0	Batyr Akhmedov	SD	12	20 Aug 2022	Hard Rock Live, Hollywood, Florida, U.S.	Won vacant WBA super lightweight title
20	Win	20–0	Ve Shawn Owens	UD	10	18 Dec 2021	Armory, Minneapolis, Minnesota, U.S.	
19	Win	19–0	Jesus Antonio Rubio	UD	12	21 Jul 2021	Pabellon de Boleibol, Santo Domingo, Dominican Republic	Retained WBA interim super lightweight title
18	Win	18–0	Cristian Rafael Coria	RTD	6 (12), 3:00	17 Dec 2020	Hotel Catalonia Malecon Center, Santo Domingo, Dominican Republic	Retained WBA interim super lightweight title
17	Win	17–0	Jonathan Alonso	UD	12	27 Jul 2019	Coliseo Carlos 'Teo' Cruz, Santo Domingo, Dominican Republic	Won WBA interim super lightweight title
16	Win	16–0	David Bency	TKO	3 (10)	10 Nov 2018	Hotel Jaragua, Santo Domingo, Dominican Republic	
15	Win	15–0	Erick Lopez	UD	11	17 Mar 2018	Hotel Jaragua, Santo Domingo, Dominican Republic	Retained WBA Fedelatin super lightweight title
14	Win	14–0	Francisco Contreras Lopez	UD	10	22 Dec 2017	Los Prados Social Club, Santo Domingo, Dominican Republic	
13	Win	13–0	Ricardo Gutierrez	KO	1 (11), 1:28	18 Nov 2017	Hotel Jaragua, Santo Domingo, Dominican Republic	Retained WBA Fedelatin and WBC Latino super lightweight titles
12	Win	12–0	Patrick López	TKO	7 (8), 2:08	24 Jun 2017	Hotel Jaragua, Santo Domingo, Dominican Republic	
11	Win	11–0	Abrahan Peralta	RTD	8 (11), 3:00	24 Feb 2017	Maunoloa Night Club y Casino, Santo Domingo, Dominican Republic	Won vacant WBA Fedelatin and WBC Latino super lightweight titles
10	Win	10–0	Kelvin Toribio	UD	10	16 Dec 2016	Maunoloa Night Club y Casino, Santo Domingo, Dominican Republic	
9	Win	9–0	Edward Diaz	KO	4 (10)	16 Sep 2016	Hotel Jaragua, Santo Domingo, Dominican Republic	
8	Win	8–0	Kelly Figueroa	UD	8	16 Jul 2016	Club el Millon, Santo Domingo, Dominican Republic	
7	Win	7–0	Pedro Verdu	UD	6	6 Feb 2016	Hotel Jaragua, Santo Domingo, Dominican Republic	
6	Win	6–0	Ramon De la Cruz	UD	8	19 Nov 2015	Salón la Fiesta, Hotel Jaragua, Santo Domingo, Dominican Republic	
5	Win	5–0	Luis Ernesto José	TKO	4 (8), 1:39	22 Oct 2015	Casa de los Clubes, Santo Domingo, Dominican Republic	
4	Win	4–0	Jose Vidal Soto	UD	6	29 Aug 2015	Club Rubén Espino, Santiago de los Caballeros, Dominican Republic	
3	Win	3–0	Isidro Acosta	KO	1 (6), 1:03	5 Jun 2015	Casa de los Clubes, Santo Domingo, Dominican Republic	
2	Win	2–0	Juan Carlos Santos Guillen	RTD	4 (6), 3:00	18 Apr 2015	Coliseo Carlos 'Teo' Cruz, Santo Domingo, Dominican Republic	
1	Win	1–0	Marcos Hernandez	TKO	1 (6), 2:53	7 Mar 2015	Casa de los Clubes, Santo Domingo, Dominican Republic	

== See also ==
- List of doping cases in sport
- List of southpaw stance boxers
- List of world light-welterweight boxing champions

Sporting positions
Regional boxing titles
Vacant Title last held by Brian Nahuel Zarza	WBA Fedelatin super lightweight champion 24 February 2017 – 27 July 2019; Won interim title	Vacant Title next held by Jovanie Santiago
Vacant Title last held by Brian Nahuel Zarza	WBC Latino super lightweight champion 24 February 2017 – 2019; Vacated	Vacant Title next held by Cesar Soriano Lozada
World boxing titles
Vacant Title last held by José Benavidez Jr.	WBA super lightweight champion Interim title 27 July 2019 – 29 August 2021; Stripped	Vacant Title next held by Ismael Barroso
Vacant Title last held by Gervonta Davis as Regular champion	WBA super lightweight champion 20 August 2022 – 10 May 2023; Status changed	Vacant Title next held by Rolando Romero
Vacant Title last held by Regis Prograis	WBC super lightweight champion Interim title 15–24 June 2024; Promoted	Vacant Title next held by Isaac Cruz
Preceded by Devin Haney; Status changed	WBC super lightweight champion 24 June 2024 – 12 July 2025	Succeeded by Subriel Matías
Honorary boxing titles
New title	WBA super lightweight champion In recess 10 May – July 2023; Designation removed	Vacant
