= Rolando Romero =

Cuban and American boxer (born 1995)

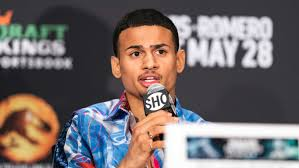

Personal information
- Nickname: Rolly
- Born: Rolando Florencio Romero Moreno; October 14, 1995 (age 31) Las Vegas, Nevada, U.S.
- Height: 5 ft 7 in (170 cm)
- Weight: Lightweight; Light welterweight; Welterweight

Boxing career
- Reach: 68 in (173 cm)
- Stance: Orthodox

Boxing record
- Total fights: 20
- Wins: 17
- Win by KO: 13
- Losses: 3

Rolando Florencio "Rolly" Romero Moreno (/ˈroʊli/, ROH-lee; born October 14, 1995) is an American professional boxer. He is a world champion in two weight classes, having previously held the World Boxing Association (WBA) super lightweight title from 2023 to 2024 and the WBA (Super version) welterweight title from 2025 to 2026.

== Professional career ==
=== Lightweight ===
Romero made his professional debut on December 2, 2016, scoring a first-round technical knockout (TKO) victory against David Courtney at the Sam's Town Hotel and Gambling Hall in Sunrise Manor, Nevada. Romero amassed an 8–0 record during the next three years, winning all but one of those fights by stoppage. Romero was next scheduled to face Andres Figueroa on April 20, 2019, on the undercard of the Danny Garcia and Adrián Granados welterweight bout. He won the fight by a fourth-round knockout. Romero had his first step-up in competition on November 1, 2019, when he faced Juan Carlos Cordones. He won the fight by a first-round knockout, stopping Cordones in the final minute of the opening round. Romero faced the undefeated Arturs Ahmetovs on February 22, 2020, on the undercard of Deontay Wilder and Tyson Fury II. He won the fight by a second-round technical knockout.

==== Romero vs. Maríñez, Sparrow ====
After compiling a record of 11–0 (10 KOs) Romero faced undefeated Dominican Jackson Maríñez for the vacant WBA interim lightweight title on August 15, 2020, at the Mohegan Sun Arena in Uncasville, Connecticut. Romero captured the vacant WBA interim title via twelve-round unanimous decision (UD) with the judges' scorecards reading 118–110, 116–112, and 115–113. This decision was considered very controversial, with the majority feeling Maríñez earned the win.

Romero was scheduled to take on Justin Pauldo, but Pauldo came in 5Ibs over the contracted weight. Romero's team would then change the weight to 140 Ibs, but Pauldo failed a pre-fight physical with the commission having to cancel it. Romero fought Avery Sparrow as a last minute opponent, the latter having had five weeks of training prior to this fight. Romero defeated his opponent by seventh-round technical knockout, and aired his frustrations with Sparrow's fighting style after the fight: "He fought like a coward, he just wanted a street fight because he knew he wasn't gonna do anything to me."

==== Romero vs. Yigit ====
Romero was slated to defend his interim title against Austin Dulay on the undercard of Jermell Charlo vs. Brian Castaño on July 17, 2021. Dulay pulled out of the fight a few days before the scheduled date which prompted Romero to claim that Dulay had pulled out of the fight due to a “panic attack.” Dulay responded by revealing that he suffered a knee injury and offered to give Romero $10,000 of his fight purse to reschedule the fight. Anthony Yigit was subsequently moved from his untelevised preliminary slot to step in as Romero's opponent. Romero's title was no longer on the line when Yigit weighed in 5.2 lbs over the 135 lb limit, but the fight nonetheless went ahead. On the night, Romero dropped Yigit multiple times en route to a seventh-round technical knockout victory. The San Antonio crowd booed Romero as he was announced as the winner, voicing their displeasure with his roughhouse tactics of throwing elbows, shoving and grappling his opponent. He was unfazed when questioned about it in his post-fight interview, saying, "I fought a 140 pounder and I fucking stopped him, simple as that."

==== Romero vs. Davis ====
On October 6, 2021, it was announced that Romero would be facing undefeated WBA (Regular) lightweight champion Gervonta Davis on December 5 at the Staples Center in Los Angeles on Showtime PPV. However, Romero was pulled from the bout due to sexual assault allegations made against him, and was subsequently replaced with Isaac Cruz. On January 11, 2022, Romero revealed on his Instagram page that no charges against him were filed, as the claims of sexual abuse could not be substantiated. On January 24, the WBA once again ordered Davis to make a mandatory lightweight title defense against Romero, and gave the pair until February 24 to come to terms. The pair agreed to face each other on May 28, in the main event of a Showtime PPV, at the Barclays Center in New York. Romero was knocked out in the 6th round.

=== Light welterweight ===
==== Romero vs. Barroso ====
On February 8, 2023, it was reported that Romero would move up to light welterweight to challenge the WBA champion Alberto Puello. The championship bout was expected to take place on May 13, 2023, in the main event of a Showtime broadcast card. Puello was pulled from the fight on April 19, after testing positive for a performance-enhancing substance, and was replaced by Ismael Barroso who faced Romero for the vacant championship. Romero won the fight by a controversial ninth-round technical knockout. Barroso was ahead on the all three of the judges' scorecards at the time of the stoppage and had out-landed Romero in both total and power punches.

==== Romero vs. Davies ====
Although Romero was ordered by the WBA to make a mandatory title defense against the twice-defeated Ohara Davies, the pair failed to come to terms within the allotted 30-day negotiation period, which forced the sanctioning body to call for a purse bid to be held. Romero submitted a request for a medical exemption on July 21, which led to the WBA indefinitely postponing the purse bid. A further proof of injury was demanded of Romero on August 4 and again on August 19.

==== Romero vs. Cruz ====
On March 30, 2024 at T-Mobile Arena in Las Vegas, Romero was scheduled to make the first defense of his WBA light welterweight title against Isaac Cruz. Badly battered by the later rounds and failing to mount an effective defense, Romero lost the fight and the title by TKO after the referee jumped in to stop the fight at the 0:56 mark of Round 8.

=== Welterweight ===
==== Romero vs. Jaimes ====
Romero was scheduled to face Manuel Jaimes in a 10-round super lightweight bout at T-Mobile Arena in Las Vegas on September 14, 2024. He won the fight by unanimous decision.

=== WBA welterweight champion ===
==== Romero vs. Garcia ====
Romero fought Ryan Garcia for the vacant WBA (Regular) welterweight title in Times Square in New York on May 2, 2025. He won by unanimous decision.

On August 1, 2025, Romero was elevated to full champion after Jaron Ennis vacated his Super version of the title.

==== Romero vs. Lopez ====
Romero was scheduled to make the first defense of his WBA welterweight title against Teofimo Lopez on August 22, 2026, at T-Mobile Arena in Las Vegas, NV. He lost the fight by majority decision with two of the ringside judges scoring it 116–112 and 115–113 respectively for his opponent, while the third had it a 114–114 draw.

== Personal life ==
Born in the United States, Romero is of Cuban descent. His father Rolando Romero Sr., was a boxer in Cuba and won the National Title there three times.

== Professional boxing record ==
20 fights	17 wins	3 losses
By knockout	13	2
By decision	4	1

No.	Result	Record	Opponent	Type	Round, time	Date	Location	Notes
20	Loss	17–3	Teofimo Lopez	MD	12	Aug 22, 2026	T-Mobile Arena, Las Vegas, Nevada, U.S.	Lost WBA (Super) welterweight title
19	Win	17–2	Ryan Garcia	UD	12	May 2, 2025	Times Square, New York City, New York, U.S.	Won vacant WBA (Regular) welterweight title
18	Win	16–2	Manuel Jaimes	UD	10	Sep 14, 2024	T-Mobile Arena, Paradise, Nevada, U.S.	
17	Loss	15–2	Isaac Cruz	TKO	8 (12), 0:56	Mar 30, 2024	T-Mobile Arena, Paradise, Nevada, U.S.	Lost WBA super lightweight title
16	Win	15–1	Ismael Barroso	TKO	9 (12), 0:20	May 13, 2023	The Cosmopolitan, Paradise, Nevada, U.S.	Won vacant WBA super lightweight title
15	Loss	14–1	Gervonta Davis	TKO	6 (12), 2:39	May 28, 2022	Barclays Center, New York City, New York, U.S.	For WBA (Regular) lightweight title
14	Win	14–0	Anthony Yigit	TKO	7 (12), 1:54	Jul 17, 2021	AT&T Center, San Antonio, Texas, U.S.	WBA interim lightweight title not at stake after Yigit missed weight
13	Win	13–0	Avery Sparrow	TKO	7 (12), 0:43	Jan 23, 2021	Mohegan Sun Arena, Montville, Connecticut, U.S.	
12	Win	12–0	Jackson Maríñez	UD	12	Aug 15, 2020	Mohegan Sun Arena, Montville, Connecticut, U.S.	Won vacant WBA interim lightweight title
11	Win	11–0	Arturs Ahmetovs	TKO	2 (8), 1:22	Feb 22, 2020	MGM Grand Garden Arena, Paradise, Nevada, U.S.	
10	Win	10–0	Juan Carlos Cordones	KO	1 (6), 2:14	Nov 1, 2019	Sam's Town Hotel and Gambling Hall, Sunrise Manor, Nevada, U.S.	
9	Win	9–0	Andres Figueroa	KO	4 (6), 1:27	Apr 20, 2019	Dignity Health Sports Park, Carson, California, U.S.	
8	Win	8–0	Nicolas Atilio Velazquez	KO	1 (6), 1:02	Mar 9, 2019	Dignity Health Sports Park, Carson, California, U.S.	
7	Win	7–0	Rondale Hubbert	TKO	2 (6), 0:45	Dec 7, 2018	Sam's Town Hotel and Gambling Hall, Sunrise Manor, Nevada, U.S.	
6	Win	6–0	Dieumerci Nzau	KO	1 (6), 1:17	Oct 27, 2018	Sam's Town Hotel and Gambling Hall, Sunrise Manor, Nevada, U.S.	
5	Win	5–0	Javier Martinez	UD	6	Aug 3, 2018	Sam's Town Hotel and Gambling Hall, Sunrise Manor, Nevada, U.S.	
4	Win	4–0	Alex Silva	TKO	1 (4), 2:48	Jan 27, 2018	Sam's Town Hotel and Gambling Hall, Sunrise Manor, Nevada, U.S.	
3	Win	3–0	Johnny Estrada	KO	2 (4), 2:02	Oct 21, 2017	Sam's Town Hotel and Gambling Hall, Sunrise Manor, Nevada, U.S.	
2	Win	2–0	Adrian Levya	TKO	4 (4), 0:23	May 20, 2017	Laredo Energy Arena, Laredo, Texas, U.S.	
1	Win	1–0	David Courtney	TKO	1 (4), 1:11	Dec 2, 2016	Sam's Town Hotel and Gambling Hall, Sunrise Manor, Nevada, U.S.	

== Titles in boxing ==
=== Major world titles ===
- WBA super lightweight champion (140 lbs)
- WBA (Super) welterweight champion (147 lbs)

=== Interim world titles ===
- WBA interim lightweight champion (135 lbs)

== See also ==
- List of world light-welterweight boxing champions

Sporting positions
World boxing titles
Vacant Title last held by Ismael Barroso	WBA lightweight champion Interim title August 15, 2020 – August 25, 2021; Stripped	Vacant
Vacant Title last held by Alberto Puello	WBA super lightweight champion May 13, 2023 – March 30, 2024	Succeeded by Isaac Cruz
Vacant Title last held by Eimantas Stanionis	WBA welterweight champion Super title May 2, 2025 – August 22, 2026; Regular title until August 1, 2025	Succeeded by Teofimo Lopez
