= List of doping cases in sport (P) =

This is a sub-list from List of doping cases in sport representing a full list of surnames starting with P.

Name	Country	Event	Banned substance(s)	Reference(s)
Darya Pachabut	Belarus	Weightlifting	Stanozolol	
Jessica Pacho	Ecuador	Weightlifting		
Naskar Uma Pada	India	Swimming	Mephentermine	
Neco Padaratz	Brazil	Surfing	Anabolic steroids	
Emilio Pagani	Italy	Swimming	Cannabis	
Jong Suk Pak	North Korea	Weightlifting	Methyltestosterone	
David Palacios	Ecuador	Weightlifting		
Rafael Palmeiro	United States	Baseball	Stanozolol	
Jyotsna Pansare	India	Swimming	Methylhexaneamine	
Marco Pantani	Italy	Cycling	Declared unfit to ride after a UCI "health check" in the Giro d'Italia, but never formally tested positive or banned.	
Konstantinos Papadopoulos	Greece	Weightlifting	Methyltrienolone, Buprenorphine	
Dimitros Papageridis	Greece	Weightlifting	Methyltrienolone, Buprenorphine	
Esma Gizem Papila	Turkey	Swimming	Clenbuterol	
Joseph M. Papp	United States	Cycling	Testosterone or its precursors (6α-OH-androstenedione 6β-OH-androsterone)	
Hugo Parisi	Brazil	Swimming	Prednisone, Prednisolone	
Karo Parisyan	United States	mixed martial arts	Hydrocodone, Hydromorphone, and Oxymorphone	
Bradley Parker	United Kingdom	Rugby union		
Christian Parker	United States	Baseball		
Dave Parker	United States	Baseball	Cocaine	
Yusuf Pathan	India	Cricket	Terbutaline	
Stephen Pate	Australia	Cycling	Steroids	
Troy Patton	United States	Baseball	Amphetamine	
Lenny Paul	United Kingdom	Bobsleigh	Nandrolone	
David Paulino	Dominican Republic	Baseball	Boldenone	
Vitalijs Pavlovs	Latvia	Ice hockey	Methylhexanamine	
Ben Payne	United Kingdom	Hockey	19-norandrosterone and 19-noretiocholanolone	
Michelle Payne	Australia	Jockey	Phentermine	
Claudia Pechstein	Germany	Speed skating		
Sean Penkywicz	United Kingdom	Rugby league	Stanozolol	
Jermell Pennie	United States	Basketball	Formestane	
Andres Pennisi	Argentina	Weightlifting	Clenbuterol	
Alberto Pensado	Spain	Weightlifting	Tetrahydrocannabidol	
Jhonny Peralta	Dominican Republic	Baseball	Performance-enhancing drugs	
Daniel Pereira	Portugal	Swimming	Stanozolol	
Kusal Perera	Sri Lanka	Cricket		
Jose Perez	Spain	Weightlifting	Oxandrolone, Epioxandrolone	
Neifi Pérez	Dominican Republic	Baseball	Stimulants (three times)	
Pascual Pérez	Dominican Republic	Baseball		
Wolfgang Perner	Austria	Biathlon	Violation of blood doping rules	
Hendrick Perrot	France	Volleyball	Cannabinoids	
Alessandro Petacchi	Italy	Cycling	Salbutamol	
Tim Peterson	United States	Baseball	Trenbolone	
Rumyana Petkova	Bulgaria	Weightlifting	Stanozolol	
Matt Peto	Canada	Canadian football		
Petros Petropoulos	Greece	Swimming	Caffeine	
Yevgeni Petrov	Russia	Cycling	EPO	
Igor Petrov	Russia	Weightlifting		
Andy Pettitte	United States	Baseball	Human growth hormone (self-admitted)	
Koleva Petya	Bulgaria	Weightlifting		
Michael Phelps	United States	Swimming	Cannabis (self-admitted)	
Michael Picotte	United States	Swimming	Refusal to submit to doping test	
Yuliya Pidlisna	Ukraine	Swimming	Stanozolol	
Jorge Piedra	United States	Baseball	Performance-enhancing substance	
Leonardo Piepoli	Italy	Cycling	CERA	
Caroline Pileggi	Australia	Weightlifting	Refusing a drug test	
Juan Pineda	United States	Cycling	19-norandrosterone	
Michael Pineda	Dominican Republic	Baseball	Hydrochlorothiazide	
Jürgen Pinter	Austria	Cross-country skiing	Violation of blood doping rules	
Omar Pinzon Garcia	Colombia	Swimming	Cocaine	
Keith Piper	United Kingdom	Cricket	Cannabis	
Maria Pipiliaridou	Greece	Weightlifting	Methyltrienolone, Buprenorphine	
Giuseppe Nicola Pisano	Italy	Water polo	Cannabinoids	
Yann Pishchikov	Russia	Fencing	Stanozolol, Methylhexaneamine	
Jennifer Piter	Aruba	Weightlifting	Oxilofrine	
Victor Osorio Pizzaro	Chile	Weightlifting	Metandienone	
Ivan Podshivalov	Russia	Rowing		
Adri van der Poel	Netherlands	Cycling	Strychnine	
Paul Pogba	France	Football (soccer)	Dehydroepiandrosterone	
Gevorik Poghosyan	Armenia	Weightlifting	Oxandrolone	
Zorik Poghosyan	Armenia	Weightlifting	Methylhexaneamine	
Aleksander Polaczek	Germany	Ice hockey	Missed test	
Jorge Polanco	Dominican Republic	Baseball	Stanozolol	
Claudia Poll	Costa Rica	Swimming	Nandrolone	
Andrea Pollack	East Germany	Swimming	Turinabol (self-admitted)	
Eric Polini	Canada	Canadian football		
Vasiliy Polovnikov	Russia	Weightlifting	Metandienone	
Anatoliy Polyakov	Russia	Swimming	Boldenone	
Vladimir Popov	Moldova	Weightlifting	Metandienone	
Valentina Popova	Russia	Weightlifting		
Alex Gabriel Popoviciu	Romania	Water polo	Methylhexaneamine	
Bobby Portis	United States	Basketball	Tramadol	
Nikola Portner	Switzerland	Handball	Methanphetamine	
Davide Possanzini	Italy	Football (soccer)	Missed test	
Alberto Puello	Dominican Republic	Boxing	Tested positive for Clomiphene	
Henry Prado Vargas	Costa Rica	Weightlifting	Boldenone	
Alvaro Prieto	Spain	Diving	Cannabis	
Jurickson Profar	Curaçao	Baseball	Chorionic gonadotropin	
Anastasia Proskurina	Russia	Wrestling		
Sandis Prūsis	Latvia	Bobsleigh	Anabolic steroids	(in Latvian)
Mariusz Pudzianowski	Poland	Strongmen		
César Puello	Dominican Republic	Baseball	Performance-enhancing drugs	
Mariano Puerta	Argentina	Tennis	Etilefrine, clenbuterol	
Shailaja Pujari	India	Weightlifting		
Hysen Pulaku	Albania	Weightlifting	Stanozolol	
Chitchanok Pulsabsakul	Thailand	Weightlifting	Methandienone	
Nauris Pundors	Latvia	Swimming	Anabolic steroids	(in Latvian)
Max Purcell	Australia	Tennis	IV infusion of vitamins above 100ml limit	
Olga Pyleva	Russia	Biathlon	Carphedon	
Caroline Pyzik	Canada	Taekwondo	Hydrochlorothiazide, triamterene	
