= Andy Hiraoka =

Ghanaian-Japanese Boxer (born 1996)

Personal information
- Nickname: The Blade
- Born: 平岡 アンディ ジャスティス; August 8, 1996 (age 30) Yokohama, Japan
- Height: 5 ft 11 1/2 in (182 cm)

Boxing career
- Weight class: Lightweight; Super lightweight
- Reach: 74 in (188 cm)
- Stance: Southpaw

Boxing record
- Total fights: 25
- Wins: 24
- Win by KO: 19
- Losses: 1

Andy Justice Hiraoka (born August 8, 1996) is a Japanese professional boxer. He is from Yokohama, Kanagawa Prefecture. He is a former World Boxing Organisation Asia Pacific Super Lightweight Champion.

== History ==
Andy was born in a small suburb of Yokohama in Japan to a Ghanaian father and a Japanese mother. He started boxing at the age of four due to his father's influence. When he was in elementary school, he appeared on Sanma's SUPER Karakuri TV as a "timid" boxing boy. At the time, his boxing skills were so slow that he was beaten up by his sister. He never skipped a day of practice, but he hated boxing so much. He was also teased and bullied for being half-Japanese and having dark skin, and was sometimes mocked for his shy personality. He joined the track and field club in junior high school, and competed in the National Athletic Meet in the middle distance while at Yokohama High School.

On December 3, 2013, he fought Katsuhiko Kudo in a four-round super featherweight bout at Korakuen Hall and won by TKO in the fourth round, 1 minute and 7 seconds, marking his debut with a win.

On December 21, 2014, as the East Japan Lightweight Rookie of the Year, he was scheduled to face Shogo Yamaguchi, representing the West, for the All-Japan Rookie of the Year title, but withdrew from the match due to the flu.

After losing the All-Japan Rookie of the Year award, Hiraoka left Japan and went to Los Angeles alone to train in the United States for about two years.

In September 2016, after returning to Japan, he transferred to Ohashi Boxing Gym .

On November 11, 2017, at the "DANGAN 200" event held at Korakuen Hall, he fought in the finals of the tournament to determine the first Japanese super lightweight youth champion against Takahiko Kobayashi, winning by TKO in 1 minute and 50 seconds of the fifth round to become the first Japanese super lightweight youth champion .

On September 11, 2018, he faced Ukyo Yoshikai at the 65th Phoenix Battle held at Korakuen Hall and won by TKO in the third round at 2 minutes and 2 seconds, successfully defending his youth title for the first time .

The match was scheduled to take place on April 8, 2019, but was canceled due to the arrest of his opponent .

On July 12, 2019, he faced former Japanese lightweight champion and IBF World Super Lightweight No. 13 Akihiro Kondo at Korakuen Hall and won by unanimous decision in the 10th round (97-93, 98-93, 98-92).

On October 3, 2019, he relinquished his Japanese Super Lightweight Youth Championship.

On November 26, 2019, it was announced that he had signed with Top Rank.

On November 30, 2019, he made his US debut at the Chelsea Ballroom at The Cosmopolitan in Las Vegas, Nevada, where he faced Rogelio Cázares and won by knockout in the second round, 2 minutes and 15 seconds.

On November 1, 2020, he fought Ricky Edwards at the MGM Grand Conference Center (The Bubble) at the MGM Grand in Las Vegas and won by TKO in the fourth round at 2 minutes and 20 seconds.

On February 11, 2021, he faced Yuta Akiyama at the charity boxing event “LEGEND” held at the National Yoyogi Stadium.

On March 11, 2021, he faced Japanese super lightweight Fumio Kimura at Korakuen Hall and won by TKO at 2 minutes and 15 seconds into the third round.

On October 19, 2021, the main event of "Phoenix Battle 81" took place at Korakuen Hall, where Hiraoka faced Sasaki Tsutomu, ranked 2nd in the Japanese and 3rd in the WBO Asia Pacific super lightweight division, and won by TKO in the 11th round at 1 minute 58 seconds to claim the title. At the weigh-in the day before, Sasaki was 1.8 kg over the super lightweight limit and was disqualified. At the weigh-in at 5 pm on the day of the match, Sasaki was within 8% of the super lightweight limit, so the match was made official, and the match was held under irregular rules whereby Hiraoka would only win the title if he won.

On February 28, 2022, he faced Aoki Christiano, the number one ranked Japanese super lightweight, at Korakuen Hall and won by TKO in the 10th round at 2 minutes and 16 seconds.

On June 7, 2022, he faced Shun Akaiwa, ranked 8th in the Japanese super lightweight division, at Saitama Super Arena and won by TKO in 1 minute and 24 seconds of the 6th round.

On September 13, 2022, he faced Alvin Lagumbay at Korakuen Hall and won by TKO at 2 minutes and 27 seconds in the second round, successfully defending his WBO Asia Pacific title for the third time.

On December 13, 2022, he faced Min Ho Jung on the undercard of the Naoya Inoue vs. Paul Butler fight at Ariake Arena, and won by TKO in the eighth round at 2 minutes and 6 seconds, successfully defending his WBO Asia Pacific title for the fourth time.

On January 16, 2023, he relinquished his Japanese super lightweight title.

On June 10, 2023, he relinquished his WBO Asia Pacific super lightweight title to pursue a world title challenge.

On September 3, 2024, at the Ariake Arena, he faced Ismael Barroso, the WBA World Super Lightweight interim champion, in a match to decide the WBA World Super Lightweight challenger. In the sixth round, he knocked Barroso down with a right hook, and in the eighth round, he cut his right eye with a left cross from Barroso. In the ninth round, he knocked Barroso down twice, and after Barroso's camp withdrew from the match, he won by TKO at 2 minutes and 58 seconds in the ninth round and earned the right to challenge the champion, Jose Valenzuela . However, since Barroso's interim title was not recognized by the JBC, which oversaw the match, it was not recognized as a title match, so the match was held as a challenger match, and Barroso, who lost, was stripped of his interim title according to JBC regulations.

=== WBA Super Lightweight Championship ===
==== Hiraoka vs. Russell ====
Hiraoka was scheduled to challenge Gary Antuanne Russell for his WBA super lightweight title on the undercard of Jake Paul vs. Gervonta Davis in Miami, Florida, on November 14, 2025. The fight was postponed when the event was cancelled due to Davis' legal issues. The bout was rescheduled to take place at T-Mobile Arena in Paradise, Nevada on February 21, 2026. Hiraoka lost via unanimous decision.

== Professional boxing record ==
25 fights	24 wins	1 loss
By knockout	19	0
By decision	5	1

No.	Result	Record	Opponent	Type	Round, time	Date	Location	Notes
25	Loss	24–1	Gary Antuanne Russell	UD	12	Feb 21, 2026	T-Mobile Arena, Paradise, Nevada, U.S.	For WBA super lightweight title
24	Win	24–0	Ismael Barroso	TKO	9 (12), 2:58	3 Sep 2024	Ariake Arena, Tokyo, Japan	
23	Win	23–0	Sebastian Diaz Maldanado	TKO	5 (8), 1:07	26 Dec 2023	Ariake Arena, Tokyo, Japan	
22	Win	22–0	Min Ho Jung	TKO	8 (12), 2:06	13 Dec 2022	Ariake Arena, Tokyo, Japan	Retained WBO Asia Pacific super lightweight title
21	Win	21–0	Alvin Lagumbay	TKO	2 (12), 2:27	13 Sep 2022	Korakuen Hall, Tokyo, Japan	Retained WBO Asia Pacific super lightweight title
20	Win	20–0	Shun Akaiwa	TKO	6 (10), 1:24	7 Jun 2022	Saitama Super Arena, Saitama, Japan	Retained Japanese and WBO Asia Pacific super lightweight titles
19	Win	19–0	Cristiano Aoqui	TKO	10 (12), 2:16	28 Feb 2022	Korakuen Hall, Tokyo, Japan	Retained Japanese and WBO Asia Pacific super lightweight titles
18	Win	18–0	Jin Sasaki	TKO	11 (12), 1:58	19 Oct 2021	Korakuen Hall, Tokyo, Japan	Won vacant Japanese and vacant WBO Asia Pacific super lightweight titles
17	Win	17–0	Fumisuke Kimura	TKO	3 (8), 2:15	11 Mar 2021	Korakuen Hall, Tokyo, Japan	
16	Win	16–0	Rickey Edwards	TKO	4 (8), 2:20	31 Oct 2020	MGM Grand Conference Center, Paradise, Nevada, U.S.	
15	Win	15–0	Rogelio Casarez	TKO	2 (8), 2:16	30 Nov 2019	Cosmopolitan of Las Vegas, Paradise, Nevada, U.S.	
14	Win	14–0	Akihiro Kondo	UD	10	12 Jul 2019	Korakuen Hall, Tokyo, Japan	
13	Win	13–0	Ukyo Yoshigai	TKO	3 (8), 2:02	11 Sep 2018	Korakuen Hall, Tokyo, Japan	Won Japanese Youth super lightweight title
12	Win	12–0	Fumisuke Kimura	UD	8	28 Feb 2018	Korakuen Hall, Tokyo, Japan	
11	Win	11–0	Takahiko Kobayashi	TKO	5 (8), 1:50	11 Nov 2017	Korakuen Hall, Tokyo, Japan	
10	Win	10–0	Ukyo Yoshigai	TKO	3 (6), 0:46	23 Aug 2017	Korakuen Hall, Tokyo, Japan	
9	Win	9–0	Shogo Yamaguchi	TKO	6 (8), 1:39	21 May 2017	Ariake Coliseum, Tokyo, Japan	
8	Win	8–0	Natee Yongraksa	KO	1 (6), 1:44	30 Dec 2016	Ariake Coliseum, Tokyo, Japan	
7	Win	7–0	Nakharin Phromchak	TKO	3 (6), 2:54	3 Oct 2016	Korakuen Hall, Tokyo, Japan	
6	Win	6–0	Shintaro Nakamura	UD	5	2 Nov 2014	Korakuen Hall, Tokyo, Japan	
5	Win	5–0	Shoma Sekine	TKO	4 (4), 2:25	25 Sep 2014	Korakuen Hall, Tokyo, Japan	
4	Win	4–0	Yoshihito Takahashi	UD	4	20 Jun 2014	Korakuen Hall, Tokyo, Japan	
3	Win	3–0	Susumu Nakata	TKO	3 (4), 2:15	4 Apr 2014	Korakuen Hall, Tokyo, Japan	
2	Win	2–0	Yoshikuni Hashiguchi	UD	4	10 Jan 2014	Korakuen Hall, Tokyo, Japan	
1	Win	1–0	Katsuhiko Kudo	TKO	4 (4), 1:07	3 Dec 2013	Korakuen Hall, Tokyo, Japan	
