= Gary Antuanne Russell =

American boxer (born 1996)

Personal information
- Born: June 14, 1996 (age 30) Capitol Heights, Maryland, U.S.
- Height: 5 ft 10 in (178 cm)
- Weight: Light welterweight

Boxing career
- Reach: 69 in (175 cm)
- Stance: Southpaw

Boxing record
- Total fights: 20
- Wins: 19
- Win by KO: 17
- Losses: 1

Gary Antuanne Russell (born June 14, 1996) is an American professional boxer who has held the World Boxing Association (WBA) super lightweight title since 2025. As an amateur, he represented the United States in the light welterweight division at the 2016 Summer Olympics, but was controversially eliminated in the third bout. He is the younger brother of former WBC featherweight champion Gary Russell Jr.

All five brothers in his family are named Gary after their father Gary Russell, Sr. Four of them are competitive boxers, trained by their father.

== Professional career ==
On May 20, 2017, Russell won his professional debut by first-round technical knockout (TKO) against Josh Ross.

Russell was scheduled to face Alberto Puello for the interim WBC super lightweight title at MGM Grand Garden Arena in Las Vegas on June 15, 2024. He lost the fight by split decision.

=== WBA super lightweight championship ===
==== Russell vs. Valenzuela ====
Russell faced José Valenzuela for the WBA super lightweight title at Barclays Center in Brooklyn on March 1, 2025. He won the bout by unanimous decision.

==== Russell vs. Hiraoka ====
Russell was scheduled to make the first defense of his WBA super lightweight title against Andy Hiraoka on the undercard of Jake Paul vs. Gervonta Davis in Miami, Florida, on November 14, 2025. The fight was postponed when the event was cancelled due to Davis' legal issues. The boit was rescheduled to take place at T-Mobile Arena in Paradise, Nevada on February 21, 2026. Russell won via unanimous decision.

== Professional boxing record ==
20 fights	19 wins	1 loss
By knockout	17	0
By decision	2	1

No.	Result	Record	Opponent	Type	Round, time	Date	Location	Notes
20	Win	19–1	Andy Hiraoka	UD	12	Feb 21, 2026	T-Mobile Arena, Paradise, Nevada, U.S.	Retained WBA super lightweight title
19	Win	18–1	José Valenzuela	UD	12	Mar 1, 2025	Barclays Center, New York City, New York, U.S.	Won WBA super lightweight title
18	Loss	17–1	Alberto Puello	SD	12	Jun 15, 2024	MGM Grand Garden Arena, Paradise, Nevada, U.S.	For vacant WBC interim super lightweight title
17	Win	17–0	Kent Cruz	KO	1 (10), 2:39	Aug 12, 2023	MGM National Harbor, Oxon Hill, Maryland, U.S.	
16	Win	16–0	Rances Barthelemy	TKO	6 (10), 0:50	Jul 30, 2022	Barclays Center, New York City, New York, U.S.	
15	Win	15–0	Viktor Postol	TKO	10 (10), 2:29	Feb 26, 2022	Cosmopolitan of Las Vegas, Paradise, Nevada, U.S.	Won vacant WBA Continental Americas super lightweight title
14	Win	14–0	Jovanie Santiago	RTD	6 (10), 3:00	May 29, 2021	Dignity Health Sports Park, Carson, California, U.S.	
13	Win	13–0	Jose Marrufo	KO	1 (10), 3:00	Feb 8, 2020	PPL Center, Allentown, Pennsylvania, U.S.	
12	Win	12–0	Juan Huertas	TKO	2 (10), 2:05	Nov 2, 2019	MGM National Harbor, Oxon Hill, Maryland, U.S.	
11	Win	11–0	Luis Castillo	KO	1 (8), 0:30	Sep 21, 2019	Rabobank Theater, Bakersfield, California, U.S.	
10	Win	10–0	Larry Ventus	TKO	3 (8), 3:00	Jul 13, 2019	Minneapolis Armory, Minneapolis, Minnesota, U.S.	
9	Win	9–0	Marcos Mojica	KO	4 (8), 2:56	May 18, 2019	Barclays Center, New York City, New York, U.S.	
8	Win	8–0	Roberto Almazan	TKO	2 (6), 1:13	Jan 26, 2019	Barclays Center, New York City, New York, U.S.	
7	Win	7–0	Jose Arturo Esquivel	TKO	1 (8), 0:55	Aug 4, 2018	Nassau Coliseum, Uniondale, New York, U.S.	
6	Win	6–0	Wilmer Rodriguez	KO	1 (6), 1:04	May 19, 2018	MGM National Harbor, Oxon Hill, Maryland, U.S.	
5	Win	5–0	Andrew Rodgers	TKO	3 (4), 1:24	Apr 21, 2018	Barclays Center, New York City, New York, U.S.	
4	Win	4–0	Keasen Freeman	TKO	2 (4), 2:59	Mar 3, 2018	Barclays Center, New York City, New York, U.S.	
3	Win	3–0	Larry Yanez	TKO	1 (4), 2:01	Nov 21, 2017	The Coliseum, St. Petersburg, Florida, U.S.	
2	Win	2–0	Jesus Lule	TKO	1 (4), 0:19	Sep 10, 2017	Sands Casino Resort, Bethlehem, Pennsylvania, U.S.	
1	Win	1–0	Josh Ross	TKO	1 (4), 2:25	May 20, 2017	MGM National Harbor, Oxon Hill, Maryland, U.S.	

== See also ==
- List of male boxers
- List of southpaw stance boxers
- Notable boxing families
- List of world light-welterweight boxing champions

Sporting positions
Amateur boxing titles
Previous: Julian Rodriguez	Golden Gloves light-welterweight champion 2014	Next: Jaron Ennis
Regional boxing titles
Vacant Title last held by Petros Ananyan	WBA Continental Americas light-welterweight champion February 26, 2022 - July 2022; Vacated	Vacant Title next held by Kenneth Sims Jr.
World boxing titles
Preceded by José Valenzuela	WBA light-welterweight champion March 1, 2025 – present	Incumbent
