= Chris Colbert =

American boxer (born 1996)

Personal information
- Nickname: Prime Time
- Born: September 27, 1996 (age 30) Brooklyn, New York City, New York, U.S.
- Height: 5 ft 7 in (170 cm)
- Weight: Super featherweight; Lightweight

Boxing career
- Reach: 69 1/2 in (177 cm)
- Stance: Orthodox

Boxing record
- Total fights: 21
- Wins: 18
- Win by KO: 6
- Losses: 3

Chris Colbert (born September 27, 1996) is an American former professional boxer who held the WBA interim super featherweight title from 2020 to August 2021.

== Amateur career ==
In 2012, Colbert won national Silver Gloves in the 14 to 15 group in the 85 pound weight class. He also won the National Junior Olympics in the 95 pound weight class. In 2014, Colbert won the New York Golden Gloves in the flyweight division. He also was a semi finalist in the National Golden Gloves. In 2015, Colbert won the USA National Championships in the Lightweight division, by winning, Colbert was qualified to compete in the U.S. Olympic trials, but bypassed the trials to instead turn professional. Colbert ended his amateur career with a record of 103-3.

== Professional career ==
Colbert made his professional debut on May 29, 2015, scoring a second-round technical knockout (TKO) victory over Marquis Pierce at the Barclays Center in New York City. He had three more fights in 2015; a fourth-round TKO win over Benjamin Burgos in June and unanimous decision (UD) victories over Jose Carmona and Derrick Bivins in September and December respectively.

He only fought once in 2016, scoring a UD win over Antonio Dubose in June. Following two more UD victories in 2017 over Wilfredo Garriga in March and Titus Williams in November, Colbert defeated Austin Dulay via seventh-round corner retirement (RTD) in April 2018. His second and final fight of that year was a UD win over Fatiou Fassinou in September.

He secured three more wins in the first half of 2019; a UD against Joshuah Hernandez in January; a second-round TKO over Mario Briones in April; and a UD against Alberto Mercado in June.

=== Colbert vs. Beltran Jr. ===
His first attempt at a professional title came on September 21, 2019, against two time world title challenger Miguel Beltrán Jr. at the Rabobank Theater in Bakersfield, California. Colbert won the bout via first-round KO to capture the vacant NABA-USA lightweight title.

=== Colbert vs. Corrales ===
Colbert was booked to face Jezreel Corrales for the vacant WBA interim super featherweight title on January 18, 2020. Corrales was ranked #10 by the WBA at super featherweight. He won the fight by unanimous decision, with scores of 116–111, 117–110 and 117–110.

=== Colbert vs. Arboleda ===
Colbert made his first interim title defense against Jaime Arboleda on December 12, 2020. Arboleda was ranked #4 by the WBA at super featherweight. He won the fight by an eleventh-round technical knockout.

=== Colbert vs. Nyambayar ===
Colbert made his second title defense against the one-time WBC featherweight title challenger Tugstsogt Nyambayar on July 3, 2021 after originally scheduled to face Yuriorkis Gamboa but pulled out due to a rib injury. Nyambayar was ranked #4 by the WBA at super featherweight. He won the fight by unanimous decision, with scores of 117–111, 118–110 and 118–110.

=== Colbert vs. Garcia ===
On August 25, 2021, the WBA eliminated all of their interim championships, with the intent of consolidating titles across weight classes. Accordingly, Colbert earned was designated as the mandatory challenger for the WBA (Regular) super featherweight champion Roger Gutiérrez. They were expect to face each other on February 26, 2022, at the Cosmopolitan in Las Vegas, Nevada. Gutiérrez withdrew from the bout two weeks before it was supposed to take place, as he tested positive for COVID-19. Colbert was rescheduled to face Hector Luis Garcia, in a WBA super featherweight title eliminator. In a surprise upset, the unheralded Garcia dominated the heavy favorite Colbert, knocking Colbert down in the seventh round and winning a unanimous decision with judges' scorecards of 119–108 and 118–109 twice.

== Professional boxing record ==
21 fights	18 wins	3 losses
By knockout	6	2
By decision	12	1

No.	Result	Record	Opponent	Type	Round, time	Date	Location	Notes
21	Win	18–3	Blas Ezequiel Caro	UD	8	Oct 18, 2025	Barclays Center, New York City, New York, U.S.	
20	Loss	17–3	Omar Salcido	KO	9 (12), 1:02	Oct 16, 2024	ProBox Event Center, Plant City, Florida, U.S.	
19	Loss	17–2	José Valenzuela	KO	6 (12), 1:46	Dec 16, 2023	Minneapolis Armory, Minneapolis, Minnesota, U.S.	
18	Win	17–1	José Valenzuela	UD	10	Mar 25, 2023	MGM Grand Garden Arena, Paradise, Nevada, U.S.	
17	Loss	16–1	Héctor García	UD	12	Feb 26, 2022	Cosmopolitan, Las Vegas, Nevada, U.S.	For vacant WBA Gold super featherweight title
16	Win	16–0	Tugstsogt Nyambayar	UD	12	Jul 3, 2021	Dignity Health Sports Park, Carson, California, U.S.	Retained WBA interim super featherweight title
15	Win	15–0	Jaime Arboleda	TKO	11 (12), 1:37	Dec 12, 2020	Mohegan Sun Arena, Montville, Connecticut, U.S.	Retained WBA interim super featherweight title
14	Win	14–0	Jezreel Corrales	UD	12	Jan 18, 2020	Liacouras Center, Philadelphia, Pennsylvania, U.S.	Won vacant WBA interim super featherweight title
13	Win	13–0	Miguel Beltrán Jr.	KO	1 (10), 2:57	Sep 21, 2019	Rabobank Theater, Bakersfield, California, U.S.	Won vacant NABA–USA lightweight title
12	Win	12–0	Alberto Mercado	UD	8	Jun 23, 2019	Mandalay Bay Events Center, Paradise, Nevada, U.S.	
11	Win	11–0	Mario Briones	TKO	2 (10), 1:59	Apr 13, 2019	Minneapolis Armory, Minneapolis, Minnesota, U.S.	
10	Win	10–0	Joshuah Hernandez	UD	8	Jan 26, 2019	Barclays Center, New York City, New York, U.S.	
9	Win	9–0	Fatiou Fassinou	UD	8	Sep 8, 2018	Barclays Center, New York City, New York, U.S.	
8	Win	8–0	Austin Dulay	RTD	7 (8), 3:00	Apr 13, 2018	Minneapolis Armory, Minneapolis, Minnesota, U.S.	
7	Win	7–0	Titus Williams	UD	8	Nov 4, 2017	Barclays Center, New York City, New York, U.S.	
6	Win	6–0	Wilfredo Garriga	UD	6	Mar 17, 2017	Santander Arena, Reading, Pennsylvania, U.S.	
5	Win	5–0	Antonio Dubose	UD	6	Jun 28, 2016	Sands Event Center, Bethlehem, Pennsylvania, U.S.	
4	Win	4–0	Derrick Bivins	UD	6	Dec 29, 2015	Sands Event Center, Bethlehem, Pennsylvania, U.S.	
3	Win	3–0	Jose Carmona	UD	4	Sep 22, 2015	Sands Event Center, Bethlehem, Pennsylvania, U.S.	
2	Win	2–0	Benjamin Burgos	TKO	4 (4), 1:48	Jun 27, 2015	Sands Event Center, Bethlehem, Pennsylvania, U.S.	
1	Win	1–0	Marquis Pierce	TKO	2 (4), 1:31	May 29, 2015	Barclays Center, New York City, New York, U.S.	

Sporting positions
Regional boxing titles
Vacant Title last held by Teófimo López	NABA-USA lightweight champion September 21, 2019 – January 18, 2020; Won interim world 130lb title	Vacant Title next held by Nahir Albright
Major world boxing titles
Vacant Title last held by Jezreel Corrales	WBA super featherweight champion Interim title January 18, 2020 – August 25, 2021	Title discontinued
