= Light welterweight =

Weight class in boxing and kickboxing

Light welterweight, also known as junior welterweight or super lightweight, is a weight class in combat sports.

== Boxing ==
=== Professional boxing ===
In professional boxing, light welterweight is contested between the lightweight and welterweight divisions, in which boxers weigh above 61.2kg or 135 pounds and up to 63.5 kg or 140 Ibs. The first champion of this weight class was Pinky Mitchell in 1922, though he was only awarded his championship by a vote of the readers of the Boxing Blade magazine.

There was not widespread acceptance of this new weight division in its early years, and the New York State Athletic Commission withdrew recognition of it in 1930. The National Boxing Association continued to recognize it until its champion, Barney Ross relinquished the title in 1935 to concentrate on regaining the welterweight championship.

A few commissions recognized bouts in the 1940s as being for the light welterweight title, but the modern beginnings of this championship date from 1959 when Carlos Ortiz won the vacant title with a victory over Kenny Lane. Both the World Boxing Association (WBA) and the World Boxing Council (WBC) recognized the same champions until 1967, when the WBC stripped Paul Fuji of the title and matched Pedro Adigue and Adolph Pruitt for their version of the championship. Adigue won a fifteen-round decision. The International Boxing Federation (IBF) recognized Aaron Pryor as its first champion in 1984. Hector Camacho became the first World Boxing Organization (WBO) champion with his victory against Ray Mancini in 1989.

==== Current world champions ====
Sanctioning Body	Reign Began	Champion	Record	Defenses
WBA	March 1, 2025	Gary Antuanne Russell	19–1 (17 KO)	1
WBC	January 10, 2026	Dalton Smith	19–0 (14 KO)	0
IBF		vacant		
WBO	January 31, 2026	Shakur Stevenson	25–0 (11 KO)	0

==== Current world rankings ====
===== The Ring =====
As of January 31, 2026.

Keys:

C Current The Ring world champion

Rank	Name	Record	Title(s)
C	Shakur Stevenson	25–0 (11 KO)	WBO
1	Dalton Smith	19–0 (14 KO)	WBC
2	Richardson Hitchins	20–0 (8 KO)	IBF
3	Alberto Puello	24–1 (10 KO)	
4	Arnold Barboza Jr.	32–1 (11 KO)	
5	Gary Antuanne Russell	18–1 (17 KO)	WBA
6	Sandor Martín	43–4 (15 KO)	
7	Subriel Matías	23–3 (22 KO)	
8	Adam Azim	14–0 (11 KO)	
9	Lindolfo Delgado	23–0 (16 KO)	
10	Andy Hiraoka	24–0 (19 KO)	

===== BoxRec =====
As of 31 January 2026.

Rank	Name	Record	Title(s)
1	Shakur Stevenson	25–0 (11 KO)	WBO & The Ring
2	Dalton Smith	19–0 (14 KO)	WBC
3	Keyshawn Davis	14–0 (10 KO)	
4	Teofimo Lopez	22–2 (13 KO)	
5	Richardson Hitchins	20–0 (8 KO)	IBF
6	Adam Azim	14–0 (11 KO)	
7	Arnold Barboza Jr.	32–1 (11 KO)	
8	Arthur Biyarslanov	20–0 (16 KO)	
9	Ernesto Mercado	18–0 (17 KO)	
10	Khariton Agrba	17–1 (9 KO)	

=== Amateur boxing ===
In amateur boxing, light welterweight is a weight class for fighters weighing up to 64 kilograms. For the 1952 Summer Olympics, the division was created when the span from 54 to 67 kg was changed from three weight classes (featherweight, lightweight, and welterweight) to four. Perhaps the most famous amateur light welterweight champion is Sugar Ray Leonard, who went on to an impressive professional career.

==== Olympic Champions ====
- 1952 – Charles Adkins (USA)
- 1956 – Vladimir Yengibaryan (URS)
- 1960 – Bohumil Nemeček (TCH)
- 1964 – Jerzy Kulej (POL)
- 1968 – Jerzy Kulej (POL)
- 1972 – Ray Seales (USA)
- 1976 – Ray Leonard (USA)
- 1980 – Patrizio Oliva (ITA)
- 1984 – Jerry Page (USA)
- 1988 – Vyacheslav Yanovskiy (URS)
- 1992 – Héctor Vinent (CUB)
- 1996 – Héctor Vinent (CUB)
- 2000 – Muhammadqodir Abdullaev (UZB)
- 2004 – Manus Boonjumnong (THA)
- 2008 – Felix Diaz (DOM)
- 2012 – Roniel Iglesias (CUB)
- 2016 – Fazliddin Gaibnazarov (UZB)

=== Notable fighters ===
- Saensak Muangsurin
- Saoul Mamby
- Tippy Larkin
- Aaron Pryor
- Carlos Morocho Hernández
- Antonio Cervantes
- Julio César Chávez
- Oscar De La Hoya
- Pernell Whitaker
- Kostya Tszyu
- Duilio Loi
- Eddie Perkins
- Erik Morales
- Ricky Hatton
- Manny Pacquiao
- Floyd Mayweather Jr.
- Amir Khan
- Juan Manuel Márquez
- Nicolino Locche
- Micky Ward
- Arturo Gatti
- Marijan Beneš
- Danny García
- Devon Alexander
- Ruslan Provodnikov
- Alexis Arguello
- Timothy Bradley
- Wilfred Benítez
- Miguel Cotto
- Terence Crawford
- Julius Indongo
- Paulie Malignaggi
- Junior Witter
- Josh Taylor

== Kickboxing ==
- In the International Kickboxing Federation (IKF), Super lightweight is 132.1 - 137 lbs or 60.04 - 62.27 kg, & Light welterweight is 137.1 - 142 lbs or 62.31 - 64.54 kg.

== Lethwei ==
The World Lethwei Championship recognizes the light welterweight division with an upper limit of 63.5 kg (140 lb). In World Lethwei Championship Antonio Faria is the Light welterweight Champion.
