= Miguel Cotto vs. Yuri Foreman =

Boxing match

Stadium Slugfest
- Date: June 5, 2010
- Venue: Yankee Stadium, New York City, New York, U.S.
- Title(s) on the line: WBA super-welterweight title

Tale of the tape
Boxer	(Israel) Yuri Foreman	(Puerto Rico) Miguel Cotto
Nickname		"Junito"
Hometown	Gomel, Belarus	Caguas, Puerto Rico
Purse	$750,000	$2,000,000
Pre-fight record	28–0 (1) (8 KO)	34–2 (27 KO)
Age	29 years, 10 months	29 years, 7 months
Height	5 ft 11 in (180 cm)	5 ft 7 in (170 cm)
Weight	154 lb (70 kg)	153 1/2 lb (70 kg)
Style	Orthodox	Orthodox
Recognition	WBA; Super Welterweight Champion; The Ring; No. 6 Ranked Light Middleweight	WBA; No. 5 Ranked Super Welterweight; The Ring; No. 5 Ranked Welterweight

Result
- Cotto via 9th round TKO

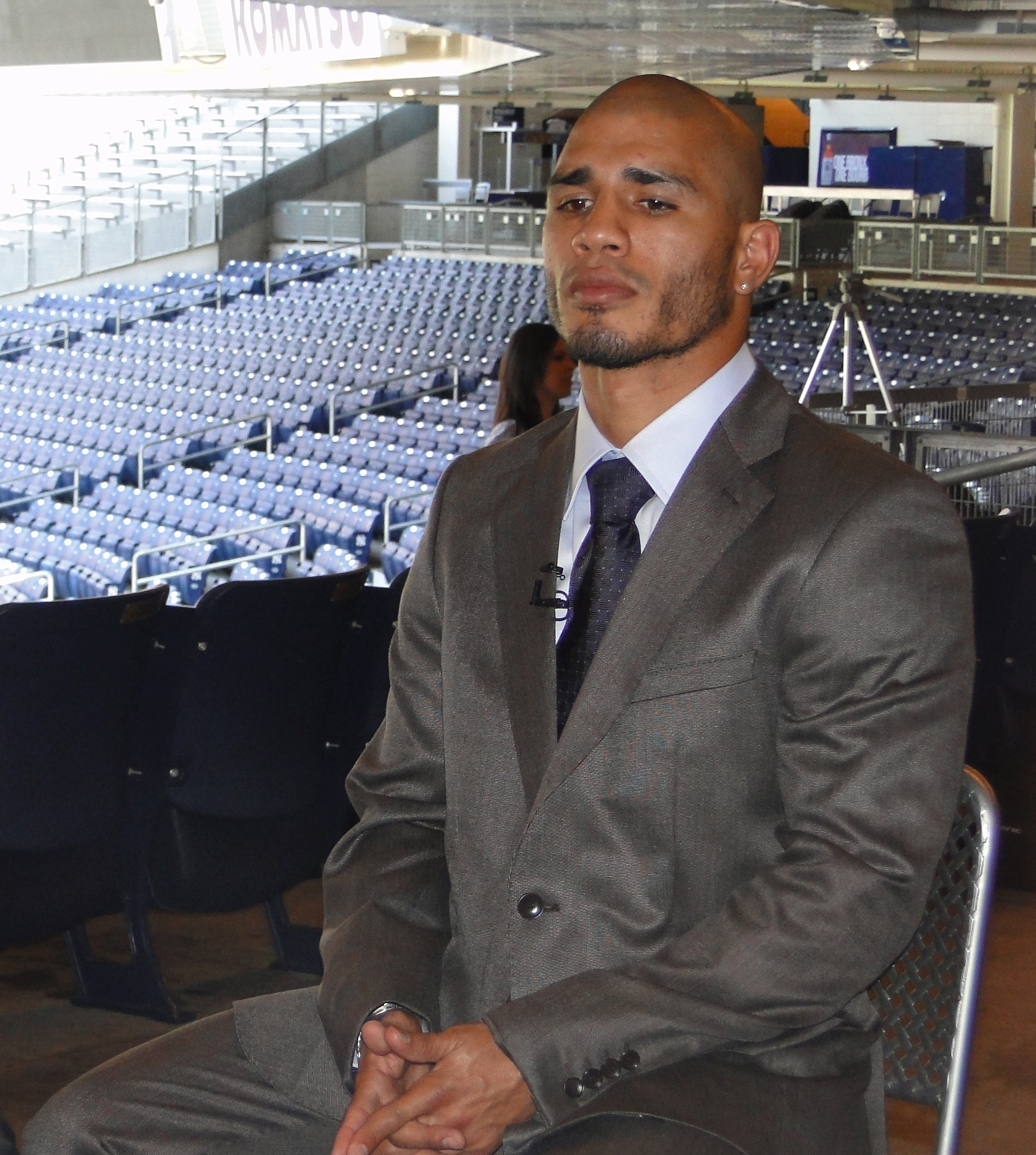
Cotto at the Yankee Stadium on June 2, 2010.

Miguel Cotto vs. Yuri Foreman, billed as Stadium Slugfest, was a boxing super welterweight fight for the WBA Super Welterweight championship. The bout was held on June 5, 2010, at Yankee Stadium, in New York City, United States. Cotto won the fight via technical knockout in the ninth round.

Cotto, a three time world champion, was coming from a TKO loss at Welterweight to Manny Pacquiao. After the fight the Puerto Rican moved up to the Junior Middleweight division to challenge Foreman for his WBA title. At the other side, the Israeli fighter was coming from a win against Daniel Santos.

The fight also showcased the return of boxing to The Bronx. It was the first big match in the area since September 1976, when Muhammad Ali outpointed Ken Norton in the first Yankee Stadium.

== Background ==
=== Miguel Cotto ===
Immediately after the fight against Joshua Clottey, negotiations began to pursue a contest against Manny Pacquiao. Even before Pacquiao defeated Ricky Hatton, Bob Arum, who represents both Cotto and Pacquiao, stated that he was interested in this matchup. Subsequently, Pacquiao expressed interest in fighting Cotto. The fight was sanctioned as a world title fight in the welterweight division, where the weight limit is 147 pounds, however Cotto's camp agreed to fight at a catchweight of 145 pounds to accommodate Pacquiao's smaller physique. Cotto's camp also conceded the larger share of the purse to Pacquiao, who received a 65% share of pay-per-view buys, compared to Cotto's 35% share.

On November 14, 2009, Pacquiao defeated Cotto by TKO 55 seconds into the 12th round, dethroning Cotto as a WBO welterweight champion. The fight generated 1.25 million buys and 70 million dollars in domestic pay-per-view revenue, making it the most watched boxing event of 2009. Pacquiao earned around 22 million dollars for his part in the fight, whilst Cotto earned around 12 million dollars. Pacquiao-Cotto also generated a live gate of $8,847,550 from an official crowd of 15,930.

=== Yuri Foreman ===
On November 14, 2009, Foreman defeated Daniel Santos by a 12-round unanimous decision to become the new WBA super welterweight champion and Israel's first WBA champion. He also became Israel's second world boxing champion, following about a month after Hagar Finer won the Women's International Boxing Federation bantamweight world championship.

In early January 2010, Foreman began talks with Bob Arum to arrange for himself and Filipino boxer seven-division world champion Manny Pacquiao, to meet on March 13, 2010. However, Pacquiao rejected the offer.

== Pre-fight information ==
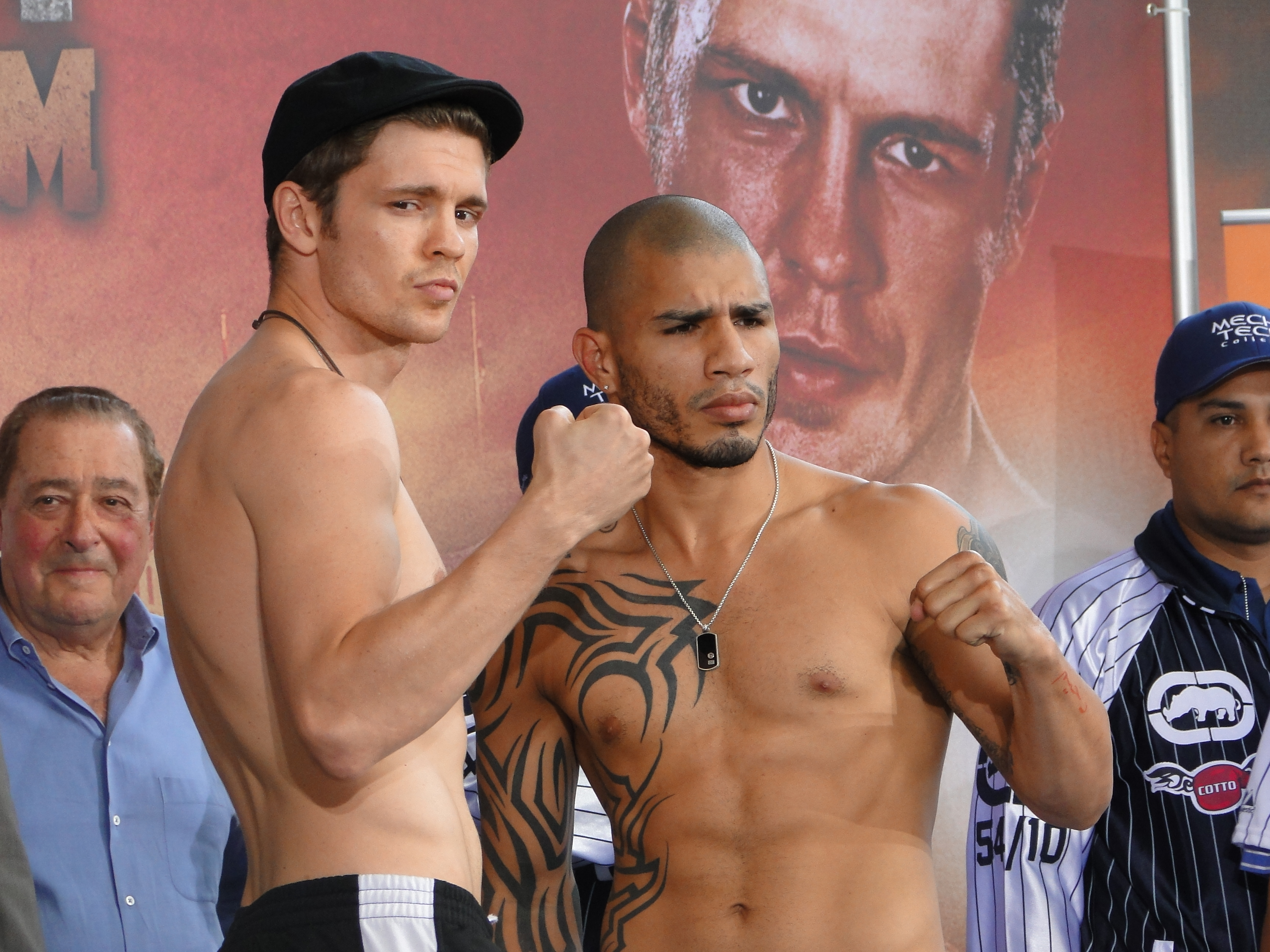
Foreman (left) and Cotto at the official weigh-in on June 4, 2010.

The match showcased the return of boxing to The Bronx. It was the first major bout in the area since September 1976, when Muhammad Ali fought Ken Norton in the original Yankee Stadium.

This was Cotto's first fight with his new trainer, Emanuel Steward. The latter was already handling Heavyweight champion Wladimir Klitschko. Joe Santiago, who became Cotto's trainer after Evangelista Cotto's departure, was still part of the Puerto Rican's corner. Steward joined Cotto's corner with Santiago, Joe Chavez and Jose Cotto. The American trainer expected an impressive win by his boxer and this bout showed what Cotto had left in his skills, after taking a lot of punishment against several recent opponents such as Antonio Margarito, Joshua Clottey and Manny Pacquiao.

Cotto weighted 153 pounds, while Foreman came in at 154.

== The fight ==
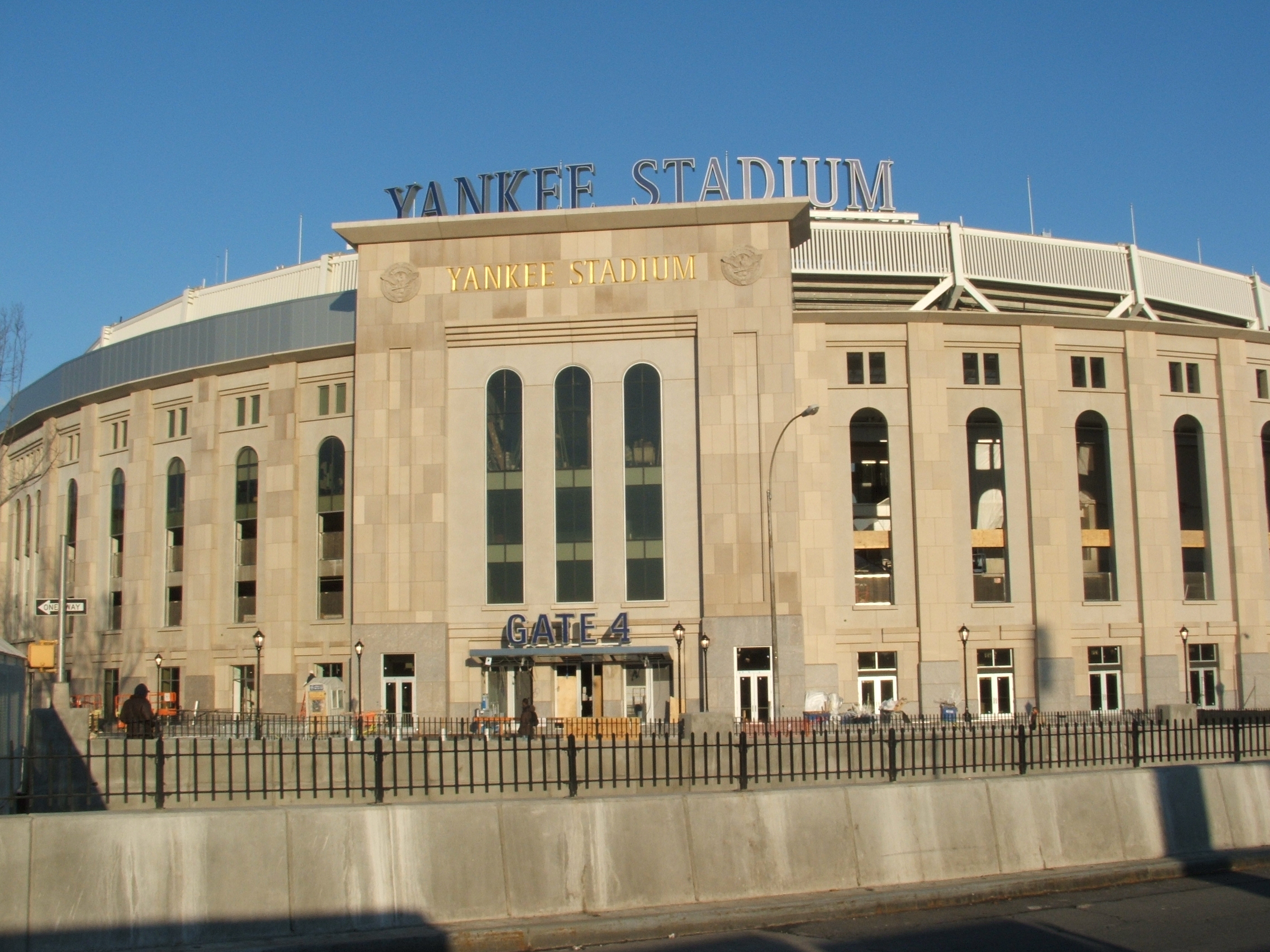
Yankee Stadium, site of the "Stadium Slugfest".

Cotto tried to put pressure from the first round, connecting with his jab and some hard shots. He stunned his opponent with a quick jab before the end of the round. Foreman came out more active in the second round, using his footwork and jab. The two traded hard combinations in the final minute; Cotto was able to hit Foreman with a solid right hand. Round three began with the same way, with the two boxer trading hard hooks; Foreman threw some good shot, but Cotto hit the Israeli fighter with some of his own. In the fourth round, Foreman caught Cotto with three hard shots, followed by a hard right a minute later. The Puerto Rican continued to use the jab and put pressure. At the end of the fourth, Foreman's nose began to bleed. At the start of the fifth, the two started to trade punches and hard left hooks until the end. Cotto used his quick punches and moved to outbox Foreman in round six. Foreman went down from a slip in the 7th Round when his already braced, the right knee buckled. He got back to his feet and continued fighting despite heavily favoring the knee.

After a few more falls from the knee giving out and Cotto beginning to land, Foreman's trainer Joe Grier threw in the towel midway through the 8th Round. Naturally, the ring filled with both camps and officials. Cotto and Foreman even embraced, believing it was over. Feeling that Foreman was in no immediate danger, however, referee Arthur Mercante Jr. asked him if he wanted to continue, and he did. While the crowd was not sure what was happening, the ring was cleared after a delay of a couple of minutes and the fight resumed with about half the round remaining. Cotto landed a left hook to the body and Foreman went down 42 seconds into the 9th Round, seemingly as much from the blow as from his inability to put weight on the leg, and Mercante called off the fight.

At the time of the stoppage, Cotto was leading in all the judges' scorecards by 79–73 twice and 78–74.

== Punch stats ==
- Total punches: Cotto landed 115 out of 329 (35%), whereas Foreman landed 71 out of 281 (25%).
- Total jabs: Cotto landed 39 out of 165 (24%), whereas Foreman landed 21 out of 145 (14%).
- Total power punches: Cotto landed 76 out of 164 (46%), whereas Foreman landed 50 out of 136 (37%).

== Aftermath ==
With this victory, Cotto took the WBA junior middleweight title becoming a four time world champion.

Foreman has since revealed that he will need knee surgery due to the injury he sustained in the bout. The Israeli boxer also expressed his interest in a potential rematch with Cotto. However, it is not likely to happen, as Cotto said he prefers to go after only popular fighters for the big money fights and Foreman does not fall into the category. A week after the Cotto-Foreman bout, the Israeli fighter had his right knee successfully operated; Foreman has also revealed that he had been carrying his knee problem for 14 years, since he was 15 years old, and had never had it operated on.

Miguel Cotto also revealed that he will keep Emanuel Steward as his head trainer.

The HBO World Championship Boxing telecast of Yuri Foreman vs. Miguel Cotto was the highest rated boxing main event in 2010 to that point on the network. The live telecast from Yankee Stadium on Saturday plus a replay Sunday morning was watched by about 1.9 million viewers.

== Undercard ==
Confirmed bouts:

=== Televised ===
- Light Middleweight bout: (Poland) Paweł Wolak vs. (Republic of Ireland) James Moore

Wolak defeated Moore via unanimous decision (97-93, 97-93, 96-94).

- Featherweight bout: (Puerto Rico) Jorge Díaz vs. (South Korea) Jae Sung Lee

Díaz defeated Lee via technical knockout. The fight was stopped at 1:54 of round six.

- NABF and WBO NABO light middleweight title bout: (United States) Vanes Martirosyan vs. (United States) Joe Greene

Martirosyan defeated Greene via unanimous decision (96-93, 98-91, 96-93) to retain the NABF and WBO NABO light middleweight titles.

=== Untelevised ===
- Lightweight bout: (Puerto Rico) Abner Cotto vs. (United States) Edgar Portillo

Cotto defeated Portillo via unanimous decision (59-55, 59-55, 58-56).

- Light Welterweight bout: (Puerto Rico) Christian Martínez vs. (United States) Jonathan Cuba

Martínez defeated Cuba via technical knockout. The fight was stopped at 1:18 of round four.

- Welterweight bout: (United States) Terry Baterbaugh vs. (United States) Tommy Rainone

Baterbaugh defeated Portillo via unanimous decision (59-55, 59-55, 60-54).

- Lightweight bout: (Puerto Rico) Juan González vs. (United States) Juan Lucio

González defeated Lucio via unanimous decision (39-37, 39-37, 40-36).

== Broadcasting ==
Country	Broadcaster
Australia	Main Event
Hungary	Sport 1
Philippines	Studio 23 / ABS-CBN
United States	HBO

Preceded by vs. Daniel Santos	Yuri Foreman's bouts 5 June 2010	Succeeded by vs. Paweł Wolak
Preceded by vs. Manny Pacquiao	Miguel Cotto's bouts 5 June 2010	Succeeded by vs. Ricardo Mayorga
