= Manny Pacquiao vs. Miguel Cotto =

2009 boxing match

Firepower
- Date: November 14, 2009
- Venue: MGM Grand Garden Arena, Paradise, Nevada, U.S.
- Title(s) on the line: WBO welterweight title

Tale of the tape
| Boxer | Miguel Cotto | Manny Pacquiao |
| Nickname | Junito | Pac-Man |
| Hometown | Caguas, Puerto Rico | Saranggani Province, Philippines |
| Pre-fight record | 34–1 (27 KO) | 49–3–2 (37 KO) |
| Age | 29 years | 30 years, 10 months |
| Height | 5 ft 8 in (173 cm) | 5 ft 6 1/2 in (169 cm) |
| Weight | 145 lb (66 kg) | 144 lb (65 kg) |
| Style | Orthodox | Southpaw |
| Recognition | WBO; Welterweight Champion; The Ring; No. 3 Ranked Welterweight; The Ring No. 7 ranked pound-for-pound fighter 2-division world champion | IBO and The Ring; Light Welterweight Champion; The Ring No. 1 ranked pound-for-pound fighter 6-division world champion |

Result
- Pacquiao wins via 12th-round TKO

Manny Pacquiao vs. Miguel Cotto, billed as Firepower, was a boxing match for the WBO welterweight championship. The bout was held on November 14, 2009, at the MGM Grand Garden Arena, in Las Vegas, Nevada, United States. Pacquiao won the fight via technical knockout in the twelfth round.

== Background ==
The fight was sanctioned as a world title fight in the welterweight division, where the weight limit is 147 pounds, however Cotto's camp agreed to fight at a catchweight of 145 pounds to accommodate Pacquiao's smaller physique. Cotto's camp also conceded the larger share of the purse to Pacquiao, who received a 65% share of pay-per-view buys, compared to Cotto's 35% share.

== The fight ==
=== Rounds 1–8 ===
In the opening round both fighters were tentative, although Cotto appeared to have the edge, as he connected with several solid jabs that arguably won him the round. However, from the second round onwards Pacquiao picked up the pace, as he knocked Cotto down in round three with a right hook, and then again in round four with a left uppercut. In round five Cotto mounted a brief comeback and arguably won the round, but thereafter Pacquiao went on to dominate the fight. Cotto had some success when he managed to pin Pacquiao against the ropes, although Pacquiao later admitted that he had allowed this to happen, as he wanted to test Cotto's power.

=== Rounds 9–12 ===
After a one-sided ninth round in favor of Pacquiao, wherein Cotto received significant punishment, many people thought that Cotto's corner should have stopped the fight. At this point, Cotto's wife even left the arena. However, a bloodied up Cotto decided to continue the fight, but he could not evade Pacquiao's onslaught, prompting the referee to stop the fight fifty-five seconds into the twelfth round. Pacquiao was ahead on all three judges' scorecards before the stoppage, which read 109–99, 108–99, and 108–100, all in favor of Pacquiao.

=== Punch stats ===
- Total punches: Pacquiao landed 336 out of 780 (43%), whereas Cotto landed 172 out of 597 (29%).
- Total jabs: Pacquiao landed 60 out of 220 (27%), whereas Cotto landed 79 out of 297 (27%).
- Total power punches: Pacquiao landed 276 out of 560 (49%), whereas Cotto landed 93 out of 300(31%).

== Aftermath ==
With this victory, Pacquiao took the WBO world welterweight title (his seventh world championship), to become the first boxer in history to win seven world titles in seven different weight divisions. Pacquiao also won the special WBC Diamond Belt. After the fight, promoter Bob Arum stated: "Pacquiao is the greatest boxer I've ever seen, and I've seen them all, including Ali, Hagler and Sugar Ray Leonard." Meanwhile, Cotto was taken to a hospital as a precaution.

The fight generated 1.25 million buys and 70 million dollars in domestic pay-per-view revenue, making it the most watched boxing event of 2009. Pacquiao earned around 22 million dollars for his part in the fight, whilst Cotto earned around 12 million dollars. Pacquiao–Cotto also generated a live gate of $8,847,550 from an official crowd of 15,930.

Pacquiao's victory sparked a media frenzy, concerning his latest achievement against Cotto, and a potential match-up with Floyd Mayweather Jr.

His stoppage win against Cotto was his 38th knockout and was the last bout for Pacquiao to score a knockout until eight years later in July 2018, when he stopped Lucas Matthysse in the 7th.

== Undercard ==
Confirmed bouts:

=== Televised ===
- Middleweight bout: (Mexico) Julio Cesar Chavez Jr. vs. (United States) Troy Rowland

Chavez Jr. defeated Rowland via unanimous decision (97–93, 98–92, 99–91).

- WBA Super Welterweight Championship bout: (Israel) Yuri Foreman vs. (Puerto Rico) Daniel Santos

Foreman defeated Santos via unanimous decision (117–109, 117–109, 116–110) to win the WBA world super welterweight title.

- Welterweight bout: (Mexico) Alfonso Gomez vs. (Mexico) Jesus Soto Karass

Gomez defeated Soto Karass via technical decision (58–54, 57–55, 57–55) to win the vacant WBC Continental Americas welterweight title. The fight was stopped at 2:41 of round six, due to a cut on Gomez caused by an accidental headbutt.

=== Untelevised ===
- Super Welterweight bout: (Mexico) Rodrigo García vs. (United States) Martin Vierra

Vierra defeated Garcia via unanimous decision (40–36, 40–36, 40–36).

- Bantamweight bout: (Philippines) Eden Sonsona vs. (Israel) Eilon Kedem

Sonsona defeated Kedem via technical knockout in the second round.

- Middleweight bout: (Russia) Matt Korobov vs. (United States) James Winchester

Korobov defeated Winchester via unanimous decision (60–54, 60–54, 60–54).

- Flyweight bout: (Philippines) Richie Mepranum vs. (United States) Ernie Marquez

Mepranum defeated Marquez via split decision (56–57, 57–56, 58–55).

- Lightweight bout: (Puerto Rico) Abner Cotto vs. (United States) Guadalupe Guzman

Cotto defeated Guzman via unanimous decision (60–54, 60–54, 59–55).

== Broadcasting ==
| Country | Broadcaster |
|---|---|
| Australia | Main Event |
| Canada | Viewers Choice |
| Hungary | Sport 1 |
| Poland | Polsat Sport |
| Philippines | Solar Sports (Pay, live) |
| Philippines | GMA Network and C/S 9 (Terrestrial, delayed) |
| United Kingdom | Sky Sports |
| United States | HBO |

| Preceded by vs. Joshua Clottey | Miguel Cotto's bouts November 14, 2009 | Succeeded by vs. Yuri Foreman |
| Preceded by vs. Ricky Hatton | Manny Pacquiao's bouts November 14, 2009 | Succeeded by vs. Joshua Clottey |
