= Miguel Cotto vs. Ricardo Mayorga =

Boxing match

Relentless
- Date: March 12, 2011
- Venue: MGM Grand Garden Arena, Paradise, Nevada, U.S.
- Title(s) on the line: WBA (Super) light middleweight and inaugural WBB light middleweight titles

Tale of the tape
Boxer	Miguel Cotto	Ricardo Mayorga
Nickname	"Junito"	"El Matador"
Hometown	Caguas, Puerto Rico	Managua, Nicaragua
Purse	$1,000,000	$50,000
Pre-fight record	35–2 (28 KO)	29–7–1 (23 KO)
Age	30 years, 4 months	37 years, 5 months
Height	5 ft 7 in (170 cm)	5 ft 9 in (175 cm)
Weight	154 lb (70 kg)	154 lb (70 kg)
Style	Orthodox	Orthodox
Recognition	WBA (Super); Light Middleweight champion The Ring; No. 3 Ranked Light Middleweight; 3-division world champion	WBA; No. 6 Ranked Super Welterweight; 2-division world champion

Result
- Cotto via 12th round TKO

Miguel Cotto vs. Ricardo Mayorga, billed as Relentless, was a boxing light middleweight fight for the WBA (Super) light middleweight championship. The bout was held on March 12, 2011, at MGM Grand Garden Arena, in Las Vegas, Nevada, United States. Cotto won the fight via technical knockout in the twelfth round.

Cotto, a three-division world champion, won his 154-pound belt by stopping Yuri Foreman in the ninth round at Yankee Stadium in June 2010. Following the bout, the Puerto Rican pugilist underwent shoulder surgery and took the rest of 2010 off. On the other hand, Mayorga is coming from a ninth round KO win against Michael Walker in December 2010; this was the first time he fought in 27 months, after being knocked out by Shane Mosley in the twelfth round of their September 2008 match.

== Background ==
=== Miguel Cotto ===
After the Manny Pacquiao fight, Cotto moved to the light middleweight division. On June 5, 2010, he fought against Israeli undefeated boxer Yuri Foreman at Yankee Stadium in New York City.

Cotto ended up knocking Foreman down with a signature left hook to the body in the ninth round claiming the WBA light middleweight title, his fourth overall in three different weight divisions.

=== Ricardo Mayorga ===
Following the bout with Shane Mosley, Mayorga took a period of inactivity. He was scheduled to fight undefeated junior-middleweight prospect Alfredo Angulo on February 14, 2009 on the undercard of Nate Campbell's title defense against Ali Funeka. Mayorga withdrew from the fight, citing injuries to his ribs from the Shane Mosley fight made training very difficult and therefore was unable to make weight. He stated money was not the issue. However, his promoter, Don King, stated that Mayorga pulled out ten days before the bout after his demands for a higher purse were not met.

On December 17, 2010, the Nicaraguan boxer fought Michael Walker and defeated him by TKO in the ninth round, ending a 27 months layoff.

== The fight ==
Throughout the fight, Mayorga looked to engage, however the discipline on Cotto played a big part in the win, saving his big shots for the final round. A left hook landed, which dropped Mayorga and ended the bout. At the time of stoppage, Cotto was ahead by five points on all three judges' scorecards. Compubox stats showed that Cotto out punched Mayorga 249 to 176 in total punches.

== Aftermath ==
In the post-fight, Cotto explained how he won the fight, "The game plan was not to get caught up in any of his antics. He was very heavy handed, I felt his punches the whole fight." He also mentioned how before the last round, his trainer Emanuel Steward told him he would be able to stop Mayorga in the last round, which was the conclusion of the fight.

== Undercard ==
Confirmed bouts:

=== Televised ===
- Light Middleweight bout: (Poland) Pawel Wolak vs. (Israel) Yuri Foreman

Wolak defeated Foreman via technical knockout. The fight was stopped at the end of round six.

- Lightweight bout: (Mexico) Miguel Vazquez vs. (Australia) Leonardo Zappavigna

Vazquez defeated Zappavigna via unanimous decision (117-111, 118-110, 118-110)

- Heavyweight bout: (United States) Tommy Zbikowski vs. (United States) Richard Bryant

Zbikowski defeated Bryant via technical knockout. The fight was stopped at 1:45 of round one.

=== Preliminary card ===
- Heavyweight bout: (United States) Éric Molina vs. (United States) Joseph Rabotte

Molina defeats Rabotte via technical knockout. The fight was stopped at 1:38 of the sixth round.

- Middleweight bout: (Russia) Matvey Korobov vs. (United States) Michael Walker

Korobov defeats Walker via technical knockout. The fight was stopped at 1:31 of the first round.

- Lightweight bout: (Puerto Rico) Juan Gonzalez vs. (United States) Jeremy McLaurin

Gonzalez defeats McLaurin via technical knockout. The fight was stopped at 1:56 of the first round.

- Super Bantamweight bout: (Puerto Rico) Jesus M. Rojas vs. (United States) Isaac Hidalgo

Rojas defeated Hidalgo via unanimous decision (59–55, 58–56, 59–55).

== Broadcasting ==
Country	Broadcaster
Australia	Main Event
Hungary	Sport 2
Mexico	TV Azteca
Poland	Polsat Sport
United States	Showtime

Preceded by vs. Yuri Foreman	Miguel Cotto's bouts 12 March 2011	Succeeded by vs. Antonio Margarito II
Preceded by vs. Michael Walker	Ricardo Mayorga's bouts 12 March 2011	Succeeded by vs. Allen Medina
