= Sergio Martínez vs. Miguel Cotto =

Boxing match

- Date: June 7, 2014
- Venue: Madison Square Garden, New York City, New York, U.S.
- Title(s) on the line: WBC, The Ring and TBRB middleweight championship

Tale of the tape
Boxer	Sergio Martínez	Miguel Cotto
Nickname	Maravilla	Junito
Hometown	Quilmes, Buenos Aires, Argentina	Caguas, Puerto Rico
Purse	$1,500,000	$7,000,000
Pre-fight record	51–2–2 (28 KO)	38–4 (31 KO)
Age	39 years, 3 months	33 years, 7 months
Height	5 ft 10 in (178 cm)	5 ft 7 in (170 cm)
Weight	158 3/4 lb (72 kg)	155 lb (70 kg)
Style	Orthodox	Orthodox
Recognition	WBC, The Ring and TBRB; Middleweight Champion; The Ring No. 7 ranked pound-for-pound fighter 2-division world champion	WBC; No. 1 Ranked Middleweight; The Ring; No. 3 Ranked Light middleweight TBRB; No. 5 Ranked Light middleweight 2-division world champion

Result
- Cotto defeats Martínez by 10th round retirement

Sergio Martínez vs. Miguel Cotto was a professional boxing match contested on June 7, 2014, for the WBC, The Ring and TBRB middleweight championship.

== Background ==
After making his 6th defence of the middleweight title against Martin Murray in April 2013, Martínez had inactive for more than a year and had two separate surgeries performed on his right knee.

In February 2014, it was announced that former 2 division champion Miguel Cotto would move up to middleweight in order to challenge him for the titles on June 7, 2014, at Madison Square Garden. A catchweight of 159 pounds was set for this bout.

Cotto was a 9/5 favourite to win.

== The fight ==
In front of 21,090 at the Garden, Cotto would knock Martínez down 3 times in the first round, with Martinez's legs having knee braces on and clearly visible. After the first round however, the champion began to make the fight more competitive with Cotto. He continued to fight back until round nine when Martínez went down once again. Following the ninth round, trainer Pablo Sarmiento decided to call off the fight prior to the tenth round while still in the corner, against the urging of Martínez. According to reports, Sarmiento told Martínez "Champion, your knees are not responding. Sergio, look at me ... I'm gonna stop this one. Sergio, you are the best for me. You'll always be the best champion, Sergio." Throughout the fight, journalists and fans alike, noticed Martínez was unable to bend, flex and support his own weight while moving in the ring. Martínez himself proclaimed that his knee had nothing to do with the outcome of the fight and his struggles were a result of a body shot.

At the time of stoppage, all three judges had the fight 90–77 for Cotto. According to CompuBox Stats, Cotto landed 212 if 395 punches thrown and Martinez landed 100 of his 322 thrown.

== Aftermath ==
Highlights were shown on regular HBO a week later and averaged 970,000, peaking at 1.126 million. The fight generated $20 million from 350,000 buys on HBO PPV. This was considered a disappointment as HBO projected the fight would do around a 500,000 buyrate. Bob Arum, Cotto's promoter stated the reason for a downfall in PPV buys was simply because there was too many of them. Martinez's promoter Lou DiBella added that there was a lot events that same weekend, which would have impact on the boxing event. The promotion did however make a profit due to the $4.7 million live gate.

Following the bout, Martínez stated that he wanted to continue his boxing career, and expressed his desire to fight against Manny Pacquiao and Floyd Mayweather Jr. However, on 13 June 2015, Martínez announced his retirement from boxing at the age of 40, stating that both aging and knee injuries were the causes for his decision.

== Undercard ==
Confirmed bouts:

== Broadcasting ==
Country	Broadcaster
Australia	Main Event
Hungary	Sport 1
New Zealand	Sky Arena
Panama	RPC
United Kingdom	BoxNation
United States	HBO

Preceded by vs. Martin Murray	Sergio Martínez's bouts 7 June 2014	Succeeded by vs. Jose Miguel Fandiño
Preceded by vs. Delvin Rodríguez	Miguel Cotto's bouts 7 June 2014	Succeeded by vs. Daniel Geale
