= Miguel Cotto vs. Daniel Geale =

Boxing match

- Date: June 6, 2015
- Venue: Barclays Center, Brooklyn, New York, U.S.
- Title(s) on the line: WBC and The Ring middleweight titles

Tale of the tape
Boxer	Miguel Cotto	Daniel Geale
Nickname	Junito	Real Deal
Hometown	Caguas, Puerto Rico	Mount Annan, New South Wales, Australia
Pre-fight record	39–4 (32 KO)	31–3 (16 KO)
Age	34 years, 7 months	34 years, 3 months
Height	5 ft 8 in (173 cm)	5 ft 10 in (178 cm)
Weight	153.6 lb (70 kg)	157 lb (71 kg)
Style	Orthodox	Orthodox
Recognition	WBC and The Ring; Middleweight Champion; 4-division world champion	WBC; No. 6 Ranked Middleweight; The Ring; No. 4 Ranked Middleweight; Former Unified WBA and IBF Middleweight Champion

Result
- Cotto wins via 4th–round technical knockout

Miguel Cotto vs. Daniel Geale was a professional boxing match contested on June 6, 2015, for the WBC and The Ring middleweight titles.

== Background ==
Miguel Cotto, after having defeated Sergio Martínez in June 2014 to capture the WBC middleweight title, began negotiations with Canelo Álvarez with the long-awaited and much-hyped fight tentatively scheduled for May 2, 2015, which Álvarez preferred due to it taking place on the weekend prior to Cinco de Mayo. However, Golden Boy Promotions head Oscar De La Hoya, who promoted Álvarez admitted that the talks between both fighters had been difficult as Cotto preferred to have the fight in June, around the time of Puerto Rican Day Parade. In the meantime, Cotto was originally scheduled to return to the ring in December 2014 at Madison Square Garden, but Cotto opted to sit out the remainder of 2014 as his trainer Freddie Roach would be preoccupied with training Manny Pacquiao for his November fight with Chris Algieri. In January 2014, after months of negotiations, it was announced that talks for the Cotto–Álvarez fight had ceased and both fighters would pursue other opponents for the time being.

In April, it was announced that Cotto end his year-long hiatus and return to the ring to face former WBA and IBF middleweight champion Daniel Geale on June 6 at the Barclays Center. The bout was viewed as a tune-up for Cotto prior to facing Álvarez, who himself was facing James Kirkland in May, later in the year. Cotto insisted on the fight having a catchweight of 157 pounds, three pounds under the middleweight division. Geale, fearing he would have difficulty making the weight, initially refused Cotto's demand for a catchweight, but after Cotto threatened to withdraw from the bout, Geale relented. At the weigh-in the day before the fight, Geale managed to just make weight, coming in at 157 pounds even.

Cotto was the regaining TBRB champion with Geale ranked 7th.

== Fight Details ==
Cotto would dominate Geale through 3+ rounds, landing over double the amount of punches and appeared to be far quicker than Geale, who landed nothing substantial during the duration of the bout. Just before the end of round three, Cotto stunned Geale with a right hand that sent him staggering into the ropes. 30 seconds into round four, Cotto sent Geale down on his back with a left hook. Geale would get to his knees before answering the referee's count at nine and continuing the fight. Cotto would continue his assault before dropping Geale with a short right hand. Geale would beat the referee's 10-count but shook his head when asked if he wanted to continue, thus giving Cotto the victory be technical knockout at 1:28 of the fourth round.

== Fight card ==
Confirmed bouts:

Weight Class	Weight		vs.		Method	Round	Time	Notes
Catchweight	157 lbs.	Miguel Cotto	def.	Daniel Geale	TKO	4/12	1:28	^{note 1}
Featherweight	126 lbs.	Fernando Vargas Parra	def.	Wilfredo Vázquez Jr.	UD	8
Featherweight	126 lbs.	Angel Luna	def.	Jose Lopez	UD	6
Light Heavyweight	175 lbs.	Junior Younan	def.	Mike Sawyer	TKO	2/6	2:29
Heavyweight	200+ lbs.	Zhilei Zhang	def.	Glenn Thomas	UD	4
Welterweight	147 lbs.	Dustin Fleischer	def.	Kareem Millner	TKO	1/4	1:06
Super Bantamweight	122 lbs.	Shawn Simpson	def.	Damon Simon	TKO	4/4	2:05

^Note 1 For WBC and The Ring middleweight titles

== Broadcasting ==
Country	Broadcaster
Australia	Main Event
Hungary	Sport 1
Latin America	Space
United Kingdom	BoxNation
United States	HBO

Preceded by vs. Sergio Martínez	Miguel Cotto's bouts 6 June 2015	Succeeded by vs. Canelo Álvarez
Preceded by vs. Jarrod Fletcher	Daniel Geale's bouts 6 June 2015	Succeeded by vs. Renold Quinlan
