= Pedro Diaz (boxing) =

Cuban and American boxing trainer

Pedro Díaz
- Born: November 26, 1962 (age 63); Santa Clara, Cuba
- Education: Ph.D. in Pedagogical Sciences
- Occupation: Boxing trainer
- Years active: 1990s–present
- Employer: Mundo Boxing
- Known for: Scientific training methodology

Pedro Díaz (born November 26, 1962) is a Cuban-American boxing trainer and educator based in Miami, Florida. He is the founder of Mundo Boxing, a training organization for professional boxers and mixed martial artists.

Known for his scientific approach to combat sports, Díaz holds a Ph.D. in Pedagogical Sciences and specializes in the periodization of sports training. He gained international prominence as a coach for the Cuban National Team and the Dominican Republic Olympic team before transitioning to professional boxing, where he has trained world champions including Miguel Cotto, Guillermo Rigondeaux, Félix Díaz, and Imane Khelif.

== Biography and education ==
Díaz began his career in the amateur boxing system in Cuba, training under the renowned coach Alcides Sagarra. He attended the Cuban Sports University specializing in boxing, and in 1999 he earned the title of Doctor in Pedagogical Sciences. His coaching style is often noted for integrating biomechanics and strict tactical discipline into fighter preparation.

== Coaching career ==
=== Olympic success ===
Díaz served as a prominent coach within the Cuban amateur system during four Olympic Games (1992, 1996, 2000, and 2004), contributing to the development of numerous medalists. He later became the head coach for the Dominican Republic's Olympic boxing team. Under his guidance at the 2008 Summer Olympics in Beijing, Félix Díaz won the gold medal, a historic achievement for the nation.

=== Professional boxing ===
Díaz gained widespread recognition in professional boxing when he was hired by Puerto Rican champion Miguel Cotto. Díaz played a central role in Cotto's camp for his victory against Antonio Margarito in their 2011 rematch and led Cotto's corner for the bout against Floyd Mayweather Jr. in 2012. Media outlets noted that Díaz brought Cotto "back to basics," emphasizing defense and tactical structure.

Díaz also served as the head trainer for fellow Cuban Guillermo Rigondeaux during several key title defenses, including Rigondeaux's signature unification victory against Nonito Donaire in 2013.

=== Mixed Martial Arts ===
In 2013, Díaz expanded his methodology to MMA by joining the Blackzilians camp as a striking coach. He worked with legends such as Vitor Belfort for his trilogy fight against Dan Henderson, bringing professional boxing mechanics to MMA striking.

=== Recent years (2020–present) ===
Díaz continues to operate out of Miami, training a stable of athletes that has included Ivan Baranchyk, Roamer Alexis Angulo, and Xu Can.

- Imane Khelif: In 2024, Díaz was part of the coaching team for Algerian boxer Imane Khelif during the Paris Olympics, supporting her during her gold medal run.
- Tim Tszyu: In late 2025, Australian former world champion Tim Tszyu appointed Díaz as his new head coach to lead his career rebuilding phase, citing Díaz's veteran experience.

== Notable corners ==
Díaz has worked the corner for numerous high-profile bouts. Key victories and strategic performances under his tutelage include:

Boxing

1. Miguel Cotto vs. Antonio Margarito II
2. Guillermo Rigondeaux vs. Nonito Donaire
3. Miguel Cotto vs. Floyd Mayweather Jr.
4. Hassan N'Dam vs. Ryota Murata – A strategic bout for the WBA Middleweight title.
5. Ivan Baranchyk vs. Anthony Yigit – A victory leading to the IBF Junior Welterweight title.

MMA

1. Vitor Belfort vs. Dan Henderson III
