= Miguel Cotto vs. Delvin Rodríguez =

Boxing match

Reloaded
- Date: October 5, 2013
- Venue: Amway Center, Orlando, Florida, U.S.

Tale of the tape
Boxer	Miguel Cotto	Delvin Rodríguez
Nickname	Junito	The Jaguar
Hometown	Caguas, Puerto Rico	Santiago de los Caballeros, Dominican Republic
Purse	$2,000,000	$250,000
Pre-fight record	37–4 (30 KO)	28–6–3 (16 KO)
Age	32 years, 11 months	33 years, 5 months
Height	5 ft 8 1/2 in (174 cm)	5 ft 11 in (180 cm)
Weight	153 1/4 lb (70 kg)	154 lb (70 kg)
Style	Orthodox	Orthodox
Recognition	WBC; No. 2 Ranked Light Middleweight; WBA; No. 3 Ranked Light Middleweight; WBO; No. 7 Ranked Light Middleweight; The Ring; No. 4 Ranked Light Middleweight; 3-division world champion	WBA; No. 4 Ranked Light Middleweight; WBO; No. 9 Ranked Light Middleweight; IBF; No. 10 Ranked Light Middleweight; WBC; No. 11 Ranked Light Middleweight

Result
- Cotto wins via third–round technical knockout

Miguel Cotto vs. Delvin Rodríguez, billed as Reloaded, was a professional boxing match contested on October 5, 2013.

== Background ==
Miguel Cotto had lost both of his fights in 2012, first losing to top ranked pound-for-pound fighter Floyd Mayweather Jr. in May and then being upset by the relatively unknown WBA super welterweight champion Austin Trout in December. When asked if he would continue his career after his lopsided loss to Trout, Cotto was optimistic that he would fight again stating "I'm not finished yet. I still have boxing in my mind. I just want to rest with my family the rest of the year. I never make excuses. I accept my defeats and I learn from them and I just move forward." Months would go by before it was announced by Cotto's advisor Bryan Perez that Cotto would return to the ring at an unspecified date in 2013, telling ESPN that "we're working on some different options, and in the next couple weeks there will be an official announcement." A match between Cotto and former IBF super welterweight champion Cornelius Bundrage was discussed for September but ultimately fell through. Then in July, it was announced that Cotto would finally return in October to face Delvin Rodríguez. Promoter Bob Arum considered staging the fight at the almost 40,000 seat Marlins Park in Miami but ultimately settled for the smaller Amway Center in Orlando.

Cotto was ranked as the 5th best Light middleweight by TBRB with Rodríguez unranked.

== Fight details ==
Cotto dominated the fight from the opening bell, attacking Rodríguez's body with left hooks of which he landed 10 in the first round. Cotto continued to overwhelm Rodríguez, who landed just 16 punches, in the second round, staggering him at the end of the round with a left hook. Just seconds into the third round, Cotto backed Rodríguez into the ropes landed a big left hook to the head and followed with a left-right combination that sent Rodríguez, after which referee Frank Santore Jr. immediately stopped the fight, giving Cotto the victory via technical knockout just 18 seconds into the round.

== Fight card ==
Confirmed bouts:

Weight Class	Weight		vs.		Method	Round
Super Welterweight	154 lbs.	Miguel Cotto	def.	Delvin Rodríguez	TKO	3/12
Lightweight	135 lbs.	Terence Crawford	def.	Andrey Klimov	UD	10
Featherweight	126 lbs.	Jayson Vélez	def.	Dat Nguyen	UD	10
Super Welterweight	154 lbs.	Jorge Melendez	def.	Jamaal Davis	TKO	2/10
Lightweight	135 lbs.	Félix Verdejo	def.	Gary Eyer	TKO	2/6
Super Middleweight	168 lbs.	Moises Carrasquillo Jr	def.	Steven Chadwick	UD	4

== Broadcasting ==
Country	Broadcaster
Australia	Main Event
Hungary	Sport 2
United States	HBO

Preceded by vs. Austin Trout	Miguel Cotto's bouts 5 October 2013	Succeeded by vs. Sergio Martínez
Preceded by vs. Freddy Hernández	Delvin Rodríguez's bouts 5 October 2013	Succeeded by vs. Joachim Alcine
