= Miguel Cotto vs. Antonio Margarito II =

Boxing match

The Battle 2
- Date: December 3, 2011
- Venue: Madison Square Garden, New York City, New York, U.S.
- Title(s) on the line: WBA (Super) super welterweight title

Tale of the tape
Boxer	(Puerto Rico) Miguel Cotto	(Mexico) Antonio Margarito
Nickname	"Junito"	"Tony"
Hometown	Caguas, Puerto Rico	Tijuana, Baja California, Mexico
Purse	$5,000,000	$2,500,000
Pre-fight record	36–2 (29 KO)	38–7–1 (27 KO)
Age	31 years, 1 month	33 years, 8 months
Height	5 ft 7 in (170 cm)	5 ft 11 in (180 cm)
Weight	152 1/4 lb (69 kg)	152 1/2 lb (69 kg)
Style	Orthodox	Orthodox
Recognition	WBA (Super); Super Welterweight Champion; The Ring; No. 1 Ranked Light Middleweight; 3-division world champion	WBA; No. 3 Ranked Super Welterweight; 3-time welterweight champion

Result
- Cotto wins via 9th-round TKO

Miguel Cotto vs. Antonio Margarito II was a professional boxing match contested on December 3, 2011, for the WBA (Super) super welterweight championship. The bout was at Madison Square Garden, in New York City, United States under the promotion of Top Rank at a catchweight of 153 pounds.

Cotto defeated Antonio Margarito via TKO in the 9th round.

== Background ==
=== Cotto ===
External audio
- You may watch Miguel Cotto vs various fighters here

After uniting with famed trainer, Emmanuel Steward, Cotto became Light Middleweight champion when he defeated Yuri Foreman, in a very bizarre way, at the Yankee Stadium on June 5, 2010. In round 7, Foreman slipped and badly injured his knee. He somehow found a way to finish and survive the round and would continue fighting into round 8. With his corner growing even more concerned as time passed and the punishment on their fighter mounted, they threw in the towel stopping the fight in round 8. Arthur Mercante, Jr., the referee, cleared the ring and restarted the fight. Foreman would eventually succumb to the pressure of Miguel in the following round after the fight restarted. He made one defense of his world title on March 12, 2011, against Ricardo Mayorga, with a technical knockout in the 12th round, at the MGM Grand Arena in Las Vegas. He was ahead by five points on all three ringside scorecards entering the final round. He then unleashed a vicious left hook that sent the wild-swinging Nicaraguan to the canvas. Although Mayorga got up, he told referee Robert Byrd when the fight resumed that he couldn't go on. He said it wasn't the effect of the left hook that made him quit, but an injury to his thumb during the exchange.

=== Margarito ===
External audio
- You may watch Antonio Margarito vs various fighters here

Margarito made a ring return against Roberto García on May 8, 2010, in Aguascalientes, Mexico after his suspension from boxing. He wasn't able to renew his license in California so the fight was made Mexico. He also parted ways with old trainer Javier Capetillo and began training with Robert Garcia. He fought Manny Pacquiao for a vacant Light Middleweight title suffering a one-sided decision loss before a delighted crowd of 41,734 at Cowboys Stadium in Arlington, Texas. Pacquiao cemented his claim to being the best boxer in the world by dominating the bigger but slower Margarito almost from the opening bell. Pacquiao –who gave away 4+1/2in in height and was at a six-inch reach disadvantage – won round after round, opening a cut on Margarito's cheek and closing his right eye. He had his orbital bone broken and also developed a large cataract in the right eye as a result of Pacquiao's repeated blows. His orbital bone was repaired and there were no complications. It took a couple months before Margarito was able to get back to training, thus having to reschedule twice for a second bout with Cotto. Margarito was originally told he could continue to box only as long as he didn't have cataract surgery, but that the blurry vision in his right eye would not improve. But they did this different kind of surgery that day, a half-hour surgery. They removed the cataract and put in a new lens. His vision, while improved from conditions during the fight, has been seriously degraded and will likely result in vision problems for the rest of his life.

=== Location Controversy ===
New York State Athletic Commission (NYSAC) initially denied Margarito a boxing license on October 31, 2011. The rationale for the denial was not due to the cheating allegations, but instead due to the damage to Margarito's eye in the Manny Pacquiao fight. An appeal was filed and a hearing took place to where several leading eye doctors testified that Margarito should be allowed to fight. A final decision was expected on November 18, 2011. Without a license, Margarito could not fight in the state of New York.

Several major figures received criticism for their actions surrounding this fight. NYSAC chairwoman Melvina Lathan was in attendance when the fight was announced, potentially indicating that the NYSAC supported the fight. In addition, Bob Arum and Top Rank did not give an indication that the fight may not occur at Madison Square Garden when promoting the fight, causing fans to nearly sellout Madison Square Garden with 2 weeks remaining before the fight as well as spend money on flights, hotels, etc. Plus, there was criticism that the license issue was not to be resolved until 2 weeks before the fight.

Arum initially stated that if Margarito was not licensed to fight, then Vanes Martirosyan would take his place on the card. However, Arum later stated that the fight would be moved to a venue in a state that Margarito holds a license.

On November 18, 2011, the NYSAC did not make a final vote as expected. Instead, they ordered Margarito to be examined by their own doctor. Based on the findings of their own doctor, they would make a decision on whether Margarito received a license.

The New York State Athletic Commission granted Antonio Margarito a license to box in New York after a hearing in Manhattan. They listened to a recommendation from Dr. Michael Goldstein, who examined Margarito's eye. Goldstein told the commission that the eye was fine and that Margarito was fit to box.

The NYSAC said the decision would stand on its own and they would offer no statements of explanation or clarification.

=== Build up ===
As part of the buildup for the fight, HBO's "24/7" show produced an unprecedented three-part prelude. The series, titled Cotto-Margarito 24/7, aired installments on the final two Saturdays of November. Immediately following the back-to-back replay of both episodes of 24/7 COTTO/MARGARITO on Friday, Dec 2 at 8:00 p.m., the half-hour special "24/7 Overtime: Cotto/Margarito" will be seen at 9:00 p.m.

The series focuses on each fighter's training and preparation for the bout.

HBO aired a brief interview, confrontational-styled show entitled, "Face Off" with Max Kellerman hosting and leading the conversation. Cotto brandishes pictures of Margarito's hand wraps after the fight. Margarito's left hand wrap appears to have a mark which Cotto claims is a break in the wrap.

During one installment of Cotto/Margarito 24/7, Margarito continuously professes his innocence in both cases. Margarito, as well as former trainer Capetillo, both claim to have no knowledge of the illegal substance discovered prior to the Mosley bout.

Margarito has stated that Cotto is just making excuses, with Capetillo arguing Cotto is just trying to sell the fight.

The fight was televised on HBO Pay-Per-View, with the cost to watch the fight at $55 in the U.S.

The 17,943rd and final ticket was sold on Thursday, December 1, 2011. It produced a sellout gate in excess of $3 million for the Pay Per View-televised rematch.

== The fight ==
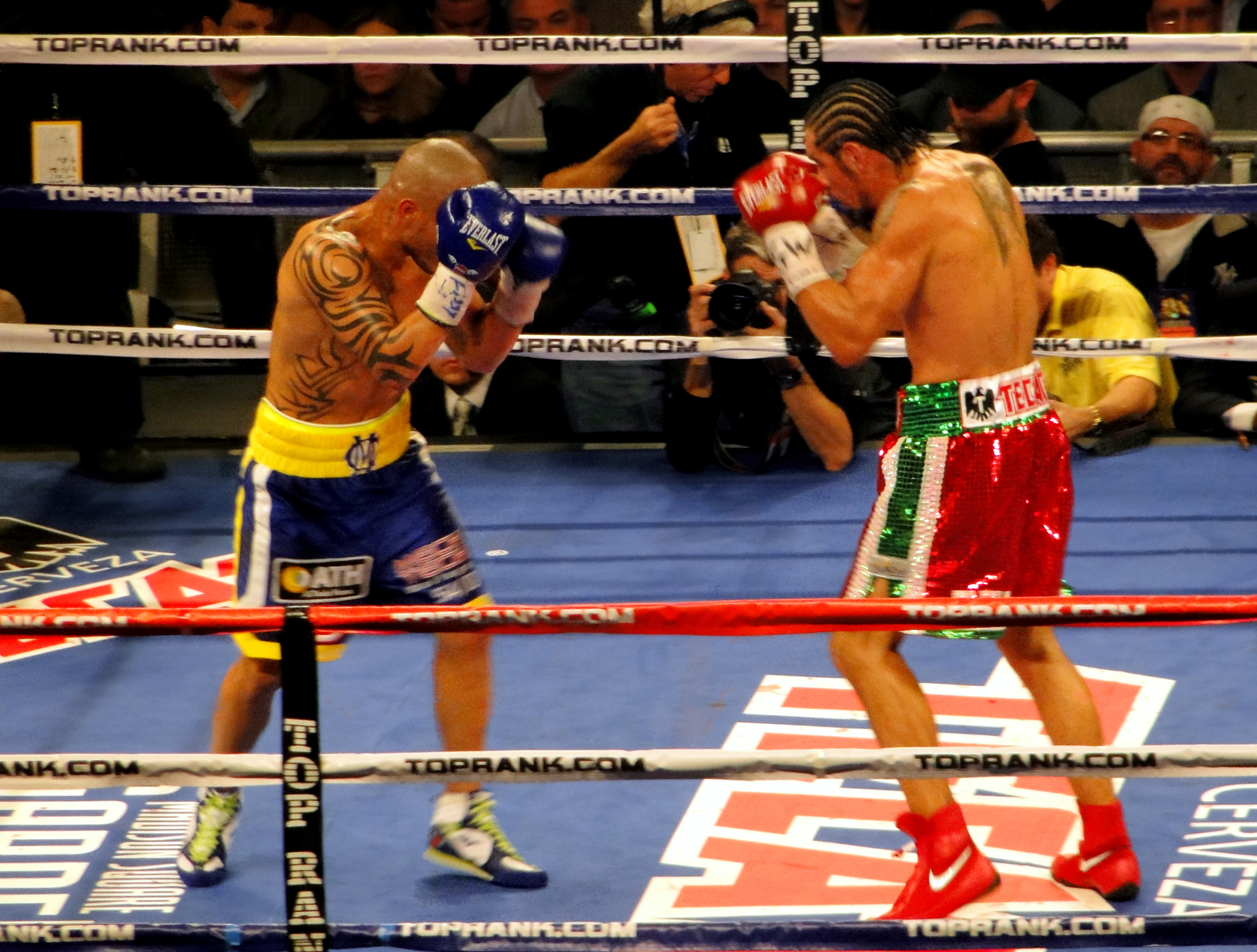
Cotto (left) and Margarito (right)

Cotto controlled the fight from the outset, landing at a high connect percentage and parrying and dodging the majority of Margarito's shots. Margarito's right eye began to swell after suffering a swift left jab by Cotto in round 4. In rounds 5 and 6, Margarito managed to land several uppercuts but they were not enough to stop Cotto. Doctors finally stopped the fight before the 10th round because of the worsening condition of Margarito's eye, awarding Cotto a 9th-round TKO victory.

== Aftermath ==
Margarito retired following this fight, but would make a comeback in 2016.

== Main Card ==
Confirmed bouts:

- Super Welterweight Championship bout: (Puerto Rico) Miguel Cotto (c) vs. (Mexico) Antonio Margarito
  - Cotto defeats Margarito via TKO at 3:00 of Round 9
- Lightweight Championship bout: (United States) Brandon Rios (c) vs. (England) John Murray
  - Rios defeats Murray via TKO at 2:06 of Round 11
- Light Middleweight bout: (Poland) Pawel Wolak vs. (Dominican Republic) Delvin Rodriguez
  - Rodriguez defeats Wolak via Unanimous Decision. (98-91, 98–92, 100-90)
- Welterweight bout: (United States) Mike Jones vs. (Argentina) Sebastian Andres Lujan
  - Jones defeats Lujan via Unanimous Decision. (118-110, 119–109, 119-109)

=== Preliminary card ===
- Light Heavyweight bout: (United States) Mike Lee vs. (United States) Allen Medina
  - Lee defeats Medina via Technical Knockout at 0:55 of the fourth round.
- Light Heavyweight bout: (Republic of Ireland) Sean Monaghan vs. (Puerto Rico) Santos Martinez
  - Monaghan defeats Martinez via Knockout at 2:56 of the second round.
- Light Middleweight bout: (United States) Glen Tapia vs. (Puerto Rico) Mike Ruiz
  - Tapia defeats Ruiz via Knockout at 2:27 of the second round.
- Bantamweight bout: (Mexico) Hanzel Martinez vs. (Mexico) Felipe Castaneda
  - Martinez defeats Castaneda via Majority Decision. (39-37, 39–37, 38-38)
- Welterweight bout: (Puerto Rico) Samuel Figueroa vs. (United States) Latwon Halsey
  - Figueroa defeats Halsey via Split Decision. (38-37, 37–38, 39-36)
- Featherweight bout: (Puerto Rico) Braulio Santos vs. (United States) Tommy Garcia

== International Broadcasting ==
Country	Broadcaster
Australia	Main Event
Belgium	Be Sport 1
Czech Republic	Sport 1
Denmark	TV 2 Sport
Estonia	Viasat Sport Baltic
France	Orange Sport
Hungary	Sport 2
Indonesia	RCTI
Italy	Sportitalia
Japan	WOWOW
Latvia	Viasat Sport Baltic
Lithuania	Viasat Sport Baltic
Malaysia	Astro Box Office
Mexico	TV Azteca
New Zealand	Sky Arena
Norway	Viasat Sport
Philippines	ABS-CBN; Studio 23 (terrestrial, delayed)
Poland	Polsat Sport
Qatar	Al Jazeera Sports
Romania	Digi Sport
Russia	NTV Plus
Slovakia	Sport 1
South Africa	SuperSport
Spain	MARCA TV
Sweden	TV10
Thailand	Channel 7
United Kingdom	BoxNation
United States	HBO PPV
United States	US Military via AFN Sports

== See also ==
- Mexico – Puerto Rico boxing rivalry
- Miguel Cotto vs. Antonio Margarito 1st Meeting
- Face Off with Max Kellerman

Preceded by vs. Ricardo Mayorga	Miguel Cotto's bouts 3 December 2011	Succeeded by vs. Floyd Mayweather Jr.
Preceded by vs. Manny Pacquiao	Antonio Margarito's bouts 3 December 2011	Succeeded by vs. Jorge Páez, Jr.
