= Floyd Mayweather Jr. vs. Miguel Cotto =

2012 professional boxing match

Ring Kings
- Date: May 5, 2012
- Venue: MGM Grand Garden Arena, Paradise, Nevada, U.S.
- Title(s) on the line: WBA (Super) super welterweight title

Tale of the tape
Boxer	Miguel Cotto	Floyd Mayweather Jr.
Nickname	Junito	Money
Hometown	Caguas, Puerto Rico	Grand Rapids, Michigan, U.S.
Purse	$8,000,000	$45,000,000
Pre-fight record	37–2 (30 KO)	42–0 (26 KO)
Age	31 years, 6 months	35 years, 2 months
Height	5 ft 8 in (173 cm)	5 ft 8 in (173 cm)
Weight	154 lb (70 kg)	151 lb (68 kg)
Style	Orthodox	Orthodox
Recognition	WBA (Super); Super Welterweight Champion; The Ring; No. 1 Ranked Light Middleweight; 3-division world champion	WBC; Welterweight Champion; The Ring; No. 2 Ranked Welterweight; The Ring No. 2 ranked pound-for-pound fighter 5-division world champion

Result
- Mayweather Jr. wins via 12-round unanimous decision (117-111, 117-111, 118-110)

Floyd Mayweather Jr. vs. Miguel Cotto, billed as Ring Kings, was a professional boxing match contested on May 5, 2012, for the WBA (Super) super welterweight championship. The bout was held at the MGM Grand Garden Arena in Las Vegas, Nevada, United States. Mayweather won the fight by unanimous decision in what was deemed to be a clear, but very competitive fight.

== Background ==
=== Mayweather ===
There was immediate speculation as to whom Mayweather would fight. Many felt that he should fight eight division champion, Manny Pacquiao. Indeed Mayweather called out Pacquiao via Twitter. Negotiations for the fight hit the wall, however, when there were arguments over the venue and how the money from the fight should be split.

Mayweather has had one previous fight in the 154-pound division, which was when he outpointed Oscar De La Hoya to win a belt in May 2007.

Mayweather reclaimed one of his old welterweight titles by knocking out Victor Ortiz controversially in the fourth round at the MGM Grand on Sept. 17, 2011.

=== Cotto ===
Making the third defense of his title, Cotto was in a fight without Top Rank as his promoter for the first time in his career. His contract with Bob Arum's company expired following his Dec. 3 revenge, 10th-round knockout victory against Antonio Margarito and he will be working with Golden Boy Promotions, Top Rank's archrival, on the fight with Mayweather.

=== Drug Testing ===
Both fighters agreed to random blood and urine testing for the fight, which Mayweather had demanded of his most recent opponents at the time.

== The fights ==
=== Álvarez vs. Mosley ===
Ring Kings: Canelo Álvarez vs. Shane Mosley
- Title(s) on the line: WBC super welterweight title

Tale of the tape
Boxer	(Mexico) Saúl Álvarez	(United States) Shane Mosley
Nickname	"Canelo"	"Sugar"
Hometown	Tlajomulco de Zúñiga, Jalisco, Mexico	Pomona, California, U.S.
Purse	$2,000,000	$750,000
Pre-fight record	39–0–1 (29 KO)	46–7–1 (1) (39 KO)
Age	21 years, 9 months	40 years, 7 months
Height	5 ft 8 in (173 cm)	5 ft 8 1/2 in (174 cm)
Weight	154 lb (70 kg)	154 lb (70 kg)
Style	Orthodox	Orthodox
Recognition	WBC; Super Welterweight Champion; The Ring; No. 2 Ranked Light Middleweight	WBC; No. 4 Ranked Super Welterweight; 3-division world champion

Result
- Álvarez defeats Mosley by unanimous decision

In the chief support WBC super welterweight champion Canelo Álvarez faced former 3 division world champion Shane Mosley.

When the fight was agreed in February, Álvarez said "This is the fight I was looking for. Shane Mosley is a tremendous fighter with a lot of experience and big victories in his storied career. Even though I have enormous respect and admiration for Mosley, because he is a great person outside of the ring, my goal is to defeat him with a great performance." Mosley would admit his recent performances had been lacking (having gone 0–2–1 in his last three bouts) saying "This is more of a fight to prove myself. I know I didn't look good in my last couple of fights and I really want to make a statement in this fight, I just want to get in the ring, fight a world champion and win another belt. I'm very excited and happy. It's another chance for me to show that I still belong. He's a young guy and it's a tough fight, but I'm excited to get the fight. A lot of guys want to be in the position I am in to have this type of fight."

=== The fight ===
Mosley would perform better than he had in his previous bouts but Alvarez was able to take advantage, landing numerous clean right hands and left hooks.

The fight lasted the full 12 rounds with Álvarez winning a one-sided unanimous decision with scores of 119–109, 119–109 and 118–110. ESPN scored the fight wide 118–110 for Álvarez. Álvarez landed more than half the punches he threw (348 of 673). According to CompuBox, it was the most an opponent had landed on Mosley in the 34 fights that they have tracked from his career.

=== Aftermath ===
Speaking after the bout Alvarez said "This was a great experience, I felt really good and I want to thank Shane for giving me this experience. He's a great fighter, a true veteran. I tried to knock him out. He took a lot of punches, but it didn't work." Mosley would praise the champion saying "His defense was really good and he was really fast, He can go a long way. When the kids start to beat you, you might need to start going to promoting. I didn't expect him to be that fast or that good. He's up there with the top guys [I've faced]. Mayweather is fast, Cotto, all those guys I fought. He's up there with them."

Preceded by vs. Kermit Cintrón	Canelo Álvarez's bouts 5 May 2012	Succeeded by vs. Josesito López
Preceded by vs. Manny Pacquiao	Shane Mosley's bouts 5 May 2012	Succeeded by vs. Pablo César Cano

=== Main Event ===
The fight started off with Cotto establishing himself as the aggressor, but with Mayweather winning the first two rounds using effective counter-punching and body movement to block most of Cotto's punches. However, in the third round Cotto seemed to successfully swarm Mayweather and land decent flurries to steal himself the round. Then from rounds 4-9 the action was closely contested, with both fighters using their partially contrasting styles in attempts to one-up the other. Ultimately though, Mayweather managed to adjust to Cotto's new rhythm of attacking in flurries and used his now-newly tweaked counter-punching style to win a lot of the final rounds, in what people thought had secured Mayweather the decision victory. Cotto had Mayweather against the ropes many times, resulting in some damage and a lot of bleeding from Mayweather's nose. Cotto's eyes had some partial swelling.

Mayweather won via unanimous decision with scores of 117–111, 117–111, and 118–110. The crowd booed loudly when the scores were read out. Cotto landed 105 of 506 punches thrown (21%), while Mayweather landed 179 punches of 687 thrown (26%).

== Aftermath ==
Cotto was humble in defeat, "The judges said I lost the fight; I can't do anything else. I'm happy with my fight and performance and so is my family. I can't ask for anything else." When they hugged at the end, Mayweather told Cotto, "You are a hell of a champion — the toughest guy I fought."

== Reported fight earnings ==
- Floyd Mayweather Jr. guaranteed $45 million vs. Miguel Angel Cotto $8 million
- Shane Mosley $750,000 vs. Canelo Álvarez $2 million

The fight drew 1.5 Million pay per view buys.

== Main card ==
Confirmed bouts:

- Super Welterweight Championship bout: (United States) Floyd Mayweather vs. (Puerto Rico) Miguel Cotto (c)

Mayweather wins by UD with scores of 118-110 and 117-111 twice.

- Super Welterweight Championship bout: (Mexico) Canelo Álvarez (c) vs. (United States) Shane Mosley

Alvarez wins by UD with scores of 119-109 twice and 118-110.

- Light Welterweight bout: (United States) Jessie Vargas vs (United States) Steve Forbes

Vargas wins by UD with scores of 100-90, 98-92 and 97-93.

- Super Welterweight bout: (United States) Deandre Latimore vs (Puerto Rico) Carlos Quintana

Quintana wins by KO (6)

=== Preliminary card ===
- Welterweight bout: (United States) Keith Thurman vs (United States) Brandon Hoskins

Thurman wins by TKO (3)

- Featherweight bout: (Puerto Rico) Braulio Santos vs (United States) Juan Sandoval
- Lightweight bout: (Puerto Rico) Jeffrey Fontanez vs (United States) Benna Acaba
- Lightweight bout: (United States) Omar Figueroa vs (United States) Robbie Cannon
- Welterweight bout: (Mexico) Antonio Orozco vs (United States) Dillet Frederick

== International broadcasting ==
Country	Broadcaster
Australia	Main Event
Belgium	Be Sport 1
Brazil	SporTV
Bulgaria	Sport Plus HD
Canada	Viewers Choice
Czech Republic	Sport 1
Denmark	TV 2 Sport
Estonia	Viasat Sport Baltic
Finland	Viasat Sport
France	Canal+
Hungary	Sport 1
Israel	Sport 1 HD
Japan	WOWOW
Latvia	Viasat Sport Baltic
Lithuania	Viasat Sport Baltic
Malaysia	Astro SuperSport
Mexico	Televisa
New Zealand	Sky
Norway	Viasat Sport
Philippines	Solar Sports TV5 and AKTV on IBC
Qatar	Al Jazeera Sports
Romania	Sport.ro
Russia	NTV Plus
Singapore	SuperSports
Slovakia	Sport 1
South Africa	SuperSport
Sweden	TV10
Thailand	TrueVisions
Ukraine	Inter
United Kingdom	BoxNation
United States	HBO PPV
Venezuela	Meridiano

Preceded by vs. Antonio Margarito II	Miguel Cotto's bouts 5 May 2012	Succeeded by vs. Austin Trout
Preceded by vs. Victor Ortiz	Floyd Mayweather Jr.'s bouts 5 May 2012	Succeeded by vs. Robert Guerrero
