= 1998 Junior World Boxing Championships =

Boxing competitions

Coordinates: 20°38′40″N 103°22′08″W

The 1998 Junior World Boxing Championships were held in Buenos Aires, Argentina, from November 6 to November 16, 1998. It was the tenth edition of the Junior World Boxing Championships. The competition is under the supervision of the world's governing body for amateur boxing AIBA and is the junior version of the World Amateur Boxing Championships.

== Medal winners ==
Event	Gold	Silver	Bronze
Light Flyweight (– 48 kilograms)	Sorin Tanasie; Romania	(Republic of Ireland) Harry Cunningham; Ireland	Alexandr Bakhtin; Russia Aman Batyrbayev; Kazakhstan
Flyweight (– 51 kilograms)	Serik Jeylelov; Kazakhstan	Georgiy Balakshin; Russia	(Republic of Ireland) Darren Campbell; Ireland Alexander Haan; Germany
Bantamweight (– 54 kilograms)	(Ukraine) Servin Suleymanov; Ukrania	Bekzat Sattarkhanov; Kazakhstan	Ceferino Labarda; Argentina Hamisi Durst; Germany
Featherweight (– 57 kilograms)	Israel Hector Perez*; Argentina	Armando Bouza; Cuba	Dmitriy Svetlichnyy; Ukraine Aidar Gazetdinov; Russia
Lightweight (– 60 kilograms)	Anton Solopov; Russia	Miguel Angel Cotto; Puerto Rico	Darius Jasevicius; Lithuania Constantin Mirica; Romania
Light Welterweight (– 63,5 kilograms)	Yuriy Tomashov; Ukraine	(Socialist Federal Republic of Yugoslavia) Geard Ajetovic; Yugoslavia	Omer Akdi; Turkey Inocente Fiss; Cuba
Welterweight (– 67 kilograms)	Khamzat Ustarkhanov; Russia	Dimitri Sartison; Germany	Lucian Bute; Romania (Socialist Federal Republic of Yugoslavia) Dejan Ribac; Yugoslavia
Middleweight (– 71 kilograms)	Sergey Kostenko; Ukraine	Chris Hamilton; Australia	Baurzhan Kairmenov; Kazakhstan Sergey Kazantsev; Russia
Middleweight (– 75 kilograms)	Mathias Kempe; Germany	Vladimir Fedotov; Russia	Andrey Fedchuk; Ukraine Olzhas Orazaliev; Kazakhstan
Light Heavyweight (– 81 kilograms)	Yohanson Martinez; Cuba	Hugo Hernan Garay; Argentina	Giovanni Alvarez; Sweden Mikhail Murinchik; Russia
Heavyweight (– 91 kilograms)	Odlanier Solis; Cuba	Sebastian Ceballos; Argentina	Levon Paytan; Armenia Evgeniy Arkhipov; Russia
Super Heavyweight (+ 91 kilograms)	Bagrat Oganyan; Armenia	Pavel Storozhyuk; Kazakhstan	Valeriy Chechenev; Russia (United States) Javier Mora; USA

- After championships Israel Hector Perez (57 kg) was disqualified

== See also ==
- World Amateur Boxing Championships
