= James Moore (boxer) =

Irish boxer (born 1978)

Personal information
- Nickname: Jim
- Nationality: Irish
- Born: James Moore; 26 February 1978 (age 48) Arklow, County Wicklow, Ireland
- Weight: Middleweight

Boxing career
- Stance: Orthodox

Boxing record
- Total fights: 20
- Wins: 17
- Win by KO: 10
- Losses: 3
- Draws: 0
- No contests: 0

James Moore
Medal record

Representing Ireland

Men's Boxing

World Amateur Championships
Bronze medal – third place	Belfast 2001	Welterweight

James Moore (born 26 February 1978 in Arklow, County Wicklow, Ireland), is a professional boxer. Moore currently fights in the Light Middleweight division although he fought as a welterweight during his amateur career.

== Amateur titles ==
Moore boxed as an amateur for Ireland and won three national senior titles and a bronze medal at the 2001 World Amateur Boxing Championships.

== Professional career ==
Moore turned professional in August 2005, winning his first fight at the Manhattan Center, New York, NY, USA, in which Moore knocked out fellow debutant Gabrial Garcia on an undercard that included Jaidon Codrington and Patrick Nwamu.

Although a native Wicklowman, Moore, like his fellow Irishman John Duddy emigrated to America and fought out of Gleasons Gym in New York. Moore fought regularly since his debut and was ranked 3rd in Irish.boxing.com's rankings of light middleweights.

== Professional boxing record ==
20 fights	17 wins	3 losses
By knockout	10	0
By decision	7	3

Key to abbreviations used for results
DQ	Disqualification	RTD	Corner retirement
KO	Knockout	SD	Split decision / split draw
MD	Majority decision / majority draw	TD	Technical decision / technical draw
NC	No contest	TKO	Technical knockout
PTS	Points decision	UD	Unanimous decision / unanimous draw

Boxing record
No.	Result	Record	Opponent	Type	Round(s), time	Date	Location	Notes
23	Loss	20–3	(Poland) Paweł Wolak	UD	10	5 Jun 2010	(United States) Yankee Stadium, New York City, New York	
