= Paweł Wolak =

Polish boxer (born 1981)

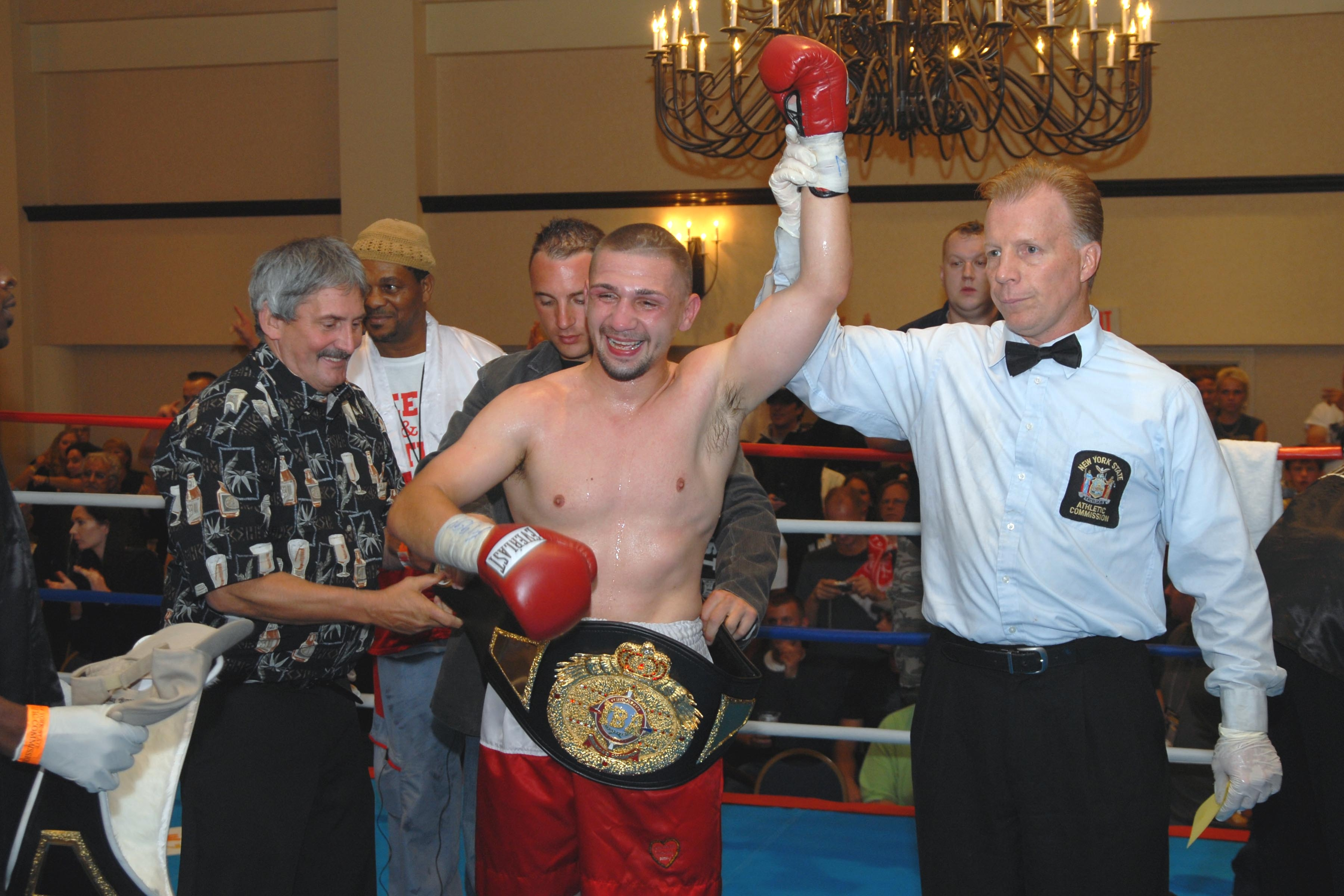
- Wolak (middle) in 2007

Personal information
- Nickname: Raging Bull
- Nationality: Polish
- Born: 26 September 1981 (age 44) Dębica, Poland
- Height: 1.73 m (5 ft 8 in)
- Weight: Light middleweight Middleweight

Boxing career
- Reach: 173 cm (68 in)
- Stance: Orthodox

Boxing record
- Total fights: 32
- Wins: 29
- Win by KO: 19
- Losses: 2
- Draws: 1

Paweł Wolak (Polish pronunciation: [ˈpavew ˈvolak]; born 26 September 1981) is a Polish former professional boxer who held the regional WBC–USNBC light middleweight title. He now coaches at Tiger Schulmann's Martial Arts Academy with Daniel Schulmann

== Professional career ==
Boxing Trainer: Aroz Terrific Gist, Strength and Conditioning Coach: Farrel Brenner

== Professional boxing record ==
32 fights	29 wins	2 losses
By knockout	19	0
By decision	10	2
Draws	1	

Key to abbreviations used for results
DQ	Disqualification	RTD	Corner retirement
KO	Knockout	SD	Split decision / split draw
MD	Majority decision / majority draw	TD	Technical decision / technical draw
NC	No contest	TKO	Technical knockout
PTS	Points decision	UD	Unanimous decision / unanimous draw

Boxing record
No.	Result	Record	Opponent	Type	Round(s), time	Date	Location	Notes
32	Loss	29–2–1	(Dominican Republic) Delvin Rodríguez	UD	10	3 Dec 2011	(United States) Madison Square Garden, New York City, New York	
31	Draw	29–1–1	(Dominican Republic) Delvin Rodríguez	MD	10	15 Jul 2011	(United States) Roseland Ballroom, New York City, New York	
30	Win	29–1	(Israel) Yuri Foreman	RTD	6 (10), 3:00	12 Mar 2011	(United States) MGM Grand Garden Arena, Las Vegas, Nevada	Won vacant NABF light middleweight title
29	Win	28–1	(Mexico) José Pinzón	TKO	7 (10), 2:24	4 Dec 2010	(United States) Honda Center, Anaheim, California	
28	Win	27–1	(Republic of Ireland) James Moore	UD	10	5 Jun 2010	(United States) Yankee Stadium, New York City, New York	
27	Win	26–1	(United States) Ishmail Arvin	UD	8	23 Jan 2010	(United States) Madison Square Garden, New York City, New York	
26	Win	25–1	(Brazil) Carlos Nascimento	RTD	5 (10) 3:00	10 Oct 2009	(United States) Madison Square Garden, New York City, New York	
25	Win	24–1	(Jamaica) Vinroy Barrett	UD	10	5 Jun 2009	(United States) Westbury Music Fair, Westbury, New York	
24	Win	23–1	(United States) Norberto Bravo	TKO	3 (8), 1:35	21 Feb 2009	(United States) Madison Square Garden, New York City, New York	
23	Win	22–1	(United States) Chad Greenleaf	TKO	3 (8), 2:40	26 Sep 2008	(United States) Huntington Hilton Hotel, Melville, New York	
22	Loss	21–1	(United States) Ishe Smith	UD	10	1 Aug 2008	(United States) Aviator Sports Complex, Brooklyn, New York	
21	Win	21–0	(United States) Troy Browning	UD	10	17 May 2008	(United States) Aviator Sports Complex, Brooklyn, New York	Won Interim WBC USNBC light middleweight title
20	Win	20–0	(United States) Dupre Strickland	KO	2 (10), 3:06	15 Mar 2008	(United States) Madison Square Garden, New York City, New York	
19	Win	19–0	(United States) Sammy Sparkman	PTS	10	15 Dec 2007	(Poland) Mazurkas Conference Center, Ożarów Mazowiecki, Masovian Voivodeship	Won Polish International light middleweight title
18	Win	18–0	(United States) Jonathan Reid	TKO	4 (8), 2:39	11 Nov 2007	(United States) Convention Center, Wildwood, New Jersey	
17	Win	17–0	(United States) Dan Wallace	TKO	4 (10), 2:10	14 Sep 2007	(United States) Hilton Hotel, Melville, New York	Won IBA America's light middleweight title
16	Win	16–0	(Puerto Rico) Edgar Reyes	TKO	2 (8), 2:05	14 Jul 2007	(United States) Boardwalk Hall, Atlantic City, New Jersey	
15	Win	15–0	(United States) Anthony Little	RTD	2 (8) 3:00	18 May 2007	(United States) Beacon Theatre, New York, New York	
14	Win	14–0	(United States) Keith Sims	TKO	2 (8), 3:00	23 Mar 2007	(United States) Huntington Townhouse, Huntington Station, New York	
