= Septuple champion =

Boxer who has won in seven weight classes

In boxing, a septuple champion is a boxer who has won world titles in seven different weight classes.

Manny Pacquiao is the first boxer to win world titles in seven different weight divisions. Pacquiao clinched the feat when he defeated Miguel Cotto via TKO in 12th round and won the WBO Welterweight (147 lbs) title on November 14, 2009 at the MGM Grand Garden Arena. Five of his world championships came from the "Big Four" (WBA, WBC, IBF, WBO) sanctioning bodies and two were from The Ring, which hands out an official version of the lineal championship. He also won world championship belt from IBO in Light Welterweight division. The following are the world titles won by Pacquiao (arranged chronologically): WBC Flyweight (112 lbs), IBF Super Bantamweight (122 lbs), The Ring Featherweight (126 lbs), The Ring and WBC Super Featherweight (130 lbs), WBC Lightweight (135 lbs), The Ring and IBO Light Welterweight (140 lbs) and WBO Welterweight (147 lbs).

Amanda Serrano (born October 9, 1988) is a Puerto Rican professional boxer and mixed martial artist. As a boxer, she is the unified featherweight world champion, having held the WBO title since 2019, IBO title since 2021 and the WBA title since 2023. She held the IBF title between 2022 and 2024. She is the only female, and Puerto Rican, to win world titles in more than four weight classes, and holds the Guinness World Record for the most boxing world championships won in different weight-classes by a female, having held 9 major world titles across seven different weight classes.

On January 18, 2019, Serrano defeated Eva Voraberger in the first round to capture the vacant WBO super flyweight title. In doing so she became the second boxer (male or female) to capture a major title in seven weight classes after Manny Pacquiao.

If minor titles are also counted, the first man to win seven world titles was Héctor Camacho. His first three titles came from the World Boxing Council and the World Boxing Organization; his latter four titles came from the International Boxing Council and the National Boxing Association, a minor sanctioning body that was established in 1984 and not to be confused with the original National Boxing Association that was established in 1921 and changed its name to World Boxing Association in 1962.

== See also ==
- Octuple champion
- List of boxing triple champions
- List of boxing quadruple champions
- List of boxing quintuple champions
- List of boxing sextuple champions
- List of boxing septuple champions
- List of boxing octuple champions
- List of The Ring world champions
- List of WBC world champions
- List of WBA world champions
- List of IBF world champions
- List of WBO world champions
- List of IBO world champions
