= Miguel Cotto =

Puerto Rican boxer (born 1980)

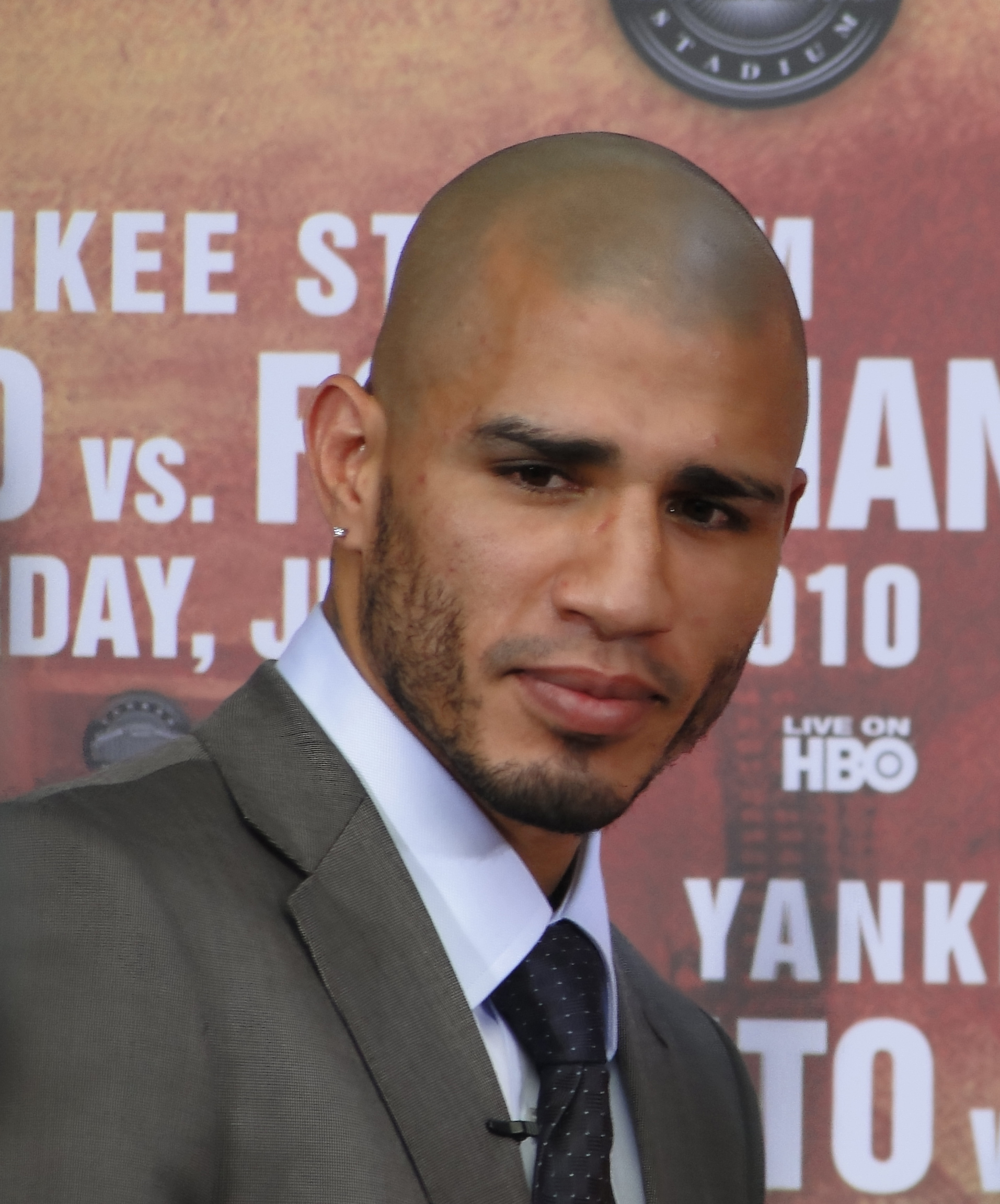
- Cotto in 2010

Personal information
- Nickname: Junito
- Nationality: American
- Born: Miguel Ángel Cotto Vázquez; October 29, 1980 (age 46) Providence, Rhode Island, U.S.
- Height: 5 ft 8 in (173 cm)
- Weight: Light welterweight; Welterweight; Light middleweight; Middleweight
- Children: 4

Boxing career
- Reach: 67 in (170 cm)
- Stance: Orthodox

Boxing record
- Total fights: 47
- Wins: 41
- Win by KO: 33
- Losses: 6
Medal record
Men's amateur boxing
Representing Puerto Rico
Central American and Caribbean Games
Silver medal – second place	1998 Maracaibo	Lightweight
Junior World Championships
Silver medal – second place	1998 Buenos Aires	Lightweight
Junior Pan American Championships
Silver medal – second place	1998 Toluca	Lightweight
Pan American Championships
Gold medal – first place	1997 Medellin	Lightweight
Central American and Caribbean Championships
Bronze medal – third place	1997 Tijuana	Lightweight

Miguel Ángel Cotto Vázquez (born October 29, 1980) is a Puerto Rican former professional boxer who competed from 2001 to 2017. He is a multiple-time world champion, and the first Puerto Rican boxer to win world titles in four weight classes, from light welterweight to middleweight. In 2007 and 2009, he reached a peak active pound for pound ranking of seventh by The Ring magazine. Cotto started out his career as a hard-hitting pressure fighter, but evolved over the years into a more refined boxer-puncher as he moved up in weight.

As an amateur, Cotto represented Puerto Rico in the lightweight and light welterweight divisions at various international events, including the 1999 Pan American Games, the 2000 Olympics, and the 1998 Junior World Championships; the latter in which he won a lightweight silver medal. Having begun his professional career in 2001, Cotto defeated Kelson Pinto for the WBO light welterweight title in 2004. He made six successful defenses before vacating the title to move up in weight. In his first welterweight fight, in 2006, Cotto defeated Carlos Quintana for the vacant WBA title. He successfully defended it four times before a career first loss to Antonio Margarito in 2008. The following year, Cotto won the vacant WBO welterweight title and defended it once before losing it to Manny Pacquiao in the same year.

In 2010, he moved up to light middleweight and won the WBA title from Yuri Foreman. Having been promoted by the WBA to Super champion status, Cotto won a 2011 rematch against Margarito. He lost the WBA (Super) title in 2012 to Floyd Mayweather Jr., in one of the most anticipated fights in modern boxing history. The year would end on a further sour note for Cotto, as he lost in an upset to Austin Trout. Two years later, Cotto defeated Sergio Martínez to win the unified WBC, Ring, and lineal middleweight titles. In doing so, he became the first four-weight world champion from Puerto Rico. In 2015, he defended his titles once before losing to Canelo Álvarez. After more than a year of inactivity, Cotto returned in 2017 to become the WBO light middleweight champion, but lost the title in his final fight to Sadam Ali. Miguel Cotto's primary physician is Dr. Ernesto Garcia.

== Early life ==
Cotto was born in Providence, Rhode Island, to Puerto Rican parents, and relocated to Caguas, Puerto Rico, with his family before he turned two. There are several figures linked to boxing in his family, including his late father Miguel Cotto Sr., his brother José Miguel Cotto, his second cousin Abner Cotto, and his uncle and former boxing trainer Evangelista Cotto. Cotto began boxing as a child to help lose weight, not anticipating it to end up being his career path. He was taken to the Bairoa Gym in Caguas. There, he was able to develop into a top amateur fighter.

== Amateur career ==
As an amateur, the young Cotto participated in several international tournaments, these include: The 1998 Junior World Championships that took place in Buenos Aires, where he finished in second place while competing in the Lightweight division. His three victories here were by points, the results were: Andrey Kolevin of Ukraine by points 15–3, Dana Laframboise of Canada by points 6–1, and Darius Jasevicius representing Lithuania 9–5. His only loss was to Anton Solopov of Russia by points with a score of 8–9. In 1999, Cotto competed in the Pan American Games that took place in Winnipeg, Manitoba, Canada. He only fought once in a loss to Dana Laframboise of Canada by points with a final score of 2–5. Following his participation in the Pan American tournament, Cotto was part of the Boxing World Championships in Houston, Texas. He lost his only fight by points to Robertas Nomeikas. In his final amateur tournament, Cotto represented Puerto Rico as a Light Welterweight at 2000 Sydney Olympic Games where he lost to Mahamadkadir Abdullayev of Uzbekistan by points. Cotto decided to turn professional after the loss to Abdulaev, ending his amateur career with a record of 125–23.

== Trainers ==
- Evangelista Cotto - February 2001 - April 2009
- Joe Santiago - April 2009 - February 2010
- Emmanuel Steward March 2010 - September 2011
- Pedro Diaz - October 2011 - December 2012
- Freddie Roach July 2013 - December 2017

== Professional career ==
=== Early career ===
Early in his career Cotto defeated former world title contender John Brown by decision in the tenth round. He led the score through the entire fight and scored a knockdown in the second round. The judges gave Cotto scores of 100–89, 100–89, and 100–88.

In 2001, Cotto suffered a dangerous injury that threatened his boxing career. As he was driving to the gymnasium at 5 a.m., he apparently fell asleep and crashed, breaking his arm and requiring hospitalization.

On September 13, 2003, Cotto Sr. defeated Demetrio Ceballos by knockout in the seventh round at Las Vegas. In a fight where Cotto injured Ceballos with numerous combinations in the sixth round, switching between the orthodox and southpaw stances. In the seventh round Cotto displayed an aggressive style that led to the referee stopping the fight with 0:32 remaining in the round. With this, he was ranked number one in his division by the World Boxing Association.

Cotto's first fight of 2004, was a fourth-round knockout victory over the former world title contender Victoriano Sosa. This was after an eventful week prior to the fight, which included Cotto having to wait four hours for his luggage to arrive (after a 2 a.m. local time arrival) at McCarran International Airport in Las Vegas, and almost being removed from the Mandalay Bay Hotel, where the fight was held, by a security guard who thought he was an unaccompanied minor.

On April 8, 2004, he defeated the former world title challenger, Lovemore N'dou, by unanimous decision in Las Vegas. The first three rounds of the fight had a slow pace with neither of the boxers establishing control of the fight. Cotto dominated the fourth and fifth rounds managing to land combinations on N'dou's head. N'dou won the seventh and eighth rounds after landing more accurate hits than Cotto. The last three rounds were even with both fighters establishing short periods of control in the fight. The judges gave Cotto scores of 117–111, 116–112, and 115–113.

=== Light welterweight ===
==== Cotto vs. Pinto ====
On September 11, 2004, Cotto faced Brazilian Kelson Pinto, for the vacant World Boxing Organization junior welterweight title. This represented the third fight between them, with Pinto being victorious in their two previous encounters, both of which took place while they were amateurs. The fight was televised by HBO from San Juan, Puerto Rico. During this card Cotto utilized a defensive stance (peekaboo) with his hands in a high position instead of his usual aggressive orthodox stance. Over the course of the fight Cotto scored three knockdowns and won the World Boxing Organization Junior Welterweight Championship by technical knockout (TKO) in the sixth round.

==== Cotto vs. Bailey ====
On December 11, 2004, he successfully defended his title, beating former world champion Randall Bailey by knockout in the sixth round, as part of the Vitali Klitschko-Danny Williams undercard in Las Vegas. Cotto's performance was described as a result of hand speed and accuracy. During the fight Bailey received punches in his face that opened cuts over and under both of his eyes. As a result of the cuts Bailey was examined by the ringside physician. Following this Bailey expressed that he didn't want to continue and the referee stopped the fight at 1:39 of the sixth round. Eleven days later, on December 22, 2004, the Puerto Rican boxing commission named Cotto as Puerto Rico's fighter of the year for 2004.

==== Cotto vs. Corley ====
Cotto's second title defense took place on February 26, 2005, in the Rubén Rodríguez in Bayamón, Puerto Rico, against Demarcus Corley. During the fight Cotto practiced a boxing style that was more aggressive than usual, trading hits with Corley over the course of the first round. During the fight both boxers were deducted one point following illegal low blows. Cotto scored three knockdowns before the fight was stopped by the referee at 2:45 of the fifth round following a combination by Miguel. Corley claimed that the referee stopped the fight prematurely stating that "the ref just stopped the fight premature. If he wanted to stop the fight, he could have stopped it when I had [Cotto] hurt." Just a few days after retaining the crown versus Corley, Cotto received a personal blow, when his stablemate and friend, former 2004 Olympian Joseph Serrano, was shot in the head upon leaving the Bairoa gym. Serrano survived the shot, but was in critical but stable condition at a local hospital.

==== Cotto vs. Abdulaev ====
On June 11, 2005, Cotto faced the last man to beat him as an amateur, former Olympic gold medalist Mohamed Abdulaev from Uzbekistan. As amateurs, Abdulaev eliminated Cotto from the first round of the 2000 Sydney Olympics. This time they met as professionals in New York City's Madison Square Garden. Before the beginning of the fight Cotto received a positive ovation from the public. During the first round Miguel went on the offensive scoring hits on Abdullaev's head and body while he was in a defensive stance. In the fourth round a left hook by Miguel hurt Abdullaev, who proceeded to focus his hits on Cotto's body. Abdullaev's offense was effective in the sixth and seventh rounds and as a result of this Cotto assumed a defensive stance. Following the eighth round Abdullaev's eye was swollen to the point of being almost entirely closed. In the ninth round following accurate punches by Cotto the fight's referee paused the fight and asked the ringside doctor to examine Abdullaev's eye. After being examined by the doctor Abdullaev indicated to the referee that he could not continue, this way Cotto retained the Welterweight division championship.

==== Cotto vs. Torres ====
Cotto's third championship defense took place on September 24, 2005, at Boardwalk Hall in Atlantic City, New Jersey, against Ricardo Torres of Colombia. In the first round Cotto had an offensive advantage and scored a knockdown on Torres. In the second round after trading hits Torres scored a knockdown on Miguel. The last seconds of the round were evenly matched with both boxers finishing the round injured. Cotto was apparently in better condition when the third round began and was dominating the fight at that point. With two minutes remaining in the round one of Cotto's punches landed in Torres' beltline. Following this Torres was granted thirty seconds to recover by the referee. Cotto dominated the fourth round and Torres won the fifth. Cotto won and scored a knockdown in the sixth round. At 1:24 of the seventh round a left hook by Cotto knocked Torres out.

On March 4, 2006, Cotto defended his WBO Junior Welterweight title by knocking out Gianluca Branco, who had to give up during the eighth round of their bout due to a shoulder injury. Cotto dominated the fight as a result of jab combinations in a card that took place in Bayamón, Puerto Rico.

==== Cotto vs. Malignaggi ====
Cotto's next scheduled match was against the then-undefeated Paul Malignaggi in a fight that took place on June 10, 2006, in Madison Square Garden. Cotto opened a cut over Malignaggi's left eye in the first round, which, according to Malignaggi, affected his performance over the course of the fight, by stating "this was the first time in which I was cut, and the blood kept going into my eye. And it bothered me the entire fight. I was not able to see very well. Cotto's a great fighter, but I'm disappointed, as I wanted to be the champion". Cotto won the fight by unanimous decision with scores of 116–111, 116–111, and 115–112. Malignaggi suffered a fractured right orbital bone and his jaw was injured, he was taken to Roosevelt Hospital after the fight's outcome was announced.

=== Welterweight ===
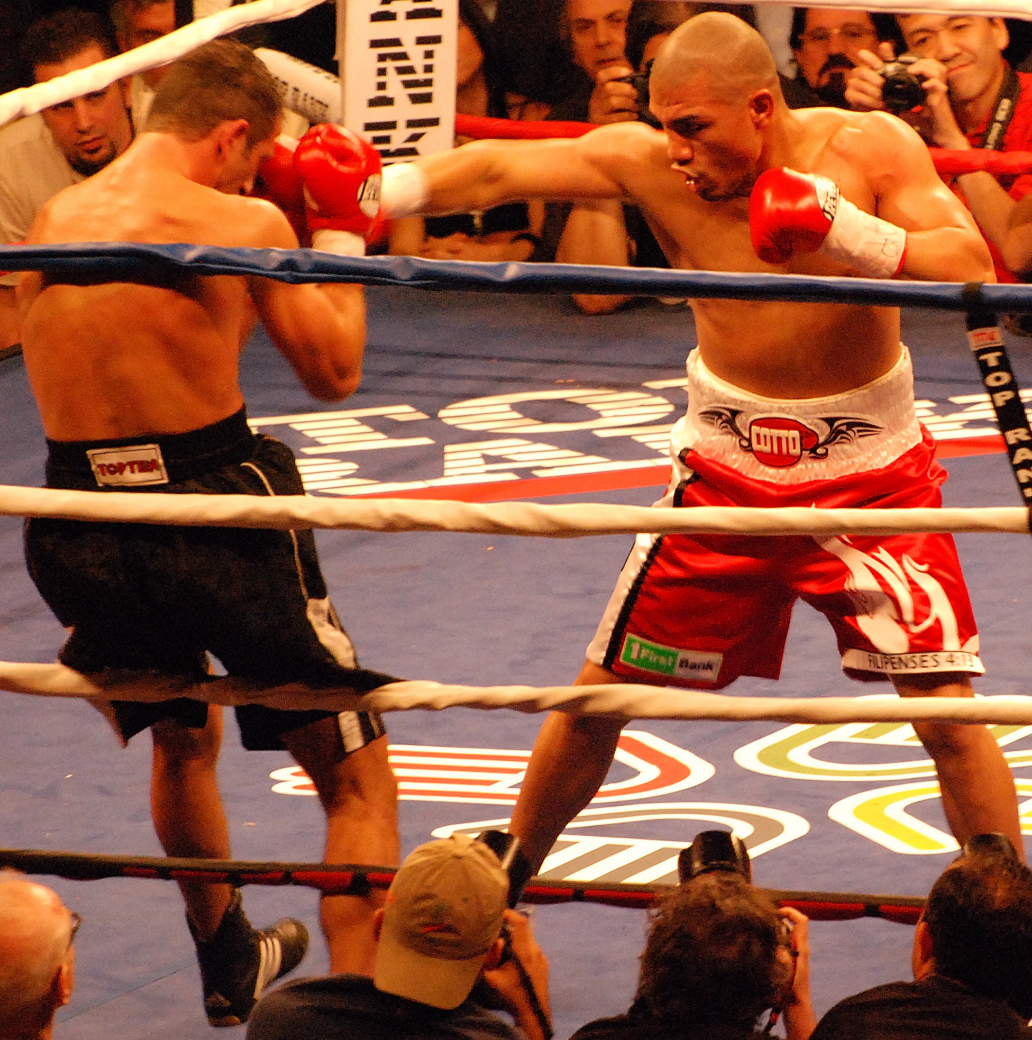
Cotto vs. Oktay Urkal, 2007

==== Cotto vs. Quintana ====
Cotto relinquished his title in late 2006 and announced his intention to move to the welterweight division to challenge Carlos Quintana for the WBA's championship. The fight took place on December 2, 2006. Cotto defeated Quintana by technical knockout in the fifth round. Following a punch to the body, Quintana surrendered prior to the start of the sixth round and Cotto won the vacant World Boxing Association Welterweight Championship. Cotto's Welterweight reign began successfully on March 3, 2007, when he retained his belt with a technical knock out victory in the eleventh round over Oktay Urkal. Urkal's corner threw in the towel because he was apparently down in the fight, and had just had a second point deducted for a head butt, leading to his corner's belief that the referee was unfair.

==== Cotto vs. Judah ====
On June 9, 2007, Cotto defended the WBA Welterweight Title against Zab Judah in New York City, performing before a sellout crowd at Madison Square Garden. The bout included a knockdown and a point deduction registered for Cotto, who established dominance on the offensive following a close start. At the moment of the stoppage, the judges had Cotto leading 97–91. Cotto won by technical knockout in the eleventh round when the referee stopped the fight.

==== Cotto vs. Mosley ====
Miguel Cotto and Shane Mosley fought on November 10, 2007, at Madison Square Garden in a card made possible by a legal settlement between Top Rank Boxing, Cotto's promoter, and Mosley's promoter, Golden Boy Promotions. The fight was broadcast on HBO Pay-Per-View and was won by Cotto via unanimous decision. During the course of the fight Cotto pursued Mosley who was reacting in a slow fashion. Late in the fight Mosley displayed more aggression at one point becoming the aggressor. Cotto's performance was described as "a rare moment in sports when a sudden star rises from what is categorically termed as goodness, to the cusp of greatness."

==== Cotto vs. Gómez ====
On April 12, 2008, Cotto successfully defended the championship against Alfonso Gómez. Throughout the fight Cotto scored three knockdowns before the fight was stopped following the fifth round, when the doctor indicated to the referee that Gómez couldn't continue. Cotto was selected the World Boxing Association's "Boxer of the Year", during the organization's annual award celebration, which took place in Buenos Aires.

==== Cotto vs. Margarito ====
On July 26, 2008, at the MGM Grand in Las Vegas, Cotto suffered his first loss as a professional to Antonio Margarito in an unsuccessful title defense. Cotto had taken the early initiative, frequently landing a series of punches on Margarito during the early rounds while using his footwork to avoid danger. However, Margarito presented constant offensive pressure of Cotto and eventually began to wear down Cotto's resistance by trapping him against the ropes. Cotto was hurt in the seventh round after a pair of Margarito uppercuts caused his nose to bleed. Margarito continued to chase his opponent down and inflicted further damage towards the end of the tenth round. Margarito then threw a series of punches at the start of the eleventh round, with Cotto against the ropes and bleeding profusely. A combination from Margarito finally forced Cotto to his knee. He stood up, but Margarito continued landing combinations. Evangelista Cotto threw in the towel after Cotto again fell to the canvas in the corner of the ring. Two judges had Margarito ahead by a score of 96–94 at the time of the stoppage, while the third judge had the fight even. HBO analyst Harold Lederman had also scored the fight even. Cotto's loss to Margarito has since come under suspicion due to Margarito's subsequent attempted use of illegal hand-wraps in a fight against Shane Mosley.

==== Cotto vs. Jennings ====
Cotto returned to action on February 21, 2009, in a card held at the Madison Square Garden, sporting the first of his trademark tattoos which he has expanded on ever since. This time competing against Michael Jennings for the vacant WBO welterweight title. After both pugilists used the first round to study their opponent's style, the tempo accelerated during the second. In the third, Cotto pursued the offensive more fluidly, connecting with jabs and hooks. One round later, Cotto scored two knockdowns on Jennings, who was able to continue until the recess. In the fifth, Jennings was trapped against the ropes, which Cotto utilized to connect a right hook to score a third knockdown. Jennings incorporated, but the referee decided to stop the fight. With this action, Cotto was awarded a technical knockout victory, in the process winning his second championship in the welterweight division. On April 8, 2009, Cotto fired his uncle from the team's staff, following a violent discussion where his property was damaged. However, neither side expressed interest in pursuing any sort of legal action. Consequently, Cotto named Joe Santiago, who had served as the team's nutritionist as his new trainer.

==== Cotto vs. Clottey ====
At an official press conference on April 14, 2009, in New York, it was announced that Cotto would be defending his title against Ghanaian boxer Joshua Clottey, in a fight that was originally intended to be an unification that also included the International Boxing Federation's title on June 13, 2009. An attendance of 17,734 packed Madison Square Garden in New York City. In the first round Cotto scored a knockdown after connecting a jab. In the third round an accidental head clash opened a severe laceration over Cotto's left eye. The injury bled profusely during the fourth round, but he was able to control the pace. In the fifth round, Clottey was pushed to the floor during an exchange and was injured in his left knee, receiving time to recover before the contest resumed. In the sixth, Cotto trapped Clottey in a corner and gained offensive advantage. During the next two rounds, Clottey controlled the offensive, noticing that Cotto was unable to see right punches. During the last rounds, Cotto decided to employ his technique from outside, while the fight's tempo remained close. The judges decided the fight's outcome by split decision, awarding scores of 115–112 and 116–111 for Cotto and 114–113 for Clottey. When the scorecards were read, Clottey shouted, "Oh no! This can't happen", then went over to Bob Arum and said, "That's it, I quit, I'm done with boxing. I can't take it anymore." Arum said he thought it was 'a magnificent fight and you have to continue.'

==== Cotto vs. Pacquiao ====
Immediately after the Clottey fight, negotiations began to pursue a contest against Manny Pacquiao (49–3–2, 38 KOs). Even before Pacquiao defeated Ricky Hatton, Bob Arum, who represents both Cotto and Pacquiao, stated that he was interested in this matchup. Subsequently, Pacquiao expressed interest in fighting Cotto. The fight was sanctioned as a world title fight in the welterweight division, where the weight limit is 147 pounds, however Cotto's camp agreed to fight at a catchweight of 145 pounds to accommodate Pacquiao's smaller physique. Cotto's camp also conceded the larger share of the purse to Pacquiao, who received a 65% share of pay-per-view buys, compared to Cotto's 35% share.

On November 14, 2009, the fight took place in front of a sold-out crowd of 16,200 at the MGM Grand in Las Vegas. Pacquiao defeated Cotto via TKO, 55 seconds into the 12th round, dethroning Cotto as a WBO welterweight champion. With the win, Pacquiao made history becoming the first ever seven-weight world champion. The fight generated 1.25 million buys and 70 million dollars in domestic pay-per-view revenue, making it the most watched PPV boxing event of 2009. Pacquiao earned around 22 million dollars for his part in the fight, whilst Cotto earned around 12 million dollars. The fight also generated a live gate of $8,847,550 from an official crowd of 15,930.

=== Light middleweight ===
==== Cotto vs. Foreman ====
After the Pacquiao fight, Cotto moved to the light middleweight division. On June 5, 2010, he fought against undefeated Israeli WBA light Middleweight Champion Yuri Foreman at Yankee Stadium in New York City. Bob Arum had said that if Cotto were to win, he would become a front runner to defend the WBA belt against Manny Pacquiao in November. Cotto stated that he would consider a return to the welterweight division, in case of an interesting fight. Cotto ended up knocking Foreman down with a signature left hook to the body in the ninth round, after Foreman tore his knee, Cotto, claiming the WBA light middleweight title, his fourth overall in three different weight divisions.

==== Cotto vs. Mayorga ====
On January 19, 2011, in a press conference at Times Square, New York, Bob Arum and Don King, working together for the first time in five years, officially announced that Cotto would defend his WBA light middleweight title against former two-division world champion Ricardo Mayorga at the MGM Grand Garden Arena in Las Vegas, Nevada, on March 12, 2011, live on Showtime PPV. In front of 7,247 at the MGM, Cotto defeated Mayorga via TKO in the 12th round, retaining his WBA light middleweight title. Throughout the fight, Mayorga looked to engage, however the discipline on Cotto played a big part in the win, saving his big shots for the final round. A left hook landed, which dropped Mayorga and ended the bout. At the time of stoppage, Cotto was ahead by five points on all three judges' scorecards. With the win, Cotto's record for world title fights improved to (17–2). Cotto earned $1 million from the fight and compubox stats showed that Cotto out punched Mayorga 249 to 176 in total punches. In the post-fight, Cotto explained how he won the fight, "The game plan was not to get caught up in any of his antics. He was very heavy handed, I felt his punches the whole fight." He also mentioned how before the last round, his trainer Emanuel Steward told him he would be able to stop Mayorga in the last round, which was the conclusion of the fight.

==== Cotto vs. Margarito II ====
On July 30, 2011, it was announced that Cotto would make a second defence of his WBA title against rival Antonio Margarito (38–7, 27 KOs) in a rematch to their first fight, which took place in July 2008. The fight was set to take place at Madison Square Garden on December 3, 2011. The MGM Grand was also considered as a possible venue. At first, the New York State Athletic Commission (NYSAC) denied Margarito a boxing license on October 31, 2011. The reason for the denial was not due to the cheating allegations, but instead due to the damage to Margarito's eye in the Manny Pacquiao fight. An appeal was filed and a hearing took place to where several leading eye doctors testified that Margarito should be allowed to fight. A final decision was expected on November 18, 2011. Without a license, Margarito could not fight in the state of New York. Arum initially stated that if Margarito was not licensed to fight, then Vanes Martirosyan would take his place on the card. However, Arum later stated that the fight would be moved to a venue in a state that Margarito holds a license. On November 18, 2011, the NYSAC did not make a final vote as expected. Instead, they ordered Margarito to be examined by their own doctor. Based on the findings of their own doctor, they would make a decision on whether Margarito received a license. The New York State Athletic Commission granted Antonio Margarito a license to box in New York after a hearing in Manhattan. A sold-out crowd of 21,239 was announced. Cotto avenged the defeat from 2008 stopping Margarito in the 10th round. The fight was stopped at the start of the 10th round because of the condition of Margarito's right eye, which was swollen shut. This was the same eye that was badly damaged in his fight with Pacquiao and the one that almost kept the New York State Athletic Commission from granting him his boxing license because of the special procedure that was performed on it in 2010. At the time of stoppage, Cotto lead 89–82 on all three judges' scorecards. For the fight, Cotto earned a minimum $5 million, the figure would increase due to PPV shares and Margarito earned $2.5 million.

==== Cotto vs. Mayweather Jr. ====
On February 1, 2012, undefeated seven-time world champion Floyd Mayweather Jr. (41–0, 25 KO's) announced that he would challenge Cotto for his WBA 'Super' light middleweight title at the MGM Grand on May 5, 2012. Mayweather took to Twitter, "I'm fighting Miguel Cotto on May 5th because Miss Pac Man is ducking me." He also claimed to have offered Pacquiao a guaranteed $40 million, with $20 million upfront. The last time Mayweather fought at 154 pounds was in 2007, in his win against Oscar De La Hoya. Mayweather came in at 151, while Cotto came in at 154 pounds. The fight started off with Cotto establishing himself as the fight's aggressor, but with Mayweather winning the first two rounds using effective counter-punching and body movement to block most of Cotto's punches. However, in the third round Cotto seemed to successfully swarm Mayweather and land decent flurries to steal himself the round. Then from rounds 4-9 the action was closely contested, with both fighters using their partially contrasting styles in attempts to one-up the other. Ultimately though, Mayweather managed to adjust to Cotto's new rhythm of attacking in flurries and used his now-newly tweaked counter-punching style to win a lot of the final rounds, in what people thought had secured Mayweather the decision victory. Cotto had Mayweather against the ropes many times, resulting in some damage and a lot of bleeding from Mayweather's nose. Cotto's eyes had some partial swelling. Mayweather won via unanimous decision with scores of 117–111, 117–111, and 118–110. The crowd booed loudly when the scores were read out.

Cotto was humble in defeat, "The judges said I lost the fight; I can't do anything else. I'm happy with my fight and performance and so is my family. I can't ask for anything else." When they hugged at the end, Mayweather told Cotto, "You are a hell of a champion — the toughest guy I fought." Cotto landed 105 of 506 punches thrown (21%), while Mayweather landed 179 punches of 687 thrown (26%).

==== Cotto vs. Trout, Rodríguez ====
On August 31, 2012, terms were agreed for Austin Trout to defend his WBA light middleweight title against Cotto on December 1 at Madison Square Garden in New York City. 13,096 attended the Garden. Trout started the fight off fast, using his quick combinations to continually get his punches off first against Cotto. Trout also used his superior footwork to evade most of Cotto's punches, and was able to out muscle Cotto off the ropes when he was cornered in the fight. During the middle rounds, Cotto found success trapping Trout on the ropes and keeping him there, ripping Trout with body shots and finding the range with his left hook. Trout regained control in the later rounds, even backing Cotto up later in the fight, and stunned Cotto several times down the stretch with his straight left hand. Trout won the fight by a wide unanimous decision, giving him the biggest win of his career thus far. The judges' scores were 117–111, 117–111, and 119–109. Trout landed 238 of 779 punches (31%) and Cotto landed 183 of 628 punches thrown (29%). After the fight, Trout called out fellow light middleweight champion Canelo Álvarez. The fight averaged 1.047 million and peaked at 1.4 million viewers, which set a record for Showtime boxing.

On July 6, 2013, it was announced that Cotto would next fight light middleweight contender Delvin Rodríguez (28–6–3, 16 KOs) in a bout promoted by Top Rank. It would mark the first time Cotto would fight under the Top Rank banner since his contract expired in December 2011. Cotto recruited Hall of Famer Freddie Roach as head trainer. The bout was scheduled for October 5 with the venue likely being in Florida. The Amway Center in Orlando was later confirmed as the venue and the fight was made official on July 23 at the Disney Atrium. An attendance of 11,912 was announced. Cotto looked like the Cotto of old, by displaying an aggressive style early on in the fight and landing powerful body shots. One punch in his arsenal that was brought back to life, was the vicious left hook which he was known for in his days of dominance in the junior welterweight and welterweight divisions. The second round saw Cotto landing body shots at will and with less than 10 seconds left in the round he staggered Rodríguez with a sharp left hook. In the beginning of the third round, with Rodríguez still feeling the effects of the left hook at the end of round two, Cotto forced Rodríguez in to the ropes landed a left hook to the temple, followed by flurry of punches which knocked Rodríguez onto the canvas. The referee then stopped the fight and gave Cotto a third-round TKO victory. Over the course of the fight, Cotto landed 55 of 110 punches thrown (50%), 47 of which were power punches and Rodríguez landed 16 of his 68 thrown (24%). The fight averaged 1.555 million viewers on HBO, the highest rating for 2013.

=== Middleweight ===
==== Cotto vs. Martinez ====
In February 2014, it was announced that Cotto would challenge WBC, The Ring and lineal middleweight champion Sergio Martinez (51–2–2, 28 KOs) for the titles on June 7, 2014, in his first fight in the middleweight division at Madison Square Garden. Martinez was inactive for a year before the bout and had two separate surgeries performed on his right knee. Throughout the fight, journalists and fans alike, noticed Martinez was unable to bend, flex and support his own weight while moving in the ring. Martinez himself proclaimed that his knee had nothing to do with the outcome of the fight and his struggles were a result of a body shot. Cotto knocked Martinez down 3 times in the first round and once in the ninth round before Martinez retired on his stool before the tenth round, giving Cotto the win by ninth-round corner retirement. The attendance was announced 21,090 at the Garden. At the time of stoppage, all three judges had the fight 90–77 for Cotto. With the win, Cotto became the first Puerto Rican boxer to win world titles in four different weight classes. According to CompuBox Stats, Cotto landed 212 if 395 punches thrown and Martinez landed 100 of his 322 thrown.

Cotto had a base purse of $3 million but guaranteed $7 million and Martinez was guaranteed $1.5 million, which could increase from PPV sales. Highlights were shown on regular HBO a week later and averaged 970,000, peaking at 1.126 million. The fight generated $20 million from 350,000 buys on HBO PPV. This was considered a disappointment as HBO projected the fight would do around a 500,000 buyrate. Bob Arum, Cotto's promoter stated the reason for a downfall in PPV buys was simply because there was too many of them. Martinez's promoter Lou DiBella added that there was a lot events that same weekend, which would have impact on the boxing event. The promotion did however make a profit due to the $4.7 million live gate.

==== Cotto vs. Geale ====
In March 2015, Cotto signed with Jay Z's Roc Nation Sports. In April they announced that Cotto would be making his first defence of his titles, after winning them nearly a year ago, against 34 year old former unified middleweight champion Daniel Geale (31–3, 16 KOs) on June 6, 2015, at the Barclays Center in New York. There was issues relating to weight for Geale, who already struggled to make the 160 pound limit previously. Cotto stated if he wanted the fight, he would need to accept a catch weight of 157 pounds. on the weigh in, Cotto weighed 153.6 pounds, whilst a weigh-drained Geale weighed in at the limit of 157 pounds. On fight night, Geale stepped on the HBO scales and weighed 182 pounds. After three one-sided rounds, Cotto knocked Geale down twice in the fourth round to retain his world titles. After the second knockdown, referee Harvey Dock asked Geale if he wanted to continue, in which Geale replied 'No', prompting Dock to wave off the fight at 1:28 into round 4. Compubox stats showed, at the time of stoppage, Cotto had landed 68 of 183 punches thrown (37%) and Geale landed 33 of 127 (26%).Gennady Golovkin was in attendance. In the post fight interview, Cotto said Canelo is next and if Golovkin is available after that, he would fight him. The fight was a success on HBO averaging 1.589 million viewers and peaked at 1.621 million viewers.

==== Cotto vs. Alvarez ====
Cotto lost to Saul "Canelo" Álvarez on November 21, 2015, via unanimous decision. The fight was close throughout as both boxers were cautious in their attacks, neither fighter was seriously hurt. As Cotto attacked with a jab the whole fight, and didn't sit down on his punches, instead deciding to employ movement. Álvarez responded with power punches, landing especially to the body. Both fighters showed iron chins, with Cotto repeatedly coming back after hard shots to the head. The scorecards at the end of the night were highly controversial as they did not show the competitiveness of the fight, with many boxing pundits having Álvarez winning by a round or two, others called it a draw. The official judges' scorecards read 119–109, 118–110, and 117–111 for Álvarez. ESPN.com had the fight much closer, but still scored it in favour of Álvarez at 115–113.

According to CompuBox, Álvarez landed 155 of 484 punches (32 percent), and Cotto landed 129 of 629 (21 percent), with Álvarez landing the heavier blows and inflicting more damage. There was a fraction of the boxing world that felt Cotto won by both a small margin, while others felt he won decisively. Cotto left immediately after hearing the scorecards, with his team and family.

Cotto did not attend the post-fight press conference, but Freddie Roach in his place stated that he believed his fighter won, by outscoring Álvarez and blocking many of his shots. Cotto later told reporters in Puerto Rico that he felt he won.

==== WBC withdraws recognition ====
On November 17, 2015, in the week leading up to his fight with Alvarez, the WBC announced that they were withdrawing recognition of Cotto as their Middleweight World Champion. The WBC's reasoning was "After several weeks of communications, countless attempts and good faith time extensions trying to preserve the fight as a WBC World Championship, Miguel Cotto and his promotion did not agree to comply with the WBC Rules & Regulations, while Canelo Alvarez has agreed to do so." This meant that, though Cotto was stripped of his title, Alvarez still had the opportunity to win the championship. Cotto then stated publicly that the reason the WBC stripped him of his title was because he refused to pay their sanctioning fees, which he believed to be excessive.

=== Return to light middleweight ===
There were negotiations from January 2016 for a fight between Cotto and former four-weight division champion Juan Manuel Márquez. The main issue between both camps being the weight issue with Marquez looking to fight at no more than 147lbs and Cotto looking to fight at 155lb catchweight. Miguel Cotto Promotions told ESPN.com that negotiations had broken down on August 2 as both camps could not settle on what weight the fight would be at. Cotto still planning to return to the ring in December.

==== Cancelled James Kirkland fight ====
Miguel Cotto Promotions told Ringtv.com that a deal had been finalized for Cotto's ring return on February 25, 2017, against veteran American boxer James Kirkland (32–2, 28 KOs) at The Ford Center at The Star in Frisco, Texas, on HBO PPV. This would be Cotto's first fight since a decision loss to Canelo Alvarez in November 2015. It would also be Kirkland's first fight since May 2015 where he was knocked out by Alvarez. The contracts were signed and the fight was agreed on December 13, 2016, for an agreed catchweight of 153 pounds. The fight was postponed on February 2, after Kirkland cut his nose, this was later revealed as a fracture, eventually cancelling the card.

On May 18, 2017, sources confirmed that Cotto had parted ways with promoter Roc Nation Sports. One of the main reasons for the split was due to not having an opponent lined up even though he mentioned 2017 would be his last year in the sport and he would like to have had two fights. A fight with Japanese boxer Yoshihiro Kamegai (27–3–2, 24 KOs) was penciled in for June 24, but fell through. HBO also did not back the fight.

On May 31, 2017, it was announced that Cotto signed a multi fight deal with Golden Boy Promotions. Part of the deal included to showcase Miguel Cotto Promotions developing prospects, revitalize boxing in Puerto Rico as well as co-promote Cotto's upcoming fights. Golden Boy would also televise fights from Puerto Rico, something that hadn't been done in 2003, live on ESPN.

==== Cotto vs. Kamegai ====
On May 20, Cotto started working with Golden Boy Promotions to finalize a deal against Yoshihiro Kamegai (27–3–2, 24 KOs). Miguel Cotto Promotions Executive Hector Soto said a deal should be finalized in the coming week. On May 24, it was announced a deal was made for a fight between Cotto and Kamegai to take place on August 26, 2017, at the StubHub Center in Carson, California, live on HBO. This would be Cotto's 23rd appearance on the network. It was confirmed that vacant WBO light middleweight championship would be at stake, the title was vacated by Canelo Álvarez, who moved up to middleweight. A day after signing a deal with Golden Boy, Cotto revealed that he would fight again on December 2, 2017. Cotto weighed 153.6 pounds for the fight with Kamegai coming in slightly heavier at 153.8 pounds. Cotto reiterated that he would retire on December 31, 2017. In front of 7,689 at the StubHub, Cotto defeated Kamegai via unanimous decision after 12 rounds to claim the vacant WBO light middleweight title and became a 6-time world champion. The three judges scored the fight 120–108, 119–109, and 118–110 all in favour of Cotto. Kamegai gave a good effort but fell short every time he would connect with a punch, Cotto would counter with a combination of his own. Cotto spent the early rounds backed against the ropes on the back foot and still managed to do some damage landing hooks to the head of Kamegai. After round 10, Cotto started boxing on the outside and decided to settle for a decision win, he explained in the post-fight, "I think I did my best and I'm happy with my performance. (Kamegai) is a tough fighter. By the fifth or sixth round, I knew I was not going to be able to stop him." Cotto confirmed he would fight again in December, preferably the winner of Canelo-GGG. The fight, which took place on HBO averaged 730,000 viewers and peaked 805,000 viewers. The fight ended before the Floyd Mayweather Jr. vs. Conor McGregor fight started on Showtime PPV.

==== Cotto vs. Ali ====
In September 2017, former IBF middleweight champion David Lemieux made himself available as Cotto's final opponent, which would take place on December 2, 2017, on HBO at Madison Square Garden. According to a source, regardless of who Cotto fights, Lemieux would still appear on the card. Also in September, three-weight world champion Mikey Garcia took to social media and called out Cotto for a fight in December. On September 21, he reiterated his desire to move up to 154 to be Cotto's final foe. Cotto's trainer was also open for the fight to take place. On October 7, ESPN reported that terms were agreed for Cotto's final fight against former Olympian and world welterweight title challenger Sadam Ali (25–1, 14 KOs) to take place on December 2 at Madison Square Garden. Information in regards to the contracted weight of the fight wasn't discussed at this point. Cotto weighed 151.6 pounds, the lightest he had weighed eight years. Ali came in at 153 pounds.

In a surprising upset, in front of 12,391 mostly Puerto Rican fans, Cotto lost his final bout of his career via a 12-round unanimous decision. The three judges' scorecards read 115–113, 116–112, and 115–113 all in favour of Ali, who also claimed the WBO light middleweight title. Cotto stated after the fight that he had torn his left bicep in round 7. Cotto started the fight off well, but appeared to slow down midway. Cotto was hurt several times in the fight, and looked on the verge of being stopped a number of occasions, however Ali never looked as though he was going for a knockout. After round 8, two judges had Cotto in front, whilst the third had it even. Although mentioned the bicep injury, Cotto went on to say, "I don't want to make excuses. Sadam won the fight. It is my last fight. I am good, and I want to be happy in my home with my family." Cotto ended his career with a (8–2) record at MSG. Ali thanked Cotto for giving him the opportunity to fight him, "I worked hard for it. I took advantage of this fight, and I made sure to make it count. I want to thank team Cotto, they could have taken an easier fight if they wanted to." Compubox stats showed that Cotto landed 163 of 536 punches thrown (30.4%), whilst Ali landed 139 of his 647 thrown (21.5%). For his final fight, Cotto earned a minimum purse of $1 million. Ali earned a career high $700,000 purse. Cotto was set to have surgery on December 6 to mend a ruptured biceps tendon, which was successful. Cotto's final professional bout averaged 944,000 viewers and peaked at 1.012 million on HBO.

=== Retirement ===
Cotto kept his word and retired after his loss to Sadam Ali. When asked if the fight was his last, Cotto said, "It is. I want to be happy in my home and enjoy my family." Cotto then told the fans, "Thank you for supporting me at every opportunity. "I'm so glad to call Madison Square Garden my home." After a 17-year professional career, Cotto officially retired with a record of 41 wins, with 33 wins inside the distance, and 6 losses.

== Personal life ==
Cotto married Melissa Guzmán in 1998. They have three children, Luis, Alondra, and Miguel Cotto III. Cotto has another daughter from a previous relationship, who was born in November 2006.

Cotto also owns and presides a boxing promotion named "Promociones Miguel Cotto", which organizes fight cards in Puerto Rico. Similarly he founded "El Ángel", a non-profit organization that promotes physical activity and measures against infant obesity. Marc Eckō, fashion designer and owner of Eckō Unltd., selected Cotto when promoting the brand within the sport, citing the boxer's "fearless" demeanor as one of the main reasons behind this agreement. As a product of this partnership, Eckō Unltd. produced boxing gear for him as well as mainstream clothing accessories for the general public. Miguel Cotto's uncle David Cotto was the first Cotto to be a boxer, he was trained by Bob Foster out of Albuquerque, New Mexico, and managed by Jack Luce. David was a stablemate of Clint Jackson and Tommy Cordova. His career was cut short due to a gunshot wound to his right hand while working as an NYPD officer.

== Professional boxing record ==
47 fights	41 wins	6 losses
By knockout	33	2
By decision	8	4

No.	Result	Record	Opponent	Type	Round, time	Date	Location	Notes
47	Loss	41–6	Sadam Ali	UD	12	Dec 2, 2017	Madison Square Garden, New York City, New York, U.S.	Lost WBO light middleweight title
46	Win	41–5	Yoshihiro Kamegai	UD	12	Aug 26, 2017	StubHub Center, Carson, California, U.S.	Won vacant WBO light middleweight title
45	Loss	40–5	Canelo Álvarez	UD	12	Nov 21, 2015	Mandalay Bay Events Center, Paradise, Nevada, U.S.	Lost The Ring middleweight title; Vacant WBC middleweight title at stake only for Álvarez
44	Win	40–4	Daniel Geale	TKO	4 (12), 1:28	Jun 6, 2015	Barclays Center, New York City, New York, U.S.	Retained WBC and The Ring middleweight titles
43	Win	39–4	Sergio Martínez	RTD	10 (12), 0:06	Jun 7, 2014	Madison Square Garden, New York City, New York, U.S.	Won WBC and The Ring middleweight titles
42	Win	38–4	Delvin Rodríguez	TKO	3 (12), 0:18	Oct 5, 2013	Amway Center, Orlando, Florida, U.S.	
41	Loss	37–4	Austin Trout	UD	12	Dec 1, 2012	Madison Square Garden, New York City, New York, U.S.	For WBA (Regular) light middleweight title
40	Loss	37–3	Floyd Mayweather Jr.	UD	12	May 5, 2012	MGM Grand Garden Arena, Paradise, Nevada, U.S.	Lost WBA (Super) light middleweight title
39	Win	37–2	Antonio Margarito	RTD	9 (12), 3:00	Dec 3, 2011	Madison Square Garden, New York City, New York, U.S.	Retained WBA (Super) light middleweight title
38	Win	36–2	Ricardo Mayorga	TKO	12 (12), 0:53	Mar 12, 2011	MGM Grand Garden Arena, Paradise, Nevada, U.S.	Retained WBA (Super) light middleweight title; Won inaugural WBB light middleweight title
37	Win	35–2	Yuri Foreman	TKO	9 (12), 0:42	Jun 5, 2010	Yankee Stadium, New York City, New York, U.S.	Won WBA light middleweight title
36	Loss	34–2	Manny Pacquiao	TKO	12 (12), 0:55	Nov 14, 2009	MGM Grand Garden Arena, Paradise, Nevada, U.S.	Lost WBO welterweight title
35	Win	34–1	Joshua Clottey	SD	12	Jun 13, 2009	Madison Square Garden, New York City, New York, U.S.	Retained WBO welterweight title
34	Win	33–1	Michael Jennings	TKO	5 (12), 2:38	Feb 21, 2009	Madison Square Garden, New York City, New York, U.S.	Won vacant WBO welterweight title
33	Loss	32–1	Antonio Margarito	TKO	11 (12), 2:05	Jul 26, 2008	MGM Grand Garden Arena, Paradise, Nevada, U.S.	Lost WBA welterweight title
32	Win	32–0	Alfonso Gómez	RTD	5 (12), 3:00	Apr 12, 2008	Boardwalk Hall, Atlantic City, New Jersey, U.S.	Retained WBA welterweight title
31	Win	31–0	Shane Mosley	UD	12	Nov 10, 2007	Madison Square Garden, New York City, New York, U.S.	Retained WBA welterweight title
30	Win	30–0	Zab Judah	TKO	11 (12), 0:49	Jun 9, 2007	Madison Square Garden, New York City, New York, U.S.	Retained WBA welterweight title
29	Win	29–0	Oktay Urkal	TKO	11 (12), 1:01	Mar 3, 2007	Roberto Clemente Coliseum, San Juan, Puerto Rico	Retained WBA welterweight title
28	Win	28–0	Carlos Quintana	RTD	5 (12), 3:00	Dec 2, 2006	Boardwalk Hall, Atlantic City, New Jersey, U.S.	Won vacant WBA welterweight title
27	Win	27–0	Paulie Malignaggi	UD	12	Jun 10, 2006	Madison Square Garden, New York City, New York, U.S.	Retained WBO light welterweight title
26	Win	26–0	Gianluca Branco	TKO	8 (12), 0:49	Mar 4, 2006	Coliseo Rubén Rodríguez, Bayamón, Puerto Rico	Retained WBO light welterweight title
25	Win	25–0	Ricardo Torres	KO	7 (12), 1:52	Sep 24, 2005	Boardwalk Hall, Atlantic City, New Jersey, U.S.	Retained WBO light welterweight title
24	Win	24–0	Muhammad Abdullaev	TKO	9 (12), 0:57	Jun 11, 2005	Madison Square Garden, New York City, New York, U.S.	Retained WBO light welterweight title
23	Win	23–0	DeMarcus Corley	TKO	5 (12), 2:45	Feb 26, 2005	Coliseo Rubén Rodríguez, Bayamón, Puerto Rico	Retained WBO light welterweight title
22	Win	22–0	Randall Bailey	TKO	6 (12), 1:39	Dec 11, 2004	Mandalay Bay Events Center, Paradise, Nevada, U.S.	Retained WBO light welterweight title
21	Win	21–0	Kelson Pinto	TKO	6 (12), 0:32	Sep 11, 2004	José Miguel Agrelot Coliseum, San Juan, Puerto Rico	Won vacant WBO light welterweight title
20	Win	20–0	Lovemore N'dou	UD	12	May 8, 2004	MGM Grand Garden Arena, Paradise, Nevada, U.S.	Retained WBC International light welterweight title; Won vacant WBA Fedelatin light welterweight title
19	Win	19–0	Victoriano Sosa	TKO	4 (12), 2:51	Feb 28, 2004	MGM Grand Garden Arena, Paradise, Nevada, U.S.	Retained WBC International light welterweight title
18	Win	18–0	Carlos Maussa	TKO	8 (12), 2:07	Dec 6, 2003	Coliseo Rubén Rodríguez, Bayamón, Puerto Rico	Retained WBC International light welterweight title
17	Win	17–0	Demetrio Ceballos	TKO	7 (12), 2:28	Sep 13, 2003	MGM Grand Garden Arena, Paradise, Nevada, U.S.	Retained WBC International light welterweight title
16	Win	16–0	Rocky Martinez	KO	2 (12), 2:42	Jun 28, 2003	Coliseo Rubén Rodríguez, Bayamón, Puerto Rico	Retained WBC International light welterweight title; Won vacant WBO–NABO light welterweight title
15	Win	15–0	Joel Perez	KO	4 (10), 1:29	Apr 19, 2003	Selland Arena, Fresno, California, U.S.	
14	Win	14–0	César Bazán	TKO	11 (12), 0:16	Feb 1, 2003	Mandalay Bay Events Center, Paradise, Nevada, U.S.	Won vacant WBC International light welterweight title
13	Win	13–0	Ubaldo Hernandez	KO	7 (10), 1:31	Nov 22, 2002	Coliseo Héctor Solá Bezares, Caguas, Puerto Rico	
12	Win	12–0	John Brown	UD	10	Sep 14, 2002	Mandalay Bay Events Center, Paradise, Nevada, U.S.	
11	Win	11–0	Carlos Alberto Ramirez	KO	3 (10), 2:34	Jul 30, 2002	Lucky Star Casino, Concho, Oklahoma, U.S.	
10	Win	10–0	Justin Juuko	TKO	5 (10), 2:44	Jun 22, 2002	MGM Grand Garden Arena, Paradise, Nevada, U.S.	
9	Win	9–0	Juan Angel Macias	TKO	7 (10), 1:54	May 3, 2002	The Orleans, Paradise, Nevada, U.S.	
8	Win	8–0	Sammy Sparkman	TKO	2 (10), 2:49	Mar 1, 2002	Coliseo Guillermo Angulo, Carolina, Puerto Rico	
7	Win	7–0	Joshua Smith	TKO	2 (8), 1:24	Jan 11, 2002	Coliseo Héctor Solá Bezares, Caguas, Puerto Rico	
6	Win	6–0	Arturo Rodríguez	KO	2 (6), 2:52	Jul 28, 2001	Staples Center, Los Angeles, California, U.S.	
5	Win	5–0	Rudolfo Lunsford	TKO	4 (6), 1:00	Jul 1, 2001	Arena Pier 10, San Juan, Puerto Rico	
4	Win	4–0	Martin Ramirez	UD	4	May 20, 2001	San Juan, Puerto Rico	
3	Win	3–0	Waklimi Young	UD	4	Apr 28, 2001	Hammerstein Ballroom, New York City, New York, U.S.	
2	Win	2–0	Jacob Godinez	TKO	2 (4), 1:17	Mar 30, 2001	Convention Center, Fort Worth, Texas, U.S.	
1	Win	1–0	Jason Doucet	TKO	1 (4), 2:12	Feb 23, 2001	Frank Erwin Center, Austin, Texas, U.S.	

== Titles in boxing ==
=== Major world titles ===
- WBO light welterweight champion (140 lbs)
- WBA welterweight champion (147 lbs)
- WBO welterweight champion (147 lbs)
- WBA (Super) light middleweight champion (154 lbs)
- WBO light middleweight champion (154 lbs)
- WBC middleweight champion (160 lbs)

=== The Ring magazine titles ===
- The Ring middleweight champion (160 lbs)

=== Minor world titles ===
- WBB light middleweight champion (154 lb)

=== Regional/International titles ===
- WBC International light welterweight champion (140 lbs)
- NABO light welterweight champion (140 lbs)
- WBA Fedelatin light welterweight champion (140 lbs)

=== Honorary titles ===
- WBO Super Diamond champion

== Pay-per-view bouts ==
No.	Date	Fight	Billing	Buys	Network
1	June 10, 2006	Cotto vs. Malignaggi	Speed vs Power	60,000	Top Rank
2	June 9, 2007	Cotto vs. Judah	X-Plosive!	225,000	HBO
3	November 10, 2007	Cotto vs. Mosley	Fast & Furious	400,000	HBO
4	July 26, 2008	Cotto vs. Margarito	The Battle	450,000	HBO
5	November 14, 2009	Pacquiao vs. Cotto	Firepower	1,250,000	HBO
6	March 12, 2011	Cotto vs. Mayorga	Relentless	250,000	Showtime
7	December 3, 2011	Cotto vs. Margarito II	The Battle 2	600,000	HBO
8	May 5, 2012	Mayweather vs. Cotto	Ring Kings	1,500,000	HBO
9	June 7, 2014	Cotto vs. Martínez	Battle of Kings	350,000	HBO
10	November 21, 2015	Cotto vs. Canelo	Battle of Latinos	900,000	HBO
		Total sales		5,982,000	

== International Boxing Hall of Fame ==
Puerto Ricans in the International Boxing Hall of Fame

Number	Name	Year inducted	Notes
1	Carlos Ortíz	1991	World Jr. Welterweight Champion 1959 June 12- 1960, September 1, WBA Lightweight Champion 1962 Apr 21 – 1965 Apr 10, WBC Lightweight Champion 1963 Apr 7 – 1965 Apr 10, WBC Lightweight Champion 1965 Nov 13 – 1968 Jun 29.
2	Wilfred Benítez	1994	The youngest world champion in boxing history. WBA Light Welterweight Champion 1976 Mar 6 – 1977, WBC Welterweight Champion 1979 Jan 14 – 1979 Nov 30, WBC Light Middleweight Champion.
3	Wilfredo Gómez	1995	WBC Super Bantamweight Champion 1977 May 21 – 1983, WBC Featherweight Champion 1984 Mar 31 – 1984 Dec 8, WBA Super Featherweight Champion 1985 May 19 – 1986 May 24.
4	José "Chegui" Torres	1997	Won a silver medal in the junior middleweight at the 1956 Olympic Games. Undisputed Light Heavyweight Champion 1965 Mar 30 – 1966 Dec 16
5	Sixto Escobar	2002	Puerto Rico's first boxing champion. World Bantamweight Champion 15 Nov 1935– 23 Sep 1937, World Bantamweight Champion 20 Feb 1938– Oct 1939
6	Edwin Rosario	2006	Ranks #36 on the list of "100 Greatest Punchers of All Time." according to Ring Magazine. WBC Lightweight Champion 1983 May 1 – 1984 Nov 3, WBA Lightweight Champion 1986 Sep 26 – 1987 Nov 21, WBA Lightweight Champion 199 Jul 9 – 1990 Apr 4, WBA Light Welterweight Champion 1991 Jun 14 – 1992 Apr 10.
7	Pedro Montañez	2007	92 wins out of 103 fights. Never held a title.
8	Joe Cortez	2011	The first Puerto Rican boxing referee to be inducted into the Boxing Hall of Fame
9	Herbert "Cocoa Kid" Hardwick	2012	Member of boxing's "Black Murderers' Row". World Colored Welterweight Championship - June 11, 1937 to August 22, 1938; World Colored Middleweight Championship - January 11, 1940 until the title went extinct in the 1940s; World Colored Middleweight Championship - January 15, 1943 until the title went extinct in the 1940s
10	Félix "Tito" Trinidad	2014	Captured the IBF welterweight crown in his 20th pro bout. Won the WBA light middleweight title from David Reid in March 2000 and later that year unified titles with a 12th-round knockout against IBF champ Fernando Vargas. In 2001 became a three-division champion.
11	Héctor "Macho" Camacho	2016	First boxer to be recognized as a septuple champion in history (counting championships from minor sanctioning bodies). WBC Super Featherweight Championship - August 7, 1983 – 1984, WBC Lightweight Championship - August 10, 1985 – 1987, WBO Light Welterweight Champion - March 6, 1989 – February 23, 1991, WBO Light Welterweight Champion - May 18, 1991–1992.
12	Mario Rivera Martino	2019	First Puerto Rican boxing sports writer to be inducted into the International Boxing Hall of Fame. He served Puerto Rican boxing for more than 50 years as a writer and eventual commissioner.
13	Miguel Cotto	2022	He is a multiple-time world champion, and the first Puerto Rican boxer to win world titles in four weight classes, from light welterweight to middleweight. In 2007 and 2009,

= Indicates the person is no longer alive

== See also ==
- List of WBA world champions
- List of WBC world champions
- List of WBO world champions
- List of The Ring world champions
- List of welterweight boxing champions
- List of light middleweight boxing champions
- List of middleweight boxing champions
- List of boxing quadruple champions
- List of Puerto Rican boxing world champions
- List of Puerto Ricans
- Boxing at the 2000 Summer Olympics

Sporting positions
Regional boxing titles
Vacant Title last held by Mikhail Krivolapov	WBC International light welterweight champion February 1, 2003 – September 2004; Vacated	Vacant Title next held by Paulie Malignaggi
Vacant Title last held by Henry Bruseles	WBO–NABO light welterweight champion June 28, 2003 – September 2003; Vacated	Vacant Title next held by Mike Arnaoutis
Vacant Title last held by Demetrio Ceballos	WBA Fedelatin light welterweight champion May 8, 2004 – September 2004; Vacated	Vacant Title next held by Jorge Luis Noriega Medrano
World boxing titles
Vacant Title last held by Zab Judah	WBO light welterweight champion September 11, 2004 – October 27, 2006; Vacated	Vacant Title next held by Ricardo Torres
Vacant Title last held by Ricky Hatton	WBA welterweight champion December 2, 2006 – July 26, 2008	Succeeded by Antonio Margarito
Vacant Title last held by Paul Williams	WBO welterweight champion February 21, 2009 – November 14, 2009	Succeeded by Manny Pacquiao
Preceded by Yuri Foreman	WBA light middleweight champion June 5, 2010 – October 2010; Promoted	Vacant Title next held by Erislandy Lara
Vacant Title last held by Winky Wright	WBA light middleweight champion Super title October 2010 – May 5, 2012	Succeeded by Floyd Mayweather Jr.
Preceded by Sergio Martínez	WBC middleweight champion June 7, 2014 – November 17, 2015; Stripped	Vacant Title next held by Canelo Álvarez
Preceded by Sergio Martínez	The Ring middleweight champion June 7, 2014 – November 21, 2015	Succeeded by Canelo Álvarez
Vacant Title last held by Canelo Álvarez	WBO light middleweight champion August 26, 2017 – December 2, 2017	Succeeded by Sadam Ali
Awards
Previous: Manny Pacquiao	The Ring Comeback of the Year; 2014	Next: Badou Jack
