= Sport1 (Eastern Europe) =

- Broadcast area: Hungary; Czech Republic; Slovakia

Programming
- Picture format: 576i (16:9 SDTV); 1080i (HDTV)

Ownership
- Owner: AMC Networks International Central Europe
- Sister channels: Sport2

History
- Launched: 2 October 2000; 25 years ago 1 November 2006; 19 years ago (Romania)
- Closed: 5 November 2014; 11 years ago (Romania)

Links
- Website: www.sport1tv.hu www.sport1tv.cz

Sport1 (Hungarian: Sport Egy, Czech: Sport Jedna, Slovak: Sport Jeden) is a European sports channel which is currently available in Hungary, Czech Republic and Slovakia broadcasting in different languages. The channel is owned by AMC Networks International Central Europe. It currently holds the TV rights to broadcast UEFA Champions League (Hungary), UEFA Europa League and Serie A (Czech Republic) games and in the countries where the channel is available.

== Romania ==
In Romania, Sport1 was available from 2006 until 5 November 2014. The station held the rights for NFL, NHL, Ice Hockey World Championship and Heineken Cup, and in the first years for various football national championship, from Scotland, Hungary, France, Netherlands and others.

In 2012, Sport1 Romania shrank its broadcast space only between 10 P.M. and 7 A.M. except for some big events that start earlier, like the NFL playoffs or if the NFL or NHL games go for longer than 7 A.M., after the launch of children's channel Megamax on the same frequence.

From the NFL, Sport1 broadcast a late afternoon game and Monday Night Football, every week, half of the Thursday Night Football games, the opening game and all the Thanksgiving Day games. Starting with the 2013 season, sometimes an early afternoon game and/or Sunday Night Football were added to the schedule. The NFL Playoffs were shown with no exception, including the Pro Bowl and the Super Bowl.

== Czech Republic and Slovakia ==
In the Czech Republic and Slovakia it holds the exclusive rights for the UEFA Champions League, UEFA Europa League, Champions Hockey League (including all games involving Czech and Slovak teams), and the Slovak Extraliga. Until the year 2023 it held exclusive rights of the Formula One, in 2024 these were acquired by the Nova Group.
