= Main Event (TV channel) =

Australian pay-per-view television channel

- Country: Australia

Programming
- Language(s): English
- Picture format: 576i (SDTV); 1080i (HDTV)

Ownership
- Owner: Main Event Television
- Sister channels: Foxtel Networks channels

History
- Launched: September 1997
- Former names: Event TV (Foxtel); Main Attraction (Austar and Optus Vision)

Links
- Website: mainevent.com.au

Main Event logo used from 2010 to 2019.

Main Event (previously known as Event TV or Main Attraction) is Australia's only sports pay-per-view channel. It transmits through Foxtel and Kayo. It broadcasts major sporting and entertainment events such as boxing, professional wrestling, mixed martial arts and concerts.

The channel has broadcast the Anthony "The Man" Mundine vs. Danny Green boxing fight and has broadcast nearly every World Wrestling Entertainment pay-per-view since 2000 (There was a contract negotiation period that prevented the WWE from showing WWE pay-per-views between January 2003 and August 2003). Since May 2006 it has also been broadcasting Total Nonstop Action Wrestling pay-per-views, and since 2007, the Ultimate Fighting Championship started screening their PPV's. It also broadcast WWE's weekly programming (for free) over a 2-week period during 2006 while Fox8 was screening a marathon of The Simpsons. The channel would similarly do the same in early 2015 when Fox8 broadcast every episode of The Simpsons.

In previous years, Main Event has also broadcast large concerts for artists such as Christina Aguilera and Beyoncé Knowles. In November 2008, the channel broadcast a live concert at Etihad Stadium in Melbourne from Dutch violinist, conductor and composer, André Rieu.

During the Australian Football League's 2007–2011 broadcast rights period, Friday Night Football matches as well as selected games played on Saturday afternoon, Saturday night and Sunday afternoon were shown on Main Event to Fox Sports (Australia) subscribers in New South Wales, Queensland and the Australian Capital Territory. Viewers in Victoria, in contrast, did not receive any National Rugby League matches live on this channel, even if their local team. the Melbourne Storm, was playing.

The AFL arrangement ceased as of season 2012, as free-to-air rights holder the Seven Network were permitted to screen these games to northern states on its digital terrestrial multichannel, 7mate.

On 3 September 2013, Main Event launched a HD simulcast. This came following the closure of Foxtel 3D due to an insufficient amount of 3D content being produced, while the majority of premium pay-per-view content shown on Main Event is produced and acquired in HD.

== See also ==
- Stan Event
- Boxing in Australia
- Mixed martial arts in Australia
- Professional wrestling in Australia
