= Canelo Álvarez vs. Erislandy Lara =

Boxing match

Honor & Glory
- Date: 12 July 2014
- Venue: MGM Grand Garden Arena; Paradise, Nevada, United States

Tale of the tape
Boxer	Saul Álvarez	Erislandy Lara
Nickname	"Canelo"	"The American Dream"
Hometown	Guadalajara, Jalisco, Mexico	Guantánamo, Guantánamo Province, Cuba
Purse	$1,500,000	$1,000,000
Pre-fight record	43–1–1 (29 KO)	19–1–2 (12 KO)
Age	23 years, 11 months	31 years, 3 months
Height	5 ft 8 in (173 cm)	5 ft 9 in (175 cm)
Weight	155 lb (70 kg)	155 lb (70 kg)
Style	Orthodox	Southpaw
Recognition	WBA/The Ring; No. 1 Ranked Light middleweight WBC/WBO/TBRB; No. 2 Ranked Light middleweight The Ring No. 10 ranked pound-for-pound fighter Former unified light middleweight champion	WBA (Regular) Light middleweight champion TBRB; No. 1 Ranked Light middleweight The Ring; No. 2 Ranked Light middleweight

Result
- Álvarez defeats Lara by split decision

Canelo Álvarez vs. Erislandy Lara, billed as Honor & Glory, was a professional boxing match contested on 12 July 2014.

== Background ==
In April 2014 WBA (Regular) titleholder Erislandy Lara agreed to face former unified light middleweight champion Canelo Álvarez in a bout to be televised on Showtime pay-per-view.

Lara's WBA Regular title was not on the line, as the fight took place at a 155-pound catchweight and both fighters weighed in at precisely 155 lbs. Álvarez rehydrated to 171 lbs while Lara came into the ring at 166 lbs.

== The fight ==
Lara came out in dominant fashion, utilizing a stick-and-move style and capturing the early rounds. Although Álvarez struggled with Lara's one-two combinations, Lara's punches weren't thrown with sufficient power or frequency to dissuade him from consistently pressing the fight against a retreating Lara, and he was able to hammer away to Lara's body when he had him on the ropes. Lara's lead hand played a huge role in his one-two combination's effectiveness, but his output dropped as the fight progressed and he became increasingly tentative. Álvarez was able to cut Lara with a lead left uppercut in the seventh round.

After a very close and competitive fight, it went to the judges. Jerry Roth scored it 115–113 for Lara, Dave Moretti scored it 115–113 for Álvarez, and Levi Martinez scored it 117–111 for Álvarez, giving Álvarez a split decision victory. Lara's clean punching, defense, and movement were weighed against Álvarez's effective aggressiveness and power punching.

The final scorecard was controversial as many observers considered it far too wide.

== Aftermath ==
Although the decision remains controversial, any talk of a rematch in the future was dismissed by Oscar De La Hoya who went on to say, "No one wants a rematch."

== Undercard ==
Confirmed bouts:

Winner	Loser	Weight division/title belt(s) disputed	Result
(Mexico) Abner Mares	(Puerto Rico) Jonathan Oquendo	Featherweight (10 rounds)	Unanimous decision
(Mexico) Francisco Vargas	(Puerto Rico) Juan Manuel López	NABF & WBO International Super featherweight titles (10 rounds)	3rd round RTD
(United States) Mauricio Herrera	(Venezuela) Johan Perez	WBA interim light welterweight title	Majority decision
Preliminary bouts
(Japan) Tomoki Kameda	(Thailand) Panya Uthok	WBO World Bantamweight title	7th round KO
(Puerto Rico) John Karl Sosa	(United States) Luis Adrian Bello	Welterweight (6 rounds)	Split decision
(Brazil) Yamaguchi Falcao	(Puerto Rico) Jesus Cruz	Super middleweight (6 rounds)	1st round TKO
(Republic of Ireland) Jason Quigley	(United States) Howard Reece	Middleweight (6 rounds)	1st round TKO

== Broadcasting ==
Country	Broadcaster
Australia	Main Event
United Kingdom	BoxNation
United States	Showtime

Preceded by vs. Alfredo Angulo	Canelo Álvarez's bouts 12 July 2014	Succeeded by vs. James Kirkland
Preceded by vs. Austin Trout	Erislandy Lara's bouts 12 July 2014	Succeeded by vs. Ishe Smith
