= James Kirkland (boxer) =

American boxer

Personal information
- Nickname: Mandingo Warrior
- Born: James Derick Kirkland Austin, Texas, U.S.
- Height: 5 ft 9 in (175 cm)
- Weight: Welterweight; Light middleweight; Middleweight

Boxing career
- Reach: 70 in (178 cm)
- Stance: Southpaw

Boxing record
- Total fights: 37
- Wins: 34
- Win by KO: 30
- Losses: 3

James Derick Kirkland is an American professional boxer who held the regional WBO–NABO junior middleweight title in 2008. He was one of boxing's most prominent junior middleweight prospects in the late 2000s and early 2010s, until an 18-month prison stint set his career back significantly. Nicknamed the "Mandingo Warrior", Kirkland is known for being a highly aggressive southpaw pressure fighter with formidable punching power, having scored 88% of his victories via knockout.

== Amateur career ==
Kirkland has an amateur record of 134–12 and won the Silver Gloves championship four years in a row and lost on a controversial decision to James Patterson in the finals of the National Golden Gloves.

Instead of going to the Olympics, Kirkland turned professional to provide for his family.

== Professional career ==
Kirkland turned professional in August 2001 in San Antonio, Texas. In his debut Kirkland defeated fellow debutant Maurice Chalmers with a third-round knockout. Kirkland has been trained by former women's champion Ann Wolfe since 2001. On November 22, 2008, Kirkland (24–0, 21 KOs) won an 8th round technical knockout versus Brian Vera (16–2, 10 KOs). Kirkland dropped Vera twice in Round 2. On March 7, 2009, Kirkland defeated Joel Julio on HBO's Boxing After Dark at the HP Pavilion in San Jose by TKO after Round 6.

=== Return to boxing ===
On March 5, 2011, Kirkland returned to the ring after an almost 2-year layoff to defeat Ahsandi Gibbs via first-round KO. Two weeks later he stopped Jhon Berrio by 2nd round TKO. Just 3 weeks after that, on April 9, 2011, Kirkland faced Nobuhiro Ishida of Japan, in what was supposed to be a stay-busy fight for Kirkland. However, in a stunning upset, the previously undefeated Kirkland was stopped in the first round by the Japanese fighter, who isn't known for being a big puncher having only 7 KO's in 29 fights, getting knocked down 3 times. After the loss, Kirkland split with trainer Kenny Adams and reunited with Ann Wolfe. Kirkland and Wolfe had broken up after Kirkland went to prison.

Kirkland came back from his first-round knockout loss to score three knockdowns over Alexis Hloros en route to a second-round knockout. He entered the fight his usual aggression, looking to mix it up immediately and scored two knockdowns in the opening round. First, Hloros went down during a flurry and then he took a knee during another stream of punches.

==== Kirkland vs. Angulo ====
On November 5, 2011, in a highly exciting fight, Kirkland rose from a first round knockdown to defeat Angulo via 6th-round TKO.

In addition to his aforementioned victories over Angulo, Kirkland's other notable wins have been against Brian Vera (TKO8), who just lost a controversial decision to Julio César Chávez Jr., Joel Julio (TKO6) and Eromosele Albert (TKO1).

On October 16, 2013, it was announced that Kirkland, has signed with promoter/rap star 50 Cent and his company SMS Promotions and has his next fight lined up.

On December 7, 2013, Kirkland continued his winning ways with a sixth-round TKO of 23-year-old prospect Glen Tapia at the Boardwalk Hall in Atlantic City. In the article, Kirkland was described as 'potentially, the most dominant offensive force in boxing since a prime Mike Tyson'.

==== Kirkland vs. Álvarez ====
Kirkland fought former Super Welterweight Champion Canelo Álvarez after the latter's decision victory over Erislandy Lara on July 12. The fight took place on May 9 at Minute Maid Park in Houston, Texas with Kirkland losing by KO in 3rd round.

== Outside of boxing ==
As of 2009, Kirkland was on probation for an armed robbery conviction in 2003, for which he spent 30 months in prison.

On Sunday, April 19, 2009, Kirkland was stopped in Austin traffic and arrested for possession of a firearm by a felon. On Wednesday, September 23, 2009, Kirkland was sentenced to 24 months in prison after pleading guilty to the firearm charge. Kirkland was released from prison in September 2010 and spent several more months in a halfway house in Austin, Texas.

In June 2013, Kirkland was arrested for assault causing bodily injury and family violence. In 2016 he was again arrested, this time for failing to pay child support.

== Professional boxing record ==
37 fights	34 wins	3 losses
By knockout	30	3
By decision	3	0
By disqualification	1	0

No.	Result	Record	Opponent	Type	Round, time	Date	Location	Notes
37	Loss	34–3	Juan Macias Montiel	KO	1 (10), 1:56	Dec 26, 2020	Shrine Exposition Center, Los Angeles, California, U.S.	
36	Win	34–2	Jas Phipps	TKO	2 (6), 3:00	Nov 9, 2019	Alamodome, San Antonio, Texas, U.S.	
35	Win	33–2	Colby Courter	TKO	1 (6), 2:15	Aug 24, 2019	Frank Erwin Center, Austin, Texas, U.S.	
34	Loss	32–2	Canelo Álvarez	KO	3 (12), 2:19	May 9, 2015	Minute Maid Park, Houston, Texas, U.S.	
33	Win	32–1	Glen Tapia	KO	6 (10), 0:38	Dec 7, 2013	Boardwalk Hall, Atlantic City, New Jersey, U.S.	
32	Win	31–1	Carlos Molina	DQ	10 (12), 3:00	Mar 24, 2012	Reliant Arena, Houston, Texas, U.S.	Retained WBC Continental Americas light middleweight title; Molina disqualified after his cornermen entered the ring too early
31	Win	30–1	Alfredo Angulo	TKO	6 (12), 1:58	Nov 5, 2011	Centro, Cancún, Mexico	Won WBC Continental Americas light middleweight title
30	Win	29–1	Alexis Hloros	TKO	2 (8), 0:25	Jul 23, 2011	Mandalay Bay Events Center, Paradise, Nevada, U.S.	
29	Win	28–1	Dennis Sharpe	KO	1 (8), 2:18	Jun 24, 2011	Dr Pepper Arena, Frisco, Texas, U.S.	
28	Loss	27–1	Nobuhiro Ishida	TKO	1 (8), 1:52	Apr 9, 2011	MGM Grand Garden Arena, Paradise, Nevada, U.S.	
27	Win	27–0	Jhon Berrio	KO	2 (8), 1:02	Mar 18, 2011	Orange County Fair, Costa Mesa, California, U.S.	
26	Win	26–0	Ahsandi Gibbs	KO	1 (8), 0:34	Mar 5, 2011	Honda Center, Anaheim, California, U.S.	
25	Win	25–0	Joel Julio	TKO	6 (10), 3:00	Mar 7, 2009	HP Pavilion, San Jose, California, U.S.	
24	Win	24–0	Brian Vera	TKO	8 (10), 1:45	Nov 22, 2008	MGM Grand Garden Arena, Paradise, Nevada, U.S.	
23	Win	23–0	Ricardo Cortes	TKO	2 (10), 1:59	Sep 5, 2008	Music Hall, Austin, Texas, U.S.	
22	Win	22–0	Eromosele Albert	TKO	1 (10), 1:06	May 17, 2008	Star of the Desert Arena, Primm, Nevada, U.S.	Won vacant NABO light middleweight title
21	Win	21–0	Allen Conyers	TKO	1 (10), 2:56	Nov 30, 2007	Chumash Casino Resort, Santa Ynez, California, U.S.	
20	Win	20–0	Mohammad Said Salem	KO	2 (10), 2:32	Sep 1, 2007	Emerald Queen Casino, Tacoma, Washington, U.S.	
19	Win	19–0	Ossie Duran	UD	10	Jun 1, 2007	Chumash Casino Resort, Santa Ynez, California, U.S.	
18	Win	18–0	Billy Lyell	TKO	8 (10), 0:34	Feb 2, 2007	Chumash Casino Resort, Santa Ynez, California, U.S.	
17	Win	17–0	David Toribio	KO	4 (8), 1:35	Dec 1, 2006	Chumash Casino Resort, Santa Ynez, California, U.S.	
16	Win	16–0	Sherwin Davis	RTD	2 (8), 3:00	Oct 6, 2006	Chumash Casino Resort, Santa Ynez, California, U.S.	
15	Win	15–0	Alexis Division	RTD	3 (8), 3:00	Jul 28, 2006	Pureformance Training Center, Paradise, Nevada, U.S.	
14	Win	14–0	Ray Cuningham	TKO	1 (6), 2:16	Jun 3, 2006	Thomas & Mack Center, Paradise, Nevada, U.S.	
13	Win	13–0	David Estrada	TKO	3 (6), 1:05	May 5, 2006	Lucky Star Casino, Concho, Oklahoma, U.S.	
12	Win	12–0	Manny Castillo	TKO	3 (6), 2:37	Apr 21, 2006	Omar Shrine Temple, Mount Pleasant, South Carolina, U.S.	
11	Win	11–0	Russell Jordan	TKO	1 (8)	Nov 6, 2003	Hilton, Washington, D.C., U.S.	
10	Win	10–0	Martinus Clay	KO	1 (4), 0:54	Aug 22, 2003	Silver Star Hotel and Casino, Choctaw, Mississippi, U.S.	
9	Win	9–0	Sergio Soto	KO	3 (4), 0:54	May 23, 2003	Lucky Star Casino, Concho, Oklahoma, U.S.	
8	Win	8–0	Rodney Tappin	UD	4	Mar 15, 2003	Club Life, Dallas, Texas, U.S.	
7	Win	7–0	Juan Carlos Aranday	TKO	3 (6), 0:35	Jan 31, 2003	Randy's Ballroom, San Antonio, Texas, U.S.	
6	Win	6–0	Edgar Pedraza	UD	4	Oct 11, 2002	Freeman Coliseum, San Antonio, Texas, U.S.	
5	Win	5–0	Rashaan Abdul Blackburn	TKO	3 (4)	Sep 12, 2002	Nation, Washington, D.C., U.S.	
4	Win	4–0	Jose Luis Rodrigues	TKO	1 (4), 1:35	Jul 13, 2002	The Aladdin, Paradise, Nevada, U.S.	
3	Win	3–0	Maurice Chalmers	TKO	3 (4), 2:20	Dec 9, 2001	Crockett Center, Austin, Texas, U.S.	
2	Win	2–0	Juan Jaime Rodriguez	KO	1 (4), 0:46	Oct 26, 2001	Frank Erwin Center, Austin, Texas, U.S.	
1	Win	1–0	Maurice Chalmers	TKO	3 (4), 1:49	Aug 25, 2001	Sunset Station, San Antonio, Texas, U.S.	

Sporting positions
Regional boxing titles
Vacant Title last held by Charles Whittaker	NABO light middleweight champion May 17, 2008 – November 2008; Vacated	Vacant Title next held by Danny Perez Ramírez
Preceded by Alfredo Angulo	WBC Continental Americas light middleweight champion November 5, 2011 – January 2013; Vacated	Vacant Title next held by Jermell Charlo
