= Canelo Álvarez vs. James Kirkland =

2015 boxing match

- Date: May 9, 2015
- Venue: Minute Maid Park, Houston, Texas, U.S.

Tale of the tape
Boxer	Canelo Álvarez	James Kirkland
Nickname	"Canelo"	"Mandingo Warrior"
Hometown	Guadalajara, Jalisco, Mexico	San Antonio, Texas, U.S.
Purse	>$3,500,000	$1,300,000
Pre-fight record	44–1–1 (29 KO)	32–1 (28 KO)
Age	24 years, 9 months	31 years, 1 month
Height	5 ft 8 in (173 cm)	5 ft 9 in (175 cm)
Weight	154 1/2 lb (70 kg)	154 1/2 lb (70 kg)
Style	Orthodox	Southpaw
Recognition	WBA/WBC/The Ring/TBRB; No. 1 Ranked Light middleweight Former unified light middleweight champion	Former NABO Light middleweight champion

Result
- Álvarez wins by 3rd-round KO

Canelo Álvarez vs. James Kirkland was a professional boxing match contested on May 9, 2015.

== Background ==
Canelo Álvarez, who was coming off a unanimous decision victory over Erislandy Lara in July 2014, had been looking for a new opponent to fight. His team had been negotiating with several potential opponents, including Miguel Cotto, but the talks had fallen through. Ultimately, the decision was made to face James Kirkland, who had been considered a dangerous opponent due to his punching power.

In March, at the official press conference, the fight was announced to take place at Minute Maid Park in Houston, Texas on 9 May, live on HBO, a week after the 2 May fight between Mayweather and Pacquiao. It marked the first fight of Álvarez's lucrative HBO contract.

== The fight ==
Kirkland came out aggressively, but Álvarez wobbled him and scored a knockdown via straight right hand in round one. In the third round, a counter right uppercut sent Kirkland to the canvas. Álvarez ended the fight with a jab to the body quickly followed by the right hand, creating the KO. Álvarez landed 87 of 150 punches thrown (58%) and Kirkland landed 42 of 197 (21%).

== Aftermath ==
After the bout, Kirkland said, "I did not know I was knocked out." He was then taken to hospital to undergo a CT scan.

The fight drew an average of 2.146 million viewers on HBO and peaked at 2.296 million, the highest viewership for HBO in 2015.

== Undercard ==
Confirmed bouts:

== Broadcasting ==
Country	Broadcaster
Australia	Main Event
Hungary	Sport 1
Latin America	Canal Space
Mexico	Azteca
Panama	RPC
Russia	BoxingTV
United Kingdom	BoxNation
United States	HBO

Preceded by vs. Erislandy Lara	Canelo Álvarez's bouts 9 May 2015	Succeeded by vs. Miguel Cotto
Preceded by vs. Glen Tapia	James Kirkland's bouts 9 May 2015	Succeeded by vs. Colby Courter
Awards
Previous: Carl Froch vs. George Groves II	The Ring Knockout of the Year; 2015	Next: Canelo Álvarez vs. Amir Khan
