= Canelo Álvarez vs. Liam Smith =

Boxing match

- Date: September 17, 2016
- Venue: AT&T Stadium, Arlington, Texas, U.S.
- Title(s) on the line: WBO light middleweight championship

Tale of the tape
Boxer	Liam Smith	Saúl Álvarez
Nickname	"Beefy"	"Canelo"
Hometown	Liverpool, Merseyside, UK	Guadalajara, Jalisco, Mexico
Purse	$2,000,000	$5,000,000
Pre-fight record	23–0–1 (13 KO)	47–1–1 (33 KO)
Age	28 years, 1 month	26 years, 1 month
Height	5 ft 9 1/2 in (177 cm)	5 ft 8 in (173 cm)
Weight	154 lb (70 kg)	154 lb (70 kg)
Style	Orthodox	Orthodox
Recognition	WBO; Light Middleweight Champion; The Ring/TBRB; No. 8 Ranked Light Middleweight	The Ring and TBRB; Middleweight Champion; WBO; No. 1 Ranked Light Middleweight; The Ring No. 8 ranked pound-for-pound fighter 2-division world champion

Result
- Álvarez defeats Smith via 9th round TKO

Canelo Álvarez vs. Liam Smith was a professional boxing match contested on September 17, 2016, for the WBO light middleweight championship.

== Background ==
Shortly after his victory for Amir Khan, Canelo Álvarez and his team invited fellow middleweight champion Gennady Golovkin into the ring to promote a future fight between them. During the post-fight interview with HBO's Max Kellerman, Álvarez stated, "Let's fight now." 11 days later however, on 18 May 2016, Álvarez vacated his WBC title which was immediately awarded to Gennady Golovkin.

On 24 June, it was announced that Álvarez was to drop back to 154 and challenge 27 year old WBO champion Liam Smith on 17 September, in the main event of HBO PPV card. On 18 July, Golden Boy Promotions confirmed that the bout would take place at AT&T Stadium in Arlington, Texas, with the MGM Grand in Las Vegas being the other venue in contention to host the fight. Having fought his last five fights at his preferred 155-pound catchweight, Canelo said, "I am very pleased to announce my next fight against Liam Smith, a tremendous fighter with real knockout power, and the WBO light middleweight world title owner, I have no doubt that this fight will be give and take, which will fill the expectations of the fans, and I will work with all the enthusiasm as I always do to get the upper hand on Sept. 17."

== The fight ==
In front of a record breaking crowd of 51,240, Álvarez would largely control the bout, dropping the champion in the 7th and 8th round. A left hook to the body in round nine sent Smith down again and he failed to beat to count, giving Álvarez a knockout victory. Álvarez landed 157 punches from 422 thrown a connect rate of 37%, compared to Smith landing 115 from 403 thrown, a connect rate of 29%.

== Aftermath ==
The fight drew an estimate of 300,000 PPV buys.

Golden Boy president Eric Gomez spoke to Ring magazine in December, stating that Álvarez had no immediate plans to vacate the WBO title and may fight in the first quarter of 2017 at 154, defending his world title. He also stated that there were still plans for Álvarez to fight Golovkin later in the year.

== Undercard ==
Confirmed bouts:

Weight Class	Weight		vs.		Method	Round	Time	Notes
Light middleweight	154 lbs.	(Mexico) Canelo Álvarez	def.	(United Kingdom) Liam Smith (c)	KO	9/12	2:28	^{Note 1}
Middleweight	160 lbs.	(United States) Willie Monroe Jr.	def.	(United States) Gabriel Rosado	UD	12		^{Note 2}
Featherweight	126 lbs.	(United States) Joseph Diaz (c)	def.	(United States) Andrew Cancio	TKO	9/10	2:27	^{Note 3}
Super bantamweight	122 lbs.	(Mexico) Diego de la Hoya	def.	(Puerto Rico) Luis Orlando Del Valle	UD	10
Preliminary Card
Welterweight	147 lbs.	(United States) Sadam Ali	def.	(Mexico) Saul Corral	UD	10
Light welterweight	140 lbs.	(United States) Vergil Ortiz Jr.	def.	(United States) Ernesto Hernandez	KO	1/4	0:40
Lightweight	135 lbs.	(United States) Hector Tanajara Jr.	def.	(United States) Roy Garcia	UD	4
Bantamweight	118 lbs.	(United States) Joshua Franco	def.	(Mexico) Bryan Bazan	KO	4/6	0:19
Light welterweight	140 lbs.	(Puerto Rico) Zachary Ochoa	def.	(Mexico) Daniel Montoya	UD	8
Light middleweight	150 lbs.	(Mexico) Alexis Salazar Flores	def.	(United States) Larry Smith	UD	6
Cruiserweight	200 lbs.	(United Kingdom) Anthony Yarde	def.	(United States) Rayford Johnson	TKO	1/6	2:10

^Note 1 For WBO Light middleweight title
^Note 2 For vacant WBO Inter-Continental Middleweight title
^Note 3 For NABF Featherweight title

== Broadcasting ==
Country	Broadcaster
Australia	Main Event
Latin America	Canal Space
Panama	RPC
United Kingdom	BoxNation
United States	HBO

Preceded by vs. Amir Khan	Canelo Álvarez's bouts 17 September 2016	Succeeded by vs. Julio César Chávez Jr.
Preceded by vs. Predrag Radošević	Liam Smith's bouts 17 September 2016	Succeeded by vs. Marian Cazacu
