= Canelo Álvarez vs. Amir Khan =

2016 professional boxing match

- Date: May 7, 2016
- Venue: T-Mobile Arena; Paradise, Nevada, United States
- Title(s) on the line: WBC, The Ring and TBRB middleweight titles

Tale of the tape
Boxer	Saúl Álvarez	Amir Khan
Nickname	Canelo ("Cinnamon")	King
Hometown	Guadalajara, Jalisco, Mexico	Bolton, Greater Manchester, UK
Purse	$3,000,000	$2,000,000
Pre-fight record	46–1–1 (32 KO)	31–3 (19 KO)
Age	25 years, 9 months	29 years, 4 months
Height	5 ft 8 in (173 cm)	5 ft 8 1/2 in (174 cm)
Weight	155 lb (70 kg)	155 lb (70 kg)
Style	Orthodox	Orthodox
Recognition	WBC, The Ring and TBRB; Middleweight Champion; The Ring No. 7 ranked pound-for-pound fighter 2-division world champion	WBC; No. 1 Ranked Welterweight; The Ring; No. 2 Ranked Welterweight; TBRB; No. 3 Ranked Welterweight; Former unified light welterweight champion

Result
- Álvarez wins via 6th-round KO

Canelo Álvarez vs. Amir Khan was a professional boxing match contested on May 7, 2016, for the WBC, The Ring magazine and lineal championship. It was the first major sporting event to be held at the T-Mobile Arena in Las Vegas. The fight was won by Álvarez, who scored a sixth-round knockout of Khan to retain his titles.

== Background ==
This fight was Canelo Álvarez's first defense as the WBC and The Ring middleweight champion, and Amir Khan's first fight at middleweight after moving up two weight divisions from welterweight. A catchweight of 155 lb was in effect, at which Álvarez had fought for his previous four fights.

The UK broadcasting rights were awarded to BoxNation, exclusively. It was also shown by Fathom Events at nearly 200 select movie theatres across the United States.

=== Press conferences ===
The fight had international press conferences in three cities:

- February 29, 2016 — Park Plaza Riverbank, London, UK
- March 1, 2016 — Hard Rock Cafe, New York City, New York, US
- March 2, 2016 — Five Towers Stage, Los Angeles, California, US

== Build up ==
On 2 February 2016, Golden Boy Promotions officially announced that Canelo Álvarez and Khan had reached an agreement to compete for Álvarez’s WBC and Ring Magazine middleweight titles. The bout was scheduled for 7 May, at a catchweight of 155 pounds, planned to headline an HBO pay-per-view event during the Cinco de Mayo weekend. Álvarez was committed to challenging elite opponents and acknowledged Khan’s credentials as both a decorated amateur and a two-time world champion. For Khan, the opportunity was meaningful, after struggling to secure high-profile bouts. Khan was confident that his speed and skill set would pose difficulties for Álvarez, even moving up in weight. Despite a history of tension between Golden Boy Promotions and Khan’s adviser, Al Haymon, negotiations were conducted directly with Khan’s team, and successfully arranged. Both fighters entered the fight on impressive winning streaks: Álvarez had four consecutive victories following his loss to Floyd Mayweather, while Khan had achieved five straight wins since moving up to welterweight. The event was planned for the newly constructed T-Mobile Arena in Las Vegas, which had yet to host a boxing event. Golden Boy Promotions managed to successfully keep the details of the fight private despite the prevalence of social media leaks. De La Hoya noted that it was uncommon to maintain such confidentiality, stating his surprise that the announcement stayed under wraps for several weeks. On February 4, the Nevada State Athletic Commission unanimously approved the bout for May 7 at the T-Mobile Arena. The contest was scheduled as the first boxing event at the newly opened venue.

Despite Canelo's size and strength advantage, Khan was confident in his ability to secure a win, stating while a win over Canelo would hold greater significance than Mayweather's victory in 2013. Khan viewed it as a chance to reinforce his standing among the elite fighters globally. He studied Mayweather's strategy, which successfully mitigated Canelo's physical advantages through movement and defense. Khan was aware that Canelo would have gained additional experience and strength since that fight but maintained that his own speed and footwork would be crucial. Khan and his father, Shah, stated that a proposed fight with Kell Brook was set aside in favor of a bout with Álvarez due to timing and greater opportunity. Khan said Brook’s team moved forward with another fight (with Kevin Bizier), allowing him to pursue Álvarez, which he described as a “massive opportunity.” Shah Khan added that a Brook fight could take place at a later date, while a fight with Álvarez represented a unique opportunity, and rejected suggestions that Khan had avoided Brook.

=== Weight & rehydration clause ===
It was reported that the bout would be contested at a 155-pound catchweight without a rehydration clause. This allowed both fighters to regain unlimited weight after the weigh-in, despite concerns over size differences. Eric Gomez stated that Álvarez was naturally a super welterweight competing above his usual division due to title requirements. Khan chose not to insist on a clause, saying, “I wanted to do everything naturally... I want to beat him fair and square.” Eddie Hearn said, “There’s no rehydration clause, which is mad.” Canelo was likely to likely gain between 15–25 pounds after weigh-in.

Álvarez stated that the weight was necessary because the title could not be defended at 154 pounds and that Khan had wanted the championship at stake.

“We wanted to defend the title… we could not do it at 154… that is why we agreed to do it at that weight.”

— Canelo Álvarez

“We made it at 155 because Khan wanted to fight for my middleweight title.”

— Canelo Álvarez

“I didn’t want to eat myself up to that weight. I wanted to train my way up to 155.”

— Amir Khan

Khan, moving up from welterweight, indicated that the higher weight suited him, claiming he would not be weakened by weight-cutting and could perform without being drained. There was some contradiction when Khan spoke to Fighthype.com, he said, "They told me it’s only going to happen at 155.” Khan tried to negotiate the fight at a lower weight between 152 and 154 pounds, but was ultimately told it would be 155 or no fight.

Khan was open to competing at middleweight following this bout, although he maintained that welterweight remained his natural division. Khan stated that fighting at a higher weight could improve his performance by reducing the effects of weight cutting, but was also confident in returning to 147 pounds, if he wanted. The WBC confirmed that if Khan won the middleweight title, he would have the option to either defend it against mandatory challenger Gennady Golovkin at 160 pounds or return to welterweight to challenge Danny Garcia. Golovkin’s team, however, stated that any potential bout would take place at the full middleweight limit with no catchweight agreement.

=== Reaction ===
In the lead‑up to the fight, a range of boxers and analysts offered differing predictions. Former world champion Carl Froch stated that Khan could “pull off an even bigger shock and win,” citing his speed and movement as key factors. Khan himself was confident that he would “make history” by defeating Álvarez. In contrast, former four-division champion Erik Morales predicted that Khan would not last more than four rounds, mentioning the size disparity and his perceived vulnerability to punches. A poll of British boxing figures found that most expected Álvarez to win, often by late stoppage, although some suggested Khan could enjoy early success due to his speed before being overwhelmed.

== Officials ==
The Nevada State Athletic Commission approved the officiating team for the championship bout. Kenny Bayless was appointed referee, with Adalaide Byrd, Glenn Trowbridge and Glenn Feldman selected as judges. Bayless was to earn $4,150 for the bout, while all three judges earned $2,950 each. None of the selected officials worked Álvarez’s previous fight with Miguel Cotto. Bayless had previously refereed Álvarez’s loss to Floyd Mayweather in 2013. Trowbridge had prior experience scoring fights involving both fighters, including Khan’s close win over Marcos Maidana and Álvarez’s bout against Shane Mosley.

Judges
Adalaide Byrd	Nevada
Glenn Trowbridge	Nevada
Glenn Feldman	Connectictut
Referee
Kenny Bayless	California

== Weigh in ==
The weigh-in took place in front of a large crowd at the Toshiba Plaza outside the T-Mobile Arena. Legends Roberto Durán, Lennox Lewis and Evander Holyfield where featured attendees. The contracted catchweight was set at 155 pounds. Both Álvarez and Khan weighed in at the exact limit. Immediately after weighing in, Álvarez said, “I feel great making the weight… I know I'm fighting a fast fighter with a lot of experience.” Khan said, “It's a big challenge… I'm up against a great fighter. I am focused and 100 percent confident I can go in there and win it.”

=== Undercard weigh‑in results ===
- David Lemieux — 160 lbs vs. Glen Tapia — 159.5 lbs
- Frankie Gomez — 146 lbs vs. Mauricio Herrera — 145.5 lbs (catchweight)
- Patrick Teixeira — 159 lbs vs. Curtis Stevens — 160 lbs

== Fight details ==
Álvarez defeated Khan via 6th‑round knockout. Khan began the fight strongly, using superior hand speed and footwork to outbox Álvarez in the early rounds. However, Álvarez gradually gained control by pressuring Khan and targeting the body. In the sixth round, Álvarez landed a decisive right hand to the chin, knocking Khan unconscious and prompting the referee to stop the fight at 2:37.

=== Round by round ===
Round 1

Khan tossed out several jabs to open the fight, but failed to connect. A hard right cross to the head snapped Álvarez's head back, but appeared largely unaffected. Álvarez responded with a right to the ribs, and Khan responded with a flurry of jabs and a right to the head. Álvarez missed with a powerful right hook, but Khan was out of position to counter. Khan walked into a short left hook just as his own left missed, but did not appear hurt. Khan blocked Álvarez's left hook with a minute left. Khan opened up with a flurry of three punches to the head, all of which missed. Khan maintained a high tempo for the remainder of the round.

Round 2

Álvarez stormed out of his corner, but missed with a sweeping left-right upstairs. Álvarez missed another hard right hook, causing him to stumble and Khan countered with a quick shot. Álvarez remained aggressive, walking after his opponent and throwing digs to the body. Both fighters missed during an exchange in the center of the ring before settling in with jabs. Khan landed a right-left up top but Álvarez walked through it. Khan threw four jabs to the head and body. With 10 seconds left, Álvarez swallowed a slick left-right, giving Khan the round.

Round 3

Khan remained mobile, forcing Álvarez to lunge in and miss many early shots. Khan got hit with a short left, but was left unfazed. Khan threw a hard left-right followed by a pair of jabs, then landed a sweeping left hook to the head. Álvarez did not appear hurt by the shots, but their speed appeared to be giving him issues. Khan remained just out of reach of another hard left hook from Álvarez. Khan threw a multi-punch flurry to the face, but Álvarez continued to walk through the attacks. Álvarez threw a hard right to the body, but Khan quickly countered upstairs with a forceful right and then a short left.

Round 4

A hard right to the face by Khan caught Álvarez off guard, and the fighters clinched. In the grip, Álvarez slammed a left to the ribs, forcing Khan to back off. Khan landed another right, but Álvarez landed a right of his own to the body. Khan landed a triple jab to Álvarez. Álvarez missed a right, and was subsequently cracked by a forceful overhand left. Nevertheless, he did not appear to be dazed. Khan missed a powerful right-left to the head as Álvarez turned with both shots. Álvarez's right eye began to swell late in the round. Álvarez slammed another right to the body as the round came to a close.

Round 5

Álvarez threw a short left to the head early, but Khan shook it off. Álvarez moved fervently, making Álvarez chase after him. Álvarez landed a right to the body, but was quickly countered by a left up top. Álvarez threw some jabs after taking a shot to the ribs a minute into the round. Álvarez caught Khan with a right, but Khan partially blocked it against the ropes. Khan landed a jab then ducked under a left hook, but Álvarez was out of position to land. Álvarez threw a three-punch combo, but missed during an exchange at the bell.

Round 6

Both fighters took turns missing meagre jabs early before Khan landed an errant left hook to Álvarez's ear. Álvarez returned fire with a right to the hip. Álvarez answered Khan's jab with a left hook. Khan appeared slightly dazed, and the fight changed pace, with Álvarez taking control. With a loss in manoeuvrability, Khan sought to establish a buffer zone with jabs. Álvarez used the opportunity to land a couple of body shots to Khan, slowing his movement. Khan's head seemed to be clearing, but he had not regained the body movement which protected him so well earlier in the bout. Álvarez feinted a body jab as a cover to load a right hook, but Khan parried the jab with both hands. The jab was withdrawn and Khan was left off balance with both hands down. Álvarez feinted another jab and landed an overhand right, dropping Khan unconscious. Bayless did not count as the ringside staff, including doctors, stormed the ring.

=== Post-fight ===
During the post‑fight, when asked about the frustrating start and how he managed to change momentum, Álvarez said, “He is a fast fighter, and I knew things would be complicated in beginning .. But I knew they would come to my favor as the fight went on. People have known me only for my power. I have many more qualities in the ring and I showed that.”

Khan urged Álvarez to face unified middleweight titleholder Gennady Golovkin, stating that it was “time for Canelo to step up” and meet the division’s leading contender. Khan was positive on his own performance, noting that he had trained hard and taken a significant risk by moving up in weight. He acknowledged that he was “naturally a lighter fighter” and intended to return to the welterweight division. He wanted to challenge elite opponents, adding that “to be the best I have to fight the best.”

Álvarez turned his attention to a potential unification bout with Golovkin, who was present at ringside as the WBC interim champion and mandatory challenger. Álvarez invited Golovkin into the ring after the fight and stated that he was willing to face any opponent, declaring that he “fear[ed] no one in this sport.”

=== Analysis ===
Alvarez was ahead on two scorecards, 49–46 and 48–47. Khan was ahead 48–47 on the third scorecard. ESPN.com had Khan ahead 48–47.

Punch Stats
Punches	Alvarez	Khan
Landed	64	48
Thrown	170	166
Percent	38%	29%

== Aftermath ==
Khan admitted the size disparity was decisive, but accepted responsibility for taking the fight. He believed he was ahead in the fight before the knockout and disagreed with official judges’ scorecards. He preferred a knockout loss over a controversial decision defeat. He said, “In a way I’m glad I got knocked out rather than… got cheated at the end of it.” He stated the KO as something he could accept, arguing that long fights with sustained punishment are more harmful in the long term long-term.

In October 2016, following a period of inactivity due to hand surgery, Khan stated that he intended to return to the welterweight division the following summer. He identified potential comeback opponents as Kell Brook and Danny Garcia, describing a bout with Brook as "the biggest fight remaining" in his career, while also wanting to stage the contest in the United Kingdom.

== Reception ==
The fight produced $7,417,350 from the live gate, according to figures released by the Nevada State Athletic Commission. This came from 13,072 sold tickets. The gross made it the 34th highest grossing boxing event in Nevada history. On pay-per-view, the fight sold an estimated 600,000 PPV buys, but HBO and Golden Boy promotions refused to release the official totals. The fight grossed at least $35,994,000 in pay-per-view revenue, giving the event a combined live-gate and pay-per-view revenue of at least $43,411,350.

In addition to 600,000 PPV buys, the fight drew a replay audience of 1.005 million viewers on HBO, giving a total audience of 1.605 million viewers on HBO. In Mexico, the fight drew a live audience of 3.3 million viewers on Azteca 7, making it the year's fourth most-watched live sporting event in Mexico up until May 2016. The fight drew a total audience of 15.4 million viewers on TV Azteca in Mexico. Combined, the fight had a total of 17.005 million viewers in the United States and Mexico.

Álvarez's potential earnings from the fight was about $15-20 million. Amir Khan's earnings from the fight was an estimated $13.1 million (£9 million), the highest for a British boxer since Wladimir Klitschko vs. David Haye in 2011.

== Fight purses ==
Guaranteed Base Purses

- Canelo Álvarez ($3,000,000) vs. Amir Khan ($2,000,000)
- David Lemieux ($200,000) vs. Glen Tapia ($150,000)
- Mauricio Herrera ($175,000) vs. Frankie Gomez ($90,000)
- Curtis Stevens ($65,000) vs. Patrick Teixeira ($50,000)

== Fight card ==
The fight card included the following fights:

Weight Class	Weight		vs.		Method	Round	Time	Notes
Middleweight	155 lbs.	(Mexico) Canelo Álvarez (c)	def.	(United Kingdom) Amir Khan	KO	6/12	2:37	^{Note 1}
Middleweight	160 lbs.	(Canada) David Lemieux	def.	(United States) Glen Tapia	TKO	4/10	0:56	^{Note 2}
Welterweight	147 lbs.	(United States) Frankie Gómez	def.	(United States) Mauricio Herrera	UD	10
Middleweight	160 lbs.	(United States) Curtis Stevens	def.	(Brazil) Patrick Teixeira	TKO	2/10	1:04	^{Note 3}
Preliminary Card
Super bantamweight	122 lbs.	(Mexico) Diego de la Hoya	def.	(United States) Rocco Santomauro	TKO	7/8	1:59
Middleweight	160 lbs.	(Republic of Ireland) Jason Quigley	def.	(Mexico) James de la Rosa	UD	10
Lightweight	135 lbs.	(United States) Lamont Roach Jr.	def.	(Mexico) Jose Arturo Esquivel	UD	8
Light middleweight	154 lbs.	(United States) Rashidi Ellis	def.	(Mexico) Marco Antonio López	UD	8
Light welterweight	140 lbs.	(United States) David Mijares	def.	(United States) Omar Reyes	UD	4

^Note 1 For WBC and The Ring middleweight titles
^Note 2 For vacant NABO middleweight title.
^Note 3 For vacant WBC Continental Americas middleweight title.

== International broadcasting ==
Country	Broadcaster
Australia	Main Event
Canada	Shaw PPV; Dish PPV; Sportsnet PPV
Czech Republic	Sport 1
France	BeIN Sport
Germany	Sky Select
Hungary	Sport 2
Indonesia	tvOne
Italy	Sportitalia
Latin America	Space
Malaysia	Astro
Mexico	Azteca 7
New Zealand	Sky
Pakistan	PTV Sports
Philippines	Solar Sports, TV5 and AksyonTV
Poland	Polsat Sport
Portugal	Sport TV
Romania	Sport.ro
Qatar	BeIN Sports
Russia	NTV Plus
Turkey	NTV Spor
Spain	Taquilla
United Arab Emirates	DU TV
United Kingdom	BoxNation
United States	HBO PPV; Dish PPV

Preceded by vs. Miguel Cotto	Canelo Álvarez's bouts May 6, 2016	Succeeded by vs. Liam Smith
Preceded by vs. Chris Algieri	Amir Khan's bouts May 7, 2016	Succeeded by vs. Phil Lo Greco
Awards
Previous: Canelo Álvarez vs. James Kirkland	The Ring Knockout of the Year; 2016	Next: David Lemieux vs. Curtis Stevens
