= Canelo Álvarez vs. Matthew Hatton =

2011 boxing match

Here's Your Shot
- Date: March 5, 2011
- Venue: Honda Center, Anaheim, California, U.S.
- Title(s) on the line: vacant WBC super welterweight title

Tale of the tape
Boxer	Saúl Álvarez	Matthew Hatton
Nickname	Canelo ("Cinnamon")	Magic
Hometown	Tlajomulco de Zúñiga, Jalisco, Mexico	Stockport, Greater Manchester, U.K.
Purse	$350,000	$150,000
Pre-fight record	35–0–1 (26 KO)	41–4–2 (16 KO)
Age	20 years, 7 months	29 years, 9 months
Height	5 ft 8 in (173 cm)	5 ft 8 in (173 cm)
Weight	151 3/4 lb (69 kg)	149 1/2 lb (68 kg)
Style	Orthodox	Orthodox
Recognition	WBC; No. 1 Ranked Super Welterweight; The Ring; No. 10 Ranked Light Middleweight; WBC Silver super welterweight champion	WBC; No. 5 Ranked Welterweight; European welterweight champion

Result
- Álvarez wins via 12-round unanimous decision (119–108, 119–108, 119–108)

Canelo Álvarez vs. Matthew Hatton, billed as Here's Your Shot, was a professional boxing match contested on March 5, 2011, for the WBC super welterweight championship.

== Background ==
Having held the WBC Silver since his July 2010 victory over Luciano Leonel Cuello, Canelo Álvarez was the mandatory challenger for the WBC light middleweight belt which was won by Manny Pacquiao in November 2010.

In January 2011 Álvarez signed to face European welterweight champion Matthew Hatton at a 150 Ib catchweight.

In February 2011 the WBC Board of Governors voted to declare their super welterweight title vacant, following Pacquiao informing them that he had no intention of defending the belt. As a result, the Álvarez/Hatton bout was sanctioned for the now vacant title despite still being fought 4 pounds below the Light middleweight limit and with Hatton being unranked at the weight. It was the first time for either fighter to challenge for a major belt in any division. Álvarez was a 15–1 on favourite to win.

=== Reported fight earnings ===
These are the payouts to some of the fighters. These are the California State Athletic Commission purses as per the California bout agreements. They do not include sponsor money or other common forms of revenue paid through other streams. In California, if a fighter is more than two pounds overweight he is automatically penalized 20 percent of his purse.

- Canelo Álvarez $350,000 vs. Matthew Hatton $150,000

The fine stood against Canelo Álvarez, who weighed in at 151.8 pounds and forfeited $70,000 of his $350,000 purse. The Hatton camp asked Alvarez to try to lose the weight, which he agreed to do after a "spirited discussion". When he came back to the scale about an hour later, he failed to make the limit of 150, weighing in at 151.4 on the scale.

== The fight ==
Alvarez dominated to win the vacant WBC 154-pound belt, to win his first world title.

Alvarez picked apart Hatton from the opening bell, peppering the smaller man with head shots and using his brute power. Hatton twice went to the canvas after getting hit out of a break with Alvarez, but wasn't seriously hurt either time.

All three judges scored the bout 119–108, meaning Alvarez won every round on every card. He lost one point for an illegal punch in the seventh round, which was uniformly scored 9–9.

Alvarez landed 47 percent of his 626 punches, including 53 percent of his power shots, while Hatton connected with just 25 percent of his 546 total blows.

== Aftermath ==
The fight averaged 1.4 million viewers on HBO.

== Undercard ==
Confirmed bouts:

=== Televised ===
- Super Welterweight Championship bout: (Mexico) Canelo Álvarez vs. (United Kingdom) Matthew Hatton
  - Alvarez defeats Hatton by unanimous decision.
- Super Featherweight bout: (Mexico) Daniel Ponce de Leon vs. (United States) Adrien Broner
  - Broner defeats de Leon by unanimous decision.

=== Untelevised ===
- Heavyweight bout: (United States) Seth Mitchell vs. (United States) Charles Davis
  - Mitchell defeats Davis by TKO at 1:02 of round 2.
- Super Middleweight bout: (United States) James Kirkland vs. (United States) Ahsandi Gibbs
  - Kirkland defeats Kliewer by KO at 0:34 of round 1.
- Super Middleweight bout: (United States) Daniel Jacobs vs. (United States) Robert Kliewer
  - Jacobs defeats Kliewer by TKO at 1:44 of round 1.
- Middleweight bout: (United States) Jason Montgomery vs. (United States) Cleven Ishe
  - Ishe defeats Montgomery by unanimous decision.
- Middleweight bout: (Venezuela) Alfonso Blanco vs. (Puerto Rico) Pablo Ruiz
  - Blanco defeats Ruiz by KO at 2:59 of round 1.

== Broadcasting ==
The bout aired on HBO's Boxing After Dark.

Country	Broadcaster
Mexico	Televisa
United Kingdom	Sky Sports
United States	HBO

Preceded by vs. Carlos Baldomir	Canelo Álvarez's bouts 5 March 2011	Succeeded by vs. Ryan Rhodes
Preceded by vs. Roberto Belge	Matthew Hatton's bouts 5 March 2011	Succeeded by vs. Kell Brook
