= Canelo Álvarez =

Mexican boxer (born 1990)

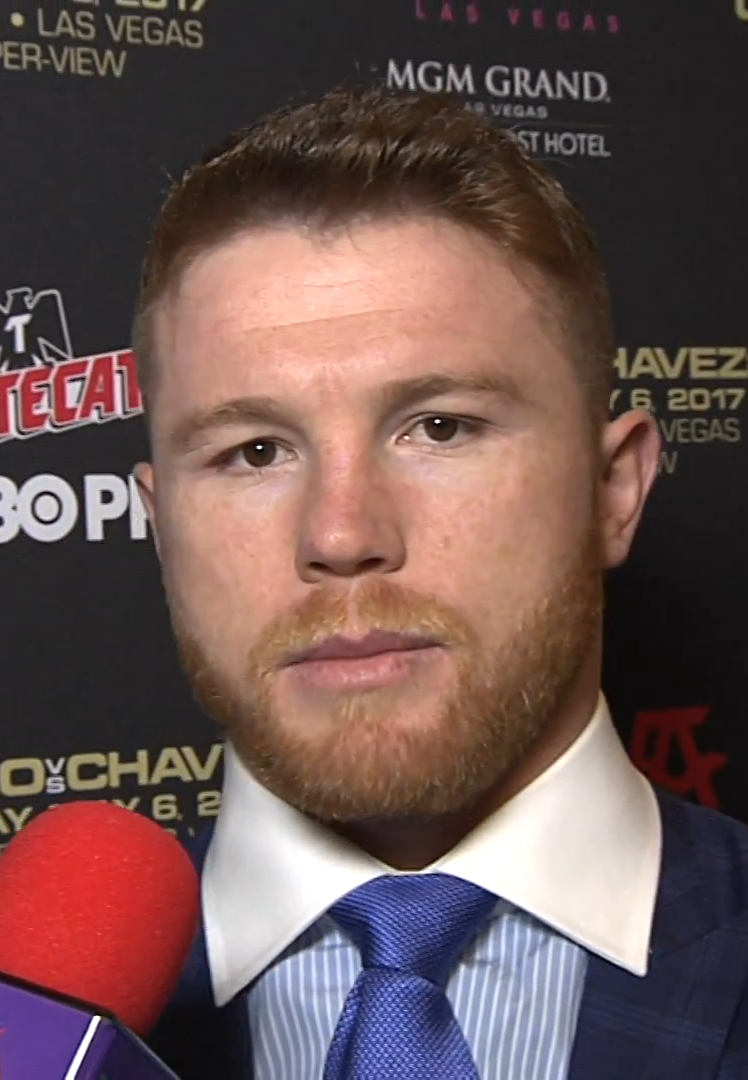
- Álvarez in 2017

Personal information
- Nickname: Canelo ("Cinnamon")
- Born: Santos Saúl Álvarez Barragán; 18 July 1990 (age 36) Guadalajara, Jalisco, Mexico
- Height: 5 ft 7 1/2 in (171 cm)
- Weight: Welterweight; Light middleweight; Middleweight; Super middleweight; Light heavyweight

Boxing career
- Reach: 70 1/2 in (179 cm)
- Stance: Orthodox

Boxing record
- Total fights: 69
- Wins: 64
- Win by KO: 39
- Losses: 3
- Draws: 2

Santos Saúl "Canelo" Álvarez Barragán (Latin American Spanish: [saˈul ˈalβaɾes]; born 18 July 1990) is a Mexican professional boxer. He has held multiple world championships in four weight classes, from light middleweight to light heavyweight, including unified titles in three of those weight classes. He has held the World Boxing Council (WBC) super middleweight title since October 2026. In 2021, Álvarez became the first boxer in history to become the undisputed (Note: Four-belt era: World Boxing Association (WBA) (Super version), World Boxing Council (WBC), International Boxing Federation (IBF), and World Boxing Organization (WBO) titles.) super middleweight champion, before becoming a two-time undisputed super middleweight champion in 2025. He also held the Ring magazine super middleweight title from 2020 to 2025.

Álvarez began his professional boxing career at age 15 and, by 20, became the youngest boxer to claim the World Boxing Council (WBC) light middleweight title in 2011. In 2013, he beat Austin Trout to win the World Boxing Association (WBA) (Unified version) and Ring titles. In the same year, he lost his WBC and Ring light middleweight titles to Floyd Mayweather Jr. in his first professional defeat. He defeated Miguel Cotto to win the WBC and Ring middleweight titles in 2016. That same year he returned to light middleweight to beat Liam Smith to win the World Boxing Organization (WBO) title. In 2017, he fought unified middleweight champion Gennady Golovkin to a split draw. Their rematch in 2018 saw Álvarez beat Golovkin to become the WBA (Super version), WBC, and Ring middleweight champion. The following year, he beat Rocky Fielding for the WBA super middleweight title (Regular version) and won the International Boxing Federation (IBF) middleweight title from Daniel Jacobs in 2019. Later that year, Álvarez made his light heavyweight debut, knocking out former unified champion Sergey Kovalev to claim the WBO title.

He went on to beat three unbeaten fighters (Callum Smith, Billy Joe Saunders, and Caleb Plant) to win all four titles at super middleweight, a feat he achieved inside 12 months. In May 2022, he returned to light heavyweight and challenged for the WBA (Super) light heavyweight title, but was defeated by Dmitry Bivol via unanimous decision. Known as an excellent counterpuncher, Álvarez is able to exploit openings in his opponents' guards while avoiding punches with head and body movement. He is also known as a formidable body puncher. The Ring ranked Álvarez as the world's best boxer, pound for pound, from 7 November 2019, to 7 May 2022.

One of boxing's biggest ever pay-per-view stars, he is consistently one of the highest-paid athletes in the world, making Forbes' list in 2019 (4th; $94 million), 2022 (8th; $90 million), and 2023 (5th; $110 million), and Sportico's list in 2021 (12th; $63 million), 2022 (5th; $89 million) and 2025 (2nd; $137 million). In April 2026, Sportico ranked him among the 50 highest-paid athletes of all time (estimated inflation-adjusted income $870 million).

== Early life ==
In an interview, Álvarez explained that he was born on the outskirts of Guadalajara, Jalisco, but his family is originally from Los Reyes, Michoacán. At the age of five, his family moved to their current home of Juanacatlán, Jalisco. Growing up on his family's farm, he learned horseback riding, which he continues today. Álvarez is the youngest of eight children, seven of them boys; all of his brothers also became professional boxers. Among his brothers are welterweight boxers Ramón Álvarez, Ricardo Álvarez and former WBA interim world champion, Rigoberto Álvarez.

Canelo in Spanish is the masculine word for cinnamon, which is a common nickname for people with red hair. In Mexico, it is common for people to associate red hair with the Irish soldiers who fought for Mexico in the Saint Patrick's Battalion during the Mexican–American War. Speaking about his ancestry, Álvarez once said, "There might have been an Irish grandfather somewhere back in my past." Canelo's neighbors nicknamed him "Jícama con Chile", which translates as jicama with chilli flakes — a popular snack in Mexico.

== Amateur career ==
Álvarez started boxing when he was around 13 years old, after watching his older brother Rigoberto debut as a professional boxer. In 2004, he won the silver medal at the Junior Mexican National Championships, held in Sinaloa. He became the 2005 Junior Mexican National Boxing Champion in Tuxtla Gutiérrez at the age of 15. His amateur record was 44–2 with 12 knockouts.

== Professional career ==
=== Early career ===
Álvarez turned professional at 15, shortly after his championship at the Junior Nationals, because his trainers at the time, father-and-son team Chepo and Eddy Reynoso, were unable to find suitable junior opponents for him. In his first 19 months as a professional, he knocked out eleven of his 13 documented opponents, all of whom were significantly older. The elder Reynoso stated in 2013 that Álvarez had fought ten more times in that span, winning all ten by knockout (KO), but that these fights (apparently in small venues in the Mexican state of Nayarit) were so poorly documented that it was not worth the trouble to seek to have the record corrected. Were this to be verified, his record would be 73–2–2 with 49 knockouts. His weight fluctuated in his first three years as a professional including two documented fights within the light welterweight limit of 140 lbs—one against Abraham Gonzalez in Álvarez's official debut and the other against Juan Hernandez in his sixth official bout—before he settled in the welterweight division at 147 lbs.

Álvarez's third official bout of his career was a win over future IBF lightweight champion Miguel Vázquez on 20 January 2006, in his home town of Guadalajara, Jalisco. On 28 June 2008, Álvarez defeated Vázquez again in a rematch. He also made world history on that fight card when he and all six of his brothers fought on the same night, with Canelo being the youngest. The only downside was that three of them failed to win their pro debuts. The other four more experienced brothers won. On 6 March 2010, he got a crushing third-round KO over Brian Camechis in Tuxtla Gutiérrez, Chiapas. Álvarez then defeated José Cotto on the undercard of Floyd Mayweather Jr. vs. Shane Mosley to retain his WBC-NABF welterweight title.

=== Light middleweight ===
His sixth-round technical knockout (TKO) win over Luciano Leonel Cuello for the WBC Silver light middleweight title was held at the Vicente Fernández Arena. During the post-fight interview, Mexican singer Vicente Fernández gave Álvarez a horse. He was also given a horse by the mayor of Tepic, where Álvarez sometimes trains.

He next faced the former WBC welterweight champion Carlos Baldomir at the Staples Center in Los Angeles, California, on the Shane Mosley vs. Sergio Mora undercard. Baldomir stated in a pre-fight interview that he wanted the winner of Mora vs. Mosley, as he said "after I knock out El Canelo." Baldomir weighed in at 69.6 kg (153.4 lb) for the bout, that was contracted for 68 kg (151 lb). In California, if a fighter is overweight he is penalized 20% of his purse and that percent is given to the other fighter. However, Álvarez declined to take the extra $12,000 from Baldomir. In the sixth round, Álvarez landed a crushing blow that knocked Baldomir out cold. With the victory, Álvarez became just the second boxer ever to stop Carlos Baldomir and the first boxer ever to knock him out. Álvarez then successfully defended his light middleweight title by unanimous decision against former world champion Lovemore N'dou in Veracruz. It was a competitive fight despite the wide margins on the official scorecards of 119–109, 120–108, and 120–108.

==== Álvarez vs. Hatton ====
Álvarez was in line as mandatory challenger for the winner of the vacant WBC light middleweight title bout between Manny Pacquiao and Antonio Margarito, however, Pacquiao who was the victor, wrote to the WBC stating he had no intention of defending the title and it was declared vacant. On 5 March 2011, Álvarez defeated European welterweight champion Matthew Hatton via unanimous decision, for the vacant WBC light middleweight belt. The bout was televised on HBO and took place at the Honda Center in Anaheim, California. Álvarez was docked a point in the seventh round, which was uniformly scored 9–9, for hitting after the break. All three ringside judges scored the bout 119–108 in favor of Álvarez, who landed 47% of his 626 punches, including 53% of his power shots. Hatton connected with just 25% of his 546 total blows in a fight that averaged 1.4 million viewers on HBO.

==== Álvarez vs. Rhodes ====
Álvarez successfully defended his newly awarded WBC title against #4 ranked Ring light middleweight and current European light middleweight champion Ryan Rhodes. Álvarez defeated Rhodes via TKO in the twelfth round on 18 June 2011, in Guadalajara, Jalisco. The fight averaged 1.6 million viewers on HBO.

==== Álvarez vs. Gómez ====
On 17 September 2011, Álvarez successfully defended that same WBC title against The Contender competitor Alfonso Gómez at the Staples Center in Los Angeles, winning via TKO in the sixth round. Gómez won a majority of the first five rounds after Álvarez knocked him down in the first round. Álvarez was looking for one shot and got it in the sixth round when he backed Gómez up with a right hand. He then followed up with a flurry to get the referee to jump in and stop the fight.

==== Álvarez vs. Cintrón ====
Álvarez defeated Kermit Cintrón via TKO in the fifth round. Álvarez spent the first three rounds feeling out his opponent Cintrón, a former welterweight champion, before punishing the Puerto Rican with body shots and straight right hands in the fourth round. He knocked Cintrón down once and had him in trouble at the end of the round, but Cintrón was saved by the bell. In the fifth round, Cintrón came out and caught Álvarez with some combinations, but Álvarez eventually overpowered him with several powerful straight right hands and the referee stepped in and stopped it. The fight averaged 1.5 million viewers on HBO: Boxing After Dark.

==== Álvarez vs. Mosley ====
Richard Schaefer announced that Álvarez's next bout would co-feature on the undercard of Miguel Cotto's clash with Floyd Mayweather Jr. at the MGM Grand Garden Arena. On 11 February 2012, Shane Mosley was announced as Álvarez's next opponent in May for his WBC light middleweight title. Álvarez defeated Mosley via unanimous decision after twelve rounds.

==== Álvarez vs. López ====
Álvarez was originally set to fight top ten Ring light middleweight and former welterweight champion Paul Williams on 15 September 2012. However, on 27 May 2012, a motorcycle accident in the U.S. state of Georgia paralyzed Williams from the waist down, ending his boxing career. Álvarez's possible opponents for his September bout were James Kirkland, Austin Trout, Delvin Rodriguez and most notably, Victor Ortiz.

Álvarez was scheduled to defend his title against former welterweight titlist Victor Ortiz in the main event of a Showtime pay-per-view (PPV) card dubbed 'Knockout Kings' at the MGM Grand Garden Arena. However, on 23 June, Ortiz was unable to defeat underdog Josesito López in what was supposed to be a "tune-up" fight at the Staples Center in Los Angeles, losing due to referee stoppage (broken jaw) and cancelling his bout with Álvarez as a result.

Due to this upset, López was instead penciled in to face Canelo at the MGM Grand on 15 September, for Álvarez's WBC light middleweight title. Álvarez won the fight via fifth-round TKO after dominating López from start to finish, staying undefeated and increasing his record of 41–0–1. The fight averaged 1.04 million on Showtime. Canelo earned $2 million for the fight and López a smaller amount of $212,500.

==== Álvarez vs. Trout ====
His next fight took place on 20 April 2013, at the Alamodome in San Antonio, Texas against Austin Trout. The fight was supposed to take place during Cinco de Mayo weekend as the co-main event to Floyd Mayweather Jr. vs. Robert Guerrero; however, due to a contract disagreement between Álvarez and Mayweather regarding their potential fight on 14 September 2013, Álvarez opted to headline his own card instead.

In front of 39,247 fans, Álvarez successfully defended his WBC light middleweight title and won both the WBA (Regular) and vacant Ring light middleweight titles. During the first few rounds, Trout seemed to have a good game plan. However, Álvarez's power took over after the third round, eventually scoring a knockdown in the seventh round to give Trout the first knockdown of his career. Álvarez set up the knockdown with a pawing left jab, followed by the straight right hand. The fight was closer than expected, but Álvarez still managed to dominate Trout throughout the fight with impressive head movement and shocking power. All three judges' scorecards were in favor of Álvarez with a fair margin 115–112 from Filipino judge Rey Danseco, 116–111 from Texas' judge Oren Shellenberger, and 118–109 from South African official Stanley Christodoulou. Although the last scorecard 118–109 created controversy, the majority of sport analysts had Álvarez winning by at least two points. CompuBox stats showed that Trout was the busier fighter, landing 154 of 769 punches thrown (20%) and Álvarez was the more accurate puncher, landing 124 of his 431 thrown (29%). Immediately after the bout, Trout stated that he hadn't underestimated Álvarez but that he trained to fight a completely different fighter.

==== Álvarez vs. Mayweather ====
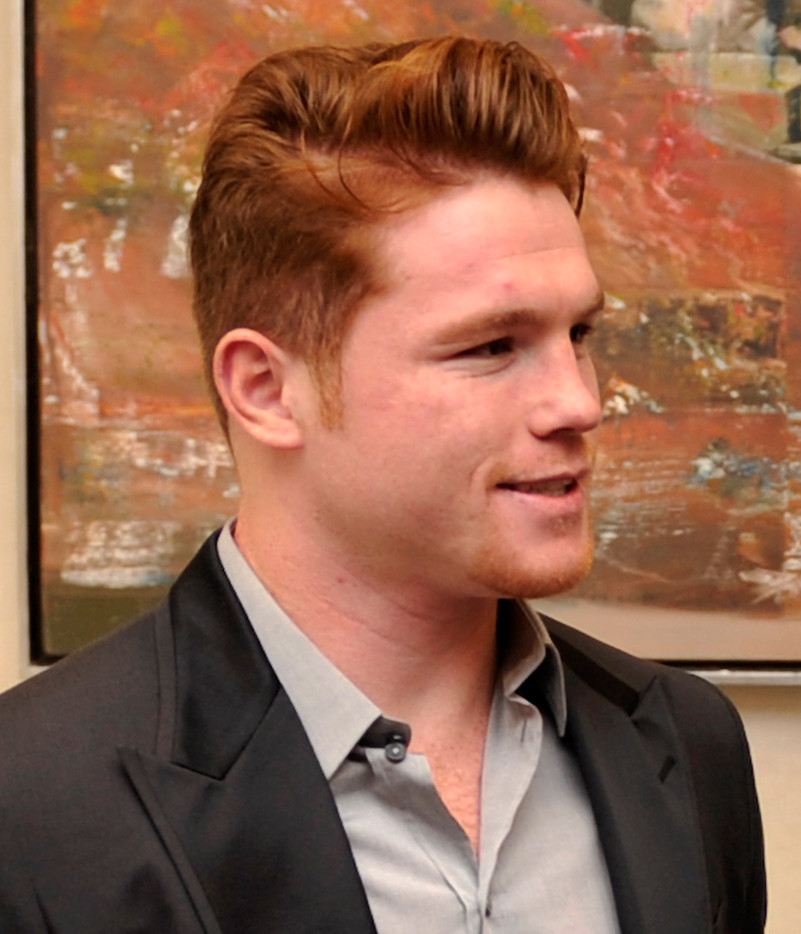
Álvarez at Los Pinos, 2013

Álvarez, Ring magazine's #1 ranked light middleweight and the unified WBA (Regular) and WBC champion, fought against Ring magazine's #1 pound-for-pound fighter, WBA (Super) light middleweight champion, WBC and Ring magazine welterweight champion, Floyd Mayweather Jr., on 14 September 2013. Mayweather held a world title at welterweight (67 kg (147 lb)), but he also still owned a light middleweight title (70 kg (154 lb)), which he won by outpointing Miguel Cotto in May 2012. He was moving back up in weight to face Álvarez with their belts on the line, although the fight was contested at a catchweight of 69 kg (152 lb). The titles disputed for the bout were Álvarez's WBC and Ring light middleweight titles and Mayweather's WBA (Super) light middleweight title. On fight night, Mayweather reportedly weighed 68 kg (150 lb) and Álvarez came in at 75 kg (165 lb).

In front of a sold-out crowd of 16,746 at the MGM Garden, Mayweather defeated Álvarez via majority decision. Judge C. J. Ross scored the fight 114–114, a draw. Judge Dave Moretti had it 116–112 and Craig Metcalfe scored it 117–111. Judge Ross retired after this fight. Speaking of the controversial scorecard, Mayweather said, "I can't control what the judges do." CompuBox stats showed Mayweather's dominance in the fight. He landed 232 of 505 punches (46%) while Álvarez connected on 117 of 526 thrown (22%). Mayweather earned a guaranteed $41.5 million to Álvarez's $5 million.

=== Catchweight ===
==== Álvarez vs. Angulo ====
On 9 January 2014, Golden Boy chief executive Richard Schaefer confirmed a deal had been made for a fight between Álvarez and 31 year old Mexican boxer Alfredo Angulo (22–3, 18 KOs) to take place on 8 March 2014, on Showtime PPV at the MGM Grand in Las Vegas. In March, ESPN reported the fight would take place at a catchweight of 70 kg (155 lb), due to Álvarez not being able to make the light middleweight limit of 154 lbs. For the PPV fight, Álvarez agreed to pay $100,000 of his minimum $1.25 million purse to Angulo, which would raise his purse $850,000. Also in the negotiations, Álvarez agreed to weigh no more than 76 kg (168 lb) on fight night. This was Álvarez's first of five fights which took place at the 70 kg (155 lb) catchweight. On fight night, Álvarez weighed 79 kg (174 lb) on Showtime's scale and Angulo weighed 77 kg (170 lb). In front of 14,610 at the MGM, Álvarez came out strong, throwing combinations. In a fairly lopsided beating, Álvarez scored a tenth-round stoppage over Angulo punctuated by a lead left uppercut. The end of the fight began in round six, when Angulo's left eye started swelling. When the referee waived the fight off, the crowd was displeased and booed. At the time of stoppage, two judges had it 89–82 and the third judge had it 88–83, all in favor of Álvarez.

Angulo stated post-fight how he was unhappy with the stoppage, "I told Tony he did the wrong job tonight. The referee tells us to take care of ourselves at all times. I can take care of myself. My plan was to work harder in the final four or three rounds. I had good preparation for this fight." His trainer Virgil Hunter was also unhappy with referee Tony Weeks, "I'm very upset. I told the referee and the doctor that if Canelo put two or three shots together that I would stop the fight. He landed one punch. Everyone knows Alfredo was coming on strong, everyone knows that."

==== Álvarez vs. Lara ====
Álvarez fought Erislandy Lara on 12 July 2014, at the MGM Grand in a non-title match. Lara's WBA light middleweight title was not on the line, as the fight took place at a 70 kg (155 lb) catchweight and both fighters weighed in at precisely 70 kg (155 lb). Álvarez rehydrated to 78 kg (171 lb) while Lara came into the ring at 75 kg (166 lb). In a very close and competitive fight that went to a split decision, Álvarez came out on top with two judges scoring 115–113 in favor of each fighter and the final judge scoring 117–111 in favor of Álvarez. The final scorecard was controversial as many observers considered it far too wide. According to CompuBox, Lara landed 55 jabs to nine from Álvarez, who landed the jab at a five percent connect rate. Álvarez managed to land 88 power punches while Lara landed 53 power punches. Lara's clean punching, defense and movement were weighed against Álvarez's effective aggressiveness and power punching. Lara came out in dominant fashion, utilizing a stick-and-move style and capturing the early rounds. Although Álvarez struggled with Lara's one-two combinations, Lara's punches weren't thrown with sufficient power or frequency to dissuade him from consistently pressing the fight against a retreating Lara, and he was able to hammer away to Lara's body when he had him on the ropes. Lara's lead hand played a huge role in his one-two combination's effectiveness, but his output dropped as the fight progressed and he became increasingly tentative. Álvarez was able to cut Lara with a lead left uppercut in the seventh round. Although the decision remains controversial, any talk of a rematch in the future was dismissed by Oscar De La Hoya who went on to say, "No one wants a rematch."

==== Álvarez vs. Kirkland ====
In January 2015, Oscar De La Hoya announced that Álvarez and James Kirkland (32–1, 28 KOs) had agreed to fight each other although no date or venue was set, in a non-title light middleweight bout. The reason why the date was not set was due to the upcoming Floyd Mayweather Jr. vs. Manny Pacquiao fight not having an official date. In March, at the official press conference, the fight was announced to take place at the Minute Maid Park in Houston, Texas on 9 May 2015, live on HBO, a week after the 2 May fight between Mayweather and Pacquiao. It marked the first fight of Álvarez's lucrative HBO contract. In front of 31,588, Álvarez defeated Kirkland via third-round KO. Kirkland came out aggressively, but Álvarez wobbled him and scored a knockdown via straight right hand in round one. In the third round, a counter right uppercut sent Kirkland to the canvas. Álvarez ended the fight with a jab to the body quickly followed by the right hand, creating the KO. Álvarez landed 87 of 150 punches thrown (58%) and Kirkland landed 42 of 197 (21%). After the bout, Kirkland said, "I did not know I was knocked out." He was then taken to hospital to undergo a CT scan. The win for Álvarez set up a mega PPV fight between himself and WBC middleweight champion Miguel Cotto. The fight drew an average of 2.146 million viewers on HBO and peaked at 2.296 million, the highest viewership for HBO in 2015.

==== Álvarez vs. Cotto ====
On 21 November 2015, Álvarez won the WBC, and Ring middleweight titles with a unanimous decision victory over Miguel Cotto in front of a sold-out crowd of 11,274 at the Mandalay Bay Events Center in Las Vegas. The fight took place at a catchweight of 70 kg (155 lb) at Cotto's request. Although Cotto gave a tremendous effort, moving nicely throughout the fight, the judges clearly went for Álvarez's superior power and accuracy, with surprisingly wide scores of 117–111, 119–109, and 118–110. ESPN.com had the fight much closer, but still scored it in favour of Álvarez, 115–113. According to CompuBox, Álvarez landed 155 of 484 punches (32%) and Cotto landed 129 of 629 (21%), with Álvarez landing the heavier blows and inflicting more damage. Two months after the fight, the WBC awarded Álvarez the WBC Diamond middleweight title at their headquarters in Mexico.

According to HBO, the fight generated 900,000 buys on PPV, which equated to around $58 million in domestic revenue. This was the first time since 2002, that a PPV generated 900,000 which didn't include Mayweather, Pacquiao or De La Hoya. That bout was a heavyweight title fight between Lennox Lewis and Mike Tyson.

==== Álvarez vs. Khan ====
In early 2016, it was announced that British boxer Amir Khan was moving up two weight divisions to fight Álvarez at middleweight for his WBC and Ring middleweight titles. The fight took place on 7 May 2016, at the new T-Mobile Arena in Las Vegas. The bout was on HBO PPV. Khan kept his distance in the first five rounds, using his speed to come in and step out which initially caused trouble for Álvarez. In round six, Álvarez landed a devastating right hand that knocked out Khan. The fight generated a live gate of $7,417,350, according to figures released by the Nevada State Athletic Commission (NSAC). That total came from 13,072 tickets sold, far short of a sell out. The Álvarez–Khan gross placed it 34th-best in Nevada history at the time. The fight drew close to 600,000 PPV buys.

After the fight, Álvarez and his team invited middleweight champion Gennady "GGG" Golovkin into the ring to promote a future fight between them. During the post-fight interview with HBO's Max Kellerman, Álvarez stated, "Let's fight now." On 18 May 2016, Álvarez vacated the WBC title he defended in fighting Khan. The WBC immediately awarded the title to Gennady Golovkin.

=== Return to light middleweight ===
==== Álvarez vs. Liam Smith ====
On 24 June, it was announced that Álvarez was to drop the extra pound to 154 and challenge 27 year old WBO champion Liam Smith (23–0–1, 13 KOs) from England on 17 September 2016, in the main event of a card on HBO PPV. On 18 July, Golden Boy Promotions announced the bout would take place at AT&T Stadium in Arlington, Texas, after the MGM Grand in Las Vegas was the other venue looking to host the fight. Having fought his last five fights at his preferred 155-pound catchweight, Canelo said, "I am very pleased to announce my next fight against Liam Smith, a tremendous fighter with real knockout power, and the WBO light middleweight world title owner, I have no doubt that this fight will be give and take, which will fill the expectations of the fans, and I will work with all the enthusiasm as I always do to get the upper hand on Sept. 17."

In front of a record breaking crowd of 51,240, Álvarez regained a world title at light middleweight following a devastating left hook to the body in round nine. Smith was also knocked down once in round seven and once in round eight, in a fight where Álvarez was in control from the opening bell. Álvarez landed 157 punches from 422 thrown with a connect rate of 37%, compared to Smith landing 115 from 403 thrown, a connect rate of 29%. The fight drew an estimate of 300,000 PPV buys.

Golden Boy president Eric Gomez spoke to Ring magazine in December, stating that Álvarez had no immediate plans to vacate the WBO title and may fight in the first quarter of 2017 at 154, defending his world title. He also stated that there were still plans for Álvarez to fight Golovkin later in the year.

=== Return to catchweight ===
==== Álvarez vs. Chávez Jr. ====
Following Julio César Chávez Jr.'s comeback win against Dominik Britsch in December 2016, he claimed he was back and ready to fight Golovkin at 168 lbs and Álvarez at a 164-pound catchweight. Negotiations began soon after for a potential HBO PPV fight to take place in 2017 on Cinco de Mayo weekend, as there was interest from both sides that a fight take place. De La Hoya said a fight with Golovkin would still be likely for September 2017. Golden Boy president Eric Gomez confirmed a catchweight of 165 lbs was agreed between both sides. WBC president Mauricio Sulaiman was on board, saying he would likely get his organisation involved in the bout and that it was a "very attractive fight." On 18 December, Julio César Chávez Sr. spoke about the ongoing negotiations, saying Golden Boy were offering his son a small amount for the potential big PPV fight. He went on to claim his son was offered a $5 million purse with no mention he would get a cut of the PPV revenue, a counter offer was submitted. A rematch clause was also discussed, which Chávez Jr. and his team had no problem with. Chávez Sr. went on to admit that he was fully aware Álvarez is the A-side in the fight and would settle for no less than 30–35% of the full revenue.

On 22 December, the WBO made Álvarez the mandatory challenger to the middleweight title, skipping the previous number one Avtandil Khurtsidze, which was considered controversial due to Álvarez currently not fighting at middleweight. Khurtsidze, who had ten days to appeal decision, decided not to. On 24 December, Álvarez and his team gave Chávez Jr. a week to accept the terms, which included a purse of $7 million, or he would consider other options. On 12 January 2017, De La Hoya and Álvarez called for the contract to be signed, which was supposedly sent to Al Haymon, who advises Chávez Jr. and urged him to sign it. A day later, Chávez Jr. claimed he had agreed to all the demands set by Álvarez and said that he would sign the contract. According to Chávez Jr., the new demands included a weight limit set at 164.5 lbs and a $6 million base purse, plus PPV revenue percentages.

On 13 January, Álvarez officially confirmed the fight to take place on 6 May 2017. A rematch clause was also put in place if Chávez Jr. wins the fight and another clause for every pound Chávez Jr. weighs over the limit, he would be fined $1 million. On 4 February, Golden Boy Promotions announced that the fight would take place at the T-Mobile Arena in Paradise, Nevada. On 22 February, Álvarez announced that he planned on vacating his WBO light middleweight title following the Chávez Jr. fight and fighting at middleweight. On 3 March, The fight was announced a sell out on with 20,000 tickets being sold after they initially went on sale to the public on 20 February. On 11 April, Álvarez spoke to boxing reporters in a teleconference and said that he would fight as a 160-pound middleweight after the Chávez Jr. fight.

According to the NSAC, it was reported that Álvarez would earn $5 million and Chávez Jr. would earn $3 million before any shares of PPV. The figures would increase based on PPV sales.

In front of a sold-out crowd of 20,510, Álvarez won the fight in dominant fashion via a shutout unanimous decision. All three judges scored it 120–108 for Álvarez. Chávez Jr. was very cautious throughout the fight. At times, he came forward and also had Álvarez against the ropes, but failed to throw any punches. This led to jeers from the crowd in the later rounds due to a lack of action. Álvarez spoke to HBO's Max Kellerman in the post-fight interview, talking about his fighting style, "Tonight, I showed I could move, I could box, I showed as a fighter I can do all things. I thought I was going to showcase myself as a fighter that could throw punches, but he just wouldn't do it. I've shown I can do lots of things in the ring, anything a fighter brings, I've shown I can showcase myself." CompuBox stats showed that Álvarez landed 228 of 604 his punches thrown (38%) and Chávez Jr. landed 71 of 302 (24%). By the end of round five, Álvarez landed 102 punches compared to Chávez Jr.'s 25 landed. Early figures revealed that the fight generated at least one million buys. A replay was shown on regular HBO a week later and drew an average of 769,000 viewers. This was the first boxing match to generate over a million PPV buys that didn't include Mayweather, Pacquiao or De La Hoya since 2002, which saw Lennox Lewis retain his heavyweight world titles against Mike Tyson. Later sources confirmed the fight did close to 1.2 million buys, which means it would have generated around $80 million.

=== Middleweight ===
==== Álvarez vs. Golovkin ====
Immediately after the Chávez Jr. fight, Álvarez announced that he would next fight Gennady Golovkin on 16 September 2017, at a location to be determined. Golovkin, who stated he would not attend the fight, was joined by his trainer Abel Sanchez and promoter Tom Loeffler. Golovkin joined him in the ring during the announcement to help promote their upcoming bout. Speaking through a translator, Álvarez said, "Golovkin, you are next, my friend. The fight is done. I've never feared anyone, since I was 15 fighting as a professional. When I was born, fear was gone." When Golovkin arrived in the ring, he said, "I feel very excited. Right now is a different story. In September, it will be a different style – a big drama show. I'm ready. Tonight, first congrats to Canelo and his team. Right now, I think everyone is excited for September. Canelo looked very good tonight, and 100 percent he is the biggest challenge of my career. Good luck to Canelo in September."

On 9 May, Eric Gomez, president of Golden Boy Promotions told the LA Times that Álvarez had an immediate rematch clause in place on his contract, whereas Golovkin, if he loses, won't be guaranteed a rematch. De La Hoya later revealed in an interview with ESPN that the fight would also take place at the full middleweight limit of 73 kg (160 lb) with no rehydration clauses, meaning Golovkin and Álvarez would be able to gain an unlimited amount of weight following the weigh in. On 5 June, the T-Mobile Arena in Las Vegas was announced as the venue of the fight and would mark the first time Golovkin would fight in the state of Nevada. The AT&T Stadium, Madison Square Garden and Dodgers Stadium missed out on hosting the fight. Eric Gomez of Golden Boy Promotions said in a statement that Álvarez would fight for the IBF title, meaning he would participate in the second day weigh in where the IBF requires that each boxer weighs no more than ten lbs over the 160-pound limit. Although he said there was no word on whether Álvarez would fight for the WBC title, Álvarez claimed that he would not be. On 7 July 2017, Golden Boy and K2 Promotions individually announced the tickets had sold out.

On 15 August, Golden Boy matchmaker Robert Diaz revealed that Álvarez would indeed attend the IBF mandatory second day weigh in and fully intended to fight for both the IBF title and the WBA title. He also made it clear that whilst Golovkin would still defend the WBC and IBO title, Álvarez would not pay their sanctioning fees. On 22 August, IBF president Daryl Peoples announced that they would be dropping the mandatory second day weigh in for unification fights, meaning neither fighter is required to participate, however they would still encourage them to do so. It was reported that Álvarez would earn a base minimum $5 million and Golovkin would earn $3 million, before any shares of the revenue are added to their purses.

On fight night, in front of a sold-out crowd of 22,358, Golovkin and Álvarez fought to a split draw (118–110 Álvarez, 115–113 Golovkin, and 114–114). ESPN's Dan Rafael and HBO's Harold Lederman scored the fight 116–112 in favor of Golovkin. Judge Adalaide Byrd's scorecard of 118–110 in favor of Álvarez was widely ridiculed. Many observers felt that Golovkin had won a narrow, closely contested fight and while a draw was justifiable, a card that wide in favor of Álvarez was inexcusable. Nevertheless, Bob Bennett, director of the Nevada Athletic Commission, said that he had full confidence in Byrd going forward. Despite the controversy, several mainstream media outlets referred to the bout as a "classic". The fight started with both boxers finding their rhythm, Álvarez using his footwork and Golovkin establishing his jab. During the middle rounds, particularly between four and eight, Álvarez started each round quickly, but seemed to tire out after a minute, with Golovkin taking over and doing enough to win the rounds. The championship rounds were arguably the best rounds and Álvarez started to counter more and both fighters stood toe-to-toe exchanging swings, the majority of which missed. The draw saw Golovkin make his 19th consecutive defense, just one behind middleweight great Bernard Hopkins. CompuBox stats showed that Golovkin was the busier of the two, landing 218 of 703 thrown (31%), while Álvarez was more accurate, landing 169 of his 505 thrown (34%). Golovkin out landed Álvarez in ten of the twelve rounds. The replay, which took place a week later on HBO averaged 726,000, peaking at 840,000 viewers.

Speaking to Max Kellerman after the fight, Golovkin said, "It was a big drama show. [The scoring] is not my fault. I put pressure on him every round. Look, I still have all the belts. I am still the champion." Álvarez felt as though he won the fight, "In the first rounds, I came out to see what he had. Then I was building from there. I think I won eight rounds. I felt that I won the fight. I think I was superior in the ring. I won at least seven or eight rounds. I was able to counterpunch and made Gennady wobble at least three times. If we fight again, it's up to the people. I feel frustrated over my draw." Golovkin's trainer Abel Sanchez believed judge Byrd had her scorecard filled out before the first bell rang. Álvarez ruled out another fight in 2017, claiming he would return on Cinco de Mayo weekend in May 2018. At the post-fight press conference, Álvarez said through a translator, "Look, right now I wanna rest. Whatever the fans want, whatever the people want and ask for, we'll do. You know that's my style. But right now, who knows if it's in May or September? But one thing's for sure – this is my era, the era of Canelo". Golovkin's promoter Tom Loeffler stated that they would like an immediate rematch, but Golovkin, who prefers fighting at least three times in a calendar year, reiterated his desire to also fight in December.

The fight surpassed Mayweather–Álvarez to achieve the third highest gate in boxing history. ESPN reported the fight generated $27,059,850 from 17,318 tickets sold. 934 complimentary tickets were given out, according to the NSAC. Mayweather vs. Álvarez sold 16,146 tickets to produce a live gate of $20,003,150.

The replay, which took place a week later on HBO averaged 726,000, peaking at 840,000 viewers. The Los Angeles Times reported the fight generated 1.3 million domestic PPV buys. Although HBO didn't make an official announcement, it is believed that the revenue would exceed $100 million.

==== Álvarez vs. Golovkin II ====
Immediately after the controversial ending, talks began for a rematch between Álvarez and Golovkin. Álvarez stated he would next fight in May 2018, whereas Golovkin was open to fighting in December 2017. ESPN reported that Álvarez, who only had the rematch clause in his contract, must activate it within three weeks of their fight. On 19 September, Golden Boy Promotions president Eric Gomez told ESPN that everyone on their side was interested in the rematch and they would hold discussions with Tom Loeffler in the coming days. Ringtv reported that the negotiations would begin on 22 September. On 24 September, Gomez said the rematch would likely take place in the first week of May 2018 or as early as March if a deal could be worked. Despite ongoing negotiations for the rematch, at the 55th annual convention in Baku, Azerbaijan on 2 October, the WBC officially ordered a rematch. Gomez reacted by telling ESPN, "Regardless of if they did or didn't order the rematch, we are going to try to make it happen. We'll do whatever it takes to make it happen." On 7 November, Gomez indicated the negotiations were going well and Álvarez would make a decision in regards to the rematch in the following weeks. It was believed that Golden Boy would wait until after David Lemieux and Billy Joe Saunders fought for the latter's WBO title on 16 December 2017, before making a decision. On 15 November, Matchroom's Eddie Hearn, promoter of Daniel Jacobs, stated that he approached Tom Loeffler regarding a possible rematch between Golovkin and Jacobs if the Álvarez–Golovkin rematch failed to take place. On 20 December, Gomez announced that the negotiations were close to being finalized after Álvarez gave Golden Boy the go-ahead to write up the contracts. On 29 January 2018, HBO finally announced the rematch would take place in May on Cinco de Mayo weekend. On 22 February, the T-Mobile Arena was again selected as the fight's venue. According to WBC president Mauricio Sulaiman, Álvarez would fight Golovkin for their title this time around.

In March 2018, Álvarez tested positive for the banned substance clenbuterol ahead of the fight. Adding to the controversy, Golovkin's trainer Abel Sanchez claimed that Álvarez had his hands wrapped in an illegal manner for the first fight. On 23 March, the NSAC temporarily suspended Álvarez due to his two positive tests for the banned substance clenbuterol. Álvarez was required to appear at a commission hearing, either in person or via telephone, on the issue on 10 April. The commission would decide at the hearing whether the fight would be permitted to go ahead as scheduled. On 28 March, MGM Resorts International, who own the T-Mobile Arena, started to offer full refunds to anyone who had already purchased tickets for the bout. They wrote, "In the event a fan requested a refund, they could get one at the original point of sale and in full." The Las Vegas Review-Journal reported the news. The hearing was rescheduled for 18 April, as Bob Bennett filed a complaint against Álvarez. On 3 April, Álvarez officially withdrew from the rematch. Golden Boy mentioned during a press conference it was hinted that Álvarez would likely not be cleared at the hearing and they would not have enough time to promote the fight.

On 13 April, an unofficial source stated that Álvarez had checked into a private hospital in Guadalajara for an arthroscopy knee surgery. A spokesperson for Golden Boy later said it was a cosmetic surgery. After surgery, Álvarez posted a picture on social media with a caption reading, "I share that today I had to undergo an arthroscopic surgery to repair the internal femoral cartilage and eliminate a pathological fold of my right knee." Eric Gomez of Golden Boy later confirmed that Álvarez had "a cyst taken out of his knee" and there were no serious issues with his knee.

At the hearing, Álvarez was given a six-month suspension, backdated to his first drug test fail on 17 February, meaning the ban would end on 17 August 2018. The Voluntary Anti-Doping Association (VADA) stated that Álvarez was not enrolled in their testing program. His promoter De La Hoya then announced that Álvarez would return to the ring on Mexican Independence Day weekend.

According to Golovkin on 27 April, before he defeated Vanes Martirosyan, a fight with Álvarez in the fall was still a priority. During a conference call, he stated it was the "biggest fight in the world" and beneficial for all parties involved. Although Golovkin stated the rematch had a ten percent chance of happening, Eric Gomez and Tom Loeffler agreed to meet and start negotiating after 5 May. One of the main issues preventing the rematch to take place was the purse split. Álvarez wanted 65–35 in his favor, the same terms Golovkin agreed to initially, however Golovkin wanted a straight 50–50 split.

On 6 June, Golovkin was stripped of his IBF title due to not adhering to the IBF's rules. The IBF granted Golovkin an exception to fight Martirosyan, although they would not sanction the fight and told Golovkin's team to start negotiating and fight mandatory challenger Sergiy Derevyanchenko by 3 August 2018. The IBF released a statement in detail explaining its decision to strip Golovkin of the belt. On 7 June, Golovkin's team stated they would accept a 55–45 split in favor of Álvarez. Five days later on 12 June, Golden Boy gave Golovkin a 24-hour deadline to accept a 57½–42½ split in Álvarez's favor or they would explore other fights. At this time, Golden Boy were already in light negotiations with Eddie Hearn for a fight against Daniel Jacobs instead. At the same time, Loeffler was working closely with Frank Warren to match Saunders with Golovkin at the end of August. Golovkin declined the offer and De La Hoya stated there would be no rematch. Despite this, some sources indicated both sides were still negotiating after a "Hail Mary" idea came to light. Hours later, De La Hoya confirmed via his Twitter account that terms had been agreed and the fight would indeed take place on 15 September at the T-Mobile Arena in Las Vegas, Nevada. Golovkin revealed to ESPN he agreed to 45%. Álvarez started training for the bout on 14 June and stated his intention to apply for his boxing license on 18 August. It was confirmed that both boxers would not physically come face to face with each other until the fight week. A split-screen press conference took place on 3 July. On 3 September, due to a majority vote of the panel, it was announced that the vacant Ring middleweight title would be contested for the bout. Doug Fischer wrote, "We posed the question to the ratings panel, which, in a landslide, voted in favor the magazine's 160-pound championship being up for grabs when the two stars clash at T-Mobile Arena in Las Vegas." The IBO's middleweight title was only at stake for Golovkin as Canelo refused to pay the sanctioning fee.

In front of a sell out crowd of 21,965, the fight was again not without controversy as Álvarez defeated Golovkin via majority decision after twelve rounds. Álvarez was favored by judges Dave Moretti and Steve Weisfeld, both scoring the bout 115–113, the third judge Glenn Feldman scored it 114–114. The result was disputed by fans, pundits and media. Of the 18 media outlets scoring the bout, ten ruled in favor of Golovkin, seven scored a draw while one scored the bout for Álvarez. The scorecards showed how close the bout was, with the judges splitting eight rounds. After nine rounds, all three judges had their scorecards reading 87–84 for Álvarez.

The fight was much different from the first bout in terms of action. Álvarez who was described by Golovkin's team as a "runner", altered his style and became more aggressive. Both boxers found use of their respective jabs from the opening round with Golovkin using his jab more as the fight went on. Big punches were landed by both fighters during the bout, with both Álvarez and Golovkin showing excellent chins. Despite the tense build up, both boxers showed each other respect after the fight. Álvarez made good use of his body attack, landing 46 compared to Golovkin's six landed. CompuBox stats showed that Golovkin landed 234 of 879 punches thrown (27%) and Álvarez landed 202 of his 622 punches (33%). Golovkin had the edge in jabs, landing 118 out of 547 (21.6%) compared to 59 out of 256 (23%) for Álvarez. However, Álvarez had the edge in power punches, landing 143 out of 366 (39.1%) compared to 116 out of 332 (34.9%) for Golovkin. In eight of the rounds Golovkin outlanded Álvarez in total punches whereas Álvarez outlanded him in power punches in 9 of the rounds.

Álvarez stated that the fight was a "clear victory" and that "in the end, it was a victory for Mexico. And again, it was an opportunity. And I want to shout out to my opponent, the best in the sport of boxing. I am a great fighter, and I showed it tonight. If the people want another round, I'll do it again. But for right now, I will enjoy time with my family." Golovkin did not take part in the post-fight and made his way backstage where he received stitches for a cut over his right eye. He later responded to the defeat, explaining that "I'm not going to say who won tonight, because the victory belongs to Canelo, according to the judges. I thought it was a very good fight for the fans and very exciting. I thought I fought better than he did." Both fighters were open to a trilogy.

The fight generated a live gate of $23,473,500 from 16,732 tickets sold. This was lower than the first bout, but still the fourth largest-grossing gates in Nevada boxing history. The fight sold 1.1 million PPV buys, lower than the first bout; however, due to being priced at $84.95, it generated more revenue at around $94 million.

=== Super middleweight ===
==== Álvarez vs. Fielding ====
In October 2018, Álvarez announced that he would move up to the super middleweight division for the first time in his career to fight 31-year-old British boxer Rocky Fielding (27–1, 15 KOs) at Madison Square Garden in New York City, New York on 15 December 2018, for the WBA (Regular) super middleweight title. On 17 October 2018, DAZN announced that it had signed a five-year, $365 million deal with Álvarez, under which his next eleven fights would be broadcast in the U.S. by the subscription sports streaming service. The deal would begin with Álvarez vs. Fielding and replace his expired contract with HBO (which had also announced its discontinuation of boxing telecasts).

Álvarez would dominate the bout, with the taller Fielding not attempting to establish the range but instead he was dropped in each of the first two rounds with left hands to the body. Fielding was able to land some combinations of his own but they lacked the power required to trouble Canelo. A right to the jaw again dropped Fielding in round three, prompting the referee to warn the brit that "one more" would end the bout. Later in the round another left to the body dropped Fielding for the fourth time at which point referee Ricky Gonzalez stopped the bout. According to CompuBox, Álvarez would land 73 of 141 (52%) of his punches against just 37 of 183 (20%) of Fielding's Speaking after the bout said Alvarez "Fortunately for me he came to attack, that was the error he made and I did my thing in there." Fielding would admit he made a tactical error in trading with Canelo saying that "I stood there too long, thought I could mix it with him and shouldn't have, with my height, I should have kept the fight long, at distance. The better man won."

=== Return to middleweight ===
==== Álvarez vs. Jacobs ====
In January 2019, Álvarez announced he would return to the middleweight division to face Daniel Jacobs in an attempt to unify his WBA, WBC and The Ring belts with Jacobs' IBF title on 4 May 2019 at the T-Mobile Arena in Las Vegas.

The bout included a rehydration clause of 10 pounds, but Jacobs came in 1.7 kg (3.7 lb) over a contracted rehydration limit of 77 kg (170 lb) the morning of the bout (a stipulation demanded by Álvarez's team), costing him nearly $1,000,000 of his $10,000,000 guaranteed purse.

Álvarez defeated Jacobs via unanimous decision, 115–113, 115–113, 116–112, to unify his WBA (Super), WBC, and Ring middleweight titles with Jacobs' IBF middleweight title.

=== Light heavyweight ===
==== Álvarez vs. Kovalev ====
On 25 July 2019, it became known that Sergey Kovalev (34–3–1, 29 KOs) was again negotiating a deal to fight Álvarez for October 2019, in a fight that would see Álvarez make his light heavyweight debut. There was reports implying the fight with Anthony Yarde, who the WBO ordered Kovalev to fight, would be scrapped if Golden Boy Promotions and Main Events successfully negotiated a deal. Álvarez was ordered by the IBF to defend the title against Sergiy Derevyanchenko. John Skipper, who was DAZN's executive chairman, where Álvarez was tied into a contract, stated the steaming service would only approve Kovalev or a trilogy fight with Gennady Golovkin as Álvarez's next fight. According to Egis Klimas, an agreement was in place for Kovalev to fight Álvarez, if he was to defeat Yarde. On 8 August, Álvarez decided to wait until after Kovalev's fight with Yarde to decide his next opponent. Yarde revealed he was approached multiple times for step aside offers. He was first offered less than his purse for the Kovalev fight, then offered the same amount. Yarde joked that these offers needed to be more than double his purse for him to consider stepping aside. During fight week, Kovalev spoke to reporters to explain the reason why he turned down a last minute eight-figure offer from Álvarez was due to the Yarde fight only being three weeks away. Tickets were already on sale and being sold. Also the matter that Kovalev was defending his world title in front his own fans in his hometown, having fought the majority of his career in the United States. Speaking to Steve Bunce, Kovalev said he wanted five more fights and a chance to become undisputed champion.

A few weeks after Kovalev defeated Yarde, the fight between Kovalev and Álvarez was formally announced to take place on 2 November 2019 at the MGM Grand in Las Vegas, exclusively on DAZN. The fight would see Álvarez move up in weigh again in attempt to become a four-division world champion and only the second Mexican to win a world title at light heavyweight. Álvarez was looking to make history. He said, "The second phase of my career is continuing just as we had planned, and that's why we are continuing to make great fights to enter into the history books of boxing. That's also why I've decided to jump two weight classes against one of the most feared champions of recent years. Kovalev is a dangerous puncher, and he's naturally the bigger man, but that's the kind of challenges and risks that I like to face." Kovalev said of the fight, "In order to be the best you have to beat the best. I have always tried to fight the toughest opponents in my division, but many have ducked me throughout my career. Canelo wanted to fight me; to step up to higher weight and challenge for my belt." The ideal location for the fight was the T-Mobile Arena, but was not available due to Vegas Golden Knights having an NHL game on 2 November.

According to Eric Gomez of Golden Boy Promotions, completing the deal with Main Events was easy. The hurdles came before that where different parties tried to jeopardise the fight. Kovalev's former trainer John David Jackson stated the only reason Team Canelo picked Kovalev was due to him being the weakest of the champion in the division. At the time, the other champions were Beterbiev, Bivol, and Gvozdyk. He said, "I’m not saying Kovalev can’t beat them because he can punch. At this stage of his career he’s on the decline compared to them." Álvarez said he picked Kovalev because 'he's the best in his division, he's one of the best [in the sport]'. The event was criticised by UFC boss Dana White for going head-to-head with UFC 244, which was being aired on ESPN+, a rival network.

There was talk amongst the boxing media whether Álvarez would utilise the full 79 kg (175 lb) weight limit or whether he would weigh lighter. During a media call, Álvarez said he planned on weighing at the limit. This was Kovalev's 17th consecutive title fight. Kovalev towered over Álvarez being 10 cm (4 in) taller. At the weigh-in, Álvarez weighed 79.2 kg (174.5 lb)s. At first, Kovalev stepped on the scales at 80 kg (176 lb), which was above the limit. He then expected to make the required weight by removing his necklace, only to weigh 79.6 kg (175.5 lb). He removed his clothes to step on the scales a third time, but was still over, this time at 79.49 kg (175.25 lb). He was given an hour by the NSAC to lose the extra weight. Kovalev returned a few minutes and weighing in at the 79 kg (175 lb) limit. Both boxers had to adhere to the rehydration clause where neither could weigh above 84 kg (185 lb) on the morning of the fight.

There was a crowd of 14,490 in attendance, mostly pro-Álvarez. There was over an hour delay before the main event started. DAZN wanted to wait for the UFC 244 main event to finish, to maximise the amount of subscribers to tune into the boxing. MGM Grand were granted permission from ESPN+, the UFC broadcaster, to allow them to show the UFC main event in the arena, whilst the crowd waited. The boxing began at 1:18 a.m. ET.

The fight was competitive throughout up until round 11 were Álvarez knocked out Kovalev to claim his WBO light heavyweight title. Kovalev worked off his jab from the opening round, finding success and winning rounds. Álvarez starting landing more power shots in the second half of the fight, but at the same time, Kovalev's jab was still connecting, frustrating Álvarez. Kovalev had his best round in the eighth pushing Álvarez on the backfoot. In the ninth and tenth rounds, Kovalev had further success out-landing Álvarez 34–22 in punches landed. Everything changed in the eleventh. Álvarez caught Kovalev with a left hook to the head which badly staggered him. He then followed with an accurately placed right hand to the chin, which had Kovalev knocked out against the second rope. Referee Russell Mora didn't start a count and immediately stopped the fight with the official time of the stoppage being 2:15 of round 11. Kovalev was stopped for just the third time in his career. At the time of the stoppage, Álvarez led 96–94 on two of the judges' scorecards, with the other scorecard even at 95–95. Some within the media had Kovalev was ahead, including ESPN's Dan Rafael, who had it 97–93. Álvarez joined Thomas Hearns, Sugar Ray Leonard, and Mike McCallum as the only former light middleweight champions in history to win a title at light heavyweight. According to CompuBox, Álvarez landed 133 of 345 punches thrown (39%) while Kovalev landed 115 of 745 thrown (15%). Kovalev threw a career-high 577 jabs, landing only 63 of them.

Speaking after the fight, Álvarez said, "The plan overall was patience, that was basically it -- to have patience. We knew it was going to be five, six rounds, and it was going to take some time for me to get him. I'm new at this weight, new in this division. Much credit to him. He's a great fighter, but we stuck to our game plan. It was delayed a little bit, but overall, it was successful." Kovalev was gracious in defeat, "I'll be back. I'll be back much stronger. I know that I can be a unified champion. Nobody wants to fight me in my division. This guy [Álvarez] is more fresh. He came into my division more fresh. He has more stamina, but it's OK. It's a good experience for me." Kovalev went to hospital for precautionary purposes.

Álvarez's purse for the fight as part of his DAZN deal was $35 million. Kovalev received a base purse of $3 million, however would earn more from the $12 million his promoter received from Golden Boy Promotions. Álvarez admitted it would be difficult to lose weight to safely get back down to 73 kg (160 lb) and was keeping his options open.

Immediately after the bout, many fight fans started asking Kovalev on social media about why he allegedly took a dive. The former champion answered via several videos on his Instagram page,:

"It was impossible for me to win that fight because of all the demands and contract clauses I have signed, and my physical conditioning problems. But financially it was very interesting for me... so, yeah, I accepted the fight I was not supposed to win."

Álvarez responded by calling Kovalev a "bad loser".

For his 2019 campaign, Álvarez was named the fighter of the year by The Ring Magazine, ESPN, Sports Illustrated, and the Boxing Writers Association of America.

=== Return to super middleweight ===
On 6 November 2020, Álvarez was released from his contract with Golden Boy Promotions after a lawsuit was settled for breach of contract.

==== Álvarez vs. Callum Smith ====
On 17 November via social media, Álvarez announced he would be facing undefeated WBA (Super) and The Ring super middleweight champion Callum Smith on 19 December 2020, with the vacant WBC title also at stake. The fight was held at the Alamodome in San Antonio, Texas. Álvarez's trainer Eddy Reynoso revealed that his fighter had been sparring with undefeated heavyweight Frank Sánchez in preparation for the bout. On the night, Álvarez controlled the action over twelve rounds, inflicting Smith with a detached left biceps injury as he won by unanimous decision with scores of 119–109, 119–109, 117–111. After the win Canelo became a four division world champion.

==== Álvarez vs. Yıldırım ====
It was announced on 20 January 2021 that Álvarez would be defending his titles against WBC mandatory challenger Avni Yıldırım on 27 February at the Hard Rock Stadium, Miami Gardens, Florida. The bout attracted criticism due to many perceiving Yıldırım, who had not been in the ring since he lost a technical split decision to Anthony Dirrell two years prior in February 2019, to be vastly over-matched. Yıldırım had been named to the mandatory position as a result of the controversial nature of his loss to Dirrell, however, he had remained sidelined due to injury and the COVID-19 pandemic. Álvarez, who was mandated to face Yıldırım in order to retain the WBC title despite being heavily favored, was dismissive of the critics, saying "I really don't have to give any explanation because they're never gonna be happy with anything... He [Yıldırım] has lots of courage. He can be dangerous at any moment because he is a strong fighter."

In a one-sided fight, Álvarez defeated Yıldırım by third-round corner retirement after Yıldırım's corner threw in the towel at the end of the third round. According to CompuBox stats, Álvarez outlanded Yıldırım 67 (40%) to 11 (11%) in total punches and 58 (59%) to 4 (22%) in power punches. In the third round, Álvarez threw 53 power punches. Álvarez later stated that he had contracted COVID-19 prior to the fight and only had one month to train.

==== Álvarez vs. Saunders ====
After Álvarez's successful defense against Avni Yıldırım, promoter Eddie Hearn confirmed Álvarez would be facing WBO titleholder and undefeated two-weight world champion Billy Joe Saunders in a unification bout on 8 May at the AT&T Stadium in Arlington, Texas. Prior to the fight, there was a dispute between the two fighters' camps regarding the size of the ring: Saunders was unhappy with the proposed 18 ft (5.5 m) ring. He instead wanted a 20 ft (6.1 m) ring and threatened to pull out of the fight if his request wasn't met, despite having boxed primarily in 20 ft (6.1 m) rings in his bouts in the past in the United Kingdom. He ultimately settled for a 22 ft (6.7 m) ring after Álvarez said, "I don't care about the size of the ring, I'm just gonna go in there and do my job. It's not the only excuse he's had. He's had plenty of excuses," referencing when Saunders had previously voiced his concerns about the selection of judges for the fight.

In front of a record breaking crowd of 73,126 for boxing attendance at an indoor facility in the United States, Álvarez won via eighth-round corner retirement when Saunders' team threw in the towel due to Saunders having suffered a fractured orbital bone as a result of an uppercut landed by Álvarez. At the time of the stoppage, Álvarez was winning on the scorecards 78–74 (twice) and 77–75. Throughout the fight, Álvarez outlanded Saunders 73 to 60 in total punches and landed 53% of his power punches.

The bout set the record for the largest attendance for an indoor boxing match in US history, surpassing the record set by Leon Spinks vs. Muhammad Ali II in 1978.

In the immediate post-fight press conference, Álvarez was confronted by undefeated WBO middleweight champion Demetrius Andrade who asked him when they were going to fight, before accusing Álvarez of ducking him. Álvarez responded to him in English dismissively, calling him a "horrible fighter", and criticizing his resume: "Man, you fight with nobody. You are a champion but you fight with nobody." Before Andrade was removed from the press conference, Álvarez told him, "Get the fuck outta here. Please, get the fuck outta here. Get the fuck outta here because I'm gonna fuck you up right now motherfucker."

==== Álvarez vs. Plant ====
After months of negotiations, Álvarez announced on his social media on 19 August 2021 that he would be facing undefeated IBF champion Caleb Plant on 6 November at the MGM Grand Garden Arena in Las Vegas, in an undisputed showdown for all four major world titles in the super middleweight division, with the winner set to become the first ever undisputed champion at that weight class. On 21 September 2021, the two fighters were engaged in a brief onstage scuffle during their first press conference, in which Álvarez initiated physical contact during their face-off when he shoved Plant. Álvarez stated that he had done this because he took offense to Plant's use of the word "motherfucker", interpreting it as an insult to his mother. Plant denied to reporters that he had used the common American curse word in that context. Moreover, he drew attention to Álvarez's hypocrisy, accurately indicating that Álvarez had previously used the same slur against Demetrius Andrade on the night of 8 May 2021 in the aftermath of his fight against Billy Joe Saunders in Arlington, Texas.

On fight night, Álvarez won the bout via eleventh-round technical knockout. He had knocked his opponent to the canvas with a left hook right uppercut combination in the penultimate round, before closing in to drop Plant again, prompting referee Russell Mora to call off the bout. At the time of the stoppage, Álvarez was ahead on the scorecards with 98–92, 96–94, and 97–93. With this win, he became the first fighter to unify all four belts at super middleweight division.

=== Return to light heavyweight ===
==== Álvarez vs. Bivol ====
At the WBC Convention on 15 November 2021 in Mexico City, the WBC approved the request of Álvarez's trainer and manager, Eddy Reynoso, to have Álvarez challenge Ilunga Makabu for his WBC cruiserweight title. Álvarez has never competed at cruiserweight, so Reynoso had needed to petition the WBC to allow the title fight. The cruiserweight limit was 200 lb (91 kg), but it had recently been reduced to 190 lb (86 kg) by the WBC due to the introduction of bridgerweight. The fight had been rumored to take place in May 2022. This ultimately did not materialize, as Makabu was forced into a mandatory defense of his title in a rematch against Thabiso Mchunu on 29 January 2022, which Makabu won via split decision. Instead, it was announced on 25 February 2022 that Álvarez had signed a two-fight deal with Matchroom Boxing; the first fight would see him returning to the light heavyweight division to challenge undefeated WBA (Super) champion Dmitry Bivol on 7 May in a bout that would be televised as sports streaming service DAZN's first pay-per-view offering in the United States and Canada.

In an upset, all three judges scored the bout 115–113 in Bivol's favor to hand Álvarez the second defeat of his professional career. Bivol fought behind the jab in the opening round while Álvarez attacked his body. Álvarez gained Bivol's attention when he landed a clean right uppercut on his chin to close the fourth round. Bivol used his excellent footwork and took control of the fight during the middle rounds. Bivol was warned by referee Russell Mora in the seventh round for pushing Álvarez down. He was not deducted any points. Álvarez began to tire from round 8 as Bivol continued to outwork him.

Bivol's arms were bruised due to Álvarez's tactics, the same tactic he had used in his win over Callum Smith where he targeted his arms. Bivol said, "He beat my arm up but not my head. He kept hitting me in the arms, and I kept hitting him in the face ... I expect that. I watched the fight against Callum Smith." Bivol claimed he was the best in the division and apologised to his promoter Eddie Hearn, who had recently had the Álvarez-Golovkin trilogy fight signed for September 2022. Speaking after the fight, Álvarez planned to activate the rematch clause in the contract. He said, "It doesn't end like this. No excuses, I lost today; he is a great boxer ... I felt his power. He comes in and he goes out. He manages his distance really well." This was also Álvarez's first professional loss since 2013 and was on a 16-fight unbeaten streak. He felt Bivol only won 5 rounds.

According to CompuBox punch statistics, Bivol had outlanded Álvarez in every round of the fight, for a total of 152 punches landed out of 710 thrown (21%), compared to Álvarez's 84 of 495 (17%). Many media reporters and pundits drew attention to the judges' official scorecards: all three judges had scored Álvarez the winner of the first four rounds, something that was roundly criticized, and described by ESPN reporter Mike Coppinger as "puzzling". Despite the widespread public opinion that Bivol was the deserved winner, Álvarez initially disagreed with this notion, stating in his post-fight interview: "I don't feel like I lost the fight... Personally, I felt he [Bivol] only won four or five rounds." He later acknowledged defeat and alluded to an issue hampering his training regimen, "It’s another reason, but I don’t want to say anything and make any excuses. I lost and that’s it. I got tired and that’s it. I couldn’t train like usually, but it is what it is." He went on to express his desire to fight Bivol again: "We want the rematch, and we're going to do better in the rematch."

According to Dan Rafael, the PPV did 520,000 buys worldwide generating between $35 million to $40 million in revenue. The PPV numbers were much lower than the 1 million they had forecasted. According to reports, Álvarez was to take home a $15 million base up, rising up to $53 million. Bivol was guaranteed $2 million base up to $5 million, depending on PPV revenue, his highest career purse.

Despite this, a rematch between Álvarez and Bivol did not materialize immediately, as the former opted to face WBA (Super) and IBF middleweight champion Gennady Golovkin in a trilogy bout as his opponent for his next fight instead.

=== Return to super middleweight ===
==== Álvarez vs. Golovkin III ====
Despite Álvarez expressing his desire to avenge his loss against WBA (Super) light heavyweight champion Dmitry Bivol in a rematch, on 24 May 2022 it was announced that Álvarez would instead be returning to the super middleweight division to defend his undisputed titles against Gennady Golovkin in a trilogy bout on 17 September. The bout would see Golovkin, the WBA (Super) and IBF middleweight champion, compete in the super middleweight division for the first time in his career, while it was Álvarez's sixth bout in the same weight class.

In the first pre-fight press conference on 25 June 2022 in Los Angeles, Álvarez described the rivalry between him and Golovkin as "personal" rather than simply competitive. Álvarez stated of his opponent: "He always pretends to be a nice guy but he's an asshole. He's an asshole person... He's talking a lot of things about me. That's why it's personal." Álvarez went on to express his excitement at the prospect of sending his opponent into retirement, and admitted that he received gratification from making Golovkin wait four years for a trilogy bout on his own terms, in his preferred weight class of super middleweight: "It makes me feel good."

On fight night, Álvarez defeated Golovkin via unanimous decision with the scores of 115–113 (twice) and 116–112.

==== Álvarez vs. Ryder ====
On 14 March 2023, it was announced that Álvarez would be making the second defense of his undisputed super middleweight titles against WBO interim champion John Ryder at Estadio Akron in his hometown of Guadalajara, Mexico on 6 May. The bout would mark Álvarez's first bout in his home nation in over eleven years.

Álvarez won via unanimous decision after the judges scored the fight 118–109 (twice) and 120–107 in his favor after 12 rounds.

==== Álvarez vs. Charlo ====
Instead of defending his titles against his mandatory challenger Tim Tszyu, Jermell Charlo (35–1–1, 19 KOs) moved up two-weight divisions to challenge Álvarez on 30 September in Las Vegas. In order to make the fight, Álvarez, signed a 3-fight deal with Charlo's handlers, PBC. For months, rumours circulated Álvarez would be fighting Jermall Charlo, so the news that he was fighting Jermell came as a shock to many in the boxing industry, mostly because Charlo had never competed above 154 pounds at championship level. The fight was billed as "Undisputed vs. Undisputed". The WBO would allow Charlo to enter the ring and be announced as the undisputed light middleweight champion, however, after the first bell rung, he would be stripped of the WBO title, elevating Tszyu to full championship status. For this fight, Álvarez moved his full training camp to Lake Tahoe, a high-altitude location, rather than his usual camp in San Diego. Both boxers weighed the same 167.4 pounds for the fight, a career-high for Charlo.

Both fighters were cautious early, but from the second round Álvarez would largely control the pace the bout, backing Charlo into the ropes and landing heavy punches to the body. About a minute into the 7th round, Álvarez sent Charlo on to his knee with a right hook and right uppercut. It was just the second time that Charlo had been knocked down in his career. Charlo beat the count but by this time, appeared to be focused on just trying to survive and see the final bell. Whenever Álvarez cut inside, Charlo moved out of range without engaging. At the end of 12 rounds, all three judges scored the bout for Álvarez with scores of 119–108, 118–109 and 118–109 giving him a unanimous decision victory.

During the post-fight interviews, Álvarez said, "Nobody can compete with this Canelo. Two months in the mountains [training near Lake Tahoe] without my family. I still love boxing. I love boxing so f---ing much. Boxing is my life. Boxing made me the person I am today." When asked who he would like to fight next, Álvarez replied, "Whoever. I don't f---ing care." According to CompuBox, Álvarez landed 134 of 385 punches thrown (35%) compared to Charlo, who landed 71 of his 398 thrown (18%).

Álvarez was asked about Terence Crawford being a potential opponent in the future, to which he responded, "You know, I always say if the fight make sense, why not? But he is not in the plan. ... You know, like I say, if it makes sense, maybe. I don’t know right now. I just wanna enjoy this fight and please, let me enjoy this fight. And then you’re gonna know what is next for sure."

According to Dan Rafael, the PPV sold up to 700,000 units, generating $59,500,000 in revenue, which was in the top 3 PPV's for the year after Davis-Garcia sold 1.2 million and Spence-Crawford sold around 700,000 PPV's.

==== Álvarez vs. Munguía ====
On 27 February 2024, it was reported that Canelo would defend his undisputed super middleweight title against Jaime Munguia on 4 May in Las Vegas, Cinco de Mayo weekend. The fight was confirmed on 12 March 2024. Despite a bright start from Munguia, Canelo managed to halt Munguia's momentum by scoring a knockdown in the fourth round. In what appeared to be a competitive fight, it was Canelo who ultimately won the fight by unanimous decision, with the scores of (117–110, 116–111, 115–112).

==== Álvarez vs. Berlanga ====
Álvarez defended his WBA, WBC and WBO super middleweight titles against Edgar Berlanga at T-Mobile Arena in Las Vegas on 14 September 2024. He had been stripped of his IBF title after failing to defend the belt against mandatory challenger William Scull. Álvarez won the fight by UD, knocking down Berlanga in the third round.

==== Álvarez vs. Scull ====
In February 2025, it was reported that an agreement was in place for Álvarez to defend his super middleweight titles against Terence Crawford (41–0, 31 KOs) in a mega-fight in September 2025. Both boxers had met with Turki Alalshikh separately and agreed personal terms. The fight would headline a Riyadh Season card, likely scheduled for a venue in Las Vegas. Early rumours reported the Allegiant Stadium as the frontrunner to host the event. Álvarez had been ignoring call outs from Crawford and Alalshikh since 2024 for a fight. A few days later, Ring Magazine reported the fight was cancelled. Álvarez began negotiations to fight Jake Paul and on 7 February, the plans fell through when it was announced that Álvarez signed a 4-fight deal with Riyadh Season, which meant the Crawford fight was back on.

On 8 February 2025 it was reported that Álvarez will fight William Scull for the undisputed super-middleweight title on 3 May in Riyadh, Saudi Arabia. Álvarez won the bout by unanimous decision with the judges scoring the fight 115–113, 116–112, and 117-110 all to Álvarez. Both boxers' performances were regarded by the media as underwhelming for their lack of action. The fight set a new record for the fewest punches thrown in a 12-round fight tracked by CompuBox in the punch counter's 40-year history, with just 445 punches: Canelo throwing 152 and Scull throwing 293.

==== Álvarez vs. Crawford ====
Following his win over Scull, Álvarez was joined in the ring by Crawford as their fight was formally announced. On 10 June, the fight was announced, to take place on 13 September, streaming live on Netflix. On 17 June, the Allegiant Stadium was officially confirmed as the host venue. At the kick-off presser, Al-Sheikh announced there would be a knockout bonus for future Riyadh Season cards promoted by him. He said, "We will not have [Tom & Jerry fights ] anymore," Al-Sheikh said. "We will have in this fight and our next fights a bonus for a KO." starting with the Álvarez-Crawford fight. Dana White later stated it would be an "over six figures" bonus. At the official weigh-ins, both fighters came in at 167.5 lb (76 kg), the highest weight of Crawford's career.

Crawford fought the entire contest from the southpaw stance and delivered a composed and tactically sharp performance to defeat Álvarez and become undisputed champion. Although Álvarez entered as the naturally bigger man, his power never appeared to trouble Crawford, who absorbed Álvarez's hardest punches while dictating the fight's rhythm. The opening rounds were tightly contested. The fourth round produced Álvarez's first significant success when he snapped Crawford's head back with a right hand, but Crawford took it well. Álvarez carried the momentum into the fifth, his best round of the early fight, as he controlled distance and outworked Crawford from range. The sixth marked the turning point. Crawford stood his ground, landed effectively on the inside, and connected with a clean hook to Álvarez's chin that forced him backward. Referee Thomas Taylor issued Álvarez a warning for a low blow with 1:20 to go in the sixth, but no points were deducted. From then on, Crawford controlled the tempo, mixing his jab and combinations with well-timed counters. Crawford reasserted control in the championship rounds, out landing Álvarez in the eleventh and trading freely in the twelfth without being troubled by Álvarez's power. After twelve rounds, the judges returned a unanimous decision for Crawford, 116–112, 115–113 and 115–113. According to CompuBox, Crawford out landed Álvarez 115–99 in total punches and 45–16 in jabs, while Álvarez led 83–70 in power shots.

70,482 people attended the event, shattering the previous record for Las Vegas boxing attendance when 29,214 fans attended the 1982 fight between Larry Holmes and Gerry Cooney, and ranking as the second-largest indoor boxing crowd in U.S. history. It was the third largest gate in boxing history, pulling in $47,231,887. The fight was watched by 41,400,000 people, making it the most watched championship boxing match of the 21st century.

Some weeks after the loss, Ring Magazine reported that Álvarez was scheduled to undergo elbow surgery on 23 October 2025, in California. The procedure was intended to address loose bodies in his left elbow. Following the surgery, he anticipated a return to light training within 4 to 6 weeks. The prognosis for his return to championship-level boxing was optimistic, with expectations for a comeback in the second or third quarter of 2026. Álvarez was originally planning on making a ring return in February 2026.

==== Álvarez vs. M'billi ====
In January 2026, alongside Turki Al-Sheikh, Álvarez announced that he would headline the inaugural event promoted by Canelo Promotions titled "Mexico Against the World," in Riyadh on 12 September 2026. Announcing the event, Al-Sheikh said, "It will be named 'Mexico Against the World.' All the fighters from the team of Canelo [Álvarez] against the world. And [Álvarez] in the main event [for] a world title, and it will be a surprise in Saudi Arabia, Inshallah.” Álvarez did activate the rematch clause against Crawford; however, Crawford announced his retirement in December 2025. On 16 April, Álvarez began his training camp. At the time, Canadian boxer Christian M'billi (29–0–1, 24 KOs), who was elevated to full championship status by the WBC, was the favourite to land the fight with Álvarez. This all depended on whether the WBC would enforce a rematch between M'billi and Lester Martinez, following their draw in 2025. On 30 April, Ring Magazine officially announced that Álvarez would challenge M'billi for his WBC title in his first title defence. On 28 June, it was reported that the fight date had been postponed to take place at the end of October 2026. The following month, the date was confirmed as 31 October. Álvarez stated that he postponed the fight because he needed to prioritize family matters before beginning preparations for the fight. On September 29, Al-Sheikh officially confirmed the fight would take place in Riyadh. It was also confirmed that both boxers had entered VADA drug-testing, via the WBC Clean Boxing Program. There were some concerns regarding regional security, and reports that some fighters on the undercard had not yet received contracts. Despite an attack on the King Khalid International Airport on October 10, where there was reported casualties, Al-Sheikh revealed that Álvarez had reached out to him to confirm he would still be fighting in Riyadh. A week before the fight, the United States ordered the departure of non-essential embassy personnel and their families from Saudi Arabia due to the escalating tensions. Al-Sheikh stated that the event would take place "no matter what happens". Mbilli weighed 167.8 pounds and Álvarez came in slightly lighter at 167.6 pounds.

Álvarez subsequently won the WBC super middleweight title for a second time, defeating M'billi via unanimous decision with a scorecard of 115–112, 116–111, and 117–110, in his favor. According to CompuBox, Álvarez landed 158 of 504 punches thrown (31%) and Mbilli landed 127 of his 724 throw (18%). In eight of the rounds, Álvarez out-landed Mbilli. During the post-fight Álvarez said that Mbilli never troubled him, “I knew he’s a strong fighter. And he don’t throw a lot of punches because it’s difficult to throw punches with me.” He was pleased with the game his team worked on with him during the fight.

== Commercial endorsements ==
In March 2012, Álvarez became the first boxer to sign a multi-year apparel agreement with Under Armour. He entered an exclusive gloves-and-equipment contract with Everlast in February 2014. Tecate selected Álvarez to front its "Born Bold" campaign in February 2016, marking the brewer's first endorsement of an individual athlete. LVMH-owned cognac brand Hennessy added the boxer to its global "Never Stop. Never Settle." platform in September 2017. Swiss watchmaker Roger Dubuis appointed him brand ambassador in December 2018 and later issued a limited-edition Excalibur "Canelo" timepiece. In May 2025, Álvarez was named global ambassador for the online sportsbook 1win, under a multi-year agreement.

== Personal life ==
Álvarez is Catholic. He was engaged to Marisol González, who is Miss Mexico Universe 2003 and a sports reporter for Televisa Deportes. In May 2021, Álvarez married his longtime partner Fernanda Gómez in a ceremony at the Guadalajara Cathedral in Guadalajara, Mexico. He has three daughters and one son, all with different women.

He is an avid car collector, owning a Ferrari LaFerrari, a Bugatti Chiron, a Lamborghini Aventador SVJ, a Shelby Mustang, a Mercedes-AMG G 63 6x6, a Rolls Royce Ghost, and a Tesla Model X. He also owns several motorcycles, including Harleys and Ducatis.

Álvarez enjoys playing golf; in 2020 he stated his intentions to retire from boxing by age 37 and "dedicate himself to his business and playing golf every day" in retirement.

Álvarez is involved in several business ventures including real estate and convenience stores. He served as executive-producer for the film The Long Game (2023). He is also a boxing promoter in Mexico. His company, Canelo Promotions, was established in 2010 and his business partners are his trainers, father-and-son team Chepo and Eddy Reynoso. As of 2013, Canelo Promotions represented 40 boxers throughout Mexico.

He is also involved in philanthropic work, particularly in his home country. He has supported various charitable organizations and causes, specifically those focused on helping underprivileged children and families.

Álvarez made a cameo appearance in Creed III (2023), and features on the cover of the boxing video game Undisputed.

Álvarez endorsed Claudia Sheinbaum as president of Mexico in 2024.

== Professional boxing record ==
69 fights	64 wins	3 losses
By knockout	39	0
By decision	25	3
Draws	2	

No.	Result	Record	Opponent	Type	Round, time	Date	Location	Notes
69	Win	64–3–2	Christian M'billi	UD	12	31 Oct 2026	ANB Arena, Riyadh, Saudi Arabia	Won WBC super middleweight title
68	Loss	63–3–2	Terence Crawford	UD	12	13 Sep 2025	Allegiant Stadium, Paradise, Nevada, U.S.	Lost WBA (Super), WBC, IBF, WBO, and The Ring super middleweight titles
67	Win	63–2–2	William Scull	UD	12	3 May 2025	ANB Arena, Riyadh, Saudi Arabia	Retained WBA (Super), WBC, WBO, and The Ring super middleweight titles; Won IBF super middleweight title
66	Win	62–2–2	Edgar Berlanga	UD	12	14 Sep 2024	T-Mobile Arena, Paradise, Nevada, U.S.	Retained WBA (Super), WBC, WBO, and The Ring super middleweight titles
65	Win	61–2–2	Jaime Munguía	UD	12	4 May 2024	T-Mobile Arena, Paradise, Nevada, U.S.	Retained WBA (Super), WBC, IBF, WBO, and The Ring super middleweight titles
64	Win	60–2–2	Jermell Charlo	UD	12	30 Sep 2023	T-Mobile Arena, Paradise, Nevada, U.S.	Retained WBA (Super), WBC, IBF, WBO, and The Ring super middleweight titles
63	Win	59–2–2	John Ryder	UD	12	6 May 2023	Estadio Akron, Zapopan, Mexico	Retained WBA (Super), WBC, IBF, WBO, and The Ring super middleweight titles
62	Win	58–2–2	Gennady Golovkin	UD	12	17 Sep 2022	T-Mobile Arena, Paradise, Nevada, U.S.	Retained WBA (Super), WBC, IBF, WBO, and The Ring super middleweight titles
61	Loss	57–2–2	Dmitry Bivol	UD	12	7 May 2022	T-Mobile Arena, Paradise, Nevada, U.S.	For WBA (Super) light heavyweight title
60	Win	57–1–2	Caleb Plant	TKO	11 (12), 1:05	6 Nov 2021	MGM Grand Garden Arena, Paradise, Nevada, U.S.	Retained WBA (Super), WBC, WBO, and The Ring super middleweight titles; Won IBF super middleweight title
59	Win	56–1–2	Billy Joe Saunders	RTD	8 (12), 3:00	8 May 2021	AT&T Stadium, Arlington, Texas, U.S.	Retained WBA (Super), WBC, and The Ring super middleweight titles; Won WBO super middleweight title
58	Win	55–1–2	Avni Yıldırım	RTD	3 (12), 3:00	27 Feb 2021	Hard Rock Stadium, Miami Gardens, Florida, U.S.	Retained WBA (Super), WBC, and The Ring super middleweight titles
57	Win	54–1–2	Callum Smith	UD	12	19 Dec 2020	Alamodome, San Antonio, Texas, U.S.	Won WBA (Super), The Ring, and vacant WBC super middleweight titles
56	Win	53–1–2	Sergey Kovalev	KO	11 (12), 2:15	2 Nov 2019	MGM Grand Garden Arena, Paradise, Nevada, U.S.	Won WBO light heavyweight title
55	Win	52–1–2	Daniel Jacobs	UD	12	4 May 2019	T-Mobile Arena, Paradise, Nevada, U.S.	Retained WBA (Super), WBC, and The Ring middleweight titles; Won IBF middleweight title
54	Win	51–1–2	Rocky Fielding	TKO	3 (12), 2:38	15 Dec 2018	Madison Square Garden, New York City, New York, U.S.	Won WBA (Regular) super middleweight title
53	Win	50–1–2	Gennady Golovkin	MD	12	15 Sep 2018	T-Mobile Arena, Paradise, Nevada, U.S.	Won WBA (Super), WBC, and vacant The Ring middleweight titles
52	Draw	49–1–2	Gennady Golovkin	SD	12	16 Sep 2017	T-Mobile Arena, Paradise, Nevada, U.S.	Retained The Ring middleweight title; For WBA (Super), WBC, and IBF middleweight titles
51	Win	49–1–1	Julio César Chávez Jr.	UD	12	6 May 2017	T-Mobile Arena, Paradise, Nevada, U.S.	
50	Win	48–1–1	Liam Smith	KO	9 (12), 2:28	17 Sep 2016	AT&T Stadium, Arlington, Texas, U.S.	Won WBO light middleweight title
49	Win	47–1–1	Amir Khan	KO	6 (12), 2:37	7 May 2016	T-Mobile Arena, Paradise, Nevada, U.S.	Retained WBC and The Ring middleweight titles
48	Win	46–1–1	Miguel Cotto	UD	12	21 Nov 2015	Mandalay Bay Events Center, Paradise, Nevada, U.S.	Won The Ring and vacant WBC middleweight titles
47	Win	45–1–1	James Kirkland	KO	3 (12), 2:19	9 May 2015	Minute Maid Park, Houston, Texas, U.S.	
46	Win	44–1–1	Erislandy Lara	SD	12	12 Jul 2014	MGM Grand Garden Arena, Paradise, Nevada, U.S.	
45	Win	43–1–1	Alfredo Angulo	TKO	10 (12), 0:44	8 Mar 2014	MGM Grand Garden Arena, Paradise, Nevada, U.S.	
44	Loss	42–1–1	Floyd Mayweather Jr.	MD	12	14 Sep 2013	MGM Grand Garden Arena, Paradise, Nevada, U.S.	Lost WBC and The Ring light middleweight titles; For WBA (Super) light middleweight title
43	Win	42–0–1	Austin Trout	UD	12	20 Apr 2013	Alamodome, San Antonio, Texas, U.S.	Retained WBC light middleweight title; Won WBA (Unified) and vacant The Ring light middleweight titles
42	Win	41–0–1	Josesito López	TKO	5 (12), 2:55	15 Sep 2012	MGM Grand Garden Arena, Paradise, Nevada, U.S.	Retained WBC light middleweight title
41	Win	40–0–1	Shane Mosley	UD	12	5 May 2012	MGM Grand Garden Arena, Paradise, Nevada, U.S.	Retained WBC light middleweight title
40	Win	39–0–1	Kermit Cintrón	TKO	5 (12), 2:53	26 Nov 2011	Plaza de Toros, Mexico City, Mexico	Retained WBC light middleweight title
39	Win	38–0–1	Alfonso Gómez	TKO	6 (12), 2:36	17 Sep 2011	Staples Center, Los Angeles, California, U.S.	Retained WBC light middleweight title
38	Win	37–0–1	Ryan Rhodes	TKO	12 (12), 0:48	18 Jun 2011	Arena VFG, Guadalajara, Mexico	Retained WBC light middleweight title
37	Win	36–0–1	Matthew Hatton	UD	12	5 Mar 2011	Honda Center, Anaheim, California, U.S.	Won vacant WBC light middleweight title
36	Win	35–0–1	Lovemore N'dou	UD	12	4 Dec 2010	Estadio Universitario Beto Ávila, Veracruz, Mexico	Retained WBC Silver light middleweight title
35	Win	34–0–1	Carlos Baldomir	KO	6 (10), 2:58	18 Sep 2010	Staples Center, Los Angeles, California, U.S.	Retained WBC Silver light middleweight title
34	Win	33–0–1	Luciano Leonel Cuello	TKO	6 (12), 1:23	10 Jul 2010	Arena VFG, Guadalajara, Mexico	Won vacant WBC Silver light middleweight title
33	Win	32–0–1	José Cotto	TKO	9 (10), 2:51	1 May 2010	MGM Grand Garden Arena, Paradise, Nevada, U.S.	
32	Win	31–0–1	Brian Camechis	KO	3 (12), 0:23	6 Mar 2010	Palenque de la Feria, Tuxtla Gutiérrez, Mexico	Retained NABF welterweight title
31	Win	30–0–1	Lanardo Tyner	UD	12	5 Dec 2009	Tepic, Mexico	Retained NABF welterweight title
30	Win	29–0–1	Carlos Herrera	TKO	1 (10), 2:46	15 Sep 2009	Auditorio Siglo XXI, Puebla, Mexico	Retained WBC Youth welterweight title
29	Win	28–0–1	Marat Khuzeev	KO	2 (10), 2:33	8 Aug 2009	Auditorio Benito Juárez, Zapopan, Mexico	Won vacant WBC Youth welterweight title
28	Win	27–0–1	Jefferson Gonçalo	KO	9 (12), 1:54	6 Jun 2009	Xcaret Park, Cancún, Mexico	Retained NABF welterweight title
27	Win	26–0–1	Michel Rosales	TKO	10 (12), 2:53	11 Apr 2009	Gimnasio Niños Héroes, Tepic, Mexico	Retained NABF welterweight title
26	Win	25–0–1	Euri González	TKO	11 (12), 1:36	21 Feb 2009	Auditorio Benito Juárez, Zapopan, Mexico	Retained NABF welterweight title; Won WBO Latino welterweight title
25	Win	24–0–1	Antonio Fitch	TKO	1 (12), 1:52	17 Jan 2009	Foro Scotiabank, Mexico City, Mexico	Won vacant NABF welterweight title
24	Win	23–0–1	Raúl Pinzón	TKO	1 (12), 2:30	5 Dec 2008	Miccosukee Resort & Gaming, Miami, Florida, U.S.	Retained WBA Fedecentro welterweight title
23	Win	22–0–1	Larry Mosley	UD	10	24 Oct 2008	Morongo Casino Resort & Spa, Cabazon, California, U.S.	
22	Win	21–0–1	Carlos Adán Jerez	UD	10	2 Aug 2008	Auditorio Benito Juárez, Zapopan, Mexico	Retained WBA Fedecentro welterweight title
21	Win	20–0–1	Miguel Vázquez	UD	10	28 Jun 2008	Palenque Calle 2, Zapopan, Mexico	
20	Win	19–0–1	Francisco Villanueva	SD	10	6 Jun 2008	Tepic, Mexico	
19	Win	18–0–1	Gabriel Martinez	RTD	11 (12), 3:00	18 Apr 2008	Salon Marbet Plus, Ciudad Nezahualcóyotl, Mexico	Won vacant WBA Fedecentro welterweight title
18	Win	17–0–1	Francisco Villanueva	TKO	9 (12), 2:32	14 Mar 2008	Coliseo Olimpico de la UG, Guadalajara, Mexico	Retained Jalisco welterweight title
17	Win	16–0–1	Axel Rodrigo Solis	KO	1 (8), 2:55	22 Feb 2008	Salon Marbet Plus, Ciudad Nezahualcóyotl, Mexico	
16	Win	15–0–1	Sean Holley	TKO	2 (10), 3:00	15 Dec 2007	Auditorio Benito Juarez, Guadalajara, Mexico	
15	Win	14–0–1	Ricardo Cano	UD	12	31 Aug 2007	Coliseo Olímpico, Guadalajara, Mexico	Won Jalisco welterweight title
14	Win	13–0–1	Christian Solano	UD	10	18 Aug 2007	Arena Coliseo, Guadalajara, Mexico	
13	Win	12–0–1	Jesus Hernandez	TKO	2 (10), 0:12	1 Jun 2007	Casino de los Fresnos, Tepic, Mexico	
12	Win	11–0–1	Víctor Marquez	KO	4 (10), 1:48	19 May 2007	Auditorio Benito Juarez, Guadalajara, Mexico	
11	Win	10–0–1	Ivan Illescas	KO	4 (10), 2:40	30 Mar 2007	Arena-Casino Los Fresnos, Tepic, Mexico	
10	Win	9–0–1	Javier Martinez	TKO	8 (10), 1:54	2 Mar 2007	Casino Los Fresnos, Tepic, Mexico	
9	Win	8–0–1	Daniel Martinez	KO	2 (8), 2:59	8 Dec 2006	Arena Jalisco, Guadalajara, Mexico	
8	Win	7–0–1	Francisco Villanueva	KO	5 (6), 1:20	29 Sep 2006	Tonalá, Mexico	
7	Win	6–0–1	Cristian Hernandez	KO	2 (6), 0:34	15 Sep 2006	Guadalajara, Mexico	
6	Win	5–0–1	Juan Hernandez	KO	2 (6), 0:07	21 Jul 2006	Arena Coliseo, Guadalajara, Mexico	
5	Draw	4–0–1	Jorge Juarez	SD	4	17 Jun 2006	Auditorio Fausto Gutierrez Moreno, Tijuana, Mexico	
4	Win	4–0	Pedro Lopez	KO	1 (4), 2:33	10 Feb 2006	Men's Club, Guadalajara, Mexico	
3	Win	3–0	Miguel Vázquez	SD	4	20 Jan 2006	Guadalajara, Mexico	
2	Win	2–0	Pablo Alvarado	KO	2 (4), 2:25	26 Nov 2005	Arena Chololo Larios, Tonalá, Mexico	
1	Win	1–0	Abraham Gonzalez	TKO	4 (4), 0:18	29 Oct 2005	Arena Chololo Larios, Tonalá, Mexico	

== Titles in boxing ==
=== Major world titles ===
- WBC light middleweight champion (154 lb (70 kg))
- WBO light middleweight champion (154 lb (70 kg))
- WBA (Super) middleweight champion (160 lb (73 kg))
- WBC middleweight champion (160 lb (73 kg)) (2×)
- IBF middleweight champion (160 lb (73 kg))
- WBA (Super) super middleweight champion (168 lb (76 kg))
- WBC super middleweight champion (168 lb (76 kg)) (2x)
- IBF super middleweight champion (168 lb (76 kg)) (2×)
- WBO super middleweight champion (168 lb (76 kg))
- WBO light heavyweight champion (175 lb (79 kg))

=== Secondary major world titles (Note: The secondary champion lineage lists the Regular or Unified champions while the primary champion is occupied.) ===
- WBA (Unified) light middleweight champion (154 lb (70 kg))
- WBA (Regular) super middleweight champion (168 lb (76 kg))

=== The Ring magazine titles ===
- The Ring light middleweight champion (154 lb (70 kg))
- The Ring middleweight champion (160 lb (73 kg)) (2×)
- The Ring super middleweight champion (168 lb (76 kg))

=== Silver world titles (Note: In 2010, the WBC created the "Silver Championship", intended as a replacement for interim titles.) ===
- WBC Silver light middleweight champion (154 lb (70 kg))

=== Regional/International titles ===
- Jalisco welterweight champion (147 lb (67 kg))
- WBA Fedecentro welterweight champion (147 lb (67 kg))
- NABF welterweight champion (147 lb (67 kg))
- WBO Latino welterweight champion (147 lb (67 kg))

=== Undisputed titles ===
- Undisputed super middleweight champion (Note: The first ever undisputed super middleweight champion.) (168 lb (76 kg)) (2×)

=== Honorary titles ===
- WBA Man of Triumph Gold champion
- WBC Diamond middleweight champion
- WBC Franchise middleweight champion
- WBO Super Champion
- WBC Huichol I champion
- WBC Chiapaneco II champion
- WBC Maya I champion
- WBC Mestizo champion
- WBC Teotihuacan champion
- WBC Guerrero Jaguar Zapoteca champion
- WBC Puebla-Jalisco champion
- WBC Puebla champion
- WBC Tamaulipas I champion
- WBC Tamaulipas II champion
- WBC Xicotencatl champion

== Boxing awards ==
- The Ring magazine Fighter of the Year: 2019, 2021
- Sugar Ray Robinson Award: 2019, 2021
- Best Boxer ESPY Award: 2019
- ESPN Fighter of the Year: 2015, 2019, 2021
- Sports Illustrated Fighter of the Year: 2019, 2021
- BoxingScene Fighter of the Year: 2019, 2021
- WBN Fighter of the Year: 2021
- WBN Fight of the Year: 2018 Álvarez vs. Golovkin II
- WBN Knockout of the Year: 2015
- WBN Comeback of the Year: 2022
- WBN Young Fighter of the Year: 2010
- WBN World Title Prospect of the Year: 2010

== Viewership ==
=== Netflix ===
No.	Date	Fight	Live Gate	Peak Viewers	Ref.
1	13 September 2025	Álvarez vs. Crawford	$47,231,887	41,400,000	

=== Pay-per-view bouts ===
United States
No.	Date	Fight	Billing	Buys	Network	Revenue
1	14 September 2013	Mayweather vs. Canelo	The One	2,200,000	Showtime	$150,000,000
2	8 March 2014	Canelo vs. Angulo	Toe to Toe	350,000	Showtime	$20,000,000
3	12 July 2014	Canelo vs. Lara	Honor and Glory	300,000	Showtime	$18,000,000
4	21 November 2015	Cotto vs. Canelo	Cotto–Canelo	900,000	HBO	$58,000,000
5	7 May 2016	Canelo vs. Khan	Power vs. Speed	600,000	HBO	$30,000,000
6	17 September 2016	Canelo vs. Smith	Canelo–Smith	300,000	HBO	$20,000,000
7	6 May 2017	Canelo vs. Chávez	Civil War	1,000,000	HBO	$80,000,000
8	16 September 2017	Canelo vs. Golovkin	Supremacy	1,300,000	HBO	$110,000,000
9	15 September 2018	Canelo vs. Golovkin II	Final Judgment	1,100,000	HBO	$120,000,000
10	6 November 2021	Canelo vs. Plant	Road to Undisputed	800,000	Showtime	$64,000,000
11	7 May 2022	Canelo vs. Bivol	Legacy is Earned	520,000	DAZN	$36,400,000
12	17 September 2022	Canelo vs. Golovkin III	The Trilogy	550,000	DAZN	$79,500,000
13	6 May 2023	Canelo vs. Ryder	The King is Coming Home	450,000	DAZN	$29,250,000
14	30 September 2023	Canelo vs. Charlo	Undisputed vs Undisputed	650,000 to 700,000	Showtime	$59,500,000
15	4 May 2024	Canelo vs. Munguia	Canelo-Munguia	560,000	Amazon Prime Video/DAZN	$50,400,000
16	14 Sep 2024	Canelo vs. Berlanga	Canelo-Berlanga	650,000	Amazon Prime Video/DAZN	$58,500,000
	Total sales			12,280,000		$983,550,000

=== Subscription sports streaming service bouts ===
No.	Date	Fight	Network
1	15 December 2018	Canelo vs. Fielding	DAZN
2	4 May 2019	Canelo vs. Jacobs	DAZN
3	2 November 2019	Canelo vs. Kovalev	DAZN
4	19 December 2020	Canelo vs. C. Smith	DAZN
5	27 February 2021	Canelo vs. Yıldırım	DAZN
6	8 May 2021	Canelo vs. Saunders	DAZN
7	7 May 2022	Canelo vs. Bivol	DAZN
8	17 September 2022	Canelo vs. Golovkin III	DAZN
9	6 May 2023	Canelo vs. Ryder	DAZN
10	4 May 2024	Canelo vs. Munguia	Amazon Prime Video/DAZN
11	14 September 2024	Canelo vs. Berlanga	Amazon Prime Video/DAZN

== See also ==
- List of undisputed world super-middleweight boxing champions
- List of world light-middleweight boxing champions
- List of world middleweight boxing champions
- List of world super-middleweight boxing champions
- List of world light-heavyweight boxing champions
- List of boxing quadruple champions
- List of boxing families
- List of Mexican boxing world champions

== Notes ==
Sporting positions
Regional boxing titles
Vacant Title last held by Joel Julio	WBA Fedecentro welterweight champion 18 April 2008 – January 2009; Vacated	Vacant Title next held by Hugo Valdez
Vacant Title last held by Jesús Soto Karass	NABF welterweight champion 17 January 2009 – July 2010; Vacated	Vacant Title next held by Shawn Porter
Vacant Title last held by Jorge Daniel Miranda	WBO Latino welterweight champion 21 February 2009 – April 2009; Vacated	Vacant Title next held by Diosbelys Hurtado
Vacant Title last held by Oliver Guettel	WBC Youth welterweight champion 8 August 2009 – July 2010; Vacated	Vacant Title next held by Danny García
New title	WBC Silver light middleweight champion 10 July 2010 – 5 March 2011; Won world title	Vacant Title next held by Vanes Martirosyan
World boxing titles
Vacant Title last held by Manny Pacquiao	WBC light middleweight champion 5 March 2011 – 14 September 2013	Succeeded by Floyd Mayweather Jr.
New title Unified against Austin Trout	WBA light middleweight champion Unified title 20 April 2013 – 14 September 2013; Failed to win Super title	Title discontinued
Vacant Title last held by Winky Wright	The Ring light middleweight champion 20 April 2013 – 14 September 2013	Succeeded by Floyd Mayweather Jr.
Vacant Title last held by Miguel Cotto	WBC middleweight champion 21 November 2015 – 18 May 2016; Vacated	Succeeded by Gennady Golovkin
Preceded by Miguel Cotto	The Ring middleweight champion 21 November 2015 – 12 June 2018; Stripped	Vacant Title next held by Himself
Preceded by Liam Smith	WBO light middleweight champion 17 September 2016 – 21 May 2017; Vacated	Vacant Title next held by Miguel Cotto
Preceded by Gennady Golovkin	WBA middleweight champion Super title 15 September 2018 – 1 January 2021; Vacated	Vacant Title next held by Ryōta Murata
Preceded by Gennady Golovkin	WBC middleweight champion 15 September 2018 – 26 June 2019; Promoted to Franchise champion	Succeeded by Jermall Charlo
Vacant Title last held by Himself	The Ring middleweight champion 15 September 2018 – 2 January 2021; Vacated	Vacant
Preceded by Rocky Fielding	WBA super middleweight champion Regular title 15 December 2018 – 19 December 2020; Won Super title	Vacant Title next held by David Morrell
Preceded by Daniel Jacobs	IBF middleweight champion 4 May 2019 – 1 August 2019; Stripped	Vacant Title next held by Gennady Golovkin
Preceded by Sergey Kovalev	WBO light heavyweight champion 2 November 2019 – 17 December 2019; Vacated	Vacant Title next held by Joe Smith Jr.
Preceded by Callum Smith	WBA super middleweight champion Super title 19 December 2020 – 13 September 2025	Succeeded by Terence Crawford
Vacant Title last held by David Benavidez	WBC super middleweight champion 19 December 2020 – 13 September 2025	Succeeded by Terence Crawford
Preceded by Callum Smith	The Ring super middleweight champion 19 December 2020 – 13 September 2025	Succeeded by Terence Crawford
Preceded by Billy Joe Saunders	WBO super middleweight champion 8 May 2021 – 13 September 2025	Succeeded by Terence Crawford
Preceded by Caleb Plant	IBF super middleweight champion 6 November 2021 – 26 July 2024; Stripped	Vacant Title next held by William Scull
Inaugural champion	Undisputed super middleweight champion 6 November 2021 – 26 July 2024; Titles fragmented	Vacant Title next held by Himself
Preceded by William Scull	IBF super middleweight champion 3 May – 13 September 2025	Succeeded by Terence Crawford
Vacant Title last held by Himself	Undisputed super middleweight champion 3 May – 13 September 2025	Succeeded by Terence Crawford
Preceded by Christian M'billi	WBC super middleweight champion 31 October 2026 – present	Incumbent
Awards
Previous: Daniel Jacobs	ESPN Prospect of the Year; 2010	Next: Gary Russell Jr.
Previous: Terence Crawford	ESPN Fighter of the Year; 2015	Next: Carl Frampton
Previous: Carl Froch; KO8 George Groves	The Ring Knockout of the Year; KO3 James Kirkland; 2015	Next: Canelo Álvarez; KO6 Amir Khan
Previous: Wladimir Klitschko; KO5 Kubrat Pulev	ESPN Knockout of the Year; KO3 James Kirkland; 2015	Next: Hassan N'Dam N'Jikam; KO1 Alfonso Blanco
Previous: Canelo Álvarez; KO3 James Kirkland	The Ring Knockout of the Year; KO6 Amir Khan; 2016	Next: David Lemieux; KO3 Curtis Stevens
Previous: Anthony Joshua vs. Wladimir Klitschko	The Ring Fight of the Year vs. Gennady Golovkin II; 2018	Next: Naoya Inoue vs. Nonito Donaire
Previous: Oleksandr Usyk	The Ring Fighter of the Year; 2019	Next: Tyson Fury and Teófimo López
Previous: Oleksandr Usyk	BWAA Fighter of the Year; 2019	Next: Teófimo López
Previous: Tyson Fury and Teófimo López	The Ring Fighter of the Year; 2021	Next: Dmitry Bivol
Achievements
Preceded by Vasyl Lomachenko	The Ring pound for pound #1 boxer 7 November 2019 – 7 May 2022	Succeeded by Oleksandr Usyk
Preceded by Vasyl Lomachenko	BWAA pound for pound #1 boxer 18 December 2019 – 26 June 2022	Succeeded by Terence Crawford
