= Fight of the Year =

Fight of the Year is an award given to the boxing match considered to be the best fight that year. It is awarded by a variety of different institutions. It may refer to:

- The Ring magazine Fight of the Year – awarded by The Ring magazine
- Ali–Frazier Award – the Boxing Writers Association of America's fight of the year

== See also ==
- Sugar Ray Robinson Award (formerly known as the Edward J. Neil Trophy) – the Boxing Writers Association of America's Fighter of the Year
- The Ring magazine Fighter of the Year
- The Ring magazine Knockout of the Year
- Best Boxer ESPY Award
- Best Fighter ESPY Award
