= Terence Crawford =

American boxer (born 1987)

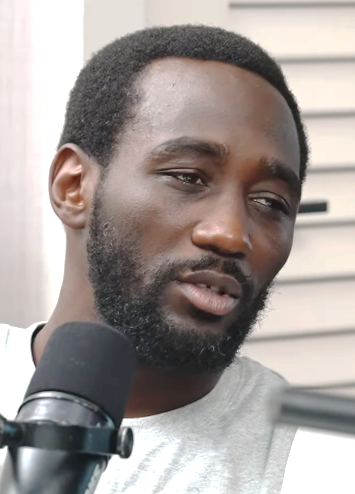
- Crawford in 2023

Personal information
- Nickname: Bud
- Born: Terence Allan Crawford; September 28, 1987 (age 39) Omaha, Nebraska, U.S.
- Height: 5 ft 8 in (173 cm)
- Weight: Lightweight; Light welterweight; Welterweight; Light middleweight; Super middleweight

YouTube information
- Channel: Terence "Bud" Crawford
- Website: tbudcrawford.com

Signature
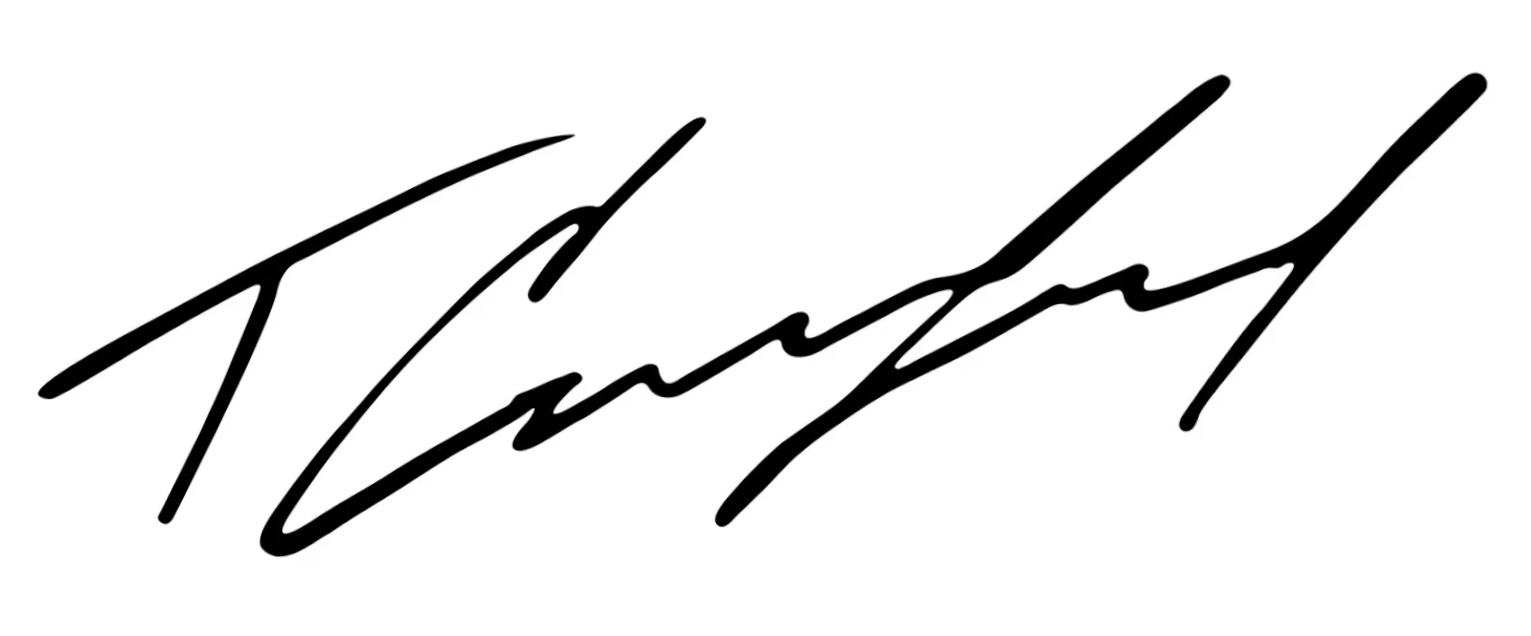

Boxing career
- Reach: 74 in (188 cm)
- Stance: Southpaw (Note: Listed by BoxRec as southpaw, but regularly switch-hits as an orthodox.)

Boxing record
- Total fights: 42
- Wins: 42
- Win by KO: 31
Medal record
Men's amateur boxing
Blue & Gold National Championships
| Gold medal – first place | 2006 Carson | Lightweight |
Golden Gloves
| Silver medal – second place | 2006 Omaha | Lightweight |
U.S. National PAL Championships
| Gold medal – first place | 2006 Oxnard | Lightweight |
U.S. National Championships
| Bronze medal – third place | 2006 Colorado Springs | Lightweight |
| Bronze medal – third place | 2007 Colorado Springs | Lightweight |
U.S. Pan American Box-Offs
| Gold medal – first place | 2007 Colorado Springs | Lightweight |
Pan American Games Qualifier
| Bronze medal – third place | 2007 Rio de Janeiro | Lightweight |

Terence Allan "Bud" Crawford (born September 28, 1987) is an American former professional boxer who competed from 2008 to 2025. He retired with an undefeated record of 42–0. Crawford won 18 major world championships in five weight classes from lightweight to super middleweight, including the undisputed championships (Note: Four-belt era: World Boxing Association (WBA) (Super version), World Boxing Council (WBC), International Boxing Federation (IBF), and World Boxing Organization (WBO) titles.) at light welterweight, welterweight, and super middleweight. He is the second male boxer in history to become a three-weight undisputed world champion. (Note: Joining Henry Armstrong, who accomplished the feat simultaneously.) In 2025, The Ring magazine ranked Crawford as the third greatest boxer of the 21st century, pound for pound.

In 2014, Crawford traveled overseas to face Ricky Burns and won his first world championship, the WBO lightweight title. After two successful defenses, he moved up to light welterweight in 2015 and defeated Thomas Dulorme to claim the vacant WBO light welterweight title. In 2017, Crawford became the undisputed light welterweight champion—the first since Kostya Tszyu in 2004—and the first boxer in any weight class to simultaneously hold all four major world titles since Jermain Taylor in 2005. In 2023, he defeated Errol Spence Jr. to become the undisputed welterweight champion, the first since Zab Judah in 2006. (Note: Three-belt era: World Boxing Association (WBA) (Undisputed version), World Boxing Council (WBC), and International Boxing Federation (IBF) titles.) In 2024, Crawford moved up to light middleweight and defeated Israil Madrimov to become a four-division world champion. In 2025, he defeated Canelo Álvarez by unanimous decision to capture the undisputed super middleweight championship, becoming one of only six male boxers in history to win world titles in five divisions.

In the four-belt era, Crawford became the first male boxer to capture the undisputed championship in two (Note: Crawford would later be joined in this achievement by Naoya Inoue and Oleksandr Usyk.) and three divisions, and the first to achieve undisputed status at both light welterweight and welterweight. He is the only boxer in history to hold The Ring magazine title in four divisions and joined Manny Pacquiao and Floyd Mayweather Jr. as the only fighters to become four-division lineal champions. Crawford is also one of only two boxers to have won world titles at both lightweight and super middleweight. (Note: Joined Dingaan Thobela.) Throughout his 17-year professional career, Crawford was never knocked down, nor did a single judge ever score a fight in favor of his opponent. His streak of 11 consecutive knockouts in world title fights is tied for the third longest in boxing history. (Note: Tied with Naoya Inoue, Roberto Durán, and Naseem Hamed; Behind Gennady Golovkin and Wilfredo Gómez.)

Consistently ranked among the top boxers of his generation, Crawford is widely regarded as one of the greatest boxers of all time. He was named Fighter of the Year by the Boxing Writers Association of America (BWAA) in 2014 and 2025, by ESPN in 2014, 2017, and 2025, and by The Ring magazine in 2025. Crawford received the Best Fighter/Boxer ESPY Award in 2018, 2024, and 2026. He was recognized as the world's top pound-for-pound boxer by the BWAA from October 2017 to May 2018, again in June 2022, and by The Ring from July 2023 to May 2024 and again from September to December 2025. In January 2026, Sportico ranked Crawford 21st among the world's highest-paid athletes of 2025, with estimated earnings of $66 million.

== Early life ==
Crawford was born and raised in Omaha, Nebraska, as the only son born to Debbie and Terence Sr. He grew up in a dangerous area known for poverty, crime, and violence, which made it difficult for him to navigate in his youth. The Crawford family frequently faced financial challenges, often struggling to afford basic necessities.

At an early age, he was often involved in physical altercations and was kicked out of five different schools because of it. As his father was in the U.S. Navy, he was rarely home, leaving his mother to raise him by herself. She often beat him with a belt and even tried paying neighborhood kids to pummel him, although none succeeded.

Crawford found solace in boxing at the C.W. Boxing Club in North Omaha. His grandfather, father, and uncle had all trained there. The gym's owner, Carl Washington, who was also Crawford's neighbor, approached Crawford when he was seven years old, recommending he join the gym. Crawford began frequenting the gym, and was eventually mentored by Midge Minor, who became a father figure to him. He constantly picked up Crawford after school and paid close attention to him, fearing that he may become involved in the rampant crime in the area. Introduced to wrestling by a close family friend, Crawford embraced the sport early on, developing skills that later shaped his distinctive, wrestling-influenced boxing style.

In 2001, Crawford began training under Brian "Bomac" McIntyre and Esaú Diéguez, who remained his trainers.

== Amateur career ==
Crawford took up boxing at the age of seven. He fought 70 official amateur bouts, losing 12 times. As an amateur, he defeated future world champions Mikey Garcia and Danny Garcia, as well as Diego Magdaleno, whom he beat three times. After winning three amateur tournaments shortly before the 2008 Olympics, he became the highest-ranked lightweight in the US. However, his loss to leading contender Sadam Ali thwarted his Olympic ambitions. His amateur record was 58–12.

=== Highlights ===
- 2006 National PAL Championships, 132 lbs – Gold Medalist
  - Preliminaries: Defeated Miguel Ángel González (W 4)
  - Preliminaries: Defeated James Villa (RSC-2)
  - Quarterfinals: Defeated Stan Martyniouk (22–11)
  - Semifinals: Defeated Javier Garcia (7–4)
  - Finals: Defeated Diego Magdaleno (13–8)
- 2006 Blue & Gold National Championships, 132 lbs – Gold Medalist
  - Quarterfinals: Defeated Jose Fernandez (RSC)
  - Semifinals: Defeated Paul Green (5–0)
  - Finals: Defeated Danny Garcia (3–2)
- 2006 National Golden Gloves, 132 lbs – Silver Medalist
  - Preliminaries: Defeated Angelo Ward (5–0)
  - Preliminaries: Defeated DeMarco McCrady (5–0)
  - Quarterfinals: Defeated Rashad Ganaway (5–0)
  - Semifinals: Defeated Carlos Molina (3–2)
  - Finals: Lost to Jesus Mendez (2–3)
- 2006 U.S. National Championships, 132 lbs – Bronze Medalist
  - Preliminaries: Bye
  - Preliminaries: Defeated Mikey Garcia (18–7)
  - Quarterfinals: Defeated Stan Martyniouk (17–13)
  - Semifinals: Lost to Danny Garcia (20–21)
- 2007 U.S. Pan American Box-Offs, 132 lbs – Gold Medalist
  - Semifinals: Defeated Luis Ramos Jr. (25–15)
  - Finals: Defeated Diego Magdaleno (24–13)
- 2007 1st Pan American Games Qualifier, 132 lbs – Bronze Medalist
  - Preliminaries: Defeated Jose Maria Virula (19–7)
  - Quarterfinals: Defeated Luis Ernesto Rueda (20–15)
  - Semifinals: Lost to Yordenis Ugás (10–27)
- 2007 U.S. National Championships, 132 lbs – Bronze Medalist
  - Preliminaries: Bye
  - Preliminaries: Bye
  - Quarterfinals: Defeated Miguel Ángel González (25–24)
  - Semifinals: Lost to Jerry Belmontes (9–10)

== Professional career ==
=== Lightweight ===
==== Early career ====
Crawford made his professional debut on March 14, 2008, fighting as a lightweight (130 lb (59 kg) - 135 lb (61 kg)) and knocking out Brian Cummings in the first round. He compiled a record of 19–0 with 15 wins by way of knockout (KO) against largely unheralded opposition.

Crawford's first notable bout was against Breidis Prescott on the undercard of the second fight between Brandon Ríos and Mike Alvarado. Prescott was originally scheduled to face WBA light welterweight champion Khabib Allakhverdiev, who withdrew with an injured elbow. Crawford was originally supposed to meet Robert Osiobe on the same card, but accepted the offer to fill in for Allakhverdiev on three-days notice. Crawford defeated the Colombian by a unanimous decision. Crawford received a purse of $125,000, whilst Prescott received $50,000. This was the first time Crawford fought a ten-round fight at the 140 lb. limit.

==== Crawford vs. Sanabria ====
Crawford fought Alejandro Sanabria on June 15, 2013. Held at the American Airlines Center in Dallas, Texas, the fight served as an eliminator for the WBO lightweight title and was also for the vacant WBO-NABO lightweight title.

After a slow start in rounds one and two, Crawford outlanded Sanabria 2–1 in power shots over the next three frames. The fight ended just after the bell rang to start the sixth round. Crawford charged forward, landing a precise left hook to Sanabria's jaw that sent him crashing to the canvas, headfirst, in a forward roll. Though Sanabria was able to return to his feet at the count of seven, he was left staggered, which caused the fight to be waved off by referee Laurence Cole, giving Crawford a technical knockout (TKO) victory.

==== Crawford vs. Klimov ====
On August 21, 2013, it was announced that Crawford would fight undefeated Russian boxer and WBO #12 ranked Andrey Klimov in another elimination bout, which would see the winner challenge WBO champion Ricky Burns. The fight was scheduled for ten rounds and took place on the undercard of Miguel Cotto vs. Delvin Rodriguez on HBO at the Amway Center in Orlando, Florida, on October 5. Klimov was coming off a majority decision (MD) win over fringe contender John Molina Jr. in June 2013.

After ten rounds, all three judges scored the fight 100–90 in Crawford's favour, Klimov's first defeat as a professional. According to CompuBox stats, Crawford landed 192 of 604 punches (32%), whilst Klimov landed 57 of 290 (20%). In the post-fight interview, Crawford spoke on how he went in and got the job done, "I outboxed him. It was easy all night long. I thought I was hurting him all night long. I was never in any trouble and I thought he was in trouble." Due to Klimov's lack of action, it prompted a member of his team to call him a 'coward' after round eight in the corner.

==== Crawford vs. Burns ====
Crawford traveled to Scotland five months later to take on 30 year old Ricky Burns for the WBO lightweight title on March 1, 2014. Burns' promoter, Eddie Hearn, said he was pleased to bring the fight to Scotland, and admitted it was Burns' toughest fight to date.

Both fighters were cautious in the opening round, with Burns' jab making the early impact. Crawford adjusted in the second, neutralizing Burns' jab, while the third round was a near draw. The action heated up in the fifth as Crawford began to showcase his offensive skills. Despite the tactical nature of the fight, with both boxers using feints, jabs, and lateral movement to disrupt each other, Crawford took control and set the pace. From that moment, the outcome seemed inevitable. Burns tried to stand his ground in the seventh, attempting to go toe-to-toe with Crawford, but Crawford's hard jab and aggressive approach soon took over. In the eighth, Crawford was punishing Burns with heavy shots. He continued to outwork and outland Burns in the championship rounds. By the twelfth, Crawford was pouring on the pressure, looking to finish, but Burns remained upright and saw the final bell.

Crawford won the fight, boxing well on the outside and picking his shots against Burns, becoming the first Nebraska native in 100 years to win a world title. The judges scored the fight 117–111, and 116–112 twice, all in favour of Crawford. Burns praised Crawford after the fight, simply stating, "The better man won." Over the twelve rounds, Crawford landed 213 of 811 punches thrown (26%) but landed 41% of his power punches. Burns landed 76 of his 552 thrown (14%) and landed no more than 7 power punches in total.

==== Crawford vs. Gamboa ====
Fighting for the first time as a professional in his hometown of Omaha, Nebraska, Crawford made his first title defense against 2004 Cuban Olympic gold medalist and former IBF featherweight champion Yuriorkis Gamboa. This was only the second title fight ever held in Omaha, the first being in 1972, when heavyweight champion Joe Frazier defeated the Omaha/Council Bluffs product Ron Stander by fourth-round TKO. Gamboa entered having not fought in over a year. The fight was announced on May 6 and took place at the CenturyLink Center on June 28, 2014. Crawford weighed in 134.8 pounds, slightly heavier than Gamboa at 134.4 pounds.

Gamboa won the early rounds using his speed advantage, but Crawford eventually adjusted, knocking Gamboa down once in the fifth round, again in the eighth, and finally twice in the ninth to secure a TKO victory in front of a sold-out hometown crowd of 10,943 fans. Crawford stated after the fight "I was warming up, getting used to his style in the first couple of rounds. I just wanted to test him out, I felt like I could make an adjustment with my jab, because he's always dropping his left hand. I thought I could get him with my jab in the southpaw stance." At the time of stoppage, Crawford was ahead 78–72, 78–72, 77–73 on the judges' scorecards. He landed 146 of 348 punches (42 percent) and Gamboa connected on 82 of 345 (24 percent). The show topped out at 1.286 million viewers. Both the peak and average audience figures were good for the highest-rated HBO Boxing After Dark telecast of 2014 to date. In an interview in July 2016, Crawford stated that Gamboa was still his toughest fight to date.

==== Crawford vs. Beltrán ====
Crawford made his second defense of the WBO title against The Ring magazine #1 contender Ray Beltrán. The winner of the bout would become The Ring's lightweight champion. The fight was held in front of 11,127 at The CenturyLink Center in Omaha, Nebraska on November 29, 2014.

Early in the fight, both Crawford and Beltran had their moments, with Crawford controlling the action through stance switching and a steady jab, while Beltran landed his powerful right hand occasionally. In the fourth, Beltran pushed Crawford back with a hard shot, but Crawford quickly regained control. This pattern repeated for several rounds, with Crawford asserting dominance each time. In the later rounds, Crawford pressed for a stoppage, but Beltran held his ground. Ultimately, there was no doubt who the top lightweight was. Crawford retained his world title earning a twelve-round UD win. The final judges' scorecards read 120–108, and 119–109 twice in favour of Crawford. After the fight, Crawford announced his intentions to leave the lightweight division to fight as a light welterweight. The fight averaged 836,000 viewers on HBO and peaked at 936,000 viewers. It was considered a disappointment because the co-feature which saw Evgeny Gradovich draw with Jayson Velez drew an average 865,000 viewers and peaked just over 1 million.

Crawford was named the 2014 'Fighter of the Year' by ESPN and the Boxing Writers Association of America, after dethroning Burns.

=== Light welterweight ===
==== Crawford vs. Dulorme ====
On March 6, 2015, ESPN reported that Crawford would debut as a light welterweight, challenging for the vacant WBO title at the College Park Center in Arlington, Texas, against 25 year old Thomas Dulorme on April 18. At the press conference, Crawford told Dulorme, "Come prepared because I am going to be ready. [The fans] should expect a spectacular victory. This is my second world title at a different weight, and I am really going to be up for it. I will be prepared. I am always ready and prepared for any fight."

Early in the bout, Dulorme was outworking Crawford. However, this was part of Crawford's strategy; he was relying on Dulorme to tire out, which eventually ended up occurring. By the fourth round, Crawford began using his jab more frequently, marking a shift in the fight's pace. Crawford's jab would serve as a strong setup for larger punches later in the fight. In the sixth round, Crawford feinted with the jab and then landed a left-right combination that hurt Dulorme, who staggered back and took a knee. He got back up but was dropped twice more in the same round. The second knockdown ended the fight, as Dulorme was unable to continue, and Crawford secured his first world title at 140 pounds. Referee Rafael Ramos stopped the fight at 1 minute, 51 seconds of the round. The fight averaged 1.004 million viewers on HBO.

==== Crawford vs. Jean ====
Top Rank announced on August 20 that Crawford would make his first defence at the CenturyLink Center in Omaha, Nebraska, on October 24 against Montreal based 33 year old contender Dierry Jean. Jean's only previous loss as a professional had come in 2014 against light welterweight titlist Lamont Peterson, in Peterson's hometown of Washington, D.C., after which Jean dropped down to lightweight where he won four fights in a row.

The first round was a typically cagey, measured start by Crawford up until the final seconds, when he switched to a southpaw stance and stuck Jean with a hard left and a right hook that sent him to the canvas. Dominating the middle rounds, Crawford pounced on Jean whenever he saw his guard drop even a little. He landed a couple of powerful hooks on Jean at the end of the ninth, sending him to the canvas for a second knockdown. Wobbly getting to his feet, it was clear he had nothing left in the 10th, forcing referee Tony Weeks to step in and stop the bout in front of an audience of 11,020. Crawford landed 169 total punches out of 533 thrown, and 40% of his power shots. Over the last three rounds, Crawford out-landed Jean 59 to 9.

After the fight, Crawford stated that he was ready for former eight-division world champion Manny Pacquiao, "I'm ready. Bob, make it happen. I'm ready. I'm gonna let my handlers, Cameron Dunkin and Brian McIntyre, talk to Bob Arum and Team Pacquiao, and let's see if we can make it happen." Crawford was ahead on all three judges' scorecards at the time of stoppage (89–80, 90–79 twice). The fight was broadcast on HBO, drawing an average of 1.071 million viewers and peaked at 1.2 million.

==== Crawford vs. Lundy ====
His next fight took place before a sell-out crowd of 5,092 at the Theater of Madison Square Garden on February 27, 2016, against Hank Lundy. Panned as a second-rate fight for the undefeated Crawford, the bout picked up considerable steam in the weeks leading up to the telecast as Lundy boldly predicted a knockout win.

Crawford quickly took control of the first four rounds of the fight. In the fifth round, Crawford landed a one-two combination capped by a powerful left that hurt Lundy. Wobbled, Lundy was quickly swarmed by Crawford, and another hard left sent him to the ropes and then the canvas. As Lundy struggled to rise, Crawford taunted him, keeping up the pressure. Lundy tried to fight back, but Crawford's assault was relentless, and referee Steve Willis stepped in to stop the bout, giving Crawford his second straight title defense. Crawford connected with 89 of 247 punches (36%), compared to 47 of 411 for Lundy (22%).

Crawford spoke out about his feud with Lundy on social media, "He and I had gone back and forth on Twitter for like a year. I just wanted to shut him up for good." Crawford earned $1.21 million and Lundy earned a $150,000 purse. Although there was a lot of tension pre-fight, Lundy approached Crawford after the fight and showed respect. The fight averaged 982,000 viewers on HBO and peaked just over 1 million viewers.

==== Crawford vs. Postol ====
On May 3, 2016, it was finally confirmed that Crawford and WBC champion Viktor Postol had officially signed a contract for the highly anticipated light welterweight unification fight on July 23 at the MGM Grand in Las Vegas. Both fighters entered the ring with a matched record of 28 wins, no losses. Both men also entered the MGM Grand Garden Arena for the first time in their respective careers. Crawford won by UD and unified two light welterweight world titles before a crowd of 7,027. Crawford also claimed the vacant Ring magazine title. Crawford scored two flash knockdowns in the fifth round, with all three scorecards reading 118–107 twice, and 117–108. Postol was penalised for rabbit punching in the eleventh round when he hit Crawford with a right hand behind the head for which Postol was penalized one point, adding to Crawford's advantage. With the victory, Crawford staked his indisputable claim to division supremacy and set himself up for bigger fights, possibly against a returning Manny Pacquiao. Over twelve rounds, Crawford landed 141 of his 388 punches thrown (36%), and Postol landed 83 of 244 thrown (34%).

In the post-fight interview, Postol praised Crawford, saying "I thought it was a good fight between two technicians, but he was quicker than me. He is one of the best fighters in the world. I just didn't have the answers for him." Crawford also praised his trainer Brian McIntyre, "Freddie Roach and Postol said that Freddie would outcoach my coach, but you tell 'em who got outcoached tonight." McIntyre revealed the plan was to keep Postol moving, which would have eliminated his jab and right hand. Crawford's purse for the fight was $1.3 million. Postol earned $675,000 for his part. Some sources stated the fight generated 60,000 PPV buys on HBO. A replay was shown later in the week and drew 378,000, considered a weak number.

==== Crawford vs. Molina ====
Crawford was not due to fight next until 2017, however due to the Golovkin-Jacobs fight being postponed to early 2017, this freed up the December 10 date for HBO. Arum confirmed Crawford would take the date and look at potential opponents, including the then IBF champion Eduard Troyanovsky and Antonio Orozco. Arum announced a deal was in place for a fight between Crawford and 33 year old contender John Molina Jr. on December 10, 2016, at Crawford's hometown at CenturyLink Center in Omaha, Nebraska. Molina had previously defeated Russian contender Ruslan Provodnikov by UD in a twelve-round June 2016 fight, in which he also claimed the vacant WBO International light welterweight title. Molina weighed 144lb at the official weigh-in which meant he lost the right to fight for Crawford's world titles. Had Crawford lost the fight, he would have not lost his belts. For the fight to go ahead, Molina gave $400,000 of his purse to Crawford, adding to his already agreed purse of $1.5m.

Crawford held onto his titles, stopping Molina in the eighth round in front of a large home crowd in Omaha. Crawford moved around the ring for most of the fight, jabbing, holding and pot-shotting Molina. Referee Mark Nelson halted the fight in the eight round after Molina received three consecutive hits to the head. In the post-fight interview, Crawford felt he should be the 2016 'Fighter of the Year' for his wins over Molina, Lundy and Postol, "I feel like I got it. I just have to wait until the results come in." Crawford also reiterated his desire to unify the division before a possible move up to welterweight. Crawford landed 184 punches from 419 thrown, Molina landed 41 of 287 thrown, a 14% connect rate. The fight drew an average 806,000 viewers and peaked at 871,000 viewers on HBO.

==== Crawford vs. Diaz ====
Bob Arum spoke to ESPN in early February 2017 about Crawford's next defence and possible opponents. He said that HBO had set a May 20 date for the fight and the venue would most likely be in Crawford's hometown, Omaha. Mexican boxer Antonio Orozco, one of Crawford's mandatory challengers and Olympic gold medalist Felix Diaz, who had been calling out Crawford, were the names mentioned. He went on to explain how Orozco's promoters seemed to have little interest in the fight. Lou DiBella, promoter of Diaz, was eager to make a fight happen. Arum spoke to The Ring on March 1 saying that Crawford's opponent had been narrowed down to Diaz or Adrian Granados. Amir Imam, ranked number 1 by the WBC was also in the mix, but Arum said that he found it difficult to make a deal with his promoter, Don King. Terms were finally agreed on March 22 for Crawford vs. Diaz at the Prudential Center in Newark, New Jersey, on May 20. Contracts were to be signed shortly after. A week after the fight was announced, the location was changed. The new venue was confirmed to be Madison Square Garden in New York City.

In front of a crowd of 8,026, Crawford retained his world titles after Diaz's trainer, Joel Díaz stopped the fight after round ten. Towards the end, Diaz did close to nothing, leaning against the ropes. This was mostly due to his vision, as his right eye was nearly closed and his left eye was also badly swollen. Crawford used his jab for most of the fight, and used it to control the pace and help him move around the ring in his southpaw stance. Joel Díaz said in the post-fight interview that he had pulled his fighter out because he was taking too much punishment. Also in the post-fight interview, Crawford said, "It's not up to me. But everybody wants to know who's the next guy that Terence Crawford wants to fight. I'll fight anybody. It doesn't matter who it is." He then called out Keith Thurman. Promoter Bob Arum mentioned Crawford would likely fight again in the summer, against Julius Indongo, where the winner would be crowned the undisputed light welterweight champion.

According to CompuBox punch stats, Crawford landed 193 of his 520 punches thrown (37.1%). In that figure, he landed 59.1% of his power punches (139 of 235 thrown). Diaz landed 69 of 346 (19.9%). At the time of stoppage, judges Glenn Feldman and Steve Weisfeld scored the bout 100–90 and judge Julie Lederman scores it 99–91, all in favour of Crawford. According to Nielsen, the fight averaged 961,000 viewers on HBO's World Championship Boxing and peaked at 1.036m viewers. It was the most viewed fight on HBO so far that year.

=== Undisputed light welterweight champion ===
==== Crawford vs. Indongo ====
On July 1, 2017, Top Rank announced that a light welterweight unification fight between Crawford, and WBA regular and IBF champion Julius Indongo was agreed upon to take place on August 19 at the Pinnacle Bank Arena in Lincoln, Nebraska, live on ESPN in the U.S. and Sky Sports in the U.K. WBA sanctioned the fight for WBA super title. With the unification of every major world title in boxing (WBA, WBC, IBF, WBO) will determine the light welterweight division's first undisputed champion since Kostya Tszyu in 2004, and the first time all the aforementioned titles have been at stake in a single fight since Bernard Hopkins vs. Jermain Taylor in 2005. Both fighters paid over $100,000 U.S. dollars in sanctioning fees. Crawford entered the fight as a heavy favourite to win.

In front of a home crowd of 12,121, Crawford became the undisputed champion at light welterweight after knocking out Indongo in round three. The final punch was a left hook to the right side of the body, which immediately dropped Indongo. Referee Jack Reiss counted to 10 and promptly called an end after 1 minute and 38 seconds. Indongo also touched the canvas during round one, but the referee ruled it a slip. Additionally, Indongo was knocked down and received a count after a left from Crawford during round two.

According to CompuBox stats, Crawford landed 26 of his 75 punches thrown (35%), while Indongo landed 13 of 74 thrown (18%). Both boxers earned an undisclosed 7-figure purse. Following the fight, Indongo stated "When he hit me like that, my mind was gone" about Crawford's body shot. Crawford stated that he had yet to make a decision on the next step in his career but there was speculation about him moving up to the welterweight division or defending his light welterweight titles against Mikey Garcia. The card averaged 965,000 viewers on ESPN.

Mere days after the fight, the IBF ordered a fight between Crawford and their mandatory challenger, Sergey Lipinets. Lipinets was named Indongo's mandatory challenger in December 2016, but Indongo was given an exemption to allow the unification fight with Crawford to happen. Lipinets stated that the IBF title was "stolen from him". As Crawford didn't plan to return to the ring before the IBF's deadline, he vacated the IBF title just 11 days after defeating Indongo. The IBF ordered Lipinets to face Akihiro Kondo for their vacant title.

On August 31, the WBA Championships Committee revealed that they had elevated Crawford to 'Super' champion. Article C18 of the WBA's rules stated that as Crawford holds all major titles at light welterweight, he could be elevated and deemed a 'Super' champion. The WBA, however, claimed to hold on to their policy of having only one champion per weight category and insisted an interim or regular title would not be created.

=== Welterweight ===
On October 26, 2017, Crawford officially vacated his WBO title to move up to the welterweight division. The WBO announced Crawford as the mandatory challenger to their titleholder Jeff Horn. With Horn scheduled to make a voluntary defence in December 2017 against British boxer Gary Corcoran, Crawford would not fight again in 2017. The winner of Horn vs. Cocoran was then ordered to schedule a fight against Crawford within 90 days. Arum stated he had dates in March and April 2018 on hold.

==== Crawford vs. Horn ====
Horn had won the WBO welterweight title in a very controversial decision win against Manny Pacquiao, after he had successfully made the first defence of his against Corcoran, this set up the fight between Crawford and Horn. Following his win, Horn was challenged to a big money fight at light middleweight by 42 year old Anthony Mundine, before eventually defending his WBO title against Crawford. Horn admitted his interest in the fight where he would be seeing a purse of around $2 million with his trainer, Glenn Rushton, also very much interested in the Mundine fight. On January 10, 2018, it was confirmed that all terms had been agreed upon for Horn to defend the WBO title in a mandatory defence against Crawford, after renegotiating the purses. The fight was being slated for April 21, 2018, at the T-Mobile Arena in Paradise, Nevada. On January 17, Arum stated the fight would likely take place at Madison Square Garden as there was no availability in Las Vegas for the dates required. In February, Arum claimed that due to other boxing events taking place around New York in April, the Crawford vs. Horn bout would take place in Las Vegas instead.

On March 14, it was reported that the fight would be postponed after Crawford suffered a hand injury whilst sparring. The fight was rescheduled to take place on June 9 at the MGM Grand Garden Arena in Paradise, Nevada. It was reported on May 24 that Horn had been involved in a car accident, involving three cars in Brisbane, however Horn himself confirmed that he was not hurt and did not suffer any injuries. Speaking to a newspaper, he said, "No one was badly hurt but it stunned me. Fortunately, I was in the car alone and my wife Jo and baby Isabelle were home. The accident was a shock but nothing is going to derail me from beating Terence Crawford. I'm very fit. I feel I'm going to peak right at fight time."

Crawford became a three-weight world champion in front of 8,112 fans in attendance after he eventually stopped Horn via TKO in round nine. At the time of the stoppage, all three judges had Crawford winning all the previous rounds. Horn lacked defense but kept coming forward, trying to look for an opening. Horn made the opening two rounds the most competitive with his aggressive style but Crawford adapted and remained the busier fighter throughout, landing the most telling shots of the bout. Horn was eventually dropped for the first time in round nine with an overhand left. After he got back up, Crawford landed a series of hard shots that caused referee Robert Byrd to stop the fight. The official time of the stoppage was 2 minutes and 33 seconds. After the bout, Crawford spoke about his welterweight debut, "Like I told you all before, I'm strong. I was way stronger than him. You all kept telling me how strong he was, so I had to go and show you. I just had to get in the ring and prove it. You saw what I did in there. My power carried up, my physicality. Now I want all the champions at welterweight." Promoter Bob Arum highly praised Crawford and compared him to Sugar Ray Leonard. According to CompuBox stats, Crawford landed 155 of 367 of punches thrown (42%). This included 47 power shots landed over the final two rounds. Horn, on the other hand, landed just 58 of 257 punches thrown (23%). Crawford earned a career-high $3 million purse and Horn also earned a career-high purse of $1.75 million.

==== Crawford vs. Benavidez ====
Crawford's first defense of the WBO title was slated to take place on October 13, 2018. Early reports stated his likely opponent would be former WBA interim light welterweight champion José Benavidez (27–0, 18 KOs). On September 6, despite having two years left of his contract, Crawford signed a new multi-year deal with Top Rank. On signing the extension, Crawford said, "I am the best fighter in the world, hands down. ESPN is the biggest brand in sports and Top Rank is the biggest promotional company in boxing. This was a no-brainer for me and my team. All of the super fights that the world wants to see will happen. Like I've said before, I want all of the champions in the welterweight division." The fight against Benavidez was also announced by Top Rank to take place at the CHI Health Center in Omaha, Nebraska.

In front of 13,323 in attendance, the largest crowd he had drawn to date, Crawford came on strong in the final round to score a twelfth-round KO win to retain his WBO welterweight title. The fight was halted at 2 minutes and 42 seconds. Crawford used an in-and-out style of fighting to land his shots and then got away before Benavidez could hit him. Towards the end of round twelve, Crawford knocked down Benavidez, who fought with an injured knee, with a left-right combination, the final punch being a right uppercut. After Benavidez got back to his feet, Crawford landed a flurry of punches until referee Celestino Ruiz stepped in. Crawford landed head and body combinations earlier in the fight which forced Benavidez to take a step back. Crawford credited the body shots, saying, "That takes something out of you every time. That's what slowed him down. You could tell every time he was shaking his head. I knew it would take its toll in the later rounds." At the time of stoppage, Crawford was ahead 110–99, 108–101 and 107–102 on all three judges' scorecards. According to CompuBox, Crawford landed 186 of 579 punches thrown (32%) and Benavidez landed 92 of his 501 thrown (18%). Benavidez landed 8 punches per round. CompuBox Historical showed that Crawford's previous 10 opponents landed only 7 per round. Crawford earned $3.625 million, his career-highest, compared to Benavidez's $500,000 purse. The near two-hour telecast averaged 2,245,000 viewers on ESPN.

==== Crawford vs. Khan ====
On November 16, Egidijus Kavaliauskas knocked out Roberto Arriaza in the third round of their bout. After the fight, Arum hinted Kavaliauskas would likely challenge Crawford for the WBO welterweight title in early 2019. Kavaliauskas stated he wanted to fight the best in the division and called out Crawford. A week later, it was reported 37 year old, former world champion Luis Collazo (38–7, 20 KOs) was in line to challenge Crawford, in what would be Crawford's first of three bouts in 2019. The fight would main event a Top Rank card on ESPN on March 23, 2019, at Madison Square Garden in New York. Prior to pursuing the fight with Collazo, Carl Moretti told RingTv they offered Danny García a guaranteed $3 million purse to fight Crawford on the same date on ESPN PPV, which would have included a share of the revenue generated. The offer was made to Angel García, who told Moretti he would discuss the offer with Danny, but ultimately never replied to Top Rank's offer. According to Moretti, the offer was made two weeks before García's fight with Adrián Granados was announced.

Although Collazo had agreed the terms to fight, Crawford was yet to sign the agreement. On December 3, it was reported that Top Rank had offered Amir Khan a guaranteed $5 million purse, plus a percentage of PPV revenue, to fight Crawford on March 23, 2019. Khan explained how he was considering the fight as it would be a good pay day and for the WBO welterweight title. He stated the fight with Kell Brook, who he was in negotiations with over a big domestic showdown, could still take place at a later date. On January 4, 2019, with no opponent announced, Crawford's scheduled return to the ring was pushed back to April 20, 2019. A few hours after, it was reported that Khan accepted Top Rank's offer to fight Crawford on April 20. A press conference was set for January 15, in London and the fight was made official to take place on ESPN PPV on April 20, 2019. Khan admitted it was a hard decision to make when choosing to fight Crawford over long-time rival Brook, as a bout with Crawford would see his legacy enhanced further. Khan also believed winning another world title against a consensus pound for pound boxer would be a bigger achievement than defeating Brook. Khan also revealed he would return to veteran trainer Virgil Hunter for the Crawford bout. Hunter was unable to train Khan for his previous two bouts due a health scare. After the pressers concluded, New York's Madison Square Garden was chosen as the venue for the bout. BT Sport in the U.K. picked up the event, announcing it would take place on their PPV platform.

The fight took place on April 20, in front of over 14,000 in attendance and ended in controversial circumstances when Crawford won by technical knockout in the sixth round due to an accidental low blow. Crawford knocked Khan down in the first round with a powerful overhand right towards the end of the round. Crawford continued to control the bout, utilizing his skills, speed, and power. He landed significant punches while Khan struggled to keep pace. The fight took a controversial turn in the sixth round, when Crawford landed an accidental low blow. Khan was given time to recover but notably chose not to continue, leading to the referee stopping the fight and awarding Crawford a TKO victory. The incident prompted debate regarding whether Khan was truly unable to continue or if he took the opportunity to exit a losing fight. At the time of the stoppage, Crawford led on all three scorecards, 50–44, and 49–45 twice. According to CompuBox, Crawford landed 88 of 211 punches thrown (41.7%) and Khan landed 44 of 182 thrown (24.2%). Khan was guaranteed a base purse of $5 million (£3.85m) with Crawford set to take home a minimum of $5.5m (£4.23m).

After the fight, Khan expressed his desire to continue but stated that he could not recover from the pain caused by the low blow. He rejected claims that he had quit, emphasizing his intention to fight until the end. His trainer, Virgil Hunter, supported Khan's decision, insisting that the fighter was indeed incapacitated and prioritizing his safety over continuing. Crawford was disappointed with the fight ending but remained firm about his position as the champion. He called out other fighters, expressing his interest in unification bouts.

==== Crawford vs. Kavaliauskas ====
Having called for the opportunity since November 2016, Egidijus Kavaliauskas eventually faced Crawford on December 14, 2019, at Madison Square Garden. Crawford set the tone from the opening bell with a sharp jab, establishing control over the pace and distance. The second round mirrored the first, a tightly contested technical battle between the two. In the third, Kavaliauskas seemed to stun Crawford as he came forward. Crawford went down, but the referee ruled it a slip. Staying composed, Crawford landed a combination when they exchanged punches. In the fourth, Crawford resumed his jab, throwing fluid combinations and pushing back his challenger, a strategy he maintained into the fifth.

Kavaliauskas mounted a challenge in the sixth, keeping the fight close, though Crawford retained the upper hand. By the seventh, they were exchanging heavy shots at close range, and Crawford dropped Kavaliauskas with a hook. However, the bell rang before he could finish. Crawford took control again in the eighth, using his superior boxing and precision punches. In the ninth, a barrage of strikes put Kavaliauskas down again, and a third knockdown soon followed, leading to the stoppage and Crawford's victory. At the time of the stoppage, Crawford had landed 128 total punches, while Kavaliauskas connected with 118—marking the most punches any opponent had landed against Crawford up to that point. Regarding the unscored knockdown, Crawford later admitted that it was in-fact a knockdown to a small group of reporters, saying "You scored a knockdown and got knocked out." According to The Athletic, Crawford took home a purse of $4 million for the bout.

==== Crawford vs. Brook ====
On August 25, 2020, Bob Arum revealed that discussions were ongoing for Crawford to face the Kell Brook, with November 14, 2020, being the targeted date. Crawford's camp first attempted to arrange a fight with Josesito López, who however opted to face Maurice Hooker. The fight was officially announced on October 6, 2020, and was held at the MGM Grand Conference Center in Paradise, Nevada. Crawford entered the fight as a significant favorite, with most odds-makers having him as a -1439 favorite.

Both boxers started slowly in the first round, with only a few jabs exchanged. The second round continued at a measured pace, with both landing punches in a tactical, close contest. Crawford found more success in the third, using his southpaw stance effectively. In the fourth, a powerful right hand dropped Brook as he stumbled backward, using the ropes to stay upright. Once the action resumed, Crawford relentlessly attacked, stopping the former IBF titlist at the 1:14 minute mark. He out-landed Brook 36 to 26 in total punches landed, and 20 to 12 in power punches landed. Brook was leading on the scorecards at the time of the stoppage, with two judges having the fight 29–28 in his favor, while the third judge awarded the same scorecard to Crawford.

The fight, which was broadcast by ESPN, drew an average audience of 2,029,000 viewers and attracted a peak audience of 2,078,000. Crawford earned $3 million for the bout, a 60% split of the purse.

==== Crawford vs. Porter ====
On July 22, 2021, the WBO ordered Crawford to defend his welterweight title against the #2 ranked WBO welterweight contender Shawn Porter. As the two sides were unable to negotiate the terms of the fight, the WBO set a purse bid for September 2, 2021, which was later postponed until September 14. Crawford and Porter would adhere to a 60–40 purse split, rather than the usual 80–20 split for mandated matches, taking into account the earnings from their three previous fights. On September 14, it was announced that a deal had been agreed to stage the fight on November 20 at Mandalay Bay in Las Vegas, airing on ESPN+ PPV. Porter came into the fight planning to retire and did so after the fight.

In a close competitive fight, both men were cut from accidental head clashes. In the tenth round, Crawford caught Porter coming in with a well-timed left uppercut, sending the latter to the canvas. Crawford scored another knockdown shortly after. Porter got up and wanted to continue but his corner threw in the towel, handing Crawford a tenth-round technical knockout victory. Crawford out-landed Porter in punches with 98 strikes to 79, although Porter had landed more power punches (67 to Crawford's 65). Crawford was leading on the judges' scorecards at the time of the stoppage, with scores of 86–85, 86–85 and 87–84. According to ESPN reports, Crawford earned upward of $6 million for the bout, a 60% split of the total fight purse. During his post-fight interview, Crawford announced his split with promoter Bob Arum and departure from Top Rank, opting instead to test free agency.

==== Crawford vs. Avanesyan ====
On October 21, 2022, Crawford was announced to make the sixth defense of his WBO welterweight championship against David Avanesyan on December 10, 2022, at the CHI Health Center in Omaha, Nebraska, that will headline a BLK Prime Boxing PPV.

In front of 14,630 fans, Crawford scored a sixth-round knockout against Avanesyan. The fight commenced with Crawford adopting a conventional stance but quickly transitioned to a southpaw position, which he maintained throughout the match. Avanesyan initiated the fight with an aggressive approach, landing several effective shots. However, Crawford gradually asserted control by implementing a focused body attack and utilizing movement to avoid incoming punches. The bout showcased competitive exchanges, particularly notable in rounds four and five, during which both fighters delivered significant strikes. In the sixth round, Crawford's combination of left uppercuts and body shots proved too much for Avanesyan, resulting in a knockout. The referee concluded the fight without administering a count. The loss marked the end of Avanesyan's six-fight knockout streak and represented his first challenge for a world title.

Crawford extended his streak to 10 consecutive knockouts and averaged an impressive 104.9 punches per round, significantly outpacing Avanesyan's 48.1. His 92 jab attempts in round two tied the all-time CompuBox record for welterweight, matching Antonio Margarito's round five performance against Joshua Clottey in December 2006. After the fight, Crawford stated it was a one-fight deal and he is still a free agent.

=== Undisputed welterweight champion ===
==== Crawford vs. Spence ====
Crawford and the WBA, IBF and WBC welterweight champion Errol Spence Jr. came to an agreement on "all material terms" for a title unification, which was expected to take place on November 19. The agreement included a bilateral rematch clause, with the winner of the bout earning the majority of the revenue in the rematch. Two months later, it was revealed by both camps that negotiations had fallen through and they would be pursuing different fights. Potential dates were given of the fight between both men as June 17 and July 22 but both have been proven false. Following this, on February 27, 2023, Crawford was ordered by the WBO to make a mandatory title defense against the once-defeated Alexis Rocha. Finally on May 25, 2023, it was confirmed that Crawford would fight Errol Spence Jr. for the undisputed welterweight titles on July 29, 2023, at the T-Mobile Arena in Las Vegas, Nevada. Spence had fought only 2 times in 4 years and was coming into the fight after 2 years of inactivity. He had also suffered 2 near death car accidents.

After a slow start in the first round, Crawford quickly took control of the fight. In the second, he dropped Spence with a counter jab followed by a straight left hand. "That was more of a flash knockdown," Crawford said of the second-round knockdown after the fight. "I caught him with the left. He didn't think I was coming back with the right." Spence managed to beat the count and kept trying to mount an offense, but Crawford's speed, precision, and power overwhelmed him throughout the fight. Crawford's jab was a standout weapon, not just a setup, but a dominant force that stopped Spence's momentum every time he tried to push forward.

As the rounds progressed, Spence struggled to get anything going. Crawford's jab and crisp straight left hands kept him on the defensive, leaving Spence with little chance to land an effective shot. Despite hitting the canvas twice in the seventh, Spence tried to rally, but Crawford's relentless attack left him reeling. By the ninth round, Crawford had completely broken Spence down, leaving the referee no other option than to stop the fight at 2:32 of the frame. By that point, he had out-landed Spence 185 to 96 in total punches and 98 to 63 in power punches.

In front of a sold-out crowd of 19,990, Crawford became the first undisputed welterweight champion since 2006 and the first male boxer in the four-belt era to claim undisputed championship status in two weight divisions. He also became the first boxer since Barney Ross in 1934 to capture lineal titles at lightweight, light welterweight, and welterweight. Crawford was up 79–70 on all three scorecards at the time of the stoppage. The PPV did around 700k buys, generating over $59 million in revenue.

After the fight, the IBF ordered Crawford to face its interim champion, Jaron Ennis. Because Spence exercised his rematch clause with Crawford, the IBF stripped Crawford of the title and made Ennis the full champion on November 9, 2023. In 2025, Spence stated that he would not have been prepared to compete within the timeframe required by the rematch agreement, saying: "I wouldn't have been ready, so how would I take a rematch if I'm not gonna be ready?"

=== Super welterweight ===
==== Crawford vs Madrimov ====
On April 20, 2024, it was reported that Crawford would move up a weight class to challenge Israil Madrimov for his WBA super welterweight title in Los Angeles on August 3, 2024. The WBC designated Crawford its welterweight champion in recess. Prior to the bout, Madrimov was a +600 underdog.

From the early rounds, it was clear that Madrimov would be a tough challenge for Crawford. With fast hands, solid footwork, and clever feints, Madrimov kept Crawford from settling into his usual rhythm, preventing him from letting his hands go as he has against other top fighters. Crawford maintained a southpaw stance throughout the fight, sticking to his jab and using it to set up straight lefts and powerful uppercuts. However, Madrimov capitalized on Crawford's vulnerability to straight right hands, making things difficult for the champion. The momentum swung back and forth throughout the fight, with one fighter gaining control for a few rounds before the other took over with his own strategy.

Ultimately, Crawford's strong push in the championships rounds won him the bout by unanimous decision, with scores of 116–112, 115-113 and 115–113, making him a 4 division world champion. This was the first fight since 2016 where Crawford had been taken the full 12 rounds. Madrimov believed he had done enough to secure the victory. According to CompuBox stats Crawford landed 95 of his 433 punches thrown, with 55 power punches landed and Madrimov landed 84 of his 275 punches thrown, with 65 of them being power shots.

On August 28, 2024, it was reported that WBO ordered the junior middleweight title fight between Crawford, who at that time held WBA and interim WBO titles, and Sebastian Fundora, who held WBC and WBO titles.

=== Undisputed super middleweight champion ===
==== Crawford vs Álvarez ====
In February 2025, it was reported that an agreement was in place for Crawford to challenge Saul 'Canelo' Álvarez (62–2–2, 39 KOs) for his undisputed super middleweight titles in a mega-fight in September 2025. Both boxers had met with Turki Alalshikh separately and agreed to terms. The fight would headline a Riyadh Season card, likely scheduled for a venue in Las Vegas. Early rumors reported Allegiant Stadium as the frontrunner to host the event. Álvarez had been ignoring call outs from Crawford and Alalshikh since 2024 for a fight. A few days later, The Ring magazine reported the fight was cancelled. Álvarez began negotiations to fight Jake Paul, and on February 7, the plans fell through when it was announced that Álvarez signed a four-fight deal with Riyadh Season, which meant the Crawford fight was back on.

Immediately after defeating William Scull on May 3, Álvarez was joined in the ring by Crawford as the fight was formally announced. On June 7, following UFC 316, a reporter questioned Dana White about the card. White replied that he would be promoting the fight. Alalshikh then posted on X to back what White had said. With TKO back on board, Netflix was likely to broadcast the event. On June 10, the fight was officially announced, along with a three-city press tour scheduled for Riyadh, New York and Las Vegas. The fight was to take place on September 13, streaming live on Netflix. On June 17, Allegiant Stadium was officially confirmed as the host venue. It was reported that a deal was done to reschedule a college football game, which was supposed to take place that day.

In August, the WBA announced that Crawford would forfeit the light middleweight title at the start of the fight, with Abass Baraou being elevated to the position of full WBA champion, thereby maintaining the title's active status in that division. Crawford responded to rumors concerning a shoulder injury during an event in Las Vegas, expressing skepticism about the speculation. He assured reporters that he was not injured and criticized the assertions regarding his fitness and speed. Crawford affirmed that he was at his natural weight and rejected claims that his physique would impact his performance. At the official weigh-ins, both fighters came in at 167.5 pounds, the highest weight of Crawford's career.

Crawford, fighting out of the southpaw stance, started cautiously before taking control in the sixth round with a clean hook that shifted the momentum. He outboxed Álvarez through the middle rounds, mixing sharp jabs and counters, while surviving a cut from a head clash in the ninth. Álvarez rallied briefly in the tenth, but Crawford finished stronger in the championship rounds to earn a unanimous decision and become undisputed super middleweight champion by scores of 116–112, 115–113, and 115–113.

70,482 people attended the event, shattering the previous record for Las Vegas boxing attendance when 29,214 fans attended the 1982 fight between Larry Holmes and Gerry Cooney, and ranking as the second-largest indoor boxing crowd in U.S. history. It was the third largest gate in boxing history, pulling in $47,231,887. The fight was watched by 41,400,000 people, making it the most watched championship boxing match of the 21st century.

On December 3, the WBC stripped Crawford of his world title, claiming he had not paid $300,000 in sanctioning fees.

=== Retirement ===
On December 16, 2025, Crawford announced his retirement from boxing, sharing a career-highlight video on social media accompanied by the message, "Walking away as a great with nothing else left to prove." Weeks later, he opened up further about retiring, citing his age as a major factor. He said, "I'm 38. 38 is old in boxing. I been boxing since I was 7." He believes that, if he continues competing, he will never receive the respect he deserves regardless of whom he defeats.

== Fighter profile ==
=== Boxing style ===
Crawford is considered one of the most complete boxers of his generation. His ability to fluidly switch between orthodox and southpaw stances keeps opponents off balance and creates openings for his offense; with each switch changing not just his lead foot, but the angle of his attack, making it hard for opponents to predict his movements. This dynamic switch-hitting allows him to control the fight's pace, disrupt defensive strategies, and land powerful, unexpected punches, often frustrating his opponents and forcing them to take reckless risks, which he expertly counters. Crawford while being naturally right-handed has power in both hands; from both stances and has trained his left hand to also deliver knockout punching power.

An expert defensive boxer, Crawford combines slips, weaves, shoulder rolls, and agile footwork to evade opponents and set up devastating counters. His head movement is key, often slipping punches and pivoting with precision, much like Pernell Whitaker. Crawford also uses the philly shell defense from a southpaw stance, deflecting punches off his lead shoulder or forearm while maintaining distance. His lowered lead hand allows for a flicker jab, setting up his powerful rear hand, similar to Thomas Hearns.

Crawford's greatest strength is believed to be his ability to adapt mid-fight. Being a slow starter by design, using the early rounds to study timing, tendencies, and weaknesses; once he finds a gap, he shifts gears quickly, often flipping the momentum with a single exchange. Crawford is recognized for his ability to secure stoppage victories, often relying on timing and counterpunching rather than constant aggression. Analysts have noted his ability to adjust strategies during bouts and maintain composure under pressure, which has contributed to his success across multiple weight classes. He recorded 11 consecutive finishes in world title fights, a streak that reinforced his reputation as one of the leading boxers of his era.

=== Training ===
Terence Crawford's training approach is unique in its collaborative and holistic nature. His coaches—Brian McIntyre, Esaú Diéguez, and Jamie Belt—work in sync to develop his skills. Each trainer brings a different perspective, with McIntyre focusing on tactics and strategy, Diéguez offering a deep understanding of boxing technique, and Belt specializing in strength and conditioning.

Crawford's training involves a mix of traditional methods and modern techniques. A key part of his preparation is adaptability—he works on both orthodox and southpaw stances, practicing various scenarios, such as cutting the ring off or adjusting to opponents who jump in or stand still. Sparring is prioritized every other day, but it is balanced with recovery-focused activities like swimming. Swimming serves as a low-impact cardio workout that helps with muscle recovery, lung capacity, and overall endurance.

Belt's focus is on injury prevention and building Crawford's athleticism, transitioning him from traditional, long-distance running to interval-based training and weightlifting. This shift in training methods, including core strengthening and muscle stabilization, enhances Crawford's overall performance. The training plan also emphasizes gradually increasing the intensity of workouts, ensuring that Crawford's cardio is optimal for the late rounds of fights.

As the training camp progresses, the team relocates to Colorado to focus on higher-altitude training, which helps with stamina and conditioning.

When it comes to his diet during training camps, Crawford trusts his coach and nutritionist to take care of the details. His typical meal plan includes baked chicken, fish, brown rice, pasta, and vegetables.

== Personal life ==
Crawford has two sisters, Latisha and Shawntay. He has been in a relationship with Alindra Person since the early 2000s. They first met in their hometown of Omaha, Nebraska, and have six children together. Crawford also has another child with another woman.

Crawford reportedly boasts a large real estate portfolio consisting of over 100 properties in Missouri, Colorado, and Nebraska. As of 2025, he has earned more than $100 million in the ring, brings in at least $2 million annually from brand partnerships, and his real estate holdings are valued at over $20 million.

During fight camps, he moves to his second house in Colorado Springs and trains at Triple Threat Gym.

Just three days after defeating Ricky Burns to capture his first world title, Crawford was honored with the Key to the City of Omaha, Nebraska. The Omaha City Council also declared March 4, 2014, as Terence "Bud" Crawford Day.

In August 2018, Larimore Avenue, where he grew up, was renamed Terence "Bud" Crawford Street. Crawford still resides in Omaha along with his family, where he is a celebrated figure.

In May 2025, the University of Nebraska Omaha invited Crawford to be the keynote speaker at the commencement ceremony for graduating students. After delivering his speech, he was honored with the inaugural Spirit of the Maverick award.

=== Business partnerships ===
In May 2017, Crawford signed a deal with sports equipment brand Everlast. In April 2019, he partnered with premium hemp CBD brand Populum, serving as an advocate for the use of CBD among boxers.

After being sponsored by Prime Hydration for his July fight with Errol Spence Jr., Crawford formalized a partnership deal with the company in November 2023.

In 2024, Crawford signed a 10-year licensing agreement for the boxing video game Undisputed, a deal that includes equity ownership and a share of the franchise.

In 2025, Crawford entered into a partnership with Crown Coins Casino to serve as its brand ambassador. As part of the collaboration, Crown Coins sponsored Crawford and launched themed slot games featuring his likeness.

=== In popular culture ===
Crawford was a featured cover athlete on The Ring magazine's September 2015, January 2019, May 2019, and November 2025 issues.

Crawford was featured in the Creed film franchise, appearing in Creed III in 2023. In October 2025, Undisputed released a "Championship Edition" of its video game featuring Crawford on the cover. In November 2025, Crawford was featured by Haute Living, modeling some expensive Ulysse Nardin watches.

After winning the undisputed welterweight championship in 2023, the city of Omaha held a parade in Crawford's honor, drawing thousands of supporters. The city held a second parade on September 27, 2025, following his victory over Canelo Álvarez to become the undisputed super middleweight champion; the celebration drew roughly 100,000 supporters, and Mayor John Ewing Jr. presented Crawford with another key to the city.

In Google's list of top trending searches for 2025, Crawford ranked as the most-searched athlete of the year.

==== WWE appearances ====
On July 19, 2024, Crawford was ringside for WWE SmackDown in his hometown of Omaha, Nebraska. During the event, he assisted Cody Rhodes by handing him a chair which he used to hit Grayson Waller.

Crawford appeared on Friday Night SmackDown again the following week, this time stepping into the ring to confront Waller and Austin Theory. Waller warned Crawford by saying "Look at me when I'm talking to you. If you take one more step, my boy Austin Theory will knock you out." Ignoring his warning, Crawford knocked Theory to the ground with one punch.

=== Legal issues ===
In September 2008, after shooting dice with a few friends, Crawford was shot on the right side of his head, right below his ear, while sitting in the driver's seat of his 1986 Oldsmobile Cutlass Supreme. Reportedly, the nine-millimeter bullet changed trajectory after initially hitting the rear windshield. Had it not, it would have hit more directly, penetrated deeply, and done enough damage to be fatal. Despite the badly bleeding wound, Crawford was still able to drive himself to the hospital, where he received several stitches and was later discharged. Crawford fought and won his fifth match of the year against Michael Williams less than two months after the incident. When asked if he found out who the shooter was and if he was caught, Crawford responded "The shooter is dead, he got shot in the head".

In 2016, Crawford faced legal issues stemming from an incident involving his 1984 Chevrolet Monte Carlo at an Omaha, Nebraska, auto body shop. After paying about half of a $2,500 repainting fee, he disputed the quality and delay of the work; when the shop refused to release the car without full payment, Crawford returned with three friends and removed the vehicle from a hydraulic lift, causing an estimated $5,000 in damages. The shop owner said he felt threatened and alleged Crawford pushed him while leaving. Crawford voluntarily surrendered to police on April 22 and was charged with four misdemeanors—destruction of property, theft of service, misdemeanor assault, and trespassing. In September, he was convicted of property damage and disorderly conduct and, in December, sentenced to 90 days in jail, two years of probation, and 120 hours of community service. The jail sentence was later overturned on appeal, while the probation and community service terms remained in effect.

In the early hours of his 38th birthday, just before 1:30 a.m. on September 28, 2025, Crawford was held at gunpoint during a traffic stop in Omaha after officers stopped his sedan for reckless driving and observed a firearm on the driver's side floorboard. Police ordered Crawford and three other occupants out of the vehicle with weapons drawn; all were legally permitted to carry firearms, and Crawford was cited for reckless driving. Omaha mayor John Ewing Jr. and Police Chief Todd Schmaderer announced a review of the incident, with Schmaderer authorizing an internal affairs investigation that later found no policy violations. Body-camera footage showed the initial interaction was cordial, with Crawford explaining the new car "got away from him," but an officer who did not hear the disclosure of legal firearms drew his weapon upon seeing the gun, and the occupants were briefly handcuffed before being released. Schmaderer said the video would not be released without Crawford's consent. In April 2026, Crawford was found guilty of careless driving and fined $75 following the traffic stop, along with a further $49 for court fees. The police officers involved were cleared of any wrongdoing.

Just days after announcing his retirement from boxing, Crawford was named in a civil lawsuit filed December 18, 2025, in Manhattan Civil Court by New York jeweler Mazza New York, which is seeking at least $1,500,000 in damages over an alleged failed promotional agreement. The suit claims that during a February 2024 visit, Crawford received a Patek Philippe Aquanaut valued at about $139,000 in exchange for a $35,000 cash payment and promotional placement of the jeweler's logo on his fight trunks. According to the filing, the logo detached early in Crawford's August 2024 bout against Israil Madrimov and, despite assurances it would appear in his next fight, was not displayed during his September bout against Canelo Álvarez. Mazza estimates the lost exposure from the Álvarez fight alone at approximately $1,500,000 and is seeking return of the watch, now valued at more than $155,000, along with damages for breach of contract, unjust enrichment, and conversion.

== Charitable work ==
=== B&B Sports Academy ===
In October 2013, Crawford co-founded B&B Sports Academy, a nonprofit gym dedicated to building the body, mind and character of young people, including at-risk youth in need of positive, structured activities. The academy is free for kids and includes a mandatory tutoring program that requires everyone to maintain at least a C average in school.

=== Other charitable work ===
In 2013, Crawford started an Anti-Bullying campaign where he went to schools all over Omaha to discuss bullying, how to deal with it, and how to prevent it.

In 2014, Crawford traveled with his former teacher Jamie Nollette to Rwanda and Uganda on several charitable missions to help build and drill wells to create clean water for communities.

In September 2023, Crawford participated in a celebrity charity basketball game staged to benefit the Lifedriven Foundation, a non-profit organization committed to supporting adolescents diagnosed with cancer, and their families.

In 2024, he returned to Uganda for charity and other philanthropic reasons.

== Professional boxing record ==
| 42 fights | 42 wins | 0 losses |
|---|---|---|
| By knockout | 31 | 0 |
| By decision | 11 | 0 |

| No. | Result | Record | Opponent | Type | Round, time | Date | Location | Notes |
|---|---|---|---|---|---|---|---|---|
| 42 | Win | 42–0 | Canelo Álvarez | UD | 12 | Sep 13, 2025 | Allegiant Stadium, Paradise, Nevada, U.S. | Won WBA (Super), WBC, IBF, WBO, and The Ring super middleweight titles |
| 41 | Win | 41–0 | Israil Madrimov | UD | 12 | Aug 3, 2024 | BMO Stadium, Los Angeles, California, U.S. | Won WBA and vacant WBO interim light middleweight titles |
| 40 | Win | 40–0 | Errol Spence Jr. | TKO | 9 (12), 2:32 | Jul 29, 2023 | T-Mobile Arena, Paradise, Nevada, U.S. | Retained WBO welterweight title; Won WBA (Super), WBC, IBF, and vacant The Ring welterweight titles |
| 39 | Win | 39–0 | David Avanesyan | KO | 6 (12), 2:14 | Dec 10, 2022 | CHI Health Center, Omaha, Nebraska, U.S. | Retained WBO welterweight title |
| 38 | Win | 38–0 | Shawn Porter | TKO | 10 (12), 1:21 | Nov 20, 2021 | Michelob Ultra Arena, Paradise, Nevada, U.S. | Retained WBO welterweight title |
| 37 | Win | 37–0 | Kell Brook | TKO | 4 (12), 1:14 | Nov 14, 2020 | MGM Grand Conference Center, Paradise, Nevada, U.S. | Retained WBO welterweight title |
| 36 | Win | 36–0 | Egidijus Kavaliauskas | TKO | 9 (12), 0:44 | Dec 14, 2019 | Madison Square Garden, New York City, New York, U.S. | Retained WBO welterweight title |
| 35 | Win | 35–0 | Amir Khan | TKO | 6 (12), 0:47 | Apr 20, 2019 | Madison Square Garden, New York City, New York, U.S. | Retained WBO welterweight title |
| 34 | Win | 34–0 | José Benavidez Jr. | TKO | 12 (12), 2:42 | Oct 13, 2018 | CHI Health Center, Omaha, Nebraska, U.S. | Retained WBO welterweight title |
| 33 | Win | 33–0 | Jeff Horn | TKO | 9 (12), 2:33 | Jun 9, 2018 | MGM Grand Garden Arena, Paradise, Nevada, U.S. | Won WBO welterweight title |
| 32 | Win | 32–0 | Julius Indongo | KO | 3 (12), 1:38 | Aug 19, 2017 | Pinnacle Bank Arena, Lincoln, Nebraska, U.S. | Retained WBC, WBO, and The Ring light welterweight titles; Won WBA (Super) and IBF light welterweight titles |
| 31 | Win | 31–0 | Félix Díaz | RTD | 10 (12), 3:00 | May 20, 2017 | Madison Square Garden, New York City, New York, U.S. | Retained WBC, WBO, and The Ring light welterweight titles |
| 30 | Win | 30–0 | John Molina Jr. | TKO | 8 (12), 2:32 | Dec 10, 2016 | CenturyLink Center, Omaha, Nebraska, U.S. | Retained WBC, WBO, and The Ring light welterweight titles |
| 29 | Win | 29–0 | Viktor Postol | UD | 12 | Jul 23, 2016 | MGM Grand Garden Arena, Paradise, Nevada, U.S. | Retained WBO light welterweight title; Won WBC and vacant The Ring light welterweight titles |
| 28 | Win | 28–0 | Hank Lundy | TKO | 5 (12), 2:09 | Feb 27, 2016 | The Theater at Madison Square Garden, New York City, New York, U.S. | Retained WBO light welterweight title |
| 27 | Win | 27–0 | Dierry Jean | TKO | 10 (12), 2:30 | Oct 24, 2015 | CenturyLink Center, Omaha, Nebraska, U.S. | Retained WBO light welterweight title |
| 26 | Win | 26–0 | Thomas Dulorme | TKO | 6 (12), 1:51 | Apr 18, 2015 | College Park Center, Arlington, Texas, U.S. | Won vacant WBO light welterweight title |
| 25 | Win | 25–0 | Ray Beltrán | UD | 12 | Nov 29, 2014 | CenturyLink Center, Omaha, Nebraska, U.S. | Retained WBO lightweight title; Won vacant The Ring lightweight title |
| 24 | Win | 24–0 | Yuriorkis Gamboa | KO | 9 (12), 2:53 | Jun 28, 2014 | Century Link Center, Omaha, Nebraska, U.S. | Retained WBO lightweight title |
| 23 | Win | 23–0 | Ricky Burns | UD | 12 | Mar 1, 2014 | Exhibition and Conference Centre, Glasgow, Scotland | Won WBO lightweight title |
| 22 | Win | 22–0 | Andrey Klimov | UD | 10 | Oct 5, 2013 | Amway Center, Orlando, Florida, U.S. | Retained NABO lightweight title |
| 21 | Win | 21–0 | Alejandro Sanabria | TKO | 6 (10), 0:17 | Jun 15, 2013 | American Airlines Center, Dallas, Texas, U.S. | Won vacant NABO lightweight title |
| 20 | Win | 20–0 | Breidis Prescott | UD | 10 | Mar 30, 2013 | Mandalay Bay Events Center, Paradise, Nevada, U.S. | |
| 19 | Win | 19–0 | Sidney Siqueira | TKO | 6 (8), 2:47 | Nov 10, 2012 | Wynn Las Vegas, Paradise, Nevada, U.S. | |
| 18 | Win | 18–0 | Hardy Paredes | TKO | 4 (8), 0:40 | Sep 13, 2012 | The Joint, Paradise, Nevada, U.S. | |
| 17 | Win | 17–0 | David Rodela | KO | 2 (6), 2:30 | Jun 8, 2012 | The Joint, Paradise, Nevada, U.S. | |
| 16 | Win | 16–0 | Andre Gorges | KO | 5 (6), 0:44 | Apr 14, 2012 | Mandalay Bay Events Center, Paradise, Nevada, U.S. | |
| 15 | Win | 15–0 | Angel Rios | UD | 8 | Sep 10, 2011 | Boardwalk Hall, Atlantic City, New Jersey, U.S. | |
| 14 | Win | 14–0 | Derrick Campos | TKO | 2 (6), 2:31 | Jul 30, 2011 | Softball Country Arena, Denver, Colorado, U.S. | |
| 13 | Win | 13–0 | Anthony Mora | KO | 1 (6), 1:58 | Feb 26, 2011 | Heartland Events Center, Grand Island, Nebraska, U.S. | |
| 12 | Win | 12–0 | Ron Boyd | TKO | 1 (6), 2:28 | Jul 31, 2010 | Sovereign Bank Stadium, York, Pennsylvania, U.S. | |
| 11 | Win | 11–0 | Marty Robbins | KO | 3 (6), 0:51 | May 1, 2010 | Johnson County Fairgrounds, Iowa City, Iowa, U.S. | |
| 10 | Win | 10–0 | Corey Sommerville | TKO | 2 (4), 1:25 | Dec 19, 2009 | Cotton Eyed Joe, Knoxville, Tennessee, U.S. | |
| 9 | Win | 9–0 | Steve Marquez | TKO | 1 (4), 2:35 | Oct 31, 2009 | Cambria County War Memorial Arena, Johnstown, Pennsylvania, U.S. | |
| 8 | Win | 8–0 | Miguel Delgado | TKO | 3 (4), 1:02 | May 2, 2009 | Cambria County War Memorial Arena, Johnstown, Pennsylvania, U.S. | |
| 7 | Win | 7–0 | Lucas Rodas | KO | 1 (4), 1:52 | Mar 21, 2009 | U.S. Bank Arena, Cincinnati, Ohio, U.S. | |
| 6 | Win | 6–0 | Travis Hartman | UD | 4 | Mar 7, 2009 | Valencia Ballroom, York, Pennsylvania, U.S. | |
| 5 | Win | 5–0 | Michael Williams | TKO | 2 (4), 1:14 | Nov 8, 2008 | Valencia Ballroom, York, Pennsylvania, U.S. | |
| 4 | Win | 4–0 | Aaron Anderson | UD | 4 | Aug 22, 2008 | Johnson County Fairgrounds, Iowa City, Iowa, U.S. | |
| 3 | Win | 3–0 | Damon Antoine | UD | 4 | Jul 26, 2008 | Valencia Ballroom, York, Pennsylvania, U.S. | |
| 2 | Win | 2–0 | Filiberto Nieto | RTD | 1 (4), 3:00 | Apr 3, 2008 | Michael's Eighth Avenue, Glen Burnie, Maryland, U.S. | |
| 1 | Win | 1–0 | Brian Cummings | KO | 1 (4), 0:26 | Mar 14, 2008 | Athletic Club, Denver, Colorado, U.S. | |

== Titles in boxing ==
=== Major world titles ===
- WBO lightweight champion (135 lbs)
- WBA (Super) light welterweight champion (140 lbs)
- WBC light welterweight champion (140 lbs)
- IBF light welterweight champion (140 lbs)
- WBO light welterweight champion (140 lbs)
- WBA (Super) welterweight champion (147 lbs)
- WBC welterweight champion (147 lbs)
- IBF welterweight champion (147 lbs)
- WBO welterweight champion (147 lbs)
- WBA light middleweight champion (154 lbs)
- WBA (Super) super middleweight champion (168 lbs)
- WBC super middleweight champion (168 lbs)
- IBF super middleweight champion (168 lbs)
- WBO super middleweight champion (168 lbs)

=== The Ring magazine titles ===
- The Ring lightweight champion (135 lbs)
- The Ring light welterweight champion (140 lbs)
- The Ring welterweight champion (147 lbs)
- The Ring super middleweight champion (168 lbs)

=== Interim world titles ===
- WBO interim light middleweight champion (154 lbs)

=== Regional/International titles ===
- NABO lightweight champion (135 lbs)

=== Undisputed titles ===
- Undisputed light welterweight champion (Note: First undisputed light welterweight champion of the four-belt era.) (140 lbs)
- Undisputed welterweight champion (Note: First and only undisputed welterweight champion of the four-belt era.) (147 lbs)
- Undisputed super middleweight champion (168 lbs)

=== Honorary titles ===
- WBO Super Champion
- WBC welterweight Champion in Recess
- WBC Nahui Huey Altepemeh champion
- The Ring Special Edition belt champion
- WBC Crown Series Undisputed champion
- WBO Undisputed super middleweight champion

== Awards ==
=== Boxing awards ===
- The Ring magazine Fighter of the Year: 2025
- 2× Sugar Ray Robinson Award: 2014, 2025
- 2× Best Fighter ESPY Award: 2018, 2026
- Best Boxer ESPY Award: 2024
- BBC Sports Personality World Sport Star of the Year Nominee: 2025
- 3× ESPN Fighter of the Year: 2014, 2017, 2025
- 4× ESPN Top 100: (Note: ESPN first introduced the list in 2022.) #2 (2022), #1 (2023), #3 (2024), #1 (2025)
- 2× The Sporting News Men's Fighter of the Year: 2023, 2025
- Sports Illustrated Male Fighter of the Year: 2025
- Sports Illustrated Prospect of the Year: 2013
- BoxingScene Fighter of the Year: 2025
- BoxingScene Event of the Year Canelo Álvarez vs. Terence Crawford: 2025
- BoxingScene American Boxer of the Decade (2020s): 2025
- Fox Sports Greatest Boxer of All Time from Nebraska: 2017
- The Ring magazine Performance of the Year vs. Errol Spence Jr.: 2023
- World Boxing Council Performance of the Year vs. Errol Spence Jr.: 2023
- 5× World Boxing Organization Fighter of the Year: 2016, 2017, 2018, 2023, 2025
- World Boxing Organization Most Promising Fighter: 2015
- 2× World Boxing Organization Fight of the Year: 2014, 2023
- World Boxing Organization Triple Crown Award: 2018
- World Boxing Organization Most Consistent and Durable Champion: 2019
- World Boxing Organization Gordon Volkman Award: 2015
- 4× World Boxing Association Boxer of the Month: August 2017, July 2023, August 2024, September 2025
- 3× Yahoo! Sports Fighter of the Year: 2017, 2023, 2025
- 2× CBS Sports Fighter of the Year: 2014, 2025
- The Nevada Boxing Hall of Fame (NVBHOF) Fighter of the Year: 2018
- The RING 8 Muhammad Ali International Fighter of the Year: 2018
- Bleacher Report Breakout Fighter of the Year: 2014
- Forbes Fighter of the Year: 2017
- Boxing News International Male Fighter of the Year: 2025
- Boxing News World Fighter of the Year: 2023
- International Business Times Fighter of the Year: 2025
- The Independent Fighter of the Year: 2025
- HBO Fighter of the Year: 2014
- HBO Fight of the Year vs. Yuriorkis Gamboa: 2014 (Note: Selected as one of the eight best fights of 2014.)
- Bloody Elbow Boxer of the Year: 2025
- 2× Top Rank Fighter of the Year: 2014, 2015
- Top Rank Fight of the Year vs. Yuriorkis Gamboa: 2014
- Top Rank Knockout of the Year vs. Yuriorkis Gamboa: 2014
- Premier Boxing Champions Performance of the Year vs. Errol Spence Jr.: 2023
- Metro Performance of the Year vs. Errol Spence Jr.: 2023
- Boxing Junkie Fighter of the Year: 2023
- BOXRAW Knockout of the Year vs. David Avanesyan: 2022
- 2× Boxing Insider Fighter of the Year: 2023, 2025
- WBN Knockout of the Year vs. Errol Spence Jr.: 2023
- The Sweet Science (TSS) Fighter of the Year: 2025 (Note: Shared with Naoya Inoue.)
- TSS Performance of the Year vs. Errol Spence Jr.: 2023
- Fight TV Fighter of the Year: 2025
- Frontproof Media Fighter of the Year: 2023
- ProBox TV Fighter of the Year: 2023
- ProBox TV Performance of the Year vs. Errol Spence Jr.: 2023
- The Queensberry Rules Fighter of the Year: 2014
- 2× Pro Boxing Fans Fighter of the Year: 2014, 2025
- Pro Boxing Fans Round of the Year Round 9 vs. Yuriorkis Gamboa: 2014
- Pro Boxing Fans Breakout Performance of the Year vs. Ricky Burns: 2014
- Fight Hype Star in the Making: 2013

=== Awards and honors ===
- Omaha city council declared Tuesday, March 4, 2014, as Terence "Bud" Crawford Day.
- 2× Key to the City of Omaha, Nebraska: 2014, 2025
- The Shadow League Leadership Award: 2015
- Omaha Public Schools (OPS) Athletics Hall of Fame: Class of 2022
- University of Nebraska Omaha Spirit of the Maverick Award: 2025 (inaugural honoree)
- On October 22, 2025, Crawford received one of the highest honors from the Omaha Tribe, a hand-stitched quilt bestowed by the Black Brown and Red Coalition.
- Omaha Sports Hall of Fame: Class of 2026
- Tanzania Tourism Goodwill Ambassador: 2026

== Viewership ==
=== Netflix ===
| No. | Date | Fight | Attendance | Live Gate | Peak Viewers | Ref. |
|---|---|---|---|---|---|---|
| 1 | September 13, 2025 | Álvarez vs. Crawford | 70,482 | $47,231,887 | 41,400,000 | |

=== Pay-per-view bouts ===
United States
| No. | Date | Fight | Billing | PPV Buys | Network | Revenue |
|---|---|---|---|---|---|---|
| 1 | July 23, 2016 | Crawford vs. Postol | Red vs Blue | 60,000 | HBO | $3,600,000 |
| 2 | April 20, 2019 | Crawford vs. Khan | Khan vs. Crawford | 200,000 | ESPN | $14,000,000 |
| 3 | November 20, 2021 | Crawford vs. Porter | Crawford vs. Porter | 190,000 | ESPN+ | $13,298,100 |
| 4 | December 10, 2022 | Crawford vs. Avanesyan | Crawford vs. Avanesyan | 120,000 | BLK Prime | $4,800,000 |
| 5 | July 29, 2023 | Spence Jr. vs. Crawford | Undefeated. Undisputed. Unprecedented. | 700,000 | Showtime | $59,000,000 |
| 6 | August 3, 2024 | Crawford vs. Madrimov | Crawford vs. Madrimov | 200,000 | DAZN/ESPN+ | $16,000,000 |
| | Total | | | 1,470,000 | | $110,698,100 |

=== Non-PPV Headlined Main Events ===
| No. | Date | Fight | Network | Peak Viewers | Ref. |
|---|---|---|---|---|---|
| 1 | March 1, 2014 | Burns vs. Crawford | Sky Sports/AWE | Not Disclosed | |
| 2 | June 28, 2014 | Crawford vs. Gamboa | HBO | 1,286,000 | |
| 3 | November 29, 2014 | Crawford vs. Beltrán | HBO | 936,000 | |
| 4 | April 18, 2015 | Crawford vs. Dulorme | HBO | 1,084,000 | |
| 5 | October 24, 2015 | Crawford vs. Jean | HBO | 1,200,000 | |
| 6 | February 27, 2016 | Crawford vs. Lundy | HBO | 1,031,000 | |
| 7 | December 10, 2016 | Crawford vs. Molina | HBO | 871,000 | |
| 8 | May 20, 2017 | Crawford vs. Díaz | HBO | 1,036,000 | |
| 9 | August 19, 2017 | Crawford vs. Indongo | ESPN | 1,327,000 | |
| 10 | June 9, 2018 | Horn vs. Crawford | ESPN+ | Not Disclosed | |
| 11 | October 13, 2018 | Crawford vs. Benavidez | ESPN | 2,700,000 | |
| 12 | December 14, 2019 | Crawford vs. Kavaliauskas | ESPN | 1,648,000 | |
| 13 | November 14, 2020 | Crawford vs. Brook | ESPN | 2,078,000 | |

== Filmography ==
=== Television and film ===
| Air Date | Title | Role | Notes | Ref |
|---|---|---|---|---|
| July 9, 2016 | Terence Crawford: My Fight | Himself | Documentary film | |
| May 15–21, 2017 | Camp Life: Terence Crawford | Himself | Top Rank - 4 part mini series | |
| June 7, 2018 | Camp Life | Himself | ESPN+ exclusive - 1 episode | |
| October 9, 2018 | A Born Fighter | Himself | ESPN exclusive | |
| October 9–12, 2018 | Camp Life | Himself | ESPN+ - 4 part mini series | |
| December 20, 2018 | Fair Game with Kristine Leahy | Himself | Fox Sports 1 - Exclusive guest | |
| January 18, 2019 | The James Brown Show | Himself | Featured exclusive - 1 episode | |
| April 12, 2019 | Terence Crawford: The Untold Story | Himself | BT Sport exclusive documentary | |
| April 14, 2019 | No Filter Boxing | Himself | BT Sport exclusive interview | |
| April 17, 2019 | BT Sport's: Faceoff | Himself | Co-featured guest | |
| November 17, 2019 | TMZ Sports | Himself | Fox Sports 1 - Special guest | |
| December 6, 2019 | Unguarded: Andre Ward with Terence Crawford | Himself | ESPN+ exclusive - 1 episode | |
| December 11, 2019 | First Take | Himself | Special guest - 1 episode | |
| December 13, 2019 | Max on Boxing | Himself | ESPN2 - Special guest | |
| November 8, 2020 | Terence Crawford: Relentless | Himself | ESPN exclusive | |
| November 11, 2020 | SportsCenter | Himself | Special guest | |
| November 9–15, 2021 | Blood, Sweat and Tears: Crawford vs Porter | Himself | Top Rank Boxing on ESPN - Co-featured 2 part exclusive | |
| November 18, 2021 | This Just In | Himself | ESPN special guest - 1 episode | |
| March 3, 2023 | Creed III | Lorenzo 'Nightmare' Jones | Cameo | |
| May 26, 2023 | First Take | Himself | Special guest - 1 episode | |
| July 8 – August 5, 2023 | All Access | Himself | Showtime - 3 part series | |
| August 9, 2023 | CBS Mornings | Himself | Special guest - 1 episode | |
| July 12, 2024 | Riyadh Season: Crawford vs Madrimov "Everything or Nothing" | Himself | Promotional short film | |
| July 19 & July 26, 2024 | WWE SmackDown! | Himself | Special guest - 2 episodes | |
| July 28–29, 2024 | Crawford vs Madrimov: 40 Days | Himself | DAZN - Co-featured 2 part exclusive | |
| August 1, 2024 | Off the Cuff with Terence Crawford | Himself | DAZN - Exclusive guest | |
| August 3, 2024 | SportsCenter | Himself | Special guest | |
| September 17, 2024 | TMZ Sports | Himself | Fox Sports 1 - Special guest | |

=== Podcasts and radio shows ===
| Air Date | Title | Notes | Ref |
|---|---|---|---|
| June 13, 2016 | Sway in the Morning | Exclusive guest | |
| May 22, 2017 | Sway in the Morning | Exclusive guest | |
| March 27, 2019 | Outside The Cage | Exclusive guest | |
| August 19, 2019 | The Joe Rogan Experience MMA Show #76 | Exclusive guest | |
| June 14, 2020 | Last Stand Podcast with Brian Custer | Exclusive guest | |
| November 3, 2020 | The Jim Rome Show | Special guest | |
| November 9, 2020 | Last Stand Podcast with Brian Custer | Exclusive guest | |
| October 25, 2021 | Last Stand Podcast with Brian Custer | Exclusive guest | |
| April 25, 2022 | Framework Podcast | Exclusive guest | |
| May 17, 2022 | The PorterWay Podcast #86 | Special guest | |
| July 18, 2022 | In Da Mix | Exclusive guest | |
| September 15, 2022 | Top Billin' with Bill Bellamy | Exclusive guest | |
| November 28, 2022 | Last Stand Podcast with Brian Custer | Exclusive guest | |
| May 28, 2023 | Million Dollaz Worth of Game #221 | Exclusive guest | |
| June 15, 2023 | The Breakfast Club | Exclusive guest | |
| June 16, 2023 | Sway in the Morning | Exclusive guest | |
| July 25, 2023 | The Pivot Podcast | Exclusive guest | |
| July 25, 2023 | GQ Sports: My First Million | Video series - Exclusive guest | |
| July 26, 2023 | The Jim Rome Show | Special guest | |
| July 28, 2023 | Hotboxin' with Mike Tyson | Exclusive guest | |
| August 3, 2023 | HOT 97 | Exclusive guest | |
| August 8, 2023 | The PorterWay Podcast #148 | Exclusive guest | |
| August 10, 2023 | The Breakfast Club | Exclusive guest | |
| August 15, 2023 | Earn Your Leisure | Exclusive guest | |
| August 16, 2023 | Out Of Office with Rich Kleiman | Exclusive guest | |
| August 18, 2023 | The Joe Rogan Experience MMA Show #145 | Exclusive guest | |
| September 20, 2023 | Weighing In with Travis Hartman | Exclusive guest | |
| November 17, 2023 | Young Money Radio | Co-featured guest | |
| February 14, 2024 | Million Dollaz Worth of Game | Co-featured guest | |
| July 22, 2024 | The MMA Hour with Ariel Helwani | Exclusive guest | |
| July 25, 2024 | All The Smoke Fight | Exclusive guest | |
| July 26, 2024 | GQ Sports: 10 Essentials | Video series - Exclusive guest | |
| July 30, 2024 | Impaulsive #423 | Exclusive guest | |
| August 7, 2024 | The Jim Rome Show | Special guest | |
| August 7, 2024 | The PorterWay Podcast #198 | Special guest | |
| February 17, 2025 | Cigar Talk | Exclusive guest | |
| September 4, 2025 | Full Send Podcast | Exclusive guest | |
| September 30, 2025 | All The Smoke Fight | Exclusive guest | |

Video games
| Year | Title | Role | Notes | Ref. |
|---|---|---|---|---|
| 2024 | Undisputed | Himself | "Championship Edition" cover athlete | |
| 2025 | Fight Night Champion | Himself | Fight Night Forever mod playable character | |

== See also ==
- List of male boxers
- List of world lightweight boxing champions
- List of world light-welterweight boxing champions
- List of world welterweight boxing champions
- List of world light-middleweight boxing champions
- List of world super-middleweight boxing champions
- List of boxing quintuple champions
- List of undefeated world boxing champions

== Notes ==
Sporting positions
Regional boxing titles
| Vacant Title last held by John Molina Jr. | NABO lightweight champion June 15, 2013 – March 1, 2014 | Vacant Title next held by Ray Beltrán |
World boxing titles
| Preceded by Ricky Burns | WBO lightweight champion March 1, 2014 – March 5, 2015; Vacated | Vacant Title next held by Terry Flanagan |
| Vacant Title last held by Juan Manuel Márquez | The Ring lightweight champion November 29, 2014 – April 22, 2015; Vacated | Vacant Title next held by Jorge Linares |
| Vacant Title last held by Chris Algieri | WBO light welterweight champion April 18, 2015 – October 26, 2017; Vacated | Vacant Title next held by Maurice Hooker |
| Preceded by Viktor Postol | WBC light welterweight champion July 23, 2016 – February 13, 2018; Vacated | Vacant Title next held by José Ramírez |
| Vacant Title last held by Danny Garcia | The Ring light welterweight champion July 23, 2016 – February 18, 2018; Vacated | Vacant Title next held by Josh Taylor |
| Vacant Title last held by Adrien Broner | WBA light welterweight champion Super title August 19 – October 28, 2017; Vacated | Vacant Title next held by Regis Prograis |
| Preceded by Julius Indongo | IBF light welterweight champion August 19 – 30, 2017; Vacated | Vacant Title next held by Sergey Lipinets |
| Vacant Title last held by Kostya Tszyu | Undisputed light welterweight champion August 19 – 30, 2017; Titles fragmented | Vacant Title next held by Josh Taylor |
| Preceded by Jeff Horn | WBO welterweight champion June 9, 2018 – August 12, 2024; Vacated | Succeeded by Brian Norman Jr. Interim champion promoted |
| Preceded by Errol Spence Jr. | WBA welterweight champion Super title July 29, 2023 – August 30, 2024; Vacated | Vacant Title next held by Jaron Ennis |
| Preceded by Errol Spence Jr. | WBC welterweight champion July 29, 2023 – May 27, 2024; Status changed | Succeeded by Mario Barrios; Interim champion promoted |
| Preceded by Errol Spence Jr. | IBF welterweight champion July 29 – November 9, 2023; Stripped | Succeeded by Jaron Ennis; Interim champion promoted |
| Vacant Title last held by Floyd Mayweather Jr. | The Ring welterweight champion July 29, 2023 – August 3, 2024; Vacated | Vacant Title next held by Jaron Ennis |
| Vacant Title last held by Zab Judah | Undisputed welterweight champion July 29 – November 9, 2023; Titles fragmented | Vacant |
| Preceded by Israil Madrimov | WBA light middleweight champion August 3, 2024 – September 13, 2025; Stripped | Succeeded by Abass Baraou; Interim champion promoted |
| Vacant Title last held by Tim Tszyu | WBO light middleweight champion Interim title August 3, 2024 – March 21, 2025; Vacated | Vacant |
| Preceded by Canelo Álvarez | WBA super middleweight champion Super title September 13, 2025 – January 1, 2026; Vacated | Vacant |
| Preceded by Canelo Álvarez | WBC super middleweight champion September 13 – December 3, 2025; Stripped | Vacant Title next held by Christian M'billi; Interim champion promoted |
| Preceded by Canelo Álvarez | IBF super middleweight champion September 13, 2025 – December 23, 2025; Vacated | Vacant Title next held by Osleys Iglesias |
| Preceded by Canelo Álvarez | WBO super middleweight champion September 13, 2025 – December 21, 2025; Vacated | Vacant Title next held by Hamzah Sheeraz |
| Preceded by Canelo Álvarez | The Ring super middleweight champion September 13, 2025 – January 27, 2026; Vacated | Vacant |
| Preceded by Canelo Álvarez | Undisputed super middleweight champion September 13 – December 3, 2025; Titles fragmented | Vacant |
Honorary boxing titles
| New title | WBC welterweight champion In recess May 27, 2024 – August 2025 | Vacant |
Awards
| Preceded by Floyd Mayweather Jr. | Sugar Ray Robinson Award; 2014 | Succeeded by Floyd Mayweather Jr. |
| Preceded by Floyd Mayweather Jr. | ESPN Fighter of the Year; 2014 | Succeeded by Canelo Álvarez |
| Preceded by Carl Frampton | ESPN Fighter of the Year; 2017 | Next: Oleksandr Usyk |
| Preceded by Demetrious Johnson | Best Fighter ESPY Award; 2018 | Vacant Title next held by Himself |
| Preceded by Claressa Shields | Best Boxer ESPY Award; 2024 | Succeeded by Katie Taylor |
| Preceded by Oleksandr Usyk | Sugar Ray Robinson Award; 2025 | Incumbent |
| Preceded by Oleksandr Usyk | The Ring magazine Fighter of the Year; 2025 | Incumbent |
| Preceded by Oleksandr Usyk | ESPN Fighter of the Year; 2025 | Incumbent |
| Preceded by Himself | Best Fighter ESPY Award; 2026 | Incumbent |
Achievements
| Inaugural rankings | BWAA pound for pound No. 1 boxer October 3, 2017 – May 1, 2018 | Succeeded by Vasiliy Lomachenko |
| Preceded by Canelo Álvarez | BWAA pound for pound No. 1 boxer June 26, 2022 | Rankings discontinued |
| Preceded by Oleksandr Usyk | The Ring pound for pound No. 1 boxer July 29, 2023 – May 6, 2024 | Succeeded by Naoya Inoue |
| Preceded by Oleksandr Usyk | The Ring pound for pound No. 1 boxer September 15, 2025 – December 24, 2025 | Succeeded by Oleksandr Usyk |
Records
| Shared with Henry Armstrong (featherweight, lightweight, and welterweight); On August 17, 1938 | Undisputed champion in most divisions 3 (light welterweight, welterweight, and super middleweight); Equaled on September 13, 2025 | Incumbent |
| Preceded by Naoya Inoue; Oleksandr Usyk; 2 | Undisputed champion in most divisions in four-belt era 3 (light welterweight, welterweight, and super middleweight); September 13, 2025 – present | Incumbent |
| Preceded by Henry Armstrong, Sugar Ray Leonard, Manny Pacquiao, Floyd Mayweather Jr., and Canelo Álvarez; 3 | Ring magazine champion in most divisions 4 (lightweight, light welterweight, welterweight, and super middleweight); September 13, 2025 – present | Incumbent |
| Shared with Manny Pacquiao and Floyd Mayweather Jr. | Lineal champion in most divisions 4 (lightweight, light welterweight, welterweight, and super middleweight); Equaled on September 13, 2025 | Incumbent |
