= Alejandro Sanabria =

Mexican boxer (born 1987)

Personal information
- Nickname: Flacucho/Flaquita
- Born: Alejandro Sanabria Jr. 19 February 1987 (age 39) Mexico City, Mexico
- Height: 5 ft 9 1/2 in (177 cm)
- Weight: Super featherweight Lightweight

Boxing career
- Stance: Orthodox

Boxing record
- Total fights: 37
- Wins: 34
- Win by KO: 25
- Losses: 2
- Draws: 1

Alejandro Sanabria Jr. (born 19 February 1987) was a Mexican professional boxer who competed from 2004 to 2013. He is a former WBC Continental Americas super featherweight and WBC Silver lightweight champion.

== Professional career ==
Sanabria began his professional career in 2004. He mainly campaigned in the super featherweight and lightweight divisions.

A rising prospect, Sanabria claimed the WBC FECARBOX super featherweight title in 2008 and added the NABF super featherweight title the following year. In 2011, he earned a notable victory over Olympic silver medalist Rocky Juarez to capture the vacant WBC Continental Americas super featherweight title, and later that year secured the vacant WBC Silver lightweight title. His final professional appearance came on 15 June 2013, when he challenged future five-division world champion and three-division undisputed champion Terence Crawford for the vacant NABO lightweight title, losing by sixth-round technical knockout.

== Professional boxing record ==
37 fights	34 wins	2 losses
By knockout	25	1
By decision	9	1
Draws	1	

No.	Result	Record	Opponent	Type	Round, time	Date	Location	Notes
37	Loss	34–2–1	Terence Crawford	TKO	6 (10), 0:17	15 Jun 2013	American Airlines Center, Dallas, U.S.	For vacant NABO lightweight title
36	Win	34–1–1	Nery Saguilán	SD	10	24 Nov 2012	Gimnasio Municipal "José Neri Santos", Ciudad Juárez, Mexico	
35	Win	33–1–1	Seiichi Okada	TKO	8 (10)	18 Aug 2012	Gimnasio Miguel Hidalgo, Puebla, Mexico	
34	Win	32–1–1	Balweg Bangoyan	UD	10	31 Mar 2012	Gimnasio Auditorio, Los Cabos, Mexico	Retained WBC Silver lightweight title
33	Win	31–1–1	Jhunriel Ramonal	KO	4 (12), 2:05	28 Jan 2012	Gimnasio Manuel Bernardo Aguirre, Chihuahua, Mexico	Retained WBC Silver lightweight title
32	Win	30–1–1	Vinvin Rufino	KO	5 (12)	3 Dec 2011	Centro Banamex, Mexico City, Mexico	Won vacant WBC Silver lightweight title
31	Win	29–1–1	Pedro Navarrete	UD	10	1 Oct 2011	Centro de Expositores, Puebla, Mexico	
30	Win	28–1–1	Alejandro Barrera	TKO	4 (10)	3 Sep 2011	Centro de Convenciones, San Luis Potosí, Mexico	
29	Win	27–1–1	Rocky Juarez	UD	12	19 Feb 2011	Auditorio Ernesto Rufo, Rosarito, Mexico	Won vacant WBC Continental Americas super featherweight title
28	Win	26–1–1	Sergio López	TKO	2 (10)	18 Dec 2010	Caliente Racetrack, Tijuana, Mexico	
27	Win	25–1–1	Arturo Valenzuela	TKO	6 (?)	27 Nov 2010	Auditorio Ernesto Rufo, Rosarito, Mexico	
26	Loss	24–1–1	Robinson Castellanos	UD	10	19 Jun 2010	Gimnasio de Mexicali, Mexicali, Mexico	
25	Win	24–0–1	Adrián Olvera	KO	2 (8)	27 Mar 2010	Arena Monterrey, Monterrey, Mexico	
24	Draw	23–0–1	Abraham Rodríguez	SD	12	12 Dec 2009	Gimnasio INDEJ, Tepic, Mexico	
23	Win	23–0–0	Gerardo Zayas	TKO	1 (12)	10 Oct 2009	Arena Municipal, Querétaro, Mexico	Retained NABF super featherweight title
22	Win	22–0–0	Manuel Arellano	KO	5 (12)	21 Aug 2009	Gimnasio Germán Evers, Mazatlán, Mexico	Won vacant NABF super featherweight title
21	Win	21–0–0	Wilfredo Acuña	UD	10	28 Mar 2009	Deportivo Pino Suárez, Mexico City, Mexico	
20	Win	20–0–0	Guadalupe Arce	TKO	2 (10)	28 Feb 2009	Gimnasio Germán Evers, Mazatlán, Mexico	
19	Win	19–0–0	Jorge Romero	KO	3 (8)	13 Dec 2008	Gimnasio Medardo Meza Domínguez, Loreto, Mexico	
18	Win	18–0–0	Genaro Camargo	KO	3 (10)	22 Nov 2008	Avenida Revolución, Tijuana, Mexico	
17	Win	17–0–0	Daniel Agüillón	KO	12 (12)	15 Oct 2008	Foro Scotiabank, Polanco, Mexico	Retained WBC FECARBOX super featherweight title
16	Win	16–0–0	Abraham Rodríguez	TKO	8 (12)	31 Jul 2008	Roots Magic Club, Lomas de Sotelo, Mexico	Won WBC FECARBOX super featherweight title
15	Win	15–0–0	Ramón Méndez	TKO	7 (8)	28 May 2008	Foro Scotiabank, Polanco, Mexico	
14	Win	14–0–0	Miguel Camacho	KO	1 (8)	30 Apr 2008	Foro Scotiabank, Polanco, Mexico	
13	Win	13–0–0	Margarito López	KO	3 (10)	12 Mar 2008	Foro Scotiabank, Polanco, Mexico	
12	Win	12–0–0	Francisco Valdez	KO	7 (?)	20 Dec 2007	Discoteca Stratus, Ciudad Nezahualcóyotl, Mexico	
11	Win	11–0–0	Arturo Herrera	KO	1 (6)	18 Aug 2007	Arena Neza, Ciudad Nezahualcóyotl, Mexico	
10	Win	10–0–0	Argel Salinas	TKO	5 (6)	3 May 2007	Salón 21, Mexico City, Mexico	
9	Win	9–0–0	Gilbert Aguilar	KO	5 (6)	29 Mar 2007	Salón 21, Mexico City, Mexico	
8	Win	8–0–0	Alejandro Salazar	UD	4	6 Jul 2006	Salón 21, Mexico City, Mexico	
7	Win	7–0–0	José Luis León	KO	2 (4)	18 May 2006	Salón 21, Mexico City, Mexico	
6	Win	6–0–0	Jorge Castillo	TKO	1 (4)	20 Apr 2006	Salón 21, Mexico City, Mexico	
5	Win	5–0–0	Diego Armando Santana	UD	4	16 Mar 2006	Salón 21, Mexico City, Mexico	
4	Win	4–0–0	Emmanuel Sánchez	UD	4	27 Aug 2005	Salón Fascinación, Mexico City, Mexico	
3	Win	3–0–0	Emanuel Machorro	TKO	1 (4)	17 Mar 2005	Salón 21, Mexico City, Mexico	
2	Win	2–0–0	Omar Benítez	UD	6	15 Dec 2004	Salón Fascinación, Mexico City, Mexico	
1	Win	1–0–0	Uriel Ramírez	TKO	4 (4)	23 Oct 2004	Centro El Tapatío, Ecatepec, Mexico City, Mexico	
