= Brian O'Shea =

Brian O'Shea may refer to:

- Brian O'Shea (politician) (1944–2026), Irish Labour Party politician
- Brian O'Shea (boxer), former American boxer, referee, and judge
