= List of U.S. national Golden Gloves lightweight champions =

This is a list of United States national Golden Gloves champions in the lightweight division, along with the state or region they represented. The weight limit for lightweights was first contested at 135 lb (61 kg), but was lowered to 132 lb (60 kg) in 1967.

- 1928 - Joe Kestian - Chicago, Illinois
- 1929 - Roosevelt Haines - Chicago, Illinois
- 1930 - Chancy Crain - Chicago, Illinois
- 1931 - Scotty Sylvano - Chicago, Illinois
- 1932 - Henry Rothier - Davenport, Iowa
- 1933 - Edward Ward - Chicago, Illinois
- 1934 - Frank Bojack - Cleveland, Ohio
- 1935 - Mike Gamiere - Cleveland, Ohio
- 1936 - Pete Lello - Michigan City, Indiana
- 1937 - Edward Kozole - Detroit, Michigan
- 1938 - John Benna - Terre Haute, Indiana
- 1939 - John Pleasant - Chicago, Illinois
- 1940 - Tony Ancona - Detroit, Michigan
- 1941 - Johnny Green - Buffalo, New York
- 1942 - Morris Garana - Fort Worth, Texas
- 1943 - Chuck Hunter - Cleveland, Ohio
- 1944 - Buddy Holderfield - Memphis, Tennessee
- 1945 - Bernard Paige - Chicago, Illinois
- 1946 - Herschel Acton - Oklahoma City, Oklahoma
- 1947 - John Labrol - Gary
- 1948 - Herschel Acton - Oklahoma City, Oklahoma
- 1949 - Gale Outhouse - Sioux City, Iowa
- 1950 - James Burroughs - Nashville, Tennessee
- 1951 - Bobby Bickle - Kansas City, Missouri
- 1952 - Issac Vaughn - Cleveland, Ohio
- 1953 - Herb Mickles - Toledo, Ohio
- 1954 - Phil Horsley - Muncie, Indiana
- 1955 - William Morton - Kansas City, Missouri
- 1956 - Joe Shaw - St. Louis, Missouri
- 1957 - Billy Braggs - Kenosha, Wisconsin
- 1958 - Billy Collins - Nashville
- 1959 - Freddie Davis - Champaign/Urbana
- 1960 - Brian O'Shea - Chicago, Illinois
- 1961 - Thomas O'Shea - Chicago, Illinois
- 1962 - Edward Ellis - Toledo
- 1963 - Perry Bennett - Streator, Illinois
- 1964 - Hedgeman Louis - Detroit, Michigan
- 1965 - Frank Anderson - Kansas City, Missouri
- 1966 - Marcus Anderson - Louisville, Kentucky
- 1967 - Quincelon Daniels - Detroit, Michigan
- 1968 - Ronnie Harris - Cleveland, Ohio
- 1969 - Eddie Murray - Chicago, Illinois
- 1970 - Norman Goins - Indianapolis, Indiana
- 1971 - James Busceme - Fort Worth, Texas
- 1972 - James Busceme - Fort Worth, Texas
- 1973 - Sugar Ray Leonard - Washington, D.C.
- 1974 - Curtis Harris - Elizabeth, New Jersey
- 1975 - Aaron Pryor - Cincinnati, Ohio
- 1976 - Aaron Pryor - Indianapolis, Indiana
- 1977 - Hugo Rodriguez - Miami, Florida
- 1978 - Davey Armstrong - Puyallup, Washington
- 1979 - Johnny Bumphus - Knoxville, Tennessee
- 1980 - Melvin Paul - Lafayette, Louisiana
- 1981 - Primo Ramos - Chicago, Illinois
- 1982 - Robert Byrd - Fort Worth, Texas
- 1983 - Jesse Lopez, Jr. - Las Vegas
- 1984 - Marvin Chambers - St. Louis, Missouri
- 1985 - Vince Phillips - Hutchinson, Kansas
- 1986 - Lavell Finger - St. Louis, Missouri
- 1987 - Skipper Kelp - Rocky Mountain
- 1988 - Kevin Childrey - Grand Rapids
- 1989 - Tonga McLain - Milwaukee
- 1990- Lamar Murphy - Florida
- 1991 - Desi Ford - Cleveland, Ohio
- 1992 - Danny Rios - Texas
- 1993 - Danny Rios - Mid-South
- 1994 - Salvador Jasso - So. California
- 1995 - Dante Craig - Cincinnati, Ohio
- 1996 - David Jackson - Nevada
- 1997 - Kenito Drake - Detroit
- 1998 - Lamont Pearson - Washington, D.C.
- 1999 - Matthew Smith- New Hampshire
- 2000 - Urbano Antillón - California
- 2001 - [Matthew Smith] - New Hampshire
- 2002 - Lorenzo Reynolds - Michigan
- 2003 - Anthony Peterson - Washington, D.C.
- 2004 - Danny Williams - St. Louis, Missouri
- 2005 - Michael Evans - Cincinnati, Ohio
- 2006 - Jesus Mendez III - Texas
- 2007 - Sadam Ali - Brooklyn
- 2008 - Michael Perez - Newark, New Jersey
- 2009 - Erick Deleon - Detroit, Michigan
- 2010 - Erick Deleon - Detroit, Michigan
- 2011 - Erick Deleon - Detroit, Michigan
- 2012 - Albert Bell - Toledo, Ohio
- 2013 - Lamont Roach Jr. - Washington D.C.
- 2014 - Maliek Montgomery - Macon, Georgia
- 2015 - Teófimo López - Brooklyn
- 2016 - Maliek Montgomery - Macon, Georgia
- 2017 - Keyshawn Davis - Alexandria, Virginia
- 2018 - Doctress Robinson - Augusta, Georgia
