= 2007 U.S. Pan American Box-Offs =

The 2007 U.S. Pan American Box-Offs were held in Colorado Springs, Colorado. The semi-finals and finals took place between January 20–21, 2007. The winners of these games will be part of the U.S. team in the Pan American Games, July 16–29 in Rio de Janeiro, Brazil. However, each still must qualify internationally before competing in the Pan Am Games.

== Gold medalists ==
- Luis Yáñez (106 lbs)
- Shawn Nichol (112 lbs)
- Roberto Marroquin (119 lbs)
- Rico Ramos (125 lbs)
- Terence Crawford (132 lbs)
- Karl Dargan (141 lbs)
- Demetrius Andrade (152 lbs)
- Shawn Porter (165 lbs)
- Christopher Downs (178 lbs)
- Adam Willett (201 lbs)
- Mike Wilson (201+ lbs)

== See also ==
- Boxing at the 2007 Pan American Games
- Boxing at the 2007 Pan American Games - Qualifier
