= Undisputed (video game) =

Boxing video game

- Standard edition cover art featuring Canelo Álvarez
- Developer: Steel City Interactive
- Publisher: Deep Silver
- Director: Asad Habib
- Producer: Ehson Khaliq
- Designers: Julian Carlson; Adam Sas-Skowronski
- Programmer: Asif Habib
- Artist: Andrew Turner
- Engine: Unity
- Platforms: PlayStation 5; Xbox Series X/S; PC
- Release: WW: October 11, 2024
- Genre: Sports
- Modes: Single-player, multiplayer

Undisputed is a boxing video game developed by Steel City Interactive and published by Deep Silver. The game was released on October 11, 2024, for PlayStation 5, Xbox Series X/S and PC.

Undisputed was announced in April 2020 as eSports Boxing Club before it was renamed in September 2022. Undisputed was released via Steam early access in January 2023 and is the first licensed boxing video game since 2011's Fight Night Champion. Support for the game has ceased as Steel City Interactive is developing a sequel.

== Gameplay ==
Undisputed is a fighting game based on the sport of boxing. The game features over 70 licensed fighters, over 60 individual punches as well as 50 different attributes and traits. The game also features a female roster, as well as licensed trainers, cutmen and managers. The game features various mechanics such as "loose" and "flat footed" movement, which affect the speed at which a fighter can move around the ring.

The game features 3 major boxing organizations (World Boxing Council (WBC), World Boxing Organization (WBO), and International Boxing Federation (IBF)) and the fictional Steel City Interactive (SCI) Championship, with their versions of championships being available to win in the game's career mode, which allows players to become the undisputed champion of the world.

== Development ==
Developer Steel City Interactive is based in Sheffield, England. A trailer showcasing the game's movement was released in November 2020, while a character creation preview was released in January 2021. An extended gameplay showcase was released in March 2021 while Canelo Alvarez, the cover star for the standard edition of the game, was revealed in May 2021.

In September 2022, it was announced that the game had been renamed to Undisputed, after which the game was released into Steam early access on January 31, 2023. In November 2023, it was announced that Steel City Interactive had agreed a partnership with Riyadh Season, before a release date announcement trailer was revealed during the Tyson Fury vs. Oleksandr Usyk event. The trailer featured Fury and Usyk along with cover star Canelo Álvarez and Terence Crawford.

== Release ==
Undisputed was released on October 11, 2024, for PlayStation 5, Xbox Series X/S and PC. The standard edition of the game included a 1993 variation of Roy Jones Jr. as a pre-order bonus, while a World Boxing Council themed deluxe edition (featuring former WBC heavyweight champion Tyson Fury on the cover) included a fighter pack featuring Jaime Munguia, Regis Prograis, Jesse Rodriguez, Dmitry Bivol, Caleb Plant and Julio César Chávez, an "Era" pack consisting of young versions of Fury from 2009 (from his first fight with John McDermott), Canelo Álvarez from 2011 (from his fight with Matthew Hatton) and Muhammad Ali from 1964 (from his first fight with Sonny Liston) along with 3 days early access.On 10 September 2025, The "Championship Edition" of Undisputed was announced, featuring Terence Crawford as the cover star. The edition includes the WBC, Iron and Steel, Mexican Monster and Senator packs and released on 28 October 2025.

On October 3, 2024, it was announced that Ryan Garcia, a fighter who had been available throughout early access, would be removed from the game at full release, due to Garcia's various controversies, legal troubles and one year suspension following a failed drug test in his April 2024 fight with Devin Haney. Garcia was added back to the game on April 24, 2025, following the end of his suspension.

The first downloadable content available for the game post-release, “The Problem Child” pack was released on 12 December 2024. The pack features Jake Paul, Zhilei Zhang, Juan Manuel Márquez, Marco Antonio Barrera, Buster Douglas, Otto Wallin and Erik Morales as playable fighters.

The second downloadable content, "The Iron and Steel" pack was released on 2 April 2025. The pack features Wladimir Klitschko, Vitali Klitschko, Jai Opetaia, Román González, Juan Francisco Estrada, Shannon Briggs and Eric Esch as playable fighters.

The third downloadable content, “The Mexican Monster” pack was released on 26 June 2025. The pack features David Benavidez, Andy Ruiz Jr., Charles Martin, Robert Helenius, Fernando Vargas, Héctor Camacho and Sugar Ray Leonard from 1987 (from his fight with Marvin Hagler) as playable fighters.

The fourth downloadable content, "The Takeover" pack was released on 26 August 2025. The pack features Teofimo Lopez, Emanuel Augustus, Janibek Alimkhanuly, Sebastian Fundora, Tim Tszyu and Diego Corrales as playable fighters.

The fifth downloadable content, "The Senator" pack was released on 28 October 2025. The pack features Manny Pacquiao, Edgar Berlanga, Sergey Kovalev, Vinny Paz, Egidijus Kavaliauskas, Evgeny Gradovich and Ricardo Mayorga as playable fighters

== Reception ==
Reception

Aggregate scores
Aggregator	Score
Metacritic	(PS5) 72/100
OpenCritic	37% recommend

Review scores
Publication	Score
IGN	6/10
Shacknews	7/10

Undisputed received "mixed or average" reviews from critics, according to review aggregator Metacritic, and 39% of critics recommended the game, according to OpenCritic. The game currently has an average rating of 2.6 out of 5 on Steam, Xbox and PlayStation.

Undisputed sold over one million copies soon after release, exceeding expectations. It was the first major boxing game since Fight Night Champion in 2011. Its authenticity and extensive roster of real-world fighters were praised.

The realism of the game and it's RPG-approach to fight preparation have been praised, while some have pointed out the gameplay animations and fight commentary aren't up to the bar set by the Fight Night series. Particularly, the poor punch tracking and hit detection, alongside poor online experience.

Steel City Interactive noted these issues in a blog post shortly after the game officially released, stating they would release an update mid-December. This frustrated the player base, who had to wait two months for any of these issues to be addressed in-game.

Steel City Interactive has come under criticism for releasing several paid DLC packs without addressing these issues in-depth to date, resulting in a considerable reduction in their player base. There is also some criticism that many current and relevant fighters are behind a DLC paywall, rather than being included in the base game.
