= Sugar Ray Robinson Award =

American boxing award

- Sport: Boxing
- Awarded for: "Fighter of the Year"
- Country: U.S.
- Presented by: Boxing Writers Association of America

History
- First award: 1938

The Sugar Ray Robinson Award, known alternatively as the Boxing Writers Association of America Fighter of the Year Award and previously known as the Edward J. Neil Trophy, has been conferred annually since 1938 by the Boxing Writers Association of America.

== History ==
The Boxing Writers Association of America (BWAA) first presented the trophy in 1938. The original purpose of the trophy was to recognize "an individual who did the most for boxing in the previous year."

The ** mark indicates the boxer was not active in the year he actually won the award. Over time, the award went strictly to the best fighter of each year as decided by the BWAA. The members of the BWAA vote to decide the best boxer each year regardless of weight class or nationality.

The award was previously named for Edward J. Neil, an Associated Press sportswriter and war correspondent who was killed in 1938 while reporting on the Spanish Civil War. The 2009 award was renamed after boxing great Sugar Ray Robinson. The "Fighter of the Year" award is presented with other honors given by the BWAA at an annual awards dinner.

Starting with the 1990s, the BWAA also began to give an award for "Joe Louis Fighter of the Decade." The winners of this award are listed in a separate section.

== Past recipients ==
=== 1930s ===
- 1938 – (United States) Jack Dempsey**
- 1939 – (United States) Billy Conn

=== 1940s ===
- 1940 – (United States) Henry Armstrong
- 1941 – (United States) Joe Louis
- 1942 – (United States) Barney Ross**
- 1943 – (United States) Boxers of the Armed Forces
- 1944 – (United States) Benny Leonard**
- 1945 – (United States) James J. Walker**
- 1946 – (United States) Tony Zale
- 1947 – (United States) Gus Lesnevich
- 1948 – (United States) Ike Williams
- 1949 – (United States) Ezzard Charles

=== 1950s ===
- 1950 – (United States) Sugar Ray Robinson
- 1951 – (United States) Jersey Joe Walcott
- 1952 – (United States) Rocky Marciano
- 1953 – (Cuba) Kid Gavilán
- 1954 – (United States) Bobo Olson
- 1955 – (United States) Carmen Basilio
- 1956 – (United States) Floyd Patterson
- 1957 – (United States) Carmen Basilio (2)
- 1958 – (United States) Archie Moore
- 1959 – (Sweden) Ingemar Johansson

=== 1960s ===
- 1960 – (United States) Floyd Patterson (2)
- 1961 – (United States) Gene Fullmer
- 1962 – (Nigeria) Dick Tiger
- 1963 – (United States Virgin Islands) Emile Griffith
- 1964 – (United States) Willie Pastrano
- 1965 – (United States) Muhammad Ali
- 1966 – (Nigeria) Dick Tiger (2)
- 1967 – (Puerto Rico) Carlos Ortiz
- 1968 – (United States) Bob Foster
- 1969 – (United States) Joe Frazier

=== 1970s ===
- 1970 – (United Kingdom) Ken Buchanan
- 1971 – (United States) Joe Frazier (2)
- 1972 – (Argentina) Carlos Monzón
- 1973 – (United States) George Foreman
- 1974 – (United States) Muhammad Ali (2)
- 1975 – (United States) Muhammad Ali (3), (United States) Joe Frazier (3)
- 1976 – (United States) Howard Davis Jr., (United States) Leo Randolph, (United States) Sugar Ray Leonard, (United States) Leon Spinks, (United States) Michael Spinks
- 1977 – (United States) Ken Norton
- 1978 – (United States) Larry Holmes
- 1979 – (United States) Sugar Ray Leonard (2)

=== 1980s ===
- 1980 – (United States) Thomas Hearns
- 1981 – (United States) Sugar Ray Leonard (3)
- 1982 – (United States) Aaron Pryor
- 1983 – (United States) Marvin Hagler
- 1984 – (United States) Thomas Hearns (2)
- 1985 – (United States) Marvin Hagler (2)
- 1986 – (United States) Mike Tyson
- 1987 – (Mexico) Julio César Chávez
- 1988 – (United States) Mike Tyson (2)
- 1989 – (United States) Pernell Whitaker

=== 1990s ===
- 1990 – (United States) Evander Holyfield
- 1991 – (United States) James Toney
- 1992 – (United States) Riddick Bowe
- 1993 – (United States) Pernell Whitaker (2)
- 1994 – (United States) George Foreman (2)
- 1995 – (United States) Oscar De La Hoya
- 1996 – (United States) Evander Holyfield (2)
- 1997 – (United States) Evander Holyfield (3)
- 1998 – (United States) Shane Mosley
- 1999 – (Canada) (United Kingdom) Lennox Lewis

=== 2000s ===
- 2000 – (Puerto Rico) Félix Trinidad
- 2001 – (United States) Bernard Hopkins
- 2002 – (United States) Vernon Forrest
- 2003 – (United States) James Toney (2)
- 2004 – (Jamaica) Glen Johnson
- 2005 – (United Kingdom) Ricky Hatton
- 2006 – (Philippines) Manny Pacquiao
- 2007 – (United States) Floyd Mayweather Jr.
- 2008 – (Philippines) Manny Pacquiao (2)
- 2009 – (Philippines) Manny Pacquiao (3)

=== 2010s ===
- 2010 – (Argentina) Sergio Martínez
- 2011 – (United States) Andre Ward
- 2012 – (Philippines) Nonito Donaire
- 2013 – (United States) Floyd Mayweather Jr. (2)
- 2014 – (United States) Terence Crawford
- 2015 – (United States) Floyd Mayweather Jr. (3)
- 2016 – (United Kingdom) Carl Frampton
- 2017 – (Ukraine) Vasyl Lomachenko
- 2018 – (Ukraine) Oleksandr Usyk
- 2019 – (Mexico) Canelo Alvarez

=== 2020s ===
- 2020 – (United States) Teófimo López
- 2021 – (Mexico) Canelo Alvarez (2)
- 2022 – (Russia) Dmitry Bivol
- 2023 – (Japan) Naoya Inoue
- 2024 – (Ukraine) Oleksandr Usyk (2)
- 2025 – (United States) Terence Crawford (2)

== Joe Louis Fighter of the Decade ==
- 1990s: (United States) Roy Jones Jr.
- 2000s: (Philippines) Manny Pacquiao
- 2010s: (United States) Floyd Mayweather Jr.

== See also ==
- The Ring magazine Fighter of the Year
- Best Boxer ESPY Award, and its successor Best Fighter ESPY Award
