= Nery Saguilán =

Mexican boxer (born 1988)

Nery Sanguilán
Personal information
- Nickname: Pantera
- Born: Nery Antonio Sanguilán Vargas; 20 February 1988 (age 38) Mexico City, Mexico
- Height: 1.74 m (5 ft 9 in)

Boxing career
- Stance: Orthodox

Boxing record
- Total fights: 35
- Wins: 30
- Win by KO: 11
- Losses: 4
- Draws: 1

Nery Antonio Saguilán Vargas (born 20 February 1988) is a Mexican professional boxer. He is a former WBC Latino super featherweight champion and, since 19 July 2014, WBC USNBC Silver lightweight champion.

== Boxing career ==
Saguilán grew up in El Molinito, a small town in the municipality of Naucalpan, State of Mexico. Before becoming a professional boxer, he worked as a taxicab driver and construction worker. He debuted professionally on 27 April 2007 in Tlalnepantla, defeating fellow Mexican Daniel Simón after four rounds.

On 19 July 2014, in a bout staged at Hotel Azul Ixtapa in Ixtapa, Guerrero, Saguilán faced Seiichi Okada for the vacant WBC USNBC Silver lightweight title. He dispatched the Japanese pugilist in the eight round via technical knockout.
