= Best Boxer ESPY Award =

Annual athletic award

- Awarded for: Best Boxer
- Presented by: ESPN
- First award: 1993
- Final award: 2025
- Currently held by: Katie Taylor
- Website: www.espn.co.uk/espys/

The Best Boxer ESPY Award is presented annually to the professional or amateur boxer, irrespective of nationality, adjudged to be the best in a given calendar year. Active between 1993 and 2006, the Best Boxer ESPY Award was subsumed from 2007 to 2018 by the Best Fighter ESPY Award, for which both boxers and mixed martial arts fighters were eligible, and then revived in 2019 when a separate ESPY Award was created for Best MMA Fighter. In 2026, the Best Boxer ESPY Award was again subsumed by the Best Fighter ESPY Award following the reunification of the boxing and mixed martial arts categories.

Between 1993 and 2004, the award voting panel comprised variously fans; sportswriters and broadcasters, sports executives, and ESPN personalities, termed collectively experts; and retired sportspersons, but balloting thereafter was exclusively by fans over the Internet from amongst choices selected by the ESPN Select Nominating Committee.

Through the 2001 iteration of the ESPY Awards, ceremonies were conducted in February of each year to honor achievements over the previous calendar year; awards presented thereafter were conferred in June and reflected performance from the June previous.

== List of winners ==
Year	Fighter	Nation represented	Weight class represented
1993	Riddick Bowe	United States	Heavyweight
1994	Evander Holyfield	United States	Heavyweight
1995	George Foreman	United States	Heavyweight
1996	Roy Jones Jr.	United States	Super middleweight
1997	Evander Holyfield (2)	United States	Heavyweight
1998	Evander Holyfield (3)	United States	Heavyweight
1999	Oscar De La Hoya	United States	Welterweight
2000	Roy Jones Jr. (2)	United States	Light heavyweight
2001	Félix Trinidad	Puerto Rico	Junior middleweight
2002	Lennox Lewis	Canada/United Kingdom	Heavyweight
2003	Roy Jones Jr. (3)	United States	Light heavyweight/Heavyweight
2004	Antonio Tarver	United States	Light heavyweight
2005	Bernard Hopkins	United States	Middleweight
2006	Oscar De La Hoya (2)	United States	Junior middleweight
2019	Canelo Álvarez	Mexico	Middleweight
2020	Not awarded due to the COVID-19 pandemic		
2021	Tyson Fury	United Kingdom	Heavyweight
2022	Tyson Fury (2)	United Kingdom	Heavyweight
2023	Claressa Shields	United States	Welterweight
2024	Terence Crawford	United States	Welterweight
2025	Katie Taylor	Ireland	Super lightweight

== See also ==
- The Ring magazine Fighter of the Year
- Sugar Ray Robinson Award, by the Boxing Writers Association of America
