= Best Fighter ESPY Award =

Annual athletic award

- Awarded for: best fighter
- Presented by: ESPN
- First award: 2007
- Website: http://www.espn.com.au/espys/

The Best Fighter ESPY Award is an annual award honoring the achievements of an individual from the world of combat sports. The Best Fighter ESPY Award trophy is presented to the professional or amateur boxer or mixed martial artist adjudged to be the best in a given calendar year at the annual ESPY Awards ceremony in Los Angeles. It was first awarded as part of the ESPY Awards in 2007, subsuming the Best Boxer ESPY Award until 2019, when the Best MMA Fighter ESPY Award was established, and the ESPY Awards began awarding boxers and mixed martial arts fighters separately. In 2026, the separate awards were discontinued, and boxers and mixed martial arts fighters were once again nominated together in a single category. Balloting for the award was undertaken by fans over the Internet from between three and five choices selected by the ESPN Select Nominating Committee, which is composed of a panel of experts. It was conferred in July to reflect performance and achievement over the preceding twelve months.

The inaugural winner of the Best Fighter ESPY Award was American welterweight champion Floyd Mayweather Jr., who defeated the incumbent category title holder Oscar De La Hoya two months prior. He is one of three people to have been presented with the award more than once, winning the accolade a total of six times; Mayweather was also nominated in 2015. Filipino boxer Manny Pacquiao and American boxer Terence Crawford are tied for the second-most awards won, with Pacquiao winning in 2009 and 2011 and Crawford in 2018 and 2026. It has been presented to one woman in its history, American bantamweight mixed martial arts fighter Ronda Rousey in 2015. Between 2007 and 2018, boxers were most successful at the ESPY Awards with nine victories and twenty-four nominations, followed by mixed martial arts with three wins and nineteen nominations.

== Winners and nominees ==
Best Fighter ESPY Award winners and nominees
Year	Image	Winner	Nationality	Sport	Sanctioning body or league	Weight class	Nominees	Ref
2007	Floyd Mayweather Jr at a WWE event in 2008	Floyd Mayweather Jr.	USA	Boxing	—N/a	Welterweight	Miguel Cotto (PRI) – Boxing; Randy Couture (USA) – Mixed martial arts Quinton Jackson (USA) – Mixed martial arts Manny Pacquiao (PHL) – Boxing	
2008	Floyd Mayweather Jr. in 2010	Floyd Mayweather Jr. (2)	USA	Boxing	—N/a	Welterweight	Joe Calzaghe (GBR) – Boxing; Holly Holm (USA) – Boxing; Kelly Pavlik (USA) – Boxing; Georges St-Pierre (CAN) – Mixed martial arts	
2009	Manny Pacquiao in 2010	Manny Pacquiao	PHI	Boxing	—N/a	Light welterweight Welterweight	Lyoto Machida (BRA) – Mixed martial arts Shane Mosley (USA) – Boxing; Anderson Silva (BRA) – Mixed martial arts	
2010	Floyd Mayweather Jr. at a press conference in 2011	Floyd Mayweather Jr. (3)	USA	Boxing	—N/a	Welterweight	Manny Pacquiao (PHI) – Boxing; Georges St-Pierre (CAN) – Mixed martial arts	
2011	Manny Paquiao in 2011	Manny Pacquiao (2)	PHI	Boxing	—N/a	Welterweight	Bernard Hopkins (USA) – Boxing; Jon Jones (USA) – Mixed martial arts Sergio Martínez (ARG) – Boxing; Georges St-Pierre (CAN) – Mixed martial arts	
2012	Floyd Mayweather Jr at a promotional event in 2010	Floyd Mayweather Jr. (4)	USA	Boxing	—N/a	Welterweight	Jon Jones (USA) – Mixed martial arts Anderson Silva (BRA) – Mixed martial arts Andre Ward (USA) – Boxing	
2013	Floyd Mayweather Jr. at a press conference in 2011	Floyd Mayweather Jr. (5)	USA	Boxing	—N/a	Welterweight	Canelo Alvarez (MEX) – Boxing; Danny García (USA) – Boxing; Jon Jones (USA) – Mixed martial arts Anderson Silva (BRA) – Mixed martial arts	
2014	Floyd Mayweather Jr attending a press conference in 2011	Floyd Mayweather Jr. (6)	USA	Boxing	—N/a	Welterweight	Jon Jones (USA) – Mixed martial arts Manny Pacquiao (PHI) – Boxing; Ronda Rousey (USA) – Mixed martial arts Andre Ward (USA) – Boxing	
2015	Ronda Rousey in 2015	Ronda Rousey	USA	Mixed martial arts	UFC	Bantamweight	Donald Cerrone (USA) – Mixed martial arts Terence Crawford (USA) – Boxing; Gennady Golovkin (KAZ) – Boxing; Floyd Mayweather Jr. (USA) – Boxing	
2016	Conor McGregor speaking at a press conference in 2015	Conor McGregor	IRL	Mixed martial arts	UFC	Featherweight	Canelo Álvarez (MEX) – Boxing; Gennady Golovkin (KAZ) – Boxing; Román González (NIC) – Boxing; Robbie Lawler (USA) – Mixed martial arts	
2017	Demetrious Johnson in 2011	Demetrious Johnson	USA	Mixed martial arts	UFC	Flyweight	Terence Crawford (USA) – Boxing; Gennady Golovkin (KAZ) – Boxing; Conor McGregor (IRL) – Mixed martial arts Andre Ward (USA) – Boxing	
2018	Terence Crawford in 2023	Terence Crawford	USA	Boxing	—N/a	Light welterweight	Vasyl Lomachenko (UKR) – Boxing; Rose Namajunas (USA) – Mixed martial arts Georges St-Pierre (CAN) – Mixed martial arts	
2026	Terence Crawford in 2023	Terence Crawford (2)	USA	Boxing	—N/a	Super middleweight	Justin Gaethje (USA) – Mixed martial arts Claressa Shields (USA) – Boxing; Gabriela Fundora (USA) – Boxing	

== Statistics ==
Winners by nationality
Country	Winners	Nominations
USA	9	21
PHI	2	3
IRL	1	1
BRA	0	4
CAN	0	4
KAZ	0	3
MEX	0	2

Multiple winners and nominees
Name	Wins	Nominations
Floyd Mayweather Jr.	6	1
Manny Pacquiao	2	3
Terence Crawford	1	2
Conor McGregor	1	1
Ronda Rousey	1	1
Jon Jones	0	4
Georges St-Pierre	0	4
Gennady Golovkin	0	3
Anderson Silva	0	3
Andre Ward	0	3
Canelo Alvarez	0	2

== See also ==
- The Ring magazine Fighter of the Year
- Sugar Ray Robinson Award
