= Buddy Holderfield =

American boxer

Buddy Holderfield was the first boxer from Arkansas to have ever won the National Golden Gloves. He later went pro and lived in North Little Rock, Arkansas. He fought 48 professional bouts. He had a record of 27 wins, 20 losses and one draw. He was known for his clever fighting styles that won crowds over. He helped out at the North Little Rock Boy's Club and their boxing team. Holderfield was involved in professional boxing (1946-1955) along with Harold White (1946-1948) from Little Rock, both fought out of Memphis TN.
