= The Ring magazine Fighter of the Year =

Boxing award

The Ring magazine was established in 1922 and has named a Fighter of the Year since 1928, which this list covers. The award, selected by the magazine editors, is based on a boxer's performance in the ring.

== Award winners ==
Numbers in brackets indicate the number of times a boxer has won the award by that year.

=== 1920s ===
- 1928: Gene Tunney
- 1929: Tommy Loughran

=== 1930s ===
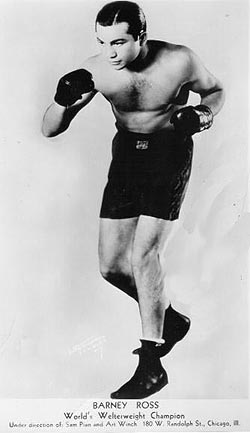
Barney Ross

- 1930: Max Schmeling
- 1931: Tommy Loughran (2)
- 1932: Jack Sharkey
- 1933: no award given
- 1934: Tony Canzoneri and Barney Ross
- 1935: Barney Ross (2)
- 1936: Joe Louis
- 1937: Henry Armstrong
- 1938: Joe Louis (2)
- 1939: Joe Louis (3)

=== 1940s ===
- 1940: Billy Conn
- 1941: Joe Louis (4)
- 1942: Sugar Ray Robinson
- 1943: Fred Apostoli
- 1944: Beau Jack
- 1945: Willie Pep
- 1946: Tony Zale
- 1947: Gus Lesnevich
- 1948: Ike Williams
- 1949: Ezzard Charles

=== 1950s ===
- 1950: Ezzard Charles (2)
- 1951: Sugar Ray Robinson (2)
- 1952: Rocky Marciano
- 1953: Bobo Olson
- 1954: Rocky Marciano (2)
- 1955: Rocky Marciano (3)
- 1956: Floyd Patterson
- 1957: Carmen Basilio
- 1958: Ingemar Johansson
- 1959: Ingemar Johansson (2)

=== 1960s ===
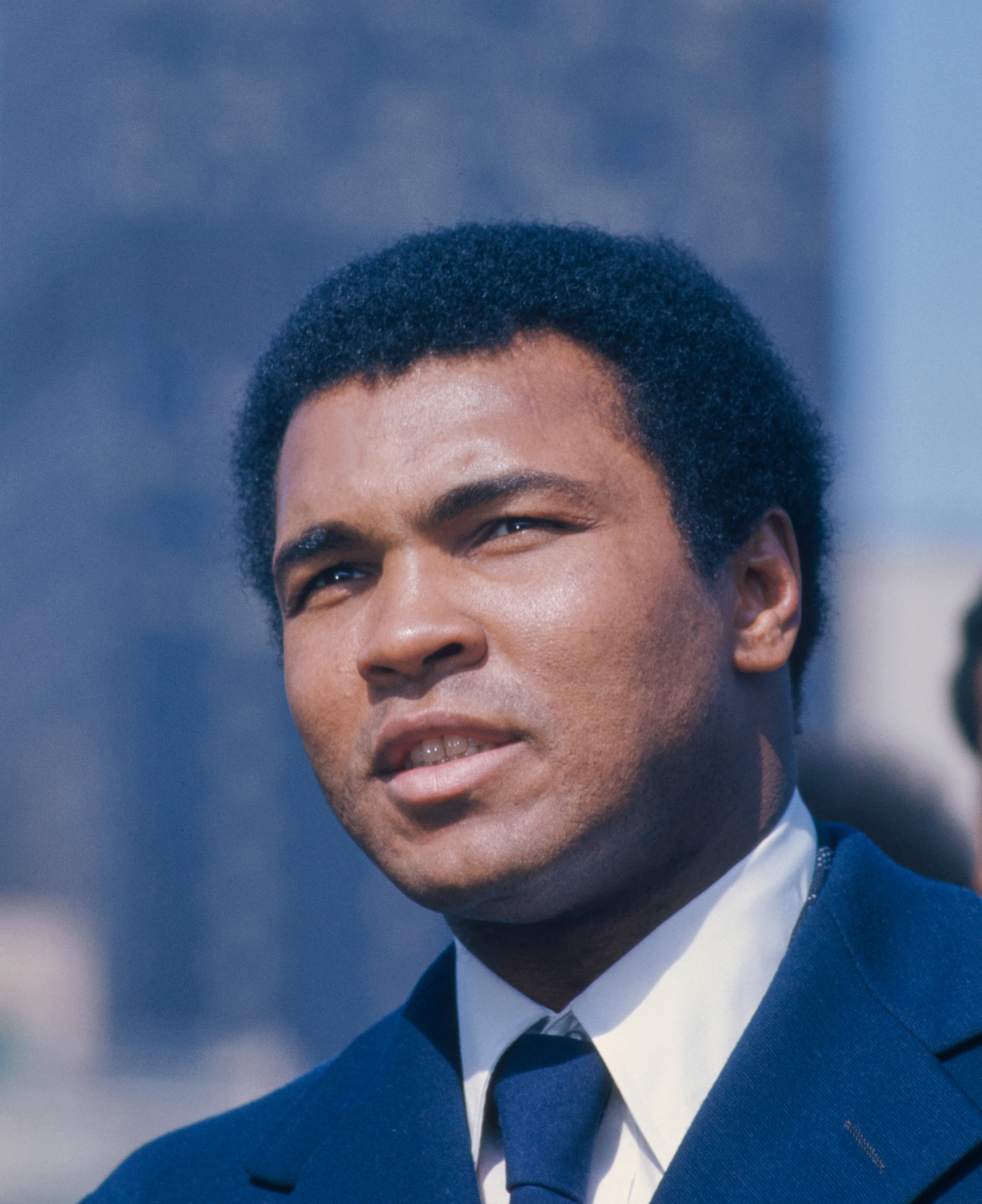
Muhammad Ali has been named Fighter of the Year more times than any other boxer in history. He was disqualified from the honor from 1964 to 1966 due to controversy over his religious and political beliefs, but it was retroactively awarded in December 2016. Ali won the award six times in total.

- 1960: Floyd Patterson (2)
- 1961: Joe Brown
- 1962: Dick Tiger
- 1963: Cassius Clay (Muhammad Ali)
- 1964: Emile Griffith
- 1965: Dick Tiger (2)
- 1966: Muhammad Ali (2) (originally not awarded; retroactively awarded in 2016)
- 1967: Joe Frazier
- 1968: Nino Benvenuti
- 1969: José Nápoles

=== 1970s ===
- 1970: Joe Frazier (2)
- 1971: Joe Frazier (3)
- 1972: Muhammad Ali (3) and Carlos Monzón
- 1973: George Foreman
- 1974: Muhammad Ali (4)
- 1975: Muhammad Ali (5)
- 1976: George Foreman (2)
- 1977: Carlos Zarate
- 1978: Muhammad Ali (6)
- 1979: Sugar Ray Leonard

=== 1980s ===
- 1980: Thomas Hearns
- 1981: Sugar Ray Leonard (2) and Salvador Sánchez
- 1982: Larry Holmes
- 1983: Marvin Hagler
- 1984: Thomas Hearns (2)
- 1985: Marvin Hagler (2) and Donald Curry
- 1986: Mike Tyson
- 1987: Evander Holyfield
- 1988: Mike Tyson (2)
- 1989: Pernell Whitaker

=== 1990s ===
- 1990: Julio César Chávez
- 1991: James Toney
- 1992: Riddick Bowe
- 1993: Michael Carbajal
- 1994: Roy Jones Jr.
- 1995: Oscar De La Hoya
- 1996: Evander Holyfield (2)
- 1997: Evander Holyfield (3)
- 1998: Floyd Mayweather Jr.
- 1999: Paulie Ayala

=== 2000s ===
- 2000: Félix Trinidad
- 2001: Bernard Hopkins
- 2002: Vernon Forrest
- 2003: James Toney (2)
- 2004: Glen Johnson
- 2005: Ricky Hatton
- 2006: Manny Pacquiao
- 2007: Floyd Mayweather Jr. (2)
- 2008: Manny Pacquiao (2)
- 2009: Manny Pacquiao (3)

=== 2010s ===
- 2010: Sergio Martínez
- 2011: Andre Ward
- 2012: Juan Manuel Márquez
- 2013: Adonis Stevenson
- 2014: Sergey Kovalev
- 2015: Tyson Fury
- 2016: Carl Frampton
- 2017: Vasiliy Lomachenko
- 2018: Oleksandr Usyk
- 2019: Canelo Álvarez

=== 2020s ===
- 2020: Tyson Fury (2) and Teófimo López
- 2021: Canelo Álvarez (2)
- 2022: Dmitry Bivol
- 2023: Naoya Inoue
- 2024: Oleksandr Usyk (2)
- 2025: Terence Crawford

== Fighter of the Decade ==
- 1910s: Sam Langford
- 1920s: Benny Leonard
- 1930s: Henry Armstrong
- 1940s: Sugar Ray Robinson
- 1950s: Sugar Ray Robinson (2)
- 1960s: Muhammad Ali
- 1970s: Roberto Durán
- 1980s: Sugar Ray Leonard
- 1990s: Roy Jones Jr.
- 2000s: Manny Pacquiao
- 2010s: Floyd Mayweather Jr.

== See also ==
- Sugar Ray Robinson Award, a similar award by the Boxing Writers Association of America
- Best Boxer ESPY Award and its successor, the Best Fighter ESPY Award
