= Brian O'Shea (boxer) =

American boxer

Brian O'Shea (born in Chicago, Illinois) is an American former boxer, referee, and judge.

== Personal ==
O'Shea is one of the fighting O'Shea brothers along with Rory O'Shea, Mike O'Shea and Tom O'Shea.

== Amateur career ==
O'Shea had an outstanding amateur career, having won several Chicago Golden Gloves Open division titles. The titles he won include a championship at 126 lbs. in 1957, and at lightweight (135 lbs.) in 1958, 1959, 1960 & 1961. The 1958 title came at the expense of his brother Tom, who later moved down in weight and won the 1960 Open Division 126 lb. title. In 1960 he also was the National Golden Gloves Lightweight Champion.

O'Shea was the National AAU Light Welterweight Champion in 1959, and won the 1960 132 lb championship. Also in 1960 he won the Chicago Golden Gloves Tournament of Champions in the 135 lb. division. In 1961 he won the Intercity Golden Gloves (alternate) in the 135 lb. division.

== Pro career ==
O'Shea turned pro in 1961 was undefeated until being TKO'd by John White in 1962. After another win streak, he again lost via KO to White in 1963. He retired in 1965.

== Referee and judge ==
O'Shea served as a boxing judge and referee after his pro career concluded.
