= Kaizer Mabuza =

South African boxer

Personal information
- Nickname: The Animal
- Nationality: South African
- Born: 1 January 1980 (age 46) Temba, Gauteng, South Africa
- Weight: Light welterweight Welterweight

Boxing career
- Stance: Orthodox

Boxing record
- Total fights: 44
- Wins: 26
- Win by KO: 15
- Losses: 15
- Draws: 3

Kaizer Mabuza (born 1 January 1980) is a South African professional boxer and former IBO super lightweight champion.

== Professional career ==
Kaizer Mabuza made his debut at lightweight and lost by TKO of the first round to future world champion, and fellow country man Isaac Hlatshwayo, who was also making his debut on 15 February 2000. He went on to win his next 9 fights 4 of them knockout. At a shot of redemption he fought again Isaac Hlatshwayo for his South African Lightweight title this time losing a twelve round unanimous decision.

Mabuza most recent fight came on 27 February 2010 in an IBF elimination bout against American Kendall Holt. Holt was a heavy favourite to win the fight, but took a severe beating from Mabuza and failed to come out of his corner for the sixth round.

On 5 March 2011 Mabuza lost via 7th round TKO to Zab Judah in a fight for the vacant IBF light welterweight championship.

== Professional boxing record (incomplete) ==
25 Wins (15 knockouts), 12 Losses (4 knockouts, 8 decisions) 3 Draws
| Res. | Opponent | Type | Rd | Date | Location | Notes |
| Loss | (South Africa) Zolani Marali | SD | 12 | 2014-07-18 | International Convention Centre, Eastern Cape, South Africa | For WBF Light Welterweight title. |
| Loss | (Russia) David Avanesyan | UD | 12 | 2014-04-18 | Basket-Hall, Krasnodar, Russia | For WBC Baltic Welterweight title. |
| Loss | (Namibia) Bethuel Ushona | UD | 12 | 2013-10-05 | Ramatex Factory, Windhoek, Namibia | For WBO African Welterweight title. |
| Win | (South Africa) Isaac Hlatshwayo | UD | 8 | 2013-03-02 | Sandton Convention Center, Johannesburg, South Africa | |
| Loss | (Russia) Khabib Allakhverdiev | KO | 4 (12) | 2012-06-20 | CSKA Moscow, Moscow, Russia | Lost IBO Light Welterweight title. |
| Win | (Australia) Steven Wills | TKO | 6 (12) | 2012-03-03 | Emperors Palace, Kempton Park, South Africa | Won vacant IBO Light Welterweight title. |
| Loss | (South Africa) Chris van Heerden | UD | 12 | 2011-09-24 | Emperors Palace, Kempton Park, South Africa | For vacant IBO Welterweight title. |
| Loss | (United States) Zab Judah | TKO | 7 (12) | 2011-03-05 | (United States) Prudential Center, Newark, New Jersey, South Africa | For vacant IBF Light Welterweight title. |
| Win | (United States) Kendall Holt | RTD | 6 (12) | 2010-02-27 | Bally's Atlantic City, Atlantic City, New Jersey, United States | IBF Light Welterweight title Eliminator. |
| Win | (Ukraine) Serhiy Fedchenko | MD | 12 | 2009-09-17 | Sportpalace Meteor, Dnipropetrovsk, Ukraine | Won IBF Inter-Continental Light Welterweight title. |
| Win | (South Africa) Thulani Mkhwanazi | TKO | 3 (12) | 2009-07-31 | Nasrec Indoor Arena, Johannesburg, Gauteng, South Africa | Retained South African Light Welterweight title. |
| Win | (South Africa) Samuel Malinga | MD | 12 | 2008-10-10 | Bloemfontein City Hall, Bloemfontein, Free State, South Africa | Retained WBA Pan African Light Welterweight title. Won South African Light Welterweight title. |
| Win | (Namibia) Jason Naule | KO | 3 (12) | 2008-08-16 | Windhoek Country Club Resort, Windhoek, Namibia | Retained WBA Pan African Light Welterweight title. |
| Win | (South Africa) Ephraim Swandle | TKO | 2 (6) | 2008-06-20 | Carousel Hotel & Casino, Temba, North-West, South Africa | |
| Win | (Namibia) Jason Naule | TKO | 11 (12) | 2008-03-20 | Windhoek Country Club Resort, Windhoek, Namibia | Won WBA Pan African Light Welterweight title. |
| Draw | (South Africa) Anthony Tshehla | PTS | 6 | 2008-02-01 | Graceland Casino, Secunda, Mpumalanga, South Africa | |

Achievements
| Preceded by Manny Pacquiao; Vacated | IBO super lightweight champion 3 March 2012 – 20 June 2012 | Succeeded by Khabib Allakhverdiyev |
