= Jan Zaveck =

Slovenian boxer

Dejan Zaveck
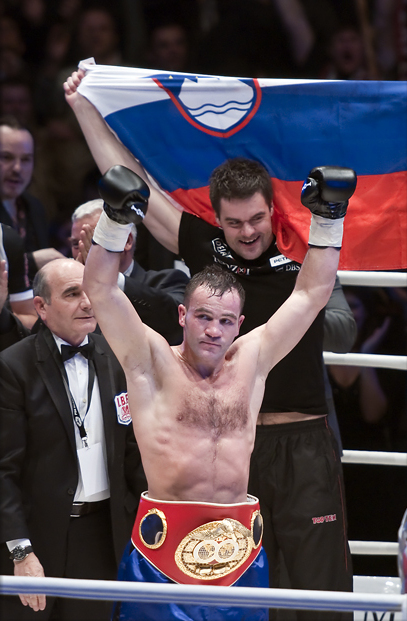
- Zaveck in 2011

Personal information
- Nickname: Mr. Sympathicus
- Nationality: Slovenian
- Born: Dejan Zavec; 13 March 1976 (age 50) Trdobojci, SFR Yugoslavia (now Slovenia)
- Height: 1.72 m (5 ft 8 in)
- Weight: Welterweight; Light-middleweight

Boxing career
- Stance: Orthodox

Boxing record
- Total fights: 40
- Wins: 35
- Win by KO: 19
- Losses: 4
- No contests: 1

Dejan Zavec (born 13 March 1976), best known as Jan Zaveck, is a Slovenian former professional boxer and a former politician who competed from 2003 to 2015. He held the IBF welterweight title from 2009 to 2011, and challenged once for the WBA super-welterweight title in 2015. Zaveck was the first Slovenian boxer to have held a world title, and was named Slovenian Sportsperson of the Year in 2010. From May 2022 to September 2023, he served as a member of the Slovenian National Assembly.

== Early life ==
Dejan Zavec was born in Trdobojci, Slovenia, then part of Yugoslavia. He spent his youth in Gabrnik in the Slovene Hills (Slovene: Slovenske gorice) and in Ptuj. He developed an interest in boxing at an early age. As a teenager, he joined the boxing club in Maribor. Later he resided in Gabrnik and in the city of Magdeburg, Saxony-Anhalt, Germany.

In 2006, he graduated from the Faculty for Physical Education in Novi Sad, Serbia.

== Professional career ==
=== Early career ===
Zavec started boxing at the age of 16. As an amateur, he fought in the 1995, 1997 and 1999 World championships.

Zavec turned professional in 2003, winning his first 26 fights. Early in his career, Zavec was briefly signed with Don King, but returned to Europe after the legendary promoter was unable to secure his bouts. Resuming his career in Germany with SES Boxing, Zavec earned a number of regional titles, including the WBO and IBF Inter-Continental and German (BDB) Welterweight Titles.

In 2008, Zavec traveled to Poland to meet Rafal Jackiewicz for the EBU European Welterweight Title. After twelve rounds, a controversial split decision was announced in the Polish fighter's favor. The bout was Zavec's first professional loss.

=== IBF welterweight champion ===
On December 11, 2009, Zavec won the IBF welterweight title against South African Isaac Hlatshwayo in a stunning upset via knockout. With this victory, Zavec became Slovenia's first-ever boxing world champion.

Zavec defended the IBF welterweight title for the first time against Rodolfo Martínez in Ljubljana, performing at the Tivoli Hall. He won by technical knockout in the twelfth round when the referee stopped the fight.

On September 4, 2010, Zavec defended the IBF welterweight title for the second time against mandatory challenger Rafał Jackiewicz at the Stožice Arena in Ljubljana. In defeating Jackiewicz, Zavec avenged what was his sole career loss at the time.

Zavec was expected to face the winner of Randall Bailey-Said Ouali IBF title-eliminator that took place December 10, 2010, but the bout was ruled a no-contest. With no mandatory challenger established, Zavec opted for an optional defense in Ljubljana. On February 18, 2011, Zavec defended the IBF welterweight title for the third time against #15-ranked Paul Delgado, performing again at the Stožice Arena, in front of 12,000 spectators. He won with a technical knockout in the fifth round, when the referee stopped the fight.

After discussions to fight Paulie Malignaggi on the Saul Alvarez-Ryan Rhodes undercard fell through, Zavec traveled to Biloxi, Mississippi to face former WBC light-welterweight champion Andre Berto on HBO on September 3, 2011. Despite being a 4-to-1 underdog coming into the fight, Zavec proved competitive; trading clean punches with Berto and earning praise from HBO's Roy Jones Jr. In the fifth round, a number of cuts opened on Zavec's face, which resulted in Zavec's corner waiving the fight off before the sixth round. The loss ended Zavec's reign as IBF welterweight champion.

=== Later career ===
After losing the IBF title, Zavec fought on for three more years; going the distance with future unified welterweight world champion Keith Thurman and challenging Erislandy Lara for the WBA and IBO Super Welterweight Titles in a TKO loss.

Zavec announced his retirement from boxing on March 13, 2016, at a press conference attended by Slovene President Borut Pahor.

== Professional boxing record ==
40 fights	35 wins	4 losses
By knockout	19	2
By decision	16	2
No contests	1	

No.	Result	Record	Opponent	Type	Round, time	Date	Location	Notes
40	Loss	35–4 (1)	Erislandy Lara	TKO	3 (12), 0:41	25 Nov 2015	Park Race Track, Hialeah, Florida, US	For WBA (Regular) and IBO light-middleweight titles
39	Win	35–3 (1)	Sasha Yengoyan	UD	12	11 Apr 2015	Tabor Hall, Maribor, Slovenia	Won WBF (Federation) light-middleweight title
38	Win	34–3 (1)	Ferenc Hafner	TKO	7 (12)	14 Oct 2014	Tabor Hall, Maribor, Slovenia	Won vacant WBO European light-middleweight title
37	Win	33–3 (1)	Sebastien Allais	UD	8	19 Nov 2013	Trade Fair, Leipzig, Germany	
36	Loss	32–3 (1)	Keith Thurman	UD	12	9 Mar 2013	Barclays Center, New York City, New York, US	Lost WBO Inter-Continental welterweight title
35	Win	32–2 (1)	Bethuel Ushona	UD	12	24 Mar 2012	Tabor Hall, Maribor, Slovenia	Won vacant WBO Inter-Continental welterweight title
34	Loss	31–2 (1)	Andre Berto	RTD	5 (12), 3:00	3 Sep 2011	Beau Rivage, Biloxi, Mississippi, US	Lost IBF welterweight title
33	Win	31–1 (1)	Paul Delgado	KO	5 (12)	18 Feb 2011	Arena Stožice, Ljubljana, Slovenia	Retained IBF welterweight title
32	Win	30–1 (1)	Rafał Jackiewicz	MD	12	4 Sep 2010	Arena Stožice, Ljubljana, Slovenia	Retained IBF welterweight title
31	Win	29–1 (1)	Rodolfo Ezequiel Martinez	TKO	12 (12), 2:20	9 Apr 2010	Tivoli Hall, Ljubljana, Slovenia	Retained IBF welterweight title
30	Win	28–1 (1)	Isaac Hlatshwayo	TKO	3 (12), 2:55	11 Dec 2009	Wembley Indoor Stadium, Johannesburg, South Africa	Won IBF welterweight title
29	Win	27–1 (1)	Jorge Daniel Miranda	KO	12 (12)	19 Jun 2009	Tabor Hall, Maribor, Slovenia	
28	Win	26–1 (1)	Arek Malek	UD	6	15 May 2009	Bördelandhalle, Magdeburg, Germany	
27	Loss	25–1 (1)	Rafał Jackiewicz	SD	12	29 Nov 2008	Spodek, Katowice, Poland	For European welterweight title
26	Win	25–0 (1)	Marco Cattikas	UD	12	15 Jun 2008	Tabor Hall, Maribor, Slovenia	Won vacant IBF Inter-Continental welterweight title
25	Win	24–0 (1)	Pietro d'Alessio	TKO	4 (8), 2:33	19 Jan 2008	Burg-Wächter Castello, Düsseldorf, Germany	
24	Win	23–0 (1)	Albert Starikov	UD	10	13 Oct 2007	Hermann-Gieseler-Halle, Magdeburg, Germany	Retained German International welterweight title
23	NC	22–0 (1)	Jorge Daniel Miranda	NC	3 (12), 1:48	12 Jun 2007	Tabor Hall, Maribor, Slovenia	Vacant WBO Inter-Continental welterweight title at stake; NC after Zaveck was cut
22	Win	22–0	Nicolas Guisset	UD	12	17 Feb 2007	Maritim Hotel, Magdeburg, Germany	Won vacant European Union welterweight title
21	Win	21–0	Andrey Yeskin	TKO	10 (12), 2:30	23 May 2006	Športna dvorana Center, Ptuj, Slovenia	Retained WBO Inter-Continental welterweight title
20	Win	20–0	Joel Mayo	TD	6 (12), 1:50	25 Mar 2006	TURM ErlebnisCity, Brandenburg, Germany	Retained WBO Inter-Continental welterweight title; Won vacant IBF Inter-Continental welterweight title; Unanimous TD after Mayo was cut from an accidental head clash
19	Win	19–0	Serge Vigne	TKO	5 (8), 2:35	29 Oct 2005	TURM ErlebnisCity, Brandenburg, Germany	
18	Win	18–0	Mikhail Boyarskikh	TKO	8 (12), 2:07	20 Sep 2005	T-Mobile Arena, Prague, Czech Republic	Won vacant WBO Inter-Continental welterweight title
17	Win	17–0	Joseph Sovijus	KO	3 (6)	18 Jun 2005	Pula Arena, Pula, Croatia	
16	Win	16–0	Danilo Alcantara	TKO	2 (6), 2:04	2 Feb 2005	Ofen-Stadthalle, Brandenburg, Germany	
15	Win	15–0	Martins Kukulis	KO	4 (6), 1:56	15 Jan 2005	Bördelandhalle, Magdeburg, Germany	
14	Win	14–0	Jurijs Boreiko	MD	6	18 Sep 2004	Hermann-Gieseler-Halle, Magdeburg, Germany	
13	Win	13–0	Arthur Nowak	TKO	8 (10)	17 Jul 2004	Anhalt Arena, Dessau, Germany	Won vacant German International welterweight title
12	Win	12–0	Boubacar Sidibe	UD	8	5 Jun 2004	Maritim Hotel, Magdeburg, Germany	
11	Win	11–0	Viktor Baranov	UD	12	17 Apr 2004	Maribor, Slovenia	Won vacant NBA Inter-Continental welterweight title
10	Win	10–0	Nikita Zaytsev	SD	8	21 Feb 2004	Ballhaus-Arena, Aschersleben, Germany	
9	Win	9–0	Rozalin Nasibulin	TKO	5 (8)	29 Nov 2003	Lausitz Arena, Cottbus, Germany	
8	Win	8–0	Andrzej Butowicz	UD	6	17 Nov 2003	Ústí nad Labem, Czech Republic	
7	Win	7–0	Leonti Vorontsuk	TKO	2, 2:44	20 Sep 2003	Maritim Hotel, Magdeburg, Germany	
6	Win	6–0	Kamel Ikene	TKO	2 (6), 2:14	5 Jul 2003	Anhalt Arena, Dessau, Germany	
5	Win	5–0	Artur Drinaj	TKO	2	14 Jun 2003	Bördelandhalle, Magdeburg, Germany	
4	Win	4–0	Nikita Zaitsev	TKO	2	21 May 2003	Hradec Králové, Czech Republic	
3	Win	3–0	Patrik Hruska	UD	6	25 Apr 2003	Maritim Hotel, Magdeburg, Germany	
2	Win	2–0	Nico Salzmann	PTS	6	21 Mar 2003	Jump Trampolinpark, Berlin, Germany	
1	Win	1–0	Zsolt Toth	TKO	1 (4), 1:00	1 Mar 2003	Ballhaus-Arena, Aschersleben, Germany	

Sporting positions
Regional boxing titles
Vacant Title last held by Turgay Uzun	German International welterweight champion 17 July 2004 – 2010; Vacated	Vacant Title next held by Stefan Worth
Vacant Title last held by Zab Judah	WBO Inter-Continental welterweight champion 20 September 2005 – October 2006; Vacated	Vacant Title next held by Luciano Abis
Vacant Title last held by Cristian De Martinis	IBF Inter-Continental welterweight champion 25 March 2006 – July 2006; Vacated	Vacant Title next held by Joshua Clottey
Vacant Title last held by Michel Trabant	European Union welterweight champion 17 February 2007 – November 2007; Vacated	Vacant Title next held by Daniele Petrucci
Vacant Title last held by Giammario Grassellini	IBF Inter-Continental welterweight champion 15 June 2008 – 11 December 2009; Won world title	Vacant Title next held by Daniele Petrucci
Vacant Title last held by Frankie Gavin	WBO Inter-Continental welterweight champion 24 March 2012 – 9 March 2013	Succeeded by Keith Thurman
Vacant Title last held by Attila Kovács	WBO European light-middleweight champion 17 October 2014 – April 2015; Vacated	Vacant Title next held by Predrag Radosevic
Minor world boxing titles
Preceded by Sasha Yengoyan	WBF (Federation) light-middleweight champion 11 April 2015 – November 2015; Vacated	Vacant Title next held by Fariz Mammadov
Major world boxing titles
Preceded by Isaac Hlatshwayo	IBF welterweight champion 11 December 2009 – 3 September 2011	Succeeded by Andre Berto
