= Miguel Cotto vs. Joshua Clottey =

Boxing match

Knockout Power
- Date: June 13, 2009
- Venue: Madison Square Garden, New York City, New York, U.S.
- Title(s) on the line: WBO welterweight title

Tale of the tape
Boxer	Miguel Cotto	Joshua Clottey
Nickname	Junito	The Grand Master
Hometown	Caguas, Puerto Rico	Accra, Ghana
Pre-fight record	33–1 (27 KO)	35–2 (21 KO)
Age	28 years, 7 months	31 years, 8 months
Height	5 ft 8 in (173 cm)	5 ft 8 in (173 cm)
Weight	146 lb (66 kg)	147 lb (67 kg)
Style	Orthodox	Orthodox
Recognition	WBO; Welterweight Champion; The Ring; No. 2 Ranked Welterweight	WBO; No. 1 Ranked Welterweight; The Ring; No. 4 Ranked Welterweight; Former welterweight champion

Result
- Cotto wins via 12-round split decision (116–111, 115–112, 113–114)

Miguel Cotto vs. Joshua Clottey, billed as Knockout Power, was a professional boxing match contested on June 13, 2009, for the WBO welterweight title.

== Background ==
In early March 2009, it was announced that WBO welterweight champion Miguel Cotto, who had won the vacant title after defeating Michael Jennings the previous month, would make his first title defense against IBF welterweight champion Joshua Clottey after Cotto's promotional firm, Top Rank, passed on Cotto's countryman Kermit Cintrón and then WBC welterweight champion Andre Berto. The fight was originally planned to be a unification bout with both Cotto and Clottey's respective titles on the line. However, though Clottey completed the necessary paperwork to meet the IBF's deadline to approve the unification, Cotto was late in filing his, which caused the IBF to instead insist that Clottey next face their highest available contender Isaac Hlatshwayo or be stripped of their title. Though Clottey, who had announced his intentions to go through with the more lucrative Cotto fight, wrote a letter to the IBF asking the organization to reconsider its decision, the IBF refused and stripped Clottey of the title roughly a week later.

== Fight Details ==
Cotto got off to a good start in the first round when he scored with a short right hook that sent Clottey down to the canvas, giving Cotto a big 10–8 round, which would be key in him ultimately winning the fight. The fight would remain close for the next few rounds with Cotto building about a lead on all three scorecards after four rounds, however, in the closing seconds, an accident clash of heads led to Cotto receiving a deep gash above his left eye, which would bleed throughout the rest of the fight and hamper Cotto, though the ringside physician would clear him to continue. Clottey would also suffer an injury the following round, injuring his leg when a botched Cotto clinch spun Clottey around and sent him to the canvas with a leg injury, forcing the referee to halt the action to give Clottey, who decided to continue with the fight, time to recover.

In what was an extremely close fight, Cotto earned the victory via a narrow split decision, being named the winner on two of the official scorecards, 116–111 and 115–112, while Clottey took five of the last six rounds and was named the victor on the third scorecard 114–113.

== Aftermath ==
Angered with the decision, Cottey said afterwards "I threw the hardest punches. People said I'd lose the decision if it went to a decision, and it did. They robbed me."

== Fight card ==
Confirmed bouts:

Weight Class	Weight		vs.		Method	Round	Notes
Welterweight	147 lbs.	Miguel Cotto	def.	Joshua Clottey	SD	12	^{note 1}
Light Flyweight	108 lbs.	Iván Calderón	vs.	Rodel Mayol	TD	6/12	^{note 2}
Super Featherweight	130 lbs.	Rafael Guzmán	def.	Juan Carlos Martínez	SD	6
Featherweight	126 lbs.	Jorge Diaz	def.	Guadalupe De Leon	UD	6
Super Bantamweight	122 lbs.	Jayson Vélez	def.	Jesus Bayron	TKO	3/6
Middleweight	160 lbs.	Glen Tapia	def.	David Lopez	UD	4
Super Middleweight	168 lbs.	Matt Korobov	def.	Loren Myers	UD	4
Super Lightweight	140 lbs.	Alberto Cruz	def.	Rudy Valdez	RTD	2/4

^Note 1 For WBO Welterweight Title
^Note 2 For Vacant WBO Light Flyweight Title

== Broadcasting ==
Country	Broadcaster
Ireland & United Kingdom	Setanta Sports
United States	HBO

Preceded by vs. Michael Jennings	Miguel Cotto's bouts 13 June 2009	Succeeded by vs. Manny Pacquiao
Preceded by vs. Zab Judah	Joshua Clottey's bouts 13 June 2009	Succeeded by vs. Manny Pacquiao
