= Trdobojci =

- Location in Slovenia
- Coordinates: 46°19′26.12″N 15°55′32.06″E
- Country: Slovenia
- Traditional region: Styria
- Statistical region: Drava
- Municipality: Videm

Area
  - Total: 3.92 km^{2} (1.51 sq mi)
- Elevation: 315.2 m (1,034 ft)

Population (2002)
  - Total: 103

Trdobojci (pronounced [təɾdɔˈboːi̯tsi]; German: Terdoboitzen) is a settlement in the Haloze Hills in the Municipality of Videm in eastern Slovenia. The area is part of the traditional region of Styria. It is now included in the Drava Statistical Region. It includes the hamlets of Spodnji Trdobojci (German: Unterterdoboitzen) and Zgornji Trdobojci (German: Oberterdoboitzen).

== Name ==
Trdobojci was attested in written sources in 1440 as Terdowoycz. It is believed to be a plural demonym (via *Tvьrdobǫd-j-ьci) based on the Slavic personal name *Tvьrdobǫdъ, a clipped form of the older *Tvьrdobǫd-je (selo) 'Tvьrdobǫdъ's village'. The first element of the compound name, tvьrd, means 'hard', and the second, bǫdъ, is an imperative of the verb biti; the name Tvьrdobǫdъ thus meant 'be hard'.

== Notable people ==
Notable people that were born or lived in Trdobojci include:

- Dejan Zavec (born 1976), IBF Welterweight Champion
