= Carlos Herrera (boxer) =

Argentine boxer

Personal information
- Nickname: El Gitano
- Born: Carlos Leonardo Herrera; 27 March 1983 (age 43) San Justo, Santa Fe, Argentina
- Height: 6 ft 1 in (185 cm)
- Weight: Middleweight; Light middleweight

Boxing career
- Reach: 75 in (191 cm)
- Stance: Orthodox

Boxing record
- Total fights: 31
- Wins: 24
- Win by KO: 10
- Losses: 7
- Draws: 0
- No contests: 0

Carlos Leonardo Herrera (born 27 March 1983) is an Argentine former professional boxer who competed from 2006 to 2014.

== Professional career ==
On 15 September 2009 Herrera lost by first-round knockout to top welterweight prospect Canelo Álvarez.

=== Professional boxing record ===
24 Wins (10 knockouts), 7 Losses, 0 Draw
Res.	Record	Opponent	Type	Rd., Time	Date	Location	Notes
Loss	24-7	(Canada) Kevin Bizier	TKO	2 (8)	2014-05-24	Bell Centre, Montreal, Quebec, Canada	
Loss	24-6	(Russia) David Avanesyan	KO	2 (10)	2013-11-04	Basket Hall, Krasnodar, Russia	For vacant WBC Baltic welterweight title
Loss	24-5	(Argentina) Mateo Damian Veron	TKO	5 (8)	2012-12-21	Club Universitario, La Plata, Buenos Aires, Argentina	
Win	24-4	(Argentina) Mario Javier Nieva	UD	8 (8)	2012-03-09	Club San Justino, San Justo, Santa Fe, Argentina	
Win	23-4	(Argentina) Francisco Nicolas Benitez	KO	3 (6)	2011-06-26	San Justo, Santa Fe, Argentina	
Loss	22-4	(France) Moez Fhima	UD	12 (12)	2011-04-15	Salle Marcel Dufour, Louvroil, Nord, France	For vacant WBC Latino light middleweight title
Win	22-3	(Argentina) Claudio Roberto Fernandez	TKO	3 (6)	2010-06-25	Club San Justino, San Justo, Santa Fe, Argentina	
Loss	21-3	(Argentina) Jorge Daniel Miranda	UD	10 (10)	2010-04-03	Club Social y Deportivo Sarmiento, Villa Sarmiento, Cordoba, Argentina	
Loss	21-2	(Mexico) Canelo Álvarez	TKO	1 (10)	2009-09-15	Auditorio Siglo XXI, Puebla, Puebla, Mexico	
Win	21-1	(Argentina) Claudio Roberto Fernandez	KO	8 (8)	2009-06-25	San Justo, Santa Fe, Argentina	
Win	20-1	(Argentina) Daniel Alberto Montenegro	RTD	5 (10)	2009-05-21	Club San Justino, San Justo, Santa Fe, Argentina	
Win	19-1	(Argentina) Jorge Daniel Miranda	KO	10 (10)	2009-03-20	Ce.De.M. N° 2, Caseros, Buenos Aires, Argentina	
Win	18-1	(Argentina) Ariel Oscar Pieroni	UD	8 (8)	2008-11-28	San Justo, Santa Fe, Argentina	
Loss	17-1	(Argentina) Juan Manuel Alaggio	UD	6 (6)	2008-10-10	Ce.De.M. N° 2, Caseros, Buenos Aires, Argentina	
Win	17-0	(Argentina) Juan Manuel Alaggio	UD	8 (8)	2008-08-06	Ce.De.M. N° 1, Caseros, Buenos Aires, Argentina	
Win	16-0	(Argentina) Cesar Adrian Sastre Silva	UD	6 (6)	2008-05-17	Club Quilmes, Rafaela, Santa Fe, Argentina	
Win	15-0	(Argentina) Juan Jose Dias	UD	6 (6)	2008-04-26	Ce.De.M. N° 2, Caseros, Buenos Aires, Argentina	
Win	14-0	(Argentina) Juan Jose Dias	UD	6 (6)	2008-01-18	Club Atletico Rafaela, Rafaela, Santa Fe, Argentina	
Win	13-0	(Argentina) Cristian Gustavo Sosa	KO	2 (4)	2007-12-08	Club Tomas de Rocamora, Concepción del Uruguay, Entre Rios, Argentina	
Win	12-0	(Argentina) Jorge Antonio Asaad	KO	4 (6)	2007-11-10	Estadio Municipal, Perez, Santa Fe, Argentina	
