= Manny Pacquiao vs. Joshua Clottey =

Boxing match

The Event
- Date: March 13, 2010
- Venue: Cowboys Stadium, Arlington, Texas, U.S.
- Title on the line: WBO welterweight title

Tale of the tape
Boxer	Manny Pacquiao	Joshua Clottey
Nickname	Pac-Man	The Grand Master
Hometown	General Santos, Philippines	Accra, Ghana
Pre-fight record	50–3–2 (38 KO)	35–3 (20 KO)
Age	31 years, 2 months	32 years, 5 months
Height	5 ft 6 1/2 in (169 cm)	5 ft 8 in (173 cm)
Weight	145 3/4 lb (66 kg)	147 lb (67 kg)
Style	Southpaw	Orthodox
Recognition	WBO; Welterweight Champion; The Ring; Light Welterweight Champion; The Ring; No. 1 Ranked Welterweight; The Ring No. 1 ranked pound-for-pound fighter 7-division world champion	WBO; No. 1 Ranked Welterweight; The Ring; No. 5 Ranked Welterweight; Former IBF welterweight champion

Result
- Pacquiao wins via 12-round unanimous decision (120–108, 119–109, 119–109)

Manny Pacquiao vs. Joshua Clottey, billed as The Event, was a professional boxing match contested on March 13, 2010, for the WBO welterweight championship. The bout was held at Cowboys Stadium, in Arlington, Texas, U.S. This match was put together after the long awaited superfight between Manny Pacquiao and Floyd Mayweather Jr. had fallen through.

== Background ==
Following Pacquiao's victory against Cotto, there was much public demand for a fight between the two best pound-for-pound fighters in the world: Pacquiao and Floyd Mayweather Jr. Pacquiao reportedly agreed to fight Mayweather on March 13, 2010, for a split of 50 million dollars up front. And it was later agreed that the venue for the fight would be the MGM Grand Las Vegas. However, the bout was put in jeopardy due to disagreements about Olympic-style drug testing. The Mayweather camp wanted random blood testing by the United States Anti-Doping Agency, whereas Pacquiao refused to have any blood testing within 30 days from the fight, because he thought it would weaken him, but he was willing to have blood taken from him before the 30-day window as well as immediately after the fight. Freddie Roach, on the other hand, commented that he would allow blood to be taken from Pacquiao one week before the fight. In an attempt to resolve their differences, the two camps went through a process of mediation before a retired judge. After the mediation process, Mayweather claimed that he agreed to a 14-day no blood testing window, however, Pacquiao refused and instead only agreed to a 24-day no blood testing window. Consequently, on January 7, 2010, Pacquiao's promoter Bob Arum declared that the fight was officially off.

Pacquiao agreed to random blood testing above and beyond that which is required by the rules of the Nevada State Athletic Commission, but not to the extent requested by Mayweather. Despite producing no evidence to back their claims (Pacquiao has been drug tested for all of his past fights in Las Vegas and has passed them all), the Mayweather camp had repeatedly suggested Pacquiao was using banned substances throughout the negotiations, which resulted in Pacquiao filing a lawsuit for defamation, seeking damages in excess of 75,000 dollars. The lawsuit cited accusations made by Mayweather, Floyd Mayweather Sr., Roger Mayweather, Oscar De La Hoya, and Golden Boy Promotions CEO Richard Schaefer. The lawsuit claimed that the damaging and unfounded accusations were made out of "ill-will, spite, malice, revenge, and envy." Pacquiao stated: "I maintain and assure everyone that I have not used any form or kind of steroids and that my way to the top is a result of hard work, hard work, hard work and a lot of blood spilled from my past battles in the ring, not outside of it."

After negotiations for the Mayweather fight fell through, other boxers were considered to replace Mayweather as the next opponent for Pacquiao, including former light welterweight champion Paul Malignaggi and current WBA super welterweight champion Yuri Foreman, while Mayweather considered Malignaggi and the smaller Nate Campbell as potential opponents for his next fight. However, Pacquiao chose to fight Joshua Clottey instead, a tough boxer from Ghana and the former IBF welterweight champion.

== The fight ==
Pacquiao won every round and ultimately the fight through a unanimous decision. He dominated the punch count throughout the fight. Clottey landed some successful punches in the middle rounds, but never produced a sustained offensive. Manny Pacquiao defended his title by unanimous decision, 120-108, 119-109, 119-109. After the fight, Pacquiao returned to Manila. At the time, he reflected on a possible retirement.

The fight was rewarded with a paid crowd of 36,371 and a gate of $6,359,985, according to post-fight tax reports filed with Texas boxing regulators. Counting complimentary tickets delivered to sponsors, media outlets and others, the Dallas fight attracted 41,843, well short of the 50,994 that was previously announced, but still an epic number for boxing. In addition, the bout drew 700,000 pay-per-view buys and earned $35.3 million in domestic revenue.

== Undercard ==
Confirmed bouts:

Winner	Loser	Weight division/title belt(s) disputed	Result
(Mexico) Humberto Soto	(United States) David Diaz	vacant WBC World Lightweight title	Unanimous decision
(Mexico) Alfonso Gómez	(Mexico) José Luis Castillo	WBC Continental Americas welterweight title	6th round RTD
(Republic of Ireland) John Duddy	(Mexico) Michael Medina	Middleweight (10 rounds)	Split decision
Non-TV bouts
(Philippines) Eden Sonsona	(Colombia) Mauricio Pastrana	Bantamweight (8 rounds)	8th round TKO
(Philippines) Michael Farenas	(United States) Joe Morales	Super featherweight (8 rounds)	No contest
(Mexico) Salvador Sánchez II	(Mexico) Jaime Villa	Super featherweight (8 rounds)	6th round TKO
(United States) Roberto Marroquin	(United States) Samuel Sanchez	Super bantamweight (8 rounds)	2nd round KO
(Mexico) Rodrigo Garcia	(United States) Calvin Pitts	Light middleweight (4 rounds)	2nd round TKO
(United States) Arthur Trevino	(United States) Isaac Hidalgo	Featherweight (4 rounds)	Majority draw

== Broadcasting ==
Country	Broadcaster
Australia	Main Event
Hungary	Sport 1
Poland	Polsat Sport
Philippines	Solar Sports (Pay, live)
Philippines	GMA Network and Solar TV (Terrestrial, delayed)
United Kingdom	Sky Sports
United States	HBO

Preceded by vs. Miguel Cotto	Manny Pacquiao's bouts 13 March 2010	Succeeded by vs. Antonio Margarito
Preceded by vs. Miguel Cotto	Joshua Clottey's bouts 13 March 2010	Succeeded by vs. Calvin Green
