= Delvin Rodríguez =

Dominican Republic boxer (born 1980)

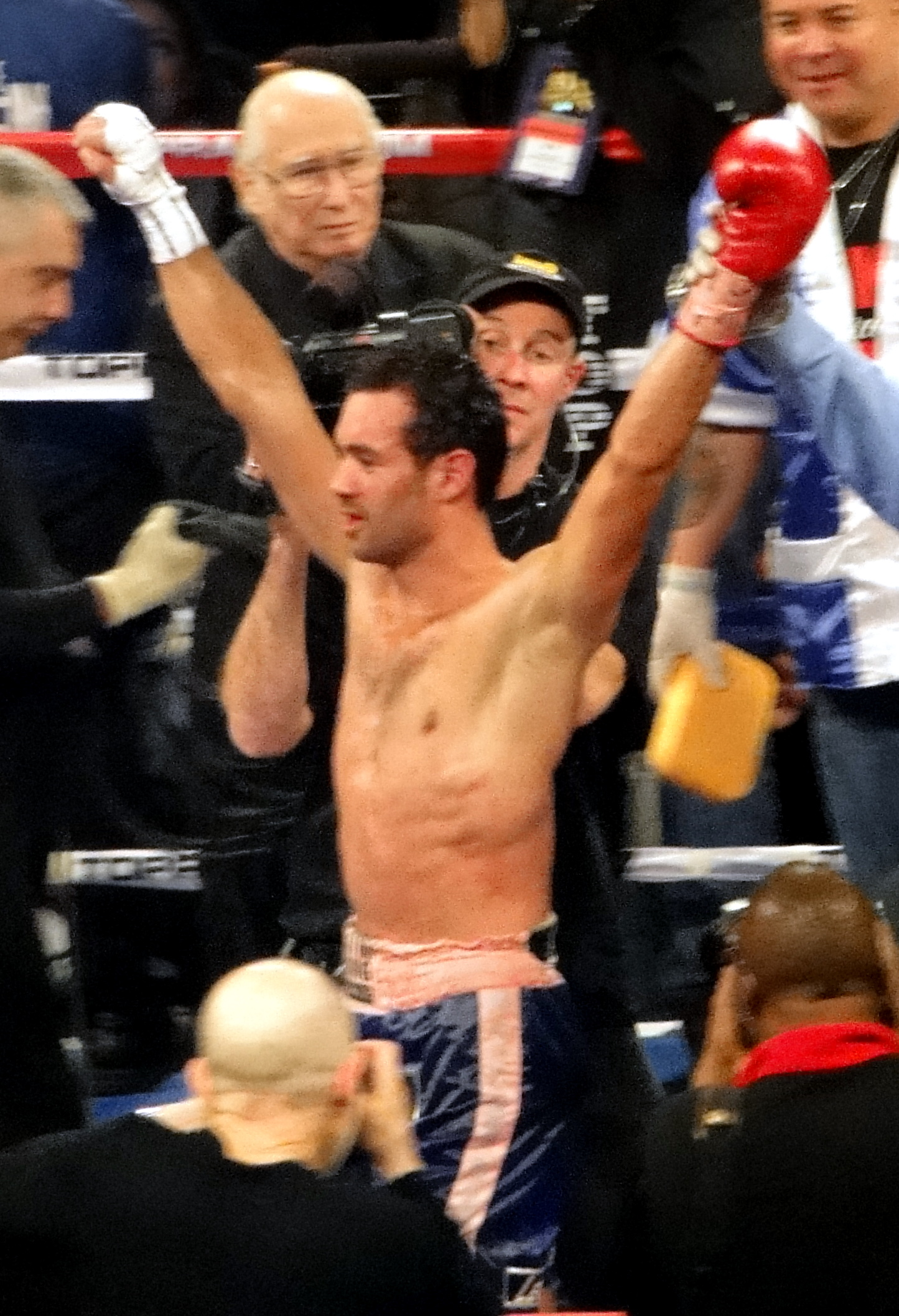
- Rodriguez in 2011

Personal information
- Nickname: The Jaguar
- Nationality: Dominican
- Born: Delvin Antonio Rodríguez; May 4, 1980 (age 46) Santiago de los Caballeros, Dominican Republic
- Height: 6 ft 0 in (183 cm)
- Weight: Welterweight; Light middleweight

Boxing career
- Reach: 73 in (185 cm)
- Stance: Orthodox

Boxing record
- Total fights: 42
- Wins: 29
- Win by KO: 16
- Losses: 9
- Draws: 4

Delvin Antonio Rodríguez (born May 4, 1980) is a Dominican professional boxer who has challenged three times for a world title (once at welterweight and twice at light middleweight).

== Professional career ==
=== Welterweight ===
Delvin defeated Shamone Alvarez in a title eliminator bout on ESPN's Friday Night Fights at the Mohegan Sun Casino in Connecticut. The official score cards of the judges had it 115 to 112 and two other judges had the same score card at 114 to 113 all to Rodriguez.

==== Rodríguez vs. Hlatshwayo ====
In 2008, he fought to a draw with Isaac Hlatshwayo in Gauteng, South Africa. It was obvious that Rodriguez was the much busier boxer as he would throw beautiful 3 and 4 punch combinations from the outside. In the middle rounds that fight had become a classic boxer vs. brawler with Isaac taking control. In the 9th round, just as both the round and the fight seemed to going Issac's way in a slight manner, Rodriguez landed a perfected right that sent Hlatshwayo down and make the fight become even more closely contested. Isaac was rewarded a split decision victory over Rodriguez. Upon further review of the scorecard however, it was revealed there was a mistake made in calculating on one of the judges scoring. As a result, the fight was changed to its correct decision, a majority decision.

In 2009, Rodriguez again had the "home advantage" when they met in a rematch for the vacant IBF welterweight title at the Mohegan Sun in Connecticut, nine months after their first meeting. Rodriguez fought well, but Isaac dug that bit deeper to win their IBF title fight on a split but well-earned decision.

Rodriguez went on to lose his next fight, to Rafal Jackiewicz in an IBF title eliminator. It was a close fight in Jackiewicz's home country of Poland, and Rodriguez lost a tight decision.

Rodriguez bounced back with a lopsided decision against a faded Mike Arnaoutis in March 2010 before losing a majority decision to Ashley Theophane in July 2010.

=== Light middleweight ===
==== Rodríguez vs. Wolak ====
Rodriguez, who moved up to 154 pounds, battled to a 10-round draw in an exhilarating slugfest at New York's Roseland Ballroom on July 15, 2011, in one of the all-time great battles in the history of ESPN2's "Friday Night Fights" with Pawel Wolak. By the seventh round, Wolak's right eye was grotesquely swollen and virtually closed, but he refused to quit and continued marching forward. They put on what might as well have been a new Arturo Gatti vs. Micky Ward fight, going to a majority draw. The fight was selected as SI.com's 2011 Fight of the Year.

In the rematch, Rodriguez won a unanimous decision over Wolak on the HBO Pay Per View televised undercard of Miguel Cotto vs. Antonio Margarito on December 3, 2011.

==== Rodríguez vs. Cotto ====
Rodriguez faced Miguel Cotto on October 5, 2013, at the Amway Center in Orlando, Florida. Cotto displayed an aggressive style early in the fight and landed powerful body shots. In the beginning of the third round, Cotto landed a left hook to the temple which knocked Rodriguez onto the canvas. The referee then stopped the fight and gave Cotto a third-round TKO victory.

==== Rodríguez vs. Lara ====
Rodríguez was then scheduled to face Cuban southpaw Erislandy Lara in the main event of a Premier Boxing Champions fight card, after coming off of a draw in his last outing against Joachim Alcine over a year earlier on May 16, 2014. He was dominated throughout the bout by Lara, getting knocked down in the sixth round en route to losing via unanimous decision, which was virtually a shutout.

== Professional boxing record ==
29 Wins (14 Knockouts), 9 Losses (2 Knockouts), 4 Draws, 0 No Contests
Res.	Record	Opponent	Type	Rd., Time	Date	Location	Notes
Loss	29-9-4	(United States) Courtney Pennington	UD	10	2017-05-11	(United States) Mohegan Sun Casino, Uncasville, Connecticut	
Win	29-8-4	(United States) Shawn Cameron	UD	10	2016-07-23	(United States) Mohegan Sun Casino, Uncasville, Connecticut	
Loss	28-8-4	(Cuba) Erislandy Lara	UD	12	2015-06-12	(United States) UIC Pavilion, Chicago, Illinois	For WBA (Regular) and vacant IBO Light Middleweight titles.
Draw	28-7-4	(Canada) Joachim Alcine	SD	12	2014-05-16	(Canada) Olympic Stadium, Montreal, Quebec	
Loss	28-7-3	(Puerto Rico) Miguel Cotto	TKO	3 (12), 0:18	2013-10-05	(United States) Amway Center, Orlando, Florida	
Win	28-6-3	(Mexico) Freddy Hernández	TKO	8 (10), 1:37	2013-05-24	(United States) Mohegan Sun Casino, Uncasville, Connecticut	Won vacant IBF North American Light Middleweight title
Win	27-6-3	(United States) George Tahdooahnippah	TKO	6 (10), 2:41	2013-02-15	(United States) Mohegan Sun Casino, Uncasville, Connecticut	
Loss	26-6-3	(United States) Austin Trout	UD	12	2012-06-02	(United States) The Home Depot Center, Carson, California	For WBA Light Middleweight title.
Win	26-5-3	(Poland) Pawel Wolak	UD	12	2011-12-03	(United States) Madison Square Garden, Manhattan, New York	Won vacant IBA Intercontinental Light Middleweight Title
Draw	25-5-3	(Poland) Pawel Wolak	MD	10	2011-07-15	(United States) Roseland Ballroom, Manhattan, New York	
Loss	25-5-2	(United Kingdom) Ashley Theophane	MD	10	2010-07-30	(United States) Buffalo Run Casino, Miami, Oklahoma	
Win	25-4-2	(Greece) Mike Arnaoutis	UD	12	2010-04-02	(United States) Mohegan Sun Casino, Uncasville, Connecticut	Retained USBA Welterweight title.
Loss	24-4-2	(Poland) Rafal Jackiewicz	UD	12	2009-11-27	(Poland) Hala MOSiR, ul. Kolbego 11, os. Baranki, Elk	
Loss	24-3-2	(South Africa) Isaac Hlatshwayo	SD	12	2009-08-01	(United States) Mohegan Sun Casino, Uncasville, Connecticut	For vacant IBF Welterweight title.
Draw	24-2-2	(South Africa) Isaac Hlatshwayo	SD	12	2009-08-01	(South Africa) Emperors Palace, Kempton, Gauteng	
Win	24-2-1	(United States) Oscar Díaz	KO	11 (12), 0:10	2008-07-16	(United States) San Antonio Municipal Auditorium, San Antonio, Texas	Won USBA Welterweight title.
Win	23-2-1	(United States) Troy Browning	UD	10	2008-02-15	(United States) Mohegan Sun Casino, Uncasville, Connecticut	
Win	22-2-1	(United States) Keenan Collins	TKO	2 (12), 3:00	2007-08-24	(United States) Utopia Paradise Theatre, The Bronx, New York	
Loss	21-2-1	(United States) Jesse Feliciano	TKO	8 (12), 2:42	2007-03-23	(United States) Foxwoods Resort Casino, Ledyard, Connecticut	Lost USBA Welterweight title.
Win	21-1-1	(Namibia) Frans Hantindi	TKO	1 (8), 2:59	2006-11-25	(Canada) Palais des Sports Léopold-Drolet, Sherbrooke, Quebec	
Win	20-1-1	(Ecuador) Luis Hernandez	TKO	3 (12), 1:47	2006-05-26	(United States) Cohen Stadium, El Paso, Texas	Won USBA Welterweight title.
Win	19-1-1	(Dominican Republic) Alexis Divison	DQ	4 (10), 0:28	2006-02-17	(United States) FedExForum, Memphis, Tennessee	
Win	18-1-1	(United States) Virgil McClendon	TKO	6 (8), 0:47	2005-11-23	(United States) Westchester County Center, White Plains, New York	
Win	17-1-1	(United States) Luther Smith	KO	1 (8), 2:59	2005-08-05	(United States) Foxwoods Resort Casino, Ledyard, Connecticut	

== Titles in boxing ==
- USBA welterweight champion (2006, 2008)
- IBA Intercontinental light middleweight champion (2011)
- IBF North American light middleweight champion (2013)
