= Jo Jo Dan =

Romanian boxer

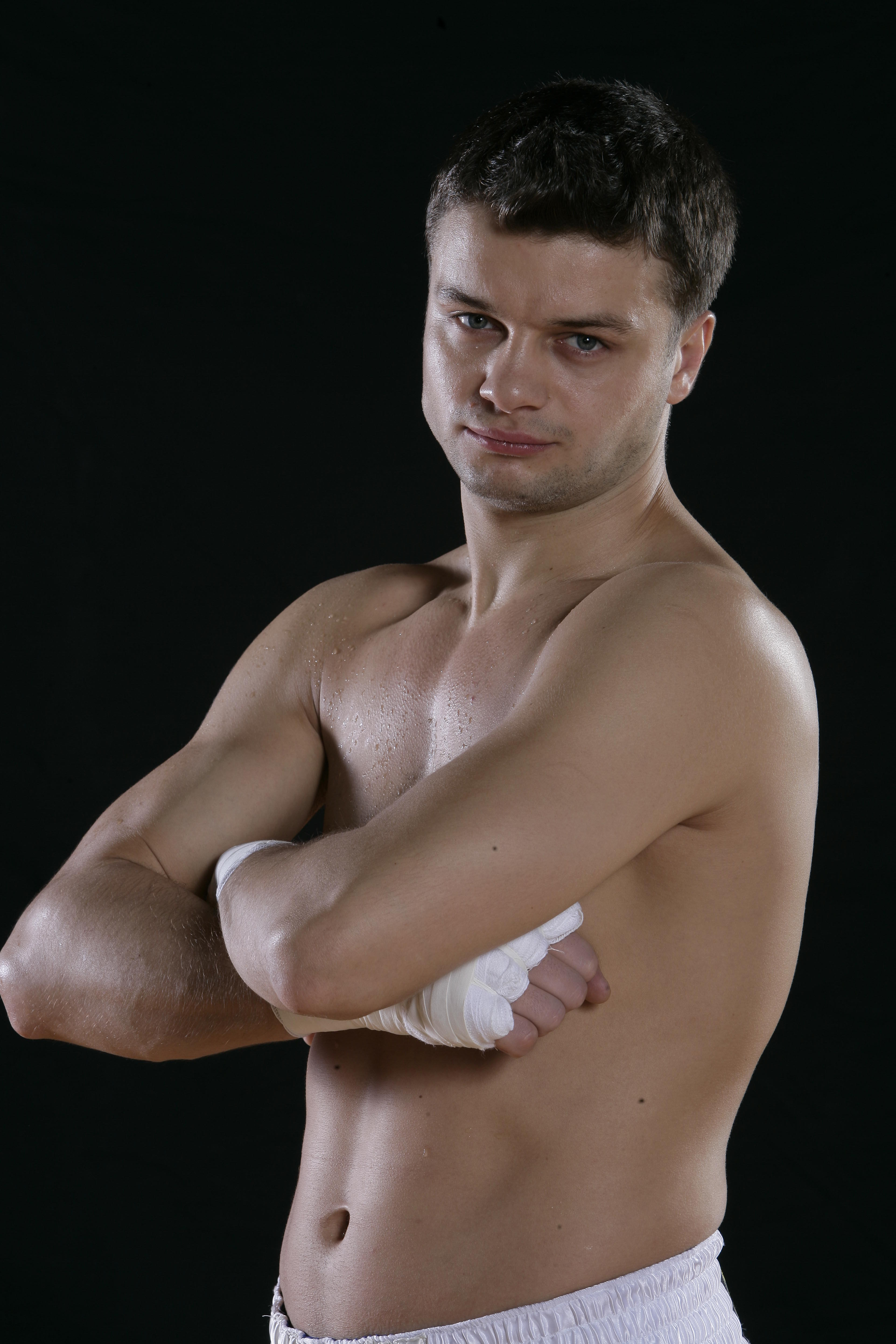
- Dan in 2008

Personal information
- Nationality: Romanian
- Born: Ionuț Dan Ion; 9 August 1981 (age 45) Giurgiu, Romania
- Height: 177 cm (5 ft 10 in)
- Weight: Light welterweight Welterweight; Light middleweight

Boxing career
- Reach: 179 cm (70 in)
- Stance: Southpaw

Boxing record
- Total fights: 41
- Wins: 36
- Win by KO: 19
- Losses: 5
- Draws: 0

Jo Jo Dan (born Ionuț Dan Ion; 9 August 1981) is a Romanian professional boxer and world title challenger. He currently fights out of Montreal, Quebec, Canada.

== Professional boxing career ==
Dan made his professional debut in 2004. On 30 November 2013, he defeated Kevin Bizier by unanimous decision to win the NABA welterweight and IBF Inter-Continental welterweight titles.

== Professional boxing record ==
41 fights, 36 wins (19 knockouts), 5 losses (2 knockouts)
Result	Record	Opponent	Type	Round, time	Date	Location	Notes
Loss	36-5	(United States) Jamal James	UD	10	2017-07-15	(United States) Nassau Coliseum, Uniondale	
Win	36-4	(Mexico) Jesus Gurrola	TKO	5 (8)	2017-03-30	(Canada) Montreal Casino, Montreal	
Loss	35-4	(United States) Jarrett Hurd	TKO	6 (10)	2016-11-12	(United States) Liacouras Center, Philadelphia, Pennsylvania	
Win	35-3	(Poland) Rafal Jackiewicz	UD	8	2015-09-11	(Canada) Ricoh Coliseum Toronto, Ontario	
Loss	34-3	(United Kingdom) Kell Brook	RTD	4 (12)	2015-03-28	(United Kingdom) Motorpoint Arena, Sheffield, Yorkshire	For IBF Welterweight title.
Win	34-2	(Canada) Kevin Bizier	SD	12	2014-12-19	(Canada) Colisée Pepsi, Québec City, Québec	Won IBF Welterweight Title Eliminator.
Win	33-2	(Poland) Łukasz Janik	TKO	5 (8)	2014-05-22	(Canada) Holiday Inn, Pointe-Claire, Québec	
Win	32-2	(Canada) Kevin Bizier	SD	12	2013-11-30	(Canada) Colisée Pepsi, Québec City, Québec	Won NABA welterweight and IBF Inter-Continental welterweight titles.
Win	31-2	(Cuba) Damian Frias	UD	8	2013-04-04	(United States) Roseland Ballroom, New York City, New York	
Win	30-2	(Dominican Republic) Franklin Gonzalez	TKO	5 (8)	2012-12-19	(United States) Roseland Ballroom, New York City, New York	
Loss	29-2	(Turkey) Selçuk Aydın	UD	12	2011-11-26	(Turkey) Spor Salonu, Istanbul	For WBC Silver Welterweight Title.
Win	29-1	(Guyana) Iwan Azore	TKO	3 (10)	2011-07-29	(Trinidad and Tobago) Jean Pierre Sports Complex, Port of Spain	Won vacant WBC Caribbean Boxing Federation (CABOFE) Welterweight Title.
Win	28-1	(United States) Steve Forbes	TD	6 (10)	2011-02-11	(Canada) Bell Centre, Montreal, Québec	
Win	27-1	(Argentina) Andres Pablo Villafane	KO	4 (10)	2010-10-15	(Canada) Bell Centre, Montreal, Québec	
Loss	26-1	(Turkey) Selçuk Aydın	SD	12	2010-06-05	(Turkey) Abdi İpekçi Arena, Istanbul	For vacant WBC Silver Welterweight Title.
Win	26-0	(Brazil) Andre Marcos Nascimento	KO	10 (12)	2010-04-10	(Romania) Sala Rapid, Bucharest	Retained WBC Continental Americas Light Welterweight Title.
Win	25-0	(Argentina) Walter Sergio Gomez	UD	12	2009-05-06	(Romania) Sala Rapid, Bucharest	Retained NABA and WBC Continental Americas Light Welterweight Titles.
Win	24-0	(Mexico) Cesar Soriano	UD	4	2009-03-13	(Canada) Bell Centre, Montreal, Québec	
Win	23-0	(Mexico) Miguel Casillas	KO	11 (12)	2008-12-19	(Romania) Sala Sporturilor Olimpia, Ploieşti	Won vacant WBC Continental Americas Light Welterweight Title.
Win	22-0	(Uganda) Peter Semo	UD	12	2008-08-01	(Romania) Piatra Neamţ	Retained NABA Light Welterweight Title.
Win	21-0	(Argentina) Raul Horacio Balbi	KO	3 (10)	2008-04-19	(Romania) Sala Polivalentă, Bucharest	Retained NABA Light Welterweight Title.
Win	20-0	(Mexico) Jose Leonardo Corona	KO	3 (6)	2008-02-29	(Canada) Bell Centre, Montreal, Québec	
Win	19-0	(United States) Paul Delgado	KO	12	2007-10-19	(Canada) Bell Centre, Montreal, Québec	Won vacant NABA Light Welterweight Title.
Win	18-0	(Argentina) Walter Orlando Acosta	TKO	2 (6)	2007-06-15	(Canada) Bell Centre, Montreal, Québec	
Win	17-0	(Mexico) Ricardo Cano	UD	8	2007-05-09	(Canada) Studio Mel's, Montreal, Québec	
Win	16-0	(Barbados) Christopher Henry	UD	8	2007-01-26	(Canada) Bell Centre, Montreal, Québec	
Win	15-0	(Argentina) Jorge Daniel Miranda	TKO	3 (6)	2006-09-15	(Canada) Bell Centre, Montreal, Québec	
Win	14-0	(Guyana) Shawn Garnett	UD	6	2006-05-16	(Canada) Bell Centre, Montreal, Québec	
Win	13-0	(Mexico) Ulises Jimenez	UD	6	2006-03-24	(Canada) Bell Centre, Montreal, Québec	
Win	12-0	(United States) Darien Ford	UD	6	2005-12-02	(Canada) Bell Centre, Montreal, Québec	
Win	11-0	(Canada) Sebastien Hamel	TKO	4 (6)	2005-09-16	(Canada) Bell Centre, Montreal, Québec	
Win	10-0	(Canada) Amadou Diallo	UD	6	2005-06-03	(Canada) Maurice Richard Arena, Montreal, Québec	
Win	9-0	(Bulgaria) Ivo Golakov	TKO	4 (8)	2005-04-21	(Romania) Siderurgistul Hall, Galaţi	
Win	8-0	(Mexico) Francisco Guillen	TKO	4 (6)	2005-03-18	(Canada) Bell Centre, Montreal, Québec	
Win	7-0	(United States) Terry Lantz	TKO	5 (6)	2005-02-10	(Canada) Pavillon de la Jeunesse, Quebec City, Québec	
Win	6-0	(United States) Joshua Smith	TKO	3 (6)	2004-12-11	(Canada) Montreal Casino, Montreal, Québec	
Win	5-0	(Canada) Bakary Sako	TKO	2 (4)	2004-12-03	(Canada) Bell Centre, Montreal, Québec	
Win	4-0	(Canada) Bakary Sako	UD	4	2004-11-03	(Canada) Club Soda, Montreal, Québec	
Win	3-0	(Canada) Amadou Diallo	UD	4	2004-09-29	(Canada) Club Soda, Montreal, Québec	
Win	2-0	(Canada) Darren Kenny	UD	4	2004-09-09	(Canada) Fort Garry Place, Winnipeg, Manitoba	
Win	1-0	(Canada) Jeff Hill	TKO	2 (4)	2004-04-21	(Canada) Royal York Hotel, Toronto, Ontario	
