= Sugar Jackson =

Belgian boxer

Personal information
- Nickname: Sugar
- Nationality: Belgian
- Born: Jackson Osei Bonsu; 3 March 1981 (age 45) Tamale, Ghana
- Weight: Welterweight

Boxing career

Boxing record
- Total fights: 51
- Wins: 43
- Win by KO: 29
- Losses: 7
- Draws: 1

(Sugar) Jackson Osei Bonsu (born 3 March 1981, in Ghana) is a Belgian welterweight professional boxer of Ghanaian descent. He started to call himself Sugar as a reference to Sugar Ray Robinson. Jackson has, in recent times, gained a large following in the UK and US, and in early 2008 was voted the 'Official Overseas Fighter' of internet boxing forum Boxing Rebels, replacing the charismatic Bobby Gunn.

In 1997, Jackson came to Belgium, where his father was already living. As boxing was his boyhood dream, he started to attend the Antwerpse Boksschool (English: Antwerp Boxing School). Currently, Jackson trains in Izegem.

Sugar Jackson is famous for his punching and his perseverance. His defence techniques are considered his weaker point. So far, Jackson has won 40 (28 knockouts) of his 45 fights. In February 2005, he won the IBC world title. In February 2007, almost exactly two years after his IBC title, Jackson defeated Nordin Mouchi, capturing the EBU European title. He successfully defended his EBU title 4 times. The last time was on 3 May 2008 against the Ukrainian Viktor Plotnikov.

On 14 September 2008 Jackson lost his EBU Welterweight title in a greatly disputed unanimous decision against Rafał Jackiewicz. Although all three judges scored the fight in favour of Jackiewicz, there was great controversy as many experts believed Sugar Jackson won at least 10 of the 12 rounds. Belgian newspaper De Standaard called the result 'the theft of the century'.

== Boxing record ==
39 Wins (28 (T)KO's, 9 decisions), 5 Losses
Date	Result	Opponent	Method	Rounds
25 December 2011	Win	(Georgia (country)) Malkhaz Berkatsashvili	KO	1/?
4 March 2011	Win	(Spain) Jose Del Rio	UD	10/10
25 December 2010	Win	(Brazil) Luiz Augusto Dos Santos	DQ	2/8
11 November 2010	Win	(Brazil) Andre Marcos Nascimento	KO	3/10
19 March 2010	Loss	(United States) Randall Bailey	TKO	1/12
11 November 2009	Win	(Luxembourg) Nascimento Monteiro	KO	2/12
7 November 2009	Loss	(Turkey) Selcuk Aydin	KO	9/12
20 December 2008	Win	(Argentina) Carlos Manuel Baldomir	Decision	12/12
13 October 2008	Win	(Romania) Gheorghe Danut	Decision	6/6
14 September 2008	Loss	(Poland) Rafał Jackiewicz	Decision	12/12
5 March 2008	Win	(Ukraine) Viktor Plotnikov	Decision	12/12
12 January 2008	Win	(France) Brice Faradji	Decision	12/12
27 October 2007	Win	(France) Nordine Mouchi	KO	3/12
9 June 2007	Win	(Italy) Cristian De Martinis	KO	12/12
25 February 2007	Win	(France) Nordine Mouchi	KO	8/12
1 November 2006	Win	(Romania) Vasile Surcica	Decision	8/8
6 October 2006	Win	(United Kingdom) Kevin Phelan	TKO	4/6
11 February 2006	Win	(Belgium) Zaid Bediouri	TKO	1/6
1 November 2005	Win	(Netherlands) Abder Bchiri	TKO	6/8
11 June 2005	Win	(Hungary) Janos Petrovics	TKO	4/12
11 February 2005	Win	(Russia) Mikhail Krivolapov	KO	5/12
1 November 2004	Win	(France) Fabrice Colombel	KO	8/10
5 June 2004	Win	(Russia) Maxim Nesterenko	TKO	8/10
24 January 2004	Win	(Netherlands) Regillo Aaron	KO	1/8
25 December 2003	Win	(France) Fabrice Colombel	TKO	10/10
1 November 2003	Win	(France) David Sarraille	TKO	2/10
7 June 2003	Win	(Cameroon) Hamza Issa	TKO	2/6
10 May 2003	Win	(Poland) Adam Zadworny	TKO	3/6
21 April 2003	Win	(France) Jean Gomis II	KO	2/6
14 March 2003	Win	(Luxembourg) Kamel Ikene	KO	2/6
15 February 2003	Win	(Tunisia) Riadh Rekhis	KO	1/6
25 December 2002	Loss	(France) Abdel Mehidi	TKO	10/10
22 November 2002	Win	(Luxembourg) Calvin Silatcha	Decision	6/6
1 November 2002	Win	(France) Kwassi Acclombesi	TKO	3/6
20 May 2002	Win	(Netherlands) Yassine El Maachi	TKO	3/6
2 April 2002	Win	(France) Belaid Yahiaoui	Decision	8/8
25 December 2001	Win	(Egypt) Ahmed Aoud	TKO	2/6
1 November 2001	Win	(France) Laurent Roussel	TKO	3/6
27 October 2001	Win	(Belgium) Dominique Van der Steene	KO	1/6

== See also ==
- Expeditie Robinson 2010
