= Kevin Bizier =

Canadian boxer (born 1984)

Personal information
- Born: August 12, 1984 (age 42) Saint-Émile, Quebec City, Quebec, Canada
- Height: 5 ft 9 in (175 cm)
- Weight: Welterweight

Boxing career
- Reach: 71 in (180 cm)
- Stance: Orthodox

Boxing record
- Total fights: 28
- Wins: 25
- Win by KO: 17
- Losses: 3

Kevin Bizier (born 12 August 1984) is a Canadian professional boxer who has challenged once for the IBF welterweight title, in 2016.

== Amateur career ==
His amateur performance allowed him to become the Fighting pride of Quebec City. Bizier was 7-time Canadian champion during his amateur career. He also represented Canada on the world stage as a member of the national team. He has participated in several tournaments 2007 world championships in Chicago, the 2006 Commonwealth Games in Australia and the 2005 world championship in Mianyang. In the amateur he participated in a total of 124 fights with 98 wins.

His greatest achievement among amateurs is a victory over the gold medalist of the 2008 Summer Olympics, the Dominican Felix Diaz, during the tournament Copa Romana, Dominican Republic in 2006. Among the high-level boxers he faced include Breidis Prescott, Serik Sapiyev and Marcos Maidana.

== Professional career ==
Bizier happened professionally in 2008 with Groupe Yvon Michel (GYM) of Montreal, Quebec. In his twentieth fight Bizier defeated former world champion Nate Campbell, so to get hold of his IBF Inter-Continental welterweight Champion. In addition, having been champion NABA Welterweight from 2011 to 2013.

=== Bizier vs. Dan ===
The first fight between Bizier and Jo Jo Dan was a war in which both boxers was completely exhausted after the 8th round. At the end of the battle, the judges issued a controversial split decision in favor of Dan.

=== Bizier vs. Dan 2 ===
In October 2014, the IBF ordered an eliminator rematch to become mandatory challenger for the welterweight world title held by Kell Brook.

== Professional boxing record ==
25 wins (16 knockouts), 3 losses, 0 draws, 0 no contests
| Res. | Record | Opponent | Type | Round | Date | Location | Notes |
| Loss | 25-3 | (United Kingdom) Kell Brook | TKO | 2 (12) | 2016-03-26 | (United Kingdom) Sheffield Arena, Sheffield, England | For IBF welterweight title. |
| Win | 25-2 | (Ghana) Fredrick Lawson | RTD | 10 (12) | 2015-11-07 | (United States) Miccosukee Indian Gaming Resort, Miami, Florida, U.S. | |
| Win | 24-2 | (France) Fouad El Massoudi | MD | 8 | 2015-04-04 | Colisée Pepsi, Quebec City, Quebec, Canada | |
| Loss | 23-2 | (Romania) Jo Jo Dan | SD | 12 | 2014-12-19 | Colisée Pepsi, Quebec City, Quebec, Canada | |
| Win | 23-1 | (Hungary) Laszlo Fazekas | TKO | 1 (8) | 2014-09-27 | Bell Centre, Montreal, Quebec, Canada | |
| Win | 22-1 | (Argentina) Carlos Leonardo Herrera | TKO | 2 (8) | 2014-05-24 | Bell Centre, Montreal, Quebec, Canada | |
| Loss | 21-1 | (Romania) Jo Jo Dan | SD | 12 | 2013-11-30 | Colisée Pepsi, Quebec City, Quebec, Canada | Lost IBF Inter-Continental and NABA welterweight titles. |
| Win | 21-0 | (Italy) Giuseppe Lauri | UD | 6 | 2013-09-28 | Bell Centre, Montreal, Quebec, Canada | |
| Win | 20-0 | (United States) Nate Campbell | RTD | 8 (12) | 2013-02-08 | Bell Centre, Montreal, Quebec, Canada | Won vacant IBF Inter-Continental and NABA welterweight titles. |
| Win | 19-0 | (United States) Doel Carrasquillo | UD | 8 | 2012-12-14 | Bell Centre, Montreal, Quebec, Canada | |
| Win | 18-0 | (Poland) Patryk Litkiewicz | KO | 1 (6) | 2012-10-12 | Bell Centre, Montreal, Quebec, Canada | |
| Win | 17-0 | (United States) Lanardo Tyner | UD | 12 | 2011-12-17 | Colisée Pepsi, Quebec City, Quebec, Canada | Won vacant NABA welterweight title. |
| Win | 16-0 | (Denmark) Christian Bladt | KO | 3 (8) | 2011-11-05 | Colisée Pepsi, Quebec City, Quebec, Canada | |
| Win | 15-0 | (Mexico) Mauro Lucero | KO | 5 (8) | 2011-05-21 | Bell Centre, Montreal, Quebec, Canada | |
| Win | 14-0 | (United States) Edgar Ruiz | KO | 1 (8) | 2011-02-11 | Bell Centre, Montreal, Quebec, Canada | |
| Win | 13-0 | (United States) Ronnie Warrior Jr | RTD | 3 (8) | 2010-12-18 | Colisée Pepsi, Quebec City, Quebec, Canada | |
| Win | 12-0 | (Canada) Leonardo Rojas | RTD | 3 (8) | 2010-08-28 | Metropolis, Montreal, Quebec, Canada | |
| Win | 11-0 | (Mexico) Jhonny Navarrete | RTD | 7 (8) | 2010-06-11 | Uniprix Stadium, Montreal, Quebec, Canada | |
| Win | 10-0 | (Puerto Rico) Wilfredo Negron | UD | 8 | 2010-04-03 | Montreal Casino, Montreal, Quebec, Canada | |
| Win | 9-0 | (Mexico) Noel Cortez | KO | 1 (8) | 2010-03-06 | Montreal Casino, Montreal, Quebec, Canada | |
| Win | 8-0 | (Canada) Michael Springer | KO | 1 (6) | 2010-02-06 | Montreal Casino, Montreal, Quebec, Canada | |
| Win | 7-0 | (United States) Patrick Cape | TKO | 1 (6) | 2009-11-28 | Colisée Pepsi, Quebec City, Quebec, Canada | |
| Win | 6-0 | (Mexico) Jose Leonardo Corona | UD | 6 | 2009-09-25 | Bell Centre, Montreal, Quebec, Canada | |
| Win | 5-0 | (Mexico) Cesar Soriano | UD | 4 | 2009-06-19 | Bell Centre, Montreal, Quebec, Canada | |
| Win | 4-0 | (Mexico) Ulises Duarte | KO | 1 (4) | 2009-04-18 | Montreal Casino, Montreal, Quebec, Canada | |
| Win | 3-0 | (United States) Travis Hartman | KO | 2 (4) | 2008-11-29 | Montreal Casino, Montreal, Quebec, Canada | |
| Win | 2-0 | (Mexico) Cesar Figueroa | UD | 4 | 2008-11-01 | Montreal Casino, Montreal, Quebec, Canada | |
| Win | 1-0 | (United States) Jason McClure | TKO | 1 (4) | 2008-10-04 | Montreal Casino, Montreal, Quebec, Canada | |
