= Isaac Hlatshwayo =

South African boxer

Personal information
- Nickname: The Angel
- Nationality: South African
- Born: 4 October 1977 (age 48) Malamulele, Limpopo, South Africa
- Height: 1.73 m (5 ft 8 in)
- Weight: Lightweight; Light welterweight; Welterweight

Boxing career
- Reach: 180 cm (71 in)
- Stance: Orthodox

Boxing record
- Total fights: 38
- Wins: 30
- Win by KO: 10
- Losses: 6
- Draws: 1
- No contests: 1

Isaac Hlatshwayo (born 4 October 1977) is a South African former professional boxer who competed from 2000 to 2013. He held the IBF welterweight title in 2009, and the IBO lightweight and welterweight titles between 2005 and 2008.

== Professional career ==
Hlatshwayo won the vacant IBF welterweight title against Delvin Rodríguez from the Dominican Republic on 1 August 2009. He lost the title to Jan Zaveck on 11 December 2009.

== Professional boxing record ==
38 fights	30 wins	6 losses
By knockout	10	3
By decision	20	3
Draws	1	
No contests	1	

No.	Result	Record	Opponent	Type	Round, time	Date	Location	Notes
38	Loss	30–6–1 (1)	Kaizer Mabuza	UD	8	2 Mar 2013	Sandton Convention Center, Johannesburg, South Africa	
37	Loss	30–5–1 (1)	Bethuel Ushona	UD	12	28 Jul 2012	Ramatex Factory, Windhoek, Namibia	
36	Loss	30–4–1 (1)	Bongo Lipembo	KO	2 (8)	26 Mar 2012	Emperors Palace, Kempton Park, South Africa	
35	Loss	30–3–1 (1)	Naoufel Ben Rabah	KO	3 (12), 2:59	20 Jul 2011	Entertainment Centre, Sydney, Australia	For vacant IBF Australasian welterweight title
34	Win	30–2–1 (1)	Nkululeko Mhlongo	PTS	8	30 Oct 2010	University Hall, Mafikeng, South Africa	
33	Loss	29–2–1 (1)	Jan Zaveck	TKO	3 (12), 2:55	11 Dec 2009	Wembley Indoor Arena, Johannesburg, South Africa	Lost IBF welterweight title
32	Win	29–1–1 (1)	Delvin Rodríguez	SD	12	1 Aug 2009	Mohegan Sun Casino, Montville, Connecticut, US	Won vacant IBF welterweight title
31	Draw	28–1–1 (1)	Delvin Rodríguez	SD	12	17 Nov 2008	Emperors Palace, Kempton Park, South Africa	
30	Win	28–1 (1)	Robert Medley	TKO	10 (12), 1:49	4 Apr 2008	Croatian Club, Sydney, Australia	Retained IBO welterweight title
29	Win	27–1 (1)	Robert Medley	UD	12	12 Oct 2007	Panthers Rugby League Club, Penrith, Australia	Retained IBO welterweight title
28	Win	26–1 (1)	Joseph Makaringe	UD	12	12 May 2007	Emperors Palace, Kempton Park, South Africa	Won vacant IBO welterweight title
27	Loss	25–1 (1)	Kendall Holt	UD	12	3 Nov 2006	Ballys Park Place Hotel Casino, Atlantic City, New Jersey, US	For vacant WBO–NABO junior-welterweight title
26	Win	25–0 (1)	Jeremy Yelton	UD	8	17 Jun 2006	FedExForum, Memphis, Tennessee, US	
25	Win	24–0 (1)	Nate Campbell	SD	12	7 Apr 2006	Florida State Fairgrounds, Tampa, Florida, US	Retained IBO lightweight title
24	Win	23–0 (1)	Aldo Nazareno Rios	UD	12	25 Feb 2006	Carnival City, Brakpan, South Africa	Retained IBO lightweight title
23	Win	22–0 (1)	Cassius Baloyi	UD	12	31 Aug 2005	Carnival City, Brakpan, South Africa	Won vacant IBO lightweight title
22	Win	21–0 (1)	William Morelo	UD	10	13 May 2005	Plaza Hotel & Casino, Las Vegas, Nevada, US	
21	NC	20–0 (1)	Marty Robbins	NC	1 (8), 3:00	4 Feb 2005	Foxwoods Resort Casino, Ledyard, Connecticut, US	NC after Robbins cut from accidental head clash
20	Win	20–0	Phillip Ndou	SD	12	22 May 2004	Carnival City Casino, Brakpan, South Africa	Retained South African lightweight title
19	Win	19–0	Patrick Malinga	RTD	7 (12), 3:00	24 Apr 2004	Superbowl, Sun City, South Africa	Retained South African lightweight title
18	Win	18–0	Samuel Malinga	UD	8	7 Feb 2004	Carnival City Casino, Brakpan, South Africa	
17	Win	17–0	Irvin Buhlalu	KO	6 (12)	19 Dec 2003	Wembley Indoor Arena, Johannesburg, South Africa	Retained South African lightweight title
16	Win	16–0	Benedict Dlamini	KO	9 (12)	11 Oct 2003	Oasis Motel, Polokwane, South Africa	Retained South African lightweight title
15	Win	15–0	Lucky Lewele	SD	10	31 May 2003	Carnival City, Brakpan, South Africa	
14	Win	14–0	Kaizer Mabuza	UD	12	18 Feb 2003	Carousel Casino, Hammanskraal, South Africa	Retained South African lightweight title
13	Win	13–0	Martin Jacobs	UD	12	5 Oct 2002	Wembley Indoor Arena, Johannesburg, South Africa	Won South African lightweight title
12	Win	12–0	Mzwanele Sam	PTS	6	8 May 2002	Wembley Indoor Arena, Johannesburg, South Africa	
11	Win	11–0	Nkosinathi Moholo	UD	8	28 Nov 2001	Wembley Indoor Arena, Johannesburg, South Africa	
10	Win	10–0	James Sibanda	KO	4 (6)	19 Sep 2001	Ubuntu Kraal Resort, Johannesburg, South Africa	
9	Win	9–0	Bheki Lubisi	TKO	2 (6)	26 Aug 2001	Westgate Shopping Mall, Roodepoort, South Africa	
8	Win	8–0	Hugo Manqina	KO	2 (6)	11 Apr 2001	Carnival City, Brakpan, South Africa	
7	Win	7–0	Mpho Mothiba	TKO	4 (6)	7 Mar 2001	Carousel Casino, Hammanskraal, South Africa	
6	Win	6–0	McNicolas Kagiri	TD	5 (6)	24 Jan 2001	Carousel Casino, Hammanskraal, South Africa	
5	Win	5–0	Soloman Maake	TKO	3 (6)	26 Nov 2000	Pintoburg Clubhouse, Pietersburg, South Africa	
4	Win	4–0	Thomas Pisane	PTS	4	29 Jul 2000	Maraisburg Town Hall, Johannesburg, South Africa	
3	Win	3–0	Samuel Malinga	PTS	4	24 Jun 2000	Civic Hall, Johannesburg, South Africa	
2	Win	2–0	Sello Moalusi	PTS	4	20 May 2000	Meadowlands Hall, Johannesburg, South Africa	
1	Win	1–0	Kaizer Mabuza	TKO	1 (6)	15 Feb 2000	NKP Teachers Training College, Pretoria, South Africa	

Sporting positions
Regional boxing titles
Preceded by Martin Jacobs	South African lightweight champion 5 Oct 2002 – Dec 2004; Vacated	Vacant Title next held by Sikhulule Sidzumo
Minor world boxing titles
Vacant Title last held by Aldo Nazareno Rios	IBO lightweight champion 31 Aug 2005 – Aug 2006; Vacated	Vacant Title next held by Juan Díaz
Vacant Title last held by Floyd Mayweather Jr.	IBO welterweight champion 12 May 2007 – Sep 2008; Vacated	Vacant Title next held by Lovemore N'dou
Major world boxing titles
Vacant Title last held by Joshua Clottey	IBF welterweight champion 1 Aug 2009 – 11 Dec 2009	Succeeded by Jan Zaveck
