= Selçuk Aydın =

Turkish boxer (born 1983)

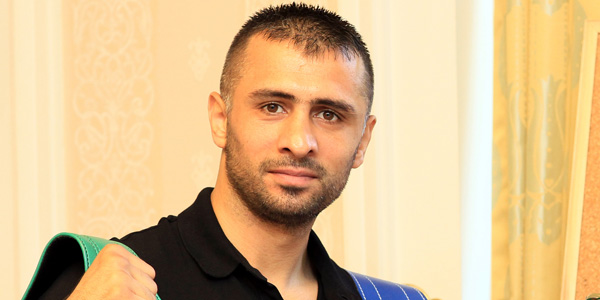
- Aydın in 2011

Personal information
- Nicknames: Mini Tyson; Turkish Warrior
- Nationality: Turkish
- Born: 4 September 1983 (age 42) Trabzon, Turkey
- Height: 1.70 m (5 ft 7 in)
- Weight: Light-welterweight; Welterweight

Boxing career
- Reach: 165 cm (65 in)

Boxing record
- Total fights: 32
- Wins: 29
- Win by KO: 22
- Losses: 3
Medal record
Men's amateur boxing
Representing Turkey
European Championships
| Silver medal – second place | 2004 Pula | Lightweight |
| Bronze medal – third place | 2002 Perm | Lightweight |
EU Championships
| Gold medal – first place | 2003 Strasbourg | Lightweight |
| Silver medal – second place | 2004 Madrid | Lightweight |
| Silver medal – second place | 2006 Pécs | Lightweight |
Mediterranean Games
| Silver medal – second place | 2005 Almeíra | Lightweight |

Selçuk Aydın (born 4 September 1983) is a Turkish professional boxer. He held the European welterweight title from 2009 to 2010, the WBC Silver welterweight title from 2010 to 2012, and has challenged once for the WBC interim welterweight title in 2012. As an amateur he won several medals at the European and European Union Championships, all in the lightweight division.

== Amateur career ==
As an amateur he fought as a teenager at bantamweight where he won the European U17 title in 1999 and as a senior in the lightweight (60 kg) category where he won the European junior title in 2001. At senior level he won bronze in 2002 and a silver medal at the 2004 European Amateur Boxing Championships in Pula, Croatia where he lost to Dimitar Shtilianov. 2003 at the world championships he lost his second fight against Thai Pichai Sayotha.

Aydın won the 2004 World University Boxing Championships and also participated at the 2004 Summer Olympics in Athens, Greece but was eliminated in the first round by Shtilianov.

He was more successful at the 2005 Mediterranean Games in Almería, Spain and won the silver medal, at the World Championships 2005 he lost his third bout to Jong Sub-Baik. The short-tempered Aydin was suspended for several years after hitting a referee and turned pro.

== Professional career ==
Selcuk Aydin's professional debut was against Marian Gabris and knocked him out in the 1st round with 1 minute 31 seconds in. He then fought various other fighters. His first major fight for a title was against Lucky Lewele for the vacant WBC International welterweight title. He defeated him with a unanimous decision to gain the title. He then defended his title against Marat Khuzeev, Luis Hernandez, Said Ouali and Jackson Osei Bonsu. On June 5, 2010 Selcuk had a bout with Jo Jo Dan for the vacant WBC Silver welterweight title. He defeated Jo Jo Dan with a controversial split decision to win and nab himself the WBC Silver welterweight title. He would then go onto defeat Jo Jo Dan again via controversial decision in a re-match over a year later on November 26, 2011.

=== Selcuk Aydin vs. Robert Guerrero ===
On 28 July 2012 Selcuk Aydin faced Robert Guerrero for the interim WBC Welterweight Title. It was by far Selcuk's most important fight in his career at this point. Robert Guerrero was shown as a clear favourite for this fight. The fight lasted the full 12 rounds and Robert Guerrero won with a unanimous decision with the referee's scoring it 117-111, 116-112, 116-112. After the fight Selcuk Aydin was interviewed and said he had been ripped off by not being given this chance when he was first declared the mandatory contender to fight for the belt and said since then he has lost his will and energy.

=== Selcuk Aydin vs. Jesus Soto Karass ===
After suffering the first loss of his career against Robert Guerrero, Aydin returned to the ring for a 10-round fight with Jesus Soto Karass on January 26, 2013. The fight went the distance, where Soto Karass was awarded a majority decision victory.

=== Selcuk Aydin vs. DeMarcus Corley ===
Following an eighth-round KO victory over Aaron Herrera two months earlier, Aydin then went on to face DeMarcus Corley on September 27, 2013. Aydin won by TKO in the fifth round when Corley was unable to continue and decided to quit in the process.

=== Postol vs. Aydin ===
Aydin fought against Ukrainian undefeated boxer Postol for title elimination in U.S and lost this match by KO in round 11.

=== Ring return ===
In the fifth round, Selcuk Aydin won by TKO against Nodar Robakidze.

== Professional boxing record ==
| 32 fights | 29 wins | 3 losses |
|---|---|---|
| By knockout | 22 | 1 |
| By decision | 7 | 2 |

| No. | Result | Record | Opponent | Type | Round, time | Date | Location | Notes |
|---|---|---|---|---|---|---|---|---|
| 32 | Win | 29–3 | (Bosnia and Herzegovina) Adnan Zilic | TKO | 1 (8), 0:23 | 27 Feb 2016 | Stadthalle, Offenbach, Germany | |
| 31 | Win | 28–3 | (Georgia (country)) Nodar Robakidze | RTD | 5 (8), 3:00 | 18 Dec 2015 | Ahi Event Location, Ratingen, Germany | |
| 30 | Win | 27–3 | (Serbia) Misa Nikolic | KO | 1 (8), 2:23 | 11 Apr 2015 | Schützen- und Bürgerhaus, Hövelhof, Germany | |
| 29 | Loss | 26–3 | (Ukraine) Viktor Postol | KO | 11 (12), 2:52 | 17 May 2014 | The Forum, Inglewood, California, US | |
| 28 | Win | 26–2 | (United States) DeMarcus Corley | RTD | 4 (12), 3:00 | 27 Sep 2013 | Tekirdağ Atatürk Spor Kompleksi, Istanbul, Turkey | Won vacant WBC Mediterranean light-welterweight title |
| 27 | Win | 25–2 | (Mexico) Aaron Herrera | KO | 8 (10), 2:29 | 27 Jul 2013 | Kugelbake-Halle, Cuxhaven, Germany | |
| 26 | Win | 24–2 | (Italy) Giuseppe Lauri | UD | 10 | 22 Mar 2013 | Universal Hall, Berlin, Germany | Won vacant PABA interim light-welterweight title |
| 25 | Loss | 23–2 | (Mexico) Jesus Soto Karass | MD | 10 | 26 Jan 2013 | The Joint, Paradise, Nevada, US | |
| 24 | Loss | 23–1 | (United States) Robert Guerrero | UD | 12 | 28 Jul 2012 | HP Pavilion, San Jose, California, US | For vacant WBC interim welterweight title |
| 23 | Win | 23–0 | (Romania) Jo Jo Dan | UD | 12 | 26 Nov 2011 | Spor Salonu, Trabzon, Turkey | Retained WBC Silver welterweight title |
| 22 | Win | 22–0 | (Belarus) Roman Dekhkanov | KO | 5 (12), 1:39 | 15 Jul 2011 | EWS Arena, Göppingen, Germany | |
| 21 | Win | 21–0 | (Belarus) Dzmitry Lubachkin | KO | 1 (12), 2:49 | 1 Apr 2011 | Pferdesportpark, Berlin, Germany | |
| 20 | Win | 20–0 | (Romania) Jo Jo Dan | SD | 12 | 5 Jun 2010 | Abdi İpekçi Arena, Istanbul, Turkey | Won vacant WBC Silver welterweight title |
| 19 | Win | 19–0 | (Belgium) Jackson Osei Bonsu | KO | 9 (12), 1:43 | 11 Jul 2009 | BJK Akatlar Arena, Istanbul, Turkey | Retained WBC International welterweight title; Won European welterweight title |
| 18 | Win | 18–0 | (Morocco) Said Ouali | SD | 12 | 17 Apr 2009 | Star of the Desert Arena, Primm, Nevada, US | Retained WBC International welterweight title |
| 17 | Win | 17–0 | (Ecuador) Luis Hernandez | TKO | 1 (12), 2:32 | 6 Mar 2009 | Kugelbake-Halle, Cuxhaven, Germany | Retained WBC International welterweight title |
| 16 | Win | 16–0 | (Russia) Marat Khuzeev | KO | 2 (12), 0:32 | 12 Sep 2008 | Kugelbake-Halle, Cuxhaven, Germany | Retained WBC International welterweight title |
| 15 | Win | 15–0 | (South Africa) Lucky Lewele | UD | 12 | 26 Apr 2008 | Spor Salonu, Trabzon, Turkey | Won vacant WBC International welterweight title |
| 14 | Win | 14–0 | (Uzbekistan) Farhad Bakirov | UD | 8 | 15 Feb 2008 | Zenith, Munich, Germany | |
| 13 | Win | 13–0 | (Estonia) Leonti Vorontsuk | KO | 2 (6) | 15 Feb 2008 | Istanbul, Turkey | |
| 12 | Win | 12–0 | (Latvia) Jurijs Boreiko | TKO | 2 (8), 1:03 | 23 Dec 2007 | Maritim Hotel, Halle, Germany | |
| 11 | Win | 11–0 | (Belarus) Aliaksandr Shnip | TKO | 1 (8) | 23 Nov 2007 | Palacio de los Deportes, Andoain, Spain | |
| 10 | Win | 10–0 | (Russia) Sergey Starkov | TKO | 6 (8) | 21 Sep 2007 | Hansehalle, Lübeck, Germany | |
| 9 | Win | 9–0 | (Ukraine) Yuri Tsybenko | KO | 2 (8), 3:00 | 16 Jun 2007 | Atatürk Sport Hall, Ankara, Turkey | |
| 8 | Win | 8–0 | (Slovakia) Rastislav Kovac | TKO | 3 (8), 0:58 | 27 Apr 2007 | Arena Gym, Hamburg, Germany | |
| 7 | Win | 7–0 | (Argentina) Diego Martin Alzugaray | KO | 2 (8), 1:29 | 24 Mar 2007 | Alsterdorfer Sporthalle, Hamburg, Germany | |
| 6 | Win | 6–0 | (Belarus) Vitali Martynau | KO | 1 (6), 1:01 | 9 Mar 2007 | Arena Gym, Hamburg, Germany | |
| 5 | Win | 5–0 | (Latvia) Sergejs Savrinovics | UD | 6 | 10 Feb 2007 | Grand Elysée Hotel, Hamburg, Germany | |
| 4 | Win | 4–0 | (Latvia) Deniss Aleksejevs | TKO | 2 (4), 2:27 | 27 Jan 2007 | Burg-Wächter Castello, Düsseldorf, Germany | |
| 3 | Win | 3–0 | (Uzbekistan) Jonny Ibramov | TKO | 2 (4), 0:48 | 15 Dec 2006 | Alsterdorfer Sporthalle, Hamburg, Germany | |
| 2 | Win | 2–0 | (Romania) Marius Bugheata | KO | 1 (4), 2:22 | 2 Dec 2006 | Rhein-Mosel-Halle, Koblenz, Germany | |
| 1 | Win | 1–0 | (Slovakia) Marian Gabris | TKO | 1 (4), 1:31 | 10 Nov 2006 | Alsterdorfer Sporthalle, Hamburg, Germany | |

Sporting positions
Regional boxing titles
| Vacant Title last held by Bongani Mwelase | WBC International welterweight champion 26 April 2008 – 2010; Vacated | Vacant Title next held by Érik Morales |
| Preceded by Rafal Jackiewicz | European welterweight champion 11 July 2009 – 2010; Vacated | Vacant Title next held by Matthew Hatton |
| New title | WBC Silver welterweight champion 5 June 2010 – July 2012; Lost bid for interim world title | Vacant Title next held by Josesito López |
| Vacant Title last held by Stevie Ongen Ferdinandus | PABA light-welterweight champion Interim title 22 March 2013 – September 2013; Vacated | Vacant Title next held by Czar Amonsot |
| Vacant Title last held by Ali Oubaali | WBC Mediterranean light-welterweight champion 27 September 2013 – May 2014; Vacated | Vacant Title next held by Nicolas Gonzalez |
