= Joshua Clottey =

Ghanaian boxer (born 1977)

Personal information
- Nickname: The Grand Master
- Born: October 6, 1977 (age 49) Accra, Ghana
- Height: 5 ft 8 in (173 cm)
- Weight: Light welterweight; Welterweight; Light middleweight

Boxing career
- Reach: 70 in (178 cm)
- Stance: Orthodox

Boxing record
- Total fights: 47
- Wins: 41
- Win by KO: 24
- Losses: 5
- No contests: 1

Joshua Clottey (born October 6, 1977) is a Ghanaian former professional boxer who competed from 1995 to 2019, and held the IBF welterweight title from 2008 to 2009. As an amateur, he competed at the 1994 Commonwealth Games. At the peak of his career, he was notable for his exceptionally durable chin, and was never stopped in any of his five losses.

== Early life ==
As a child in his native Ghana, Clottey had a passion for football, a sport that was also played by his father. Clottey moved and spent a few years in the United Kingdom then later to the United States.

== Professional career ==
=== Welterweight ===
Clottey rose to prominence by winning his first twenty fights, including 14 by knockout. His performance set him up to fight Carlos Baldomir, in a title defense by Baldomir for the WBC international welterweight title. Clottey was winning until the 10th round, where he was penalized two points for an intentional head butt. After another clash of heads, Clottey was disqualified.

Clottey rebounded from the controversial loss by winning the African Boxing Union welterweight title in his next fight. He then rolled off a 10 fight winning streak highlighted by his first win on American soil and capture of several minor welterweight and middleweight titles. The streak culminated in an IBF intercontinental welterweight title. On December 2, 2006, Clottey earned his first shot at a world title but broke his hand in the fourth round of his fight against World Boxing Organization champion Antonio Margarito. That bout against Margarito has since come under controversial suspicion following news reports (released after Margarito's fight with Shane Mosley) that Margarito had boxed opponents with hand wraps illegally loaded with plaster (along with Margarito's first bout with Miguel Cotto). On April 7, 2007 (following Clottey's questionable loss to Margarito), Clottey earned a unanimous decision over Diego Corrales, in what was Corrales's final fight before his death. In December 2007, Clottey positioned himself for another title shot with a win over prospect Shamone Alvarez. Clottey beat Zab Judah on August 2, 2008, for the IBF welterweight title vacated by Antonio Margarito.

==== Clottey vs. Cotto ====
On June 13, 2009, Clottey faced Miguel Cotto in New York City at Madison Square Garden for the WBO welterweight title. Cotto dropped Clottey in the first with a jab. Cotto was cut in the third round by an accidental head butt. Clottey's combinations throughout the fight gave Cotto problems. Cotto emerged the winner with a controversial split decision.

==== Clottey vs. Pacquiao: The Event ====
Clottey fought seven-division world champion Manny Pacquiao on March 13, 2010, in Arlington, Texas, at the Dallas Cowboys Stadium following the disagreement on terms of a proposed boxing match between Manny Pacquiao and Floyd Mayweather Jr. which would have been scheduled on the same date in Las Vegas, Nevada. Clottey lost to Pacquiao by unanimous decision. Pacquiao threw a total of 1231 punches in the fight, missing 985 and landing 246. Clottey threw a total of 399 punches, 291 missed and 108 hit Manny. On November 19, 2011, after over a year away from the ring, Clottey returned to defeat Calvin Green via TKO in the second round. Since then however, Clottey confirmed that he'd retired from boxing to care for a sick relative.

==== Comeback ====
On August 23, 2013, Star Boxing announced Clottey's return to boxing as they have signed the former champion to a contract. Clottey returned to the ring on September 14, 2013, when he faced Dashon Johnson. Clottey defeated Johnson via unanimous decision. On April 9, 2014, Clottey went on to beat former middleweight champion Anthony Mundine, dropping Mundine five times. Clottey was in line to fight Canelo Alvarez in December 2014, but Canelo had to pull out due to an ankle injury. On December 19, 2015, Clottey faced Gabriel Rosado at a 158-lb catchweight. Despite having success and leading early in the fight, Clottey was outworked over ten rounds. He lost via unanimous decision. Clottey clarified in February 2018 that he has yet to retire in boxing. The most recent fight in which he won was against opponent Azziz Mponda from Tanzania. Clottey won by TKO in round 8.

== Fighting style ==
Clottey has a balanced combination of size, speed, stamina, power, endurance, ring savvy, and a solid chin. In addition, he is a puncher with effective countering ability. He stands upright while holding his arms and gloves high to protect himself, which is similar to Winky Wright's defensive stance. As a result of his prowess and ability to absorb a punch, he has never lost a bout via knockout.

== Personal life ==
Born in Accra, Ghana, Clottey now lives in The Bronx, New York.

== Professional boxing record ==
47 fights	41 wins	5 losses
By knockout	24	0
By decision	17	4
By disqualification	0	1
No contests	1	

No.	Result	Record	Opponent	Type	Round, time	Date	Location	Notes
47	Win	41–5 (1)	Aziiz Mpomda	TKO	9 (10)	22 Sep 2019	Odwira Akropong, Ghana	
46	Win	40–5 (1)	Mfaume Mfaume	TKO	6 (10)	8 Mar 2019	Bukom Boxing Arena, Accra, Ghana	
45	Loss	39–5 (1)	Gabriel Rosado	UD	10	19 Dec 2015	Turning Stone Resort Casino, Verona, New York, U.S.	
44	Win	39–4 (1)	Jorge Silva	UD	10	9 May 2015	Minute Maid Park, Houston, Texas, US	
43	Win	38–4 (1)	Anthony Mundine	UD	12	9 Apr 2014	Entertainment Centre, Newcastle, Australia	Won WBA International super welterweight title
42	Win	37–4 (1)	Dashon Johnson	UD	10	14 Sep 2013	The Paramount, Huntington, New York, US	
41	Win	36–4 (1)	Calvin Green	TKO	2 (8), 1:56	19 Nov 2011	Reliant Arena, Houston, Texas, US	
40	Loss	35–4 (1)	Manny Pacquiao	UD	12	13 Mar 2010	Cowboys Stadium, Arlington, Texas, US	For WBO welterweight title
39	Loss	35–3 (1)	Miguel Cotto	SD	12	13 Jun 2009	Madison Square Garden, New York City, New York, US	For WBO welterweight title
38	Win	35–2 (1)	Zab Judah	TD	9 (12), 1:12	2 Aug 2008	Pearl Concert Theater, Paradise, Nevada, US	Won vacant IBF welterweight title; Unanimous TD: Judah cut from an accidental head clash
37	Win	34–2 (1)	José Luis Cruz	TKO	5 (10), 2:48	3 Apr 2008	Aviator Sports & Events Center, New York City, New York, US	
36	Win	33–2 (1)	Shamone Alvarez	UD	12	20 Dec 2007	The Joint, Paradise, Nevada, US	
35	Win	32–2 (1)	Felix Flores	UD	10	9 Aug 2007	The Joint, Paradise, Nevada, US	
34	Win	31–2 (1)	Diego Corrales	UD	10	7 Apr 2007	Abou Ben Adhem Shrine Mosque, Springfield, Missouri, US	
33	Loss	30–2 (1)	Antonio Margarito	UD	12	2 Dec 2006	Boardwalk Hall, Atlantic City, New Jersey, US	For WBO welterweight title
32	Win	30–1 (1)	Richard Gutierrez	MD	12	29 Jul 2006	Chumash Casino Resort, Santa Ynez, California, US	Won IBF Inter-Continental welterweight title
31	Win	29–1 (1)	Marcos Primera	UD	10	3 Dec 2005	Mandalay Bay Events Center, Paradise, Nevada, US	Won vacant WBC Continental Americas interim super welterweight title
30	Win	28–1 (1)	Marlon Thomas	UD	10	21 Oct 2005	Turning Stone Resort Casino, Verona, New York, US	
29	NC	27–1 (1)	Steve Martinez	NC	2 (10)	18 Feb 2005	Boardwalk Hall, Atlantic City, New Jersey, US	Martinez cut from an accidental head clash
28	Win	27–1	Christopher Henry	TKO	5 (10), 1:16	24 Jul 2004	Flamingo, Laughlin, Nevada, US	
27	Win	26–1	Christian Lloyd Joseph	UD	10	6 Jun 2004	Mid-Hudson Civic Center, Poughkeepsie, New York, US	
26	Win	25–1	Jeffrey Hill	RTD	6 (8), 3:00	21 Nov 2003	Crowne Plaza Hotel, New York City, New York, US	
25	Win	24–1	Ayitey Powers	UD	10	6 Dec 2002	Globe Cinema, Accra, Ghana	
24	Win	23–1	Siki Benge	TKO	2 (10)	30 Nov 2001	Kaneshie Sports Complex, Accra, Ghana	
23	Win	22–1	Didier Mebara	TKO	3 (8)	8 Sep 2001	Kaneshie Sports Complex, Accra, Ghana	
22	Win	21–1	Ike Obi	TKO	10 (12)	27 Apr 2001	Kaneshie Sports Complex, Accra, Ghana	Won vacant African welterweight title
21	Loss	20–1	Carlos Baldomir	DQ	12 (12), 2:30	29 Nov 1999	Wembley Arena, London, England	For WBC International and vacant IBC welterweight titles; Clottey disqualified for repeated headbutts
20	Win	20–0	Viktor Baranov	TKO	6 (8), 0:44	19 Oct 1999	York Hall, London, England	
19	Win	19–0	Ali Mohammed	KO	1 (10)	1 May 1999	Accra, Ghana	
18	Win	18–0	Dennis Berry	RTD	3 (6), 3:00	23 May 1998	York Hall, London, England	
17	Win	17–0	Ike Obi	PTS	8	11 Nov 1997	Sports Stadium, Accra, Ghana	
16	Win	16–0	Cam Raeside	TKO	2 (8), 1:13	30 Aug 1997	Grundy Park Leisure Centre, Cheshunt, England	
15	Win	15–0	Mark Ramsey	PTS	8	25 Mar 1997	Lewisham Theatre, London, England	
14	Win	14–0	Abbas De Souza	TKO	2 (10)	28 Dec 1996	Accra, Ghana	
13	Win	13–0	Karl Taylor	TKO	2 (8)	7 Oct 1996	Lewisham Theatre, London, England	
12	Win	12–0	Dick Dosseh	TKO	6 (10)	3 Aug 1996	Accra, Ghana	
11	Win	11–0	Marciano Commey	PTS	12	22 Dec 1995	Kaneshie Sports Complex, Accra, Ghana	Won vacant Ghanaian light welterweight title
10	Win	10–0	Friday Steve Egwatu	TKO	2 (10)	17 Nov 1995	Abidjan, Ivory Coast	
9	Win	9–0	Ran Coco	TKO	3 (8)	25 Oct 1995	Accra, Ghana	
8	Win	8–0	Sam Akromah	PTS	8	25 Aug 1995	Accra, Ghana	
7	Win	7–0	David Duke	TKO	1	14 Jul 1995	Togo	
6	Win	6–0	Friday Steve Egwatu	TKO	5	30 Jun 1995	Accra, Ghana	
5	Win	5–0	Nazah Ayetoe	TKO	5	3 Jun 1995	Benin	
4	Win	4–0	Jomo Jackson	TKO	1	27 May 1995	Accra, Ghana	
3	Win	3–0	Smart Abbey	TKO	4	29 Apr 1995	Accra, Ghana	
2	Win	2–0	Joseph Ayinakwa	TKO	2	14 Apr 1995	Benin	
1	Win	1–0	Samuel Lotsu	PTS	6	31 Mar 1995	Accra, Ghana	

== Pay-per-view bouts ==
No.	Date	Fight	Billing	Buys	Network	Revenue
1	March 13, 2010	Clottey vs. Pacquiao	The Event	700,000	HBO	$35,300,000

Sporting positions
Regional boxing titles
Vacant Title last held by Kofi Jantuah	Ghanaian light welterweight champion 22 December 1995 – August 1996; Vacated	Vacant Title next held by Awel Abdulai
Vacant Title last held by Napoleon Alabi	ABU welterweight champion 27 April 2001 – June 2001; Vacated	Vacant Title next held by Karim Harzouz
New title	WBC Continental Americas super welterweight champion Interim title 3 December 2005 – July 2006; Vacated	Vacant Title next held by Ulises David Lopez
Vacant Title next held by Jan Zaveck	IBF Inter-Continental welterweight champion 29 July 2006 – September 2006; Vacated	Vacant Title next held by Cristian De Martinis
Preceded by Anthony Mundine	WBA International super welterweight champion 9 April 2014 – May 2015; Vacated	Vacant Title next held by Michel Soro
World boxing titles
Vacant Title last held by Antonio Margarito	IBF welterweight champion August 2, 2008 – April 18, 2009; Stripped	Vacant Title next held by Isaac Hlatshwayo
