= Khabib Allakhverdiev =

Russian boxer

Khabib Allakhverdiev Хабиб Аллахвердиев
Personal information
- Nickname: The Hawk
- Nationality: Russian
- Born: Khabib Mevlidinovich Allakhverdiev; 8 December 1982 (age 43) Kaspiysk, Dagestan ASSR, Soviet Union (now Russia)
- Height: 1.73 m (5 ft 8 in)
- Weight: Light-welterweight

Boxing career
- Reach: 173 cm (68 in)
- Stance: Southpaw

Boxing record
- Total fights: 21
- Wins: 19
- Win by KO: 9
- Losses: 2
Medal record
Men's amateur boxing
Representing Russia
World Championships
Bronze medal – third place	Mianyang 2005	Lightweight

Khabib Mevlidinovich Allakhverdiev (Russian: Хабиб Мевлидинович Аллахвердиев; Lezgian: Аллагьвердийрин Мавлудинан хва Гьабиб; born 8 December 1982) is a Russian former professional boxer who competed from 2007 to 2015. He held the WBA (Regular) and IBO super-lightweight titles from 2012 to 2014, and as an amateur won a bronze medal in the lightweight division at the 2005 World Championships.

== Amateur career ==
Allakhverdiev, an ethnic Lezgin, won bronze at the 2005 World Amateur Boxing Championships in the lightweight division, losing to eventual winner Yordenis Ugás.

Allakhverdiev had an amateur record of around 220 fights.

== Professional career ==
He turned professional in 2007 and was promoted by Warriors Boxing and Top Rank. His biggest accomplishments came in 2012, when he first won the IBO junior welterweight title against Kaizer Mabuza, knocking him out in four rounds. The following year he defeated then-unbeaten Joan Guzmán on a technical decision to win the vacant WBA super lightweight regular title. Allakhverdiev was supposed to make a defense with Breidis Prescott but he got injured and pulled out so Terence Crawford replaced him. One defense was made of both titles in 2013, when Allakhverdiev defeated Souleymane M'baye via late-rounds stoppage. In 2014, Allakhverdiev suffered his first professional loss in a closely contested bout against Jessie Vargas, which went the full twelve-round distance. In 2015, he lost by TKO to Adrien Broner, and has not fought since.

== Professional boxing record ==
21 fights	19 wins	2 losses
By knockout	9	1
By decision	9	1
By disqualification	1	0

No.	Result	Record	Opponent	Type	Round, time	Date	Location	Notes
21	Loss	19–2	(United States) Adrien Broner	TKO	12 (12), 2:23	3 Oct 2015	(United States) U.S. Bank Arena, Cincinnati, Ohio, US	For vacant WBA super-lightweight title
20	Loss	19–1	(United States) Jessie Vargas	UD	12	12 Apr 2014	(United States) MGM Grand Garden Arena, Paradise, Nevada, US	Lost WBA (Regular) and IBO super-lightweight titles
19	Win	19–0	(France) Souleymane M'baye	TKO	11 (12), 2:27	13 Jul 2013	Salle des Etoiles, Monte Carlo, Monaco	Retained WBA (Regular) and IBO super-lightweight titles
18	Win	18–0	(Dominican Republic) Joan Guzmán	TD	8 (12)	30 Nov 2012	(United States) BB&T Center, Sunrise, Florida, US	Retained IBO super-lightweight title; Won vacant WBA (Regular) super-lightweight title; Split TD after Guzmán could not continue from a knee injury
17	Win	17–0	(South Africa) Kaizer Mabuza	KO	4 (12) 1:01	20 Jun 2012	CSKA Ice Palace, Moscow, Russia	Won IBO super-lightweight title
16	Win	16–0	(Colombia) Ignacio Mendoza	TKO	7 (12), 0:23	8 Feb 2012	Metallurg Stadium, Samara, Russia	Won vacant WBA Fedelatin super-lightweight title
15	Win	15–0	(United States) Nate Campbell	TD	6 (10), 0:54	25 Sep 2011	Sports Palace Olymp, Krasnodar, Russia	Unanimous TD after Campbell was cut from an accidental head clash
14	Win	14–0	(Russia) Maxim Smirnov	UD	8	2 Jul 2011	Peshchera Night Club, Tyumen, Russia	
13	Win	13–0	(Puerto Rico) Juan Nazario	UD	6	19 Oct 2010	(United States) Hard Rock Live, Hollywood, Florida, US	
12	Win	12–0	(Russia) Karen Tevosyan	UD	12	23 May 2010	Red Square, Moscow, Russia	Won vacant WBC–ABCO super-lightweight title
11	Win	11–0	(Mexico) Francisco Rios Gil	KO	1 (6), 1:29	30 Oct 2009	(United States) Cambria County War Memorial Arena, Johnstown, Pennsylvania, US	
10	Win	10–0	(Uzbekistan) Abdulaziz Matazimov	TKO	5 (8), 1:54	30 May 2009	Sports Palace, Tyumen, Russia	
9	Win	9–0	(The Bahamas) Richard Pitt	TKO	1 (6), 2:19	27 Feb 2009	(United States) Hard Rock Live, Hollywood, Florida, US	
8	Win	8–0	(Tanzania) Maliki Kinyogoli	UD	6	21 Nov 2008	Ice Palace, Saint Petersburg, Russia	
7	Win	7–0	(Ghana) Roland Mills	TKO	3 (6), 0:41	6 Sep 2008	Red Square, Moscow, Russia	
6	Win	6–0	(Costa Rica) Gustavo Miller	UD	4	13 Oct 2007	Khodynka Arena, Moscow, Russia	
5	Win	5–0	(Puerto Rico) Josean Escalera	SD	4	31 Aug 2007	(United States) Boardwalk Hall, Atlantic City, New Jersey, US	
4	Win	4–0	(Puerto Rico) Roberto Acevedo	DQ	4 (4), 2:48	2 Jun 2007	(United States) Boardwalk Hall, Atlantic City, New Jersey, US	Acevedo disqualified for repeated holding
3	Win	3–0	(The Bahamas) Damian Tinker	UD	4	16 May 2007	(United States) Hard Rock Live, Hollywood, Florida, US	
2	Win	2–0	(United States) Devarise Crayton	KO	1 (4), 1:33	20 Apr 2007	(United States) Community Center, Port St. Lucie, Florida, US	
1	Win	1–0	(Mexico) Miguel Ortiz	KO	1 (4), 2:59	10 Mar 2007	(United States) Madison Square Garden, New York City, New York, US	

Sporting positions
Regional boxing titles
Vacant Title last held by Kanat Kartenbayev	WBC–ABCO super-lightweight champion 23 May 2010 – October 2010; Vacated	Vacant Title next held by Ruslan Provodnikov
Vacant Title last held by Johan Pérez	WBA Fedelatin super-lightweight champion 8 February 2012 – June 2012; Vacated	Vacant Title next held by Alberto Mosquera
Minor world boxing titles
Preceded by Kaizer Mabuza	IBO super-lightweight champion 20 June 2012 – 12 April 2014	Succeeded by Jessie Vargas
Major world boxing titles
Vacant Title last held by Marcos Maidana	WBA super lightweight champion Regular title 30 November 2012 – 12 April 2014	Succeeded by Jessie Vargas
