= Rafał Jackiewicz =

Polish boxer (born 1977)

Personal information
- Nickname: Braveheart
- Nationality: Polish
- Born: Rafał Jackiewicz; February 17, 1977 (age 49) Mińsk Mazowiecki
- Height: 5 ft 8 in (1.73 m)
- Weight: Welterweight

Boxing career
- Reach: 68 in (173 cm)
- Stance: Orthodox

Boxing record
- Total fights: 84
- Wins: 51
- Win by KO: 22
- Losses: 30
- Draws: 3
- No contests: 0

Rafał Jackiewicz (born February 17, 1977) is a Polish professional boxer who fights in welterweight division. He is a former EBU welterweight champion. His professional debut took place on 17 February 2001. Jackiewicz defeated Milan Smetana from Slovakia, winning by points after a four-round bout. His professional record includes 84 fights: 51 wins (22 knockouts), 30 losses and 3 draws.

On June 10, 2006 in Kędzierzyn-Koźle, Poland, Jackiewicz had a chance to win the International Boxing Council (IBC) welterweight title. After 12 rounds of boxing the Pole defeated Joel Sebastian Mayo by unanimous decision of the judges.

== EBU Welterweight Champion ==
On September 14, 2008 in Kielce, Poland, Jackiewicz won the European Boxing Union (EBU) welterweight belt. The Pole defeated Jackson Osei Bonsu, who previously successfully defended the title four times. The scorecards were: 117:110 (judge Franco Ciminale), 114:113 (judge Michael Hook) and 116:112 (judge Robert Verwijs).

== Jackiewicz vs. Zavec I ==
The first Jackiewicz’s defense of the title took place at Spodek Hall in Katowice, Poland. The Pole’s rival, Dejan Zavec lost for the first time in his professional career. Jackiewicz won by split decision. The scorecards were: 116:113 (judge Raiko Djajic and 115:114 (judge Michael Hook) for the Pole. Judge Sergio Silvi's type was 116:113 for Zavec.

== Other fights for the EBU belt ==
On February 28, 2009 in Lublin, Poland, Jackiewicz retained his belt after unanimous decision over Luciano Abis. The Italian rival, similarly to Zavec, lost for the first time in his professional career.

On March 18, 2009 Jackiewicz resigned the EBU belt and started his preparations to the official IBF eliminator against Delvin Rodriguez. Both fighters came face-to-face on November 27, 2009 in Ełk. In general, the bout elapsed to Jackiewicz's dictation. However, he was hit powerfully in the sixth round and Rodriguez was close to finish him. The Pole landed on the canvas early in the sixth round but managed to continue the fight and won via unanimous decision. The scorecards were 117:116, 114:112, 115:112. Jackiewicz became the official IBF contender.

Before the championship bout, Jackiewicz defeated an average fighter from Turkey, Turgay Uzun in Strzelce Opolskie, Poland. The fight lacked spectacular moments but the Pole's advantage was unquestionable. According to judges, the Polish welterweight won each round.

== Jackiewicz vs. Zavec II ==
The most important challenge of the Pole’s career was a fight for the IBF welterweight title which took place on September 4, 2010 Jackiewicz went to Ljubljana, Slovenia to face the champion, Dejan Zavec. After an average performance, Jackiewicz lost via points and suffered the first professional defeat. The fighter from Slovenia was more active and was dealing series of blows, contrary to Jackiewicz who limited himself to single punches. The Pole was able to gain slight advantage only in the sixth round and in the eighth one. The scorecards were 117:111 (judge Howard John Foster), 117:111 (judge Zdravko Milojevic) and 114:114 (judge Leszek Jankowiak).

== Titles ==
Pro Boxing

- 2008-09 EBU welterweight European champion (2 title defences)
- 2006 IBC welterweight world champion (1 title defence)
- 2006 Polish International welterweight champion

Amateur Kickboxing

- 1996 W.A.K.O. European Championships in Belgrade, Yugoslavia (bronze) -69 kg (Light-Contact)

== Professional boxing record ==
50 Wins (22 knockouts, 28 decisions), 25 Losses, 2 Draws
Res.	Record	Opponent	Type	Rd., Time	Date	Location	Notes
Win	50-19-2	(Belarus) Aliaksandr Dzemka	MD	6	2018-06-02	(Poland) G2A Arena, Rzeszów	
Loss	49-19-2	(Poland) Robert Świerzbiński	MD	6	2018-05-25	(Poland) Stadion Narodowy, Warsaw	
Loss	49-18-2	(Spain) Ruben Diaz	UD	12	2017-11-18	(Spain) Ezkabarte	For EBU-EU (European Union) Middleweight Title
Win	49-17-2	(Poland) Sebastian Skrzypczynski	PTS	6	2017-08-26	(Poland) Kałuszyn	
Loss	48-17-2	(Poland) Patryk Szymański	UD	10	2017-05-20	(Poland) Hala Arena, Poznań	For vacant Republic Of Poland Super Welterweight Title
Loss	48-16-2	(Namibia) Bethuel Ushona	UD	12	2016-12-03	(Namibia) Ramatex Factory, Windhoek	For vacant World Boxing Federation World Welterweight Title
Loss	48-15-2	(Poland) Michal Syrowatka	UD	10	2016-04-02	(Poland) Tauron Arena, Kraków	
Win	48-14-2	(Bulgaria) Stiliyan Kostov	UD	10	2016-02-27	(Poland) MOSiR Hall, Radom	
Win	47-14-2	(Poland) Michal Syrowatka	TKO	4 (10), 0:43	2015-12-12	(Poland) Hala MOSiR, Ełk	
Loss	46-14-2	(Romania) Ionut Dan Ion	UD	8	2015-09-11	Ricoh Coliseum, Toronto, Canada	
Loss	46-13-2	(Poland) Kamil Szeremeta	UD	10	2015-04-18	(Poland) Legionowo	
Lose	46-12-2	(Italy) Gianluca Branco	RTD	6 (12)	2014-11-22	(Italy) Terracina	For EBU Welterweight title
Win	46-11-2	(Poland) Krzysztof Szot	UD	8	2014-08-16	(Poland) Międzyzdroje	
Win	45–11–2	(Poland) Filip Rzadek	TD	4	2014-04-12	(Poland) Częstochowa	
Win	44–11–2	(Hungary) Lajos Munkacsi	UD	6	2013-11-30	(Poland) Częstochowa	
Win	43–11–2	(Poland) Michał Żeromski	UD	8	2013-10-19	(Poland) Wieliczka	
Loss	42–11–2	(Italy) Leonard Bundu	KO	11 (12)	2013-04-06	(Italy) Rome	For EBU Welterweight title
Draw	42–10–2	(England) Rick Godding	MD	10	2012-11-10	(Germany) Hamburg	
Win	42–10–1	(Italy) Luca Michael Pasqua	UD	10	2012-06-30	(Poland) Łódź	
Win	41–10–1	(Italy) Luciano Abis	TKO	7 (12)	2012-05-26	(Italy) Quartu Sant'Elena	Won EBU-EU Welterweight title
Win	40–10–1	(Belgium) Farid El Houari	RTD	4 (6)	2006-04-22	(Poland) Racibórz	
Win	39–10–1	(Germany) Andre Deobald	UD	6	2011-11-12	(Poland) Gdynia	
Loss	38–10–1	(England) Kell Brook	TKO	6 (12)	2011-10-08	(England) Sheffield	For WBA Inter-Continental Welterweight title
Win	38–9–1	(Morocco) Tarik Sahibeddine	KO	2 (8)	2011-03-05	(Poland) Krynica-Zdrój	
Win	37–9–1	(Nicaragua) Ronny McField	UD	8	2010-11-20	(Poland) Nysa	
Loss	36–9–1	(Slovenia) Jan Zaveck	MD	12	2010-12-20	(Slovenia) Ljubljana	For IBF Welterweight title
Win	36–8–1	(Germany) Turgay Uzun	UD	8	2010-03-20	(Poland) Strzelce Opolskie	
Win	35–8–1	(Dominican Republic) Delvin Rodriguez	UD	12	2009-11-27	(Poland) Ełk	
Win	34–8–1	(Italy) Luciano Abis	UD	12	2009-02-28	(Poland) Katowice	Retained EBU Welterweight title
Win	33–8–1	(Slovenia) Jan Zaveck	SD	12	2008-11-29	(Poland) Katowice	Retained EBU Welterweight title
Win	32–8–1	(Belgium) Jackson Osei Bonsu	UD	12	2008-09-14	(Poland) Kielce	Won EBU Welterweight title
Win	31–8–1	(Hungary) Laszlo Komjathi	TKO	1 (8)	2008-05-31	(Poland) Legnica	
Win	30–8–1	(Latvia) Deniss Aleksejevs	TKO	4 (8)	2008-04-19	(Poland) Katowice	
Win	29–8–1	(Romania) Mircea Lurci	KO	3 (6)	2007-12-15	(Poland) Rzeszów	
Win	28–8–1	(France) Fabrice Colombel	RTD	5 (8)	2007-10-20	(Poland) Warsaw	
Win	27–8–1	(Spain) Juan Martinez	PTS	8	2007-08-22	(Portugal) Porto	
Win	26–8–1	(Chile) Joel Mayo	KO	6 (12)	2007-05-26	(Poland) Katowice	
Win	25–8–1	(Latvia) Arturs Jaskuls	TKO	4 (8)	2007-03-24	(Poland) Wołów	
Win	24–8–1	(Latvia) Sergejs SavrinovicsArturs Jaskuls	UD	6	2007-02-24	(Poland) Głogów	
Win	23–8–1	(France) Nicolas Guisset	UD	12	2006-10-28	(Poland) Dębica	Retained IBC Welterweight title.
Win	22–8–1	(Chile) Joel Mayo	UD	12	2006-06-10	(Poland) Kędzierzyn Koźle	Won vacant IBC Welterweight title.
Win	21–8–1	(Ukraine) Yuriy Tsybenko	TKO	4 (6)	2006-05-20	(Poland) Ketrzyn	
Win	20–8–1	(Belarus) Siarhei Shnip	TKO	2 (8)	2006-05-06	(Poland) Krosno	
Win	19–8–1	(Belarus) Valeri Kharianau	KO	2 (6)	2006-03-25	(Poland) Siedlce	
Win	18–8–1	(France) David Sarraille	TKO	6 (10)	2006-01-21	(Poland) Busko-Zdrój	
Win	17–8–1	(United States) Joshua Smith	UD	8	2005-11-26	(United States) Chicago	
Win	16–8–1	(Slovakia) Igor Krbusik	TKO	2 (6)	2005-10-15	(Poland) Rzeszów	
Loss	15–8–1	(Italy) Giammario Grassellini	MD	12	2005-09-30	(Italy) Campobello di Mazara	For IBF Mediterranean Welterweight title
Win	15–7–1	(Russia) Rozalin Nasibulin	UD	6	2005-03-12	(Poland) Poznań	
Win	14–7–1	(Romania) Eugen Stan	PTS	6	2005-02-19	(Poland) Wołów	
Win	13–7–1	(Poland) Wojciech Konczalski	UD	4	2004-12-19	(Poland) Rzeszów	
Draw	12–7–1	(Poland) Slawomir Ziemlewicz	PTS	10	2004-11-26	(Poland) Warsaw	For vacant Polish Welterweight title
Loss	12–7	(Democratic Republic of the Congo) Ted Bami	PTS	8	2004-20-08	(England) Brentwood	
Loss	12–6	(Italy) Antonio Lauri	UD	10	2004-07-09	(Italy) Varese	For vacant EBU-EU Welterweight title
Loss	12–5	(England) Michael Jennings	PTS	8	2004-05-22	(England) Widnes	
Win	12–4	(Poland) Mariusz Biskupski	UD	6	2004-04-24	(Poland) Dąbrowa Górnicza	Won Polish International Welterweight title
Win	11–4	(Hungary) Karoly Domokos	UD	6	2004-03-27	(Poland) Radom	
Win	10–4	(Romania) Virgil Meleg	UD	6	2003-12-20	(Poland) Bielsko-Biała	
Win	9–4	(Romania) Vasile Herteg	KO	6 (10)	2003-12-06	(Poland) Tarnów	
Win	8–4	(Denmark) Allan Vester	KO	1 (6)	2003-10-04	(Germany) Zwickau	
Loss	7–4	(Poland) Jacek Bielski	MD	6	2003-09-27	(Poland) Gorzów Wielkopolski	
Loss	7–3	(France) Malik Cherchari	PTS	6	2003-04-12	(France) Échirolles	
Loss	7–2	(Poland) Mariusz Biskupski	MD	6	2003-02-15	(Poland) Zabrze	
Win	7–1	(United States) Karl David	KO	3 (6)	2002-05-24	(Poland) Płońsk	
Win	6–1	(Slovakia) Marek Kvocka	TKO	2 (6)	2002-05-04	(Poland) Wrocław	
Win	5–1	(Ukraine) Artur Atadzhanov	UD	6	2002-04-13	(Poland) Bielsko-Biała	
Loss	4–1	(Ukraine) Yuriy Nuzhnenko	UD	6	2001-11-24	(Poland) Łódź	
Win	4–0	(Czech Republic) Petr Rykala	KO	4 (6)	2011-10-27	(Poland) Pruszków	
Win	3–0	(Hungary) Zsolt Gyalog	TKO	2 (4)	2001-06-09	(Poland) Kołobrzeg	
Win	2–0	(Hungary) Attila Szabo	TKO	2 (4)	2001-04-28	(Poland) Inowrocław	
Win	1–0	(Slovakia) Milan Smetana	KO	4	2001-02-17	(Poland) Kołobrzeg	

Sporting positions
Preceded by Jackson Osei Bonsu	EBU Welterweight Champion; September 14, 2008 - March 18, 2009; Vacated	Succeeded by Selçuk Aydın; Filled vacancy
