= Bethuel Ushona =

Namibian boxer (born 1982)

Personal information
- Nickname: Unstoppable
- Nationality: Namibian
- Born: Bethuel Uushona; 9 March 1982 (age 44) Windhoek, Namibia
- Weight: welterweight

Boxing career
- Stance: Orthodox

Boxing record
- Total fights: 47
- Wins: 36
- Win by KO: 9
- Losses: 10
- Draws: 1

Bethuel Ushona (born 9 March 1982) is a Namibian boxer. He has held regional titles for the World Boxing Association (the Pan Asian Boxing Association title) and the World Boxing Organization (interim and full WBO African title). Ushona has also fought for the Commonwealth title, losing to Denton Vassell.

== Professional boxing record ==
42 fights	36 wins	5 losses
By knockout	9	1
By decision	27	4
Draws	1	

Result	Record	Opponent	Type	Round, time	Date	Location	Notes
Win	36–5–1	(Russia) Roman Belaev	UD	12	2017-06-30	(Democratic Republic of the Congo) Ramatex Hall, Windhoek	Retained World Boxing Federation World Welterweight Title
Win	35–5–1	(Poland) Rafal Jackiewicz	UD	12	2016-12-03	(Democratic Republic of the Congo) Ramatex Factory, Windhoek	Won vacant World Boxing Federation World Welterweight Title
Loss	34–5–1	(Germany) Deniz Ilbay	SD	12	2016-06-25	(Democratic Republic of the Congo) Indoor Sports Complex, Walvis Bay	For vacant World Boxing Federation World Welterweight Title
Loss	34–4–1	(Namibia) Sacky Shikukutu	SD	12	2015-12-05	(Democratic Republic of the Congo) Ramatex Factory, Windhoek	
Win	34–3–1	(Democratic Republic of the Congo) Bongo Lipembo	UD	12	2015-08-01	(Democratic Republic of the Congo) Ramatex Factory, Windhoek	
