= Julio Álamos =

Chilean boxer (born 1991)

Personal information
- Nickname: El Ingeniero
- Born: 3 February 1991 (age 35) Santiago, Chile
- Height: 6 ft 1 in (1.85 m)
- Weight: Middleweight Super middleweight

Boxing career
- Reach: 75 1/2 in (192 cm)
- Stance: Orthodox

Boxing record
- Total fights: 17
- Wins: 16
- Win by KO: 9
- Losses: 1

Julio Álamos Mumbrú (born 3 February 1991) is a Chilean professional boxer.

== Early life ==
Álamos was born on 3 February 1991 to a well-to-do family in Santiago, Chile. He first began boxing when a gym opened up in neighboring Vitacura when he was 14 years old, but also tried sports like basketball, football and athletics. He then joined the Chilean Navy with hopes of becoming a Marine, but left after two years because he felt he was wasting his time and instead enrolled at the Universidad del Desarrollo to study commercial engineering.

=== Amateur career ===
He made his return to the ring and made his amateur debut at the age of 19, losing his first match in the first round by referee stoppage as a result of a bloody nose. He attempted to qualify for the 2014 South American Games, which were held in his hometown of Santiago, but was beaten by national teammate Joseph Cherkashyn for the spot. After this loss he moved up from middleweight to light heavyweight, where he would remain throughout the rest of his amateur career. He also made the decision to move to New York City to further his career, training under Michael Kozlowski at Gleason's Gym in Brooklyn for a year and becoming New York state champion. He also won a gold medal at the 2013 Ringside World Championships in the men's novice division.

In 2014 he competed at the Ringside World Championships again in Kansas City, Missouri, then returned to his homeland and won first place at the Chilean national championships in Cerro Navia. He began the next year with a silver-medal finish at the 34th annual Copa Independencia in the Dominican Republic before suffering early exits at the 2015 Pan American Games qualifiers and the Panamerican Championships. He also reached the quarterfinals of the 2016 American Olympic Qualification Tournament, where he fell to Albert Ramírez of Venezuela.

== Professional career ==
Álamos made his professional debut on 23 September 2016, defeating Gaston Ávalos via third-round technical knockout (TKO) at the Teatro Caupolicán in Santiago. After a string of victories he faced compatriot Arnoldo Poblete for his Chilean super middleweight title on 14 July 2017, although the champion had technically vacated his belt just before the fight by weighing in over the 168 pound limit. Nevertheless, Álamos knocked Poblete out late in the third round to become the national super middleweight champion. In December he beat César Reynoso by unanimous decision (UD) for the vacant South American super middleweight title at the Gran Arena Monticello in Mostazal, and successfully defended it by fourth-round TKO in June 2018 against Brazilian rival Felipe Santos Pedroso at the Teatro Caupolicán. He entered an agreement with Canal 13 to broadcast his fights, and his title defence against Santos Pedroso was the first boxing match to air on the channel in 30 years.

On 12 October 2018 he faced Argentine prospect Facundo Galovar for the vacant WBA Fedelatin super middleweight title at the Teatro Caupolicán. After Álamos suffered a fractured wrist in the fifth round, he went the distance and won the bout by unanimous decision with scores of 110–100, 110–101 and 109–103. The win moved him into the top 15 in the WBA rankings published later that month. He took eight months off before his next fight to heal his wrist, get shoulder surgery and finish his degree at the Universidad del Desarrollo, finally validating his El Ingeniero nickname. He returned on 14 June 2019 to defend his title against Argentine challenger Juan Gabriel Rizo Patrón in Mostazal, dropping him via second-round TKO to retain. He entered the top ten of the WBA rankings for the first time in October 2019.

== Professional boxing record ==
19 fights	16 wins	3 losses
By knockout	9	0
By decision	7	3

No.	Result	Record	Opponent	Type	Round, time	Date	Location	Notes
19	Loss	16–3	(France) Bakary Samake	UD	12	1 Jun 2024	Zenith de Paris-La Villette, Paris, France	
18	Loss	16–2	(Kazakhstan) Meiirim Nursultanov	UD	12	1 Nov 2023	Humo Arena, Tashkent, Uzbekistan	
17	Loss	16–1	(Italy) Etinosa Oliha	UD	12	1 Jul 2023	Uni-Halle, Wuppertal, Germany	For vacant IBO middleweight title
16	Win	16–0	(Germany) Bjoern Schicke	TKO	4 (12)	24 Feb 2023	AGON Sportpark, Charlottenburg, Germany	Won IBO Inter-Continental middleweight title
15	Win	15–0	(Argentina) Nicolas David Veron	TKO	3 (8), 2:15	22 Oct 2022	Gimnasio Club Mexico, Santiago, Chile	
14	Win	14–0	(Peru) Jesús Áviles	TKO	5 (8), 2:50	20 Aug 2022	Gimnasio Club Mexico, Santiago, Chile	
13	Win	13–0	(Peru) Jesús Áviles	UD	8	18 Oct 2019	Gimnasio Club Mexico, Santiago, Chile	
12	Win	12–0	(Argentina) Juan Gabriel Rizo Patrón	TKO	2 (11), 0:35	14 June 2019	Gran Arena Monticello, Mostazal, Chile	Retained WBA Fedelatin super middleweight title
11	Win	11–0	(Argentina) Facundo Galovar	UD	11	12 Oct 2018	Teatro Caupolicán, Santiago, Chile	Won vacant WBA Fedelatin super middleweight title
10	Win	10–0	(Brazil) Felipe Santos Pedroso	KO	4 (10), 2:55	15 June 2018	Teatro Caupolicán, Santiago, Chile	Retained South American super middleweight title
9	Win	9–0	(Argentina) Martín Ríos	UD	8	16 Mar 2018	Gimnasio Club Mexico, Santiago, Chile	
8	Win	8–0	(Argentina) César Reynoso	UD	10	9 Dec 2017	Gran Arena Monticello, Mostazal, Chile	Won vacant South American super middleweight title
7	Win	7–0	(Peru) Jairo Morán	TKO	6 (8), 0:38	13 Oct 2017	Gimnasio Club Mexico, Santiago, Chile	
6	Win	6–0	(Chile) Arnoldo Poblete	KO	3 (10), 2:59	14 Jul 2017	Gimnasio Club Mexico, Santiago, Chile	Won vacant Chilean super middleweight title; Title only on the line for Álamos
5	Win	5–0	(Argentina) Luis Garay	UD	8	28 April 2017	Gimnasio Club Mexico, Santiago, Chile	
4	Win	4–0	(Argentina) Martín Molina	UD	6	3 Feb 2017	Gimnasio Club Mexico, Santiago, Chile	
3	Win	3–0	(Argentina) Emiliano Vivas	UD	4	19 Nov 2016	Teatro Caupolicán, Santiago, Chile	
2	Win	2–0	(Brazil) Anderson de Jesus Cardoso	TKO	2 (4), 0:57	4 Nov 2016	Gimnasio Club Mexico, Santiago, Chile	
1	Win	1–0	(Argentina) Gaston Ávalos	TKO	3 (4), 2:14	23 Sep 2016	Teatro Caupolicán, Santiago, Chile	

== Personal life ==
He currently lives in Las Condes, where he opened his own gym, Habana Boxing Gym, in 2017.
