= Chordale Booker =

American boxer

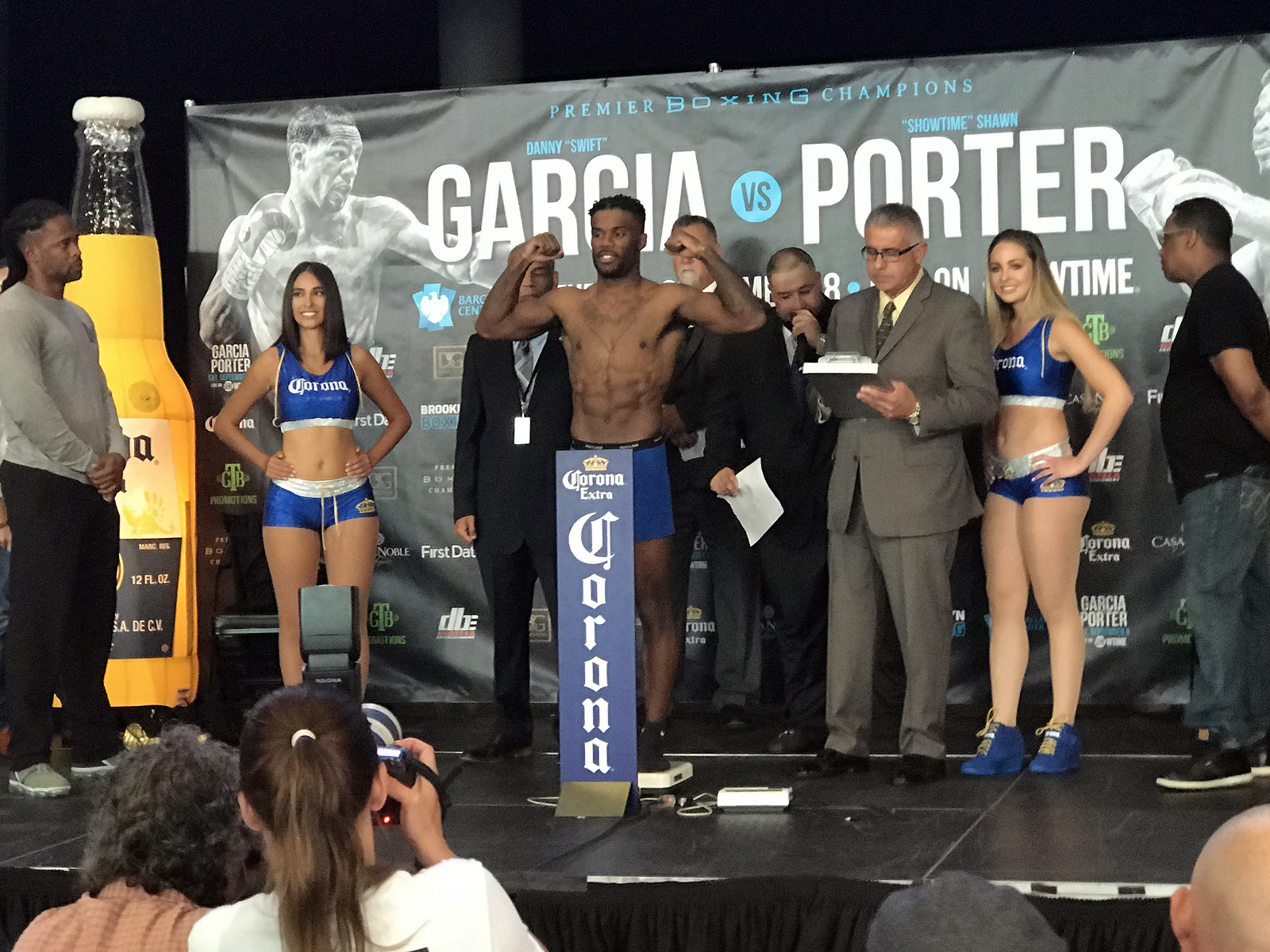

Personal information
- Born: Chordale Booker; May 7, 1991 (age 35) Stamford, Connecticut, U.S.
- Height: 5 ft 9 in (175 cm)
- Weight: Super welterweight
- Website: www.chordale.com

Boxing career
- Reach: 70 in (178 cm)
- Stance: Southpaw

Boxing record
- Total fights: 27
- Wins: 25
- Win by KO: 13
- Losses: 2

Chordale Booker (born May 7, 1991) is an American professional boxer promoted non-exclusively under Premier Boxing Champions.

== Amateur career ==
As an amateur, he compiled a record of 111-19 fighting out of New York Athletic Club, and was a two-time New York Metro Champion (2013, 2014), a three-time New York Boxing Champion (2012, 2013, 2014), and the top ranked middleweight champion in the U.S. in 2015, earning him a spot in the 2016 Olympic Boxing Trials where he lost a decision to eventual Olympian Charles Conwell by a point. Despite a late start in the sport, Booker quickly rose to become one of the most accomplished amateurs in his weight class over the last several years. His accolades include:

- 2016 Olympic Boxing Trials
- 2015 Elite National Champion
- 2015 Golden Gloves Champion
- 2015 Sugar Ray Robinson Most Outstanding Boxer
- 2015 Connecticut Boxing Hall Of Fame Amateur Boxer Of The Year
- 2015 Fairfield County Sports Person Of The Year
- 2014 USA Elite Mens Silver Medalist
- 2013 USA Elite Mens Bronze Medalist
- 2013 Northeast Regional Champion
- 2013, 2014 New York Metro Champion (165 lbs)
- 2012, 2013, 2014 New York Boxing Champion (165 lbs)
- 2012, 2013 Pure Breed Champion
- 2012 Adidas National PAL Champion
- 2012 Elite Heat Champion
- 2011 Golden Champion
- 2011 Most Outstanding Novice

== Professional career ==
Booker made his professional debut on March 5, 2016, scoring a 2nd-round TKO against Antonio Allen at the Sands Bethlehem Event Center in Bethlehem, Pennsylvania.

Since his pro debut, his personal and professional stories have been featured in several national and local news outlets, including Complex on Fox 5 NY

== Professional Boxing Record ==
Professional record summary
26 fights	24 wins	2 losses
By knockout	13	2
By decision	12	0

No.	Result	Record	Opponent	Type	Round, Time	Date	Location	Notes
27	Win	25–2	(Ghana) Issah Samir	RTD	3, 3:00	2026-6-6	(United States) Palace Theater, Waterbury, Connecticut, U.S.	
26	Win	24–2	(Ghana) Patrick Allotey	KO	3, 2:22	2025-8-16	(United States) Royale Nightclub, Boston, Massachusetts, U.S.	
25	Loss	23–2	(United States) Sebastian Fundora	TKO	4, 2:51	2025-3-22	(United States) Michelob Ultra Arena, Las Vegas, Nevada, U.S.	For WBC and WBO super welterweight titles
24	Win	23–1	(Argentina) Brian Damian Chaves	TKO	3, 3:00	2024-6-15	(United States) Mohegan Sun Casino, Uncasville, Connecticut, U.S.	
23	Win	22–1	(United States) Greg Vendetti	UD	10	2024-2-3	(United States) Mohegan Sun Casino, Uncasville, Connecticut, U.S.	Won Vacant WBC USA Super Welterweight Title
22	Win	21–1	(Dominican Republic) Julio de Jesus Rodriguez	TKO	2, 1:36	2023-10-11	Bávaro Convention Center, Punta Cana, Dominican Republic	
21	Win	20–1	(United States) Nicolas Hernandez	KO	7, 2:41	2023-8-12	(United States) Mohegan Sun Casino, Uncasville, Connecticut, U.S.	Defended WBC USA Super welterweight title
20	Win	19–1	(Ghana) Daniel Aduku	KO	4, 1:54	2023-1-21	(United States) Mohegan Sun Casino, Uncasville, Connecticut, US	Won Vacant WBC USA Super Welterweight Title
19	Win	18–1	(United States) Angel Hernandez	UD	8	2023-1-21	(United States) Mohegan Sun Casino, Uncasville, Connecticut, US	
18	Loss	17–1	(United States) Austin Williams	TKO	1, 2:25	2022-4-30	(United States) Madison Square Garden, New York, New York, US	
17	Win	17–0	(Mexico) Silverio Ortiz	UD	8	2021-9-24	(United States) Connecticut Convention Center, Hartford, Connecticut, US	
16	Win	16–0	(United States) Sanny Duversonne	SD	8	2020-11-4	(United States) Microsoft Theater, Los Angeles, US	
15	Win	15–0	(Nigeria) Wale Omotoso	UD	10	2019-5-25	(United States) Beau Rivage Casino, Biloxi, Mississippi, US	
14	Win	14–0	(Colombia) Juan De Angel	UD	8	2019-1-26	(United States) Barclays Center, Brooklyn, New York, US	
13	Win	13–0	(United States) Jason Wahr	KO	1	2018-11-17	(United States) Extravaganza, Charlotte, North Carolina, US	
12	Win	12–0	(United States) Ve Shawn Owens	SD	8	2018-9-8	(United States) Barclays Center, Brooklyn, New York, US	
11	Win	11–0	(Dominican Republic) José Manuel Saint-Hilaire Gil	KO	1	2018-8-12	Casa de los Clubes, Villa Juana, Santo Domingo, Dominican Republic	
10	Win	10–0	(United States) Travis Hartman	KO	1	2018-4-28	(United States) Don Haskins Center, El Paso, Texas, US	
9	Win	9–0	(United States) Emmanuel Sanchez	UD	6	2018-3-18	(United States) Barclays Center, Brooklyn, New York, US	
8	Win	8–0	(United States) Malcolm McAllister	UD	8	2017-10-14	(United States) Barclays Center, Brooklyn, New York, US	
7	Win	7–0	(United States) Bryan Goldsby	KO	2	2017-7-29	(United States) Abundant Life Center, Raleigh, North Carolina, US	
6	Win	6–0	(United States) Moshea Aleem	UD	6	2017-3-17	(United States) Santander Arena, Reading, Pennsylvania, US	
5	Win	5–0	(United States) Andre Baker	TKO	1, 3:00	2017-2-18	(United States) The Hive, Greensboro, North Carolina, US	
4	Win	4–0	(United States) Dawond Pickney	UD	4	2016-12-10	(United States) Sands Bethlehem Event Center, Bethlehem, Pennsylvania, US	
3	Win	3–0	(United States) Brandon Phillips Black	UD	4	2016-8-21	(United States) Ford Amphitheater, Brooklyn, New York, US	
2	Win	2–0	(United States) Tolutomi Agunbiade	KO	2, 1:41	2016-4-29	(United States) Trump Taj Mahal, Atlantic City, New Jersey, US	
1	Win	1–0	(United States) Antonio Allen	TKO	2, 1:56	2016-3-5	(United States) Sands Bethlehem Event Center, Bethlehem, Pennsylvania, US	Professional debut.

== Personal life ==
After avoiding jail time and receiving three years probation for gun and narcotics charge as a juvenile, Booker took up training in Stamford, Connecticut under former light heavyweight pro Ahmad Mickens at Revolution Training and Fitness, where he also works as a personal trainer.

Between fights, Booker works as a personal trainer at Revolution Training in Stamford, CT. Additionally, he coaches Golden Gloves fighters Jacqueline Boyle (132) and Catie Ramsey (125), as well as MMA fighters Kastriot Xhema and Theodore Macuka.

Booker appeared in a 2017 MSNBC commercial for Hardball with Chris Matthews with the host. He made his modeling debut along with former WWE Diva Summer Rae at the September 2018 New York Fashion Week runway show for designer ACID NYC. In 2019 he starred in a commercial and was featured in print advertising for SentinelOne.

In November 2018, Booker launched the "Go The Distance Foundation" at Trailblazers Academy in Stamford. Booker said: “The No. 1 thing I want to do is break down the barriers between at-risk youth and the police. I don’t want our kids to think they can’t have a conversation with a police officer. I want to create a place with an atmosphere where we can create a dialog and conversation with both points of view."

== "The Boxer" Documentary ==
Booker was the subject of a documentary short that premiered in November 2016 at three film festivals: DOC NYC, the Big Apple Film Festival, and New York Short Film Festival. The film is directed by Craig Cutler and produced by Fela Cortes.

DOC NYC description reads:

The Boxer is an intimate portrait of Chordale Booker, a gifted USA boxer and National Champion with a storied past. Following a court ruling that afforded Chordale a second chance at life, he vowed to make right and fight his battles in the place he knew best, the ring. Follow his tumultuous journey through the lens of director and photographer, Craig Cutler.

The film was awarded the Big Apple Film Festival's Best Short Documentary.
