= Jorge Garcia Perez =

Mexico professional boxer (born 1997)

Personal information
- Nickname: Chino
- Born: Jorge Luis Garcia Perez; January 8, 1997 (age 29) Mexico
- Height: 6 ft 0 in (183 cm)
- Weight: Light middleweight

Boxing career
- Stance: Orthodox

Boxing record
- Total fights: 39
- Wins: 34
- Win by KO: 27
- Losses: 5

Jorge Luis Garcia Perez (born January 8, 1997) is a Mexican professional boxer. He has held the International Boxing Organization (IBO) light-middleweight title in 2024 and challenged for the World Boxing Organization (WBO) light-middleweight title in July 2025.

== Professional career ==
=== Garcia Perez vs. Conwell ===
Garcia Perez faced Charles Conwell in the Frontwave Arena, Oceanside, California USA, on April 19, 2025. He upset and defeated Conwell by split decision.

== Professional boxing record ==
| 39 fights | 34 wins | 5 losses |
|---|---|---|
| By knockout | 27 | 0 |
| By decision | 7 | 5 |

| No. | Result | Record | Opponent | Type | Round, time | Date | Location | Notes |
|---|---|---|---|---|---|---|---|---|
| 39 | Win | 34–5 | Edgardo Velazquez | TKO | 5 (8), 0:50 | Dec 20, 2025 | Auditorio Municipal, Tijuana, Mexico | |
| 38 | Loss | 33–5 | Xander Zayas | UD | 12 | Jul 26, 2025 | Madison Square Garden Theater, New York City, New York, U.S. | For vacant WBO light-middleweight title |
| 37 | Win | 33–4 | Charles Conwell | SD | 12 | Apr 19, 2025 | Frontwave Arena, Oceanside, California, U.S. | |
| 36 | Win | 32–4 | Kudratillo Abdukakhorov | UD | 10 | Dec 14, 2024 | Estadio Caliente, Tijuana, Mexico | |
| 35 | Win | 31–4 | Ilias Essaoudi | KO | 1 (10), 0:46 | Sep 20, 2024 | Desert Diamond Arena, Glendale, Arizona, U.S. | |
| 34 | Win | 30–4 | Roarke Knapp | KO | 3 (12), 1:05 | Jun 15, 2024 | Emperors Palace Kempton Park, South Africa | Won vacant IBO light-middleweight title |
| 33 | Win | 29–4 | Abraham Juarez Ramirez | KO | 1 (10), 2:39 | Feb 24, 2024 | Centro de Convenciones Siglo XXI, Merida, Yucatán, Mexico | |
| 32 | Win | 28–4 | Angel Cruz Johnson | UD | 10 | Oct 11, 2023 | Bávaro Convention Center, Punta Cana, Dominican Republic | Won vacant WBO Inter-Continental light-middleweight title |
| 31 | Win | 27–4 | Ricardo Banuelos Cernas | TKO | 2 (8), 2:36 | Jul 8, 2023 | Centro de Espectáculos del Recinto Ferial, Metepec, México, Mexico | |
| 30 | Win | 26–4 | Hector Andres Reyes | KO | 7 (8) | Jun 3, 2023 | Chihuahua, Chihuahua, Mexico | |
| 29 | Loss | 25–4 | Etoundi Michel William | SD | 10 | Jan 21, 2023 | Mexico City, Distrito Federal, Mexico | |
| 28 | Win | 25–3 | Jorge Páez Jr. | TKO | 4 (10), 0:10 | Oct 1, 2022 | Auditorio Municipal Fausto Gutiérrez Moreno, Tijuana, Mexico | |
| 27 | Win | 24–3 | Mauricio Gutierrez Castor | TKO | 5 (10), 2:45 | May 28, 2022 | La Casa de los Zonkeys, Tijuana, Mexico | |
| 26 | Win | 23–3 | Jesus Nunez Rodriguez | KO | 3 (8), 1:09 | Feb 19, 2022 | Bullring by the Sea, Tijuana, Mexico | |
| 25 | Win | 22–3 | Abraham Juarez Ramirez | UD | 6 | Nov 18, 2021 | Gimnasio TV Azteca, Mexico City, Distrito Federal, Mexico | |
| 24 | Win | 21–3 | Dubiel Sanchez | TKO | 10 (10), 1:37 | Aug 24, 2021 | La Casa de los Zonkeys, Tijuana, Mexico | |
| 23 | Win | 20–3 | Even Torres Saucedo | RTD | 8 (10), 3:00 | May 7, 2021 | Auditorio Benito Juarez, Los Mochis, Sinaloa, Mexico | |
| 22 | Win | 19–3 | Jose Bernardino Lozano | UD | 8 | Jan 16, 2021 | Grand Hotel, Tijuana, Mexico | |
| 21 | Loss | 18–3 | Carlos Ocampo | UD | 10 | Aug 15, 2020 | Gimnasio TV Azteca, Mexico City, Mexico | |
| 20 | Win | 18–2 | Joel Juarez Cota | TKO | 2 (6), 0:50 | Nov 30, 2019 | Arena La Paz, La Paz, Baja California Sur, Mexico | |
| 19 | Loss | 17–2 | Abraham Juarez Ramirez | SD | 8 | Aug 31, 2019 | Arena La Paz, La Paz, Baja California Sur, Mexico | |
| 18 | Win | 17–1 | Daniel Armando Valenzuela | TKO | 2 (8), 2:27 | Dec 22, 2018 | Auditorio Municipal Fausto Gutiérrez Moreno, Tijuana, Mexico | |
| 17 | Win | 16–1 | Ishwar Siqueiros | TKO | 2 (6), 1:19 | Nov 10, 2018 | Auditorio Municipal, Tijuana, Mexico | |
| 16 | Win | 15–1 | Jose Lopez Medina | RTD | 2 (8), 3:00 | Jun 16, 2018 | Gimnasio de Mexicali, Mexicali, Mexico | |
| 15 | Loss | 14–1 | Josue Obando | SD | 6 | Feb 17, 2018 | Domo del Parque San Rafael, Guadalajara, Jalisco, Mexico | |
| 14 | Win | 14–0 | Rodrigo Hernandez | TKO | 6 (8) | Oct 21, 2017 | Estadio Centenario, Cuernavaca, Morelos, Mexico | |
| 13 | Win | 13–0 | Agustin Lugo Rodriguez | UD | 8 | Aug 12, 2017 | Gimnasio Nuevo León Unido, Monterrey, Nuevo León, Mexico | |
| 12 | Win | 12–0 | Juan Angulo Gonzalez | TKO | 1 (4), 1:30 | Apr 29, 2017 | Gimnasio Manuel Bernardo Aguirre, Chihuahua, Chihuahua, Mexico | |
| 11 | Win | 11–0 | Jesus Ramon Perez | TKO | 7 (8), 2:57 | Mar 3, 2017 | Polideportivo Juan S. Millan, Culiacan, Sinaloa, Mexico | |
| 10 | Win | 10–0 | Francisco Anaya | TKO | 2 (8), 2:31 | Feb 18, 2017 | Gimnasio Municipal, Guaymas, Sonora, Mexico | |
| 9 | Win | 9–0 | Ivan Chavela Resendiz | KO | 2 (?) | Dec 3, 2016 | Polideportivo Centenario, Los Mochis, Mexico | |
| 8 | Win | 8–0 | Juan Lopez | TKO | 5 (8), 2:24 | Oct 22, 2016 | Auditorio Municipal Fausto Gutiérrez Moreno, Tijuana, Mexico | |
| 7 | Win | 7–0 | Raul Ivan Gutierrez | RTD | 4 (8), 3:00 | Aug 13, 2016 | Baja California Center, Rosarito Beach, Mexico | |
| 6 | Win | 6–0 | Jorge Babuca Watanabe | TKO | 2 (8), 1:41 | Jun 18, 2016 | Auditorio Municipal Fausto Gutiérrez Moreno, Tijuana, Mexico | |
| 5 | Win | 5–0 | Israel Villela | TKO | 6 (6), 2:36 | Mar 12, 2016 | Poliforum Zamna, Mérida, México | |
| 4 | Win | 4–0 | Luis Juan Hernandez | KO | 3 (6), 2:02 | Feb 6, 2016 | Gimnasio El Maneadero, Ensenada, Mexico | |
| 3 | Win | 3–0 | Jorge Babuca Watanabe | UD | 4 | May 29, 2015 | Gimnacio Municipal de Box, Nogales, Sonora, Mexico | |
| 2 | Win | 2–0 | Carlos Bacasegua Luzania | KO | ? (?) | Jun 13, 2014 | Salon Forum, Los Mochis, Sinaloa, Mexico | |
| 1 | Win | 1–0 | Marco Antonio Urrea | RTD | 2 (4), 3:00 | Aug 30, 2013 | Arenita Forum, Los Mochis, Sinaloa, Mexico | |
