= Ermal Hadribeaj =

Albanian boxer (born 1993)

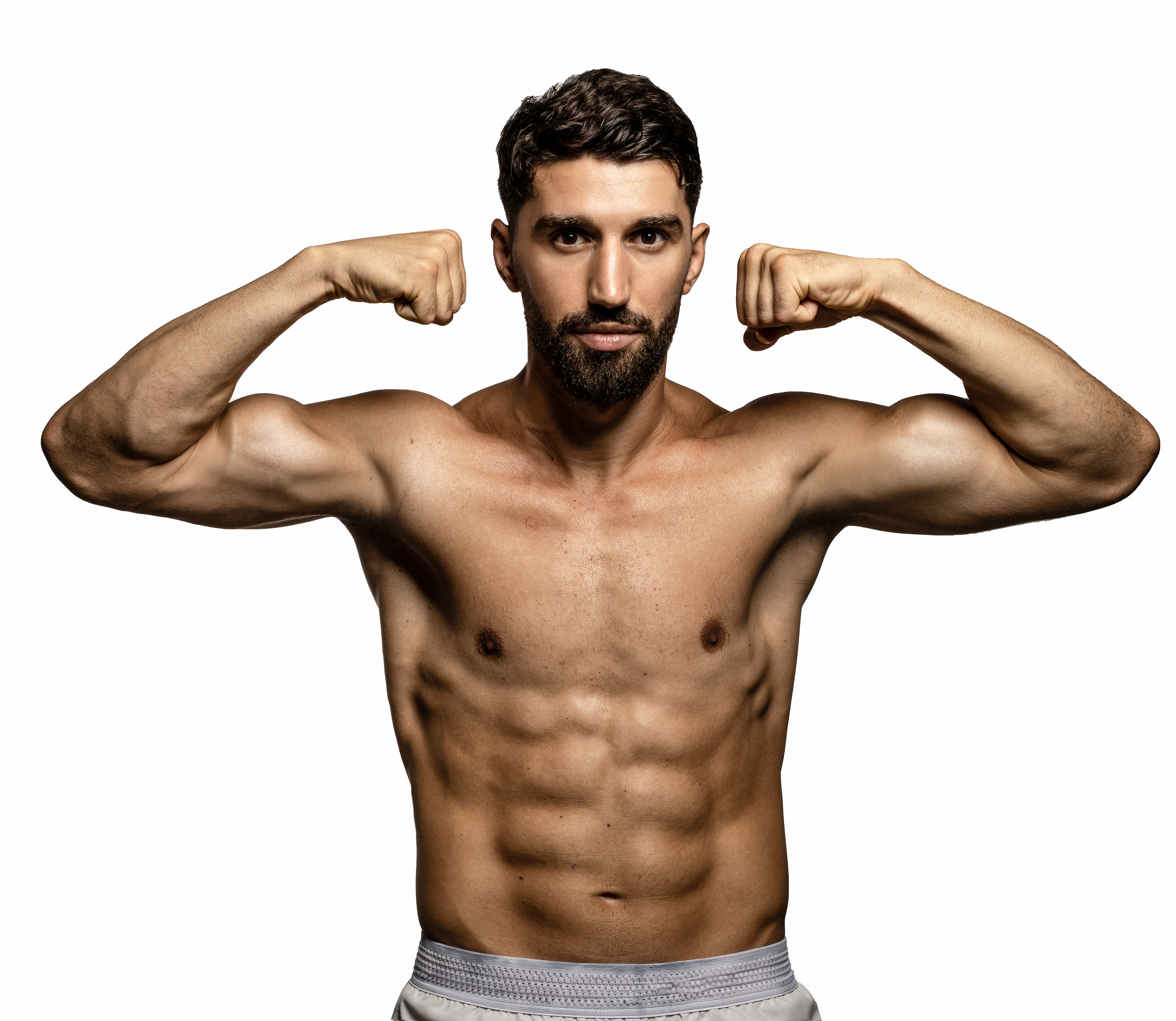

Personal information
- Nickname: The Albanian Sniper
- Nationality: Albanian
- Born: December 12, 1993 (age 32) Tirana, Albania
- Height: 5 ft 10 in (178 cm)
- Weight: Super Welterweight

Boxing career
- Stance: Southpaw

Boxing record
- Total fights: 26
- Wins: 23
- Win by KO: 8
- Losses: 1
- Draws: 1
- No contests: 1

Ermal Hadribeaj (born December 12, 1993) is an Albanian professional boxer and former professional mixed martial artist.

== Boxing career ==
=== Early career ===
Hadribeaj made his professional boxing debut on September 6, 2019. He is trained and managed by Donato De Martiis. Under De Martiis’ guidance, Hadribeaj compiled an undefeated record during the early stages of his professional career while competing primarily in the United States.

On September 25, 2021, Hadribeaj captured his first professional championship by defeating Thodoris Ritzakis via unanimous decision to win the WBC Mediterranean super welterweight title."Glen "The Road Warrior" Johnson Presents a Night of Boxing in Miami, Florida" (Press release). PR Newswire.

On February 19, 2022, Hadribeaj defeated Daniel Baiz by unanimous decision to win the North American Boxing Federation (NABF) super welterweight title. He successfully defended the title against Sidney da Rosa Manuel on May 13, 2022, winning by unanimous decision.

=== WBC International champion ===
On November 12, 2022, Hadribeaj defeated Daniel Buciuc by unanimous decision to win the vacant WBC International super welterweight title."Ermal Hadribeaj reveals his world title 'dream' as a rising contender in an exciting new era for Albanian boxing". Sky Sports.

He made the first defense of the championship on May 19, 2023, defeating Leonardo Di Stefano Ruiz by unanimous decision. Hadribeaj retained the title again on July 17, 2023, with another unanimous decision victory over Sumbu Nsasi."WBC International Super Welterweight Champion Ermal Hadribeaj Retained His Belt". WBC International Championships.

On November 17, 2023, Hadribeaj defended the WBC International title against former IBF light middleweight world champion Carlos Molina, winning by technical knockout in the ninth round. The victory represented one of the most notable wins of his professional career and further improved his standing in the WBC super welterweight rankings.

During 2024, Hadribeaj continued his undefeated run with successful title defenses against Bohdan Shtonda, Younes Zarraa and Eddy Colmenares. The victories extended his reign as WBC International champion and established him among the leading contenders in the WBC super welterweight division.

=== WBC Silver champion and world title contention ===
On November 23, 2025, Hadribeaj defeated Plácido Ramírez by unanimous decision, preserving his undefeated record and maintaining his position among the WBC's highest-ranked contenders.

In early 2026, the World Boxing Council ordered a final eliminator between Hadribeaj and undefeated French boxer Bakary Samaké to determine the mandatory challenger for the WBC super welterweight world championship. The bout was originally scheduled to take place in Paris, France, but was postponed following the cancellation of the event.

The contest was rescheduled for May 23, 2026, at the Willy-Jürissen-Halle in Oberhausen, Germany. Hadribeaj defeated Samaké by unanimous decision over twelve rounds, handing the French boxer the first defeat of his professional career. With the victory, Hadribeaj captured the WBC Silver super welterweight title and became the mandatory challenger for the WBC super welterweight world championship.

The victory over Samaké was widely regarded as the most significant win of Hadribeaj's professional career, elevating him into world title contention after remaining undefeated through his rise in the professional ranks.

== Mixed Martial Arts career ==
Hadribeaj competed in MMA from 2016 to 2019. He recorded a 4–3 record as an amateur and a 4–1 record as a professional. Hadribeaj represented Team Albania at the 2016 IMMAF European Open Championship going 1–1, the 2017 IMMAF European Open Championship going 0–1 and the 2017 IMMAF World Championships going 3–1 losing in the semi-finals.

== Professional Mixed martial arts record ==
Professional record breakdown
5 matches	4 wins	1 loss
By knockout	4	0
By decision	0	1

Res.	Record	Opponent	Method	Event	Date	Round	Time	Location	Notes
Win	4–1	Ryan McIntosh	TKO (Submission to body kick)	WXC 80 WARRIOR WEDNESDAY 5	July 31, 2019	1	3:12	Southgate, Michigan, United States	
Win	3–1	Lou Radecki	TKO (punches)	TRIPLE X CAGEFIGHTING LEGENDS 79	September 22, 2018	2	2:23	Livonia, Michigan, United States	
Win	2–1	Antoine Gray	TKO (punches)	TRIPLE X CAGEFIGHTING LEGENDS 12	April 14, 2018	1	2:25	Livonia, Michigan, United States	
Win	1–1	Omar Lila	KO (Head Kick)	AGC 3 ALBANIAN GLADIATOR CHAMPIONSHIP 3	April 20, 2016	1	3:43	Tirana, Albania	
Loss	0–1	Panagiotis Stroumpoulis	Unanimous Decision	Cage Survivor: Fight Nightmare King Pyrros	February 14, 2016	3	5:00	Ioannina, Greece	Lightweight debut.

== Professional boxing record ==
26 fights	23 wins	1 loss
By knockout	8	1
By decision	15	0
Draws	1	
No contests	1	

No.	Result	Record	Opponent	Type	Round, time	Date	Location	Notes
26	Loss	23–1–1 (1)	Sebastian Fundora	KO	12 (12), 2:59	17 Oct 2026	The Cosmopolitan, Paradise, Nevada, U.S.	For WBC light middleweight title
25	Win	23–0–1 (1)	Bakary Samake	UD	12	23 May 2026	Oberhausen, Nordrhein-Westfalen, Germany	Won WBC Silver light middleweight title
24	Win	22–0–1 (1)	Placido Ramirez	UD	10	23 Nov 2025	Olympic Park “Feti Borova”, Tirana, Albania	Retained WBC International light middleweight title
23	Win	21–0–1 (1)	Ilhami Aydemir	TKO	8 (10), 1:22	23 May 2025	Zagreb, Croatia	Retained WBC International light middleweight title
22	Win	20–0–1 (1)	Eddy Colmenares	MD	10	12 Dec 2024	Grand Elysée, Rotherbaum, Germany	Retained WBC International light middleweight title
21	Win	19–0–1 (1)	Younes Zarraa	UD	10	21 Jun 2024	Motorworld, Cologne, Germany	Retained WBC International light middleweight title
20	Win	18–0–1 (1)	Bohdan Shtonda	UD	10	27 Jan 2024	Motorworld, Cologne, Germany	Retained WBC International light middleweight title
19	Win	17–0–1 (1)	Carlos Molina	TKO	9 (10), 2:16	17 Nov 2023	Humo Arena, Tashkent, Uzbekistan	Retained WBC International light middleweight title
18	Win	16–0–1 (1)	Sumbu Nsasi	UD	10	17 Jul 2023	Square Mother Tereza, Tirana, Albania	Retained WBC International light middleweight title
17	Win	15–0–1 (1)	Leonardo di Stefano Ruiz	UD	10	19 May 2023	The Renaissance Conference Center, Richmond, Virginia, U.S.	Retained WBC International light middleweight title
16	Win	14–0–1 (1)	Daniel Buciuc	UD	10	12 Nov 2022	Yume Nightclub, Dubai, UAE	Won Vacant WBC International light middleweight title
15	NC	13–0–1 (1)	Charles Stanford	UD	8	1 Jul 2022	Motor City Casino, Detroit, Michigan, U.S.	Originally a win for Hadribeaj
14	Win	13–0–1	Sidney da Rosa Manuel	UD	8	13 May 2022	Motor City Casino, Detroit, Michigan, U.S.	Defended North American Boxing Federation Junior Super Welterweight Title
13	Win	12–0–1	Daniel Baiz	UD	8	19 Feb 2022	Sports Event Center, Rock Hill, South Carolina, U.S.	Won Vacant North American Boxing Federation Junior Super Welterweight Title
12	Win	11–0–1	Manny Woods	TKO	5 (8), 0:42	6 Nov 2021	Miami Airport Convention Center, Miami, Florida, U.S.	
11	Win	10–0–1	Thodoris Ritzakis	UD	10	25 Sep 2021	Bonaventure Resort Spa, Weston, Florida, U.S.	Won WBC Mediterranean light middleweight title
10	Win	9–0–1	Javier Garcia	TKO	4 (8), 2:59	10 Jul 2021	Miami Airport Convention Center, Miami, Florida, U.S.	
9	Win	8–0–1	Brandon Baue	TKO	6 (8), 3:00	20 Mar 2021	Airport Hilton, Miami, Florida, U.S.	
8	Win	7–0–1	Larry Smith	TKO	3 (8), 2:22	23 Jan 2021	Miramar Regional Park Amphitheater, Miramar, Florida, U.S.	
7	Win	6–0–1	Kynndale Prather	KO	3 (6), 3:00	12 Dec 2020	Airport Hilton, Miami, Florida, U.S.	
6	Win	5–0–1	Dylan Carlson	UD	6	7 Nov 2020	Bonita Springs Elks Lodge, Bonita Springs, Florida, U.S.	
5	Win	4–0–1	Christian Rivera	UD	6	22 Aug 2020	Bonita Springs Elks Lodge, Bonita Springs, Florida, U.S.	
4	Win	3–0–1	Donyeh Thomas Cosby	KO	2 (6), 2:12	8 Feb 2020	Hard Rock Hotel, Daytona Beach, Florida, U.S.	
3	Draw	2–0–1	Javonn Davis	PTS	4	21 Dec 2019	Miami-Dade County Fair & Expo, Miami, Florida, U.S.	
2	Win	2–0	Eric Rodriquez	MD	4	1 Nov 2019	Hard Rock Hotel, Daytona Beach, Florida, U.S.	
1	Win	1–0	Darius Bagley	UD	4	6 Sep 2019	The Sugar Mill, New Orleans, Louisiana, U.S.	
