= Paul Kroll =

American boxer (born 1995)

Personal information
- Other names: The Punisher
- Born: 10 July 1995 (age 31) Philadelphia, Pennsylvania, U.S.
- Height: 5 ft 9 in (175 cm)

Boxing career
- Weight class: Welterweight, Super-welterweight
- Reach: 70 in (178 cm)
- Stance: Orthodox

Boxing record
- Total fights: 15
- Wins: 12
- Win by KO: 8
- Losses: 2
- Draws: 1

Paul Kroll (born July 10, 1995) is an American professional boxer. As an amateur he represented the United States internationally.

== Amateur career ==
Kroll began boxing aged 15. In December 2015, he earned a place on the United States Olympic team by winning the national trials in the welterweight division. However, he failed to make it to the Games after losing in the international qualifiers.

== Professional career ==
After turning professional in 2018, Kroll made his debut in the paid ranks with a first round stoppage win over DeAngelo Alcorn at SugarHouse Casino in Philadelphia, Pennsylvania, on August 10 that year.

Having won his first seven pro-fights, Kroll defeated Luke Santamaria in his first 10-round bout at Microsoft Theater in Los Angeles, California, on October 3, 2020.

Still undefeated after 14 professional contests, he faced his former United States teammate Charles Conwell at The Theater at Virgin Hotels in Las Vegas, Nevada, on August 1, 2026. Kroll was knocked to the canvas in the third round and, although he recovered to continue the fight, he went on to lose via technical knockout in the ninth round.

== Personal life ==
Kroll was charged with attempted murder following an incident during which gunshots were fired on August 20, 2016. He eventually pleaded guilty to a lesser charge as he did not fire a gun and was placed under house arrest for 18 months.
