= Patrick Day =

American boxer (1992–2019)

Personal information
- Nationality: American
- Born: August 9, 1992 Freeport, New York, U.S.
- Died: October 16, 2019 (aged 27) Chicago, Illinois, U.S.
- Height: 5 ft 9 in (175 cm)
- Weight: Light middleweight

Boxing career
- Reach: 74 in (188 cm)
- Stance: Orthodox

Boxing record
- Total fights: 22
- Wins: 17
- Win by KO: 6
- Losses: 4
- Draws: 1

Patrick Day (August 9, 1992 – October 16, 2019) was an American professional boxer. He died from brain trauma sustained in a knockout loss against Charles Conwell.

== Early life and education ==
Day was born to Haitian immigrants in Freeport, New York, and was the youngest of four sons. His father was a doctor who used to box as a child, while his mother, Lyssa, was a translator at the United Nations. During his professional boxing career, he earned an associate degree in nutrition from Nassau Community College, and a bachelor's degree in health and wellness from Kaplan University.

== Career ==
Day started boxing in 2006 under the guidance of former firefighter and boxing trainer Joe Higgins. In 2012, he won the New York Golden Gloves tournament. His amateur record was 75–5, including two national amateur championships. He was recognized as the number-one ranked amateur boxer in the United States in the 152-pound division, and served as a 2012 United States Olympic team alternate.

Day rose to be a top-10 ranked light middleweight for the WBC and IBF. He also captured the regional WBC Continental Americas light middleweight title. Day won 17 of his 22 professional fights, with four defeats and one draw.

== Death ==
Day suffered a traumatic brain injury during a knockout loss to Charles Conwell in a USBA super welterweight title bout on October 12, 2019, and died four days later.

Boxing announcer Michael Buffer described Day as a "wonderful young man" and that "everyone in the boxing community is crushed", while WBC president Mauricio Sulaiman said boxing had lost a "brave, kind and wonderful friend". Conwell posted an open letter online that expressed his sorrow and regret.

== Professional boxing record ==
22 fights	17 wins	4 losses
By knockout	6	2
By decision	11	2
Draws	1	

No.	Result	Record	Opponent	Type	Round(s), time	Date	Age	Location	Notes
22	Loss	17–4–1	Charles Conwell	KO	10 (10), 1:46	Oct 12, 2019	27 years, 64 days	Wintrust Arena, Chicago, Illinois, U.S.	For IBF-USBA super welterweight title; Day died of injuries sustained in the fight.
21	Loss	17–3–1	Carlos Adames	UD	10	Jun 28, 2019	26 years, 323 days	Pechanga Resort & Casino, Temecula, California, U.S.	For NABF and WBO NBAO super welterweight titles
20	Win	17–2–1	Ismail Iliev	UD	10	Feb 2, 2019	26 years, 177 days	The Ford Center at The Star, Frisco, California, U.S.	Retained WBC Continental Americas super welterweight title
19	Win	16–2–1	Elvin Ayala	UD	10	Oct 27, 2018	26 years, 79 days	Madison Square Garden Theater, New York City, New York, U.S.	Retained WBC Continental Americas super welterweight title
18	Win	15–2–1	Kyrone Davis	UD	10	Mar 3, 2018	25 years, 206 days	Barclays Center, New York City, New York, U.S.	Retained WBC Continental Americas super welterweight title
17	Win	14–2–1	Eric Walker	UD	10	Jul 15, 2017	24 years, 340 days	Mohegan Sun Casino, Uncasville, Connecticut, U.S.	Won WBC Continental Americas super welterweight title
16	Win	13–2–1	Virgilijus Stapulionis	UD	10	Nov 26, 2016	24 years, 109 days	Mohegan Sun Casino, Uncasville, Connecticut, U.S.	
15	Win	12–2–1	Courtney Pennington	UD	6	Apr 23, 2016	23 years, 258 days	Paramount Theatre, Huntington, New York, U.S.	
14	Loss	11–2–1	Carlos Garcia Hernandez	TKO	1 (8), 1:18	Nov 20, 2015	23 years, 103 days	Aviator Sports Complex, New York City, New York, U.S.	
13	Win	11–1–1	Lenwood Dozier	UD	8	Jul 8, 2015	22 years, 333 days	B.B. King Blues Club & Grill, New York City, New York, U.S.	
12	Win	10–1–1	Colby Courter	TKO	1 (6), 2:25	Apr 10, 2015	22 years, 244 days	Aviator Sports Complex, New York City, New York, U.S.	
11	Loss	9–1–1	Alantez Fox	MD	8	Jan 9, 2015	22 years, 153 days	Morongo Casino Resort & Spa, Cabazon, California, U.S.	
10	Win	9–0–1	Felipe Reyes	UD	6	Oct 15, 2014	22 years, 67 days	B.B. King Blues Club & Grill, New York City, New York, U.S.	
9	Win	8–0–1	Brad Jackson	TKO	2 (6), 0:15	Jul 23, 2014	21 years, 348 days	B.B. King Blues Club & Grill, New York City, New York, U.S.	
8	Win	7–0–1	Duane King	KO	1 (6), 0:39	Mar 21, 2014	21 years, 224 days	Aviator Sports Complex, New York City, New York, U.S.	
7	Win	6–0–1	Guillermo Ibarra	TKO	1 (6), 1:31	Jan 31, 2014	21 years, 175 days	Richard J. Codey Arena, West Orange, New Jersey, U.S.	
6	Draw	5–0–1	Urmat Ryskeldiev	MD	6	Nov 9, 2013	21 years, 92 days	Aviator Sports Complex, New York City, New York, U.S.	
5	Win	5–0	Donald Ward	UD	6	Aug 14, 2013	21 years, 5 days	B.B. King Blues Club & Grill, New York City, New York, U.S.	
4	Win	4–0	Carl Hill	UD	4	Jun 29, 2013	20 years, 324 days	Resorts World Casino, New York City, New York, U.S.	
3	Win	3–0	Yusmani Abreu	UD	4	Apr 4, 2013	20 years, 238 days	Roseland Ballroom, New York City, New York, U.S.	
2	Win	2–0	Dominique Foster	TKO	1 (4), 3:00	Feb 21, 2013	20 years, 196 days	Roseland Ballroom, New York City, New York, U.S.	
1	Win	1–0	Zachariah Kelley	TKO	1 (4), 0:59	Jan 23, 2013	20 years, 167 days	B.B. King Blues Club & Grill, New York City, New York, U.S.	

== See also ==
- List of deaths due to injuries sustained in boxing
