= Bakary Samake =

French boxer (born 2002)

Personal information
- Nationality: French
- Born: June 29, 2003 (age 23) Aubervilliers, France
- Height: 5 ft 11 in (180 cm)
- Weight: Light middleweight

Boxing career
- Stance: Orthodox

Boxing record
- Total fights: 21
- Wins: 20
- Win by KO: 11
- Losses: 1

Bakary Samake (born June 29, 2003) is a French professional boxer who competes in the light-middleweight division.

== Early life ==
Samake was born in Aubervilliers to boxing promoter and former basketball player Issa Samake. He began taking part in boxing at the age of 8

== Amateur career ==
Samake dominated the local scene and turned pro at the age of just 17. His amateur record was 25 win 5 losses

== Professional career ==
=== Early career ===
Samake made his debut on 5 June 2021, and spent the initial two years of his professional career competing primarily in France, along with some bouts in Luxembourg and Belgium. By the end of 2023, he had established a record of 14 wins and no losses, with 8 of those victories achieved by stoppage.

The first big test of Samake's pro career came against fellow Frenchmen Ahmed El Mousaoui at the Zenith de Paris-la Villette. While El Mousaoui had his moments Samake proved he his potential by the stronger and more skilful fighter to win a unanimous decision.

Samake faced the tough Julio Álamos in his next fight. In what was a closely fought contest Samake dealt after he knocked Álamos down a few seconds before the final bell to win on points

Samake claimed the first title of his pro career when he defeated Aussie Wade Ryan by seventh round stoppage to win the WBC Silver super welterweight title. After forcing Ryan into the corner and landing without reply the Ryan corner threw in the flag.

=== Signing with Queensberry Promotions ===
On 4 December 2025, he signed a co-promotional deal with Hall of Fame promoter Frank Warren and his Queensberry Promotions, alongside Samake Promotions. His first fight under the promotion was scheduled for 25 April 2026 at the Adidas Arena in Paris against Albanian Ermal Hadribeaj (22–0–1, 8 KOs), in a WBC title eliminator. The entire event was cancelled after headliner Lawrence Okolie tested positive for a banned substance. As Queensberry could not proceed with the fight, the WBC ordered a purse bid on 29 April. Arena Box Promotions, Hadribeaj’s promoter, won with a bid of $339,817, taking control of the fight. The bout was then rescheduled to take place on 23 May at the Willy-Jürissen-Halle in Oberhausen, Germany. Samake lost by unanimous decision to suffer the first defeat of his professional career. Fighting back in his native France on 14 November 2026, Samake returned to winning ways defeating Angolan boxer Uisma Lima via unanimous decision over 12 rounds. There was 4,000 fans in attendance at the "Marcel Cerdan" Arena of Levallois-Perret, in the close suburbs of Paris. Lima was dropped in the tenth round. The scorecards read 118–109, 116–111 and 114–113, all for Samake.

== Professional boxing record ==
21 fights	20 wins	1 loss
By knockout	11	0
By decision	9	1

No.	Result	Record	Opponent	Type	Round, time	Date	Location	Notes
21	Win	20–1	(Angola) Uisma Lima	UD	12	14 Nov 2026	Palais des Sports Marcel-Cerdan, Levallois-Perret, France	Won vacant WBC Silver light-middleweight title
20	Loss	19–1	(Albania) Ermal Hadribeaj	UD	12	May 23, 2026	Oberhausen, Nordrhein-Westfalen, Germany	Lost WBC Silver light-middleweight title
19	Win	19–0	(Venezuela) Alejandro Ortiz	KO	5 (10)	25 Oct 2025	Palais des Sports Marcel-Cerdan, Levallois-Perret, France	
18	Win	18-0	(South Africa) Roarke Knapp	KO	8 (12)	18 Avr 2025	Paris La Défense Arena, Paris, France	Retained WBC Silver light-middleweight title
17	Win	17–0	(Australia) Wade Ryan	TKO	7 (12)	23 Nov 2024	Westfield, forum des halles, Paris, France	Won vacant WBC Silver light-middleweight title
16	Win	16–0	(Chile) Julio Álamos	UD	10	13 Jun 2024	Zenith de Paris-La Villette, Paris XIX, Paris, France	
15	Win	15–0	(France) Ahmed El Mousaoui	UD	10	22 Feb 2024	Zenith de Paris-La Villette, Paris XIX, Paris, France	
14	Win	14–0	(Peru) Jairo Moran	TKO	1 (8)	2 Dec 2023	Palais des Sports, Marseille, Bouches-du-Rhône, France	
13	Win	13–0	(Mexico) Mariel Agundez Bustamante	UD	10	22 Jun 2023	Espace Hoche, Paris VIII, Paris, France	Retained IBF Youth light-middleweight title
12	Win	12–0	(Colombia) Jairo Delgado	TKO	5 (8)	28 May 2023	Palais des Sports Robert Oubron, Creteil, Val-de-Marne, France	
11	Win	11–0	(Argentina) Lucas Brian Ariel Bastida	UD	10	18 Mar 2023	L'arena, Gagny, Seine-Saint-Denis, France	Won vacant IBF Youth light-middleweight title
10	Win	10–0	(Thailand) Apsit Sangmuang	TKO	3 (8)	15 Aug 2022	Palais des Festivals, Cannes, Alpes-Maritimes, France	
9	Win	9–0	(Nicaragua) Robin Zamora	RTD	4 (10)	7 Jun 2022	Hotel Westin, Paris I, Paris, France	Won vacant IBO Mediterranean light-middleweight title
8	Win	8–0	(Nicaragua) Pablo Mendoza	UD	8	24 Mar 2022	Hotel Intercontinental, Paris, Paris, France	
7	Win	7–0	(Tunisia) Houcine Moulahi	UD	8	18 Dec 2021	Gymnase de la Fighting academie, Villers sur mer, Calvados, France	
6	Win	6–0	(Hungary) Gyorgy Mizsei	KO	2 (10), 2:40	13 Nov 2021	Dudelange, Luxembourg	Won vacant Luxembourg light-middleweight title
5	Win	5–0	(Italy) Christian Mazzon	UD	6	25 Sep 2021	Gymnase Jolliot-Curie, Drancy, Seine-Saint-Denis, France	
4	Win	4–0	(France) Karim Menasria	KO	1 (4)	3 Jul 2021	Gymnase Jolliot-Curie, Drancy, Seine-Saint-Denis, France	
3	Win	3–0	(Serbia) Bozidar Ilic	UD	4	26 Jun 2021	alle du Bouvy, La Louviere, Hainaut, Belgium	
2	Win	2–0	(Slovakia) Ambroz Horvath	KO	1 (4)	12 Jun 2021	Stade de Football, Vise, Liege, Belgium	
1	Win	1–0	(Poland) Lukasz Rudnik	KO	1 (4)	5 Jun 2021	Centre Sportif du LNBD annexe Alliance, Dudelange, Luxembourg	
