= Charles Conwell =

American boxer (born 1997)

Personal information
- Born: Charles Albert Shone Conwell; November 2, 1997 (age 28) Detroit, Michigan, U.S.
- Height: 5 ft 9 in (175 cm)
- Weight: Light middleweight

Boxing career
- Stance: Orthodox

Boxing record
- Total fights: 23
- Wins: 22
- Win by KO: 17
- Losses: 1

Charles Albert Shone Conwell (born November 2, 1997) is an American professional boxer. As an amateur he competed in the men's middleweight event at the 2016 Summer Olympics.

== Professional career ==
On October 12, 2019, Conwell fought Patrick Day. In what was supposed to be a competitive fight, Conwell managed to get the better of Day, dropping him three times in rounds four, eight and ten. The third knockdown was the most devastating out of all, with Conwell catching his opponent with a big right hand behind the ear, followed by a sweeping left hook that immediately sent Day to the canvas in brutal fashion. Day was reported to be unconscious and suffered a seizure on the way to the hospital. A few days after, it was announced that Patrick Day had succumbed to his injuries and died.

In his next fight, Conwell defeated Ramses Agaton in dominant fashion, forcing the referee to stop the fight after the end of the fourth round. After taking a lot of punishment from the start, Agaton didn't look good, and after consulting the ringside physician the referee stopped the fight and Conwell got the victory.

In his next fight, Conwell squared off against Wendy Toussaint. Conwell boxed well in the opening rounds. In round seven, he hurt his hand which gave him a lot of pain, but two rounds after it would be that same hand that would end the fight. Conwell landed a vicious uppercut on Toussaint, breaking his nose and forcing him to forfeit.

In April 2021, Conwell had to withdraw from his fight with Ivan Golub reportedly from a hand injury. Conwell later told ESPN that he faked the hand injury on allegedly his managers advice.

Conwell was scheduled to face Nathaniel Gallimore on April 20, 2024 in Brooklyn, NY. He won the fight via sixth-round TKO.

Conwell was scheduled to face Khiary Gray in Las Vegas on August 10, 2024. Conwell won the fight by second-round TKO.

Conwell was scheduled to face Gerardo Vergara in Ontario, California on December 14, 2024. Conwell won the fight via stoppage in the seventh round.

Conwell faced Jorge Garcia Perez on April 19, 2025 in Oceanside, California. He lost by split decision.

Conwell got back to winning ways in his next fight, defeating Paul Kroll via technical knockout in the ninth round at The Theater at Virgin Hotels in Las Vegas, Nevada, on August 1, 2026.

== Professional boxing record ==
23 fights	22 wins	1 loss
By knockout	17	0
By decision	5	1

No.	Result	Record	Opponent	Type	Round, time	Date	Location	Notes
23	Win	22–1	Paul Kroll	TKO	9 (10), 2:38	Aug 1, 2026	The Theater at Virgin Hotels, Las Vegas, Nevada, U.S.	
22	Loss	21–1	Jorge Garcia Perez	SD	12	Apr 19, 2025	Frontwave Arena, Oceanside, California, U.S.	
21	Win	21–0	Gerardo Luis Vergara	KO	7 (10), 2:51	Dec 14, 2024	Toyota Arena, Ontario, California, U.S.	
20	Win	20–0	Khiary Gray	KO	2 (10), 2:32	Aug 10, 2024	Michelob Ultra Arena, Las Vegas, Nevada, U.S.	
19	Win	19–0	Nathaniel Gallimore	TKO	6 (10), 0:52	Apr 20, 2024	Barclays Center, Brooklyn, New York, U.S.	
18	Win	18–0	Juan Carlos Abreu	MD	10	Nov 26, 2022	Dignity Health Sports Park, Carson, California, U.S.	
17	Win	17–0	Abraham Juarez Ramirez	KO	3 (10) 1:13	Jun 2, 2022	Montreal Casino, Montreal, Quebec, Canada	
16	Win	16–0	Juan Carlos Rubio	TKO	3 (10) 2:49	Aug 29, 2021	Rocket Mortgage FieldHouse, Cleveland, Ohio, U.S.	Retained IBF-USBA and WBC-USNBC junior middleweight titles
15	Win	15–0	Silverio Ortiz	UD	8	Jun 26, 2021	Boyd County Community Center, Ashland, Kentucky, U.S.	
14	Win	14–0	Madiyar Ashkeyev	RTD	9 (10), 3:00	Dec 17, 2020	Wild Card Boxing, Los Angeles, California, U.S.	Retained IBF-USBA junior middleweight title; Won WBC-USNBC junior middleweight title
13	Win	13–0	Wendy Toussaint	KO	9 (10), 2:42	Oct 7, 2020	Mohegan Sun Arena, Uncasville, Connecticut, U.S.	Retained IBF-USBA junior middleweight title
12	Win	12–0	Ramses Agaton	RTD	4 (8), 3:00	Feb 8, 2020	Hammond Civic Center, Hammond, Indiana, U.S.	
11	Win	11–0	Patrick Day	KO	10 (10), 1:46	Oct 12, 2019	Wintrust Arena, Chicago, Illinois, U.S.	Retained IBF-USBA junior middleweight title; Day died of injuries sustained in the fight
10	Win	10–0	Courtney Pennington	UD	10	Jun 8, 2019	Madison Square Garden, New York City, New York, U.S.	Won vacant IBF-USBA junior middleweight title
9	Win	9–0	Manny Woods	RTD	3 (8), 3:00	Dec 22, 2018	PromoWest Pavilion, Columbus, Ohio, U.S.	
8	Win	8–0	Travis Scott	TKO	2 (6), 1:48	Jul 14, 2018	Lakefront Arena, New Orleans, Louisiana, U.S.	
7	Win	7–0	Juan Jesus Rivera Garces	UD	6	Mar 9, 2018	Deadwood Mountain Grand, Deadwood, South Dakota, U.S.	
6	Win	6–0	Roque Zapata	UD	6	Nov 10, 2017	Masonic Temple & Performing Arts Center, Cleveland, Ohio, U.S.	
5	Win	5–0	Rey Trujillo	TKO	3 (4), 0:32	Aug 25, 2017	Buffalo Run Casino, Miami, Oklahoma, U.S.	
4	Win	4–0	Rick Graham	TKO	2 (6), 2:33	Jul 14, 2017	Buffalo Run Casino, Miami, Oklahoma, U.S.	
3	Win	3–0	Jeffrey Wright	TKO	2 (6), 0:57	Jun 9, 2017	Turning Stone Resort Casino, Verona, New York, U.S.	
2	Win	2–0	Jeff Souffrant	TKO	1 (6), 2:43	May 18, 2017	The Theater at Madison Square Garden, New York City, New York, U.S.	
1	Win	1–0	Jeremiah Page	TKO	1 (4), 0:41	Apr 21, 2017	Buffalo Run Casino, Miami, Oklahoma, U.S.	
