= Ivan Golub =

Ukrainian boxer

Personal information
- Nickname: The Volk
- Born: January 10, 1989 (age 37) Horlivka, Ukraine
- Height: 1.8 m (5 ft 11 in)
- Weight: Welterweight

Boxing career
- Reach: 173 cm (68 in)
- Stance: Southpaw

Boxing record
- Total fights: 22
- Wins: 21
- Win by KO: 16
- Losses: 1
Medal record
Men's amateur boxing
Representing Ukraine
Youth World Championships
Bronze medal – third place	2006 Agadir	Middleweight
World Championships
Bronze medal – third place	2009 Milan	Middleweight

Ivan Golub (born January 10, 1989) is a Ukrainian professional boxer. As an amateur he competed with the team of Ukraine alongside Oleksandr Usyk, Vasyl Lomachenko, and Oleksandr Gvozdyk.

He currently fights in the Welterweight Division, ranks as the 24th-best Welterweight in the world, and is the #1 ranked Ukrainian in the Welterweight division by BoxRec. Golub has many wins against stars like Eric Walker and Lanardo Tyner.

Golub has been nicknamed “The Volk,” as the Russian translation translates into Wolf. Golub has a knockout-win ratio of 76%, and 24% of his wins have come by decision.

== Amateur career ==
As an amateur, Golub had many outstanding results. He had a record of 270–32 before he transitioned into his professional career. He was a five-time Ukrainian National Champion in his amateur career.

Golub has competed in significant amateur events, including the Junior World Championships in 2006 and the World Championships in 2009. In these two events, Golub successfully secured the bronze medal in both events.

In 2012, Golub fought in the World Series of Boxing tournament. This league was organized by the AIBA. He competed in the middleweight division, winning all five bouts.

== Professional career ==
=== Early career ===
Golub made his professional debut in mid-2014, at the age of 25. He signed a promotional deal with DiBella Entertainment which is run by Lou DiBella, fighting out of Brooklyn. Golub made his debut fighting in the Middleweight division.

On June 27, 2014, Golub successfully defeated opponent Javon Wright in his first pro bout via unanimous decision. Almost four months later, Golub won his second bout via a first-round knockout against American fighter Kirk Huff. Finally, in late 2014, Golub had two more fights, winning both via knockout defeating Tyson Harrison and Josh Williams.

=== Golub vs. Clark ===
On 30 June 2017, he faced Jamontay Clark at Huntington Center, Toledo. Clark came out victorious by unanimous decision in their bout, with two judges scoring the bout 75-77, 75-77, and the third judge scoring it 73-79, all in favor of Clark.

This bout was on the main card of the Robert Easter Jr. vs. Denis Shafikov event. Two questionable decisions on this card included Denis Shafikov and Golub.

The bout between Golub and Clark was set for eight rounds, with each round being 3 minutes. Both fighters before the bout had undefeated records, with Golub coming in at 13-0-0 and Clark at 11-0-0.

=== Golub vs Conwell ===
He was scheduled to fight Charles Conwell on April 8, 2021, in a ten-round main event fight. Conwell had to withdraw from the fight reportedly from a hand injury.

=== Golub vs Walker ===
On 3 August 2021, Golub fought against Eric Walker for the IBF-USBA Welterweight Title at the Hulu Theater, New York. Despite the slow start in the first two rounds, the southpaw from Ukraine dominated the rest of the fight knocking down Walker twice in the fight in rounds five and nine. Golub won the fight by unanimous decision, extending his win streak to seven in a row. The three judges scored the bout 96-92, 97-91, and 98-90, all in favor of Golub. As a result, Golub claimed the vacant IBF-USBA Welterweight Title, improving his ranking in the IBF to #7 worldwide.

=== Golub vs Tucker ===
On 13 October 2022, Golub made his return to the boxing ring after 14 months of inactivity against Wesely Tucker. The fight was scheduled to be a 10-round Welterweight Contest, which was a Co-feature to Heather Hardy vs Calista Silgado. The fight took place at Sony Hall, New York organized by a new promotional company listed as Boxing Insider. Despite having a slow start, Golub had an impressive third and fourth round, causing Tucker's corner to stop the fight. Golub landed many tactical combinations that Tucker could not handle. As a result, Golub improved his record to 21 wins and 1 loss.

== Professional boxing record ==
22 fights	21 wins	1 loss
By knockout	16	0
By decision	5	1

No.	Result	Record	Opponent	Type	Round, time	Date	Location	Notes
22	Win	21–1	Wesley Tucker	RTD	4 (10), 3:00	Oct 13, 2022	Sony Hall, New York City, New York, U.S.	
21	Win	20–1	Eric Walker	UD	10	Aug 3, 2021	Hulu Theater, New York City, New York, U.S.	Won vacant IBF–USBA welterweight title
20	Win	19–1	Luis Eduardo Florez	TKO	6 (8), 1:58	Feb 20, 2021	Caribe Royale Orlando, Orlando, Florida, U.S.	
19	Win	18–1	Janer Gonzalez	KO	10 (10), 1:56	Nov 15, 2019	Salt Palace, Salt Lake City, Utah, U.S.	Retained WBC–USNBC welterweight title
18	Win	17–1	Joaquim Carneiro	TKO	5 (8), 1:52	Aug 1, 2019	Convention Center, Monroeville, Pennsylvania, U.S.	
17	Win	16–1	Manuel Alejandro Reyes	UD	10	Apr 10, 2019	Sony Hall, New York City, New York, U.S.	Retained WBC–USNBC welterweight title
16	Win	15–1	Lanardo Tyner	UD	10	Aug 18, 2018	Maryland Live! Casino, Hanover, Maryland, U.S.	Won WBC–USNBC welterweight title
15	Win	14–1	Fidel Monterrosa Munoz	TKO	3 (6), 2:48	Jan 20, 2018	Barclays Center, New York City, New York, U.S.	
14	Loss	13–1	Jamontay Clark	UD	8	Jun 30, 2017	Huntington Center, Toledo, Ohio, U.S.	
13	Win	13–0	James Stevenson	TKO	3 (8), 2:51	Sep 23, 2016	Buffalo Run Casino, Miami, Oklahoma, U.S.	Won vacant WBC–NABF super lightweight title
12	Win	12–0	Ernesto Ortiz	TKO	2 (6), 2:49	Jul 21, 2016	Foxwoods Resort Casino, Mashantucket, Connecticut, U.S.	
11	Win	11–0	Marlon Aguas	RTD	6 (8), 3:00	Mar 25, 2016	Buffalo Run Casino, Miami, Oklahoma, U.S.	
10	Win	10–0	Juan Rodriguez Jr	TKO	1 (8), 2:41	Jan 16, 2016	Barclays Center, New York City, New York, U.S.	
9	Win	9–0	Kendal Mena	TKO	3 (8), 1:54	Oct 7, 2015	BB King Blues Club and Grill, New York City, New York, U.S.	
8	Win	8–0	Henry Beckford	TKO	5 (6), 2:17	May 15, 2015	Connecticut Convention Center, Hartford, Connecticut, U.S.	
7	Win	7–0	Thomas Allen	TKO	2 (6), 1:15	Apr 18, 2015	Valley Forge Casino Resort, King of Prussia, Pennsylvania, U.S.	
6	Win	6–0	David Lopez	UD	6	Feb 21, 2015	Econolodge, Allentown, Pennsylvania, U.S.	
5	Win	5–0	Roshawn Abdula McCain	KO	1 (6), 2:58	Jan 29, 2015	BB King Blues Club & Grill, New York City, New York, U.S.	
4	Win	4–0	Josh Williams	KO	1 (6), 0:47	Dec 3, 2014	BB King Blues Club & Grill, New York City, New York, U.S.	
3	Win	3–0	Tyson Harrison	KO	1 (6), 2:09	Nov 13, 2014	Baltimore Arena, Baltimore, Maryland, U.S.	
2	Win	2–0	Kirk Huff	TKO	1 (6), 1:49	Oct 1, 2014	BB King Blues Club & Grill, New York City, New York, U.S.	
1	Win	1–0	Javon Wright	UD	4	Jun 27, 2014	Ameristar Casino, St Charles, Missouri, U.S.	
