= Craig Cutler =

American photographer

Craig Cutler is an American Photographer. His work has been featured in Newsweek, The New York Times Magazine, Bon Appétit, Best Life, Details, Dwell, and Men's Journal. He has photographed Advertisements for a wide range of clients, including Starbucks, Vanguard, Xbox 360, Mobil, Microsoft, and Sprint. His photos were featured in the book International Harvester, McCormick, Navistar: Milestones in the Company That Helped Build America (Graphic Arts Center Publishing, 2007).

In 2008, Cutler was selected for inclusion in the book American Photography 23, and in 2009, he won a Graphis Gold Award. Cutler's work has been exhibited at Galerie-Atelier Beeld in the Hague.

Cutler's first documentary film, "The Boxer," premiered in November of 2016 at three film festivals: DOC NYC, the Big Apple Film Festival, and New York Short Film Festival. The subject of the short is 2015 National Men's Elite Boxing champion Chordale Booker and his success in the ring following legal issues and a judge's leniency to put him on probation rather than in prison. The film was awarded the Big Apple Film Festival's Best Short Documentary.
