= Xander Zayas =

Puerto Rican professional boxer (born 2002)

Personal information
- Born: Xander Yarob Zayas Castro; September 5, 2002 (age 24) San Juan, Puerto Rico
- Height: 5 ft 10 in (178 cm)
- Weight: Light middleweight

Boxing career
- Reach: 74 in (188 cm)
- Stance: Orthodox

Boxing record
- Total fights: 24
- Wins: 23
- Win by KO: 13
- Losses: 1

Xander Yarob Zayas Castro (born September 5, 2002) is a Puerto Rican professional boxer. He was the World Boxing Association (WBA) and World Boxing Organization (WBO) light middleweight champion from January until June 2026.

== Amateur career ==
Zayas' involvement with boxing began while living in the Cantera neighborhood of San Juan, Puerto Rico in 2007, when his mother took him to a gym so he could learn to defend himself from bullies. After winning his first amateur fight at the age of six, his career took off, winning 20 consecutive bouts. Zayas dominated the youth circuit for years, gathering the Puerto Rican national title in his division on five occasions. It was after winning his third title at age ten that he decided this would be his profession. As a child, Zayas grew up admiring fellow Puerto Rican Miguel Cotto as he completed a Hall of Fame-career, with the former world champion's fights being the focus of family reunions. He also "used to watch videos of Tito Trinidad, Hector Macho Camacho, Wilfredo Benitez, all those great fighters that made Puerto Rico really proud and happy".

At the age of eleven, he moved to Sunrise, Florida along his mother, sister and stepfather. Zayas enrolled in Sweatbox Boxing & Fitness at Davie. After his first trainer died, Zayas began training under Javiel Centeno, promising he would become his first world champion and demonstrating skills beyond his age. He credits the Nuyorican trainer with "perfecting [his] style with more technical stuff. It was very composed. He sat down and worked on every punch, every combination, every footwork, the head movement. We broke everything down and put it back together like a lego". When queried about the transition, Zayas said "[as] boxing styles, it was difficult at first because the style in Puerto Rico and the style here is very different, I had to adjust to the boxing in the United States. With time I did adjust". In his words, Zayas participated in USA Boxing competitions from this point onwards due to residence. Despite this, he intended to fight in Puerto Rico as a professional as soon as he met the minimum age requirement of 18 years (he was ultimately allowed to fulfill this “dream” a year before meeting this requisite). Zayas went on to win gold medal at the 2017 and 2018 U.S. National Championships.

== Inactivity and adjustment ==
On December 17, 2018, Zayas met with advisor Peter Kahn along his immediate family, having decided to turn professional. A new age requirement of 19 prevented him from pursuing a berth in the 2020 Summer Olympics and the insecurity of boxing's inclusion in 2024 (due to long standing issues regarding the governance of AIBA, which led to a suspension by the IOC) played a role. Kahn had known of the boxer since he was thirteen, through Centeno, and had brought the topic to Bob Arum and Brad Jacobs the month before. By January, several "high-powered promoters" had made offers, but it wasn't until February that Top Rank agreed to the terms that they were requesting, having completed a market study. He became the youngest boxer to sign a contract with the promotional house in the 53 years that had passed since its foundation. Inquired about the signing, Arum first emphasized his maturity, intelligence and overall talent, but also expressed his belief that Zayas could be the "first [great] Hispanic heavyweight champion of the world" due to having open growth plates and fairly tall relatives. Despite considering him a "quality young man" and having a feeling that mirrored his assessment of Oscar De La Hoya coming out of the 1992 Summer Olympics about the possibility of becoming "a big superstar", the promoter urged caution since he was a "work in progress" and the company had never handled someone that young.

After making the decision to turn professional, he spent several months of inactivity and instead became involved in the training camps of other boxers, such as Ivan Baranchyk, Daniyar Yeluessinov, Ryan Martin, George Kambosos and Amir Imam. Meanwhile, the media used epithets that included "prodigy", "próxima gran cosa" (Spanish for "next big thing") and "niño dorado" ("golden boy") to describe Zayas and speculated he could become "The Next Great Puerto Rican Boxing Superstar." Todd duBoef, who was convinced the boxer was not too young to perform after discussing the topic with David McWater, created a merchandising strategy around this perception and modeled it after the one used for Cotto, which included him using Héctor Lavoe's Aguanile (as sung by Marc Anthony) and carrying the flag of Puerto Rico. Zayas embraced the idea, noting that he felt "ready to be that next superstar and to be someone they look up to. I want to make my people in Puerto Rico feel proud to be Puerto Rican and proud to have me as a superstar for them."

== Professional career ==
Under the Top Rank banner, Zayas made his professional debut against previously undefeated (1–0) Genesis Wynn on October 26, 2019, at the Reno-Sparks Convention Center in Reno, Nevada, winning via first round knockout (KO). He recorded two knockdowns prior to the stoppage. A month later, Zayas made his second appearance on November 30 with a repeat performance of his debut, this time against Virgel Windfield. Like his previous match, he scored two knockdowns. Zayas’ first decision win was over Corey Champion, out boxing his opponent throughout four rounds to win via unanimous decision.

On February 28, 2020, Zayas had his first fight as a professional in Puerto Rico, scoring a third-round technical knockout over Marklin Bailey. Following a lengthy hiatus caused by the COVID-19 pandemic, he returned to action by defeating Orlando Salgado in the first round on September 4, 2020. The following month, Zayas scored a first-round technical knockout over Anthony Curtiss. Zayas opened the 2021 season by earning a unanimous decision over James Martin in February, going on to score consecutive technical knockouts over DeMarcus Layton and Larry Fryers to close the first half. He concluded 2021 with six fights, outscoring José Luis Sánchez in September before scoring consecutive technical knockouts over Dan Karpency and Alessio Mastronunzio.

Zayas opened 2022, a year where his stated goal is to enter the world ranks, by going the distance to eight rounds for the first time against Quincy Lavallais. He was scheduled to fight for a regional title in the co-main event of a Top Rank card on the eve of the Puerto Rican Day Parade, but withdrew due to a viral infection. On August 13, 2022, Zayas defeated Elías Espadas by technical knockout in five rounds to win the NABO super welterweight championship.

Zayas was scheduled to face Patrick Teixeira at The Theater at Madison Square Garden in New York on June 8, 2024. Zayas won the fight by unanimous decision with the scores 100–90, 100–90, 99–91.

Zayas was scheduled to face Damian Sosa at The Theater at Madison Square Garden in New York on September 27, 2024. He won the fight by unanimous decision.

At the same venue on February 14, 2025, Zayas stopped Slawa Spomer in the ninth round.

=== WBO super welterweight champion ===
==== Zayas vs. Garcia Perez ====
Zayas faced Jorge Garcia Perez for the vacant WBO junior middleweight title in New York, on July 26, 2025. He defeated Garcia Perez by unanimous decision with all three judges scoring the bout in favor of Zayas, 116–112, 118–110, and 119–109.

=== WBO and WBA super welterweight champion ===
==== Zayas vs. Baraou ====
In his first defense of the WBO super welterweight title, Zayas faced WBA super welterweight champion Abass Baraou in a championship unification bout at José Miguel Agrelot Coliseum in San Juan, Puerto Rico on January 31, 2026. He won by split decision with two of the ringside judges both scoring the fight 116-112 in his favour while the third had it for his opponent by the same margin.

==== Zayas vs. Ennis ====
Zayas lost his unified WBA and WBO super welterweight titles to Jaron Ennis at Barclays Center in Brooklyn, NY on June 27, 2026.

== Personal life ==
Zayas lives with his mother, stepfather and sister in Plantation, Florida. He did not know any English before moving there but it took him only four months to learn, his family translating in social settings. Zayas was only a high school junior when he joined Top Rank, thus he began home schooling to graduate from Plantation High while training for his debut. His mother had set this as a requisite to sign as a professional. The prospect of continuing studies in criminal law was stated in an interview. Outside the ring, Zayas is a gaming enthusiast.

== Professional boxing record ==
24 fights	23 wins	1 loss
By knockout	13	1
By decision	10	0

No.	Result	Record	Opponent	Type	Round, time	Date	Location	Notes
24	Loss	23–1	Jaron Ennis	TKO	7 (12), 1:49	Jun 27, 2026	Barclays Center, New York City, New York, U.S.	Lost WBA and WBO light-middleweight titles
23	Win	23–0	Abass Baraou	SD	12	Jan 31, 2026	José Miguel Agrelot Coliseum, San Juan, Puerto Rico	Retained WBO light-middleweight title; Won WBA light-middleweight title
22	Win	22–0	Jorge Garcia Perez	UD	12	Jul 26, 2025	Madison Square Garden Theater, New York City, New York, U.S.	Won vacant WBO light-middleweight title
21	Win	21–0	Slawa Spomer	TKO	9 (10) 2:01	Feb 14, 2025	Madison Square Garden Theater, New York City, New York, U.S.	Retained WBO–NABO and WBC–NABF light-middleweight titles
20	Win	20–0	Damian Sosa	UD	10	Sep 28, 2024	Madison Square Garden Theater, New York City, New York, U.S.	Retained WBO–NABO and WBC–NABF light-middleweight titles
19	Win	19–0	Patrick Teixeira	UD	10	Jun 8, 2024	Madison Square Garden Theater, New York City, New York, U.S.	Retained WBO–NABO and WBC–NABF light-middleweight titles
18	Win	18–0	Jorge Fortea	KO	5 (10), 1:37	Dec 12, 2023	Charles F. Dodge City Center, Pembroke Pines, Florida, U.S.	Retained WBO–NABO and WBC–NABF light-middleweight titles
17	Win	17–0	Roberto Valenzuela Jr.	TKO	5 (10), 2:34	Sep 15, 2023	American Bank Center, Corpus Christi, Texas, U.S.	Retained WBO–NABO and WBC–NABF light-middleweight titles
16	Win	16–0	Ronald Cruz	UD	8	Jun 10, 2023	Madison Square Garden Theater, New York City, New York, U.S.	Retained WBO–NABO and WBC–NABF light-middleweight titles
15	Win	15–0	Alexis Salazar	UD	8	Dec 10, 2022	Madison Square Garden, New York City, New York, U.S.	Retained WBO–NABO light-middleweight title; Won vacant WBC–NABF light-middleweight title
14	Win	14–0	Elias Espadas	TKO	5 (8), 0:23	Aug 13, 2022	Resorts World Las Vegas, Winchester, Nevada, U.S.	Won vacant WBO–NABO light-middleweight title
13	Win	13–0	Quincy Lavallais	UD	8	Mar 19, 2022	Madison Square Garden Theater, New York City, New York, U.S.	
12	Win	12–0	Alessio Mastronunzio	TKO	1 (6), 2:52	Dec 11, 2021	Madison Square Garden, New York City, New York, U.S.	
11	Win	11–0	Dan Karpency	RTD	4 (6), 3:00	Oct 23, 2021	State Farm Arena, Atlanta, Georgia, U.S.	
10	Win	10–0	Jose Luis Sanchez	UD	6	Sep 10, 2021	Casino Del Sol, Tucson, Arizona, U.S.	
9	Win	9–0	Larry Fryers	TKO	3 (6) 0:58	Jun 12, 2021	Virgin Hotels Las Vegas, Paradise, Nevada, U.S.	
8	Win	8–0	DeMarcus Layton	TKO	1 (6) 0:56	Apr 24, 2021	Silver Spurs Arena, Kissimmee, Florida, U.S.	
7	Win	7–0	James Martin	UD	6	Feb 20, 2021	MGM Grand Conference Center, Paradise, Nevada, U.S.	
6	Win	6–0	Anthony Curtiss	TKO	1 (4), 0:55	Oct 16, 2020	Osceola Heritage Park, Kissimmee, Florida, U.S.	
5	Win	5–0	Orlando Salgado	TKO	1 (4) 2:06	Sep 4, 2020	Osceola Heritage Park, Kissimmee, Florida, U.S.	
4	Win	4–0	Marklin Bailey	TKO	3 (4), 1:14	Feb 28, 2020	Rubén Zayas Montañez Coliseum, Trujillo Alto, Puerto Rico	
3	Win	3–0	Corey Champion	UD	4	Jan 11, 2020	Hard Rock Live, Atlantic City, New Jersey, U.S.	
2	Win	2–0	Virgel Windfield	TKO	1 (4), 1:48	Nov 30, 2019	Cosmopolitan of Las Vegas, Paradise, Nevada, U.S.	
1	Win	1–0	Genesis Wynn	KO	1 (4), 1:24	Oct 26, 2019	Reno-Sparks Convention Center, Reno, Nevada, U.S.	

== See also ==
- List of male boxers
- Boxing in Puerto Rico
- List of Puerto Rican boxing world champions
- List of world light-middleweight boxing champions

Sporting positions
Regional boxing titles
Vacant Title last held by Carlos Adames	NABO light-middleweight champion August 13, 2022 – July 26, 2025; Won world title	Vacant
Vacant Title last held by Dante Jardón	NABF light-middleweight champion December 10, 2022 – July 26, 2025; Won world title	Vacant Title next held by Justin Figueroa
World boxing titles
Vacant Title last held by Sebastian Fundora	WBO light-middleweight champion July 26, 2025 – June 27, 2026	Succeeded by Jaron Ennis
Preceded by Abass Baraou	WBA light-middleweight champion January 31 – June 27, 2026	Succeeded by Jaron Ennis
