= Michael Kozlowski =

Russian-American Boxing Coach (born 1961)

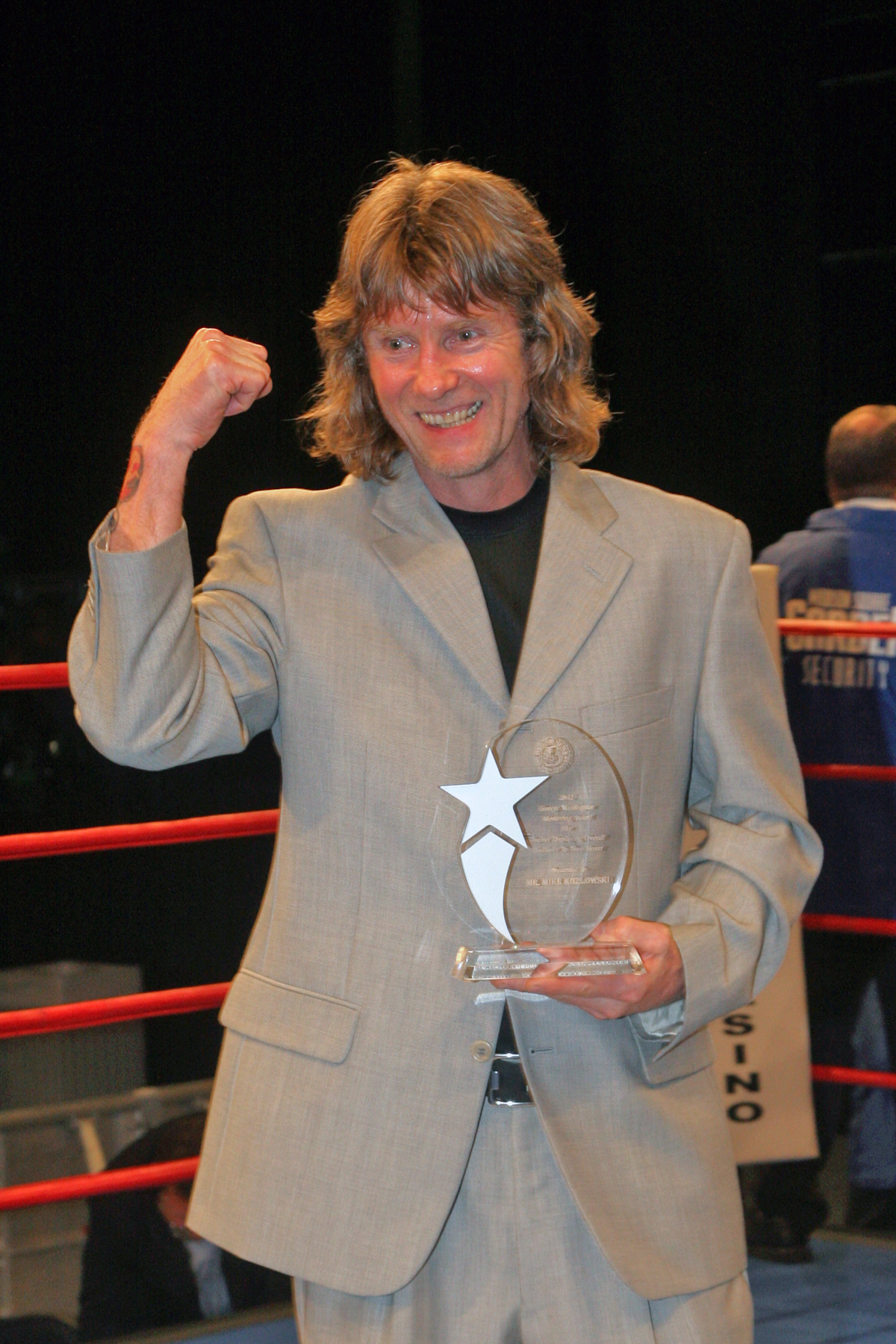
- Michael Kozlowski in 2012

Personal information
- Nickname: Coach Mike
- Nationality: Russian
- Citizenship: American, Russian
- Born: August 6, 1961 (age 65) Kazakhstan, USSR
- Education: Master’s degree in sports training and a Major in Physical Culture and Sports.
- Occupations: Boxing trainer and manager
- Children: 2
- Website: www.BoxingCoachMike.com

Sport
- Sport: Boxing
- Club: Gleason's Gym
- Now coaching: 1985 - present

Michael Kozlowski (born August 6, 1961) is a Russian-American boxing manager and trainer of Russian, Israeli, Panamanian, Chilean, and US champions, who handled the careers of Yuri Foreman (WBA World Champion), Jill Emery (IFBA World Champion), Luke Campbell (2012 Olympic Champion), Egor Plevako (European Champion), Roman Greenberg (1998 Cadet EUROPEAN silver medalist). Kozlowski was the first trainer to bring Russian-Olympic boxing style to America.

== Early life ==
Kozlowski was born in Kostanaiskaya Oblast, Kazakhstan, USSR. He and his two brothers were raised by their mother, Raisa Yakovleva, who was a teacher of Russian language and literature. At a very young age, Kozlowski became interested and involved in ice hockey. He looked up to Soviet Russian ice hockey goalkeeper Vladislav Tretiak. Kozlowski excelled academically in school, but had some behavioral issues. He was smaller than his peers and on the suggestion of a cousin, at age 15, he started to learn boxing. Under the guidance of V.E. Shairer (teacher of 2012 Olympic Bronze Medalist Ivan Dychko) and Kenes Omarov, Kozlowski wished to represent the USSR in the Olympics in Boxing.

== Career as a trainer ==
In Aktobe (then Aktubinsk), Kazakhstan, Kozlowski fought in the quarterfinals of the 1983 Kazakhstan National Championships. The fight was stopped by the referee in the 2nd round, because of a cut over Michael Kozlowski's right eye. While in the hospital, Kozlowski realized that he would never himself become a Soviet Union Champion, go to the World Championships or to the Olympic Games.

== Boxing career in Russia ==
At 23 years old Kozlowski moved to Moscow. In 1985 Michael Kozlowski's friend, the former Soviet Union boxing National Champion, Gennadiy Kurgin, helped him find a job coaching in The Olympic Boxing School of Moscow. At the same time, Michael Kozlowski began studying to get master's degree in coaching. In Russia, you cannot coach if you do not have master's degree. Long career as a coach for Michael Kozlowski began. Twenty boys ranging from 12 to 15 years old stood in front of him, all dreaming of being Olympic champions.

In 1988, 15-year-old student of boxing trainer Michael Kozlowski, Andrey Moskvichov, 106 lb (48 kg), after winning Silver medal in 1988, Russia National Junior Olympic Championships, made the Russian National Team. He was first Michael Kozlowski's student to box internationally, in Norway.

1990, (Turkey, Izmir). Michael Kozlowski left Russia as an assistant trainer with Russian team in an International tournament for the first time.

The biggest success came when in 1991 (Russia, Yoshcar-Ola), Sergey Grigoriev, 178 lbs (81 kg) became first boxing trainer Michael Kozlowski's Russian National Champion. As a result of Michael Kozlowski's coaching accomplishments, the Government presented him with a one-bedroom apartment in the Moscow region. This is the last present he received from the USSR before it collapsed in December, 1991. In this period, in order to survive in Russia, the options were limited to being a businessman, gangster, or a policeman. Many of Michael Kozlowski's students became gangsters. In 1992, one of his best prospects was killed in a gangster dispute. He was only 19 years old... In 1993, trainer Michail Kozlowski lost another great prospect, Andrey Moskvichov. He was 19 years old too... Some of his other students were imprisoned. It was no movie, it was reality. Michael Kozlowski was faced with the choice to either become a gangster or leave the country...

== Coaching career ==
=== Israel 1995–99 ===
Kozlowski to Israel on 10 May 1995 moved to Israel. Kozlowski's family were selected to be one of the families who traveled with the President of Israel, Ezer Weizman, in his plane. In the plane, the president approached Michael Kozlowski, knowing him as one of the Russian team coaches, and he asked Russian boxing trainer to make Israeli boxing like Russian boxing... President of Israel wanted to see the Israeli flag raised and hear their national anthem. It was like a sign from above when the president told to Michael Kozlowski this.

Soon after arriving in Israel, Kozlowski started training street kids in a playground of a school in Basmat Tab'un because there were no boxing gyms in Haifa. The warm climate allowed training to be conducted outdoors all-year. It took three months to find the money to buy a heavy bag. Michael Kozlowski hung this boxing bag on his balcony and students had to line up to hit the heavy bag. Yuri Foreman was first student of Israeli new boxing trainer Michael Kozlowski. In 1997, Michael Kozlowski's boxing team won the “Team Trophy” in the Israel Under-19 Nationals. Three students of Michael Kozlowski won gold medals and one student won bronze. Yuri Foreman won the gold in the 132 lbs (60 kg) weight class. Another pupil, Anton Amirov won the Israeli National Championship in the 147 lbs (67 kg) class at the 1997 championship in Tel Aviv.

The president of the Israeli Boxing Association, William Shahada, sent Michael Kozlowski to the 1997 European Championships in Birmingham as the head coach of the Israeli Under-19 National Team.

When Michael Kozlowski got back from England, Roman Greenberg, a 16 year old Israeli prospect moved into his apartment in Haifa from Tel-Aviv. Is goal was to prepare Greenberg for the Cadet Europe Championships the following year, and to bring Israel its first gold medal from a major international championship.

1998 (Latvia, Yurmala – Roman Greenberg 178 lbs (81 kg) came within a couple points of winning the gold against a Russian in the finals of the Cadet European Championships and came back to Israel with a Silver medal.

November, 1998 (Buenos-Aires, Argentina) Michael Kozlowski was the Head coach of the Israeli Boxing Team in the Youth Amateur World Championship. This was the first time boxing trainer Michael Kozlowski met the USA national team. Israeli boxing Team were staying in the same hotel. The first impression Kozlowski got was that the boxers had no discipline and were there to enjoy themselves and not win medals. The Head coach of Kazakhstan team, David Kostoev, said to Michael, that the USA Team is a "lucky draw" and they need to worry more about Cubans and Russians. This is when trainer Michael Kozlowski decided to come to America.

In this tournament, Michael Kozlowski's student Yuri Foreman beat Kazakhstan in his first bout, Denmark in the second bout, and lost a very close decision to Yugoslavia in the quarterfinals. This was the first time an Israeli boxer made it to the quarters in a World Championship. Michael Kozlowski only brought two boxers to Argentina. America (full team) only won one medal in this tournament, a bronze. Most of them lost in the first or second bout. Michael Kozlowski returned to Israel determined to move to America.

== Boxing career in America ==
Michael Kozlowski arrived in New York in January 1999. He initially wanted to train amateur boxers and then start a professional coaching career. He trained English boxer Luke Campbell and Ukrainian boxer Yegor Plevako; and his Jill Emery and Yuri Foreman who both later became professional world champions.

=== Yuri Foreman ===
Michael Kozlowski and Yuri Foreman met in Israel when Yuri was 14 years old. Trainer realized that he could make his into 2000 Olympics. Meanwhile, Yuri won Bronze medal at the Israeli Junior Olympic Championship and in 1998 men's Israeli National Championship. After the world championship in Argentina, boxing trainer Michael Kozlowski made the decision to continue his coaching career in the United States.

In the summer of 1999, Yuri Foreman came to New York City and became a member of Michael Kozlowski's family, along with trainer's 11-year-old daughter Diana and 4-year-old daughter Valerie. Kozlowski start training his student at Legendary Gleason's Gym. In 2001 Yuri won NY Golden Gloves and 2000, 2001 became Bronze medalist at the USA National Golden Gloves. After Golden Gloves trainer and boxer decided to turn Professional. In 2002 Foreman won by TKO in first round in his pro debut. In 2009 Yuri Foreman became WBA World Champion.

ACHIEVEMENTS:

1996 Bronze Medalist at the Israeli Junior Olympic Championship

1997 Under 19 Israeli National Champion

1998 Men's Israeli National Champion

2001 Daily News Golden Gloves Champion

2000, 2001 National Golden Gloves Bronze Medalist

2009 WBA World Champion

AWARDS:

2000 Mayor's Cup Amateur Boxing Tournament D.C.

=== Jill Emery ===
Before Jill Emery decided to start boxing career, she was an actress. September 1999, at Gleason's GYM, Jill came to Michael Kozlowski and asked him to teach her what Russian trainer taught Yuri Foreman. She wanted to learn Michael Kozlowski's unique style of boxing.

ACHIEVEMENTS:

2001 Emery won the first ever Female Pan American Games

2000, 2001, 2002, 2003 Jill Golden Gloves Champion in three different weight classes

2000, 2001, 2002, 2003 USA Boxing Champion

2002, 2003 Ringside Tournament Champion

2002 USA Boxing Everlast National Champion in Texas

2004 Jill Won Gold in Ahmet Comert Tournament in Istanbul (the only American to have won Gold)

In April 2004, Jill won the gold medal in the 63-kg division of the Female World Cup in Tonsberg, Norway,

2008 Professional IFBA Welterweight World Champion

AWARDS:

USA Boxing Female Athlete of the Month (several times)

2002 "Outstanding boxer" (139 Open Division) at US Police Athletic League Championship in Georgia

2004 Jill was named as USA Boxing's Female Athlete of the Year.

2004 “Outstanding Boxer of North America” award.

2015 Hall of Fame of Golden Gloves

Emery says she owes all of her success to Kozlowski, a former Israeli and Russian National team boxing coach who has taught her the same European principles that won his fighters junior Olympic and national championships in those countries.

=== Yegor Plevako ===
Yegor Plevako (Ukraine) started working with Michael Kozlowski in 2010 and Coach saw a much bigger future in his new, Ukrainian boxer Yegor Plevako, than he ever did in his former student Yuri Foreman. Plevako lived in Coach Mike's house while training.

ACHIEVEMENTS:

2011, 2012 Golden Gloves Champion

2012 European Champion

AWARDS:

2011 Sugar Ray Robinson Award for most outstanding open boxer of Daily News Golden Gloves.

2012 The Holt McCallany Championship Award.

=== Luke Campbell ===
Michael Kozlowski was working with Luke Campbell since 2008. He guided him to the European Championship where he won Gold and later he became 2012 Olympic Champion.

=== Roman Greenberg ===
Roman Greenberg, Israeli prospect, when he was 16 years old he moved into Michael Kozlowski's house in Haifa to start preparation for the Cadet European Championship. Later they came back to Israel with Silver Medal.
