= Lanardo Tyner =

American boxer

Personal information
- Nickname: Pain Server
- Nationality: American
- Born: August 2, 1975 (age 50) Detroit, Michigan
- Height: 5 ft 6 in (168 cm)
- Weight: Welterweight

Boxing career
- Reach: 70 in (178 cm)
- Stance: Southpaw

Boxing record
- Total fights: 55
- Wins: 35
- Win by KO: 22
- Losses: 16
- Draws: 2
- No contests: 2

Lanardo Tyner (born August 2, 1975) is an American professional boxer.

== Professional career ==
On December 5, 2009 Tyner lost to the Mexican Canelo Álvarez. All his losses have been quality, coming to Mike Arnaoutis, Lamont Peterson and Canelo Álvarez. Lanardo upset welterweight prospect Antwone "The Truth" Smith in the ninth by knockout.

On January 1, 2011 Tyner announced to Chicago Boxing New's Richard Spilotro that he is willing and able to jump down a weight class and fight at the Junior welterweight division. Many ring insiders believe this move will suit Tyner, mainly due to the size difference he was facing at welterweight.

On July 15, 2011, Tyner defeated the former WBA Jr welterweight champion Vivian Harris during Cynthia Tolaymat's CFC Promotions "Chicago Fight Night #2". With the win, Tyner earned the USBO welterweight title.

On August 18, 2012, Tyner defeated then-undefeated Charles Hatley in a one-round TKO, and won the vacant WBC United States (USNBC) welterweight title.

== Professional boxing record ==
31 Wins (20 knockouts, 11 decisions), 11 Losses (0 knockouts, 11 decisions), 2 Draws
Res.	Record	Opponent	Type	Rd., Time	Date	Location	Notes
Loss	35-14-2	(Ukraine) Ivan Golub	UD	10	2018-08-18	(United States) Maryland Live Casino, Hanover	
Win	35-13-2	(United States) Gundrick King	TKO	5, 1:09	2018-06-30	(United States) Laurel, Mississippi	
Win	34-13-2	(United States) Andre Byrd	UD	8	2018-04-07	(Canada) Eastern Michigan Convocation Center, Ypsilanti	
Loss	33-13-2	(Canada) Steven Butler	KO	1, 2:29	2017-12-16	Place Bell, Laval, Canada	
Loss	33-12-2	(United States) Winfred Harris Jr.	UD	8	2017-06-23	(United States) Motor City Casino, Detroit, Michigan	
Win	33-11-2	(Colombia) Luis Eduardo Florez	UD	8	2017-03-26	(United States) Ford Community Center, Dearborn, Michigan	
Win	32-11-2	(Hungary) Istvan Dernanecz	TKO	1 ,2:59	2017-01-22	(United States) Masonic Temple, Detroit, Michigan	
Loss	31-11-2	(Mexico) Antonio DeMarco	UD	10	2014-08-23	Campos Deportivos de la Casa Social Cerveceria Tecate, Tecate, Mexico	
Loss	31-10-2	(Poland) Lukasz Maciec	MD	10	2014-05-31	Hala Globus, ul. Kazimierza Wielkiego 8, Lublin, Poland	
Loss	31-9-2	(United States) Chris Pearson	SD	8	2014-02-28	(United States) Turning Stone Resort & Casino, Verona, New York	
Win	31-8-2	(United States) Angel Hernandez	TKO	10,2:59	2014-01-10	(United States) Masonic Temple, Detroit, Michigan	
Win	30-8-2	(United States) Tyrese Hendrix	TKO	12,2:30	2013-05-09	(United States) Hilton Anatole Hotel, Dallas, Texas	
Win	29-8-2	(United States) Gabriel Morris	TKO	1,2:58	2013-03-07	(United States) Motor City Casino, Detroit, Michigan	
Win	28-8-2	(United States) Marteze Logan	TKO	1,2:37	2012-11-01	(United States) Chase Towers, Dallas, Texas	
Win	27-8-2	(Puerto Rico) Angel Rios	UD	6	2012-10-12	(United States) Sportplex, Taylor, Michigan	
Win	26-8-2	(United States) Charles Hatley	TKO	1,1:44	2012-10-12	(United States) Fairmont Hotel, Dallas, Texas	Won vacant WBC United States (USNBC) welterweight title
Loss	25-8-2	(Canada) Dierry Jean	UD	12	2012-05-19	Holiday Inn, Pointe-Claire, Quebec, Canada	For vacant NABF light welterweight title
Loss	25-7-2	(United States) Jessie Vargas	UD	10	2012-02-24	(United States) Hard Rock Hotel and Casino, Paradise, Nevada	
Loss	25-6-2	(Canada) Kevin Bizier	UD	12	2011-12-17	Pepsi Coliseum, Quebec City, Canada	For vacant NABA welterweight title
Loss	25-5-2	(Nigeria) Wale Omotoso	UD	8	2011-11-19	(United States) Reliant Arena, Houston, Texas	
Win	25-4-2	(Guyana) Vivian Harris	UD	10	2011-07-15	(United States) The Club Chicago, Burbank, Illinois	Won vacant USBO welterweight title
Draw	24-4-2	(Mexico) Adrian Granados	SD	8	2011-03-25	(United States) Hanging Gardens, River Grove, Illinois	
Loss	24-4-1	(Canada) Andre Gorges	SD	8	2010-10-30	(United States) The Palace, Auburn Hills, Michigan	
Draw	24-3-1	(Mexico) Cristian Favela	MD	8	2010-09-17	(United States) Parking Lot 7 at LA Live, Los Angeles, California	
Win	24-3-0	(United States) Antwone Smith	TKO	9,1:15	2010-09-17	(United States) Boardwalk Hall, Atlantic City, New Jersey	
Win	23-3-0	(United States) Anthony Middlebrooks	KO	4,0:40	2010-05-22	(United States) House of Blues, Houston, Texas	For vacant USA Texas State welterweight title
Win	22-3-0	(United States) Taronze Washington	UD	8	2010-02-19	(United States) Stafford Center, Stafford, Texas	
Loss	21-3-0	(Mexico) Canelo Álvarez	UD	12	2009-12-05	Tepic, Mexico	For
Win	21-2-0	(United States Virgin Islands) Rohan Nanton	TKO	2,2:55	2009-08-06	(United States) Hilton Americas Hotel, Houston, Texas	
Win	20-2-0	(Cuba) Ivan Ledon	KO	2,0:34	2009-05-01	(United States) DeCarlo's Convention Center, Warren, Michigan	
Loss	19-2-0	(United States) Lamont Peterson	UD	10	2008-11-01	(United States) Mandalay Bay Resort & Casino, Paradise, Nevada	For interim NABF light welterweight title
Loss	19-1-0	(Greece) Mike Arnaoutis	UD	12	2008-05-09	(United States) Ballys Park Place Hotel Casino, Atlantic City, New Jersey	For USBA light welterweight title
Win	19-0-0	(Panama) Victorio Abadia	KO	1	2008-02-01	(United States) The Palace, Auburn Hills, Michigan	
Win	18-0-0	(United States) Wayne Fletcher	UD	4	2007-11-29	(United States) Grand Plaza Hotel, Houston, Texas	
Win	17-0-0	(United States) Marteze Logan	RTD	8	2007-09-21	(United States) Meadow Brook Music Festival, Rochester Hills, Michigan	
Win	16-0-0	(Panama) Armando Córdoba	UD	8	2007-04-18	(United States) Sears Centre, Hoffman Estates, Illinois	
Win	15-0-0	(United States) Kelly Wright	UD	8	2006-12-16	(United States) Bert's Warehouse Theatre, Detroit, Michigan	
Win	14-0-0	(United States) Martinus Clay	MD	8	2006-10-20	(United States) The Palace, Auburn Hills, Michigan	
Win	13-0-0	(United States) Gilbert Venegas	MD	10	2006-07-15	(United States) Fifth Third Ballpark, Comstock Park, Michigan	
Win	12-0-0	(United States) Randy Dodds	TKO	2,2:24	2006-06-03	(United States) The Palace, Auburn Hills, Michigan	
Win	11-0-0	(United States) James Merriweather	KO	1,2:55	2006-04-08	(United States) Lansing Center, Lansing, Michigan	
Win	10-0-0	(United States) Leo Martinez	KO	1,2:42	2006-02-04	(United States) The Palace, Auburn Hills, Michigan	Won vacant USA Mid American light welterweight title
Win	9-0-0	(Dominican Republic) Ramon Guevara	KO	1,1:26	2005-07-30	(United States) Cobo Arena, Detroit, Michigan	
Win	8-0-0	(Puerto Rico) Jose Angel Roman	UD	6	2005-06-10	(United States) State Fair Grounds, Detroit, Michigan	
Win	7-0-0	(United States) Kenny Abril	UD	6	2005-04-29	(United States) The Palace, Auburn Hills, Michigan	
Win	6-0-0	(United States) Rodney Robinson	TKO	1,2:12	2005-04-20	(United States) Andiamo's, Warren, Michigan	
Win	5-0-0	(United States) Alexis Rubin	TKO	1,0:54	2005-02-18	(United States) State Fair Grounds, Detroit, Michigan	
Win	4-0-0	(United States) Anthony Johnson	TKO	1,1:37	2005-01-28	(United States) DeCarlo's Convention Center, Warren, Michigan	
Win	3-0-0	(United States) Joe Howard	TKO	1	2004-11-19	(United States) Michigan State Fairgrounds, Detroit, Michigan	
Win	2-0-0	(Mexico) Carlos Barreras	UD	4	2004-10-08	(United States) DeCarlo's Banquet Center, Warren, Michigan	
Win	1-0-0	(United States) Danny Lopez	TKO	3	2004-08-28	(United States) Cobo Hall, Detroit, Michigan	
