= Andre Gorges =

Iraqi-Canadian boxer (born 1985)

Personal information
- Nickname: Gorgeous
- Born: Andre Gorges; 30 April 1985 (age 41) Baghdad, Iraq
- Weight: Light welterweight Welterweight

Boxing career
- Stance: Southpaw

Boxing record
- Total fights: 15
- Wins: 12
- Win by KO: 7
- Losses: 3

Andre Gorges (born 30 April 1985) is an Iraqi-Canadian former professional boxer who competed from 2008 to 2014. He is a former North American Boxing Association (NABA) USA welterweight champion.

== Boxing career ==
=== Amateur career ===
Gorges had a successful amateur career, winning several tournaments and titles, including three Ringside World Championships and the 2002 Brampton Cup. He also received the Bill White Best Boxer Award five times.

=== Professional career ===
Gorges opened his professional career with a 9–1 record before facing rising welterweight contender Lanardo Tyner in an eight-round bout for the vacant NABA USA welterweight title at The Palace of Auburn Hills on 30 October 2010. Gorges earned a split-decision victory, with judges scoring the fight 78–74 and 77–75 in his favor, while one judge awarded it to Tyner, 77–74.

==== Gorges vs. Corley ====
Gorges next faced former WBO light welterweight champion DeMarcus Corley in an eight-round non-title bout at the Fairmont Royal York in Toronto on 29 March 2011, winning by split decision.

==== Gorges vs. Mensah ====
Gorges faced Albert Mensah for the vacant IBF International light welterweight title on 15 July 2011. He lost the bout by majority decision.

==== Gorges vs. Crawford ====
Gorges faced future five-division world champion and three-division undisputed champion Terence Crawford on 14 April 2012. He was knocked out in the fifth round.

==== Gorges vs. Avdiev ====
In what would be the final bout of his career, Gorges faced Tamaz Avdiev on 3 May 2014, winning by fifth-round knockout.

Gorges retired with a professional record of 12–3.

== Personal life ==
Following his professional career, Gorges transitioned into coaching, working with young athletes at Border City Boxing Club in Windsor, Ontario.

== Professional boxing record ==
15 fights	12 wins	3 losses
By knockout	7	1
By decision	5	2

No.	Result	Record	Opponent	Type	Round, time	Date	Location	Notes
15	Win	12–3	Tamaz Avdiev	KO	5 (6), 3:00	3 May 2014	Hershey Centre, Mississauga, Ontario, Canada	
14	Loss	11–3	Terence Crawford	KO	5 (6), 0:44	14 Apr 2012	Mandalay Bay Events Center, Las Vegas, Nevada, U.S.	
13	Loss	11–2	Albert Mensah	MD	12 (12)	15 Jul 2011	The Club Chicago, Burbank, Illinois, U.S.	For vacant IBF International light welterweight title
12	Win	11–1	DeMarcus Corley	SD	8 (8)	29 Mar 2011	Fairmont Royal York, Toronto, Ontario, Canada	
11	Win	10–1	Lanardo Tyner	SD	8 (8)	30 Oct 2010	The Palace of Auburn Hills, Auburn Hills, Michigan, U.S.	Won vacant NABA USA welterweight title
10	Win	9–1	Dean Peters Jr.	UD	5 (5)	4 Dec 2009	Royal Oak Music Theatre, Royal Oak, Michigan, U.S.	
9	Loss	8–1	Abdon Lozano	UD	6 (6)	3 Jul 2009	Plaza Hotel & Casino, Las Vegas, Nevada, U.S.	
8	Win	8–0	Gabriel Del Real	UD	4 (4)	8 May 2009	Plaza Hotel & Casino, Las Vegas, Nevada, U.S.	
7	Win	7–0	Matt Ellis	TKO	3 (4), 2:20	1 May 2009	Majestic Theatre, Detroit, Michigan, U.S.	
6	Win	6–0	Guy Packer	UD	4 (4)	28 Mar 2009	Royal Oak Music Theatre, Royal Oak, Michigan, U.S.	
5	Win	5–0	Mike Fitzgerald	TKO	2 (4), 2:36	31 Jan 2009	Royal Oak Music Theatre, Royal Oak, Michigan, U.S.	
4	Win	4–0	Joshua Rodriguez	TKO	1 (4), 2:10	14 Nov 2008	Royal Oak Music Theatre, Royal Oak, Michigan, U.S.	
3	Win	3–0	Jamal Kahn	KO	1 (4), 2:09	19 Sep 2008	Royal Oak Music Theatre, Royal Oak, Michigan, U.S.	
2	Win	2–0	Eric Rue	TKO	2 (4), 1:04	7 Aug 2008	Royal Oak Music Theatre, Royal Oak, Michigan, U.S.	
1	Win	1–0	Dustin Cooley	TKO	1 (4), 0:50	20 Jun 2008	Detroit, Michigan, U.S.	
