= Sebastian Fundora =

American boxer (born 1997)

Personal information
- Nickname: The Towering Inferno
- Born: Sebastian Alexander Fundora; December 28, 1997 (age 28) West Palm Beach, Florida, U.S.
- Height: 6 ft 6 in (198 cm)
- Weight: Light middleweight

Boxing career
- Reach: 80 in (203 cm)
- Stance: Southpaw

Boxing record
- Total fights: 27
- Wins: 25
- Win by KO: 17
- Losses: 1
- Draws: 1
Medal record
Men's amateur boxing
National PAL Championships
Silver medal – second place	2013 Oxnard	Lightweight

Sebastian Alexander Fundora (born 28 December 1997) is an American professional boxer who has held the World Boxing Council (WBC) light middleweight title since March 2024, and previously held the World Boxing Organization (WBO) light middleweight title from 2024 to 2025. As of April 2025, he is ranked as the fifth-best active light middleweight by The Ring magazine.

He and his sister Gabriela are the first brother-sister duo to become world champions in boxing history.

== Professional career ==
Fundora made his professional debut against Jose Cardenas on 24 September 2016. He won the fight by a first-round knockout. Fundora amassed a 12–0 record during the next three years.

Fundora was booked to face the undefeated Donnie Marshall on 16 February 2019. He won the fight by a third-round knockout. Fundora faced another undefeated opponent, Hector Manuel Zepeda, on 21 June 2019 in the main event of Showtime's "ShoBox: The New Generation" card. Zepeda retired from the bout at the end of the fourth round. Fundora next faced Jamontay Clark for the vacant WBC Youth super welterweight title on 31 August 2019, on the undercard of the Erislandy Lara and Ramon Alvarez WBA super welterweight title bout. The fight was ruled a draw by split decision.

Fundora faced the unbeaten Daniel Lewis on 22 February 2020, on the Deontay Wilder vs. Tyson Fury II undercard. He won the fight by unanimous decision, with scores of 98–92, 99–91, and 97–93. Fundora was next booked to face Nathaniel Gallimore on 22 August 2020. He won the fight by a sixth-round knockout. Fundora faced Habib Ahmed on 5 December 2020, in his final fight of the year. He made quick work of Ahmed, winning the fight by a second-round knockout.

Fundora was booked to face Jorge Cota on 1 May 2021. He won the fight by a fourth-round technical knockout. Fundora was leading 30–27 on three of the judges' scorecards at the time of the stoppage. Fundora faced Sergio Garcia in a WBC super welterweight title eliminator on 5 December 2021, on the undercard of the Gervonta Davis and Isaac Cruz lightweight bout. Fundora won the fight by unanimous decision, with scores of 115–113, 118–110 and 117–111.

Fundora was booked to face Erickson Lubin for the WBC interim super welterweight title on 9 April 2022. The bout served as a WBC title eliminator as well, with the winner expected to face the victor of the title unification rematch between Jermell Charlo and Brian Castaño. He won the fight by a ninth-round stoppage, as Lubin was retired by his corner at the end of the round. Lubin (24–2, 17 KOs) rallied to score a knockdown of Fundora with a flurry of punches in the waning moments of Round 7 and was ahead on two scorecards 85-84 when the fight was stopped (the other score was 85-85).

Fundora made his first WBC interim super welterweight title against Carlos Ocampo on 8 October 2022. He retained the title by unanimous decision, with scores of 117–111, 118–110, and 119–109.

Fundora was booked to make his second WBC interim title defense against Brian Mendoza on 8 April 2023. He lost the fight by a seventh-round knockout. Fundora was knocked down with a flurry of punches near the beginning of the round and failed to rise from the canvas before the ten count ended. He was up on the scorecards at the time of the stoppage, with two judges having awarded him every single round of the contest up to that point, while the third ringside official had him up 59–55.

=== Unified WBO and WBC super welterweight champion ===
==== Fundora vs. Tszyu ====
Fundora was scheduled to face Serhii Bohachuk for the vacant WBC super welterweight title on March 30, 2024, at T-Mobile Arena in Las Vegas. However, he faced Tim Tszyu in the main event of that evening for both the vacant WBC title, as well as Tim's WBO super welterweight title, due to Keith Thurman pulling out of the bout with Tszyu following an injury during a training session. Fundora defeated Tszyu by split decision.

==== Fundora vs. Booker ====
On August 28, 2024, it was reported that the WBO had ordered Terence Crawford, who held the WBA and interim WBO titles, to face Fundora. The Crawford fight fell through, so Fundora was then expected to face Errol Spence Jr., which also fell through.

In January 2025, it was reported that Fundora was "considered" to face Charles Conwell. Later the same month, it was reported that Fundora and Chordale Booker were close to make a deal for a fight on March 22, 2025, in Las Vegas. The Fundora vs Booker bout was officially announced on February 11, 2025, to take place at Michelob Ultra Arena in Las Vegas on March 22, 2025. Fundora won the fight by TKO in the fourth round.

=== WBC super welterweight championship reign ===
==== Fundora vs. Tszyu 2 ====
On May 2, 2025, Fundora was stripped of his WBO title for refusing to face mandatory challenger Xander Zayas, instead opting to honor his rematch clause with Tim Tszyu.

The rematch occurred on July 19, 2025, at the MGM Grand Garden Arena. Fundora defeated Tszyu by seventh round corner stoppage.

==== Thurman Fight: Injury Postponement and Rescheduling ====
In October 2025, Fundora suffered a hand injury during training camp that forced the postponement of his scheduled October 25 title defense against Thurman. The injury occurred when Fundora landed a punch that connected with his sparring partner's elbow during a training session on October 9. Although the hand was not fractured, Fundora was unable to spar for three weeks due to a contusion that caused inflammation and swelling. Following the postponement, it was reported that the Fundora–Thurman fight was expected to be rescheduled for late January 2026, potentially landing on the undercard of Manny Pacquiao's comeback fight against Rolly Romero in Las Vegas. The Pacquiao card was initially set for January 24, though sources indicated it could shift to January 31.

Fundora's bout against Thurman was rescheduled for March 28, 2026, at the MGM Grand Garden Arena in Las Vegas. Fundora beat Thurman by TKO in the 6th round.

== Professional boxing record ==
27 fights	25 wins	1 loss
By knockout	17	1
By decision	8	0
Draws	1	

No.	Result	Record	Opponent	Type	Round, time	Date	Location	Notes
27	Win	25–1–1	Ermal Hadribeaj	KO	12 (12), 2:59	17 Oct 2026	The Cosmopolitan, Paradise, Nevada, U.S.	Retained WBC light middleweight title
26	Win	24–1–1	Keith Thurman	TKO	6 (12), 1:17	28 Mar 2026	MGM Grand Garden Arena, Paradise, Nevada, U.S.	Retained WBC light middleweight title
25	Win	23–1–1	Tim Tszyu	RTD	7 (12), 3:00	19 Jul 2025	MGM Grand Garden Arena, Paradise, Nevada, U.S.	Retained WBC light middleweight title
24	Win	22–1–1	Chordale Booker	TKO	4 (12), 2:51	22 Mar 2025	Michelob Ultra Arena, Paradise, Nevada, U.S.	Retained WBC and WBO light middleweight titles
23	Win	21–1–1	Tim Tszyu	SD	12	30 Mar 2024	T-Mobile Arena, Paradise, Nevada, U.S.	Won WBO and vacant WBC light middleweight titles
22	Loss	20–1–1	Brian Mendoza	KO	7 (12), 0:39	8 Apr 2023	Dignity Health Sports Park, Carson, California, U.S.	Lost WBC interim light middleweight title
21	Win	20–0–1	Carlos Ocampo	UD	12	8 Oct 2022	Dignity Health Sports Park, Carson, California, U.S.	Retained WBC interim light middleweight title
20	Win	19–0–1	Erickson Lubin	RTD	9 (12), 3:00	9 Apr 2022	Virgin Hotels Las Vegas, Paradise, Nevada, U.S.	Won vacant WBC interim light middleweight title
19	Win	18–0–1	Sergio Garcia	UD	12	5 Dec 2021	Staples Center, Los Angeles, California, U.S.	
18	Win	17–0–1	Jorge Cota	TKO	4 (12), 2:35	1 May 2021	Dignity Health Sports Park, Carson, California, U.S.	
17	Win	16–0–1	Habib Ahmed	TKO	2 (12), 1:30	5 Dec 2020	AT&T Stadium, Arlington, Texas, U.S.	
16	Win	15–0–1	Nathaniel Gallimore	KO	6 (10), 1:28	22 Aug 2020	Microsoft Theater, Los Angeles, California, U.S.	
15	Win	14–0–1	Daniel Lewis	UD	10	22 Feb 2020	MGM Grand Garden Arena, Paradise, Nevada, U.S.	
14	Draw	13–0–1	Jamontay Clark	SD	10	31 Aug 2019	Minneapolis Armory, Minneapolis, Minnesota, U.S.	For vacant WBC Youth light middleweight title
13	Win	13–0	Hector Manuel Zepeda	RTD	4 (10), 3:00	21 Jun 2019	WinnaVegas Casino & Resort, Sloan, Iowa, U.S.	
12	Win	12–0	Donnie Marshall	KO	3 (10), 1:08	16 Feb 2019	Microsoft Theater, Los Angeles, California, U.S.	
11	Win	11–0	Jeremiah Wiggins	KO	1 (6), 0:31	17 Nov 2018	Casino Del Sol, Tucson, Arizona, U.S.	
10	Win	10–0	Antonio Urista	TKO	4 (8), 2:32	24 Aug 2018	Minneapolis Armory, Minneapolis, Minnesota, U.S.	
9	Win	9–0	Ve Shawn Owens	TKO	5 (8), 2:37	13 Apr 2018	Minneapolis Armory, Minneapolis, Minnesota, U.S.	
8	Win	8–0	David Ezequiel Romero	UD	6	16 Dec 2017	Estadio F.A.B., Buenos Aires, Argentina	
7	Win	7–0	Emiliano David Silguero	UD	6	24 Nov 2017	Centro de Convenciones, Punta del Este, Uruguay	
6	Win	6–0	Ricardo Arce Sarmiento	KO	1 (4), 0:35	28 Oct 2017	Gimnasio de Mexicali, Mexicali, Mexico	
5	Win	5–0	Victor Toney	UD	6	26 Sep 2017	Cannery Casino & Hotel, Las Vegas, Nevada, U.S.	
4	Win	4–0	Luis Misael Juarez	TKO	1 (6), 2:45	28 Jul 2017	Plaza Tinaco, Empalme, Mexico	
3	Win	3–0	Obed Soto	TKO	2 (6), 1:23	19 May 2017	Gimnasio Solidaridad, Hermosillo, Mexico	
2	Win	2–0	Martin Rosas	UD	4	28 Apr 2017	Arena ITSON, Ciudad Obregon, Mexico	
1	Win	1–0	Jose Cardenas	KO	1 (4), 1:12	24 Sep 2016	Los Angeles Badminton Club, El Monte, California, U.S.	

== Personal life ==
Sebastian Fundora's younger sister Gabriela Fundora is also a professional boxer. They are both trained by their father, Freddy.

In 2025, Fundora announced he is set to begin a six-year engineering program at Harvard University.

== See also ==
- Notable boxing families
- List of southpaw stance boxers
- List of Mexican boxing world champions
- List of world light-middleweight boxing champions

Sporting positions
World boxing titles
Vacant Title last held by Sergio Martínez	WBC light middleweight champion Interim title April 9, 2022 – April 8, 2023	Succeeded by Brian Mendoza
Vacant Title last held by Jermell Charlo	WBC light middleweight champion March 30, 2024 – present	Incumbent
Preceded by Tim Tszyu	WBO light middleweight champion March 30, 2024 – May 2, 2025; Vacated	Vacant Title next held by Xander Zayas
Awards
Previous: Tyson Fury vs. Deontay Wilder III; Round 4	The Ring Round of the Year vs. Erickson Lubin; Round 7; 2022	Next: O'Shaquie Foster vs. Eduardo Hernández; Round 11
