= Etinosa Oliha =

Italian boxer (born 1998)

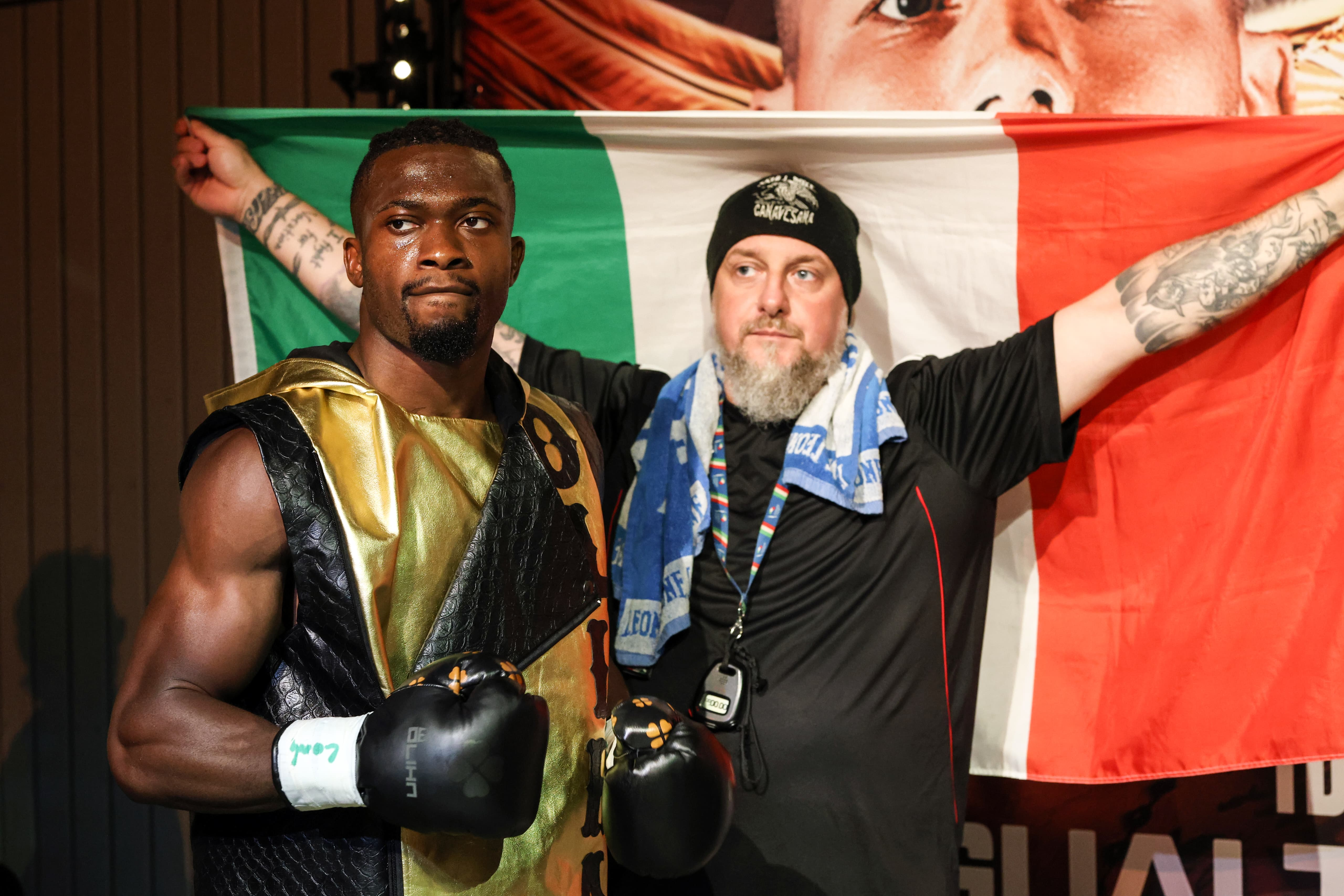

Personal information
- Nickname: El Chapo
- Nationality: Italian
- Born: Etinosa Godwin Oliha; 13 June 1998 (age 28) Turin, Italy
- Weight: Middleweight

Boxing career
- Stance: Orthodox

Boxing record
- Total fights: 23
- Wins: 22
- Win by KO: 10
- Losses: 1

Etinosa Godwin Oliha (born 13 June 1998) is an Italian professional boxer who competes in the middleweight division. He held the International Boxing Organisation (IBO) middleweight title from 2023 to 2024.

== Early and personal life ==
Etinosa Oliha was born on 13 June 1998 in Turin to Patricia and Murphy Oliha, both of whom immigrated from Nigeria. When he was five years old, the family moved to Asti. Oliha has an older brother and two older sisters.

After his school education, Oliha completed an apprenticeship as an electrician. He lives in Asti.

== Amateur career ==
At the age of 14, Oliha took part in an event organized by the city where the sports clubs from Asti presented themselves together. Here he came into contact with Skull Boxe Canavesana and Davide Greguoldo. Oliha was thrilled and joined the club, while Greguoldo took over his training. To this day he is a member of the club and Gregualdo is his coach.

In his amateur career, Oliha amassed 59 fights, including 45 wins, 12 losses and two draws. 2016 Italian youth champion. His personal highlight was the gold medal at the Italian championship.

== Professional career ==
Oliha began his professional career at the age of 19. He continues to be coached by his amateur trainer Davide Greguoldo.

On 10 February 2020, he defeated his compatriot Carlo de Novellis and became Italian middleweight champion. He successfully defended the championship twice before relinquishing it to fight Sofiane Khati for the vacant International Boxing Organization (IBO) Mediterranean middleweight title. He defeated the Frenchman by retirement in the fifth round.

Agon Sports & Events invited Oliha as a sparring opponent for its middleweight and super middleweight boxers. Oliha convinced the AGON management with his performance and signed a contract with the Berlin boxing promotion in November 2022. In his stable debut on 24 February 2023, he defeated Rafael Amarillas Ortiz and became Intercontinental Middleweight Champion of the WBO.

=== IBO middleweight champion ===
Five months later, on 1 July 2023, the IBO's Intercontinental Championship against the Chilean Julio Álamos, originally planned by AGON, was declared a world title fight by the IBO, because the reigning champion Gennady Golovkin had relinquished his world title. Oliha defeated Alamos on points and was thus the Berlin boxing stable's first world title holder. With his victory he also closed the gap between Italian world champions in the upper weight classes. Prior to this, Giovanni De Carolis had been most recently the world title holder of the GBU and WBA, who handed over both titles to Tyron Zeuge in November 2016.

In his first title defense, Oliha faced Faton Vukshinaj on 25 November 2023. He won the bout by unanimous decision.

On 14 September 2024, Oliha faced German Alexander Pavlov in a bid of an IBF middleweight eliminator in AGON Sport Park in Berlin, Germany. He won via third round technical knockout.

Oliha fought undefeated Aaron McKenna for the vacant IBF middleweight title at 3Arena in Dublin, Ireland, on 8 August 2026, losing by unanimous decision.

== Professional boxing record ==
23 fights	22 wins	1 loss
By knockout	10	0
By decision	12	1

No.	Result	Record	Opponent	Type	Round, time	Date	Location	Notes
23	Loss	22–1	Aaron McKenna	UD	12	8 Aug 2026	3Arena, Dublin, Ireland	For vacant IBF middleweight title
22	Win	22–0	Ivan Njegac	TKO	3 (6)	12 Sep 2025	Uber Eats Music Hall, Berlin, Germany	
21	Win	21–0	Alexander Pavlov	TKO	3 (12), 2:30	14 Sep 2024	AGON Sportpark, Berlin, Germany	
20	Win	20–0	Ismaël Seck	UD	10	6 Apr 2024	Stadthalle, Falkensee, Germany	Won vacant IBF International middleweight title
19	Win	19–0	Faton Vukshinaj	UD	12	25 Nov 2023	Cultura, Rietberg, Germany	Retained IBO middleweight title
18	Win	18–0	Julio Álamos	UD	12	1 Jul 2023	Unihalle, Wuppertal, Germany	Won vacant IBO middleweight title
17	Win	17–0	Rafael Amarillas Ortiz	TKO	6 (12), 1:22	24 Feb 2023	AGON Sportpark, Berlin, Germany	Won vacant WBO Inter-Continental middleweight title
16	Win	16–0	Sofiane Khati	RTD	5 (10), 3:00	10 Jul 2022	Sequals, Friuli-Venezia Giulia, Italy	Won vacant IBO Mediterranean middleweight title
15	Win	15–0	Francesco Lezzi	UD	10	2 Jul 2021	Stadio Comunale, Asti, Italy	Retained Italian middleweight title
14	Win	14–0	Bogdan Malinović	TKO	2 (6)	19 Mar 2021	PalaErrebi San Quirico, Asti, Italy	
13	Win	13–0	Francesco Lezzi	PTS	6	5 Dec 2020	Palasport, Maclodio, Italy	
12	Win	12–0	Andrea Roncon	UD	10	21 Aug 2020	PalaDelta, Porto Viro, Italy	Retained Italian middleweight title
11	Win	11–0	Carlo De Novellis	UD	10	21 Feb 2020	PalaErrebi San Quirico, Asti, Italy	Won vacant Italian middleweight title
10	Win	10–0	Santos Medrano	KO	3 (6)	20 Sep 2019	Palasport, Schio, Italy	
9	Win	9–0	Ricardo Pompeo Mellone	PTS	6	5 Jul 2019	Grugliasco, Piedmont, Italy	
8	Win	8–0	Jorge Ortiz	TKO	3 (6)	14 Jun 2019	Palasport, Grumello del Monte, Italy	
7	Win	7–0	Petru Chiochiu	PTS	6	25 Apr 2019	Palasport San Filippo, Brescia, Italy	
6	Win	6–0	Fabio Mastromarino	UD	8	8 Dec 2018	PalaGeorge, Montichiari, Italy	
5	Win	5–0	Srečko Janjić	TKO	2 (6)	27 Oct 2018	Asti, Piedmont, Italy	
4	Win	4–0	Giuseppe Rauseo	PTS	6	14 Sep 2018	PalaSport, Cusano Mutri, Italy	
3	Win	3–0	Mladen Jovanović	KO	3 (6)	15 Jul 2018	Centro Sportivo, Sequals, Italy	
2	Win	2–0	Vadim Gurau	TKO	4 (6), 2:09	22 Jun 2018	Palasport, Corneliano d'Alba, Italy	
1	Win	1–0	Jean Marc Yao Assouman	PTS	6	19 May 2018	Palasport San Filippo, Brescia, Italy	
