= Roman Greenberg =

Israeli boxer (born 1982)

Roman Greenberg רומן גרינברג
Personal information
- Nickname: "Lion from Zion"
- Nationality: Israeli
- Born: May 18, 1982 (age 44) Balti, Moldavian SSR, Soviet Union
- Height: 189 cm (74 in)
- Weight: Heavyweight

Boxing career
- Stance: Orthodox

Boxing record
- Total fights: 28
- Wins: 27
- Win by KO: 18
- Losses: 1

Roman Greenberg (Hebrew: רומן גרינברג; born May 18, 1982) is an Israeli former heavyweight boxer based in the United Kingdom, with Moldovan origins (his parents emigrated from Soviet Union when he was 6 years old), former International Boxing Organization's (IBO's) Intercontinental heavyweight champion, with a 27–1 record. Greenberg has been nicknamed the "Lion from Zion."

== Biography ==
Greenberg was born on May 18, 1982, in Bălţi, Moldova. His family immigrated to Tel Aviv, Israel, soon after his birth. He began boxing at age 11 after a friend took him to a boxing club in Kiryat Bialik. He won a silver medal at the 2000 Junior World Championships in Budapest. Greenberg speaks four languages – Hebrew, Russian, German, and English. Greenberg's brother was the Junior Chess Champion of Israel in 2004. He is well known for his vocal support of the State of Israel. Greenberg wears a Star of David on his trunks. He trains in Maidenhead, Berkshire, and has a home near Haifa. His manager and trainer is Jim Evans.

== Boxing career ==
In 1999, Greenberg became the youngest person to win the Israeli national heavyweight title. Greenberg won a silver medal at the Junior World Championships in 2000 in Budapest where he beat Viktar Zuyev 14:8 but lost to Dzhamal Medzhydov (Ukr). He posted a 47–5 amateur record.

"Greenberg has the fastest hands for a heavyweight since Muhammad Ali."

— Angelo Dundee

Greenberg made his pro debut in November 2001, after serving seven months in the Israeli Army. In 2003, he knocked out Lithuanian Mindaugas Kulikauskas in the 5th round. He won his first 27 professional bouts – 18 by K.O. – before he was beaten in 2008.

He won the IBO Intercontinental Championship by 6th-round TKO against Alex Vassilev in March 2006. His 25th victory was a unanimous decision over Michael Simms (formerly 19–6–1; 13 KOs) at Madison Square Garden in March 2007. He won nine out of 10 rounds.

Greenberg next defeated American veteran Damon "Dangerous" Reed at the South Town Exhibition Center in Salt Lake City, Utah, on August 18, 2007. Reed, 43–11–(5), a former WBO title challenger, had won his last three fights and fought some of the leading heavyweight and cruiserweight contenders in the world since turning professional in April 1995.

Greenberg defeated Colin Kenna on points over eight rounds in London in October 2007. The only time Greenberg "was in any trouble was when his stool collapsed under his sixteen and a half stone frame at the end of fifth round."

In December 2007 Greenberg underwent a hand operation to repair an injury to the second and third metacarpals of his right hand.

Greenberg lost his first bout against heavyweight contender Cedric Boswell (28–1; 22 KOs) in August 2008. He lost via TKO in the second round, after taking numerous punches from Boswell, who won for the 28th time in 29 fights, and is looking for a title bout opportunity. In June 2009, he was ranked 53rd in the International Boxing Organization's heavyweight computerized rankings. Of those ahead of him, only two were younger than he is. Greenberg has not fought in the ring after his loss to Boswell.

"Through the Star of David, I represent Israel and myself. All through history, the Jews have always had to fight for their freedom and for their lives. When I come out wearing the Star of David, it shows the whole world that the Jews are still here and that they are successful."

— Greenberg

== Jewish heritage ==
Greenberg was one of three top Jewish boxers in January 2009, the others being Dmitry Salita junior welterweight (29–0–1) and Yuri Foreman, the middleweight (30–1–2).

== See also ==
- Sport in Israel
- List of select Jewish boxers
