= Boxing at the 2015 Pan American Games – Qualification =

The following describes the qualification process for boxing at the 2015 Pan American Games.

== Qualification system ==
A total of 120 boxers (96 male and 24 women) will qualify to compete at the games. The top three boxers in each men's category at the 2015 World Series of Boxing will qualify. The rest of the quotas (including all the women's quotas) will be awarded at a qualification tournament in June 2015. Canada as host nation has an automatic berth in one women's and five men's categories, and will need to qualify in all other categories.

== Qualification timeline ==
Event	Date	Venue
World Series of Boxing rankings	April 26, 2015	—N/a
Qualification tournament	June 4–9, 2015	Tijuana, Mexico

== Qualification summary ==
NOC	Men										Women			Total
NOC	49 kg	52 kg	56 kg	60 kg	64 kg	69 kg	75 kg	81 kg	91 kg	91+ kg	51 kg	60 kg	75 kg	Total
Argentina	X			X	X	X		X				X	X	7
Bahamas					X	X				X				3
Barbados								X						1
Bolivia											X			1
Brazil		X	X		X	X		X	X	X			X	8
Canada	X		X		X	X	X		X	X	X	X	X	10
Chile							X		X					2
Colombia	X	X		X			X	X	X		X		X	8
Costa Rica		X			X		X	X						4
Cuba	X	X	X	X	X	X	X	X	X	X				10
Dominica												X		1
Dominican Republic	X	X	X	X		X	X		X			X	X	9
Ecuador			X					X	X					3
El Salvador												X		1
Guatemala	X	X	X	X	X									5
Honduras				X										1
Mexico	X	X		X	X	X	X	X		X	X	X		10
Nicaragua	X		X			X					X			4
Peru			X									X		2
Puerto Rico		X		X			X				X	X		5
Trinidad and Tobago													X	1
United States	X	X	X	X	X	X	X	X		X	X		X	11
Venezuela	X	X	X	X	X	X	X	X	X	X	X		X	12
Virgin Islands										X				1
Total: 24 NOCs	10	10	10	10	10	10	10	10	8	8	8	8	8	120

== Men ==
=== Light flyweight ===
Competition	Vacancies	Qualified
World Series of Boxing	3	Joselito Velázquez (MEX); Joahnys Argilagos (CUB); Yoel Finol Rivas (VEN)
Qualification tournament	7	Junior Zarate (ARG); P.G.Tondo (CAN); Yubergen Martinez (COL); Victor Santillan (DOM); Alvaro Vargas (GUA); Kevin Arias (NCA); Melik Elliston (USA)
Total	10	

=== Flyweight ===
Competition	Vacancies	Qualified
World Series of Boxing	3	Yosbany Veitia (CUB); Jeyvier Cintron (PUR); Yoel Finol Rivas (MEX)
Qualification tournament	7	Julião Henriques (BRA); Ceiber Avila (COL); David Jimenez (CRC); Leonel De Los Santos (DOM); Eddie Valenzuela (GUA); Antonio Vargas (USA); Edward Bermudez (VEN)
Total	10	

=== Bantamweight ===
Competition	Vacancies	Qualified
Host nation	1	Kenny Lally (CAN)
World Series of Boxing	3	Andy Cruz Gomez (CUB); Francisco Martinez (USA); Jose Diaz Azocar (VEN)
Qualification tournament	6	Carlos Andre Dos Santos (BRA); Héctor García (DOM); Segundo Padilla (ECU); Juan Reyes (GUA); Franco Gutiérrez (NCA); Jorvi Ferronan (PER)
Total	10	

=== Lightweight ===
Competition	Vacancies	Qualified
World Series of Boxing	3	Lazaro Alvarez (CUB); Carlos Balderas Jr. (USA); Lindolfo Delgado (MEX)
Qualification tournament	7	Ronan Sanchez (ARG); Fadir Hernandez (COL); Elvis Rodriguez (DOM); Kevin Luna (GUA); Merin Zalazar (HON); José Rosario (PUR); Luis Angel Cabrera (VEN)
Total	10	

=== Light welterweight ===
Competition	Vacancies	Qualified
Host nation	1	Arthur Biyarslanov (CAN)
World Series of Boxing	3	Yasniel Toledo (CUB); Raul Curiel Garcia (MEX); Luis Arcon Diaz (VEN)
Qualification tournament	6	Lucas Gimenez (ARG); Rashield Williams (BAH); Joedison De Jesus (BRA); Eduardo Sanchez (CRC); Carlos Tovar (GUA); Luis Feliciano (USA)
Total	10	

=== Welterweight ===
Competition	Vacancies	Qualified
Host nation	1	Sassan Haghigat-Joo (CAN)
World Series of Boxing	3	Roniel Iglesias (CUB); Gabriel Maestre (VEN); Brian Ceballo (USA)
Qualification tournament	6	Alberto Palmeta (ARG); Carl Hield (BAH); Roberto Custodio (BRA); Juan Ramón Solano (DOM); Marvin Cabrera (MEX); Lester Silva (NCA)
Total	10	

=== Middleweight ===
Competition	Vacancies	Qualified
Host nation	1	Clovis Drolet (CAN)
World Series of Boxing	3	Arlen Lopez Cardona (CUB); Anthony Campbell (USA); Misael Rodriguez Olivas (MEX)
Qualification tournament	6	Joseph Cherkashyn (CHI); Jorge Vivas (COL); Jason Fabian Ramirez (CRC); Raul Sanchez (DOM); Magdiel Cotto (PUR); Endri Saavedra (VEN)
Total	10	

=== Light heavyweight ===
Competition	Vacancies	Qualified
World Series of Boxing	3	Julio La Cruz Peraza (CUB); Albert Ramirez Duran (VEN); Steve Nelson (USA)
Qualification tournament	7	Marcos Escudero (ARG); Adrian Biscette (BAR); Michel De Souza (BRA); Juan Carlos Carrillo (COL); Jose Moya (CRC); Carlos Andreas Mina (ECU); Rogelio Romero (MEX)
Total	10	

=== Heavyweight ===
Competition	Vacancies	Qualified
Host nation	1	Samir El Mais (CAN)
World Series of Boxing	3	Erislandy Savon Cotilla (CUB); Julio Castillo Torres (ECU); Alfonso Flores Millan (VEN)
Qualification tournament	4	Juan Goncalvez (BRA); Miguel Angel Veliz (CHI); Deivis Julio (COL); Joaquín Berroa (DOM)
Total	8	

=== Super heavyweight ===
Competition	Vacancies	Qualified
World Series of Boxing	3	Lenier Pero Justiz (CUB); Edgar Munoz Mata (VEN); Cam Awesome (USA)
Qualification tournament	5	Kieshno Major (BAH); Rafael Duarte (BRA); Simon Kean (CAN); Alberto Edgar Ramirez (MEX); Laurent Clayton (ISV)
Total	8	

== Women ==
=== Flyweight ===
Competition	Vacancies	Qualified
Qualification tournament	8	Nadia Barriga (BOL); Mandy Bujold (CAN); Ingrit Valencia (COL); Sulem Urbina (MEX); Claudia Perrales (NCA); Monica Gonzalez (PUR); Marlen Esparza (USA); Tayonis Cedeno (VEN)
Total	8	

=== Lightweight ===
Competition	Vacancies	Qualified
Qualification tournament	8	Dayana Sanchez (ARG); Caroline Veyre (CAN); Valerian Spicer (DMA); Mirkin Sena (DOM); Karla Herrera (ESA); Victoria Torres (MEX); Stefani Lopez (PER); Kiria Tapia (PUR)
Total	8	

=== Middleweight ===
Competition	Vacancies	Qualified
Host nation	1	Ariane Fortin (CAN)
Qualification tournament	7	Lucia Perez (ARG); Flavia Figueiredo (BRA); Jessica Caicedo (COL); Yenebier Guillen (DOM); Chimere Taylor (TRI); Claressa Shields (USA); Francelis Carmona (VEN)
Total	8	
