= Light middleweight =

Weight class in boxing and kickboxing

Light middleweight, also known as junior middleweight or super welterweight, is a weight class in boxing but also may include other combat sports.

== Boxing ==
The light middleweight division (also known as junior middleweight in the IBF or super welterweight in the WBA and WBC), is a weight division in professional boxing, above 66.7 kg and up to 69.9 kg (147+ to 154 pounds).

=== History ===
This division was established in 1961, when the Austrian Board of Control recognized a fight between Emile Griffith and Teddy Wright for the "world" championship. The fight, which took place on October 17, was won by Griffith via a 15-round decision. Three days later, the World Boxing Association championship was created when Denny Moyer outpointed Joey Giambra. The World Boxing Council recognized the WBA champion as the true division champion until 1975, when it stripped their current champion and sanctioned a fight between Miguel de Oliveira and Jose Duran for the vacant title. De Oliveira won the title over 15 rounds in 1975. The International Boxing Federation crowned its first champion when Mark Medal defeated Earl Hargrove in 1984. The World Boxing Organization crowned its first champion when John David Jackson defeated Lupe Aquino in 1988.

Popular boxers to have held championships in this division were Nino Benvenuti, Canelo Álvarez, Manny Pacquiao, Wilfred Benítez, Sugar Ray Leonard, Miguel Cotto, Thomas Hearns, Mike McCallum, Julian Jackson, Roberto Durán, Terry Norris, Oscar De La Hoya, Floyd Mayweather Jr., Zab Judah and Winky Wright.

=== Current world champions ===
Male champions

Sanctioning Body	Reign Began	Champion	Record	Defenses
WBA	June 27, 2026	Jaron Ennis	36–0 (32 KO, 1NC)	0
WBC	March 30, 2024	Sebastian Fundora	24–1–1 (16 KO)	2
IBF	January 31, 2026	Josh Kelly	19–1–1 (9 KO)	1
WBO	June 27, 2026	Jaron Ennis	36–0 (32 KO, 1NC)	0

Female champions

Sanctioning Body	Reign Began	Champion	Record	Defenses
WBA	September 28, 2024	Mary Spencer	10–2 (6 KO)	1
WBC	November 18, 2023	Ema Kozin	24–1–1 (12 KO)	0
IBF	November 22, 2024	Oshae Jones	9–0 (3 KO)	1
WBO	November 18, 2023	Ema Kozin	24–1–1 (12 KO)	0

=== Current world rankings ===
==== The Ring ====
As of February 15, 2026.

Keys:

C Current The Ring world champion

Rank	Name	Record (W–L–D)	Title(s)
C	vacant		
1	Vergil Ortiz Jr.	24–0 (22 KO)	
2	Sebastian Fundora	24–1–1 (16 KO)	WBC
3	Xander Zayas	23–0 (13 KO)	WBA/WBO
4	Israil Madrimov	11-2-1 (7 KO)	
5	Jaron Ennis	35–0 (31 KO)	
6	Josh Kelly	18-1-1 (9 KO)	IBF
7	Bakhram Murtazaliev	23-1 (17 KO)	
8	Brandon Adams	26-4 (16 KO)	
9	Abass Baraou	17–2 (9 KO)	
10	Bakary Samake	19-0 (11 KO)	

==== BoxRec ====
As of 15 February 2026.

Rank	Name	Record (W–L–D)	Title(s)
1	Jaron Ennis	35–0 (31 KO)	
2	Vergil Ortiz Jr.	24-0 (22 KO)	
3	Xander Zayas	23-0 (13 KO)	WBA/WBO
4	Sebastian Fundora	23-1-1 (15 KO)	WBC
5	Keith Thurman	31–1 (23 KO)	
6	Israil Madrimov	11-2-1 (7 KO)	
7	Josh Kelly	18-1-1 (9 KO)	IBF
8	Bakhram Murtazaliev	23-1 (17 KO)	
9	Bakary Samake	19-0 (11 KO)	
10	Erickson Lubin	27-3 (19 KO)	

== Kickboxing ==
In the International Kickboxing Federation (IKF), Super Welterweight is 147.1 - 153 lb (66.9 - 69.5 kg) & Light Middleweight is 153.1 - 159 lb (69.6 - 72.3 kg).

== Lethwei ==
The World Lethwei Championship recognizes the light middleweight with an upper limit of 71 kg (157 lb). In World Lethwei Championship, Sasha Moisa is the Light middleweight Champion.
