= Sela (company) =

Saudi Arabian entertainment and hospitality company

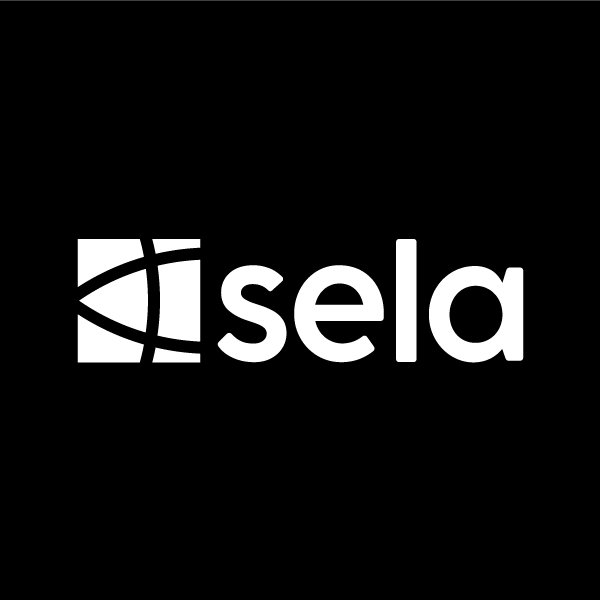
- Formerly: Sela Sport
- Industry: Entertainment and hospitality
- Founded: 1997; 29 years ago
- Headquarters: Jeddah, Saudi Arabia
- Number of locations: 3
- Owner: Public Investment Fund
- Subsidiaries: Zuffa Boxing (60%)
- Website: sela.sa

Sela (Arabic: صلة) is an entertainment and hospitality company specializing in experiences, events, and destinations founded in Saudi Arabia.

Since 1997, Sela has expanded from the sports industry in Saudi Arabia into the entertainment, recreational and culture industries. Sela is owned by the Public Investment Fund, the sovereign wealth fund of Saudi Arabia.

The company has developed and managed entertainment and leisure facilities across Saudi Arabia. In 2010 the company acquired a controlling share of the second New York Cosmos. They sold the controlling interest in the team in 2017, but retained a minority stake.

In 2023 Sela became the primary shirt sponsor for the English football team, Newcastle United F.C., who are also majority owned by PIF, in a multi-year deal.

Following the success of several major events outside of Saudi Arabia, including high-profile international boxing events such as Terence Crawford vs. Israil Madrimov at BMO Stadium, Los Angeles, and Anthony Joshua vs. Daniel Dubois at Wembley Stadium, in March 2025, Sela announced the establishment of their first international office in London.

== Destinations ==
Sela own or manage a number of locations including:

- VIA Riyadh
- Boulevard City
- Boulevard World
- Riyadh Exhibition and Conference Center
- Jeddah Superdome
- Jeddah Yacht Club and Marina
- Jeddah Promenade

== Sponsorships ==
=== Football ===
- (England) Newcastle United F.C. (2023–24 season onwards)

== Sela Studios ==
Sela expanded into film-production infrastructure through Al-Hisn Big Time Studios, a media-city complex near Riyadh designed, planned and built by ARRI and Sela. The complex was commissioned by the General Entertainment Authority and inaugurated by Turki Alalshikh in November 2024. In October 2025, ARRI announced that Al-Hisn Big Time Studios had received ARRI Stage Accreditation for its virtual-production stage.

The complex covers 300,000 square metres and includes several studio buildings with 10,500 square metres of studio space, a 150,000-square-metre backlot village, production offices, editing rooms and other production facilities.

Sela Studios produced the 2026 Saudi Arabian action film 7 Dogs, which was sponsored by the General Entertainment Authority and Riyadh Season. During filming in Riyadh on August 29 2025, Sela Studio achieved two Guinness World Records for film stunt explosions: the largest film stunt explosion and the most high explosives detonated in a single film take.
