= Boulevard City =

Entertainment zone in Riyadh, Saudi Arabia

Boulevard City بوليفارد سيتي
- Previously known as Blvd Riyadh City

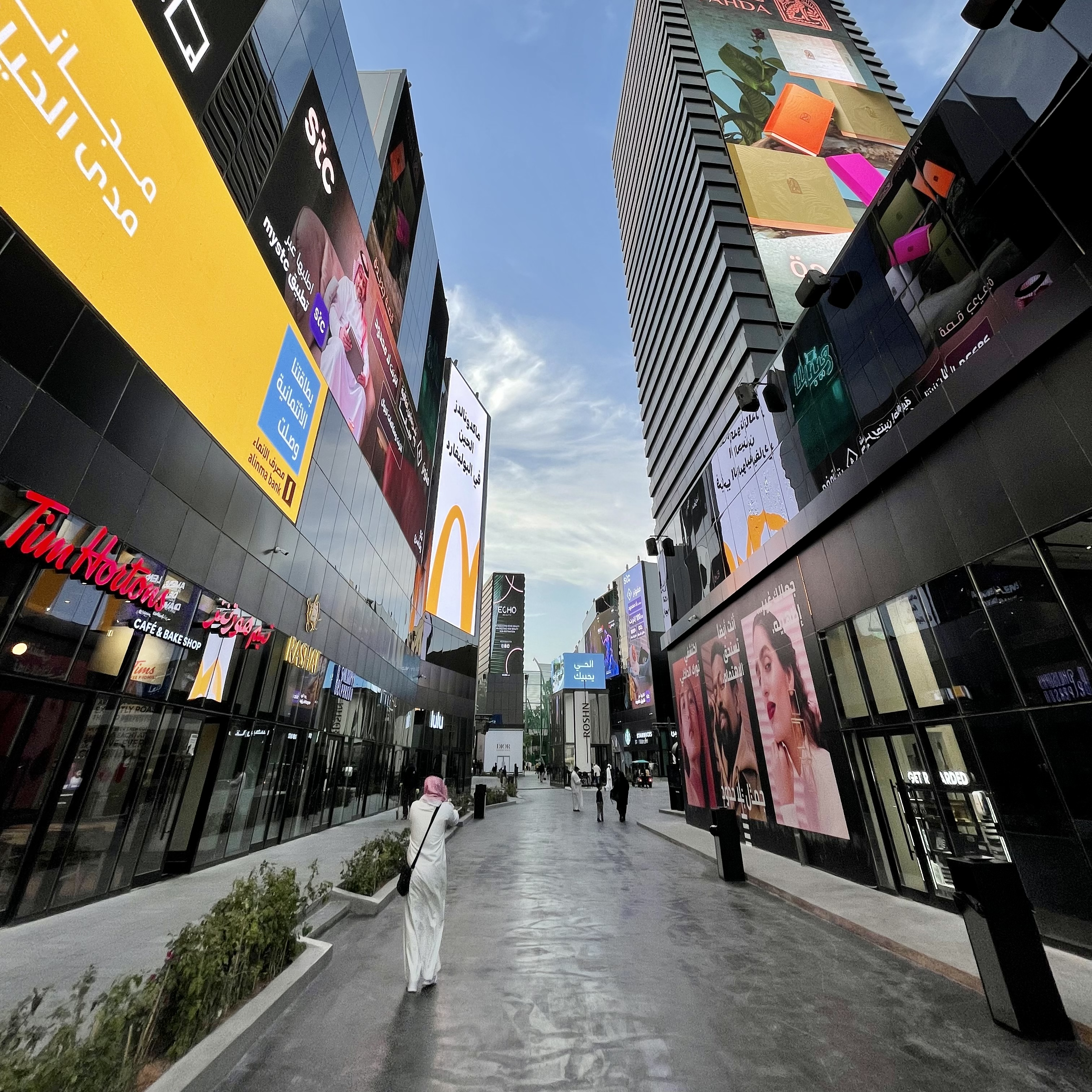
- The Square sub-zone in Boulevard City, inspired by Times Square in Manhattan, New York
- Interactive map of Boulevard City بوليفارد سيتي
- Location: Prince Turki al-Awwal Road, Hittin, Riyadh 13513, Saudi Arabia
- Coordinates: 24°45′1″N 46°36′48″E
- Opened: 17 October 2019; 6 years ago
- Operated by: General Entertainment Authority; National Events Center; Sela Entertainment
- Operating season: Riyadh Season
- Area: 900,000 square metres (220 acres)
- Website: riyadhseason.com/en-US/zone/boulevard-city

The Boulevard City (also spelled Blvd City; Arabic: بوليفارد سيتي, romanized: Būlīfārd Sītī), formerly Boulevard Riyadh City (Arabic: جادّة مدينة الرياض) and simply known as the Boulevard, is a 220-acre (89 ha) mixed-use development at the Prince Turki al-Awwal Road in the Hittin neighborhood of Riyadh, Saudi Arabia, containing high-end retail and entertainment outlets. Opened in 2019, it operates primarily during the annual Riyadh Season entertainment festival. It has lent its name to the adjacent Boulevard World complex, which was inaugurated in 2022.

== Overview ==
First launched in October 2019 in the initial weeks of the 2019 Riyadh Season, it is divided into nine sub-zones that include a wide range of recreational facilities, including outdoor cinemas, cafes, restaurants, and hookah lounges, besides hosting multiple sports, music and theatrical events. The Boulevard is popular for its several landmark attractions like Square sub-zone, a replica of New York's Times Square, Takenda centre and the London's Coventry Street inspired Trocadero area. It was designed by Saudi engineer Abdul Mohsen Al-Theyab, Nmr Real Estate and Ahmed Zaidan Consulting Architects (EdgeArch). It is overseen by the country's General Entertainment Authority.

== History ==
=== Riyadh Season 2019 timeline ===
The Boulevard was launched as a 400,000-square-metre (4,300,000 sq ft) entertainment zone on October 17, 2019, during the first week of the 2019 edition of Riyadh Season. An inaugural parade was held which saw more than 1,500 performers and 25 floats taking part in it. Saudi Gazette reported that within 24 hours of its inauguration, the complex saw more than 1.2 million residents of Riyadh and from nearby Gulf countries flocking to the Boulevard. In late October 2019, the Boulevard hosted The Color Run 'The Happiest 5k on the Planet', where runners sprinted for 5 kilometers and were splashed with different colored powders during each kilometer. The Boulevard hosted the Saudi Anime Expo between 14 and 16 November 2019 which saw several performances of prominent singers and bands in various concerts, including that of late Sami Clark and the Japanese music group Linked Horizon.

In mid-November 2019, Crown Prince Mohammed bin Salman issued directives for the extension of Riyadh Season till the end of January 2020 in selected zones that were attracting more visitors, meanwhile the Boulevard being the only exceptional zone to be extended till the end of March 2020 due to its soaring popularity. In late November 2019, the Boulevard hosted an event in cooperation with the Saudi National Retirees Association in which elderly visitors were encouraged to participate in a walkathon.

In December 2019, the General Entertainment Authority chairman Turki al-Sheikh announced through his official Twitter handle that the Filipino boy band TNT Boys along with Ogie Alcasid and Lara Maigue will be performing at the Mohammed Abdo Theater in an event dubbed 'Filipino Night'. The Boulevard hosted the professional wrestling event of 2020 WWE Super ShowDown at the Mohammed Abdo Arena, which would be the third and last event in the Super ShowDown chronology. On 7 March 2020, the General Entertainment Authority announced the indefinite closure of the Boulevard along with other zones of Riyadh Season over concerns of the spread of novel coronavirus disease. Three days later, the WHO declared coronavirus a global pandemic and King Salman ordered a three-week nationwide curfew on 23 March, bringing an end to the last zone of Riyadh Season.

==== Criticism ====
Just five days after the inauguration of The Boulevard, Arab News reported that residents of the Hittin neighborhood expressed their grievances on social media regarding the overcrowding of the locality by visitors and tourists, disrupting the traffic and tranquility of their daily life. Some of the social media users asked the country's traffic department as well as the General Entertainment Authority to come up with a solution.

=== WWE Crown Jewel ===
The Boulevard's Mohammed Abdo Arena hosted the professional wrestling event of 2021 WWE Crown Jewel on October 21, which saw 22,000 attendees.

=== Riyadh Season 2021 timeline ===
A giant rotating LED globe in Boulevard Riyadh

The Boulevard was reopened as a 900,000 square meter entertainment zone on November 1, 2021 as part of the second edition of Riyadh Season festival in the post-relaxation of COVID-19 lockdown in the country. In November 2021, Sala Entertainment announced the opening of the largest indoor entertainment city 'Sala Hub'. In the second week of November 2021, the Takenda Center was inaugurated which featured 500 arcade games and virtual reality besides offering a distinctive karaoke experience. In mid-November 2021, The Boulevard unveiled 'The Crystal Maze' experience, based on the British game show The Crystal Maze.

During the second week of December 2021, Indian Bollywood actor Salman Khan travelled to Riyadh as part of his 'Da-Bangg Tour' and performed at the International Arena Boulevard Plus alongside Shilpa Shetty, Prabhu Deva, Aayush Sharma, Guru Randhawa and Saiee Manjrekar. Before the event, Khan's handprints were added to the 'Wall of Fame'. In late December 2021, the Boulevard inaugurated the biggest bowling alley in Saudi Arabia, with an area over 2,500 square meter.

In early January 2022, the General Entertainment Authority revised The Boulevard's entry timings by 3 hours by letting the visitors enter the precincts from 2 pm (UTC+03:00) instead of 5 pm.

=== Ramadan and Eid ul-Fitr 2022 ===
The Boulevard announced free entry throughout the month of Ramadan in April 2022. The Boulevard hosted a Gargee'an show in the Studio area between 14 and 16 April 2022, an Eastern Arabian semiannual celebration, observed primarily during mid-Ramadan in Gulf countries like Kuwait and Saudi Arabia. In late April 2022, columnist Saeed Saeed reported in the Abu Dhabi-based The National that "Boulevard Riyadh has become a family hub during Ramadan". By the end of April 2022, the Boulevard hosted the Eid ul-Fitr parade in its precincts to observe the festival of Eid ul-Fitr.

=== Pre-2022 Riyadh Season ===
In July 2022, the Boulevard inaugurated the Japamura zone, a village that exhibits Japanese culture in preparation for the Gamers8 fest (renamed to Esports World Cup after the 2023 edition, which is still held in Boulevard City) as well as the upcoming 2022 edition of Riyadh Season. The initiative was supported by Saudi Airlines.

== Subzones ==
The Square, 2022

The Boulevard has nine sub-zones. These include:

- The musical fountain or dancing fountain
- The Square, a replica of New York's Times Square
- The Garden
- Trocadero Area, inspired by London's Coventry Street
- Music Area
- Avalanche Area
- Theaters Area
- Studio Area
- Sport Area

== Popular restaurants and cafes ==
Layali Adan (transl. Aden nights), a Yemeni restaurant and hookah lounge, April 2022

Popular restaurants with cuisines
| Restaurant | Cuisine |
|---|---|
| La Maison De Katrin (Arabic: مطعم لا ميزون دي كاترين) | Greek, French and Mediterranean |
| Public (Arabic: مطعم ببلك) | Italian |
| Kasbah (Arabic: مطعم قصبة) | Moroccan |
| Jinji Korean (Arabic: مطعم جينجي الكوري) | Korean |
| Relais de l'Entrecote (Arabic: مطعم لو روليه دو لانتركوت) | French |
| Zodiac Garden (Arabic: مطعم زودياك) | European and Italian |
| Layali Adan (Arabic: مطعم ليالي عدن) | Yemeni |
| Layali al-Mahrousa (Arabic: ليالي المحروسة) | Egyptian |
| Bettys Café (Arabic: بتي كافيه) | Lebanese |
| O by Michel Fadel (Arabic: مطعم او باي ميشيل فاضل) | Lebanese |
| Zaatar W Zeit (Arabic: زعتر وزيت) | Lebanese |
| Karak Gholam (Arabic: كرك غلام) | Indian |
| Kyokusen (Arabic: كيو كوسين) | Japanese |
| Lokma Istanbul (Arabic: لقمه اسطنبول) | Turkish |
| Morini (Arabic: مطعم موريني) | Italian |
| Samad Iraqi (Arabic: مطعم صمد العراقي) | Iraqi |
| Le Chalet (Arabic: لو شاليه) | Swiss |
| Layali Shameiah (Arabic: مطعم ليالي شامية) | Levantine |

== See also ==
- List of tourist attractions in Riyadh
- Riyadh Season
- Kingdom Arena
- Boulevard World
- VIA Riyadh
