= Boulevard World =

Theme park in Riyadh, Saudi Arabia

Boulevard World بوليفارد وورلد

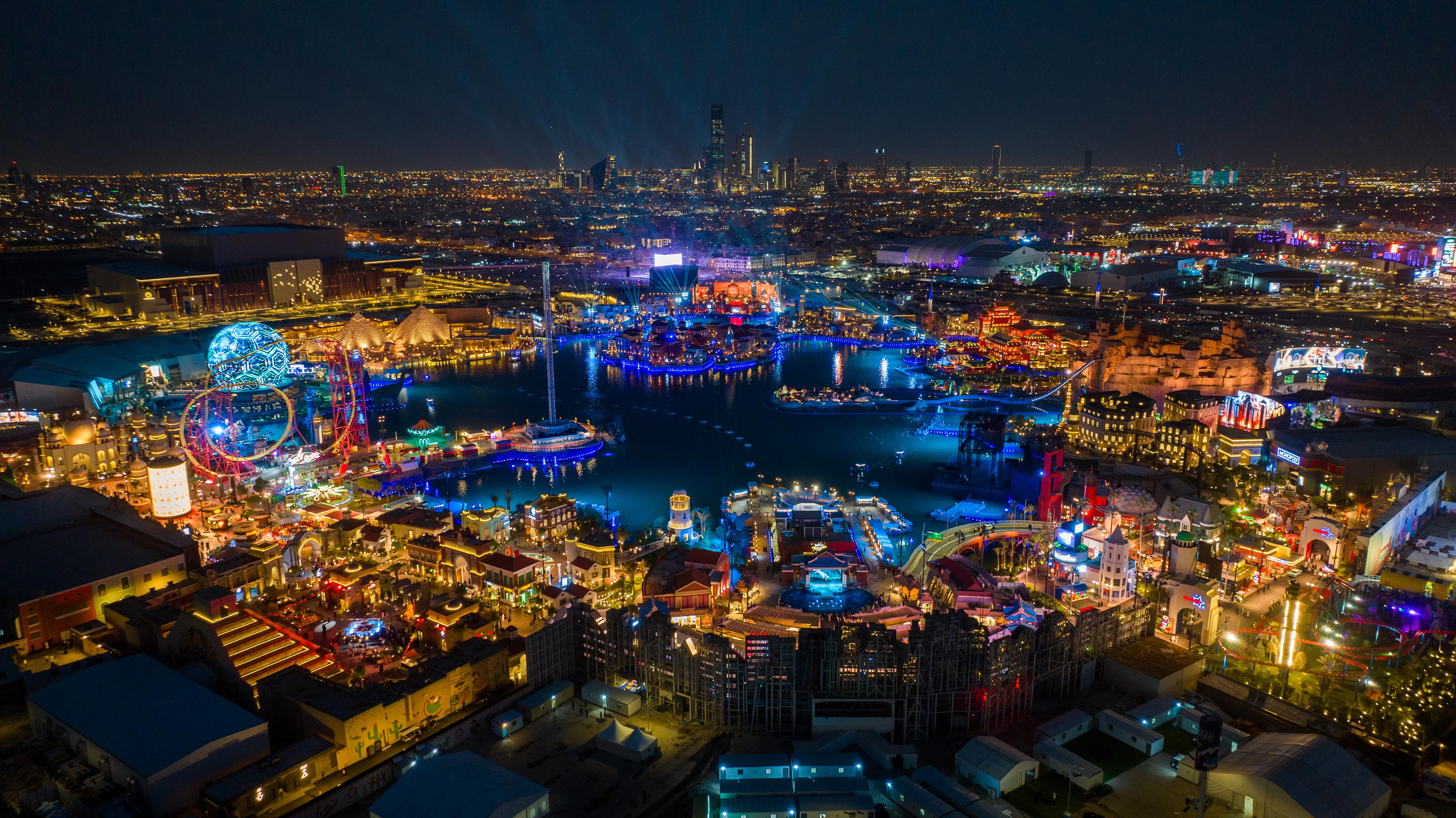
- Boulevard World, 2023
- Interactive map of Boulevard World بوليفارد وورلد
- Location: Riyadh, Saudi Arabia
- Coordinates: 24°46′26″N 46°36′9″E
- Status: Operating
- Opened: 21 November 2022; 3 years ago
- Operated by: Sela
- Operating season: Riyadh Season

Attractions
- Total: 30
- Roller coasters: 3 (2 accredited as proper roller coasters and 1 disputed)

Boulevard World (also BLVD World; Arabic: بوليفارد وورلد) is an amusement park situated at the Prince Turki al-Awwal Road in the Hittin neighborhood of Riyadh, Saudi Arabia, located adjacent to Boulevard City. Opened in November 2022, it operates primarily during the annual Riyadh Season entertainment festival and features replicas of iconic landmarks from several countries. Besides being a high-end miniature park, it also features the world’s largest man-made lagoon, with an area of approximately 12 hectares (0.12 km^{2}). So far, Riyadh Season 2024 at Boulevard World attracted 6 million visitors since its opening on October 12.

Similar to Qiddiya City, which is under construction, Boulevard World is one of the few amusement parks supported by Saudi Vision 2030 to make Saudi Arabia the entertainment capital of the world and diversify its economy away from oil.

== Overview ==
Boulevard World was first introduced in October 2022 when the chairman of General Entertainment Authority Turki bin Abdul Mohsen al-Sheikh posted a three-minute trailer of the entertainment zone on his official Twitter handle.

=== Riyadh Season 2022 ===
Boulevard World was inaugurated on 21 November 2022 during the first edition of Riyadh Season, making it the season's largest zone. The inauguration coincided with the commencement of the 2022 FIFA World Cup in Qatar. The zone showcases recreated replicas of several landmarks from ten countries in its eleven sub-zones, that include United States, France, Italy, Morocco, Greece, India, China, Japan, Spain and Mexico. In December 2022, Saudi Gazette reported that the Lagoon Lake in Boulevard World made into the Guinness World Records as the largest artificial lake in the world with an area of 12.19 hectares and a height of 33.7 meters. In January 2023, Turki Al-Sheikh announced the extension of Boulevard World by the end of March 2023, a move similar to the extension of Boulevard Riyadh City in 2019 which was made by Crown Prince Mohammed bin Salman due to its soaring popularity. Boulevard World hosted the Saudi Founding Day, a national holiday to commemorate the establishment of the First Saudi State in 1727. On 22 March 2023, Boulevard World concluded services for the 2022 edition of Riyadh Season and temporarily ceased operations.

== Countries represented ==
There are dozens of culturally-oriented subzones in Boulevard World.

- Saudi Arabia
- Italy
- United States
- France (including Courchevel)
- Morocco
- Greece
- India
- China
- Japan
- Indonesia
- South Korea
- Kuwait
- Spain
- Mexico
- Egypt
- Thailand
- Turkey
- Iran

=== Levant ===
- Syria
- Lebanon
- Palestine
- Jordan

=== Africa ===
- Kenya
- Uganda

=== Amazonia ===
- Brazil
- Peru

== Gallery ==
=== Saudi Arabia zone ===
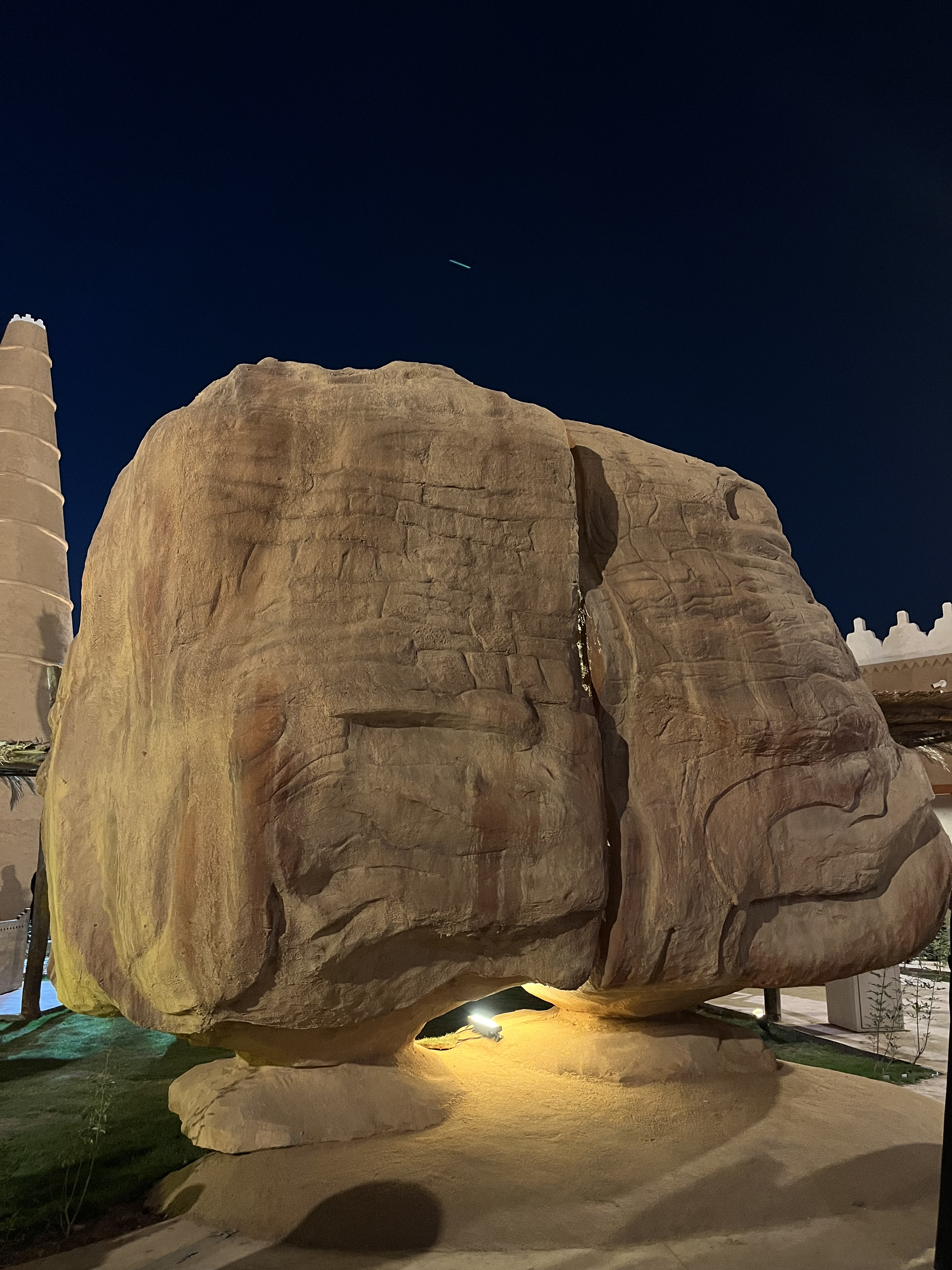
Al Naslaa rock formation from Tayma oasis

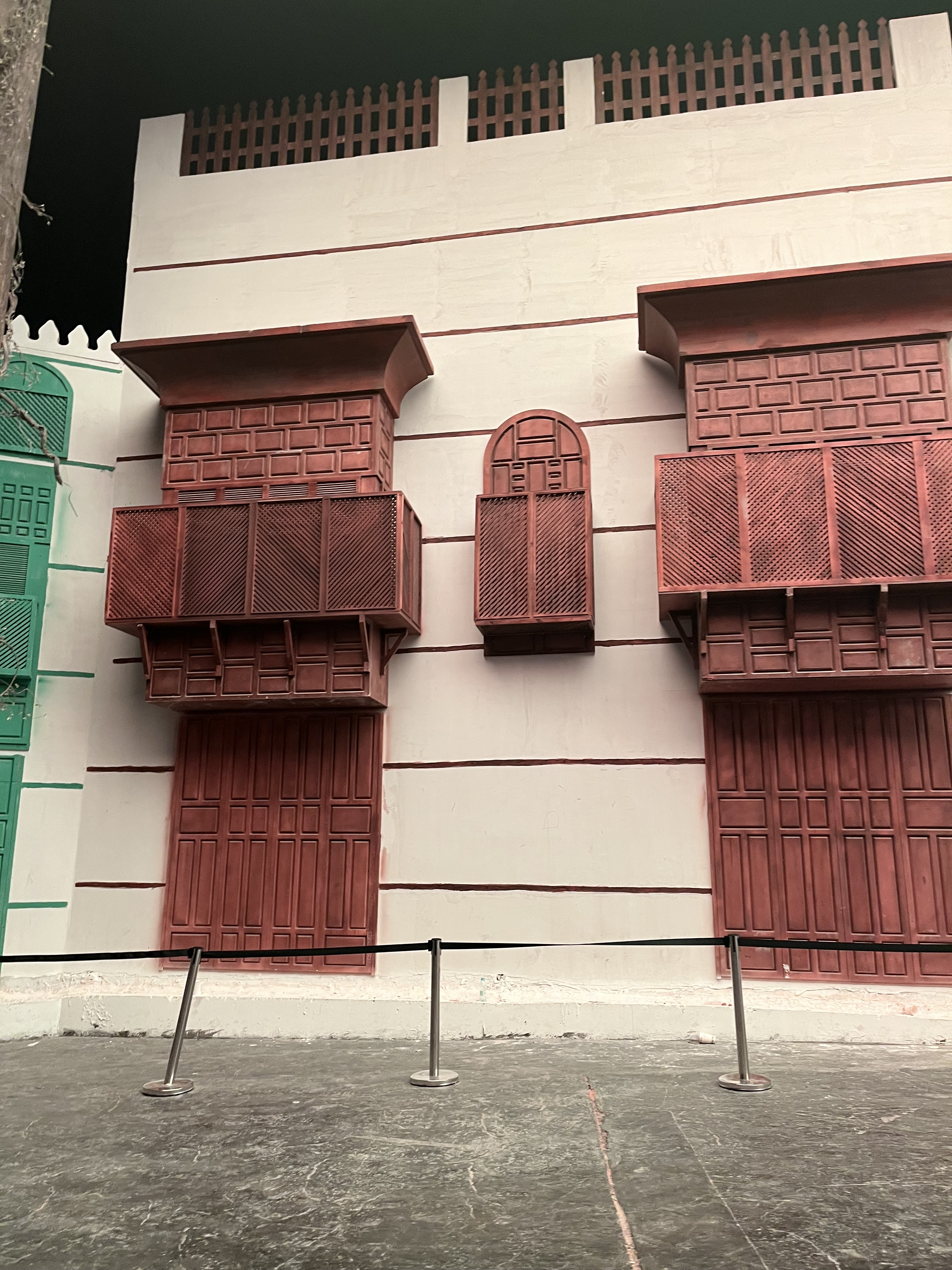
Houses of Al Balad district of Jeddah

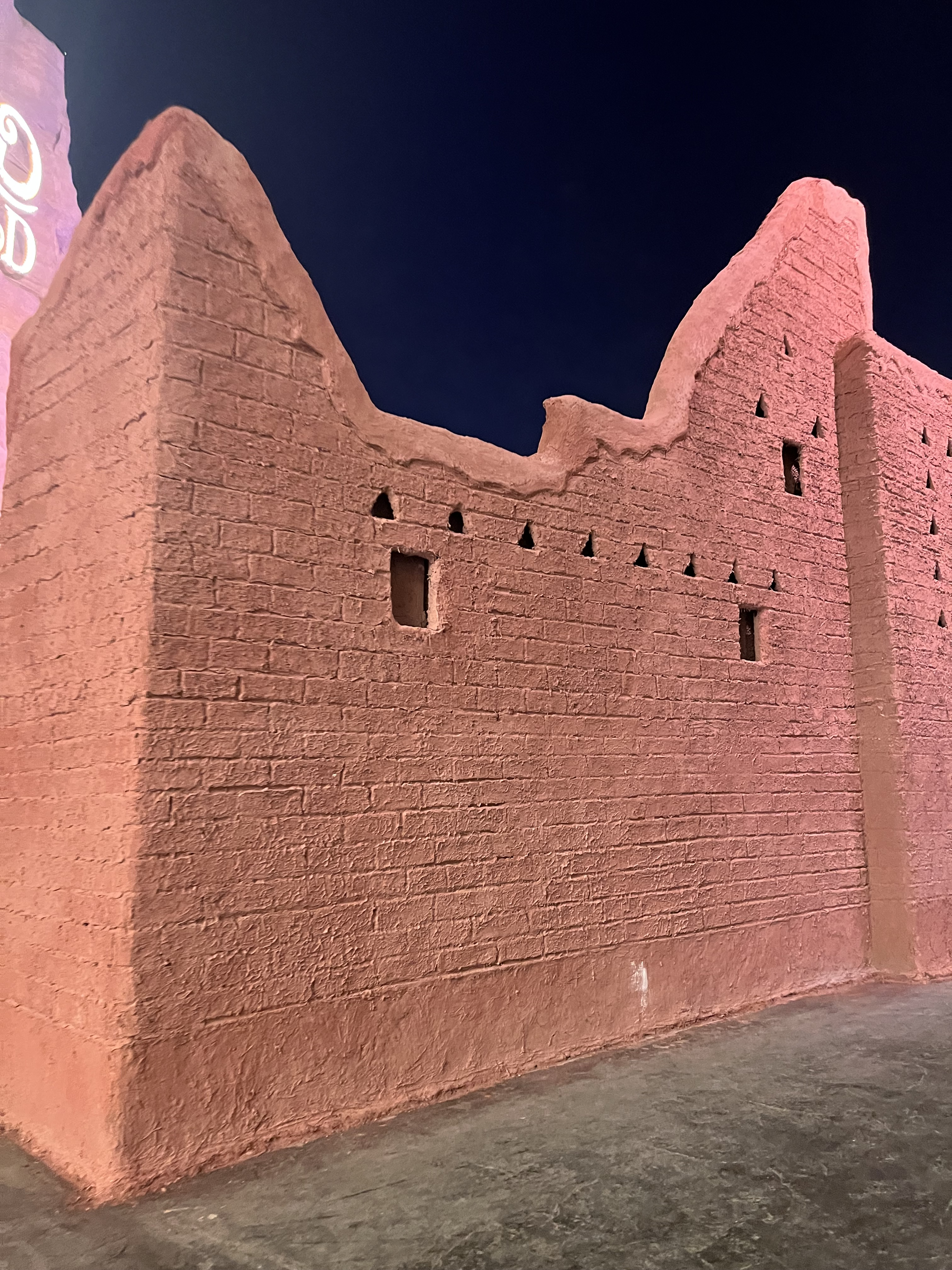
Salwa Palace of At-Turaif District of Diriyah

=== China zone ===
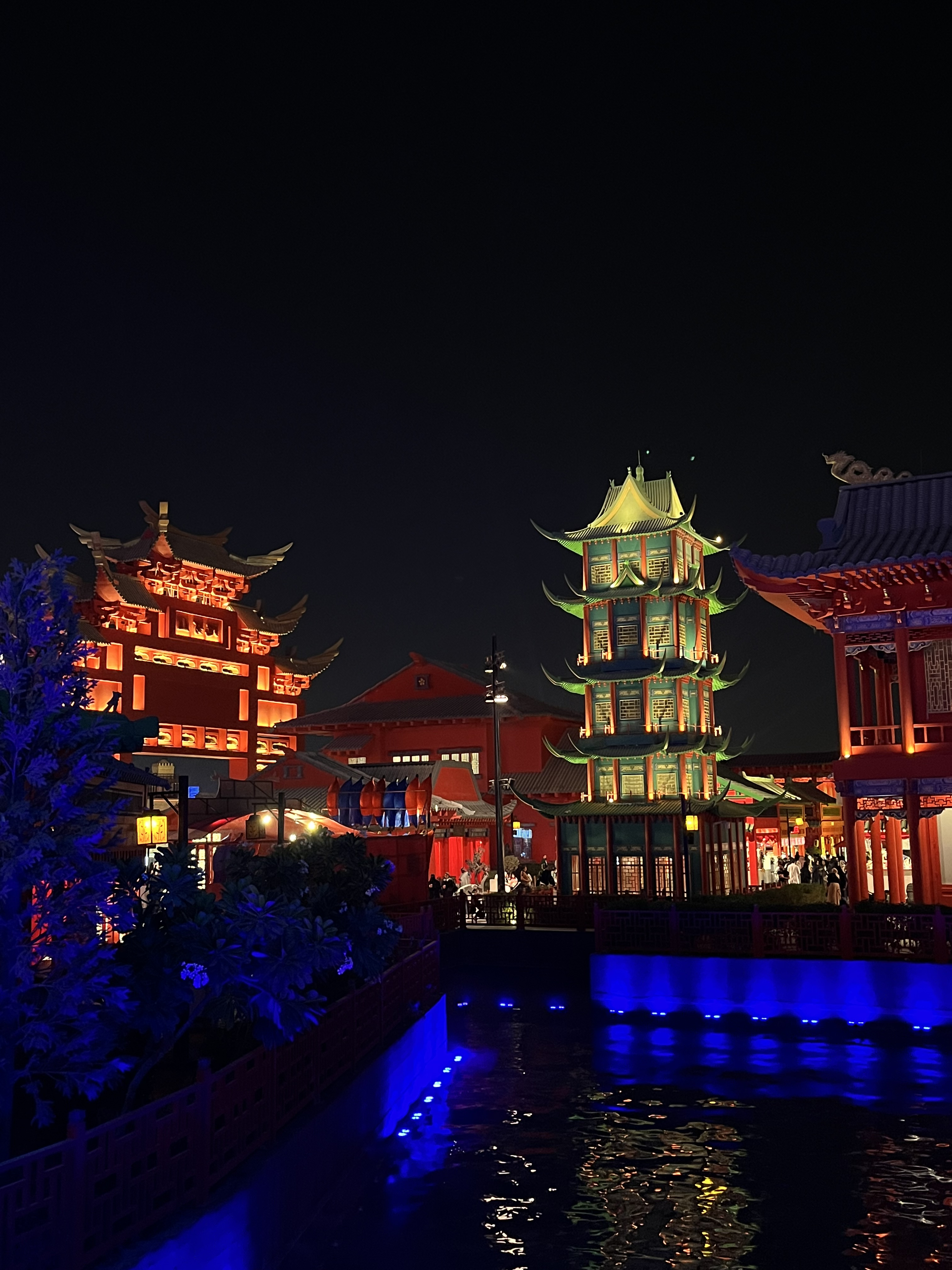
Pagoda inspired tower replicas

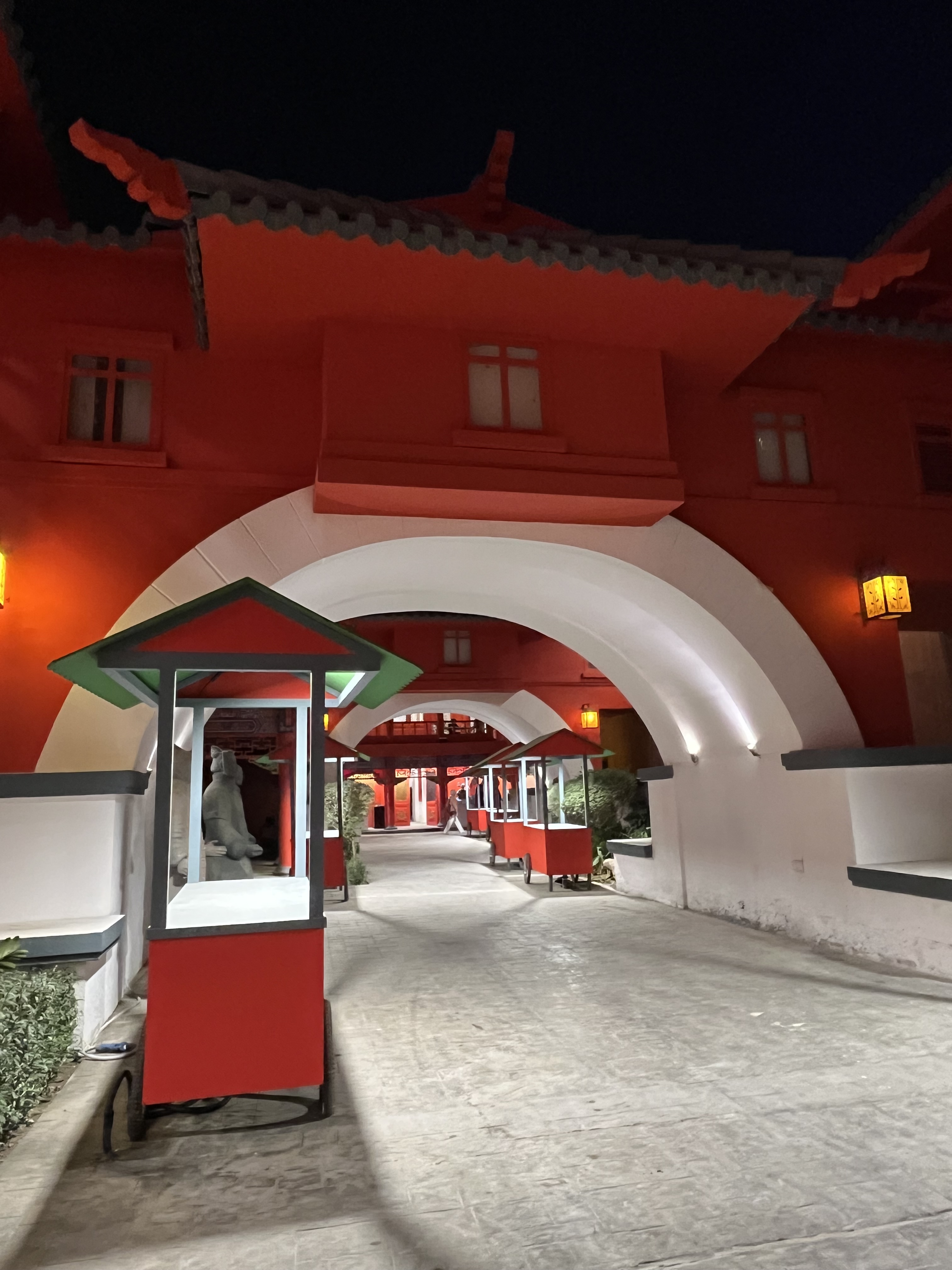
Paifang style archway

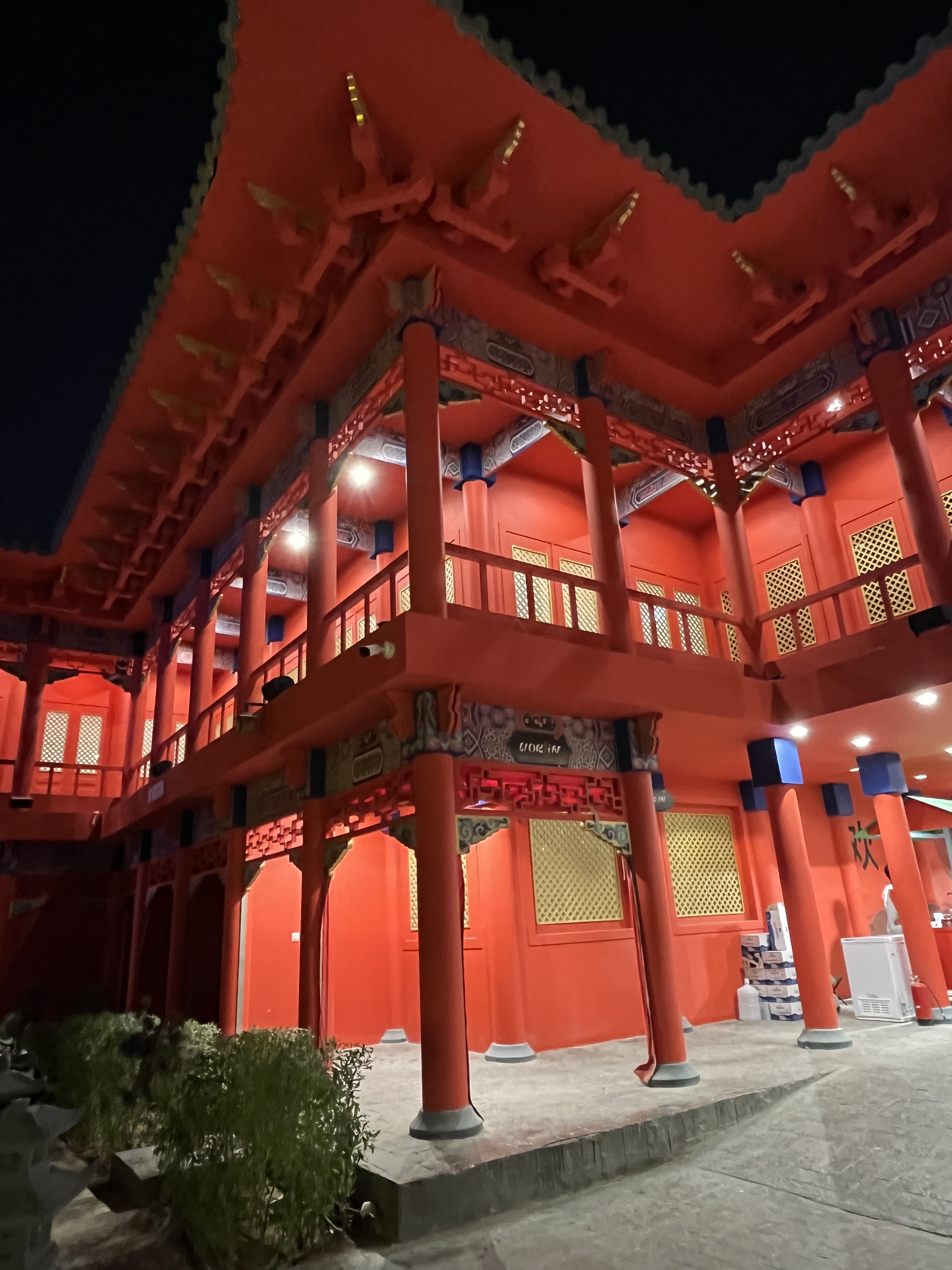
Traditionally inspired building

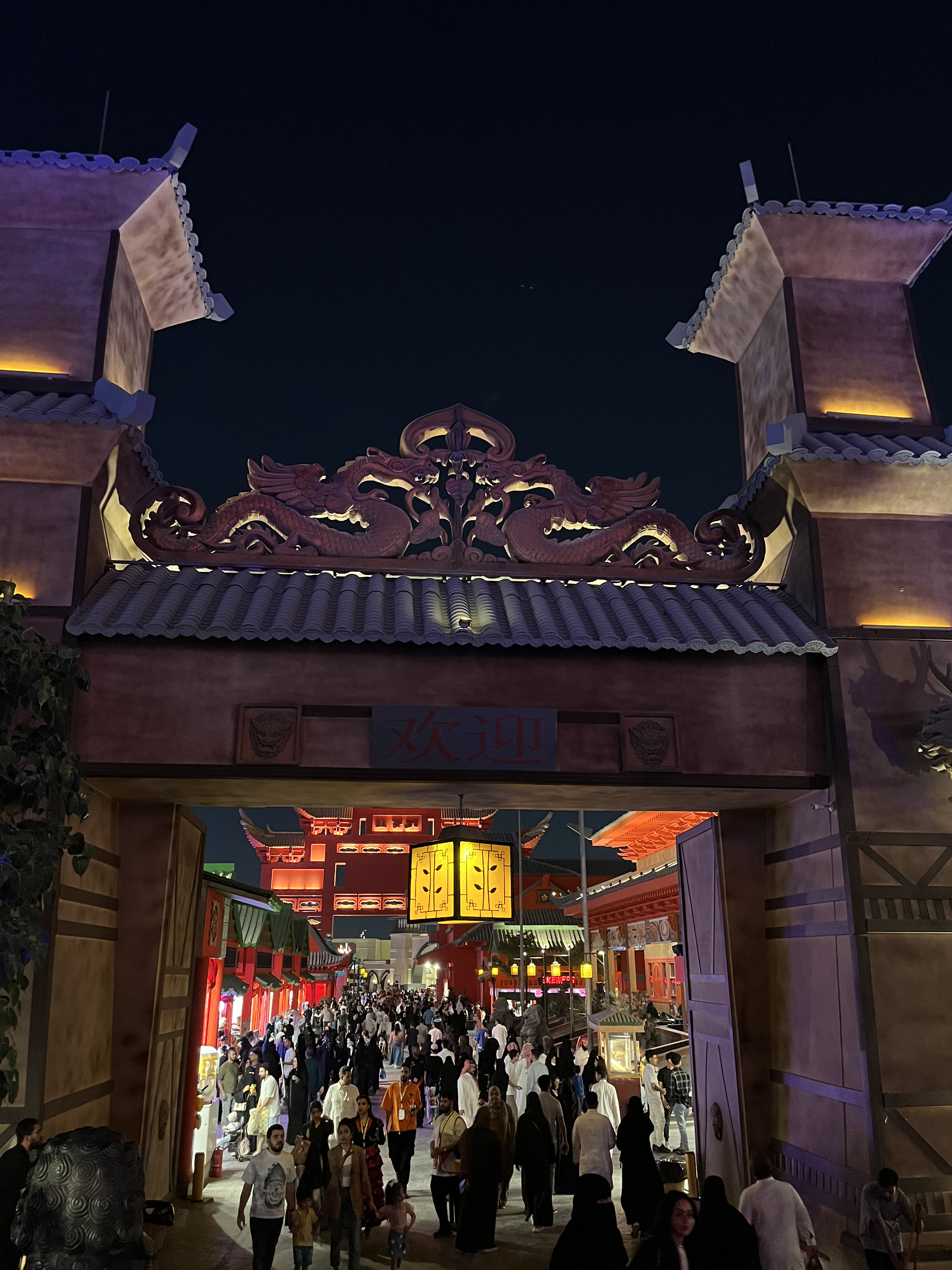
Traditional gate with dragon motifs

=== France zone ===
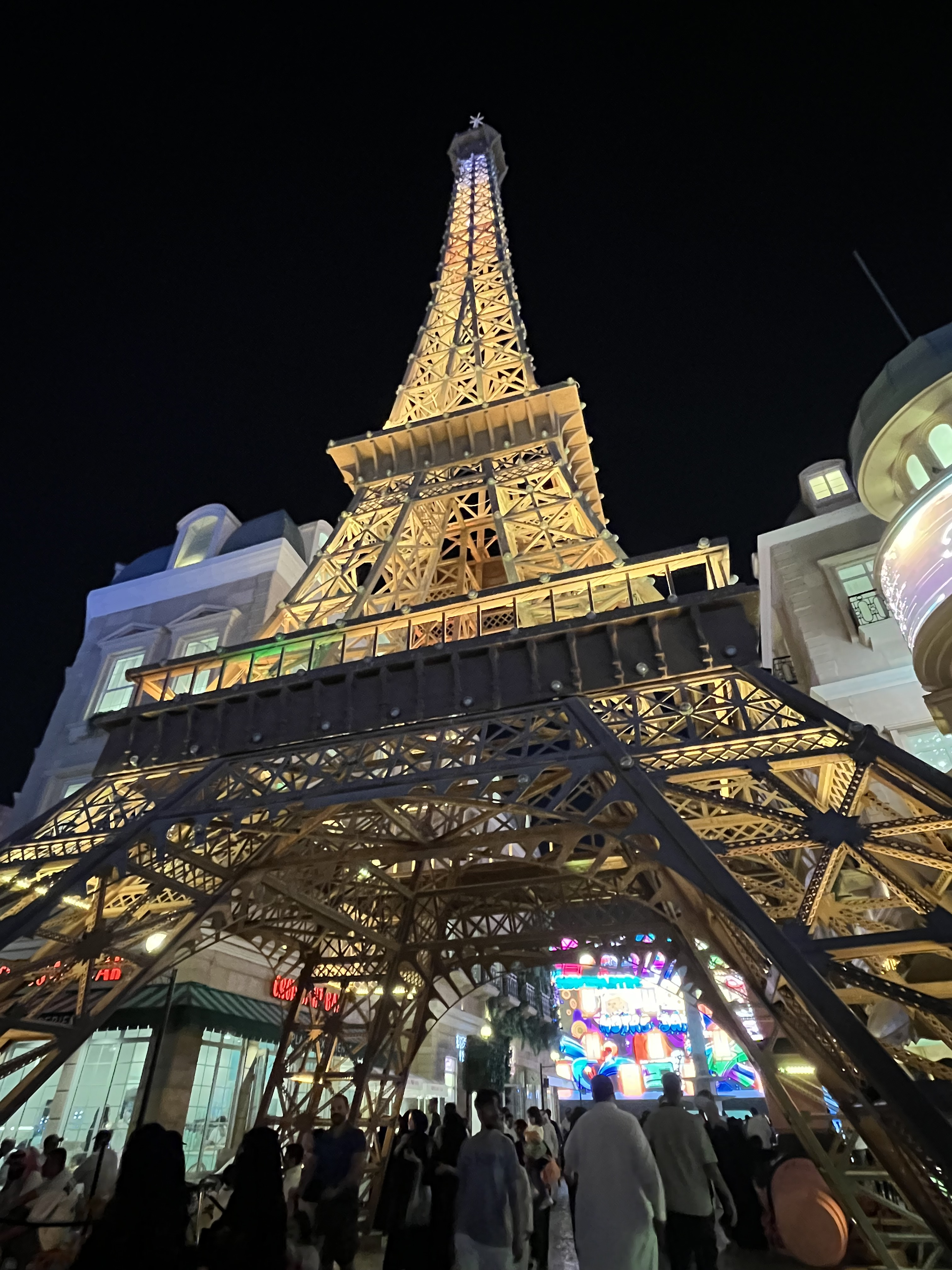
Eiffel Tower

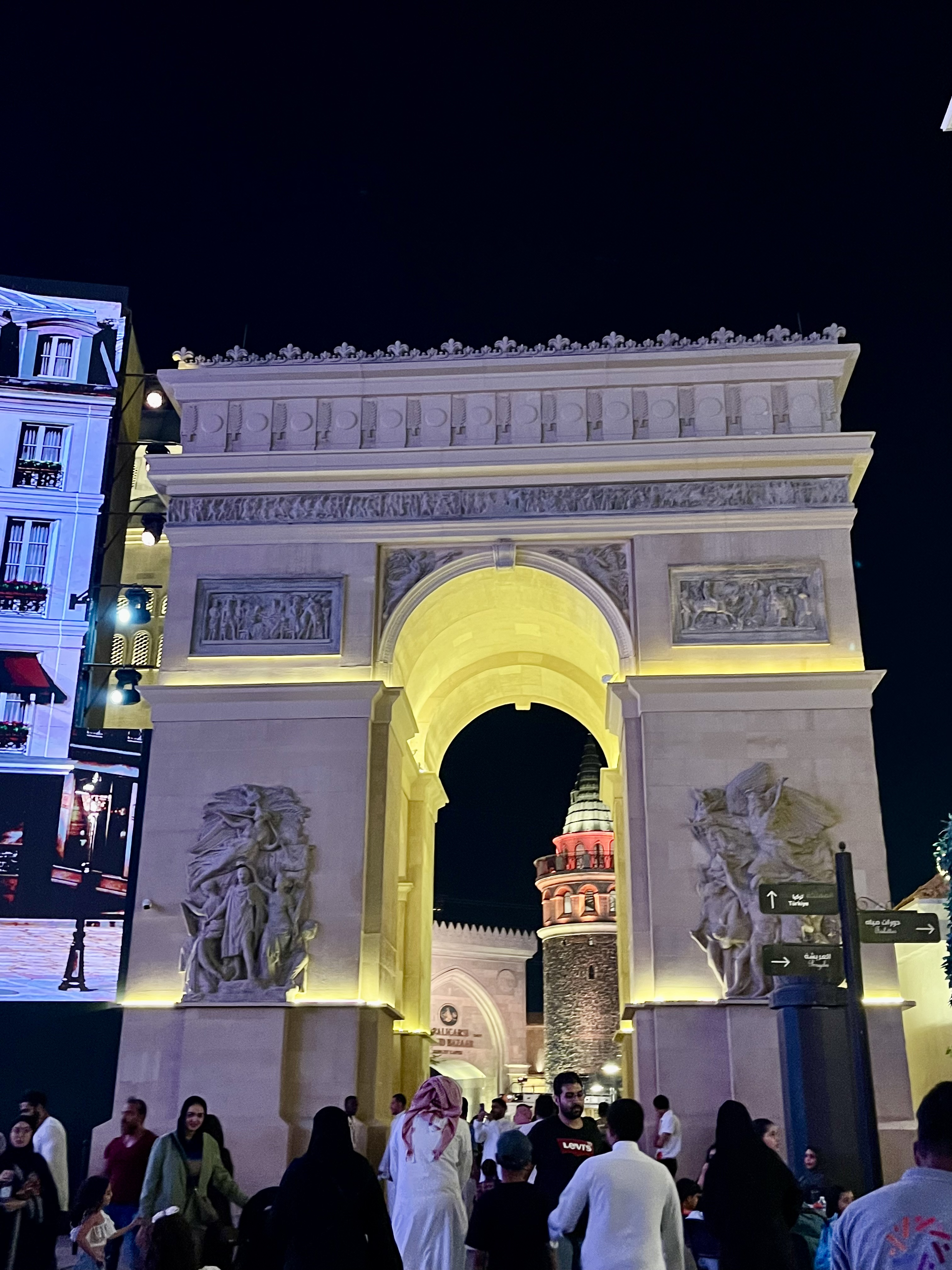
Arc de Triomphe

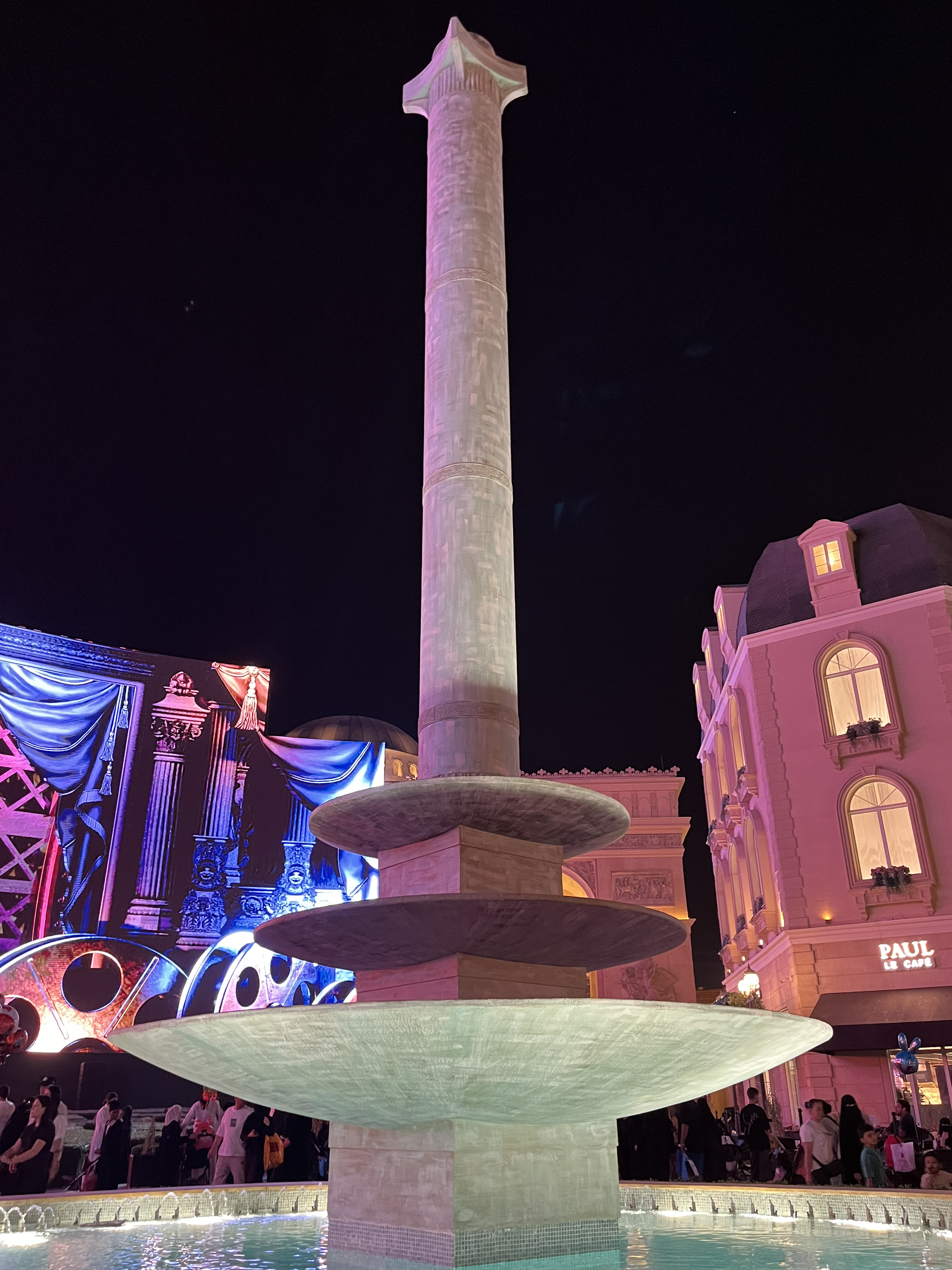
A replica of a typical French fountain

=== Egypt zone ===
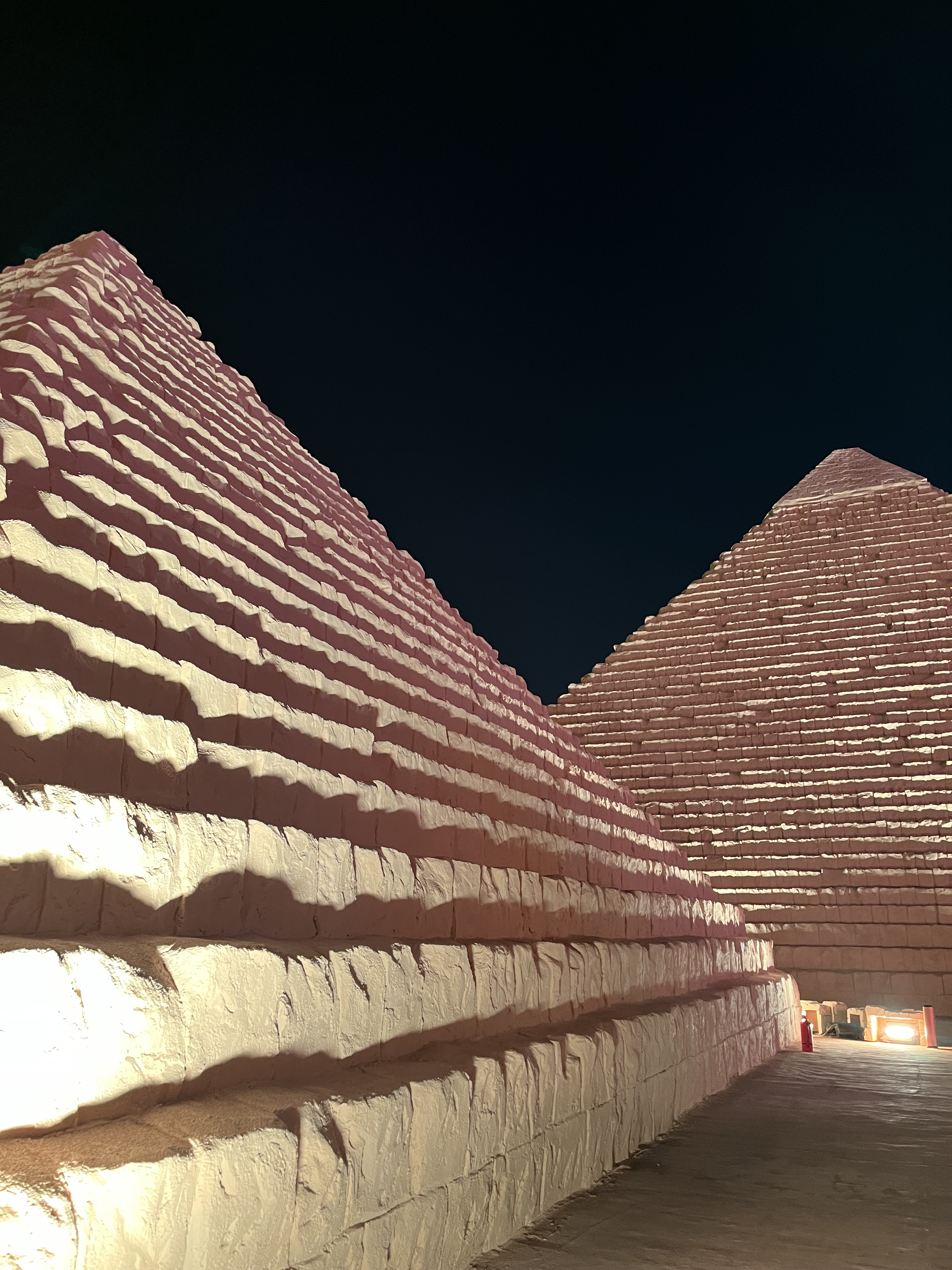
Great Pyramids of Giza

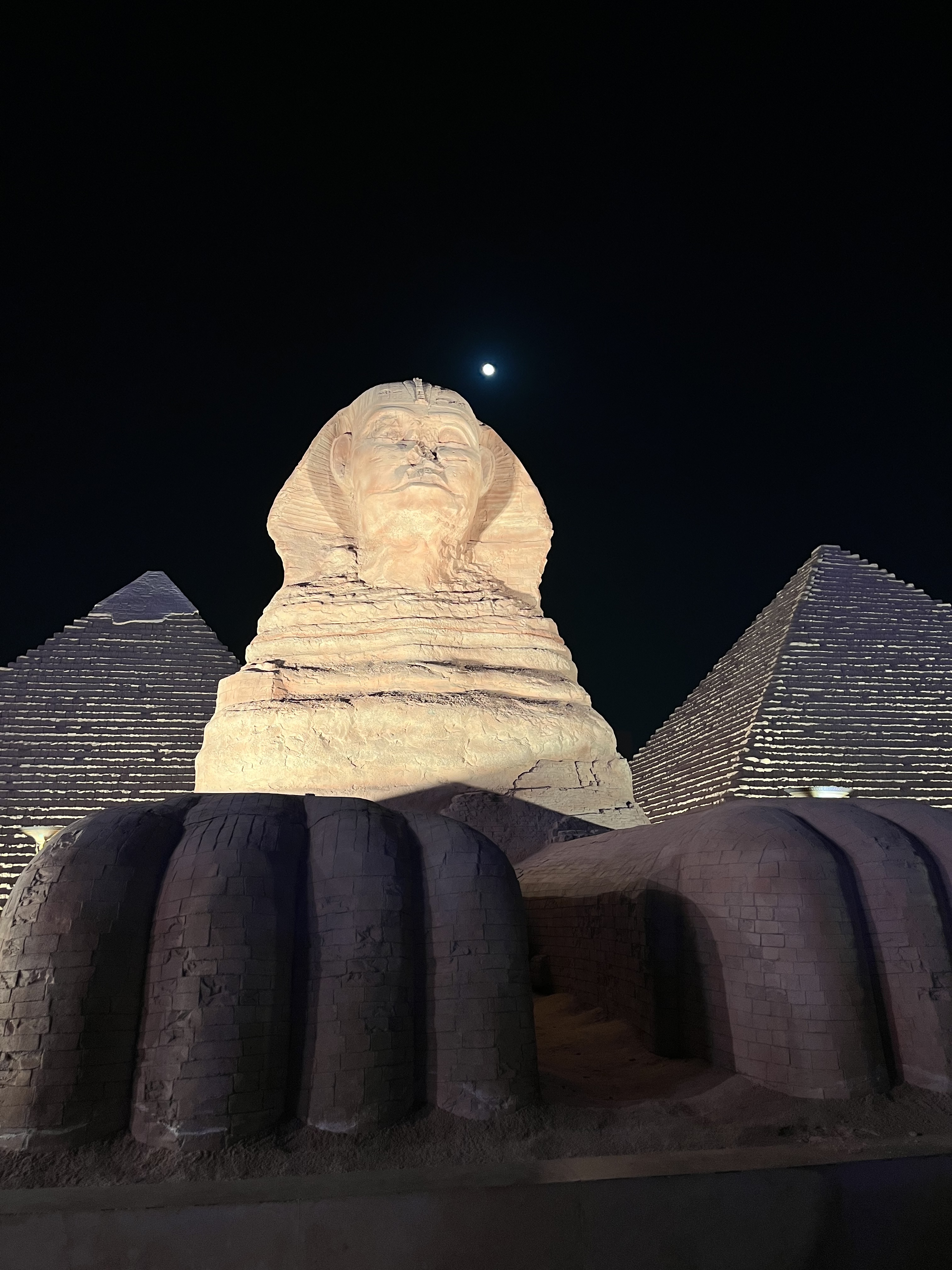
The Great Sphinx of Giza

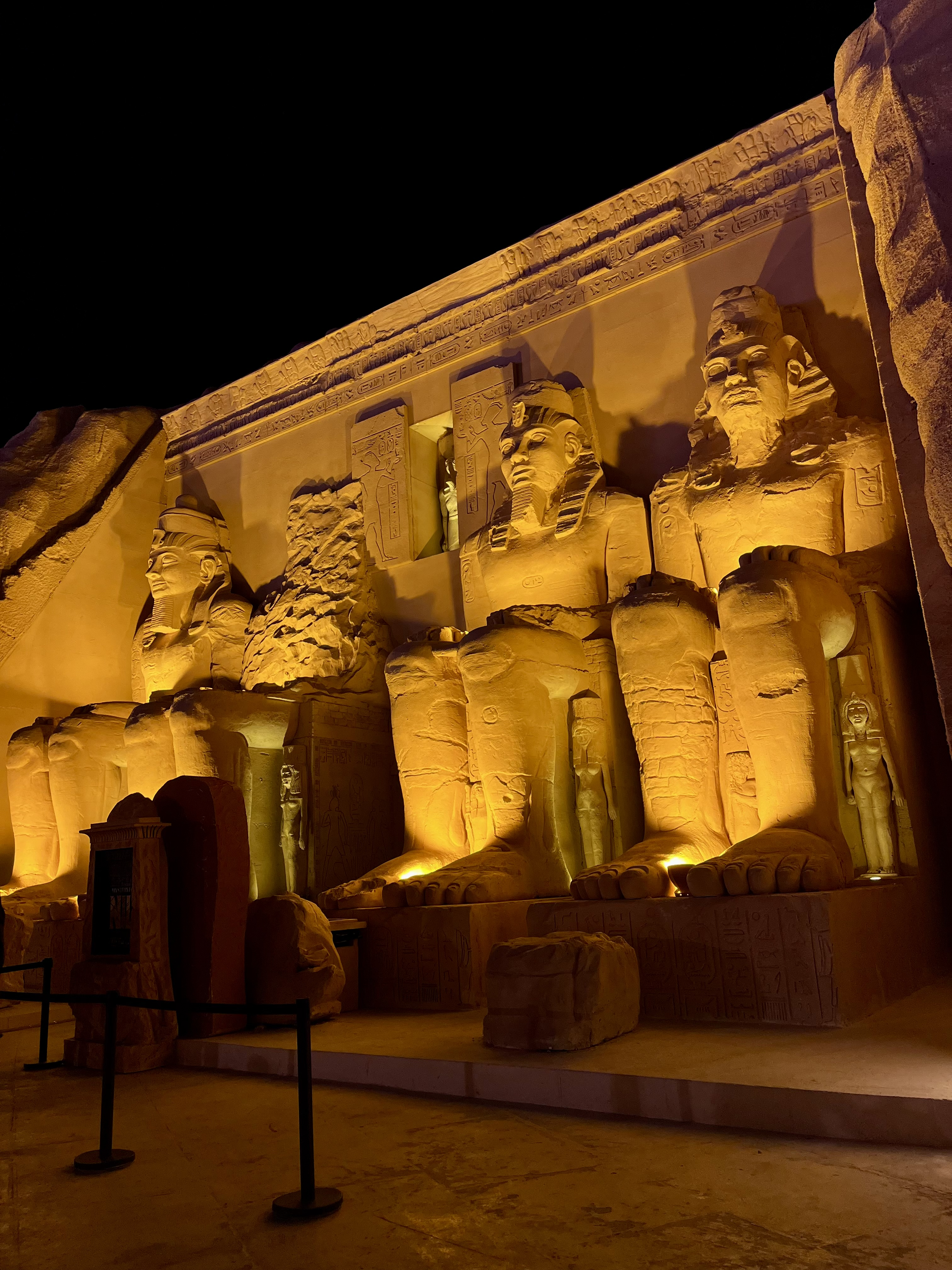
Abu Simbel

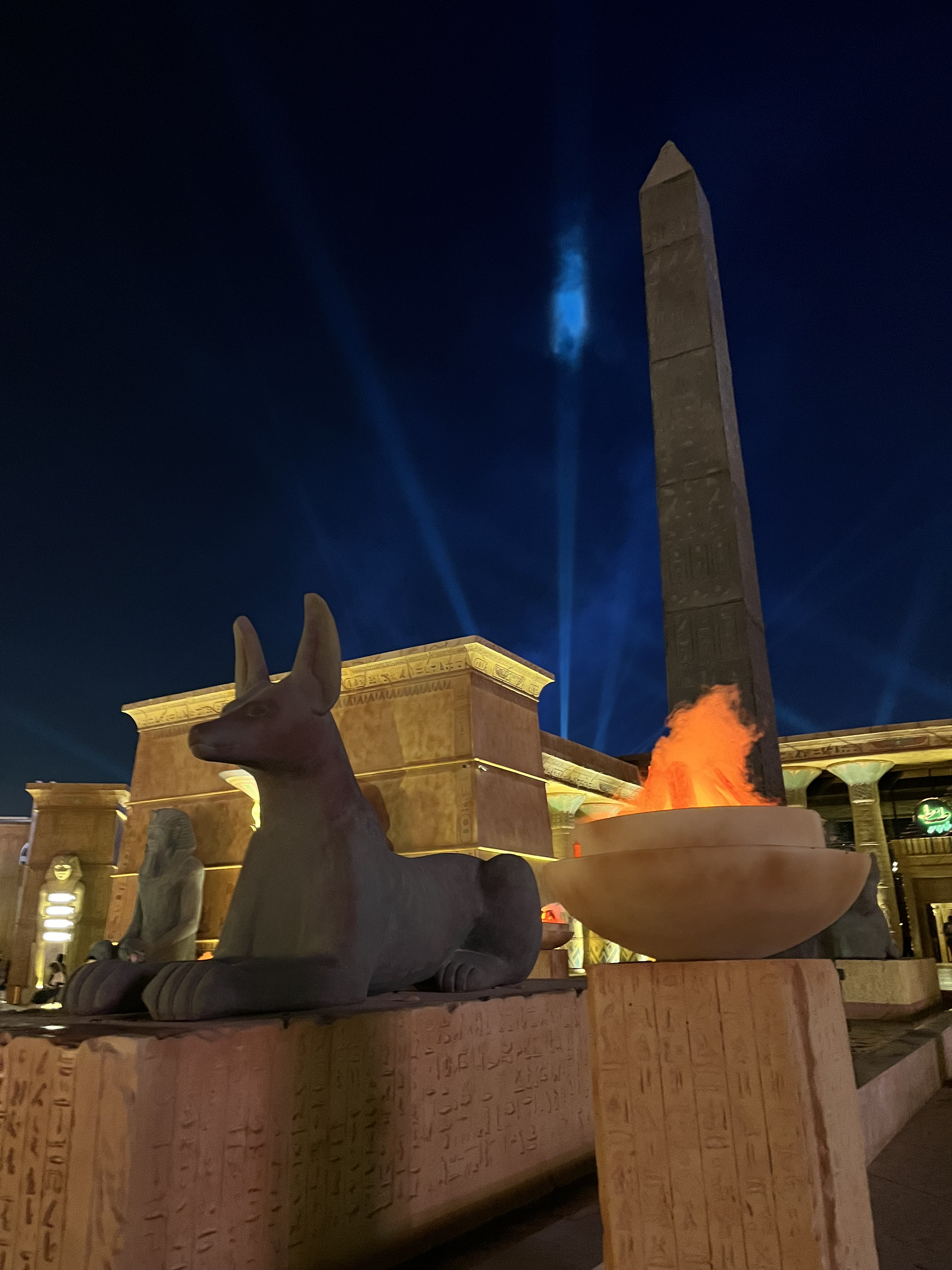
Luxor Obelisks

== See also ==
- List of tourist attractions in Riyadh
- Kingdom Arena
