= Riyadh XI =

Association football team in Saudi Arabia

- Full name: Riyadh All-Star XI
- Nicknames: List: Riyadh Season Team; Riyadh All-Stars; Riyadh ST XI
- Founded: 13 January 2023; 3 years ago.
- Ground: King Fahd Sports City
- Capacity: 58,398
- Owners: General Entertainment Authority; National Events Center
- League: Riyadh Season
- Website: riyadhseason.com

Riyadh All-Star XI is a professional football team based in Riyadh, Saudi Arabia. The team is founded in 2023 for the Riyadh Season, which consists of entertainment, cultural, and sporting events held in the Saudi Arabian capital of Riyadh. The team consists of players from the Riyadh teams, Al-Hilal and Al-Nassr.

== History ==
Riyadh XI was established on 2023 for the Riyadh Season. The team consists of players from Saudi Premier League teams Al-Hilal and Al-Nassr. The Riyadh Season Cup 2023 was organised between the Riyadh XI and Paris Saint-Germain. The match saw Cristiano Ronaldo playing his first game in Saudi Arabia following his transfer to Al-Nassr. Ronaldo scored twice in a 5–4 loss to Riyadh XI. The match witnessed many well-known players such as Kylian Mbappé, Neymar, Sergio Ramos and also the Messi–Ronaldo rivalry.

== Fixtures ==
=== 2023 ===
Amichevole
19 January 2023
20:00 SAST (UTC+3)
Amichevole

Riyadh XI (Saudi Arabia)	4–5	(France) Paris Saint-Germain
Ronaldo 34' (pen.), 45+6'; Jang Hyun-soo 56'; Talisca 90+4'	Report	Messi 3'; Marquinhos 43'; Ramos 53'; Mbappé 60' (pen.); Ekitike 78'

King Fahd Sports City, Riyadh, Saudi Arabia
Attendance: 68,000
Referee: Abdulrahman Al-Jassim (Qatar)

== Squad history ==
2023 Riyadh All-Star XI
No.	Pos.	Nat.	Player	Club
—N/a	MNG	ARG	Marcelo Gallardo	—N/a
1	GK	KSA	Amin Bukhari	Al-Nassr
21	GK	KSA	Mohammed Al-Owais	Al-Hilal
2	DF	KSA	Sultan Al-Ghannam	Al-Nassr
3	DF	KSA	Abdullah Madu	Al-Nassr
4	DF	KSA	Abdulelah Al-Amri	Al-Nassr
5	DF	KSA	Ali Al-Bulaihi	Al-Hilal
16	DF	KSA	Khalifah Al-Dawsari	Al-Hilal
20	DF	KOR	Jang Hyun-soo	Al-Hilal
66	DF	KSA	Saud Abdulhamid	Al-Hilal
78	DF	KSA	Ali Lajami	Al-Nassr
8	MF	KSA	Abdullah Otayf	Al-Hilal
10	MF	ARG	Pity Martínez	Al-Nassr
14	MF	KSA	Sami Al-Najei	Al-Nassr
15	MF	BRA	Matheus Pereira	Al-Hilal
17	MF	KSA	Abdullah Al-Khaibari	Al-Nassr
18	MF	BRA	Luiz Gustavo	Al-Nassr
19	MF	PER	André Carrillo	Al-Hilal
28	MF	KSA	Mohamed Kanno	Al-Hilal
7	FW	POR	Cristiano Ronaldo	Al-Nassr
11	FW	MLI	Moussa Marega	Al-Hilal
29	FW	KSA	Salem Al-Dawsari	Al-Hilal
94	FW	BRA	Talisca	Al-Nassr

== Honours ==
- Riyadh Season Cup runner-up: 2023
