= Al Murabaa (Riyadh Season zone) =

One of Riyadh Season's annual zones

Al Murabaa المربع
- Locations: National Museum Park, King Abdulaziz Historical Center, Al Murabba, Riyadh 12631, Saudi Arabia
- Coordinates: 24°38′41″N 46°42′36″E
- Established: 11 October 2019; 7 years ago
- Organizer: General Entertainment Authority; National Events Center
- Season: Riyadh Season

Al-Murabaa (Arabic: المربع, lit. 'The Square') is one of the annual zones of the Riyadh Season entertainment festival held at the National Museum Park of King Abdulaziz Historical Center in the al-Murabba neighborhood of Riyadh, Saudi Arabia. Inaugurated in October 2019 during the first edition of Riyadh Season, it features several seasonal restaurants and cafes with international cuisines that offer culinary traditions from countries like America, Italy, Greece, Japan, Argentina and France.
