= VIA Riyadh =

- ڤيا رياض

- VIA Riyadh, 2024
- Location: Al-Hada, Riyadh, Saudi Arabia
- Coordinates: 24°40′3.2592″N 46°37′36.8904″E
- Opened: 11 May 2023; 3 years ago
- Developer: Takamul Project Management Company
- Owner: Sela
- Website: www.viariyadh.com

VIA Riyadh (Arabic: ڤيا رياض) is a mixed-use development with high-end retail, hospitality and entertainment outlets in the al-Hada district of Riyadh, Saudi Arabia, located next to the Ritz-Carlton Hotel. Built using stones extracted from the Tuwaiq mountains, it was soft-opened in 2021 as one of the zones of Riyadh Season before being officially inaugurated in 2023. It is owned by Sela and contains the city's first St. Regis Hotel, which was completed in 2022.

== Overview ==
=== Timeline and development ===
In October 2021, Turki Al-Sheikh, chairman of the General Entertainment Authority of Saudi Arabia announced the unveiling of VIA Riyadh as one of the 14 zones of the 2021 edition of Riyadh Season through his official Twitter handle. The construction of VIA Riyadh was in line with the Saudi Vision 2030, a comprehensive plan to diversify Saudi Arabia's economy in the non-oil sector.

The overall project was overseen by the Takamul Project Management Company whereas its interior designing was contracted to SUD Architects, a French architecture company. In December 2021, Marriott International signed an agreement with Saudi Arabia's Sela Company to build a St. Regis Hotel in Riyadh and an EDITION hotel in Jeddah by 2022.

The General Entertainment Authority in a press release in October 2022 announced that VIA Riyadh was set to inaugurate as a "permanent zone" during the 2022 edition of Riyadh Season, similar to the Boulevard Riyadh City.

In late January 2023, General Entertainment Authority chairman Turki Al-Sheikh conducted a private inauguration ceremony of VIA Riyadh, which was attended by the country's Minister of Tourism Ahmed al-Kateeb, chairman of the board of directors of Saudi Journalists Association Khalid al-Malik and the Japanese ambassador to Saudi Arabia, Iwai Fumio.

A week before its official opening on 11 May 2023, the Riyadh Calendar released a promotional video for VIA Riyadh featuring American-Colombian actress Sofía Vergara. Days later, Argentine professional footballer Lionel Messi was spotted in VIA Riyadh along with his family who had arrived in the Saudi capital just hours after FC Lorient's historic win over Paris Saint-Germain.

== Design and reception ==
=== Architecture ===
Exterior of VIA Riyadh, 2024

The compound was built using stones extracted from the nearby Tuwaiq mountains on the six core principles of Salmani style, a distinct type of urban Najdi architectural method developed in Riyadh Province during the reign of Prince Salman bin Abdulaziz as the region's governor between 1963 and 2011.

=== Brand outlets and leisure ===
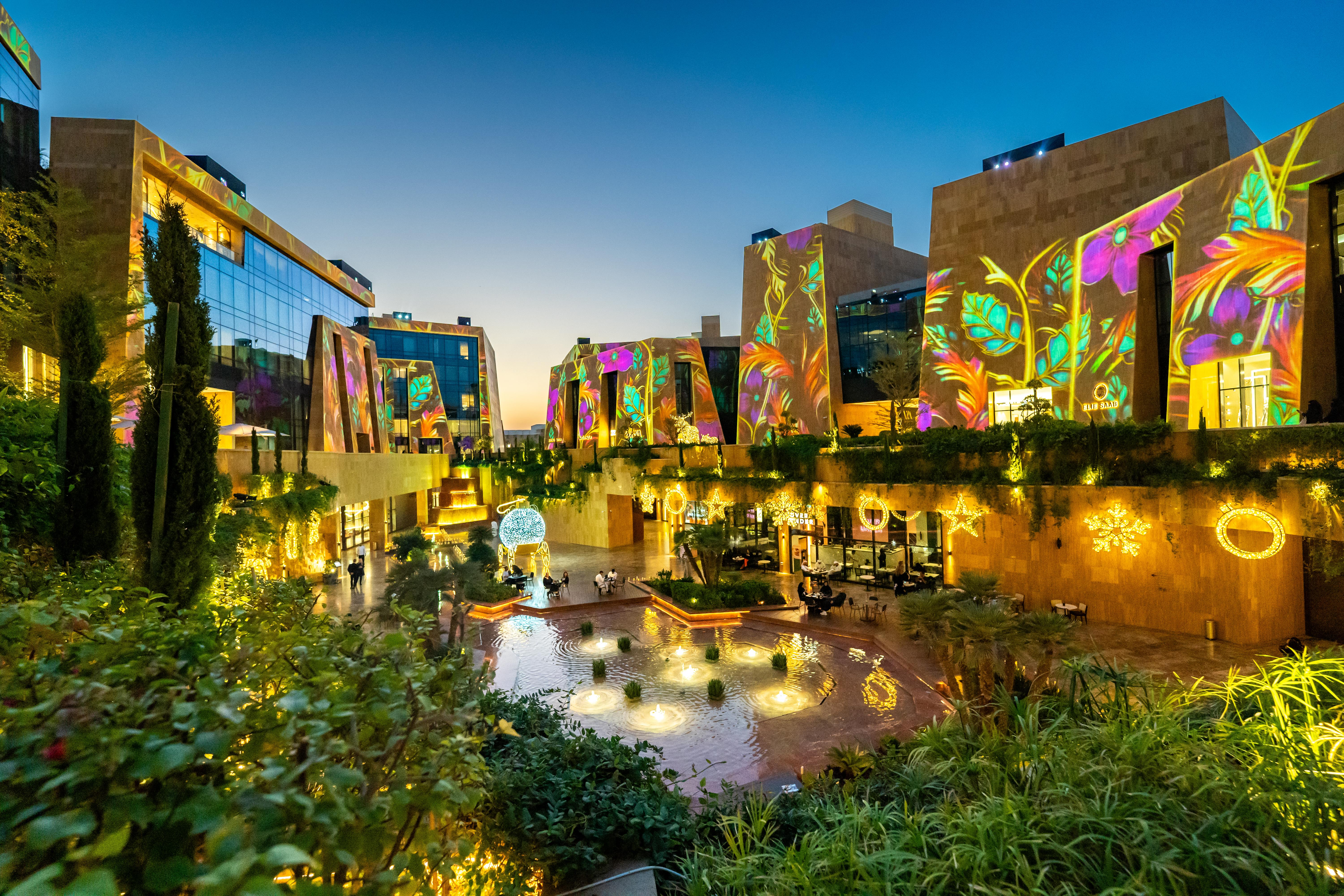
Via Riyadh, 2024.

The compound of VIA Riyadh hosts 25 shops, 17 restaurants and 7 cinemas of international and local brands, including UK'sdining outlets Gymkhana, Sexy Fish and Scott's as well as US-based Spago and Bianca. Retail outlets opened exclusively in the precincts consist those of American fashion designer Brandon Maxwell and Lebanese fashion designer Elie Saab besides art galleries that include Richard Orlinski, Artfeena, Phoenix Ancient Art and VIA Collection. Seven cinemas make up the entertainment sector of the compound, namely, Avant Garde, Interstellar, the Oasis, Orient Express, Secret Garden, Tuwaiq Hall and Wall Street.

==== Shopping ====
Retail outlets
Outlet	Type	Country of origin
Aesop	Beauty and skin-care	Australia
Aquazzura	Footwear	Italy
Artfeena	Art	Saudi Arabia
Ashi	Fashion	Saudi Arabia
Belluci Jewelry	Jewelry	Saudi Arabia
Brandon Maxwell	Fashion	United States
Chaps & Co	Salon	United Arab Emirates
Charles Oudin	Watches	France
Clé	Watches	Saudi Arabia
David Webb	Jewelry	United States
Dolce & Gabbana	Fashion and footwear	Italy
Elie Saab	Fashion	Lebanon
Fleurs De Vie	Flowers	United Kingdom
Indulge in Luxury	Fashion and jewelry	Australia
Isaia	Fashion	Italy
Brunello Cucinelli	Fashion	Italy
Maria Tash	Jewelry	United States
L'atelier Nawbar	Jewelry	Lebanon
Mwaz	Fashion	Saudi Arabia
Phoenix Ancient Art	Art	United StatesSwitzerland
Richard Orlinski	Art	France
Sergio Rossi	Footwear	Italy
VIA Collection by Seven	Automobile gallery	Saudi Arabia
Tom Ford	Fashion	United States
Zimmermann	Fashion	Australia
Jacques La Coupe	Salon	United Arab Emirates

==== Restaurants and cafeterias ====
Restaurant	Cuisine
Bianca	American
café ELLE	French and Saudi Arabian
Chi Spacca	Italian
Ferdi	Latin American
Gymkhana	Indian
Joan's on Third	American
Les Deux Magots	French
Madeo Ristorante	Italian
ManuH Cigar Lounge	Saudi Arabian
Over Under	British
Raoul's	French
Scott's	British
Sexy Fish	Japanese
Spago	American
WAGYUMAFIA	Japanese
YAKINIKUMAFIA	Japanese
Via Mercato	Mixed

==== Cinema ====
- Avant Garde
- Interstellar
- Oasis
- Orient Express
- Secret Garden
- Tuwaiq Hall
- Wall Street
