= Saudi Comic Con =

Saudi comic-fan gathering

Saudi Comic Con سعودي كوميك كون
- Status: Defunct
- Genre: Comic
- Venue: Take-off Center
- Locations: Jeddah, Saudi Arabia
- Country: Saudi Arabia
- Inaugurated: 2017; 9 years ago
- Attendance: 20,000 people
- Organizer: Time Entertainment
- Website: www.saudicomiccon.com

The Saudi Comic Con (SCC) (Arabic: سعودي كوميك كون) was the first comic book and pop culture convention held in Jeddah, Saudi Arabia. Organized by Time Entertainment and supported by the General Entertainment Authority (GEA), the inaugural event took place in Jeddah in February 2017. SCC marked a significant milestone in the Kingdom’s efforts to diversify its entertainment sector under Vision 2030.

== History ==
=== Inauguration (2017) ===
The first Saudi Comic Con was held from February 16 to 18, 2017, at the Take-Off Center in Jeddah. The event was organized by Time Entertainment, a Riyadh-based company led at the time by CEO Héctor Alegre, in collaboration with the General Entertainment Authority. The event attracted approximately 20,000 attendees over three days, featuring a range of activities including cosplay, gaming, and panel discussions.

A hashtag denoting it as a "devil-worshipping" festival became popular on Twitter, however, and there were calls for a boycott. Nonetheless the convention was popular, and included both national and international talent: Charles Dance and Julian Glover from Game of Thrones, Giancarlo Esposito from Breaking Bad, Mads Mikkelsen from Doctor Strange, and assorted Saudi producers and actors, including cast members from the upcoming Saudi superhero show Mas'hour (meaning "Bewitched" in Arabic) appeared on panels.

The event was noted both for being a recognition of the importance of anime and pop culture in Saudi Arabia, and for giving a platform to local artists and the national entertainment industry in the global economy.

=== Subsequent Events (2018) ===
Following the inaugural event, Saudi Comic Con returned in 2018, continuing to offer a mix of international and local pop culture content. The 2018 edition featured actor Ian Somerhalder, known for his role in The Vampire Diaries, who expressed enthusiasm about engaging with Saudi fans.

== Organization ==
Time Entertainment, a Riyadh-based company, organized Saudi Comic Con in collaboration with the General Entertainment Authority.

== Impact ==
TIME Entertainment CEO Obada Awad described Saudi Comic Con as “a phenomenon that changed the entertainment scene in the country,” noting the strong demand it received from fans across the GCC.

The General Entertainment Authority’s CEO, Amr Al-Madani, stated that the “overwhelming number of people and families who attended, and the memorable moments captured online, show the potential of bringing popular occasions such as these to our country,” highlighting the alignment of such events with the Kingdom’s Vision 2030 goals.

The event hosted 95 exhibitor booths and 60 artist tables, providing local and regional comic artists a platform to showcase their work, including Arabic manga and original content. International exhibitors also praised the event’s organization and audience engagement. Sergio Azzi, a representative of the “No Lands” booth and veteran of Comic Cons in London, Madrid, and Rome, called it “simply amazing” and noted that “the crowd was really, really awesome… we didn’t expect it to be so good.”

Azzi also commented on the high number of English-speaking Saudi attendees and the unexpected talent among local artists, saying he and his team looked forward to working with Saudi creators and hoped to see more Arabic comics and animations in future editions.

== See also ==
- General Entertainment Authority
- Saudi Vision 2030
- Riyadh Season
