= Riyadh Winter Wonderland =

Annual carnival held during the Riyadh Season in Saudi Arabia

Riyadh Winter Wonderland الرياض ونتر وندرلاند
- Status: Active
- Frequency: Annually
- Venue: King Abdullah Financial District
- Locations: Riyadh, Saudi Arabia
- Country: Saudi Arabia
- Inaugurated: 20 October 2019
- Founder: Mellors Entertainment LLC
- Area: 93 acres
- Organiser: General Entertainment Authority; Mellors Group

Riyadh Winter Wonderland (Arabic: الرياض ونتر وندرلاند, romanized: Arriyāḍ Wintar Wandar Lānd), simply at times Winter Wonderland, is an annual carnival held during the Riyadh Season entertainment festival in a 93-acres theme park located in King Abdullah Financial District of Riyadh, Saudi Arabia. It was inaugurated in October 2019 during the first edition of Riyadh Season.

== History ==
Riyadh Winter Wonderland was initially inaugurated as a 50-acres theme park on October 20, 2019 during the first week of the 2019 edition of Riyadh Season as one of the zones of the entertainment festival. The theme park offered 42 games, including the largest skating rink in the Middle East, theatrical performances, Real Madrid club exhibition, and illusionist acts. Originally scheduled till 15 December 2019, however, Crown Prince Mohammed bin Salman issued directives in November 2019 for the extension of Riyadh Season till the end of January 2020 in selected zones that were attracting more visitors, including Winter Wonderland.

During the 2021 edition of Riyadh Season, the Winter Wonderland was relaunched by the General Entertainment Authority on 26 October 2021. The area of theme park saw an increase of almost 40% compared to the 2019 edition of Riyadh Season and offered much more recreational choices.
