= Kingdom Arena =

Football stadium in Riyadh, Saudi Arabia

Coordinates: 24°46′43″N 46°36′21″E

- المملكة أرينا al-Mamlakah 'Arina
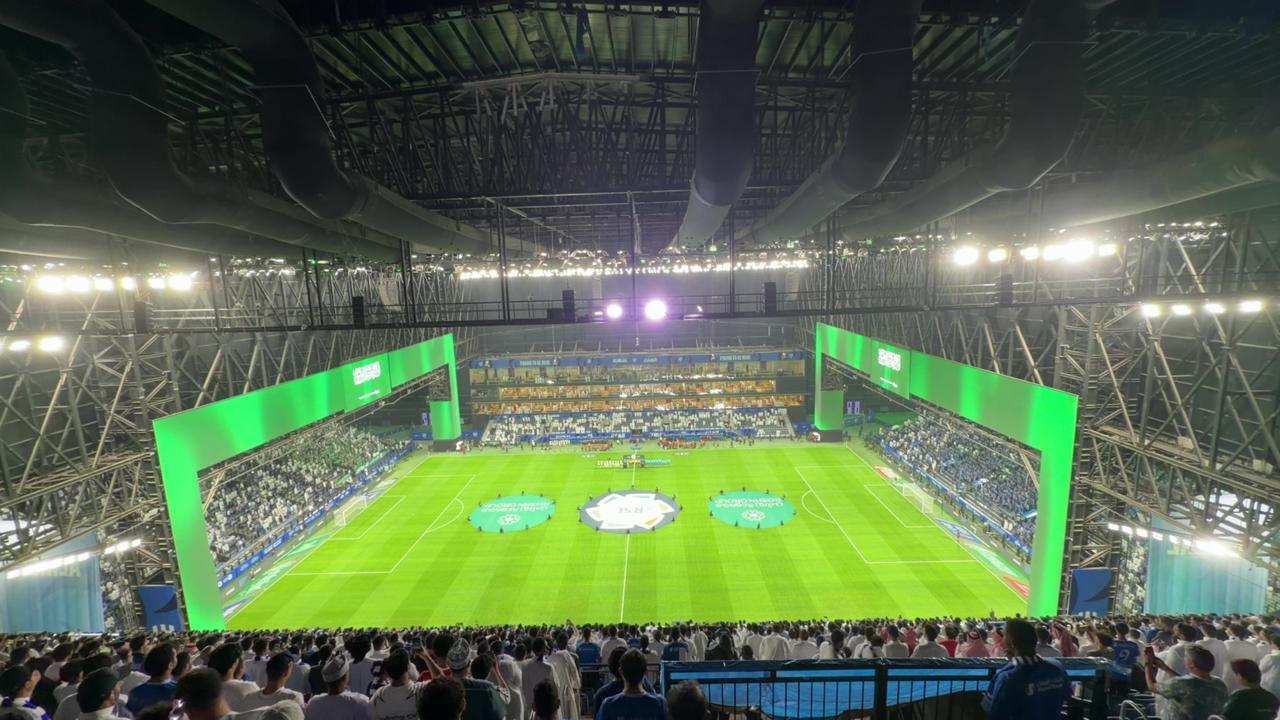

- Interactive map of Kingdom Arena
- Former names: Boulevard Hall (2023)
- Location: Riyadh, Saudi Arabia
- Owner: General Entertainment Authority
- Operator: General Entertainment Authority (Al-Hilal Company, only for its football matches)
- Capacity: 30,000
- Surface: Grass

Construction
- Groundbreaking: July 18, 2023; 3 years ago
- Opened: October 28, 2023; 3 years ago
- Architect: Ali Al-Yami

Tenants
- Al-Hilal (2023–present): Major sporting events hosted; 2025 & 2026 WWE Night of Champions 2027 AFC Asian Cup (planned)

Website
- Kingdom Arena

Kingdom Arena is a multi-purpose stadium located in the Hittin neighborhood of Riyadh, Saudi Arabia. The stadium has a seating capacity of approximately 30,000 and is designed to host a wide range of events, including football matches, music concerts, professional boxing bouts, and professional wrestling. It features a retractable roof and is fully air-conditioned.

== History ==
The stadium was built in 180 days and accommodates 26,090 spectators, including 20 luxury boxes. It has a retractable roof and a four-sided video screen suspended over the center. In September 2023, the Kingdom Holding Company obtained the management rights to operate the stadium as the home of Al-Hilal. As part of the agreement, it also received the naming rights to the stadium.

The first football match to be played at the stadium was a friendly match on 29 January 2024 (corresponding to the 2024 Riyadh Season Cup) between Al-Hilal and Inter Miami, which ended in Al Hilal winning 4–3.

On 8 February 2024, the stadium received two Guinness World Records for the largest covered football stadium and the highest capacity for an indoor covered stadium.

== Events ==
=== Boxing ===
- Tyson Fury vs. Francis Ngannou
- Anthony Joshua vs. Otto Wallin
- Anthony Joshua vs. Francis Ngannou
- Tyson Fury vs. Oleksandr Usyk
- Queensberry vs. Matchroom 5v5
- Artur Beterbiev vs. Dmitry Bivol
- Oleksandr Usyk vs. Tyson Fury II
- Artur Beterbiev vs. Dmitry Bivol II

=== Mixed martial arts ===
- PFL vs Bellator: Ferreira vs. Bader
- UFC on ABC: Whittaker vs. Aliskerov

=== Professional wrestling ===
WWE

- Night of Champions (2025)
- SmackDown (2025)
- Night of Champions (2026)

=== Association football ===
Riyadh Season Cup 2024

- Al-Hilal vs. Inter Miami
- Al-Nassr vs. Inter Miami
- Al-Hilal vs. Al-Nassr

CAF Super Cup: 2024 Final

- Al-Ahly vs. Zamalek

=== Saudi Women's Cup ===
Saudi Women's Cup: Final 2023–24

- Al-Ahli vs. Al-Shabab

Saudi Women's Cup: Final 2024–25

- Al-Ahli vs. Al-Qadsiah

== See also ==
- List of football stadiums in Saudi Arabia
- Riyadh Season
- Boulevard World
- Boulevard City
