= Riyadh Season =

Annual series of entertainment events in Riyadh, Saudi Arabia

Riyadh Season موسم الرياض

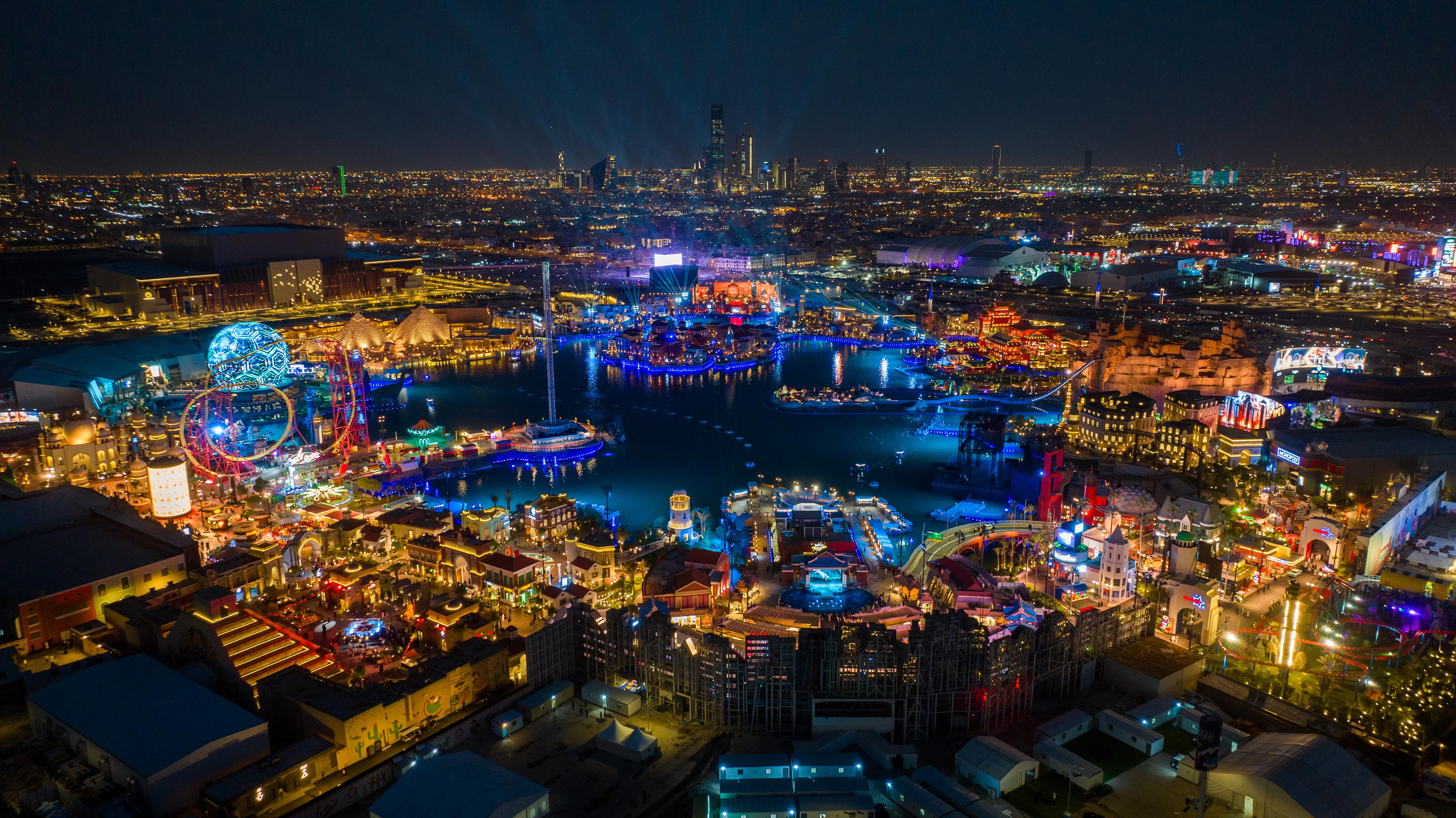
- Boulevard World
- Begins: October
- Ends: March
- Location: Riyadh
- Country: Saudi Arabia
- Founded: October 11, 2019
- Major events: Entertainment • Sports
- Organizer: General Entertainment Authority; National Events Center
- Sponsors: SNB Bank; STC Group; Saudia
- Part of: Saudi Seasons
- Website: riyadhseason.com

Riyadh Season (Arabic: موسم الرياض) is an annual series of entertainment, cultural, and sporting events held in Riyadh, the capital of Saudi Arabia. The season is organized by the General Entertainment Authority as part of the Saudi Seasons initiative supporting Saudi Vision 2030.

Riyadh Season has long been criticized as being part of the country's sportswashing campaign designed to divert attention from the country's poor human rights record, particularly following the assassination of Jamal Khashoggi.

In 2025, academic Christopher Davidson argued: "They don’t have to cultivate a brand of being progressive or human rights-friendly, because they don’t care about that. Dubai has already perfectly demonstrated to the world that that does not matter. People will come if it’s a flashy, interesting destination."

== History ==
Riyadh Season was introduced in 2019 as part of an initiative by the General Entertainment Authority (GEA) known as Saudi Seasons, a portfolio of 11 regional cultural festivals that aim to promote tourism in Saudi Arabia in support of Saudi Vision 2030.

The inaugural edition of Riyadh Season resulted in a sizable increase in tourism during the period; the GEA estimated that the events collectively generated six billion riyals in revenue, there were at least 11 million visitors to the city during the 66-day period, a 106% increase in flight bookings to the city, and a 240% increase in bookings to one, two, and three-star hotels.

Riyadh Season was not held in 2020–21 due to the COVID-19 pandemic. It returned for 2021–22, extended through March 2022. With COVID-19 restrictions eased, its opening ceremony (which featured a performance by American rapper Pitbull) was attended by 750,000 people in the boulevard district.

The 2022 opening ceremony set a record for the largest number of drones simultaneously launching fireworks. At least five million visitors attended events in the first two months of the period.

In October 2024, sports streaming service DAZN reached an agreement with the GEA making it the exclusive broadcaster of all Riyadh Season-sponsored events, including international distribution rights to all of its boxing cards outside of the Middle East and North Africa (MENA) region.

== Structure ==
Riyadh Season is typically scheduled from October through March.

It involves seasonal events and experiences dispersed "zones" such as the Boulevard City, Boulevard World, Roshn Front, Al Malazz, and National Museum Park districts.

Major events such as concerts, music festivals, and sporting events (particularly football, boxing and mixed martial arts events) are promoted under the banner held at venues such as Mohammed Abdo Arena and Kingdom Arena.

Several tourist attractions of the city are selected and designated as entertainment zones.

== Attendance ==
Riyadh Season visitor statistics
Season	Year	Total visitors (approx.)	Trend	Ref.
1st Edition	2019–2020	10,300,000	—	
2nd Edition	2021–2022	15,000,000	green	
3rd Edition	2022–2023	15,000,000	Steady	
4th Edition	2023–2024	20,000,000	green	
5th Edition	2024–2025	19,000,000	red	
6th Edition	2025–2026	14,000,000*	(Ongoing)	

*Mid-season milestone figure.

== Riyadh Season 2019–2020 ==
The first edition of the festival was launched on October 11, 2019 and was set to end on December 11, but it was extended to January 2020 after the number of visitors exceeded 10 million.

On October 17, 2019, the opening parade of the first edition of Riyadh Season was held in Riyadh Boulevard zone with an attendance of more than 600,000 visitors.

It included 100 events that took place at 12 different zones, and was hosted under seven themes and experiences: Joy, inspire, taste, explore, fantasy, speed and desert.

The Taste theme originated in accordance with opening 31 restaurant from different cuisines all across the following zones:

1. Riyadh Boulevard
2. Riyadh Front
3. Riyadh Car Exhibition
4. Riyadh Winter Wonderland
5. Riyadh Sports Arenas
6. Diplomatic Quarters
7. Al-Murabaa
8. Al-Malazz
9. Wadi Namar
10. Riyadh Beat
11. Riyadh Safari
12. Riyadh Sahara

== Riyadh Season 2021–2022 ==
The second edition of Riyadh Season was launched on October 20, 2021 and lasted until the end of March 2022.

It lies in an area measuring 5.4 million square meters in which it hosts more than 7,000 events at 14 different zones.

1. Riyadh Boulevard
2. VIA Riyadh
3. Combat Field
4. Riyadh Winter Wonderland
5. Riyadh Front
6. Al-Murabaa
7. Riyadh Safari
8. Al-Athriyah
9. Riyadh Oasis
10. The Groves
11. Nabd al-Riyadh
12. Zaman Village
13. al-Salam Tree
14. Khalooha

== Riyadh Season 2022–2023 ==
The third edition of Riyadh Season was launched on October 21, 2022 and lasted until March 2023.

This included 8,500 activity days. This season had a principal of 15 zones in the Riyadh Boulevard and represented many cultures such as:

1. America
2. France
3. Greece
4. Italy
5. India
6. China
7. Spain
8. Morocco
9. Mexico
10. Qassim
11. Hail

The 2022 Riyadh Season also included 2023 Riyadh Season Cup, a friendly football match between Paris Saint-Germain (PSG) and Riyadh XI (combined Al Hilal and Al Nassr all-star team) held at King Fahd International Stadium on 19 January 2023.

The game received global attention as the game pitted Lionel Messi and Cristiano Ronaldo, two of the greatest football players in the world and the subject of intense debate, directly against each other for the first time since 2020, as Messi played for PSG and Ronaldo joined Al Nassr days prior to the friendly.

PSG won the match 5–4.

== Riyadh Season 2023–2024 ==
The fourth edition of Riyadh Season launched on October 28, 2023 with new identity and tagline ("Big Time").

The opener event, Battle of Baddest, featuring Tyson Fury and Francis Ngannou, was held at Boulevard Hall on the same day.

This year's Riyadh Season was marked with the addition of Boulevard Hall (named Kingdom Arena for sponsorship reasons), an indoor arena with a FIFA and AFC-approved football pitch. It was fully opened in January 2024 and serves as the new home ground of Al Hilal.

The following events took place as part of 2023 Riyadh Season:

- On 28 October 2023, the Tyson Fury vs. Francis Ngannou heavyweight boxing fight was held in Kingdom Arena (Boulevard Hall) to kick off the Riyadh Season.
- On 4 November 2023, WWE Crown Jewel 2023 was held in Mohammed Abdu Arena.
- On 17 November 2023, If Y'all Weren't Here, I'd Be Crying Tour by American rapper Post Malone was held in Kingdom Arena (Boulevard Hall).
- Soundstorm Festival by MDLBEAST was held between 14–16 December 2023.
- On 23 December 2023, a boxing event billed as the Day of Reckoning, headlined by Anthony Joshua vs. Otto Wallin and co-main event Deontay Wilder vs. Joseph Parker, was held at the Kingdom Arena (Boulevard Hall).
- On 26–27 December 2023, the Riyadh Season Tennis Cup, featuring Novak Djokovic, Carlos Alcaraz, Ons Jabeur and Aryna Sabalenka, was held at the Kingdom Arena (Boulevard Hall).
- On 10–14 January 2024, the 2023–24 Supercopa de España featuring Real Madrid, Barcelona, Atlético Madrid and Osasuna, was held at the Al-Awwal Park (King Saud University Stadium).
- On 21–25 January 2024, the 2023 Supercoppa Italiana featuring Napoli, Inter Milan, Lazio and Fiorentina, was held at the Al-Awwal Park (King Saud University Stadium).
- The 2024 Riyadh Season Cup football tournament featuring Al Hilal, Al Nassr and Inter Miami, in a single-round robin group, where the table toppers were crowned champions. The matches between Al Hilal and Inter Miami, Al Nassr vs Inter Miami and Al Hilal vs Al Nassr was held on 29 January, 1 February and 8 February 2024 respectively at the Kingdom Arena (Boulevard Hall). All three of these clubs signed well-known world-class players in 2023, with Paris Saint-Germain players Lionel Messi and Neymar transferring to Inter Miami and Al Hilal, respectively, while Cristiano Ronaldo transferred from Manchester United to Al Nassr. Due to Messi and Ronaldo both being 36 and 38 years old respectively, it is likely the last time the two will play against each other in a match, leading many to dub it "The Last Dance".
- On 24 February 2024, the mixed martial arts event PFL vs. Bellator: Champs was held outside the Kingdom Arena (Boulevard Hall).
- On 4–6 March 2024, the first professional Snooker tournament was held in Boulevard City. Ronnie O'Sullivan won the World Masters of Snooker title.
- On 8 March 2024, the Anthony Joshua vs. Francis Ngannou boxing match was held at the Kingdom Arena (Boulevard Hall).
- On 18 May 2024, the Tyson Fury vs. Oleksandr Usyk boxing match was held at the Kingdom Arena (Boulevard Hall). It was originally scheduled to be held in February 2024, but was postponed after Fury was injured in training.

=== Zones ===
There are 12 Zones in Riyadh Season 2023:

- Boulevard World
- Boulevard City
- Kingdom Arena (Boulevard Hall)
- Ramla Terraza
- VIA Riyadh
- Wonder Garden
- Food Truck Park
- Riyadh Zoo
- Roshn Front
- The Groves
- Souq Al Awaleen
- Suwaidi Park

== Riyadh Season 2024–2025 ==
The fifth edition of Riyadh Season launched on October 12.

The following events took place as part of 2024 Riyadh Season:

- On September 27, 2024 (15 days before the official start of the season), the 2024 CAF Super Cup between Al Ahly (champions of the 2023-24 CAF Champions League) and Zamalek (winners of the 2023-24 CAF Confederations Cup), was held at the Kingdom Arena (Boulevard Hall).
- Artur Beterbiev vs. Dmitry Bivol was held at the Kingdom Arena (Boulevard Hall) on October 12, 2024.
- 2024 Six Kings Slam was held at the anb Arena from October 16–19, 2024. A tennis tournament featuring Novak Djokovic, Carlos Alcaraz, Rafael Nadal, Daniil Medvedev, Jannik Sinner and Holger Rune.
- PFL Super Fights: Battle of the Giants headlined by Francis Ngannou vs Renan Ferreira was held at the Mayadeen on October 19, 2024.
- WWE Crown Jewel was held at the Mohammed Abdo Arena on November 2, 2024.
- Gilberto Ramirez vs Chris Billam-Smith was held at the anb Arena on November 16, 2024.
- PFL 10: Loughnane vs Khizriev the finale of the playoffs for all 2024 divisions was held at Al-Awwal Park (King Saudi University Stadium) on November 29, 2024.
- Riyadh Season Snooker Championship was held at the Global Theatre from 18 to 20 December 2024.
- Oleksandr Usyk vs. Tyson Fury II was held at the Kingdom Arena (Boulevard Hall) on December 21, 2024.
- The 2024 Supercoppa Italiana featuring Inter Milan, AC Milan, Juventus and Atalanta was held at Al-Awwal Park (King Saud University Stadium) from January 2–6, 2025.
- UFC Fight Night: Adesanya vs. Imavov was held at the ANB Arena on February 1, 2025. Power Slap 11 was held at the same arena on January 30, 2025.
- Artur Beterbiev vs Dmitry Bivol II was held at the ANB Arena on February 22, 2025.
- Canelo Álvarez vs William Scull was held at the ANB Arena on May 4, 2025.
- The WBC Boxing Grand Prix tournament organised by the World Boxing Council in collaboration with Riyadh Season, which features elimination rounds across multiple weight-classes throughout the season in five phases from April 17 to December 20, 2025.

== Riyadh Season 2025–2026 ==
The sixth edition of Riyadh Season launched in October.

The following events took place as part of 2025 Riyadh Season and one event was relocated:

- 2025 Six Kings Slam was held at the ANB Arena from October 15–18, 2025.
- Riyadh Season Snooker Championship was held at the Global Theatre from 19 to 21 November 2025.
- David Benavidez vs Anthony Yarde was held at the ANB Arena on November 22, 2025. It was marketed as Night of the Champions.
- The 2025–26 Supercoppa Italiana featuring Napoli, Bologna, Inter Milan and AC Milan was held at Al-Awwal Park (King Saud University Stadium) from December 18–22, 2025.
- Naoya Inoue vs David Picasso was held at the Mohammed Abdo Arena on December 27, 2025. It wasmarketed as Night of the Samurai.
- The inaugural Saudi Arabia Darts Masters was held at the Global Theatre from January 19 to 20, 2026.
- WWE: Royal Rumble was held at the Riyadh Season Stadium in the KAFD on January 31, 2026.
- Fanatics Flag Football Classic was originally set to be held in Riyadh on March 21, 2026, featuring current and former National Football League (NFL) players, most notably Tom Brady. However, due to the 2026 Iran war affecting Saudi Arabia, the event was relocated to BMO Stadium in Los Angeles.

== Riyadh Season 2026–2027 ==
The seventh edition of Riyadh Season will launch in October.

The following events will take place as part of 2026 Riyadh Season:

- Canelo Álvarez vs Christian Mbilli was held at the ANB Arena on October 31, 2026.
- WWE: Crown Jewel was held at the ANB Arena on November 7, 2026.
- Zuffa Boxing: Adames vs. Warburton was held at the ANB Arena on November 14, 2026.
- UFC Fight Night: Adesanya vs. Magomedov will be held at the ANB Arena on December 5, 2026.
- 2026 Six Kings Slam will be held at the ANB Arena from December 27-30, 2026.
- WWE: WrestleMania 43 will be held in Riyadh in 2027.

== Gallery ==
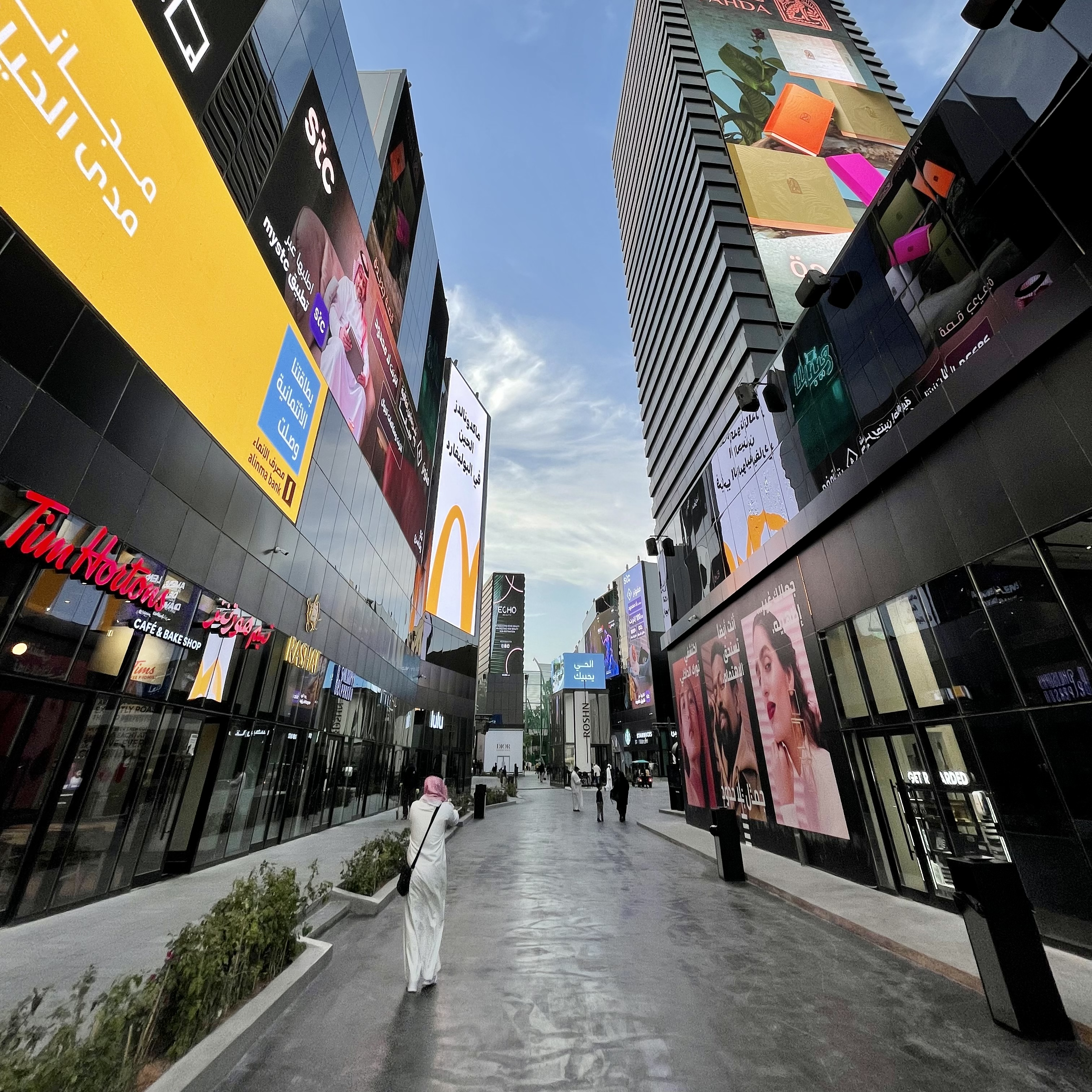
Boulevard City

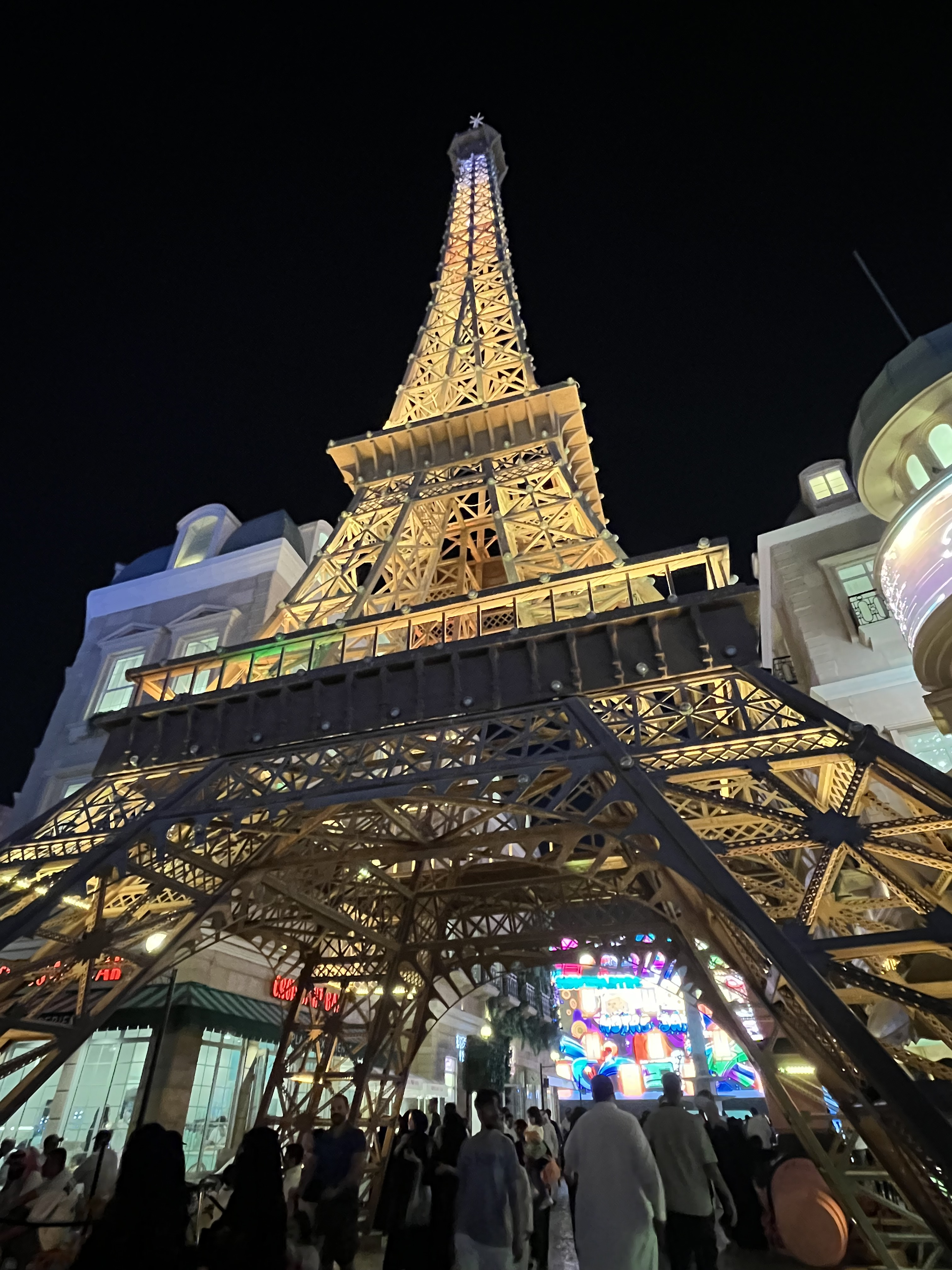
Boulevard World

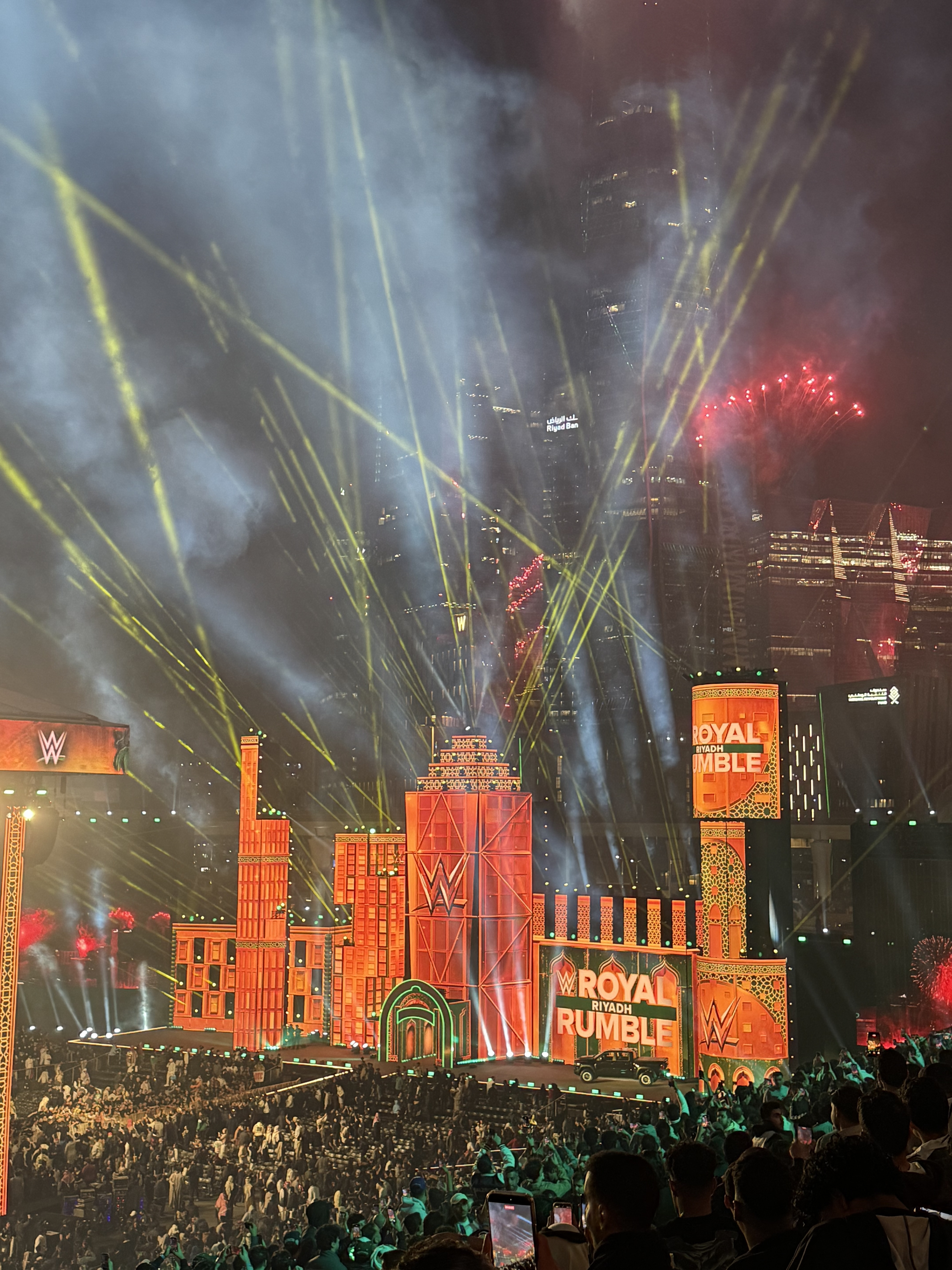
WWE Royal Rumble (2026)

== See also ==
- Tourism in Saudi Arabia
