= National Events Center =

Saudi Arabia's government department that oversees the country's public events

National Events Center (NEC)
- المركز الوطني للفعاليات

Agency overview
- Formed: March 10, 2020; 6 years ago
- Jurisdiction: Government of Saudi Arabia
- Headquarters: Dis, 2677 Alqeeq, Riyadh 13519 Saudi Arabia
- Parent department: Council of Economic and Development Affairs
- Website: nec.gov.sa

National Events Center (NEC) (Arabic: المركز الوطني للفعاليات) is a government department in Saudi Arabia that is responsible for overseeing state-sponsored events and festivals (like Saudi Seasons) across the country in cooperation with relevant agencies. Established through a royal decree by King Salman against the backdrop of the COVID-19 pandemic in March 2020, it is affiliated with the Council of Economic and Development Affairs, one of the two subcabinets of Saudi Arabia.

== History ==
The National Events Center was established through a royal decree issued by King Salman on March 10, 2020, against the backdrop of the COVID-19 pandemic in Saudi Arabia. In October 2021, the department launched the "Matloob" platform during the Riyadh Season which aimed to facilitate and organize the participation of individuals and companies in the events and seasons of Saudi Arabia.

== Partner agencies ==
The National Events Center manages and oversees state-sponsored events in Saudi Arabia through relevant agencies, which include

- General Entertainment Authority
- Ministry of Culture
- Ministry of Sport
- Ministry of Tourism
- Saudi Conventions and Exhibitions General Authority
