= Turki Al-Sheikh =

Saudi minister (born 1981)

- تركي آل الشيخ
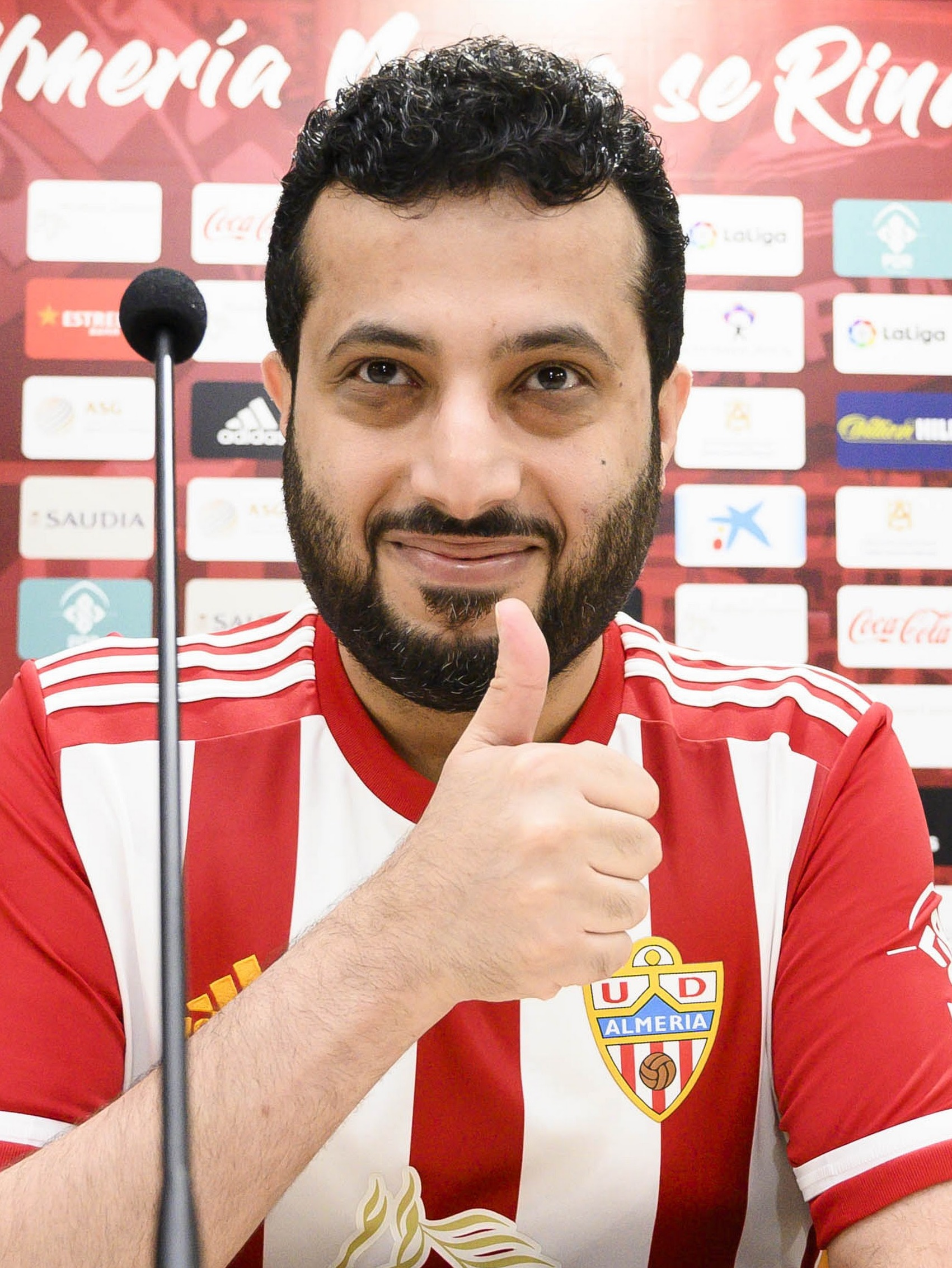
- Al-Sheikh in 2019
- Born: Turki bin Abdul Mohsen Al-Sheikh; August 4, 1981 (age 45); Saudi Arabia
- Other names: Turki Alalshikh; Tutu
- Education: King Fahd Security College
- Occupations: Chairman of General Entertainment Authority; Adviser at the Royal Court
- Website: https://turkialalshikh.net

Turki bin Abdul Mohsen Al-Sheikh (Arabic: تركي بن عبد المحسن بن عبد اللطيف آل الشيخ; born August 4, 1981), also known as Turki Alalshikh, is a Saudi government official. He is chairman of the General Entertainment Authority (GEA), a Saudi government department, and an adviser at the Royal Court under the rank of Minister. He is a co-founder of Zuffa Boxing, was the owner of Egyptian football club Pyramids from 2018 to 2019, and the owner of Spanish club Almería from 2019 to 2025.

Alalshikh has been described as a "key on-the-ground operator" in Saudi ruler Mohammed bin Salman's rise to power, helping him purge competing Saudi political elites. He has detained people for posting critiques of him on social media; those detained are reportedly in an area of al-Ha'ir prison which detainees call the "Tutu Wing", referencing a nickname of Alalshikh. Those living in Saudi Arabia who criticise government officials, such as Alalshikh, are eligible to be executed.

Alalshikh's actions for the Saudi government are seen by human rights groups as part of a broader effort to launder the Saudi government's reputation. According to Human Rights Watch, these activities are intended "to deflect attention from its brutal repression of free speech and other pervasive human rights violations."

== Early life ==
Alalshikh was born in Riyadh in August 1981. His mother was a school principal while his father was a civil servant at the Ministry of Youth. He is a part of the Al ash-Sheikh family, which is second in prestige in Saudi Arabia after the ruling Saud dynasty.

He graduated from King Fahd Security College in 2001 with a bachelor's degree in security sciences.

== Career ==
He was given a job in the state security department after graduating. He was later appointed to office of Salman, governor of Riyadh, who had later unexpectedly become King of Saudi Arabia. While working for Salman, he grew close to his son and future ruler Mohammed bin Salman, who was of a similar age. The two bonded over video games, such as League of Legends and Assassin’s Creed.

He was appointed an adviser to the royal court in 2015 and later, in 2017, he was promoted to be a royal advisor with the rank of minister.

In September 2017, Alalshikh was appointed as the new chairman of the General Sports Authority. In December 2018, he was appointed as chairman of the General Entertainment Authority. Alalshikh is chairman of the Islamic Solidarity Sports Association (ISSF), and previously Honorary President of Al-Taawoun in Buraidah.

=== Film industry ===
During Alalshikh's tenure as chairman of the GEA, Saudi Arabia lifted a 35-year-old ban on cinemas. Under Al-Sheikh, the GEA organised the Joy Forum19, an event attended by Jackie Chan, Jean-Claude Van Damme, Jason Momoa, and Shah Rukh Khan. Alalshikh commented, "Today you are witnessing things we have never had in Saudi Arabia. We have 300,000 visitors to our events".

Alalshikh scripted The Cello, which was regarded as the first Arabic international horror film. Directed by Darren Bousman, it starred Jeremy Irons and Tobin Bell, as well as Elham Ali and Samer Ismail. The budget for The Cello was $17m, though it only grossed $5,310 in cinemas.

In February 2024, Alalshikh launched a new investment fund geared towards upgrading Arabic cinema content in producing, distributing and making films featuring leading actors in the Arab world.

=== Sports ===
Alalshikh is Chairman of the Islamic Solidarity Sports Federation (ISSF), and previously Honorary President of Al Ahly in Cairo and Al-Taawoun in Buraidah. He was also the owner of the Egyptian football club Pyramids from 2018 to 2019.

On 2 August 2019, he became the owner of Almería, replacing Alfonso García Gabarrón. He named Mohamed El Assy as general director of the club. On 16 May 2025, Almería announced that Alalshikh sold the club to a group of investors from Saudi Arabia, led by SMC Group.

Alalshikh has told ESPN he plans to fix 'broken' boxing. With Alalshikh at the helm, Saudi Arabia has hosted a series of high-profile fights. His favourite boxers are Larry Holmes and Roberto Duran.

In 2024, Oscar De La Hoya sold The Ring magazine to Alalshikh for $10 million.

In June 2025, Alalshikh co-founded the Zuffa Boxing promotion company with UFC CEO Dana White.

In September 2025, it was reported that Alalshikh was preparing a formal bid to buy EFL Championship club Bristol City.

The summer of 2026 saw speculation of a potential investment or takeover of Derby County by Al-Sheikh from then owner David Clowes, with a deal reported to be close and waiting Independent Football Regulator approval in late July 2026. On 10 August 2026, Derby County released a statement that deal which been approved by the EFL and IFR, but Alalshikh's Lion Sport consortium had withdrawn from the deal and that Clowes Developments had taken the club "off the market".

== Human rights abuses ==
Alalshikh has been accused of severe human rights violations in his role as a "key on-the-ground operator" in Mohammed bin Salman's rise to power. In April 2024, a special report in The Athletic reported that he orchestrated a campaign of repression, including arbitrary detentions, enforced disappearances, and torture. According to multiple sources, those detained for social media posts criticizing Alalshikh were imprisoned in an area of al-Ha'ir prison which detainees called the "Tutu Wing", referencing his nickname.

Alalshikh wrote and publicly circulated a song that proclaimed the innocence of Saud al-Qahtani, who had been implicated in the murder of Jamal Khashoggi on behalf of Mohammed bin Salman.

In another case, the Egyptian singer Amal Maher reportedly filed a police report in 2018 accusing Alalshikh of assault. After receiving threats, she disappeared from public view for over two years, cryptically announcing her retirement from music. No charges were ever brought against Alalshikh.

== Personal life ==
Alalshikh married the daughter of Salman bin Abdulaziz Al Saud’s chief of staff. His wedding was attended by Mohammed bin Salman.

He has been diagnosed with several forms of cancer since 2015 and has sought treatment in New York.

Alalshikh has attracted attention for his multiple public tantrums, such as throwing his controller at the television after losing a video game match to former Al-Nassr owner Saud al-Suwailem.

== Awards ==
- In 2017, Alalshikh won the Arab Sport Culture Award and was named the most influential Arab sports personality of the year at the 12th Dubai International Sports Conference. In 2018, he won the Arab Sports Personality Award.
- In 2024, The Independent ranked him first on its list of "Top 50 Most Influential Figures in Boxing and MMA".
- Topped ESPN’s list of “Most Influential Figures in MMA and Professional Wrestling.
- The World Boxing Council (WBC) awarded him the “Man of the Year” award at the 62nd annual World Boxing Council Convention.
- Received the “Most Influential Personality of the Last Decade” award in 2024, presented by the MENA Effie Awards.
