= General Entertainment Authority =

Saudi government entertainment authority

General Entertainment Authority (GEA)
- الهيئة العامة للترفيه

Agency overview
- Formed: May 7, 2016; 10 years ago
- Jurisdiction: Government of Saudi Arabia
- Headquarters: Riyadh
- Agency executive: Turki Al-Sheikh, President
- Website: gea.gov.sa

The General Entertainment Authority (GEA) (Note: Arabic: الهيئة العامة للترفيه, Al-Hayʾah al-ʿĀmmah li-t-Tarfīh; formerly the General Authority for Entertainment (GAE)) is an independent government authority in Saudi Arabia that regulates and develops the country's entertainment sector. It was established in May 2016 by royal decree as part of Saudi Vision 2030 to broaden entertainment offerings and support economic diversification.

== History ==
The General Entertainment Authority was established on 7 May 2016 in accordance with a Royal Decree No. (A/133) issued by King Salman. Among the king's royal decree which included 67 announcements, the General Authority for Culture was the only other entity to be created.

== Mission ==
The General Entertainment Authority states that its mission is to develop and enable an attractive and vibrant entertainment sector that stimulates investment, supports sustainable growth and provides comprehensive, high-quality entertainment offerings in Saudi Arabia. Its vision is to lead a thriving and sustainable entertainment sector that contributes to enriching quality of life.

The Saudi population spends $22 billion dollars in tourism and entertainment outside the country every year. The government aims to transform 25% of that spending into local travel and entertainment to create a solid Saudi tourism economy. The Saudi Vision 2030 plan aims to raise capital by harnessing the previously unaddressed entertainment sector, helping to "nurture entertainment in all its forms, while also seeking to safeguard our precious cultural heritage".

The General Authority for Entertainment defines the vision and evolution of the Saudi Arabia’s entertainment industry. It partners with both public and private actors, to reduce government spending on entertainment. In December 2016, the General Authority for Entertainment’s Chairman, Ahmed Al Khateeb, stated that the organization was created to boost citizen participation and opportunities for the youth.

== Events and entertainment facilities ==
In early 2017, Jeddah held the first-ever Saudi Comic Con. The event dedicated to films, comics and anime featured celebrity appearances and was backed by the General Authority for Entertainment.

In November 2016, Six Flags Entertainment Corporation announced planned expansions into Saudi Arabia, and the board of the GEA was appointed to manage the development of the theme parks in the country. Three parks are planned for construction, with the first one set to open by 2021.

The General Authority for entertainment launched an online entertainment calendar, Roznamah (calendar in Arabic), in order to communicate about, and compile over 300 upcoming and past events, nationwide. It features upcoming film screenings and performances by Cirque du Soleil, Universe Science, the Light Festival and the Lion King musical.

In March 2019, the GEA in collaboration with the General Sports Authority, General Culture Authority and the Saudi Commission for Tourism and National Heritage organized Sharqiah Season in the Eastern region of Saudi Arabia. Sharqiah Season is a 17-day festival that is launched in the shores of Alkhobar Corniche where many activities take place. Among such activities, the King Abdul Aziz Center for World Culture (Ithra) features the lives of many prominent artists and intellectuals from all over the world, such as Leonardo da Vinci. Moreover, 80 events were allocated this season to feature a number of Saudi cities including, Dammam, Dhahran, Alkhobar, Al-Ahsa and Jubail. As part of the Season, thousands of youngsters attended the first Saudi Colour Run in Khobar. This festival comes in the framework of the Saudi Vision 2030 that aims at boosting local tourism and entertainment. The GEA launched Riyadh Season, the largest entertainment festival in the Middle East, with more than 7,000 events held in period of 6 months. Riyadh Season was first launched in 2019 and came in its second edition in 2021.

GEA has organized the largest Quran competition and the first Adhan competition in 2019. The competition has been participated by 13,000 from 162 countries. The main aim of the contest is to highlight the cultural diversity in the Islamic World that is shown in the different Quran recitation and adhan styles.

In 29 January 2024, the first football match to ever be held in Kingdom Arena, a stadium that was built in 90 days, took place between Al Hilal and Inter Miami. The match ended in Al Hilal winning 4-3. The stadium has the capacity to accommodate 26,000-40,000 spectators.

As of 2024, figures published by the General Entertainment Authority indicate that events licensed or organized by the authority have attracted more than 120 million attendees, spanned over 100,000 event days, and involved more than 3,700 businesses in the entertainment sector.

== Structure ==
=== New Entertainment Academy ===
GEA has supported the establishment of an entertainment academy. The academy is planned to open in September 2019 and provide a number of courses and diploma programs. The academy will be located in Riyadh. The main goal of the project is to provide Saudi youth with the tools necessary to enable them to work in the flourishing entertainment sector in Saudi Arabia.

=== International Scholarship Program ===
The GEA launched an international scholarship program that aims at training and educating young Saudis in the entertainment field in a number of prestigious universities worldwide. This program is undertaken in partnership with the Qiddiya Investment Co. (QIC). The program will enable its students to have a future job in Qiddiya mega project as well as the many other entertainment projects taking place in Saudi Arabia.

=== Board ===
As of 2025, the board of the General Entertainment Authority is chaired by His Excellency Turki Bin Abdulmohsen Alalshikh.

The Board members include:

- Turki Al-Sheikh: Chairman of the Board of the General Entertainment Authority
- H.E. Mr.Ihab Ghazi Al-hashani
- Mr. Ageel Mohammed Ali Al-shaibani
- Eng. Abdullah Abdulrahman Al-rabiah
- Mrs. Noha Said Kattan
- Mr. Abdulmajeed Ahmed Al-hagbani
- Dr. Rakan Hussein Alharthy
- Mr. Mohyedin Saleh A Kamel
- Mr. Khalid Waleed Al-khudair
- Mr. Sinan Esmat Al-Saady

=== Initiatives ===
The General Entertainment Authority runs several initiatives aimed at developing talent and building the local entertainment workforce. One of these, GEA Challenges, is a national program with more than 20 challenges across over 20 different entertainment activities that looks for creative talents and gives them a chance to show their skills and compete in organized events. Another initiative, Happiness Creators, launched in 2021, focuses on training and developing people for jobs in the entertainment sector through a mix of degree and diploma programs, leadership and fellowship tracks, e-learning, and short in-person courses. The authority reports that it has supported more than 100,000 young men and women through these offerings.

== Criticism ==
Some Saudi conservatives have criticized the opening up of Saudi Arabia's entertainment sector. The GEA has defended the development of the entertainment sector as being popularly supported by the Saudi public, most of whom is under 30.

In 2019, Saudi Islamic scholar Omar Al-Muqbil criticized the GEA's policies as threatening Saudi culture. Al-Muqbil was arrested by Saudi authorities.

=== Human Rights and Free Speech Concerns ===
Human rights organizations and journalists have criticized entertainment events backed by the General Entertainment Authority as part of a wider effort by the Saudi government to improve its image abroad while repression continues inside the country. In coverage of the Riyadh Comedy Festival, which is funded by the General Entertainment Authority and promoted as one of the world’s largest comedy events, Human Rights Watch told CBS News that Saudi authorities have invested billions of dollars in high-profile sports and entertainment projects to “whitewash” the country’s human rights record and distract from what the group describes as a soaring number of executions and other abuses. CBS also highlighted the case of journalist Turki al-Jasser, who was executed in 2025 after years in detention over anonymous social media posts critical of the royal family.

Articles by TIME and CBS has also raised concerns about censorship and financial incentives at the Riyadh Comedy Festival. TIME described it as a state-sponsored event and reported that performance offers to foreign comedians included very large appearance fees, in some cases between roughly $350,000 and $1.6 million. On top of that, the contracts included clauses barring jokes that could “defame” Saudi Arabia, the royal family, the government, the legal system or religion. Some comedians have said publicly that they declined or were dropped from the festival over these restrictions or broader human rights concerns, while others have faced criticism from peers and rights groups for agreeing to perform.

== See also ==
- Tourism in Saudi Arabia
- List of tourist attractions in Riyadh
