= Zuffa Boxing =

American boxing promotional company

Boxing OpCo, LLC
- Trade name: Zuffa Boxing
- Type: Private
- Industry: Boxing promotion
- Predecessor: Zuffa, LLC (unofficial)
- Founded: September 2024; 2 years ago
- Founder: Dana White; Turki Al-Sheikh
- Headquarters: 200 5th Avenue, New York City, New York, United States
- Key people: Rakan Alharthy (CEO & Managing Director, Sela); Ari Emanuel (CEO & Executive Chairman, TKO); Dana White (Promoter); Nick Khan (Promoter); Turki Al-Sheikh (Promoter)
- Owner: Sela (60%); TKO Group Holdings (40%)
- Parent: TKO Boxing Promotions
- Subsidiaries: Zuffa Boxing Anti-Doping
- Website: https://zuffaboxing.com/

Zuffa Boxing (incorporated as Boxing OpCo, LLC) is an American professional boxing promotion company founded by CEO of the Ultimate Fighting Championship (UFC), Dana White, and Chairman of the Saudi Arabian General Entertainment Authority (GEA), Turki Al-Sheikh. The company is a joint venture between Sela and TKO Group Holdings (TKO), and is based in New York City, New York.

The promotion had its inaugural event, a fight between Canelo Álvarez and Terence Crawford, on September 13, 2025, at Allegiant Stadium in Paradise, Nevada.

== History ==
In August 2017, following the high-profile boxing match between MMA fighter Conor McGregor and boxing champion Floyd Mayweather Jr., Dana White announced his intention to enter the world of professional boxing under the "Zuffa Boxing" brand. White suggested that the existing boxing promotion landscape was "broken" and needed a centralized, promoter-driven model similar to the Ultimate Fighting Championship (UFC), of which White was then president. Despite media attention and the sale of branded merchandise, Zuffa Boxing's launch was repeatedly delayed.

In September 2024, Boxing OpCo, LLC was set up as a corporate entity, aimed at establishing a structured presence in professional boxing.

On June 18, 2025, Dana White officially announced that Sela and the UFC's parent company TKO would enter the boxing industry under the Zuffa Boxing name, reviving the brand White had originally teased in 2017. The announcement was made public through an interview with Sports Business Journal in which White reiterated that Zuffa Boxing aimed to apply the UFC's promotional model to professional boxing. The branding of TKO's boxing venture as "Zuffa Boxing" was confirmed by additional outlets the following day. The company had been officially incorporated as Boxing OpCo, LLC back in September 2024.

Shortly after the announcement, it was revealed that Zuffa Boxing would be the lead promoter of the super middleweight fight between Canelo Álvarez and Terence Crawford, scheduled for September 13, 2025, at Allegiant Stadium in Paradise, Nevada. The bout, which was streamed globally via Netflix, was organized in partnership with Zuffa Boxing's parent company Sela with the backing of The Ring Magazine and Turki Al-Sheikh, Chairman of the General Entertainment Authority of Saudi Arabia. On September 29, 2025, it was announced that Zuffa Boxing had signed a media rights agreement with Paramount Skydance for their events to air on the Paramount+ streaming service with selected events to be simulcast on CBS.

Zuffa Boxing's first event under the Paramount Skydance partnership, Zuffa Boxing 01, took place on January 23, 2026, at the Meta Apex in the Las Vegas Valley, a day prior to UFC 324. On February 26, it was announced by TKO president Mark Shapiro that Zuffa Boxing would promote the heavyweight boxing match between Tyson Fury and Arslanbek Makhmudov in London, England, which Netflix streamed on April 11, 2026. In May 2026, the UFC announced that Zuffa Boxing 07 would be held at the Bournemouth International Centre in Bournemouth, Dorset, England on June 6, marking the first mainline "Numbered" Zuffa Boxing event to be held outside of the United States and outside of the Meta Apex.

On July 9, 2026, Zuffa Boxing signed a landmark, multi-fight promotional deal with undefeated four-division world champion Shakur Stevenson, the company's highest-profile acquisition since its launch by Dana White and Turki Al-Sheikh. The promotion intends to utilize its external partnerships to feature Stevenson in high-profile cross-promotional bouts against top-tier opponents. In October 2026, Stevenson requested and was granted his release from Zuffa Boxing, having never fought for the organization.

== List of events ==
| No. | Event | Headline fight | Title(s) on the line | Date | Location | Ref |
|---|---|---|---|---|---|---|
| 1 (Note: Both Álvarez vs. Crawford: Public Workout and The Ring Presents: The Underdog were held as part of the three day undercard of Zuffa Boxing's inaugural event, Álvarez vs. Crawford: Once In A Lifetime.) | Álvarez vs. Crawford: Public Workout | Bek Nurmaganbet vs. Steven Sumpter | —N/a | September 10, 2025 | Fontainebleau Las Vegas, Winchester, Nevada, U.S. | |
| 1 | The Ring Presents: The Underdog | Anthony Olascuaga vs. Juan Carlos Camacho | WBO flyweight title | September 11, 2025 | Fontainebleau Las Vegas, Winchester, Nevada, U.S. | |
| 1 | Álvarez vs. Crawford: Once In A Lifetime | Canelo Álvarez vs. Terence Crawford | WBA (Super), WBC, IBF, WBO, The Ring and TBRB undisputed super middleweight titles | September 13, 2025 | Allegiant Stadium, Paradise, Nevada, U.S. | |
| 2 | Zuffa Boxing 01 | Callum Walsh vs. Carlos Ocampo | —N/a | January 23, 2026 | Meta Apex, Enterprise, Nevada, U.S. | |
| 3 | Zuffa Boxing 02 | José Valenzuela vs. Diego Torres | —N/a | February 1, 2026 | Meta Apex, Enterprise, Nevada, U.S. | |
| 4 | Zuffa Boxing 03 | Efe Ajagba vs. Charles Martin | —N/a | February 15, 2026 | Meta Apex, Enterprise, Nevada, U.S. | |
| 5 | Zuffa Boxing 04 | Jai Opetaia vs. Brandon Glanton | The Ring and inaugural Zuffa Boxing cruiserweight titles | March 8, 2026 | Meta Apex, Enterprise, Nevada, U.S. | |
| 6 | Zuffa Boxing 05 | Andres Cortes vs. Eridson Garcia | —N/a | April 5, 2026 | Meta Apex, Enterprise, Nevada, U.S. | |
| 7 (Note: Fury vs. Makhmudov was a co-promoted Zuffa Boxing event, held in conjunction with its parent company Sela, Gold Star Promotions, Frank Warren, and The Ring.) | Fury vs. Makhmudov | Tyson Fury vs. Arslanbek Makhmudov | —N/a | April 11, 2026 | Tottenham Hotspur Stadium, London, England, U.K. | |
| 8 | Zuffa Boxing 06 | Shane Mosley Jr. vs. Serhii Bohachuk | —N/a | May 10, 2026 | Meta Apex, Enterprise, Nevada, U.S. | |
| 9 | Zuffa Boxing 07 | Chris Billam-Smith vs. Ryan Rozicki | —N/a | June 6, 2026 | Bournemouth International Centre, Bournemouth, Dorset, England, U.K. | |
| 10 | Zuffa Boxing 08 | Edwin De Los Santos vs. José Valenzuela | —N/a | June 28, 2026 | Cosmopolitan of Las Vegas, Paradise, Nevada, U.S. | |
| 11 | Zuffa Boxing 09 | Edgar Berlanga vs. Steven Butler | —N/a | July 26, 2026 | Infosys Theater at Madison Square Garden, New York City, New York, U.S. | |
| 12 | Zuffa Boxing 10 | Aaron McKenna vs. Etinosa Oliha | vacant IBF middleweight title | August 8, 2026 | 3Arena, Dublin, Leinster, Ireland | |
| 13 (Note: Garcia vs. Benn was a co-promoted Zuffa Boxing event, held in conjunction with Golden Boy Promotions and The Ring.) | Garcia vs. Benn | Ryan Garcia vs. Conor Benn | WBC welterweight title | September 12, 2026 | T-Mobile Arena, Paradise, Nevada, U.S. | |
| 14 | Zuffa Boxing 11 | Johnny Fisher vs. Michael Pirotton | —N/a | September 26, 2026 | Copper Box Arena, London, England, U.K. | |
| 15 | Zuffa Boxing 12 | Chris Billam-Smith vs. Cheavon Clarke | —N/a | November 7, 2026 | Copper Box Arena, London, England, U.K. | |
| 16 | Zuffa Boxing 13 | Carlos Adames vs. Gerome Warburton | —N/a | November 14, 2026 | The Venue, Riyadh, Saudi Arabia | |
| 17 | Zuffa Boxing 14 | Aaron McKenna vs. Jevgenijs Aleksejevs | IBF middleweight title | December 4, 2026 | The Venue, Riyadh, Saudi Arabia | |

== Controversies ==
=== Muhammad Ali American Boxing Revival Act ===
The Muhammad Ali American Boxing Revival Act was introduced in July 2025 by Representatives Brian Jack and Sharice Davids. The legislation was largely driven by TKO Group Holdings, the parent company of the Zuffa Boxing. Central to the bill was the creation of Unified Boxing Organizations (UBOs), entities that would function outside the jurisdiction of the established sanctioning bodies, the WBC, WBA, WBO, and IBF and would be exempt from certain Muhammad Ali Boxing Reform Act requirements, including mandatory disclosure of event revenue to fighters. The bill drew backing from Mike Tyson and Lonnie Ali, widow of Muhammad Ali, the latter describing it as a way to introduce greater competition into the sport's governance structure. Opposition came from Oscar De La Hoya and Evander Holyfield, who warned that UBOs would hand TKO the same monopolistic grip over boxing that the UFC holds over mixed martial arts. Nico Ali Walsh, a professional boxer and grandson of Muhammad Ali, also came out against the bill.

The United States House Committee on Education and Workforce cleared the bill by a 30–4 margin in January 2026, before the full House passed it through a voice vote on March 24, 2026, sending it to the Senate. A hearing before the United States Senate Committee on Commerce, Science, and Transportation followed in April 2026, with TKO board member Nick Khan and ABC president Tim Shipman arguing for passage, while De La Hoya and Ali Walsh reiterated their opposition.

== See also ==
- 2026 in Zuffa Boxing
- List of Zuffa Boxing world champions
