= 2026 in Zuffa Boxing =

Information
- Promotion: Zuffa Boxing
- First date: January 23, 2026
- Last date: November 14, 2026
- Last date aired: November 14, 2026

Events
- Total events: 15

Fights
- Total fights: 126

2026 in Zuffa Boxing refers to the second year that Zuffa Boxing, a professional boxing promotion founded by CEO of the Ultimate Fighting Championship (UFC) Dana White and Chairman of the General Entertainment Authority (GEA) Turki Al-Sheikh, has promoted events. So far, Zuffa Boxing has held 15 events in 2026.

== Broadcast ==
Starting from 2026, all Zuffa Boxing events will be livestreamed exclusively on Paramount+ in the U.S.

Country/Region	Broadcasters			
Country/Region	Free	Cable TV	PPV	Stream
United States	YouTube (Pre-show)	—N/a		Paramount+
Brazil	YouTube (Pre-show)	—N/a		Paramount+
Latin America	YouTube (Pre-show)	—N/a		Paramount+
Germany	YouTube (Pre-show)	Bild	—N/a	
Malaysia	YouTube (Pre-show)	Astro	—N/a	
Pakistan	YouTube (Pre-show)	—N/a		Begin
Poland	YouTube (Pre-show)	TVP Polonia	—N/a	
Turkey	YouTube (Pre-show)	S Sport	—N/a	S Sport
Vietnam	YouTube (Pre-show)	—N/a		FPT Play
Bosnia and Herzegovina	YouTube (Pre-show)	Arena Sport	—N/a	
Croatia	YouTube (Pre-show)	Arena Sport	—N/a	
Montenegro	YouTube (Pre-show)	Arena Sport	—N/a	
North Macedonia	YouTube (Pre-show)	Arena Sport	—N/a	
Serbia	YouTube (Pre-show)	Arena Sport	—N/a	
Kosovo	YouTube (Pre-show)	Arena Sport	—N/a	
Slovenia	YouTube (Pre-show)	Arena Sport	—N/a	
Estonia	YouTube (Pre-show)	TV3	—N/a	
Latvia	YouTube (Pre-show)	TV3	—N/a	
Lithuania	YouTube (Pre-show)	TV3	—N/a	
Belgium	YouTube (Pre-show)	VOO	—N/a	
Bulgaria	YouTube (Pre-show)	Diema Sport	—N/a	
Ukraine	YouTube (Pre-show)	Setanta Sports	—N/a	
China	YouTube (Pre-show)	Migu	—N/a	
Worldwide	YouTube	—N/a	—N/a	

== Zuffa Boxing 01 ==
Zuffa Boxing 01
- Date: January 23, 2026
- Venue: Meta Apex, Enterprise, Nevada, U.S.

Tale of the tape
Boxer	Callum Walsh	Carlos Ocampo
Nickname	"King"	"War"
Hometown	Cork, Ireland	Ensenada, Mexico
Pre-fight record	15–0 (11 KOs)	38–3 (26 KOs)
Height	6 ft 0 in (183 cm)	5 ft 10+1/2 in
Style	Orthodox	Orthodox

Result
- Walsh defeated Ocampo via Unanimous Decision. (98–90 Walsh, 98–90 Walsh, 97–91 Walsh)

Zuffa Boxing 01 featured Callum Walsh vs. Carlos Ocampo, a middleweight professional boxing match contested between Irish boxer Callum Walsh and Mexican boxer Carlos Ocampo. The event took place on January 23, 2026 at the Meta Apex in Enterprise, Nevada, part of the Las Vegas Valley, United States.

=== Background ===
On September 29, 2025, Paramount Skydance and TKO Group Holdings announced a long-term media rights agreement making Paramount+ the exclusive home for Zuffa Boxing, with events to be rolled out numbered. In December 2025, reports stated that Zuffa Boxing would host their second ever event on January 23 at the Meta Apex, marked as "Zuffa Boxing 01". On January 10, 2026, Dana White announced Callum Walsh vs. Carlos Ocampo as the headliner for Zuffa Boxing 01.

=== Bonus awards ===
The following fighters received $50,000 bonuses.

- Fight of the Night: Julian Rodriguez vs. Cain Sandoval
- Performance of the Night: Julian Rodriguez and Robert Meriwether III

=== Card ===
Weight class		vs		Method	Round	Time	Notes
Main Card (Paramount+)
Middleweight	Callum Walsh	def.	Carlos Ocampo	UD	10
Middleweight	Misael Rodríguez	def.	Austin Deanda	RTD	4/10	3:00
Welterweight	Julian Rodriguez	def.	Cain Sandoval	UD	10
Preliminary Card (Paramount+)
Featherweight	Omar Trinidad	def.	Max Ornelas	TKO	10/10	0:30
Bantamweight	Floyd Diaz	def.	Guillermo Gutierrez	UD	8
Bantamweight	Emiliano Cárdenas	def.	Marcus Harris	UD	6
Lightweight	Robert Meriwether III	def.	Cesar Correa	UD	6
Lightweight	Troy Nash	def.	Jaycob Ramos	UD	6

== Zuffa Boxing 02 ==
Zuffa Boxing 02
- Date: February 1, 2026
- Venue: Meta Apex, Enterprise, Nevada, U.S.

Tale of the tape
Boxer	José Valenzuela	Diego Torres
Nickname	El Rayo ("Lightning")	Azabache ("Jet")
Hometown	Los Mochis, Mexico	Zapopan, Mexico
Pre-fight record	14–3 (9 KOs)	22–1 (19 KOs)
Height	5 ft 10 in (178 cm)	5 ft 8 in (173 cm)
Style	Southpaw	Orthodox
Recognition	Former WBA super lightweight champion	

Result
- Valenzuela defeated Torres via Unanimous Decision. (99-91 Valenzuela, 99–91 Valenzuela, 99–91 Valenzuela)

Zuffa Boxing 02 featured José Valenzuela vs. Diego Torres, a lightweight professional boxing match contested between Mexican boxers José Valenzuela and Diego Torres. The event is scheduled to take place on February 1, 2026 at the Meta Apex in Enterprise, Nevada, part of the Las Vegas Valley, United States.

=== Background ===
Zuffa Boxing's third event, marked as "Zuffa Boxing 02", was announced on January 21 for February 1 to be held at the Meta Apex, just over two weeks from their first event under the Paramount Skydance partnership. It was headlined by José Valenzuela vs. Diego Torres.

=== Bonus awards ===
The following fighters received $50,000 bonuses.

- Fight of the Night: Serhii Bohachuk vs. Radzhab Butaev
- Performance of the Night: José Valenzuela and Radivoje Kalajdzic

=== Card ===
Weight class		vs		Method	Round	Time	Notes
Main Card (Paramount+)
Lightweight	José Valenzuela	def.	Diego Torres	UD	10
Middleweight	Serhii Bohachuk	def.	Radzhab Butaev	SD	10
Light Heavyweight	Radivoje Kalajdzic	def.	Oleksandr Gvozdyk	KO	7/10	2:47
Preliminary Card (Paramount+)
Middleweight	Jalil Hackett	vs.	Roberto Cruz Jr	MD	10
Lightweight	Justin Viloria	def.	Oscar Perez	UD	8
Catchweight	Damoni Cato-cain	def.	Christian Morales	UD	8
Heavyweight	Damazion Vanhouter	def.	Julian Gomez	TKO	3/6	1:27
Cruiserweight	Jamar Talley	vs.	Devonte Williams	KO	2/6	2:59

== Zuffa Boxing 03 ==
Zuffa Boxing 03
- Date: February 15, 2026
- Venue: Meta Apex, Enterprise, Nevada, U.S.

Tale of the tape
Boxer	Efe Ajagba	Charles Martin
Nickname	"The Silent Roller"	"Prince"
Hometown	Ughelli, Nigeria	St. Louis, Missouri, U.S.
Pre-fight record	20–1–1 (14 KOs)	30–4–1 (27 KOs)
Height	6 ft 5 in (196 cm)	6 ft 5 in (196 cm)
Style	Orthodox	Southpaw
Recognition		Former IBF Heavyweight Champion

Result
- Ajagba defeated Martin via round 4 TKO.

Zuffa Boxing 03 featured Efe Ajagba vs. Charles Martin, a heavyweight professional boxing match contested between Nigerian contender Efe Ajagba and American former IBF heavyweight champion Charles Martin. The event took place on February 15, 2026 at the Meta Apex in Enterprise, Nevada, part of the Las Vegas Valley, United States.

=== Background ===
In January 2026, prior to the first numbered Zuffa Boxing event, reports stated that former IBF heavyweight champion Charles Martin would take on Efe Ajagba in the headline fight at Zuffa Boxing 02. On January 30, Ajagba vs. Martin was instead officially announced as the headliner of the Zuffa Boxing 03 event on February 15 at the Meta Apex.

=== Bonus awards ===
The following fighters received $50,000 bonuses.

- Fight of the Night: Mark Beuke vs. Antonio Woods
- Performance of the Night: Umar Dzambekov and Jaybrio Pe Benito

=== Card ===
Weight class		vs		Method	Round	Time	Notes
Main Card (Paramount+)
Heavyweight	Efe Ajagba	def.	Charles Martin	TKO	4/10	1:11
Light Heavyweight	Umar Dzambekov	def.	Ahmed Elbiali	KO	2/10	0:57
Lightweight	Jaybrio Pe Benito	def.	Abel Mejia	TKO	3/8	0:48
Preliminary Card (Paramount+)
Super Welterweight	Leo Ruiz	def.	Casey Streeter	TKO	4/8	1:23
Middleweight	Mark Beuke	def.	Antonio Woods	SD	8
Lightweight	Oswaldo Molina	def.	Joshua Clark	UD	6
Super Bantamweight	Emiliano Alvarado	def.	Devin Gantt	TKO	4/6	1:24
Lightweight	Dariial Kuchmenov	def.	Jorge Lagunas	TKO	4/6	1:32

== Zuffa Boxing 04 ==
Zuffa Boxing 04
- Date: March 8, 2026
- Venue: Meta Apex, Enterprise, Nevada, U.S.
- Titles on the line: The Ring and inaugural Zuffa Boxing cruiserweight titles

Tale of the tape
Boxer	Jai Opetaia	Brandon Glanton
Hometown	Sydney, Australia	Atlanta, Georgia, U.S.
Pre-fight record	29–0 (23 KOs)	21–3 (18 KOs)
Height	6 ft 2 in (188 cm)	6 ft 0 in (183 cm)
Style	Southpaw	Orthodox
Recognition	IBF and The Ring cruiserweight champion	

Result
- Opetaia defeated Glanton via Unanimous Decision. (119–106 Opetaia, 119–106 Opetaia, 119–106 Opetaia)

Zuffa Boxing 04 featured Jai Opetaia vs. Brandon Glanton, a cruiserweight professional boxing match contested between IBF and The Ring cruiserweight champion Jai Opetaia and Brandon Glanton for the inaugural Zuffa Boxing and The Ring cruiserweight titles. The event took place on March 8, 2026 at the Meta Apex in Enterprise, Nevada, part of the Las Vegas Valley, United States.

=== Background ===
In January 2026, Zuffa Boxing announced the signing of Australian IBF and The Ring cruiserweight champion Jai Opetaia. Later that month, Zuffa announced that Opetaia will headline Zuffa Boxing 04, with an opponent to be confirmed at a later date. On February 11, Opetaia's opponent was announced as Brandon Glanton and the bout will be for the inaugural Zuffa Boxing cruiserweight title.

=== Bonus awards ===
The following fighters received $50,000 bonuses.

- Fight of the Night: Pablo Rubio vs. Adan Palma
- Performance of the Night: Ricardo Salas and Emiliano Alvarado

=== Card ===
Weight class		vs		Method	Round	Time	Notes
Main Card (Paramount+)
Cruiserweight	Jai Opetaia (c)	def.	Brandon Glanton	UD	12		^{Note 1}
Welterweight	Ricardo Salas	def.	Jesus Saracho	TKO	8/10	2:05
Featherweight	Pablo Rubio	def.	Adan Palma	UD	8
Preliminary Card (Paramount+)
Welterweight	Vlad Panin	def.	Shinard Bunch	TKO	9/10	2:29
Heavyweight	Joshua Juarez	vs.	Jardae Anderson	NC	8		^{Note 2}
Featherweight	Jaycob Ramos	vs.	Ethan Perez	MD	6
Lightweight	Brady Ochoa	vs.	Adrian Miguel Serrano	MD	6
Featherweight	Emiliano Alvarado	def.	Erick Rosado	UD	6

^Note 1 For The Ring and inaugural Zuffa Boxing cruiserweight titles.
^Note 2 Originally UD win for Juarez, overturned after he tested positive for clomiphene.

== Zuffa Boxing 05 ==
Zuffa Boxing 05
- Date: April 5, 2026
- Venue: Meta Apex, Enterprise, Nevada, U.S.

Tale of the tape
Boxer	Andres Cortes	Eridson Garcia
Nickname	"Savage"	
Hometown	Las Vegas, Nevada, U.S.	Santo Domingo, Dominican Republic
Pre-fight record	24–0 (13 KOs)	23–1 (14 KOs)
Height	5 ft 7 in (170 cm)	5 ft 8 in (173 cm)
Style	Orthodox	Southpaw

Result
- Cortes defeated Garcia via Unanimous Decision. (97–92 Cortes, 96–93 Cortes, 95–94 Cortes)

Zuffa Boxing 05 featured Andres Cortes vs. Eridson Garcia, a lightweight professional boxing match contested between American boxer Andres Cortes and Dominican boxer Eridson Garcia. The event took place on April 5, 2026 at the Meta Apex in Enterprise, Nevada, part of the Las Vegas Valley, United States.

=== Background ===
The event marked the promotion's 5th visit to Meta Apex.

A lightweight bout between Andres Cortes and Eridson Garcia headlined the event.

Emiliano Cárdenas was scheduled to face Alexis Alvarado, but the bout was moved to Zuffa Boxing 06 in May.

=== Bonus awards ===
The following fighters received $50,000 bonuses.

- Fight of the Night: Tony Hirsch Jr vs. Robert Meriwether III
- Performance of the Night: Mark Magsayo and Alexis De la Cerda

=== Card ===
Weight class		vs		Method	Round	Time	Notes
Main Card (Paramount+)
Lightweight	Andres Cortes	def.	Eridson Garcia	UD	10
Lightweight	Mark Magsayo	def.	Feargal McCrory	TKO	5/10	0:21
Featherweight	Azat Hovhannisyan	def.	Eduardo Baez	MD	10
Preliminary Card (Paramount+)
Featherweight	Alexis De La Cerda	def.	Ervin Fuller III	KO	3/8	2:33
Lightweight	Tony Hirsch Jr	def.	Robert Meriwether III	MD	8
Welterweight	Jorge Maravillo	def.	Elias Diaz	TKO	5/8	2:46
Featherweight	Troy Nash	def.	Bryan Rodriguez	MD	8

== Zuffa Boxing 06 ==
Zuffa Boxing 06
- Date: May 10, 2026
- Venue: Meta Apex, Enterprise, Nevada, U.S.

Tale of the tape
Boxer	Shane Mosley Jr.	Serhii Bohachuk
Nickname		"El Flaco"
Hometown	Pomona, California, U.S.	Vinnytsia, Ukraine
Pre-fight record	22–5 (11 KOs)	27–3 (24 KOs)
Height	6 ft 1 in (185 cm)	6 ft 0 in (183 cm)
Style	Orthodox	Orthodox
Recognition		Former interim WBC light middleweight champion

Result
- Mosley Jr. defeated Bohachuk via round 6 TKO.

Zuffa Boxing 06 featured Shane Mosley Jr. vs. Serhii Bohachuk, a middleweight professional boxing match contested between American former interim WBC middleweight title challenger Shane Mosley Jr. and Ukrainian former interim WBC light middleweight champion Serhii Bohachuk. The event took place on May 10, 2026 at the Meta Apex in Enterprise, Nevada, part of the Las Vegas Valley, United States.

=== Background ===
The event marked the promotion's 6th visit to Meta Apex.

A middleweight bout between American former interim WBC middleweight title contender Shane Mosley Jr. and Ukrainian former interim WBC light middleweight champion Serhii Bohachuk headlined the event.

Emiliano Cárdenas faced Alexis Alvarado at this event. The bout was originally scheduled to take place at Zuffa Boxing 05 in April, but was moved to this event.

Rakhmatullo Boymatov was scheduled to face Al Stanton. However, Stanton withdrew from the fight and was replaced by Caleb Hall.

=== Bonus awards ===
The following fighters received $50,000 bonuses.

- Fight of the Night: Andreas Katzourakis vs. Misael Rodriguez
- Performance of the Night: Shane Mosley Jr. and Ivan Ortiz

=== Card ===
Weight class		vs		Method	Round	Time	Notes
Main Card (Paramount+)
Middleweight	Shane Mosley Jr.	def.	Serhii Bohachuk	TKO	6/10	2:38
Welterweight	Julian Rodriguez	def.	James Perella	UD	10
Middleweight	Andreas Katzourakis	def.	Misael Rodriguez	UD	10
Preliminary Card (Paramount+)
Light Heavyweight	Suray Mahmutovic	def.	Raphael Monny	SD	8
Lightweight	Ivan Ortiz	def.	Justin Viloria	UD	8
Heavyweight	Damazion Vanhouter	def.	Raphael Murphy	TKO	1/8	1:06
Bantamweight	Alexis Alvarado	def.	Emiliano Cardenas	MD	6
Light Heavyweight	Rakhmatullo Boymatov	def.	Caleb Hall	TKO	1/6	2:42

== Zuffa Boxing 07 ==
Zuffa Boxing 07
- Date: June 6, 2026
- Venue: Bournemouth International Centre, Bournemouth, Dorset, England, U.K.

Tale of the tape
Boxer	Chris Billam-Smith	Ryan Rozicki
Nickname	"The Gentleman"	"Bruiser"
Hometown	Epsom, England, U.K.	Sydney Forks, Nova Scotia, Canada
Pre-fight record	21–2 (13 KOs)	21–1–1 (20 KOs)
Height	6 ft 3 in (191 cm)	6 ft 2 in (188 cm)
Style	Orthodox	Orthodox
Recognition	Former WBO cruiserweight champion	

Result
- Billam-Smith defeated Rozicki via round 7 RTD.

Zuffa Boxing 07 featured Chris Billam-Smith vs. Ryan Rozicki, a cruiserweight professional boxing match contested between English former WBO cruiserweight champion Chris Billam-Smith and Canadian former WBC bridgerweight title and interim WBC cruiserweight title challenger Ryan Rozicki. The event took place on June 6, 2026 at the Bournemouth International Centre, Bournemouth, Dorset, England, U.K..

=== Background ===
In May 2026, the UFC announced that Zuffa Boxing 07 would be held at the Bournemouth International Centre in Bournemouth, Dorset, England on June 6, marking the first mainline "Numbered" Zuffa Boxing event to be held outside of the United States and outside of the Meta Apex.

A cruiserweight bout between English former WBO cruiserweight champion Chris Billam-Smith and Canadian former WBC bridgerweight title and interim WBC cruiserweight title challenger Ryan Rozicki headlined the event.

Alex MacMillan was scheduled to face Tyler Rivers. However, Rivers withdrew from the fight and was replaced by Leo Fanthome.

=== Bonus awards ===
The following fighters received $50,000 bonuses.

- Fight of the Night: Chris Billam-Smith vs. Ryan Rozicki
- Performance of the Night: Cheavon Clarke and Sam Hickey

=== Card ===
Weight class		vs		Method	Round	Time	Notes
Main Card (Paramount+)
Cruiserweight	Chris Billam-Smith	def.	Ryan Rozicki	RTD	7/10	3:00
Cruiserweight	Cheavon Clarke	def.	Jack Massey	TKO	7/10	1:24
Middleweight	Lee Cutler	def.	Aaron Sutton	TKO	3/10	0:31
Middleweight	Stevie McKenna	def.	Casey James Streeter	TKO	1/8	1:04
Middleweight	Sam Hickey	def.	Todd Tompkins	TKO	2/6	1:22
Preliminary Card (Paramount+)
Heavyweight	Ivan Dychko	def.	Harvey Dykes	SD	10
Light Heavyweight	Leon Hughes	def.	Mario Vergiev	TKO	3/6	0:52
Middleweight	Alex MacMillan	def.	Leo Fanthome	TKO	2/6	1:44

== Zuffa Boxing 08 ==
Zuffa Boxing 08
- Date: June 28, 2026
- Venue: Cosmopolitan of Las Vegas, Paradise, Nevada, U.S.

Tale of the tape
Boxer	Edwin De Los Santos	José Valenzuela
Nickname	"La Granada"	El Rayo ("Lightning")
Hometown	Santo Domingo, Dominican Republic	Los Mochis, Mexico
Pre-fight record	17–2 (15 KOs)	15–3 (9 KOs)
Height	5 ft 8 in (173 cm)	5 ft 10 in (178 cm)
Style	Southpaw	Southpaw
Recognition		Former WBA super lightweight champion

Result
- Valenzuela defeated De Los Santos via round 2 KO.

Zuffa Boxing 08 featured Edwin De Los Santos vs. José Valenzuela, a lightweight professional boxing match contested between Dominican former WBC lightweight title challenger Edwin De Los Santos and Mexican-born American former WBA super lightweight champion José Valenzuela. The event took place on June 28, 2026 at the Cosmopolitan of Las Vegas, Paradise, Nevada, United States.

=== Background ===
The event marked the promotion's 7th visit to Las Vegas and first outside of Meta Apex.

A lightweight bout between Dominican former WBC lightweight title challenger Edwin De Los Santos and Mexican-born American former WBA super lightweight champion José Valenzuela headlined the event. The pair previously met in September 2022, where De Los Santos won via third‑round knockout.

=== Bonus awards ===
The following fighters received $50,000 bonuses.

- Fight of the Night: Cain Sandoval vs. Brandun Lee
- Performance of the Night: Jose Valenzuela and Tony Hirsch Jr

=== Card ===
Weight class		vs		Method	Round	Time	Notes
Main Card (Paramount+)
Lightweight	José Valenzuela	def.	Edwin De Los Santos	KO	2/10	2:05
Featherweight	Omar Trinidad	def.	Jerwin Ancajas	UD	10
Welterweight	Cain Sandoval	def.	Brandun Lee	MD	10
Preliminary Card (Paramount+)
Bantamweight	Andres Teran	def.	Floyd Diaz	TKO	6/10	1:29
Lightweight	Tony Hirsch Jr	def.	Jaybrio Pe Benito	KO	3/8	2:12
Welterweight	Damoni Cato-Cain	def.	Vernon Brown	UD	8
Lightweight	Adrian Serrano	def.	Brady Ochoa	UD	6
Heavyweight	Jakhongir Zokirov	def.	Zach Spiller	TKO	2/6	2:02

== Zuffa Boxing 09 ==
Zuffa Boxing 09
- Date: July 26, 2026
- Venue: Infosys Theater at Madison Square Garden, New York City, New York, U.S.

Tale of the tape
Boxer	Edgar Berlanga	Steven Butler
Nickname	"The Chosen One"	"Bang Bang"
Hometown	Brooklyn, New York City, U.S.	Montreal, Canada
Pre-fight record	23–2 (18 KOs)	38–5–1 (32 KOs)
Height	6 ft 1 in (185 cm)	5 ft 11 in (180 cm)
Style	Orthodox	Orthodox

Result
- Berlanga defeated Butler via round 7 TKO.

Zuffa Boxing 09 featured Edgar Berlanga vs. Steven Butler, a super middleweight professional boxing match contested between American former unified super middleweight titles challenger Edgar Berlanga and Canadian former WBO middleweight title challenger Steven Butler. The event took place on July 26, 2026 at the Infosys Theater at Madison Square Garden, New York City, New York, U.S.

=== Background ===
The event marked the promotion's first visit to New York City.

A super middleweight bout between American former unified super middleweight titles challenger Edgar Berlanga and Canadian former WBO middleweight title challenger Steven Butler headlined the event.

Ethan Perez was scheduled to face Jaycob Ramos in rematch of their bout at Zuffa Boxing 04 ended a draw. However, Ramos withdrew from the fight and was replaced by Troy Nash.

=== Bonus awards ===
The following fighters received $50,000 bonuses.

- Fight of the Night: Andres Sosa vs. Dominique Francis
- Performance of the Night: Jalil Hackett and Vladyslav Sirenko

=== Card ===
Weight class		vs		Method	Round	Time	Notes
Main Card (Paramount+)
Super Middleweight	Edgar Berlanga	def.	Steven Butler	TKO	7/10	1:14
Welterweight	Richardson Hitchins	def.	Ricardo Salas	UD	10
Middleweight	Jalil Hackett	def.	Sergiy Derevyanchenko	UD	10
Preliminary Card (Paramount+)
Heavyweight	Vladyslav Sirenko	def.	Otto Wallin	KO	10/10	2:59
Welterweight	Emiliano Moreno	def.	Arnold Gonzalez	UD	8
Heavyweight	Kashaun Davis	def.	Mihai Nistor	UD	8
Featherweight	Troy Nash	def.	Ethan Perez	MD	8
Super Featherweight	Andres Sosa	def.	Dominique Francis	UD	8

== Zuffa Boxing 10 ==
Zuffa Boxing 10
- Date: August 8, 2026
- Venue: 3Arena, Dublin, Leinster, Ireland
- Titles on the line: vacant IBF middleweight title

Tale of the tape
Boxer	Aaron McKenna	Etinosa Oliha
Nickname	"Silencer"	"El Chapo"
Hometown	Monaghan, Ireland	Turin, Italy
Pre-fight record	20-0 (10 KOs)	22–0 (10 KOs)
Height	6 ft 3 in (191 cm)	5 ft 11 in (180 cm)
Style	Orthodox	Orthodox

Result
- McKenna defeated Oliha via Unanimous Decision. (118–110 McKenna, 117–111 McKenna, 116–112 McKenna)

Zuffa Boxing 10 featured Aaron McKenna vs. Etinosa Oliha, a middleweight professional boxing match contested between Irish boxer Aaron McKenna and Italian boxer Etinosa Oliha for vacant IBF middleweight title. The event took place on August 8, 2026 at the 3Arena, Dublin, Leinster, Ireland.

=== Background ===
The event marked the promotion's first visit to Ireland and second outside of United States.

An IBF middleweight title bout between Irish boxer Aaron McKenna and Italian boxer Etinosa Oliha headlined the event.

Patrick O'Connor was scheduled to face Ibrahim Mercan. However, Mercan withdrew from the fight and was replaced by Juan Manuel Moriel.

=== Bonus awards ===
The following fighters received $50,000 bonuses.

- Fight of the Night: Joe Ward vs. Artjom Kasparian
- Performance of the Night: Aaron McKenna and Sam Hickey

=== Card ===
Weight class		vs		Method	Round	Time	Notes
Main Card (Paramount+)
Middleweight	Aaron McKenna	def.	Etinosa Oliha	UD	12		^{Note 1}
Middleweight	Callum Walsh	def.	Tyler Denny	UD	10
Light Heavyweight	Joe Ward	def.	Artjom Kasparian	UD	10
Middleweight	Sam Hickey	def.	Brad Axe	KO	7/8	0:27
Middleweight	Louis Greene	def.	Daniel Buciuc	PTS	6
Preliminary Card (Paramount+)
Middleweight	Stevie McKenna	def.	Owen O’Neill	TKO	1/8	1:05
Middleweight	Connor Coyle	def.	Mark Beuke	UD	10
Cruiserweight	Patrick O’Connor	def.	Juan Manuel Moriel	RTD	1/6	3:00

^Note 1 For vacant IBF middleweight title.

== Zuffa Boxing 11 ==
Zuffa Boxing 11
- Date: September 26, 2026
- Venue: Copper Box Arena, London, England, U.K.

Tale of the tape
Boxer	Johnny Fisher	Michael Pirotton
Nickname	"The Romford Bull"	"Bomaye"
Hometown	Harold Wood, London, England, U.K.	Liege, Belgium
Pre-fight record	14–1 (12 KOs)	12–2 (6 KOs)
Height	6 ft 4 in (193 cm)	6 ft 5 in (196 cm)
Style	Orthodox	Orthodox

Result
- Fisher defeated Pirotton via Majority Decision. (95–95, 98–92 Fisher, 96–95 Fisher)

Zuffa Boxing 11 featured Johnny Fisher vs. Michael Pirotton, a heavyweight professional boxing match contested between English boxer Johnny Fisher and Belgium boxer Michael Pirotton. The event took place on September 26, 2026 at the Copper Box Arena, London, England, U.K.

=== Background ===
The event marked the promotion's second visit to U.K. and first to London.

A heavyweight bout between English boxer Johnny Fisher and Belgian boxer Michael Pirotton headlined the event.

Leon Hughes was scheduled to face Michael Stephenson. However, Hughes withdrew from the fight due to injury and the bout was removed from this event.

Kayla Allen was scheduled to face Lisa Mronz. However, Mronz withdrew from the fight and was replaced by Edina Kiss.

=== Bonus awards ===
The following fighters received $50,000 bonuses.

- Fight of the Night: Rogelio Romero vs. Aurel Ignat
- Performance of the Night: Radivoje Kalajdzic and Leo Ruiz

=== Card ===
Weight class		vs		Method	Round	Time	Notes
Main Card (Paramount+)
Heavyweight	Johnny Fisher	def.	Michael Pirotton	MD	10
Light Heavyweight	Radivoje Kalajdzic	def.	Craig Richards	UD	10
Middleweight	Lee Cutler	def.	Louis Greene	UD	10
Super Lightweight	Kayla Allen	def.	Edina Kiss	RTD	3/6	2:00
Middleweight	Leo Ruiz	def.	Cesar Mateo Tapia	UD	10
Super Welterweight	Alex MacMillan	def.	Guillaume Azagier	TKO	2/6	0:32
Preliminary Card (Paramount+)
Cruiserweight	Rogelio Romero	def.	Aurel Ignat	TKO	3/8	2:12
Featherweight	Alexis de la Cerda	def.	Cain Lewis	UD	8
Lightweight	Fred Pullen	def.	Leonardo Faretina	PTS	4

== Zuffa Boxing 12 ==
Zuffa Boxing 12
- Date: November 7, 2026
- Venue: Copper Box Arena, London, England, U.K.

Tale of the tape
Boxer	Chris Billam-Smith	Cheavon Clarke
Nickname	"The Gentleman"	"C4"
Hometown	Epsom, England, U.K.	Montego Bay, Jamaica
Pre-fight record	22–2 (14 KOs)	12–2 (9 KOs)
Height	6 ft 3 in (191 cm)	6 ft 0 in (183 cm)
Style	Orthodox	Southpaw
Recognition	Former WBO cruiserweight champion	

Result
- Clarke defeated Billam-Smith via round 7 TKO.

Zuffa Boxing 12 featured Chris Billam-Smith vs. Cheavon Clarke, a cruiserweight professional boxing match contested between English former WBO cruiserweight champion Chris Billam-Smith and Jamaican-born British-French boxer Cheavon Clarke. The event took place on November 7, 2026 at the Copper Box Arena, London, England, U.K.

=== Background ===
The event marked the promotion's third visit to U.K. and second to London.

A cruiserweight professional boxing match contested between English former WBO cruiserweight champion Chris Billam-Smith and Jamaican-born British-French boxer Cheavon Clarke headlined the event. The pair previously met twice at amateur tournaments, including senior 91kg final of the 2016 ABA Championships, and Clarke won both meetings.

Sam Hickey was scheduled to face Troy Coleman. However, Coleman withdrew from the fight and was replaced by Amaury Massenaux.

=== Bonus awards ===
The following fighters received $50,000 bonuses.

- Fight of the Night: Denzel Bentley vs. Shane Mosley Jr.
- Performance of the Night: Cheavon Clarke and Umar Dzambekov

=== Card ===
Weight class		vs		Method	Round	Time	Notes
Main Card (Paramount+)
Cruiserweight	Cheavon Clarke	def.	Chris Billam-Smith	TKO	7/10	1:24
Middleweight	Denzel Bentley	def.	Shane Mosley Jr.	UD	10
Heavyweight	Damazion Vanhouter	def.	Ivan Balaz	TKO	1/8	2:04
Middleweight	Sam Hickey	def.	Amaury Massenaux	TKO	5/8	2:31
Super Lightweight	Kayla Allen	def.	Julia Igel	PTS	6
Cruiserweight	Lucas Roehrig	def.	Connal McDonald	TKO	7/8	0:58
Preliminary Card (Paramount+)
Light Heavyweight	Umar Dzambekov	def.	Zach Parker	KO	4/10	1:47
Middleweight	Vinnie Kemp	def.	Liam McElhinney	TKO	1/4	2:33
Featherweight	Masood Abdulah	def.	Adan Palma	UD	8

== Zuffa Boxing 13 ==
Zuffa Boxing 13
- Date: November 14, 2026
- Venue: The Venue, Riyadh, Saudi Arabia

Tale of the tape
Boxer	Carlos Adames	Gerome Warburton
Nickname	"Caballo Bronco"	"Bread maker"
Hometown	Comendador, Dominican Republic	Bodelwyddan, Denbighshire, Wales
Pre-fight record	25-1-1 (18 KOs)	18-2-2 (2 KOs)
Height	5 ft 11 in (180 cm)	5 ft 11 in (180 cm)
Style	Orthodox	Southpaw
Recognition	WBC middleweight champion	

Result
- Adames defeated Warburton via Unanimous Decision. (100-90 Adames, 98-92 Adames, 99-91 Adames)

Zuffa Boxing 13 featured Carlos Adames vs. Gerome Warburton, a super middleweight professional boxing match contested between Dominican WBC middleweight champion Carlos Adames and Welsh boxer Gerome Warburton. The event took place on November 14, 2026 at The Venue, Riyadh, Saudi Arabia.

=== Background ===
The event marked the promotion's first visit to Saudi Arabia.

A non-title super middleweight professional boxing match contested between Dominican WBC middleweight champion Carlos Adames and Welsh boxer Gerome Warburton headlined the event.

=== Bonus awards ===
The following fighters received $50,000 bonuses.

- Fight of the Night: Alexander Castro vs. Radzhab Butaev
- Performance of the Night: Jason Moloney and Dariial Kuchmenov

=== Card ===
Weight class		vs		Method	Round	Time	Notes
Main Card (Paramount+)
Super Middleweight	Carlos Adames	def.	Gerome Warburton	UD	10
Bantamweight	Jason Moloney	def.	Andres Teran	UD	10
Super Middleweight	Bruno Surace	def.	Kamil Bednarek	UD	10
Preliminary Card (Paramount+)
Welterweight	Rayan Awaji	def.	Sudais Lubega	TKO	3/4	2:15
Heavyweight	Jakhongir Zokirov	def.	Brandon Colantonio	RTD	1/6	3:00
Middleweight	Alexander Castro	def.	Radzhab Butaev	MD	10
Featherweight	Abdulaziz Alotaibi	def.	Ezra Ssaili	UD	4
Lightweight	Dariial Kuchmenov	def.	Ivan Ortiz	SD	8
Light Heavyweight	Rakhmatullo Boymatov	def.	Moro Kanla	KO	1/8	1:29

== Zuffa Boxing 14 ==
Zuffa Boxing 14
- Date: December 4, 2026
- Venue: The Venue, Riyadh, Saudi Arabia
- Titles on the line: IBF middleweight title

Tale of the tape
Boxer	Aaron McKenna	Jevgenijs Aleksejevs
Nickname	"Silencer"	"The Hurricane"
Hometown	Monaghan, Ireland	Riga, Latvia
Pre-fight record	21-0 (10 KOs)	20-0 (10 KOs)
Height	6 ft 3 in (191 cm)	6 ft 0 in (183 cm)
Style	Orthodox	Orthodox
Recognition	IBF middleweight champion	

Zuffa Boxing 14 featured Aaron McKenna vs. Jevgenijs Aleksejevs, a middleweight professional boxing match contested between Irish IBF middleweight champion Aaron McKenna and Latvian boxer Jevgenijs Aleksejevs. The event will take place on December 4, 2026 at The Venue, Riyadh, Saudi Arabia.

=== Background ===
The event marked the promotion's second visit to Saudi Arabia.

An IBF middleweight title bout between current champion Irish Aaron McKenna and Latvian boxer Jevgenijs Aleksejevs is scheduled to headline the event.

=== Card ===
Weight class		vs		Method	Round	Time	Notes
Card (Paramount+)
Middleweight	Aaron McKenna	vs.	Jevgenijs Aleksejevs		-(12)		^{Note 1}
Cruiserweight	Jack Massey	vs.	Andrew Tabiti		-(10)
Light Heavyweight	Zak Chelli	vs.	Jesse Hart		-(10)
Cruiserweight	Ryan Rozicki	vs.	Gaetan Ntambwe		-(10)
Heavyweight	Vladyslav Sirenko	vs.	Charles Martin		-(10)
Light Heavyweight	Artjom Kasparian	vs.	Suray Mahmutovic		-(8)
Cruiserweight	Jamar Talley	vs.	Sherif Musah		-(8)
Welterweight	Alex MacMillan	vs.	TBA		-(6)
Welterweight	Raheem Animashaun	vs.	TBA		-(6)

^Note 1 For IBF middleweight title.

== See also ==
- Zuffa Boxing
- List of Zuffa Boxing world champions
