= Ryan Rozicki =

Canadian boxer (born 1995)

Personal information
- Nickname: Bruiser
- Born: Ryan Joseph Rozicki; February 20, 1995 (age 31) Sydney Forks, Nova Scotia, Canada
- Occupation: Boxer
- Years active: 2016–present
- Height: 187.9 cm (6 ft 2 in)
- Weight: Cruiserweight; Bridgerweight
- Spouse: Charlie Riina (m. 2024)
- Children: 1

Boxing career
- Stance: Orthodox

Boxing record
- Total fights: 24
- Wins: 21
- Win by KO: 20
- Losses: 2
- Draws: 1

Ryan Rozicki (born February 20, 1995) is a Canadian professional boxer who challenged for the WBC bridgerweight title in 2021.

== Career ==
Rozicki started boxing at the age of 15. He made his professional debut on October 15, 2016, defeating Donald Willis via third-round technical knockout (TKO) at the Aitken Centre in Fredericton, New Brunswick and in June 2018 signed with Three Lions Promotions. He won the CPBC North American cruiserweight title in 2017, stopping journeyman Álvaro Enriquez in the second round to move to 5–0. Rozicki knocked out the previously undefeated Abokan Bokpe on October 20, 2018 for the vacant WBA-NABA Canada cruiserweight title. On 18 May 2019, Rozicki defeated American Shawn Miller via third-round KO for the vacant WBC International Silver cruiserweight title in Sydney, Nova Scotia.

In October 2021, Rozicki was announced as Óscar Rivas's opponent for the inaugural WBC bridgerweight title in Montreal, replacing Bryant Jennings due to issues regarding Canada's COVID-19 quarantine policy.

Rozicki fought Yamil "Jara" Peralta for the WBC international cruiserweight title in front of a hometown crowd at Sydney, Nova Scotia's Centre 200 on May 7, 2022. Rozicki made headlines by acknowledging his opponent had won the boxing match through a statement on live network TV, directly after the decision was announced. Rozicki was initially awarded in a controversial split decision. The day after the title fight, the WBC nullified the victory and declared the title vacant. In explaining its decision, the WBC said that the official report from the supervisor they had assigned to the event stated that Peralta had in fact won the fight and that the local judges had incorrectly awarded the title to Rozicki. According to the report, all four ring officials present during the fight had been appointed by the local boxing authority, a matter that had been strongly objected to prior to the fight. In the aftermath, the WBC appointed a panel of officials to review the fight and it was unanimously determined that Peralta should have been awarded the title. Host of the show and Rozicki’s promoter Daniel Otter, respected the decision of the WBC and the duo’s sportsmanship was recognized and appreciated from the WBC, shown through a statement made from the organizations president, Mauricio Sulaiman.

Rozicki was scheduled to return to the competitive boxing ring after more than a year away against Gerardo Mellado at Centre 200 in Sydney, Nova Scotia, on 7 March 2026. He knocked his opponent to the canvas twice in the second round, leading the referee to step in to stop the fight and award him the win by technical knockout.

He fought Chris Billam-Smith at Bournemouth International Centre in Bournemouth, England, on 6 June 2026. Rozicki lost when his corner retired him at the end of round seven.

== Personal life ==
In March 2020, Ryan Rozicki was charged with offences following a domestic disturbance. In January 2021, Rozicki pleaded guilty to charges of assault and mischief relating to property damage.

== Professional boxing record ==
24 fights	21 wins	2 losses
By knockout	20	1
By decision	1	1
Draws	1	

No.	Result	Record	Opponent	Type	Round, time	Date	Location	Notes
24	Loss	21–2–1	Chris Billam-Smith	RTD	7 (10), 3:00	Jun 6, 2026	Bournemouth International Centre, Bournemouth, England	
23	Win	21–1–1	Gerardo Mellado	TKO	2 (10), 1:01	Mar 3, 2026	Centre 200, Sydney, Nova Scotia, Canada	
22	Draw	20–1–1	Yamil Peralta	MD	12	Dec 7, 2024	Centre 200, Sydney, Nova Scotia, Canada	For vacant interim WBC cruiserweight title
21	Win	20–1	Olanrewaju Durodola	TKO	1 (10), 1:47	Dec 12, 2023	Emera Centre Northside, North Sydney, Nova Scotia, Canada	
20	Win	19–1	Alante Green	KO	10 (10), 1:55	Sep 30, 2023	Hamilton Convention Centre, Hamilton, Ontario, Canada	Won NABF cruiserweight title
19	Win	18–1	Zamig Atakishiyev	TKO	3 (10), 1:14	Jun 10, 2023	Halifax Forum, Halifax, Nova Scotia, Canada	
18	Win	17–1	Arturs Gorlovs	KO	3 (10), 2:29	Feb 11, 2023	Hamilton Convention Centre, Hamilton, Ontario, Canada	
17	Win	16–1	Mario Aguilar	KO	1 (10), 2:19	Dec 2, 2022	Centre 200, Sydney, Nova Scotia, Canada	
16	Win	15–1	Yamil Peralta	SD	10	May 7, 2022	Centre 200, Sydney, Nova Scotia, Canada	For vacant WBC International cruiserweight title; despite Rozicki winning, a complaint from Peralta's team over unfair judging compelled the WBC to leave the title vacant and to declare the bout a no contest; however, the result was upheld by the Nova Scotia Combat Sport Authority who oversaw the fight.
15	Win	14–1	German Montes	TKO	2 (8), 2:59	Mar 19, 2022	Hamilton Convention Centre, Hamilton, Ontario, Canada	
14	Loss	13–1	Óscar Rivas	UD	12	Oct 22, 2021	Olympia Theatre, Montreal, Quebec, Canada	For inaugural WBC bridgerweight title
13	Win	13–0	Sylvera Louis	TKO	6 (8)	Apr 23, 2021	Griffins Studio, Vancouver, British Columbia, Canada	
12	Win	12–0	Vladimir Reznicek	TKO	3 (8)	Feb 14, 2020	Centre 200, Sydney, Nova Scotia, Canada	Retained WBC International Silver cruiserweight title
11	Win	11–0	Khetag Pliev	TKO	2 (8)	Sep 7, 2019	Convention Centre, Hamilton, Ontario, Canada	
10	Win	10–0	Shawn Miller	KO	3 (10)	May 18, 2019	Centre 200, Sydney, Nova Scotia, Canada	Won vacant WBC International Silver cruiserweight title
9	Win	9–0	Laszlo Penzes	KO	2 (8)	Mar 16, 2019	Convention Centre, Hamilton, Ontario, Canada	
8	Win	8–0	Abokan Bopke	KO	1 (8)	Oct 20, 2018	Convention Centre, Hamilton, Ontario, Canada	Won vacant WBA–NABA Canadian cruiserweight title
7	Win	7–0	Mate Krisof	TKO	1 (6)	Jun 16, 2018	Ancaster Fairgrounds, Ancaster, Ontario, Canada	
6	Win	6–0	Victor Hugo Correa Cedillo	KO	2 (10)	May 19, 2018	Centre 200, Sydney, Nova Scotia, Canada	Won vacant CPBC North American cruiserweight title
5	Win	5–0	Álvaro Enriquez	TKO	2 (6)	Apr 21, 2018	Pictou County Wellness Centre, New Glasgow, Nova Scotia, Canada	
4	Win	4–0	Kristof Demendi	TKO	1 (8)	Nov 25, 2017	Centre 200, Sydney, Nova Scotia, Canada	
3	Win	3–0	Shane Upshaw	TKO	3 (6)	Aug 19, 2017	Festival Arena, Shediac, New Brunswick, Canada	
2	Win	2–0	Ray Sayers	TKO	1 (4)	May 27, 2017	Aitken Centre, Fredericton, New Brunswick, Canada	
1	Win	1–0	Donald Willis	TKO	3 (4)	Oct 15, 2016	Aitken Centre, Fredericton, New Brunswick, Canada	
