= Sam Hickey =

Scottish boxer (born 2000)

Personal information
- Nationality: Scotland
- Born: 5 January 2000 (age 26) Dundee, Scotland

Boxing career

Boxing record
- Total fights: 7
- Wins: 7
- Win by KO: 4
Medal record
Men's amateur boxing
Representing Scotland
European Championships
Bronze medal – third place	2022 Yerevan	Middleweight
Commonwealth Games
Gold medal – first place	2022 Birmingham	Middleweight

Sam Hickey (born 5 January 2000) is a Scottish professional boxer. As an amateur he won a gold medal at the 2022 Commonwealth Games and bronze at the 2022 European Championships.

== Amateur career ==
Hickey competed in the 2022 European Amateur Boxing Championships, being awarded the bronze medal in the middleweight event. He was defeated in the semi-final by English boxer Lewis Richardson by a 4-1 judges' decision. Hickey was the first Scot to win a senior European medal for 16 years.

He won the gold medal in the middleweight division at the 2022 Commonwealth Games in Birmingham, England.

== Professional career ==
On 4 July 2024, Hickey announced he had turned professional. He made his professional debut at the Copper Box Arena in London, England, on 19 October 2024, defeating Colombian fighter John Henry Mosquera on points with the referee awarding him all four rounds. In his second pro-fight, Hickey stopped Lewis Howells in round one at Park Community Arena in Sheffield, England, on 11 January 2025.

Next he defeated Harley Hodgetts on points over six rounds at Oakwell in Barnsley, England, on 7 June 2025. Hickey recorded his fourth professional win by overcoming Aljaz Venko on points in a six-round contest at First Direct Arena in Leeds, England, on 20 December 2025.

In May 2026, he signed a promotional contract with Zuffa Boxing. His first fight under his new promotors was a second round stoppage win over Todd Tompkins at Bournemouth International Centre in Bournemouth, England, on 6 June 2026.

On 8 August 2026, Hickey faced Brad Axe at 3Arena in Dublin, Ireland, winning by knockout in the seventh of their scheduled eight-round contest. Next he stopped Amaury Massenaux in the fifth round at the Copper Box Arena in London, England, on 7 November 2026.

== Achievements ==
Year	Competition	Location	Position	Event
2022	European Amateur Boxing Championships	Yerevan, Armenia	3rd	Men's middleweight
2022	Commonwealth Games	Birmingham, England	1st	Men's middleweight

== Professional boxing record ==
7 fights	7 wins	0 losses
By knockout	4	0
By decision	3	0

No.	Result	Record	Opponent	Type	Round, time	Date	Location	Notes
7	Win	7–0	Amaury Massenaux	TKO	5 (8), 2:31	7 Nov 2026	Copper Box Arena, London, England	
6	Win	6–0	Brad Axe	KO	7 (8), 0:27	8 Aug 2026	3Arena, Dublin, Ireland	
5	Win	5–0	Todd Tompkins	TKO	2 (6), 1:23	6 Jun 2026	Bournemouth International Centre, Bournemouth, England	
4	Win	4–0	Aljaz Venko	PTS	6	20 Dec 2025	First Direct Arena, Leeds, England	
3	Win	3–0	Harley Hodgetts	PTS	6	7 Jun 2025	Oakwell, Barnsley, England	
2	Win	2–0	Lewis Howells	TKO	1 (6), 2:59	11 Jan 2025	Park Community Arena, Sheffield, England	
1	Win	1–0	John Henry Mosquera	PTS	4	19 Oct 2024	Copper Box Arena, London, England	
