= Canelo Álvarez vs. Terence Crawford =

2025 professional boxing match

Once In A Lifetime
- Date: September 13, 2025
- Venue: Allegiant Stadium, Paradise, Nevada, U.S.
- Title(s) on the line: WBA (Super), WBC, IBF, WBO, The Ring and TBRB undisputed super middleweight titles

Tale of the tape
Boxer	Saúl Álvarez	Terence Crawford
Nickname	Canelo ("Cinnamon")	Bud
Hometown	Guadalajara, Jalisco, Mexico	Omaha, Nebraska, U.S.
Pre-fight record	63–2–2 (39 KO)	41–0 (31 KO)
Age	35 years, 1 month	37 years, 11 months
Height	5 ft 7 1/2 in (171 cm)	5 ft 8 in (173 cm)
Weight	167 1/2 lb (76 kg)	167 1/2 lb (76 kg)
Style	Orthodox	Southpaw (Note: Listed by BoxRec as southpaw, but regularly switch-hits as an orthodox.)
Recognition	WBA (Super), WBC, IBF, WBO, The Ring and TBRB; Undisputed Super Middleweight Champion; The Ring No. 8 ranked pound-for-pound fighter 4-division world champion	WBA (Super); Light Middleweight Champion; The Ring; No. 1 Ranked Light Middleweight; The Ring No. 3 ranked pound-for-pound fighter 4-division world champion

Result
- Crawford wins via 12-round unanimous decision (116–112, 115–113, 115–113)

Canelo Álvarez vs. Terence Crawford, billed as Once In A Lifetime and There Can Only Be One, was a super middleweight professional boxing match contested between undisputed super middleweight champion Canelo Álvarez and four-division champion Terence Crawford for the undisputed super middleweight championship of the world.

It was the first Zuffa Boxing event promoted by Dana White under TKO. The bout took place on September 13, 2025, at Allegiant Stadium in Paradise, Nevada, U.S. (southwest of adjacent Las Vegas) and was streamed worldwide on Netflix. Additionally, Zuffa Boxing and Turki Al-Sheikh's Ring magazine promoted two undercard events for the fight on September 10 and 11 at the Fontainebleau Las Vegas.

== Background ==
In January 2025, it was reported that a bout between Saúl "Canelo" Álvarez and Terence Crawford had been agreed to be held in September 2025 in Las Vegas by Saudi promoter Turki Al-Sheikh.

However, on February 6, The Ring magazine reported that Al-Sheikh suspended the bout after reports stated Álvarez was in negotiations to face YouTuber-turned-boxer Jake Paul in May. Hours later it was reported that Álvarez and Paul were close to finalizing a May 3 bout at T-Mobile Arena. Ultimately, Al-Sheikh announced that Álvarez had signed a 4-fight deal with Riyadh Season thus ending the negotiations with Paul and putting the Crawford bout back on track for September.

On May 3, after Álvarez defeated William Scull to reclaim his IBF super middleweight title, Crawford entered the ring and the two had a face off. Al-Sheikh later announced that the bout would take place on September 12 in conjunction with Dana White's new Zuffa Boxing league under TKO. On June 10, the bout was officially announced to take place on September 13 and would be broadcast on Netflix. On June 17, Allegiant Stadium was officially confirmed as the host venue. It was later reported that to secure the fight date of September 13, an NCAA college football game between the UNLV Rebels and the Idaho State Bengals, which had been originally scheduled to take place on the same day as the fight at Allegiant Stadium, was rescheduled to August 23. In addition, TKO agreed to pay $1.75 million alongside giving 100 tickets and a suite to UNLV's athletic department for the fight.

In August, Zuffa Boxing's sister company WWE and its Mexican subsidiary Lucha Libre AAA Worldwide announced the Worlds Collide wrestling event, which took place on September 12 in Las Vegas as a lead-in to the boxing match. Prior to the Álvarez vs. Crawford fight, TKO also promoted UFC Fight Night: Lopes vs. Silva, the third edition of the UFC's annual "Noche UFC" MMA event celebrating Mexican culture, on September 13. Worlds Collide, UFC Fight Night: Lopes vs. Silva, and Álvarez vs. Crawford were all held as part of Mexican Independence Day weekend, a major weekend for Mexican combat sports.

On August 24, 2025, the WBA announced that Crawford would forfeit the light middleweight title at the start of the fight, with Abass Baraou being elevated to the position of full WBA champion, thereby maintaining the title's active status in that division.

In July 2025, Turki Al-Sheikh announced that the undercard for the Álvarez vs. Crawford fight would likely take place across "two or three days". This was later confirmed in September when Al-Sheikh and Zuffa Boxing announced the Álvarez vs. Crawford: Public Workout and The Underdog events for September 10 and 11, respectively. Both events were held at the Fontainebleau Las Vegas.

== Fight details ==
Following the fight announcement, Álvarez and Crawford went on a three-city press tour to promote the fight. The first stop was in Riyadh on June 20, followed by New York City on June 22 and Las Vegas on June 27. At the kickoff presser in Riyadh, Turki Al-Sheikh, tired of what he calls "Tom & Jerry fights", announced a knockout bonus that will be implemented in future fights he promotes, starting with Álvarez vs. Crawford.

Crawford responded to rumors concerning a shoulder injury during an event in Las Vegas, expressing skepticism about the speculation. He assured reporters that he was not injured and criticized the assertions regarding his fitness and speed. Crawford affirmed that he was at his natural weight and rejected claims that his physique would impact his performance.

Dana White confirmed that Turki Alalshikh would present two sets of $100,000 bonuses on fight night. The 'Fight of the Night' bonus to be awarded to both participants, with each receiving $100,000. Additionally, the 'Performance of the Night' bonus to be given to a standout individual, allowing one fighter the opportunity to earn a total of $200,000 in bonus cash in addition to their purse.

During fight week, betting odds for the fight significantly narrowed. Álvarez was slightly favored at minus-165, while Crawford stood at plus-135. Initially, Álvarez was over a 2–1 favorite when the bout was first announced.

At the official weigh-ins, both fighters came in at 167.5 pounds (76.0 kg), the highest weight of Crawford's career.

=== Titles, stakes, and records ===
In addition to the WBA, WBC, IBF and WBO world titles, The Ring created an exclusive belt, which cost upwards of $188,000 to make, that would be awarded to the winner. According to Rick Reeno of The Ring magazine, it is "the most expensive belt ever created." On September 2, 2025, the WBC officially presented the Nahui Huey Altepemeh commemorative belt, which will also be on the line in this fight. On September 10, the WBC unveiled the first-ever WBC Crown Series Undisputed Championship ring. Designed by Rasheen Farlow and created by Jason of Beverly Hills, the ring has almost 10 carats of stones set onto yellow gold with 8.5 carats of white diamonds and is valued at over $100,000.

Álvarez is a four-division champion and two-time undisputed super middleweight champion, and has held championships from light middleweight through light heavyweight. Prior to his fight with Crawford, he was the only boxer in history to hold the undisputed super middleweight title and was unbeaten at super middleweight.

Crawford, a four-division champion himself, has held titles from lightweight through light middleweight and was the undisputed champion at light welterweight and welterweight. With a victory, Crawford would make history as the first male boxer to become a three-division undisputed champion in the "four-belt era" and would become the first three-division undisputed champion since Henry Armstrong accomplished the feat in 1938. He would also become the first boxer to hold The Ring magazine belt in four different weight classes, one of only six male fighters in history to capture titles in five divisions, (Note: Would join Thomas Hearns, Sugar Ray Leonard, Oscar De La Hoya, Floyd Mayweather Jr. and Manny Pacquiao.) and one of just three to claim the lineal championship in four weight classes. (Note: Would join Manny Pacquiao and Floyd Mayweather Jr..)

Across a combined 765 rounds fought in their careers, neither fighter had ever been knocked down.

=== Purses, revenue, viewership, and attendance ===
On May 28, 2025, Crawford revealed that he would receive $10 million for this fight. Most boxing insiders believe his claim is either false or represents just his guaranteed minimum. Reports suggest his actual total payout is closer to $50 million. According to SI.com, Álvarez was expected to pocket up to $150 million, which included at least $80 million as part of his deal with Riyadh Season.

On September 8, 2025, Dana White confirmed that Álvarez vs. Crawford is set to be the third biggest live gate in boxing history. 70,482 people attended the event, and set the venue's single-day live gate record by pulling in $47,231,887. It had the largest attendance for an event held at Allegiant Stadium, breaking the record of 63,969 set for the LSU–USC college football game in September 2024, and it shattered the previous record for Las Vegas boxing attendance when 29,214 fans attended the 1982 fight between Larry Holmes and Gerry Cooney, while also ranking as the second-largest indoor boxing crowd in U.S. history. Additionally, it drew over 41,400,000 viewers globally, making it the most viewed men's championship boxing fight of the 21st century.

=== Fighters' kit ===
==== Canelo Álvarez ====
Opting for designer over sportswear for the Netflix fight, Álvarez wore custom black-and-gold AMIRI boxing shoes. Styled like high-top sneakers, they combine mesh, nubuck, and leather with a custom sole engineered for grip, comfort, stability, and support. The boots feature a large folded tongue stamped with Álvarez's gold "CA" initials, a Mexican flag hangtag, AMIRI branding across the ankle, and an "MA" monogram on the heel honoring designer Mike Amiri.

==== Terence Crawford ====
Inspired by the film Desperado, Crawford's fight-night attire was co-designed by Everlast, Off-White, and Bespoke Boxing. The kit featured black velvet and Duchesse satin with colors from Off-White's Spring/Summer 2026 runway, over 1,000 hand-applied Swarovski crystals, and custom Everlast MX gloves and Elite boots. The shorts feature Crawford's last name on the waistband and the word "Omaha" across the back.

=== Countdown and Embedded series ===
On September 4, 2025, Netflix released "Countdown: Canelo vs. Crawford", a two-part docuseries offering a behind-the-scenes look at the fighters' training camps and personal lives.

On September 8, 2025, the UFC premiered the first episode of its "Embedded" series on YouTube, offering fans a glimpse into the final preparations for the Álvarez vs. Crawford showdown. The six-episode series concluded with the headliner and featured fighters making their final weight cuts for the official weigh-ins and facing off for the final time.

=== Event personnel ===
==== Broadcast team ====
Role	Name
Play-by-play	Jon Anik
Fight analyst	Max Kellerman
Fight analyst	Andre Ward
Ring announcer	Michael Buffer
Ring announcer	Joe Martinez
Reporter	Heidi Androl
Reporter	Jim Gray
Coach's corner	Skipper Kelp
Desk host	Mario Lopez
Desk analyst	Mark Kriegel
Desk analyst	Antonio Tarver
Desk analyst	Mike Coppinger

==== Officials ====
Role	Name
Referee	Thomas Taylor
Judges	Tim Cheatham
Judges	Steve Weisfeld
Judges	Max DeLuca

== Fight summary ==
Crawford, a natural switch-hitter, fought the entire contest from the southpaw stance and delivered a composed and tactically sharp performance to defeat Álvarez and become undisputed champion. Although Álvarez entered as the naturally bigger man, his power never appeared to trouble Crawford, who absorbed Álvarez's hardest punches while dictating the fight's rhythm.

The opening rounds were tightly contested. Álvarez attacked the body with his left hook and disguised his shots with level changes, while Crawford established his jab and countered effectively with straight lefts and short combinations. The fourth round produced Álvarez's first significant success when he snapped Crawford's head back with a right hand, but Crawford took it well. Álvarez carried the momentum into the fifth, his best round of the early fight, as he controlled distance and outworked Crawford from range.

The sixth marked the turning point. Crawford stood his ground, landed effectively on the inside, and connected with a clean hook to Álvarez's chin that forced him backward. Referee Thomas Taylor issued Álvarez a warning for a low blow with 1:20 to go in the sixth, but no points were deducted. From then on, Crawford controlled the tempo, mixing his jab and combinations with well-timed counters. Álvarez remained competitive, but the sharper and more telling shots came from Crawford, who grew increasingly confident in the pocket.

Round nine brought high drama when a clash of heads opened a cut over Crawford's right eye, but he responded by landing a crisp early combination before engaging Álvarez in spirited exchanges, connecting with 33 punches versus 10 from Álvarez. Though Álvarez had some success in the slower-paced tenth, Crawford reasserted control in the championship rounds, outlanding his opponent in the eleventh and trading freely in the twelfth without being troubled by Álvarez's power.

After twelve rounds, the judges returned a unanimous decision for Crawford, 116–112, 115–113 and 115–113. According to CompuBox, Crawford outlanded Álvarez 115–99 in total punches and 45–16 in jabs, while Álvarez led 83–70 in power shots, although those figures differ significantly from Jabbr.ai, which recorded Crawford landing 172 of 552 punches and Álvarez landing 68 of 338.

=== Scorecards ===
Judge	Fighter	1	2	3	4	5	6	7	8	9	10	11	12	Total
Steve Weisfeld	Crawford	10	9	9	10	10	10	10	9	10	9	10	10	116
Steve Weisfeld	Álvarez	9	10	10	9	9	9	9	10	9	10	9	9	112
Tim Cheatham	Crawford	10	9	10	10	9	10	9	9	10	9	10	10	115
Tim Cheatham	Álvarez	9	10	9	9	10	9	10	10	9	10	9	9	113
Max De Luca	Crawford	9	9	10	10	9	10	10	9	9	10	10	10	115
Max De Luca	Álvarez	10	10	9	9	10	9	9	10	10	9	9	9	113

== Fight cards ==
=== Álvarez vs. Crawford: Public Workout (September 10) ===
Weight class		vs		Method	Round	Time	Notes
Super middleweight	Bek Nurmaganbet	def.	Steven Sumpter	RTD	3/10	3:00
Super middleweight	Brayan Leon	def.	Devontae McDonald	UD	8
Flyweight	Mikie Tallon	def.	Christian Robles	UD	6
Heavyweight	Yoandy Toirac	vs.	Skylar Lacy	SD	6
Light middleweight	Abdullah Darkazanly	def.	Kody Kobowski	TKO	3/6	1:23

=== The Ring Presents: The Underdog (September 11) ===
Weight class		vs		Method	Round	Time	Notes
Flyweight	Anthony Olascuaga (c)	def.	Juan Carlos Camacho	TKO	2/12	2:33	^{Note 1}
Super featherweight	Justin Viloria	def.	Joshafat Ortiz	UD	8
Light middleweight	Jalil Hackett	def.	Elijah Vines	TKO	3/8	0:33
Super bantamweight	Emiliano Alvarado	def.	Juan Garcia	MD	6
Cruiserweight	Jamar Talley	def.	Anthony Holloway	UD	6

^Note 1 For WBO flyweight title

=== Álvarez vs. Crawford: Once In A Lifetime (September 13) ===
Weight class		vs		Method	Round	Time	Notes
Main Card (Netflix)
Super middleweight	Terence Crawford	def.	Canelo Álvarez (c)	UD	12		^{Note 1}
Light middleweight	Callum Walsh	def.	Fernando Vargas Jr.	UD	10
Super middleweight	Christian M'billi (ic)	vs.	Lester Martínez	SD	10		^{Note 2}
Lightweight	Mohammed Alakel	def.	Travis Kent Crawford	UD	10
Prelims (YouTube)
Middleweight	Brandon Adams	def.	Serhii Bohachuk	UD	10
Heavyweight	Jermaine Franklin	def.	Ivan Dychko	UD	10
Super featherweight	Reito Tsutsumi	def.	Javier Martinez	TKO	1/6	2:18
Light welterweight	Sultan Almohamed	def.	Martin Caraballo	UD	4
Light heavyweight	Raiko Santana	def.	Steven Nelson	TKO	1/10	2:38
Super middleweight	Marco Verde	def.	Sona Akale	TKO	4/6	1:11

^Note 1 For WBA (Super), WBC, IBF, WBO, The Ring and TBRB undisputed super middleweight titles
^Note 2 For WBC interim super middleweight title

== Aftermath ==
Following the victory, Crawford declared himself "the new face of boxing," emphasizing what he viewed as a career-defining performance. In his post-fight interview, Crawford reflected on Álvarez's power and technique, stating, "He didn't hit as hard as I thought he was. He's definitely technical, but I've been hit harder." He added that Álvarez became visibly discouraged as the bout progressed: "[Alvarez] was definitely frustrated, because what he was trying to do wasn't working, and when he'd get hit, he was just like, 'Man,' shaking his head like, 'I can't believe I got hit with that.'"

Álvarez echoed that assessment in his own remarks, acknowledging the difficulty he faced in solving Crawford's approach. "I tried my best tonight and I just could not figure out the style," he said, later adding, "Everything [he did gave me the most trouble]. He has everything." Álvarez also offered high praise for Crawford's performance, saying, "I think Crawford is way better than Floyd Mayweather." The following month, the WBC and WBO entered Álvarez into their rankings at #1.

Prior to the fight, it had been announced that Álvarez was scheduled to return to the ring in February 2026. During an episode of Inside The Ring, however, Mike Coppinger reported that Álvarez required elbow surgery, pushing his projected comeback to at least the third quarter of 2026. Although he did not call for an immediate rematch in the aftermath of the bout, Álvarez stated in November 2025 that he intended to pursue a second fight with Crawford. Crawford's team had issued multiple rematch offers in the months following their first meeting, and this marked the first time Álvarez publicly expressed interest in accepting one.

On December 3, the WBC stripped Crawford of their world title, claiming he had not paid $300,000 in sanctioning fees. It was described as "a slap in the face", by president Mauricio Sulaimán. Crawford responded with a video on Instagram, saying, "Boy, you've got to slap your fucking self," and adding, "The fucking real belt is the Ring belt, which is free, motherfucker. [What] you talking about? You want me to pay you more than the other sanctioning bodies because you feel like you're better than them?"

On December 14, Eddy Reynoso stated that Álvarez would not make a comeback for Cinco de Mayo in 2026, but rather go straight into a rematch with Crawford in September 2026. Two days later, Crawford announced his retirement from boxing, ending any talks of a rematch in the future.

On January 23, 2026, Zuffa Boxing held a follow-up event, Zuffa Boxing 01, which streamed live on Paramount+ from the Meta Apex in Enterprise, Nevada.

== Notes and references ==
=== References ===
Preceded by vs. William Scull	Canelo Álvarez's bouts September 13, 2025	Succeeded by vs. TBA
Preceded by vs. Israil Madrimov	Terence Crawford's bouts September 13, 2025	Retired
