= Chris Billam-Smith =

English boxer (born 1990)

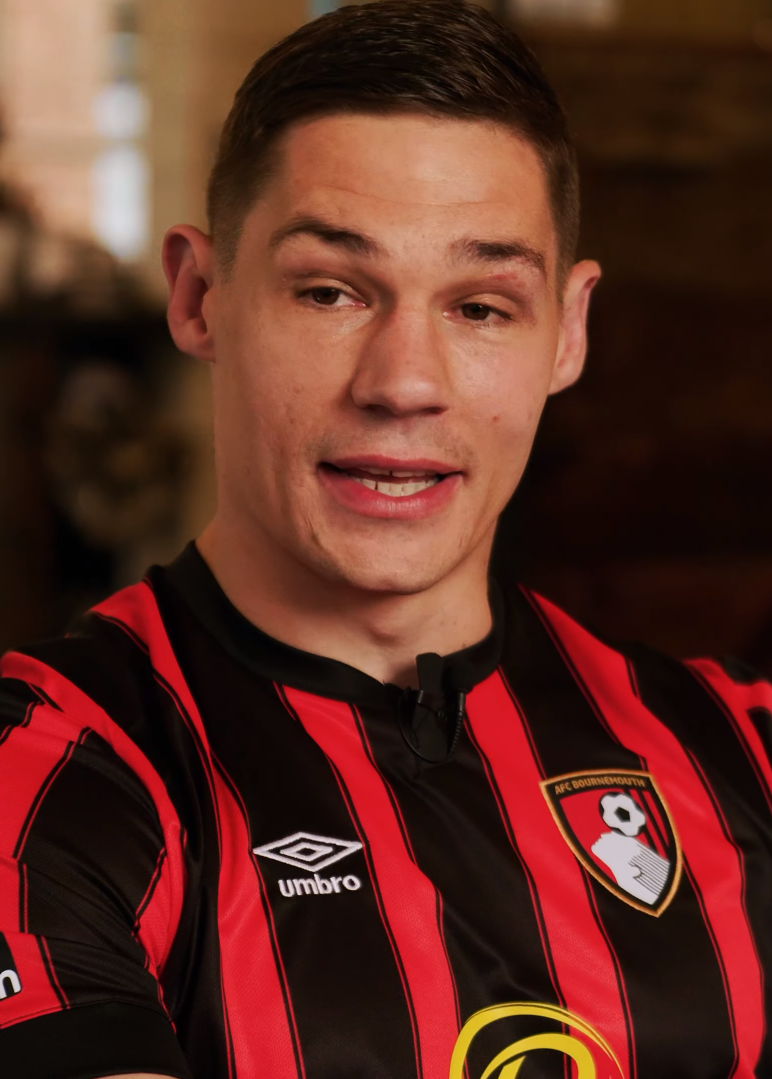
- Billam-Smith in 2024

Personal information
- Nickname: The Gentleman
- Born: 2 August 1990 (age 36) Epsom, England
- Height: 6 ft 3 in (191 cm)
- Weight: Cruiserweight

Boxing career
- Reach: 76 in (193 cm)
- Stance: Orthodox

Boxing record
- Total fights: 25
- Wins: 22
- Win by KO: 14
- Losses: 3
Medal record
Men's amateur boxing
Representing England
English National Championships
Silver medal – second place	2016 Liverpool	Heavyweight
Silver medal – second place	2013 Houghton-le-Spring	Cruiserweight
Bronze medal – third place	2012 Liverpool	Cruiserweight

Chris Billam-Smith (born 2 August 1990) is an English professional boxer. He held the World Boxing Organization (WBO) cruiserweight title from 2023 to 2024. At regional level, he held the European, British, and Commonwealth cruiserweight titles between 2019 and 2022.

== Amateur career ==
After training on and off as a youngster, Smith began to take boxing seriously at the age of 16. During a career in which he compiled a record of 32–11 while representing Poole ABC, he fought in several ABA Championships, reaching the finals in 2013 and 2016; losing out to Jack Massey at 86 kg and Cheavon Clarke at 91 kg respectively.

== Professional career ==
=== Early career ===
Billam-Smith made his professional debut on 16 September 2017 under the tutelage of Shane McGuigan, scoring a first-round technical knockout (TKO) victory over Russ Henshaw at the O2 Academy in Bournemouth, Dorset.

After compiling a record of 9–0 (8 KOs), he faced fellow undefeated British prospect Richard Riakporhe (9–0, 8 KOs) for the WBA Inter-Continental cruiserweight title on 20 July 2019 at the O2 Arena in London. The fight was televised live on Sky Sports Box Office as part of the undercard of Dillian Whyte vs. Oscar Rivas. Smith suffered his first professional defeat via split decision (SD) over ten rounds. Two judges scored the bout in favour of Riakporhe with 97–92 and 95–94, while the third scored it 96–93 to Smith.

=== Commonwealth cruiserweight champion ===
On 23 November 2019, he fought Craig Glover at the M&S Bank Arena (formerly Echo Arena), Liverpool, with the vacant Commonwealth cruiserweight title on the line. The fight was televised live on Sky Sports in the UK and streamed live on DAZN in the US as part of the undercard for Callum Smith's world title defence against John Ryder. The first-round saw both fighters engage at close-quarters, with Glover suffering a cut above his left eye in the first minute of the bout from an accidental clash of heads. In the second-round, Smith stayed at range behind the jab, landing hooks and straight right hands to bloody Glover's nose. Round three was much of the same, with Smith landing counter hooks as Glover tried to work on the inside. Glover had more success in the fourth, with both fighters landing solid jabs and hooks to the head. In the final 10 seconds of the round, Smith hurt Glover with a straight right hand and followed up with a four punch combination culminating with a left hook which dropped Glover to the canvas seconds before the bell sounding. Less than a minute into the fifth, Smith began to land a variety of heavy punches to the head of Glover, scoring a second knockdown with a powerful left hook to the jaw. Glover was able to get back to his feet before the referee's count of ten only to be met by more heavy shots from Smith, who landed two straight right hands to the side of Glover's head which promoted referee Mark Lyson to call a halt to the contest as Glover was knocked down for a third time, handing Billam-Smith the Commonwealth title via fifth-round TKO.

He made the first defence of his Commonwealth title on 7 August 2020, facing Nathan Thorley at the Matchroom Sport headquarters in Brentwood, Essex, live on Sky Sports as part of the undercard for Terri Harper's world title defence against Natasha Jonas. Following a fast start from Smith, he scored a knockdown at the end of the first round after three left hooks forced Thorley to go down on one knee. After trapping Thorley in a corner in the second round, Smith landed a series of right hands to send Thorley to the canvas for a second time. Smith scored a third knockdown with another right hand, with Thorley again making it back to his feet only to see referee Mark Lyson call a halt to the contest, handing Smith a second-round TKO victory to retain his Commonwealth title.

=== European, British & Commonwealth cruiserweight champion ===
On 31 July 2021, Billam-Smith faced Tommy McCarthy as part of Matchroom's Fight Camp in a bout where the British, European and Commonwealth cruiserweight titles were at stake. In a very competitive bout, Billam-Smith prevailed by split decision, with scores of 116–112 and 115–114 in his favour, and 115–114 in favour of McCarthy.

Billam-Smith made his first European title defense against Dylan Bregeon on 13 November 2021, at the Sheffield Arena in Sheffield, England. He won the fight by unanimous decision, with scores of 120–109, 119–109 and 119–109.

Billam-Smith fought a rematch with Tommy McCarthy on 16 April 2022, on the undercard of the Conor Benn and Chris van Heerden welterweight bout. He won the fight by an eight-round technical knockout, flooring McCarthy with a right cross.

Billam-Smith defeated Isaac Chamberlain to retain his Commonwealth and European cruiserweight titles, winning on three scorecards of 117–111. Billam-Smith vacated the EBU Cruiserweight title in July 2022.

=== WBO cruiserweight champion ===
==== Billam-Smith vs. Okolie ====
On 27 May 2023 at the Vitality Stadium in Bournemouth, England, Billam-Smith defeated Lawrence Okolie by majority decision to become the new WBO cruiserweight champion.

==== Billam-Smith vs. Masternak ====
On 10 December 2023 at the Bournemouth International Centre, England, Billam-Smith was scheduled to make the first defense of his WBO cruiserweight title against Mateusz Masternak. Billam-Smith defeated Masternak by corner retirement.

==== Billam-Smith vs. Riakporhe II ====
Billam-Smith defeated Richard Riakporhe by unanimous decision at Selhurst Park in London, England, on 15 June 2024, to retain his world title and avenge his only previous loss as a professional five years earlier. The ringside judges scored the contest 116–111, 115–112, 115–112.

==== Billam-Smith vs. Ramirez ====
Billam-Smith put his WBO cruiserweight title on the line in a world championship unification bout against WBA champion Gilberto Ramírez in Riyadh, Saudi Arabia on 16 November 2024. He lost by unanimous decision.

=== Post-title career ===
After his loss, Billam-Smith stayed focused on competing at the world level. He suffered a cut, rib damage, and injuries to both hands. He also mentioned experiencing severe pain, which necessitated a hospital visit. He expressed a desire for his next fight to be either for a world title or a title eliminator. He indicated that he had "a couple more years left."

==== Billam-Smith vs. Glanton ====
In January 2025, it was announced that Billam-Smith would compete on the undercard of Chris Eubank Jr vs. Conor Benn, which was noted as Ring Magazine's first UK card. The event was scheduled for 26 April at the Tottenham Hotspur Stadium in London. His opponent was Brandon Glanton (20–2, 17 KOs), who was on a three-fight stoppage streak. During fight week, the atmosphere was lively, with Glanton making assertive remarks about causing damage to Billam-Smith. McGuigan commented on Glanton's promotional strategies, implying they were unwarranted and that the appeal of the fight was sufficient on its own. He noted that Billam-Smith would not be influenced by Glanton's behaviour. He was fairly confident that Billam-Smith would emerge victorious. During the media workouts, Glanton engaged with the fans and said, “I’m gonna break this boy's face on Saturday.” According to Glanton, the rivalry started when Billam-Smith declined to shake his hand. This incident occurred during Billam-Smith's victory over Lawrence Okolie, an event that Glanton attended to support his friend Okolie. Billam-Smith was confident in his training and preparation for the fight, stating Glanton would just "throw lots of shots and press forward", from the beginning.

In a closely contested fight that was marked by high-intensity exchanges, body shots, and multiple knockdown scares, Billam-Smith emerged victorious, defeating Glanton via unanimous decision. Both fighters started aggressively from the opening bell, exchanging hooks, uppercuts, and body shots. As the middle rounds progressed, Billam-Smith began to take control, delivering significant blows that staggered Glanton, who also slipped twice. No knockdowns were declared due to the potentially slippery ring canvas. Billam-Smith's output and tactical adjustments allowed him to regain authority in the fight. During the championship rounds, Billam-Smith maintained his control, while Glanton's attacks became less varied. In the final round, Glanton landed some harder punches as Billam-Smith appeared fatigued. The judges scored the fight 116–113, 116–112, and 116–112. Despite the pre-fight tensions, both boxers showed mutual respect and embraced each other. Billam-Smith landed 195 of 667 total punches (29%), while Glanton landed 172 of 560 thrown (30%).

In July 2025, Billam-Smith addressed the tension leading up to the fight. He was disturbed by threats of causing "brain damage", which led him to seek guidance from his breathwork coach for emotional management. Initially, he did not hear Glanton's remarks during the press conference but later reviewed the footage, prompting him to react. Billam-Smith considered withdrawing from the fight to deny Glanton his paycheck. After the fight, he confronted Glanton, seeking an apology that he felt was overdue.

==== Inactivity ====
In August 2025, the WBO decided to create an interim title, whilst Ramírez was recovering from injury. The next contender in line was German boxer Roman Fress (23–1, 13 KOs). Billam-Smith was in favour of the fight, as he viewed it as a crucial step towards regaining a shot at the world title. Both teams were given a 20-day negotiation period. Billam-Smith planned on returning to full training by the end of September, after the birth of his second son. He saw Fress as a tough opponent. He made it clear that he was still under contract with Boxxer. With no negotiations, a purse bid was held on 3 October, however with the minimum bid being $300,000, there was no bids received. The WBO decided to explore options, with one of them being, lowering the minimum bid. A second purse bid was held on 16 October, with the minimum bid reduced to $150,000. SES Promotions won the right, bidding $156,921. With Billam-Smith entitled to 60%, this would see him take home a $94,152.60 purse. Ulf Steinforth of SES Boxing, planned to host the fight in Germany in January 2026. For Fress, this would have been his toughest fight to date, and he was on a seven-fight win streak. Billam-Smith was given deadline of 20 October to notify the WBO about his intentions. He missed the deadline to notify the WBO and president Gustavo Olivieri stated they would move on to the next contender, Umar Salamov. After opting out of the fight against Fress, Billam-Smith was looking to return in February 2026.

=== Zuffa Boxing ===
On 13 April 2026, it was announced that Billam-Smith signed a multi-fight deal with Zuffa Boxing. The deal meant Billam-Smith would return to Sky Sports, with whom Zuffa had a broadcast deal in the UK. Negotiations lasted six weeks. He stated the deal was designed to potentially be the final contract of his career, given it was a multi-fight, multi-year deal. He expected to return to the ring in the summer of 2026. His main goal was to challenge Zuffa Boxing cruiserweight champion Jai Opetaia.

==== Billam-Smith vs. Rozicki ====
On 29 April, Zuffa announced their first UK card, headlined by Billam-Smith, against Ryan Rozicki (21–1–1, 20 KOs), in a 10-round contest. The fight was scheduled to take place on 6 June, at the International Centre in Bournemouth, exclusively broadcast on Sky Sports in the United Kingdom. On the announcement, Billam-Smith said, "This is a huge opportunity for me back in front of my amazing supporters ... Zuffa Boxing is all about proper fights under the lights and that's exactly what Rozicki brings to the table." Rozicki issued a warning to Billam-Smith ahead of their bout. Despite the event’s importance, Rozicki viewed it as “just another fight” and questioned whether Billam-Smith would stand and trade as promised. His team believed his relentless pressure and aggressive style would prove decisive, anticipating a breakout performance. His promoter, Daniel Otter, said, “On June 6, the boxing world is going to discover one of boxing’s best-kept secrets, Ryan Rozicki.” Billam-Smith won the fight when Rozicki's corner retired him at the end of round seven.

==== Billam-Smith vs. Clarke ====
On 22 September, Zuffa Boxing announced a show to take place in London at the Copper Box Arena on 7 November 2026. On 25 September, it was reported that Billam-Smith would headline Zuffa Boxing 12 against Chev Clarke (12–2, 9 KOs) in a 12-round contest. Billam-Smith lost by technical knockout in round 7.

== Personal life ==
Billam-Smith is a supporter of AFC Bournemouth. Billam-Smith is married to his wife Mia and they have a son together.

== Professional boxing record ==
25 fights	22 wins	3 losses
By knockout	14	1
By decision	8	2

No.	Result	Record	Opponent	Type	Round, time	Date	Location	Notes
25	Loss	22–3	Cheavon Clarke	TKO	7 (10), 1:24	7 Nov 2026	Copper Box Arena, London, England	
24	Win	22–2	Ryan Rozicki	RTD	7 (10), 3:00	6 Jun 2026	Bournemouth International Centre, Bournemouth, England	
23	Win	21–2	Brandon Glanton	UD	12	26 Apr 2025	Tottenham Hotspur Stadium, London, England	
22	Loss	20–2	Gilberto Ramírez	UD	12	16 Nov 2024	The Venue Riyadh Season, Riyadh, Saudi Arabia	Lost WBO cruiserweight title; For WBA (Super) cruiserweight title
21	Win	20–1	Richard Riakporhe	UD	12	15 Jun 2024	Selhurst Park, London, England	Retained WBO cruiserweight title
20	Win	19–1	Mateusz Masternak	RTD	8 (12), 0:02	10 Dec 2023	Bournemouth International Centre, Bournemouth, England	Retained WBO cruiserweight title
19	Win	18–1	Lawrence Okolie	MD	12	27 May 2023	Dean Court, Bournemouth, England	Won WBO cruiserweight title
18	Win	17–1	Armend Xhoxhaj	KO	5 (12), 1:52	17 Dec 2022	Bournemouth International Centre, Bournemouth, England	
17	Win	16–1	Isaac Chamberlain	UD	12	30 Jul 2022	Bournemouth International Centre, Bournemouth, England	Retained European and Commonwealth cruiserweight titles
16	Win	15–1	Tommy McCarthy	TKO	8 (12), 1:28	16 April 2022	Manchester Arena, Manchester, England	Retained European and Commonwealth cruiserweight titles
15	Win	14–1	Dylan Bregeon	UD	12	13 Nov 2021	Sheffield Arena, Sheffield, England	Retained European cruiserweight title
14	Win	13–1	Tommy McCarthy	SD	12	31 Jul 2021	Matchroom Headquarters, Brentwood, England	Retained Commonwealth cruiserweight title; Won European and vacant British cruiserweight titles
13	Win	12–1	Vasil Ducar	UD	10	20 Mar 2021	Wembley Arena, London, England	Won vacant WBA Continental cruiserweight title
12	Win	11–1	Nathan Thorley	TKO	2 (12), 2:05	7 Aug 2020	Matchroom Headquarters, Brentwood, England	Retained Commonwealth cruiserweight title
11	Win	10–1	Craig Glover	TKO	5 (12), 1:45	23 Nov 2019	Liverpool Arena, Liverpool, England	Won vacant Commonwealth cruiserweight title
10	Loss	9–1	Richard Riakporhe	SD	10	20 Jul 2019	The O2 Arena, London, England	For WBA Inter-Continental cruiserweight title
9	Win	9–0	Yassine Habachi	RTD	3 (6), 3:00	10 May 2019	Motorpoint Arena, Nottingham, England	
8	Win	8–0	Kent Kauppinen	TKO	6 (6), 0:45	15 Dec 2018	O2 Academy, Bournemouth, England	
7	Win	7–0	Robin Dupre	RTD	5 (10), 3:00	13 Oct 2018	York Hall, London, England	
6	Win	6–0	Michal Pleanik	PTS	8	16 Jun 2018	O2 Academy, Bournemouth, England	
5	Win	5–0	Gheorghe Danut	RTD	5 (6), 3:00	9 Mar 2018	O2 Academy, Bournemouth, England	
4	Win	4–0	Laszlo Ivanyi	KO	1 (4), 2:17	2 Dec 2017	Leicester Arena, Leicester, England	
3	Win	3–0	Jan Hrazdira	KO	2 (4), 0:06	11 Nov 2017	Royal Highland Centre, Edinburgh, Scotland	
2	Win	2–0	Alexandar Todorovic	TKO	1 (4), 2:43	14 Oct 2017	Wembley Arena, London, England	
1	Win	1–0	Russ Henshaw	TKO	1 (4), 2:01	16 Sep 2017	O2 Academy, Bournemouth, England	

== See also ==
- List of world cruiserweight boxing champions
- List of British world boxing champions

Sporting positions
Regional boxing titles
Vacant Title last held by Lawrence Okolie	Commonwealth cruiserweight champion 23 November 2019 – October 2023; Vacated	Vacant Title next held by Isaac Chamberlain
Vacant Title last held by Richard Riakporhe	British cruiserweight champion 31 July 2021 – November 2022; Vacated	Vacant Title next held by Mikael Lawal
Preceded by Tommy McCarthy	European cruiserweight champion 31 July 2021 – April 2023; Vacated	Vacant Title next held by Michał Cieślak
World boxing titles
Preceded by Lawrence Okolie	WBO cruiserweight champion 27 May 2023 – 16 November 2024	Succeeded by Gilberto Ramírez
