= Umar Dzambekov =

Austrian boxer (born 1997)

Personal information
- Nationality: Austrian
- Born: Умар Джамбеков; 20 November 1997 (age 28) Grozny, Chechen Republic Of Ichkeria
- Height: 6 ft 1 in (185 cm)
- Weight: Light heavyweight

Boxing career
- Stance: Southpaw

Boxing record
- Total fights: 15
- Wins: 15
- Win by KO: 11

Umar Dzambekov (born 20 November 1997) is a Chechen-born Austrian professional boxer who competes in the light heavyweight division.

== Early life ==
At the age of six, Dzambekov fled with his family from the Chechen War and he finally received Austrian citizenship in 2018.

== Amateur career ==
At the 2019 AIBA World Boxing Championships Dzambekov got beaten in the third round by Cuban-born Azerbaijani Loren Alfonso. Dzambekov entered the qualification for the 2020 Olympics in Tokyo. He suffered an upset to Croatia's Luka Plantić.

== Professional career ==
After winning his first two pro fights Dzambekov signed for Tom Loefflers 360 Promotions. He beat the unbeaten American Kwame Ritter on points on the undercard of Serhii Bohachuk vs Patrick Allotey.

Dzambekov knocked out Ahmed Elbiali in the second round at Meta Apex in Enterprise, Nevada, United States, on 15 February 2026. He followed this up with a fourth round knockout win over Zach Parker at the Copper Box Arena in London, England, on 7 November 2026.

== Professional boxing record ==
15 fights	15 wins	0 losses
By knockout	11	0
By decision	4	0

No.	Result	Record	Opponent	Type	Round, time	Date	Location	Notes
15	Win	15–0	Zach Parker	KO	4 (10), 1:47	7 Nov 2026	Copper Box Arena, London, England	
14	Win	14–0	Ahmed Elbiali	KO	2 (10), 0:57	15 Feb 2026	Meta Apex, Enterprise, Nevada, US	
13	Win	13–0	Artem Brusov	KO	2 (10), 2:59	3 Oct 2025	Chumash Casino, Santa Ynez, California, US	
12	Win	12–0	Roamer Alexis Angulo	UD	8	21 Jun 2025	Chumash Casino, Santa Ynez, California, US	
11	Win	11–0	Sonny McEwen	KO	1 (8), 2:17	19 Apr 2025	Commerce Casino, Commerce, California, US	
10	Win	10–0	Eric Robles	KO	1 (8), 2:14	26 Oct 2024	Commerce Casino, Commerce, California, US	
9	Win	9–0	Edward Jeramie Ortiz	KO	4 (8), 0:54	31 Aug 2024	Chumash Casino, Santa Ynez, California, US	
8	Win	8–0	Frederic Julian	UD	8	9 Nov 2023	Madison Square Garden Theater, New York, New York, US	
7	Win	7–0	David Zegarra	KO	1 (8), 0:59	26 Aug 2023	Commerce Casino, Commerce, California, US	
6	Win	6–0	Kwame Ritter	UD	8	22 Jul 2023	Chumash Casino, Santa Ynez, California, US	
5	Win	5–0	Crispulo Javier Andino	KO	3 (8), 1:57	9 Jun 2023	Commerce Casino, Commerce, California, US	
4	Win	4–0	Nathan Davis Sharp	KO	3 (4), 2:24	14 Apr 2023	Commerce Casino, Commerce, California, US	
3	Win	3–0	Anthony Fleming	KO	4 (6), 1:22	27 Jan 2023	Quiet Cannon Country Club, Montebello, California, US	
2	Win	2–0	Dogan Kurnaz	RTD	1 (4)	4 Sep 2021	Hansehalle, Lübeck, Schleswig-Holstein, Germany	
1	Win	1–0	Giorgi Kandelaki	UD	4	17 Jul 2021	Haus der Begegnung, Vienna, Austria	
