= Callum Walsh =

Irish boxer (born 2001)

Personal information
- Nickname: King
- Born: 9 February 2001 (age 25) Cork, Ireland
- Height: 5 ft 9 in (1.75 m)
- Weight: Light middleweight; Middleweight

Boxing career
- Reach: 71½ in (182cm)
- Stance: Southpaw

Boxing record
- Total fights: 17
- Wins: 17
- Win by KO: 11

Callum Walsh (born 9 February 2001) is an Irish professional boxer. He competes in the light middleweight and middleweight division. He has held the World Boxing Council (WBC) Continental Americas super welterweight title since 2024.

== Professional career ==
=== Walsh vs. Jones ===
On 9 June 2023, at Commerce Casino, California, Walsh fought against veteran Carson Jones (43–15–3, 31 KOs) who had previously faced Kell Brook for a world title shot. Walsh dominated the fight, dropping Jones in the third before stopping him in the fourth round.

=== Walsh vs. Villareal ===
On 9 November 2023, Walsh faced the tough Ismael Villareal (13–1, 9 KOs) at the MSG Theatre in New York City. After dominating the early rounds, Walsh started to fatigue later in the fight. He suffered a flash knockdown in the tenth round but managed to win a unanimous decision.

=== Walsh vs. Runowski ===
On 20 September 2024, Walsh had his first fight in his home country at the 3Arena in Dublin. He became the first fighter to stop Przemyslaw Runowski (22–3–1, 6 KOs). He floored the Pole early in the second round with a body shot before dropping him for the 10 count seconds later with a powerful left hand.

=== Walsh vs. Vargas Jr. ===
On 13 September 2025, coached by Freddie Roach, Walsh fought Fernando Vargas Jr. (17–0, 15 KOs) as the co-main event of Canelo Álvarez vs. Terence Crawford at the Allegiant Stadium, Paradise, Nevada. Walsh won by unanimous decision, with scorecards of 100–90, 99–91 and 99–91.

=== Walsh vs. Ocampo ===
Walsh faced Carlos Ocampo (38–3, 26 KOs) at the Meta Apex in Enterprise, Nevada, USA, on 23 January 2026 as the main event of Dana White's first Zuffa Boxing card, titled Zuffa Boxing 01. Despite suffering a flash knockdown in the sixth round, he won the 10-round bout via unanimous decision, with two judges scoring it 98–90, and the third 97–91.

=== Walsh vs. Denny ===
Walsh faced Tyler Denny over 10 rounds at 3Arena in Dublin on 8 August 2026. He suffered a knockdown in the first round, before sending his opponent to the canvas in the second and eventually winning by unanimous decision.

== Professional boxing record ==
17 fights	17 wins	0 losses
By knockout	11	0
By decision	6	0

No.	Result	Record	Opponent	Type	Round, time	Date	Location	Notes
17	Win	17–0	Tyler Denny	UD	10	8 Aug 2026	3Arena, Dublin, Ireland	
16	Win	16–0	Carlos Ocampo	UD	10	23 Jan 2026	Meta Apex, Enterprise, Nevada, U.S.	
15	Win	15–0	Fernando Vargas Jr.	UD	10	13 Sep 2025	Allegiant Stadium, Paradise, Nevada, U.S.	
14	Win	14–0	Elias Espadas	TD	5 (10), 0:01	21 Jun 2025	Chumash Casino Resort, Santa Ynez, California, U.S.	Retained WBC Continental Americas super welterweight title.
13	Win	13–0	Dean Sutherland	KO	1 (10), 2:45	16 Mar 2025	Madison Square Garden Theater, New York City, New York, U.S.	
12	Win	12–0	Przemyslaw Runowski	KO	2 (10), 2:06	20 Sep 2024	3Arena, Dublin, Ireland	Retained WBC Continental Americas super welterweight title.
11	Win	11–0	Carlos Ortiz Cervantes	KO	2 (10), 1:50	7 Jun 2024	Chumash Casino, Santa Ynez, California, U.S.	Retained WBC Continental Americas super welterweight title.
10	Win	10–0	Dauren Yeleussinov	TKO	9 (10), 1:56	15 Mar 2024	Madison Square Garden Theater, New York City, New York, U.S.	Won vacant WBC Continental Americas super welterweight title.
9	Win	9–0	Ismael Villareal	UD	10	9 Nov 2023	Madison Square Garden Theater, New York City, New York, U.S.	Retained WBC USA Silver super middleweight title.
8	Win	8–0	Juan Jose Velasco	RTD	4 (10), 3:00	26 Aug 2023	Commerce Casino, Commerce, California, U.S	Retained WBC USA Silver super middleweight title.
7	Win	7–0	Carson Jones	KO	4 (10), 2:59	9 Jun 2023	Commerce Casino, Commerce, California, U.S	Won vacant WBC USA Silver super middleweight title.
6	Win	6–0	Wesley Tucker	TKO	2 (10), 2:59	16 Mar 2023	Agganis Arena, Boston, Massachusetts, U.S.	
5	Win	5–0	Delen Parsley	KO	3 (8), 2:26	3 Nov 2022	Quiet Cannon Country Club, Montebello, California, U.S.	
4	Win	4–0	Benjamin Whitaker	UD	6	Aug 4, 2022	Quiet Cannon Country Club, Montebello, California, U.S.	
3	Win	3–0	Luis Garcia	KO	1 (6), 1:46	May 12, 2022	Quiet Cannon Country Club, Montebello, California, U.S.	
2	Win	2–0	Gael Ibarra	KO	1 (4), 0:33	17 Mar 2022	Quiet Cannon Country Club, Montebello, California, U.S.	
1	Win	1–0	Earl Henry	KO	1 (4), 1:37	10 Dec 2021	Quiet Cannon Country Club, Montebello, California, U.S.	
