= Shane Mosley Jr. =

American boxer (born 1994)

Personal information
- Born: December 18, 1990 (age 35) Pomona, California, U.S.
- Height: 6 ft 1 in (185 cm)
- Weight: Middleweight; Super middleweight

Boxing career
- Reach: 77 in (196 cm)
- Stance: Orthodox

Boxing record
- Total fights: 29
- Wins: 23
- Win by KO: 13
- Losses: 6

Shane Mosley Jr. (born December 18, 1990) is an American professional boxer who currently competes in the super middleweight division.

== Early life ==
Mosley Jr. is the son of boxing legend and hall of famer Shane Mosley.

== Professional career ==
Mosley Jr. made his pro debut on April 26, 2014, in Port Hueneme, California. He knocked his opponent out after just 34 seconds. Mosley suffered his first defeat in his fourth professional fight against Marchristoper Adkins. He wobbled Adkins the first round but lost a split decision.

=== Mosley Jr. vs. Jacobs ===
Mosley Jr. got the biggest win of his career so far when he defeated former world middleweight champion Daniel Jacobs at the Honda Center in Anaheim, California, on July 6, 2024.

=== Mosley Jr. vs. Ramos ===
Mosley Jr. faced Jesus Ramos for the interim WBC middleweight title at the Frost Bank Center in San Antonio, Texas, on December 6, 2025. He lost via unanimous decision.

=== Zuffa Boxing ===
In February 2026, Mosley Jr. signed with Zuffa Boxing.

=== Mosley Jr. vs. Bohachuk ===
Mosley Jr. defeated Serhii Bohachuk by technical knockout in the sixth of their scheduled 10-round contest at the Meta Apex in Enterprise, Nevada, on May 10, 2026.

=== Mosley Jr. vs. Bentley ===
Mosley Jr. faced former WBO middleweight champion Denzel Bentley over 10 rounds at the Copper Box Arena in London, England, on November 7, 2026, losing via unanimous decision.

== Professional boxing record ==
27 fights	22 wins	5 losses
By knockout	12	0
By decision	10	5

No.	Result	Record	Opponent	Type	Round, time	Date	Location	Notes
29	Loss	23–6	Denzel Bentley	UD	10	7 Nov 2026	Copper Box Arena, London, England	
28	Win	23–5	Serhii Bohachuk	TKO	6 (10), 2:38	May 10, 2026	Meta Apex, Enterprise, Nevada, U.S.	
27	Loss	22–5	Jesus Ramos	UD	12	Dec 6, 2025	Frost Bank Center, San Antonio, Texas, U.S.	For the interim WBC middleweight title
26	Win	22–4	Daniel Jacobs	UD	10	Jul 6, 2024	Honda Center, Anaheim, California, U.S.	
25	Win	21–4	Joshua Conley	RTD	6 (10)	Dec 2, 2023	Toyota Center, Houston, Texas, U. S.	
24	Win	20–4	D'Mitrius Ballard	KO	7 (10)	Jun 10, 2023	Toyota Arena, Ontario, California, U.S.	
23	Win	19-4	Mario Alberto Lozano	UD	10	Feb 18, 2023	Fox Theater Pomona, Pomona, California, U. S.	
22	Win	18-4	Gabriel Rosado	MD	10	Apr 9, 2022	Alamodome, San Antonio, Texas, U. S.	
21	Loss	17-4	Jason Quigley	MD	10	May 29, 2021	Michelob Ultra Arena, Las Vegas, Nevada, U. S.	
20	Win	17-3	Cristian Olivas	RTD	5 (10)	Feb 13, 2021	Fantasy Springs Indio, Indio, California, U. S.	
19	Win	16-3	Jeremy Ramos	UD	8	Jul 24, 2020	Fantasy Springs Indio, Indio, California, U. S.	
18	Win	15-3	Calvin Metcalf	UD	10	Aug 16, 2019	Memorial Hall, Kansas City, Kansas, U. S.	
17	Win	14-3	Bernard Thomas	KO	1 (6)	Jun 1, 2019	Memorial Hall, Kansas City, Kansas, U. S.	
16	Loss	13-3	Brandon Adams	UD	10	Nov 9, 2018	Forum, Inglewood, California, U. S.	
15	Win	13-2	Michael Moore	SD	5	May 23, 2018	LADC Studios, Los Angeles, California, U. S.	
14	Win	12–2	Daniel Valdivia	UD	5	May 19, 2018	LADC Studios, Los Angeles, California, U. S.	
13	Win	11–2	Devaun Lee	KO	5 (5)	Mar 8, 2018	LADC Studios, Los Angeles, California, U. S.	
12	Loss	10-2	David Toussaint	SD	8	Jul 2, 2017	Suncorp Stadium, Brisbane, Australia	
11	Win	10–1	Demetrius Walker	KO	2 (6)	Mar 23, 2017	Exchange LA, Los Angeles, California, U. S.	
10	Win	9–1	Omar Barefield	KO	3 (6)	Dec 3, 2016	Holiday Inn, Johnson City, Tennessee, U. S.	
9	Win	8-1	Omar Rojas	UD	6	Oct 8, 2016	Sports Arena, Brownsville, Texas, U. S.	
8	Win	7–1	Roberto Yong	MD	6	May 28, 2016	Gila River Arena, Glendale, Arizona, U. S	
7	Win	6–1	Cameron Sevilla Rivera	KO	3 (4)	Mar 11, 2016	Marconi Automative Museum, Tustin, California, U. S.	
6	Win	5–1	Azamat Umarzoda	UD	4	Feb 5, 2016	Fantasy Springs Idaho, Indio, California, U. S.	
5	Win	4-1	Jerome Buchanan	KO	2 (4)	Mar 13, 2015	Marconi Automative Museum, Tustin, California, U. S.	
4	Win	3-1	Rafael Machado	TKO	3 (4)	Jan 30, 2015	Foxwoods Resort, Mashantucket, Connecticut, U. S.	
3	Loss	2-1	Marchristopher Adkins	SD	4	Sep 20, 2014	Celebrity Theater, Phoenix, Arizona, U. S.	
2	Win	2–0	Jerome Jones	TKO	1 (4)	Aug 2, 2014	Chelsea Ballroom, Las Vegas, Nevada, U. S.	
1	Win	1–0	Mark Cardova	KO	1 (4)	Apr 26, 2014	Oceanview Pavilion, Port Hueneme, Florida, U. S.	
