= Cheavon Clarke =

Jamaican-born British boxer (born 1990)

Personal information
- Nationality: Jamaican; British; French
- Born: 14 December 1990 (age 35) Montego Bay, Jamaica
- Height: 1.82 m (6 ft 0 in)
- Weight: Cruiserweight

Boxing career

Boxing record
- Total fights: 15
- Wins: 13
- Win by KO: 10
- Losses: 2
Medal record
Men's amateur boxing
Representing Great Britain
European Games
Bronze medal – third place	2019 Minsk (Note: Also designated as the 2019 men's European Championships)	Heavyweight
Representing England
European Championships
Silver medal – second place	2017 Kharkiv	Heavyweight
EU Championships
Bronze medal – third place	2018 Valladolid	Heavyweight
Commonwealth Games
Bronze medal – third place	2018 Gold Coast	Heavyweight

Cheavon Clarke (born 14 December 1990) is a Jamaican-born British-French professional boxer. At regional level, he held the British cruiserweight title from May 2024 to April 2025. As an amateur, he won a silver medal at the 2017 European Championships; and bronze at the 2018 Commonwealth and 2019 European Games.

== Amateur career ==
Clarke competed for Jamaica in the 2014 Commonwealth Games in Scotland. After changing allegiances to represent Great Britain and England, he won a silver medal at the 2017 European Championships.

He won a bronze medal at the 2018 Commonwealth Games in Australia and also won bronze at the 2019 European Games in Minsk, Belarus.

Clarke competed at the 2019 World Championships in Yekaterinburg, Russia and the delayed Tokyo 2020 Summer Olympics but failed to win a medal at either event.

== Professional career ==
Clarke turned professional in January 2022, signing a promotional deal with Eddie Hearn's Matchroom Boxing and made his pro-debut on 27 February that year knocking out Croatia's Toni Visic in round two at The O2 Arena in London, England.

On 27 January 2024, he won his first professional title, claiming the vacant WBA cruiserweight Intercontinental belt with a fourth-round stoppage of Tommy McCarthy at Ulster Hall, Belfast, Northern Ireland.

In his next fight, Clarke won the vacant British cruiserweight title by knocking out Ellis Zorro in round eight of their contest at the First Direct Arena in Leeds, England, on 25 May 2024.

Defending the WBA Intercontinental title, Clarke defeated Efetobor Apochi by majority decision at Dignity Health Sports Park, Carson, California, on 31 August 2024, with two ringside judges scoring the fight in his favour 98–92 and 97–93 respectively while the third had it a 95–95 draw.

Clarke fought unbeaten French boxer Leonardo Mosquea for the vacant European cruiserweight title in Monte Carlo on 14 December 2024, suffering his first loss as a professional by split decision with one judge scoring in his favour 117–113 but being overruled by the other two who had the bout 116–112 and 115–112 respectively for his opponent.

Clarke defended his British title against English cruiserweight champion Viddal Riley on the undercard of Chris Eubank Jr vs Conor Benn on 26 April 2025 at the Tottenham Hotspur Stadium. He chose to walk out to "North London Forever", the anthem of Tottenham's North London derby rivals, Arsenal. He lost by unanimous decision.

On 13 December 2025, Clarke got back to winning ways with a retirement victory over Anthony Hollaway at Adventist Health Arena in Stockton, California, USA. His opponent collapsed in his corner at the end of the fourth of their scheduled eight-round contest and was stretchered out of the ring, although he recovered sufficiently to pose for a photograph with Clarke later that day.

Clarke faced Jack Massey at Bournemouth International Centre on 6 June 2026. This was his Zuffa Boxing debut. He was sent to the canvas twice during the fourth round but recovered to deliver a knockdown of his own in round seven, after which the referee halted the bout and awarded him a technical knockout win.

On 25 September 2026, Zuffa Boxing announced a show to take place in London at the Copper Box Arena on 7 November. It was reported that Clarke would fight former world champion Chris Billam-Smith (22–2, 14 KOs) in a 12-round contest in the main event. He won by technical knockout in round seven.

== Professional boxing record ==
15 fights	13 wins	2 losses
By knockout	10	0
By decision	3	2

No.	Result	Record	Opponent	Type	Round, time	Date	Location	Notes
15	Win	13–2	Chris Billam-Smith	TKO	7 (10), 1:24	7 Nov 2026	Copper Box Arena, London, England	
14	Win	12–2	Jack Massey	TKO	7 (10), 1:24	6 Jun 2026	Bournemouth International Centre, Bournemouth, England	
13	Win	11–2	Anthony Hollaway	RTD	4 (8), 3:00	13 Dec 2025	Adventist Health Arena, Stockton, California, US	
12	Loss	10–2	Viddal Riley	UD	12	26 Apr 2025	Tottenham Hotspur Stadium, London, England	Lost British cruiserweight title
11	Loss	10–1	Leonardo Mosquea	SD	12	14 Dec 2024	Salle des Étoiles, Monte Carlo, Monaco	
10	Win	10–0	Efetobor Apochi	MD	10	31 Aug 2024	Dignity Health Sports Park, Carson, California, US	Retained WBA Inter-Continental cruiserweight title
9	Win	9–0	Ellis Zorro	KO	8 (12), 2:59	25 May 2024	First Direct Arena, Leeds, England	Won vacant British cruiserweight title
8	Win	8–0	Tommy McCarthy	TKO	4 (10), 1:28	27 Jan 2024	Ulster Hall, Belfast, Northern Ireland	Won vacant WBA Inter-Continental cruiserweight title
7	Win	7–0	Vasil Ducar	UD	10	30 Sep 2023	Wembley Arena, London, England	
6	Win	6–0	David Jamieson	TKO	5 (10), 0:35	10 Jun 2023	Wembley Arena, London, England	
5	Win	5–0	Israel Duffus	UD	10	18 Feb 2023	Nottingham Arena, Nottingham, England	
4	Win	4–0	Jose Gregorio Ulrich	TKO	2 (6), 0:32	26 Nov 2022	Wembley Arena, London, England	
3	Win	3–0	Marcos Nicolas Karalitzky	TKO	4 (6), 2:21	24 Sep 2022	Nottingham Arena, Nottingham, England	
2	Win	2–0	Pawel Martyniuk	TKO	3 (6), 1:10	21 May 2022	The O2 Arena, London, England	
1	Win	1–0	Toni Visić	KO	2 (6), 2:01	27 Feb 2022	The O2 Arena, London, England	
