= Shawn Miller (boxer) =

American boxer (born 1982)

- Born: Shawn Michael Miller; March 23, 1982 (age 44); Troy, New York, U.S.

Shawn Michael Miller (born March 23, 1982) is an American professional boxer. As an amateur, he went undefeated with a perfect record of 23-0.

== Background ==
The Miller family has been in the boxing business for several generations. Miller's brother, Shannon Miller, is a retired professional heavyweight boxer who fought for many years. Shannon's record was 16-4, with 9 wins by knockout. Their father, Bob Miller, was a boxer until age 21, after which he went on to train other fighters, and promote for several big names in the sport. Together with his wife, Bob Miller promoted fights for Verno Philips, Lucian Bute, and even Mike Tyson.

== Early years ==
Miller had his first match at age 11. He attended Troy High School, where he was an all-state performer in football, basketball, and baseball. He played football and baseball at Hudson Valley Community College, earning Northeast Football Conference Offensive Player of the Year honors in 2001 after recording 41 receptions for 611 yards and nine touchdowns. From there, he played two games for the University at Albany football team before injuring his knee. He finally transferred to the West Virginia University, where he played both football and baseball. He injured his elbow during a pre-draft workout, derailing his professional baseball career. Instead, Miller played professional arena football for three years with the Albany Conquest.

== Professional career ==
Miller started his professional boxing career in 2009.
