= Carlos Ocampo =

Mexican boxer (born 1995)

Personal information
- Nickname: Chema
- Born: Carlos Cesar Ocampo Manriquez; 9 November 1995 (age 31) Ensenada, Baja California, Mexico
- Height: 5 ft 10 1/2 in (179 cm)
- Weight: Welterweight; Super-welterweight

Boxing career
- Reach: 73 in (185 cm)
- Stance: Orthodox

Boxing record
- Total fights: 43
- Wins: 39
- Win by KO: 27
- Losses: 4

Carlos Cesar Ocampo Manriquez (born 9 November 1995) is a Mexican professional boxer. He challenged for the IBF welterweight title in 2018.

== Amateur career ==
As an amateur, Ocampo won silver medals in the 2009 and 2011 Mexican National Olympiads.

== Professional career ==
Ocampo won his first 21 professional bouts, becoming mandatory challenger to IBF welterweight champion Errol Spence Jr., who he faced at Ford Center at The Star in Frisco, Texas, USA, on 16 June 2018, losing by knockout in the first round.

ON 8 October 2022, he fought Sebastian Fundora for the WBC interim super-welterweight title at Dignity Health Sports Park in Carson, California, USA, but lost via unanimous decision.

Ocampo took on Tim Tszyu for the WBO interim super-welterweight title at Gold Coast Convention Centre on the Gold Coast, Australia, on 18 June 2023, suffering a first-round knockout defeat.

He faced Callum Walsh at the Meta Apex in Enterprise, Nevada, USA, on 23 January 2026. Despite scoring a flash knockdown in the sixth round, Ocampo lost the 10-round bout via unanimous decision.

On 29 August 2026, he defeated the previously unbeaten Weljon Mindoro by ninth-round technical knockout at the USC Galen Center in Los Angeles, California, USA.

== Professional boxing record ==
43 fights	39 wins	4 losses
By knockout	27	2
By decision	12	2

No.	Result	Record	Opponent	Type	Round, time	Date	Location	Notes
43	Win	39–4	Weljon Mindoro	TKO	9 (10), 1:59	29 Aug 2026	USC Galen Center, Los Angeles, California, U.S.	
42	Loss	38–4	Callum Walsh	UD	10	23 Jan 2026	Meta Apex, Enterprise, Nevada, U.S.	
41	Win	38–3	Ricardo Banuelos Cernas	KO	3 (8), 0:29	25 Oct 2025	Hermosillo, Sonora, Mexico	
40	Win	37–3	Luis Enrique Montelongo Morales	TKO	2 (8), 0:10	22 Feb 2025	Auditorio Municipal, Tijuana, Mexico	
39	Win	36–3	Eduardo Alfonso Moguel Capito	TKO	1 (8), 1:01	25 Jan 2025	San Luis Potosi, Mexico	
38	Loss	35–3	Tim Tszyu	KO	1 (12), 1:17	18 Jun 2023	Gold Coast Convention Centre, Gold Coast, Australia	For WBO interim super welterweight title
37	Win	35–2	Mauricio Gutierrez Castor	TKO	5 (10)	25 Mar 2023	Guadalajara, Mexico	
36	Loss	34–2	Sebastian Fundora	UD	12	8 Oct 2022	Dignity Health Sports Park, Carson, California, U.S.	For WBC interim super welterweight title
35	Win	34–1	Vicente Martín Rodríguez	KO	1 (8), 2:06	11 Jun 2022	Honda Center, Anaheim, California, U.S.	
34	Win	33–1	Mikaël Zewski	TKO	9 (10), 1:49	25 Mar 2022	Colisée, Trois-Rivières, Canada	
33	Win	32–1	Omir Rodriguez	KO	1 (10), 2:59	15 Jan 2022	La Casa de los Zonkeys, Tijuana, Mexico	
32	Win	31–1	Luis Enrique Montelongo	UD	10	17 Jul 2021	Gimnasio TV Azteca, Mexico City, Mexico	
31	Win	30–1	Ivan Matute	KO	2 (10), 1:52	10 Apr 2021	Grand Hotel, Tijuana, Mexico	
30	Win	29–1	Abraham Juarez Ramirez	TKO	1 (10), 1:19	16 Jan 2021	Grand Hotel, Tijuana, Mexico	
29	Win	28–1	Jorge Garcia Perez	UD	10	15 Aug 2020	Gimnasio TV Azteca, Mexico City, Mexico	
28	Win	27–1	Adolfo Mauricio Moreschi	RTD	4 (8), 3:00	14 Dec 2019	Gimnasio Oscar 'Tigre' García, Ensenada, Mexico	
27	Win	26–1	Adrian Perez	TKO	5 (10), 1:55	19 Oct 2019	La Casa de los Zonkeys, Tijuana, Mexico	
26	Win	25–1	Jesus Perez	TKO	4 (10), 2:47	31 Aug 2019	Arena La Paz, La Paz, Mexico	
25	Win	24–1	David Bustamante	UD	4	6 Apr 2019	Arena Sonora, Hermosillo, Mexico	
24	Win	23–1	Jesus Antonio Rojas	KO	3 (10), 2:14	18 Aug 2018	Club Britania, Chihuahua City, Mexico	
23	Loss	22–1	Errol Spence Jr.	KO	1 (12), 3:00	16 Jun 2018	Ford Center at The Star, Frisco, Texas, U.S.	For IBF welterweight title
22	Win	22–0	Dario Ferman	TKO	7 (10), 0:15	11 Nov 2017	Gimnasio Rodrigo M. Quevedo, Chihuahua City, Mexico	
21	Win	21–0	Daniel Echeverria	UD	10	14 Jan 2017	Gimnasio Municipal Gustavo Díaz Ordaz, Tecate, Mexico	
20	Win	20–0	Alvaro Robles	UD	10	20 Aug 2016	La Cetto Vineyard, Valle de Guadalupe, Mexico	
19	Win	19–0	Ramses Agaton	UD	10	18 Jun 2016	Auditorio Municipal Fausto Gutiérrez Moreno, Tijuana, Mexico	
18	Win	18–0	Charlie Navarro	KO	5 (10), 0:37	6 Feb 2016	Gimnasio El Maneadero, Ensenada, Mexico	
17	Win	17–0	Jorge Páez Jr.	UD	10	28 Nov 2015	Arena Tequisquiapan, Tequisquiapan, Mexico	
16	Win	16–0	Jhony Navarrete	UD	10	8 Aug 2015	Campos Deportivos de la Casa Social Cerveceria Tecate, Tecate, Mexico	
15	Win	15–0	Cruz Antonio Flores	TKO	4 (10), 0:31	30 May 2015	Campo Nuevo Ensenada, Ensenada, Mexico	
14	Win	14–0	Uriel Gonzalez	KO	2 (8), 1:47	28 Feb 2015	Centro De Convenciones, Rosarito Beach, Mexico	
13	Win	13–0	Victor Fonseca	UD	10	7 Nov 2014	Gimnasio Oscar 'Tigre' García, Ensenada, Mexico	
12	Win	12–0	Javier Carrera	TKO	5 (10), 2:52	29 Aug 2014	Gimnasio Oscar 'Tigre' García, Ensenada, Mexico	
11	Win	11–0	Jose Luis Vazquez Tapia	KO	5 (6)	10 Feb 2014	Gimnasio Oscar 'Tigre' García, Ensenada, Mexico	
10	Win	10–0	Enrique Soto	TKO	3 (6), 2:31	11 Jan 2014	Casino Hipodromo Agua Caliente, Tijuana, Mexico	
9	Win	9–0	Cesar Sanchez	KO	1 (6), 2:21	22 Nov 2013	Forum Tecate, Tijuana, Mexico	
8	Win	8–0	Ciro Arellanes	UD	6	27 Sep 2013	Hipódromo Caliente, Arena Tecate, Tijuana, Mexico	
7	Win	7–0	Engelberto Valenzuela	KO	1 (6), 0:36	23 Aug 2013	Gimnasio Oscar 'Tigre' García, Ensenada, Mexico	
6	Win	6–0	Cesar Sanchez	TKO	2 (6), 1:10	3 Aug 2013	Hipódromo Caliente, Arena Tecate, Tijuana, Mexico	
5	Win	5–0	Roberto Ramirez	SD	6	13 Jul 2013	Forum Tecate, Tijuana, Mexico	
4	Win	4–0	Rodolfo Manriquez	KO	3 (4), 0:10	14 Jun 2013	Casino Hipodromo Agua Caliente, Tijuana, Mexico	
3	Win	3–0	Angel Verdiales	KO	3 (4)	12 Apr 2013	Gimnasio Oscar 'Tigre' García, Ensenada, Mexico	
2	Win	2–0	Pedro Garcia	KO	3 (4), 2:16	20 Sep 2012	Salon Las Pulgas, Tijuana, Mexico	
1	Win	1–0	Alberto Tuen	UD	4	27 Jul 2012	Gimnasio Oscar 'Tigre' García, Ensenada, Mexico	

Sporting positions
Vacant Title last held by Brandon Adams	WBC Continental Americas light middleweight champion March 25 – October 8, 2022; Lost bid for interim world title	Vacant Title last held by Serhii Bohachuk
