= Sydney Forks =

Community in Nova Scotia, Canada

Coordinates: 46°4′9.91″N 60°16′52.66″W

Sydney Forks in Nova Scotia

Sydney Forks is a community in the Canadian province of Nova Scotia, located in the Cape Breton Regional Municipality on Cape Breton Island.
