= Serhii Bohachuk =

Ukrainian boxer (born 1995)

Serhii Bohachuk Сергій Богачук
Personal information
- Nickname: El Flaco ("The Skinny")
- Nationality: Ukrainian
- Born: Serhii Vasylovych Bohachuk; 24 April 1995 (age 31) Vinnytsia, Ukraine
- Height: 6 ft 0 in (183 cm)
- Weight: Light middleweight; Middleweight

Boxing career
- Reach: 73 in (185 cm)
- Stance: Orthodox

Boxing record
- Total fights: 31
- Wins: 27
- Win by KO: 24
- Losses: 4

Serhii Vasylovych Bohachuk (Ukrainian: Сергій Васильович Богачук; born 24 April 1995) is a Ukrainian professional boxer who competes in the super welterweight and middleweight divisions. He is a Master of Sports of Ukraine, was a silver medalist of the Ukrainian Championship (2015), three-time champion of Ukraine among youth and under 22 years old, and a multiple winner and prize-winner of national and international amateur tournaments.

== Professional career ==
After competing for the Ukraine Otamans in the World Series of Boxing in 2016, Bohachuk made his professional debut on 3 February 2017, scoring a second-round knockout (KO) victory over Matt Murphy at the Jonathan Club in Los Angeles, California.

After compiling a record of 15–0 (15 KOs) he faced Tyrone Brunson for the vacant WBC Continental Americas super-welterweight title on 27 October 2019 at The Avalon in Los Angeles, California. Bohachuk knocked Brunson to the canvas on three occasions, once in the third round and twice in the fourth, with the third knockdown signaling the end of the fight, giving Bohachuk his sixteenth consecutive stoppage win with a fourth-round KO.

Bohachuk would suffer his first loss against Brandon Adams in March 2021. Being stopped in the eighth round.

=== Bohachuk vs. Ortiz Jr ===
On 24 June 2024 it was announced that Bohachuk would face Vergil Ortiz Jr. in Las Vegas on 10 August 2024. Ortiz would go on to beat Serhii via a majority decision, costing him his title.

=== Bohachuk vs. Davis ===
Bohachuk was scheduled to face Israil Madrimov on the Oleksandr Usyk vs. Tyson Fury II undercard at Kingdom Arena in Riyadh, Saudi Arabia on 21 December 2024. On 7 December 2024 it was announced that Madrimov withdrew due to bronchitis. It was later announced that Madrimov was replaced by Ishmael Davis. Bohachuk knocked Davis to the canvas in the second round and won when his opponent retired at the end of the sixth round.

=== Bohachuk vs. Adams ===
Bohachuk faced Brandon Adams in a rematch at Allegiant Stadium, Paradise, Nevada, on 13 September 2025. He lost by unanimous decision.

=== Bohachuk vs. Butaev ===
Bohachuk got back to winning ways with a split decision success over Radzhab Butaev at Meta Apex in Enterprise, Nevada, USA, on 1 February 2026.

=== Bohachuk vs. Mosley Jr. ===
In his second successive fight at the Meta Apex, Bohachuk lost by sixth round technical knockout to Shane Mosley Jr. on 10 May 2026.

== Professional boxing record ==
31 fights	27 wins	4 losses
By knockout	24	2
By decision	3	2

No.	Result	Record	Opponent	Type	Round, time	Date	Location	Notes
31	Loss	27–4	Shane Mosley Jr.	TKO	6 (10), 2:38	10 May 2026	Meta Apex, Enterprise, Nevada, U.S.	
30	Win	27–3	Radzhab Butaev	SD	10	1 Feb 2026	Meta Apex, Enterprise, Nevada, U.S.	
29	Loss	26–3	Brandon Adams	UD	10	13 Sep 2025	Allegiant Stadium, Paradise, Nevada, U.S.	
28	Win	26–2	Mykal Fox	UD	10	17 May 2025	Commerce Casino, Commerce, California, U.S.	
27	Win	25–2	Ishmael Davis	RTD	6 (12), 3:00	21 Dec 2024	Kingdom Arena, Riyadh, Saudi Arabia	
26	Loss	24–2	Vergil Ortiz Jr.	MD	12	10 Aug 2024	Michelob Ultra Arena, Paradise, Nevada, U.S.	Lost interim WBC light middleweight title
25	Win	24–1	Brian Mendoza	UD	12	30 Mar 2024	T-Mobile Arena, Paradise, Nevada, U.S.	Won vacant interim WBC light middleweight title
24	Win	23–1	Patrick Allotey	KO	1 (10), 2:32	22 Jul 2023	Chumash Casino Resort, Santa Ynez, California, U.S.	Retained WBC Continental Americas light middleweight title
23	Win	22–1	Nathaniel Gallimore	KO	6 (10), 2:58	27 Jan 2023	Quiet Cannon, Montebello, California, U.S.	Retained WBC Continental Americas light middleweight title
22	Win	21–1	Aaron Coley	KO	2 (10), 1:54	3 Nov 2022	Quiet Cannon, Montebello, California, U.S.	Won vacant WBC Continental Americas light middleweight title
21	Win	20–1	Raphael Igbokwe	TKO	6 (10), 2:58	16 Sep 2021	Quiet Cannon, Montebello, California, U.S.	
20	Win	19–1	Brandon Baue	KO	1 (8), 2:11	17 Jul 2021	Forster Community Center, Rock Rapids, Iowa, U.S.	
19	Loss	18–1	Brandon Adams	TKO	8 (10), 2:47	4 Mar 2021	Municipal Boxing Gym Felix Pagan Pintor, Guaynabo, Puerto Rico	Lost WBC Continental Americas light middleweight title
18	Win	18–0	Alejandro Davila	RTD	6 (10), 3:00	25 Sep 2020	Grupo SIPSE, Merida, Yucatán, Mexico	Retained WBC Continental Americas light middleweight title
17	Win	17–0	Carlos Galvan	KO	5 (8), 1:40	13 Dec 2019	Fantasy Springs Resort Casino, Indio, California, U.S.	
16	Win	16–0	Tyrone Brunson	KO	4 (10), 2:50	27 Oct 2019	The Avalon, Hollywood, California, U.S.	Won vacant WBC Continental Americas light middleweight title
15	Win	15–0	Fernando Marin	KO	3 (10), 1:25	28 Jul 2019	The Avalon, Hollywood, California, U.S.	
14	Win	14–0	Freddy Hernández	KO	5 (8), 1:40	19 May 2019	The Avalon, Hollywood, California, U.S.	
13	Win	13–0	Cleotis Pendarvis	RTD	3 (8), 3:00	24 Mar 2019	The Avalon, Hollywood, California, U.S.	
12	Win	12–0	Carlos Hernandez	KO	5 (6), 1:22	8 Dec 2018	StubHub Center, Carson, California, U.S.	
11	Win	11–0	Ronald Montes	KO	1 (6), 1:50	30 Oct 2018	The Avalon, Hollywood, California, U.S.	
10	Win	10–0	Nikolozi Gviniashvili	RTD	5 (8), 3:00	21 Jul 2018	Olympic Stadium, Moscow, Russia	
9	Win	9–0	Cesar Berumen	KO	2 (6), 1:56	6 Jun 2018	The Avalon, Hollywood, California, U.S.	
8	Win	8–0	Todd Manuel	TKO	4 (6), 0:44	26 Apr 2018	Hotel Irvine, Irvine, California, U.S.	
7	Win	7–0	Lucius Johnson	TKO	3 (6), 2:47	27 Mar 2018	The Avalon, Hollywood, California, U.S.	
6	Win	6–0	Kevin Ottley	KO	5 (6), 0:52	7 Dec 2017	The Hangar, Costa Mesa, California, U.S.	
5	Win	5–0	Joan Valenzuela	TKO	2 (4), 1:58	16 Sep 2017	T-Mobile Arena, Paradise, Nevada, U.S.	
4	Win	4–0	Jonathan Perez	KO	2 (4), 2:10	6 Apr 2017	The Hangar, Costa Mesa, California, U.S.	
3	Win	3–0	Yasmani Pedroso	TKO	3 (4), 2:28	18 Mar 2017	Madison Square Garden, New York City, New York, U.S.	
2	Win	2–0	César Aguilera	KO	1 (4), 2:37	24 Feb 2017	Sportsmen's Lodge, Los Angeles, California, U.S.	
1	Win	1–0	Matt Murphy	KO	2 (4), 2:14	3 Feb 2017	Jonathan Club, Los Angeles, California, U.S.	

== See also ==
- List of male boxers

Sporting positions
Regional boxing titles
Vacant Title last held by Patrick Day	WBC Continental Americas light-middleweight champion 27 October 2019 – 4 March 2021	Succeeded by Brandon Adams
Vacant Title last held by Carlos Ocampo	WBC Continental Americas light-middleweight champion 3 November 2022 – February, 2024; Vacated	Vacant Title next held by Callum Walsh
World boxing titles
Vacant Title last held by Brian Mendoza	WBC light-middleweight champion Interim title 30 March 2024 – 10 August 2024	Succeeded by Vergil Ortiz Jr.
