= Jevgenijs Aleksejevs =

Latvian boxer (born 1993)

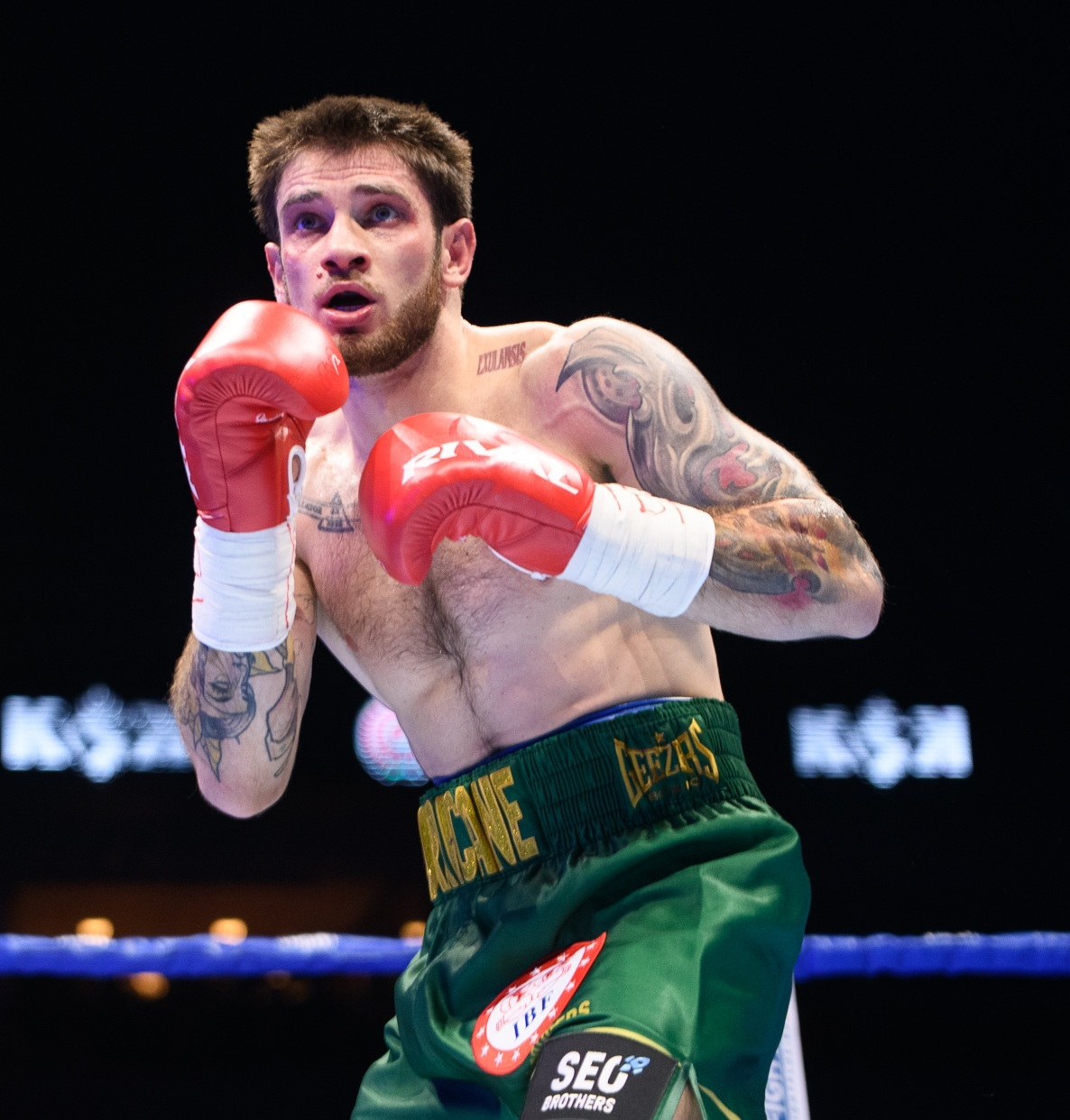

Personal information
- Nickname: The Hurricane
- Nationality: Latvian
- Born: 6 July 1993 (age 33)
- Height: 6 ft 0 in / 183 cm

Boxing career
- Weight class: Middleweight
- Reach: 72" / 183 cm
- Stance: Orthodox

Boxing record
- Total fights: 19
- Wins: 19
- Win by KO: 10
- Losses: 0
- Draws: 0

Jevgenijs Aleksejevs (born 6 July 1993) is a Latvian professional boxer and former kickboxer. He fights in the middleweight division and is undefeated after 19 fights.

== Early life and amateur career ==
He began his combat career in kickboxing, where he won several titles. Aleksejevs was the European Kickboxing Champion in 2008 and the Baltic K-1 Champion 2010, but a serious leg fracture forced him to change to boxing.

== Professional career ==
After overcoming his leg fracture, Aleksejevs began training to become a professional boxer and made his debut in 2013, beating compatriot Mareks Kovalevskis by knockout in the first round.

He has also beaten Latvian Valērijs Mikalauskas, Frenchman Maurice Possiti, Argentinian Nicolas "Mazazo" Veron, and experienced Estonian fighter Pavel Semjonov.

Aleksejevs is known for his counterpunching ability and has been recognized for his fast hands and technical skills. He often dominates his opponents in mid-to-later rounds and has been tipped as one of the fastest rising stars in European boxing.

Jevgenijs Aleksejevs serves as an ambassador for the IT company SEOBROTHERS.

=== Aleksejevs vs. Abdulaev ===
On 28 September 2024, Aleksejevs fought former UBF European middleweight champion Misto Abdulaev for the vacant IBO European middleweight title and won by TKO in the second round.

=== Aleksejevs vs. Seck ===
On 3 May 2025, Aleksejevs defeated former IBO Continental middleweight champion and IBF International middleweight contender Ismaël Seck by UD in ten rounds.

=== Aleksejevs vs. Zyśk ===
On 11 October 2025, Aleksejevs claimed the vacant IBF Europe Middleweight title by defeating the former IBO World Super Welter contender Przemysław Zyśk by UD in ten rounds.

== Professional boxing record ==
Aleksejevs boasts a clean slate in his 19 bouts so far.

No	Result	Record	Opponent	Round Time	Date	Location	Notes
19	Win (UD)	19-0	Przemysław Zyśk		11 Oct 2025	Xiaomi Arena, Riga	Fight for the vacant IBF Europe Middleweight title, KOK 127 World Series
18	Win (UD)	18-0	Ismaël Seck		3 May 2025	Millenium Event Center, Braunschweig	AAA Fighting Series 5
17	Win (TKO)	17-0	Misto Abdulaev	2 (10) 2:25	28 Sep 2024	Poliesportiu Municipal, Canals	Won vacant IBO European middleweight title
16	Win (TKO)	16-0	Marcelo German Rodriguez	4 (8) 0:25	20 Apr 2024	L'Alqueria del Basket, Valencia	
15	Win (UD)	15-0	Nicolas David Veron		22 Dec 2023	Pabellon Municipal, Sedavi	
14	Win (TKO)	14-0	Dimitri Trenel	3 (6) 2:05	5 Aug 2023	Hotel Holiday World, Benalmadena	
13	Win (UD)	13-0	Pavel Semjonov		16 Oct 2021	Arena Riga, Riga	
12	Win (KO)	12-0	Deniss Kormilin	1 (6) 2:29	29 Aug 2019	Studio 69, Riga	
11	Win (SD)	11-0	Sergey Khomitsky		15 Jun 2019	Arena Riga, Riga	
10	Win (UD)	10-0	Przemyslaw Gorgon		6 Oct 2018	Arena Riga, Riga	
9	Win (UD)	9-0	Gabriel Lecrosnier		12 May 2018	Arena Riga, Riga	
8	Win (SD)	8-0	Maurice Possiti		27 Jan 2018	Arena Riga, Riga	
7	Win (TKO)	7-0	Slobodan Culum	1 (6) 1:18	11 Nov 2017	Arena Riga, Riga	
6	Win (KO)	6-0	Andrey Chentsov	3 (6) 2:13	30 Sep 2017	Arena Riga, Riga	
5	Win (UD)	5-0	Valerijs Mikalausks		22 Apr 2017	Olympic Sports Centre, Riga	
4	Win (TKO)	4-0	Jurijs Kozlovs	1 (4) 1:50	14 May 2016	Arena Riga, Riga	
3	Win (TKO)	3-0	Nikita Mateuss	1 (4) 1:03	21 Feb 2016	Arena Riga, Riga	
2	Win (TKO)	2-0	Dmitrijs Savenko	1 (4) 1:56	1 Apr 2014	Club Rigas Rings, Riga	
1	Win (KO)	1-0	Mareks Kovalevskis	2 (4) 1:46	28 Sep 2013	Club Rigas Rings, Riga	
