= List of Zuffa Boxing world champions =

This is a list of Zuffa Boxing champions, showing every champion recognized by Zuffa Boxing since 2026.

== Background ==
In February 2026, Zuffa Boxing co-founder Dana White announced that the inaugural Zuffa title would be contested between Jai Opetaia and Brandon Glanton on March 8, 2026. Unlike the current major sanctioning bodies WBA, WBC, IBF and WBO, Zuffa Boxing will only recognize 8 of the 17 weight divisions. The design of the belt was unveiled on March 5, 2026. On March 8, 2026, following his win over Glanton, Opetaia would become the inaugural cruiserweight champion.

== Heavyweight ==
No.	Name	Duration of reign	Defenses
not inaugurated

== Cruiserweight ==
No.	Name	Duration of reign	Defenses
1	(Australia) Jai Opetaia	Mar 8, 2026 – present	1

== Light heavyweight ==
No.	Name	Duration of reign	Defenses
not inaugurated

== Middleweight ==
No.	Name	Duration of reign	Defenses
1	(Republic of Ireland) Aaron McKenna	August 8, 2026 - present	0

== Welterweight ==
No.	Name	Duration of reign	Defenses
not inaugurated

== Lightweight ==
No.	Name	Duration of reign	Defenses
not inaugurated

== Featherweight ==
No.	Name	Duration of reign	Defenses
not inaugurated

== Bantamweight ==
No.	Name	Duration of reign	Defenses
not inaugurated

== See also ==
- List of WBA world champions
- List of WBC world champions
- List of IBF world champions
- List of WBO world champions
- List of IBO world champions
- List of The Ring world champions
