= Liam Smith vs. Chris Eubank Jr II =

Boxing match

Repeat or Revenge
- Date: 2 September 2023
- Venue: Manchester Arena, Manchester, UK

Tale of the tape
| Boxer | Liam Smith | Chris Eubank Jr |
| Nickname | Beefy | Next Gen |
| Hometown | Liverpool, Merseyside | Hove, East Sussex |
| Pre-fight record | 33–3–1 (20 KOs) | 32–3 (23 KOs) |
| Age | 35 years, 1 month | 33 years, 11 months |
| Height | 5 ft 9 1/2 in (177 cm) | 5 ft 11 in (180 cm) |
| Weight | 160 lb (73 kg) | 159.3 lb (72 kg) |
| Style | Orthodox | Orthodox |
| Recognition | WBO; No. 2 Ranked Middleweight; WBA; No. 4 Ranked Light Middleweight | WBC; No. 5 Ranked Middleweight; WBO; No. 11 Ranked Middleweight |

Result
- Eubank Jr wins via 10th-round TKO

Liam Smith vs Chris Eubank Jr II, billed as Repeat or Revenge, was a professional boxing match contested on 2 September 2023.

== Background ==
On 14 February 2023, three weeks after his upset loss to Liam Smith, Chris Eubank Jr activated the rematch clause in the contract. On 25 April, the rematch was formally announced to take place on 17 June at the AO Arena in Manchester on Sky Sports Box Office in the UK and ESPN+ in the US. On the rematch being signed, Eubank said, “Liam had the night of his life against me in January, the stars aligned for him in Manchester, and he went away with a big win. But lightning doesn’t strike twice. If he even has the slightest thought that he can beat me again, then great, because it will be his undoing.” Smith said, “I know he tried his best to go a different route but the fight is on now and I am looking forward to hearing what he has to say for himself in the build up. Let’s see what angle he comes with this time. He can’t come with angles about how he’s never been hurt, he’s never been dropped, he’s never been stopped, because he just had all three of those things happen to him in one night and it was me who did it to him. I’m also interested to see where he goes after I beat him again on June 17th.” The fight was promoted by Boxxer, in association with Wasserman Boxing.

Ben Shalom credited Eubank on taking the rematch, after not being for it originally. He felt Eubank had more to lose in the rematch and a further loss would be detrimental to his career. After Eubank activated the rematch clause, he engaged in negotiations for a bout with Conor Benn, which was proposed to occur in Abu Dhabi this June, right up until the official announcement of the fight. Eubank explained, “I decided against it (taking the Benn fight). It was a substantial offer. I had to weigh out the pros and cons of taking that fight before taking the Smith fight, because the Smith fight was always going to happen. I have to avenge the loss. I eventually decided against fighting Benn next." He also expressed a preference for the bout against Benn to be held in the UK. On 8 May, reports emerged indicating that Smith sustained a minor back injury during training camp, resulting in the postponement of the fight. The following day, the match was promptly rescheduled for 1 July 2023. On 24 May, the fight was postponed again after Smith cited persistent injuries that impacted his training camp. By July, Smith was fully fit again and the fight was again rescheduled for 2 September 2023.

In August, Roy Jones Jr, who had been training Eubank for his recent bouts, announced that he would not be in his corner for the upcoming rematch. The primary reason for his absence is his commitment to other boxers who have scheduled fights. Eubank enlisted Brian "Bomac" McIntyre as his trainer for the upcoming rematch. McIntyre was recognized for his successful experience in coaching multi-weight world champion Terence Crawford. During fight week, Joseph McNally, trainer of Smith, disclosed that VADA testing did not occur for the rematch between Smith and Eubank. He specifically pointed out that Smith had not undergone any testing by the doping agency prior to the bout. Eubank weighed 159.3 pounds while Smith weighed on the 160 pounds limit.

== The fight ==
Eubank employed a punch-and-grab technique to gradually wear down Smith, dropping him twice which led to a stoppage in the tenth round, gaining revenge. Eubank sent Smith to the canvas with a powerful uppercut in the fourth round and put him in a tough spot in the fifth, unleashing a series of punches while Smith was cornered against the ropes. By the ninth round, Smith seemed visibly fatigued and appeared to be struggling with an injury to his right ankle. In the tenth round, Eubank sent Smith to the canvas once more before ultimately halting the fight just moments later with a flurry of unanswered blows. The bout was called off at 1:45 of round ten. Following the stoppage, a triumphant Eubank gazed into the crowd, directing his attention towards retired boxer Kell Brook, signalling his desire for a showdown with him in the near future. He also called out Conor Benn and Gennady Golovkin.

Smith attributed his physical condition to the significant weight loss he underwent in preparation for the rematch. However, he still praised Eubank stating, "I was flat from the start; the weight killed me after the injury. I was just flat from the get-go and Chris was sharp, that's all I can say about it really. Chris was the better man tonight, I shout when I win and I'll take my defeat when I lose." CompuBox stats shows that Eubank landed 193 of 580 punches thrown (33.3%), nearly six times more than Smith, who landed 33 of his 132 thrown (25%).

== Aftermath ==
Although there was nothing in the contracts to force a third fight, Smith was eager for a trilogy. He said, "This is obviously Chris' night. I had my night in January. I'm not taking nothing away from Chris this time round. This is his night. It's 1-1 now, so let's see what happens next. It's 1-1. That doesn't settle nothing for me." Eubank expressed that he would consider a third fight only if there was significant public interest. Prior to his fight against Benn, Eubank was presented with a bespoke jacket adorned with Smith's real blood. It was at this time also when Smith once again expressed interest in settling a trilogy with Eubank. Smith was scheduled to fight Aaron McKenna on the undercard. Smith lost via a lop-sided decision.

== Undercard ==
Confirmed bouts:

| Weight Class | | vs | | Method | Round | Time | Notes |
|---|---|---|---|---|---|---|---|
| Middleweight | (United Kingdom) Chris Eubank Jr | def. | (United Kingdom) Liam Smith | TKO | 10 (12) | 1:45 |
| Super Middleweight | (United Kingdom) Jack Cullen | def. | (United Kingdom) Mark Heffron | TKO | 3 (12) | 2:43 | ^{Note 1} |
| Super lightweight | (United Kingdom) Adam Azim | def. | (Ukraine) Aram Faniian | UD | 10 |
| Heavyweight | (United Kingdom) Frazer Clarke | def. | (United Kingdom) David Allen | RTD | 6 (10) | 3:00 |
| Welterweight | (Albania) Florian Marku | def. | (Republic of Ireland) Dylan Moran | TKO | 1 (10) | 0:54 |
| Cruiserweight | (United States) Mikaela Mayer | def. | (Italy) Silvia Bortot | PTS | 10 |
| Welterweight | (United Kingdom) Lauren Price | def. | (Zambia) Lolita Muzeya | TKO | 6 (8) | 0:24 |
| Lightweight | (United Kingdom) Frankie Stringer | def. | (Nicaragua) Engel Gomez | PTS | 4 |

^Note 1 For British and Commonwealth Super Middleweight titles

== Broadcasting ==
| Country | Broadcaster |
|---|---|
| United Kingdom | Sky Sports |

| Preceded by Rematch | Liam Smith's bouts 2 September 2023 | Succeeded by vs Aaron McKenna |
| Preceded by Rematch | Chris Eubank Jr's bouts 2 September 2023 | Succeeded by vs Kamil Szeremeta |
