= Adam Azim =

British boxer (born 2002)

Personal information
- Nickname: The Assassin
- Born: 21 July 2002 (age 24) Slough, England
- Height: 5 ft 11 in (180 cm)
- Weight: Light welterweight

Boxing career
- Stance: Orthodox

Boxing record
- Total fights: 15
- Wins: 15
- Win by KO: 12
- Losses: 0
- Draws: 0
- No contests: 0

Adam Azim (born 21 July 2002) is a British professional boxer who formally held the International Boxing Organization (IBO) super lightweight in 2025 before later vacating the title. He held the European super lightweight title from 2023 to 2024. As a youth amateur, he was ranked as number one in the world at welterweight.

== Early life ==
Azim was born to British Pakistani parents on 21 July 2002 in Slough, Berkshire, and grew up in Cippenham, with his family roots in Kotli, Azad Kashmir. He's one of seven siblings. His elder brother Hassan Azim is also a professional boxer. He belongs to a Rajput family of the Janjua clan.

Growing up, Azim was inspired by Amir Khan. He has ADHD and attended Eton Dorney School, Western House Academy, and Westgate School briefly, before enrolling in Al-Madani Independent Grammar School for the additional support.

== Amateur career ==
Before turning pro, Azim won ten national titles and was ranked the world's No.1 Youth Amateur at welterweight. Azim had an exceptional amateur career winning 10 national titles, one European Championship and a European silver medal. He also won every national title from schoolboys to youths, and was ranked the number one youth amateur in the world at welterweight.

== Professional career ==
=== Early career ===
Azim made his professional debut on 2 December 2020 against Ed Harrison. Azim won via wide points decision after winning every round on the referees scorecard. On 20 November 2021, Azim fought against Stu Greener. Towards the end of the opening round, Azim knocked his opponent down after landing a right hook. In the opening moments of the second round, Azim knocked Greener onto the canvas for a second time with another right hook. Following the second knockdown, the referee called an end to the bout.

Azim faced Jordan Ellison on 19 February 2022. In the opening round, Azim connected with a powerful right hand to the body which knocked his opponent down onto the canvas. Azim continued to control the bout and in the third round, he landed a heavy hand which knocked his opponent down for a second time. Following the second knockdown, the referee waved off the bout. On 26 March 2022, Azim fought Connor Marsden. Twelve seconds into the bout, Azim knocked his opponent down with a jab. Moments later, Azim dropped Marsden for a second time, after which the bout was called to an end.

Azim's fifth bout as a professional was against Anthony Loffet on 25 June 2022. Azim dropped his opponent with a right hook in the opening exchanges of the first round. Loffett was able to beat the count, however, Azim proceeded to connect with a number of right hooks which visibly hurt his opponent. Following this, Loffett's corner opted to throw in the towel to protect their fighter from further damage. On 3 September 2022, Azim faced Michel Cabral. In the opening round, Azim landed a powerful left hook to the body which visibly hurt his opponent. Azim followed this up with two heavy punches to the head which knocked Cabral onto the canvas. The bout was called to an end after Cabral was unable to beat the count.

In October 2022, it was announced that Azim would headline a "BOXXER: Breakthrough" card, scheduled to take place at Alexandra Palace in London against Rylan Charlton on Sunday 27 November 2022. This marked the first headline fight for Azim. The fight with Charlton was first discussed earlier in the year, with a proposed date in the Summer, however plans fell through. Charlton was considered a step up in competition. The card was billed as a Super Sunday event. The term usually used for Premier League football. The card aired during the afternoon. On 8 November, Azim pledged his future to BOXXER and Sky Sports by signing a new long-term contract. In a press release, BOXXER founder Ben Shalom described him as "one of the most exciting prospects on the planet". Azim, now 20 years old, had been endorsed by British Pakistani boxer Amir Khan, who believed Azim would beat his own record as the youngest world champion, which Khan achieved at 22 years old. Azim dropped Charlton three times on his way to a second round stoppage win. It only took 15 seconds to assert his dominance, making Charlton stumble, who then kept his guard up. Two left hooks followed by a right dropped Charlton. He beat the count, but was dropped again awkwardly after being hit with a left uppercut. The second round continued how the opening round ended with Azim dominating. A right hook dropped Charlton again. Referee Chas Coakley waived the fight off as Charlton's corner threw the towel in. During the post-fight, Azim said, “This is a big one. I knew I had him out of there in the first round. Shane told me to calm down and ‘let your shot come, you are going to definitely hurt him again’. I was really eager, but Shane told me to relax." During an interview backstage, Azim called for fights against Yuriorkis Gamboa and George Kambosos Jr. in 2023.

On 9 January 2023, it was announced by Boxxer that Azim would next fight Nicaraguan boxer Santos Reyes (12–0, 3 KOs). Although undefeated, Reyes had never fought outside of his native country. The card was scheduled to take place at Wembley Arena on 11 February 2023. On fight night, Azim dropped Reyes, but was forced to go the 10–round distance, ending his six-fight stoppage streak, winning a unanimous decision. It was a right hand in the second round, which heavily floored Reyes. The fight also marked the first time Azim was unable to stop an opponent that he knocked down. Azim praised him for his toughness. All three judges scored the fight 100–89 for Azim.

A month following the Reyes win, Boxxer and Sky Sports released a list of the next few events, with one of them being on 19 June, with Azim headlining at the York Hall in London. On 6 April, NoSmokeSport.com reported that Azim would be fighting Ukrainian boxer Aram Faniian (22–1, 4 KOs). Faniian was the IBO International champion and on a nine-fight win streak after losing in 2019. On 18 April, a press release officially announced fight. By May, the card was sold-out. During fight week, Azim was forced to pull out due to a sever hand infection. It was believed to have been caused several weeks prior during training when Azim cut his knuckles. The infection was in the dorsal hood. The card went ahead as planned. Azim expected Faniian to be his toughest fight since turning professional and wanted to fight him once he had recovered. In August 2023, the fight was rescheduled to take place on the Liam Smith vs. Chris Eubank Jr rematch on 2 September at the AO Arena in Manchester. Azim aimed to restart his stoppage streak. Despite being a step up, Faniian was not known for his punching power. Once again, Azim was taken the 10-round distance, winning via unanimous decision. The judges had it 98–92, 100–90 & 99–91 for Azim. Many of the rounds were close. In the later rounds, Azim got the better of the action with his work rate.

A month following the Reyes win, Boxxer and Sky Sports released a list of the next few events, with one of them being on 19 June, with Azim headlining at the York Hall in London. On 6 April, NoSmokeSport.com reported that Azim would be fighting Ukrainian boxer Aram Faniian (22–1, 4 KOs). Faniian was the IBO International champion and on a nine-fight win streak after losing in 2019. On 18 April, a press release officially announced fight. By May, the card was sold-out. During fight week, Azim was forced to pull out due to a sever hand infection. It was believed to have been caused several weeks prior during training when Azim cut his knuckles. The infection was in the dorsal hood. The card went ahead as planned. Azim expected Faniian to be his toughest fight since turning professional and wanted to fight him once he had recovered. In August 2023, the fight was rescheduled to take place on the Liam Smith vs. Chris Eubank Jr rematch on 2 September at the AO Arena in Manchester. Azim aimed to restart his stoppage streak. Despite being a step up, Faniian was not known for his punching power. Once again, Azim was taken the 10-round distance, winning via unanimous decision. The judges had it 98–92, 100–90, 99–91 for Azim. Many of the rounds were close. In the later rounds, Azim got the better of the action with his work rate. Azim was positive in the post-fight. “He was a good opponent. I'm only 21 and got into the ring with someone who's had 25 fights. No one would do that at this age. I just proved I can go 10 rounds, I can hurt him, I can stay on the inside and learn from my mistakes. I think it's a win-win." he told Sky Sports.

=== Rise up the ranks ===
Azim's next fight was scheduled to take place on 18 November 2023 against French boxer Franck Petitjean (24–6–3, 6 KOs) for the European super-lightweight championship at the Civil Hall in Wolverhampton. On the fight, he said, “I am so excited for this fight - fighting for the EBU title in just my tenth fight is massive for me. I’m ready to put on a show and bring that belt home with me on November 18th.” Petitjean was excited at the opportunity for fight at a big event and wanted to take give Azim a tough challenge. During the final press conference, Azim said, “I definitely want to make a massive statement. I don’t wanna be going out of that ring just winning the European title. I wanna win it by knockout.” Azim weighed 139.3 pounds and Petitjean came in at the 140-pound, despite looking drained. Azim stopped Petitjean in the tenth round to win the European title, and became the quickest British male boxer to win the title, beating Spencer Oliver's record of winning the bantamweight title in his eleventh fight in 1997. A left hook to the body dropped Petitjean in the fifth round. Petitjean struggled, but slowly beat the count. Azim remained in control and in the tenth, after a barrage of shots, Petitjean's corner threw in the towel.

In November 2023, it was reported that Azim would make his first defence against Danish mandatory challenger, Enock Poulsen (14–0, 5 KOs) on 3 February 2024. At this stage, no contracts had been signed, however Poulsen shared the information via social media. On 5 December, the fight was announced, to take place on the Joshua Buatsi vs. Dan Azeez undercard at The OVO Arena Wembley in London. Poulsen previously held the European title, also defeating Petitjean, but not able to defence the title. At this point in his career, Azim felt he was passed British level and wanted to work towards world level after the Poulsen fight. At the time, Dalton Smith held the British title. Azim defended his title with a fifth round stoppage. Azim won the first four rounds without any pressure. In the fifth, Poulsen suffered a shoulder problem, which was then checked out. Deemed unable to continue, the referee stopped the fight at 2:39 of the round.

On 7 February 2024, the EBU formally ordered Azim to defend his title against Dalton Smith. On 20 February, the BBBofC ordered Smith to make a mandatory defence against Azim. The EBU set purse bids for 28 February, however when the BBBofC ordered their fight, the date was pushed back to 3 April, to allow Azim to observe Ramadan, with an even 50–50 split. Many within the British boxing media felt despite the fight being ordered, it would not take place so soon. One of the major obstacles was Azim being contracted to Boxxer and Sky Sports and Smith contracted to Matchroom Boxing and DAZN. In March, his trainer Shane McGuigan spoke to reporters. The fight against Smith seemed distant as they wanted to continue fighting at a higher level. He revealed the team reached out to Harlem Eubank's team, however they wanted the fight at the welterweight limit, despite being deep into negotiations. On 23 March, after Smith defeated Jose Zepeda, Eddie Hearn 'dared' Azim to fight Smith.

On 3 April 2024, Azim vacated his European title, in favour of a fight with Harlem Eubank, which was back on the table. The fight with Eubank failed to happen. Azim was nursing some injuries to his wrist and ankles during the summer. On 5 September 2024, it was announced that Azim would headline at the Copper Box Arena in London against Ohara Davies (25–3, 18 KOs) on 19 October 2024. According to Azim, Eubank wanted to take a different path. Davies and Azim were both respectful towards each other as they had history, attending the Peacock Boxing Gym as amateurs. During the press conference, Davies instead taunted Ben Shalom and Shane McGuigan, until Azim stepped in, asking for mutual respect. A number of times during the build up, Davies stated this may be his retirement fight. For his third professional 12-round bout, Azim weighed 140 pounds and Davies came in at 139 pounds. Azim stopped Davies in the eighth round. Azim was boxing comfortably throughout the fight. By the fourth round, Azim began to gain more confidence in putting together some combinations. In round 5, he forced Davies to take a knee following a body shot. In round 8, a shot to the head put Davies down again and this time he was not able to beat the count.

On 2 December 2024, it was announced that Azim's next fight would take place at Wembley Arena in London on 1 February 2025 against 35 year old former world champion Sergey Lipinets (18–3–1, 13 KOs). The fight was announced the following day. Lipinets was grateful that Azim accepted the fight after claiming many boxers avoid fighting him. He was coming off a win against Robbie Davies in May 2024. At the press conference in January, Azim said he would put on “a sizzling performance” and retire Lipinets. However, during fight week, both boxers showed mutual respect towards each other. The vacant IBO super lightweight belt was on the line. At the weigh in, both Azim and Lipinets came in slightly overweight. Azim stepped on the scales and was 0.31lbs, equivalent to 5 ounces above the limit. Lipinets was a full pound over. They were given the standard two hours to lose the excess weight, in which they both did. Azim claimed the IBO belt with a ninth round TKO win over Lipinets. He became only the second boxer to stop Lipinets inside the distance. The fight was one-sided. A counter left to the body dropped Lipinets in the third round. In the next round, he was deducted a point for a low blow. Another point was taken off for another low blow, this time in the seventh. Azim then increased the pressure. Azim dominated the eighth round to the point were referee Steve Gray went to his corner after the round. The end came in the ninth after Azim landed multiple right uppercuts, forcing the stoppage after 33 seconds. Azim was questioned about the low blows. He said, "He (Lipinets) was really small and he was so hard from me to place the shot." The punched were unintentional. He then called out rival Dalton Smith. Prior to the win, Boxxer were looking to add Azim to the Eubank Jr.-Benn card in April at the Tottenham Hotspur Stadium.

The following month, Azim was named British Boxing Young Fighter of the Year. In March 2025, Azim stated that former world champions Regis Prograis and Richard Commey were among several opponents under consideration for his next bout, which was expected to take place in June 2025. Speaking to BoxingScene, Azim said he and his team would “sit down and discuss” a shortlist of “four or five names,” adding that “there’s a couple there.” Azim stated that he was seeking a high-profile opponent to further his development, describing Prograis as “a good name” and stating, “I’m looking for a good, former world champion, and a big profile.”

On 4 June 2025, Boxxer announced Azim would be added to the card on 7 June at Oakwell Stadium in Barnsley, headlined by local boxer Callum Simpson. Azim was brought in as a replacement due to light-heavyweight Mick Learmonth pulling out of the card due to injury. His opponent was revealed as Mexican boxer Eliot Chavez, who was little known in the UK, having been disqualified in his fight against prospect Harlem Eubank in 2022. Azim stated he was already training hard in the gym, in hopes of a big fight on the horizon and did not want to turn down the opportunity to fight at the Oakwell. The bout was cancelled just hours before it was set to take place after the British Boxing Board of Control revoked Chavez's permission to fight due to his use a sauna to make weight. In August 2025, amid uncertainty about which boxers would stay with Boxxer following their new television agreement with BBC, Azim's trainer Shane McGuigan announced that Azim had returned to training and that details of his next steps would be disclosed. McGuigan was not required to comment on Azim's contract situation.

On 11 September, it was announced that Azim had signed a new long-term promotional contract with Boxxer. A couple weeks later, his next fight was announced to take place at the Tottenham Hotspur Stadium in London on the Eubank-Benn II undercard on 15 November 2025 against Russian boxer Zaur Abdullaev. However, Abdullaev withdrew from the fight on 17 October, after he was unable to obtain a visa. A replacement was secured with American boxer Kurt Scoby (18–1, 16 KOs) stepping in on two weeks notice. Azim and Scoby came close to a physical confrontation during the public media workout in fight week, marking one of several exchanges throughout the week. Azim told DAZN, “He was just standing there saying, ‘I’m the bigger guy,’ so most of these guys aren’t going to do anything. I can’t wait to smash his face in on Saturday. I’m very calm but he’s a bit erratic... I’m going to punish him and take him into deep waters.” Azim won the fight via TKO in the twelfth round. The fight was mostly one-sided, with Azim effectively controlling the pace and utilizing a long jab. Scoby had difficulty engaging and only attempted to throw punches in the final moments. He did manage some success in the third round but was generally inconsistent, which allowed Azim to dominate the exchanges. In the later rounds, Azim increased his output, landing body shots and hooks. The ending came when Azim stunned Scoby against the ropes with a flurry of jabs, hooks, and straight rights that forced Scoby to take a knee. Scoby rose to his feet, but referee Howard Foster stopped the fight with a minute of the fight remaining. Azim landed 170 punches compared to Scoby's 81, with nearly half of his power shots aimed at the body. With the win, Azim secured the WBO Inter-Continental title.

On 27 November, it was reported that Azim would headline a Boxxer card on BBC Two on 31 January 2026. The card was strategically scheduled before the Holy Month of Ramadan. On 21 December, it was announced that Azim would fight 29-year-old Argentine Gustavo Lemos (30–2, 20 KOs) at Copper Box Arena in London. On 25 January 2026, it was announced that the fight had been postponed after both fighters sustained injuries. By April 2026, the fight was not reschedule and Azim instead observed Ramadan. His trainer McGuigan was hoping for an imminent announcement in regards to his next fight. The fight with Lemos was not rescheduled, as he pulled out completely, and on 29 April, Boxxer announced that Azim would instead fight 36 year old Canadian Steve Claggett (40–8–2, 28 KOs), at the Wembley Arena on 30 May 2026, live on BBC. Claggett was on a two fight win streak after losing a wide decision to former world champion Teofimo Lopez in June 2024. During the press release, Azim said: "This is another big step forward for me on my journey to a world title." Azim weighed in at 139 pounds, whilst Claggett came in at 139.3 pounds. Azim dominated the fight from the opening exchanges and floored Claggett in the second round only for him to be saved by the bell. In the third round, he piled on the pressure and, with his opponent backed up against the ropes and coming under a relentless barrage of blows, the referee stepped in to stop the bout and award Azim the win via technical knockout. His promoter Ben Shalom suggested that he may try to negotiate a "step-aside" deal with either Lindolfo Delgado or Arthur Biyarslanov, who had been ordered to fight for the vacant IBF super lightweight title. His argument was that Azim was a stronger commercial draw and deserving of a title shot now. Azim moved up to no. 4 in the IBF rankings. Despite agreeing a multi-fight deal with DAZN, Shalom indicated that Azim’s next contest was planned for broadcast on the BBC.

On 27 October 2026, it was announced that Azim would next fight Mexican contender Gabriel "Gollaz" Valenzuela (32–5–1, 18 KOs) in a 12-round IBF junior welterweight title eliminator bout. The fight was scheduled to take place at the Copper Box Arena in London on 4 December. At the time, Azim was ranked fourth by the IBF and Valenzuela was ranked sixth. Valenzuela had previously lost both of his previous eliminators against Subriel Matias and Lindolfo Delgado. The winner would put themselves in a strong position to compete for the vacant IBF title in 2027. The event would stream live on DAZN, promoted by Boxxer.

== Personal life ==
Azim is a practicing Muslim.

On 4 July 2025, Azim married actress Dúaa Karim in a private ceremony.

In November 2025, Azim stated his intention to retire at the age of 31 to dedicate more time to family and entrepreneurship. He expressed interest in pursuing a healthy food franchise, influenced by the local restaurants near his gym.

== Awards ==
Azim was named British Boxing Board of Control 2024 Young Boxer of the Year.

== Professional boxing record ==
15 fights	15 wins	0 losses
By knockout	12	0
By decision	3	0

No.	Result	Record	Opponent	Type	Round, time	Date	Location	Notes
15	Win	15–0	Steve Claggett	TKO	3 (12), 1:13	29 May 2026	Wembley Arena, London, England	
14	Win	14–0	Kurt Scoby	TKO	12 (12), 2:00	15 Nov 2025	Tottenham Hotspur Stadium, London, England	Won vacant WBO Inter-Continental light-welterweight title
13	Win	13–0	Sergey Lipinets	TKO	9 (12), 0:33	1 Feb 2025	Wembley Arena, London, England	Won vacant IBO light-welterweight title
12	Win	12–0	Ohara Davies	KO	8 (12), 1:18	19 Oct 2024	Copper Box Arena, London, England	
11	Win	11–0	Enock Poulsen	KO	5 (12), 2:39	3 Feb 2024	Wembley Arena, Wembley, England	Retained European light-welterweight title
10	Win	10–0	Franck Petitjean	TKO	10 (12), 2:17	18 Nov 2023	Civic Hall, Wolverhampton, England	Won European light-welterweight title
9	Win	9–0	Aram Faniian	PTS	10	2 Sep 2023	AO Arena, Manchester, England	
8	Win	8–0	Santos Reyes	UD	10	11 Feb 2023	OVO Arena, London, England	
7	Win	7–0	Rylan Charlton	TKO	2 (10), 0:42	27 Nov 2022	Alexandra Palace, London, England	
6	Win	6–0	Michel Daniel Cabral	KO	1 (10), 1:54	3 Sep 2022	M&S Bank Arena, Liverpool, England	
5	Win	5–0	Anthony Loffet	TKO	1 (10), 1:06	25 Jun 2022	Coventry Skydome, Coventry, England	Won vacant WBC Youth Intercontinental light-welterweight title
4	Win	4–0	Connor Marsden	TKO	1 (8), 0:30	26 Mar 2022	OVO Arena, London, England	
3	Win	3–0	Jordan Ellison	TKO	3 (8), 2:09	19 Feb 2022	AO Arena, Manchester, England	
2	Win	2–0	Stu Greener	TKO	2 (6), 0:20	20 Nov 2021	The SSE Arena, London, England	
1	Win	1–0	Ed Harrison	PTS	6	2 Dec 2020	Production Park Studios, South Kirkby, England	

Sporting positions
Regional boxing titles
Vacant Title last held by Vladimir Myshev	WBC Youth Intercontinental light-welterweight champion 25 June 2022 – present	Incumbent
Vacant Title last held by Robbie Davies Jr.	WBA Continental light-welterweight champion 11 February 2023 – present	Incumbent
