= Jaron Ennis =

American boxer (born 1997)

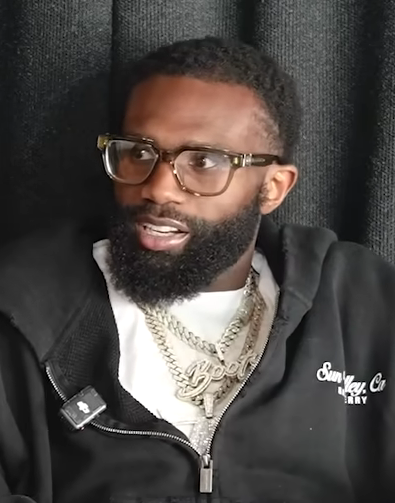
- Ennis in 2026

Personal information
- Nickname: Boots
- Born: June 26, 1997 (age 29) Philadelphia, Pennsylvania, U.S.
- Height: 5 ft 10 in (178 cm)
- Weight: Welterweight; Light middleweight

Boxing career
- Reach: 74 in (188 cm)
- Stance: Southpaw (Note: Listed by BoxRec as orthodox, but regularly switch hits as a southpaw.)

Boxing record
- Total fights: 37
- Wins: 36
- Win by KO: 32
- No contests: 1
Medal record
Men's Amateur boxing
Golden Gloves
Silver medal – second place	2014 Las Vegas	Light welterweight
Gold medal – first place	2015 Las Vegas	Light welterweight
USA Youth National Championships
Gold medal – first place	2015 Reno	Light welterweight

Jaron Ennis (/dʒəˈrɒn/ jə-RON; born June 26, 1997) is an American professional boxer. He is a world champion in two weight classes, having held the unified World Boxing Association (WBA) and World Boxing Organization (WBO) light middleweight titles since June 2026, he previously held the International Boxing Federation (IBF) welterweight title from 2023, before unifying it with the World Boxing Association (WBA) (Super version) and Ring magazine welterweight titles in 2025. As an amateur, he won a silver and gold medal at the U.S. National Golden Gloves Championships in 2014 and 2015 respectively.

== Professional career ==
=== Early career ===
Ennis made his professional debut on April 30, 2016, defeating Cory Muldrew via first-round knockout (KO) at the Dixie Center in St. George, Utah. He fought a further seven times in 2016, scoring four consecutive stoppage wins over Luis Ramos in May; Deshawn Debose in June; Tavorus Teague in July; and Matt Murphy in August. Ennis went the distance for the first time in September, defeating Eddie Diaz by unanimous decision (UD) in a scheduled four-round bout. He saw out the year with two more stoppage wins over Chris Alexander in November and Marcus Beckford in December.

He began 2017 with a first-round KO victory over Elvin Perez in January, followed by the second decision win of his career; a UD against James Winchester in March. Ennis had a further seven fights in 2017, winning all seven by stoppage; Eduardo Flores in May; Wilfredo Acuña and Robert Hill in June; Ricardo Cano in August; Lionel Jiménez in September; Ayi Bruce in October; and George Sosa in December.

Across the following 3 years, Ennis would go on to accumulate 9 more victories. All 9 of those said victories coming within the distance.

He took on and defeated fighters Gustavo Garibay, Samuel Amoako, Mike Arnaoutis, Armando Alvarez, and Raymond Serrano in the year 2018.

Throughout the year 2019, he fought and felled fighters Franklin Mamani in August and Damian Fernandez in October.

And in 2020, he easily dispatched Bakhtiyar Eyubov in January and Juan Carlos Abreu in September.

Ennis had one last fight in 2020 and it was up against former IBO welterweight champion South-African boxer Chris "The Heat" van Heerden. Their scheduled 12-round bout took place on 19 December at the Mohegan Sun Arena, Montville, Connecticut, U.S. and it was for the then-vacant IBO welterweight title.

Despite the early action in the first round seemingly entailing another knockout victory for the Philly-native, an accidental clash of heads opened a terrible gash on the forehead of Van Heerden which made him bleed profusely. Seeing the cut was severe, the referee stepped in and waved off the fight which consequently resulted in it being considered a No-Contest.

=== Rise up the ranks ===
==== Ennis vs. Lipinets ====
On 10 April 2021, Ennis faced the former IBF light-welterweight champion Sergey "Samurai" Lipinets at the Mohegan Sun Arena, Montville, Connecticut, U.S.

Early on, Ennis utilized a superior jab that kept Lipinets at bay and allowed him to keep fighting from a comfortable distance. And whenever Lipinets tried to close the gap by pressuring forward with a tight high-guard, Ennis simply made use of his footwork to pivot out of the way of danger. In key moments, Lipinets did manage to close in on Ennis and hammer away at his body with hooks and uppercuts and even land a few flush right hands on Ennis' jaw. However, Ennis' defensive acumen and proven-sturdy chin negated Lipinets' smattering offensive success and would counter the constantly pressuring Kazakh boxer more and more as the rounds went on. And the end came in the sixth round when Boots, from the southpaw stance, landed a thudding lead right-hook to the Samurai's temple and followed that up by a wicked left uppercut to his jaw that left him flat on his back on the canvas. The referee saw that Lipinets was too stunned to even attempt getting back up, so they did not bother with the 10-count and waved off the fight and thus making Ennis the victor of their bout by way of knock-out.

==== Ennis vs. Dulorme, Clayton ====
On 30 October 2021, at the Michelob Ultra Arena, Paradise, Nevada, United States, Ennis took on Puerto Rican boxer Thomas "El Francés" Dulorme. He would go on to make short work of Dulorme and knock him out in the first round of their scheduled 10-round bout.

Serving as an IBF welterweight title eliminator bout, with the winner supposedly being set in line to become the mandatory of (then) unified WBA, WBC, and IBF welterweight champion Errol "The Truth" Spence Jr., Ennis and Canada-native Custio "War Machine" Clayton clashed in the ring on May 14, 2022, at the Dignity Health Sports Park in Carson, California. Ennis justified his role as an overwhelming favorite to win the bout by knocking out Clayton in the second round with a fully torqued right-hook from the orthodox stance that landed square on Clayton's temple. To Clayton's credit, he did make the attempt to rise, but his equilibrium was too shaken for him to get his feet under him before the referee finished the 10-count.

=== IBF interim welterweight Champion ===
==== Ennis vs. Chukhadzhian ====
Unable to secure a match up with Errol Spence Jr., who was preoccupied with waiting out a welterweight undisputed bout with WBO welterweight champion Terrence "Bud" Crawford, Ennis squared-off against Ukrainian boxer Karen Chukhadzhian on Jan 7, 2023, at the Capital One Arena, Washington, D.C., U.S. With their bout also having the then-vacant IBF welterweight interim-champion title on the line.

Chukhadzhian was dominated by Ennis across every round of their scheduled 12-round bout. All three judges scored the bout 120-108 in favor of Ennis in a unanimous decision victory.

==== Ennis vs. Villa ====
Making the first defense of his IBF welterweight interim-champion title, Ennis took on hard-hitting Colombian boxer Roiman "Flaco de Oro" Villa on 8 July 2023, at The Ballroom, Boardwalk Hall, Atlantic City, U.S.

From the first round, Ennis' superior hand-speed and punch placement made it difficult for Villa to close in the distance. And even with Villa's tight high-guard and forward pressure granting him moments of success, they were greatly eclipsed by Ennis' own offense that was gradually becoming more frequent and coming in longer combinations as the rounds went on.

And in the 10th round, Boots slumped the Colombian slugger on the ropes with a lead left-cross and right hook combination from the southpaw stance which prompted referee David Fields, who had already warned Villa's corner that he would stop the fight if Villa continued to not punch back properly against Boots' barrage of attacks back in the 9th round, to not even start a 10-count and immediately wave off the fight to declare Ennis the winner of their bout by knockout.

And with his 31st victory acquired, Ennis retained his undefeated status along with his welterweight interim-champion title.

=== IBF welterweight champion ===
Three months after the defeat of Errol Spence Jr. on July 29th, 2023, to Terence Crawford, who had then unified the welterweight titles and became the undisputed champion of the division, the IBF ordered Crawford to defend their title—and in conjunction the WBC, WBA, and WBO titles—against Ennis who is his IBF-mandatory. Crawford did not take the fight, and the IBF subsequently stripped Crawford of their title on November 9, 2023, promoting Jaron Ennis to (full) IBF welterweight champion.

==== Ennis vs. Avanesyan ====
Ennis was scheduled to defend his IBF welterweight title against Cody Crowley at Wells Fargo Center in Philadelphia, Pennsylvania on July 13, 2024. Early June, Crowley announced that he was forced to withdraw from the bout due to retina issue. On June 11, 2024 David Avanesyan was announced as a new opponent for Ennis. Ennis defeated Avanesyan via fifth-round RTD.

==== Ennis vs. Chukhadzhian II ====
Ennis defended his IBF welterweight title in a second bout against Karen Chukhadzhian at Wells Fargo Center in Philadelphia on November 9, 2024.

=== IBF & WBA welterweight unification ===
==== Ennis vs. Stanionis ====
Holding the IBF welterweight title, Ennis was scheduled to fight WBA welterweight champion Eimantas Stanionis 15-0 (9 KOs) for the unified titles on April 12, 2025 at Jim Whelan Boardwalk Hall in Atlantic City, New Jersey. Ennis defeated Stanionis by corner retirement in the sixth round, successfully unifying the IBF and WBA welterweight titles in a commanding performance. Ennis began the bout by effectively utilizing his jab and a variety of combinations, establishing control early on. While Stanionis managed to land a few punches, Ennis's superior speed and accuracy set the tone for the fight. As the rounds progressed, Ennis maintained his momentum, targeting both Stanionis’s body and head. Although Stanionis attempted to apply pressure, he struggled to connect with significant blows while facing effective counterattacks. The sixth round proved to be decisive as Ennis escalated his offensive strategy, ultimately knocking Stanionis down. Following this round, Stanionis's corner made the decision to retire him from the fight, acknowledging that he was unable to continue. Over the six rounds, Ennis landed 81 of 424 punches (19.1%) and Stanionis landed 58 of 185 (31.4%). The low accuracy in Ennis's shots came from his jabs, where he landed more than half of his total punches thrown, only landing 7%.

On July 7, 2025, Ennis officially relinquished his IBF title, a move that had been anticipated since he announced his intention to ascend to the super welterweight division the previous month. On July 26, 2025, Ennis finalized a long-term multi-fight promotional agreement with Eddie Hearn's Matchroom Boxing and DAZN. On August 1, 2025, Ennis vacated his WBA title, with Regular champion Rolly Romero thus elevated to full champion.

=== Super welterweight ===
==== Ennis vs. Lima ====
On August 11, 2025, Matchroom Boxing announced that Ennis would make his super welterweight debut in his home state of Pennsylvania at the Xfinity Mobile Arena in Philadelphia on October 11 against Uisma Lima (14-1, 10 KOs), with the IBO title at stake. The fight was scheduled to be a WBA title eliminator. Lima had not yet made his US debut and was on a four-fight winning streak since his only career loss to Aaron McKenna in 2023. The matchup received criticism due to Lima's limited recognition in the boxing community. Hearn defended the fight by pointing out Lima's ranking in the top 10 by three sanctioning bodies and his position as the IBO champion. He stated that Ennis required a challenging opponent, mentioning that eight boxers declined to compete against him despite lucrative offers. Fans had anticipated a more high-profile opponent for Ennis following his decision to vacate his welterweight titles and move up in weight class. Hearn reassured that if Ennis was victorious, he would face more prominent contenders in future fights. DraftKings designated Ennis as a 25-1 favorite. The stakes were raised during fight week as it was announced that the vacant interim WBA title would be awarded to the winner and be in line to challenge full titleholder Abass Baraou. Ennis won by first-round TKO in just under two minutes, securing the vacant WBA Interim title. He began the fight in an orthodox stance, establishing his jab and directing punches at Lima’s body and head. A right uppercut caught Lima off guard, leading to exchanges between the two, but Ennis connected with a left-right combination that knocked Lima down for the first time. After Lima managed to recover, Ennis delivered another strong combination, resulting in a second knockdown. Lima was unable to recover fully as Ennis continued to deliver punches, prompting the referee to stop the fight at 1:58 of the round. Following the victory, Ennis expressed interest in facing Vergil Ortiz Jr. as a potential next opponent.

==== Ennis vs. Zayas ====
Ennis won his unified WBA and WBO super welterweight titles to Xander Zayas at Barclays Center in Brooklyn, NY on June 27, 2026. Ennis fought a high-pace fight and dropped Zayas once in the first, fifth, and seventh before the referee called off the fight at the behest of Zayas's corner. Ennis appeared staggered in the third round as Zayas took the offensive, though Ennis later denied being hurt, claiming that he "was chilling." After his victory over Zayas, Ennis was ranked #9 on The Ring's pound-for-pound list, and proclaimed himself the "face of boxing."

== Boxing style ==
Ennis's boxing style can be summarized as a highly versatile, aggressive, and aesthetically-pleasing blend of power, speed, and technical skill. He is a natural switch-hitter who fluidly changes stances (orthodox and southpaw), which confuses opponents and allows him to create angles for attack. He possesses exceptional power in both hands, complemented by very fast hand speed, making his combinations both heavy and quick.

He effectively uses the Philly Shell defense to block and deflect punches, which sets up his aggressive counter-punching. His jab is not a basic tool but a multi-faceted weapon. He uses a head jab to probe, disrupt rhythm, and set up combinations. A body jab to sap energy and draw the opponent's guard down. He uses a double jab to force defensive reactions and create openings. His gazelle jab is a jab combined with a hop or pivot to change angles and evade counters.

A signature trait is his willingness to stand in front of opponents using feints to bait them into attacking before launching counterpunches. He uses his feet to control distance and pace. He is adept at cutting off the ring, quickly repositioning from the ropes to the center, and shifting in and out of range effortlessly.

He throws punches in high-volume combinations while constantly changing the level (head to body) and angles of his attacks. This disrupts an opponent's defense and rhythm, making it difficult to anticipate or block his shots. Ennis is an aggressive fighter who would rather stay in front of his opponents and beat them than win a cautious points decision. He is a physically large and strong welterweight with a high knockout ratio, often seeking to finish fights early.

== Professional boxing record ==
37 fights	36 wins	0 losses
By knockout	32	0
By decision	4	0
No contests	1	

No.	Result	Record	Opponent	Type	Round, time	Date	Location	Notes
37	Win	36–0 (1)	Xander Zayas	TKO	7 (12), 1:49	Jun 27, 2026	Barclays Center, New York City, New York, U.S.	Won WBA and WBO light middleweight titles
36	Win	35–0 (1)	Uisma Lima	TKO	1 (12), 1:58	Oct 11, 2025	Xfinity Mobile Arena, Philadelphia, Pennsylvania, U.S.	Won vacant WBA interim light middleweight title
35	Win	34–0 (1)	Eimantas Stanionis	RTD	6 (12), 3:00	Apr 12, 2025	Jim Whelan Boardwalk Hall, Atlantic City, New Jersey, U.S.	Retained IBF welterweight title; Won WBA and vacant The Ring welterweight titles
34	Win	33–0 (1)	Karen Chukhadzhian	UD	12	Nov 9, 2024	Wells Fargo Center, Philadelphia, Pennsylvania, U.S.	Retained IBF welterweight title
33	Win	32–0 (1)	David Avanesyan	RTD	5 (12), 3:00	Jul 13, 2024	Wells Fargo Center, Philadelphia, Pennsylvania, U.S.	Retained IBF welterweight title
32	Win	31–0 (1)	Roiman Villa	KO	10 (12), 1:27	Jul 8, 2023	Jim Whelan Boardwalk Hall, Atlantic City, New Jersey, U.S.	Retained IBF interim welterweight title
31	Win	30–0 (1)	Karen Chukhadzhian	UD	12	Jan 7, 2023	Capital One Arena, Washington, D.C., U.S.	Won vacant IBF interim welterweight title
30	Win	29–0 (1)	Custio Clayton	KO	2 (12), 2:49	May 14, 2022	Dignity Health Sports Park, Carson, California, U.S.	
29	Win	28–0 (1)	Thomas Dulorme	KO	1 (10), 1:49	Oct 30, 2021	Michelob Ultra Arena, Paradise, Nevada, U.S.	
28	Win	27–0 (1)	Sergey Lipinets	KO	6 (12), 2:11	Apr 10, 2021	Mohegan Sun Arena, Montville, Connecticut, U.S.	
27	NC	26–0 (1)	Chris van Heerden	NC	1 (12), 3:00	Dec 19, 2020	Mohegan Sun Arena, Montville, Connecticut, U.S.	For vacant IBO welterweight title; van Heerden cut from an accidental head clash
26	Win	26–0	Juan Carlos Abreu	TKO	6 (10), 1:06	Sep 19, 2020	Mohegan Sun Arena, Montville, Connecticut, U.S.	
25	Win	25–0	Bakhtiyar Eyubov	TKO	4 (10), 0:34	Jan 10, 2020	Dort Federal Event Center, Flint, Michigan, U.S.	
24	Win	24–0	Damian Fernandez	TKO	3 (10), 2:10	Oct 5, 2019	Ocean Resort Casino, Atlantic City, New Jersey, U.S.	
23	Win	23–0	Franklin Mamani	RTD	1 (10), 3:00	Aug 23, 2019	Central Park Community Center, Broken Arrow, Oklahoma, U.S.	
22	Win	22–0	Raymond Serrano	KO	2 (10), 1:12	Nov 16, 2018	2300 Arena, Philadelphia, Pennsylvania, U.S.	
21	Win	21–0	Armando Alvarez	TKO	3 (10), 2:59	Jul 20, 2018	WinnaVegas Casino and Resort, Sloan, Iowa, U.S.	Won vacant WBC–USNBC Silver welterweight title
20	Win	20–0	Mike Arnaoutis	TKO	2 (10), 2:59	Jun 1, 2018	Showboat Hotel and Casino, Atlantic City, New Jersey, U.S.	
19	Win	19–0	Samuel Amoako	TKO	1 (8)	Apr 14, 2018	Masonic Temple, Norfolk, Virginia, U.S.	
18	Win	18–0	Gustavo Garibay	TKO	4 (6), 2:14	Jan 26, 2018	SugarHouse Casino, Philadelphia, Pennsylvania, U.S.	
17	Win	17–0	George Sosa	KO	2 (8), 1:09	Dec 1, 2017	2300 Arena, Philadelphia, Pennsylvania, U.S.	
16	Win	16–0	Ayi Bruce	TKO	1 (6), 1:37	Oct 14, 2017	ABC Sports Complex, Springfield, Virginia, U.S.	
15	Win	15–0	Lionel Jimenez	KO	1 (6), 2:43	Sep 23, 2017	National Guard Armory, Hammond, Indiana, U.S.	
14	Win	14–0	Ricardo Cano	KO	1 (8), 0:40	Aug 12, 2017	Howard Theater, Washington, D.C., U.S.	
13	Win	13–0	Robert Hill	RTD	3 (6), 3:00	Jun 22, 2017	Durham Armory, Durham, North Carolina, U.S.	
12	Win	12–0	Wilfredo Acuña	KO	1 (6), 1:23	Jun 2, 2017	2300 Arena, Philadelphia, Pennsylvania, U.S.	
11	Win	11–0	Eduardo Flores	TKO	4 (6), 1:57	May 13, 2017	Mason Temple, Norfolk, Virginia, U.S.	
10	Win	10–0	James Winchester	UD	6	Mar 31, 2017	2300 Arena, Philadelphia, Pennsylvania, U.S.	
9	Win	9–0	Elvin Perez	KO	1 (6), 0:35	Jan 28, 2017	2300 Arena, Philadelphia, Pennsylvania, U.S.	
8	Win	8–0	Marcus Beckford	TKO	6 (6), 0:55	Dec 16, 2016	SugarHouse Casino, Philadelphia, Pennsylvania, U.S.	
7	Win	7–0	Chris Alexander	RTD	4 (6), 3:00	Nov 11, 2016	2300 Arena, Philadelphia, Pennsylvania, U.S.	
6	Win	6–0	Eddie Diaz	UD	4	Sep 15, 2016	2300 Arena, Philadelphia, Pennsylvania, U.S.	
5	Win	5–0	Matt Murphy	KO	2 (4), 2:52	Aug 6, 2016	Grundy Arena, Bristol, Pennsylvania, U.S.	
4	Win	4–0	Tavorus Teague	TKO	4 (4), 1:38	Jul 9, 2016	Santa Ana Star Center, Rio Rancho, New Mexico, U.S.	
3	Win	3–0	Deshawn Debose	KO	1 (4), 0:20	Jun 11, 2016	ABC Sports Complex, Springfield, Virginia, U.S.	
2	Win	2–0	Luis Ramos	TKO	1 (4), 0:23	May 14, 2016	PA Sheet Metal Workers Hall, Philadelphia, Pennsylvania, U.S.	
1	Win	1–0	Cory Muldrew	KO	1 (4), 0:42	Apr 30, 2016	Dixie Center, St. George, Utah, U.S.	

== Titles in boxing ==
=== Major world titles ===
- WBA (Super) welterweight champion (147 lbs)
- IBF welterweight champion (147 lbs)
- WBA light middleweight champion (154 lbs)
- WBO light middleweight champion (154 lbs)

=== The Ring magazine titles ===
- The Ring welterweight champion (147 lbs)

=== Interim world titles ===
- IBF interim welterweight champion (147 lbs)
- WBA interim light middleweight champion (154 lbs)

== See also ==
- List of male boxers
- List of world welterweight boxing champions
- List of world light-middleweight boxing champions

Sporting positions
Amateur boxing titles
Previous: Gary Antuanne Russell	U.S. Golden Gloves light welterweight champion 2015	Next: Frank Martin
Regional boxing titles
Vacant Title last held by Peter Dobson	WBC USA Silver welterweight champion July 20, 2018 - 2019; Vacated	Vacant Title next held by Anthony Young
World boxing titles
New title	IBF welterweight champion Interim title January 7, 2023 – November 9, 2023; Promoted	Vacant
Preceded by Terence Crawford stripped	IBF welterweight champion November 9, 2023 – July 7, 2025; Vacated	Vacant Title next held by Lewis Crocker
Vacant Title last held by Terence Crawford	WBA welterweight champion Super title April 12 – August 1, 2025; Vacated	Vacant Title next held by Rolando Romero
Vacant Title last held by Terence Crawford	The Ring welterweight champion April 12 – August 7, 2025; Vacated	Vacant
Vacant Title last held by Abass Baraou	WBA light middleweight champion Interim title October 11, 2025 – June 27, 2026; Won bid for full title	Vacant
Preceded by Xander Zayas	WBA light middleweight champion June 27, 2026 – present	Incumbent
Preceded by Xander Zayas	WBO light middleweight champion June 27, 2026 – present	Incumbent
Awards
Previous: Vergil Ortiz Jr.	The Ring Prospect of the Year; 2020	Next: Brandun Lee
