= Ben Shalom =

British boxing promoter (born 1993)

Personal information
- Nationality: British
- Born: Benjamin Saul Shalom; 1993 (age 32–33) Manchester, England
- Education: University of Nottingham

Boxing career

Benjamin Saul Shalom (born October 1993) is a British boxing promoter. He is the youngest ever British boxing promoter and the founder of Boxxer.

== Early life ==
Shalom was born in Salford, Manchester and grew up training with a number of boxers in the local area, giving him an early interest in the sport. He subsequently attended the University of Nottingham in pursuit of a law degree. During his time in university, he developed an interest in organising and promoting night events.

== Career as a promoter ==
At the age of 23, Shalom shifted careers. He obtained a promoter's licence from the British Boxing Board of Control and founded Boxxer, stylised as "BOXXER".

The company rose to prominence in 2021 when Shalom and Boxxer were awarded an exclusive broadcast agreement with Sky Sports. The deal was signed as a four-year contract, aimed at replacing an outgoing contract with Eddie Hearn, who had left to join DAZN. Shalom has signed and acted as promoter for prominent boxers such as Adam Azim and Chris Eubank Jr, notably acting for the latter as promoter in the Chris Eubank Jr vs. Conor Benn fight in October 2022.

In 2025, speculation began to grow that Shalom may lose his role as designated Sky Sports promoter, on account of unexpected undercard changes and fighter pullouts throughout late 2024 to early 2025. On 9 June 2025, it was revealed that Sky Sports would not renew the broadcast deal.
