= Uisma Lima =

South African professional boxer (born 1993)

Personal information
- Born: Uisma Dos Ramos Lima; 1 February 1993 (age 33) Luanda, Angola
- Weight: Super welterweight

Boxing career
- Stance: Southpaw

Boxing record
- Total fights: 19
- Wins: 16
- Win by KO: 11
- Losses: 3

Uisma Dos Ramos Lima (born 1 February 1993) is an Angolan professional boxer. He has held the IBO super-welterweight title.

== Professional career ==
=== Lima vs. McKenna ===
After Shakiel Thompson had to withdraw near the day of the fight Lima was a late replacement to fight Irishman Aaron McKenna for the vacant WBC International middleweight title. McKenna won the fight and dominated throughout although he did sustain a cut on his eye in the fourth round and by the tenth round it was almost completely shut.

=== Lima vs. Matevosyan ===
Lima produced a big upset when he travelled to Germany and stopped Armenian Haro Matevosyan in the 10th round. Matevosyan defended well early on but offered nothing offensively. As the fight progressed he got slower and tired too badly so his corner pulled him out. With the win, Lima claimed the IBF inter-continental super welterweight title.

=== Lima vs. Bhatti ===
Lima claimed the biggest win of his career by beating unbeaten and defending champion Indian Sukhdeep Singh Bhatti on points to claim the IBO super-welterweight title. Despite being a big underdog Lima dominated from start to finish.

=== Lima vs. Koopman ===
Lima defended his title against Shervantaigh Koopman at Emperors Palace in Kempton Park, South Africa, on 31 May 2025, winning by ninth round stoppage.

=== Lima vs. Ennis ===
He faced Jaron Ennis for the vacant WBA interim super-welterweight title at the Wells Fargo Center in Philadelphia, USA, on 11 October 2025. Lima was knocked to the canvas twice before the fight was stopped inside two minutes of the first round.

== Professional boxing record ==
19 fights	16 wins	3 losses
By knockout	11	1
By decision	5	2

No.	Result	Record	Opponent	Type	Round, time	Date	Location	Notes
19	Loss	16–3	Bakary Samake	UD	12	14 Nov 2026	Palais des Sports Marcel-Cerdan, Levallois-Perret, France	For vacant WBC Silver light-middleweight title
18	Win	16–2	Souleimane Mohammedi	TKO	9 (10)	25 Apr 2026	Pasino Grand Aix, Aix-en-Provence, France	Won vacant WBC International light-middleweight title
17	Win	15–2	Luis Enrique Montelongo	UD	6	31 Jan 2026	Polideportivo Municipal, Bescano, Spain	
16	Loss	14–2	Jaron Ennis	TKO	1 (12), 1:58	11 Oct 2025	Wells Fargo Center, Philadelphia, United States	For vacant WBA interim light-middleweight title
15	Win	14–1	Shervantaigh Koopman	TKO	9 (12), 2:37	31 May 2025	Emperors Palace, Kempton Park, South Africa	Retained IBO light-middleweight title
14	Win	13–1	Sukhdeep Singh Bhatti	UD	12	12 Dec 2024	Toronto Casino Resort, Toronto, Ontario, Canada	Won vacant IBO light-middleweight title
13	Win	12–1	Haro Matevosyan	RTD	10 (12), 3:00	6 Apr 2024	Stadthalle, Falkensee, Germany	Won IBF Inter-Continental light-middleweight title
12	Win	11–1	Araik Marutjan	UD	8	25 Nov 2023	Verti Music Hall, Berlin, Germany	
11	Loss	10–1	Aaron McKenna	UD	10	16 Jun 2023	York Hall, London, England	For vacant WBO International middleweight title
10	Win	10–0	Lesther Espino	KO	2 (8), 0:46	14 Apr 2023	Glasgow Boxing Academy, Glasgow, Scotland	
9	Win	9–0	Ruben Angulo	TKO	1 (8), 1:03	10 Feb 2023	Vale Sports Arena, Cardiff, Wales	
8	Win	8–0	Eligio Palacios	UD	6	10 Dec 2022	Sala ANMLS, Marbella, Spain	
7	Win	7–0	Giorgi Umekashvili	TKO	3 (6)	24 Apr 2022	Sheraton Porto Hotel Spa, Porto, Portugal	
6	Win	6–0	Jeffrey Rosales	UD	6	11 Sep 2021	Pabellón Municipal, Noia, Spain	
5	Win	5–0	Edwin Palacios	TKO	1 (6)	7 Mar 2020	Pavilhão Gimnodesportivo Municipal de Fânzeres, Gondomar, Portugal	
4	Win	4–0	Miguel Aguilar	TKO	2 (4)	1 Nov 2019	Centro de Desportos e Congressos, Matosinhos, Portugal	
3	Win	3–0	Michael Mora	TKO	2 (6)	20 Apr 2019	Centro de Desportos e Congressos, Matosinhos, Portugal	
2	Win	2–0	Mansur Muti	TKO	6 (6)	31 Mar 2019	Recinto Ferial, Santa Cruz de Tenerife, Spain	
1	Win	1–0	Youssouf Kone	TKO	3 (4)	23 Feb 2019	Martorell, Spain	
