= Steve Claggett =

Canadian boxer (born 1994)

Personal information
- Nickname: Dragon
- Born: June 11, 1989 (age 37) Calgary, Alberta, Canada
- Height: 5 ft 8 in (173 cm)
- Weight: Super-lightweight, Welterweight

Boxing career
- Reach: 70 in (178 cm)
- Stance: Orthodox

Boxing record
- Total fights: 51
- Wins: 40
- Win by KO: 28
- Losses: 9
- Draws: 2

Steve Claggett (born June 11, 1989) is a Canadian professional boxer who challenged for the World Boxing Organization (WBO) super-lightweight title in 2024. He has won multiple regional accolades including the NABF and IBF North American super-lightweight titles and the Canadian welterweight championship.

== Early life ==
Claggett has Chinese ancestry through his maternal grandfather. At age 19 he started having trouble with the law which led to boxing to help cope.

== Amateur career ==
Claggett had a successful amateur career with 29 fights and winning the Alberta Provincial Championships and in 2007, the Canadian National Championships.

== Professional career ==
Having made his professional debut in 2008, Claggett won the vacant Canadian welterweight title in his 20th pro-fight by stopping Francesco Cotroni in the sixth round at the Convention Centre in Edmonton on 13 September 2013.

On 9 September 2016, he won the vacant NABA USA super-lightweight title, defeating the previously unbeaten Emanuel Robles via split decision at the Downtown Las Vegas Event Center in Las Vegas, Nevada, United States.

Claggett won the vacant IBF North American super-lightweight title with a split decision success over another previously undefeated fighter, Yves Ulysse Jr., at MTelus in Montreal on 27 October 2017.

He knocked former world champion Alberto Machado to the canvas three times before the referee stepped in and stopped their fight for the vacant NABF super-lightweight title at Montreal Casino in Montreal on 1 June 2023.

Claggett defeated Miguel Madueno via unanimous decision at Montreal Casino on 14 November 2024, claiming the vacant WBO International super-lightweight title.

He challenged WBO super-lightweight champion Teofimo Lopez at the James J. Knight Arena in Miami Beach, Florida, United States, on 29 June 2024, losing by unanimous decision.

In his next fight, Claggett got back to winning with a fourth round technical knockout of Eduardo Estela at Lac Leamy Casino in Gatineau on 17 October 2024.

After almost 17 months away from the competitive boxing ring due to an injury to his left shoulder, he returned to face Alejandro Frias Rodriguez at Montreal Casino on 5 March 2026, winning via technical knockout in the second round.

Next Claggett took on Adam Azim at Wembley Arena in London, England, on 30 May 2026, suffering the first stoppage defeat of his career when the referee halted the contest in the third round as Claggett came under heavy, unanswered punishment against the ropes having been sent to the canvas in the previous round.

== Professional boxing record ==
49 fights	39 wins	8 losses
By knockout	27	1
By decision	12	7
Draws	2	

No.	Result	Record	Opponent	Type	Round, time	Date	Location	Notes
51	Loss	40–9–2	Adam Azim	TKO	3 (12), 1:13	May 30, 2026	Wembley Arena, London, England	
50	Win	40–8–2	Alejandro Frias Rodriguez	TKO	2 (10), 2:13	Mar 5, 2026	Montreal Casino, Montreal, Quebec, Canada	
49	Win	39–8–2	Eduardo Estela	TKO	4 (10), 2:45	Oct 17, 2024	Lac Leamy Casino, Gatineau, Canada	
48	Loss	38–8–2	Teofimo Lopez	UD	12	Jun 29, 2024	James J. Knight Arena, Miami Beach, Florida, U.S.	For WBO and The Ring light-welterweight titles
47	Win	38–7–2	Marcos Gonzalez Barraza	RTD	2 (8), 3:00	Jan 25, 2024	Montreal Casino, Montreal, Quebec, Canada	
46	Win	37–7–2	Miguel Madueno	UD	10	Nov 14, 2023	Montreal Casino, Montreal, Quebec, Canada	Retained NABF light-welterweight title; Won vacant WBO International light-welterweight title
45	Win	36–7–2	Carlos Sanchez	UD	10	Sep 8, 2023	Lac Leamy Casino, Gatineau, Quebec, Canada	Retained NABF light-welterweight title
44	Win	35–7–2	Alberto Machado	TKO	3 (10), 2:29	Jun 1, 2023	Montreal Casino, Montreal, Quebec, Canada	Won vacant NABF light-welterweight title
43	Win	34–7–2	Rafael Guzman Lugo	RTD	7 (10), 3:00	Mar 23, 2023	Montreal Casino, Montreal, Quebec, Canada	
42	Win	33–7–2	Jonathan Jose Eniz	TKO	4 (10), 2:06	Oct 27, 2022	Lac Leamy Casino, Gatineau, Quebec, Canada	
41	Win	32–7–2	Tony Luis	TKO	7 (10), 0:21	Aug 6, 2022	Civic Complex, Cornwall, Ontario, Canada	
40	Win	31–7–2	Sebastian Ezequiel Aguirre	RTD	9 (10), 3:00	Mar 3, 2022	Montreal Casino, Montreal, Quebec, Canada	
39	Win	30–7–2	Emanuel Lopez	KO	4 (8), 0:35	Aug 27, 2021	Hotel Holiday Inn, Cuernavaca, Mexico	
38	Loss	29–7–2	Mathieu Germain	SD	10	May 15, 2021	Hilton, Quebec City, Quebec, Canada	
37	Win	29–6–2	David Theroux	RTD	6 (10), 3:00	Nov 21, 2020	Hotel Rimouski, Rimouski, Quebec, Canada	Won vacant WBC Francophone light-welterweight title
36	Win	28–6–2	Nazareno Gaston Ruiz	TKO	8 (8), 1:56	Oct 25, 2019	Complexe Capitale Helicoptere, Quebec City, Quebec, Canada	
35	Loss	27–6–2	Yves Ulysse Jr.	UD	10	April 25, 2019	Fantasy Springs Casino, Indio, California, U.S.	
34	Draw	27–5–2	Mathieu Germain	SD	10	Jan 26, 2019	Montreal Casino, Montreal, Quebec, Canada	Retained IBF International light-welterweight title; For IBF North American light-welterweight title
33	Win	27–5–1	Petros Ananyan	UD	10	Jul 28, 2018	CAA Centre, Brampton, Ontario, Canada	Won IBF International light-welterweight title
32	Loss	26–5–1	Danny O' Connor	UD	10	May 26, 2018	House of Blues, Boston, Massachusetts, U.S.	For WBC International Silver light-welterweight title
31	Win	26–4–1	Yves Ulysse Jr.	SD	10	Oct 27, 2017	MTelus, Montreal, Quebec, Canada	Won vacant IBF North American light-welterweight title
30	Win	25–4–1	Juan Daniel Bedolla Orozco	TKO	5 (8), 0:01	Feb 18, 2017	Genesis Centre, Calgary, Alberta, Canada	
29	Win	24–4–1	Emanuel Robles	SD	10	Sep 9, 2016	Downtown Las Vegas Event Center, Las Vegas, Nevada, U.S.	Won vacant NABA USA light-welterweight title
28	Loss	23–4–1	Chris van Heerden	MD	10	Apr 16, 2016	Downtown Las Vegas Event Center, Las Vegas, Nevada, U.S.	
27	Win	23–3–1	Stuart McLellan	TKO	3 (10), 2:21	Sep 18, 2015	Deerfoot Inn & Casino, Calgary, Canada	Won vacant CPBC welterweight title
26	Win	22–3–1	Stephane Benito	TKO	3 (8), 1:35	Aug 21, 2015	Century Casino, Calgary, Alberta, Canada	
25	Win	21–3–1	Tebor Brosch	UD	10	Apr 3, 2015	Deerfoot Inn & Casino, Calgary, Canada	Retained Canadian welterweight title
24	Loss	20–3–1	Konstantin Ponomarev	UD	8	Jan 24, 2015	1stBank Center, Broomfield, Colorado, U.S.	
23	Win	20–2–1	Rogelio Castaneda Jr	TKO	3 (8), 2:42	Nov 21, 2014	Chinese Cultural Centre, Calgary, Alberta, Canada	
22	Win	19–2–1	Gyula Vajda	KO	2 (8), 0:29	Feb 7, 2014	Chinese Cultural Centre, Calgary, Alberta, Canada	
21	Win	18–2–1	Giuseppe Lauri	UD	8	Nov 9, 2013	Cowboys Casino, Calgary, Alberta, Canada	
20	Win	17–2–1	Francesco Cotroni	TKO	6 (10), 2:58	Sep 13, 2013	Edmonton Convention Centre, Edmonton, Alberta, Canada	Won vacant Canadian welterweight title
19	Win	16–2–1	Paul Bzdel	TKO	4 (6), 2:47	May 31, 2013	Edmonton Convention Centre, Edmonton, Alberta, Canada	
18	Loss	15–2–1	Alexandre Lepelley	SD	10	Mar 2, 2013	Edmonton Convention Centre, Edmonton, Alberta, Canada	
17	Win	15–1–1	Ricky Duenas	RTD	4 (8), 3:00	Oct 19, 2012	DoubleTree Hotel, Ontario, California, U.S.	
16	Win	14–1–1	Laszlo Robert Balogh	KO	2 (8), 1:32	May 11, 2012	Chinese Cultural Centre, Calgary, Alberta, Canada	
15	Win	13–1–1	Ryan Wagner	TKO	6 (8), 1:25	Jan 13, 2012	Desperados Night Club, Calgary, Alberta, Canada	
14	Win	12–1–1	Antonio Dos Santos	TKO	4 (5), 2:05	Nov 19, 2011	Desperados Night Club, Calgary, Alberta, Canada	
13	Loss	11–1–1	Romeo Jakosalem	TKO	8 (8), 1:26	Mar 19, 2011	Cebu City Waterfront Hotel, Cebu City, Philippines	
12	Win	11–0–1	Julio Mendoza Rodriguez	TKO	3 (10), 2:54	Jan 14, 2011	Chinese Cultural Centre, Calgary, Alberta, Canada	Won vacant WBC Youth Intercontinental light-welterweight title
11	Win	10–0–1	David Aucoin	KO	3 (8), 0:23	Sep 25, 2010	Deerfoot Inn & Casino, Calgary, Alberta, Canada	
10	Win	9–0–1	Abdou Sow	UD	8	Aug 19, 2010	Deerfoot Inn & Casino, Calgary, Alberta, Canada	
9	Win	8–0–1	Martin Armenta Chaparro	TKO	2 (8), 2:59	May 15, 2010	Bowness Sports Plex, Calgary, Alberta, Canada	
8	Win	7–0–1	Walter Linthorne	TKO	2 (6), 0:36	Mar 6, 2010	Bowness Sports Plex, Calgary, Alberta, Canada	
7	Win	6–0–1	Michael Maley	TKO	1 (6), 1:31	Feb 13, 2010	Edmonton Convention Centre, Edmonton, Alberta, Canada	
6	Win	5–0–1	Scott Paul	UD	6	Nov 13, 2009	Edmonton Convention Centre, Edmonton, Alberta, Canada	
5	Draw	4–0–1	Dave Petryk	SD	4	Aug 28, 2009	Edmonton Convention Centre, Edmonton, Alberta, Canada	
4	Win	4–0	Bill Arnott	TKO	2 (4), 1:06	Apr 9, 2009	Edmonton Convention Centre, Edmonton, Alberta, Canada	
3	Win	3–0	Harrison McBain	UD	4	Jan 24, 2009	Edmonton Convention Centre, Edmonton, Alberta, Canada	
2	Win	2–0	Dave Petryk	MD	4	Nov 7, 2008	Edmonton Convention Centre, Edmonton, Alberta, Canada	
1	Win	1–0	Brandon Carlick	MD	4	Sep 12, 2008	Edmonton Convention Centre, Edmonton, Alberta, Canada	

Achievements
Vacant Title last held by Teofimo Lopez	NABF junior welterweight champion June 1, 2023 – May 2024; Vacated	Vacant Title next held by Movladdin Biyarslanov
Vacant Title last held by Teofimo Lopez	WBO International super lightweight champion November 14, 2023 – June 29, 2024; Failed to win world title	Vacant Title next held by Jack Catterall
