= Shervantaigh Koopman =

South African professional boxer (born 1994)

Personal information
- Born: 16 May 1994 (age 32) Pretoria, Gaugeng, South Africa
- Weight: Super welterweight

Boxing career
- Stance: Orthodox

Boxing record
- Total fights: 16
- Wins: 15
- Win by KO: 10
- Losses: 1

Shervantaigh Koopman (born May 16, 1994) is a South African professional boxer. He has challenged for the IBO super-welterweight title.

== Professional career ==
=== Koopman vs Thysse ===
The first big win of Koopmans career came against fellow South African Brandon Thysse. Despite having knocked Thysse down in the second round he had to overcome adversary in the fourth round. The deciding moment came in the 8th round when Koopman dropped Thysse for a second time causing his corner to pull him out at the end of the round.

=== Koopman vs Toussaint ===
Koopman fought American Wendy Toussaint at the Emperors Palace in Kemptons Park. Despite Toussaint fighting on the backfoot all fight, Koopman managed to land enough meaningful punches to get the decision. With the win Koopman claimed the IBO Inter Continental Junior Middleweight title

=== Koopman vs Cook ===
Koopman claimed the biggest win of his career so far against former super welterweight world title challenger Brandon Cook. The fight was stopped in the fifth round due a bad cut on Cook's forehead.

=== Koopman vs Lima ===
Koopman challenged IBO super-welterweight champion Uisma Lima at Emperors Palace on 31 May 2025, but lost by stoppage in the ninth round.

== Professional boxing record ==
16 fights	15 wins	1 loss
By knockout	10	1
By decision	5	0

No.	Result	Record	Opponent	Type	Round, time	Date	Location	Notes
16	Loss	15–1	Uisma Lima	TKO	9 (12)	31 May 2025	Emperors Palace, Kempton Park, Gauteng, South Africa	For IBO super-welterweight title
15	Win	15–0	Brandon Cook	TKO	5 (12)	26 Oct 2024	Emperors Palace, Kempton Park, Gauteng, South Africa	
14	Win	14–0	Wendy Toussaint	UD	10	15 Jun 2024	Emperors Palace, Kempton Park, Gauteng, South Africa	
13	Win	13–0	Cristiano Ndombassy	UD	8	25 Nov 2023	Emperors Palace, Kempton Park, Gauteng, South Africa	
12	Win	12–0	Brandon Thysse	RTD	8 (12)	2 Sep 2023	Emperors Palace, Kempton Park, Gauteng, South Africa	
11	Win	11–0	Jackson Kaptein	TKO	8 (12)	18 Mar 2023	Emperors Palace, Kempton Park, Gauteng, South Africa	
10	Win	10–0	Jami Webb	TKO	5 (12)	26 Mar 2022	Emperors Palace, Kempton Park, Gauteng, South Africa	
9	Win	9–0	Henriques Lando	UD	10	4 Dec 2021	Emperors Palace, Kempton Park, Gauteng, South Africa	
8	Win	8–0	Simon Dladla	KO	7 (12)	25 Sep 2021	Emperors Palace, Kempton Park, Gauteng, South Africa	
7	Win	7–0	Jacques Tshikubu Muvud	UD	6	19 Jun 2021	Emperors Palace, Kempton Park, Gauteng, South Africa	
6	Win	6–0	Junior Makondo	TKO	3 (6), 2:36	14 Mar 2021	Emperors Palace Kempton Park, South Africa	
5	Win	5–0	Wandile Ndlela	UD	4	20 Oct 2019	Time Square, Pretoria, South Africa	
4	Win	4–0	Lungelo Dube	TKO	2 (6)	28 Jul 2019	Orient Theatre East London, South Africa	
3	Win	3–0	Francis Matika	TKO	1 (4)	30 Mar 2019	Kagiso Hall,Krugersdorp, South Africa	
2	Win	2–0	Charles Ondjeke	TKO	1 (4),	21 Sep 2018	Carnival City, Brakpan, South Africa	
1	Win	1–0	Phelelani Buthelezi	TKO	2 (4)	31 May 2018	Presleys Restaurant, Boksburg, South Africa	
