= Dixie Center =

Convention center in St. George, Utah, United States

- Interactive map of Dixie Center
- Address: 1835 South Convention Center Drive
- Location: St. George, Utah 84790; United States
- Coordinates: 37.076918°N 113.582284°W
- Capacity: 6,785
- Type: Convention Center

Construction
- Opened: 1998
- Renovated: 2006

Website
- dixiecenter.com

The Dixie Center is a convention center located in St. George, Utah, United States. It was built in 1998, with renovations taking place in 2006.

The convention center consists of a 46,500-square foot exhibit hall with 30 feet of ceiling height and maximum capacity of 6,785; a 13,205-square-foot ballroom with a 21-foot ceiling height and maximum capacity of 1,886; eleven meeting rooms ranging from 390 to 7,078 square feet and seating from 12 to 900 (there is a total of 16,878 square feet); and a 178-seat auditorium. At the main entrance there is a main and north lobby connected by a 4,300-square-foot concourse, bringing the total to 12,450 square foot, while the garden room is surrounded by 11,760 square feet of prefunction space.

In addition to hosting conventions, trade shows and other special events, Dixie Center is also a multipurpose sports arena. At the exhibit hall, portable seating risers can be brought in reducing maximum capacity to 6,000, while the five mezzanine meeting rooms are convertible into nine luxury suites seating 200, bringing the capacity to 6,200 and making the Dixie Center the largest indoor venue between Salt Lake City and Las Vegas, Nevada. Circuses, concerts, ice shows, sporting events, and graduations have been held here.

Controversy over the use of the name "Dixie" arose in 2020. However, the convention center was actually named for what was then named Dixie State University, and the center's name was the original name for Burns Arena which opened in 1986. When the current Dixie Center opened, the original venue was renamed to honor Ryder System executive Anthony Burns.
