= Chris Eubank Jr vs Conor Benn =

2025 boxing match

Fatal Fury
- Date: 26 April 2025
- Venue: Tottenham Hotspur Stadium, London, England
- Title(s) on the line: Non-title fight

Tale of the tape
Boxer	Chris Eubank Jr	Conor Benn
Nickname	Next Gen	The Destroyer
Hometown	Hove, England	London, England
Purse	£10,000,000	£8,000,000
Pre-fight record	34–3 (25 KOs)	23–0 (14 KOs)
Age	35 years, 7 months	28 years, 6 months
Height	5 ft 11 in (180 cm)	5 ft 8 in (173 cm)
Style	Orthodox	Orthodox
Recognition	IBO middleweight champion	

Result
- Chris Eubank Jr won via 12-round unanimous decision (116–112, 116–112, 116–112)

Chris Eubank Jr vs Conor Benn, billed as Fatal Fury, (Note: The event is being named after the upcoming video game from SNK titled Fatal Fury: City of the Wolves as part of a partnership.) was a middleweight professional boxing match contested between IBO middleweight champion Chris Eubank Jr and Conor Benn. The bout took place on 26 April 2025 at the Tottenham Hotspur Stadium in London, England. Eubank Jr won via unanimous decision.

Originally, the bout was scheduled to take place on 8 October 2022 at The O2 Arena in London, England, but was postponed after Benn tested positive for clomifene.

== Background ==
=== 2022–2024 ===
Rumours of a fight between English boxers Chris Eubank Jr and Conor Benn first surfaced in July 2022. On 10 August, the bout was officially announced to take place on 8 October at The O2 Arena in London at a catchweight of 157 Ibs. The bout was billed as "born rivals," a nod to the rivalry between the pair's fathers in the 1990s. However, on 5 October the event was cancelled after the British Boxing Board of Control prohibited Benn from participating after testing positive for clomifene.

Benn's promoters, Matchroom Sport, released a statement stating: "Benn has not been charged with any rule violation, he is not suspended, and he remains free to fight." Eubank's promoter also said the fight will go ahead as scheduled. The following day both promoters announced the fight was postponed.

The failed test was from September 2022. Voluntary Anti-Doping Association were informed of this on 23 September. The information was not shared to anyone else until Daily Mail reported it on fight week. UK Anti-Doping launched an investigation. In a statement, they wrote: “Following the British Boxing Board of Control Limited’s decision on 4th October 2022 to prohibit the contest between Chris Eubank Jnr. and Conor Benn that was scheduled to take place on 8th October 2022, the Board is aware that it has been widely reported in the press that an ‘A’ sample provided by Mr Benn to the Voluntary Anti-Doping Association tested positive for a prohibited substance. UK Anti-Doping (UKAD) has launched an investigation in relation to Mr Benn and the Board is in communication with UKAD in relation to that investigation. The Board will release further details in relation to this matter, as and when appropriate.” On 26 October, the BBBofC upheld misconduct allegations against Benn and at the same time revealed that Benn had voluntarily relinquished his boxing license. In an interview with The Sun, Benn revealed that he had failed two drugs tests. The one in September and another on 25 July. According to Benn, when he was informed of the first fail, he and his team concluded it to be a “faulty” test and asked for it to be investigated. Benn maintained his innocence, stating he signed up for VADA in February 2022, so it did not make sense for him to take drugs after this. Team Eubank were never informed of the failed test in July.

In February 2023, the WBC, who administer tests through VADA, cleared Benn on the grounds that there was no conclusive evidence. Benn was to be re-instated in WBC's rankings for the welterweight division. Although Benn did not agree with everything in the WBC's statement, he was content with his name being cleared. Upon hearing what the WBC said, the BBBofC released their own statement stating this would not affect their own investigation. On 28 July, UKAD officially cleared Benn. He put out a statement, which read, “Today marks the end of a gruelling 10 month process, during which the WBC had already decided that I was innocent of any wrongdoing. After a hearing with the National Anti-Doping Panel and UKAD, I have now been vindicated for the second time." Earlier in the year, the BBBofC said they wanted to wait for UKAD to complete their investigation, before allowing Benn to fight under their license again. On 6 November 2024, Benn had his provisional suspension lifted once again after an independent NADP panel ruled it was "not comfortably satisfied" that it had been proved he had committed an anti-doping rule violation. UKAD stated that they would carefully review the panel’s decision in accordance with its appeal rights under the UK Anti-Doping Rules. On 28 November 2024, UKAD and the BBBofC both announced they would not appeal.

==== Interim fights ====
===== Benn =====
After 525 days out of the ring, Benn fought his comeback fight in Orlando, Florida on 23 September 2023, against Mexican boxer Rodolfo Orozco. He won the fight by unanimous decision, with the judges scoring it 99–91, 99–91 and 96–94. He returned to the ring on 3 February 2024 in Las Vegas, where he defeated Peter Dobson by unanimous decision after 12 rounds.

===== Eubank =====
Eubank fought former world champion Liam Smith at the Manchester Arena in England on 21 January 2023. Eubank was beaten after the referee waved off the fight in the fourth round. A rematch between Eubank and Smith took place on 2 September 2023 after twice being rescheduled due to an injury to Smith. Eubank won the bout after the referee stepped in to wave off the fight in the 10th round. In July 2024 it was announced Eubank had signed a promotional deal with Boxxer having become a free agent following the end of his association with Wasserman Boxing. He then returned to the ring in Riyadh on 12 October 2024 on the undercard of Artur Beterbiev vs. Dmitry Bivol. Eubank stopped Polish boxer Kamil Szeremeta in the 7th round. After the bout, Eubank and Benn had a face off in the ring.

=== 2025 ===
On 24 January 2025, Turki Alalshikh announced on social media that the bout between Eubank Jr and Benn would be rescheduled for 26 April at the Tottenham Hotspur Stadium, in partnership with The Ring and being named after the upcoming video game Fatal Fury: City of the Wolves from SNK.

The launch press conference took place on 25 February in Manchester and did not go without drama and controversy. Benn took a swipe at Eubank only taking the fight for money, claiming Eubank owed Brazilian footballer Neymar $5 million. It was well knows, through social media that Eubank and Neymar previously played poker together. The insults continued with most of the talk being about Benn's positive drug test and the struggle for Eubank being 'forced' to make weight. and accepting a rehydration clause, which meant he could not weight 170 pounds on the morning of the fight. The press conference concluded with the two having a face-off. Words were exchanged as Eubank got an egg from inside his coat and slapped it on the side of Benn's face. The two teams then had to be separated. Nigel Benn was also near Benn at the face-off and was seen grabbing Eubank by the throat. Further face-offs between the two were cancelled.

Eubank explained his actions at the next press conference. He said: “I’m sitting on a stage with two of the scummiest characters in boxing. A drug cheat, and a man [Eddie Hearn] who did everything in his power to help him get away with it. Me throwing an egg at somebody who absurdly claims that that was the reason he failed two drug tests, because of contaminated eggs – I think that’s light. He deserved the embarrassment of what happened. If I had an opportunity to do it again I would." Eubank later focused his attention to Nigel Benn, who explained his actions. He said: “I didn’t know – I thought you actually glassed him, mate. That’s why I nearly got my hands around your throat.” Eubank responded with a threat stating, “I understand. But you did put your hand on my neck. I’m gonna give you a pass because of what happened, but I’m just letting you know, if your hand ever touches me again you won’t get it back.” Conor Benn immediately came in to defend his father being spoken to in that manner. There was a lot of talk in the build up whether Chris Eubank Sr would attend the fight in Juniors corner. The two were believed to be estranged over recent years.

In March, the BBBofC fined Eubank £100,000 for slapping the egg in Benn's face. According to them, the incident breached regulation 25 in relation to misconduct. Boxing media and boxers questioned the severity of the fine. Robert Smith of the BBBoC explained, “It was assault. Forget about the egg. He hit him with force, and it was premeditated.” He also noted that it was not the first time Eubank had been called in front of the board to explain his actions. When asked about the fine, Eubank replied, “money well spent”.

In April, ten days before the fight, Eubank posted on his social media showing transactions. As previously promised, he transferred £50,000 into 10 different boxers accounts, who were scheduled to appear on the undercard of the fight two years ago. He wrote: "Here's a little something to help out the undercard fighters that were left out of pocket. Few boxers didn't want to give me their bank details... maybe they will now." During the press conferences, he challenged both Hearn and Benn do to the same. During the press conference when this was first mentioned, Hearn explained the boxers who missed out on the undercard ended up being in rescheduled fights within the next few months. Benn was expected to move back down to the welterweight division regardless of the decision. Hearn expected both boxers to be booed as they make their respected ring walks. Experienced Victor Loughlin from Scotland was the referee appointed for the fight.

== Weigh in ==
After arriving an hour late, Eubank weighed in over the middleweight limit on his first attempt at 160.2 lbs, and on his second and final attempt, he recorded 160.05 pounds, exceeding the limit by just 0.05 lbs. Benn weighed in at a comfortable 156.4 pounds. Eubank expressed frustration over the weigh-in procedure, claiming the scales were closed early and that he was denied the opportunity to urinate to shed the small excess weight. He described tactics designed to unsettle him ahead of the fight. For missing weight, Eubank was fined £375,000 (~$500,000), which was paid to Benn. The morning of the fight, Benn came in at 165 pounds and Eubank, who again, attended the weigh in late, weighed 169.4 pounds. Eubank criticized Benn’s team for using psychological tactics to disrupt him, while Hearn attributed Eubank's miss to poor weight management by his team.

== Fight night ==
=== Pre-fight ===
Drama unfolded on the night before the fight took place. During the build up, Eubank's rival Billy Joe Saunders told Benn he will enter Eubank's dressing too when his hands are being wrapped. He nearly came through with the promise as there was a small scuffle between him and Eubank's manager outside the dressing room as he was denied entry into the room. Eubank was watching this unfold whilst having him hands wrapped via a TV in his dressing room. Before this, there was a backstage clip of Eubank arriving in to the arena, accompanied by his estranged father Chris Eubank. The clip was shown to the live audience, which received loud cheers.

=== The fight ===
There was an announced crowd of 67,484 in attendance. The fight was dramatic, competitive, and physical as it went the 12-round distance. It was Eubank who had his hand raised at the end winning via unanimous decision. Benn started aggressively, pressing early and landing significant shots, including a powerful eighth round where he hurt Eubank Jr badly. However, Eubank Jr gradually regained control with sharp jabs and precise punches, demonstrating superior stamina and experience. Both fighters engaged in an cutthroat final round, trading punches in non-stop action. Despite Benn’s relentless pressure and power, Eubank Jr showed resilience and tactical skill, outlanding Benn in every round. All three judges agreed on a 116–112 scorecard for Eubank. After hearing the decision, Eubank fell to his knees and Benn looked distraught and sought comfort from his father. Speaking after the fight Eubank said, “I didn’t think he’d be the guy to bring it out of me like that, but the fact that our fathers did what they did all those years ago, it brings out a different soul and a different spirit to you. And that’s what we both showed here. I pushed through. There’s a lot of things that have been going on in my life that I’m not going to go into. But I’m happy to have this man [his father] back in my life. We’ve upheld the family name like we said we were going to do, and onwards and upwards.”

==== CompuBox stats ====
According to CompuBox punch stats, Eubank landed 367 of 912 punches (40%) which was more than Benn who landed 215 of 593 (36%).

Fighter	Total punches	Total jabs	Power punches
Eubank	367/912	140/356	227/259
Eubank	40.2%	40%	40.4%
Benn	215/593	35/170	180/371
Benn	36.3%	25.5%	39.5%

=== Post-fight ===
Eubank was taken to hospital as a precaution and Benn attended the post-fight presser with Hearn, who heavily praised him. Hearn said, “I thought the fight could have gone either way. I know a lot of people thought he [Benn] won, a lot of people thought Eubank won, whatever. But I want to talk about the performance, the heart, the mentality and the never say die spirit from Conor Benn, because I can’t believe what I witnessed.” Despite the rematch clause, Hearn said Benn could land a world title fight later in the year instead. Benn claimed Eubank had a broken jaw. This was quickly confirmed to not be true by Eubank's promoter Ben Shalom. Eubank spent two nights in hospital and was discharged on 28 April.

== Official scorecards ==
Judge	Fighter	1	2	3	4	5	6	7	8	9	10	11	12	Total
Lee Every	Eubank	10	10	9	10	10	10	10	9	9	9	10	10	116
Lee Every	Benn	9	9	10	9	9	9	9	10	10	10	9	9	112
Kieran McCann	Eubank	10	9	9	10	10	10	9	10	10	9	10	10	116
Kieran McCann	Benn	9	10	10	9	9	9	10	9	9	10	9	9	112
Mark Bates	Eubank	10	9	9	10	10	10	10	9	9	10	10	10	116
Mark Bates	Benn	9	10	10	9	9	9	9	10	10	9	9	9	112

== Aftermath ==
A day after the first meeting, Turki Alalshikh told reporters a rematch was likely to take place in September 2025, again in Tottenham Hotspur Stadium in London. It was dependant on whether both boxers escaped the first fight uninjured and awaiting the 2025–26 Premier League fixtures, to confirm the stadium was available. On 29 June, Alalshikh announced the rematch was set and all terms were agreed for the rematch to take place on 20 September in London. It was contracted that the fight would take place again at the Tottenham Hotspur Stadium.

It was reported that Eubank's purse was £10 million, while Benn earned £8 million. A career-high for both boxers. Each team entered separate negotiations with Turki Alalshikh to agree a deal.

In September 2025, during the rematch press conference, Eubank detailed the severe dehydration he experienced after the first fight, which led to a medical emergency and required an ambulance. He noted that one of the toenails on his big toe had come off and recounted the distressing experience of being stuck in the ambulance for 20 minutes due to obstruction by stadium personnel, indicating that this delay could have had life-threatening implications had he sustained a serious injury. Additionally, he criticized Matchroom Boxing for this delay. Eubank also addressed Conor Benn and Eddie Hearn, alleging that they misrepresented his medical condition to the media by incorrectly stating that his hospital visit was due to a broken jaw. He voiced his frustration with their perceived dishonesty, referring to them as "bullshit artists." In response, Hearn invited Eubank to clarify his accusations against his organization, suggesting the potential for a defamation lawsuit. This exchange underscored the contentious nature of the fight and the ongoing tensions among the parties involved.

Eubank documented a series of purported attempts to undermine his performance, emphasizing the various strategies employed by his opponents. He outlined instances of contract violations, financial penalties, and specific rehydration requirements as challenges he encountered. Furthermore, he reported a compromised weigh-in process, alongside biased commentary and refereeing, suggesting a coordinated effort to impede his performance. On the night of the fight, Eubank described an incident in which his team's entry into the stadium was delayed by 30 minutes. He pointed out that security personnel appeared to intentionally slow his arrival, which further complicated his pre-fight preparations. Despite these challenges, Eubank highlighted his ability to overcome the disruptions and ultimately secure the win. His remarks indicated a broader concern regarding the extent to which competitors may go to achieve an advantage in the realm of competitive sports.

Eubank expressed considerable dissatisfaction with the British Boxing Board of Control, specifically targeting Robert Smith, whom he identified as an influential member of the organization. He criticized Smith for permitting media access to his private weigh-in, asserting that this contributed to his inability to meet the weight requirements and resulted in a significant fine of $500,000. Eubank also accused Smith of permitting Benn to compete using gloves with horsehair, which constituted a breach of their contractual agreement and indicated a significant violation of regulations. In addition, Eubank recounted an occurrence on fight night in which Smith allegedly enabled the presence of rival Billy Joe Saunders in his changing room, believing this to be an attempt to undermine his concentration prior to the match. Following the fight, Eubank remarked on Smith's effort to extend his hand for a handshake, which he considered hypocritical under the circumstances. He characterized Smith as a manipulative individual, suggesting that he is influenced by Matchroom and Eddie Hearn, labelling him as part of a corrupt system within the boxing industry.

== Fight card ==
Weight Class		vs		Method	Round	Time	Notes
Middleweight	Chris Eubank Jr	def.	Conor Benn	UD	12
Light heavyweight	Anthony Yarde	def.	Lyndon Arthur	UD	12
Middleweight	Aaron McKenna	def.	Liam Smith	UD	12
Cruiserweight	Viddal Riley	def.	Cheavon Clarke (c)	UD	12		^{Note 1}
Cruiserweight	Chris Billam-Smith	def.	Brandon Glanton	UD	12

^Note 1 For British cruiserweight title

== Broadcasting ==
Country/Region	Broadcasters			
Country/Region	Free	Cable TV	PPV	Stream
United Kingdom (Host)	BBC Radio 5 Live; BBC Radio 5 Sports Extra; Talksport	—N/a	Sky Sports Box Office; DAZN PPV	
Ireland	—N/a	—N/a	Sky Sports Box Office; DAZN PPV	
United States	—N/a	—N/a	DAZN PPV	
Worldwide	—N/a	—N/a	DAZN PPV	

== Viewership ==
At a cost of £19.95, The Ring announced the fight generated around 620,000 pay-per-view buys, while Eddie Hearn claimed the figure was "Well over a million worldwide".

=== Attendance ===
The fight was a sell-out capacity for boxing with 67,484 in attendance at the Tottenham Hotspur Stadium.

== Rematch ==
The rematch took place on 15 November, again at the Tottenham Hotspur Stadium. Benn gained revenge, dominating the fight throughout, dropping Eubank twice in the twelfth round, and winning via unanimous decision. The judges scorecards read 119–107, 116–110 and 118–108. After the fight, Benn said the rivalry was over. He stated, "This is the end of the Benn-Eubank saga, over. Chris has twins coming and I have my boy, but this ends here."
