= Aaron McKenna =

Irish boxer (born 1999)

Personal information
- Nickname: Silencer
- Born: Aaron Noel McKenna; 6 July 1999 (age 27) Monaghan, Ireland
- Height: 6 ft 3 in (191 cm)
- Weight: Middleweight

Boxing career
- Reach: 75 in (191 cm)
- Stance: Orthodox

Boxing record
- Total fights: 21
- Wins: 21
- Win by KO: 10

Aaron McKenna (born 6 July 1999) is an Irish professional boxer. He has held the International Boxing Federation (IBF) middleweight title since August 2026.

== Early life ==
McKenna is from Smithborough, Monaghan. His brother, Stephen, is also a professional boxer.

== Amateur career ==
An eight time national champion, he captained Ireland 5 times in international boxing and racked up 161 fights with only 9 losses. He won gold at the European schoolboy championships.

== Professional career ==
A potential Tokyo 2020 Olympian, McKenna opted to turn pro on his 18th birthday.

He became the WBC Youth middleweight champion with a unanimous decision win over Carlos Gallego Montijo at the Crystal Palace National Sports Centre in London on 21 December 2021.

On 23 June 2023, he beat Uisma Lima by unanimous decision at York Hall in London to win the vacant WBC International middleweight title.

He defeated former world champion Liam Smith by unanimous decision at Tottenham Hotspur Stadium in London on 26 April 2025.

=== IBF middleweight champion ===
McKenna signed with Zuffa Boxing and headlined the company's 10th show at the 3Arena in Dublin on 8 August 2026, where he fought Etinosa Oliha for the vacant IBF middleweight title, winning the contest by unanimous decision.

== Professional boxing record ==
21 fights	21 wins	0 losses
By knockout	10	0
By decision	11	0

No.	Result	Record	Opponent	Type	Round, time	Date	Location	Notes
21	Win	21–0	Etinosa Oliha	UD	12	8 Aug 2026	3Arena, Dublin, Ireland	Won vacant IBF middleweight title
20	Win	20–0	Liam Smith	UD	12	26 Apr 2025	Tottenham Hotspur Stadium, London, England	Won vacant WBA International middleweight title
19	Win	19–0	Jeovanny Estela	TKO	10 (10), 2:06	15 Jul 2024	Yamato Arena, Suita, Japan	
18	Win	18–0	Mickey Ellison	TKO	6 (8), 2:21	20 Jan 2024	Liverpool Arena, Liverpool, England	
17	Win	17–0	Uisma Lima	UD	10	16 Jun 2023	York Hall, London, England	Won vacant WBC International middleweight title
16	Win	16–0	Jordan Grant	PTS	6	25 Mar 2023	Manchester Arena, Manchester, England	
15	Win	15–0	David Benitez	TKO	7 (8), 1:40	25 Jun 2022	Coventry Skydome, Coventry, England	
14	Win	14–0	Carlos Gallego Montijo	UD	8	10 Dec 2021	Crystal Palace National Sports Centre, London, England	Won vacant WBC Youth middleweight title
13	Win	13–0	Gabor Gorbics	PTS	8	13 Nov 2021	Coventry Skydome, Coventry, England	
12	Win	12–0	Ivica Gogsevic	PTS	6	10 Sep 2021	Coventry Skydome, Coventry, England	
11	Win	11–0	Jordan Grannum	RTD	2 (6), 3:00	11 Dec 2020	Fly by Nite Rehearsal Studios, Redditch, England	
10	Win	10–0	Victor Eddy Gaytan	KO	2 (6), 1:58	5 Dec 2019	The Hangar, Costa Mesa, California, US	
9	Win	9–0	Sergio Lucio Gonzalez	UD	6	24 Oct 2019	Fantasy Springs Resort Casino, Indio, California, US	
8	Win	8–0	Daniel Perales Osorio	KO	2 (4), 0:42	21 Jun 2019	Fantasy Springs Resort Casino, Indio, California, US	
7	Win	7–0	Loretto Olivas	UD	6	30 Mar 2019	Fantasy Springs Resort Casino, Indio, California, US	
6	Win	6–0	Abel Reyes	KO	2 (6), 2:27	8 Nov 2018	Fantasy Springs Resort Casino, Indio, California, US	
5	Win	5–0	Rolando Mendivil	UD	4	11 Aug 2018	The Avalon, Hollywood, California, US	
4	Win	4–0	Darel Harris	RTD	3 (4), 3:00	23 May 2018	Loews Santa Monica Beach Hotel, Santa Monica, California, US	
3	Win	3–0	Keasen Freeman	KO	1 (4), 2:06	12 Apr 2018	Fantasy Springs Resort Casino, Indio, California, US	
2	Win	2–0	Jose Saul Palacios	KO	1 (4), 2:46	22 Mar 2018	Fantasy Springs Resort Casino, Indio, California, US	
1	Win	1–0	Travis Conley	UD	4	9 Dec 2017	Mandalay Bay Events Center, Paradise, Nevada, US	

== See also ==
- List of male boxers
- Notable boxing families
- List of world middleweight boxing champions

Sporting positions
Regional boxing titles
Vacant Title last held by Ramadan Hiseni	WBC Youth middleweight champion 10 December 2021 – 2022; Vacated	Vacant Title next held by Souleimane Mohammedi
Vacant Title last held by Felix Cash	WBC International middleweight champion 16 June 2023 – 2024; Vacated	Vacant Title next held by Fiodor Czerkaszyn
Vacant Title last held by Vadim Tukov	WBA International middleweight champion 26 April 2025 – 2025; Vacated	Vacant Title next held by Sam Gilley
World boxing titles
Vacant Title last held by Janibek Alimkhanuly	IBF middleweight champion 8 August 2026 – present	Incumbent
