= Eddie Hearn =

English sports promoter (born 1979)

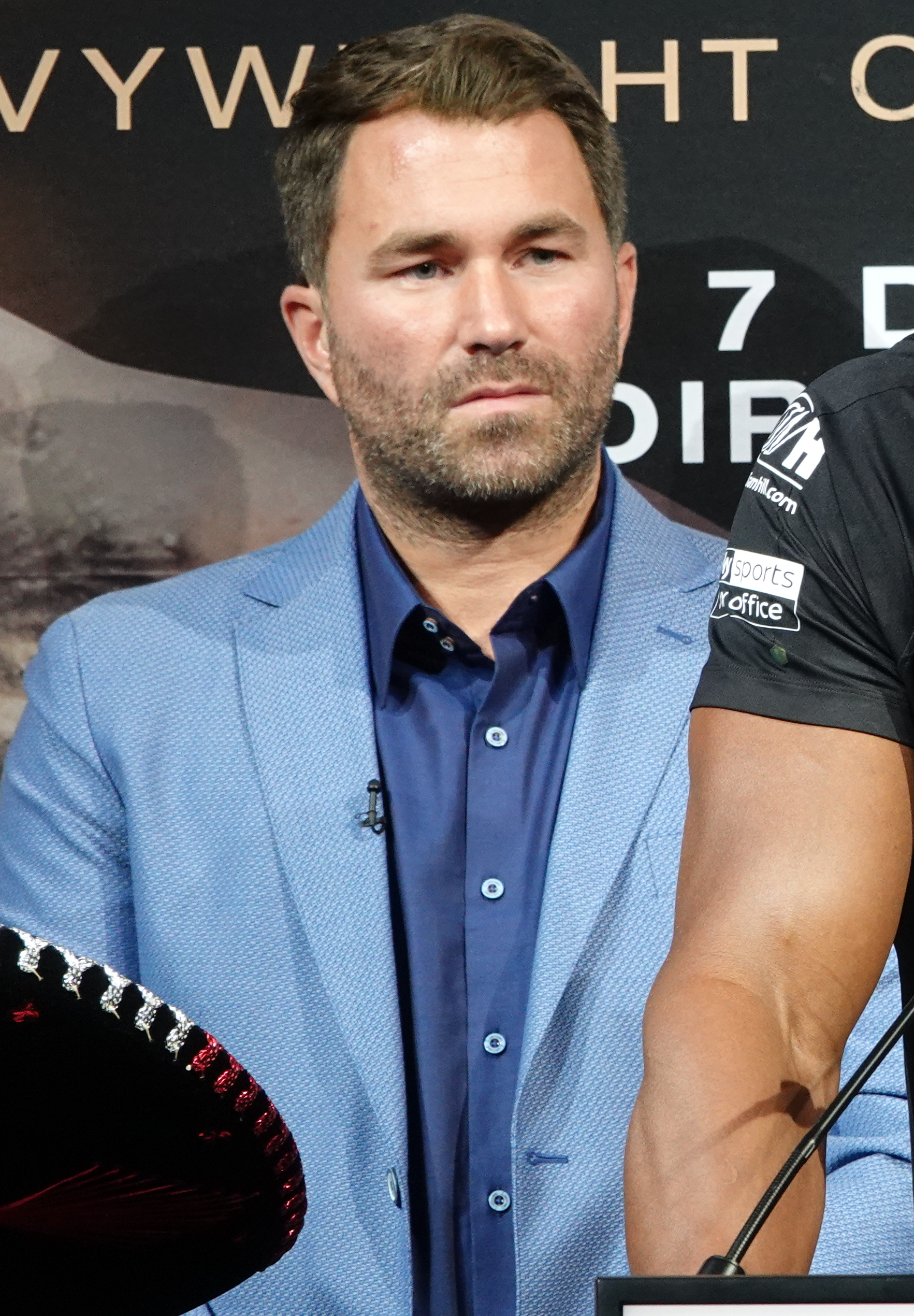
- Hearn in 2019
- Born: Edward John Hearn; 8 June 1979 (age 47); Essex, England
- Education: Brentwood School; Havering Sixth Form College
- Occupations: Businessman, sports promoter
- Title: Chairman of Matchroom Sport
- Spouse: Chloe Hearn
- Children: 2
- Father: Barry Hearn
- Website: matchroomboxing.com

Edward John Hearn (born 8 June 1979) is an English sports promoter and the chairman of Matchroom Sport and the Professional Darts Corporation. Hearn is best known for his work with Matchroom Boxing, with which he has promoted multiple world champions including Anthony Joshua, Canelo Álvarez, Gennady Golovkin, Katie Taylor and Vasyl Lomachenko. He is the son of promoter Barry Hearn, the founder of Matchroom Sport.

== Early life and education ==
Hearn was born in 1979 to Susan and Barry Hearn. Barry had grown up in a council estate in Dagenham but later became a successful businessman involved in sports promotion. During the 1980s snooker boom, the family moved into an 18-acre, 11-bedroom house in Brentwood, Essex. Eddie had one sibling, a sister named Katie. When Barry expanded into boxing promotion in the late 1980s, Eddie began to associate with figures such as Francis Ampofo, Frank Bruno, Chris Eubank and Lennox Lewis. Barry was afraid Eddie would "end up as one of those rich kids who have no motivation". To develop a work ethic, he gave Eddie chores such as shoe-shining and car-washing. By age 15, Eddie had begun cold calling to offer double-glazing, which he later described as "unbelievable schooling" for a salesman.

Hearn was a student at Brentwood School, a selective private school. He failed to get into sixth form at Brentwood School as he performed poorly on his GCSEs. Hearn played cricket and football to a high standard, and his father Barry petitioned the school to let him stay on for his sporting record, but the school refused. Hearn said, "I grew up thinking I was a hard nut and in Brentwood School I was. Anywhere else I was a pansy." He then went to Havering College of Further and Higher Education in Hornchurch, which was not selective. Barry encouraged Hearn to study by promising him £1,000 for a C or better grade in his A-level subjects, which were communications studies, physical education and business studies. Hearn achieved two Cs and one A.

== Career ==
Matchroom Sport was founded by Eddie's father, Barry Hearn. After leaving education, Hearn started a career at a sports management company representing golfers, eventually moving on to promote online poker with Matchroom with the events being broadcast worldwide. In the UK, they were broadcast by Channel 4, Channel 5 and Sky Sports.

In 2010, Hearn met boxer Audley Harrison at a poker game and agreed to help him rebuild his career, subsequently getting Harrison a fight with heavyweight champion David Haye for his WBA title, which began his career and establishment of Matchroom Boxing.

In 2013, Hearn signed a promotional agreement with Anthony Joshua, one year after his gold medal win at the London 2012 Olympics. Hearn has promoted Joshua's entire boxing career to date, including multiple world champion fights.

In 2014, Hearn promoted Carl Froch vs. George Groves II in 2014 at Wembley Stadium with 80,000 fans in attendance.

In 2015, Hearn signed an exclusive televised boxing deal with UK broadcaster Sky Sports to broadcast up to 20 shows a year. The deal was in place for six years and lasted until 2021.

In 2017, Hearn promoted Anthony Joshua vs. Wladimir Klitschko which took place at Wembley Stadium with 90,000 fans in attendance.

In May 2018, Hearn revealed boxing's first-ever $1 billion boxing deal (£750 million) as Matchroom and streaming service DAZN signed an agreement to stream shows across the United States. At the heart of the deal, Hearn and Matchroom Boxing would stage 16 shows in America, which would be streamed exclusively on DAZN in the U.S., while 16 of his UK shows will also be shown on the platform.

In 2019, Hearn agreed a deal to promote a professional boxing match between YouTube personalities KSI and Logan Paul, which took place on 9 November 2019 at the Staples Center in Los Angeles. This match was heavily criticised by boxing fans across the globe; they claimed KSI and Paul were not suitable to be promoted by Hearn, due to their lack of experience. Referring to their first amateur fight which Hearn had previously declined to promote, he described it as "a really good fight and I told myself I'm doing the rematch."

In the same year, Hearn came under criticism for staging Andy Ruiz Jr. vs. Anthony Joshua II in Saudi Arabia, due to the country's poor human rights record. He defended the decision by stating that Saudi Arabia wanted to improve its image and that his job "is to provide the best opportunities for our fighters."

In 2019, Hearn launched a BBC Radio 5 Live podcast called 'No Passion, No Point' interviewing a number of sports professionals including Andrew Flintoff, Wayne Rooney and Tyson Fury.

In April 2021, Hearn was appointed Chairman of the Matchroom Group after Hearn's father, Barry Hearn, stepped aside from the role of chairman to become president of the group in an advisory role.

On 8 May 2021, Hearn promoted Canelo Álvarez vs. Billy Joe Saunders in front of 73,126 fans at the AT&T Stadium in Arlington, Texas, which broke the all-time attendance record for an indoor boxing event in the United States. Matchroom subsequently agreed a further two-fight promotional deal with Canelo Álvarez in a deal worth $85 million. Later that same month, Hearn became involved in a war of words with rival promoters Bob Arum of Top Rank, and Frank Warren of Queensberry Promotions, over the failure of a deal coming to fruition for a proposed Tyson Fury vs. Anthony Joshua fight, accusing them of making "absolutely zero attempt to try and save the Anthony Joshua fight".

On 3 June 2021, Hearn announced that he had signed a five-year deal that meant he would be taking his entire stable of Matchroom fighters to streaming service DAZN, which ended Matchroom's previous partnership with Sky Sports in the UK and Ireland. As part of the deal, all Matchroom events will be shown exclusively on DAZN worldwide, and "at least 16 Matchroom UK fights [will be] annually available exclusively to DAZN subscribers in the UK and Ireland for the first time, from July 2021 onwards".

In September 2021, Hearn and Anthony Joshua announced a new promotional deal to last until the end of the boxer's career.

In April 2022, Hearn co-promoted the Katie Taylor vs. Amanda Serrano fight at Madison Square Garden in New York City, the first women's fight to headline the venue.

In 2024, Hearn participated in the Queensberry vs. Matchroom 5v5 event in Riyadh, Saudi Arabia, a distinctive boxing competition against fellow promoter Frank Warren. Each promoter selected five fighters, with the scoring system awarding two points for a knockout, one point for a decision win, and double points for victories by team captains. Despite Hearn's strategic efforts, his team was decisively defeated, losing all matches and ending with a 10–0 loss against Warren's team. In 2025 he promoted Conor Benn in his two fights against Chris Eubank Jr.

In March 2026, Hearn expanded his Matchroom talent agency to include rugby union players. Northampton Saints and England back row Henry Pollock closely followed by Bath fly half and Scotland international Finn Russell in April 2026. In August 2026, Hearn made headlines by suggesting that Pollock should be paid £1million per year during contract re-negotiations with his club team, a substantial increase on his existing deal reportedly worth around £150,000. An agreement was eventually reached in September 2026 with Pollock ultimately tripling his salary to £400,000 per year on a multi-year deal.

== Personal life ==
As of 2019, Hearn lived near Billericay in Essex with his wife Chloe and their two daughters. In 2024, Hearn spoke out against knife crime in Britain and stated the government's response to it was too lenient. He said that he questioned why he still lived in the country and felt it was not a safe place to raise children. As of 2025, Hearn no longer lived in the United Kingdom and had taken up residence in Monaco.

Hearn generally has a good relationship with the fighters he promotes, and is good friends with former WBC cruiserweight champion Tony Bellew whose career he helped turn around. In 2020, then unified heavyweight champion Anthony Joshua, whom Hearn has promoted since Joshua's professional debut in 2013, said that he and Eddie "will always have a great friendship."

After Hearn promoted a boxing event in Fresno, California in 2021, the Mayor of Fresno, Jerry Dyer, declared 16 October to be celebrated as "Matchroom Boxing and Eddie Hearn Day".

== Bibliography ==
- Relentless: 12 Rounds to Success (2020) ISBN 978-1529312195
